= Lola Montez (disambiguation) =

Lola Montez (Marie Dolores Eliza Rosanna Gilbert, Countess of Landsfeld, 1821–1861), was an Irish dancer and actress.

Lola Montez or Lola Montes may also refer to:

== Film ==
- Lola Montez (1918 film), a German silent film
  - Lola Montez (1919 film), a loose sequel
- Lola Montes (1944 film), a Spanish historical drama film
- Lola Montez (1962 film), an Australian musical film
- Lola Montez, the King's Dancer, a 1922 German silent historical drama film
- Lola Montès, a 1955 historical romance film based on the life of Lola Montez

== People ==
- Lola Montes (dancer) (1918–2008), stage name of Chita Equizabal, American-born Spanish dancer
- Lola Montes (singer), (1898–1983), stage name of Mercedes Fernández, Spanish singer

== Other uses ==
- Lola Montez (musical), a 1958 Australian musical
- "Lola Montez" (song), by Volbeat, 2013
- Lola Montez (One Life to Live), a fictional character in the soap opera

== See also ==
- Montez, a surname
