= Montez =

Montez is a surname and an alternative version of Montes. Notable people bearing the name include:

- António Montez (1885–1968), Portuguese sports shooter
- Carlos Montez Melancia (1927–2022), former governor of Macau
- Chris Montez (born 1943), American singer
- Lola Montez (Countess of Landsfeld, 1821–1861), Irish dancer and actress
  - Lola Montez (musical), 1958
  - "Lola Montez" (song), by Volbeat, 2013
  - Lola Montez (1918 film), a German silent film
    - Lola Montez (1919 film), a loose sequel
  - Lola Montez, the King's Dancer, a 1922 German silent historical drama film
- Maria Montez (1912–1951), Dominican-born actress known as "The Queen of Technicolor"
  - María Montez International Airport, Barahona, Dominican Republic
  - María Montez metro station, Dominican Republic
- Mario Montez (1935–2013), Puerto Rican cross dresser and drag queen
- Ricardo Montez (1923–2010), British actor
- Ron Montez (fl. 1970s/80s), ballroom dancer and choreographer
- Steven Montez (born 1997), American football player
- Tim Montez (born 1961), American baseball coach

== Given name ==
- Montez Aiken
- Montez Ford
- Montez Sweat

== Fictional characters ==
- Gabriella Montez, a character in the High School Musical film series
- Wildcat (Yolanda Montez), a superheroine in the DC Comics universe

== See also ==
- Lola Montez (disambiguation)
