= Lola and the Highwayman =

- Also known as: Lola and the Highwayman
- Genre: musical
- Directed by: Fred Maxian
- Starring: Suzanne Steele
- Country of origin: Australia
- Original language: English

Production
- Running time: 30 minutes
- Production company: ABC

Original release
- Network: ABC
- Release: 27 September 1965 (Sydney)
- Release: 4 October 1965 (Melbourne)
- Release: 25 October 1965 (Brisbane)

Lola and the Highwayman is a 1965 Australian TV special. It consisted of selected songs from the Australian stage musicals Lola Montez and The Highwayman and combined them to tell a short thirty minute story. The special is the only known visual record of either musical to survive. (A 1962 version of Lola Montez was filmed but does not survive.)

Fred Maxian, who directed the special, said "some of the melodies from these musicals are among the best in the world." Songs selected from the musical were interwoven in a story to give it continuity.

Eleven songs were used in all.

An extract from the production is at the State Library of New South Wales.

== Cast ==
- Suzanne Steele as Lola Montez
- Jon Weaving
- Maureen Boyce
- Audrey Duggan

== Select songs ==
- "Gold, God of the World"
- "Saturday Girl"
