= Charles Burr =

Charles Burr may refer to:

- Charles Chauncey Burr (1817–1883), American journalist, author, and publisher
- Charles E. Burr (1934–2008), American Champion Thoroughbred horse racing jockey
