= In the Ecstasy of Billions =

In the Ecstasy of Billions can refer to:

- In the Ecstasy of Billions (1920 film), a 1920 German film
- In the Ecstasy of Billions (1922 film), a 1922 German film
