= The Tragedy of the Dishonoured =

1924 film

- Directed by: Josef Berger
- Written by: Robert Heymann
- Cinematography: Artur von Schwertführer
- Production company: Union-Film
- Release date: 1924
- Country: Germany
- Languages: Silent; German intertitles

The Tragedy of the Dishonoured (German: Die Tragödie der Entehrten) is a 1924 German silent film directed by Josef Berger and starring Cläre Lotto, Albert Steinrück, and Clementine Plessner.

The film's art direction was by Karl Machus.

== Cast ==
- Cläre Lotto
- Albert Steinrück
- Clementine Plessner
- John Mylong
- Walter Lantzsch
- Julius Stettner
- Lotte Treumann
- Karl Ludwig Diehl
