= The Blame (film) =

1924 film

- Directed by: Josef Berger
- Written by: Robert Heymann
- Cinematography: Franz Weihmayr
- Production company: Union-Film
- Release date: 1924
- Country: Germany
- Languages: Silent; German intertitles

The Blame (German: Die Schuld) is a 1924 German silent film directed by Josef Berger.

The film's art direction was by Karl Machus.

== Cast ==
In alphabetical order

- Anita Banet
- Emil Courten
- Karl Ludwig Diehl
- Cläre Lotto
- Rolf Pinegger
- Ernst Schrumpf
- Albert Steinrück
- Claire Stöckel
- Anni Zesch-Ballot
