= The Highwayman (musical) =

Australian musical comedy

The Highway Man
- Music: Edmond Samuels
- Lyrics: Edmond Samuels
- Book: Edmond Samuels
- Productions: 1936 London; 1950 Melbourne

The Highwayman is an Australian musical comedy with book, music and lyrics by Edmond Samuels. Set in Bendigo during the Gold Rush in the 1860s, the story concerns the love of an innkeeper's daughter for a highwayman.

== At the Silver Swan ==
Samuels wrote the play back in 1933.

He travelled to England in 1935 to oversee a production of it in London. The work was retitled At the Silver Swan and debuted in Glasgow in 1936.

The book and lyrics were rewritten in England by Guy Bolton and Clifford Gret.

The musical was the first musical comedy with an Australian setting to debut in London.

Smith's Weekly thought the music dated the show. Other reviews were mixed.

The musical was not considered a notable success. However it did run for three months.

"Its Australian theme was unrecognisable by the time producers had finished with it," said Samuels. "They said Aus-tralia wouldn't interest London theatregoers."

== Australian production ==
Samuels tried to get the play produced in Australia and ended up financing it himself.

The Highwayman premiered at the King's Theatre in Melbourne in November 1950. The Age praised its "originality, snap and gusto." The Bulletin said it was "all very bight and catchy." ABC Weekly said "Samuels until a year or so ago was a very successful Sydney chemist but if he had mixed his drugs as recklessly as he mixes his periods in The Highwayman his customers would have been in a serious plight." The show ran for over a hundred performances.

It played a Sydney season at the Palace Theatre from March 1951. The Sydney Morning Herald said "in many ways the show is imitative and (a lesser fault) old-fashioned in style. It lacks the bold strokes of original invention and new discovery that distinguish great showmanship from ephemeral competence in show making."

An album of songs from the musical was released in 1964.

== Premise ==
Mary Brown is an innkeeper's daughter at Eaglehaw. Mervyn Smith is a bushranger.

Jim Steel is a guards officer.

== TV adaptation ==
Songs featured in the 1965 TV special Lola and the Highwayman.

== Radio adaptation ==
The musical was also adapted for radio in 1951 and 1954. Reviewing the latter, the Daily Telegraph said "when Mr. S. uses words, either in dialogue or lyrics, I find the result extremely depressing."

In 1956, the ABC would broadcast Samuels' musical Song of the Snowy.
