= The Old Guard (magazine) =

19th century American magazine

The Old Guard was an American magazine published from 1863 to 1867 by Charles Chauncey Burr in New York City. Burr was a staunch enemy of the American Civil War as well as a defender of slavery. The first edition of the magazine opened with an unsigned article on the cost of war to the Northern states, and its second article, written and signed by Burr, attacks and scorns noted abolitionists such as Henry Ward Beecher, warning that they might "turn our country into an African jungle."

Burr, who was an intimate friend of Edgar Allan Poe, used the magazine to publish a number of articles advocating Poe and later defending his reputation (all the while attacking Poe's critical biographer, Rufus Wilmot Griswold). In 1869, he stopped editing the magazine and his position was taken over by Thomas Dunn English, who had an ongoing feud with Poe and published two anti-Poe and pro-Griswold articles in the magazine, the second one of which was published in the magazine's last issue, October 1870.
