= Robert Heymann =

German screenwriter and film director

- Born: 28 February 1879; Munich, Bavaria, German Empire
- Died: 23 January 1946 (aged 66); Italy
- Occupations: Director, Screenwriter
- Years active: 1916-1924 (film)

Robert Heymann (1879–1946) was a German screenwriter and film director active during the silent era. He began as a playwright in 1901 and also wrote novels. He worked with the Berlin-based production company Luna Film. For them he directed the four-part Satan's Memoirs, the second most expensive German film made during the First World War. The 1931 film Panic in Chicago was adapted from his novel of the same title. Of Jewish heritage he had to leave Germany following the Nazi takeover.

== Selected filmography ==
- Lola Montez (1918)
- Cain (1918)
- Victim of Society (1919)
- The Secret of the Scaffold (1919)
- Schwarzwaldmädel (1920)
- The Haunting of Castle Kitay (1920)
- Colonel Chabert (1920)
- The Deerslayer and Chingachgook (1920)
- The Last of the Mohicans (1920)
- Circus People (1922)
- In the Ecstasy of Billions (1922)
- Time Is Money (1923)
- The Emperor's Old Clothes (1923)
- The Blame (1924)
- The Tragedy of the Dishonoured (1924)

== Bibliography ==
- Giesen, Rolf. The Nosferatu Story: The Seminal Horror Film, Its Predecessors and Its Enduring Legacy. McFarland, 2019.
- Jung, Uli & Schatzberg, Walter. Beyond Caligari: The Films of Robert Wiene. Berghahn Books, 1999.
