= The Old and the Young King =

- Film poster
- German: Der alte und der junge König
- Directed by: Hans Steinhoff
- Written by: Thea von Harbou; Rolf Lauckner
- Produced by: Alfred Greven
- Starring: Emil Jannings; Werner Hinz; Leopoldine Konstantin
- Cinematography: Karl Puth
- Edited by: Willy Zeyn
- Music by: Wolfgang Zeller
- Production company: Deka Film
- Distributed by: Neue Deutsch Lichtspiel-Syndikat Verleih; Sascha Film (Austria)
- Release date: 29 January 1935
- Running time: 100 minutes
- Country: Nazi Germany
- Language: German

The Old and the Young King (German: Der alte und der junge König) is a 1935 German historical drama film directed by Hans Steinhoff and starring Emil Jannings, Werner Hinz and Leopoldine Konstantin.

The film's sets were designed by the art directors Fritz Maurischat and Karl Weber. It was produced by a subsidiary of Tobis Film. Location shooting took place around Potsdam, including at the Garrison Church. Interiors were shot at the Grunewald and Johannisthal Studios. It premiered at the Ufa-Palast am Zoo.

Part of the tradition of Prussian films of the Weimar and Nazi eras, the film ostensibly deals with the intense conflict between Prussian King Friedrich Wilhelm I and his son and heir, Crown Prince Friedrich – the future King Friedrich II "The Great". This well-known incident of 18th century German history drew much contemporary attention and subsequently inspired a number of works of art and entertainment, including various stage and screen productions.

However, in its specific presentation of this historical theme, the film was a work of Nazi propaganda aimed at extolling the Führerprinzip, i.e. blind obedience to the Leader (the King in the film's plot, Hitler in the reality for which the film was a parable); complaints of "encirclement" and the need for Lebensraum also feature.

For that reason, the film was banned by the Allied military government following the Nazi defeat in 1945. However, after the foundation of the Federal Republic of Germany the FSK ("Voluntary Self Regulation of the Movie Industry") reviewed it on 4 August 1958 and ruled that, unlike other films made under the Nazis, the propaganda element in it was not so blatant as to justify its inclusion in the list of "Forbidden Films" (de:Vorbehaltsfilm).

== Plot ==
The film opens at Potsdam in the time of "The Soldier King" Friedrich Wilhelm I of Prussia, with the royal family sitting at the breakfast table. It turns out that Crown Prince Friedrich, informally called "Fritz", lost so much money at the gaming tables that he had to sign IOUs. Moreover, members of the grenadier regiment saw the Crown Prince appearing late for roll call in a dishevelled state, which greatly angers his father.

The King wants to prepare his son for his future role as a ruler, and regards his preoccupation with music and literature with much displeasure. Exasperated with his father's strictness, Fritz hatches a plan to flee Prussia and get to France and England, where he expects to be welcomed by his mother's family. He asks his companion Katte to help him in this plan. However, being a second lieutenant bound by his officer's code, Katte at first declines.

The father-son conflict further escalates when Fritz reveals even heavier gambling debts than those the King already paid off. The King insults the Crown Prince, calling him "a liar and a coward" and has him put under arrest. In the barracks, he is forbidden to engage in his beloved flute playing or to read French literature.

At night the King returns earlier than usual and surprises the Crown Prince playing the flute in the music room together with his sister Wilhelmine. Katte, who is also present, manages to hide just in time. The angry King throws Fritz's books and flute into the open fire and orders the Crown Prince to accompany him on a trip to Southern Germany. Fritz, more than ever determined to go ahead with his escape plan, can count on Katte's support after this incident.

However, the escape fails, and both the Crown Prince and Second Lieutenant Katte are condemned by a court martial to custody at the fortress of Küstrin. However, the irate King arbitrarily amends the judgement against Katte to capital punishment and insists on having him actually executed.

The Crown Prince submits to the King's authority and is moved to better quarters in a palace. Nevertheless, in a visit by the King it is evident that the relationship between father and son is still very chilly and they are estranged. Fritz, who in the meantime has proved his "character," is now given his own household at Rheinsberg Castle where he can again follow his artistic inclinations.

Reconciliation between the estranged father and son does come about shortly before the death of the King. The last words of the Old King to the Young are: "Make Prussia great!" (The audience, aware of basic elements of German history included in their school curriculum, know that Friedrich would duly proceed to do just that.)

== Cast ==
- Emil Jannings as King Friedrich Wilhelm I
- Leopoldine Konstantin as Queen Sophie
- Werner Hinz as Crown Prince Friedrich
- Carola Höhn as Crown Princess
- Marieluise Claudius as Princess Wilhelmine
- Claus Clausen as Lieutenant Katte
- Friedrich Kayßler as Katte's Father
- Georg Alexander as The Margrave of Bayreuth
- Walter Janssen as von Natzmer
- Theodor Loos as Friedrich Eberhard von Rochow
- Heinrich Marlow as Grumbkow
- Fritz Odemar as Hotham
- Rudolf Klein-Rogge as Dessauer
- Leopold von Ledebur as von Waldow
- Friedrich Ulmer as von Reichmann
- Harry Hardt as von Seckendorff
- Luise Morland as Frau von Kamecke
- Emilia Unda as Frau von Ramen
- Ruth Eweler as Frl. von Sonsfeld
- Eugen Rex as Eversmann
- Ellen Frank as Countess Arnim
- Paul Henckels as Pesne
- Hans Leibelt as Knobelsdorf
- Walter Steinbeck as Kaiserlingk
- Hadrian Netto as First Usurer
- Egon Brosig as Second Usurer
