= The Onyx Head =

1917 film directed by Joe May

- Max Landa and Leopoldine Konstantin
- German: Der Onyxknopf
- Directed by: Joe May
- Written by: Ewald André Dupont; Joe May
- Produced by: Joe May
- Starring: Max Landa; Bruno Kastner; Leopoldine Konstantin
- Cinematography: Curt Courant
- Production company: May-Film
- Release date: 28 September 1917
- Country: Germany
- Languages: Silent; German intertitles

The Onyx Head (German: Der Onyxknopf) is a 1917 German silent crime film directed by Joe May and starring Max Landa, Bruno Kastner and Leopoldine Konstantin. It was part of a series of Joe Deebs detective films.

The film's sets were designed by the art director Uwe Jens Krafft.

== Cast ==
In alphabetical order

- Hugo Flink
- Bruno Kastner
- Leopoldine Konstantin as Geliebte von Deebs
- Max Landa as Joe Deebs
- Rudolf Lettinger
- Eva Maria
- Fritz Schulz
