= Celia M. Burleigh =

American minister and activist (1826–1875)

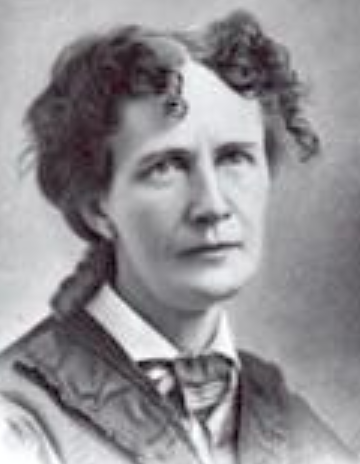
- Celia Burleigh, circa 1875
- Born: September 18, 1826; Cazenovia, New York, US
- Died: July 25, 1875 (aged 48)
- Known for: First woman pastor ordained into the Unitarian ministry
- Spouse(s): C. B. Kellum; Charles Chauncey Burr; William Henry Burleigh

Celia M. Burleigh (September 18, 1826 – July 25, 1875) (also Celia Burleigh, Celia C. Burleigh, Celia M. Tibbitts, Celia M. Kellum, Celia M. Burr, and Celia C. Burr Burleigh) was an American minister, writer, public speaker, and women's rights activist. She was involved with the woman's club movement and held various positions in women's rights clubs.

== Biography ==
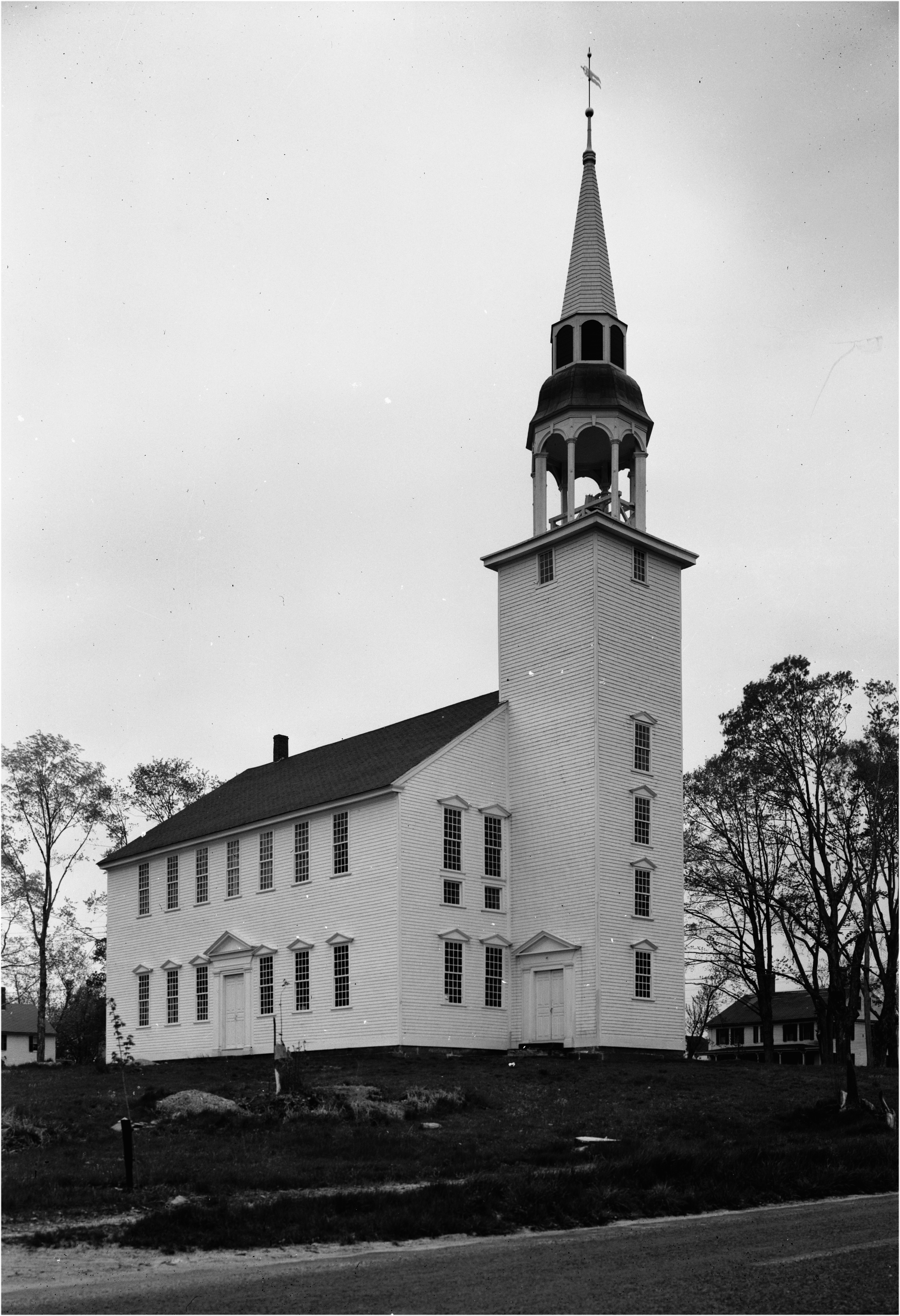
Unitarian Church Brooklyn, Connecticut

Burleigh was born at Cazenovia, New York, on September 18, 1826. She was the adopted child of Henry and Sara Tibbitts. She received her initial childhood schooling at a one-room school house a mile from her home. When she was sixteen she became a teacher at Cazenovia Seminary. Burleigh married Corydon Bryant Kellum of Albany, New York in 1844 when she was eighteen and they moved to Cincinnati, Ohio. The couple had two children who died young. In 1849 Burleigh became an editor of a journal called The Great West and worked at that for about a year. She divorced Kellum in 1850 and moved to New York City.

Burleigh then developed a relationship with Charles Chauncey Burr and married him in 1851. She wrote for newspapers and magazines using the pen name "Celia Burr." She also was a lyricist and published a few songs in collaboration with some musicians. The marriage to Burr ended in 1853. Starting in 1855 she served as a director for a boarding school. Later she became a teacher in Syracuse, New York. There she also wrote articles for the Christian Register and lectured on women's suffrage.

In 1862 Burleigh accepted a position as personal secretary for the educator Emma Willard, who was then 75. In 1864, she had developed a relationship with social activist William Henry Burleigh, a New York City harbor master. She had initially met him in 1850 in Syracuse. They married on September 7, 1865. They were close to the Second Unitarian Society minister, John White Chadwick. Later the Burleighs separated, but both continued to live in Brooklyn, New York. He continued as a harbor master and she took up a career in journalism.

Burleigh in 1868 was one of the founding members of Sorosis and became its main fund-raiser and lecturer. The society was formed in protest to one of her associates being excluded from an all men's press club dinner. The organization consisted of twelve women that wanted to promote deeper association between women writers and artists. She helped organize the Brooklyn Woman's Club in 1869, becoming its first president. She served as secretary for the American Equal Rights Association in early 1870. Burleigh stood on the platform at the Convention of the Northwestern Woman's Suffrage Association alongside Susan B. Anthony. She was a public speaker and activist for women's rights.

Burleigh picked up an interest in ministry. She was invited to be the summer minister at the Unitarian church of Brooklyn, Connecticut in July 1871. She developed a strong following in a short time and was asked to stay on as their permanent minister. Burleigh became the first woman pastor ordained into the Unitarian ministry. She was ordained and given the parish in Brooklyn on October 5, 1871. Among those officiating at the ordination were Reverend John Chadwick and Julia Ward Howe. In 1873 she resigned from the ministry because of poor health due to breast cancer. Burleigh spent her last days in Syracuse and died there on July 27, 1875. She is buried at the city's South Cemetery.

== Sources ==
- Benowitz, June Melby (18 August 2017). Encyclopedia of American Women. ABC-CLIO. ISBN 978-1-4408-3987-0. "Celia C. Burleigh, an advocate for woman suffrage, was the first woman to be ordained a minister in the Unitarian Church and the first female minister in any denomination in Connecticut."
- Coggeshall, William T. (1860). Poets and Poetry of the West. p. 497.
- Cooke, George Willis (1902). Unitarianism in America. American Unitarian Association. p. 370.
- Franck, Irene M. (July 1995). Women's world: a timeline. HarperPerennial. ISBN 978-0-06-273336-8. "Celia M. Burleigh became the first ordained woman minister in the Unitarian Church, serving in Brooklyn, Connecticut."
- Furman, Robert (2015). Brooklyn Heights. Arcadia Publishing. ISBN 978-1-62619-954-5. "Its minister, John White Chadwick, in 1870 ordained the first female Unitarian minister, Celia C. Burr Burleigh."
- Harris, Mark W. (29 July 2009). A to Z of Unitarian Universalism. Scarecrow Press. ISBN 978-0-8108-6333-0.
- Hoogenboom, Olive (1987). First Unitarian Church of Brooklyn. The Church. "Celia Burleigh's first sermon was preached in Brooklyn in July 1871 at the Third Church's Unity Chapel. At forty-five, she was the first woman to be ordained a Unitarian minister, and on the same day, 5 October 1871, she was installed as minister in Brooklyn, Connecticut."
- Kane, Joseph Nathan (1997). Famous First Facts. New York City: H. W. Wilson Company. ISBN 0824209303. "An organized movement of Unitarians was founded by William Ellery Channing in 1819. The first woman ordained as a Unitarian minister was Celia C. Burleigh, who was given a parish in Brooklyn, CT, on October 5, 1871."
- Lincoln, Allen B. (1920). History of Windham County, Ct. S.J. Clarke Publishing Company.
- Lindley, Susan Hill (2008). Women in American Religious History. Westminster John Knox Press. ISBN 978-0-664-22454-7. "First woman ordained Unitarian minister Celia Burleigh was born in Cazenovia, New York."
- Mangan, Gregg (2 March 2015). On This Day in Connecticut History. Arcadia Publishing Incorporated. ISBN 978-1-62585-195-6. "On October 5, 1871, Burleigh became the first woman ordained by the Unitarian Church."
- Murdock, Virgil E. (1976). American Unitarian Association. Murdock.
- Stanton, Elizabeth Cady (1997). Papers of Elizabeth Stanton and Susan B. Anthony. Rutgers University Press. ISBN 978-0-8135-2318-7.
