= Edmond Samuels =

Australian pharmacist, composer and author

- Born: Edmond Samuels; 17 March 1895; Walcha, New South Wales, Australia
- Died: 10 February 1973 (aged 77); St Leonards, New South Wales, Australia
- Other names: Eddie Samuels
- Education: Fort Street Public School; University of Sydney; Pharmacy Board of New South Wales
- Known for: Pharmacy, composer, and author
- Spouse: Joseph Smith

Edmond Samuels (17 March 1895 – 2 October 1973) was an Australian pharmacist, composer and author. For much of his childhood and adult life Samuels was a creative and social outsider looking for ways to express an artistic alternative self. His creative output profiles queer Sydney in the 1930s and 1940s.

== Early life ==
Samuels was born in Walcha, New South Wales, the fourth son of Mary (née Michaelson) and Jacob Samuels. His Jewish father came to Australia from Lithuania, by way of Scotland, in the 1880s. In Edinburgh Jacob met and fell in love with a very young girl by the name of Mary. The romance did not affect his determination to make a life in Australia. Mary's father forbade her marriage to a young man with no fortune and no immediate prospects of acquiring one. Jacob Samuels emigrated to Australia, established himself in Sydney and wrote to Edinburgh for Mary and enclosing her passage as an earnest of good intent. Her family allowed her to go and she travelled across the world to marry a man she scarcely knew. At 24 years of age in 1887 Jacob Samuels married Mary Michaelson aged 19. The Samuels family ran a general store that sold men's and boy's clothing, dressmaking materials, remnants, blankets and jewellery and also engaged in watch repairs and tailoring. The first son of the family, Harry, was born in 1889, Louis was born in 1891, Morris was born in 1893 and the baby Edmond was born in 1895. In his family he was always known as Eddie rather to his distaste as he did not like the diminutive. Jacob Samuels was mayor of Walcha in 1902. That year Samuels's older brother Morris died in Walcha. In 1904 the Samuels family moved back to Sydney. Little is known of Samuels early education although it is said that he attended Fort Street Model School, Observatory Hill, from 1907 until 1911. The school magazine The Fortian, established in 1899, has no mention of any students by the name of Samuels but as the family were living and working in Sydney at the time it is possible that Samuels briefly attended Fort Street Public School at Observatory Hill before the high school moved to Petersham.

== World War I ==
During World War I, Samuels was mobilised for service and volunteered with the First Australian Imperial Force (AIF) but was rejected as medically unfit to serve. He served as an officer of the guard at an internment camp at Berrima Gaol. Lieutenant Samuels later described the conditions under which internees were detained saying that they "were nobly held in the traditions of our great Empire". In the years prior to the war his elder brother, Louis Samuels, worked as a journalist at the Sydney Hebrew Standard and the Sydney Morning Herald. Louis enlisted in the AIF in September 1915, and subsequently served in the 1st Field Artillery Brigade. He was awarded the Military Cross for gallantry at Jeancourt in 1918.

== Pharmacist ==
Samuels is listed as a Pharmacy student in the 1914 Calendar of the University of Sydney however he did not sit any exams pre-war. He sat exams in Chemistry 1, Botany 1, and Materia Medica in 1918. He is next listed in the 1919 University Calendar as having passed the subjects required to sit the Pharmacy Board of New South Wales exams but is not a graduate of University of Sydney. From 1918 he ran a pharmacy and headache bar at 48 Castlereagh Street, Sydney. Samuels' Famous Cough Linctus and theatrical Melody Cold Cream were used by many theatre professionals, and his headache bar enjoyed an international reputation. Throughout most of his adult life Samuels lived in apartments in Potts Point.

== Composer ==
Samuels composed many popular songs and a number of musicals including: At the Silver Swan (the first musical with an Australian setting to be produced in London, at the Palace Theatre, in 1936), and The Highwayman which opened at the Kings Theatre, Melbourne in 1951 and subsequently toured to other states.

== Author ==
The first publication Samuels was responsible for was An Illustrated Diary of Australian Internment Camps (1919), which he dedicated to his ex-serviceman brother's Lieutenant Louis Samuels M.C. Australian Field Artillery and Corporal Harry Samuels A.S.C, A.I.F. Others included Queer Crossroads (1931) described in the press reviews as "a symposium of prose and verse", the novel Why not tell? (1934) and a book of reminiscences If The Cap Fits (1972).

== Portrait ==
In 1946 a portrait of Samuels was painted by Frank Hodgkinson and hung in the Archibald Prize exhibition at the Art Gallery of New South Wales.

== Later life and death ==
In 1950, Washington H Soul Pattinson bought the Edmond Samuels Pty Ltd pharmacy business Samuels retired to a house he built, in the then mostly rural suburb of Castle Hill, with his companion Joseph Smith. At the same time Patrick White, and his partner Manoly Lascaris, lived on acreage in the same area. In his death notice in 1973, Samuels was listed in the Sydney Morning Herald as formerly residing in Potts Point. He was survived by his nephew Gordon Samuels who served as the 36th Governor of New South Wales having been a Judge of the New South Wales Court of Appeal, Chancellor of the University of New South Wales and Chairman of the Law Reform Commission of New South Wales. His wife was the actor Dr Jacqueline Samuels (who was known by the stage name of Jacqueline Knott) continuing the Samuels family tradition of involvement in the theatre.
