= Charles Chauncey Burr =

American journalist

- Born: c. 1817; Maine, United States USA
- Died: 1 March 1883; West Hoboken, Hudson County, New Jersey
- Occupations: Journalist, author, publisher
- Movement: Abolitionism, Copperheads
- Spouse: Celia M. Burleigh (1851-1853)

Charles Chauncey Burr (c. 1817–1883) was an American journalist, author and publisher. A native of Maine, he became an intimate friend of Edgar Allan Poe and his family, and published a number of magazines and newspapers.

== Life and career ==
Burr had a varied career (he had been the publicity agent for Lola Montez, the former mistress of Ludwig I of Bavaria) and is credited with having written her autobiography. At some point he acquired the title "Reverend", though scholars do not know how. Jay Hubbell, writing in Publications of the Modern Language Association, remarks that even his birth and death dates are uncertain. The authors of A general history of the Burr family note that their questionnaire was not returned; they did know, apparently, that he was a well-known lecturer and had published a newspaper in Hoboken, New Jersey, called the Hudson Co. Register.

== Magazines and politics ==
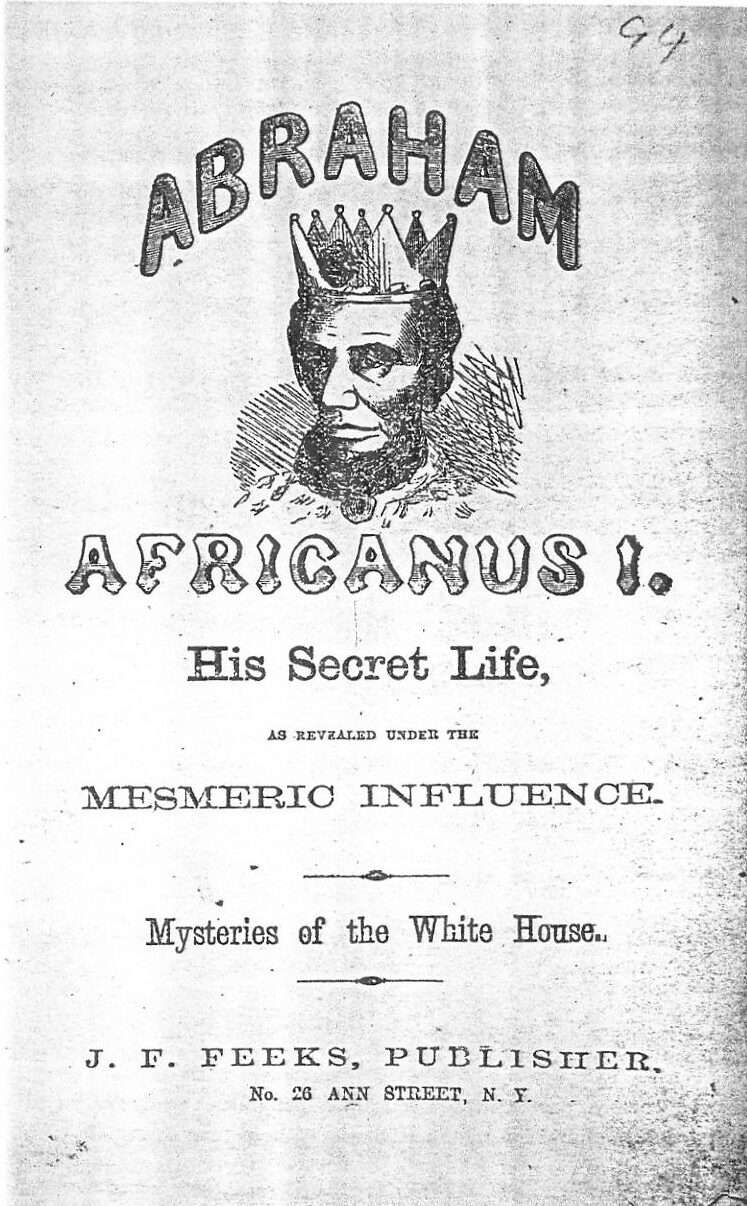
Copperhead pamphlet from 1864 by Charles Chauncey Burr

Burr founded a number of magazines including the Philadelphia-based periodical Nineteenth Century (first issue published January 1847), the Bergen County, New Jersey Democrat and the New York-based The Old Guard. In his youth, he appears to have been a "militant reformer" — he praised the Quaker abolitionist John Greenleaf Whittier's poem "The Reformer" in the first issue of Nineteenth Century and called Whittier "one of the best the purest of all poets". In later issues of the Nineteenth Century, "he published materials indicating a strong anti-slavery bias". Later in life, though, he changed sides completely - during the American Civil War he was a Copperhead. The first issue of The Old Guard contains a lengthy invective by Burr against abolitionist preachers such as Henry Ward Beecher, saying that their "savage war-cries" indicate they have sided with the devil.

=== Political activism after the Civil War ===
After the war, Burr remained active in politics. In an 1866 speech to the Anti-Abolition State Rights Society, he castigated Republicans such as Thaddeus Stevens and Charles Sumner, and criticized some fellow Democrats, for attempting to steal "Black Republican thunder", saying such Democrats were to Republicans as mulattoes (he also called them mongrels) were to Negroes. He also participated in the 1872 Democratic National Convention.

== Friendship with Poe ==
Burr had become good friends with Edgar Allan Poe, whose poetry he admired and imitated (in anonymous poems published in The Old Guard) and had assisted Poe physically and financially during the latter's visit to Philadelphia, one of his last jaunts before his death. Poe wrote to his mother-in-law on 14 July 1849, thanking Burr for his help, "I am indebted for more than life itself to B[urr] ... When all failed me, he stood my friend, got me money, and saw me off in the cars for Richmond."

Burr repaid Poe posthumously by publishing a number of pro-Poe articles in The Old Guard, even poems clearly based on Poe's. Of special value to Poe scholars is an article published in the June 1866 issue, "Poe and his Biographer, Griswold", in which Burr presents documentary evidence that countered some of the criticism leveled against Poe by Rufus Wilmot Griswold, including letters by those who knew Poe. Burr also officiated at the marriage of another famous writer of the era, George Lippard, held on a rock at sunset above the Wissahickon.
