= In the Ecstasy of Billions (1922 film) =

1922 film

- Directed by: Josef Berger
- Written by: Robert Heymann; Wilhelm Thiele
- Starring: Dary Holm
- Production company: Union-Film
- Release date: 1922
- Country: Germany
- Languages: Silent; German intertitles

In the Ecstasy of Billions (German: Im Rausche der Milliarden) is a 1922 German silent film directed by Josef Berger and starring Dary Holm.

== Cast ==
In alphabetical order

- Mary Brandt
- Carla Ferra
- Fritz Greiner
- Dary Holm
- Ernst Rückert
- Ernst Schrumpf

== Bibliography ==
- Bock, Hans-Michael; Bergfelder, Tim, eds. (2009). The Concise Cinegraph: Encyclopaedia of German Cinema. New York: Berghahn Books. ISBN 978-1-57181-655-9.
