= Lola Montez (1919 film) =

- Directed by: Rudolf Walther-Fein
- Starring: Alfred Abel; Leopoldine Konstantin; Helga Lassen
- Production company: Luna-Film
- Release date: 1919
- Country: Germany
- Languages: Silent; German intertitles

Lola Montez is a 1919 German silent film directed by Rudolf Walther-Fein and starring Hans Albers, Marija Leiko and Oscar Marion. It is a loose sequel to the 1918 film Lola Montez, and is sometimes known by the alternative titles of Lola Montez, Part II. or Lola Montez, In the Court of King Ludwig I of Bavaria.

== Cast ==
In alphabetical order

- Hans Albers
- Marija Leiko
- Oscar Marion
- Gustav Adolf Semler
- Maria Zelenka

== Bibliography ==
- Richter, Simon. Women, Pleasure, Film: What Lolas Want. Palgrave Macmillan, 2013.
