= Lola Montez (1962 film) =

- Ad SMH 7 May 1962
- Written by: Alan Burke
- Directed by: Alan Burke
- Starring: Brigid Lenihan
- Music by: Peter Stannard
- Country of origin: Australia
- Original language: English

Production
- Producer: Alan Burke
- Running time: 90 minutes
- Production company: ABC

Original release
- Release: 28 April 1962 (Melbourne)
- Release: 7 May 1962 (Sydney)

Lola Montez was a 1962 Australian TV play based on the musical of the same name.

The TV production was directed by Alan Burke, who had written the book for the musical. Australian TV drama was relatively rare at the time.

== Cast ==
- Brigid Lenihan as Lola Montez
- Campbell Copelin as Seekamp
- Mary Duchesne as Mary in Bavaria
- Alida Glasbecek as Gisela
- Patsy Hemingway as Jane
- Alan Hopgood as Smith
- John Kendall as Jocko
- Reginald Newson as Wilson
- Anne Peterson as Nancy
- Ron Pinnell as Crosbie
- Rex Reid as King Ludwig I of Bavaria
- Beverley Richards as Ilsa
- Johnny Rohan as Daniel
- Leslie Sinclair as Mac
- Frank Wilson as Sam

== Production ==
Burke says because he directed, things were not misunderstood. Johnny Rohan was cast as Daniel after Burke saw him singing on a pop show. For the role of Lola, Burke wanted to cast an actress who could sing, and picked New Zealander Brigid Lenihan, who had appeared in shows such as Little Woman, Revue 61 and A Night Out.

It was filmed in the ABC's Southbank Studios in Melbourne. Choreography was by Rex Reid, and Mary Duchesne danced the Lola in the Bavaria sequence. The dance ensemble included Kelvin Coe and Barry Moreland. There were 33 actors, singers and dancers.

== Songs ==
- "Southerly Buster" - sung by miners
- "Saturday Girl" - sung to by Daniel to Jane
- "Let Me Sing Let Me Dance" - sung by Daniel to Lola
- "Maria Dolores Eliza Rosamia" - sung by Sam and Lola
- "A Lady Finds a Love" - sung by Lola and Dan
- "I'm the Man"
- "There's Gold in Them There Hills"
- "Lady Lady Please Don't Cry"
- "Summer Been and Fore"
- I Can See a Town"
- "He's Mine"
- "Beware"
- "I Alone"
- "Partner Name Your Poison"

== Reception ==
The Age praised the "superb acting" of Lenihan but felt apart from Frank Wilson that "others in the show... gave stereotyped performances." The Sydney Morning Herald thought the character of Lola remained "the most intractable fact" of the production thinking she was better used to "material for a sensitive play which hardly in with the lusty, simplicity of a musical that sounds like a marriage of Oklahoma and Paint Your Wagon... All the same, it was interesting to have the chance of seeing again a. musical that promised so much for the talents that combined to devise it; and also a little saddening to think how little has been heard of these talents since."

The Sunday Herald said "it was a brilliant piece of work, sizzling in pace from start to finish, with a cast and chorus as perfectly rehearsed and drilled as an Army platoon. "Lola Montez" was good on stage; it emerges on television even better; almost as though it had been originally written with the small screen in mind. The only flaw in the entire 90 minutes so far as I was concerned, and it was a minor one, was [the]... dream sequence flashback to Lola's days as a court beauty. It was competently done, but it dragged a little toward the end."

Frank Roberts of The Bulletin admitted to missing the first half of the broadcast but still ran his review saying "the part I did see was so lacking in entertainment values that the use of 90 minutes of prime viewing time for a show of that standard would not prove courage, but sheer foolhardiness... On “Lola Montez’s” showing, very little of the talent on view deserved encouraging. It is difficult to criticise the production piecemeal because nearly all of its ingredients were uniformly dreadful."

== See also ==
- List of television plays broadcast on Australian Broadcasting Corporation (1960s)
