= Lola Montez (1918 film) =

- Directed by: Robert Heymann
- Written by: Robert Heymann
- Based on: Lola Montez Schauspiel in drei Akten; 1917 novel by Adolf Paul
- Starring: Alfred Abel; Leopoldine Konstantin; Helga Lassen
- Cinematography: Ernest Plhak
- Production company: Luna-Film
- Release date: 1918
- Country: Germany
- Languages: Silent; German intertitles

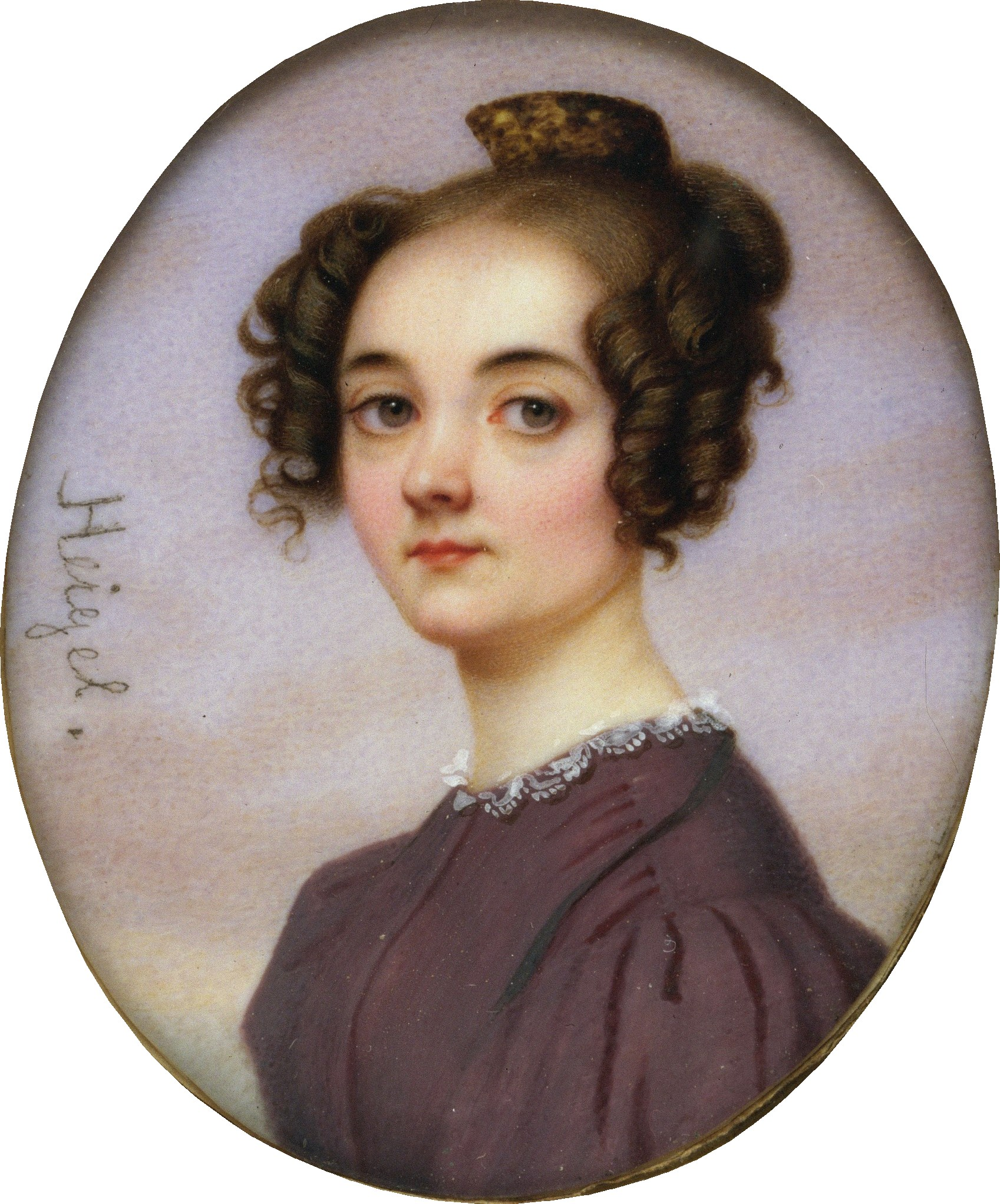
Lola Montez portrait by Josef Heigel, before 1840

Lola Montez is a 1918 German silent historical film directed by Robert Heymann and starring Alfred Abel, Leopoldine Konstantin and Helga Lassen. It portrays the life of Lola Montez. It was followed by a sequel in 1919 with a different actress playing the title role.

The film's art direction was by August Rinaldi.

== Cast ==
- Alfred Abel as Räuber - Madons, Karlistenführer
- Leopoldine Konstantin as Lola Montez
- Helga Lassen as Anita, Lolas Kammermädchen
- Bodo Serp as Riccardo, Mitglied der Bande Madons
- Inge Törnquist as Pepita, Lolas Kammermädchen
- Ito Waghalter as Marquis de Bocheville, französischer Attaché
- Hans Wassmann as Sir Eduards, englischer Gesandter - Attaché
- Hugo Werner-Kahle as Don Espartero, Regent von Spanien
- Maria Zelenka

== Bibliography ==
- Richter, Simon. Women, Pleasure, Film: What Lolas Want. Palgrave Macmillan, 2013.
