= Leopoldine Konstantin =

Austrian actress

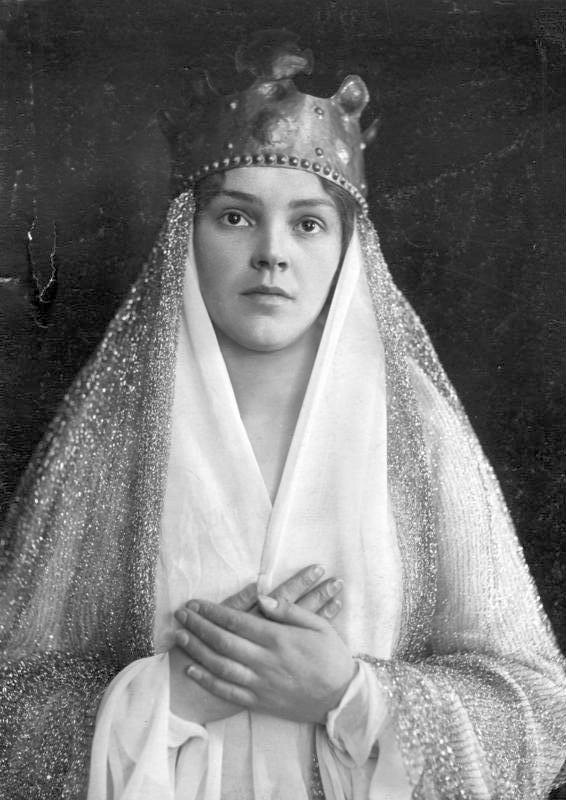
- Konstantin in 1910
- Born: Leopoldine Eugenie Amelie Konstanti; 12 March 1886; Brünn, Moravia, Austria-Hungary
- Died: 14 December 1965 (aged 79); Hietzing, Vienna, Austria
- Occupation: Actress
- Years active: 1907–1948
- Spouses: Alexander Strakosch (m. 1906; div. 1924) Geza Herczeg (m. 1924; div. 1938)
- Children: 1

Leopoldine Konstantin (born Leopoldine Eugenie Amelie Konstanti; 12 March 1886 – 14 December 1965) was an Austrian actress. She played in Frank Wedekind's Spring Awakening (1907), Shakespeare's Romeo and Juliet (1907), A Winter's Tale (1908), and A Midsummer Night's Dream (1910). She also had a notable supporting role in Alfred Hitchcock's Notorious (1946).

== Early life ==
Leopoldine Konstantin was born as Leopoldine Eugenie Amelie Konstanti on 12 March 1886 in Moravia, Austria-Hungary. She made her debut in the Deutsches Theater in Berlin in 1907. From 1911 she was to be found at the Kammerspiele in Berlin and became known in the Berlin salons. She moved to Vienna in 1916 and by 1924 she was playing the title role in Friedrich Schiller's Mary Stuart.

== Career ==
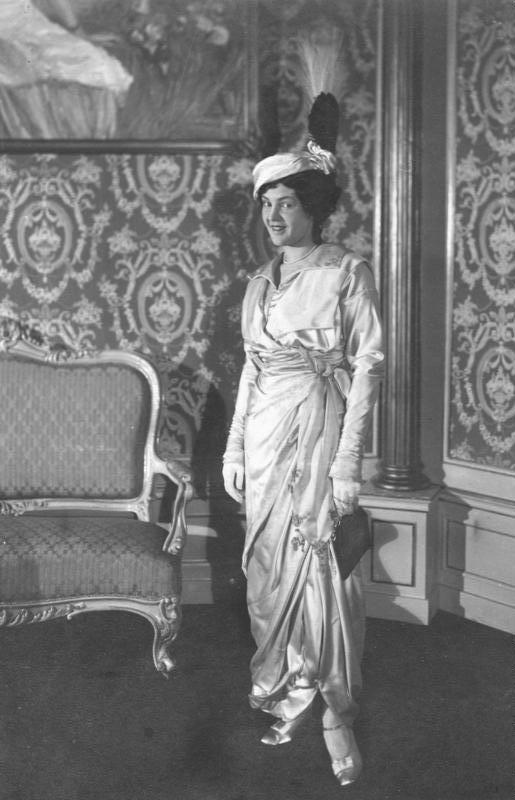
Konstantin in 1913

Starting in 1912 she also played in silent films, initially in title roles. She turned away from this medium when, after the First World War, she was offered increasingly minor parts. In 1923 she had a house built in Westerland for herself and her son, Alexander.

From 1933 she returned to film work, and in 1935 she returned to Austria. In that same year she moved to the United States via Britain. As she spoke no English at that time, she had to take a job as a factory worker until, after intensive language study, she landed a supporting role in Alfred Hitchcock's 1946 film Notorious, in which she played Claude Rains' mother, although she was only three years older than Rains.

== Personal life ==
Konstantin took acting lessons with Alexander Strakosch, whom she married shortly afterwards in 1906. They divorced in 1924. In the same year, she married Hungarian counsellor and author Géza Herczeg, and had a son, Alexander. They divorced in 1938.

== Later years and death ==
She performed in two television series in 1948 and returned to Vienna. Her last acting work involved sporadic theatre roles and poetry readings on the radio. She died on 14 December 1965 in Hietzing, Vienna, Austria at the age of 79.

== Filmography ==
- 1910: Sumurûn - Tänzerin
- 1912: Gebannt und erlöst (Banned and redeemed) (Short)
- 1912: Die Heldin der schwarzen Berge (The Heroine of the Black Mountains)
- 1913: Schuldig - Tochter Julia Lehr
- 1913: Die Insel der Seligen (The Isle of the Blessed) - Circe
- 1913: Ultimo - Gouvernante
- 1913: Die Hand des Schicksals (The Hand of Fate)
- 1913: Vater und Sohn (Father and Son) (Short)
- 1914: Maria Magdalena - Klara, Anton's Tochter
- 1914: Verhängnisvolles Glück
- 1914: Kleine weiße Sklaven (Little White Slaves) - Schwester Luise Sanden
- 1915: Der Dolch im Strumpfband
- 1915: Die zerbrochene Puppe (The Smashed Doll) (Short)
- 1915: The Dancer
- 1916: Das Wiegenlied (The Lullaby)
- 1916: Der Radiumraub - Räuberin
- 1917: Aus vergessenen Akten (From Forgotten Files) - Täterin
- 1917: The Onyx Head - Geliebte von Deebs
- 1917: Eine Nacht in der Stahlkammer - Kunstschützin Celestine
- 1918: Der Volontär
- 1918: Lola Montez - Lola Montez
- 1919: Der Volontär (The Volunteer) - A táncosnõ
- 1919: Lilli's Marriage - Suse
- 1919: Der Verrat der Gräfin Leonie (The Betrayal of Countess Leonie)
- 1920: Können Gedanken töten? (Can Thoughts Kill?) - Frau Luda
- 1920: Christian Wahnschaffe
- 1920: Der Shawl der Kaiserin Katharina II (The Shawl of Empress Catherine II)
- 1920: President Barrada
- 1921: Der Silberkönig (The Silver King)
- 1932: Ein toller Einfall
- 1933: Season in Cairo - Ellinor Blackwell
- 1934: A Precocious Girl - Maria, her mother
- 1934: Es tut sich was um Mitternacht (It's happening at midnight) - Frau Dr. Wegener
- 1934: Liebe dumme Mama - Helene Burkardt
- 1934: Princess Turandot - Kaiserin
- 1935: The Old and the Young King - Königin Sophie Dorothee
- 1935: Fresh Wind from Canada - Frau Olden
- 1936: Girls' Dormitory - Fräulein Leers
- 1937: Und du, mein Schatz, fährst mit (And you, my darling, go with them) - Donna Juana de Villafranca
- 1937: Another World - Lady Brandmore
- 1946: Notorious - Madame Anna Sebastian

== Gallery ==
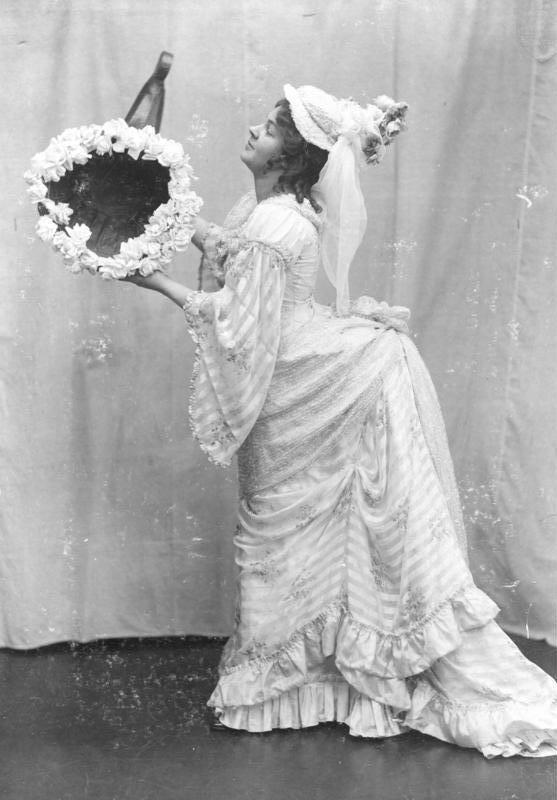
As Fortuna in the German theatre in 1911

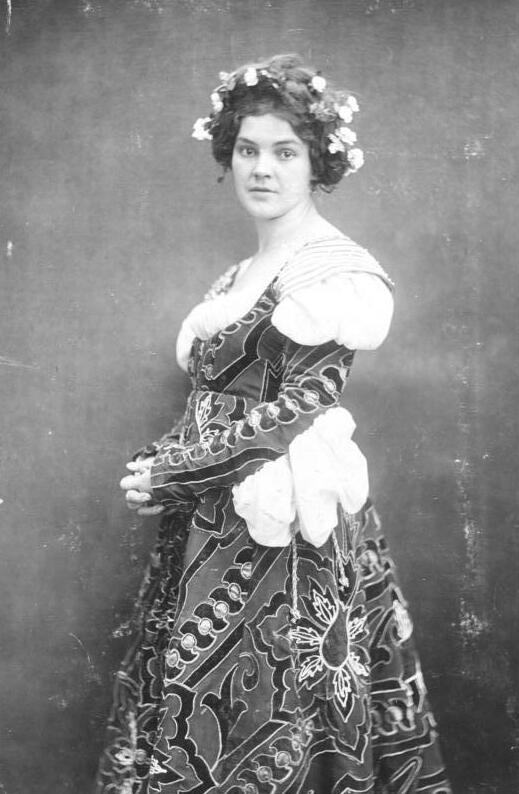
Leopoldine Konstantin as Everyone in 1912

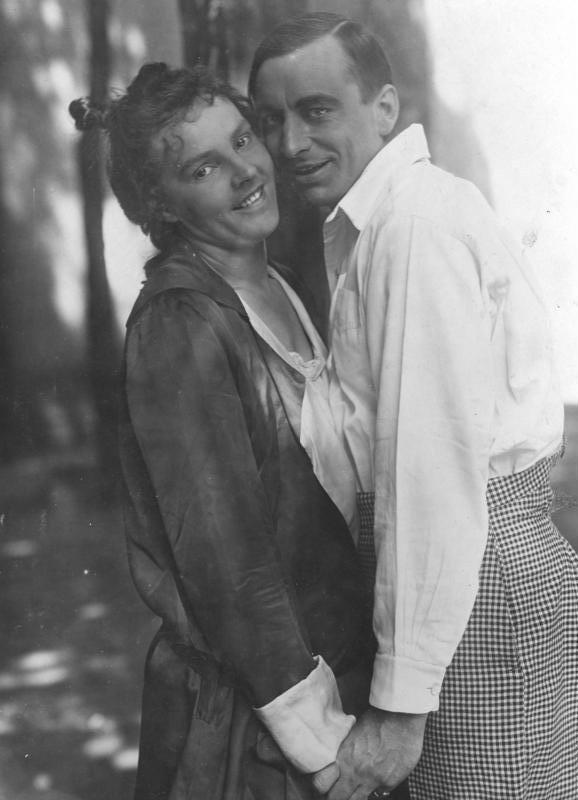
Konstantin in 1917 (with Curt Goetz)
