= Lola Montez (musical) =

1962 Australian film by Alan Burke

- Original cast recording
- Music: Peter Stannard
- Lyrics: Peter Benjamin
- Book: Alan Burke
- Productions: 1958 Melbourne; 1958 Brisbane/Sydney

Lola Montez is a 1958 Australian musical. It was written by Alan Burke, Peter Stannard, and Peter Benjamin and focuses on four days of Lola Montez visiting the Ballarat Goldfields.

== Background ==
Stannard, Benjamin, and Burke were all friends from university who wanted to write a musical together. Alan Burke says he had never heard of Lola Montez until he heard her mentioned in a program on the ABC. He was attracted to the subject because it was Australian but had international appeal; he did not want to make something along the lines of On Our Selection. Also, since the lead was a performer, the songs would come naturally.

== Productions ==
=== Original production ===
Hugh Hunt of the Australian Elizabethan Theatre Trust heard several auditions of the work and agreed to fund a trial production at the Union Theatre Repertory Company in Melbourne in early 1958. It was directed by John Sumner. The production was very popular.

==== Cast ====
- Justine Rettick as Lola
- Neil Fitzpatrick
- Glen Tomasetti
- Patricia Connoly
- Alan Hopgood
- George Ogilvie
- Robin Ramsay
- Jon Finlayson
- Monica Maughan.

=== Australian Elizabethan Theatre Trust production ===
The Trust took up their option and launched a new production. George Carden was brought in to direct.

Alan Burke says his dream Lola was Vivien Leigh but that he wanted Moyra Fraser to star. Hugh Hunt imported 25 year old Mary Preston from the United Kingdom to play the lead. Burke said Preston was hopelessly miscast playing a 37 year old aging beauty.

The show trialled in Brisbane for a short season. Michael Cole, playing Daniel, was sacked in Brisbane because of his voice. He was replaced by Eric Thornton, who Burke said was too old - a 45-year-old man playing a 19-year-old. The musical moved to Sydney, where it opened on 22 October 1958. Burke says it lost £30,000 and "was a show loved by very few people but it went into legend." However the show did run for more than three months. Michael Cole's single recording of "Saturday Girl" became a minor hit.

Cole later appeared in the TV musical Pardon Miss Westcott which was commissioned from the writers of Lola Montez.

==== Cast ====
- Mary Preston as Lola
- Frank Wilson as Sam
- Michael Cole, then Eric Thornton, as Daniel

The production and costumes were designed by Hermia Boyd. A retrospective celebration of the work was mounted in February 2018 at the Smorgon Family Plaza, Arts Centre Melbourne.

== 1962 television play ==
Lola Montez was adapted for TV by the Australian Broadcasting Corporation in 1962.

== Lola and the Highwayman ==
In 1965, the ABC presented a TV special called Lola and the Highwayman.

== Revised edition ==
The musical has been much revived since in amateur and school productions.

The musical was heavily revised in 1988 for a production in Canberra.
