= Lola Montez =

Irish dancer and actress

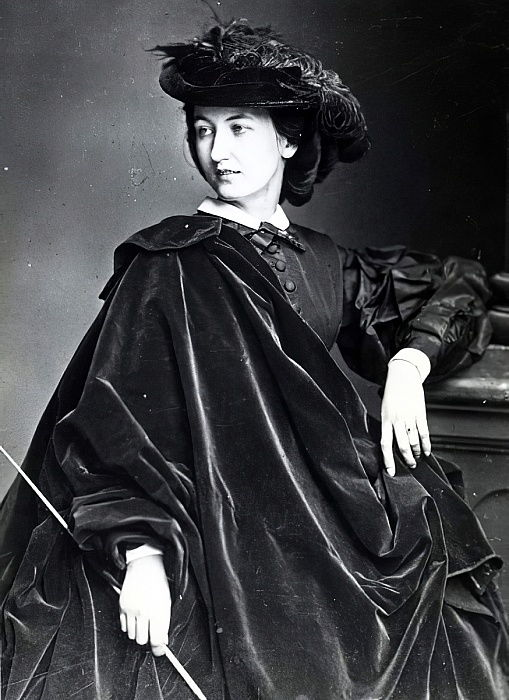
- Lola Montez photographed by Antoine Samuel Adam-Salomon, 1860
- Born: Eliza Rosanna Gilbert; 17 February 1821; Grange, County Sligo, Connacht, Ireland
- Died: 17 January 1861 (aged 39); Brooklyn, New York, U.S.
- Other names: Donna Lola Montez, Maria Dolores Eliza Rosanna Gilbert, Gräfin von Landsfeld
- Occupations: Dancer, actress, lecturer, author
- Spouses: Lieutenant Thomas James (m. 1837; div. 1842) George Trafford Heald (m. 1849; div. 1850) Patrick Hull (m. 1853; div. 1853)
- Partner: King Ludwig I of Bavaria (1846–1848)

Signature
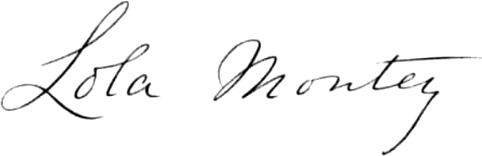

Eliza Rosanna Gilbert (17 February 1821 – 17 January 1861), better known by the stage name Lola Montez (/moʊnˈtɛz/), was an Irish dancer and actress who became famous as a Spanish dancer, courtesan, and mistress of King Ludwig I of Bavaria, who made her Gräfin (Countess) von Landsfeld. At the start of the Revolutions of 1848 in the German states, she was forced to flee. She proceeded to the United States via Austria, Switzerland, France and London, to return to her work as an entertainer and lecturer.

== Biography ==
=== Early life ===
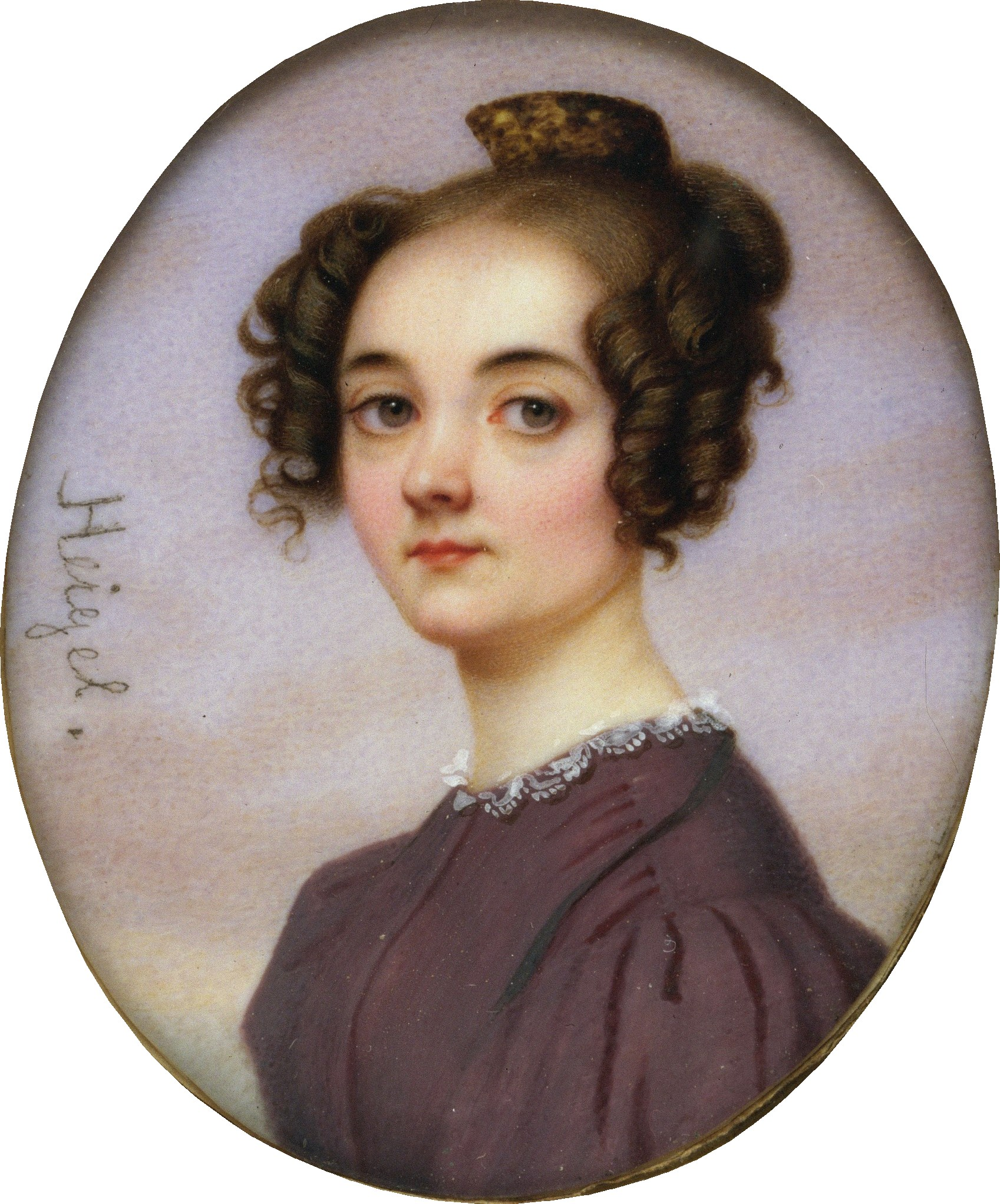
Lola Montez portrait by Joseph Heigel before 1840

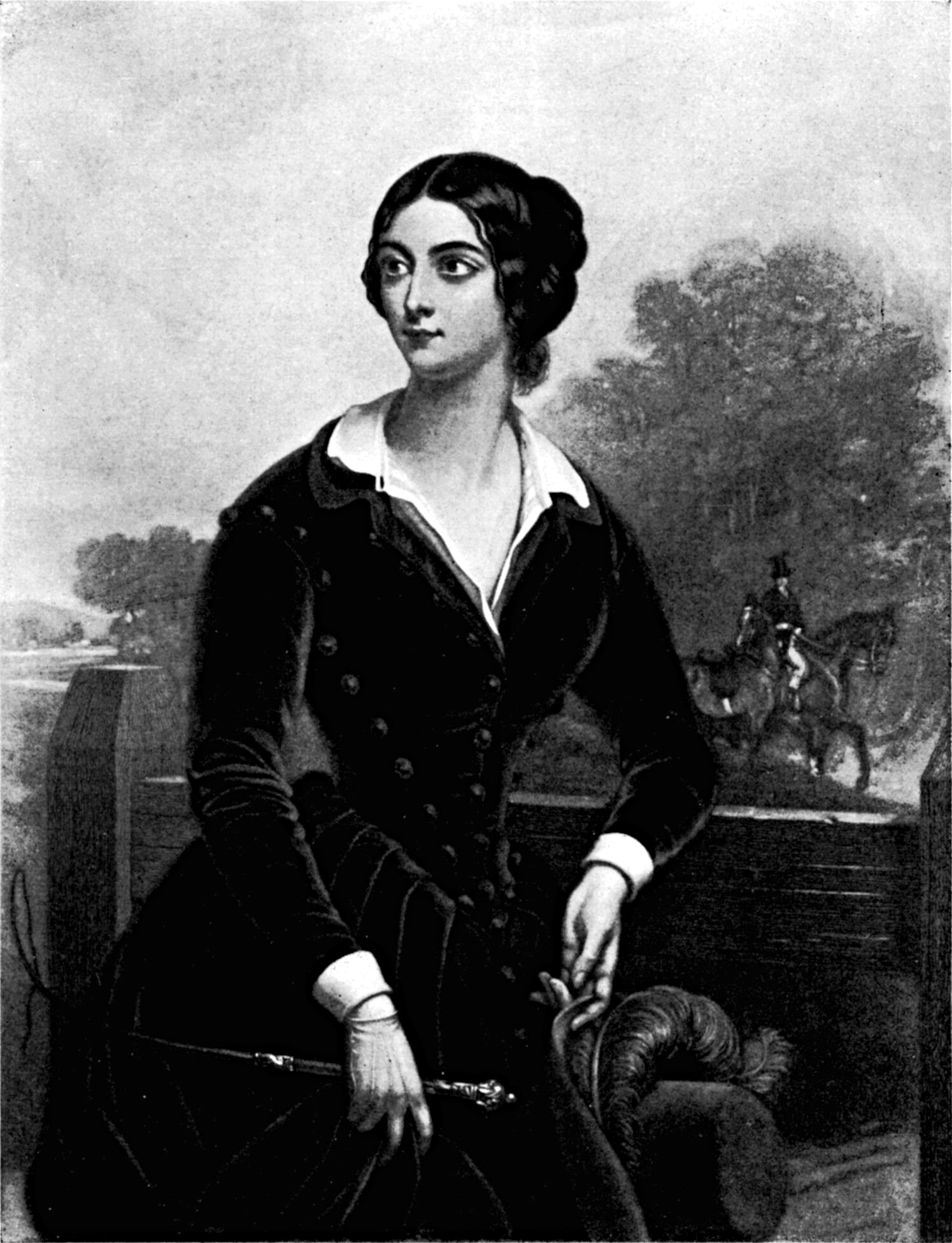
Lola Montez's lithography

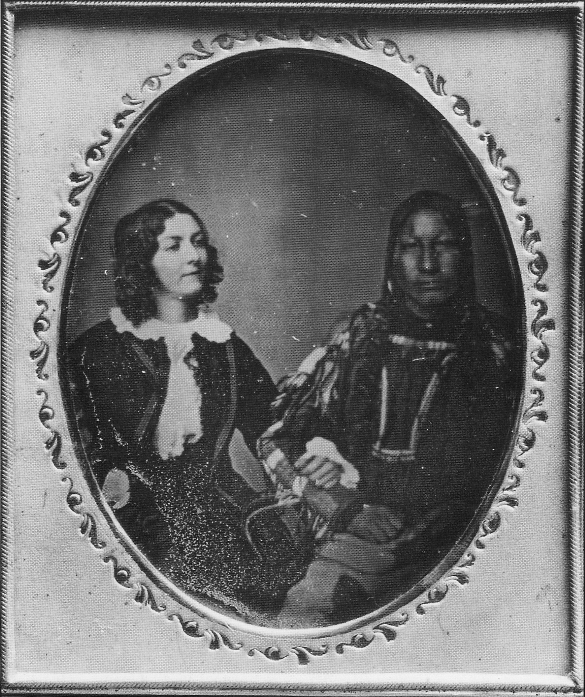
Lola Montez with Alights-on-a-Cloud, 1850s

Elizabeth Rosanna Gilbert was born into an Anglo-Irish family, the daughter of Ensign Edward Gilbert and Elizabeth ("Eliza") Oliver. Elizabeth's birthdate has been subject to confusion, and for many years it was accepted that she was born in Limerick, as she herself claimed, possibly on 23 June 1818; this is the year that was engraved on her headstone. But her baptismal certificate, which came to light in the late 1990s, bears an annotation indicating that she was born on 17 February 1821 in the village of Grange in the north of County Sligo, where her father's regiment, the 25th Scottish Borderers, had been billeted.

Elizabeth's parents were married on 29 April 1820. Her father's exact origins are a mystery, but are probably from the Anglo-Irish nobility or well-to-do gentry. He was 24 when his daughter was born, and his wife, Eliza, was 15. Her family, the Olivers, were a prominent Anglo-Irish family of the Protestant ascendancy in County Cork, where Edward Gilbert's regiment was stationed. But Eliza was an illegitimate child, and at the time of her wedding she was apprenticed as a milliner's assistant. Her father, Charles Silver Oliver, was a former High Sheriff of Cork and former member of Irish Parliament for a constituency in County Limerick. Their residence was Castle Oliver, which stood a thousand yards southwest of the current castle of the same name in Limerick.

The newly constituted family's principal residence was at King House in Boyle, County Roscommon, until early 1823, when they journeyed to Liverpool, England (where Elizabeth was baptized at St. Peter's Church on 16 February), to depart there for India on 14 March.

Shortly after their arrival in India, Edward Gilbert died of cholera. Her mother, who was then 19, married Lieutenant Patrick Craigie the next year. Craigie quickly came to care for the young Eliza, but her spoiled and half-wild ways concerned him greatly. Eventually, it was agreed that she would be sent back to Britain to attend school, staying with Craigie's father in Montrose, Scotland. The "strange Indian girl" soon became known as a mischief-maker. Once, she stuck flowers into an elderly man's wig during a church service; once, she ran through the streets naked.

At age ten, Eliza was moved again—this time to Sunderland, England, where her stepfather's older sister, Catherine Rae, set up a boarding school in Monkwearmouth with her husband. Eliza continued her education there. Her determination and temper became her trademarks. Her stay in Sunderland lasted only a year, as she was then transferred to a school in Camden Place (now Camden Crescent), Bath, for a more sophisticated education.

In 1837, 16-year-old Eliza eloped with Lieutenant Thomas James. The couple separated five years later, in Calcutta, India, and she became a professional dancer under a stage name.

When she had her London debut as "Lola Montez, the Spanish dancer" in June 1843, she was recognised as "Mrs. James". The resulting notoriety hampered her career in England, so she departed for the continent, where she had success in Paris and Warsaw. At this time, she was almost certainly accepting favours from a few wealthy men, and was regarded by many as a courtesan.

Coat of arms given to Montez when she was made Countess of Landsfeld by Ludwig I of Bavaria

=== Life as a courtesan ===
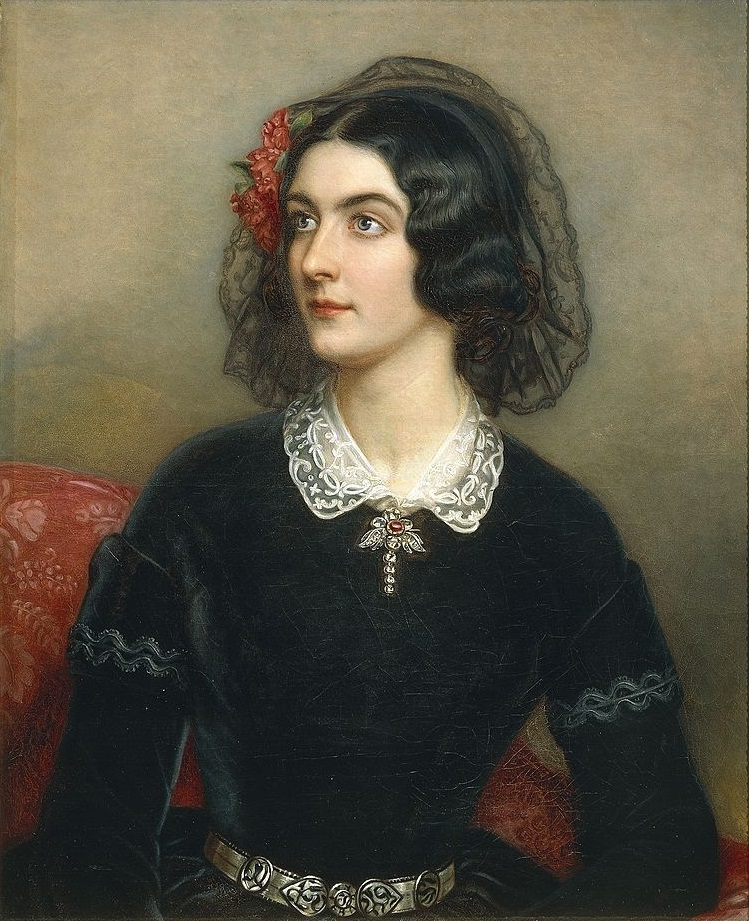
Portrait of Lola Montez (1847), painted by Joseph Karl Stieler for Ludwig I of Bavaria and his Schönheitengalerie

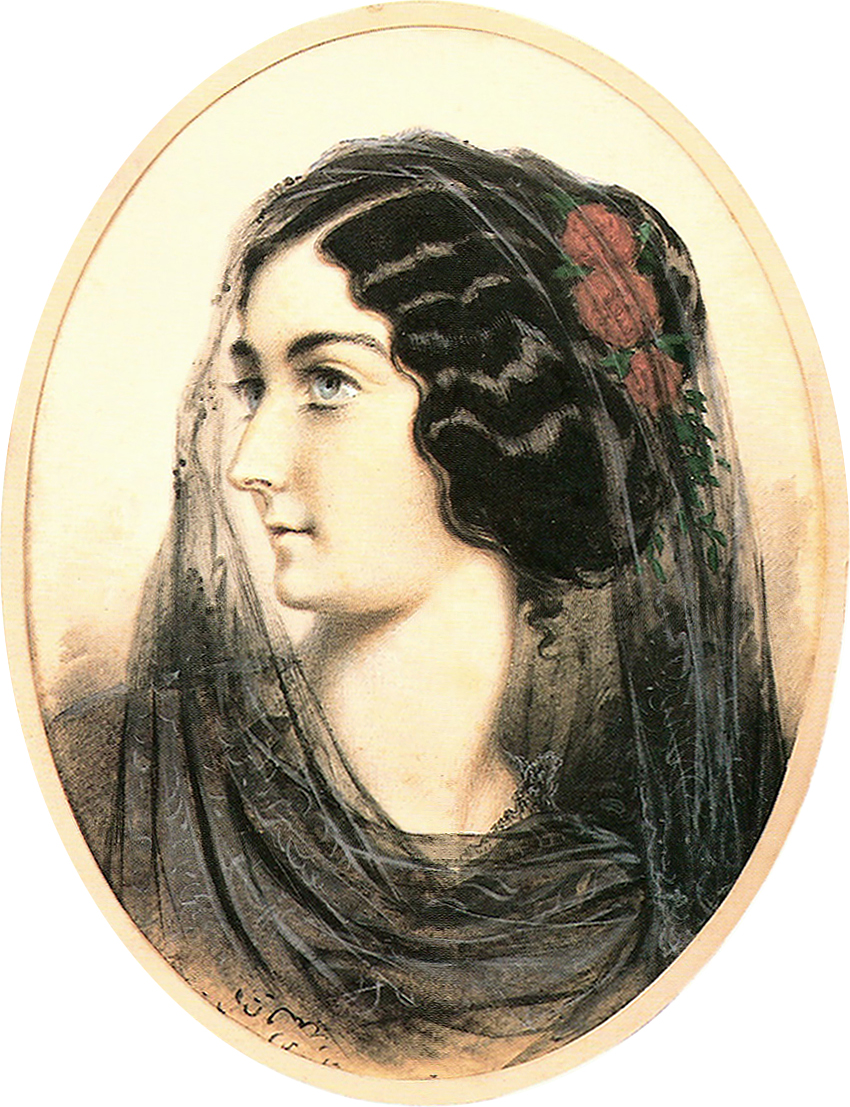
Lola Montez (Gouache by Carl Buchner, 1847)

In 1844, Eliza, now known as Lola Montez, made a personally disappointing Parisian stage debut as a dancer in Fromental Halévy's opera Le lazzarone. She met and had an affair with Franz Liszt, who introduced her to the circle of George Sand. After performing in various European capitals, she settled in Paris, where she was accepted into the city's literary bohemia, becoming acquainted with Alexandre Dumas, with whom she was also rumoured to have had a dalliance. In Paris she met Alexandre Dujarrier, "owner of the newspaper with the highest circulation in France, and also the newspaper's drama critic". Through their romance, Montez revitalised her career as a dancer. Later, after the two had their first quarrel over Montez's attendance at a party, Dujarrier attended the party and, in a drunken state, offended Jean-Baptiste Rosemond de Beauvallon. When Dujarrier was challenged to a duel by de Beauvallon, Dujarrier was shot and killed.

In 1846, Montez arrived in Munich, where she was discovered by and became the mistress of King Ludwig I of Bavaria. There was a rumour that when they first met, Ludwig asked her in public if her breasts were real. Her response to the question was to tear off enough of her garments to prove that they were. She soon began to use her influence on the king and this, coupled with her arrogant manner and outbursts of temper, made her extremely unpopular with the Bavarian people (particularly after documents were made public showing that she was hoping to become a naturalised Bavarian subject and be elevated to nobility). Despite opposition, Ludwig made her Countess of Landsfeld and Baroness of Rosenthal on his next birthday, 25 August 1847, and along with her title, he granted her a large annuity.

For more than a year, Montez exercised great political power, which she directed in favour of liberalism, anti-Catholicism, and in attacks against the Jesuits. Her ability to manipulate the king was so great that the Minister of State, Karl von Abel, was dismissed because he and his entire cabinet had objected to her being granted Bavarian nationality and the title of countess. The students at the Ludwig-Maximilians-Universität München were divided in their sympathies, and conflicts arose shortly before the outbreak of the revolutions of 1848, which led the king, at Montez's insistence, to close the university.

In March 1848, under pressure from a growing revolutionary movement, the university was reopened, Ludwig abdicated in favour of his son, King Maximilian II, and Montez fled Bavaria, ending her career as a power behind the throne. It seems likely that Ludwig's relationship with Montez contributed greatly to his forced abdication despite his previous popularity.

After a sojourn in Switzerland, where she waited in vain for Ludwig to join her, Montez made a brief excursion to France and then removed to London in late 1848. There she met and quickly married George Trafford Heald, a young army cornet (cavalry officer) with a recent inheritance. But the terms of her divorce from Thomas James did not permit either spouse's remarriage while the other was living, and the beleaguered newlyweds were forced to flee the country to escape a bigamy action brought by Heald's scandalised maiden aunt. The Healds resided for a time in France and Spain, but within two years the tempestuous relationship was in tatters. George survived a reported drowning in Lisbon in 1853, but died three years later from tuberculosis. Meanwhile, in 1851 Montez set off to make a new start in the United States, where she was surprisingly successful at first in rehabilitating her image.

=== American career ===
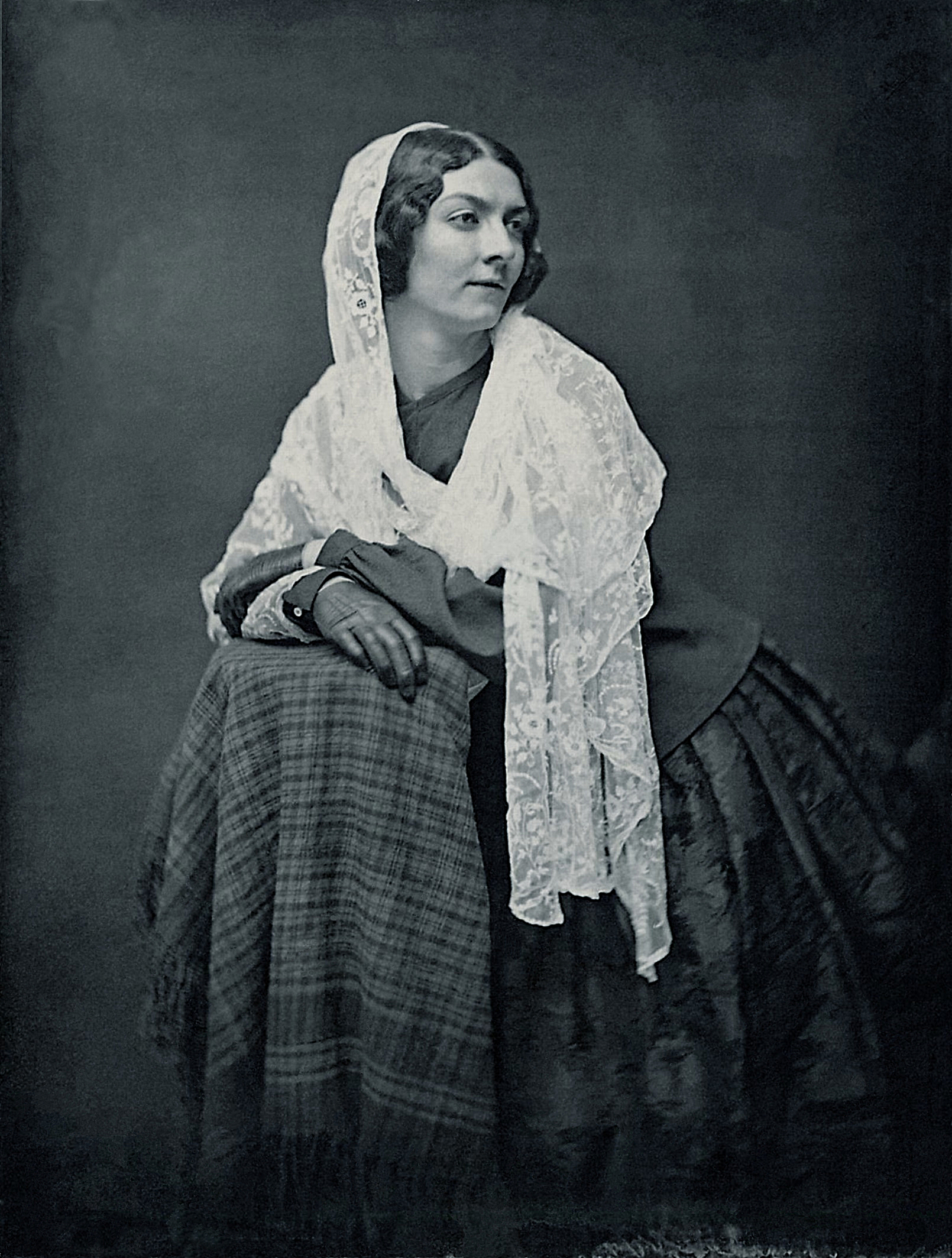
Lola Montez in 1851, daguerreotype by Southworth & Hawes

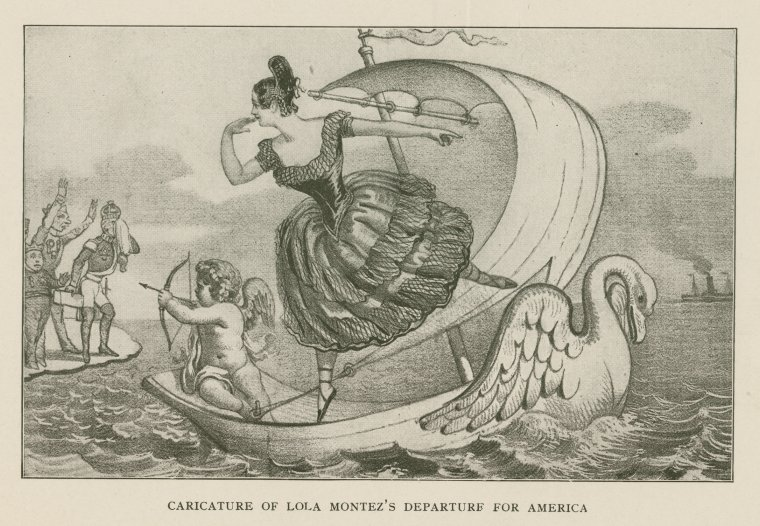
A caricature by David Claypoole Johnston from the period showing Lola Montez leaving Europe for the United States

From 1851 to 1853, Montez performed as a dancer and actress in the eastern United States, one of her offerings being a play called Lola Montez in Bavaria. In May 1853, she arrived in San Francisco, where her performances created a sensation and inspired a popular satire, Who's Got the Countess? She married Patrick Hull, a local newspaperman, in July and moved to Grass Valley, California, in August. Her marriage soon failed; a doctor named as co-respondent in the divorce suit brought against her was murdered shortly thereafter.

Montez remained in Grass Valley for nearly two years. Her restored residence is California Historical Landmark No. 292. She inspired another aspiring young entertainer, Lotta Crabtree, whose parents ran a boarding house in Grass Valley. Montez, a neighbour, provided dancing lessons and encouraged Lotta's enthusiasm for performance.

=== Australia tour ===
In June 1855, Montez left the U.S. to tour Australia and resume her career by entertaining miners at the gold diggings. She arrived in Sydney on 16 August 1855.

Historian Michael Cannon writes, "in September 1855 she performed her erotic Spider Dance at the Theatre Royal in Melbourne, raising her skirts so high that the audience could see she wore no underclothing at all. Next day, The Argus thundered that her performance was 'utterly subversive to all ideas of public morality'. Respectable families ceased to attend the theatre, which began to show heavy losses."

Montez earned further notoriety in Ballarat when, after reading a bad review of her performance in The Ballarat Times, she attacked the editor, Henry Seekamp, with a whip. Although the "Lola Montes Polka" (composed by Albert Denning) is rumoured to have been inspired by this event, the song was published in 1855 and the incident with Seekamp occurred in February 1856. At Castlemaine in April 1856, she was "rapturously encored" after her Spider Dance in front of 400 diggers (including members of the Municipal Council who had adjourned their meeting early to attend the performance), but drew the wrath of the audience after insulting them following some mild heckling.

She departed for San Francisco on 22 May 1856. On the return voyage her manager and purported lover was lost at sea after going overboard.

=== Later life in the U.S. ===
Montez failed in her attempts at a theatrical comeback in various U.S. cities, but found a new profession as a lecturer, appearing in the U.S., Britain, and Ireland and speaking on a variety of topics, including "The Comic Aspects of Love" and "Wits and Women of Paris". In 1857, she arranged to deliver a series of moral lectures in Britain and America written by Charles Chauncey Burr. She also found some success as a writer, beginning with the publication of her letters, which were well-received enough for her to write and publish The Arts of Beauty, or Secrets of a Lady's Toilet, with Hints to Gentlemen on the Art of Fascinating. She spent her last days in rescue work among women, which included working with women who had been prostitutes but were trying to leave the profession. In November 1859, The Philadelphia Press reported that Montez was:

living very quietly up town, and doesn't have much to do with the world's people. Some of her old friends, the Bohemians, now and then drop in to have a little chat with her, and though she talks beautifully of her present feelings and way of life, she generally, by way of parenthesis, takes out her little tobacco pouch and makes a cigarette or two for self and friend, and then falls back upon old times with decided gusto and effect. But she doesn't tell anybody what she's going to do.

=== Burial ===
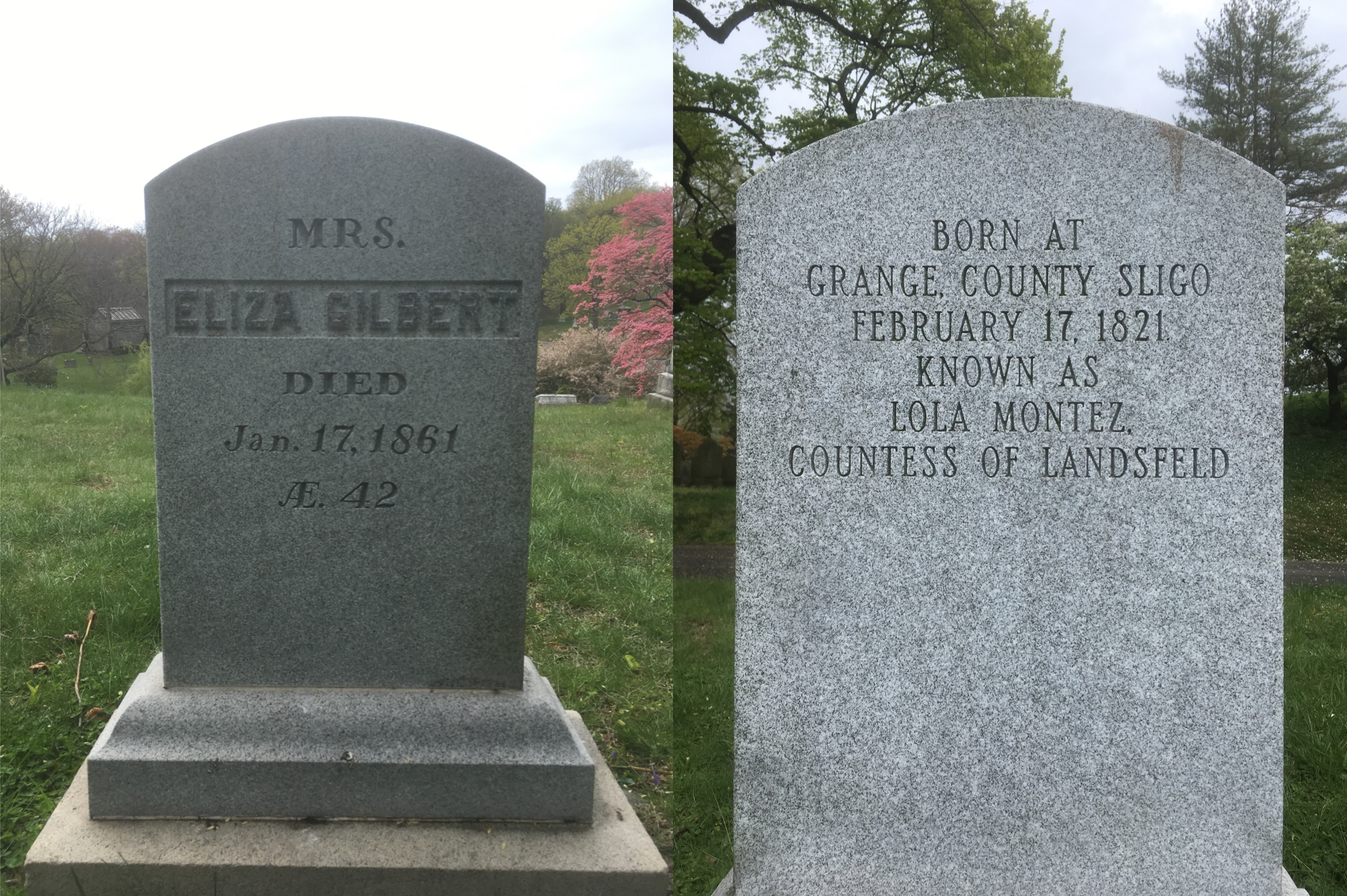
Lola Montez's grave in Green-Wood Cemetery, Brooklyn, New York

Reports of Montez's death vary, with contradictions among sources about both the cause and the year of her death. One source claims that by 1860, Montez was showing tertiary effects of syphilis and her body had begun to waste away. Another says she died of syphilis at age 39 on 17 January 1861. A third source says Montez died of pneumonia at the age of 40. Montez is buried in Green-Wood Cemetery in Brooklyn, New York, where her tombstone erroneously lists her age at death as 42, reading "Mrs. Eliza Gilbert | Died 17 January 1861 | Æ. 42".

== In popular culture ==
=== Fiction ===
- Several writers have mentioned Montez as a possible source of inspiration for the character Irene Adler in Arthur Conan Doyle's Sherlock Holmes story "A Scandal in Bohemia".
- Montez's time in Bavaria is the subject of Miloš Crnjanski's 1932 novel A Drop of Spanish Blood.
- Philip Van Doren Stern's novel Lola: A Love Story (1949) is based on her life.
- Edison Marshall's novel The Infinite Woman (1950) is based on her life.
- In one of J. B. Priestley's last fictional works, The Pavilion of Masks, she is the basis of the character Cleo Torres, Spanish dancer and mistress of a German prince.
- Montez allegedly inspired Jennifer Wilde's historical romance novel Dare To Love (1978), whose protagonist Elena Lopez is also a British woman passing herself off as a Spanish exotic dancer. Elena has an affair with Franz Liszt, becomes friends with George Sand and has a friendship with the king of a small Germanic country obviously based on Ludwig I of Bavaria, then moves to California.
- Montez appears in Royal Flash by George MacDonald Fraser, where she has a brief affair with Sir Harry Flashman.
- Montez is described in Daughter of Fortune (original Spanish title Hija de la fortuna) and Portrait in Sepia (original Spanish title Retrato en Sepia) by Isabel Allende.

=== Film and television ===
- Montez's life was first portrayed in the 1919 biopic Lola Montez by Leopoldine Konstantin.
- Montez's life is portrayed in the 1922 German film Lola Montez, the King's Dancer. She is played by Ellen Richter.
- Fox made a 1926 silent film of her life, The Palace of Pleasure, directed by Emmett J. Flynn. Lola was played by Betty Compson. The film is now considered lost.
- Montez is portrayed by Sheila Darcy in the film Wells Fargo (1937).
- Montez was the last role played by Conchita Montenegro, in the biographical film Lola Montes (1944), with a moralising script, directed by Antonio Román.
- A character named Lola Montez features in the 1948 film Black Bart, played by Yvonne De Carlo. This was after the success of her breakthrough portrayal of the titular Salome, Where She Danced (1945), which was loosely based on Montez's life story.
- Montez was portrayed by Carmen D'Antonio in the film Golden Girl (1951).
- Montez was portrayed by Martine Carol in the biographical film Lola Montès (1955), based on the novel La Vie Extraordinaire de Lola Montès by Cecil Saint-Laurent, directed by Max Ophüls and co-starring Peter Ustinov, Anton Walbrook, and Oskar Werner.
- The actress Paula Morgan played Montez in the 1955 episode "Lola Montez" of the syndicated television anthology series Death Valley Days, hosted by Stanley Andrews.
- Montez is the title character in season 2, episode 23 of Tales of Wells Fargo, "Lola Montez", played by Rita Moreno, first broadcast in 1959.
- Montez is a character in the film Royal Flash (1975), based on the book of the same name by George MacDonald Fraser. She is played by Florinda Bolkan.
- Montez is a character in the film Lisztomania (1975). She is played by Anulka Dziubinska.
- Montez is played by Irish singer Camille O'Sullivan in the 2005 historical documentary Her Name was Lola, directed by Anne Roper for RTÉ's Hidden History series.

=== Stage and music ===
- Montez influenced the character of Lola in the 1955 musical play Damn Yankees, featuring her own titular number "Whatever Lola Wants". The role was originated by Gwen Verdon, who reprised the role in the 1958 film version.
- Montez's time in the Australian goldfields was the subject of the musical Lola Montez staged in Melbourne, Brisbane, and Sydney in 1958 starring Mary Preston. A recording of the musical was released on LP in 1958.
- Trestle Theatre Company created a 2008 production titled Lola about the life of Montez.
- Musician Joanna Newsom's title track on the 2010 album Have One on Me is about Montez.
- Danish metal band Volbeat's song "Lola Montez" is on its 2013 album Outlaw Gentlemen & Shady Ladies. The lyrics reference Montez's spider dance and the incident with Henry Seekamp.
- Lola Montez appears as a non-singing character in John Adams's opera Girls of the Golden West, performing the Spider Dance for miners in a California gold rush mining camp. In the 2017 San Francisco premiere, the role was played by Lorena Feijóo.
- The song Lola Montez Danced The Spider Dance appears on Cass McCombs's 2025 album Interior Live Oak.

=== Historical account ===
- Montez is mentioned in passing in Henry James' autobiographical A Small Boy and Others. He recalls seeing a poster of her "of a dazzling and unreal beauty and in a riding-habit lavishly open at the throat."
- Montez appears briefly in Mary Seacole's autobiographical The Wonderful Adventures of Mrs. Seacole in Many Lands.

=== Places ===
- Two lakes (an upper and lower) named after Montez are in the Tahoe National Forest in Nevada County, California.
- Mount Lola, Nevada County, California is named in her honour.

== Works ==
- Montez, Lola (1858). The Arts of Beauty . New York: Dick & Fitzgerald – via Wikisource.
- Montez, Lola; Burr, Charles Chauncey (1858). Lectures of Lola Montez . New York: Rudd & Carleton – via Wikisource.
- Bunbury, Turtle. (2016). '1847 – A Chronicle of Genius, Generosity & Savagery. Gill Books. ISBN 9780717168347.
