= Day Book =

Day Book may refer to:

- The Day Book, a newspaper in Chicago 1911–1917
- Weekly Day Book, a newspaper which primarily existed to propagate white supremacist ideas, 1848–1879
- General journal, or day book
  - a day book in bookkeeping

== See also ==
- Diary, a record reporting on what has happened over the course of a day
- Commonplace book, a way to compile knowledge, usually by writing information into books
