= Slavery during the American Civil War =

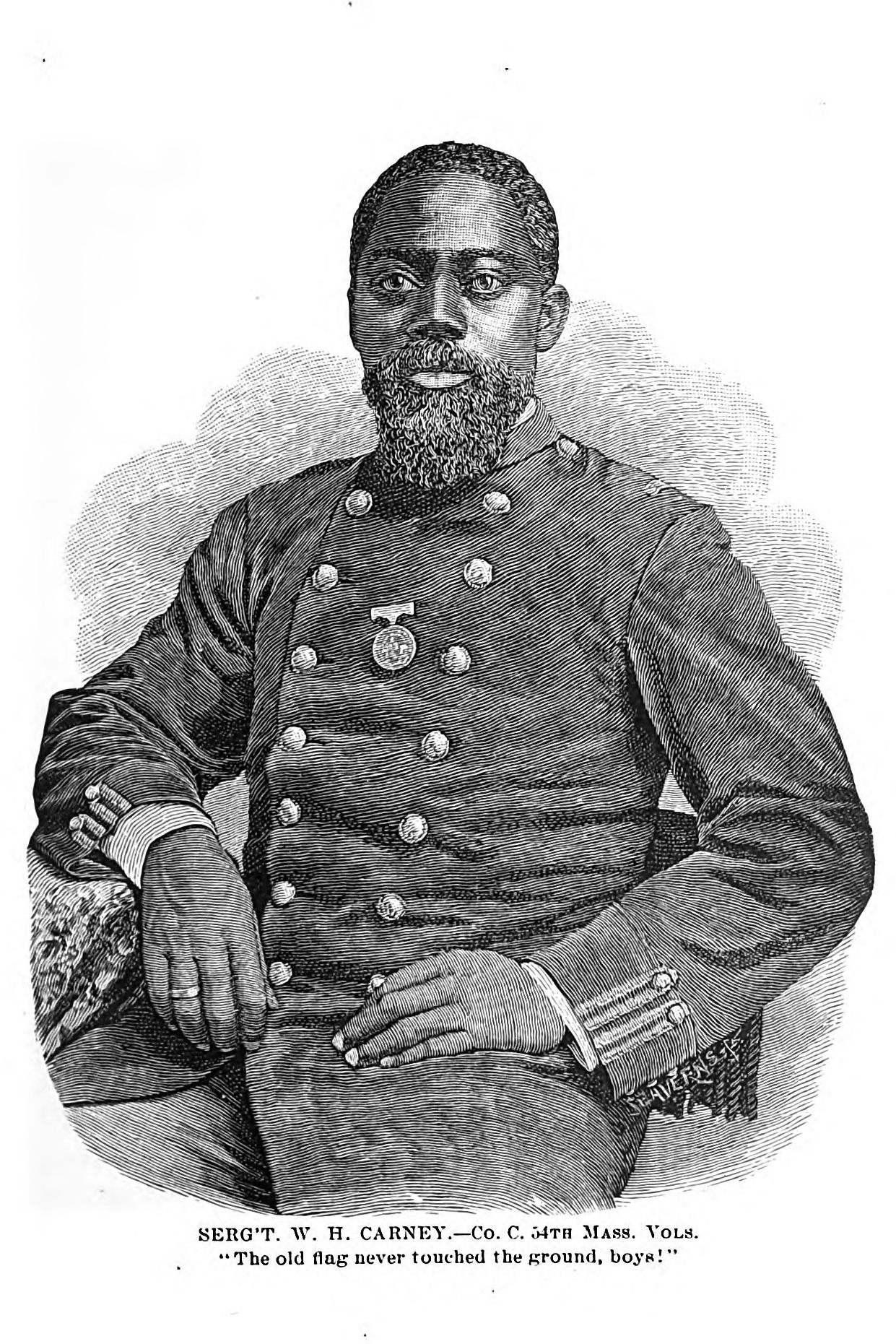
Sgt. William Harvey Carney, born a slave in Norfolk, Virginia, was awarded the Medal of Honor in 1900 for his actions at the Battle of Fort Wagner in 1863 (The Black Phalanx, 1888)

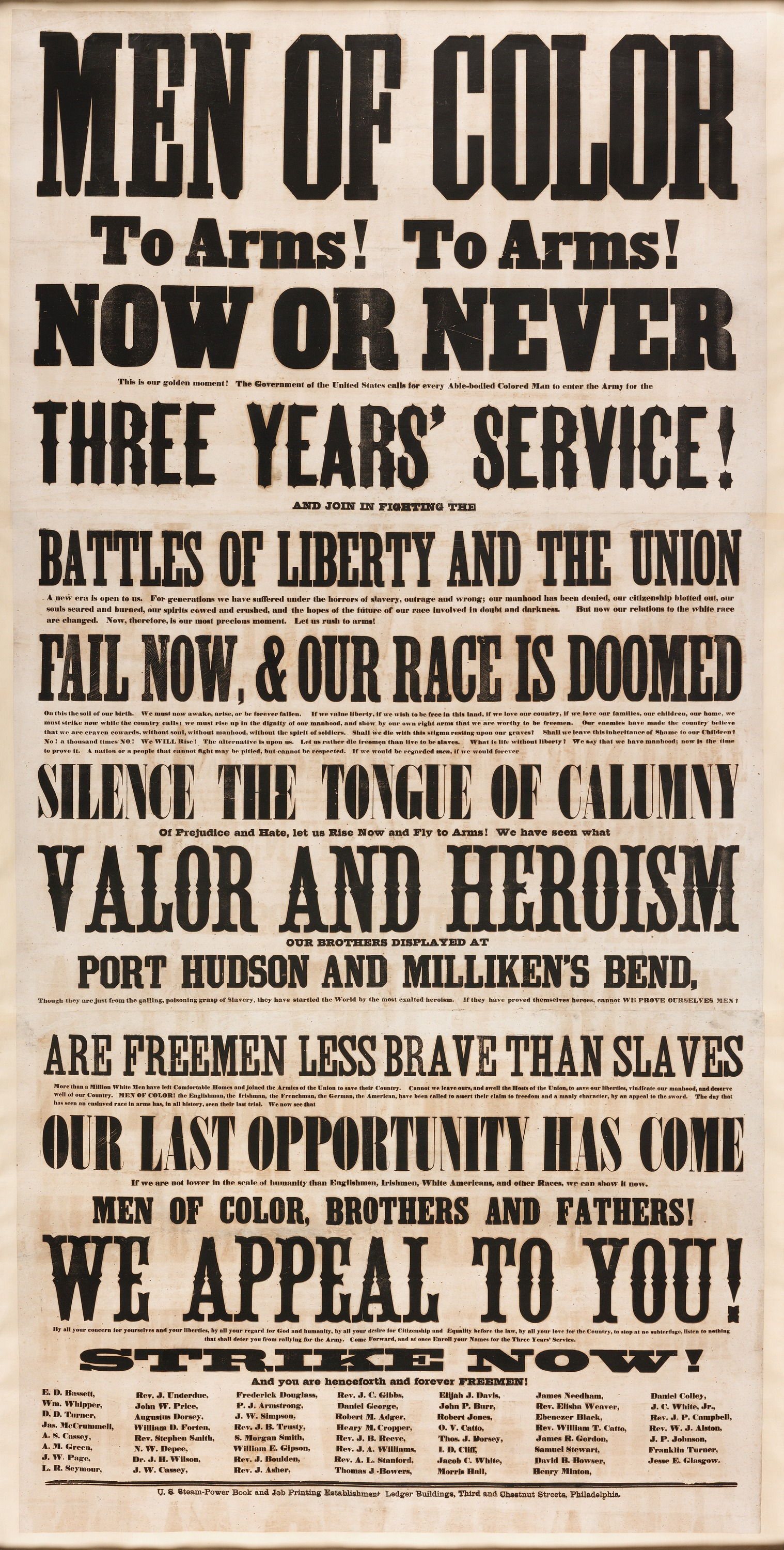
"MEN OF COLOR To Arms! To Arms!" recruitment broadside written by Frederick Douglass (NMAAHC-2012 133 001)

Slavery played the central role during the American Civil War. The primary catalyst for secession was slavery, especially Southern political leaders' resistance to attempts by Northern antislavery political forces to block the expansion of slavery into the western territories. Slave life went through great changes, as the Southern United States saw Union Armies take control of broad areas of land. During and before the war, enslaved people played an active role in their own emancipation, and thousands of enslaved people escaped from bondage during the war.

== Demographics and economics ==
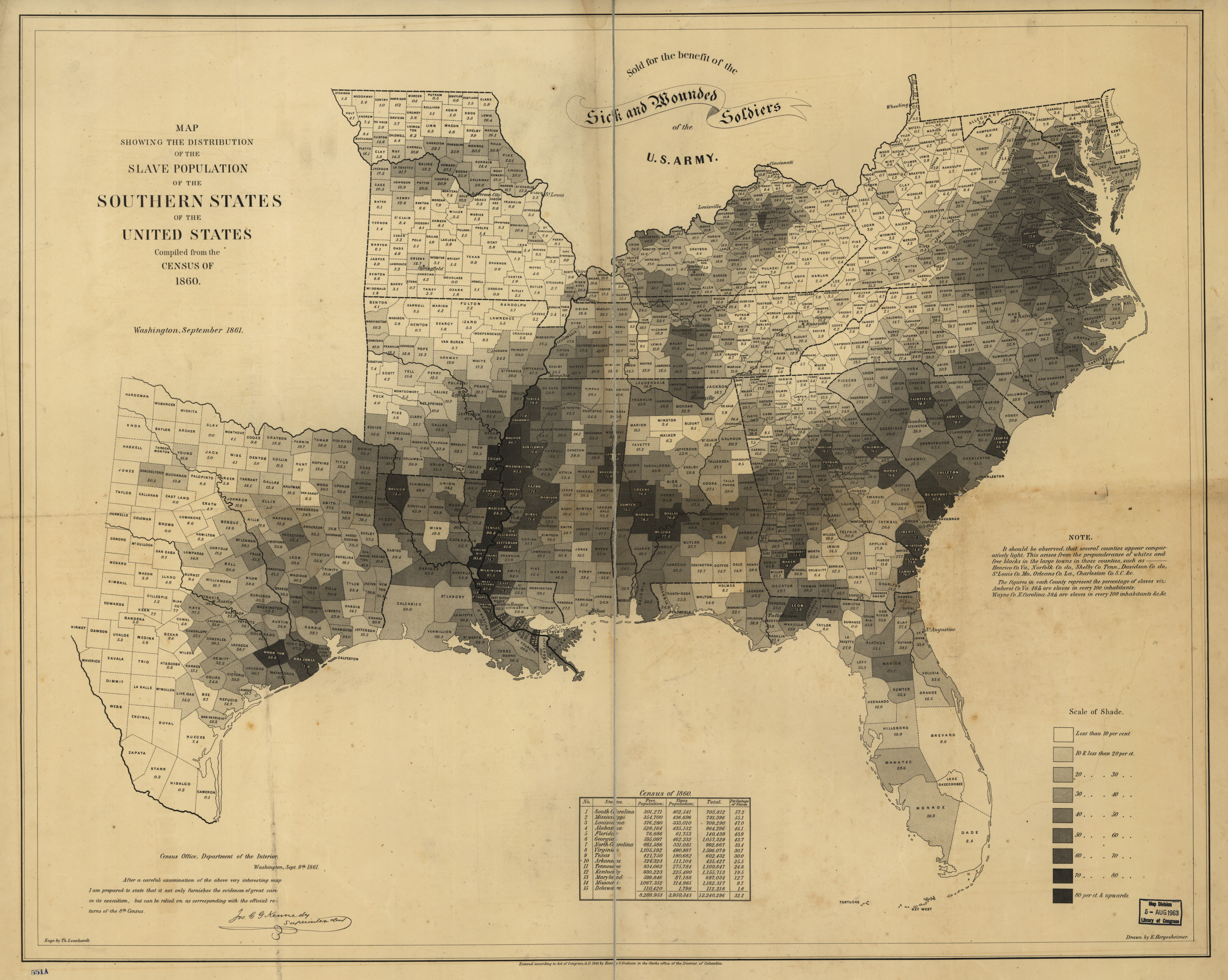
Percentage of slaves in each county of the slave states in 1860

There have been many different ways to estimate the amount of slaveholding in the South. In 1860, 1.6% of US citizens owned slaves. However, since slaveholders were often heads of households, many more people benefited from the system even if they did not own slaves themselves.

Most of the South's enslaved workers were enslaved by planters (often defined as those who enslaved twenty or more people), although yeomen farmers outnumbered the fewer than 50,000 planters. Southern agriculture was more lucrative than Northern, focusing on crops of rice, cotton, and sugar. Even before the war, in the rice regions of Georgia and South Carolina and in parts of the Mississippi Delta there were ten or even twenty enslaved black people for every white person. During the war, this disparity grew, leading to fear of insurrection and calls for militia companies to be stationed in agricultural regions to guarantee peace.

The market for buying and selling enslaved people continued during the war, as did the market for hiring and hiring out enslaved labor. Although the price of enslaved workers grew, it did not keep up with inflation, causing the real price of enslaved people to decline during the Civil War. The prices of people held in slavery rose and fell in part with the prospects for Confederate victory. In 1860, the average enslaved person sold in Virginia brought $1,500, and a "prime field hand" in New Orleans brought $1,800. In 1863, enslaved people in Richmond sold for $4,000 or $5,000 and in Texas for $2,500 to $3,500, depending on skill sets. Before the start of the war, the expansion of slavery was an important political and economic goal for slaveholders. This continued during the war, and there was a large expansion of slavery into Texas, which had been made a state in 1845. However, late in the war, many slave owners recognized the increasing probability that slavery would be ended, and there is evidence that they increased their attempts to sell the people they held in slavery.

== Culture ==
=== African American cultural shifts ===
Opportunities for cultural expression grew as autonomy for slaves increased during the war. Christianity grew among enslaved people and freedmen during and immediately after the civil war. Organizations such as the American Missionary Association and National Freedman's Relief Association sent missionaries into Union-occupied areas where they formed religious congregations and led revivals. The African Methodist Episcopal Church (AME) in particular established a large presence among enslaved people and freedmen in and around Union held areas. Along with civilian missionaries, the AME also provided chaplains for black Union regiments. Among the free blacks AME figures especially active in the South during the war were James Walker Hood, Henry McNeal Turner, Jabez Pitt Campbell, John M. Brown and William E. Matthews.

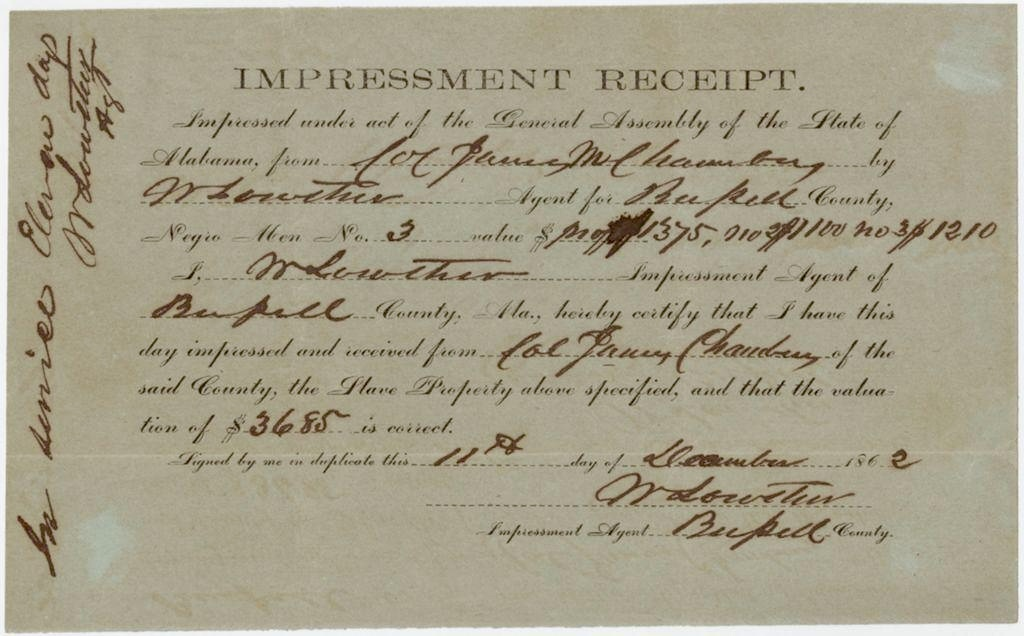
Slave impressment receipt for three slaves who worked for 11 days in Russell County, Alabama in 1862 Gail and Stephen Rudin Slavery Collection, Cornell University Libraries)

Music sung by African-Americans changed during the war. The theme of escape from bondage became especially important in spirituals sung by blacks, both by enslaved people singing among themselves on plantations and for free and recently freed blacks singing to white audiences. New versions of songs such as "Hail Mary", "Michael Row the Boat Ashore", and "Go Down Moses" emphasized the message of freedom and the rejection of slavery. Many new slave songs were sung as well, the most popular being, "Many Thousands Go", which was frequently sung by enslaved people fleeing plantations to Union Army camps. Several attempts were made to publish slave songs during the war. The first was the publishing of sheet music to "Go Down Moses" by Reverend L. C. Lockwood in December 1861 based on his experience with escaped slaves in Fort Monroe, Virginia in September of that year. In 1863, the Continental Monthly published a sampling of spirituals from South Carolina in an article titled, "Under the Palmetto."

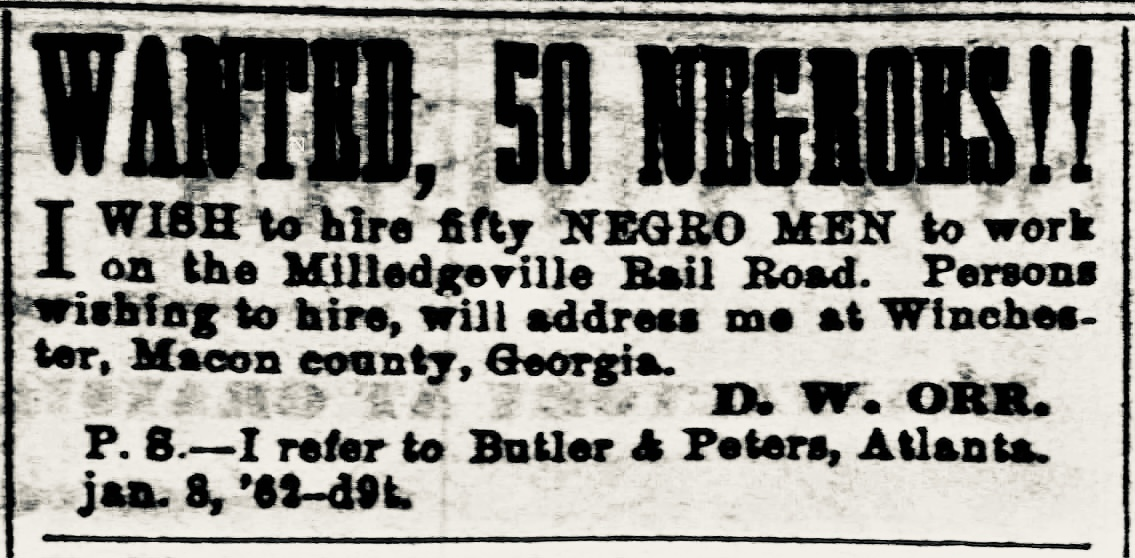
The South's enslaved labor force was vital for building and maintaining critical infrastructure such as railroads, labor that became increasingly difficult to source as the war continued ("WANTED, 50 NEGROES!!" Southern Confederacy, Atlanta, Jan. 9, 1862)

The white Colonel of the all-black First South Carolina, Thomas Wentworth Higginson noted that when blacks knew that whites were listening, they changed the way they were sung, and historian Christian McWhirter noted that African Americans "used their music to reshape white perceptions and foster a new image of black culture as thriving and ready for freedom. In Port Royal, escaped slaves learned the anthem, "America" in secret, never singing it in front of whites. When the Emancipation Proclamation was passed a celebration was held, and in a surprise to white onlookers, contrabands began singing the anthem, using the song to express their new status. The most popular white songs among slaves were "John Brown's Body" and H. C. Work's "Kingdom Coming", and as the war continued, the lyrics African Americans sung changed, with vagueness and coded language dropped and including open expressions of their new roles as soldiers and citizens.

Slave owners in the south responded by restricting singing on plantations and imprisoning singers of songs supporting emancipation or the North. Confederate supporters also looked to music sung by enslaved people for signs of loyalty. Several Confederate regimental bands included enslaved musicians, and Confederates arranged enslaved people to sing and dance to show how happy they were. Enslaved performer Thomas Greene Bethune, known as Blind Tom, frequently played pro-Confederate songs such as "Maryland, My Maryland" and "Dixie" during this period and dropped, "Yankee Doodle" from his performances.

=== Attitudes of whites ===
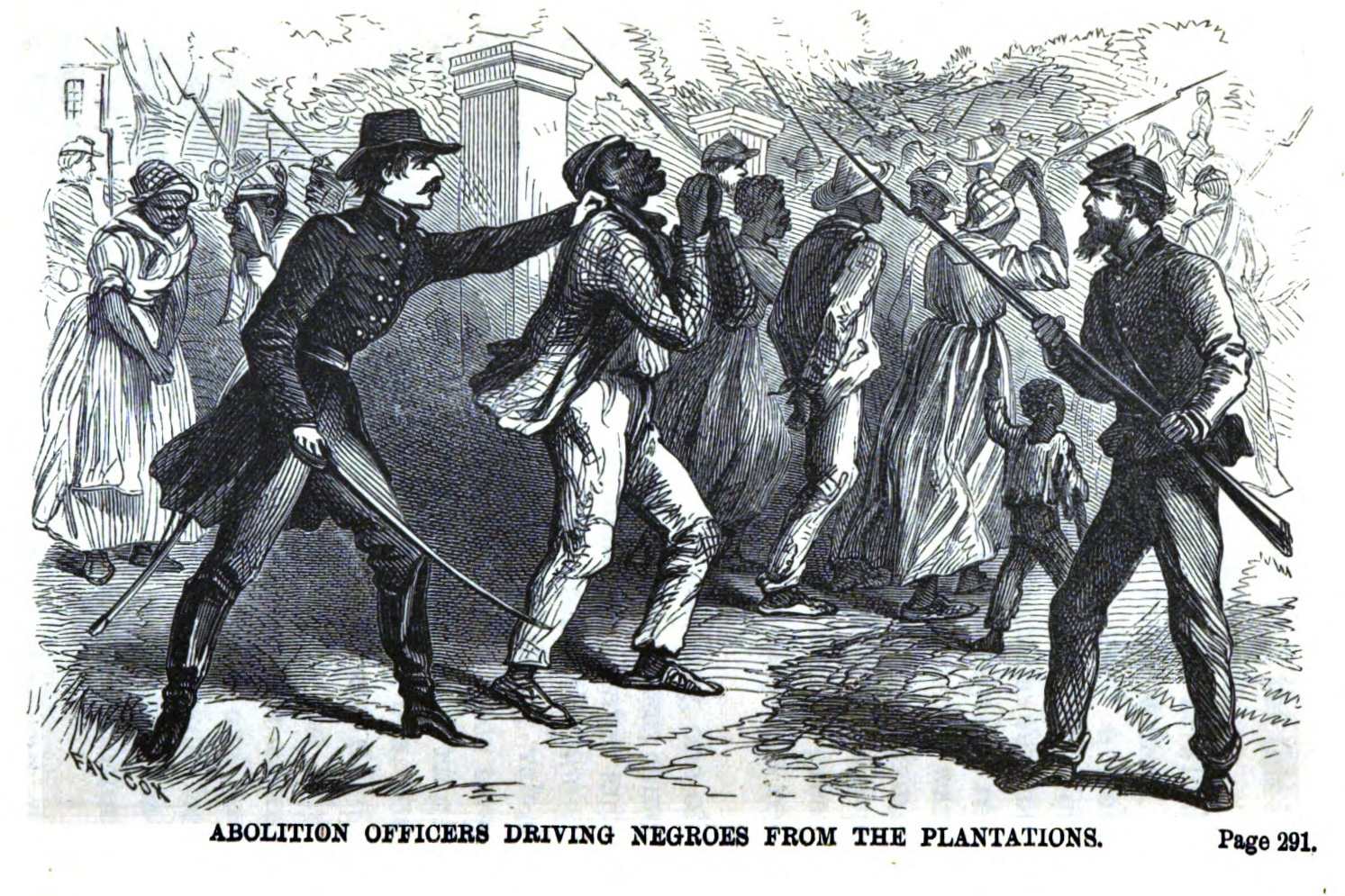
Illustration from R. G. Horton's pro-Confederate, pro-slavery "history" of the war for children, which "sought to forestall acceptance of an Emancipationist understanding of the war's meaning, replacing it with a vile and unrepentant assertion of white supremacy."

Feelings of whites about slavery during this period has also been the subject of study. Generally, poor, non-slaveholding whites in the south admired planters and sought to own slaves themselves. During the war, Confederate soldiers were optimistic about the prospects for the survival of the Confederacy and the institution of slavery well into 1864. Confederates feared the Emancipation Proclamation would lead to slave uprisings, an occurrence which even northerners did not desire. Although most people at that time had not been born at the time of the Nat Turner Revolt or the revolution in Haiti, insurrections were greatly feared. Also, the north was not united against slavery, and many Union troops desired that the United States, win or lose, be a white man's country. However, it was clear to all that Lincoln's party, the Republican Party, was in favor of eventual if not immediate emancipation.

While most historians agree that the war erupted over a debate about slavery, the role of slavery in the motivation of soldiers had been the subject of widespread debate. J. Tracy Power in Lee's Miserables and Stephen Berry in All That Makes a Man argued that Confederate soldiers did not think much about slavery. Others such as Chandra Manning in What This Cruel War Was Over, Jason Phillips in Diehard Rebels, Joseph Glatthaar in The New Civil War History and General Lee's Army, Aaron Sheehan-Deen in Why Confederates Fought, Kenneth Noe in Reluctant Rebels, and James McPherson in For Cause and Comrades argued that slavery was central in the mindset of many Confederate soldiers. The issue in the mind and motivation of Union soldiers has also been debated. Manning's What This Cruel War Was Over is an example discussing the importance of slavery for Union soldiers.

== Disaffection ==
Slave uprisings were a constant fear of slaveholders before and during the war. A slave insurrection was planned in Adams County, Mississippi, which was uncovered in the summer of 1861 leading to widespread punishment of enslaved people in the area. In June 1861, an aborted insurrection occurred in St. Martin's Parish, Louisiana, which resulted in the arrest of forty enslaved black people and the arrest of two white men who led the uprising, one of who was arrested and the other who escaped. In August 1861, a possible uprising in Jefferson County, Alabama involving possibly 400 enslaved people was put down. Slaveholders in mountainous country particular feared uprising as the terrain made it harder for them to monitor the people they enslaved.

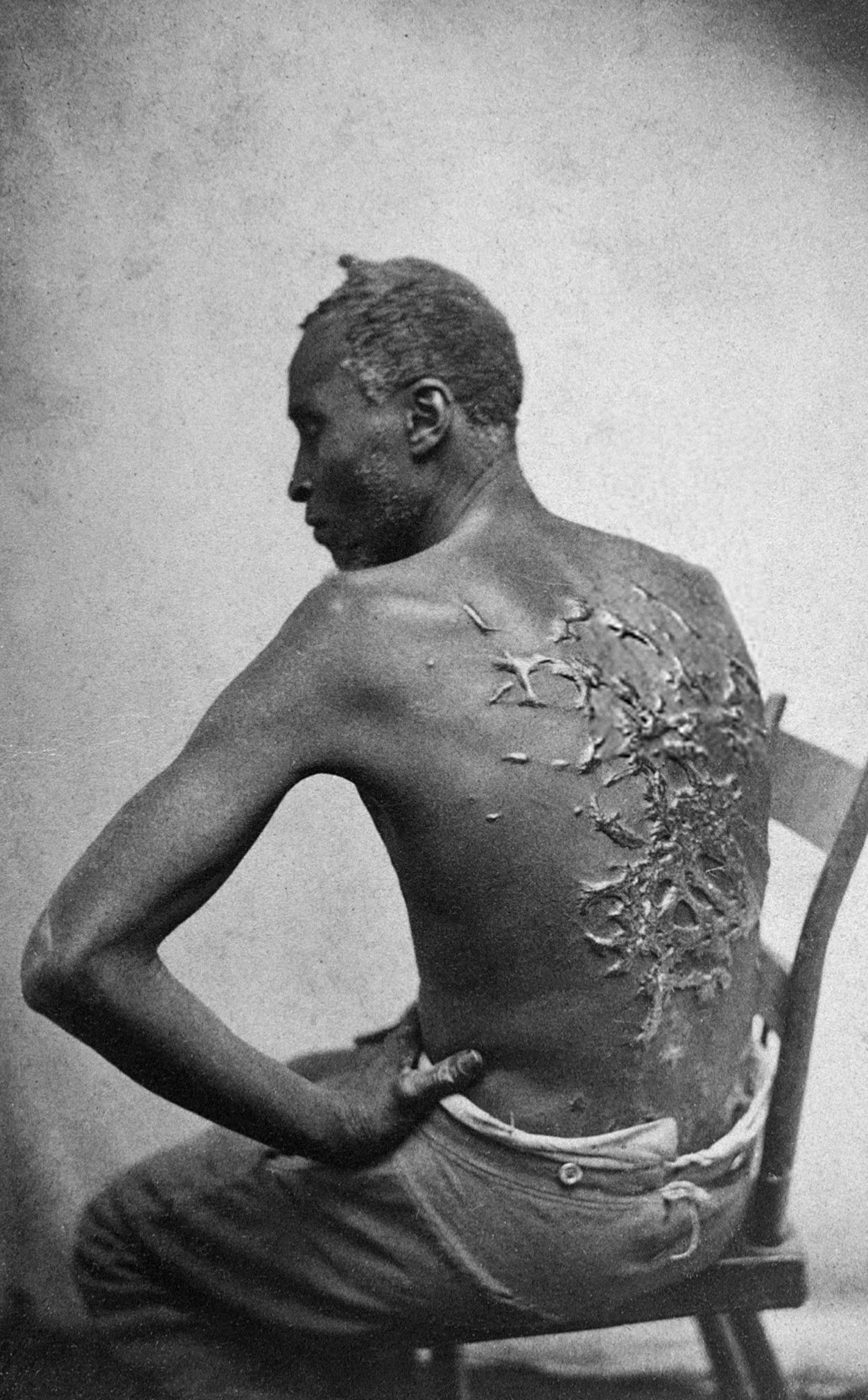
Peter or Gordon, a whipped slave, photo taken at Baton Rouge, Louisiana, 1863; the guilty overseer was fired.

Physical punishment had a prominent place in slave society and this extended to enslaved people in the Confederate Army, who were frequently whipped or punished in other ways. Punishments sometimes extended to include maiming, murder, rape, and the selling of loved ones, the last of these being often considered one of the most severe punishments.

=== Resistance ===
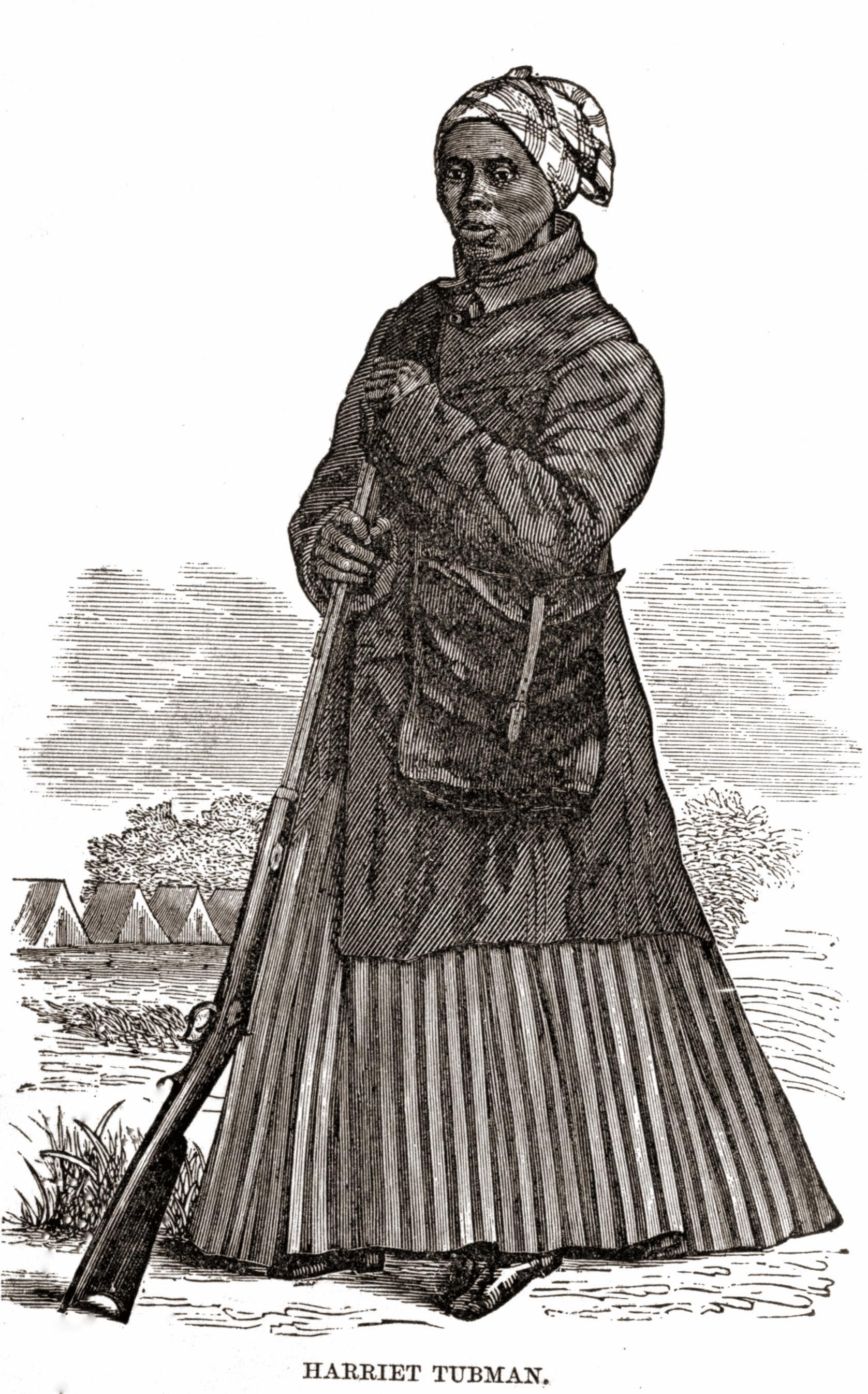
A woodcut of Harriet Tubman in her Civil War clothing

The resistance of enslaved people was widespread during and before the Civil War. One important outcome of that resistance was the effect it had on Southern troop morale as it undermined the belief that black people were more loyal to the Confederacy than the Union. Generally, African Americans cheered for Union victory and the Confederacy made a great effort to keep enslaved people under their control. After the war, Confederate veterans downplayed this resistance and professed to believe most of the people who they had enslaved were loyal at heart. In reality, resistance among enslaved people was common and widespread. On farms and plantations, enslaved workers broke equipment, feigned illness, slowed or stopped work, stole, plotted revolts, and fled. White's and blacks mobilized to help people escaping enslavement, following what was known as the Underground Railroad, and cementing the fame of individuals such as Harriet Tubman. Slave-owners were greatly disconcerted by the desire of the enslaved people they held captive to flee to Union armies, many genuinely believed enslaved people were tied by deep feelings and blamed abolitionist propaganda and the ignorance of enslaved people of the costs of freedom for their desire for freedom. Slaves also recognized that freedom by the sword may not be permanent and preferred to bide their time until an opportunity for freedom was assured, while others feared the uncertainty of a change in their current situation. However, most slaves chose freedom when the opportunity allowed. Where possible, many slave owners fled advancing Union armies and brought their slaves with them. In situations such as along the Atlantic coast and Mississippi river where Union advance was very fast and, such arrangements were not made, fleeing slave owners left their slaves behind, and many slaves escaped to the Union. Fleeing slave-owners from Louisiana and Mississippi often moved to Texas and the roads to Texas were said to be crowded by planters fleeing with their slaves.

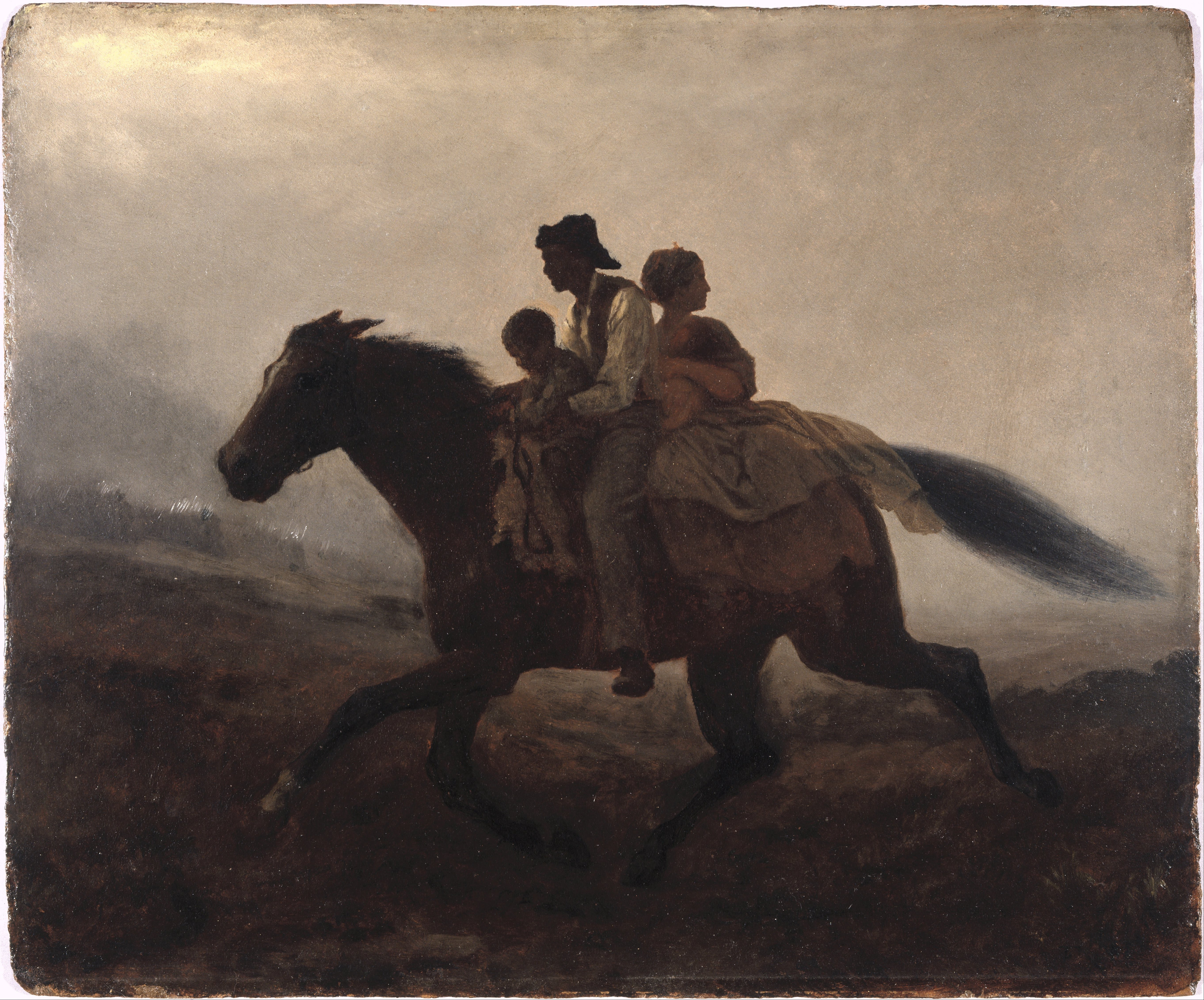
Eastman Johnson (American, 1824–1906). A Ride for Liberty -- The Fugitive Slaves (recto), ca. 1862. Oil on paperboard. Brooklyn Museum

Estimates of the number of runaways during the war vary. Secretary of War William Seward estimated that the Union Army seized about 200,000 slaves, while historians of estimated figures from 500,000 to 1,000,000. Slaves often disguised their feelings from their masters, wishing to appear loyal but watching and waiting for a chance to at freedom. Some slaves were willing to risk their lives and families, while others were not. Many and perhaps most slaves were governable during the war, especially in the early years. Escaping slaves who were caught on their way to freedom were usually very harshly dealt with and frequently executed.

Confederates emphasized negative aspects of the transition from slavery to freedom in discussions with their slaves and in letters and conversations during the period. Letters from captured Confederate soldiers noted the poor housing conditions and dress of freedmen they saw in Union held cities. Indeed, disease and lack of medical care were major issues in Federal camps set up for the freedmen, and some former slaves were sent to local planters where conditions were better. In Federal hands, there were cases of rape and other brutalities, and there were social and labor issues among the freedpeople. For instance, looking for work, in some cases, female slaves turned to prostitution.

In spite of evidence of the desire of slaves to be free, the "loyal slave" fixed itself in the consciousness of many white southerners during and after the war. This image had some grounding in fact, and examples of a personal bond, sense of duty, or other calculations leading slaves to remain loyal exist. There are also examples of slaves who served as masters serving in the Confederate Army, protecting women and children from assault by federal troops, or assisting aging or wounded masters when escape was possible.

After the beginning of the Civil War and after several battles had been fought and lost by the Union forces, and the hopes of the Union men had been sorely tried, Estin suddenly appeared with a pack on his back and an old shot-gun on his shoulder before his master. Mr. Broadness was greatly astonished, and said, "Estin, what are you going to do?" He replied, "Marse Jeems, I'm gwine to jine the army, for this war is not being carried on to suit me." And he did.

— David P. Dyer, 1922

== Military intelligence ==
Former slaves were a valuable source of intelligence for the U.S. military during the war. As one history of Louisiana during the war put it, "The slave did not ordinarily warn of major troop movements, reveal strategic plans, or otherwise influence command decisions. On the other hand, he could be depended upon to tell, if he knew, where the nearest Confederate soldiers were, when a retreating force had passed down the road, and where goods subject to legal confiscation or illegal liberation were to be found." It was a former slave who advised U.S. Grant to use the excellent boat landing at Bruinsburg to debark his army in advance of what became the siege of Vicksburg. Similarly, two of the four separate people who informed U.S. cavalry officers that John Hunt Morgan was sleeping over in Greeneville, Tennessee—information that led to Morgan's being shot in the neck by a private—were black.

== Enslaved laborers in the Confederate service ==
The Confederacy's early military successes depended significantly on slavery. Slaves provided agricultural and industrial labor, constructed fortifications, repaired railroads, and freed up white men to serve as soldiers. Tens of thousands of slaves were used to build and repair fortifications and railroads, as haule, teamsters, ditch diggers, and assisting medical workers. In their role, slaves in the army were heavily relied on and in some cases overworked to the point of illness or death. In January 1861, an enslaved laborer told a reporter in South Carolina that he'd been sent to Sullivan's Island with other workers from his plantation on the Santee River to work on Fort Moultrie and "to fight...de dam Yankees, sah, and the Ambumlishnists."

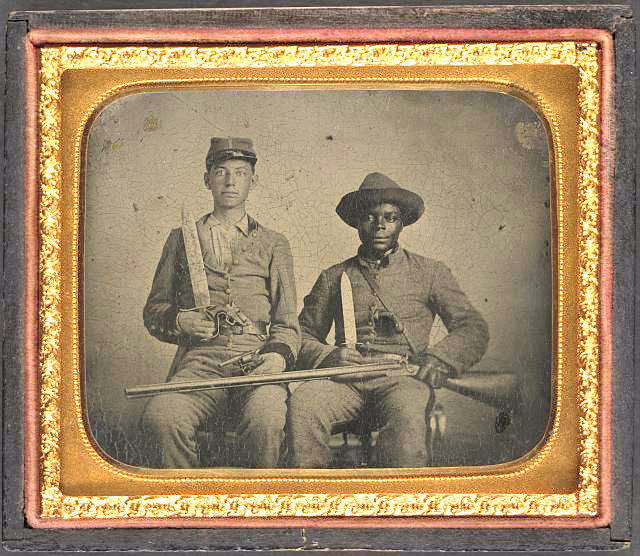
Sergeant A.M. Chandler of the 44th Mississippi Infantry Regiment, Co. F., and Silas Chandler, family slave

Another role slaves played during the war was camp servants. This role was more common in large, encamped armies than among home guards or guerilla units. Camp servants served their master and not the government and served officers and enlisted soldiers. Most Confederates could not, of course, afford this luxury, but they were not rare. In cases where camp servants were not enslaved, servants could receive a significant salary. It was also not uncommon for slaves to be paid or to keep a portion of the earnings derived from their labor. In one case, a soldier reported a slave receiving $4 for a week's washing and cooking, and in another servant, labor was reported to receive payments in excess of a private's pre-1864 monthly pay of $11.

Confederates frequently wrote about the care slaves had for their dying or deceased masters. This care represented the benign relationship between slaves and masters in the minds of Confederates. Historians have questioned whether the care taken represented affection or was due to anxiety about the fate of the slaves themselves after the death of their masters. On the other hand, physical punishment had a prominent place in slave society and this extended to slaves in the Confederate Army, who were frequently whipped or punished in other ways. Slaves were occasionally rewarded for good behavior, but there was a belief that punishment was a more effective means of maintaining control. Punishments sometimes extended to include maiming, murder, rape, and the selling of loved ones, the last of these being often considered the most severe punishment.

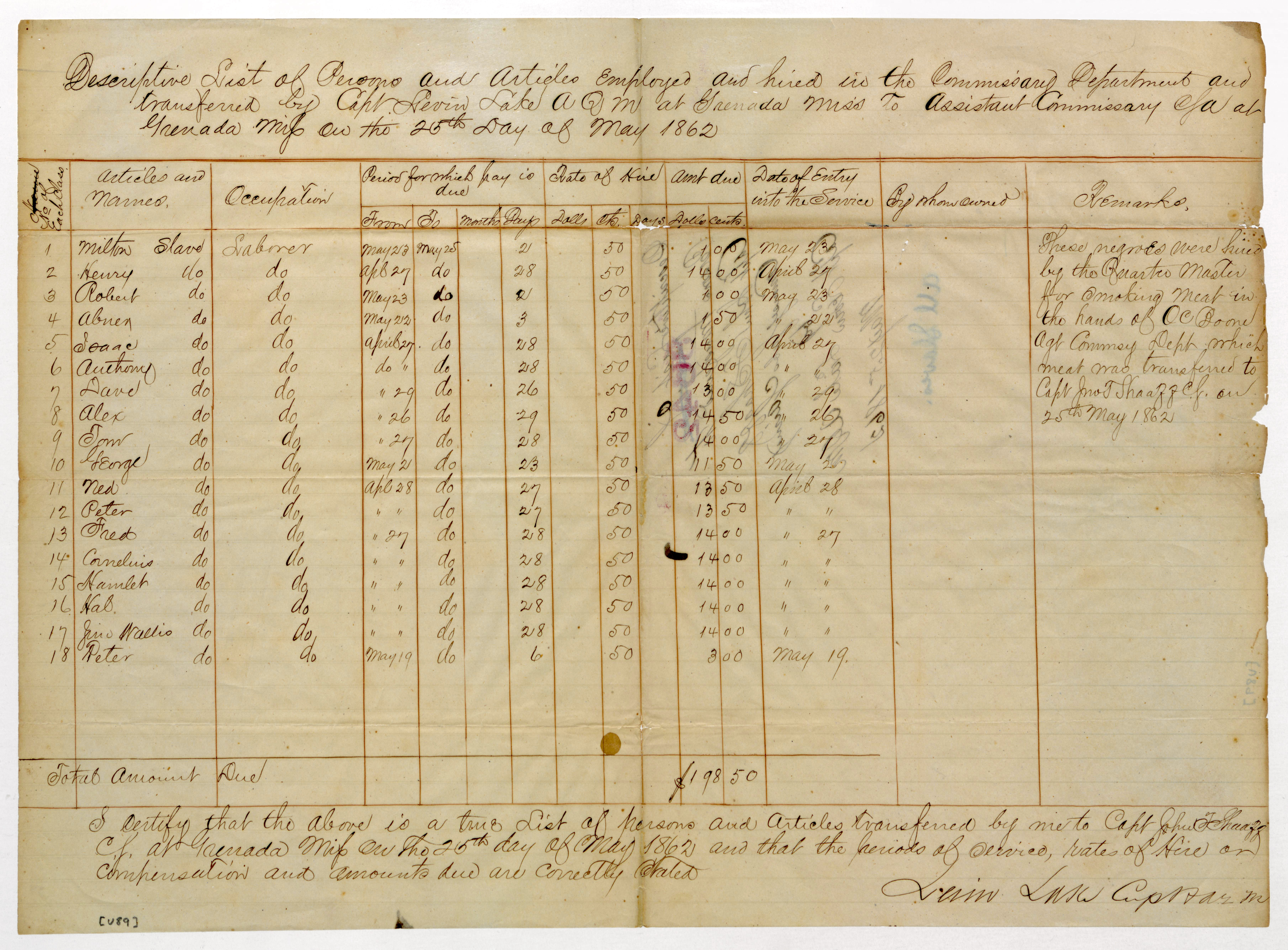
Enslaved men Milton, Henry, Robert, Abner, Isaac, Anthony, Dave, Alex, Tom, George, Ned, Peter, Fred, Cornelius, Hamlet, Hal, Jim Wallis, and Peter worked smoking meat for the Confederate Army in Grenada, Mississippi from April 26 to May 17, 1862, earning their legal owners 50¢ per day (NAID 143509078)

The role of slavery on the size of the Confederate Army was complicated. While the use of slave labor in camps freed white soldiers to fight, the population was said to be more willing to send their white men to the army than risk the life and labor of their slaves. In October 1862, the Confederacy passed a draft bill known as the "Twenty Slave Law" that allowed one white male to stay behind on plantations with twenty or more slaves, which was meant to protect property on large plantations but also alienated many non-slaveholders in the south.

=== Impressment ===
Even before hostilities began, slaves were used in the construction of batteries at places like Charleston, South Carolina and Mobile, Alabama. The first state to pass legislation that allowed for the impressment of slaves was Florida in 1862. However, few slaves were impressed under the law until the Confederate government passed its own legislation on the matter. Alabama and Virginia would also pass their own impressment laws before the Confederacy did.

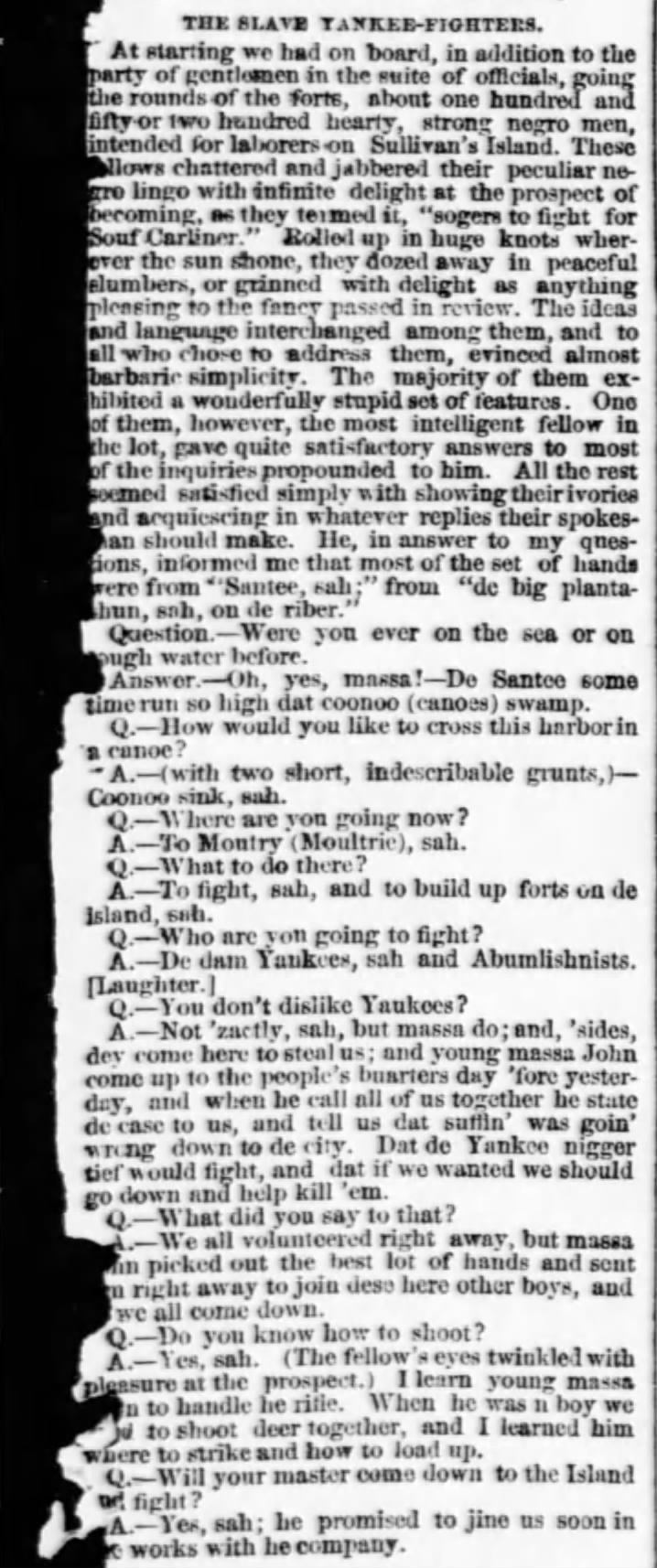
One enslaved man, from a gang that had been sent from a plantation on the Santee River down to Charleston Harbor to build up the "works of defence above Moultrie on Sullivan's Island," was interviewed by a newspaper reporter and seemed acutely aware of the irony of his circumstances: Q.–Who are you going to fight? A.–De dam Yankees, sah and de Abumlishnests. [Laughter.] ("The Slave Yankee-Fighters" Daily Missouri Republican, January 24, 1861)

The Confederate Congress passed a slave impressment law on March 26, 1863. This law raised questions about whether or not the Confederacy could seize free blacks, who numbered about 260,000 in the South in 1860. The Virginia legislature dealt with this issue by subjecting free blacks to the Confederate draft to serve in non-combat roles and limiting the number of slaves the government could impress. In this way, commanders in Virginia had the power to force-free and enslaved blacks into service. However, a limited number of free blacks were actually impressed. In part, this is because the proportion of free blacks who were males of military age was relatively small and many of those were already working in military-related tasks. For much of the war, Confederate soldiers were relatively comfortable and well supplied. However, by the spring of 1864, the situation tightened. On March 4, 1864, Confederate General Order No 28 said that officers and enlisted men would receive one ration per day, giving no consideration for body servants. A number of commanders protested and a letter was sent to the government on March 19 signed by officers including Generals Richard Ewell, Jubal Early, Stephen Ramseur, and John Gordon requesting an increase in rations to account for servants.

Slave labor was not free of the perils of war, and Confederates occasionally wrote about slave laborers facing enemy shelling. While slave-owners expected compensation when slaves died in the service of the Confederate Army, most Confederates did not own slaves and preferred a dead black worker than a dead white one. Thus, the hazardous conditions of slave labor may have been in part premeditated.

In some cases, a plantation's slaves were asked to volunteer to join the army, and some were excited about the change in tasks. However, the Confederacy had more need for laborers than was filled by slaves. In part, this was exacerbated by the refusal of white Confederate soldiers to join in the necessary labor in many cases. The Confederate government set up impressment bureaus to ensure slaveholders furnished enough slaves. In Texas in June 1863, district commander John Magruder was put in charge of one such bureau, and Magruder was known for his ability to usually succeed in appeals to slaveholder patriotism to acquire slaves rather than impressment. In the West, General Nathan Bedford Forrest led numerous cavalry raids where he captured many slaves who had fled behind Union lines, often sending excess to other commands. Confederate forces also made raids on Union-controlled plantations in the south, particularly along the Mississippi River. When Confederate forces marched North, such as during the Gettysburg campaign under Robert E. Lee, Confederates in Pennsylvania rounded up as many blacks as possible, whether they were free before the war or not. These individuals became part of the spoils of war. Northerners asked camp servants in the Confederate Army marching in the north why they did not flee to freedom. It would have been difficult for them to escape during the campaign, however. Fleeing to the north may not have seemed like an appealing option as, in some cases, northerners expressed their racism and dislike for blacks in the presence of Confederate soldiers and servants.

Even before the government authorized the impressment of slaves, officers forced thousands of slaves to work, and the scale of slave projects during the war was greater than those present on plantations, where only one master's slaves worked. Slaves built fortifications at Richmond, Fort Henry, Fort Donelson, Island No. 10, Vicksburg, Port Hudson, Wilmington, and Mobile. In September 1862, Confederate General P. G. T. Beauregard was in charge of coastal defenses in South Carolina and Georgia and had 1,400 slaves working on the fortifications at Savannah. In May 1862, 7,500 slaves were said to be working at Mobile. In the spring of 1863, between 4,000 and 6,000 slaves were said to be working on the railways running into Richmond. In November 1862, Robert E. Lee was in charge of defenses of the North Carolina, South Carolina, and Georgia coasts and had 3,330 slaves working in the fortifications at Wilmington. Slave labor on fortifications ultimately undermined slavery, as it served as justification for the Confiscation acts and ultimately the 13th Amendment discussed below.

Near the war's end, slaves were in high demand to fortify the last bastions of the Confederacy. In the defense of Atlanta, General Joseph E. Johnston called for 12,000 slaves to join his army as teamsters and cooks, but such a large number was never furnished for any general, although slaves were an important part of the campaign, building fallback lines for the stubbornly retreating Confederate army to man. At Richmond, Lee received 2,000 of his requested 5,000 to relieve white teamsters for duty in the lines.

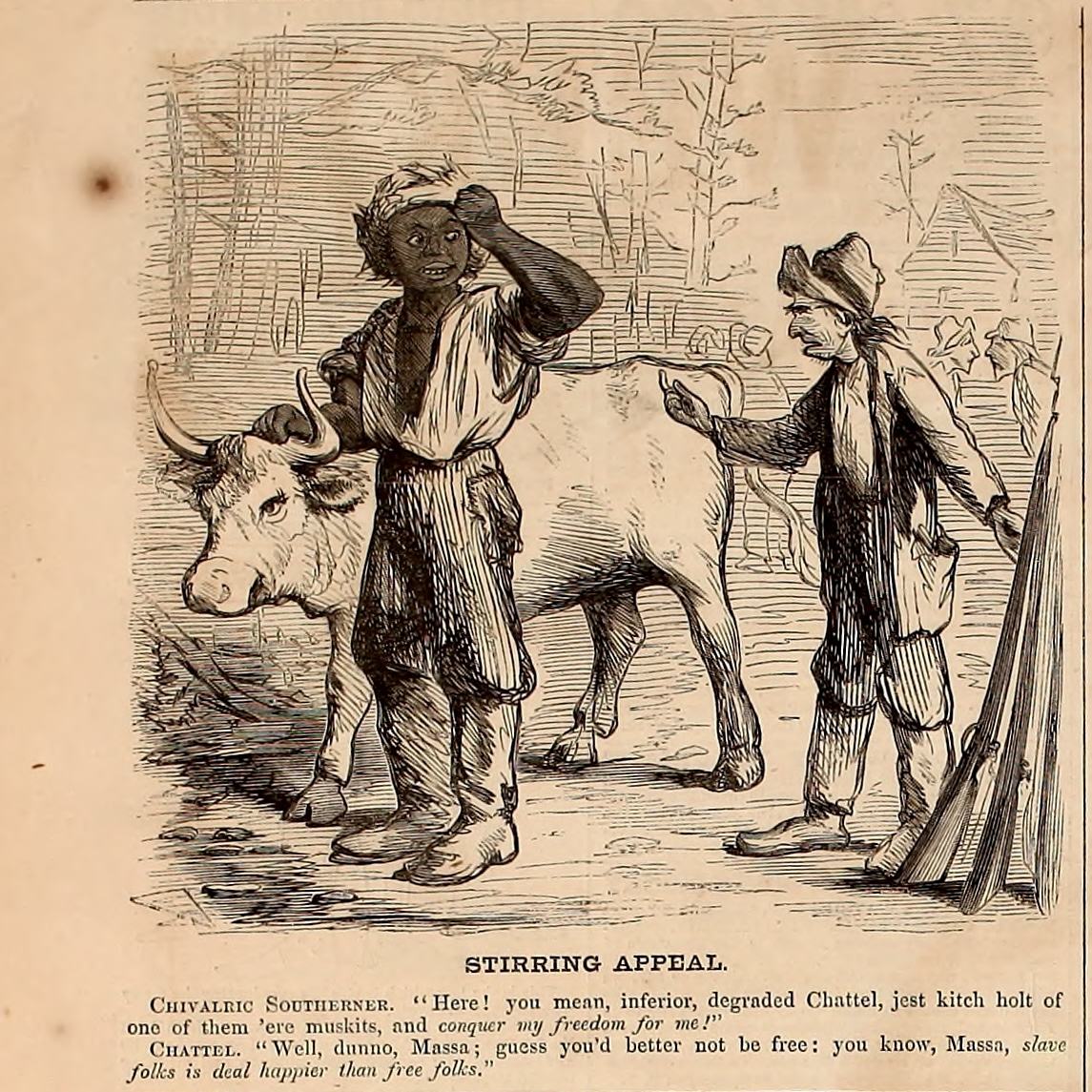
"Stirring Appeal" (Harper's Weekly, December 10, 1864)

Near the end of the war, the Confederacy made efforts to enlist black soldiers. In November 1864, Confederate president Jefferson Davis called on the Confederate Congress to purchase 40,000 slaves who would then be emancipated in return for military service. Such calls were very contentious in the south, with General Patrick Cleburne being a leading proponent of arming slaves. Among the opposition to the idea, General Howell Cobb argued in January 1865, "If slaves will make good soldiers our whole theory of slavery is wrong." As the Confederacy collapsed in early 1864 and 1865, arming slaves became, in the words of General Robert E. Lee, "not only expedient but necessary." In March 1865, Davis authorized the enlistment of blacks to the Confederate army and companies began to form by March 25. However, Lee's Army of Northern Virginia surrendered on April 9, and the war was over by the end of May 1865, before black soldiers had a chance to fight on the Confederate side.

== Confederate no-quarter policy ==
Historian George S. Burkhardt argues that the Confederate Army had consistent no-quarter policy in engagement with black Federals of which the massacre at Fort Pillow was just the most infamous example. Per Burkhardt, Confederates were motivated to execute black soldiers by a mix of fear, rage, humiliation, revenge, and, above all, race hatred: "To Southerners, slave owners or not, the African chattels were not people. They were animate property, nothing more." Burkhardt's book, Confederate Rage, Yankee Wrath: No Quarter in the Civil War, examines incidents like the case of July 30, 1864 in Petersburg, Virginia, when "about five hundred black soldiers, wounded, surrendered, or trapped, fell in a no-quarter rampage by Confederates." Many such massacres of U.S. Colored Troops were documented, including at Simpsonsville, Kentucky, and Saltville, Kentucky (where wounded black soldiers were taken from their hospital beds and summarily executed) and at the Battle of Poison Spring in Arkansas.

Meanwhile, the slave trade in Confederate States continued through the war. In 1933 a formerly enslaved man named William Sellers was interviewed in Shippenberg, Pennsylvania, and he recalled another wartime atrocity: "Mr. Sellers tells of an incident which has been indelibly marked upon his memory. A group of negro slaves were being taken to Richmond to be sold at public auction. The arrival of Union troops necessitated that the slaves be held over at Madison, where they were placed in the Madison jail. When it was discovered that the Union troops would raid Madison and set free the slaves in the jail, the jail was set afire and it blazed away, burning with it the colored women and children."

== Contraband ==
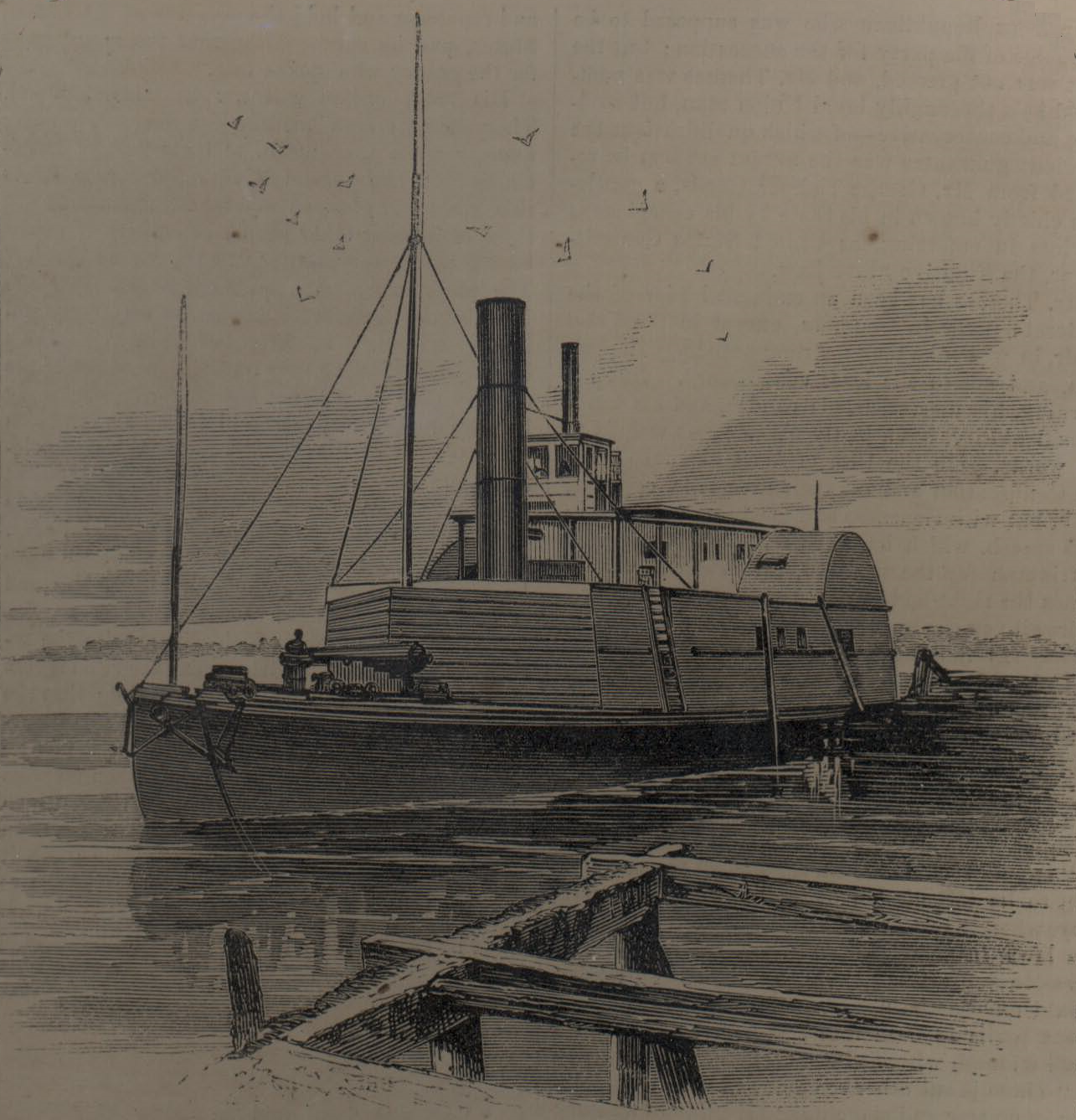
The gunboat USS Planter, stolen and run out of Charleston by escaping slave and future Congressman, Robert Smalls, in May 1862

At the outset of the war, Abraham Lincoln hoped to keep the Union intact with or without slavery. Early in the war, there was belief that the conflict would be chivalric in character and Union generals hesitated to aid escaping slaves. By 1862, however, the bitterness of the conflict became clear, and the Union Army began to seize slaves in earnest. As early as May 1861, Union General Benjamin F. Butler, in command at Fort Monroe, Virginia, refused to return escaped slaves who reached Union lines to their owners. Instead, Butler employed them in the quartermaster department, reasoning that returning the slaves would aid the enemy, and the Grand Contraband Camp, Virginia was formed. Lincoln allowed Butler's policy to stand, and on August 6, 1861, Congress passed the First Confiscation Act which allowed the government to seize all property used by the Confederacy, including slaves. However, Union commanders were officially instructed to exclude runaway slaves until July 1862, when Lincoln admitted the importance of allowing slaves to escape to Union lines was a military necessity. The escaped slaves came to be known as "contrabands" and more than 200,000 such people came to work for the Union Army. Initially, contrabands worked as teamsters, blacksmiths, cooks, coopers, carpenters, bakers, butchers, laundresses, and personal servants, and performed other menial duties. Over the course of the war, many contrabands took on more formal employment in support of the Union Army, particularly as cattle drivers, stevedores, and pioneer laborers. Lincoln feared that emancipation would drive border states into the Confederacy, and he blocked efforts by Union General John C. Frémont and by Secretary of War Simon Cameron to push forward emancipation and the enlistment of black soldiers, respectively.

On the other hand, some Union Army generals continued to return escaped slaves to their masters, particularly Democrats such as Generals Henry Halleck, George B. McClellan, and Don Carlos Buell. Halleck's General Order No. 3 barred fugitive slaves from his lines.

However, slaves strongly desired to be free and to contribute to their own emancipation. Black people were fundamental in engendering anti-slavery and emancipation sentiment in the North. Union soldiers saw the scars on the bodies of slaves they encountered marching in the South and saw the relative squalor in which they lived. They heard the stories of slaves and saw their willingness to fight for their own freedom and join the Union Army.

This willingness to fight was irresistible to Union generals in need of manpower. Since 1792, federal law prohibited Black men from serving in the state militias and the U.S. Army, but that changed during the war. In May 1862, General James H. Lane in Kansas and John W. Phelps in Louisiana began to enlist Black men into regiments without War Department authorization. Lane's efforts resulted in the First Kansas Colored Volunteers, but Phelps was initially opposed by his superior, General Butler. Butler, however, desperate for reinforcements, relented in August 1862, resulting in the Louisiana Native Guards, which was made up largely of freedmen. Also in May 1862, General David Hunter proclaimed martial law and ordered slaves freed in the area around his command at Fort Pulaski on the Georgia coast, a command that included sections of coastal South Carolina, Georgia, and Florida. On May 19, Lincoln annulled Hunter's emancipation decree but remained silent on aspects of Hunter's proclamation involving the enlistment of slaves. Among the few Black officers in these early regiments were freedmen William D. Matthews and Caesar Antoine.

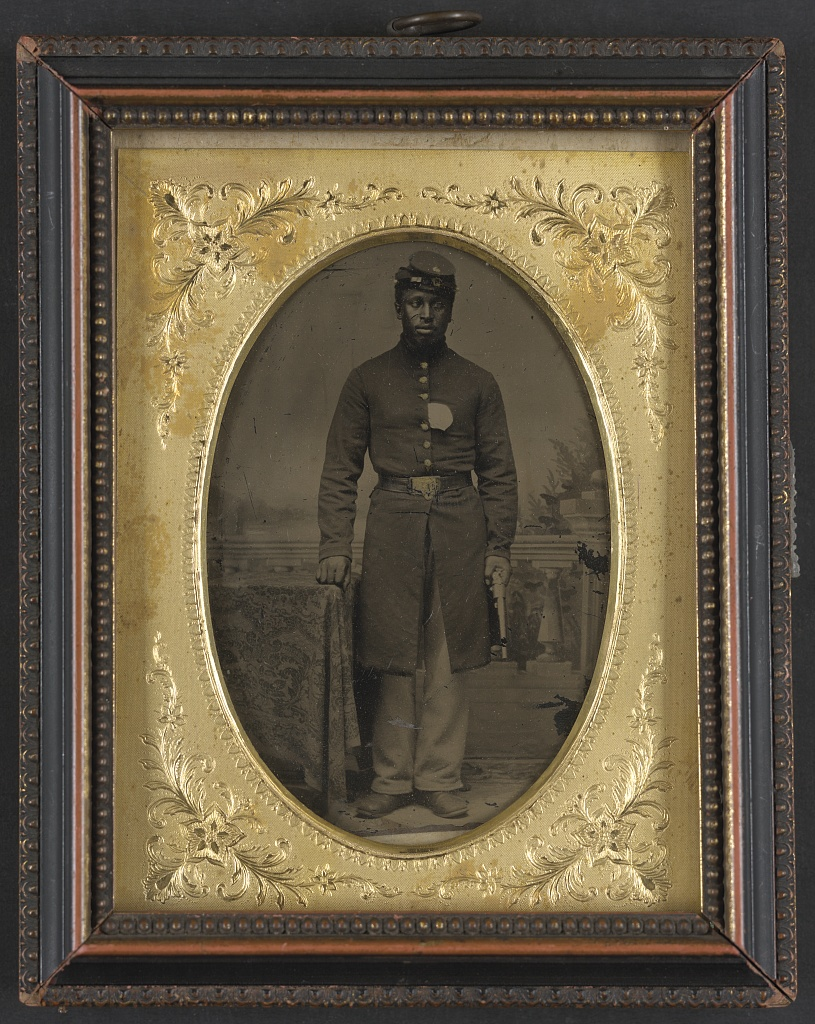
Sergeant Tom Strawn of Company B, 3rd U.S. Colored Troops USCT Heavy Artillery Regiment (Library of Congress); according to a 2003 article in the journal Army History, "More than 25,000 black artillerymen, recruited primarily from freed slaves in Confederate or border states, served in the Union Army during the Civil War...Federal military authorities armed and equipped the soldiers in these twelve-company heavy artillery regiments as infantrymen and ordinarily used them to man the larger caliber guns defending coastal and field fortifications located near cities and smaller population centers in Louisiana, Mississippi, Tennessee, Kentucky, and North Carolina."

In September 1862, Stanton authorized General Rufus Saxton, who had taken Hunter's position in command of parts of coastal South Carolina, to arm blacks to help guard coastal plantations, leading to the First South Carolina Colored Volunteers in 1862 and the establishment of colonies at places like Edisto Island and Port Royal. Hunter's recruitment of Black men was debated in Congress, with Charles A. Wickliffe and Robert Mallory of Kentucky opposing the efforts and Thaddeus Stevens leading the support for the efforts. Lincoln's quiet official policies in favor of emancipation and enlistment of slaves and loud repudiation of Hunter and Frémont led to criticism by many abolitionists, including William Lloyd Garrison.

== Emancipation ==
Executive and legislative efforts to end slavery started early in the war. In November 1861, Lincoln proposed a plan of compensated emancipation for slaves in the state of Delaware, a proposal that was rejected by the Delaware legislature. Lincoln proposed compensated emancipation programs again in early 1862 estimating that such a policy for Border States would be less expensive than continued war. The appeal was again rejected in March 1862. A third attempt was made on July 12, 1862, when representatives of Border States rejected a compensated emancipation plan proposed by Lincoln. In March 1862, Congress enacted an Article of War circumventing much of the Fugitive Slave Laws of 1793 and 1850, and in April Congress abolished slavery in Washington D. C. compensating slaveholders and offering money to assist in immigration of slaves to Haiti or Liberia. In June, Congress emancipated slaves in Federal territories without compensation, overturning the Dred Scott v. Sandford decision of 1857.

After the repeated rejection of compensated emancipation plans, Lincoln began to contemplate a presidential emancipation decree in mid-1862. On July 17, 1862, Congress passed the Militia Act which emancipated Confederate bondsmen employed by the Union army and authorized the president to receive into service blacks for "any military or naval service for which they may be found competent", authorizing the enlistment of blacks although intended to only apply to slaves of disloyal slave-owners and not to free blacks or slaves of loyal border state slave-owners. That same day, Congress passed the Second Confiscation Act, which authorized the emancipation of slaves of people engaged in rebellion. Lincoln was slow to enact the provisions of the Second Confiscation Act, which was criticized by abolitionists, particularly Frederick Douglass.

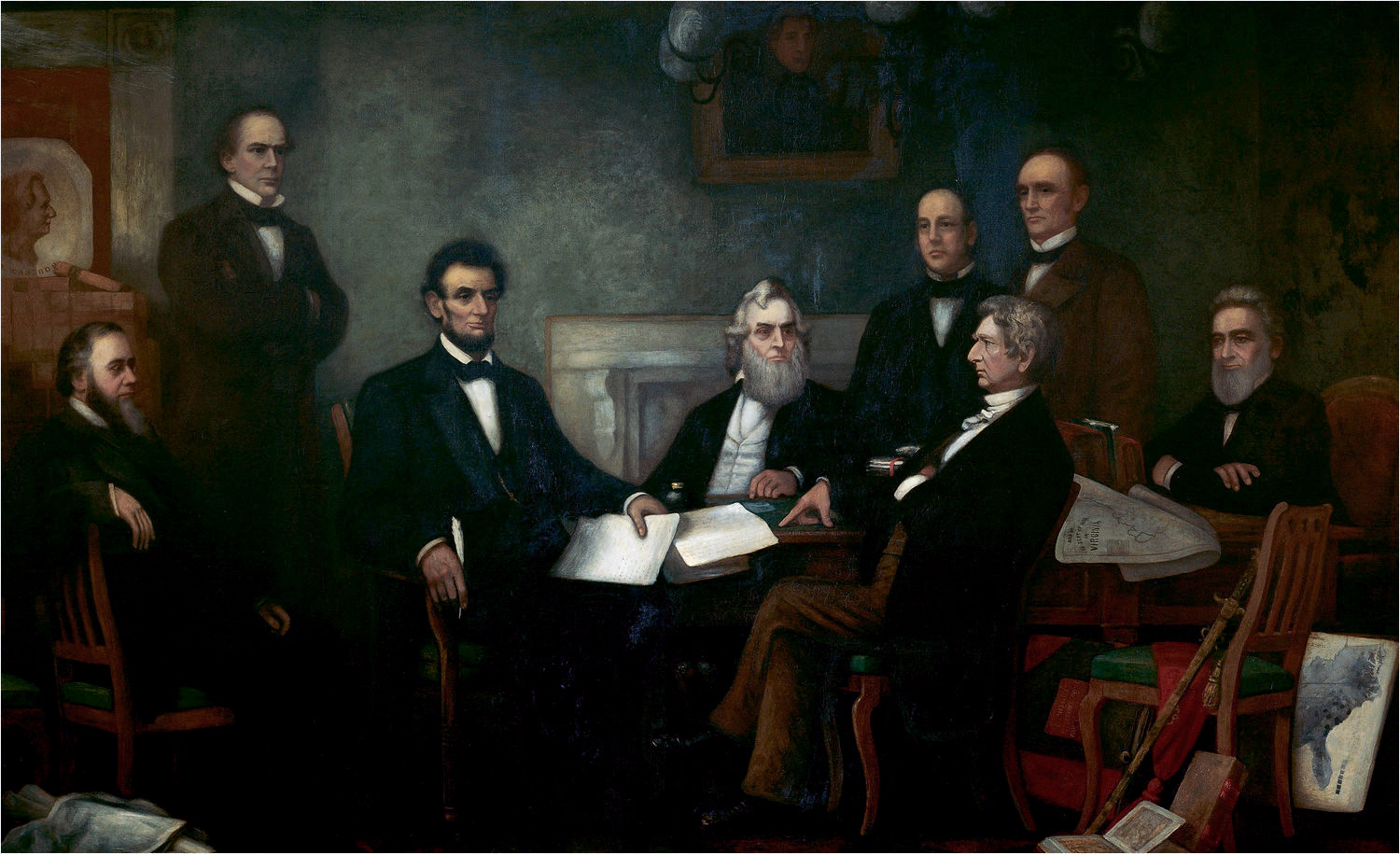
First Reading of the Emancipation Proclamation of President Lincoln by Francis Bicknell Carpenter (People in the image are clickable.)

On July 21, 1862, four days after signing the Militia and Second Confiscation Acts, Lincoln met with his cabinet to inform them that he intended to implement the military and emancipation provisions of the acts, but not the colonization, and the next day he shared with the cabinet the preliminary emancipation proclamation. His proposal would extend to slaves beyond those under Federal Control and would be made as a war measure, which could circumvent the courts and legislature. In order to avoid alienating the Border States, particularly Kentucky, Lincoln chose not to unveil his new position until the New Year. In part, this decision to delay stemmed from a desire to wait to make the proclamation until the Union Army had made some advances to ensure that the proclamation did not to appear to be made out of desperation. McClellan's victory at the Battle of Antietam in late summer 1862 gave Lincoln political capital, which was important in allowing Lincoln to issue his emancipation proclamation. Abolitionists such as Frederick Douglass greatly approved Lincoln's new position, writing, "The white man is liberated, the black man is liberated, the brave men now fighting in the battles of their country against rebels and traitors are now liberated..."

The Emancipation Proclamation aided the Union war effort, depriving the Confederacy of their slave labor and encouraging the former slaves to join the Union. It also served to discourage any aid from Britain and France that the Confederacy sought by showing that the Union fought for emancipation. Support for emancipation strengthened in the North, as the deaths of friends and relatives caused Northerners to view the war as an effort to end slavery.

The proclamation did receive some criticism, particularly from the South. It also only freed slaves in Confederate-controlled areas, exempting about 800,000 of the country's 2.9 million slaves. In addition, it depended on Union gains in the war for its enforcement. Among opponents were General William T. Sherman, who frequently complained about emancipation and enlistment but who complied with the edicts.

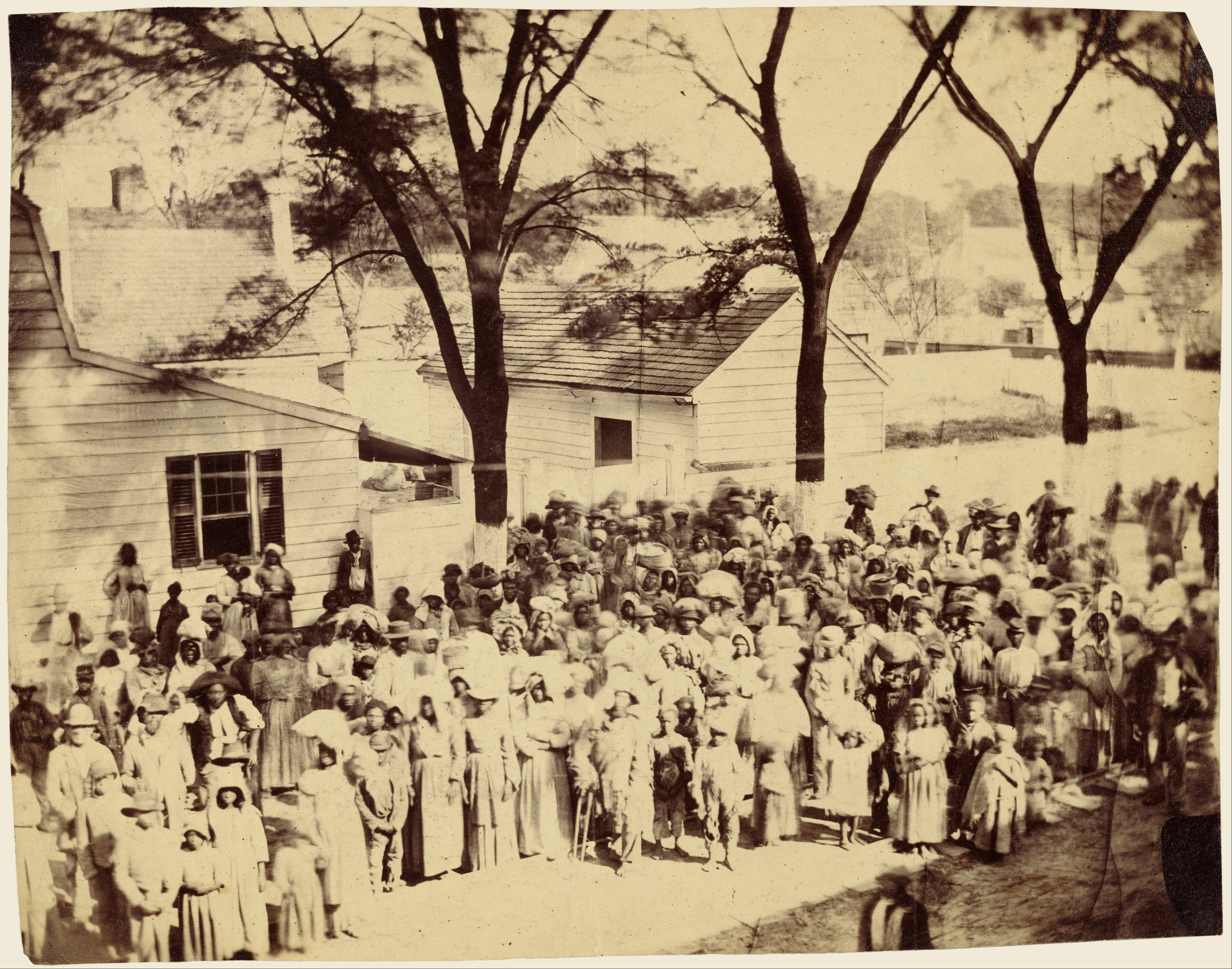
Freed slaves on J. J. Smith's cotton plantation on the Sea Islands near Beaufort, South Carolina, photographed by Timothy O'Sullivan standing before their quarters in 1862

Throughout the war, slaves were emancipating themselves. The two major events which allowed slaves to choose freedom were the increased possibility of escaping as white men who otherwise controlled slaves leaving the plantations for the Confederate Army and the advance of Union troops into close proximity. To prevent the former, attempts were made to better organize slave patrol and use the militia for such control, but these were less effective because the slave owners especially experienced in keeping their own slaves in bondage were often away in the Army. The advance of the Union Army had a large effect on slavery in the areas they came to control. The first region the Union Army captured was the Sea Islands off the coast of South Carolina and Georgia. Confederates reported that after their masters fled, the slaves in those areas pillaged their masters' property. The Union also made gains in western Kentucky, western Tennessee, and northern Mississippi.

Occupying Union forces made a number of efforts to provide for freed slaves. In Tennessee, General Ulysses S. Grant appointed John Eaton, Jr. to be in charge of fugitives, and a camp was established at Grand Junction, Tennessee, later moved to Memphis, which organized these efforts. The camp provided shelter, food, and a small amount of medical attention. It also centralized the hiring of freedmen to whites who leased abandoned plantations; transforming agriculture in Union-held areas from a slave to a wage-based labor system. This same system had already been implemented in 1862 along the South Carolina coast in the Port Royal Experiment. Efforts were not universally successful, as tension developed between goals of efficiency and of black autonomy. In several locations, including Jefferson Davis' properties at Davis Bend, Mississippi, freed blacks were allotted land and given direct control. In spite of these examples, most freed slaves shifted to wage laborers, which were more similar to sharecropping than real freedom. This failure of provision of a solid economic footing for freed slaves has been considered a cause of the failure of Reconstruction.

=== Colored Troops ===
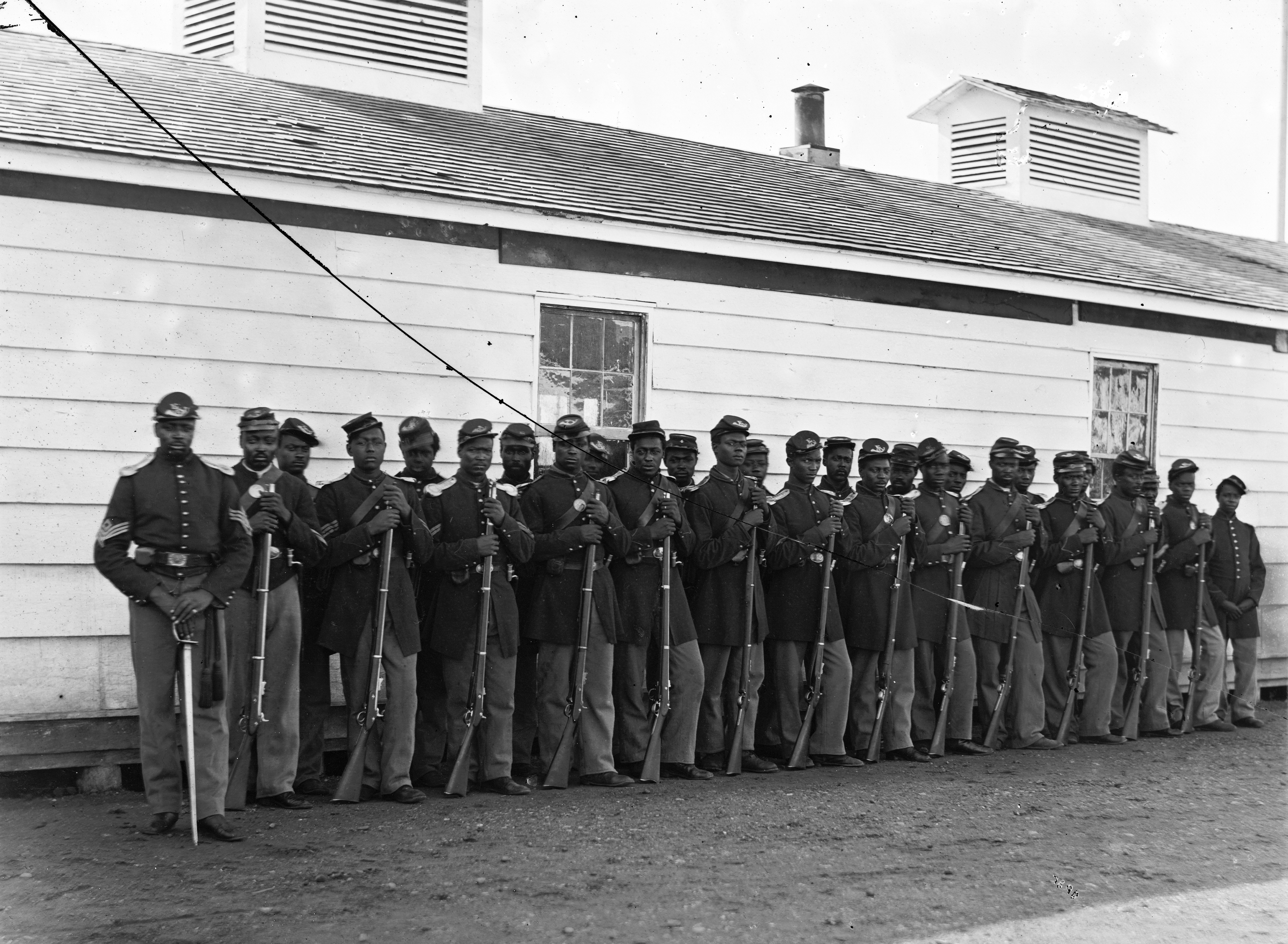
A company of 4th United States Colored Troops (USCT). USCT regiments formed up to a tenth of the Union army.

After the Emancipation Proclamation, black soldiers became commonplace and eventually numbered 178,895 with 133,000 coming from slave states and mostly consisting of former slaves. Northerners were initially uncomfortable arming blacks and black troops were usually placed under white officers. They were also given inferior equipment and medical care and assigned disproportionate amounts of heavy labor. However, the success of these regiments led to a change in perspective. The Confederate government and army were infuriated with the northern use of black soldiers, seeing such troops as slave insurrectionary and subjecting captured black soldiers to re-enslavement or death for treason. In December 1862, Jefferson Davis issued what has been called the "Anti-Emancipation Proclamation" which declared that the Confederate Army would return to slavery any black man found in Federal Uniform and turn over to the states any slaves found aiding Northern units and would do the same with white officers of black regiments. This led to Lincoln threatening to kill a captured rebel soldier for every black Union soldier killed in captivity, and that every captured black soldier committed to slavery would be responded to by giving a Confederate captive hard labor. No official retaliation of this sort occurred.

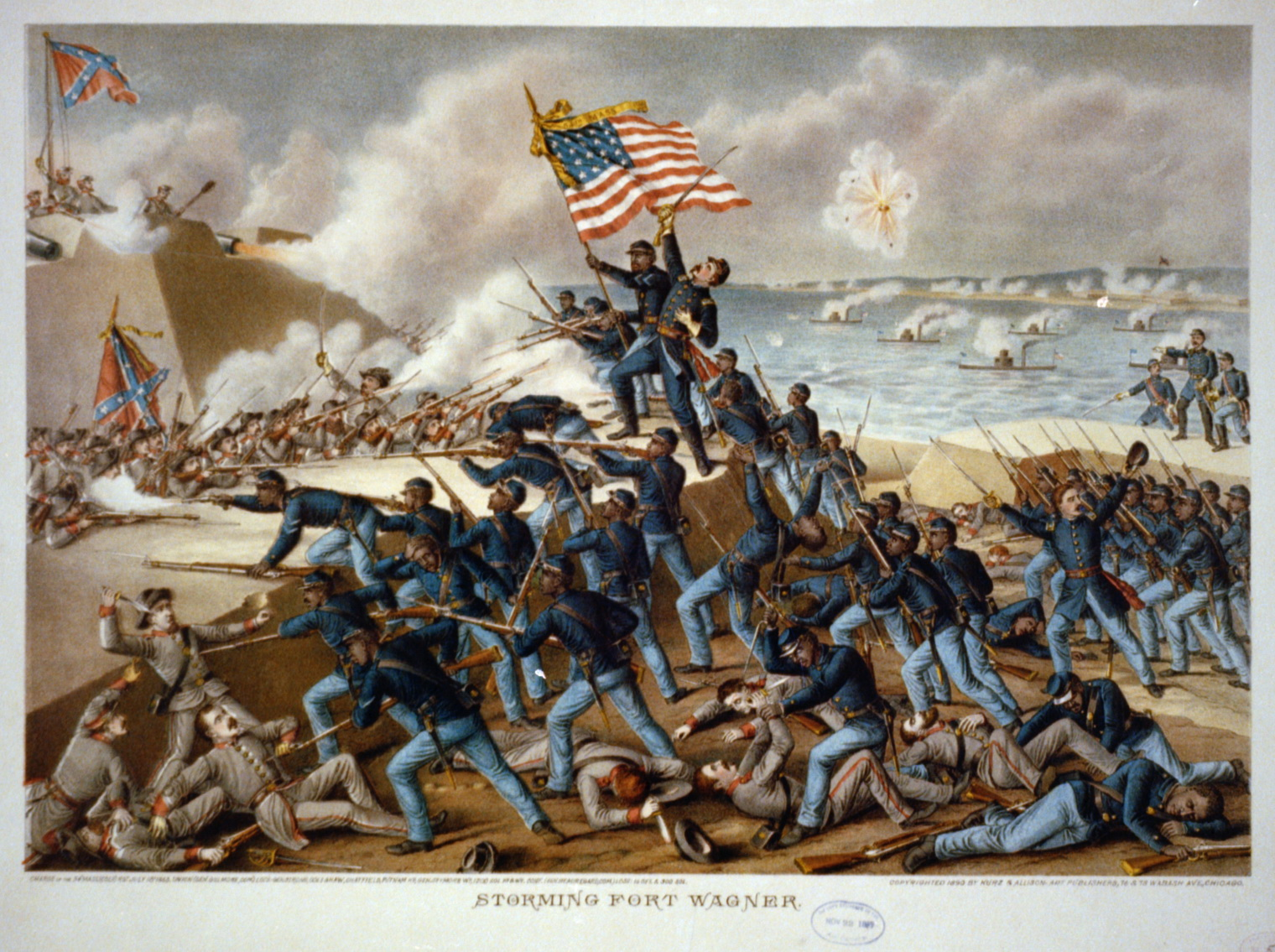
A lithograph of the storming of Fort Wagner.

Black troops were not considered equal, either by Federals or Confederates. Black soldiers were often exposed to more difficult conditions and had worse medical care. The mortality rate for black soldiers was about 40% higher than that for white troops, and over 38,000 black soldiers died from all causes. On the battlefield, Black soldiers performed well, earning the respect of Union and Confederate Troops alike. However, Confederate victories against black soldiers led to atrocities where surrendering black Union soldiers were executed by Confederates. Two of the most notable such occurrences were in 1864 in the Battle of Fort Pillow in Tennessee and the Battle of the Crater in Virginia. Evidence is mixed over whether or not there was an official no-quarter policy, but at these victories, black soldiers were killed at a greatly disproportionate ratio.

== Aftermath ==
At the beginning of 1865, millions of black people remained as slaves, but the institution was crumbling. As the Confederate Army weakened, the Confederacy's ability to assert racial control lessened and large numbers of slaves were escaping to federal lines every day. Even as the large Armies surrendered, some Confederates held on to hope for victory and for the reassertion of slavery throughout the South. At the war's end, some Southern whites fled to South America where they could escape Federal law, and in some cases, continue slaveholding, although such cases were the exception.

Slaves saw emancipation as more than an end to slavery, but also education, voting rights, and rights before the law. The 13th Amendment passed in January 1865 ending slavery in the Union and ensuring that under US control, slaves in the south would be freed.

After the war ended, a narrative of faithful slaves arose in the south, with stories of slaves marching with their masters or celebrating the return of soldiers to the plantations. Blacks living in the south were no longer slaves, but most remained and worked for their former masters. Even so, racial tensions grew greatly during the Reconstruction era. White supremacy grew as well, represented by the growth of the militancy of the Ku Klux Klan and the growth of belief in the Lost Cause of the Confederacy movement. The KKK was a radical supremacist group that persecuted African Americans and African American supporters.

== Impact on U.S. foreign relations ==
The American Civil War did not merely exist in isolation on the North American continent, the impact that slavery had during the war on the foreign relations of the United States of America was still significant, despite being a domestic war and slavery being a domestic issue, it had international consequences. For example, the United States, especially the states that had seceded from the union, having an economic monopoly on the production of cotton and thus slavery maintained a key role in foreign policy and relations with other states and empires.

=== Impact on relations with the British Empire ===
Like many other European states, the United Kingdom had not recognised the Confederacy nor had they officially participated in the American Civil War. The UK and wider British Empire had abolished slavery decades before the war started. However, this did not mean that the country did not rely on American products, notably cotton for industrial purposes, in this case the textile industry. As a result of the Union's (formally the United States of America) blockade on the Confederacy's ports, cotton that once flowed to Europe now dropped in quantity, causing the Lancashire cotton famine and the reconsideration of Britain's neutral stance on the war. In exchange for cotton, Britain ran the risk of breaking through the blockade to supply the secessionist states with industrial capital, products and arms.

==== International public opinion and the Emancipation Proclamation ====
Although Britain was neutral, sympathies of the plight of African American slaves remained high amongst the public. The Province of Canada was a final stop along the Underground Railroad for slaves attempting to escape from the Confederacy and slave hunters. Abraham Lincoln's pledge to emancipate slaves in the Emancipation Proclamation solidified slavery as the prominent issue surrounding the war, and also influenced European opinion as the military situation of the United States now categorically rested on a social issue and moral crusade to end slavery on the North American continent. Nevertheless, British political and economic elite were concerned about the financial impact from the American Civil War on their economy.

=== Aftermath and legacy ===
Nations and empires across the world participated in the transatlantic slave trade before their respective laws abolitionist slavery were passed, from Denmark to Brazil. Although the United Kingdom, nor France diplomatically involved themselves in the war, because of the extremely immoral matter of slavery, the benefits to cotton plantation slave-owners, i.e. increased production of cotton, had an impact on their stance towards the Confederacy, despite both having abolished it. Moreover, the United States of America was able to officially end the debate as to the question of being a 'slave empire', re-establishing a contemporary moral compass on the international stage.

== Sources ==
- Boles, John B. (2015). Black Southerners, 1619-1869. University Press of Kentucky – via Project MUSE (subscription required)
- Clinton, Catherine (2004). Harriet Tubman: The Road to Freedom. New York: Little, Brown and Company.
- Fountain, Daniel L. (2010). Slavery, Civil War, and Salvation: African American Slaves and Christianity, 1830-1870. LSU Press – via Project MUSE (subscription required)
- Manning, Chandra (2007). What This Cruel War Was Over: Soldiers, Slavery, and the Civil War. New York: Alfred A. Knopf.
- Martinez, Jaime Amanda (2013). Confederate Slave Impressment in the Upper South. UNC Press Books – via Project MUSE (subscription required)
- Martinez, Jaime Amanda. "The Slave Market in Civil War Virginia." in Ayers, Edward L., Gary W. Gallagher, and Andrew J. Torget, eds. Crucible of the Civil War: Virginia from Secession to Commemoration. University of Virginia Press, 2006. 106–135.
- McWhirter, Christian (2012). Battle Hymns: The Power and Popularity of Music in the Civil War. Chapel Hill, North Carolina: University of North Carolina Press. – via Project MUSE (subscription required)
- Simmons, William J., and Henry McNeal Turner (1887). Men of Mark: Eminent, Progressive and Rising. Cleveland, Ohio: O. G. M. Rewell & Company.
- Smith, John David (2013). Lincoln and the US Colored Troops. SIU Press – via Project MUSE (subscription required)
- Woodward, Colin Edward (2014). Marching Masters: Slavery, Race, and the Confederate Army during the Civil War. University of Virginia Press. – via Project MUSE (subscription required)
