= Rushmore G. Horton =

American white supremacist (1826–1867)

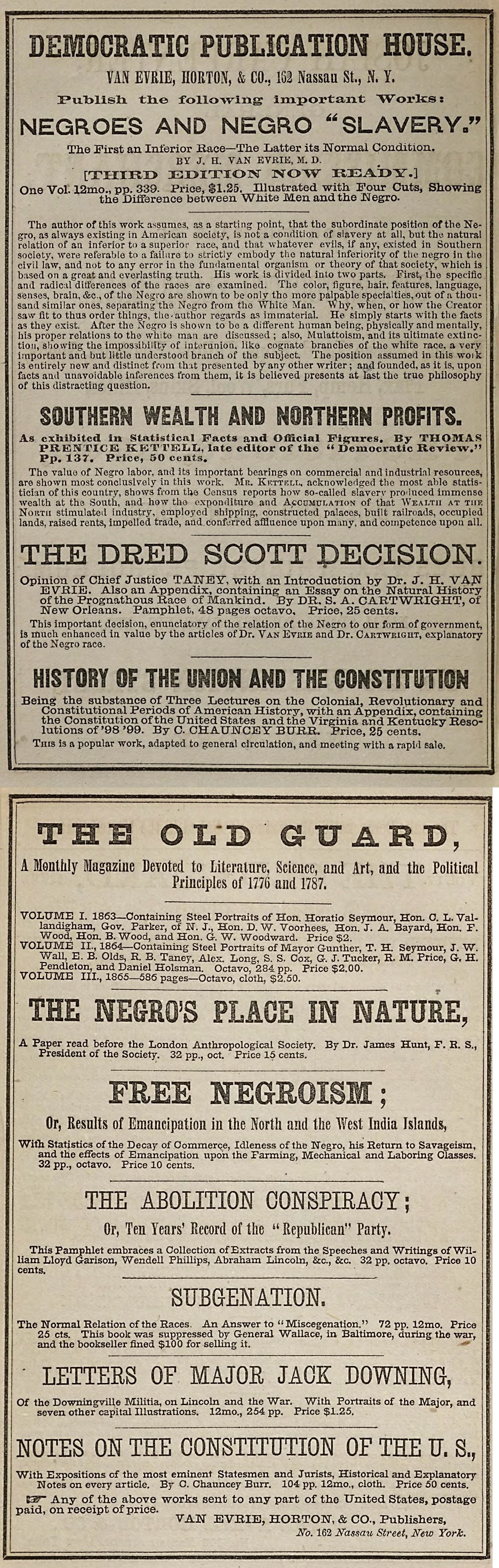
Van Evrie Horton & Co. publications, 1866

Rushmore George Horton (1826–1867), often publishing as R. G. Horton, was an American white supremacist and pro-slavery writer and book publisher. A native of New York, he was business partners with John H. Van Evrie, who has been described as America's "first professional racist." Historian Mark Neeley describes Horton as "a loyal Democratic scribbler to whom the party turned in haste in the summer of 1856 to write a campaign biography of their presidential candidate," James Buchanan.

Beginning in 1857 Horton and Van Evrie co-edited the New York Day Book, later the Weekly Caucasian. The younger Horton had replaced Nathaniel B. Stimson, who had founded the Day Book newspaper and then died at age 42. The offices of the pro-slavery Day Book were not far from the offices of Horace Greeley's anti-slavery New-York Tribune, which was located before the American Civil War in an old wooden building at the corner of Nassau and Spruce streets in New York City.

Horton is the credited author of The Life and Public Services of James Buchanan, The History of the Tammany Society, and A Youth's History of the Great Civil War in the United States, from 1861–1865. In 1864, Horton was elected secretary of the Anti-Abolition State Rights Society. He died at Dobbs Ferry, New York in 1867. At least one library catalog notes that A Youth's History was written by "a sympathizer with the southern cause." When a revised edition of his A Youth's History was published in 1926, the Tampa Tribune stated that, "This book merits the support of all southern people and of all interested in an authentic story of the period of the Civil War."
