= John H. Van Evrie =

American physician, professional racist (1814?–1896)

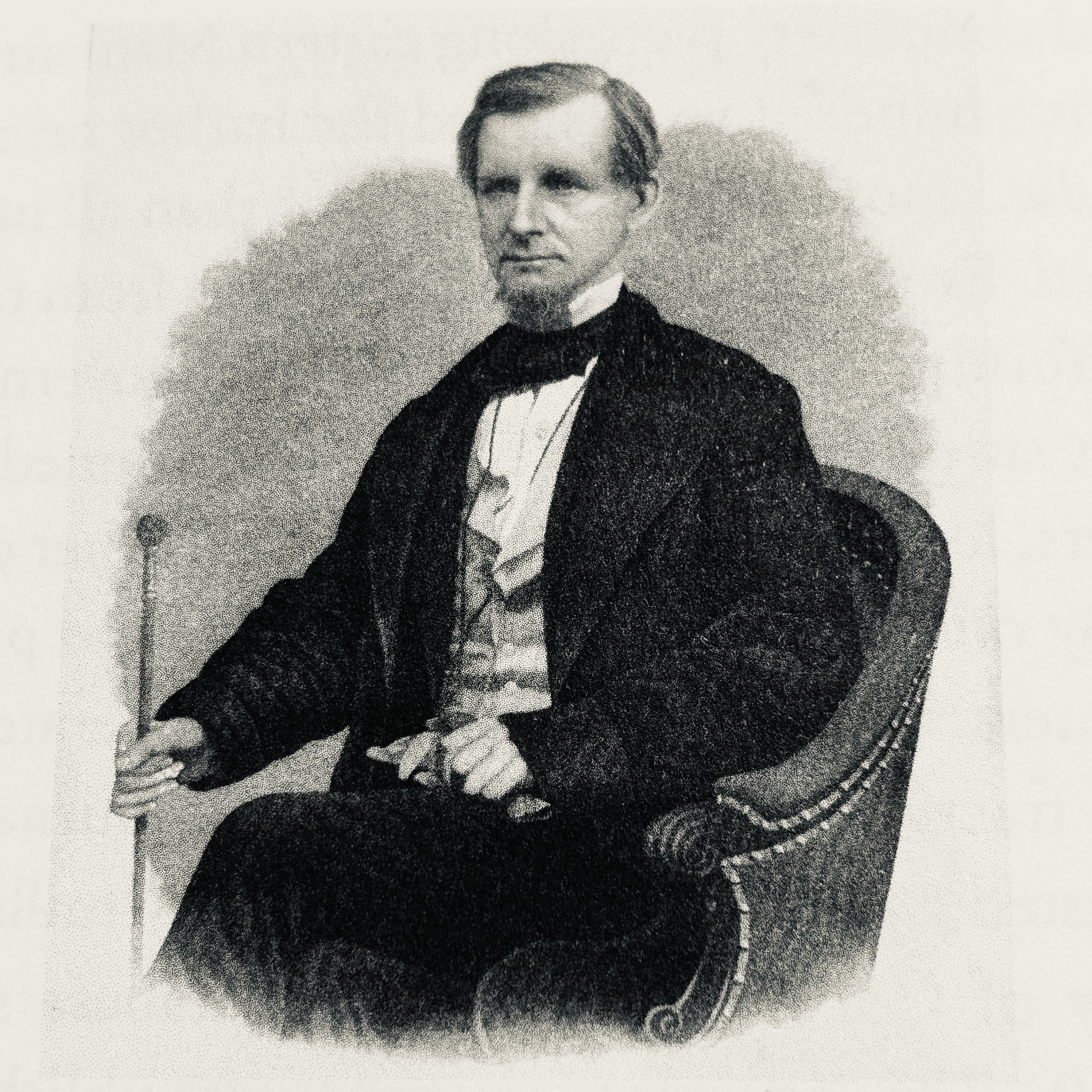
- Portrait of John H. Van Evrie (1814?–1896), America's "first professional racist" (1860s engraving by W. G. Jackman, via American Antiquarian Society and Teaching White Supremacy, 2022)
- Born: 1814
- Died: 1896 (aged 81–82)
- Occupations: Writer, publisher, editor, physician
- Writing career
- Language: English
- Subjects: Race in the United States, scientific racism, slavery in the United States, white supremacy

John H. Van Evrie (1814–1896) was an American physician and defender of slavery best known as the editor of the Weekly Day Book and the author of several books on race and slavery which reproduced the ideas of scientific racism for a popular audience. He was also the proprietor of the publishing company Van Evrie, Horton & Company. Van Evrie was described by the historian George M. Fredrickson as "perhaps the first professional racist in American history." His thought, which lacked significant scientific evidence even for the time, emphasized the inferiority of black people to white people, defended slavery as practiced in the United States and attacked abolitionism, while opposing class distinctions among white people and the oppression of the white working class. He repeatedly put "slave" and "slavery" in quotation marks, because he did not think these were the right words for enslaved Blacks.

== Early life and medical practice ==
Van Evrie was born in 1814. In a 1949 article Sidney Kaplan wrote that he "received a medical degree somewhere. Whether he practiced is problematical; most of his time seems to have been spent as a pseudo-scientific, screwball propagandist of Copperheadism in New York."

== Views ==
=== White superiority ===
Van Evrie believed black people were of "a separate species" from white people and that the boundaries between races were "absolutely impassable"; he brought this into line with the Bible's account of humanity's origin by proposing "a supernatural imposition at some subsequent period" (see Polygenism). He reinterpreted the Old Testament's account of Adam and Eve as a story of the origins of white people, and suggested that black people had their own separate beginnings. After Josiah C. Nott developed his theory of polygenesis in his Types of Mankind, Van Evrie applied them to the debate over slavery in Negroes and Negro "Slavery". There had been, in his view and that of Nott, not a single creation but rather multiple creations "in different places and of different forms to fit the needs of locality." Similarly, he reinterpreted the Golden Rule through a racial lens, arguing that one need only treat another as one would like to be treated if the other is of the same race as oneself.

Human skin color, in his view, was inevitable and irreversible, the product of a divine plan; he also believed that this meant that black people were permanently incapable of expressing emotion in the same way as white people. From this belief that black people could not express emotion, he concluded that they must also be unable to experience emotion to the same degree; and, as they were considered insufficiently sensitive to attain civilization, he believed that black people needed to remain enslaved. He also argued that black people's perceived inability to express emotions was proof of subhuman status. Van Evrie also believed that all black people shared certain uniform physical features (for example hair color, nose size and lip size), whereas these features were more varied among white people; he interpreted this to be further evidence of white superiority. He used evidence from the new field of ethnology to support his belief in white superiority and found evidence for moral superiority and inferiority in racially defined physiognomical features, including black people's "cranial manifestation" (on which topic he quoted statistics published by Samuel George Morton), brain size and hair. Van Evrie wrote at a time which he believed to be the first instance in history in which racial difference, and racial superiority and inferiority, could be divined from the "minutest particle [or] the single globule of blood".

He claimed that God had adapted the "physical and mental structures" of black people so as to ensure they could only live in the tropics, that black people reached full mental development by the age of fifteen, that a black person's "strongest affection" was "love for [their] master", and that they possessed a "sudden, capricious, superficial and temporary" sex drive. Because of these "capricious affections" and their "feeble moral nature", Van Evrie thought that marriage between slaves would be "obviously unnatural, monstrous, and wicked." Van Evrie also thought that black people were by their nature unsuited to marriage and incapable of political participation. Though he saw black people as unsuited to social or political equality, he felt that under competent guardianship they could be socially useful.

Van Evrie praised the "blush of maiden modesty" found in the white woman, and asked "Can anyone suppose such a thing possible to a black face?" He also specifically argued that black women were naturally promiscuous and unscrupulous with regard to sex and relationships, and commented on black people's familial relations. Black mothers, Van Evrie claimed, tended to leave their children at a younger age than white mothers, and, unlike white mothers, were unable to kill their children in order to save them from imminent disasters, because the black woman's "maternal instincts are more imperative, more closely approximate to the animal". He also claimed that black mothers were liable to become indifferent to their children by the age of 15, and no longer recognize them by age 40.

His theory of black inferiority was also applied to all people of color, which led him to the conclusion that Confucius and other Ancient Chinese figures had in fact been white.

=== Slavery ===
Van Evrie argued that the presence of black people and Native Americans in the United States provided the basis for American democracy; it "led directly to the establishment of a new system based on foundations of everlasting truth—the legal and political equality of the race, or of all those whom the Almighty Creator has Himself made equal." In Negroes and Negro "Slavery" Van Evrie argued that slavery was a necessary condition for white freedom because it allows the elite to be free of manual labor and so to pursue education, which for Van Evrie was the foundation of freedom. "[T]he existence of an inferior race" in the United States, he wrote,

...resulted in the creation of a new political and social order, and relieved the producing class from that abject dependence on capital which in Europe, and especially in England, renders them mere beasts of burden to a fraction of their brethren.

Citing the examples of Ancient Greece and Ancient Rome as evidence, Van Evrie also contended that slavery in the United States was preferable to its antecedents in the classical world, as slavery in the U.S. was only imposed on those for whom it was a "natural" condition. In "Free Negroism" he argued that the benefits of slavery for the Northern white working class included lower commodity prices and less labor competition; he wrote that the "'slave' negro is the poor man's friend" while "the 'freed' negro is his bitter and unrelenting enemy".

He felt that "slavery" was an unsuitable descriptor for the position of black people in the antebellum South, as the word implied an unnatural relationship, whereas the institution of slavery, for Van Evrie, was "the most desirable thing in human affairs". "The simple truth is," he wrote, that "there is no slavery in this country; there are no slaves in the Southern States." Van Evrie believed that slavery was divinely ordained as a part of nature: God had designed the races of humans for specific purposes, according to which slavery was the natural condition of black people; and white people, defined by certain physical features, were naturally fit to be masters. He saw the relationship between a slave and their master as resembling the relationship between a father and a child, and the law in the southern states as effectively preventing mistreatment. Black people, he argued, were useless "when isolated or separated from the white man", and free black people were in his view "destined to extinction"; slavery, in his view, was beneficial to the "civilization, progress, and general welfare of both races." To abolish slavery would, in his view, be cruel to black people who were the equivalent of "children forever" and "incapable of comprehending the wants of the future".

Nonetheless, Van Evrie did not believe that slavery would expand into Kansas, Nebraska, or the region north of the Ohio River, as these areas possessed climates "utterly uncongenial to the Negro constitution." He also believed that slavery would not survive in the northernmost slave states because white workers would emigrate to them. As a result, he argued that the South required an "outlet" for its excess black population, which would be produced through the expansion of slavery into the American tropics. He envisioned a slave society in the Caribbean, in which white people would live in the highlands and black people on the coast, and emphasized the importance of Cuba, which he demanded be seized by the U.S. before its slaves were emancipated by the Spanish colonial authorities.

=== Language ===
Van Evrie dedicated chapters in both Negroes and Negro "Slavery" and White Supremacy and Negro Subordination to establishing linguistic differences between white and black people; in the words of Amy Dunham Strand his arguments in this area "unambiguously [associated] language with racial essence." He claimed that black people possessed distinctive "vocal organs", leading to a "difference in language"; and that "the voice of the negro, both in its [physical] tones and its [grammatical] structure, varies just as widely from that of the white man as any other feature or faculty of the negro being." This difference, in Van Evrie's view, was so pronounced as to ensure that no black person could ever "speak the language of the white man with absolute correctness." He likened the difference between black and white speech to that between the calls of different animals, and argued that black people could only speak English at all because of an extraordinary "imitative instinct". Van Evrie saw this capacity to imitate white people as black people's "most essential feature". Van Evrie believed that in the absence of white people, black people would regress to their "native Africanism". Because all black language was for Van Evrie an imitation of white people's speech, he also believed black people to be incapable of producing music: "Music is to the Negro an impossible art, and therefore such a thing as a Negro singer is unknown."

=== Abolitionism and abolition ===
Van Evrie called abolitionism "free negroism". He wrote that abolitionists believed "that the negro is...a creature like ourselves except in color", which he rejected as a "foolish assumption". He considered anti-slavery sentiment to be a delusion derived from "European aristocrats who by holding up the imaginary wrongs to American slaves diverted attention from their own mistreatment of the white working class." He thought that abolition of slavery would result in black people being forced into unfair competition with whites, and that such an experiment would lead to the collapse of American democracy. He expected that after emancipation black people would live off white people's labor, increase taxes by becoming dependent on social programs, and push up commodity prices by refusing to work. He also believed that abolition would result in miscegenation on a larger scale, and accused abolitionists of promoting miscegenation. Shortly after the assassination of Abraham Lincoln he denounced an alleged abolitionist plot to disenfranchise white people in the South while enfranchising the black population.

=== White people ===
Van Evrie believed that the greatness of the United States could be attributed to the fact that its white peoples had mixed with one another while refusing to mix with black or Native people. He believed that the English settlers of the Colony of Virginia had valued class distinctions and believed some white men to be superior to others, but their contact with black people had led them to realize how alike and naturally superior they collectively were. This consciousness, Van Evrie argued, had given rise to the egalitarian ideas of the Revolutionary era.

His belief in the necessity of slavery was set against a critique of class privilege and social stratification in homogeneous white societies, including the perceived oppression of the working class and peasantry by the aristocracy in the United Kingdom, on grounds that the subordination of white people to other white people was unjust and "artificial". "The subordination of whites to whites," he wrote in the Day Book (then published as the Caucasian) in 1863, "is unjust and artificial. The English are ruled by those who are not naturally superior, while American democracy assures self-government of, by, and for naturally equal whites." He predicted that American ideas of equality would topple European despotisms, and condemned the oppression of the white working class by capitalists and their political allies in the northern United States. He feared that American civilization, which was defined by its adherence to the "natural" distinctions of race and not an artificial class hierarchy, was under threat not only from northern capitalists but also abolitionism, which he believed to be a monarchist plot originating in England. Fredrickson interpreted Van Evrie's Jacksonian rhetoric as being "calculated to appeal to socially insecure whites in search of a compensatory foundation for personal pride and status ... He appealed to the psychological needs of such whites by asserting that all Caucasians had natural capacities that were literally identical—as did all Negroes, on a much lower level."

He believed that white immigrants to the United States had distinctive physiognomical features (for example "The coarse skin, big hands and feet, the broad teeth, pug nose etc. of the Irish and German laborer") but that these characteristics would fade over time as immigrants became indistinguishable from other Americans. Black people, though, were bound in Van Evrie's view to remain "as absolutely and specifically unlike the American as when the race first touched the soil and first breathed the air of the New World." By the 1860s he also came to view Irish immigrants as an important part of a pro-slavery coalition in the North.

=== Multiracial people and miscegenation ===
Van Evrie viewed white attitudes towards multiracial people as a central issue in the debate over slavery; his Negroes and Negro "Slavery" repeatedly warns of the dangers of "mongrelism". Because he viewed racial distinctions as "impassable" and racial categories as having immutable essences, he viewed miscegenation as a violation of nature. He held that "Mulattoism is an abnormalism—a disease" that left multiracial people "mercifully doomed to final extinction", and believed miscegenation to be "the most loathsome and most hideous of social miseries." Mixed people, he believed, were responsible for almost all crime and racial disorder and suffered a "diminishing vitality" and a "tendency to disease and disorganization", which Van Evrie called "muleism". "The nation," he feared, "weighed down by mulattoism ... would doubtless fall a conquest to some other nation or variety of the master race," and be colonized by Britain or another European power. He explained that the children of mixed couples "could no more exist beyond a given period than any other physical degeneration, no more than tumors, cancers or other abnormal growths or physical disease can become permanent." In Negroes and Negro "Slavery" Van Evrie sought to prove that the descendants of mixed couples become infertile after the fourth generation, a contention he borrowed from Nott. This eventual sterility ensured that mixed people would never be "of sufficient amount to threaten the safety or even disturb the peace of Southern society." In White Supremacy and Negro Subordination Van Evrie argued that "whites who abdicate their manhood [by having sex with black people] ... must be punished to even a greater extent than their hapless victims."

In Black Scare, his history of American racism in the late 20th century, Forrest G. Wood noted a central contradiction in Van Evrie's ideas about race: he believed simultaneously that mixing would lead to a race of people carrying characteristics of each race, and that it would lead to the decline of black characteristics in favor of white characteristics. Wood notes that Van Evrie was among a number of critics who did not think "it important to explain how race mixing reduced the offspring to the lowest common denominator on the one hand and raised the mulatto to a level approaching the white man's on the other."

Wood attributed Van Evrie and his contemporaries' opposition to miscegenation to two factors: concern for the perceived purity of white women, and fear that the white race would be diminished. Van Evrie believed that the "delicate" nature of white women in the South was the result of traditional southern attitudes toward race relations, that love across the racial divide was "eternally impossible," and that southern white women believed their "degradation and debauchment" to be the objective of the Union in the American Civil War. In 1983, literary critic Eric Sundquist wrote that Van Evrie had "anticipated ... the hysterical defense of southern womanhood that would become and remain the touchstone of white racism".

=== Indigenous people ===
Van Evrie believed the brains of the indigenous peoples of the Americas to be larger than those of black people but smaller than whites'. He argued that the past civilizations in Central and South America could not have been the work of Native people who lacked the brain size to be capable of migration, and were instead evidence that white people had inhabited the Americas earlier than previously thought, and had later migrated elsewhere.

=== The Democratic Party ===
Though Van Evrie was closely allied with the Democratic Party, during the Civil War he criticized his fellow Copperheads for their perceived failure to offer alternative political principles. In 1865 Van Evrie in the Weekly Day Book accused the New York World, a Democratic paper, of being secretly run by Republicans, and of claiming to be a Copperhead paper in order to embarrass Democrats. He also claimed that the World's editor Manton Marble was an abolitionist. After the war he called for the formation of a Democratic equivalent to the Republican Party's Union League.

== Publications ==
=== Weekly Day Book (1848–1879) ===
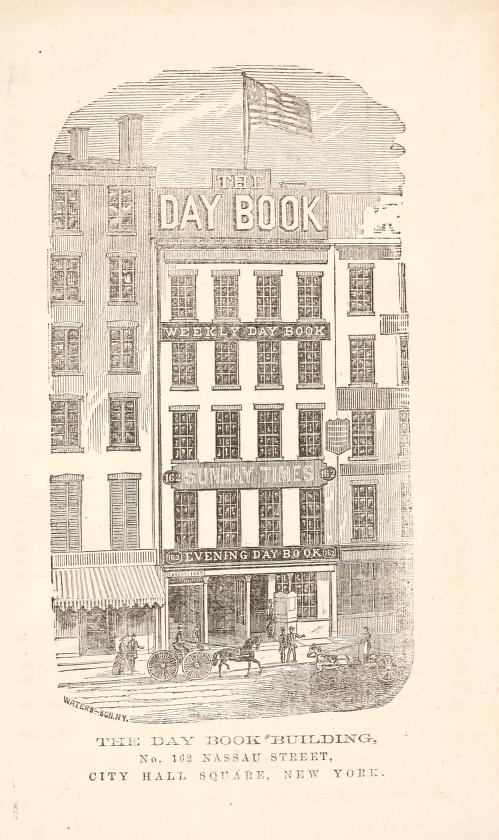
Headquarters of the Weekly Day Book, depicted in the back matter of the third edition of Negroes and Negro "Slavery"

Van Evrie was the proprietor of the Weekly Day Book, a newspaper which primarily existed to propagate white supremacist ideas. The Day Book's editorial policy, printed in its masthead, was "White Men Must Rule America." During the civil war, the front page of the Day Book carried the quotation "I hold that this government was made on the white basis, by white men, for the benefit of white men and their posterity forever", words spoken by Stephen A. Douglas in the first of the Lincoln–Douglas debates of 1858.

The Day Book began publication in 1848 and briefly opposed slavery before changing its allegiances. Van Evrie edited the newspaper in the 1850s and early 1860s, in which time he gave his backing to John C. Breckinridge in the 1860 presidential election, supported the policies of President James Buchanan in its immediate aftermath, opposed the Crittenden Compromise and urged adherence to Dred Scott v. Sandford. In 1856 the Day Book reached the attention of future President Abraham Lincoln, whose notes for a speech showed he intended to read out and ridicule a clipping from the newspaper. From October 1861 to October 1863 the paper was published under the name The Caucasian. The Day Book opposed all efforts to improve the conditions of black people and sought "the utter rout, overthrow and extermination of Abolitionism from American soil." Van Evrie also used the newspaper to advertise his own publications.

The Day Book focused especially on developing Copperheadism among New York's working class, in particular Irish immigrants. It stirred up tensions among Irish Americans by claiming that the Republican Party would pursue policies benefitting black people at the expense of white immigrants. Wood described the Day Book as "New York City's rabid racist newspaper" and wrote that it "made the arousal of its excitable Irish readers almost an editorial policy." Wood also argued that appeals such as Van Evrie's played a role in race riots including the New York City draft riots of 1863.

In 1864, after U.S. Representative Samuel S. Cox delivered a speech denouncing miscegenation, the Day Book attacked Cox for paying lip service to the idea of abolition. Van Evrie argued that abolition would necessarily lead to "the mixing of blood" and that opposition to slavery necessarily meant support for "amalgamating with negroes." The Day Book later backtracked, explaining "we doubt not [that Cox] really means to be a Democrat." The same year, in response to a long leaflet published by the Democrats' Central Campaign Committee, Van Evrie, feeling that political texts "should be short, pithy and pointed", published his "Campaign Broadside No. 1—The Miscegenation Record of the Republican Party". The "Campaign Broadside" exhumed provocative arguments put forth in "Miscegenation" and linked them to Lincoln.

Though the Day Book was outspoken, its political influence was minimal: Van Evrie did not represent the Democratic Party, nor did he endorse candidates for office; the Day Book, as a weekly publication, did not publish as great a volume of invective as Copperhead dailies, and had frequent financial difficulties. The Day Book ceased publication in 1879.

=== Negroes and Negro "Slavery" (1853) ===
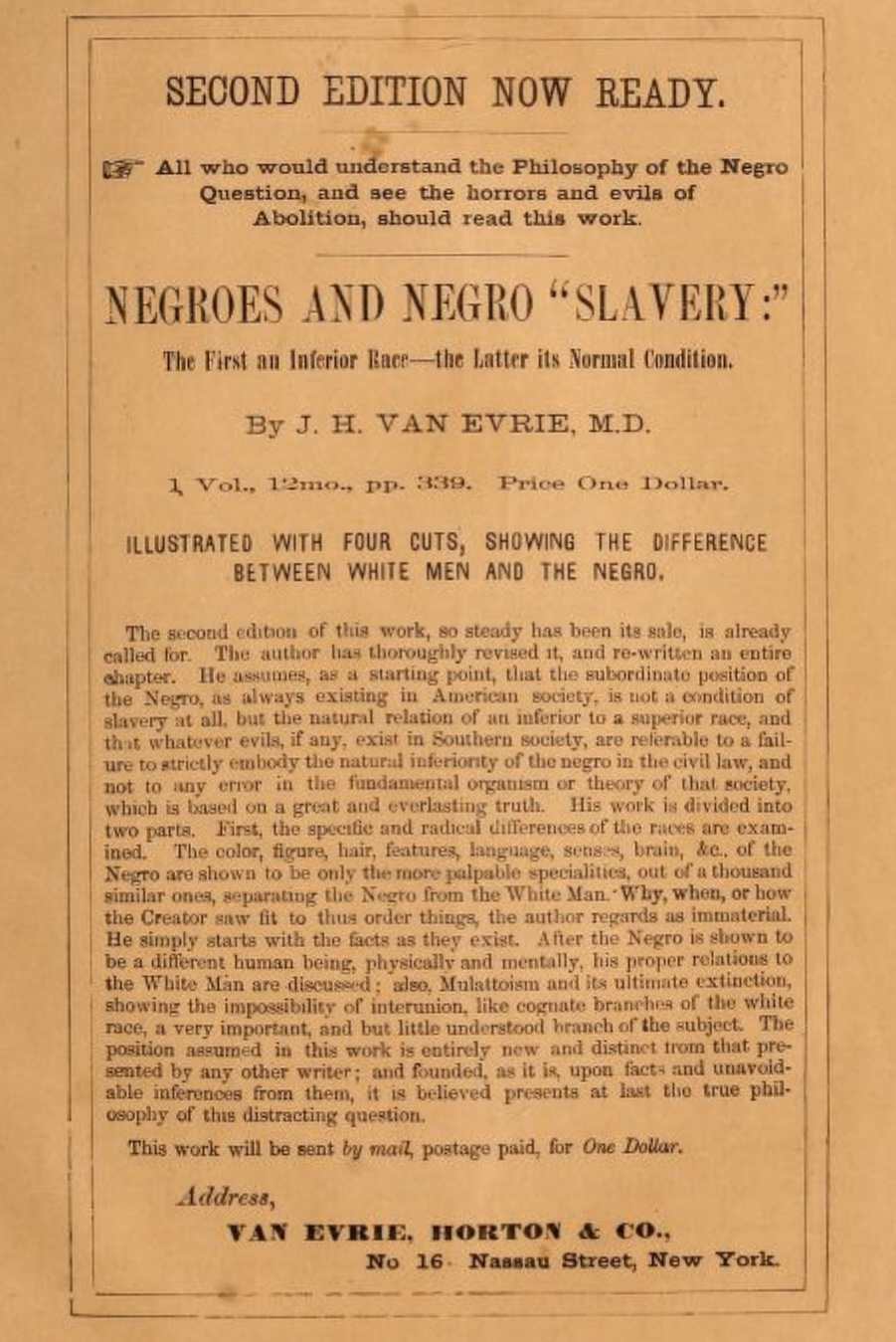
Advertisement for 2nd edition of Negroes and Negro "Slavery", by John H. Van Evrie

Negroes and Negro "Slavery": The First an Inferior Race; the Latter Its Normal Condition was first published as a pamphlet in 1853 and reprinted in 1854. Described by Kaplan as Van Evrie's "magnum opus", Negroes and Negro "Slavery" was expanded into a book in 1861 and 1863. With its publication Van Evrie hoped to incite "The White Men of America", especially those of the working class, to resist any alteration to the racial status quo. Van Evrie's methodology involved examinations of multiple body parts leading toward the conclusions outlined in the subtitle. He contended that black people's skin was incapable of expressing emotion to the same extent as that of white people; that black people were incapable of performing music; that black people's fingers, brains, and nervous system lacked sensitivity but that they were overly sensitive in other areas; and that black people's physiology (specifically the balance between the head and body) was such that, in the words of William H. Tucker, "education would make it literally impossible for [them] to stand on their feet." Van Evrie viewed education for black people as an unnatural exertion which would result in bodies "dwarfed or destroyed". Alongside these physical characteristics, he cited animals' perceived different reactions to humans of different races, and allegedly differing brain sizes, as a justification for slavery and white supremacy (see also Phrenology and Neuroscience and intelligence § Brain size). The pamphlet version carried the endorsements of Jefferson Davis and J. D. B. De Bow. Van Evrie argued that the pamphlet had made a "profound impression" due to the "novelty" of its demonstration that truths about race had been "thrust out of sight by the mental dictation of the enemies of American institutions."

In her 2008 book Black Frankenstein, the literary critic Elizabeth Young argued that "monster metaphors" echoing the language of Mary Shelley's Frankenstein are a recurring theme in Negroes and Negro "Slavery", for example in Van Evrie's fear of "monstrous admixture" and his description of mixed children as "wretched progeny". Young reads Van Evrie's fears that abolition would result in miscegenation and that the products of miscegenation would become infertile as representing a fear that the United States would become "a nation of self-extinguishing monsters."

=== Subgenation (1864) ===
In December 1863 a booklet entitled Miscegenation: The Theory of the Blending of the Races, Applied to the American White Man and Negro, advocating relationships between white and black people, was published anonymously. While the author appeared to be an overzealous Republican, it was in fact the work of two racists seeking to discredit the Republican Party.

In response, Van Evrie published a new edition of Negroes and Negro "Slavery" entitled Subgenation: The Theory of the Normal Relation of the Races and subtitled An Answer to "Miscegenation". Kaplan described "Subgenation" as "basically the old text with specific argument re ['Miscegenation'] thrown in." The style and format of "Subgenation" mimicked that of "Miscegenation". The title referred to "the natural or normal relation of an inferior to a superior race." In "Subjenation" Van Evrie declared racial inequality to be "the cornerstone of American Democracy and the vital principle of American civilization and human progress"; and asserted that the argument of "Miscegenation" was fatally undermined by Biblical proof that black and white people were not of the same species. He also argued that thousands of northern Democrats, including Cox and Clement Vallandigham believed in the doctrine of subgenation, but lacked "the courage to say it." The neologism "subgenation" (or "subjenation") was the result of an effort by Van Evrie and George Fitzhugh to create a new vocabulary for the emerging field of sociology. "Subgenation" was republished in 1866.

=== Abolition is National Death (1866) ===
After the civil war Van Evrie revised and reissued an earlier publication entitled Abolition and Secession under the new title Abolition is National Death as part of a series of anti-abolition tracts. In this text he argued that the transformation of slaves into citizens had dire implications for both the white race and the United States as a nation, as it would lead to racial conflict resembling that seen in the Haitian Revolution. Van Evrie predicted that this conflict would lead to black people becoming extinct in majority-white areas and white people vanishing in areas where black people were the majority: parts of the country would "become what Hayti is now, and as utterly lost to American civilization as if swallowed up by an earthquake." This was to be the "final end, the unavoidable result, the inexorable necessity, the unescapable doom of the American people."

=== White Supremacy and Negro Subordination (1868) ===
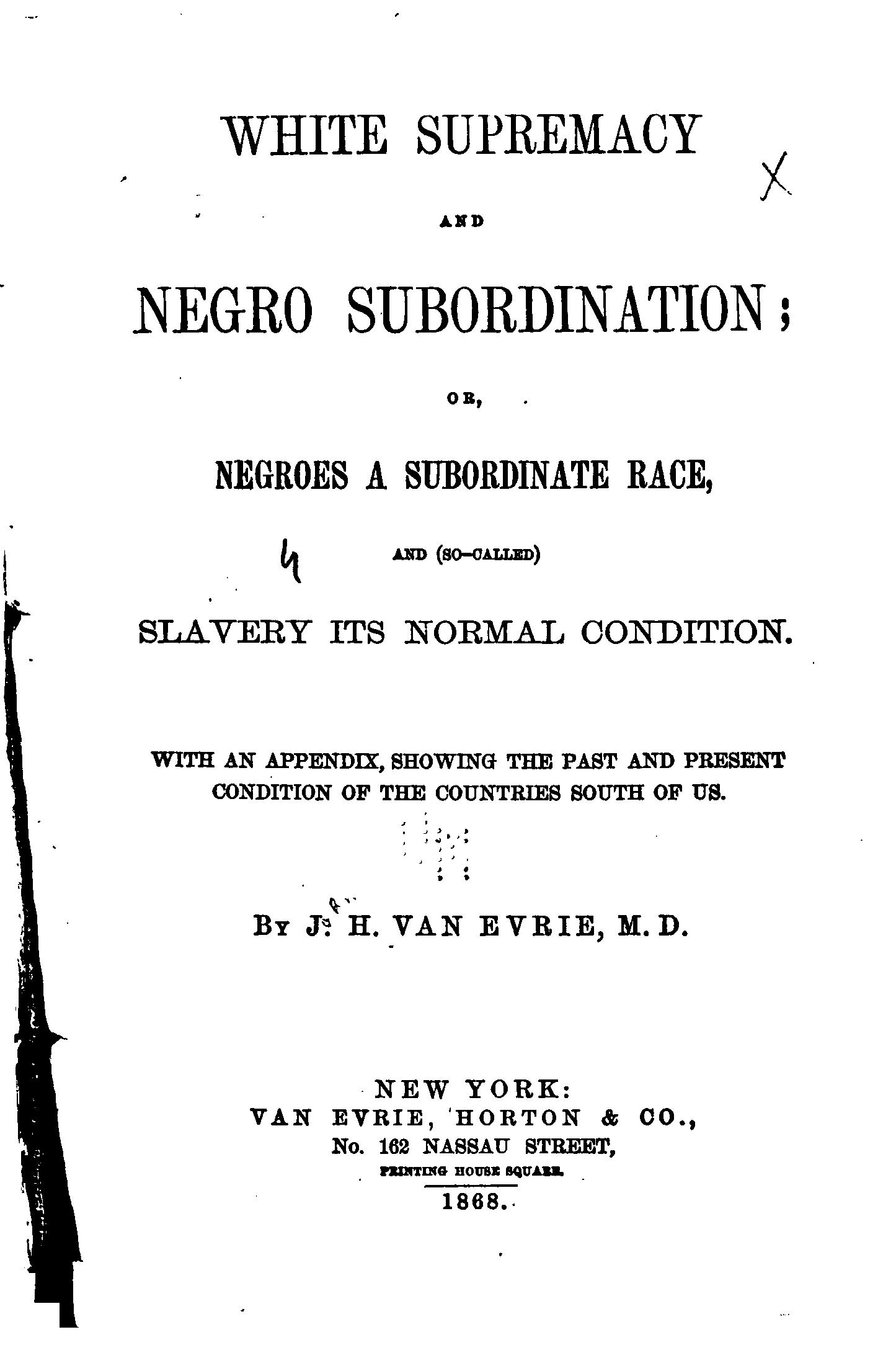
Title page of the 1868 edition of White Supremacy and Negro Subordination

In 1867 Negroes and Negro "Slavery", stripped of references to miscegenation and "subgenation", was republished as White Supremacy and Negro Subordination or, Negroes A Subordinate Race and Slavery Its Normal Condition. The stated intention of the 1868 edition was to demonstrate "that the so-called slavery of the South was the Negro's normal or natural condition". Van Evrie also sought to capitalize on white opposition to the Fourteenth Amendment to the United States Constitution, which granted civil rights to black people. White Supremacy and Negro Subordination focuses on white supremacy's paternalistic aspects. Here Van Evrie argues that black people possessed "wonderful imitative powers" and that the role of the slaveowner was primarily to set "a proper example". Van Evrie cites craniometry, physical anthropology, comparative anatomy and biological determinism in support of his argument that slaves were absolutely dependent on their masters. In White Supremacy and Negro Subordination Van Evrie also cited black people's perceived inability to grow beards and the "absolute resemblance" allegedly shared by all black people as further justification for slavery. The book also features several chapters detailing alleged similarities between black people and animals, and a preface in which Van Evrie lamented that Northerners "now rule the South by military force ... and are striving to 'reconstruct' American society on a Mongrel basis" (see Reconstruction Era).

=== Other publications ===
Van Evrie's "Free Negroism" was first published as the introduction to a book in the 1850s and later reproduced as a pamphlet published in five editions between 1862 and 1866, as well as in Lindley Spring's The Negro at Home. Excerpts were also reprinted in Democratic newspapers. In 1860 Van Evrie published a pamphlet edition of the Dred Scott decision, with a preface contending that the Supreme Court had found that the Declaration of Independence applied only to white people, and thus that it had "fixed the status of the subordinate race forever." The pamphlet included only the opinion of Chief Justice Roger B. Taney, which Van Evrie declared to be "the most momentous event that has ever occurred on this continent" with the exception of the Declaration of Independence, and also featured an essay by the physician Samuel A. Cartwright emphasizing skull measurements as a sign of racial inferiority, comparing black people to orangutans and monkeys, and expressing a belief in the Curse of Ham. The Old Guard, a Monthly Journal Dedicated to the Principles of 1776 and 1787, edited by Charles Chauncey Burr, was published by Van Evrie, Horton & Company starting in 1862. Like the Day Book, The Old Guard maintained a focus on politics, in particular advocacy of white supremacy. In 1863 Van Evrie, Horton & Company published Cox's "Puritanism in Politics".

The series of anti-abolition tracts of which Abolition is National Death was part also included The Six Species of Men (1866) and The Abolition Conspiracy. The sixth of the Anti-Abolition Tracts, entitled "Soliloquies", featured a parody of a "political preacher", in which Van Evrie accused antislavery clergy of replacing the teachings of Christ with their own politics by creating a fictional minister who "forsook Christ and took up politics ... And I taught people to hate each other. And ... I preached the negro and Abolitionism instead of Christ and salvation." Also in 1866, Van Evrie published an unsigned pamphlet alongside a series of drawings intended to illustrate white superiority. Two years later the same piece was serialized under Van Evrie's name in The Old Guard. In 1868, Van Evrie's Democratic Alamanac devoted 20 pages to reprinting Bryan Edwards's narrative of the Haitian Revolution in an attempt to prove that the same "means and agencies" that had fomented the rebellion in Haiti were at work in the Republican Party. In the 1870s Van Evrie continued to advertise and distribute his own pamphlets under the title "The White Man's Political Library." James Hunt's pamphlet "On the Negro's Place in Nature" was published in the United States by Van Evrie.

== Influence ==
Van Evrie's thought influenced the work of the writer Edward A. Pollard. After abolition Pollard had ceased to support slavery on grounds of tradition or paternalism, and turned instead to Van Evrie's theories of black biological inferiority, and endorsed Van Evrie's assertion that white democracy required total black subordination. He was also cited as an authority by Hinton Rowan Helper in his The Negroes in Negroland; the Negroes in America; and Negroes Generally. In 2010 the historian James Lander wrote that Van Evrie "may have achieved his stated desire to influence politicians rather than scientists." Van Evrie claimed that Stephen A. Douglas had distributed copies of Negroes and Negro "Slavery" among his constituents, and described Douglas as one politician who had "assented to the new doctrine in private, but declined the responsibility of standing by the truth in public". He also claimed to have converted Alexander H. Stephens to "the new doctrine" by presenting him with a copy of Negroes and Negro "Slavery".

In a 1934 article H. G. Duncan and Winnie Leach Duncan noted that Van Evrie aided the development of sociology "by becoming a source and inspiration for [George] Fitzhugh." Fitzhugh wrote a ten-page review of Negroes and Negro "Slavery" in which he argued that Van Evrie had provided "demonstrative reasoning, demonstrative proof, that the negro is of a different species, physically, from the white man ... he has demonstrated that the negro is physically, morally, and intellectually a different being (from necessity) from the white man, and must ever so remain". He also wrote that Van Evrie's thesis that "The negro is not a black-white-man" constituted "a new discovery and a new and important theory in physiological and sociological science."

In The Leopard's Spots, his 1960 book on 19th-century scientific racism, the historian William Stanton described Van Evrie as one "whom appeared only on the periphery of the controversy to comment, cheer, or make impolite noises of disapproval" and wrote that he "did not influence the tide of [the] battle" over polygenism and monogenism. In 1998, historian Matthew Frye Jacobson wrote that Van Evrie's "contribution to the scientific discourse of race involved not substance but simply volume."

== See also ==
- Louis Agassiz (1807–1873), Swiss-born theorist of polygenism who worked in the United States
- Thomas Dixon Jr. (1864–1946), America's second professional racist
- Rushmore G. Horton, Van Evrie's business partner
