= Felix Hollaender =

German writer

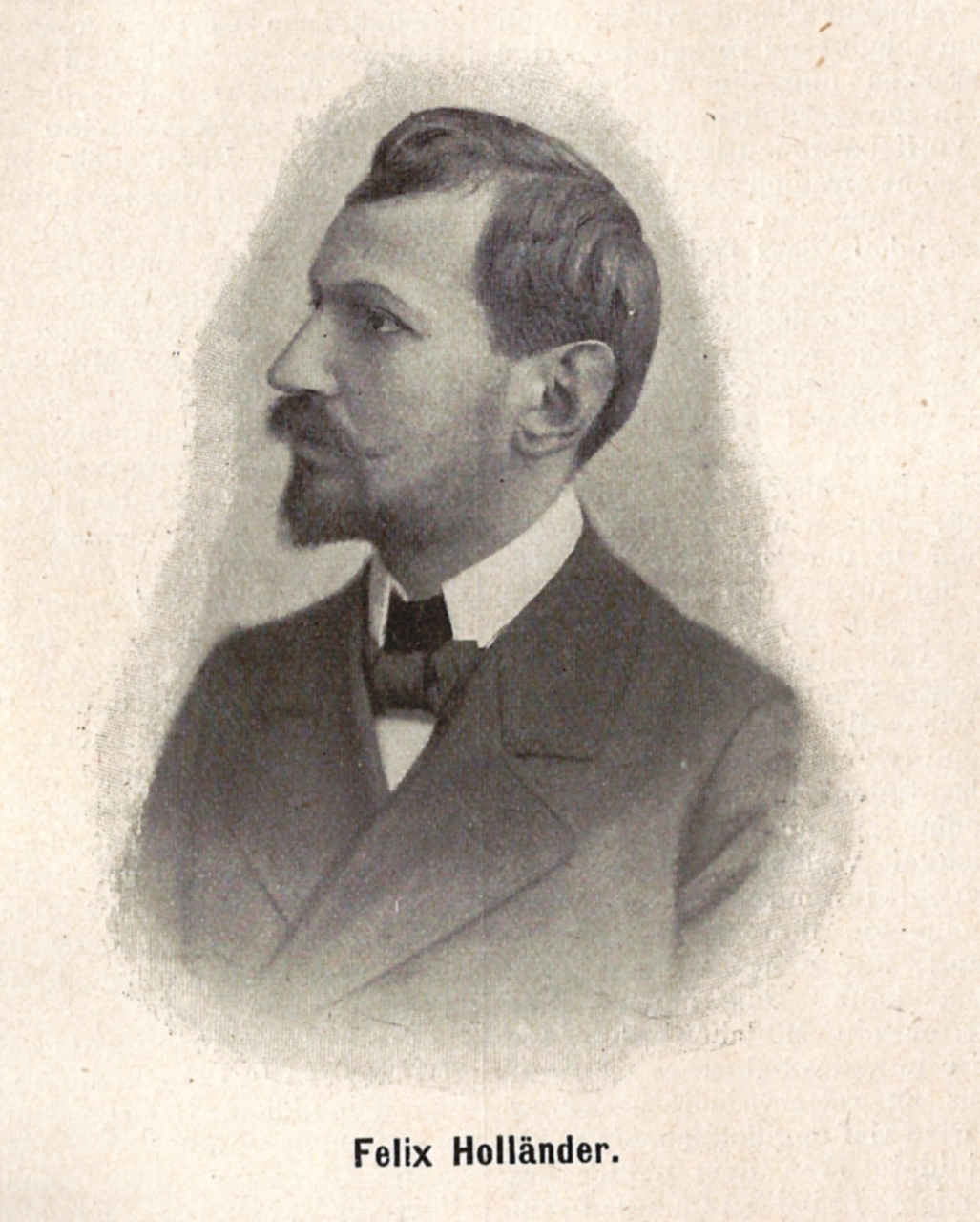
1903

Felix Hollaender (1 November 1867 – 29 May 1931) was a German writer, critic, dramaturge and theatre director. At one point he worked as a stage producer with his friend Max Reinhardt.

== Life ==
Felix Hollaender was born in Leobschütz (as Głubczyce was known before) 1945), a small town in the southern part of Lower Silesia then part of the Kingdom of Prussia. In that place Siegmund Hollaender (1824–1888), his father, worked as a physician. While he was still young his parents moved the family to Berlin where they believed (correctly, as matters turned out) that they would be able to give their sons a better education and future. The family was a musical one. His two older brothers were the conductor Gustav Hollaender (1855–1915) and the composer Victor Hollaender (1866–1940).

He spent his childhood in Berlin, where he attended school and in 1886 passed his Abitur (school final exams). While he was still at school his father, a man of wide cultural interests, successfully inculcated in him a rich knowledge of classical and contemporary literature. It was through his father's social connections that he met the distinguished critic and theatre manager Otto Brahm who became a strong influence. Other friends from his school days were Max Dessoir, Max Osborn and Theodor Wolff.

Hollaender studied at Berlin University where his teachers included Wilhelm Dilthey, Friedrich Paulsen, Erich Schmidt and Georg Simmel. He networked effortlessly, joining in the free-ranging discussions in the "Ethics clubs" ("Ethischen Clubs") in which students tried to create their new world visions. As a student he also cultivated good contacts in literary circles and with literary publications favouring the Naturalist movement. His own first novel, "Jesus und Judas", was published in 1891 during his first term at university. The commercial success of this and other early publications persuaded him to abandon his university studies in order "to travel and to write". Two years later, in 1894, he found it necessary to return to Berlin in order to try and secure his financial position, however.

With Adolf Damaschke and Alfred Ploetz, between 1896 and 1898 Hollaender worked as a co-producer and theatre critic of the recently launched Berlin weekly newspaper, Die Welt am Montag, identified in its tag-line as the "independent newspaper for politics and culture". Others who worked on the publication included Georg Bernhard, Kurt Eisner, Heinrich and Julius Hart, Alfred Kerr, Gustav Landauer, Samuel Lublinski and Franz Oppenheimer.

From 1902 Hollaender worked as a dramaturge, which from 1904 he combined with work as a stage producer with Max Reinhardt. An excellent friendship and working relationship between the two men came about. Between 1920 and 1923 he headed up the Deutsches Theater (Berlin). He continued with his writing and working as a critic on various publications, after 1923 becoming the theatre critic with the "8-Uhr-Abendblatt" (evening newspaper). He also became part of the influential Friedrichshagener Dichterkreis (literary circle).

== Personal ==
Felix Hollaender was married twice. His first marriage, in 1894, was to Johanna ____ and ended in divorce in 1913. His second marriage, in 1913/14, was to the actress Gina Meyer. The first marriage produced three sons and one daughter: the second produced another son.

One of the sons, Ulrich Hollaender (1915-1995), studied at Tübingen and later emigrated to England where he changed his name to Michael Thomas (in order to protect his family in Germany) and became a British army officer.

Felix Hollaender died on 29 May 1931 in Berlin, where his body is buried in the Friedhof Heerstraße (cemetery).

== Output (selection) ==
=== Novels ===
- Unser Haus. Roman. 1911 (autobiographical novel)
- Jesus und Judas. novel. 1891
- Magdalene Dornis. novel. 1892
- Das letzte Glück. novel. 1900
- Der Weg des Thomas Truck. novel. 1902
- The Oath of Stephan Huller. 1912
- Sturmwind im Westen (S. Fischer Verlag Berlin)
- Erlösung (S. Fischer Verlag Berlin)
- Traum und Tag (S. Fischer Verlag Berlin)
- Frau Ellin Röte. Ein Eheroman (S. Fischer Verlag Berlin)
- Charlotte Adutti. Ein Buch der Liebe (Ullstein & Co. Berlin/Wien)
- Pension Fratelli (Ullstein & Co. Berlin/Wien)
- Agnes Feustels Sohn (Ullstein & Co. Berlin/Wien)
- Die Witwe (Ullstein & Co. Berlin/Wien)

=== Stage dramas ===
- Die heilige Ehe. 1892 (jointly with Hans Land)
- Katzengold. Schauspiel. 1890
- Ackermann. Tragikomödie. 1903 (jointly with Lothar Schmidt).

=== Libretti ===
- Die fromme Helene. Operetta (jointly with Arthur Kahane). Music: Friedrich Hollaender and others, 1923 Berlin

=== Filmscripts ===
The novel Der Eid des Stephan Huller was filmed several times. The best known version internationally appeared in 1925.

- 1912: The Oath of Stephan Huller (director: Viggo Larsen), with Viggo Larsen
- 1921: The Oath of Stephan Huller (director: Reinhard Bruck), with Carl de Vogt
- 1925: Varieté (director: Ewald André Dupont), with Emil Jannings and Lya de Putti
- 1935: Variety (director: Nicolas Farkas), with Hans Albers, Annabella and Attila Hörbiger (Hollaender was Jewish and died in 1931. The National Socialists took power in 1933 and remained in charge for twelve years: Felix Hollaender was not identified as the script author.)
- 1935: Variétés (Regie: Nicolas Farkas), with Jean Gabin, Annabella and Fernand Gravey (Hollaender was Jewish and died in 1931. The National Socialists took power in 1933 and remained in charge for twelve years: Felix Hollaender was not identified as the script author.)
- 1936: Three Maxims (director: Herbert Wilcox), mit Anna Neagle (Hollaender was Jewish and died in 1931. The National Socialists took power in 1933 and remained in charge for twelve years: Felix Hollaender was not identified as the script author)
- 1954: Three from Variety (director: Kurt Neumann), with Ingrid Andree
