= The Oath of Stephan Huller =

The Oath of Stephan Huller may refer to:

- The Oath of Stephan Huller (novel), 1912 novel by Felix Hollaender
- The Oath of Stephan Huller (1912 film), German film based on the novel
- The Oath of Stephan Huller (1921 film), German film based on the novel
