= Nixchen =

Nixchen may refer to:

- Nixchen (1926 film), a German silent film
- Nixchen (1920 film), a German silent film
