= Paul Lieberenz =

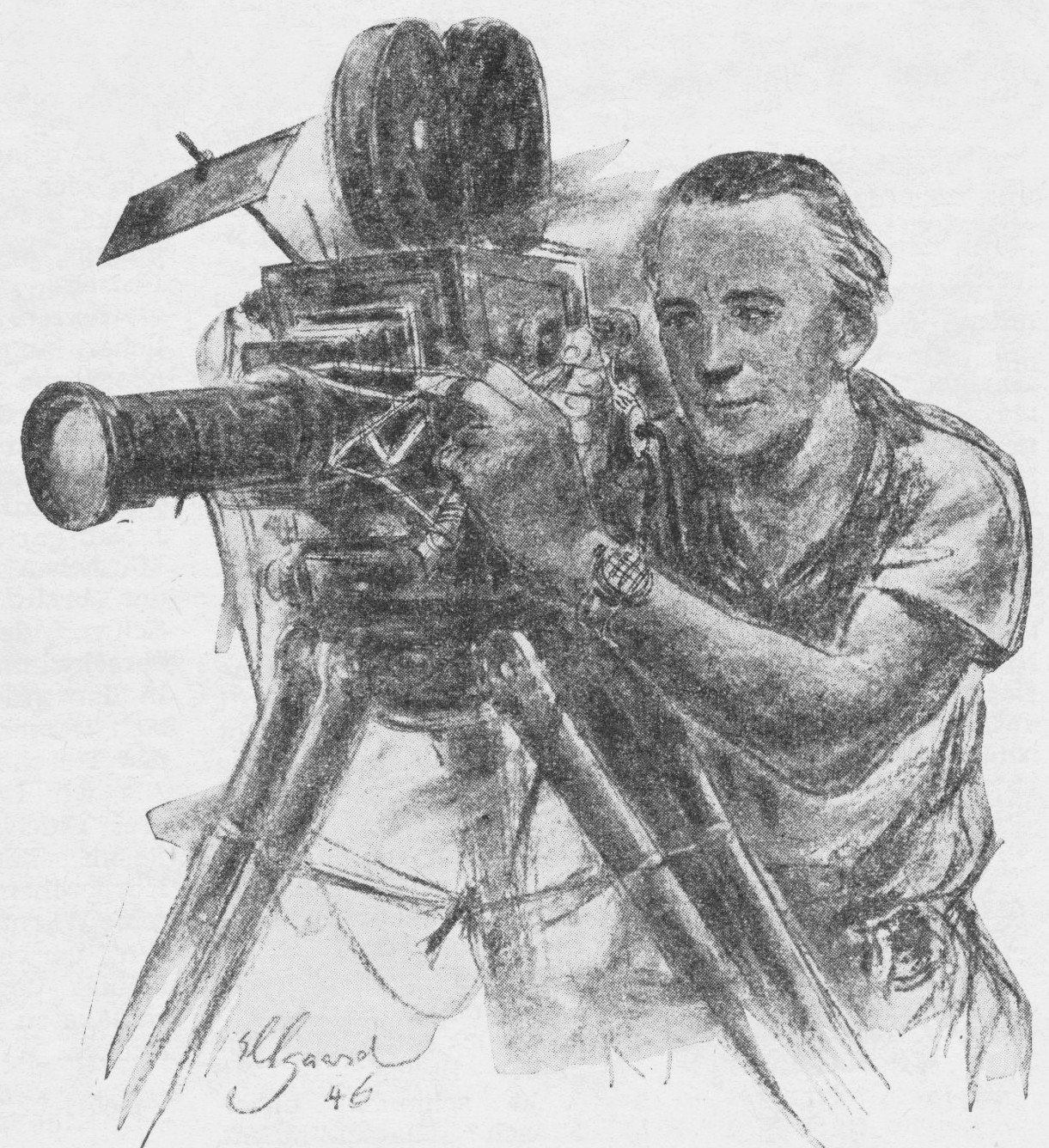
Lieberenz sketched by Helmuth Ellgaard in 1946

Paul Lieberenz (13 February 1893 – 31 August 1954) was a German documentary film maker who travelled around the world to make films on travel and exploration. He documented the Sven Hedin expedition into the Gobi desert and worked with Hans Schomburgk in Africa. He was also involved in making propaganda films for the Nazi government. His wife Gerti Lieberenz was also a collaborator and they ran the Lieberenz Film Produktion company in Berlin.

== Life and work ==
Lieberenz worked in the studios of Oskar Meßter before joining Hans Schomburgk to film an expedition into Liberia in 1923. He later collaborated with Lutz Heck (on an animal catching expedition into Abyssinia titled Auf Tierfang in Abessinien, 1926). His expedition into the Gobi desert with Sven Hedin was produced as Mit Sven Hedin durch Asiens Wüsten (1929). He worked as a cameraman for Leni Riefenstahl on Triumph des Willens (1935). In 1937 he made two documentary film on a women's school in Rendsburg, and another on the colonial school in Witzenhausen for the propaganda division of the Third Reich. Other propaganda films included Deutsche Kulturarbeit in Kamerun (1935) and Deutsche Kamerun-Bananen (1938). In 1941 he made an ethnographic film Urwaldszwerge in Zentralafrika. In 1957 he was involved in making a travel film on South America and the Easter Island along with Bodo Fischer. Another ethnographic film was Bantu weiss nichts von Europa (1936). He also made films for the Catholic missions such as Kreuz über Afrika (1935) and Deutsche Pioniere in der Südsee (1935). He later wrote a book on his film-making in Abenteuer mit der Filmkamera (1946).
