= The Dancer (1919 film) =

- Directed by: Carl Froelich
- Written by: Felix Hollaender
- Starring: Lil Dagover
- Release date: 1919
- Country: Germany
- Languages: Silent; German intertitles

The Dancer (German: Der Tänzer) is a 1919 German silent film directed by Carl Froelich and starring Lil Dagover.

== Cast ==
In alphabetical order

- Irmgard Bern
- Theodor Burghardt
- Lil Dagover
- Maria Forescu
- Hugo Froelich
- Walter Janssen as Der Tänzer
- Ria Jende
- Adolf Klein
- Klein-Meinhardt
- Eugen Klöpfer
- Margarete Kupfer
- Aenderly Lebius
- Ena Mar
- Frida Richard
- Margarete Schön
- Gertrude Welcker

== Bibliography ==
- Hans-Michael Bock and Tim Bergfelder. The Concise Cinegraph: An Encyclopedia of German Cinema. Berghahn Books.
