= Schomburgk =

Schomburgk is a surname. Notable people with the surname include:

- Robert Hermann Schomburgk (1804–1865), German-born explorer for Great Britain in the nineteenth century (whose botanical abbreviation is R.H.Schomb.)
- Moritz Richard Schomburgk (1811–1891), his brother, director of the Adelaide Botanic Garden (whose botanical abbreviation is M.R.Schomb.)
- Hans Schomburgk (1880–1967), German explorer and filmmaker
- Heinrich Schomburgk (1885–1965), German tennis player
- John Richard Schomburgk Evans, Australian architect in practice with F. Kenneth Milne 1920–1930

== See also ==
- Schomburgkia a genus of orchids
