= Hansi Burg =

German actress (1898–1975)

Hansi Burg (born Wilhelmine Alexandrine Hansi Antoinette Hirschburg; 12 February 1898 – 14 March 1975) was an Austrian-born German stage and film actress.

She was born in Vienna as the daughter of Eugen Burg, a leading German actor. She took up professional acting in 1917, appearing mostly on stage but also in several silent films.

Burg became known for her long-term relationship with the film star Hans Albers, whom she met while they were acting together. The Nazi Propaganda Minister Joseph Goebbels forced them to split up because she was Jewish, although they remained in secret contact. During the Second World War, she lived in exile in Britain. She returned in 1945 and settled down to live with Albers again. Her father died in the Theresienstadt concentration camp. Burg died in Garatshausen, Feldafing municipality in 1975 and is buried at the Alter Friedhof in Tutzing, Bavaria.

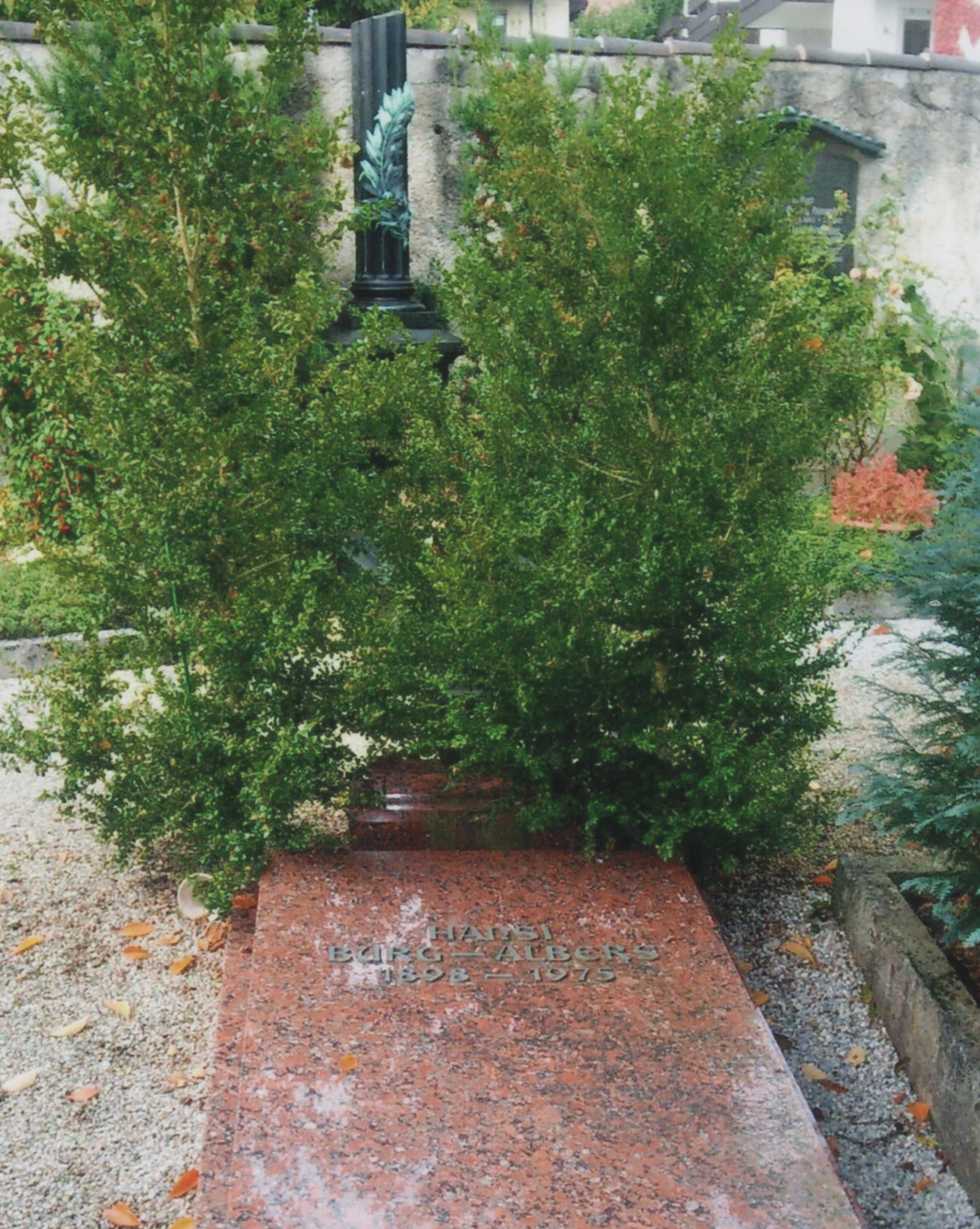
Hansi Burg's grave at the Alter Friedhof in Tutzing, Bavaria.

== Filmography ==
- Mutter Erde (1919)
- Abenteuer der Bianetti (1919)
- The Girl from Acker Street (1920)
- Der unsichtbare Dieb (1920)

== Bibliography ==
- Burleigh, Michael (2001) [2000]. The Third Reich: A New History. New York: Hill and Wang. ISBN 978-0-8090-9326-7.
- Hardt, Ursula (1996). From Caligari to California: Erich Pommer's Life in the International Film Wars. Providence: Berghahn Books. ISBN 978-1-57181-930-7.
- Kosta, Barbara (2009). Willing Seduction: The Blue Angel, Marlene Dietrich and Mass Culture. New York: Berghahn Books. ISBN 978-0-85745-619-9.
- Manvell, Roger; Fraenkel, Heinrich (2010) [1956]. Doctor Goebbels: His Life and Death. New York: Skyhorse Publishing. ISBN 978-1-61608-029-7.
