= Variety (1925 film) =

1925 film directed by Ewald Andre Dupont

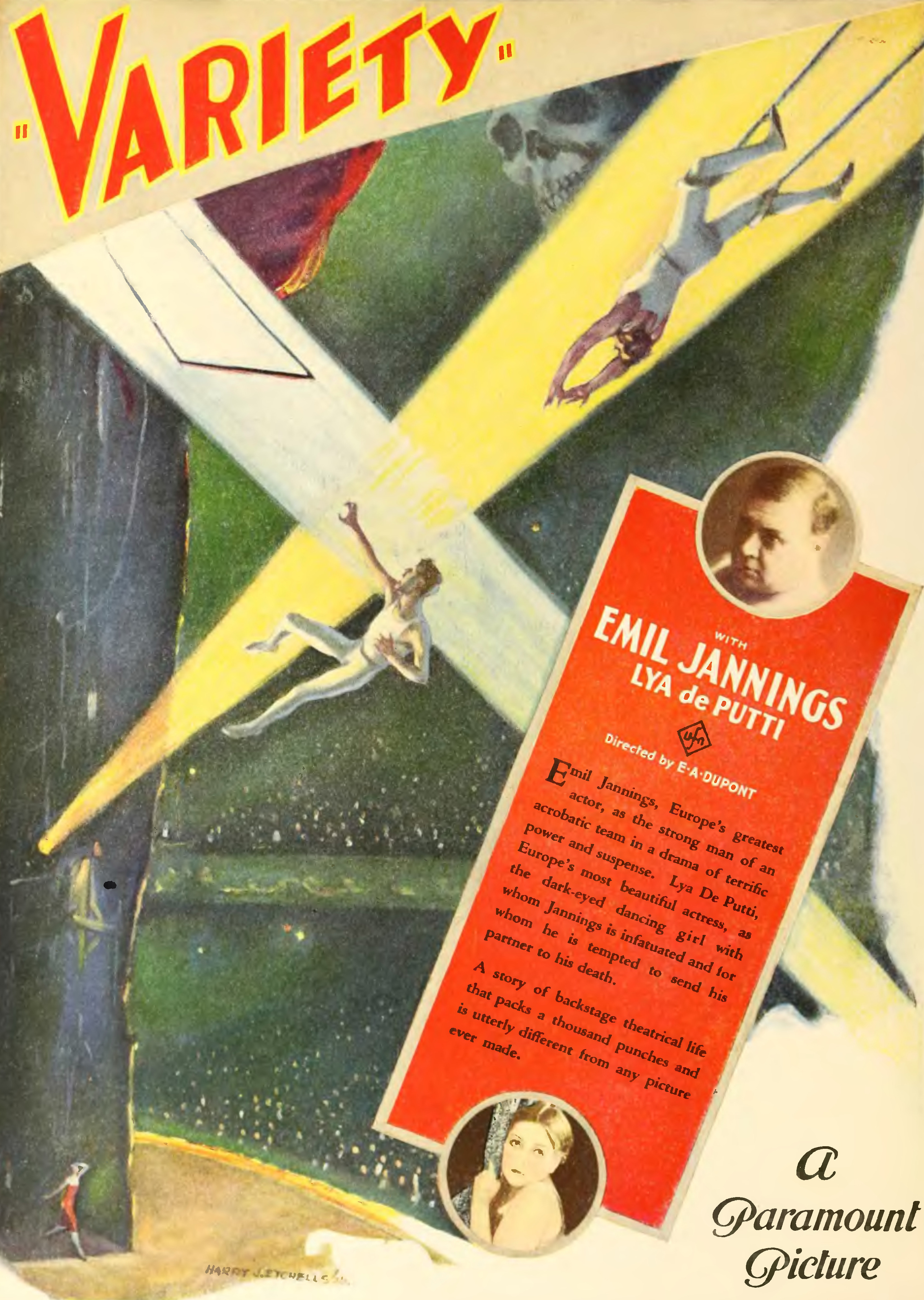
- Directed by: Ewald Andre Dupont
- Written by: Screenwriter: Ewald Andre Dupont; Leo Birinski
- Based on: The Oath of Stephan Huller by Felix Hollaender
- Produced by: Erich Pommer
- Starring: Emil Jannings; Lya de Putti; Maly Delschaft; Warwick Ward
- Cinematography: Karl W. Freund; Carl Hoffmann
- Distributed by: UFA (Germany); Paramount Pictures (US)
- Release date: 16 November 1925 (Germany)
- Running time: 95 minutes
- Country: Germany
- Languages: Silent film; German intertitles

Variety (German: Varieté [ˌvaʀi̯eˈte], also known by the alternative titles Jealousy or Vaudeville) is a 1925 German silent drama film directed by Ewald Andre Dupont based on the 1912 novel The Oath of Stephan Huller by Felix Hollaender.

The trapeze scenes are set in the Berlin Wintergarten theatre. The camera swings from long shot to close-up, like the acrobats.

The story was loosely remade by Dupont as the 1931 German sound film Salto Mortale.

== Plot ==
Variety (1925)

In the film, Jannings portrays "Boss Huller", a former trapeze artist who was badly injured in a fall from the high wire and who now runs a seedy carnival with his wife and their child. Huller insists that the family take in a beautiful stranger as a new sideshow dancer, with whom he develops a new trapeze number. He falls in love with the new star, and the story ends in tragedy.

== Cast ==
- Emil Jannings as Boss Huller
- Maly Delschaft as wife of Boss
- Lya De Putti as Bertha
- Warwick Ward as Artinelli
- Georg John as Sailor

== Release ==
The film was heavily censored when it was released in the United States (except for New York) by excising the entire first reel, "thus destroying the motivation of the tragedy, implying that the acrobat was married to his Eurasian temptress."

== Influence ==
The film is noted for its innovative camerawork with highly expressive movement through space, accomplished by the expressionist cinematographer Karl Freund.

Decades later, the German director Florian Henckel von Donnersmarck cites being unexpectedly exposed to the film as a child of four as the start of his interest in the medium. In a list of the 100 most important German films, compiled in 1994 by the Association of German Cinémathèques, Variety was placed at #45.

This film is believed to contain the first documentation of unicycle hockey – it features a short sequence showing two people playing the game.

== See also ==
- The House That Shadows Built (1931 promotional film by Paramount which excerpts this film)
