= The Rest Is Silence (1959 film) =

1959 film directed by Helmut Käutner

- Film poster
- Directed by: Helmut Käutner
- Written by: Helmut Käutner; William Shakespeare
- Produced by: Harald Braun; Helmut Käutner; Wolfgang Staudte
- Starring: Hardy Krüger; Peter van Eyck; Ingrid Andree
- Cinematography: Igor Oberberg
- Edited by: Klaus Dudenhöfer
- Music by: Bernhard Eichhorn
- Production company: Real Film
- Distributed by: Europa-Filmverleih
- Release date: 22 July 1959
- Running time: 103 minutes
- Country: West Germany
- Language: German

The Rest Is Silence (German: Der Rest ist Schweigen) is a 1959 West German crime film directed by Helmut Käutner and starring Hardy Krüger, Peter van Eyck and Ingrid Andree. The plot is inspired by William Shakespeare's Hamlet, with the setting shifted to postwar West Germany during the Economic Miracle. It was made at the Wandsbek Studios in Hamburg and on location in Oberhausen and in the Lohausen district of Düsseldorf. The film's sets were designed by the art directors Albrecht Becker and Herbert Kirchhoff. It was entered into the 9th Berlin International Film Festival.

== Cast ==
- Hardy Krüger as John H. Claudius
- Peter van Eyck as Paul Claudius
- Ingrid Andree as Fee von Pohl
- Adelheid Seeck as Gertrud Claudius
- Rudolf Forster as Dr. von Pohl
- Boy Gobert as Mike R. Krantz
- Rainer Penkert as Major Horace
- Heinz Drache as Herbert von Pohl
- Charles Régnier as Inspector Fortner
- Siegfried Schürenberg as Johannes Claudius
- Richard Allan as Stanley Goulden
- Josef Sieber as Werks-Pförtner
- Robert Meyn as Dr. Voltman
- Erwin Linder as Direktor
- Werner Schumacher as Werks-Fahrer
