= The Phone Rings Every Night =

1962 film

The Phone Rings Every Night (German: Nachts ging das Telefon) is a 1962 German drama film directed by Géza von Cziffra and starring Ingrid Andree, Karin Heske and Elke Sommer. Two rival gangs clash on a yacht in Saint-Tropez.

== Cast ==
In alphabetical order

- Ingrid Andree
- Karin Heske
- Loni Heuser
- Günter Pfitzmann
- Gunther Philipp
- Elke Sommer
- Leonard Steckel
