= Variety (1935 German film) =

1935 film

- Directed by: Nicolas Farkas
- Written by: Nicolas Farkas; Rolf E. Vanloo
- Based on: The Oath of Stephan Huller by Felix Hollaender
- Produced by: Ernst Garden
- Starring: Annabella; Hans Albers; Attila Hörbiger
- Cinematography: Victor Arménise
- Edited by: Hermann Haller
- Music by: Hans Carste
- Production companies: Bavaria Film; Vandor Film
- Distributed by: Bavaria Film; Kiba Kinobetriebsanstalt (Austria)
- Release date: 17 September 1935
- Running time: 100 minutes
- Countries: France; Germany
- Language: German

Variety (German title: Varieté ) is a 1935 French-German drama film directed by Nicolas Farkas and starring Annabella, Hans Albers and Attila Hörbiger. It is based on the 1912 novel The Oath of Stephan Huller by Felix Hollaender. It features a love triangle between three performers of a high wire act.

It was shot at the Bavaria Studios in Munich and the Joinville Studios in Paris. The film's sets were designed by the art director Serge Piménoff. A separate French-language film Variétés was also produced. The following year a British remake Three Maxims was produced by Herbert Wilcox and starred Anna Neagle.

== Cast ==
- Annabella as Jeanne
- Hans Albers as Pierre
- Attila Hörbiger as Georges
- Karl Etlinger as Max
- Ernst Rotmund as Varieté-Direktor
- Gerhard Dammann as Varieté-Regisseur
- Gustav Püttjer as Emil
- Else Reval as Frau Thomas
- Arthur Reinhardt as Der Pressechef
- Walter Steinweg as Ein Schneider
- Nicolas Koline as Gänsemann
- Gaston Palmer as Ein Jongleur

== Bibliography ==
- Bock, Hans-Michael & Bergfelder, Tim. The Concise CineGraph. Encyclopedia of German Cinema. Berghahn Books, 2009.
