= A Night in Paradise (1919 film) =

- Directed by: Eugen Burg
- Written by: Margot Meyer
- Produced by: Viggo Larsen; Wanda Treumann
- Starring: Wanda Treumann; Reinhold Schünzel
- Cinematography: Josef Dietze
- Production company: Treumann-Larsen-Film
- Release date: 8 August 1919
- Country: Germany
- Languages: Silent; German intertitles

A Night in Paradise (German: Eine Nacht, gelebt im Paradiese) is a 1919 German silent film directed by Eugen Burg and starring Wanda Treumann and Reinhold Schünzel.

The film's sets were designed by the art director Mathieu Oostermann.

== Cast ==
- Wanda Treumann as Gabi Wiedberg
- Reinhold Schünzel as Ede
- Hans Ahrens as Friedrich, ein Diener
- Else Bäck as Frau von Wiedberg
- Rudolph Döll as Dieter von Warling
- Otto Haerting as Herr von Ostburg, Gutsbesitzer
- Wolfgang Schlegel as Walter Kießling
- Ida Stella as Frau von Ostburg
- Ernst Wehlau as Herr von Wiedberg, Gutsbesitzer

== Bibliography ==
- Bock, Hans-Michael & Bergfelder, Tim. The Concise CineGraph. Encyclopedia of German Cinema. Berghahn Books, 2009.
