= Eugen Burg =

German actor (1871–1944)

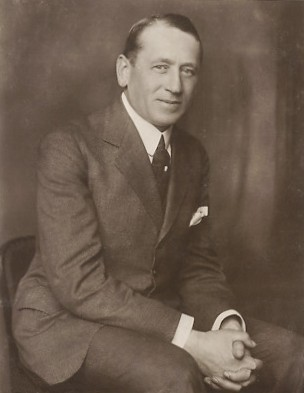
Eugen Burg, c. 1920

Eugen Burg (6 January 1871 – 17 April 1944) was a German actor. His daughter was Hansi Burg. Burg was a close friend of the actor Hans Albers.

Burg was born Eugen Hirschburg into a Jewish family, but later converted to Protestantism. He was banished from the film industry when the Nazi Party came to power in Germany. He later died in Theresienstadt concentration camp.

== Selected filmography ==
- Robert and Bertram (1915)
- In the Castle by the Lake (1918)
- The Secret of Wera Baranska (1919)
- The Secret of the Scaffold (1919)
- A Night in Paradise (1919)
- Colonel Chabert (1920)
- The Black Panther (1921)
- Violet (1921)
- Fridericus Rex (1922)
- Circus People (1922)
- Marie Antoinette, the Love of a King (1922)
- The Island of Tears (1923)
- Old Heidelberg (1923)
- The Wonderful Adventure (1924)
- Gobseck (1924)
- The Third Squadron (1926)
- Wrath of the Seas (1926)
- Fadette (1926)
- Eyes Open, Harry! (1926)
- The Circus of Life (1926)
- A Modern Dubarry (1927)
- Rinaldo Rinaldini (1927)
- Dancing Vienna (1927)
- The Gypsy Baron (1927)
- His Greatest Bluff (1927)
- The Hunt for the Bride (1927)
- Queen of the Boulevards (1927)
- The Mistress (1927)
- Panic (1928)
- It Attracted Three Fellows (1928)
- Who Invented Divorce? (1928)
- Man Against Man (1928)
- Girls, Beware! (1928)
- The First Kiss (1928)
- The Adjutant of the Czar (1929)
- Dawn (1929)
- Ludwig II, King of Bavaria (1929)
- Yes, Yes, Women Are My Weakness (1929)
- The Copper (1930)
- The Ring of the Empress (1930)
- 1914 (1931)
- Mary (1931)
- My Leopold (1931)
- Elisabeth of Austria (1931)
- Der Herzog von Reichstadt (1931)
- The Daredevil (1931)
- Holzapfel Knows Everything (1932)
- Impossible Love (1932)
- The Pride of Company Three (1932)
- The Victor (1932)
- The White Demon (1932)

== Bibliography ==
- Hardt, Ursula. From Caligari to California: Erich Pommer's Life in the International Film Wars. Berghahn Books, 1996.
- Kosta, Barbara. Willing Seduction: The Blue Angel, Marlene Dietrich, and Mass Culture. Berghahn Books, 2009
- Prawer, S.S. Between Two Worlds: The Jewish Presence in German and Austrian Film, 1910-1933. Berghahn Books, 2007.
