= At War in the Diamond Fields =

1921 film

- Directed by: Hans Schomburgk
- Written by: Hans Schomburgk
- Produced by: Hans Schomburgk
- Starring: Oskar Marion; Meg Gehrts-Schomburgk; Willy Kaiser-Hey; Magnus Stifter
- Cinematography: August Brückner
- Production company: Übersee-Film
- Distributed by: Terra Film
- Release date: 13 August 1921
- Country: Germany
- Languages: Silent; German intertitles

At War in the Diamond Fields (German: Im Kampf um Diamantenfelder) is a 1921 German silent adventure film directed by Hans Schomburgk and starring Oskar Marion, Meg Gehrts-Schomburgk and Willy Kaiser-Heyl. It premiered on 13 August 1921.

== Cast ==
- Oskar Marion
- Meg Gehrts-Schomburgk
- Willy Kaiser-Heyl
- Magnus Stifter
- Pietro Bruce
- Hedda Forsten
- Madge Jackson
- Walter von Allwoerden
- Wolfgang von Schwindt

== Bibliography ==
- Grange, William (2008). Cultural Chronicle of the Weimar Republic. Lanham, MD: Scarecrow Press. ISBN 978-0-8108-5967-8.
