= Wanda Treumann =

German actress and film producer (1883–1963)

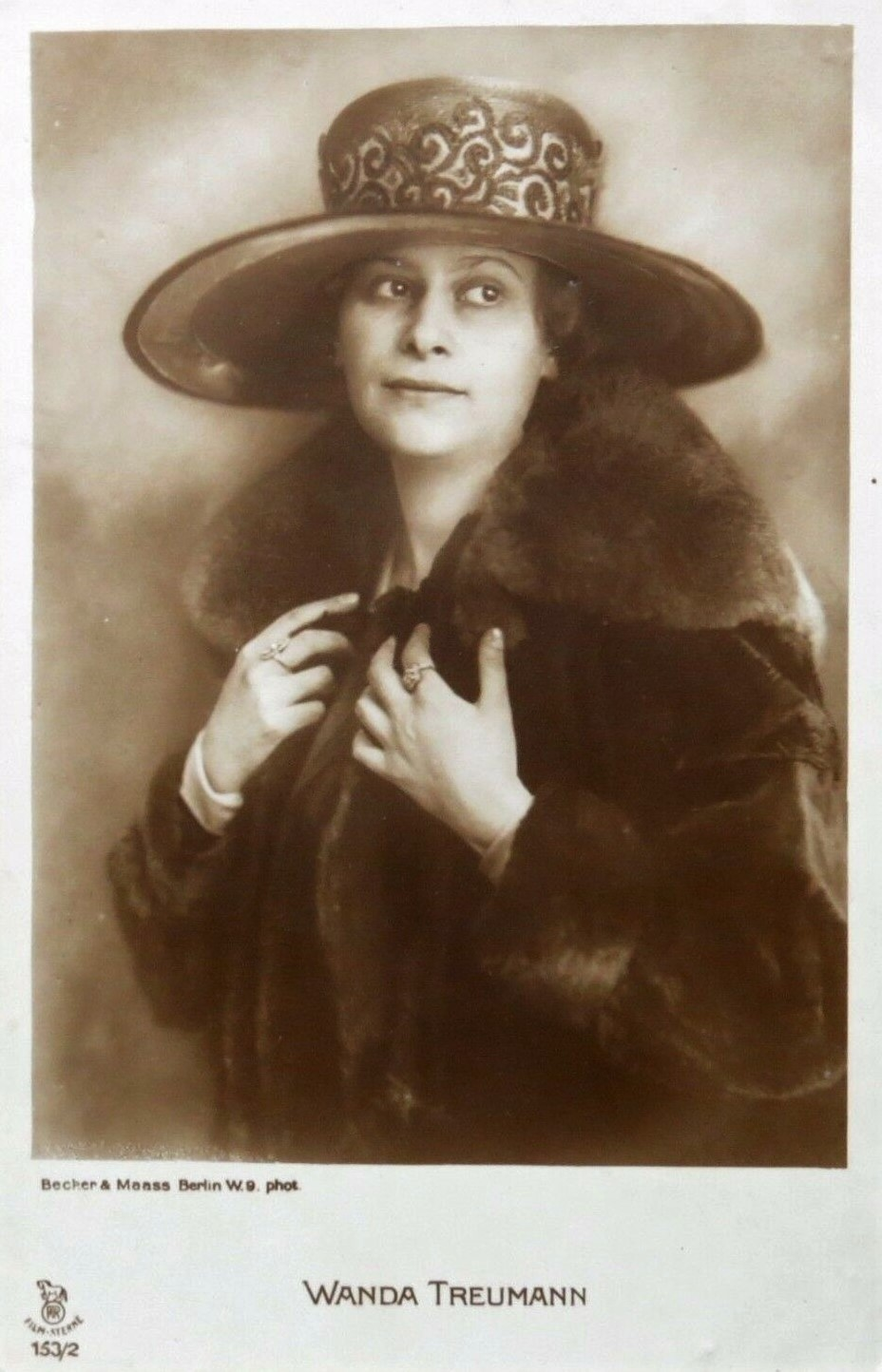
- Born: Wanda Reich; 17 November 1883; Loslau, Upper Silesia, German Empire
- Died: 29 April 1963 (aged 79); Melbourne, Australia
- Occupations: Actress, Producer
- Years active: 1910-1922 (film)

Wanda Treumann (born Wanda Reich; 17 November 1883 – 29 April 1963) was a German theatre and film actress and film producer of the silent era. A leading lady in a number of productions during the Imperial era and the Weimar Republic, she retired from the screen in 1922. Her later life remains obscure.

== Early life ==
Wanda Treumann was born in Wodzisław Śląski (German: Loslau), then part of the German Empire, as Wanda Reich into a Jewish family. Her father, Salomon Reich, belonged to the city’s financial and intellectual elite, while her mother, Amalia Reich, came from the Trumann family. She lived in Upper Silesia until 1903, when she married Carl Treumann, who also came from a Jewish family from Wodzisław Śląski and was related to her mother’s relatives. After their marriage, she moved with her husband to Berlin, where she developed her acting career and later became a film producer.

== Career ==
She ran a film studio in Lankwitz and, after 1922, focused mainly on her theatre career. She was widowed in 1927. Her second husband was Hans Brennen, from whom she divorced in 1937. Amid rising antisemitism in Nazi Germany, she emigrated to Australia in 1938. She settled in Melbourne, where she was active in the local Jewish community. She died in 1963.

=== Selected filmography ===
- The Oath of Stephan Huller (1912)
- The Coquette (1917)
- Not of the Woman Born (1918)
- In the Castle by the Lake (1918)
- The Secret of the Scaffold (1919)
- A Night in Paradise (1919)
- The Secret of Wera Baranska (1919)
- Colonel Chabert (1920)

== Bibliography ==
- Thomas Elsaesser & Michael Wedel. A Second Life: German Cinema's First Decades. Amsterdam University Press, 1996.
- Piotr Hojka, Sebastian Rosenbaum, Następnym razem chciałabym zagrać lepiej, [w:] "Czasypismo" nr 1-2/2025, Katowice 2025
