= Sunken Worlds =

1922 film

- Directed by: Siegfried Philippi
- Written by: Walter Schmidthässler
- Produced by: Ria Jende
- Starring: Victor Varconi; Ria Jende; Hans Albers
- Cinematography: Heinrich Gärtner
- Production company: Ria Jende-Film
- Distributed by: Ria Jende-Film
- Release date: 7 October 1922
- Country: Germany
- Languages: Silent; German intertitles

Sunken Worlds (German: Versunkene Welten) is a 1922 German silent film directed by Siegfried Philippi and starring Victor Varconi, Ria Jende and Hans Albers.

== Cast ==
- Victor Varconi
- Ria Jende
- Max Devrient
- Hans Albers
- Henry Bender
- Ernst Dernburg
- Marie Grimm-Einödshofer
- Martha Hartmann
- Guido Herzfeld
- Rudolf Klein-Rhoden
- Marija Leiko
- Gustav May
- Loni Nest
- Hermann Picha
- Gaby Ungar

== Bibliography ==
- Hans-Michael Bock and Tim Bergfelder. The Concise Cinegraph: An Encyclopedia of German Cinema. Berghahn Books, 2009.
