= The Secret of Wera Baranska =

- Directed by: Eugen Burg; Franz Porten; Rosa Porten
- Written by: Robert Misch
- Produced by: Viggo Larsen; Wanda Treumann
- Starring: Wanda Treumann; Paul Hartmann; Reinhold Schünzel
- Production company: Treumann-Larsen-Film
- Distributed by: Treumann-Larsen-Film
- Release date: 1 September 1919
- Country: Germany
- Languages: Silent; German intertitles

The Secret of Wera Baranska (German: Das Geheimnis der Wera Baranska) is a 1919 German silent film directed by Eugen Burg, Franz Porten and Rosa Porten. It stars Wanda Treumann, Paul Hartmann, and Reinhold Schünzel.

== Cast ==
- Wanda Treumann as Wera von Boranska
- Paul Hartmann
- Reinhold Schünzel

== Bibliography ==
- Bock, Hans-Michael & Bergfelder, Tim. The Concise CineGraph. Encyclopedia of German Cinema. Berghahn Books, 2009.
