= The Oath of Stephan Huller (novel) =

1912 novel by Felix Hollaender

- First edition
- Author: Felix Hollaender
- Language: German
- Genre: Drama
- Publisher: Ullstein
- Publication date: 1912
- Publication place: German Empire
- Media type: Print

The Oath of Stephan Huller (German: Der Eid des Stephan Huller) is a 1912 novel by the German writer Felix Hollaender.

== Adaptations ==
It has been made into films on five occasions:

- The Oath of Stephan Huller, a 1912 film directed by Viggo Larsen
- The Oath of Stephan Huller, a 1921 film directed by Reinhard Bruck
- Variety, a 1925 film directed by Ewald Andre Dupont
- Variety, a 1935 film directed by Nicholas Farkas (also as French-language film version Variétés)
- Drei vom Varieté, a 1954 film directed by Kurt Neumann

== Bibliography ==
- Goble, Alan. The Complete Index to Literary Sources in Film. Walter de Gruyter, 1999.
