= The Adventures of Captain Hasswell =

1925 film

- Directed by: Rolf Randolf
- Production company: Ranneg-Film
- Distributed by: Ranneg-Film
- Release date: 28 October 1925
- Country: Germany
- Languages: Silent; German intertitles

The Adventures of Captain Hasswell (German: Die Abenteuer des Kapitän Hasswell) is a 1925 German silent adventure film directed by Rolf Randolf and starring Rudolf Hilberg, Ria Jende and Ernst Pittschau.

The film's sets were designed by the art director Gustav A. Knauer.

== Cast ==
In alphabetical order

- Rudolf Hilberg as Jimmy Pitt, Weltenbummler
- Ria Jende as Baronin Mary
- Ernst Pittschau as von Berkhof
- Rolf Randolf as Kapitän Hasswell, Millionär
- Maria Zelenka as Gräfin Helga Scanzoni

== Bibliography ==
- Schöning, Jörg (2007). Bewegte See: Maritimes Kino 1912–1957 [Rough Seas: Maritime Cinema 1912–1957]. Munich: Edition Text + Kritik. ISBN 978-3-88377-895-2.
