= The Panther Bride =

- Directed by: Léo Lasko
- Written by: Richard Hutter
- Produced by: Paul Davidson
- Starring: Carl Auen; Victor Janson; Ria Jende
- Cinematography: Friedrich Weinmann; Kurt Waschneck
- Production company: PAGU
- Distributed by: UFA
- Release date: July 1919
- Country: Germany
- Languages: Silent; German intertitles

The Panther Bride (German: Die Pantherbraut) is a 1919 German silent crime film directed by Léo Lasko and starring Carl Auen, Victor Janson and Ria Jende. It was part of a series of films featuring the detective character Joe Deebs.

It was shot at the Tempelhof Studios in Berlin. The film's sets were designed by the art director Kurt Richter.

== Cast ==
- Carl Auen as Joe Deebs, Detektiv
- Victor Janson as Ferry Douglas
- Ria Jende as Ellen
- Bernhard Goetzke as Priester
- Martin Hartwig as Fakir
- Adolf Klein as Direktor Eric Hansen
- Albert Patry as Oberpriester der Kali
- Emil Rameau as Dr. Duffoir

== Bibliography ==
- Ken Wlaschin. Silent Mystery and Detective Movies: A Comprehensive Filmography. McFarland, 2009.
- Hans-Michael Bock & Michael Töteberg. Das Ufa-Buch. Zweitausendeins, 1992.
