= The Princess of Urbino =

1919 film

- Directed by: Paul Legband
- Written by: Margarethe Schmahl
- Starring: Ria Jende; Eduard Rothauser; Hans Albers
- Production company: Luna-Film
- Distributed by: Luna-Film
- Release date: November 1919
- Country: Germany
- Languages: Silent; German intertitles

The Princess of Urbino (German: Die Prinzessin von Urbino) is a 1919 German silent crime film directed by Paul Legband and starring Ria Jende, Eduard Rothauser and Hans Albers.

== Bibliography ==
- Hans-Michael Bock and Tim Bergfelder. The Concise Cinegraph: An Encyclopedia of German Cinema. Berghahn Books, 2009.
