= Hans Albers =

German actor and singer (1891–1960)

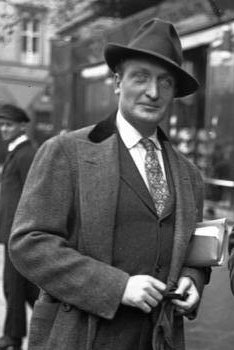
- Hans Albers
- Born: Hans Philipp August Albers; 22 September 1891; Hamburg, German Empire
- Died: 24 July 1960 (aged 68); Starnberg, West Germany
- Occupations: Actor, singer
- Years active: 1918–1960
- Partner: Hansi Burg

Signature
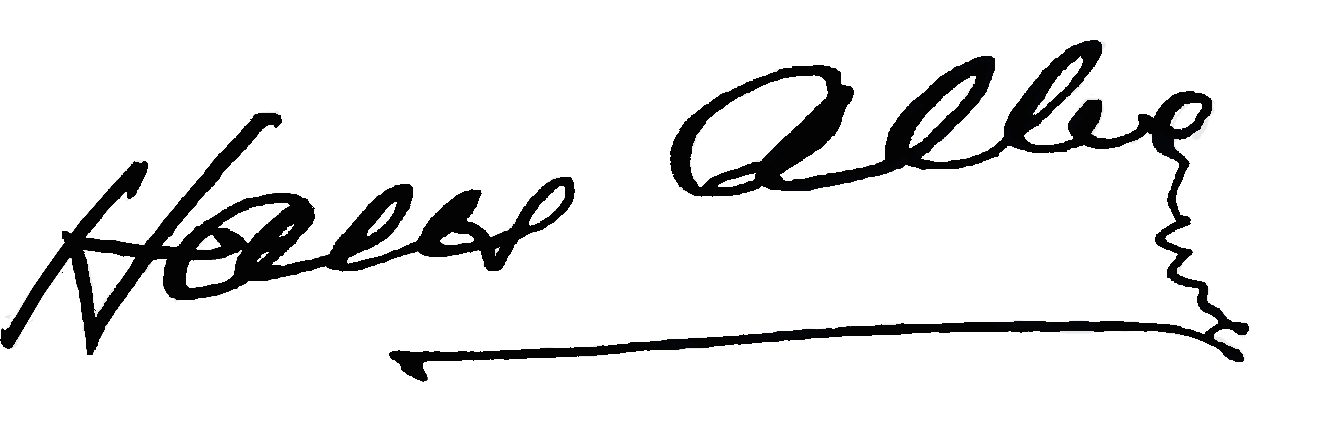

Hans Philipp August Albers (22 September 1891 – 24 July 1960), also known by his nickname “der blonde Hans” (The Blond Hans), was a German actor and singer. He was the biggest male movie star in Germany between 1930 and 1960 and one of the most popular German actors of the twentieth century.

== Early life ==
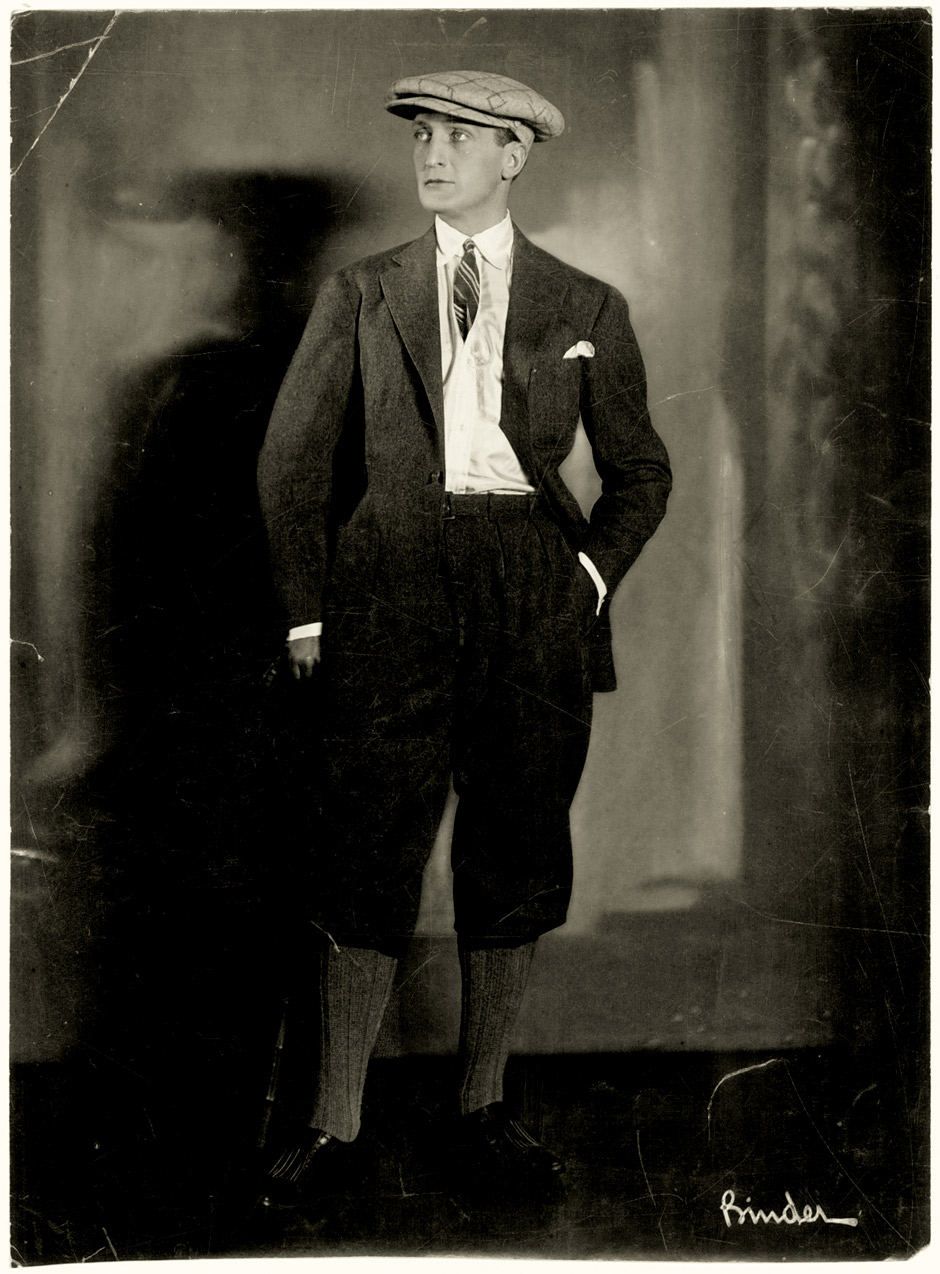
Hans Albers in 1922.

Hans Albers was born in Hamburg, the son of a butcher, and grew up in the district of St. Georg. He was seriously interested in acting by his late teens and took acting classes without the knowledge of his parents. In 1915 Albers was drafted to serve in the German Army in World War I, but was wounded early on. After his release from the Hospital in Wiesbaden where he had been treated, he performed in the local Residenztheater in comedies, antics and operettas. After the war Albers moved to Berlin, where he found work as a comedic actor in various Weimar-Era Berlin theatres. His breakthrough performance was that of a waiter in the play Verbrecher (Criminals). It was also in Berlin that Albers began a long-term relationship with Jewish actress Hansi Burg (1898–1975). Their relationship ended only when he died in 1960.

After roles in over one hundred silent films, Albers starred in the first German talkie Die Nacht gehört uns (The Night Belongs to Us) in 1929. Soon thereafter, Albers played big-mouthed strong man Mazeppa alongside Marlene Dietrich in her star-making classic Der blaue Engel (The Blue Angel). Albers himself shot to fame in 1930 with the movie The Copper and constantly enhanced his star status with similar daredevil roles in the 1930s. He was probably at his best when teamed-up with fellow German movie legend Heinz Rühmann, as in Bombs on Monte Carlo (1931) and Der Mann, der Sherlock Holmes war (1937). Many of Albers' songs from his movies became huge hits and some even remain popular to this day.

== The 1930s and the Second World War ==
When the Nazis came to power in 1933, Albers and his Jewish girlfriend Hansi Burg moved to Lake Starnberg in Bavaria. They married in 1934 and Albers' contract with UFA was cancelled. While Albers himself never showed public support for the Nazi regime, he became the most popular actor under Nazi rule. The actor nevertheless avoided an overly close association in public. As the ultimate sign of his popularity, the Nazis even silently accepted his relationship with Hansi Burg for a long time. But Albers finally gave in to pressure. Hansi Burg went to Switzerland and then to Great Britain in 1939, but they secretly remained a couple with him even managing to send her financial support. They were reunited after the war, when she returned to Germany in a British uniform.

In 1943, Albers was paid a huge sum of money to star in UFA's big-budgeted anniversary picture Münchhausen but was careful not to give the impression that he was endorsing the National Socialist regime, which was indeed never asked of him. Also in 1943, Albers starred in another classic German film Große Freiheit Nr. 7 with actress Ilse Werner. Some of the scenes are said to have been shot in Prague because of bomb damage to Hamburg. The sailing ship Padua used for the outdoor scenes of the film has survived under Soviet and Russian flag until this day as Kruzenshtern.

== Post war ==
After World War II Albers was affluent and, on account of his association with Hansi Burg, he avoided the professional ban and financial plight which many actors were facing at that time. Nevertheless, German "heroes" were considered undesirable by the occupation government that wanted to promote its own stars. This accounted for a major hiatus in his career and made him hard to cast. Eventually he found an opening with respectable wisdom-with-age type character parts, and enjoyed some public acclaim, but with these parts he never again enjoyed his huge stardom of the 1930s and early 1940s. By the early 1950s, his age was finally beginning to show and his powerful presence and freshness were almost wholly lost. His decline was exacerbated by his increasing alcoholism during the 1950s. Yet he remained active in movies until the very end.

== Death ==
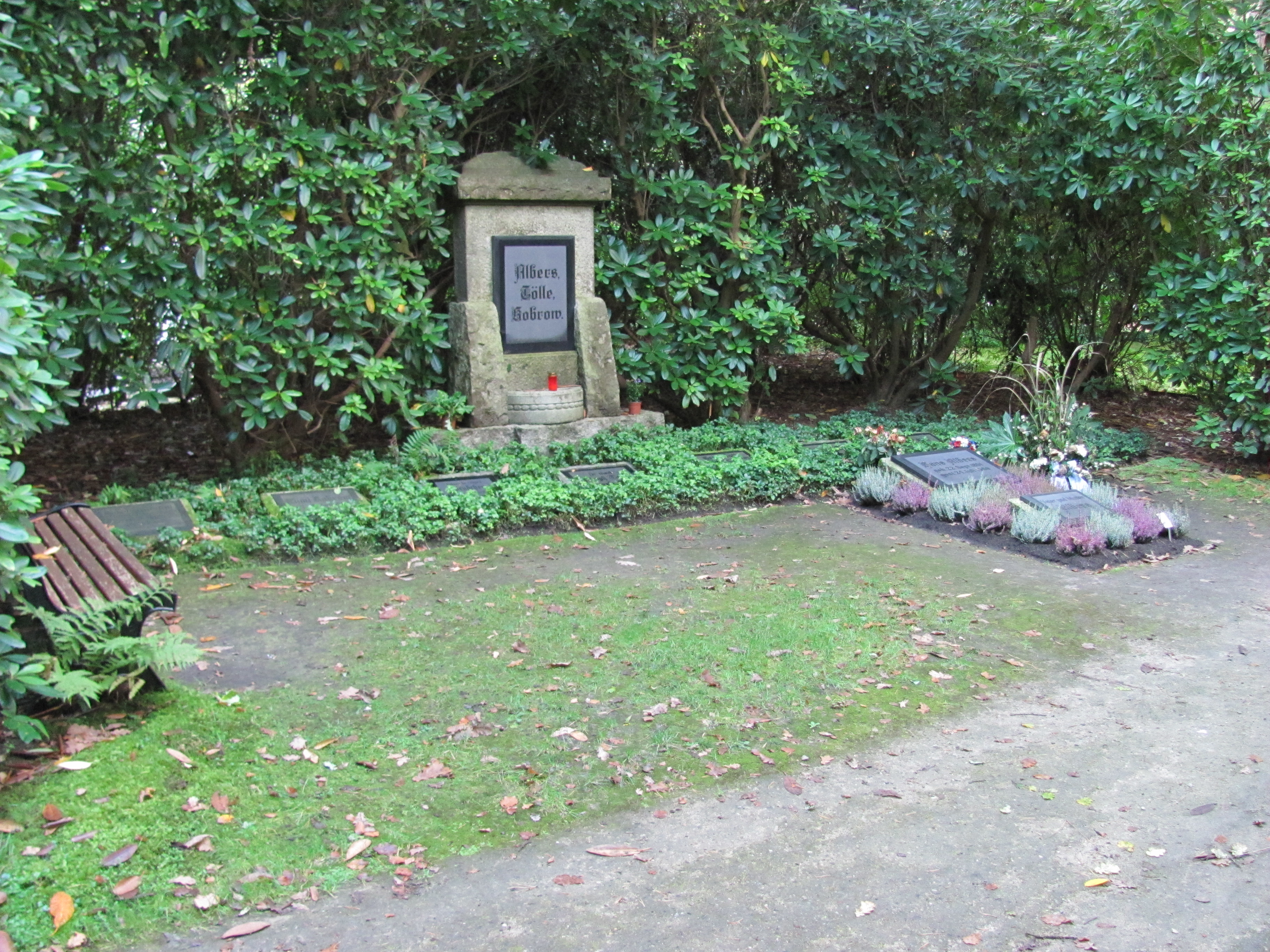
Grave of Albers at the Ohlsdorf Cemetery in Hamburg

Hans Albers collapsed during a theater performance with massive internal bleeding and died months later on 24 July 1960 at a sanatorium in Kempfenhausen near Lake Starnberg at the age of 68. He was cremated and subsequently buried at the Ohlsdorf Cemetery in Hamburg, the city of his birth.

== Legacy ==
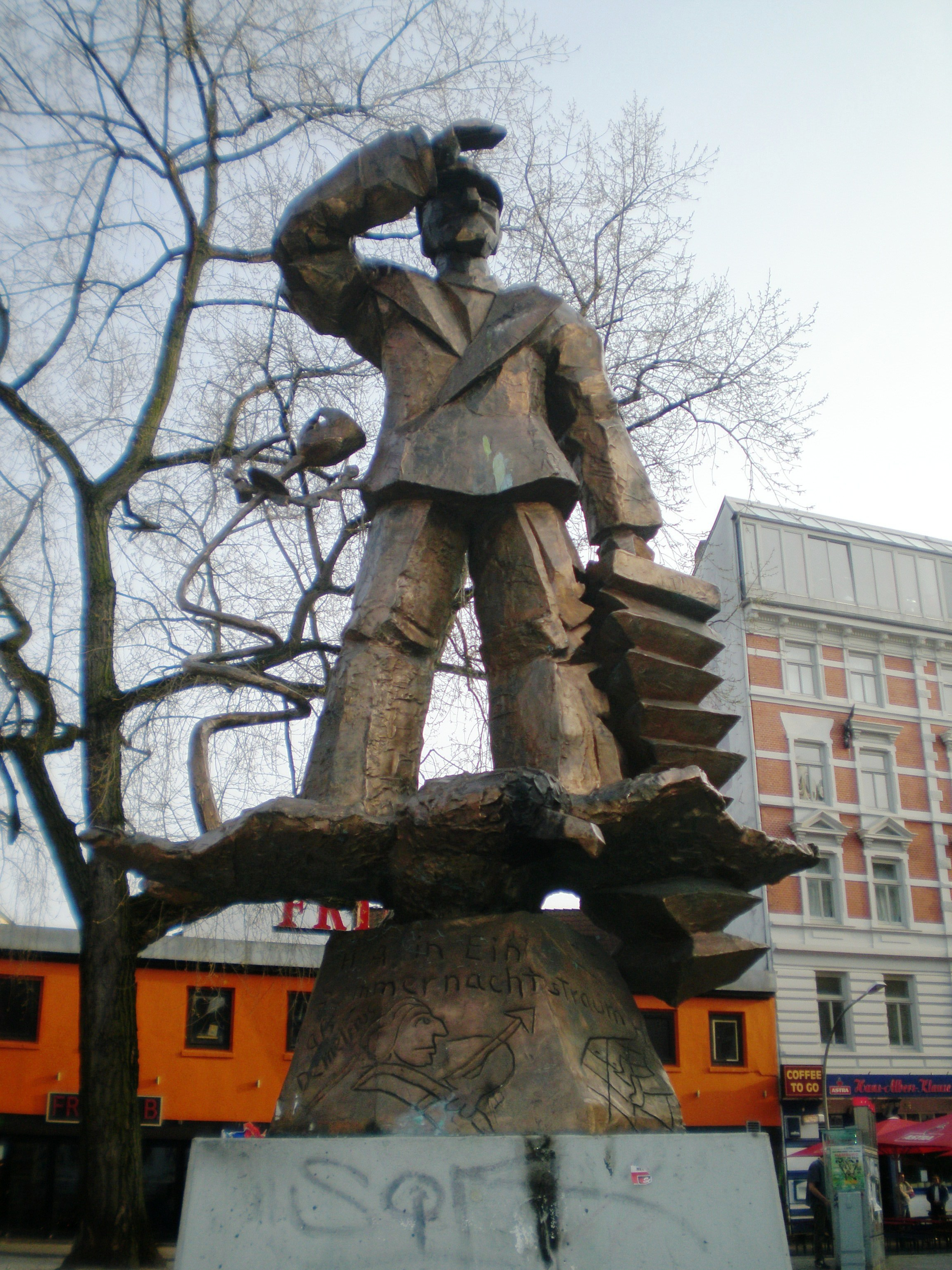
Hans Albers statue in the Hans-Albers-Platz, Hamburg-St. Pauli. By Jörg Immendorff, 1986

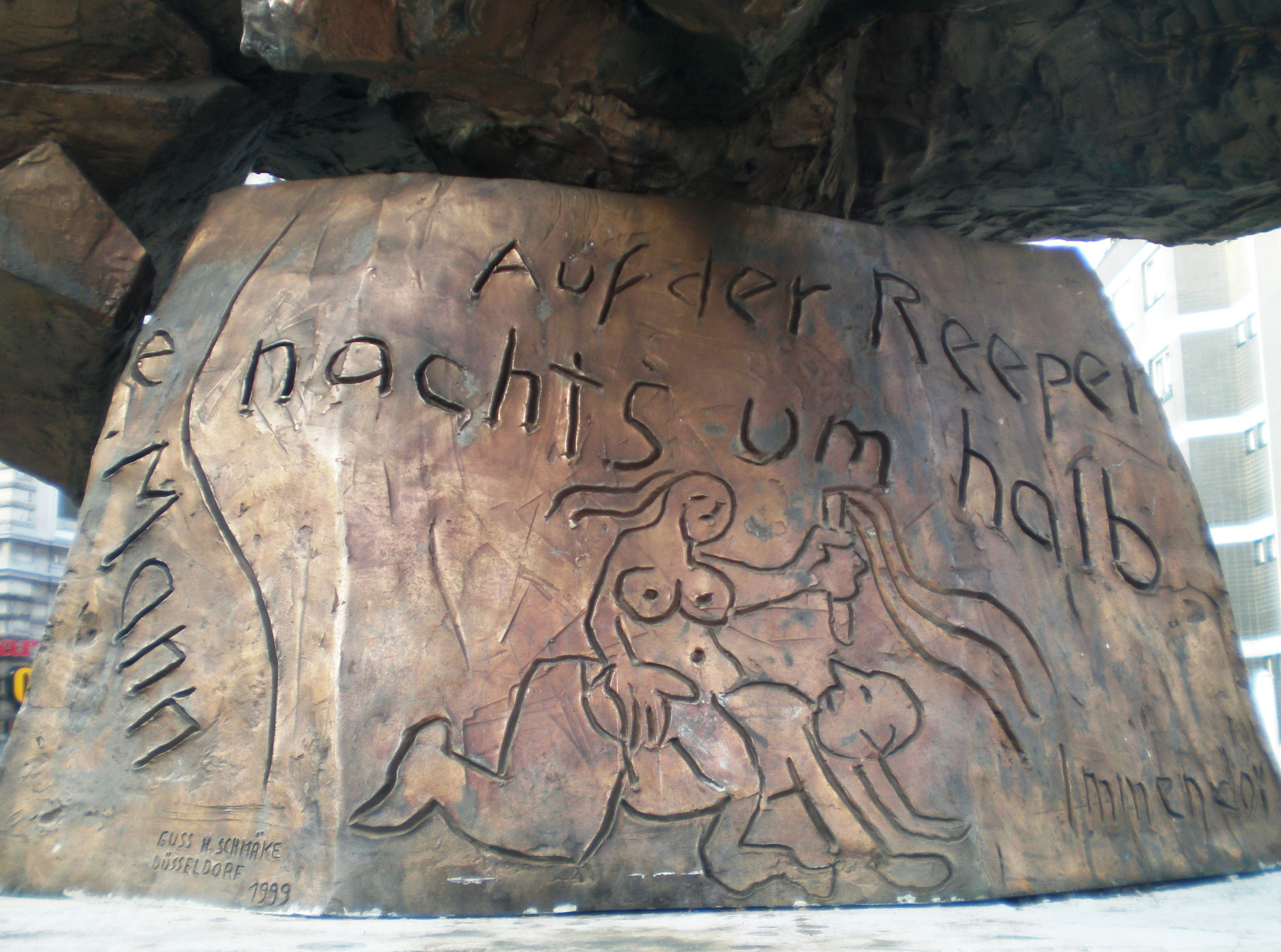
Inscription at the base of the Hans Albers statue: Auf der Reeperbahn nachts um halb eins

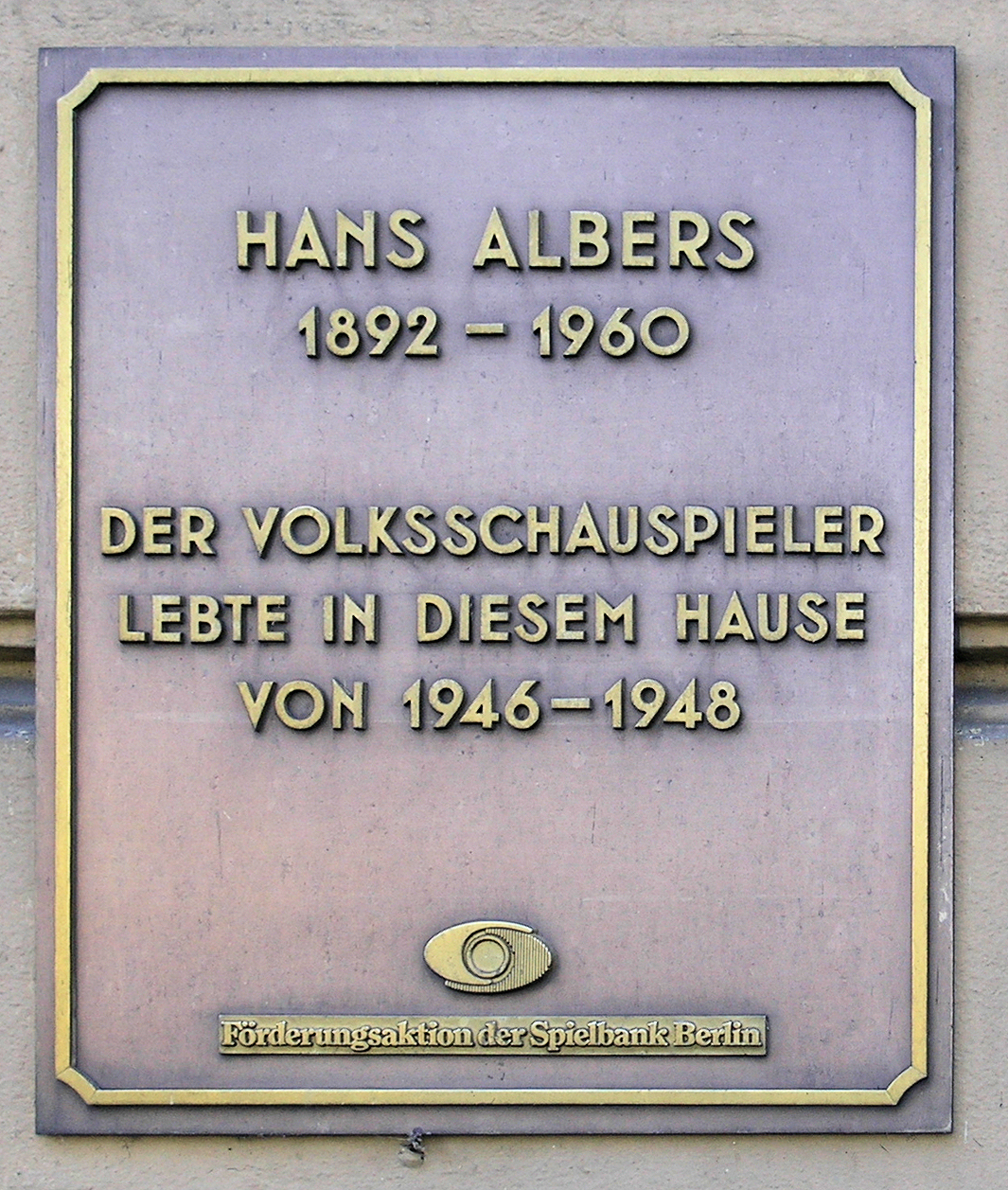
Memorial plaque to Hans Albers. Schöneberger Ufer 61, Berlin-Tiergarten

Albers' name will forever be closely associated with his hometown of Hamburg, in particular the district of St. Pauli where there is a square named Hans-Albers-Platz in his honour. Today he is probably better known for his music than his films; some of his songs have remained familiar to later generations of Germans.

Outside of Northern Europe, Albers remains virtually unknown; however the image of an older man in a seaman's cap and raincoat playing accordion and singing remains familiar internationally. As a case in point, McDonald's used such an image in an American television ad campaign in 1986. Albers actually had no significant experience on the water, this being restricted to a one-day trip to Heligoland.

Many of Albers' songs were humorous tales of drunken, womanizing sailors on shore-leave, with double entendres such as "It hurts the first time, but with time, you get used to it" in reference to a girl falling in love for the first time. Albers' songs were often peppered with expressions in Low German, which is spoken in Northern Germany. One of his signature songs is Auf der Reeperbahn nachts um halb eins, ("On the Reeperbahn at Half Past Midnight") which has become one of the best-known songs about Hamburg and also an unofficial anthem of the St. Pauli district where the Reeperbahn itself is located. Hans-Albers-Platz, one block south of the Reeperbahn, features a statue of Albers, created by the German artist Jörg Immendorff.

== Filmography ==
=== Silent films ===
Title	Year	Director	Role	Co-stars
Jahreszeiten des Lebens	1915	Franz Hofer	N/A	Frida Richard
Die Tochter der Gräfin Stachowska	1917	Otto Rippert	N/A	Hella Moja, Werner Krauss
Der Mut zur Sünde	1918	Heinrich Bolten-Baeckers and Robert Leffler	N/A	Olga Desmond, Guido Schützendorf
Halkas Gelöbnis	1918	Alfred Halm	N/A	Lya Mara
Das Spitzentuch der Fürstin Wolkowska	1918	Robert Reinert	N/A	Maria Carmi
Am Scheidewege	1918	Alfred Halm	Viktor Heyden	Mady Christians
Liebe und Leben	1918	Walter Schmidthässler	N/A	Käthe Haack
Die Dreizehn	1918	Alfred Halm	Ferragus	Mady Christians
Irrwege der Liebe	1918	Josef Stein	Norman	Margarete Kupfer, Victor Janson
Der Fluch des Nuri	1918	Carl Boese	Robert Ley	Hella Thornegg
Das Lied der Colombine	1918	Emil Justitz	Hans von Rotfels	Olga Engl
Sadja	1918	Adolf Gärtner, Erik Lund	Old Sage	Eva May
A Man's Girlhood	1919	Karl Grune	N/A	Lotte Stein, Olga Engl
Die Tochter des Bajazzo	1919	Arthur Ullmann	Troubadour	Emil Rameau
Das Tor der Freiheit	1919	Walter Schmidthässler	N/A	Margarete Schön
Madeleine	1919	Siegfried Philippi	N/A	Ria Jende, Olga Engl
The Princess of Urbino	1919	Paul Legband	N/A	Ria Jende
Lola Montez	1919	Rudolf Walther-Fein	N/A	Maria Zelenka
The Grand Babylon Hotel	1920	E. A. Dupont	N/A	Max Landa
Die Schlange mit dem Mädchenkopf	1920	Rudolf Walther-Fein	Prince	Ria Jende
Die 999. Nacht	1920	Fred Sauer	Nurredin	Erna Morena, Bernhard Goetzke
Berlin W.	1920	Manfred Noa	Pretender	Tzwetta Tzatschewa, Meinhart Maur
Die Kronjuwelen des Herzogs von Rochester	1920	Paul Legband	N/A	Johannes Riemann, Ria Jende
The Hustler	1920	Emil Justitz	Harald Petersen	Anita Berber
The Marquise of O	1920	Paul Legband	Marquis of O	Ernst Stahl-Nachbaur
Schieber	1921	Manfred Noa	Dr. Paul Grünmeier	Tzwetta Tzatschewa, Hermann Picha
Taschendiebe	1921	Emil Justitz	N/A	Erna Morena, Maria Zelenka
Sons of the Night	1921	Manfred Noa	N/A	Ludwig Rex, Tzwetta Tzatschewa
Die große und die kleine Welt	1921	Max Mack	N/A	Alfred Abel, Charlotte Ander
Menschenopfer	1922	Carl Wilhelm	N/A	Alfred Abel,
The Mistress of the King	1922	Frederic Zelnik	N/A	Erich Kaiser-Titz, Lya Mara
The Testament of Joe Sivers	1922	Conrad Wiene	N/A	Karl Falkenberg
Lumpaci the Vagabond	1922	Carl Wilhelm	N/A	Wilhelm Diegelmann, Josefine Dora
Sunken Worlds	1922	Siegfried Philippi	N/A	Victor Varconi, Ria Jende
The False Dimitri	1922	Hans Steinhoff	Count Jaro Lensky	Alfred Abel, Agnes Straub
Irene of Gold	1923	Frederic Zelnik	N/A	Olga Engl, Margarete Schlegel
Lyda Ssanin	1923	Frederic Zelnik	N/A	Carl Auen, Lya Mara
Fräulein Raffke	1923	Richard Eichberg	Baron	Werner Krauss, Lee Parry
The Tiger of Circus Farini	1923	Uwe Jens Krafft	N/A	Helena Makowska, Hermann Picha
Inge Larsen	1923	Hans Steinhoff	Boring Attaché	Henny Porten, Paul Otto
By Order of Pompadour	1924	Frederic Zelnik	Count of Riverolle	Lya Mara, Frida Richard
Hunted Men	1924	Johannes Riemann	Karl von Behn	Lucy Doraine, Johannes Riemann
Guillotine	1924	Guido Parish	Gaston Brieux	Willy Fritsch, Marcella Albani
The Wonderful Adventure	1924	Manfred Noa	Henry Valescu	Vilma Bánky, Georg Alexander
The Venus of Montmartre	1925	Frederic Zelnik	Tricotin	Lya Mara, Jack Trevor
The Girl with a Patron	1925	Max Mack	N/A	Ossi Oswalda and Willy Fritsch
Wood Love	1925	Hans Neumann	Demetrius	Werner Krauss, Valeska Gert
Women of Luxury	1925	Erich Schönfelder	Kurt von Randow	Lee Parry, Olaf Fjord
The King and the Girl	1925	Nunzio Malasomma	Brechard	Luciano Albertini, Evi Eva
Athletes	1925	Frederic Zelnik	Count Sternfeld	Asta Nielsen, Gregori Chmara
Semi-Silk	1925	Richard Oswald	Alex Bums / Pumm	Valeska Stock, Mary Kid
Upstairs and Downstairs	1925	Richard Oswald, Carl Wilhelm	Otto Flaschenhals	Sig Arno, Mary Kid
German Hearts on the German Rhine	1926	Fred Sauer	N/A	Gyula Szőreghy, Grete Reinwald
Malice	1926	Manfred Noa	N/A	Paul Wegener, Olga Chekhova
The Blue Danube	1926	Frederic Zelnik	Count Jaromir	Harry Liedtke, Lya Mara
The Prince and the Dancer	1926	Richard Eichberg	N/A	Willy Fritsch, Lucy Doraine
Hunted People	1926	Nunzio Malasomma	Gordon	Carlo Aldini, Maly Delschaft
The Bank Crash of Unter den Linden	1926	Paul Merzbach	Fritz Bellmann	Alfred Abel, Margarete Schlegel
My Friend the Chauffeur	1926	Erich Waschneck	Sir Ralph Moray	Ferdinand von Alten, Livio Pavanelli
Kissing Is No Sin	1926	Rudolf Walther-Fein, Rudolf Dworsky	N/A	Xenia Desni, Ellen Plessow
Only a Dancing Girl	1926	Olof Molander	Restaurant Guest	Lil Dagover, Walter Janssen
Nixchen	1926	Kurt Blachy	Lutz von Lonna	Xenia Desni, Harry Liedtke
Wrath of the Seas	1926	Manfred Noa	Tim Kreuger	Ágnes Esterházy, Nils Asther
The Trumpets are Blowing	1926	Carl Boese	N/A	Anita Dorris, Fritz Spira
Department Store Princess	1926	Heinz Paul	N/A	Hella Moja, Paul Graetz
The Laughing Husband	1926	Rudolf Walther-Fein, Rudolf Dworsky	Count Balthasar Selztal	Livio Pavanelli, Elisabeth Pinajeff
Darling, Count the Cash	1926	Felix Basch	Theophil	Sig Arno, Ossi Oswalda
The Three Mannequins	1926	Jaap Speyer	Impostor	Anton Pointner, Lydia Potechina
The Fallen	1926	Rudolf Walther-Fein, Rudolf Dworsky	Hammer	Asta Nielsen, William Dieterle, Olga Chekhova
We Belong to the Imperial-Royal Infantry Regiment	1926	Richard Oswald	Lieutenant Ahrens	Mary Kid, Colette Brettel
I Once Had a Comrade	1926	Conrad Wiene	N/A	Olaf Fjord, Grete Reinwald
Rinaldo Rinaldini	1927	Max Obal, Rudolf Dworsky	Baron Salvi	Luciano Albertini, Olga Engl
Die glühende Gasse	1927	Paul Sugar	The Distinguished Stranger	Helga Thomas, Angelo Ferrari
Eine kleine Freundin braucht jeder Mann	1927	Paul Heidemann	Otto-Otto	Julius Falkenstein, Vera Schmiterlöw
The Dollar Princess and her Six Admirers	1927	Felix Basch	Secretary	Liane Haid, Georg Alexander
The Woman Who Couldn't Say No	1927	Fred Sauer	N/A	Lee Parry, Gustav Fröhlich
A Perfect Gentleman	1927	Vilhelm Bryde, Gösta Ekman	Commandant Jacques Renard	La Jana, Karin Swanström
The Villa in Tiergarten Park	1927	Franz Osten	Baron Etville	Joe Stöckel, Aud Egede-Nissen
The Golden Abyss	1927	Mario Bonnard	Baron Armand	Liane Haid, André Roanne
Always Be True and Faithful	1927	Reinhold Schünzel	N/A	Rosa Valetti, Sig Arno
Students' Love	1927	Robert Land	Blasiera	Fritz Kortner, Agnes Straub
Marie's Soldier	1927	Erich Schönfelder	Wonneberger	Xenia Desni, Harry Liedtke
A Modern Dubarry	1927	Alexander Korda	Toinette's First Lover	María Corda, Alfred Abel
Princess Olala	1928	Robert Land	René	Walter Rilla, Marlene Dietrich
The Criminal of the Century	1928	Max Obal	Aristide Trasymopolus	Luciano Albertini, Gritta Ley
Master and Mistress	1928	Arthur Burger	Arthur Burger	Maly Delschaft
Who Invented Divorce?	1928	Wolfgang Neff	N/A	Alfred Abel, Charlotte Ander
Doctor Schäfer	1928	Jacob Fleck, Luise Fleck	Dr. Greber	Evelyn Holt, Iván Petrovich
The Lady from Argentina	1928	Siegfried Philippi	N/A	Gritta Ley, Leopold von Ledebur
Suzy Saxophone	1928	Carl Lamac	Harry Holt	Anny Ondra, Grit Haid
Today I Was With Frieda	1928	Siegfried Philippi	Eric Hahn	Margarete Kupfer, Evi Eva
It Attracted Three Fellows	1928	Carl Wilhelm	Transferred Lieutenant	Ossi Oswalda, Fritz Kampers
Woman in Flames	1928	Max Reichmann	Head of Store Departement	Olga Chekhova, Ferdinand von Alten
Rasputin	1928	Martin Berger	Sergej Ordinsky	Gregori Chmara, Diana Karenne
Asphalt	1929	Joe May	First Thief	Albert Steinrück, Gustav Fröhlich, Betty Amann
Furnished Room	1929	Fred Sauer	Edler von Stepanowic	Margot Landa, Fritz Schulz
Mascots	1929	Felix Basch	Antoine	Käthe von Nagy, Jeanne Helbling
Yes, Yes, Women Are My Weakness	1929	Edmund Heuberger	Baron Hans Bingen Jr.	Georgia Lind, Eugen Burg
Inherited Passions	1929	Gustav Ucicky	Gauner	Walter Rilla, Fritz Alberti
Heilige oder Dirne	1929	Martin Berger	Varnesi	María Corda, Vladimir Gajdarov
The Veil Dancer	1929	Charles Burguet	N/A	René Navarre, Hertha von Walther
The Crimson Circle	1929	Frederic Zelnik	Marl's Servant	Lya Mara, Fred Louis Lerch, Stewart Rome
Dear Homeland	1929	Carl Wilhelm	Orginsky	Renate Müller, Jakob Tiedtke

=== Sound films ===
Title	Year	Director	Role	Co-stars
The Night Belongs to Us	1929	Carl Froelich	Harry Bredow	Charlotte Ander, Otto Wallburg
The Blue Angel	1930	Josef von Sternberg	Mazeppa	Marlene Dietrich, Emil Jannings, Kurt Gerron
The Copper	1930	Richard Eichberg	Sergeant Harry Cross	Charlotte Susa, Eugen Burg
Hans in Every Street	1930	Carl Froelich	Hans Steindecker	Camilla Horn, Gustav Diessl
Three Days of Love	1931	Heinz Hilpert	Frantz	Käthe Dorsch, Trude Berliner
Bombs on Monte Carlo	1931	Hanns Schwarz	Craddock	Heinz Rühmann, Anna Sten, Peter Lorre
The Daredevil	1931	Richard Eichberg	Hans Röder	Martha Eggerth, Leonard Steckel
The White Demon	1932	Kurt Gerron	Heini Gildemeister	Gerda Maurus, Peter Lorre
Monte Carlo Madness	1932	Hanns Schwarz	Captain Erickson	Sari Maritza, Heinz Rühmann
The Victor	1932	Hans Hinrich, Paul Martin	Hans Kühnert	Käthe von Nagy, Julius Falkenstein
Quick	1932	Robert Siodmak	Quick	Lilian Harvey, Paul Hörbiger
F.P.1 Doesn't Respond	1932	Karl Hartl	Major Ellissen	Sybille Schmitz, Paul Hartmann, Peter Lorre
Today Is the Day	1933	Kurt Gerron	Hannes Eckmann	Luise Rainer, Oscar Karlweis
Ein gewisser Herr Gran	1933	Gerhard Lamprecht	Mr. Gran	Albert Bassermann, Walter Rilla, Olga Chekhova
Refugees	1933	Gustav Ucicky	Arneth	Käthe von Nagy, Eugen Klöpfer, Veit Harlan
Gold	1934	Karl Hartl	Werner Holk	Brigitte Helm, Friedrich Kayßler, Lien Deyers
Peer Gynt	1934	Fritz Wendhausen	Peer Gynt	Lucie Höflich, Marieluise Claudius, Olga Chekhova
Hangmen, Women and Soldiers	1935	Johannes Meyer	Captain Michael von Prack	Charlotte Susa, Aribert Wäscher
Variety	1935	Nicolas Farkas	Pierre	Annabella, Attila Hörbiger
Savoy Hotel 217	1936	Gustav Ucicky	Andrei Antonovitch Wolodkin	Brigitte Horney, René Deltgen, Käthe Dorsch
Under Blazing Heavens	1936	Gustav Ucicky	Captain Kellersperg	René Deltgen, Lotte Lang
Die gelbe Flagge	1937	Gerhard Lamprecht	Peter Diercksen	Olga Chekhova, Dorothea Wieck, Rudolf Klein-Rogge
The Man Who Was Sherlock Holmes	1937	Karl Hartl	Morris Flint	Heinz Rühmann, Marieluise Claudius, Paul Bildt
Sergeant Berry	1938	Herbert Selpin	Sergeant Mecki Berry	Alexander Golling, Herbert Hübner
Travelling People	1938	Jacques Feyder	Fernand	Françoise Rosay, Camilla Horn
Water for Canitoga	1939	Herbert Selpin	Captain Oliver Montstuart/Nicolsen	Charlotte Susa, Hilde Sessak
A Man Astray	1940	Herbert Selpin	John Percival Patterson	Charlotte Thiele, Hilde Weissner
Trenck the Pandur	1940	Herbert Selpin	Baron Von Der Trenck	Käthe Dorsch, Sybille Schmitz, Hilde Weissner
Carl Peters	1941	Herbert Selpin	Carl Peters	Herbert Hübner, Fritz Odemar
Münchhausen	1943	Josef von Báky	Baron Münchhausen	Brigitte Horney, Ilse Werner, Ferdinand Marian
Port of Freedom	1944	Helmut Käutner	Hannes Kroeger	Ilse Werner, Hans Söhnker
Shiva und die Galgenblume	1945	Hans Steinhoff	Dietrich Dongen	Paul Wegener (unfinished film)
And the Heavens Above Us	1947	Josef von Báky	Hans Richter	Paul Edwin Roth, Lotte Koch
The White Hell of Pitz Palu	1950	Rolf Hansen	Dr. Johannes Jensen	Liselotte Pulver, Adrian Hoven
Chased by the Devil	1950	Viktor Tourjansky	Dr. Blank	Willy Birgel, Lil Dagover, Heidemarie Hatheyer
Bluebeard	1951	Christian-Jaque	Bluebeard	Cécile Aubry, Fritz Kortner
Nights on the Road	1952	Rudolf Jugert	Heinrich Schlueter	Hildegard Knef, Marius Goring
Jonny Saves Nebrador	1953	Rudolf Jugert	Jonny / General Oronta	Margot Hielscher, Peter Pasetti
Captain Bay-Bay	1953	Helmut Käutner	Captain Bay-Bay	Bum Krüger, Lotte Koch
On the Reeperbahn at Half Past Midnight	1954	Wolfgang Liebeneiner	Hannes Wedderkamp	Heinz Rühmann, Gustav Knuth
Ten on Every Finger	1954	Erik Ode	Himself	Germaine Damar, Loni Heuser
The Last Man	1955	Harald Braun	Karl Knesebeck	Romy Schneider, Rudolf Forster, Joachim Fuchsberger
Before Sundown	1956	Gottfried Reinhardt	Mathias Clausen	Annemarie Düringer, Martin Held
Engaged to Death	1957	Romolo Marcellini	Lorenzo	Sylva Koscina, Rik Battaglia
The Mad Bomberg	1957	Rolf Thiele	Baron Gisbert von Bomberg	Marion Michael, Gert Fröbe, Harald Juhnke
The Heart of St. Pauli	1957	Eugen York	Captain Jonny Jensen	Hansjörg Felmy, Gert Fröbe
The Copper	1958	Eugen York	Otto Friedrich Dennert	Hansjörg Felmy, Werner Peters, Horst Frank
It Happened Only Once	1958	Géza von Bolváry	Himself	Emmy Burg, Stanislav Ledinek
Man in the River	1958	Eugen York	Paul Hinrichs	Gina Albert, Hans Nielsen
Thirteen Old Donkeys	1958	Hans Deppe	Josef Krapp	Marianne Hoppe, Karin Dor, Werner Peters
Kein Engel ist so rein	1960	Wolfgang Becker	Dr. Zilinsky	Sabine Sinjen, Peter Kraus, Horst Frank

== Songs (selection) ==
1931

- Das ist die Liebe der Matrosen (from picture Bomben auf Monte Carlo)
- Kind, du brauchst nicht weinen (from picture Der Draufgänger)

1932

- Flieger, grüß' mit mir die Sonne (from picture F. P. 1 antwortet nicht)
- Hoppla, jetzt komm' ich (from picture Der Sieger)
- Komm' auf die Schaukel, Luise (from stage play Liliom)
- Komm und spiel mit mir (from picture Quick)

1933

- "Mein Gorilla hat 'ne Villa im Zoo" (from picture Today Is the Day)

1936

- "In meinem Herzen Schatz, da ist für viele Platz" (from picture Savoy-Hotel 217)

1937

- "Jawohl, meine Herrn" [with Heinz Rühmann] (from picture Der Mann, der Sherlock Holmes war)

1939

- "Good bye, Jonny" (from picture Wasser für Canitoga)

1944

- "La Paloma" (from picture Große Freiheit Nr. 7)
- "Auf der Reeperbahn nachts um halb eins" (from picture Große Freiheit Nr. 7)

1952

- "Kleine weiße Möwe" (from picture Käpt'n Bay-Bay)
- "Nimm mich mit, Kapitän, auf die Reise" (from picture Käpt'n Bay-Bay)

1954

- "Auf der Reeperbahn nachts um halb eins" (from picture Auf der Reeperbahn nachts um halb eins)
- "Komm auf die Schaukel, Luise" (from picture Auf der Reeperbahn nachts um halb eins)

1957

- "Das Herz von St. Pauli" (from picture Das Herz von St. Pauli)

1959

- "Mein Junge, halt die Füße still" (from picture Dreizehn alte Esel)

== Bibliography ==
- Joachim Cadenbach: Hans Albers. Berlin: Universitas-Verlag, 1975, ISBN 3-8004-0818-X
- Eberhard Spieß: Hans Albers. Eine Filmographie. Herausgegeben von Hilmar Hoffmann und Walter Schobert in Zusammenarbeit mit dem Deutschen Institut für Filmkunde, Wiesbaden. Verlag: Frankfurt am Main: Kommunales Kino, 1977
- Uwe-Jens Schumann: Hans Albers – seine Filme, sein Leben. (= Heyne-Filmbibliothek, Band 18) München: Heyne, 1980, ISBN 3-453-86018-7
- Hans-Christoph Blumenberg: In meinem Herzen, Schatz … Die Lebensreise des Schauspielers und Sängers Hans Albers . Frankfurt am Main: Fischer-Taschenbuch-Verlag, 1981, ISBN 3-596-10662-1
- Michaela Krützen: Hans Albers: Eine deutsche Karriere. Berlin; Weinheim: Beltz Quadriga 1995
- Michaela Krützen: „Gruppe 1: Positiv“ Carl Zuckmayers Beurteilungen über Hans Albers und Heinz Rühmann. In: Carl Zuckmayer Jahrbuch/ hg. von Günther Nickel. Göttingen 2002, S. 179-227
- Matthias Wegner: Hans Albers. Ellert & Richter, Hamburg 2005 (Hamburger Köpfe) ISBN 3-8319-0224-0
