= In the Castle by the Lake =

- Directed by: Eugen Burg
- Written by: Max Jungk
- Produced by: Viggo Larsen; Wanda Treumann
- Starring: Wanda Treumann; Reinhold Schünzel; Karl Beckersachs
- Production company: Treumann-Larsen Film
- Distributed by: Treumann-Larsen Film
- Release date: 1 May 1918
- Country: Germany
- Languages: Silent; German intertitles

In the Castle by the Lake (German: Im Schloß am See) is a 1918 German silent drama film directed by Eugen Burg and starring Wanda Treumann, Reinhold Schünzel, and Karl Beckersachs.

== Cast ==
- Wanda Treumann as Ilka Terfani
- Reinhold Schünzel as Erich von Strehsen
- Curt Bauer as Gutsinspektor
- Karl Beckersachs as Paul von Wiecken
- Eugen Burg as Baron Heidecker
- Rudolf Döllong as Bodo
- Cläre Praetz as Annemarie

== Bibliography ==
- Bock, Hans-Michael & Bergfelder, Tim. The Concise CineGraph. Encyclopedia of German Cinema. Berghahn Books, 2009.
