= Franz Porten =

German actor and film director

- Born: 23 August 1859; Zeltingen-Rachtig, Kingdom of Prussia
- Died: 21 May 1932 (aged 72); Berlin, Germany
- Occupations: Actor, film director
- Years active: 1907-1924

Franz Porten (23 August 1859 – 21 May 1932) was a German actor and film director. He was the father of actress and film producer Henny Porten, screenwriter, actress, and director Rosa Porten, and actor Fritz Porten.

== Filmography ==
=== Director ===
- Meissner Porzellan (1906) – short film
- Der Trompeter von Säckingen (1907)
- Othello (1907)
- Schaukellied (1908)
- Lohengrin (1908)
- Der Bettelstudent (1908)
- Funiculi Funicula (1908)
- Tannhäuser (1908) – questionable
- Margarete (1909)
- Andreas Hofers Tod (1909)
- Der Brief an den lieben Gott (1909)
- Der Freischütz (1909) – questionable
- Herbstmanöver (1909) – questionable
- Hexenlied (1909)
- Herzensdieb (1909)
- Die Kleine Baronesse (1909) – questionable
- Stolzenfels am Rhein (1909) – questionable
- Spinnlied (1909) – questionable
- Im Fasching (1910)
- Die Kitzlige Jungfrau (1910)
- Lohengrin (1910)
- Weh, dass wir scheiden müssen (1910)
- Das Geheimnis der Toten (1910)
- Karl der Grosse (1911)
- Theodor Körner (1912) – also screenwriter
- Aus Deutschlands Ruhmestagen (1913)
- Der Film von der Königin Luise - I (1913) – also screenwriter
- Der Film von der Königin Luise - II (1913) – also screenwriter
- Der Film von der Königin Luise - III (1913) – also screenwriter
- Bubi, der Unverbesserliche (1915)
- Tyrannenherrschaft (1916)
- Der Trompeter von Säkkingen (1918) – also screenwriter
- The Secret of Wera Baranska (1919)

=== Actor ===
- Der Trompeter von Säckingen, Jung-Werner (1907)
- Othello (1907), Othello
- Der Bettelstudent (1908), Oberst Ollendorf
- Tannhäuser (1908), Wolfram von Eschenbach
- Die Perlenfischer (1908)
- Lohengrin (1908), König Heinrich der Vogler
- Die Macht des Schicksals (1908)
- Margarete (1909)
