= Three Maxims =

- Australian newspaper ad
- Directed by: Herbert Wilcox
- Written by: Nicolas Farkas; Anthony Kimmins; Herman J. Mankiewicz; Austin Melford; E.G. Valentine
- Produced by: Herbert Wilcox
- Starring: Anna Neagle; Tullio Carminati; Leslie Banks; Arthur Finn
- Cinematography: Jan Stallich; Freddie Young
- Music by: Geraldo
- Production company: Herbert Wilcox Productions
- Distributed by: General Film Distributors
- Release date: June 1936
- Running time: 70 minutes
- Country: United Kingdom
- Language: English

Three Maxims is a 1936 British drama film directed by Herbert Wilcox and starring Anna Neagle, Tullio Carminati and Leslie Banks. It was released in the United States under the alternative title The Show Goes On. Separate French and German language versions were filmed 1935 in Paris. The film's sets were designed by Wilcox's regular art director Lawrence P. Williams.

== Premise ==
A love triangle causes major disruption to the harmony of a trapeze act.

== Cast ==
- Anna Neagle as Pat
- Tullio Carminati as Toni
- Leslie Banks as Mac
- Arthur Finn as Hiram K. Winston
- Olive Blakeney as Mrs Winston
- Miki Hood as Valentine
- Anthony Ireland as Val
- Nicolas Koline as Niki
- Gaston Palmer as Juggler
- Leonard Snelling as Prodigy
- Winifred Oughton as Prodigy's Mother
- Beatrix Fielden-Kaye as Madame Thomas
- Laurence Hanray as Thomas
- Tarva Penna as Doctor
- Vincent Holman as Cafe Proprietor
- Henry Caine as Stage Manager
- Horace Hodges as Mike

== Other film versions ==
- Variétés (1935) with Jean Gabin and Annabella
- Variety (1935) with Hans Albers and Annabella

== Bibliography ==
- Low, Rachael. Filmmaking in 1930s Britain. George Allen & Unwin, 1985.
- Wood, Linda. British Films, 1927–1939. British Film Institute, 1986.
