= Werner Schumacher =

German actor

Werner Schumacher (born 4 May 1921 in Berlin - died 18 April 2004 in Bremen) was a German actor. From 1971 until 1986 he starred in the Süddeutscher Rundfunk version of the popular television crime series Tatort.

== Selected filmography ==
- The Devil's General (1955) - 2. SS-Wachmann
- The Captain from Köpenick (1956) - 2.Gefreiter
- Three Birch Trees on the Heath (1956)
- The Zurich Engagement (1957) - (uncredited)
- Von allen geliebt (1957)
- The Heart of St. Pauli (1957) - Seemann (uncredited)
- Doctor Crippen Lives (1958)
- Grabenplatz 17 (1958)
- Der Schinderhannes (1958) - Leutnant der Gefängniswache
- The Rest Is Silence (1959) - Werks-Fahrer
- The Liar (1961) - Goliath
