= The Liar (1961 film) =

1961 film

- Directed by: Ladislao Vajda
- Written by: A. B. Shiffrin (play Eleven Lives of Leo); Hans Jacoby &; István Békeffy
- Produced by: Walter Koppel (producer); Gyula Trebitsch (producer); Helmut Ungerland (executive producer)
- Starring: See below
- Cinematography: Günther Anders
- Edited by: Hermann Haller
- Music by: Siegfried Franz
- Release date: 1961
- Running time: 90 minutes
- Country: West Germany
- Language: German

The Liar (German: Der Lügner) is a 1961 West German film directed by Ladislao Vajda. It was shot at the Wandsbek Studios in Hamburg.

== Premise ==
The film is an adaptation from The Eleven Lives of Leo by A. B. Shiffrin.

== Cast ==
- Heinz Rühmann as Sebastian Schumann
- Giulia Follina as Nicky
- Annemarie Düringer as Annemarie Karsten
- Blandine Ebinger as Fräulein Kriese
- Gustav Knuth as Rotbarth
- Werner Hinz as Sperber
- Joseph Offenbach as Bettler
- Siegfried Wischnewski as Kommissar
- Werner Schumacher as Goliath
- Joachim Wolff as Autovermieter
- Balduin Baas as Wiedemayer
- Günther Jerschke as Inspektor
- Herbert Weissbach as Vorsitzender
- Stanislav Ledinek as Russischer Delegierter
- Ida Turay as Kundin
- Kurt Alexis as Luftballonmann
- Willy Maertens
