= Three from Variety =

- Directed by: Kurt Neumann
- Written by: Kurt E. Walter
- Produced by: Robert Leistenschneider; Franz Tappers
- Starring: Ingrid Andree; Peter Pasetti; Paul Dahlke
- Cinematography: Willy Winterstein
- Music by: Hans-Martin Majewski
- Production company: Standard-Filmverleih
- Distributed by: Deutsche London-Film
- Release date: 21 December 1954
- Running time: 94 minutes
- Country: West Germany
- Language: German

Three from Variety (German: Drei vom Varieté) is a 1954 West German drama film directed by Kurt Neumann and starring Ingrid Andree, Peter Pasetti and Paul Dahlke. It is based on the 1912 novel The Oath of Stephan Huller by Felix Hollaender which has inspired a number of film adaptations.

The film's sets were designed by the art directors Ernst H. Albrecht and Paul Markwitz. It was shot at the Göttingen Studios.

== Synopsis ==
The performers of a high wire circus act become involved in a love triangle.

== Cast ==
- Ingrid Andree as Jeanine Wagner
- Peter Pasetti as Luigi Borella
- Paul Dahlke as Stobrowski, Agent
- Mady Rahl as Valerie Latour
- Erich Schellow as Alexis Wagner
- Franco Andrei as Renato Oscar
- Heinz Engelmann as Charles Latour
- Walter Janssen as Timm Broders
- Willy Maertens as Gerichtsvorsitzender
- Günther Jerschke as Schumann, Inspizient
- Eugen Dumont as Mahnke, Pförtner
- Oskar Dimroth as Prosecutor
- Kurt Fuß as Zirkusdirektor
- Holger Hagen as Artist mit Affe
- Robert Meyn as Jeanine's defense lawyer
- Karin Remsing as Vera, Artistin
- Fritz Schmiedel
- Gert Schäfer
- Paul Hühn
- Eberhard Itzenplitz

== Bibliography ==
- Bock, Hans-Michael & Bergfelder, Tim. The Concise CineGraph. Encyclopedia of German Cinema. Berghahn Books, 2009.
