= Oskar Marion =

Austrian actor

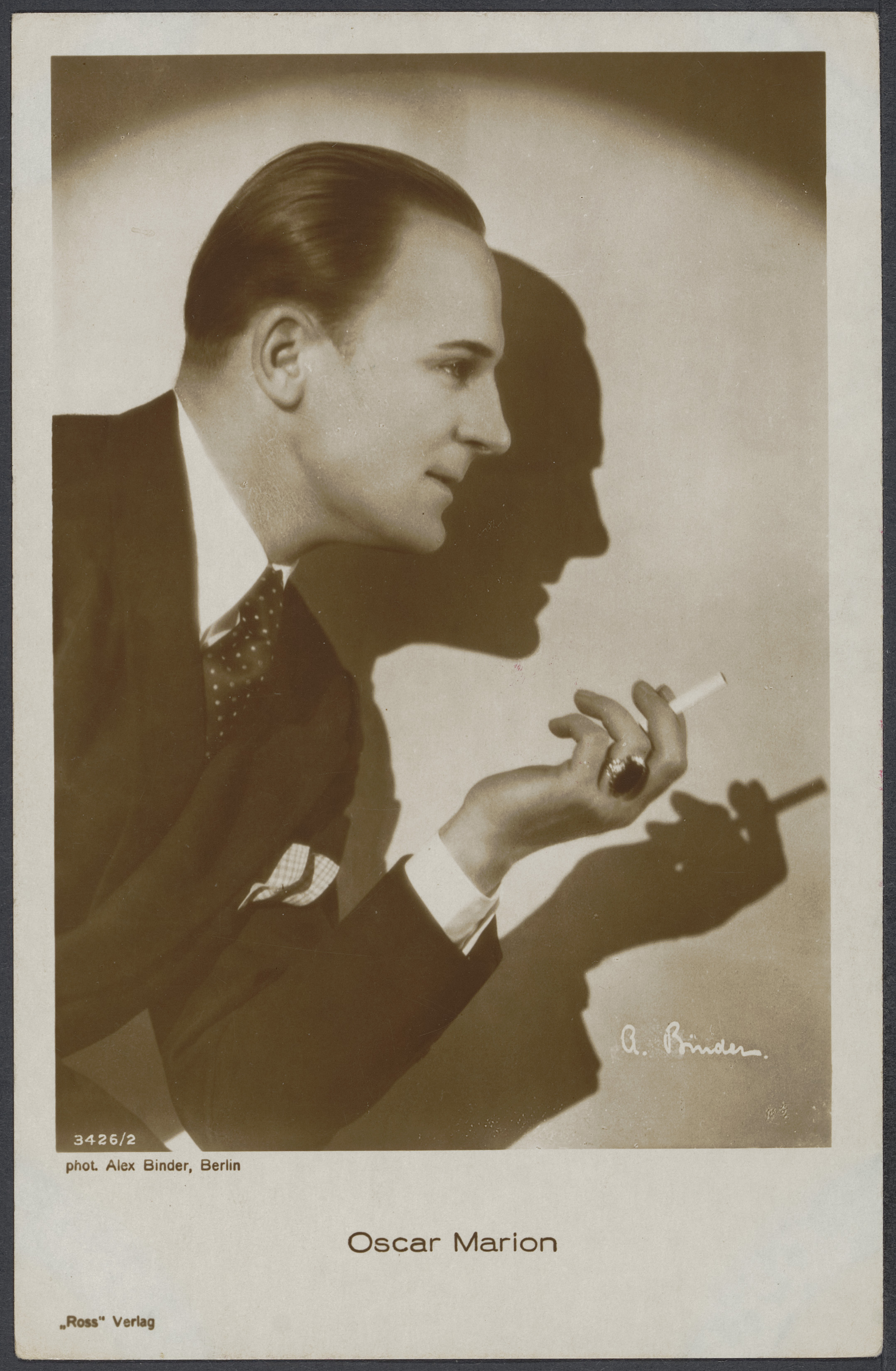
- Photography by Alexander Binder.
- Born: Oskar Viktor Lepka; 2 April 1896; Brno, Austria-Hungary
- Died: March 1986 (aged 89); Munich, West Germany
- Occupation: Film actor
- Years active: 1919–1940

Oskar Marion (2 April 1896 – March 1986) was an Austrian film actor.

== Life ==
Born as Oskar Viktor Lepka in Brno on 2 April 1896. His parents were physician Antonín Lepka and Žofie Lepková (née Müller). Marion went to study medicine to Vienna, but after 1 year he had to enlist to be an ambulance driver, when World War I broke out. After the war ended he decided to become an actor. He worked at Wiener Kammerspiele, Brno City Theatre, Estates Theatre and several theatres in Berlin. From 1919 to 1940 he acted mostly in German and Austrian movies. He had a few roles in Czech movies, because he was fluent in both German and Czech. After the end of his acting career, he worked as an assistant director and producer in West Germany.

== Selected filmography ==
- The Loves of Käthe Keller (1919)
- The Secret of the Scaffold (1919)
- Colonel Chabert (1920)
- At War in the Diamond Fields (1921)
- Die rote Nacht (1921)
- The Favourite of the Queen (1922)
- The Men of Frau Clarissa (1922)
- Monna Vanna (1922)
- Judith (1923)
- The Woman from the Orient (1923)
- Frauenmoral (1923)
- The Heart of Lilian Thorland (1924)
- Taras Bulba (1924)
- Struggle for the Soil (1925)
- Lightning (1925)
- My Friend the Chauffeur (1926)
- Fedora (1926)
- Little Inge and Her Three Fathers (1926)
- Valencia (1927)
- The Dashing Archduke (1927)
- Linden Lady on the Rhine (1927)
- Did You Fall in Love Along the Beautiful Rhine? (1927)
- The Lone Eagle (1927)
- The Csardas Princess (1927)
- Storm Tide (1927)
- Two Red Roses (1928)
- The Foreign Legionnaire (1928)
- Waterloo (1929)
- Lady in the Spa (1929)
- Call of the Blood (1929)
- Andreas Hofer (1929)
- The Organist at St. Vitus' Cathedral (1929)
- Gigolo (1930)
- Marriage in Name Only (1930)
- The Deed of Andreas Harmer (1930)
- Sunday of Life (1931)
- When the Soldiers (1931)
- Circus Life (1931)
- The Good Soldier Schweik (1931)
- Road to Rio (1931)
- No More Love (1931)
- Drei von der Kavallerie (1932)
- Marschall Vorwärts (1932)
- Professor Cupidon (1933)
- The Ideal Schoolmaster (1933)
- The Judas of Tyrol (1933)
- The Hymn of Leuthen (1933)
- Drei Kaiserjäger (1933)
- The Poacher from Egerland (1934)
- Petersburger Nächte (1935)
- Hundred Days (1935)
- Quarrymen (1936)
- Fridericus (1937)
- Ein Robinson (1940)
- A Heart Beats for You (1949)
- Two in One Suit (1950)
