= Colonel Chabert (1920 film) =

1920 film

- Directed by: Eugen Burg
- Written by: Robert Heymann
- Based on: Colonel Chabert (novel) by Honoré de Balzac
- Produced by: Viggo Larsen; Wanda Treumann
- Starring: Eugen Berg
- Production company: Treumann-Larsen-Film
- Distributed by: Treumann-Larsen-Film
- Release date: 1920
- Country: Germany
- Languages: Silent; German intertitles

Colonel Chabert (German: Oberst Chabert) is a 1920 German silent historical film directed by and starring Eugen Burg. It is an adaptation of Honoré de Balzac's 1832 novel Colonel Chabert.

== Cast ==
- Eugen Burg as Oberst Chabert
- Wanda Treumann as Doppelrolle
- Oskar Marion
- Hans Ahrens
- Max Laurence

== Bibliography ==
- Kapczynski, Jennifer M.; Richardson, Michael D., eds. (2014) [2012]. A New History of German Cinema. New York: Boydell & Brewer. ISBN 978-1-58046-854-1.
