= Today I Was With Frieda =

1928 film

- Directed by: Siegfried Philippi
- Written by: Jim Cowler; Siegfried Philippi
- Produced by: Gustav Althoff
- Starring: Hans Albers; Mary Parker; Evi Eva
- Cinematography: Max Grix
- Production company: Albö-Film
- Distributed by: Albö-Film
- Release date: December 1928
- Country: Germany
- Languages: Silent; German intertitles

Today I Was With Frieda (German: Heut' war ich bei der Frieda) is a 1928 German silent film directed by Siegfried Philippi and starring Hans Albers, Mary Parker and Evi Eva.

The film's sets were designed by the art director Robert A. Dietrich.

== Cast ==
- Hans Albers as Eric Hahn
- Mary Parker as Frieda Engel
- Evi Eva as Leonie Heuser
- Hans Brausewetter
- Henry Bender as Otto Grimmelsbach
- Robert Garrison as M. Heuser
- Margarete Kupfer as Mme. Heuser
- Otto Reinwald

== Bibliography ==
- Bock, Hans-Michael & Bergfelder, Tim. The Concise CineGraph. Encyclopedia of German Cinema. Berghahn Books, 2009.
