= Madeleine (1919 film) =

1919 film

- Directed by: Siegfried Philippi
- Written by: Siegfried Philippi
- Produced by: Ria Jende
- Starring: Ria Jende; Eduard von Winterstein; Hans Albers
- Cinematography: Friedrich Weinmann
- Production company: Ria Jende-Film
- Release date: 26 November 1919
- Country: Germany
- Languages: Silent; German intertitles

Madeleine is a 1919 German silent film directed by Siegfried Philippi and starring Ria Jende, Eduard von Winterstein and Hermann Vallentin.

The film's sets were designed by the art director Siegfried Wroblewsky.

== Cast ==
- Ria Jende
- Eduard von Winterstein
- Hermann Vallentin
- Heinrich Schroth
- Hans Albers
- Emil Mamelok
- Rosa Valetti
- Magda Madeleine
- Anneliese Halbe
- Antonie Jaeckel
- Fritz Beckmann
- Henry Bender
- Adolphe Engers
- Olga Engl
- Rudolf Klein-Rhoden
- Emil Sondermann

== Bibliography ==
- Hans-Michael Bock and Tim Bergfelder. The Concise Cinegraph: An Encyclopedia of German Cinema. Berghahn Books, 2009.
