= The Secret of the Scaffold =

- Directed by: Eugen Burg
- Written by: Robert Heymann; Auguste Villiers de l'Isle-Adam (short story Le Secret de l'échafaud)
- Produced by: Viggo Larsen; Wanda Treumann
- Starring: Wanda Treumann; Oskar Marion; Eugen Burg
- Cinematography: Josef Dietze
- Production company: Treumann-Larsen-Film
- Distributed by: Treumann-Larsen-Film
- Release date: 1919
- Country: Germany
- Languages: Silent; German intertitles

The Secret of the Scaffold (German: Das Geheimnis des Schafotts) is a 1919 German silent historical drama film directed by Eugen Burg.

The film's sets were designed by the art director Mathieu Oostermann.

== Main cast ==
- Eugen Burg
- Oskar Marion
- Wanda Treumann
