= The Oath of Stephan Huller (1912 film) =

- Directed by: Viggo Larsen
- Written by: Viggo Larsen
- Based on: The Oath of Stephan Huller by Felix Hollaender
- Starring: Viggo Larsen; Wanda Treumann; Fritz Schroeter
- Cinematography: Max Lutze
- Production company: Vitascope
- Release date: 25 May 1912
- Country: Germany
- Languages: Silent; German intertitles

The Oath of Stephan Huller (German: Der Eid des Stephan Huller) is a 1912 German silent drama film directed by Viggo Larsen and starring Larsen and Wanda Treumann. It is an adaptation of the 1912 novel of the same title by Felix Hollaender.

== Cast ==
- Viggo Larsen as Boss Huller
- Wanda Treumann as Bertha-Marie
- Fritz Schroeter as Artinelli

== Bibliography ==
- Halle, Randall & McCarthy, Margaret. Light Motives: German Popular Film in Perspective. Wayne State University Press, 2003.
