= Ingrid Andree =

German actress

- Born: 19 January 1931 (age 95); Hamburg, Germany
- Occupation: Actress
- Years active: 1951–present

Ingrid Andree (born Ingrid Tilly Unverhau on 19 January 1931) is a German actress. She began her career in 1948 in Hamburg and in 1950 appeared at the Thaliatheater, Hamburg. She has made many stage appearances and also appeared in more than 50 films and television shows since 1951. She starred in the film The Rest Is Silence, which was entered into the 9th Berlin International Film Festival.

== Selected filmography ==
- Professor Nachtfalter (1951)
- Oh, You Dear Fridolin (1952)
- Love's Awakening (1953)
- Love is Forever (1954)
- The Crazy Clinic (1954)
- Three from Variety (1954)
- Sergeant Borck (1955)
- Your Life Guards (1955)
- The Ambassador's Wife (1955)
- You Can No Longer Remain Silent (1955)
- Engagement at Wolfgangsee (1956)
- My Brother Joshua (1956)
- A Piece of Heaven (1957)
- Confessions of Felix Krull (1957)
- Peter Voss, Thief of Millions (1958)
- The Rest Is Silence (1959)
- Storm in a Water Glass (1960)
- Nachts ging das Telefon (1962)
- Tears of Stone (1995)
- Transfer (2010)
