= The Oath of Stephan Huller (1921 film) =

1921 film

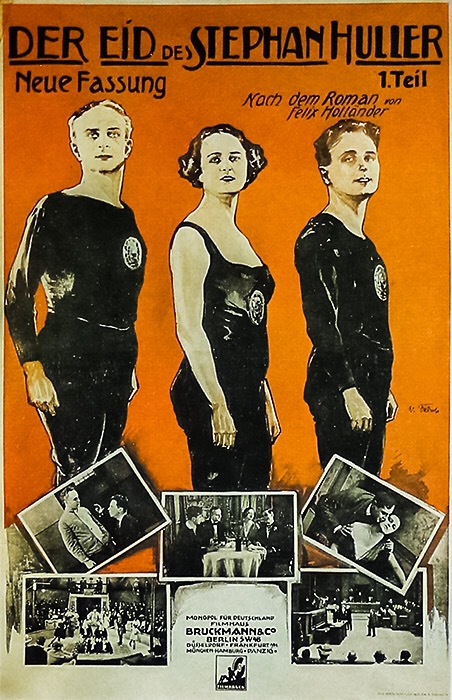
- Directed by: Reinhard Bruck
- Written by: Reinhard Bruck
- Based on: The Oath of Stephan Huller by Felix Hollaender
- Produced by: Jules Greenbaum
- Starring: Anton Edthofer; Hanni Weisse; Alexander Areuss
- Cinematography: George Greenbaum; Ernst Krohn
- Production company: Greenbaum-Film
- Release date: 31 May 1921
- Country: Germany
- Languages: Silent; German intertitles

The Oath of Stephan Huller (German: Der Eid des Stephan Huller) is a 1921 German silent drama film directed by Reinhard Bruck and starring Anton Edthofer, Hanni Weisse and Alexander Areuss. It is based on the 1912 novel of the same title by Felix Hollaender.

The film's sets were designed by the art director Siegfried Wroblewsky.

== Cast ==
- Anton Edthofer as Friedrich Huller
- Hanni Weisse as Frau Huller
- Alexander Areuss as Sohn Stephan Huller
- Arthur Bergen as Verführer
- Carl de Vogt
- Hugo Döblin as Agent
- Max Pohl as Geschworener

== Bibliography ==
- Bock, Hans-Michael & Bergfelder, Tim. The Concise CineGraph. Encyclopedia of German Cinema. Berghahn Books, 2009.
