= Nixchen (1926 film) =

1926 film

- Directed by: Kurt Blachy
- Written by: Hans von Kahlenberg (novel); Fanny Carlsen
- Starring: Hans Albers; Heinrich Peer; Olga Limburg
- Cinematography: Willy Großstück
- Production company: Naxos-Film
- Distributed by: Naxos-Film
- Release date: 17 December 1926
- Country: Germany
- Languages: Silent; German intertitles

Nixchen is a 1926 German silent film directed by Kurt Blachy and starring Hans Albers, Heinrich Peer and Olga Limburg. It is based on a novel of the same title by Hans von Kahlenberg.

The film's art direction was by Botho Hoefer and August Rinaldi.

== Cast ==
- Hans Albers as Lutz von Lonna - Lawyer
- Heinrich Peer as Baumeister Georg Wessel
- Olga Limburg as Marion, seine Frau
- Xenia Desni as Lilly - deren Tochter, das Nixchen
- Harry Liedtke as Esswein - Fabrikant
- Karl Falkenberg as Birk - Herrenreiter
- Adele Sandrock as Frau von Bremersdorf, Wessels Schwester
- Ernst Rückert as Achim von Bremersdorf - ihr Sohn
- Georg Burghardt as Rockweiler - Prokurist bei Wessel
- Hermann Picha as Müller - Kanzlist bei Wessel
- Karl Harbacher as Spitz - Schreiber bei Lonna

== Bibliography ==
- Parish, James Robert. Film Actors Guide. Scarecrow Press, 1977.
