= Siegfried Philippi =

German screenwriter and film director

- Born: 31 July 1871; Lübeck, Germany
- Died: 29 February 1936 (aged 64); Berlin, Germany
- Occupations: Director, Writer
- Years active: 1916–1932 (film )

Siegfried Philippi, born Siegfried Salomon Philipp (31 July 1871 – 29 February 1936) was a German screenwriter and film director.

== Selected filmography ==
- Mountain Air (1917)
- Madeleine (1919)
- Dancer of Death (1920)
- The Black Spider (1921)
- Sunken Worlds (1922)
- Playing with Destiny (1924)
- The Creature (1924)
- Letters Which Never Reached Him (1925)
- The Mill at Sanssouci (1926)
- That Was Heidelberg on Summer Nights (1927)
- Circle of Lovers (1927)
- On the Banks of the River Weser (1927)
- Autumn on the Rhine (1928)
- Today I Was With Frieda (1928)
- The Lord of the Tax Office (1929)
- The Lady from Argentina (1928)
- Beware of Loose Women (1929)

== Bibliography ==
- Grange, William. Cultural Chronicle of the Weimar Republic. Scarecrow Press, 2008.
- Weniger, Kay. Das große Personenlexikon des Films. Schwarzkopf & Schwarzkopf 2001.
