= Ria Jende =

Belgian actor

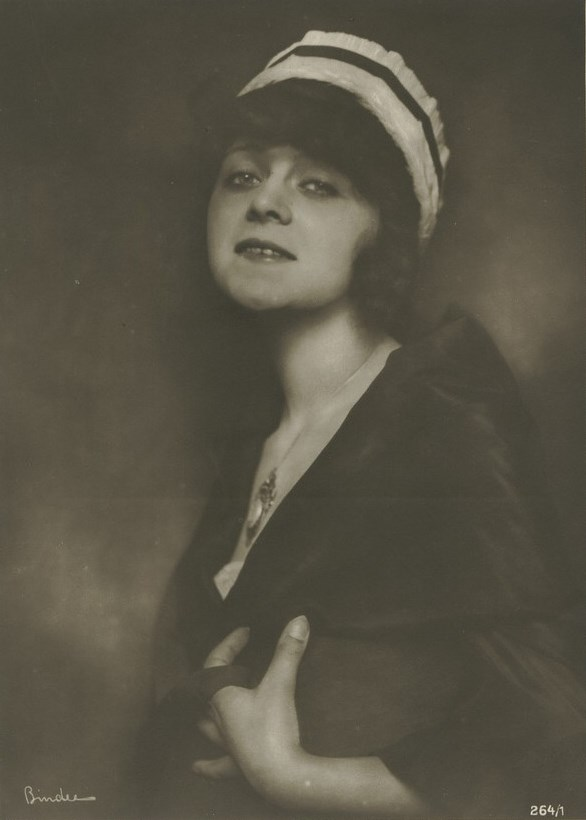
- Photograph by Alexander Binder
- Born: 29 October 1898; Brussels, Belgium
- Died: After 1927
- Occupation: Actress
- Years active: 1912–1925 (film)

Ria Jende (October 29, 1898 – after 1927) was a Belgian-German film actress during the silent era. She also produced three of her own films.

Originally from Brussels she moved to Germany at a young age, and began working in the German film industry before the First World War after having been discovered in Berlin by Oskar Messter. She enjoyed particular fame during the early 1920s, but drifted out of public awareness and the year of her death is unknown.

== Selected filmography ==
- The Blue Mauritius (1918)
- The Devil (1918)
- The Dancer (1919)
- The Last Sun Son (1919)
- The Secret of the American Docks (1919)
- The Princess of Urbino (1919)
- The World Champion (1919)
- The Panther Bride (1919)
- The Japanese Woman (1919)
- Only a Servant (1919)
- The Golden Lie (1919)
- The Heart of Casanova (1919)
- The Bodega of Los Cuerros (1919)
- Madeleine (1919)
- The Gallant King (1920)
- Schwarzwaldmädel (1920)
- Nixchen (1920)
- Darwin (1920)
- The Secret of Satana Magarita (1921)
- Sunken Worlds (1922)
- The Adventures of Captain Hasswell (1925)

== Bibliography ==
- Grange, William. Cultural Chronicle of the Weimar Republic. Scarecrow Press, 2008.
