= Nixchen (1920 film) =

1920 film

- Directed by: Paul Legband
- Written by: Franz W. Koebner; Hans von Kahlenberg
- Starring: Georg Alexander; Olga Engl; Ria Jende
- Production company: Luna-Film
- Distributed by: Luna-Film
- Release date: 1920
- Country: Germany
- Languages: Silent; German intertitles

Nixchen is a 1920 German silent film directed by Paul Legband and starring Georg Alexander, Olga Engl and Ria Jende.

== Cast ==
In alphabetical order

- Georg Alexander as Schriftsteller
- Olga Engl
- Ria Jende as Nixchen
- Hans Mühlhofer
- Ernst Stahl-Nachbaur as Herbert Gröndal

== Bibliography ==
- Brian Keith-Smith. An encyclopedia of German women writers, 1900-1933. E. Mellen Press, 1998.
