= Viggo Larsen =

Danish actor (1880–1957)

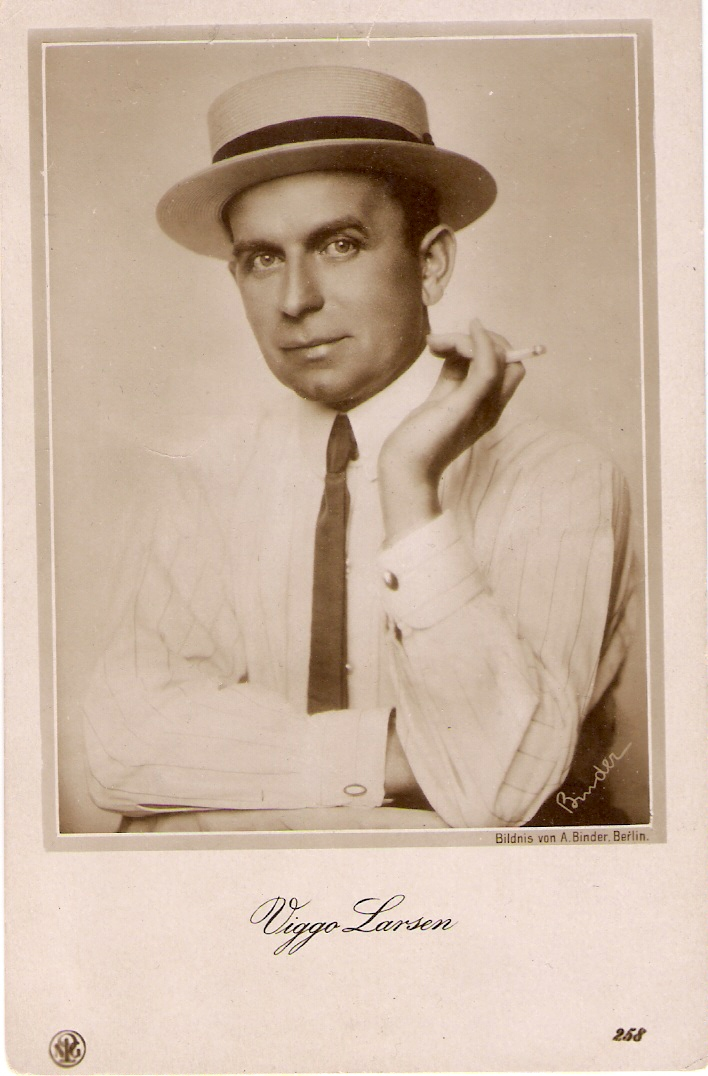
- Pre-1929 German Postcard of Viggo Larsen made by Alexander Binder.
- Born: 14 August 1880; Copenhagen, Denmark
- Died: 6 January 1957 (aged 76); Copenhagen, Denmark
- Occupations: Actor; Film director
- Years active: 1906-1942

Viggo Larsen (14 August 1880 – 6 January 1957) was a Danish film actor, director and producer from the early silent era to the 'talkies'. He appeared in 140 films between 1906 and 1942. He also directed 235 films between 1906 and 1921. He was born and died in Copenhagen, Denmark. He has been criticized for having starred in the 1942 Nazi-propaganda movie G.P.U.

== Selected filmography ==
- Løvejagten (1907)
- Sherlock Holmes in Danger (1908)
- Sherlock Holmes II: Raffles Escaped from Prison (1909)
- Sherlock Holmes III: The Detective's Adventure in the Gas Cellar (1909)
- Sherlock Holmes IV: The Singer's Diamonds (1909)
- Sherlock Holmes V: Cab Number 519 (1909)
- Sherlock Holmes VI: The Grey Lady (1909)
- Ørneægget (1910)
- Arsène Lupin contra Sherlock Holmes (1910)
- The Oath of Stephan Huller (1912)
- Frank Hansen's Fortune (1917)
- The Newest Star of Variety (1917)
- The Coquette (1917)
- Not of the Woman Born (1918)
- In the Castle by the Lake (1918)
- Film Kathi (1918)
- The Adventure of a Ball Night (1918)
- The Son of Hannibal (1918)
- The Secret of Wera Baranska (1919)
- The Secret of the Scaffold (1919)
- A Night in Paradise (1919)
- Colonel Chabert (1920)
- The Pearl of the Orient (1921)
- The Fire Ship (1922)
- Hallig Hooge (1923)
- Orient (1924)
- The Doll Queen (1925)
- Stronger Than Regulations (1936)
- Togger (1937)
- The Holm Murder Case (1938)
- Clarissa (1941)
- G.P.U (1942)
- Diesel (1942)
