= Hans Schomburgk =

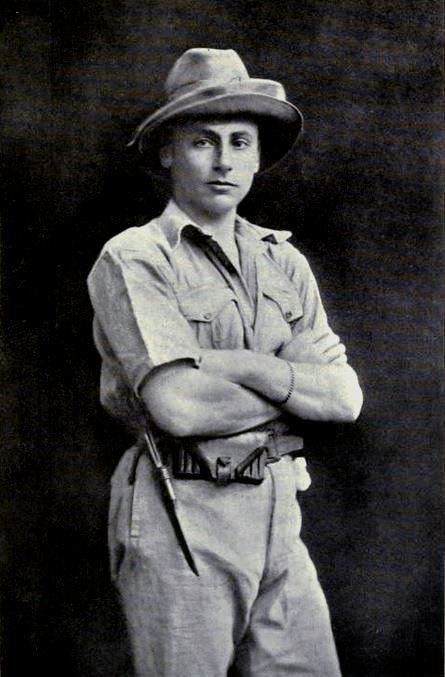
Schomburgk in 1913

Hans Schomburgk (October 28, 1880 in Hamburg – July 27, 1967 in Berlin) was a German adventurer, filmmaker and until 1912 a big-game hunter.

== Biography ==
Schomburgk participated in a number of expeditions throughout sub-Saharan Africa. In addition to being a big-game hunter, he also procured African animals for European zoos, including such curiosities as the pygmy hippopotamus. Schomburgk is credited as being the first European to visit the Schikande River and Lake Sengwe of southern Angola. Also, he took part in the manufacture of the first map of western Liberia.

Schomburgk is remembered today for his "ethnodramas" filmed on location in Africa. From 1922 until 1925 he was married to German actress Meg Gehrts (1891–1966), who was featured in his Weiße Göttin der Wangora (The White Goddess of the Wangora), a movie filmed in Togoland in 1913.

The following list contains some of Schomburgk's better known African films:

- Im deutschen Sudan (1913/1917) – In "German Sudan".
- Tropengift (1919) – Tropical poison.
- At War in the Diamond Fields (1921).
- Eine Weisse unter Kannibalen (1921).
- Frauen, Masken und Dämonen (1932).
- Das letzte Paradies (1932) – The last paradise.
- Die Wildnis stirbt (1936) – The wilderness dies.
- Hans Schomburgk – Mein Abschied von Afrika (1958).
