= The King of the Circus Ring =

1921 film

- Directed by: Joseph Delmont
- Written by: Joseph Delmont; Rudolf Strauß
- Produced by: Luciano Albertini
- Starring: Luciano Albertini
- Cinematography: Edoardo Lamberti; Giovanni Vitrotti
- Production company: Albertini-Film
- Release date: 2 September 1921
- Country: Germany
- Languages: Silent; German intertitles

The King of the Circus Ring (German:Der König der Manege) is a 1921 German silent film directed by Joseph Delmont and starring Luciano Albertini, Angelo Rossi and Alfred Haase.

The film's art direction was by Willi Herrmann.

== Cast ==
- Luciano Albertini as Luciano Sansone
- Angelo Rossi
- Alfred Haase
- Joseph Delmont
- Ellen Ulrich
- Linda Albertini
- Umberto Guarracino
- Frau Schlieben

== Bibliography ==
- John Holmstrom. The moving picture boy: an international encyclopaedia from 1895 to 1995. Michael Russell, 1996.
