= Julot the Apache =

1921 film

- Directed by: Joseph Delmont; Hertha von Walther
- Written by: Joseph Delmont; Walter Lierke
- Produced by: Luciano Albertini
- Starring: Luciano Albertini; Alfred Haase; Linda Albertini
- Cinematography: Edoardo Lamberti; Giovanni Vitrotti
- Production company: Albertini-Film
- Release date: 11 November 1921
- Country: Germany
- Languages: Silent; German intertitles

Julot the Apache (German: Julot der Apache) is a 1921 German silent film directed by Joseph Delmont and Hertha von Walther and starring Luciano Albertini, Alfred Haase and Linda Albertini.

The film's sets were designed by the art director Willi Herrmann.

== Cast ==
- Luciano Albertini as Julot
- Alfred Haase as Vivomte de Troyes
- Linda Albertini
- Paul Moleska
- Hermine Straßmann-Witt
- Ellen Ulrich as Daisy
- Wilhelm Diegelmann as Pinkus Vandergold
- Margarete Kupfer as Kokalaura
- Hertha von Walther as Zofe
- Fräulein Kühn as Nela Pogri, der große Filmstar

== Bibliography ==
- Noah William Isenberg. Weimar Cinema: An Essential Guide to Classic Films of the Era. Columbia University Press, 2009.
