= Rinaldo Rinaldini =

Rinaldo Rinaldini may refer to:

- Rinaldo Rinaldini, a successful and fearsome bandit leader in the Kingdom of Naples in the 18th century
- The History of Rinaldo Rinaldini, a 1798 robber novel by the German writer Christian August Vulpius
- Rinaldo Rinaldini (film), 1927 German silent adventure film based on the novel
