= Giovanni Vitrotti =

Italian cinematographer and director (1882–1966)

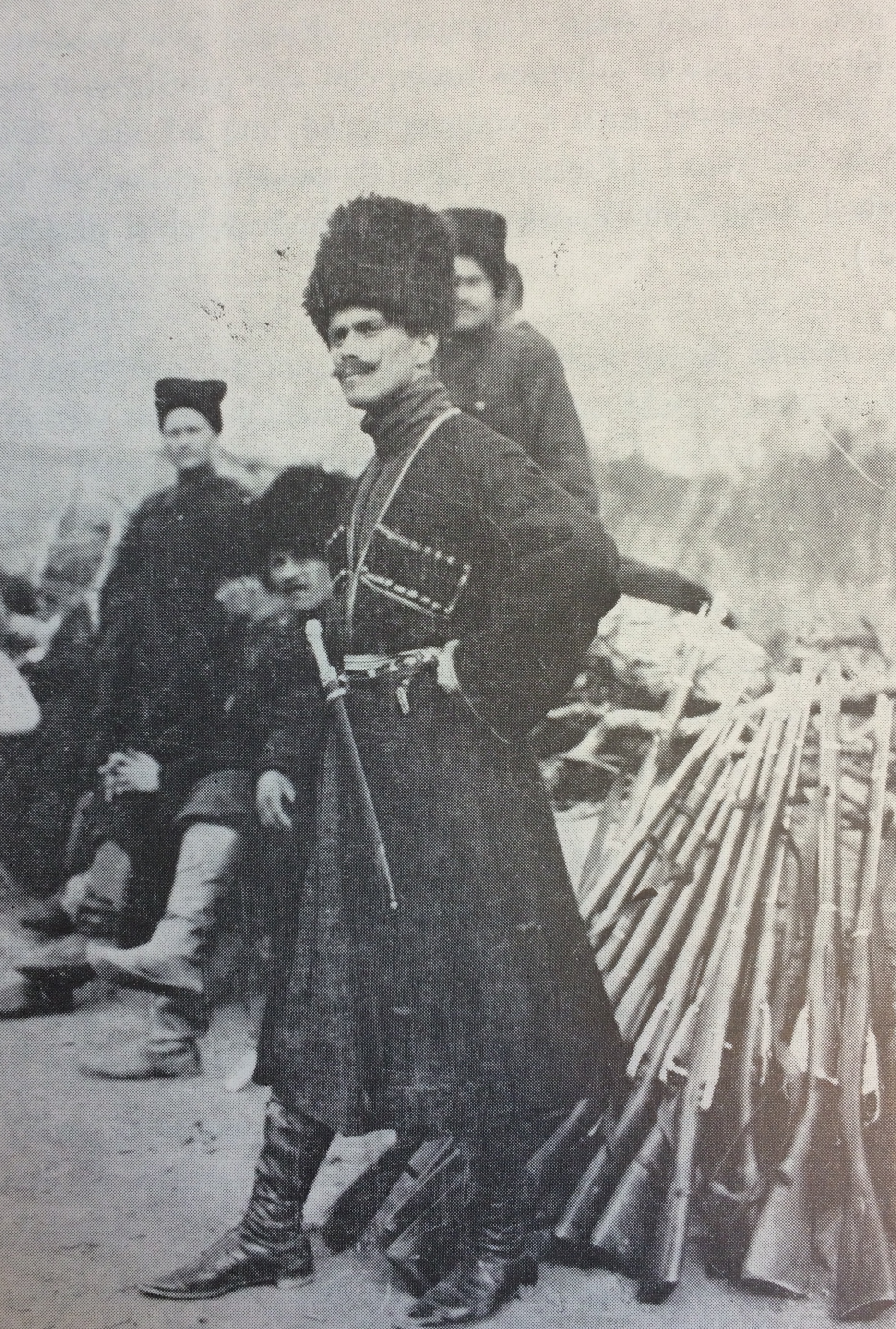
- Giovanni Vitrotti in Caucasus
- Born: 16 November 1882; Turin, Italy
- Died: 1 December 1966 (aged 84); Rome, Lazio, Italy
- Occupations: Cinematographer; Film director
- Years active: 1905 - 1964

Giovanni Vitrotti ( 16 November 1882 – 1 December 1966) was an Italian cinematographer and film director who worked prolifically in Italian films from the silent era onwards. He made films in a number of other countries like Germany, Russia and Poland.

== Biography ==
=== Early life and career ===
Giovanni Vitrotti was born in Turin on 16 November 1882, the second child of Giuseppe and Virginia Lisa Vitrotti. A painter by training, he purchased his first camera at the age of twenty-one and applied what he had learnt during his artistic education to this new medium. He opened a photographic studio in Turin and worked as an art photographer.

In 1903, he began working with Arturo Ambrosio, the founder of one of the oldest Italian film studios: Ambrosio Film. He worked as a photographer and cameraman on many of Ambrosio's productions, including The Last Days of Pompeii (1908), Il diavolo zoppo (1909), Didone abbandonata (1910), La Gioconda (1912), Il fornaretto di Venezia (1914), Teodora (1921), and numerous comedies starring Marcel Perez, Ernesto Vaser, and Gigetta Morano.

In July 1907, Vitrotti married Angela Ercole, with whom he had four children. The following year, he travelled to Sicily to film the ruins caused by the Messina earthquake of 1908. In 1910, he won the Gold Medal for Best Documentary Film at the Brussels International Exposition. That same year, he took his camera to the summit of Mont Blanc, and his footage was subsequently used in at least three documentaries: Da Courmayeur al Dente del Gigante, Escursione nella catena del Monte Bianco and Sulle dentate scintillanti vette.

In the early 1910s, Ambrosio Film sent him to Moscow to work on a co-production contract with the Russian company Thieman & Reinhardt. There, he photographed feature films inspired by classics of Russian literature and theatre. He sometimes acted as artistic director, as in the short dramatic film Kaukazskij plennik (The Prisoner of the Caucasus, 1911), but more often worked alongside local directors such as Yakov Protazanov (The Convict's Song, 1911) and Vladimir Krikov (Kazirskaja starina, 1911). He also explored the steppe, travelling across the Caucasus and other regions with his camera. In 1912, Ambrosio called him back to Italy to work on a series of film adaptations of works by Gabriele D'Annunzio, including La fiaccola sotto il moggio (1911) and La Gioconda (1911), both of which were directed by Luigi Maggi, as well as Sogno di un tramonto d'autunno (1911), which was directed by Ambrosio and Maggi, and La Figlia di Iorio (1911), directed by Eduardo Benci.

=== World War I and Germany ===
In 1913, Vitrotti and Maggi left Ambrosio Film to establish Leonardo Film, a short-lived film production company. Nevertheless, Vitrotti's reputation earned him contracts throughout Italy. During the golden years of Neapolitan film production, producer Gustavo Lombardo hired Vitrotti to work on Giulio Antamoro's L'avvenire in agguato (1916), based on a play by Roberto Bracco. Following his time in Naples, he served as a cameraman for the Royal Italian Army during World War I. After the war, he returned to Ambrosio Film, but the golden age of Italian silent cinema was drawing to a close. Vitrotti was one of the first Italian filmmakers to emigrate to Germany, where the film industry was booming.

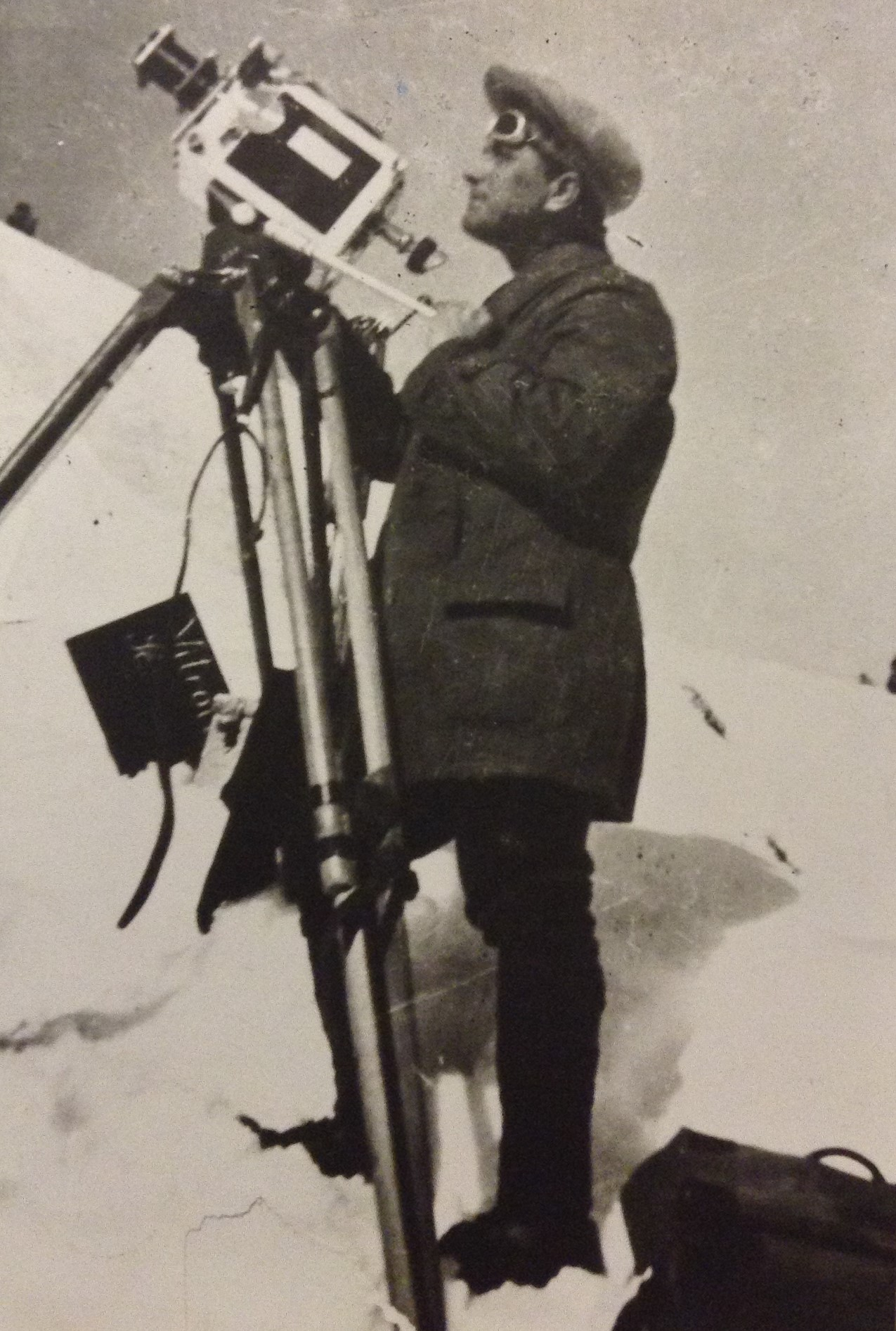
Giovanni Vitrotti in 1926

During the early years of his career in Berlin, he worked on films starring Luciano and Linda Albertini, who had founded an Italian-German production company. He worked on Maciste Teutonico (1921), Maciste and the Silver King's Daughter (1922) and Maciste and Prisoner 51 (1922), all directed by Romano Luigi Borgnetto. In 1924 he worked alongside Curt Courant and Alfredo Donelli on Quo Vadis?, produced by Ambrosio Film and directed by Gabriellino D'Annunzio and Georg Jacoby. (1924).

Vitrotti became a key figure for Italian filmmakers seeking to escape the crisis in Italian domestic industry. Mario Bonnard, Nunzio Malasomma, Enrico Guazzoni and Domenico Gambino all hired him as their cinematographer in Germany. Following Gambino, he travelled to Poland to film A Storm Over Zakopane (1930) in the Tatra Mountains. In the same period he worked on several local productions, including Moralność Pani Dulskiej (The Morality of Mrs Dulska, 1930), the first sound film in Polish cinema history, directed by Bolesław Newolin and starring the Russian singer Dela Lipinska.

=== Back in Italy ===
Vitrotti returned in Italy in 1932 and signed with the film production company Caesar Film. He updated his lighting methods to meet the industry's changing demands. However, due to his age and cultural background, he remained close to filmmakers who had grown up during the silent era, such as Enrico Guazzoni and Gustavo Serena. This distanced him from the new generation of directors, whose sensibilities were more in line with the public's new tastes.

The advent of sound cinema did not prevent Vitrotti from continuing his career, but it deprived him of the leading role he had enjoyed in silent films in Italy and abroad. He worked on films directed by Amleto Palermi and starring Emma Gramatica, including The Old Lady (1932) and La fortuna di Zanze (1933). In 1938, Vitrotti founded Foto Cine Elettra, a company specialising in phonograph recordings. However, he continued working on feature films, such as Flavio Calzavara's 1950 drama Against the Law. He also participated – albeit uncredited – in the production of Julien Duvivier's Don Camillo (1952).

However, it was in the world of documentaries Vitrotti experienced a second youth after the fall of fascism, working alongside young postwar filmmakers such as Luciano Emmer and Michele Gandin. Vitrotti worked for the production company Stella d'Oro Film, founded by the former silent film diva Elena Sangro and specialised in documentaries. During this period, he experimented with new Ferraniacolor negatives in a series of documentaries, including Artefici del mosaico (1955) and Il mare e i monti del Friuli (1957), both of which were directed by his son, Gianni Alberto. His final work, Le isole Borromee (The Borromean Islands), dates back to 1964. Vitrotti died in Turin on 1 December 1966.

== Selected filmography ==
Cinematographer

- The Last Days of Pompeii (1908)
- The Homecoming of Odysseus (1922)
- The Ravine of Death (1923)
- The Maharaja's Victory (1923)
- Quo Vadis? (1924)
- The Man on the Comet (1925)
- Frisian Blood (1925)
- Ship in Distress (1925)
- Hunted People (1926)
- Lives in Danger (1926)
- The Priest from Kirchfeld (1926)
- The Woman from the Folies Bergères (1927)
- Behind the Altar (1927)
- Forbidden Love (1927)
- The Merry Farmer (1927)
- The Last Performance of the Circus Wolfson (1928)
- Vienna, City of My Dreams (1928)
- Villa Falconieri (1928)
- Folly of Love (1928)
- A Girl with Temperament (1928)
- The Sinner (1928)
- Leontine's Husbands (1928)
- The Third Confession (1929)
- I Lost My Heart on a Bus (1929)
- Two People (1930)
- Mountains on Fire (1931)
- When the Soldiers (1931)
- A Storm Over Zakopane (1931)
- The Old Lady (1932)
- Zaganella and the Cavalier (1932)
- The Gift of the Morning (1932)
- Three Lucky Fools (1933)
- Villafranca (1934)
- The Four Musketeers (1936)
- The Countess of Parma (1936)
- Forbidden Music (1942)
- The Son of the Red Corsair (1943)
- Dagli Appennini alle Ande (1943)
- Buffalo Bill in Rome (1949)
- Against the Law (1950)

== Bibliography ==
- Bertellini, Giorgio (2010). Italy in Early American Cinema: Race, Landscape, and the Picturesque. Bloomington & Indianapolis: Indiana University Press. ISBN 978-0253221285.
- Masi, Stefano (2020). "VITROTTI, Giovanni Battista". Dizionario Biografico degli Italiani (in Italian). Vol. 99: Verrazzano–Vittorio Amedeo. Rome: Istituto dell'Enciclopedia Italiana. ISBN 978-88-12-00032-6.
