= The Pearl of Cleopatra =

1922 film

- Directed by: Guido Brignone
- Starring: Carlo Aldini
- Production company: Rodolfifilm
- Distributed by: Rodolfifilm
- Release date: September 1922
- Country: Italy
- Languages: Silent; Italian intertitles

The Pearl of Cleopatra (Italian: Le perle di Cleopatra) is a 1922 Italian silent film directed by Guido Brignone and starring Carlo Aldini.

== Cast ==
- Carlo Aldini
- Liliana Ardea
- Giuseppe Brignone
- Vasco Creti
- Cesare Gani Carini
- Fernanda Negri Pouget
- Armand Pouget
- Lola Visconti-Brignone

== Bibliography ==
- James Robert Parish & Kingsley Canham. Film Directors Guide: Western Europe. Scarecrow Press, 1976.
