= Thamar, The Child of the Mountains =

1924 film

- Directed by: Robert Dinesen
- Written by: Curt J. Braun; Rolf E. Vanloo
- Starring: Lya De Putti; Paul Otto; Anton Pointner
- Cinematography: Sophus Wangøe
- Music by: Willy Schmidt-Gentner
- Production company: Phoebus Film
- Distributed by: Phoebus Film
- Release date: 7 April 1924
- Country: Germany
- Languages: Silent; German intertitles

Thamar, The Child of the Mountains (German:Thamar, das Kind der Berge) is a 1924 German silent film directed by Robert Dinesen and starring Lya De Putti, Paul Otto and Anton Pointner.

The film's sets were designed by the art director Willi Herrmann.

== Cast ==
- Lya De Putti as Thamar - Graf Daniloffs Schwester
- Paul Otto as Graf Daniloff
- Anton Pointner as Frank Bondy - Ingenieur
- Alfred Haase as Graf Menschikeff
- Harry Hardt as Taegar - Ingenieur
- Sylvia Torf as Minka
- Alfred Kern as Diener
- Max Maximilian

== Bibliography ==
- Bock, Hans-Michael & Bergfelder, Tim. The Concise CineGraph. Encyclopedia of German Cinema. Berghahn Books, 2009.
