= Almenrausch and Edelweiss =

Almenrausch and Edelweiss may refer to:

- Almenrausch and Edelweiss (1957 film), an Austrian-West German comedy film
- Almenrausch and Edelweiss (1928 film), a German silent drama film
