= Hunted People =

1926 film directed by Nunzio Malasomma

- Theatrical release poster
- Directed by: Nunzio Malasomma
- Written by: Curt J. Braun
- Produced by: Carlo Aldini
- Starring: Carlo Aldini; Maly Delschaft; Erich Kaiser-Titz
- Cinematography: Edoardo Lamberti; Giovanni Vitrotti
- Production company: Filmproduktion Carlo Aldini
- Distributed by: Deitz & Co.
- Release date: 27 August 1926
- Country: Germany
- Languages: Silent; German intertitles

Hunted People (German: Jagd auf Menschen) is a 1926 German silent adventure film directed by Nunzio Malasomma and starring Carlo Aldini, Maly Delschaft, and Erich Kaiser-Titz.

The film's sets were designed by the art director Max Heilbronner.

== Cast ==
- Carlo Aldini as Frank Holmar
- Maly Delschaft as Elijy
- Erich Kaiser-Titz as Millionär Stevens
- Margarete Kupfer as Köchin
- Inge Falken as Kind
- Albert Paulig as Leiter des Detektiv-Instituts
- Vivian Gibson as Lili
- Ellen Plessow as Nurse
- Hans Albers as Gordon
- Rolf Brunner as Jonny
- Karl Falkenberg as Haller

== Bibliography ==
- Grange, William (2008). Cultural Chronicle of the Weimar Republic. Lanham, MD: Scarecrow Press. ISBN 978-0-8108-5967-8.
