= Mister Radio =

1924 film directed by Nunzio Malasomma

- Directed by: Nunzio Malasomma
- Written by: Ernest Bouthley
- Starring: Luciano Albertini; Evi Eva; Magnus Stifter; Fred Immler
- Cinematography: Willy Großstück; Edoardo Lamberti
- Production company: Phoebus-Film
- Distributed by: Phoebus-Film
- Release date: 5 September 1924
- Country: Germany
- Languages: Silent; German intertitles

Mister Radio is a 1924 German silent drama film directed by Nunzio Malasomma and starring Luciano Albertini, Evi Eva and Magnus Stifter.

== Cast ==
- Luciano Albertini as Gaston de Montfort
- Evi Eva as Marion
- Magnus Stifter as Joe Swalzen
- Fred Immler as Girondin
- Agnes Nero as Gräfin Jeanne de Montgort
- Anna Gorilowa as Edy Duflos
- Robert Scholz as Industrieller
- Angelo Rossi as Bergführer
- Mario Fossati as Journalist
- M. Leonhard as Apache

== Bibliography ==
- Grange, William. Cultural Chronicle of the Weimar Republic. Scarecrow Press, 2008.
