= The Homecoming of Odysseus (1922 film) =

1922 film directed by Max Obal

- Directed by: Max Obal
- Written by: Rolf E. Vanloo
- Starring: Luciano Albertini; Cläre Lotto; Heinrich Schroth
- Cinematography: Willy Großstück; Giovanni Vitrotti
- Production company: Phoebus-Film
- Distributed by: Phoebus-Film
- Release date: 18 October 1922
- Country: Germany
- Languages: Silent; German intertitles

The Homecoming of Odysseus (German: Die Heimkehr des Odysseus) is a 1922 German silent historical film directed by Max Obal and starring Luciano Albertini, Cläre Lotto, and Heinrich Schroth.

The film's sets were designed by the art director Hans Sohnle.

== Cast ==
- Luciano Albertini
- Cläre Lotto
- Heinrich Schroth
- Hermann Böttcher
- Ernst Behmer
- Fritz Hirsch

== Bibliography ==
- Michelakis, Pantelis; Wyke, Maria, eds. (2013). The Ancient World in Silent Cinema. Cambridge: Cambridge University Press. ISBN 978-1-107-01610-1.
