= Rolf E. Vanloo =

German playwright and screenwriter (1899–1946)

- Born: 24 March 1899; Minden, German Empire
- Died: 2 April 1946 (aged 47); Munich, West Germany
- Occupation: Writer
- Years active: 1921-1941 (film)

Rolf E. Vanloo (1899-1946) was a German playwright and screenwriter. He also produced the 1937 film Tango Notturno.

== Selected filmography ==
- The Secret of Bombay (1921)
- Four Around a Woman (1921)
- The Man of Steel (1922)
- The Fire Ship (1922)
- The Homecoming of Odysseus (1922)
- The Passenger in the Straitjacket (1922)
- Maciste and the Silver King's Daughter (1922)
- Power of Temptation (1922)
- The Maharaja's Victory (1923)
- Quarantine (1923)
- Malva (1924)
- Thamar, The Child of the Mountains (1924)
- The Farmer from Texas (1925)
- I Love You (1925)
- The Spinning Ball (1927)
- The Runaway Girl (1928)
- I Kiss Your Hand, Madame (1929)
- Asphalt (1929)
- Diane (1929)
- The Informer (1929)
- Here's Berlin (1932)
- Gold (1934)
- Variety (1935)
- Dangerous Crossing (1937)
- Widow's Island (1937)
- Tango Notturno (1937)
- The Night of Decision (1938)
- Mask in Blue (1943)

== Bibliography ==
- Hardt, Ursula. From Caligari to California: Erich Pommer's Life in the International Film Wars. Berghahn Books, 1996.
