= Ellen Plessow =

German actress (1891–1967)

Ellen Plessow (born as Helene Wiemuth Penning on 12 January 1891, in Oldenburg – 2 September 1967, in West Berlin) was a German actress.

Plessow attended the conservatory in Hanover and played in Berlin theatres. Starting in the 1920s she played often amusing roles in silent films.

== Filmography ==
- The Girl from the Rhine (1922)
- His Excellency from Madagascar (1922)
- The Girl with the Mask (1922)
- Debit and Credit (1924)
- Set Me Free (1924)
- A Free People (1925)
- The Farmer from Texas (1925)
- Love and Trumpets (1925)
- The King and the Girl (1925)
- The Morals of the Alley (1925)
- The Telephone Operator (1925)
- Annemarie and Her Cavalryman (1926)
- Marriage Announcement (1926)
- Hunted People (1926)
- The Fiddler of Florence (1926)
- Kissing Is No Sin (1926)
- The Captain from Koepenick (1926)
- Radio Magic (1927)
- Heaven on Earth (1927)
- Volga Volga (1928)
- The Duty to Remain Silent (1928)
- He Goes Right, She Goes Left! (1928)
- Fräulein Else (1929)
- Im Kampf mit der Unterwelt (1930)
- Dolly Gets Ahead (1930)
- The Cabinet of Doctor Larifari (1930)
- By a Nose (1931)
- Here's Berlin (1932)
- Nanon (1938)
- You and I (1938)
- Salonwagen E 417 (1939)
- Das Mädchen Christine (1949)
- Corinna Schmidt (1951)
- Die Prinzessin und der Schweinehirt (1953)
- Kein Hüsung (1954)
- Pole Poppenspäler (1954)
- Das tapfere Schneiderlein (1956)
- Emilia Galotti (1957)
- Bärenburger Schnurre (1957)
