= Under Suspicion (1928 film) =

1928 film by Constantin J. David

- Directed by: Constantin J. David
- Written by: Victor Abel; Alfred Zeisler
- Produced by: Alfred Zeisler
- Starring: Hanni Weisse; Gritta Ley; Kurt Gerron
- Cinematography: Friedl Behn-Grund
- Production company: UFA
- Distributed by: UFA
- Release date: 3 August 1928
- Country: Germany
- Languages: Silent; German intertitles

Under Suspicion (German title: Vom Täter fehlt jede Spur) is a 1928 German silent crime film directed by Constantin J. David and starring Hanni Weisse, Gritta Ley and Kurt Gerron. After the owner of an amusement park if found murdered, police investigate the principal suspects.

The film's art direction was by Jacek Rotmil.

== Cast ==
- Hanni Weisse as Frieda
- Gritta Ley as Edith
- Kurt Gerron as Maxe
- Fritz Kampers as John
- Paul Rehkopf as Ogalsky, Ediths Onkel
- Ernst Stahl-Nachbaur as Kriminalkommissar Dr. Bernburg
- Ferdinand Hart as Emil
- Franz Cornelius as Hehler Rasurek
- Rolf von Goth as Harry Hofer
- Klaus Pohl as Otto
- Michael von Newlinsky as Kriminalkommissar Anschütz

== Bibliography ==
- Kristin Thompson. Herr Lubitsch Goes to Hollywood: German and American Film After World War I. Amsterdam University Press, 2005.
