= Gritta Ley =

German actress

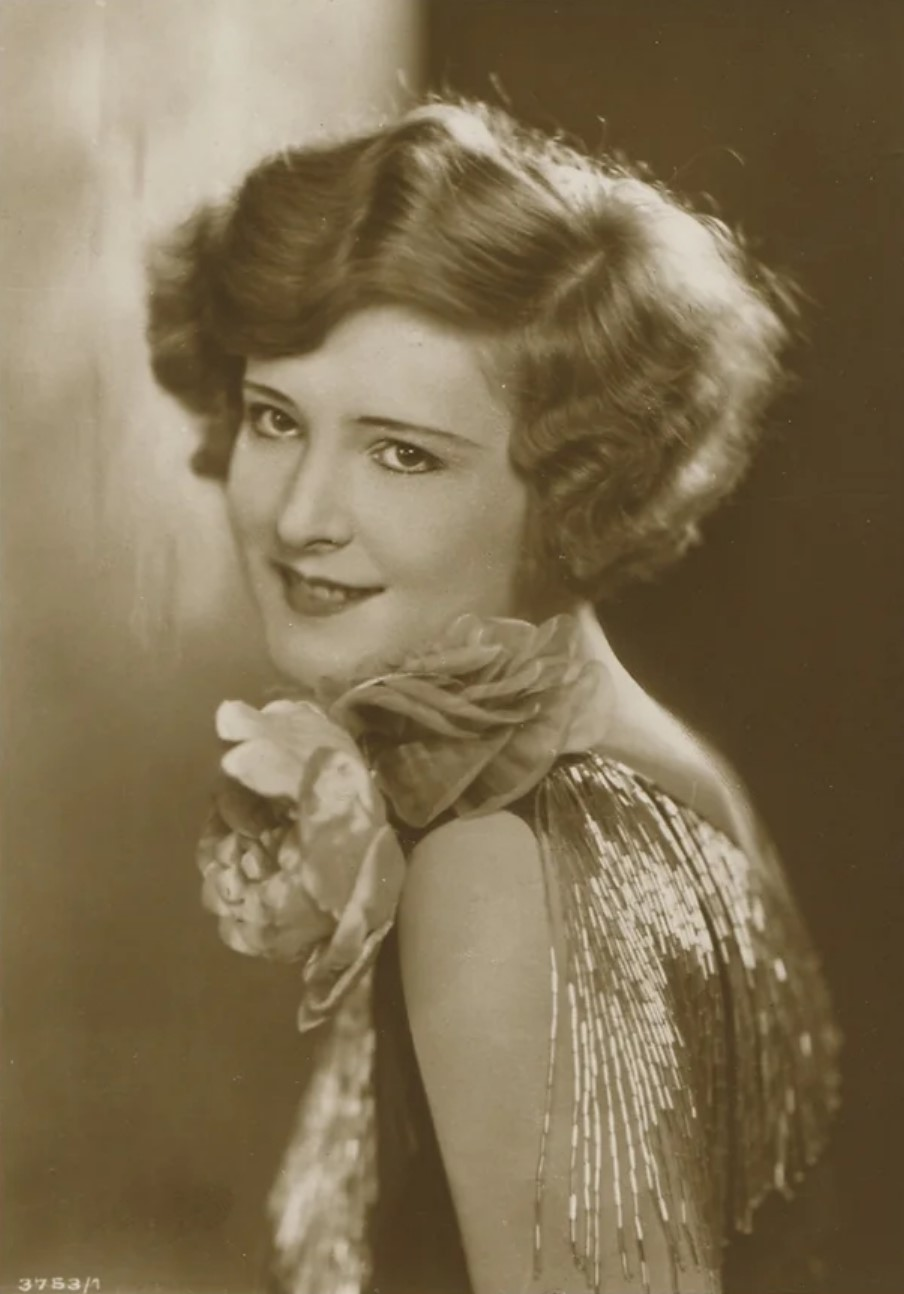
- Gritta Ley photographed by Suse Byk, 1920s
- Born: 16 November 1903; Berlin, German Empire
- Occupation: Actress
- Years active: 1927–1930 (film)

Gritta Ley was a German film actress of the silent era.

== Selected filmography ==
- The Marriage Nest (1927)
- Girls, Beware! (1928)
- The Criminal of the Century (1928)
- Autumn on the Rhine (1928)
- The Lady from Argentina (1928)
- Almenrausch and Edelweiss (1928)
- Under Suspicion (1928)
- The Midnight Waltz (1929)
- The Daredevil Reporter (1929)
- The Lord of the Tax Office (1929)

== Bibliography ==
- Goble, Alan. The Complete Index to Literary Sources in Film. Walter de Gruyter, 1999.
