= Vivian Gibson =

British actress (1893–1956)

- Born: Georgina Mabel Gibson; 14 May 1893; Liverpool, United Kingdom
- Died: May 9, 1981 (aged 87); Vienna, Austria
- Occupation: Actress
- Years active: 1916–1932

Vivian Gibson (14 May 1893 – 9 May 1981) was a British-born actress. Born Georgina Mabel Gibson she took the stage name Vivian Gibson. Her silent movie career was in Germany during the interwar period. She returned to the UK in 1932 after which she worked on the stage.

== Selected filmography ==
- Demos (1921)
- The Glorious Adventure (1922)
- Fräulein Raffke (1923)
- Countess Maritza (1925)
- The King and the Girl (1925)
- The Man Who Sold Himself (1925)
- Niniche (1925)
- The Little Variety Star (1926)
- Why Get a Divorce? (1926)
- Hunted People (1926)
- Nanette Makes Everything (1926)
- Hell of Love (1926)
- My Heidelberg, I Can Not Forget You (1927)
- Regine (1927)
- Excluded from the Public (1927)
- The Gypsy Baron (1927)
- The Bordello in Rio (1927)
- The Man with the Counterfeit Money (1927)
- Light Cavalry (1927)
- The Orlov (1927)
- The Prince's Child (1927)
- Flirtation (1927)
- The Beloved of His Highness (1928)
- The Runaway Girl (1928)
- The White Sonata (1928)
- The Insurmountable (1928)
- The Criminal of the Century (1928)
- Marriage (1928)
- Champagne (1928)
- Angst (1928)
- The Woman on the Rack (1928)
- The Duty to Remain Silent (1928)
- Beware of Loose Women (1929)
- The Woman of Yesterday and Tomorrow (1928)
- Rustle of Spring (1929)
- Bright Eyes (1929)
- The Mad Bomberg (1932)

== Bibliography ==
- Jung, Uli; Schatzberg, Walter (1999). Beyond Caligari: The Films of Robert Wiene. New York: Berghahn Books. ISBN 978-1-57181-156-1.
- Bergfelder, Tim; Harris, Sue; Street, Sarah (2007). Film Architecture and the Transnational Imagination: Set Design in 1930s European Cinema. Amsterdam: Amsterdam University Press. ISBN 978-90-5356-984-9.
