= The Maharaja's Victory =

1923 film directed by Joseph Delmont

- Directed by: Joseph Delmont
- Written by: Rolf E. Vanloo
- Starring: Luciano Albertini; Erich Kaiser-Titz; Wilhelm Diegelmann
- Cinematography: Giovanni Vitrotti
- Production company: Phoebus Film
- Distributed by: Phoebus Film
- Release date: 22 October 1923
- Country: Germany
- Languages: Silent; German intertitles

The Maharaja's Victory (German: Der Sieg des Maharadscha) is a 1923 German silent film directed by Joseph Delmont and starring Luciano Albertini, Erich Kaiser-Titz and Wilhelm Diegelmann.

The film's sets were designed by the art director Willi Herrmann.

== Cast ==
- Luciano Albertini
- Erich Kaiser-Titz
- Wilhelm Diegelmann
- Lili Dominici
- Rolf Müller

== Bibliography ==
- Alfred Krautz. International directory of cinematographers, set- and costume designers in film, Volume 4. Saur, 1984.
