= Miss Madame (1934 film) =

1934 film directed by Carl Boese

- Directed by: Carl Boese
- Written by: Axel Eggebrecht
- Based on: Miss Madame by Ludwig Fulda
- Produced by: Felix Pfitzner; Ilja Salkind
- Starring: Jenny Jugo; Paul Hörbiger; Olga Limburg
- Cinematography: Willy Winterstein
- Edited by: Hilde Grebner
- Music by: Franz Grothe
- Production company: T.K. Tonfilm-Produktion
- Release date: 23 February 1934
- Country: Germany
- Language: German

Miss Madame (German: Fräulein Frau) is a 1934 German comedy film directed by Carl Boese and starring Jenny Jugo, Paul Hörbiger, and Olga Limburg. The film's sets were designed by the art director Erich Czerwonski. It was based on play of the same title by Ludwig Fulda.

== Cast ==
- Jenny Jugo as Erika Berghausen, Stenotypistin
- Paul Hörbiger as Peter Valentin, Prokurist
- Olga Limburg as Erikas Mutter
- Anton Pointner as Belmonte, Filmschauspieler
- Fritz Odemar as Alfred, Oberkellner
- Hans Hermann Schaufuß as Herr mit Kneifer
- Karl Elzer as Mann mit Bart
- Alfred Haase as Empfangschef
- Kurt Getke as Glatzköpfiger
- Bert Schmidt-Moris as Boy
- Hilde Maris as Zofe
- Hans Albin

== Bibliography ==
- Bock, Hans-Michael; Bergfelder, Tim, eds. (2009). The Concise Cinegraph: Encyclopaedia of German Cinema. New York: Berghahn Books. ISBN 978-1-57181-655-9.
- Goble, Alan. The Complete Index to Literary Sources in Film. Walter de Gruyter, 1999.
