= The King and the Girl =

1925 film directed by Nunzio Malasomma

- Directed by: Nunzio Malasomma
- Written by: Nunzio Malasomma
- Starring: Luciano Albertini; Evi Eva; Ellen Plessow
- Cinematography: Willy Großstück
- Production company: Phoebus Film
- Distributed by: Phoebus Film
- Release date: 19 June 1925
- Country: Germany
- Languages: Silent; German intertitles

The King and the Girl (German: Der König und das kleine Mädchen) is a 1925 German silent film directed by Nunzio Malasomma and starring Luciano Albertini, Evi Eva, and Ellen Plessow.

The film's art direction is by Willi Herrmann.

== Cast ==
- Luciano Albertini as Der Prinz Rudolf von Seeland
- Evi Eva as Das Mädchen aus dem Dollarland
- Ellen Plessow
- Willy Kaiser-Heyl as Der König von Neuseeland
- Martin Hartwig as Der Herzog Ilario
- Hermann Picha as Foulard, der Erzieher des Prinzen
- Hans Albers as Brechard
- Vivian Gibson
- Lisa Romano as Dolly
- Maria Forescu as Die Schenkwirtin
- Willi Allen as Der Niggerboy
- Anna Gorilowa as Die Apachin
- Giuseppe Spalla as Der Boxer

== Bibliography ==
- Parish, James Robert (1977). Film Actors Guide: Western Europe. Metuchen, NJ: Scarecrow Press. ISBN 978-0-8108-1044-0.
