= The Third Watch =

1924 film

- Directed by: Karl Gerhardt
- Written by: Arthur Rosen; Paul Rosenhayn; Franz Schulz
- Produced by: Willy Zeunert
- Starring: Carlo Aldini; Claire Rommer; Kurt Brenkendorf
- Cinematography: Carl Drews; Akos Farkas
- Production company: Phoebus Film
- Distributed by: Phoebus Film
- Release date: 3 December 1924
- Running time: 81 minutes
- Country: Germany
- Languages: Silent; German intertitles

The Third Watch (German: Dreiklang der Nacht) is a 1924 German silent drama film directed by Karl Gerhardt and starring Carlo Aldini, Claire Rommer, and Kurt Brenkendorf. Its art director was Willi Herrmann.

== Cast ==
- Carlo Aldini as Alf Julsrud
- Claire Rommer as Janna Gyttorp
- Kurt Brenkendorf as Niels Gyttorp, Bankier
- Max Bing as Dr. Swante
- Rudolf Klein-Rhoden as Efim Alepp
- Ruth Beyer as Bella, seine Tochter
- Fred Immler as Negul
- Hans Sternberg as Johnston
- Hans Kuhnert as Fürst Miljukin
- Maria Grünke as Julsruds alte Wirtin
- Ludwig Rex as Gyttorps Sekretär

== Bibliography ==
- Grange, William (2008). Cultural Chronicle of the Weimar Republic. Lanham, MD: Scarecrow Press. ISBN 978-0-8108-5967-8.
