= All Is at Stake =

1932 film

All is at Stake
- Directed by: Max Nosseck
- Written by: Max Kolpé
- Starring: Luciano Albertini; Claire Rommer; Ernő Verebes; Carl Auen
- Cinematography: Walter Robert Lach
- Music by: Hans May
- Production company: Deutsche Lichtspiel-Syndikat
- Distributed by: Deutsche Lichtspiel-Syndikat
- Release date: 7 June 1932
- Running time: 76 minutes
- Country: Germany
- Language: German

All is at Stake (German: Es geht um alles) is a 1932 German comedy thriller film directed by Max Nosseck and starring Luciano Albertini, Claire Rommer and Ernő Verebes. It was shot at the Staaken Studios in Berlin and on location in the city's Wintergarten and in Hamburg.

== Cast ==
- Luciano Albertini
- Claire Rommer
- Ernő Verebes as Ernst Verebes
- Carl Auen
- Domenico Gambino
- Eddie Polo
- Willi Schur
- Walter Steinbeck
- Norbert Miller
- Gustav Püttjer

== Bibliography ==
- Klaus, Ulrich J. Deutsche Tonfilme: Jahrgang 1932. Klaus-Archiv, 1988.
- Prawer, Siegbert Salomon (2005). Between Two Worlds: The Jewish Presence in German and Austrian Film, 1910–1933. Berghahn Books. ISBN 978-1-84545-074-8.
