= Max Obal =

German actor, screenwriter, and film director (1881–1949)

- Born: Max David Gotthelf Sroke; 4 September 1881; Brieg, Silesia; German Empire
- Died: 18 May 1949 (aged 67); Wilmersdorf, Berlin, Germany
- Occupations: Director, screenwriter, actor. singer
- Years active: 1911–1938 (film)

Max Obal (born Max David Gotthelf Sroke; 4 September 1881 – 18 May 1949) was a German actor, singer, screenwriter, and film director. He co-directed the 1927 swashbuckler Rinaldo Rinaldini featuring Hans Albers.

== Selected filmography ==
- The Traitress (1911)
- Camera Obscura (1921)
- The Homecoming of Odysseus (1922)
- The Ravine of Death (1923)
- The Shot in the Pavilion (1925)
- The Woman from the Folies Bergères (1927)
- Rinaldo Rinaldini (co-director: Rudolf Dworsky, 1927)
- A Modern Casanova (1928)
- The Insurmountable (1928)
- The Criminal of the Century (1928)
- Tempo! Tempo! (1929)
- Queen of Fashion (1929)
- Peace of Mind (1931)
- Adventures in the Engadin (1932)
- Two Good Comrades (1933)
- Annette in Paradise (1934)
- The Monastery's Hunter (1935)
- The Haunted Castle (1936)

== Bibliography ==
- Grange, William. Cultural Chronicle of the Weimar Republic. Scarecrow Press, 2008.
