= Henry Lorenzen =

Danish actor (1899–1961)

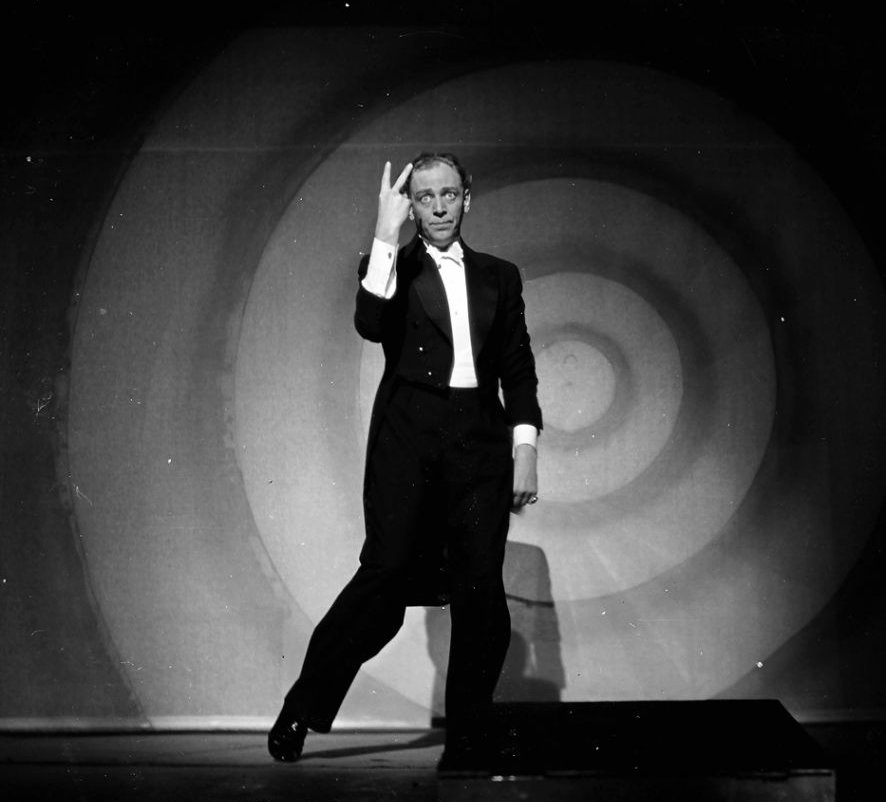
- Lorenzen in 1937
- Born: 8 February 1899; Denmark
- Died: 22 September 1961 (aged 62); West Berlin, West Germany
- Occupation: Actor
- Years active: 1930 - 1961 (film)

Henry Lorenzen (8 February 1899 – 22 September 1961) was a Danish film actor.

== Selected filmography ==
- Girls of Today (1933)
- The Champion of Pontresina (1934)
- Roses from the South (1934)
- Tales from the Vienna Woods (1934)
- Punks Arrives from America (1935)
- Streak of Steel (1935)
- Intermezzo (1936)
- The Grey Lady (1937)
- His Best Friend (1937)
- Nanette (1940)
- Five Suspects (1950)
- The Reluctant Maharaja (1950)
- Dutch Girl (1953)
- The Missing Miniature (1954)
- Your Life Guards (1955)
- Love, Dance and a Thousand Songs (1955)
- The Simple Girl (1957)
- Voyage to Italy, Complete with Love (1958)
- The Angel Who Pawned Her Harp (1959)
- The Green Archer (1961)

== Bibliography ==
- Giesen, Rolf. Nazi Propaganda Films: A History and Filmography. McFarland, 2003.
