= Der Mann aus Stahl =

1922 German silent drama film

- Directed by: Joseph Delmont
- Written by: Rolf E. Vanloo
- Produced by: Luciano Albertini
- Starring: Luciano Albertini; Wilhelm Diegelmann; Carola Toelle
- Cinematography: Axel Graatkjær
- Edited by: Joseph Delmont
- Production company: Albertini-Film
- Release date: 14 April 1922
- Country: Germany
- Language: Silent

Der Mann aus Stahl (transl. The Man of Steel) is a 1922 German silent drama film directed by Joseph Delmont and starring Luciano Albertini, Wilhelm Diegelmann, and Carola Toelle.

== Cast ==
- Luciano Albertini
- Wilhelm Diegelmann
- Carola Toelle
- Hermann Vallentin
- Magnus Stifter
- Fritz Schulz
- Robert Leffler
- Rudolf del Zopp
