= Around a Million =

1924 film directed by Joseph Delmont

- Directed by: Joseph Delmont
- Written by: Joseph Delmont
- Produced by: Arthur Günsburg
- Starring: Harry Hardt; Dary Holm; Wilhelm Diegelmann
- Production company: Arthur Günsburg-Film
- Release date: 22 December 1924
- Country: Germany
- Languages: Silent; German intertitles

Around a Million (German: Um eine Million) is a 1924 German silent film directed by Joseph Delmont and starring Harry Hardt, Dary Holm and Wilhelm Diegelmann.

== Cast ==
- Harry Hardt
- Dary Holm
- Wilhelm Diegelmann
- Betty Ross Clarke
- Madge Stuart
- Lewis Dayton

== Bibliography ==
- Lamprecht, Gerhard (1967). Deutsche Stummfilme. Vol. 8: 1923–1926. Berlin: Deutsche Kinemathek.
