= Kissing Is No Sin =

Kissing Is No Sin can refer to:

- Kissing Is No Sin (1926 film), German silent comedy
- Kissing Is No Sin (1950 film), Austrian-German comedy
