= The Spinning Ball (1927 film) =

1927 film

- German: Die rollende Kugel
- Directed by: Erich Schönfelder
- Written by: Rolf E. Vanloo
- Starring: Edda Croy; Harry Liedtke; Erna Morena
- Cinematography: Mutz Greenbaum; Karl Wellert
- Music by: Pasquale Perris
- Production company: Pan Europa-Film
- Distributed by: Filmhaus Bruckmann
- Release date: 9 September 1927
- Country: Germany
- Languages: Silent; German intertitles

The Spinning Ball (German: Die rollende Kugel) is a 1927 German silent film directed by Erich Schönfelder and starring Edda Croy, Harry Liedtke and Erna Morena. It was shot at the Staaken Studios in Berlin.

== Cast ==
- Edda Croy as Maerid Ragvind
- Harry Liedtke as Robert von Landivis
- Erna Morena as Marquise de St. Dourdan
- Jean Bradin as Pierre Grenville
- Adele Sandrock as Princess Seljawtschina
- Paul Otto as Marquis de St. Dourdan
- Helen von Münchofen as lady
- Alice Kempen as Zofe
- Borwin Walth as secretary
