= Mary's Big Secret =

1928 film

- Directed by: Guido Brignone
- Written by: Viktor Klein; Paul Langenscheidt (novel)
- Cinematography: Akos Farkas; Gustave Preiss
- Music by: Bernard Homola
- Production company: Lothar Stark-Film
- Release date: 23 March 1928
- Country: Germany
- Languages: Silent; German intertitles

Mary's Big Secret (German: Marys großes Geheimnis) is a 1928 German silent film directed by Guido Brignone.

The film's art direction was by Robert A. Dietrich.

== Cast ==
- André Mattoni
- Ralph Arthur Roberts
- Dolly Grey
- Max Maxudian
- Max Maximilian
- Lydia Potechina
- Eva Speyer
- Elza Temary
- Kurt Vespermann

== Bibliography ==
- John Holmstrom. The moving picture boy: an international encyclopaedia from 1895 to 1995. Michael Russell, 1996.
