= The Five Frankfurters =

1922 film

- Directed by: Erich Schönfelder
- Written by: Max Monato; Carl Rössler (play)
- Cinematography: Hans Bloch
- Music by: Heinz Giessen
- Production company: Viktoria-Film
- Distributed by: Viktoria-Film
- Release date: 5 October 1922
- Running time: 96 minutes
- Country: Germany
- Languages: Silent; German intertitles

The Five Frankfurters (German: Die fünf Frankfurter) is a 1922 German silent historical film directed by Erich Schönfelder. It was based on a 1912 play of the same title about the rise of the Rothschild family.

The film's sets were designed by the art directors Rudi Feld and Robert Neppach.

== Cast ==
In alphabetical order
- Else Bäck as Selma
- Karl Beckersachs as Herzog vom Taunus
- Ernst Behmer as Rat Ysel
- Arthur Bergen as Karl Rothschild
- Rita Burg as Charlotte
- Josefine Dora as Rosa
- Karl Etlinger as Banker Nathanson
- Maria Forescu as Frau Nathanson
- Max Grünberg as Heinrich Heine
- Alfred Haase as Graf Fehrenbach
- Ludwig Hartau
- Leonhard Haskel as Maier Amschel Rothschild jun.
- Guido Herzfeld as Salomon Rothschild
- Fritz Hirsch as Maier Amschel Rothschild sen.
- Boris Michailow as Jacob Rothschild
- Sophie Pagay as Mrs. Schnapper
- Albert Patry as Count Stadion
- Albert Paulig
- Ernst Pittschau as Wellington
- Karl Platen as Samuel
- Emil Rameau as Friscard
- Frida Richard as Gudula
- Gerhard Ritterband
- Berthold Rose as Baruch Schnapper
- Karl Rückert as Der Domprobst
- Robert Scholz as Kaiser Franz I.
- Fritz Schulz as Bleichröder
- Hermine Sterler as Gräfin Stadion
- Heinz Stieda as Der Kurfürst von Hessen
- Frau Ulmann as Rahel
- Hermann Vallentin
- Karl Weinschenk as Rossini
- Heinrich Zahdor as Nathan Rothschild
