= Why Get a Divorce? =

1926 film directed by Manfred Noa

- Directed by: Manfred Noa
- Written by: Max Glass
- Starring: André Mattoni; Vivian Gibson; Colette Brettel; Margarete Kupfer
- Cinematography: Gustave Preiss
- Music by: Eduard Prasch
- Production company: Terra Film
- Distributed by: Terra Film
- Release date: 4 March 1926
- Country: Germany
- Languages: Silent; German intertitles

Why Get a Divorce? (German: Warum sich scheiden lassen?) is a 1926 German silent comedy film directed by Manfred Noa and starring André Mattoni, Vivian Gibson, and Colette Brettel. It premiered in Berlin on 4 March 1926. It was shot at the Terra Studios in Berlin. The film's art direction was by Julius von Borsody.

== Cast ==
- André Mattoni
- Vivian Gibson
- Colette Brettel
- Margarete Kupfer
- Max Landa
- Emil Heyse
- Ellen Heel
- Henry Bender
- Hermann Picha

== Bibliography ==
- Grange, William. Cultural Chronicle of the Weimar Republic. Scarecrow Press, 2008.
