= Light Cavalry (1927 film) =

1927 film

- Directed by: Rolf Randolf
- Written by: Emanuel Alfieri
- Starring: Alfons Fryland; André Mattoni; John Mylong
- Cinematography: Werner Bohne; Willy Hameister; Emil Schünemann
- Music by: Willy Schmidt-Gentner
- Production company: Phoebus-Film
- Distributed by: Phoebus-Film
- Release date: 13 October 1927
- Country: Germany
- Languages: Silent; German intertitles

Light Cavalry (German: Leichte Kavallerie) is a 1927 German silent film directed by Rolf Randolf and starring Alfons Fryland, André Mattoni, and John Mylong.

The film's sets were designed by the art director Gustav A. Knauer.

== Cast ==
- Alfons Fryland as Oberleutnant Hihalom
- André Mattoni as Leutnant Graf Starhemberg
- John Mylong as Graf Komaroff
- Vivian Gibson as Gräfin Komaroff
- Albert Steinrück as Rabbi Süß
- Elizza La Porta as Rahel, Süßs Tochter
- Fritz Kampers as Wachtmeister Farkas
- Sig Arno as Moritz Wasserstrahl
- Rudolf Meinhard-Jünger as Mihu, ein Knecht

== Bibliography ==
- Stach, Babett; Morsbach, Helmut (1992). German Film Posters: 1895–1945. Munich: K.G. Saur. ISBN 978-3-598-22593-2.
