= His Best Friend (1937 film) =

1937 film directed by Harry Piel

- Directed by: Harry Piel
- Written by: Hanns Marschall; Harry Piel; Hans Rameau; Georg Zoch
- Produced by: Harry Piel
- Starring: Harry Piel; Edna Greyff; Henry Lorenzen; Lissy Arna
- Cinematography: Günther Anders; Friedl Behn-Grund
- Edited by: Carl Otto Bartning; Paul May
- Music by: Fritz Wenneis
- Production companies: Ariel-Film; Tobis-Rota
- Distributed by: Tobis Film
- Release date: 26 February 1937
- Running time: 99 minutes
- Country: Germany
- Language: German

His Best Friend (German: Sein bester Freund) is a 1937 German crime film directed by and starring Harry Piel. It also features Edna Greyff, Henry Lorenzen and Lissy Arna. It was shot at the Johannisthal Studios in Berlin. The film's sets were designed by the art directors Karl Weber and Erich Zander. Piel had previously starred in a 1929 film of the same title.

== Plot ==
On a rainy night a German Shepherd appears to be wandering aimlessly down the sidewalk when he bumps into detective Harry Peters. Peters takes the seemingly abandoned dog with him and is soon able to identify the owner, a dog dealer, who agrees to sell him the dog. Harry names the dog "Greif" and decides to train him to be a police dog. He and his dog soon become an unbeatable team when it comes to catching and arresting bad guys. One day Harry meets young Gerda Lind while walking Greif. She works as a dancer and Harry quickly falls in love with her. Harry promises to attend her next dance performance, but something comes up: the house of a Mr. Müller is being raided by burglars and Harry is called to action with the trusty Greif.

While Harry stays behind, Greif picks up the trail and quickly confronts the crooks. But Greif reacts completely differently than expected, because the man standing in front of him is Emil Kruppack, Greif's former owner, who used to call his dog Rolf. The animal happily greets its former owner. When Sergeant Schütz catches up with the two, he gets attacked by the dog at Kruppack's command. The officer is completely perplexed and tries to defend himself against the animal attack. Kruppack fires a gun at the officer and then runs off, with the police dog Greif at his side. The police arrest Kruppack's brother Max. Harry finds Schütz seriously injured and later visits him at the hospital. He is shocked to learn that Greif apparently went along with the criminal without hesitation. Harry now knows that if Greif is ever found again, he can no longer rely on him.

In the meantime, Emil Kruppack has hired a shady character to kill Greif, since the dog’s behavior would sooner or later betray him to the police. Greif is able to escape and returns to Harry Peters. Both are overjoyed to see each other again. In the meantime, several connections have been uncovered that lead Harry to believe that Gerda could be in cahoots with Kruppack. Harry summons Gerda to police headquarters for interrogation. It turns out that Gerda and Kruppack know each other, because the young woman had once filed charges against the crook, who then swore revenge on her.

A new line of enquiry is opened. Emmi Gärtner, the bride of the robbed Mr. Müller, admits that Müller is actually Kruppack's fence and that he short-changed Kruppack some time ago. Fearing for her lover, she reveals anything that could lead to Kruppack's arrest. She tells the officers that a meeting has been arranged between Müller and Kruppack. Harry Peters wants to use the opportunity to arrest the latter. He doesn't want to take Greif with him because he doubts his reliability and he does not want to expose him once more to his conflicting loyalties. But Greif turns out to be Harry's eponymous "best friend" and secretly follows him. When Müller sees the police, he immediately tries to flee, but runs straight into Peters' arms. Kruppack joins them and threatens Harry with a gun. A fight ensues and a shot is fired. The dog throws himself into the fray for Harry and is badly injured by the bullet. Kruppack is arrested. Greif drags himself into a side room where Harry finds his best friend dead. Gerda and he become a couple.

== Cast ==
- Harry Piel as Harry Peters, Kriminal-Assistant
- Edna Greyff as Gerda Lind, Tänzerin
- Henry Lorenzen as Erich Wilke
- Alfred Haase as Hildebrandt, Kriminalrat
- Jochen Hauer as Schütz, Oberwachtmeister
- Ernst Legal as Emil Müller, Hausverwalter
- Trude Hesterberg as Emmi Gärtner
- Lissy Arna as Frau Woerden, Pensionsinhaberin
- Paul Westermeier as Emil Kruppack / William Hopkins
- Willi Schur as Max Kruppack
- Erich Teske as Paule Werner
- Eva Tinschmann as Frau Kruse, Aufwartung
- Gerhard Dammann as Willi Knorr, Hundehändler
- Gertrud Wolle as Kassiererin in der 'Barberina'
- Aribert Grimmer as Karl
- Philipp Manning as Kriminalbeamter
- Otto Stoeckel as Kriminalkommissar
- Aruth Wartan as Kaminski - Eisenbahnräuber
- Hanns Waschatko as Kriminalkommissar
- Albrecht Bethge as Kriminalbeamter
- Johanna Ewald as Ältere Dame im Ausflugslokal
- Schäferhund Greif as Schäferhund
- Hedwig Hildebrandt as Ältere Dame im Ausflugslokal
- Alfred Karen as Gast in der 'Barberina'
- Else Mereny as Ältere Dame im Ausflugslokal
- Karl Platen as Beamter im Inseratenbüro
- Else Reval as Garderobenfrau bei Gerda Lind
- Goldene Sieben as Musikkapelle
- Ilse Sommer as Kellnerin im Ausflugslokal

== Bibliography ==
- Rentschler, Eric (1996). The Ministry of Illusion: Nazi Cinema and Its Afterlife. Harvard University Press. ISBN 978-0-674-57640-7.
