= The Girl from the Rhine =

1922 film

- German: Du Mädel vom Rhein
- Directed by: Hans Felsing
- Starring: Ellen Plessow
- Cinematography: Charles Paulus
- Production company: Sing-Film
- Distributed by: Sing-Film
- Release date: 25 November 1922
- Country: Germany
- Languages: Silent; German intertitles

The Girl from the Rhine (German: Du Mädel vom Rhein) is a 1922 German silent romance film directed by Hans Felsing and starring Ellen Plessow.

== Cast ==
In alphabetical order

- Paul Conradi as Winegrower Anton Langbein
- Vera Conti as recruiter
- Carl Geppert
- Melitta Klefer as Christl Pröppke, daughter
- Manfred Koempel-Pilot as Lotse Jörg
- Ellen Plessow as Frau Langbein
- Fritz Russ as Pröppke, village schoolmaster
- Mizzi Schütz as Anna Pröppke
- Emil Stammer as Pensioner Kußlich
- Helene Voß as Lene Voß
- Gustav Zeitzschel
