= One Minute to Twelve =

1925 film directed by Nunzio Malasomma

- Directed by: Nunzio Malasomma
- Produced by: Jakob Karol; Hans von Wolzogen
- Starring: Luciano Albertini; Charlotte Ander; Elsa Wagner
- Cinematography: Gustave Preiss
- Music by: Giuseppe Becce
- Production company: Jakob Karol Film
- Distributed by: Bavaria Film
- Release date: 17 December 1925
- Country: Germany
- Languages: Silent; German intertitles

One Minute to Twelve (German: Eine Minute vor Zwölf) is a 1925 German silent drama film directed by Nunzio Malasomma and starring Luciano Albertini, Charlotte Ander and Elsa Wagner.

In 1927 it was released in Britain by Gaumont British Distributors.

== Cast ==
- Luciano Albertini as Fred
- Charlotte Ander as Mary - eine Modistin
- Elsa Wagner as Freds Mutter
- Oreste Bilancia as Der Marquis Belplano
- Hugo Döblin as Der Chefredakteur der 'Schnellsten Nachrichten'
- Anna Gorilowa as Die Marquise Belplano
- Barbara von Annenkoff as Die Fürstin von Kantorowitz

== Bibliography ==
- Grange, William. Cultural Chronicle of the Weimar Republic. Scarecrow Press, 2008.
