= Girls, Beware! =

1928 film directed by Valy Arnheim

- Directed by: Valy Arnheim
- Written by: William Kahn; Hans Tintner; Heinrich Leopold Wagner (play)
- Produced by: William Kahn
- Starring: Gritta Ley; Egon von Jordan; Hanni Weisse
- Cinematography: Eugen Hamm
- Production company: William Kahn-Film
- Distributed by: Defa-Deutsche Fox
- Release date: 16 February 1928
- Country: Germany
- Languages: Silent; German intertitles

Girls, Beware! (German: Mädchen, hütet Euch!) is a 1928 German silent drama film directed by Valy Arnheim and starring Gritta Ley, Egon von Jordan and Hanni Weisse.

The film's sets were designed by the art director August Rinaldi.

== Cast ==
- Gritta Ley
- Egon von Jordan
- Hanni Weisse
- Valy Arnheim
- Eugen Burg
- Toni Ebärg
- Olga Engl
- Rudolf Lettinger
- Iwa Wanja

== Bibliography ==
- Hans-Jürgen Lange. Otto Rahn und die Suche nach dem Gral: Biografie und Quellen. Arun, 1999.
