= Filmarchiv Austria =

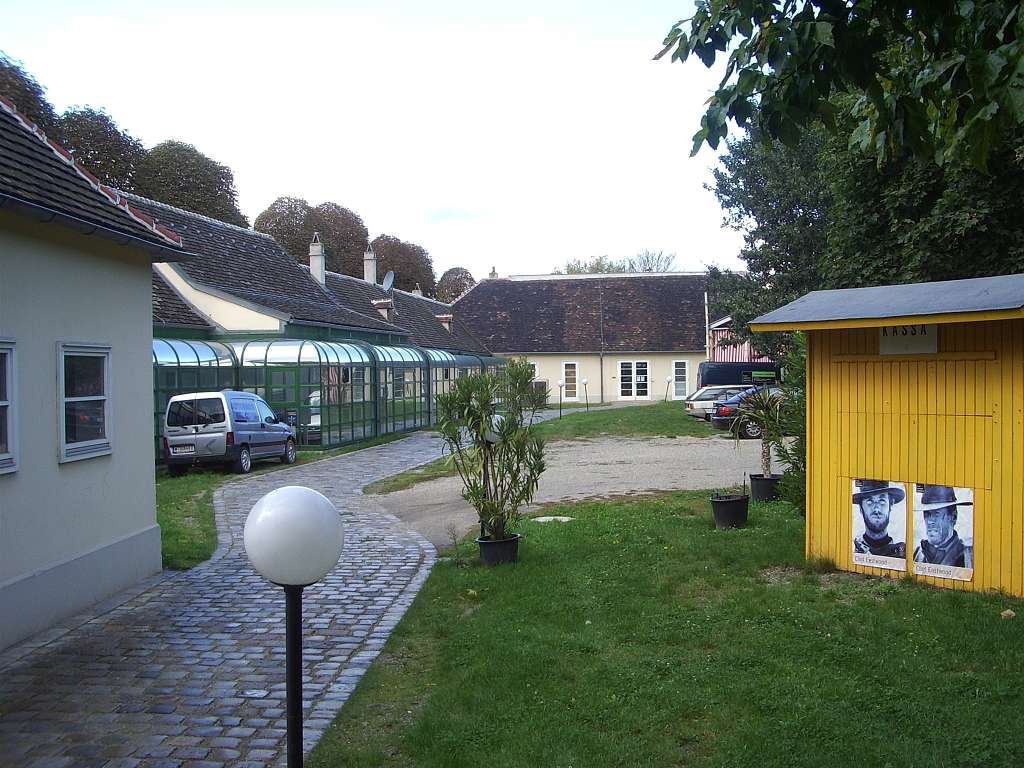
Filmarchiv Austria, Augarten

The Filmarchiv Austria ("Austrian Film Archive") is an organisation for the discovery, reconstruction and preservation of Austrian film record material: films themselves, literature about film and cinema, or film-related periodicals. With over 260,000 film titles, 2,000,000 photographs and stills, 48,000 cinema programmes, 16,000 film posters, 30,000 books, and an extensive collection of apparatus, documents and costumes, it is the largest such organisation in Austria.

Research is always in progress on particular topics in order to enlarge the film content, covering all genres from advertising footage to experimental projects to light entertainment films. Of all the existing Austrian productions in the world from before 1945, over 95% are kept in the Filmarchiv Austria.

The Filmarchiv Austria is a member of FIAF (the International Federation of Film Archives).

== History ==
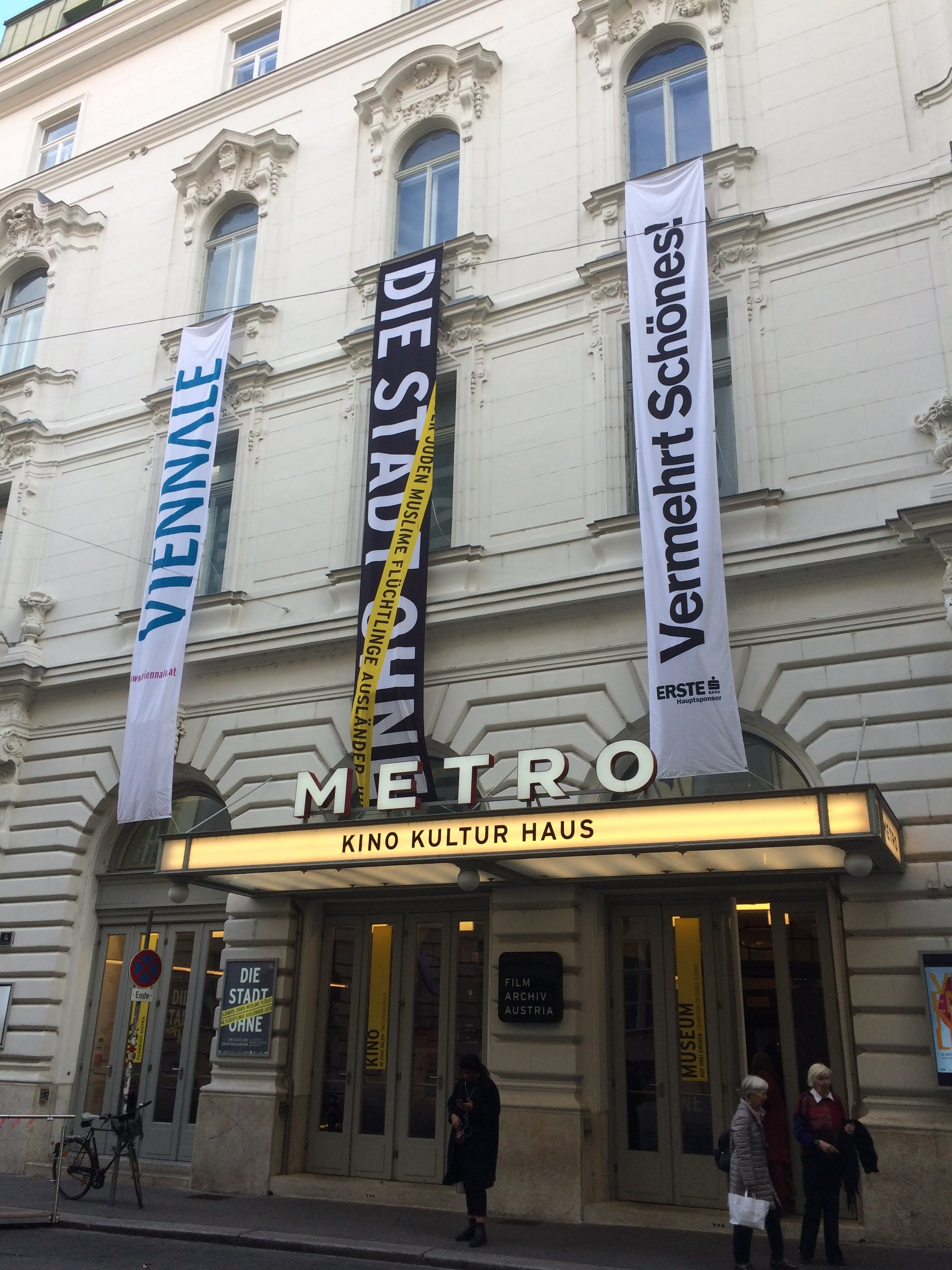
Metro Kinokulturhaus in Vienna, run by Filmarchiv Austria

The present Filmarchiv Austria was founded on 17 October 1955, as the Österreichische Filmarchiv (ÖFA) ("Austrian Film Archive").

The first reconstruction of film material by the ÖFA, in 1961, was the 1926 film version of Der Rosenkavalier. Other major reconstruction projects have included the first Austrian feature film productions, those of Saturn-Film; the oldest extant Austrian drama film, Der Müller und sein Kind of 1911; and the classics Orlacs Hände ("The Hands of Orlac") and Die Sklavenkönigin ("The Slave Queen" or "The Moon of Israel"), which without this work would have remained inaccessible to the viewing public.

The Filmarchiv Austria, together with Der Standard, is also responsible for the selection and production of Der österreichische Film, an authoritative DVD series of significant Austrian films, consisting so far of 50 parts.

In 1965 a systematic programme began of conversion of film prints on the highly unstable cellulose nitrate base, which remained in commercial use into the 1950s, to security film.

In 1968 new premises were found in the Rauhensteingasse in central Vienna, while new storage and exhibition facilities were established in the Altes Schloss ("Old Castle"), Laxenburg. In 1997 the Österreichische Filmarchiv changed its name to Filmarchiv Austria, and established new central facilities at the Audiovisuelles Zentrum Wien-Augarten.

In 2001 the Filmarchiv-Studienzentrum was opened in the Augarten premises, incorporating the Filmdokumentationszentrum, formerly the largest private collection of film-related material in Austria, founded in 1965 by Herbert Holba and the film historian Peter Spiegel, on the basis of an earlier collection begun in 1945.

== Collections ==
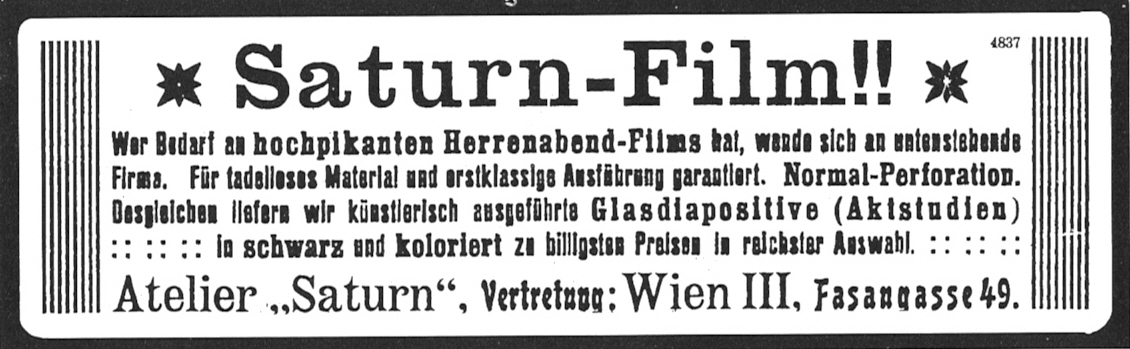
Advertisements for Saturn-Film productions, the earliest known Austrian feature films (Filmarchiv collection)

The collections of the Filmarchiv Austria comprehensively document Austrian cultural and social history. The oldest titles preserved are the sequences of Vienna taken by the Lumière Brothers in 1896. The oldest preserved native Austrian film is the documentary Der Kaiserbesuch in Braunau/Inn ("Visit of the Kaiser to Braunau am Inn") from 1903, shot by Johann Bläser, proprietor of a travelling film show, while the earliest extant Austrian feature films are the erotic productions of Saturn-Film from 1906 onwards.

Some of the more important collections include:

- the Goldstaub collection: a highly significant collection from the early days of the Austrian cinema, with extensive documentary footage from the time of the monarchy;
- the Reinthaler collection: Austria's largest cinematic collection from the years 1910–20;
- the Köfinger collection: tourism films from the period of silent film;
- a number of collections of cine-newsreels from the 1930s;
- the archive of the major newsreel producer Austria Wochenschau, acquired in 1997

== See also ==
- ACE Association of European Film Archives and Cinematheques

== Sources ==
- Official website
- Filmdokumentationszentrum website (in German)
