= Christian August Vulpius =

German novelist and dramatist (1762–1827)

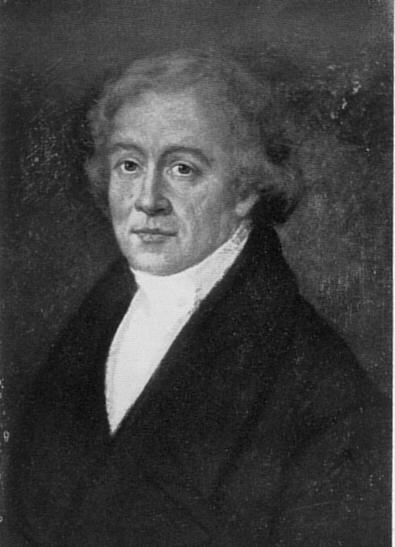
- Born: 23 January 1762; Weimar, Grand Duchy of Saxe-Weimar-Eisenach
- Died: 25 June 1827 (aged 65); Weimar, Grand Duchy of Saxe-Weimar-Eisenach, German Confederation
- Education: University of Jena; University of Erlangen
- Occupations: Novelist, dramatist
- Relatives: Christiane Vulpius (sister); Johann Wolfgang von Goethe (brother-in-law)
- Writing career
- Movement: Romanticism

Christian August Vulpius (23 January 1762 – 25 June 1827) was a German novelist and dramatist. His sister married the noted German writer Johann Wolfgang von Goethe.

== Biography ==
He was born at Weimar, and was educated at Jena and Erlangen. In 1790, he returned to Weimar, where Goethe obtained employment for him. Here, since 1788, Goethe had been contentedly living quasi-maritally with Vulpius's sister Christiane.

In Weimar, Vulpius began, in imitation of Christian Heinrich Spiess, to write a series of romantic narratives: operas, dramas and tales. Of these (about sixty in number), his The History of Rinaldo Rinaldini (1798), is the most notorious. A typical "penny dreadful" of the period, it was often translated and much imitated, but unrivaled in its bad eminence. Its scene was laid in Italy during the Middle Ages. Vulpius was also active as an editor.

In 1797, possibly through Goethe's influence, Vulpius obtained employment at the Weimar library, of which he became chief librarian in 1806. In the latter year, Goethe also formally married Christiane. Christian died at Weimar on 25 June 1827.

== Legacy ==
There are two filmed works based on Vulpius' most renowned penny-dread:

- Rinaldo Rinaldini (1927 film) ;
- Rinaldo Rinaldini (TV series with 13 episodes produced in 1968).

== Notes ==
- Gilman, D. C.; Peck, H. T.; Colby, F. M., eds. (1905). "Vulpius, Christian August" . New International Encyclopedia (1st ed.). New York: Dodd, Mead.
- Gilman, D. C.; Peck, H. T.; Colby, F. M., eds. (1906). "Goethe, Johann Wolfgang von" . New International Encyclopedia (1st ed.). New York: Dodd, Mead.

Attribution:
