= The Midnight Waltz =

1929 film

- Directed by: Heinz Paul
- Written by: Adolf Schirokauer
- Starring: Elisabeth Pinajeff; André Mattoni; Gritta Ley
- Cinematography: Hans Theyer
- Music by: Robert Stolz
- Production company: Ottol-Film
- Release date: 26 July 1929
- Country: Austria
- Languages: Silent; German intertitles

The Midnight Waltz (German: Der Mitternachtswalzer) is a 1929 Austrian silent romantic comedy film directed by Heinz Paul and starring Elisabeth Pinajeff, André Mattoni and Gritta Ley. It was shot at the Schönbrunn Studios in Vienna. The film's sets were designed by the art director Hans Ledersteger. The plot was based on the 1926 operetta of the same title by Robert Stolz.

== Cast ==
- Elisabeth Pinajeff
- André Mattoni
- Gritta Ley
- Carmen Cartellieri
- Malcolm Tod
- Leo Peukert
- Paul Biensfeldt
- Otto Schmöle

== Bibliography ==
- Büttner, Elisabeth & Dewald, Christian. Das tägliche Brennen: eine Geschichte des österreichischen Films von den Anfängen bis 1945. Residenz, 2002.
- Krenn, Günter. Zauber der Boheme: Marta Eggerth, Jan Kiepura und der deutschsprachige Musikfilm. Filmarchiv Austria, 2002.
