= The Ravine of Death =

1923 German film

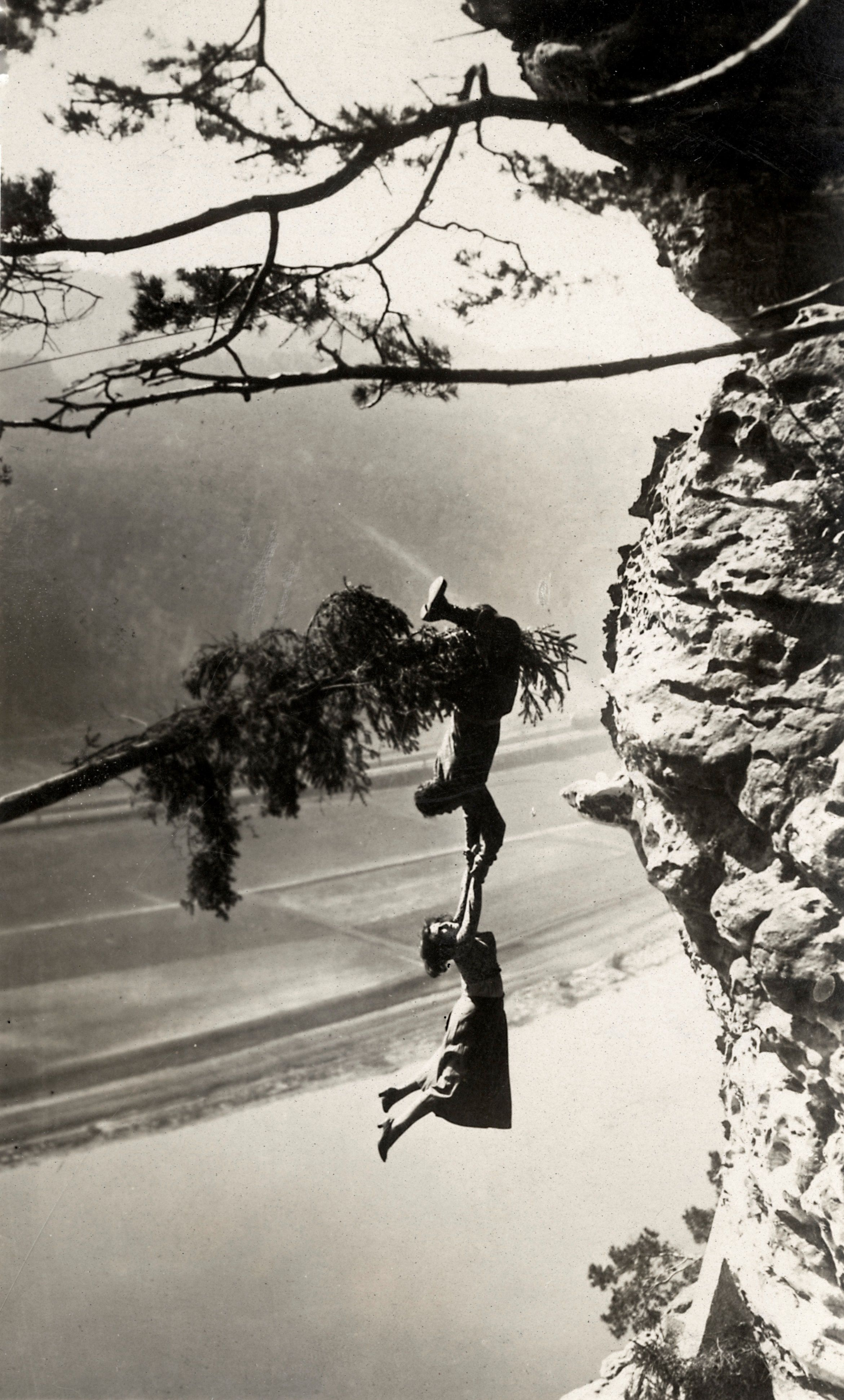
- Luciano Albertini and Lya De Putti
- Directed by: Luciano Albertini; Albert-Francis Bertoni; Max Obal
- Written by: Luciano Albertini; Albert-Francis Bertoni
- Produced by: Luciano Albertini
- Starring: Luciano Albertini; Lya De Putti; Hermann Picha
- Cinematography: Leo Klaude; Giovanni Vitrotti
- Production company: Albertini-Film
- Distributed by: Phoebus Film
- Release date: 11 May 1923
- Country: Germany
- Languages: Silent; German intertitles

The Ravine of Death or Cage of Death (German: Die Schlucht des Todes) is a 1923 German silent thriller film directed by Luciano Albertini, Albert-Francis Bertoni and Max Obal. It starred Albertini, Lya De Putti and Hermann Picha.

== Cast ==
- Luciano Albertini as Manuelo - cowboy
- Lya De Putti as Rosita - his wife
- Hermann Picha as Baron Alleardi
- Heinz Sarnow as Count Giani
- Gertrude Hoffman as Countess Gabriela

== Bibliography ==
- Bock, Hans-Michael & Bergfelder, Tim. The Concise CineGraph. Encyclopedia of German Cinema. Berghahn Books, 2009.
