= Der Müller und sein Kind =

1911 film directed by Walter Friedmann

- Directed by: Walter Friedemann
- Based on: Play by Ernst Raupach
- Produced by: Österreichisch-Ungarische Kinoindustrie
- Starring: Max Bing
- Cinematography: Joseph Delmont
- Release date: 21 October 1911
- Running time: 22 minutes
- Country: Austria
- Languages: Silent film (German intertitles)

Der Müller und sein Kind (The Miller and His Child) is a silent film released in 1911 and is the oldest Austrian drama film to survive in its entirety. It was produced by the Österreichisch-Ungarische Kinoindustrie, which later in 1911 changed its name to the Wiener Kunstfilm-Industrie. The same company had filmed the same plot the previous year, but no footage from that earlier version survives.

The film is based on the late Romantic supernatural melodrama by German playwright Ernst Raupach, a very popular work that was first performed to great acclaim in 1830 at the Burgtheater in Vienna. Thereafter it was performed in many theatres at Halloween well into the 20th century. The film had its premiere on 21 October 1911 in Vienna.

According to the producers the film had a length of around 600 metres, on 35 mm nitrate film. The drama was filmed in 19 scenes, and at a projection speed of 16 frames per second, common in early silent films, lasted 21 minutes and 50 seconds. Although the Filmarchiv Austria, which preserves the film, has 150 metres less, the action of the film is nevertheless complete, although the ends of the individual reels are too abrupt, and the end of scene 19 is missing.

Technical direction was by Joseph Delmont, later a director of animal films and crime films, who among other things operated the camera by a hand crank.

== Plot ==
Konrad, a poor miller's son, wants to marry Marie, the daughter of a rich miller. Marie's father, who is a widower, is malicious and avaricious, and he tricks the young lovers in a despicable way. The imminent demise of the miller and his innocent daughter is foreshadowed by the appearance of the bird of death and the graveyard ghost.

== Cast ==
- Max Bing as Konrad, son of a poor miller
- Else Heller as rich miller's daughter Marie
- Theodor Weiß as rich miller
- Ernst Lunzer as the landlord
- Herr Ludwig as the priest
