= The Man on the Comet =

1925 film

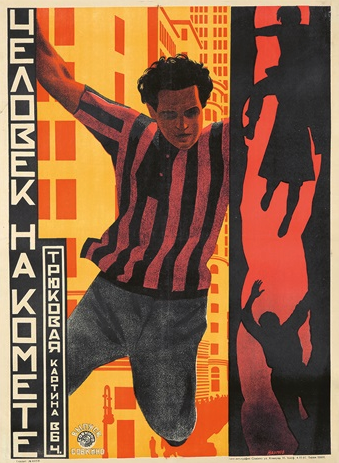
- Poster by Alexander Ilyich Naumov for Soviet distribution of the film
- Directed by: Alfred Halm
- Written by: Alfred Halm
- Starring: Luciano Albertini; Maly Delschaft; Erwied Astor
- Cinematography: Willy Großstück; Giovanni Vitrotti
- Production company: Phoebus Film
- Distributed by: Phoebus Film
- Release date: March 12, 1925
- Country: Germany
- Languages: Silent; German intertitles

The Man on the Comet (German: Der Mann auf dem Kometen) is a 1925 German silent adventure film directed by Alfred Halm starring Luciano Albertini, Maly Delschaft, and Elena Lunda.

The film's art direction was led by Willi Herrmann.

== Cast ==
- Luciano Albertini as Tom Winston - ein Matrose
- Maly Delschaft
- Erwied Astor as Teddy Ellis - ein Ingenieur
- Vita Gardy as Christa - Frau Ellis Schwester
- Anna Gorilowa as La Prima Ballerina
- Rudolf Klein-Rhoden as Kapitän Fergusson
- Friedrich Kühne as Navarro - ein Artist
- Rudolf Lettinger as Benjamin
- Elena Lunda as Evelyn
- Lidiya F. Ryndina as Frau Ellis - Teddys Frau
- Marinka Spadoni as Die Mondgöttin
- Georgette von Platty as Amor
- Aruth Wartan as Carlo - ein Artist

== Bibliography ==
- Grange, William. Cultural Chronicle of the Weimar Republic. Scarecrow Press, 2008.
