= The Woman from the Folies Bergères =

1927 film by Joe Francis and Max Obal

The Women from the Folies Bergères
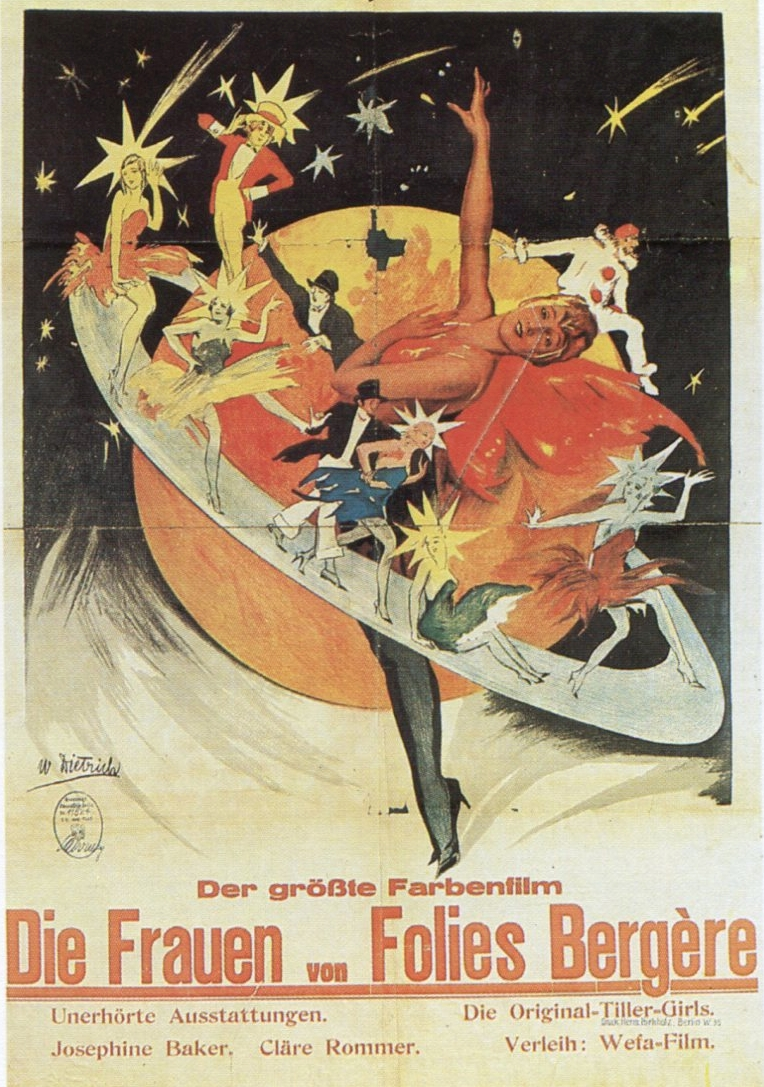
- German release poster
- Directed by: Joe Francis; Max Obal
- Written by: Max Obal
- Starring: Claire Rommer; Carl Auen; Josephine Baker
- Cinematography: Giovanni Vitrotti
- Music by: Felix Bartsch
- Production company: Cando-Film
- Distributed by: Bezirksverleiher
- Release date: February 1927
- Countries: France; Germany
- Languages: Silent; German intertitles

The Women from the Folies Bergères (German: Die Frauen von Folies Bergères) is a 1927 French-German silent film directed by Joe Francis and Max Obal and starring Claire Rommer, Carl Auen and Josephine Baker. It was shot at the Johannisthal Studios in Berlin. The film's sets were designed by the art director Hermann Warm.

== Cast ==
- Claire Rommer
- Carl Auen
- Josephine Baker
- Pépa Bonafé
- Hilde Jennings
- Margarete Lanner
- Marysa
- Original John Tiller Girls
- Gyula Szőreghy
- Das Trio Komarova-Korgine-Sergine
- Tygma

== Bibliography ==
- Lamprecht, Gerhard. Deutsche Stummfilme. Gesamtregister. Deutsche Kinemathek, 1970.
- Rège, Philippe. Encyclopedia of French Film Directors, Volume 1. Scarecrow Press, 2009.
