= The Uncanny House =

1916 film directed by Richard Oswald

- Directed by: Richard Oswald
- Written by: Richard Oswald; Robert Liebmann
- Produced by: Richard Oswald
- Starring: Werner Krauss; Reinhold Schünzel; Lupu Pick
- Cinematography: Max Fassbender
- Production company: Richard-Oswald-Produktion
- Release dates: 22 September 1916 (Part I); 27 October 1916 (Part II); 10 November 1916 (Part III)
- Country: Germany
- Languages: Silent; German intertitles

The Uncanny House (German: Das unheimliche Haus) is a 1916 German silent mystery film directed by Richard Oswald and starring Werner Krauss, Reinhold Schünzel and Lupu Pick. It was released in three parts. The second part was called Der chinesische Götze and the third Freitag, der 13.

The film's sets were designed by the art director Manfred Noa.

== Cast ==
=== Part I ===
- Werner Krauss as Albert von Sievers
- Alfred Breiderhoff as Diener
- Lupu Pick as Arthur Wüllner
- Kathe Oswald as Kammerzofe
- Rita Clermont as Frau im Spiegel
- Heinz Sarnow as Fritz Bodmer
- Max Bing as Martin Whist
- Arnold Czempin
- Max Gülstorff as Fox' Freund Fix
- Nelly Lagarst as Frau Eibner
- Ernst Ludwig as Herbert von Eulenstein
- Hans Marton as Sohn Marcel Eulenstein
- Emil Rameau as Herr Eibner
- Franz Ramharter as Leonie Cardailhan (Schwester)
- Reinhold Schünzel as Engelbert Fox
- Kissa von Sievers as Mary Seeber

== Bibliography ==
- Bock, Hans-Michael & Bergfelder, Tim. The Concise CineGraph. Encyclopedia of German Cinema. Berghahn Books, 2009.
