= Lives in Danger =

1926 film

- Directed by: Karl Gerhardt
- Written by: Curt J. Braun; Wilhelm Stücklen
- Produced by: Luciano Albertini
- Starring: Luciano Albertini; Ruth Weyher; Raimondo Van Riel
- Cinematography: Giovanni Vitrotti
- Production company: Albertini-Film
- Distributed by: Bavaria Film
- Release date: 28 April 1926
- Country: Germany
- Languages: Silent; German intertitles

Lives in Danger (German: Menschenleben in Gefahr) is a 1926 German silent adventure film directed by Karl Gerhardt and starring Luciano Albertini, Ruth Weyher, and Raimondo Van Riel.

The film's sets were designed by the art director Robert A. Dietrich.

== Cast ==
- Luciano Albertini as Luciano
- Ruth Weyher as Eveline
- Raimondo Van Riel as Emilio Reval
- Anna Gorilowa
- Georgette von Platty

== Bibliography ==
- Gerhard Lamprecht. Deutsche Stummfilme, Volume 8.
