= The Criminal of the Century =

1928 film directed by Max Obal

- Directed by: Max Obal
- Written by: Max Obal; Hans Rameau; Ludwig von Wohl (novel)
- Produced by: Gabriel Levy
- Starring: Luciano Albertini; Gritta Ley; Hans Albers
- Cinematography: Edoardo Lamberti; Hans Theyer
- Music by: Felix Bartsch
- Production company: Aafa-Film
- Distributed by: Aafa-Film
- Release date: 19 January 1928
- Running time: 98 minutes
- Country: Germany
- Languages: Silent; German intertitles

The Criminal of the Century (German: Der größte Gauner des Jahrhunderts) is a 1928 German silent crime film directed by Max Obal and starring Luciano Albertini, Gritta Ley, and Hans Albers. It was shot at the Staaken Studios in Berlin. The film's art direction was by Jacek Rotmil.

== Cast ==
- Luciano Albertini as Gino Gadari
- Gritta Ley as Liane Serano
- Hans Albers as Aristide Trasymopolus
- Vivian Gibson as Fiametta de Guarino, eine Tänzerin
- Hans Mierendorff as Alberto Dorna, ein Bankier
- Lydia Potechina as Angelica Dorna, Albertos Frau
- Fritz Greiner as Kapitän Tawil
- Hugo Fischer-Köppe as Tito Spinelli

== Bibliography ==
- Grange, William (2008). Cultural Chronicle of the Weimar Republic. Lanham, MD: Scarecrow Press. ISBN 978-0-8108-5967-8.
