= Max Bing =

German actor and radio director

Max Bing (15 March 1885 – 7 February 1945) was a German actor and director of radio plays.

== Biography ==
Bing was born in Dresden. He received his first theatrical engagement in 1903 at the Ducal Meiningen Court Theatre, Meiningen (Herzogliches Hoftheater Meiningen or Meininger Theater). After that he performed in, among other places, Düsseldorf, Vienna, Brno, Stuttgart and Berlin. During his time in Vienna he appeared in the two early Austrian silent films Die Glückspuppe and Der Müller und sein Kind. but afterwards appeared only occasionally in front of the camera in Germany. On 10 October 1917 he was awarded the Charlottenkreuz.

From 1927 he concentrated on his work as a director and narrator in the Funk-Stunde Berlin (Berlin Radio), where among other things he produced in 1930 Die Geschichte vom Franz Biberkopf with Heinrich George in the leading role.

On 1 October 1942 Bing took on a new position as artistic director of the Tobis Film Company. He died on 7 February 1945 in Jauernig in the Sudetenland (now Javorník in the Czech Republic). His son Herman Bing died two years later in the United States.

== Filmography ==
- 1911: Die Glückspuppe
- 1911: Der Müller und sein Kind
- 1916: Der rote Streifen
- The Uncanny House (1916)
- The Third Watch (1924)
- 1939: Die Stimme aus dem Äther
- 1940: Die letzte Runde
- 1941: Immer nur Du
- 1941: Walzer ihres Lebens

== Sources and external links ==
- Max Bing at IMDb
