= André Mattoni =

Austrian actor (1900–1985)

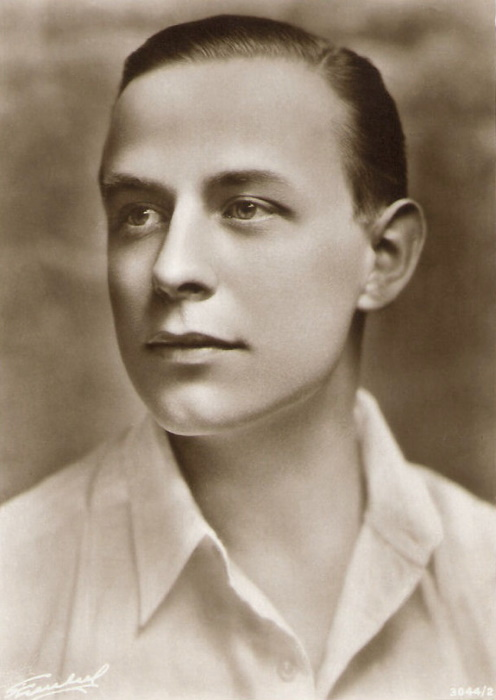
- Mattoni c. 1926
- Born: Andreas Leo Otto Edler von Mattoni; 24 February 1900; Karlsbad, Kingdom of Bohemia, Austro-Hungarian Empire (now, Karlovy Vary, Czech Republic)
- Died: 11 January 1985 (aged 84); Vienna, Austria
- Occupation: Actor
- Years active: 1922–1978

André Mattoni (born Andreas Leo Otto Edler von Mattoni; 24 February 1900 – 11 January 1985) was an Austrian actor. His paternal grandfather was Heinrich Kaspar von Mattoni, founder of the Mattoni mineral water company. His mother was Adele Juliana Pupp-Mattoni from the Pupp hotelier family.

Mattoni was originally cast in Fritz Lang's Metropolis (1927) but was replaced by Gustav Fröhlich four weeks into shooting.

== Selected filmography ==
- The Telephone Operator (1925)
- Wood Love (1925)
- The Found Bride (1925)
- Why Get a Divorce? (1926)
- Tartuffe (1926)
- Svengali (1927)
- Youth Astray (1927)
- Light Cavalry (1927)
- The Student Prince in Old Heidelberg (1927)
- Charlotte Somewhat Crazy (1928)
- Mary's Big Secret (1928)
- The Veil Dancer (1929)
- They May Not Marry (1929)
- The Midnight Waltz (1929)
- Beware of Loose Women (1929)
- Street Acquaintances (1929)
- Wenn Du noch eine Heimat hast (1930)
- Ein süsses Geheimnis (1932)
- Spies at Work (1933)
- Her Highness Dances the Waltz (1935)
- Red Tavern (1940)
- Much Ado About Nixi (1942)
- Abenteuer im Grand Hotel (1943)
- Viennese Girls (1945)

== Bibliography ==
- Eisner, Lotte H. The Haunted Screen: Expressionism in the German Cinema and the Influence of Max Reinhardt. University of California Press, 2008.
