= The Runaway Girl =

1928 film

- Directed by: Hanns Schwarz
- Written by: Ludwig Fulda (play); Robert Siodmak; Rolf E. Vanloo
- Produced by: Joe May; Seymour Nebenzal
- Starring: Käthe von Nagy; Vivian Gibson; Jean Dax
- Cinematography: Werner Brandes
- Music by: Willy Schmidt-Gentner
- Production company: Nero-Film
- Distributed by: Deutsche Lichtspiel-Syndikat
- Release date: 19 April 1928
- Running time: 92 minutes
- Country: Germany
- Languages: Silent; German intertitles

The Runaway Girl (German: Die Durchgängerin) is a 1928 German silent comedy film directed by Hanns Schwarz and starring Käthe von Nagy, Vivian Gibson and Jean Dax. The film's sets were designed by the art director Erich Zander.

== Cast ==
- Käthe von Nagy as Ilsebill
- Vivian Gibson as Gina, ihre Mutter
- Jean Dax as Oberregierungsrat R. Thoms, ihr Vater
- Hans Brausewetter as Hans Brausewetter
- Mathias Wieman as Vladimir Pekoff, ein Komponist
- Karl Platen as Franz, Diener im Hause Thoms
- Adele Sandrock as Leokadia Spannagel, Direktorin des Mädchenpensionats

== Bibliography ==
- Bock, Hans-Michael & Bergfelder, Tim. The Concise CineGraph. Encyclopedia of German Cinema. Berghahn Books, 2009.
