= Rinaldo Rinaldini (film) =

1927 film by Max Obal and Rudolf Dworsky

- Hungarian release poster
- Directed by: Max Obal; Rudolf Dworsky
- Written by: Christian August Vulpius (novel); Toni Dathe-Fabri; Paul Rosenhayn
- Produced by: Leo Meyer
- Starring: Luciano Albertini; Olga Engl; Grit Haid; Hans Albers
- Cinematography: Willy Hameister; Edoardo Lamberti
- Music by: Felix Bartsch
- Production company: Aafa-Film
- Distributed by: Aafa-Film
- Release date: 25 February 1927
- Running time: 91 minutes
- Country: Germany
- Languages: Silent; German intertitles

Rinaldo Rinaldini is a 1927 German silent adventure film directed by Max Obal and Rudolf Dworsky and starring Luciano Albertini, Olga Engl, and Grit Haid. The film is an Italian-set swashbuckler, based on Christian August Vulpius's 1797 novel The History of Rinaldo Rinaldini. Filming took place at the Staaken Studios in Berlin. The film's sets were designed by the art directors Alfred Kunz and Franz Meschkan.

== Cast ==
- Luciano Albertini as Rinaldo Rinaldini, Räuberhauptmann / Marchese Salantieri
- Olga Engl as Marchesa de Candido
- Grit Haid as Linda, ihre Tochter
- Hans Albers as Baron Salvi
- Elisabeth Pinajeff as Beatrice, eine Tänzerin
- Eugen Burg as Ein Bankier
- Angelo Rossi as Der Diener des Marchese
- Hermann Picha as Ein Polizeihauptmann

== Bibliography ==
- Grange, William (2008). Cultural Chronicle of the Weimar Republic. Lanham, MD: Scarecrow Press. ISBN 978-0-8108-5967-8.
