= Nunzio Malasomma =

Italian film director (1894–1974)

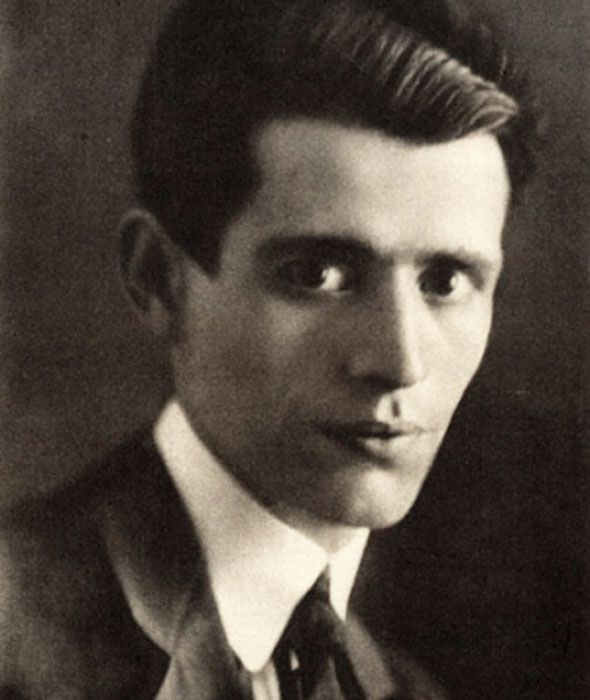
- Born: 4 February 1894; Caserta, Kingdom of Italy
- Died: 12 January 1974 (aged 79); Rome, Italy
- Occupation(s): Film director Screenwriter
- Years active: 1920-1968

Nunzio Malasomma (4 February 1894 – 12 January 1974) was an Italian film director and screenwriter. He directed 41 films between 1923 and 1968.

== Selected filmography ==
- Red Love (1921)
- Mister Radio (1924)
- Orient (1924)
- The Doll Queen (1925)
- One Minute to Twelve (1925)
- The King and the Girl (1925)
- Hunted People (1926)
- Struggle for the Matterhorn (1928)
- The Call of the North (1929)
- The Son of the White Mountain (1930)
- The Man with the Claw (1931)
- The Opera Singer (1932)
- The Telephone Operator (1932)
- The Blind Woman of Sorrento (1934)
- Territorial Militia (1935)
- I Don't Know You Anymore (1936)
- Lohengrin (1936)
- The Two Sergeants (1936)
- Red Orchids (1938)
- The Night of Decision (1938)
- The Secret Lie (1938)
- Woman Without a Past (1939)
- Then We'll Get a Divorce (1940)
- Scampolo (1941)
- Torrents of Spring (1942)
- Two Suffer Better Than One (1943)
- The White Devil (1947)
- The Devil in the Convent (1950)
- Four Red Roses (1951)
