= Luciano Albertini =

Italian actor (1882–1945)

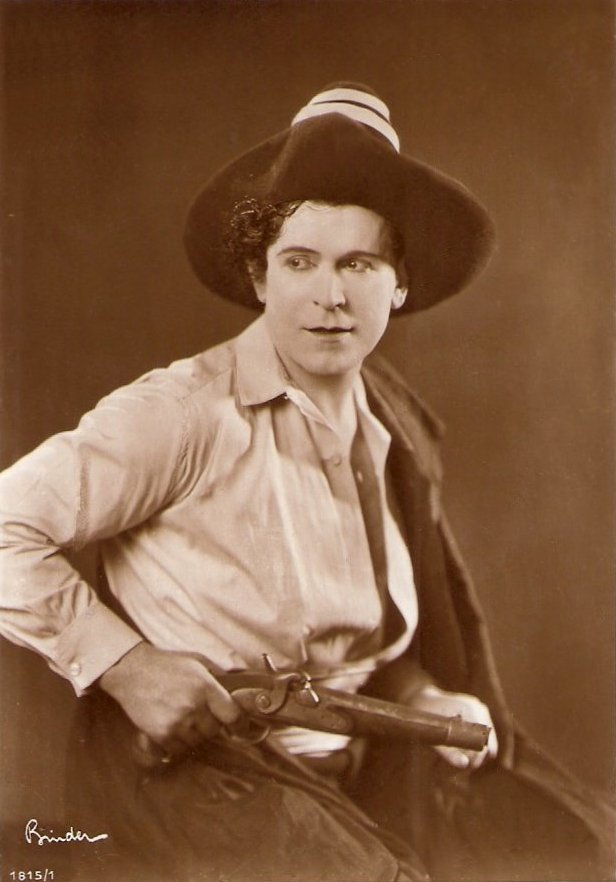
- Luciano Albertini in 1927–1928
- Born: 30 November 1882; Lugo, Emilia-Romagna, Kingdom of Italy
- Died: 6 January 1945 (aged 62); Lugo, Emilia-Romagna, Italian Social Republic
- Occupations: Film actor; Producer; Director
- Years active: 1913–1932 (film)

Luciano Albertini (30 November 1882 – 6 January 1945) was an Italian actor, film producer, and film director. After initially appearing in Italian films, he moved to Germany following the First World War. In 1921, he founded a production company Albertini-Film in partnership with Ernst Hugo Correll. During the Weimar era, he appeared in a number of silent thriller and adventure films. He starred in films with his wife Linda Albertini.

== Partial filmography ==
=== Actor ===
- Spartacus (1913)
- Assunta Spina (1915)
- The Monster of Frankenstein (1920)
- The King of the Circus Ring (1921)
- Julot the Apache (1921)
- Der Mann aus Stahl (1922)
- The Homecoming of Odysseus (1922)
- The Ravine of Death (1923)
- The Maharaja's Victory (1923)
- The Iron Man (1924)
- Mister Radio (1924)
- One Minute to Twelve (1925)
- The Man on the Comet (1925)
- The King and the Girl (1925)
- Lives in Danger (1926)
- Rinaldo Rinaldini (1927)
- The Criminal of the Century (1928)
- The Insurmountable (1928)
- Tempo! Tempo! (1929)
- Arsenal (1929)
- All is at Stake (1932)

=== Director ===
- The Man of Steel (1922)
- The Ravine of Death (1923)

== Bibliography ==
- Palumbo, Patrizia, ed. (2003). A Place in the Sun: Africa in Italian Colonial Culture from Post-Unification to the Present. Berkeley: University of California Press. ISBN 978-0-520-93626-3.
