= Almenrausch and Edelweiss (1928 film) =

1928 film directed by Franz Seitz

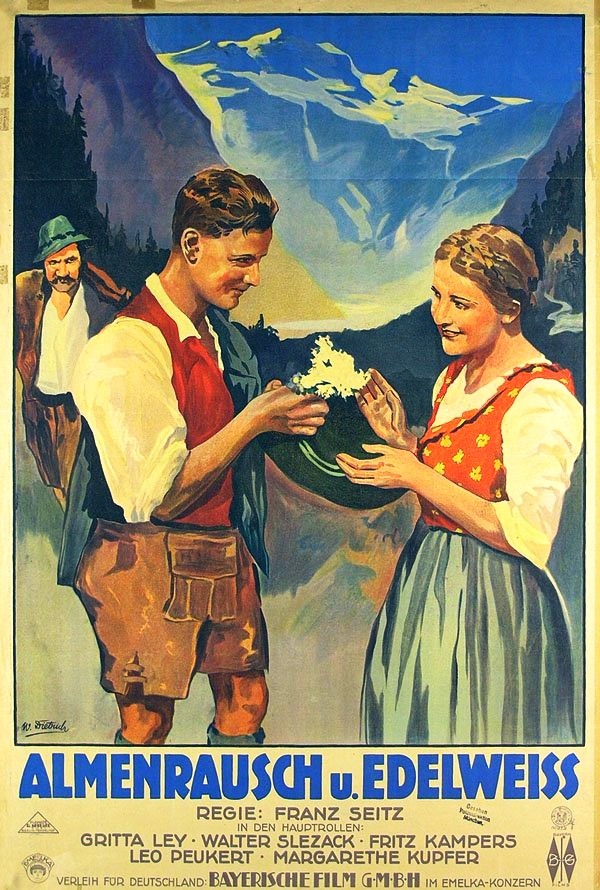
- Directed by: Franz Seitz
- Written by: Joseph Dalman; Hans Neuert (play); Hermann von Schmid (novel)
- Starring: Leo Peukert; Gritta Ley; Walter Slezak
- Cinematography: Willy Winterstein
- Production company: Münchner Lichtspielkunst
- Distributed by: Bavaria Film
- Release date: 29 March 1928
- Country: Germany
- Languages: Silent; German intertitles

Almenrausch and Edelweiss (German: Almenrausch und Edelweiss) is a 1928 German silent drama film directed by Franz Seitz and starring Leo Peukert, Gritta Ley and Walter Slezak.

It was shot at the Emelka Studios in Munich. The film's sets were designed by the art director Kurt Dürnhöfer.

== Cast ==
- Leo Peukert as Der Bühelhofbauer
- Frieda Lehndorf as Die Bühelhofbäuerin
- Walter Slezak as Mentel, beider Sohn
- Gritta Ley as Evi
- Xaver Terofal as Der Ledermüller
- Margarete Kupfer as Die Ledermüllerin
- Charlotte Susa as Kordel
- Fritz Kampers as Der Kriegelhofer Quasi
- Franz Loskarn as Der Jäger
- Harry Frank as Der Grenzer
- Max Heller as Der Kommandant
- Fanny Terofal-Mittermayr as Stasi, Näherin

== Bibliography ==
- Goble, Alan (1999). The Complete Index to Literary Sources in Film. Walter de Gruyter. ISBN 978-3-11-095194-3.
