= The History of Rinaldo Rinaldini =

1798 novel by Christian August Vulpius

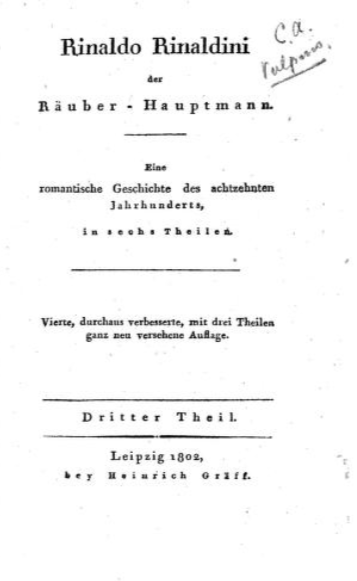
- Title page for Rinaldo Rinaldini, der Räuberhauptmann (1802 edition)
- Author: Christian August Vulpius
- Original title: Rinaldo Rinaldini, der Räuberhauptmann
- Language: German
- Genre: robber novel
- Publisher: Wienbrack
- Publication date: 1798
- Publication place: Holy Roman Empire

The History of Rinaldo Rinaldini: Captain of Banditti (German: Rinaldo Rinaldini, der Räuberhauptmann, lit. 'Rinaldo Rinaldini, the Robber Captain') is a robber novel by the German writer Christian August Vulpius. It was first published in four volumes by Wienbrack in Leipzig in 1798.

== Plot ==
The novel is about Rinaldo Rinaldini, a successful and fearsome bandit leader in the Kingdom of Naples in the 18th century.

== Sequels ==
Although the main character dies at the end, popular demand prompted Vulpius to bring him back for a sequel, published in two volumes in 1800 as Ferrandino. Fortsetzung des Räuberhauptmanns Rinaldini. Several other authors wrote their own sequels or associated stories, such as Gräfin Dionora Mortagno, Rinaldo Rinaldinis Geliebte (1801) by J. J. Brückner and Dolko, der Bandit, Zeitgenosse Rinaldo Rinaldinis (1801) by J. F. E. Albrecht.

== Adaptations ==
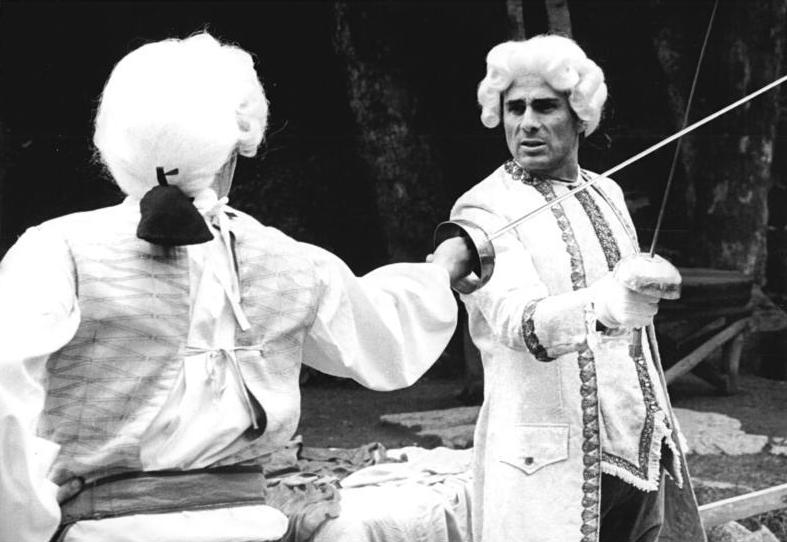
Gojko Mitić as Rinaldo in a 1984 stage adaptation

The History of Rinaldo Rinaldini was the basis for the 1927 German film Rinaldo Rinaldini and the 1968 French-West German TV series La kermesse des brigands.
