= Maciste and the Silver King's Daughter =

1922 film

- Directed by: Luigi Romano Borgnetto
- Written by: Rolf E. Vanloo
- Produced by: Jakob Karol
- Starring: Bartolomeo Pagano; Helena Makowska; Ludwig Hartau
- Production company: Jakob Karol Film
- Release date: 28 July 1922
- Countries: Germany; Italy
- Languages: Silent; German intertitles

Maciste and the Silver King's Daughter (German: Maciste und die Tochter des Silberkönigs, Italian: Maciste e la figlia del re dell'argento) is a 1922 German-Italian silent epic film directed by Luigi Romano Borgnetto and starring Bartolomeo Pagano, Helena Makowska and Ludwig Hartau. It was one of a series of films featuring the character of Maciste.

== Cast ==
- Bartolomeo Pagano as Maciste
- Helena Makowska
- Ludwig Hartau
- Hans Junkermann
- Otto Treptow
- Heinrich Peer
- Kurt Lilien
- Gerhard Ritterband

== Bibliography ==
- Roy Kinnard & Tony Crnkovich. Italian Sword and Sandal Films, 1908–1990. McFarland, 2017.
