= Joseph Delmont =

Austrian film director

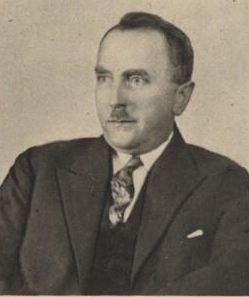
Joseph Delmont 1928.jpg

Joseph Delmont (8 May 1873 as Josef Pollak in Loiwein, Austria-Hungary – 12 March 1935 in Piešťany, Czechoslovakia) was an Austrian film director of some 200 films, largely shorts, in which he was noted for his innovative use of beasts of prey. He was also a cameraman, actor and screenplay writer. During later life he was active as an author.

== Life ==
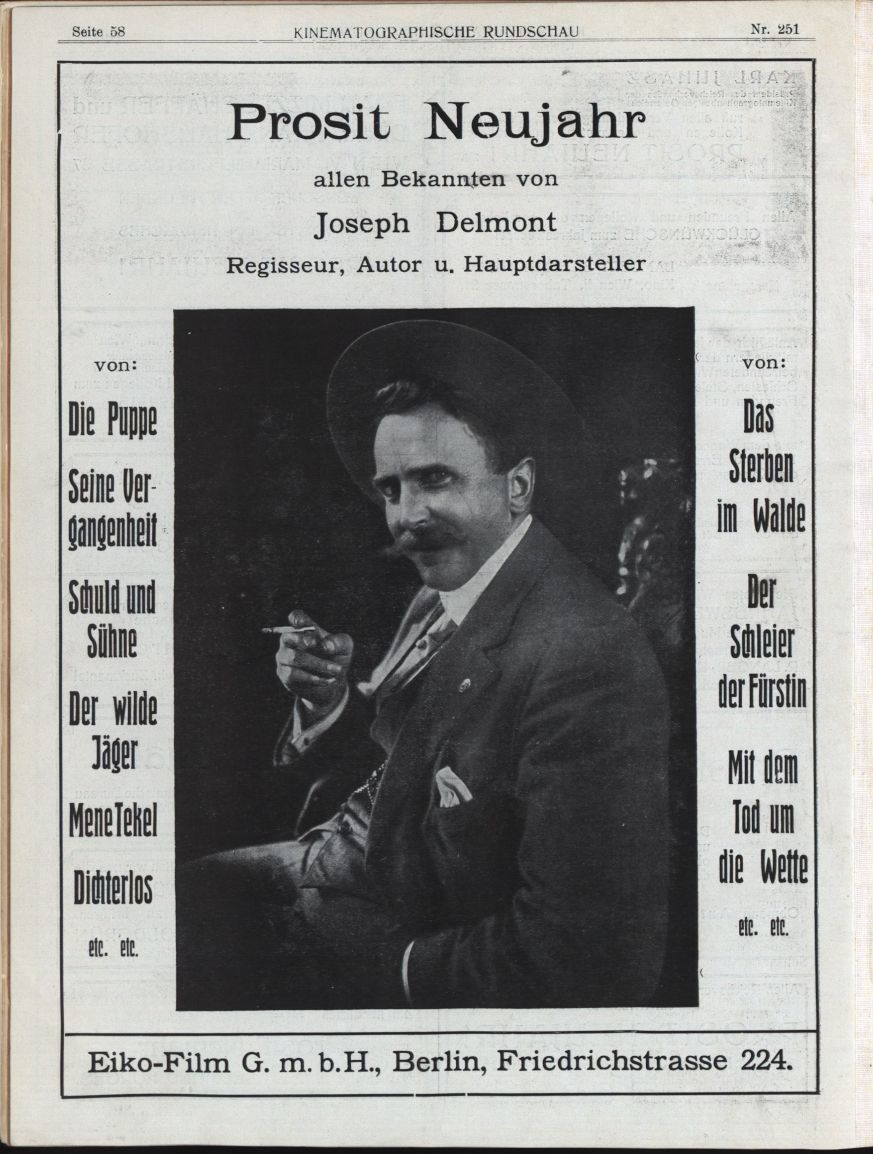
Joseph Delmont 1912

Delmont was born in 1873 as one of 16 children of Moses (later Maximilian) Pollak and Resi (or Rösi, later Theresia) née Fuchs, in Loywein, Lower Austria (Austria-Hungary). He grew up as a performer, latterly a trapeze artist, in a travelling circus. After training as a metal worker, he re-joined the circus as an animal trainer and lion tamer, in which capacity he traveled the world. In 1901 he visited the United States, and stayed there in order to work as a manager of an animal business.

After visiting several shows of the new medium of film and becoming interested in it, Delmont started to make his own films in 1903 for the film production company Vitagraph. These were short Westerns, one-act movies or one-reelers lasting only a few minutes. In 1905 he made his first two-act movie.

During 1910 he returned to Vienna, where among other things he worked for the Österreichisch-Ungarische Kinoindustrie (later Wiener-Kunstfilm) as a cameraman, and was thus cameraman, and also technical director and director of scenery, on the oldest Austrian drama film to survive in its entirety: Der Müller und sein Kind of 1911. Soon afterwards, he went to Germany. In Berlin, he directed in several studios, among them the Rex-Ateliers, sometimes working as co-director with Harry Piel, and sometimes acting with Fred Sauer, Curt Bois and Ilse Bois on a series of adventurous, action-packed, dramatic fantasy films. The sensational part of these films was that, for the first time, extraordinary film footage of beasts of prey was shown and for which his films were well known.

Later on, Delmont collaborated with film producer Max Nivelli in the making of several films of social and political nature, which made headlines in major newspapers of the Weimar Republic era. In 1919 he directed the film The Outcasts also known as The Ritual Murder (German: Die Geächteten / Der Ritualmord) which was aimed at educating the public on the dangers of antisemitism. The movie tried to address the growing concern by the German public of the flood of Jewish immigrants arriving from Eastern Europe.

Another socially important film directed by Delmont in 1920, for which he also wrote the screenplay, was Humanity Unleashed (German: Die entfesselte Menschheit). The film was based on the novel by the same name written by Max Glass and was considered as one of the anti-Bolshevik films of that era. The story, although fictional, described an event very similar to the "Spartacist uprising" which occurred only the year before. Large parts of this film were used in 1926 by Delmont in the film Unity, Justice and Freedom (German: Einigkeit und Recht und Freiheit).

For the making of his movies Delmont traveled to Panama, Portugal, England, France, Spain and the Netherlands.

His last project as a director was in the film Der Millionenraub im Rivieraexpreß (1927). From then on, he devoted himself to writing, something he had dabbled in since 1892. By the time of his death in 1935 he had written several novels and short stories, and many newspaper articles. Besides detective stories and non-fiction work about his experiences with animals, he also wrote adventure and crime novels. With "Der Ritt auf dem Funken" (1928) he published a futuristic science fiction novel about the possibility of travelling with vehicles on electric currents in the near future.

Delmont died in 1935 in Piešťany, Czechoslovakia (now Slovakia).

== Filmography ==
The following is a selected list of films, both short and long, directed by Delmont. In many he also wrote the screenplay or appeared as an actor.

- Der Müller und sein Kind (I), 1910 (Germany; screenplay only)
- Der Müller und sein Kind (II), 1911 (Austria; camera and technical direction)
- Der Streikbrecher, 1911 (Germany)
- Mutter und Sohn, 1911 (Germany)
- Verirrte Seelen, 1911 (Germany)
- Das sechste Gebot, 1912 (Germany)
- Der Fremde, 1912 (Germany)
- Die Puppe, 1912 (Germany)
- Schuld und Sühne, 1912 (Germany; screenplay)
- Der wilde Jäger, 1912 (Germany; screenplay)
- Dichterlos, 1912 (Germany)
- Das Sterben im Walde, 1912 (Germany; screenplay, actor)
- Das Recht aufs Dasein, 1913 (Germany; crime film; actor with, among others, Ilse Bois; 880 metres)
- Der letzte Akkord, 1913 (Germany; screenplay)
- Das rote Pulver, 1913 (Germany; screenplay)
- Das Tagebuch eines Toten, 1913 (Germany)
- Auf einsamer Insel, 1913 (Germany; screenplay, actor)
- Der geheimnisvolle Klub, 1913 (Germany; actor with, among others, Ilse Bois, Fred Sauer; 851 metres)
- Der Desperado von Panama, 1914 (Germany; actor)
- Ein Erbe wird gesucht, 1915 (Germany)
- Ein ungeschriebenes Blatt, 1915 (Germany; screenplay)
- Der Silbertunnel, 1915 (Germany)
- Titanenkampf, 1916 (Germany; screenplay)
- Theophrastus Paracelsus, 1916 (Germany; screenplay)
- Die Töchter des Eichmeisters, 1916 (Germany; screenplay)
- Das Geheimnis des Waldes, 1917 (Austria 1917; co-director with Hans Otto Löwenstein, screenplay)
- Die Geächteten, also known as: Der Ritualmord, 1919 (Germany; Director)
- Der Bastard, 1919 (Germany; screenplay)
- Margot de Plaisance, 1919 (Germany; screenplay)
- Battle of the Sexes, 1920 (Germany; screenplay)
- Humanity Unleashed, 1920 (Germany; Director, screenplay)
- Die Insel der Gezeichneten, 1920 (Germany)
- Madame Récamier/ Des Großen Talma letzte Liebe, 1920 (Germany)
- Der König der Manege, 1921 (Germany; co-author of screenplay, Schauspiel)
- Die eiserne Faust, 1921 (Germany)
- Julot, der Apache, 1921 (Germany; screenplay)
- The Man of Steel (1922) (Germany)
- The Maharaja's Victory (1923) (Germany)
- Marco unter Gauklern und Bestien, 1923 (Germany)
- Mater Dolorosa, 1924 (Germany)
- Around a Million (1924) (Germany; co-director, screenplay)
- Einigkeit und Recht und Freiheit, 1926 (Germany; Director)
- Der Millionenraub im Rivieraexpreß, 1925-27 (Germany/France 1925–1927)

== Literary works ==
The German National Library knows of 15 novels and 11 other works by Joseph Delmont, of which the following are a selection:

- Wilde Tiere im Film: Erlebnisse aus meinen Filmaufnahmen in aller Welt. Dieck, Stuttgart 1925 (non-fictional account of his experiences with animals; went through 14 editions)
- Die Stadt unter dem Meere. Leipzig 1925 (novel)
- In Ketten. Fr. Wilh. Grunow, Leipzig 1926 (reprinted several times in the following years under the title Juden in Ketten)
- Von lustigen Tieren und dummen Menschen: Eine Melange. Neue Berliner Verlags-GmbH, Berlin 1927
- Abenteuer mit wilden Tieren: Erlebnisse e. Raubtierfängers Enßlin & Laiblin, Reutlingen 1927 (part of the collection "Aus weiter Welt")
- Der Gefangene der Wüste Neufeld & Henius, Berlin 1927
- Die Sieben Häuser: Wanderfahrten e. Lausbuben. Grethlein & Co., Leipzig 1927
- Der Ritt auf dem Funken: Phantastischer Zukunftsroman. O. Janke, Berlin 1928
- Der Casanova von Bautzen. Leipzig 1931; new edition Lusatia-Verlag, Bautzen 2005
- Die Abenteuer des Johnny Kilburn. F. W. Grunow, Leipzig 1934
