= Carlo Aldini =

Italian actor and film producer

- Born: 6 May 1894; Pieve Fosciana, Tuscany, Italy
- Died: 21 March 1961 (aged 66); Bologna, Emilia-Romagna, Italy
- Occupations: Actor, Producer
- Years active: 1920–1934 (film)

Carlo Aldini (1894–1961) was an Italian actor and film producer.

== Selected filmography ==
Year	Title	Role	Notes
1924	Helena	Achille	
1924	The Third Watch	Alf Julsrud	
1929	The Last Testament	Boxer Frank Ward	

== Bibliography ==
- Haining, Peter. Agatha Christie: Murder in four acts : a centenary celebration of 'The Queen of Crime' on stage, films, radio & TV. Virgin, 1990.
