= Alfred Haase =

German actor

Alfred Haase (29 November 1887 – 14 December 1960) was a German actor.

Haase was born and died in Berlin at age 73.

== Selected filmography ==
- Temperamental Artist (1920)
- A Woman's Revenge (1921)
- Julot der Apache (1921)
- The Devil's Chains (1921)
- The Amazon (1921)
- Die fünf Frankfurter (1922)
- Sins of Yesterday (1922)
- The Beautiful Girl (1923)
- Claire (1924)
- The Good Reputation (1926)
- Impossible Love (1932)
- Miss Madame (1934)
- The Big Chance (1934)
- Verlieb Dich nicht am Bodensee (1935)
- Manege (1937)
- His Best Friend (1937)
- The Muzzle (1938)
- Heimatland (1939)
- We Danced Around the World (1939)
- Brand im Ozean (1939)
- Commissioner Eyck (1940)

== Bibliography ==
- Jung, Uli & Schatzberg, Walter. Beyond Caligari: The Films of Robert Wiene. Berghahn Books, 1999.
