= Linda Albertini =

Italian silent film actress

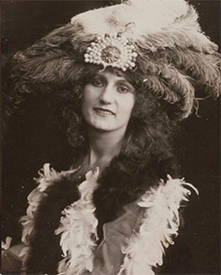
- Born: 13 April 1894
- Occupation: Actress

Linda Albertini (13 April 1894?) was an Italian silent film actress. She starred in adventure films and was originally a circus acrobat. She is noted for playing a newly emerging female role during and after the First World War, which had been characterised as a strong, dauntless, and athletic woman.

Albertini was the wife of Luciano Albertini, an Italian actor, who also founded his own film company.

== Career ==
After World War I, Italian women had more freedom, and strong women were featured in popular culture, such as films. This new female form in film is said to have originated from the "popular adventure and romance stories in feuilleton and comic strips." Albertini was the first Italian woman to portray that type of character in films, drawing on her experience as a circus acrobat and using the character name Sansonette for films. She starred in the 1917 adventure film La spirale della morte (The Spiral of Death), alongside her husband Luciano Albertini, as an acrobat who assists a lieutenant in the navy. Due to the film's success, they were able to star in multiple films, and Luciano was able to start his own film company. Albertini was the main star of her husband's films, and she enthusiastically used her talent as a trapeze artist in her roles. She was known for acrobatics in the air with a trapeze, ropes, horses, and flying vehicles. In 1920, she starred in The Monster of Frankenstein together with Albertini and Umberto Guarracino.

Sansonette e i quattro arlecchini (Sansonette and the Four Harlequins), was her last Italian film, due to audiences becoming tired of the unrealistic and outlandish adventure films. Albertini and her husband moved to Germany, and she starred in four films there until she was replaced by her husband with another woman. Her film career was longer than many similar actresses.

Angela Dalle Vacche wrote in her book Diva: Defiance and Passion in Early Italian Cinema that "Albertini was an Amazon of the air and a dancer of the prairie". Frank Burke referred to Albertini as a noteworthy example of the adventurous diva archetype in the book A Companion to Italian Cinema.
