= Boris Johnson =

Prime Minister of the United Kingdom from 2019 to 2022

The Right Honourable Boris Johnson Hon FRIBA
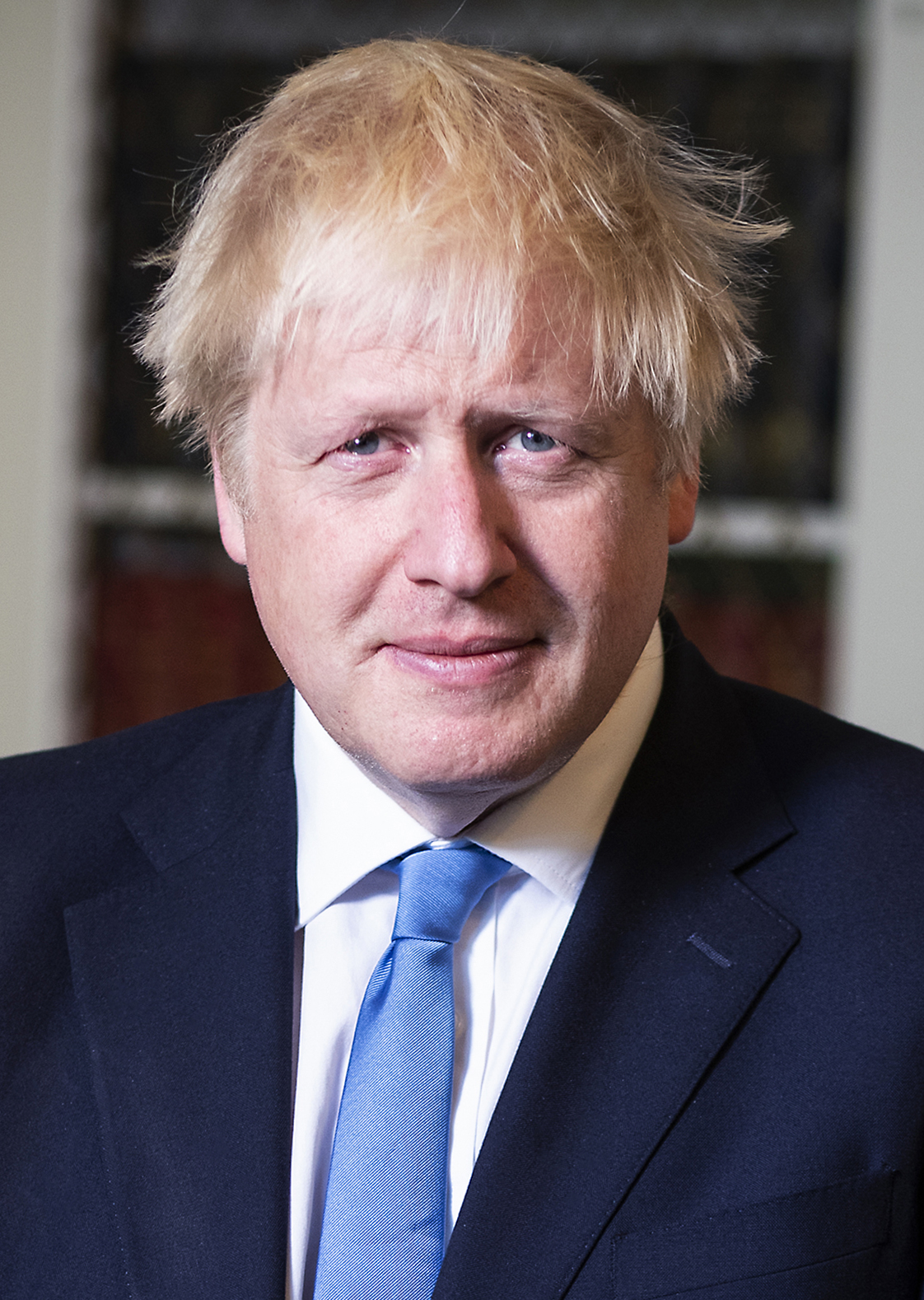
- Official portrait, 2019

Prime Minister of the United Kingdom
- In office 24 July 2019 – 6 September 2022
- Monarch: Elizabeth II
- Deputy: Dominic Raab (Note: Raab deputised for Johnson as First Secretary of State until September 2021, then as Deputy Prime Minister.)
- Preceded by: Theresa May
- Succeeded by: Liz Truss

Leader of the Conservative Party
- In office 23 July 2019 – 5 September 2022
- Preceded by: Theresa May
- Succeeded by: Liz Truss

Secretary of State for Foreign and Commonwealth Affairs
- In office 13 July 2016 – 9 July 2018
- Prime Minister: Theresa May
- Preceded by: Philip Hammond
- Succeeded by: Jeremy Hunt

Mayor of London
- In office 3 May 2008 – 9 May 2016
- Deputy: Richard Barnes; Victoria Borwick; Roger Evans
- Preceded by: Ken Livingstone
- Succeeded by: Sadiq Khan

Member of Parliament
- In office 7 May 2015 – 12 June 2023
- Preceded by: John Randall
- Succeeded by: Steve Tuckwell
- Constituency: Uxbridge and South Ruislip
- In office 7 June 2001 – 4 June 2008
- Preceded by: Michael Heseltine
- Succeeded by: John Howell
- Constituency: Henley

Shadow Cabinet portfolios
- 2004: Arts
- 2005–2007: Higher Education

Personal details
- Born: Alexander Boris de Pfeffel Johnson; 19 June 1964 (age 62) New York City, US
- Citizenship: United Kingdom; United States (until 2016)
- Party: Conservative
- Spouses: Allegra Mostyn-Owen (1987–1993) Marina Wheeler (m. 1993; div. 2020) Carrie Symonds (m. 2021)
- Parents: Stanley Johnson; Charlotte Fawcett
- Relatives: Johnson family
- Education: Balliol College, Oxford (BA)
- Occupation: Politician; author; journalist
- Website: boris-johnson.com
- Boris Johnson's voice Johnson's address to the nation on its departure from the European Union; Recorded 31 January 2020

Alexander Boris de Pfeffel Johnson (born 19 June 1964) is a British politician and writer who was Prime Minister of the United Kingdom and Leader of the Conservative Party from 2019 to 2022. He was previously Foreign Secretary from 2016 to 2018 and Mayor of London from 2008 to 2016. He was Member of Parliament (MP) for Henley from 2001 to 2008 and for Uxbridge and South Ruislip from 2015 to 2023.

In his youth Johnson attended Eton College and Balliol College, Oxford, and he was elected president of the Oxford Union in 1986. In 1989 he began writing for The Daily Telegraph, and from 1999 to 2005 he was the editor of The Spectator. He became a member of the Shadow Cabinet of Michael Howard in 2001 before being dismissed over a claim that he had lied about an extramarital affair. After Howard resigned, Johnson became a member of David Cameron's Shadow Cabinet. He was elected mayor of London in 2008 and resigned from the House of Commons to focus his attention on the mayoralty. He was re-elected mayor in 2012, but did not run for re-election in 2016. At the 2015 general election he was elected MP for Uxbridge and South Ruislip. Johnson was a prominent figure in the Brexit campaign in the 2016 EU membership referendum. After the referendum, Prime Minister Theresa May appointed him foreign secretary. He resigned from the position in 2018 in protest at both the Chequers Agreement and May's approach to Brexit.

Johnson succeeded May as prime minister upon winning the 2019 leadership election triggered by May's resignation. During his premiership, Johnson re-opened Brexit negotiations with the EU and in early September he prorogued Parliament; the Supreme Court later ruled the prorogation to have been unlawful. After agreeing to a revised Brexit withdrawal agreement but failing to win parliamentary support, Johnson called a snap general election to be held in December 2019, in which he won a landslide victory. The UK officially left the EU in January 2020. Johnson's government responded to the COVID-19 pandemic by introducing various emergency powers to mitigate its impact and approved a nationwide vaccination programme, which was one of the fastest in the world. He also responded to the Russian invasion of Ukraine by imposing sanctions on Russia and authorising foreign aid and weapons shipments to Ukraine.

In the Partygate scandal, it was found that numerous gatherings had been held at 10 Downing Street during national COVID-19 lockdowns, and COVID-19 social distancing laws were breached by 83 individuals, including Johnson, who in April 2022 was issued with a fixed penalty notice. The publishing of the Sue Gray report in May 2022 and a widespread sense of dissatisfaction led in June 2022 to a vote of confidence in his leadership amongst Conservative MPs, which he won. In July 2022, revelations over his appointment of Chris Pincher as Deputy Chief Whip of the party while knowing of allegations of sexual misconduct against him led to a mass resignation of members of his government and to Johnson announcing his resignation as prime minister. He was succeeded as prime minister by Liz Truss, his foreign secretary. He remained in the House of Commons as a backbencher until June 2023, when he received the draft of the Commons Privileges Committee investigation into his conduct that unanimously found that he had lied to the Commons on numerous occasions. Johnson resigned his position as MP the same day.

Johnson is a controversial figure in British politics. During his premiership, his supporters lauded him for "getting Brexit done", overseeing the UK's COVID-19 vaccination programme, which was amongst the fastest in the world, and being one of the first world leaders to offer humanitarian and military support to Ukraine, following the Russian invasion of the country. Johnson's supporters have also praised him for being witty and entertaining, with an electoral appeal that reaches beyond traditional Conservative Party voters. Conversely, critics have accused him of dishonesty, elitism, cronyism and bigotry.

== Early life and education ==
=== Childhood ===
Alexander Boris de Pfeffel Johnson was born on 19 June 1964 on the Upper East Side of Manhattan, New York City, to Stanley Johnson, then studying economics at Columbia University, and Charlotte Fawcett, an artist, whose father Sir James Fawcett, was a prominent barrister and president of the European Commission of Human Rights from 1972 to 1981. Johnson was a US citizen by virtue of his birth in the US, though he would later renounce his American citizenship. Johnson's parents returned to the UK in September 1964 so Charlotte could study at the University of Oxford. She lived with her son in Summertown, Oxford, and in September 1965 she gave birth to a daughter, Rachel. In July 1965, the family moved to Crouch End in north London, and in February 1966 they relocated to Washington, DC, where Stanley worked with the World Bank. Stanley then took a job with a policy panel on population control, and moved the family to Norwalk, Connecticut, in June. A third child, Leo, was born in September 1967.

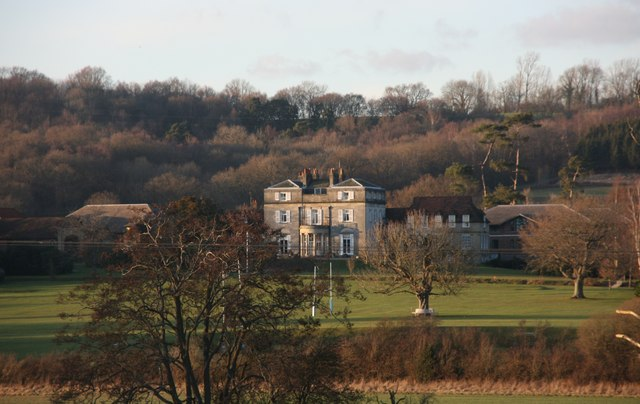
Ashdown House preparatory school, East Sussex, attended by Johnson from 1975 to 1977

The family returned to the UK in 1969, and lived at West Nethercote Farm in Winsford, Somerset, Stanley's family home in Exmoor. His father was regularly absent, leaving Johnson to be raised largely by his mother, assisted by au pairs. As a child, Johnson was quiet, studious, and deaf, resulting in several operations to insert grommets into his ears. He and his siblings were encouraged to engage in intellectual activities from a young age. Johnson's earliest recorded ambition was to be "world king". Having no other friends, the siblings became very close.

In late 1969, the family moved to Maida Vale in west London, while Stanley began post-graduate research at the London School of Economics. In 1970 Charlotte and the children briefly returned to Nethercote, where Johnson attended Winsford Village School, before returning to London to settle in Primrose Hill, where they were educated at Primrose Hill Primary School. A fourth child, Joseph, was born in late 1971.

After Stanley secured employment at the European Commission in April 1973, he moved his family to Uccle, Brussels, where Johnson attended the European School, Brussels I, and learnt to speak French. Charlotte had a nervous breakdown and was hospitalised with depression, after which Johnson and his siblings were sent back to the UK in 1975 to attend Ashdown House, a preparatory boarding school in East Sussex. There, he developed interests in rugby, Ancient Greek, and Latin. In December 1978 his parents' relationship broke down; they divorced in 1980, and Charlotte moved to Notting Hill, London, where her children joined her for much of their time.

=== Eton and Oxford: 1977–1987 ===
As a kid I was extremely spotty, extremely nerdy and horribly swotty. My idea of a really good time was to travel across London on the tube to visit the British Museum.

— Boris Johnson

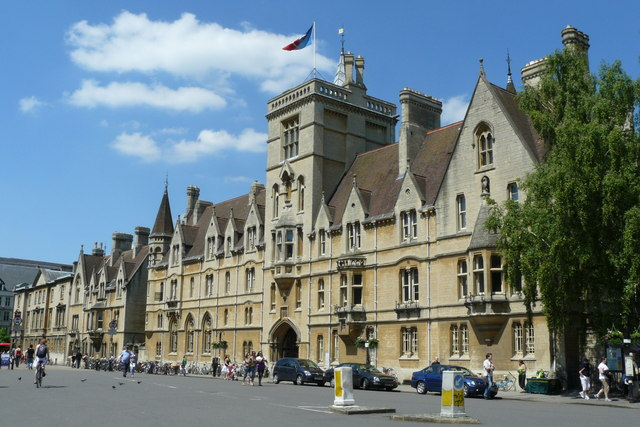
Johnson studied classics at Balliol College, Oxford.

Johnson gained a King's Scholarship to study at Eton College, a boarding school near Windsor, Berkshire. Arriving in the autumn term of 1977, he began going by his middle name Boris, and developed "the eccentric English persona" for which he became famous. He denounced Catholicism and joined the Church of England. School reports complained about his idleness, complacency, and lateness, but he was popular at Eton.

Johnson's friends were largely from the wealthy upper classes; his best friends were Darius Guppy and Charles Spencer. Both would go on to accompany him at the University of Oxford and remained his friends into adulthood. Johnson excelled in English and the Classics, winning prizes in both, and became secretary of the school debating society and editor of the school newspaper. In late 1981 he became a member of Pop, a small, self-selecting elite group of school prefects. After leaving Eton, Johnson went on a gap year to Australia, where he taught English and Latin at Timbertop, an Outward Bound-inspired campus of Geelong Grammar, an independent boarding school.

Johnson won a scholarship to read Literae humaniores at Balliol College, Oxford, a four-year course in Classics, ancient languages, literature, history, and philosophy. Matriculating in late 1983, he was one of a generation of Oxford undergraduates who dominated British politics and media in the early 21st century, including Cameron, William Hague, Michael Gove, Jeremy Hunt and Nick Boles. While at Oxford, Johnson joined the college's rugby union team as a tighthead prop. To his later regret, he joined the Bullingdon Club, an exclusive drinking society notorious for vandalism. Many years later, a group photograph including himself and Cameron in Bullingdon Club formal dress led to much negative press coverage. While at Oxford, he began a relationship with Allegra Mostyn-Owen, cover girl for Tatler magazine and daughter of Christie's Education chairman William Mostyn-Owen. They became engaged.

In the summer of 1984 Boris Johnson and his sister Rachel volunteered at Kibbutz Kfar HaNassi in northern Israel, where they stayed with an Israeli family originally from Leeds.

Johnson was popular and well known at Oxford. Alongside Guppy, he edited the university's satirical magazine Tributary. In 1984, Johnson was elected secretary of the Oxford Union, and campaigned unsuccessfully for the position of Union President. In 1986, Johnson ran successfully for president, but his term was not distinguished or memorable, and questions were raised regarding his competence and seriousness. At graduation, Johnson was awarded an upper second-class degree, and was deeply unhappy he did not receive a first.

== Early career ==
=== The Times and The Daily Telegraph: 1987–1994 ===
In September 1987, Johnson and Mostyn-Owen married. They settled in West Kensington, London. In late 1987, through family connections, he began work as a graduate trainee at The Times. Scandal erupted when Johnson wrote an article for the newspaper on the archaeological discovery of Edward II's palace, having invented a quote which he falsely attributed to the historian Colin Lucas, his godfather. After the paper's editor, Charles Wilson, learnt of the matter, he dismissed Johnson.

Johnson secured employment on the lead-writing desk of The Daily Telegraph, having met its editor, Max Hastings, while at university. His articles appealed to the newspaper's Conservative-voting "Middle England" readership, and he was known for his distinctive literary style, replete with old-fashioned phrasing and for regularly referring to the readership as "my friends". In early 1989, Johnson was appointed to the newspaper's Brussels bureau to report on the European Commission, remaining in the post until 1994. A strong critic of the integrationist Commission president Jacques Delors, he established himself as one of the city's few Eurosceptic journalists. He wrote articles about euromyths: that Brussels had recruited sniffer dogs to ensure that all manure smelt the same, they were about to dictate the acceptable curve of British bananas, (Note: Commission Regulation (EC) No. 2257/94 introduced the requirement for bananas to be "free from malformation or abnormal curvature"; different standards applied to different classes of banana.) limit the power of their vacuum cleaners (Note: The EU introduced limits on the power of vacuum cleaners in 2014.) and order women to return their old sex toys. He wrote that euro notes made people impotent and that a plan to blow up the Berlaymont building was in place because asbestos cladding made the building too dangerous to inhabit. Many of his fellow journalists were critical of his articles, saying they often contained lies designed to discredit the commission. The Europhile Conservative politician Chris Patten later said that Johnson was "one of the greatest exponents of fake journalism". Johnson opposed banning handguns after the Dunblane school massacre, writing in his column "Nanny is confiscating their toys. It is like one of those vast Indian programmes of compulsory vasectomy."

According to Sonia Purnell, one of Johnson's biographers and his Brussels deputy, he helped make Euroscepticism "an attractive and emotionally resonant cause for the Right", whereas it had been associated previously with the Left. Johnson's articles exacerbated tensions between the Conservative Party's Eurosceptic and Europhile factions. As a result, he earned the mistrust of many party members. His writings were also a key influence on the emergence of the eurosceptic UK Independence Party (UKIP) in the early 1990s. Conrad Black, then proprietor of The Daily Telegraph, said Johnson "was such an effective correspondent for us in Brussels that he greatly influenced British opinion on this country's relations with Europe".

In February 1990 Johnson's wife Allegra broke up with him; after several attempts at reconciliation, their marriage ended in April 1993. He began a relationship with childhood friend Marina Wheeler, who had moved to Brussels in 1990. They were married in May 1993. Soon after, Marina gave birth to a daughter. Johnson and his new wife settled in Islington, north London, an area known for its association with the left-liberal intelligentsia. Under the influence of this milieu and of his wife, Johnson moved in a more liberal direction on issues such as climate change, LGBT rights and race relations. While in Islington, the couple had three more children, all given the surname Johnson-Wheeler. They were sent to the local Canonbury Primary School and then to private secondary schools. Devoting much time to his children, Johnson wrote a book of verse, The Perils of the Pushy Parents: A Cautionary Tale, which was published to largely poor reviews.

=== Political columnist: 1994–1999 ===
Back in London, Hastings turned down Johnson's request to become a war reporter, instead promoting him to assistant editor and chief political columnist. Johnson's column received praise for being ideologically eclectic and distinctively written, and earned him Commentator of the Year Award at the What the Papers Say awards. Some critics condemned his writing style as bigotry; in columns he used the words "piccaninnies" and "watermelon smiles" when referring to Africans, championed European colonialism in Uganda and referred to gay men as "tank-topped bumboys".

In 1993, Johnson outlined his desire to run as a Conservative in the 1994 European Parliament elections. Andrew Mitchell convinced Major not to veto Johnson's candidacy, but Johnson could not find a constituency. He turned his attention to obtaining a seat in the House of Commons instead. After being rejected as Conservative candidate for Holborn and St. Pancras, he was selected the Conservative candidate for Clwyd South in north Wales, then a Labour Party safe seat. Spending six weeks campaigning, he attained 9,091 votes (23 per cent) in the 1997 general election, losing to Labour candidate Martyn Jones.

Scandal erupted in June 1995 when a recording of a 1990 telephone conversation between Johnson and his friend Darius Guppy was made public. In it, Guppy said that his criminal activities involving insurance fraud were being investigated by News of the World journalist Stuart Collier, and he asked Johnson to provide him with Collier's private address, seeking to have the latter beaten. Johnson agreed, although he expressed concern that he would be associated with the attack. When the phone conversation was published, Johnson stated that ultimately he had not obliged Guppy's request. Hastings reprimanded Johnson but did not dismiss him.

Johnson was given a regular column in The Spectator, sister publication to The Daily Telegraph, which attracted mixed reviews and was often thought rushed. In 1999, he was also given a column reviewing new cars in the American men's monthly magazine GQ. The large number of parking fines that Johnson acquired while testing cars frustrated staff. At The Daily Telegraph and The Spectator, he was consistently late delivering copy, forcing staff to stay late to accommodate him; some related that if they published without his work, he would shout at them with expletives.

Johnson's April 1998 appearance on the BBC's satirical current affairs show Have I Got News for You brought him national fame. He was invited back on to later episodes, including as a guest presenter; for his 2003 appearance, Johnson was nominated for the BAFTA Television Award for Best Entertainment Performance. After these appearances, he came to be recognised on the street, and was invited to appear on other shows, such as Top Gear, Parkinson, Breakfast with Frost, and Question Time.

=== The Spectator and MP for Henley: 1999–2008 ===
In July 1999, Conrad Black offered Johnson the editorship of The Spectator on the condition he abandon his parliamentary aspirations; Johnson agreed. While retaining The Spectator's traditional right-wing bent, Johnson welcomed contributions from leftist writers and cartoonists. Under Johnson's editorship, the magazine's circulation grew by 10% to 62,000 and it became profitable. His editorship also drew criticism; some opined that under him The Spectator avoided serious issues, while colleagues became annoyed that he was regularly absent from the office, meetings, and events. He gained a reputation as a poor political pundit because of incorrect political predictions. His father-in-law Charles Wheeler and others strongly criticised him for allowing Spectator columnist Taki Theodoracopulos to publish racist and antisemitic language. Journalist Charlotte Edwardes wrote in The Times in 2019 that Johnson had squeezed her thigh at a private lunch at the Spectator in 1999 and that another woman had told her he had done the same to her. A spokesman denied the allegation.

In 2003, Johnson alongside Nicholas Burgess Farrell had a three-hour interview with then Italian Prime Minister Silvio Berlusconi in his private palace in Sardinia. When excerpts were published in The Spectator and Italian newspapers, they caused a controversy that almost led to an institutional crisis due to Berlusconi's controversial statements about among others Benito Mussolini and the Italian judiciary. In 2004, Johnson published an editorial in The Spectator after the murder of Ken Bigley suggesting that Liverpudlians were wallowing in their victim status and "hooked on grief" over the Hillsborough disaster, which Johnson partly blamed on "drunken fans". In an appendix added to a later edition of his 2005 book The Dream of Rome, Tell MAMA and the Muslim Council of Britain criticised Johnson for arguing Islam has caused the Muslim world to be "literally centuries behind" the West.

==== Becoming an MP ====
The selection of Boris Johnson ... confirms the Tory Party's increasing weakness for celebrity personalities over the dreary exigencies of politics. Johnson, for all his gifts, is unlikely to grace any future Tory cabinet. Indeed, he is not known for his excessive interest in serious policy matters, and it is hard to see him grubbing away at administrative detail as an obscure, hardworking junior minister for social security. To maintain his funny man reputation he will no doubt find himself refining his Bertie Wooster interpretation to the point where the impersonation becomes the man.

— Max Hastings, London Evening Standard,

Following Michael Heseltine's retirement, Johnson decided to stand as Conservative candidate for Henley, a Conservative safe seat in Oxfordshire. The local Conservative branch selected him although it was split over Johnson's candidacy. Some thought him amusing and charming while others disliked his flippant attitude and perceived lack of knowledge of the local area. Assisted by his television fame, Johnson won the seat in the 2001 general election. Alongside his Islington home, Johnson bought a farmhouse outside Thame in his new constituency. He regularly attended Henley social events and occasionally wrote for the Henley Standard. His constituency surgeries proved popular, and he joined local campaigns to stop the closure of Townlands Hospital and the local air ambulance.

In Parliament, Johnson was appointed to a standing committee assessing the Proceeds of Crime Bill, but missed many of its meetings. Despite his credentials as a public speaker, his speeches in the House of Commons were widely deemed lacklustre. He attended around half of Commons votes, usually supporting the Conservative party line. In free votes, he demonstrated a more socially liberal attitude, supporting the Gender Recognition Act 2004 and the repeal of Section 28. In 2001 Johnson had spoken out against plans to repeal Section 28, saying it was "Labour's appalling agenda, encouraging the teaching of homosexuality in schools". After initially stating he would not, he supported the government's plans to join the United States in the 2003 invasion of Iraq, and in April 2003 visited occupied Baghdad. In August 2004, he backed unsuccessful impeachment procedures against Prime Minister Tony Blair for "high crimes and misdemeanours" regarding the war, and in December 2006 described the invasion as "a colossal mistake and misadventure".

Although labelling Johnson "ineffably duplicitous" for breaking his promise not to become an MP, Black decided not to dismiss him because he "helped promote the magazine and raise its circulation". Johnson remained editor of The Spectator, while also writing columns for The Daily Telegraph and GQ, and making television appearances. His 2001 book, Friends, Voters, Countrymen: Jottings on the Stump, recounted that year's election campaign, while 2003's Lend Me Your Ears collected previously published columns and articles. In 2004, HarperCollins published his first novel: Seventy-Two Virgins: A Comedy of Errors revolved around the life of a Conservative MP and contained autobiographical elements. Responding to criticism that he was juggling too many jobs, he cited Winston Churchill and Benjamin Disraeli as exemplars who combined political and literary careers. To manage stress, he took up jogging and cycling, and became so well known for the latter that Andrew Gimson suggested he was "perhaps the most famous cyclist in Britain".

Following William Hague's resignation as Conservative leader, the party elected Iain Duncan Smith. Johnson had a strained relationship with Duncan Smith, and The Spectator became critical of his party leadership. Duncan Smith was succeeded by Michael Howard in November 2003; Howard deemed Johnson to be the most popular Conservative politician with the electorate and appointed him vice-chairman of the party, responsible for overseeing its electoral campaign. In his Shadow Cabinet reshuffle of May 2004, Howard appointed Johnson as shadow arts minister. In October, Howard ordered Johnson to apologise publicly in Liverpool for publishing a Spectator article – anonymously written by Simon Heffer – which said the crowds at the Hillsborough disaster had contributed to the incident and that Liverpudlians had a predilection for reliance on the welfare state.

In November 2004, the tabloids revealed that since 2000 Johnson had been having an affair with Spectator columnist Petronella Wyatt, resulting in two abortions. Johnson denied the allegations but they were subsequently proven to be true, and Howard dismissed him as vice-chairman and shadow arts minister when he refused to resign.

==== Second term ====
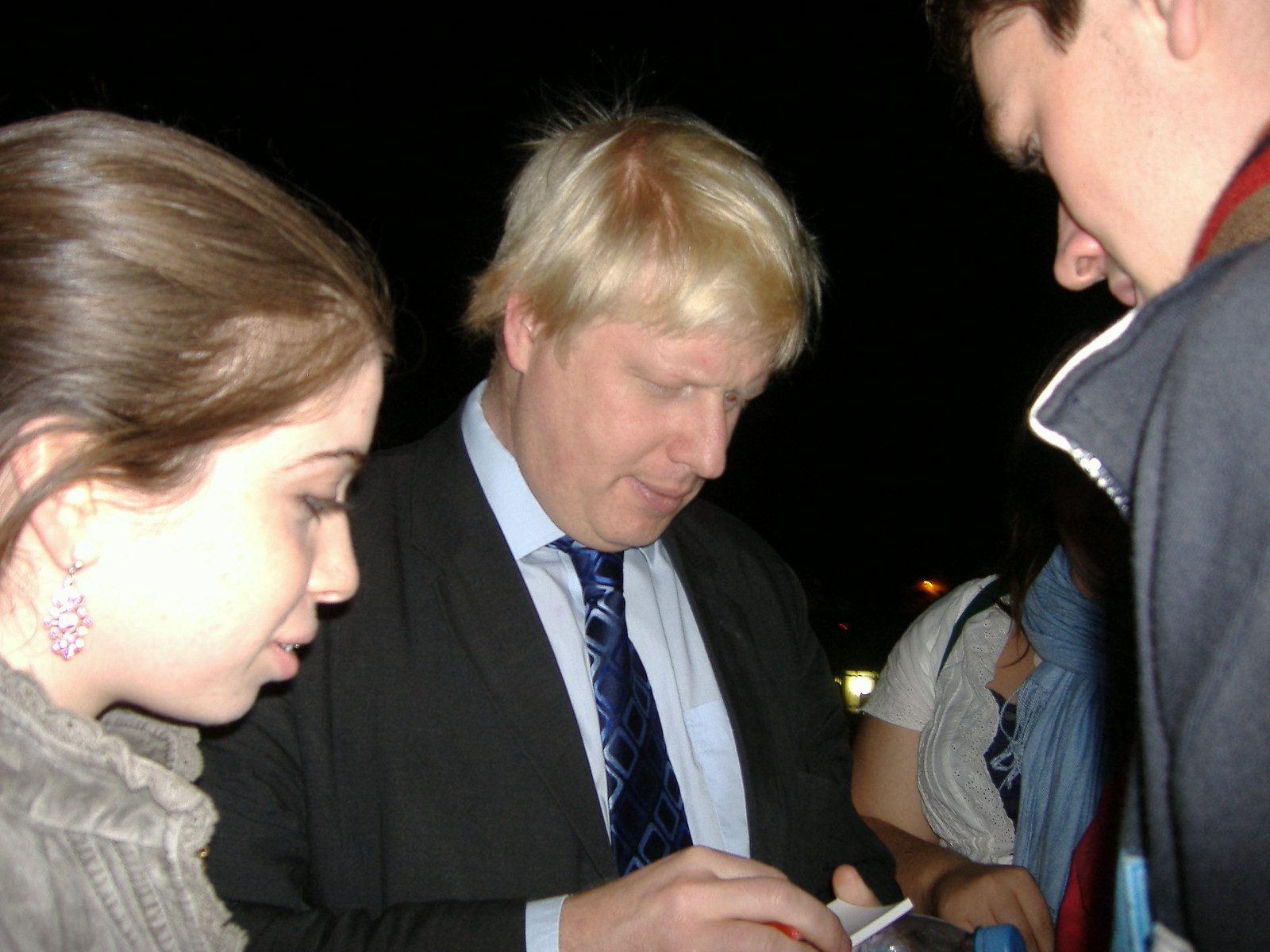
As shadow minister for higher education, Johnson visited various universities (as here at the University of Nottingham in 2006).

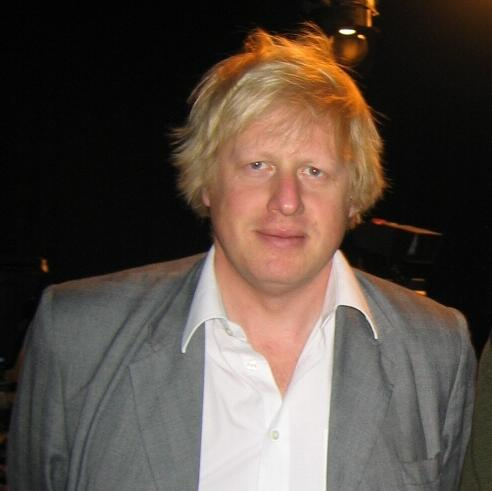
Johnson in 2007

At the 2005 general election, Johnson was re-elected MP for Henley. Labour won the election and Howard stood down as Conservative leader; Johnson backed David Cameron as his successor. After Cameron was elected, he appointed Johnson as the shadow higher education minister. Interested in streamlining university funding, Johnson supported Labour's proposed top-up fees. He campaigned in 2006 to become the Rector of the University of Edinburgh, but his support for top-up fees damaged his campaign, and he came third.

In April 2006, the News of the World alleged that Johnson was having an affair with journalist Anna Fazackerley; the pair did not comment, and shortly afterwards Johnson began employing Fazackerley. In September 2006, Papua New Guinea's High Commission protested after he compared the Conservatives' frequently changing leadership to cannibalism in the country.

In 2005, The Spectator's new chief executive, Andrew Neil, dismissed Johnson as editor. To make up for this loss of income, Johnson negotiated with The Daily Telegraph to raise his salary from £200,000 to £250,000, averaging £5,000 per column. He presented a popular history television show, The Dream of Rome, which was broadcast in January 2006; a book followed in February. A sequel, After Rome, focused on early Islamic history. In 2007 he earned £540,000, making him the third-highest-earning MP that year.

== Mayor of London (2008–2016) ==
=== Mayoral election: 2007–2008 ===
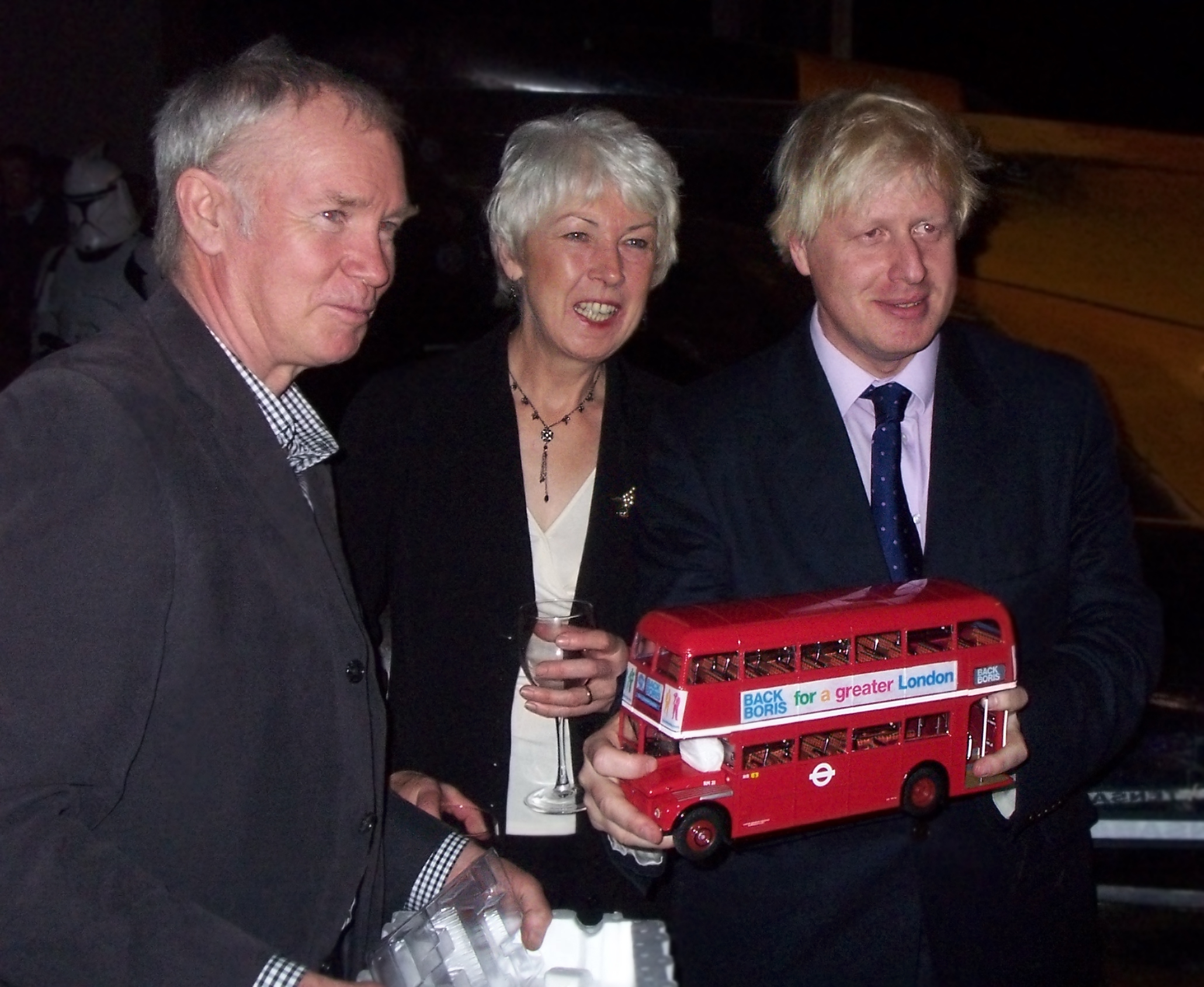
Johnson pledged to replace the city's articulated buses with New Routemaster buses if elected mayor.

In September, Johnson was selected as the Conservative candidate for Mayor of London after a public London-wide primary. Johnson's campaign focused on reducing youth crime, making public transport safer, and replacing the articulated buses with an updated version of the double-decker AEC Routemaster. Targeting the Conservative-leaning suburbs of outer London, it capitalised on perceptions that the Labour Mayoralty had neglected them in favour of inner London. His campaign emphasised his popularity, even among those who opposed his policies, with opponents complaining a common attitude among voters was: "I'm voting for Boris because he is a laugh." The campaign of Labour incumbent Ken Livingstone portrayed Johnson as an out-of-touch toff and bigot.

In the election, Johnson received 43% and Livingstone 37% of first-preference votes; when second-preference votes were added, Johnson was victorious with 53% to Livingstone's 47%. Johnson subsequently announced his intention to stand down as MP for Henley.

=== First term: 2008–2012 ===
After Johnson became mayor, those in City Hall deemed too closely allied to Livingstone's administration had their employment terminated. Johnson appointed Tim Parker as his deputy mayor, but after Parker began taking increasing control at City Hall, Johnson dismissed him. Many in the Conservative Party initially distanced themselves from Johnson's administration, fearing it would be damaging for the 2010 general election.

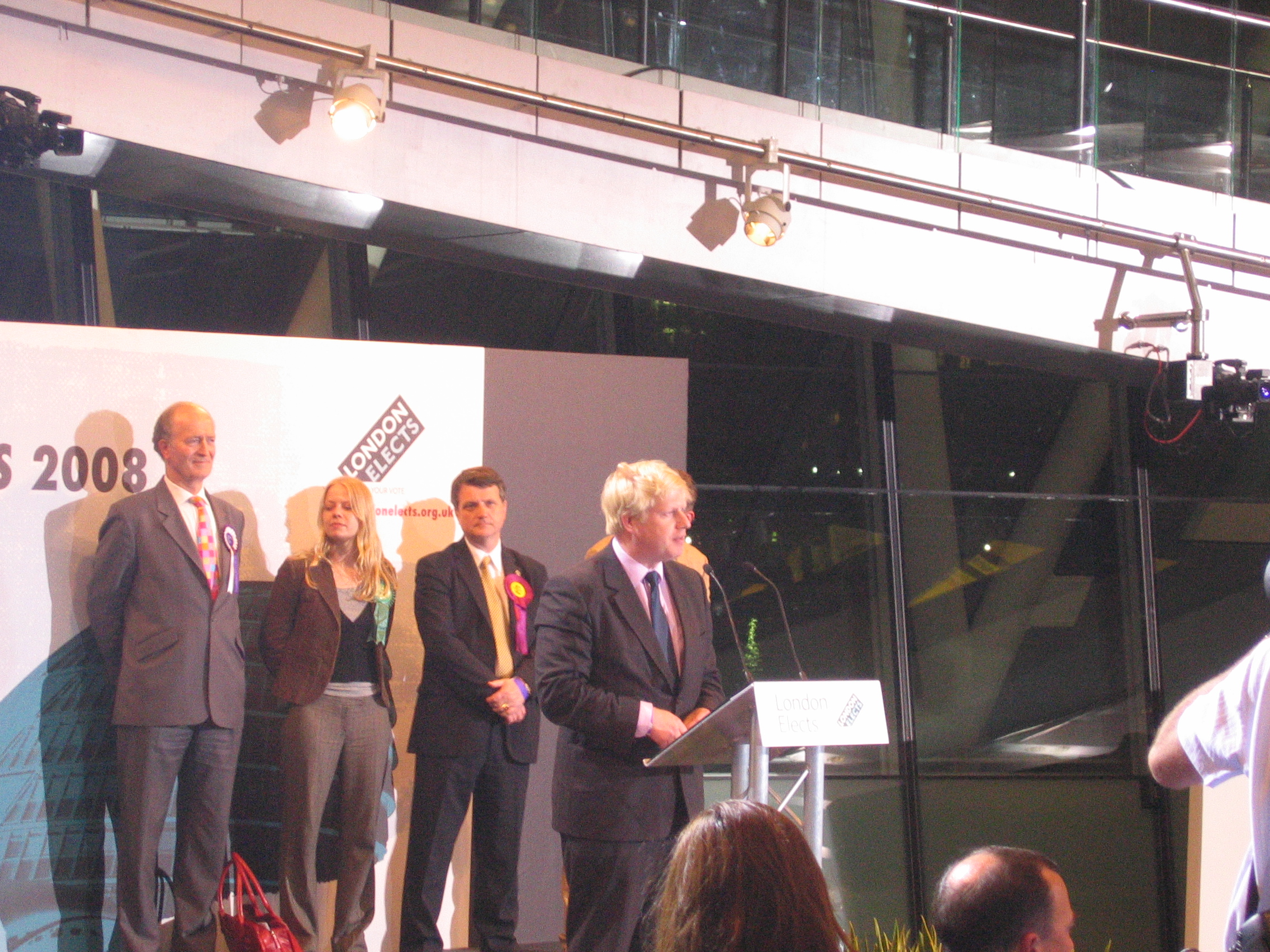
Johnson gave a victory speech in City Hall after being elected as the Mayor of London.

During the campaign, Johnson had confided to Brian Paddick he was unsure how he would maintain his lifestyle on the mayoral salary of £140,000 a year. He agreed to continue his Daily Telegraph column, thus earning a further £250,000 a year. His team believed this would cause controversy and made him promise to donate 20% of his Daily Telegraph salary to a charitable cause. Johnson resented this, and ultimately did not pay the full 20%. Controversy erupted when on the BBC's HARDtalk he referred to the £250,000 salary as "chicken feed"; this was at the time approximately 10 times the average yearly wage for a British worker.

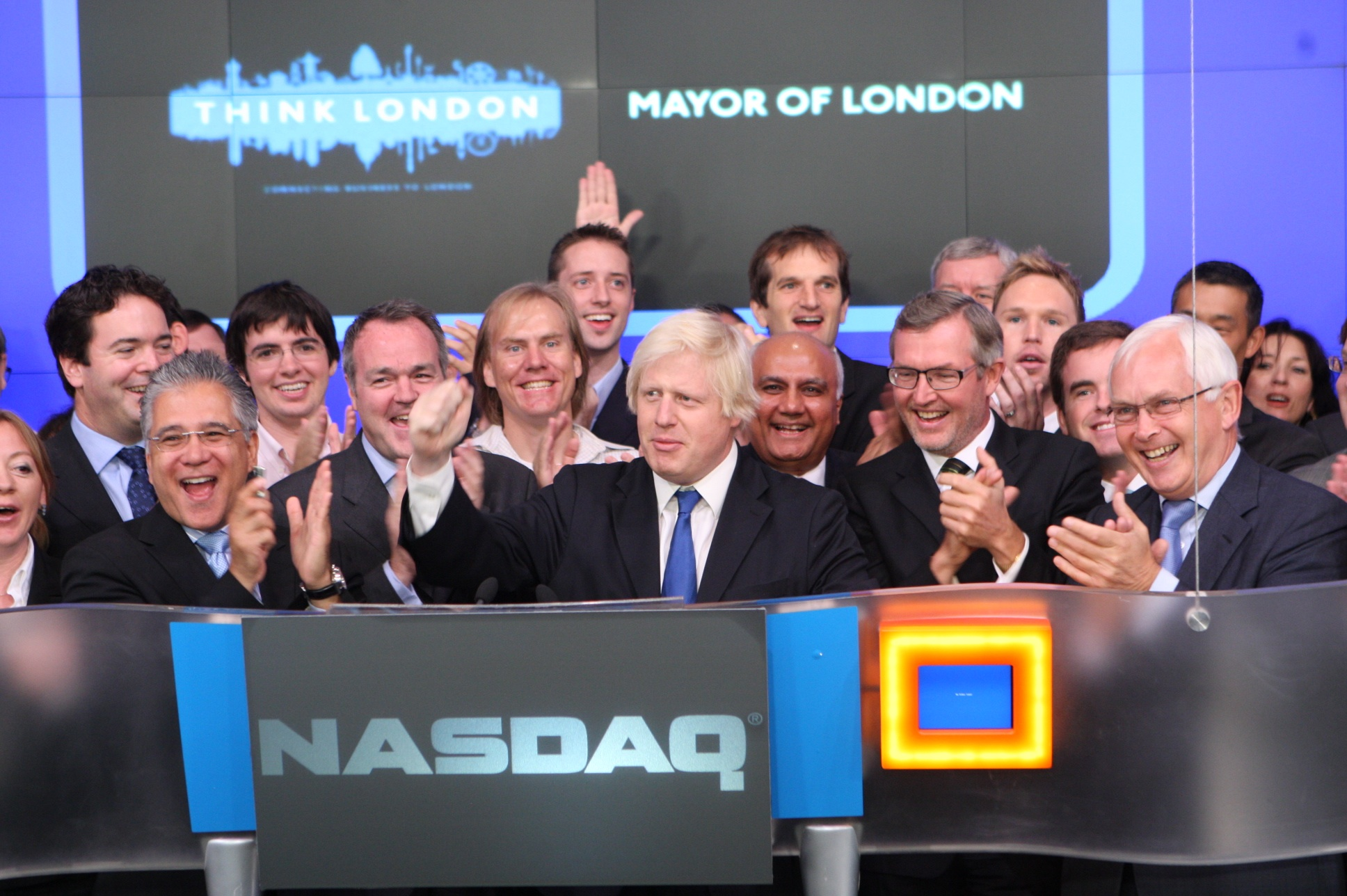
Johnson at the opening of NASDAQ in 2009

During his first administration, Johnson was embroiled in several personal scandals. After moving to a new house in Islington, he built a shed without obtaining planning permission; after neighbours complained, he dismantled it. The press also accused him of having an affair with Helen Macintyre and of fathering her child, allegations that he did not deny. Johnson was accused of warning Damian Green that police were planning to arrest him; Johnson denied the claims. He was accused of cronyism, in particular for appointing Veronica Wadley as the chair of London's Arts Council. In the parliamentary expenses scandal, he was accused of excessive expenses claims for taxis. Johnson remained a popular figure in London with a strong celebrity status in the city.

==== Policies ====
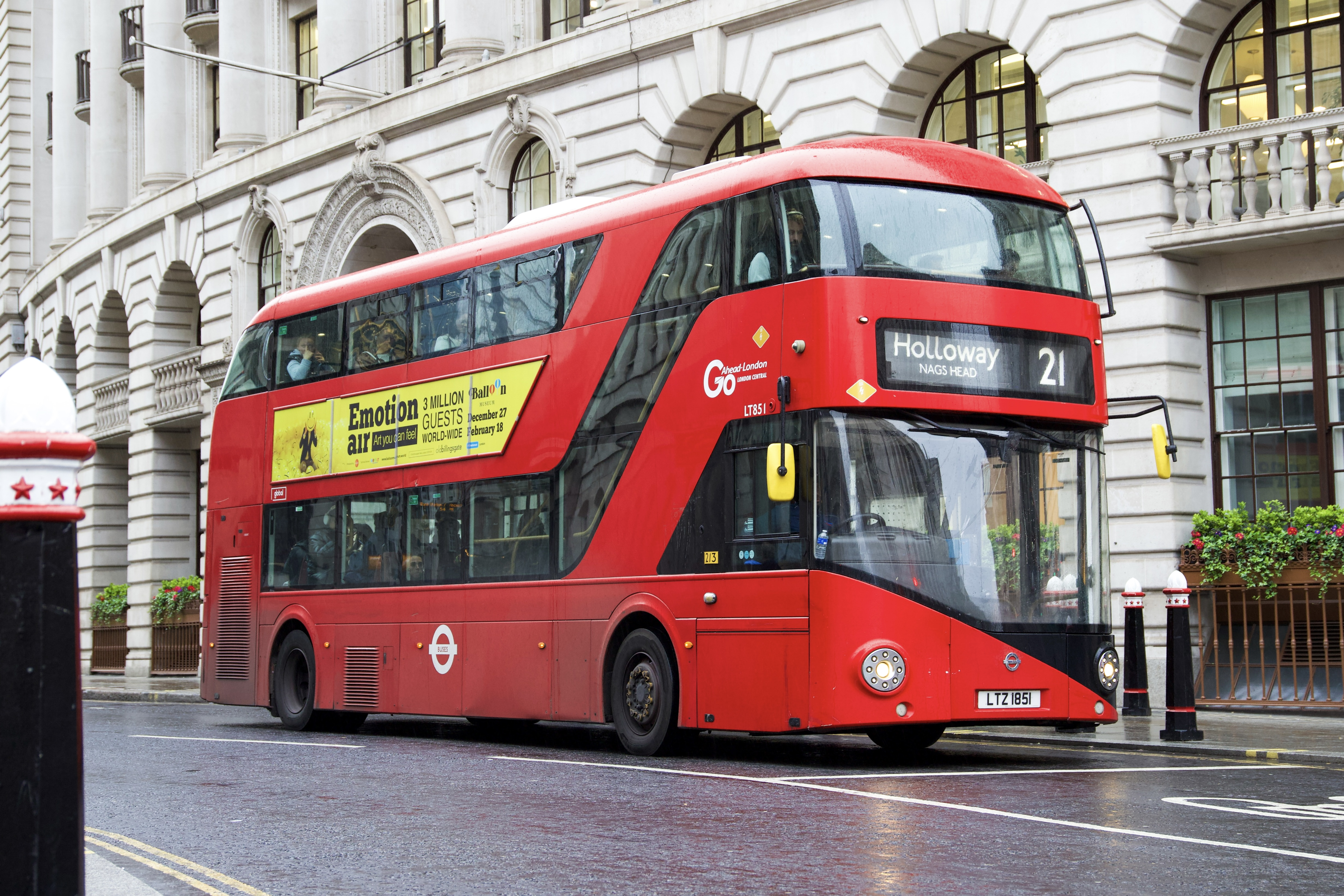
The New Routemaster bus introduced by Johnson's administration

Johnson made no major changes to the mayoral system of the previous administration. However, he did reverse several other measures implemented by Livingstone: ending the city's oil deal with Venezuela, abolishing The Londoner newsletter, and scrapping the half-yearly inspections of black cabs, which was reinstated three years later. Abolishing the western wing of the congestion charging zone, he cancelled plans to increase the congestion charge for four-wheel-drive vehicles. He was subsequently accused of failing to publish an independent report on air pollution commissioned by the Greater London Authority, which revealed the city breached legal limits on nitrogen dioxide levels.

Johnson retained Livingstone projects such as Crossrail and the 2012 Olympic Games, but was accused of trying to take credit for them. He introduced a public bicycle scheme that had been mooted by Livingstone's administration; colloquially known as "Boris Bikes", the part privately financed system was a significant financial loss but proved popular. Despite Johnson's support of cycling, and his much-publicised identity as a cyclist, some cycling groups argued he had failed to make the city's roads safer for cyclists. As per his election pledge, he commissioned the development of the New Routemaster buses for central London. He also ordered the construction of a cable car system that crossed the River Thames between the Greenwich Peninsula and the Royal Docks.

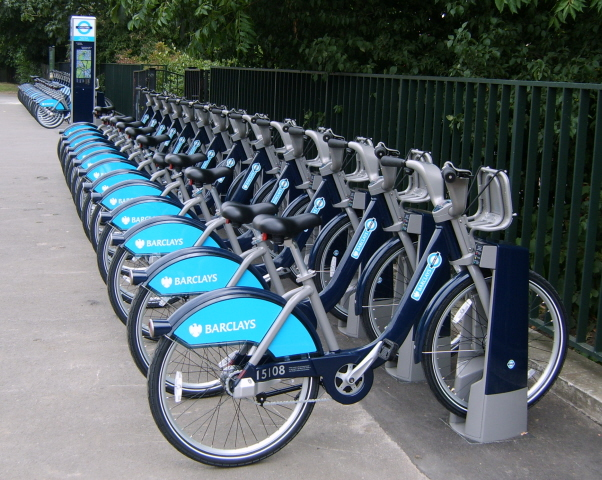
Johnson implemented Livingstone's idea of a public bicycle system; the result was dubbed the "Boris Bike".

Johnson's first policy initiative was a ban on drinking alcohol on public transport. He announced plans to extend pay-as-you-go Oyster cards to national rail services in London. A pledge in Johnson's manifesto was to retain Tube ticket offices, in opposition to Livingstone's proposal to close up to 40. On 2 July 2008, the Mayor's office announced the closure plan was to be abandoned. On 21 November 2013, Transport for London announced that all London Underground ticket offices would close by 2015. In financing these projects, Johnson's administration borrowed £100 million, while public transport fares were increased by 50%.

During his first term, Johnson was perceived as having moved leftward on certain issues, supporting the London Living Wage and endorsing an amnesty for illegal migrants. He tried placating critics who had deemed him a bigot by appearing at London's gay pride parade and praising ethnic minority newspapers. Johnson broke from the traditional protocol of those in public office not publicly commenting on other nations' elections by endorsing Barack Obama for the 2008 United States presidential election.

==== Relations with the police, finance, and the media ====
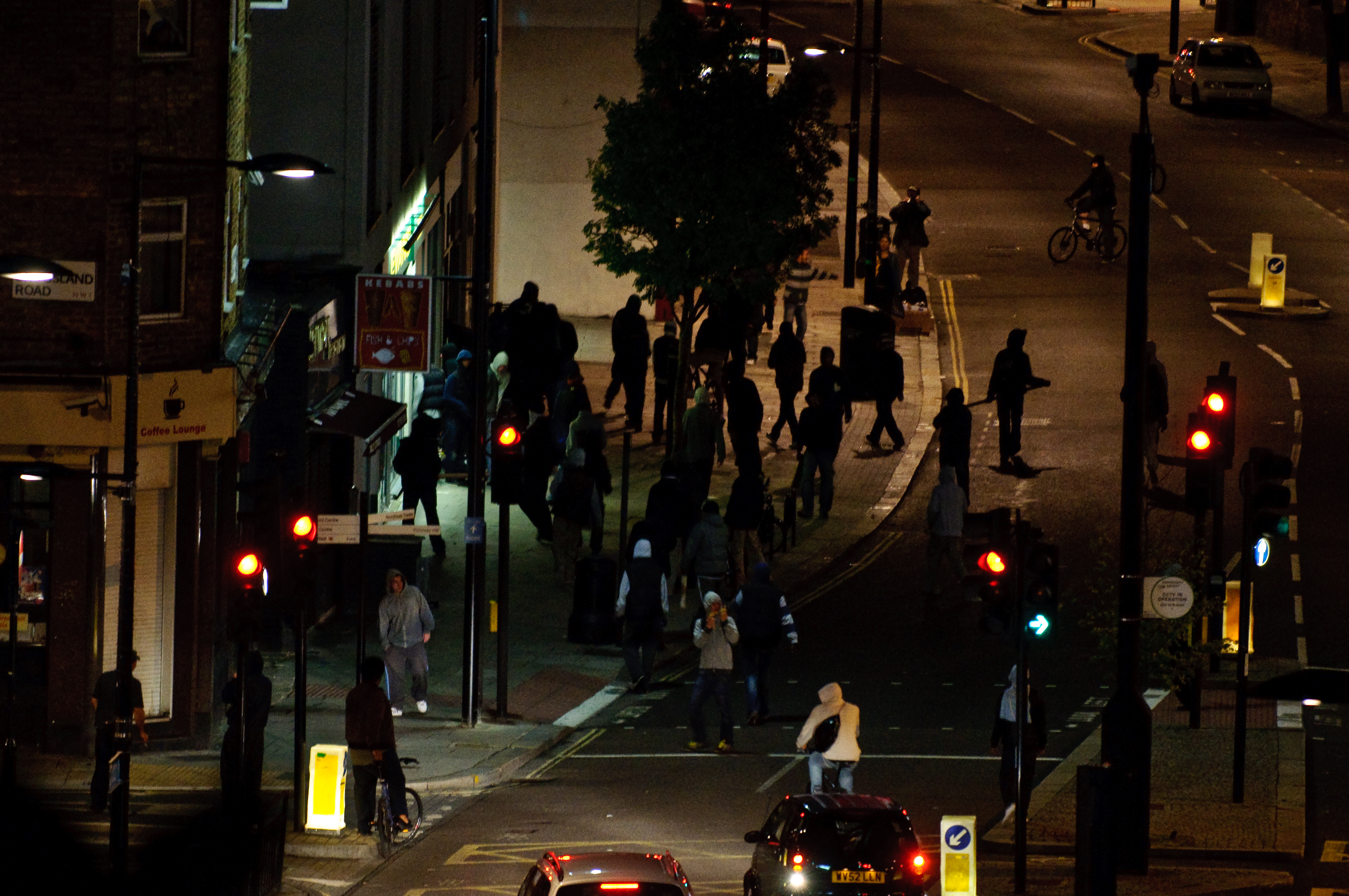
Johnson's response to the 2011 London riots was criticised.

Johnson appointed himself chair of the Metropolitan Police Authority (MPA), and in October 2008 successfully pushed for the resignation of Metropolitan Police Commissioner Ian Blair, after Blair was criticised for allegedly handing contracts to friends and for his handling of the death of Jean Charles de Menezes. This earned Johnson respect among Conservatives, who interpreted it as his first act of strength. Johnson resigned as chairman of the MPA in January 2010, but throughout his mayoralty was highly supportive of the Metropolitan Police, particularly during the controversy surrounding the death of Ian Tomlinson. Overall crime in London fell during his administration, but his claim that serious youth crime had decreased proved to be false, and he acknowledged the error. He was criticised for his response to the 2011 London riots.

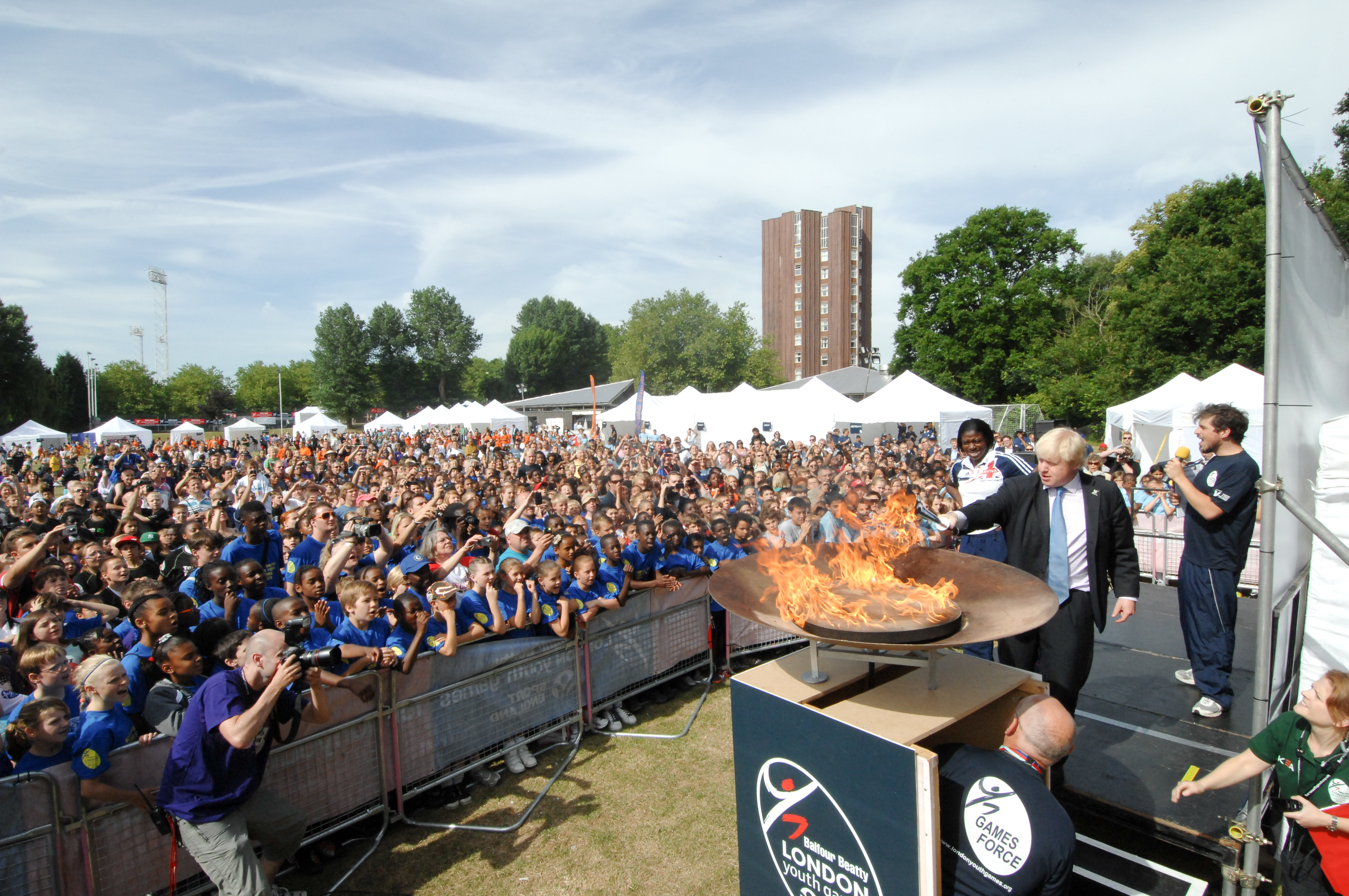
Johnson lights the flame at the 2010 London Youth Games opening ceremony.

Johnson championed London's financial sector and denounced what he saw as "banker bashing" following the 2008 financial crisis, condemning the anti-capitalist Occupy London movement that appeared in 2011. He collected donations from the city's wealthy for a charitable enterprise, the Mayor's Fund, which he had established to aid disadvantaged youths. It initially announced the fund would raise £100 million, but by 2010 it had only earnt £1.5 million. He also maintained extensive personal contacts throughout the British media, which resulted in widespread favourable press coverage of his administration. In turn he remained largely supportive of his friends in the media, including Rupert Murdoch, during the News International phone hacking scandal.

The formation of the Forensic Audit Panel was announced on 8 May 2008. The panel was tasked with monitoring and investigating financial management at the London Development Agency and the Greater London Authority. Johnson's announcement was criticised by Labour for the perceived politicisation of this nominally independent panel. The head of the panel, Patience Wheatcroft, was married to a Conservative councillor and three of the four remaining panel members also had close links to the Conservatives.

==== Re-election campaign ====
Up for re-election in 2012, Johnson again hired Crosby to orchestrate his campaign. Before the election, Johnson published Johnson's Life of London, a work of popular history that historian A. N. Wilson characterised as a "coded plea" for votes. Polls suggested that while Livingstone's approach to transport was preferred, voters in London placed greater trust in Johnson on crime and the economy. Johnson's campaign emphasised the accusation that Livingstone was guilty of tax evasion, for which Livingstone called Johnson a "bare-faced liar". Political scientist Andrew Crines believed that Livingstone's campaign focused on criticising Johnson rather than presenting an alternate and progressive vision of London's future. Johnson was re-elected.

=== Second term: 2012–2016 ===
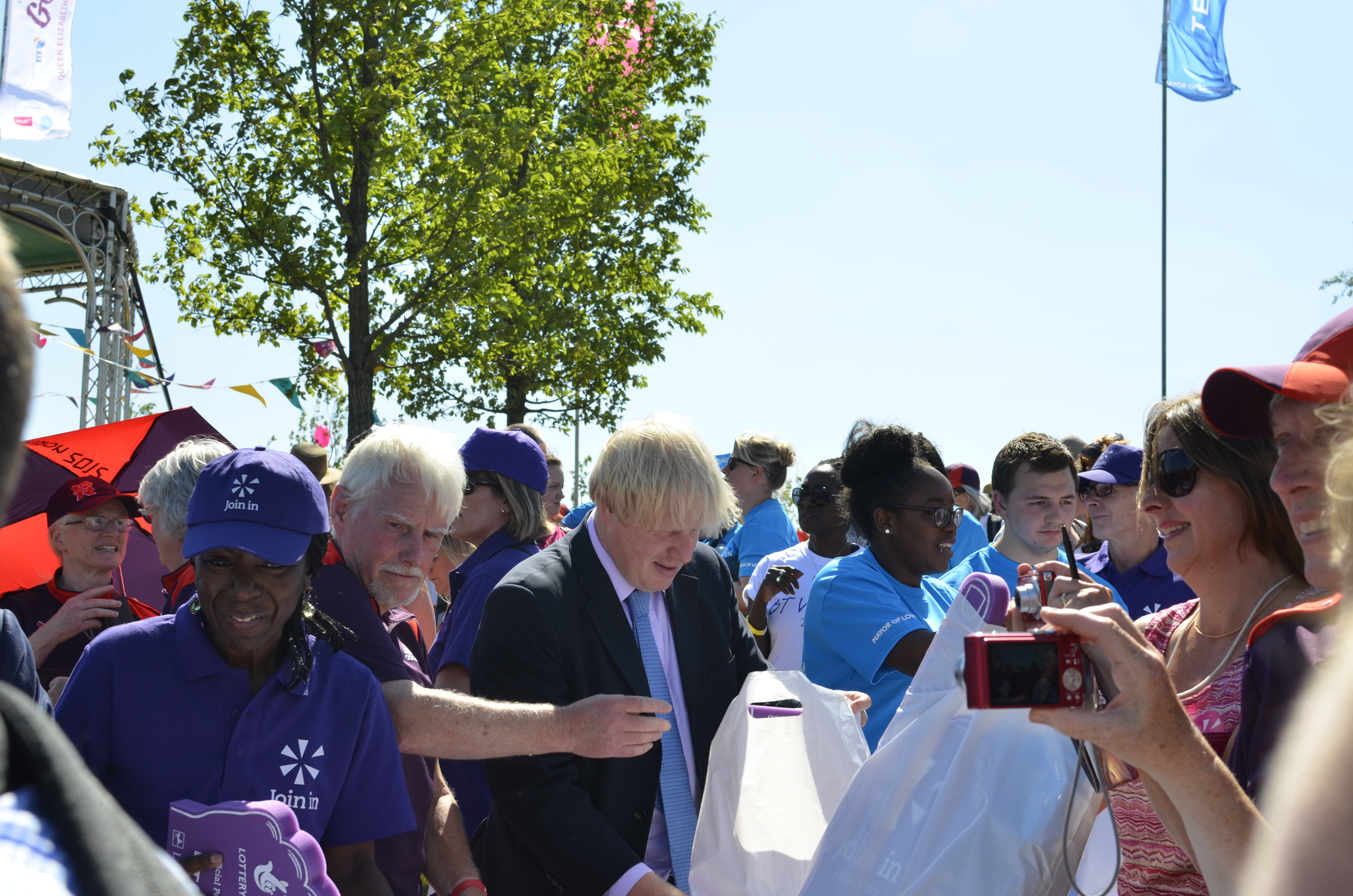
Johnson at the 2012 Summer Olympics

After a successful bid under Livingstone in 2005, London hosted the 2012 Summer Olympics, with Johnson as board co-chair. He improved transportation around London by making more tickets available and adding buses around the capital when thousands of spectators were temporary visitors. Johnson was accused of covering up pollution ahead of the games by deploying dust suppressants to remove air particulates near monitoring stations. In November 2013, Johnson announced major changes to the operation of the London Underground, including the extension of operating hours. All staffed ticket offices were replaced with automated ticketing systems.

Johnson was close friends with American entrepreneur and model Jennifer Arcuri, with The Sunday Times describing him as a regular visitor to her flat, and implying they were in a sexual relationship. Arcuri and her company, Innotech, were awarded substantial government grants, and Johnson intervened to allow her onto three trade mission trips. The Sunday Times said in September 2019 that Johnson failed to declare his personal relationship as a conflict of interest. The Greater London Authority referred the matter to the Independent Office for Police Conduct (IOPC) "so it can assess whether or not it is necessary to investigate the former mayor of London for the criminal offence of misconduct in public office", for the Mayor is also London's police and crime commissioner. On 9 November 2019 it was revealed that the IOPC had decided to publish its report after the general election on 12 December. The IOPC eventually issued its report in May 2020, concluding that, although there was no basis for any criminal charge, there was evidence that the close relationship between Johnson and Arcuri had influenced decisions, that Johnson should have declared an interest, and that his failure to do this could have breached the London Assembly's code of conduct.

In 2015, Johnson criticised then-presidential candidate Donald Trump's false comments that there were no-go zones in London inaccessible for non-Muslims. Johnson said Trump was "betraying a quite stupefying ignorance that makes him frankly unfit to hold the office of President of the United States", becoming the first senior politician in the UK to declare Trump unfit for office, but rejecting calls for him to be banned from the country. In 2016, he said he was "genuinely worried that [Trump] could become president", telling ITV's Tom Bradby that being mistaken for Trump in New York was "one of the worst moments" of his life.

Johnson did not run for a third term and stepped down on 5 May 2016 following the election. A YouGov poll commissioned at the end of Johnson's tenure revealed that 52% of Londoners believed he did a "good job" while 29% believed he did a "bad job".

== Return to Parliament ==
Johnson initially said that he would not return to the House of Commons while mayor. After much media speculation, in August 2014 he sought selection as the Conservative candidate for the safe seat of Uxbridge and South Ruislip at the 2015 general election. In the 2015 general election, Johnson was elected. There was speculation that he had returned to Parliament because he wanted to replace Cameron as Conservative leader and prime minister.

=== Brexit campaign: 2015–2016 ===
In February 2016, Johnson endorsed Vote Leave in the "Out" campaign for the 2016 European Union membership referendum. Following this announcement, which was interpreted by financial markets as making Brexit more probable, the pound sterling slumped by nearly 2% against the US dollar, reaching its lowest level since March 2009.

In April 2016, in response to a comment by President Barack Obama that Britain should remain in the European Union, Johnson wrote an "ancestral dislike" of Britain owing to his "part-Kenyan" background may have shaped Obama's views. Several politicians condemned his comments as racist and unacceptable. Conversely, former Conservative Party leader Iain Duncan Smith and UK Independence Party (UKIP) leader Nigel Farage defended them.

Johnson supported Vote Leave's statement that the government was committed to Turkish accession to the EU. Vote Leave was accused of implying that 80 million Turks would come to the UK if it stayed in the EU. When interviewed in January 2019, he said he had not mentioned Turkey during the campaign. In a televised debate on 22 June 2016, Johnson declared 23 June could be "Britain's independence day". According to James Murdoch, Johnson did not believe the Brexit referendum would pass and when, during a meeting between him and other executives of Fox News, he was asked its potential result he replied "We'll see".

Following the victory of the "Leave" campaign, Cameron resigned. Johnson was widely regarded as the front-runner to succeed him in the consequent Conservative leadership election but announced he would not stand. Shortly before this, Michael Gove, hitherto a Johnson ally, concluded that Johnson "cannot provide the leadership or build the team for the task ahead". The Daily Telegraph called Gove's comments "the most spectacular political assassination in a generation". Johnson endorsed Andrea Leadsom's candidature, but she dropped out, leaving Theresa May to be elected uncontested.

=== Foreign Secretary: 2016–2018 ===
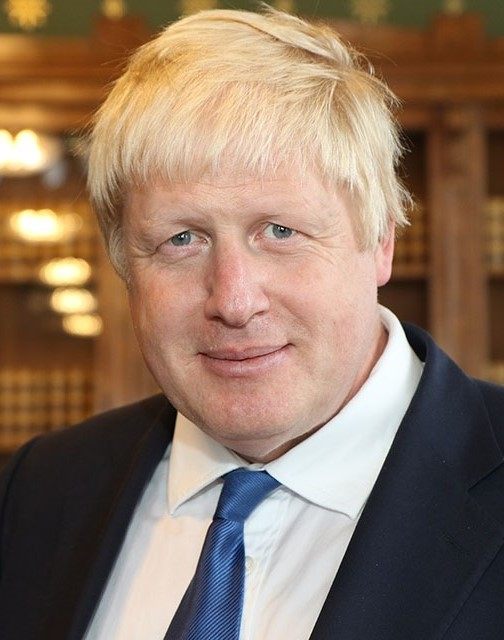
Official portrait of Johnson as Foreign Secretary

May appointed Johnson foreign secretary in July 2016. Analysts saw it as a tactic to weaken Johnson politically: the new positions of "Brexit secretary" and international trade secretary left the foreign secretary as a figurehead. Johnson's appointment ensured he would often be out of the country and unable to mobilise backbenchers against her, while forcing him to take responsibility for problems caused by withdrawing from the EU.

Some journalists and foreign politicians criticised Johnson's appointment because of his controversial statements about other countries. His tenure attracted criticism from diplomats and foreign policy experts. Several diplomats, FCO staff and foreign ministers who worked with Johnson compared his leadership unfavourably to previous foreign secretaries for his perceived lack of conviction or substantive positions. A senior official in Obama's government suggested Johnson's appointment would push the US further towards Germany at the expense of the Special Relationship with the UK. Egyptian president Abdel Fattah el-Sisi walked out of a meeting with Johnson after it did not "get beyond the pleasantries".

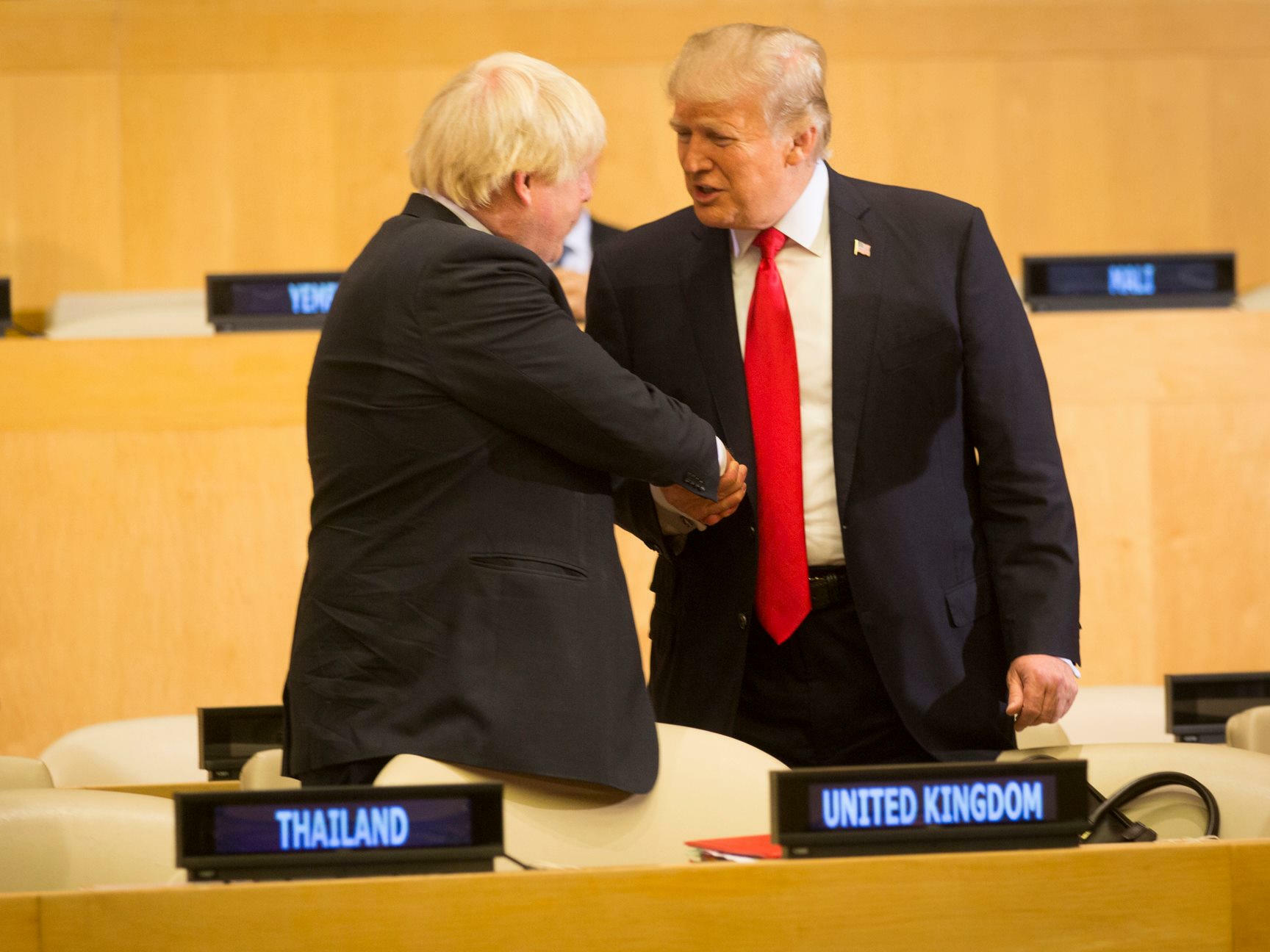
Johnson with US president Donald Trump in 2017 UNGA

Johnson's visit to Turkey in September 2016 was tense because he had won Douglas Murray's offensive poetry competition about the President of Turkey, Recep Tayyip Erdoğan, four months earlier. When questioned by a journalist whether he would apologise, Johnson dismissed the matter as "trivia". Johnson pledged to help Turkey join the EU and expressed support for Erdogan's government. Johnson described the Gülen movement as a "cult" and supported Turkey's post-coup purges. Johnson supported the Saudi Arabian–led intervention in Yemen and refused to block arms sales to Saudi Arabia. In September 2016, human rights groups accused him of blocking the UN inquiry into Saudi war crimes in Yemen. Given the UK-Saudi alliance, in December 2016, he attracted attention for commenting the Saudis were akin to the Iranians in "puppeteering and playing proxy wars". In 2017, Johnson told the Foreign Affairs Select Committee that Nazanin Zaghari-Ratcliffe – a British-Iranian citizen imprisoned in Iran after being arrested for training journalists in a BBC World Service Trust project – had been "simply teaching people journalism". Facing criticism, Johnson stated he had been misquoted and nothing he said had justified Zaghari-Ratcliffe's sentence. In 2018, Johnson backed the Iran nuclear deal framework, despite Trump's withdrawal.

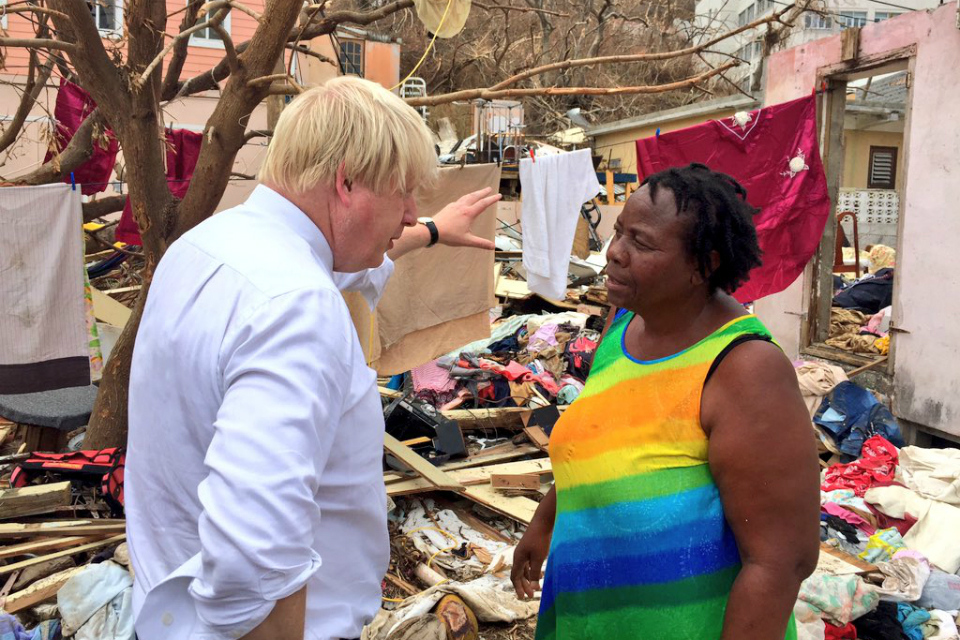
Johnson visiting the British Virgin Islands after Hurricane Irma

In 2017, Johnson said that Gibraltar's sovereignty was "not going to change" after Brexit. Johnson promised while in Northern Ireland that Brexit would leave the Irish border "absolutely unchanged". Johnson visited Anguilla and Tortola in September 2017 to confirm the UK's commitment to helping restore British territories devastated by Hurricane Irma. In September 2017, he was criticised for reciting lines from Rudyard Kipling's Mandalay while visiting a Myanmar temple; the British ambassador, who was with him, suggested it was "not appropriate". In October 2017, he faced criticism for stating the Libyan city of Sirte could become an economic success like Dubai: "all they have to do is clear the dead bodies away".

Initially favouring a less hostile approach to Russia, Johnson soon backed a more aggressive policy. Following the March 2018 poisoning of Sergei and Yulia Skripal in Salisbury, an act which the UK government blamed on Russia, Johnson compared Vladimir Putin's hosting of the World Cup in Russia to Adolf Hitler's hosting of the Olympic Games in Berlin. Russia's Foreign Ministry denounced Johnson's "unacceptable and unworthy" parallel towards Russia, a "nation that lost millions of lives in fighting Nazism". Johnson described the Nord Stream 2 gas pipeline from Russia to Germany as "divisive" and a "threat" that left Europe dependent on a "malign Russia" for its energy supplies.

Johnson condemned the persecution of Rohingya Muslims in Myanmar, comparing the situation with the displacement of Palestinians in 1948. Johnson supported the Turkish invasion of northern Syria aimed at ousting the Syrian Kurds from Afrin. He accused the UNHRC of focusing disproportionately on the Israeli–Palestinian conflict and Israel's occupation of the Palestinian territories.

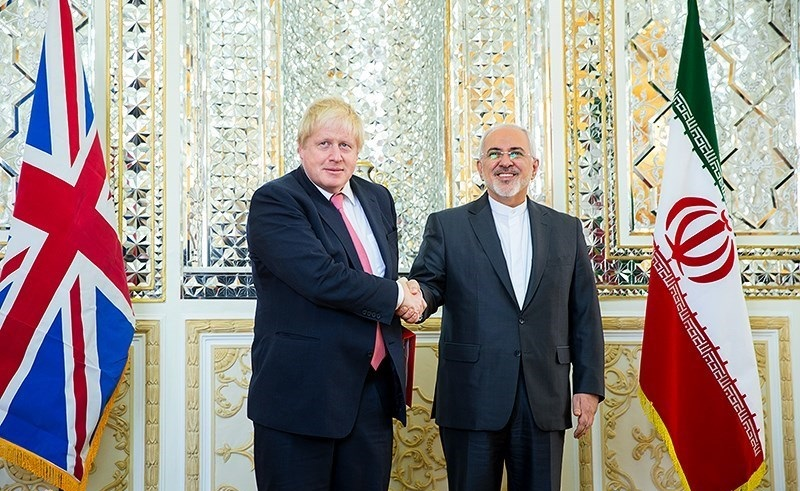
Johnson meeting with Iranian foreign minister Mohammad Javad Zarif in Tehran in December 2017

In a September 2017 op-ed, Johnson reiterated the UK would regain control of £350m a week after Brexit, suggesting it go to the National Health Service (NHS). Cabinet colleagues criticised him for reviving the assertion. Following the 2017 general election, Johnson denied media reports he intended to challenge May's leadership. In a February 2018 letter to May, Johnson suggested that Northern Ireland may have to accept border controls after Brexit, and it would not seriously affect trade, having said a hard border would be unthinkable. In June, he was reported to have said "fuck business" when asked about corporate concerns regarding a 'hard' Brexit.

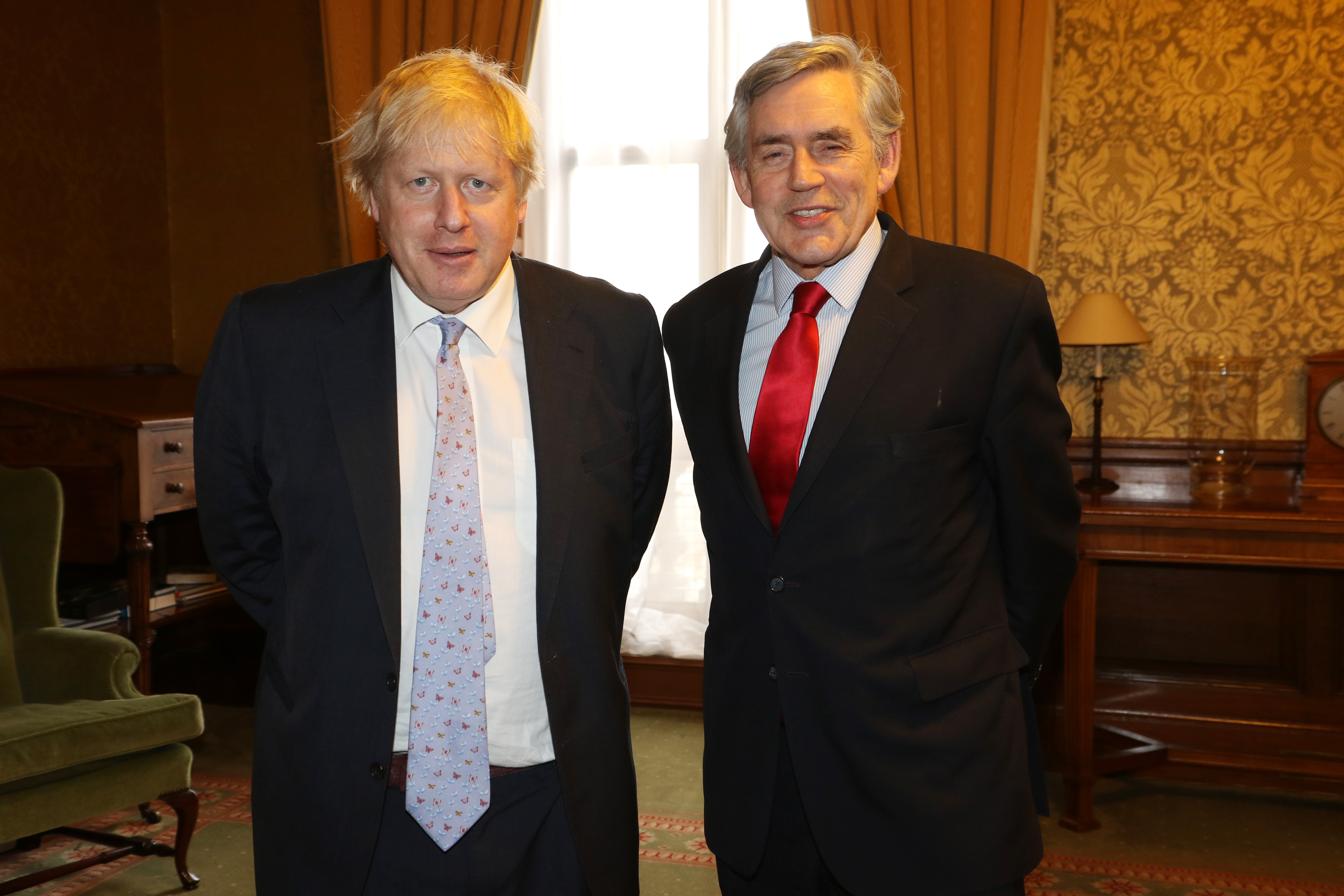
Johnson with former UK prime minister Gordon Brown in May 2018

Secret recordings obtained in June 2018 revealed Johnson's dissatisfaction with Prime Minister May's negotiating style, accusing her of being too collaborative with the EU in Brexit negotiations. Comparing May's approach to Trump – who at the time was engaged in a combative trade war with the EU because it raised tariffs on metal – Johnson said: "Imagine Trump doing Brexit. He'd go in bloody hard ... There'd be all sorts of breakdowns, all sorts of chaos. Everyone would think he'd gone mad. But actually you might get somewhere." He accused individuals of scaremongering over a Brexit "meltdown", saying "No panic. Pro bono publico, no bloody panic. It's going to be all right in the end."

In April 2018, Johnson travelled to Italy to attend a party at the Palazzo Terranova, owned by former KGB agent Alexander Lebedev and hosted by his son Evgeny. He travelled without security protection or other officials, and did not document the trip, which led to accusations of Johnson having misled parliament. In 2023, it was revealed that Lord Simon McDonald, the most senior civil servant of his department, was unaware of the trip. Johnson stated that "no government business was discussed" at the event as far as he was aware. Lebedev's villa was monitored by the Italian secret service, who suspected it to be used for espionage activities. Johnson granted a peerage to Evgeny in 2020, against the advice of the MI6, and met with criticism over security concerns.

In July 2018, three days after the cabinet had its meeting to agree on a Brexit strategy, Johnson, along with Brexit secretary David Davis, resigned his post.

=== Return to the backbenches: 2018–2019 ===
Johnson returned to the role of a backbench MP. In July, he delivered a resignation speech, stating "it is not too late to save Brexit". In January 2019, Johnson came under criticism for remarks he had made during the 2016 Leave campaign regarding the prospect of Turkish accession to the European Union; he denied making such remarks. In March 2019, he was criticised for saying that expenditure on investigating historic allegations of child abuse was money "spaffed up the wall".

==== Journalism ====
In July 2018, Johnson signed a 12‑month contract to write articles for the Telegraph Media Group. The Advisory Committee on Business Appointments (ACOBA) reported that this was a breach of the Ministerial Code. Johnson was ordered to apologise for failing to declare £50,000 of earnings. The Parliamentary Commissioner for Standards found the errors were not inadvertent, and that Johnson had failed on nine occasions to make declarations within the rules.

In September 2018, Johnson wrote: "We have opened ourselves to perpetual political blackmail. We have wrapped a suicide vest around the British constitution – and handed the detonator to Michel Barnier." Senior Tories heavily criticised him, with Alan Duncan of the Foreign Office vowing to ensure the comments marked "the political end of Boris Johnson". In April 2019, the Independent Press Standards Organisation ruled that a claim in a 6 January 2019 article in The Daily Telegraph, "The British people won't be scared into backing a woeful Brexit deal nobody voted for", authored by Johnson, that a no-deal Brexit was "by some margin preferred by the British public" was false, and "represented a failure to take care over the accuracy of the article in breach of Clause 1 (i)" of its guidelines, and required that a correction be published.

==== 2019 Conservative Party leadership election ====
The logo used by Johnson's leadership campaign in 2019

On 12 June 2019, Johnson launched his campaign for the Conservative Party leadership election, saying, "we must leave the EU on 31 October." On the campaign trail, Johnson warned of "catastrophic consequences for voter trust in politics" if the government pushed the EU for further delays. He advocated removing the backstop from any Brexit deal. On 25 and 26 August, he announced plans to retain £7 or £9 billion of the £39 billion divorce payment the UK was due to transfer to the EU upon withdrawal. Johnson initially pledged to cut income tax for earners of more than £50,000 but backed away from this plan in June 2019 after coming under criticism in a televised BBC debate.

Johnson was elected leader with 92,153 votes (66%) to Hunt's 46,656 (34%).

== Premiership (2019–2022) ==
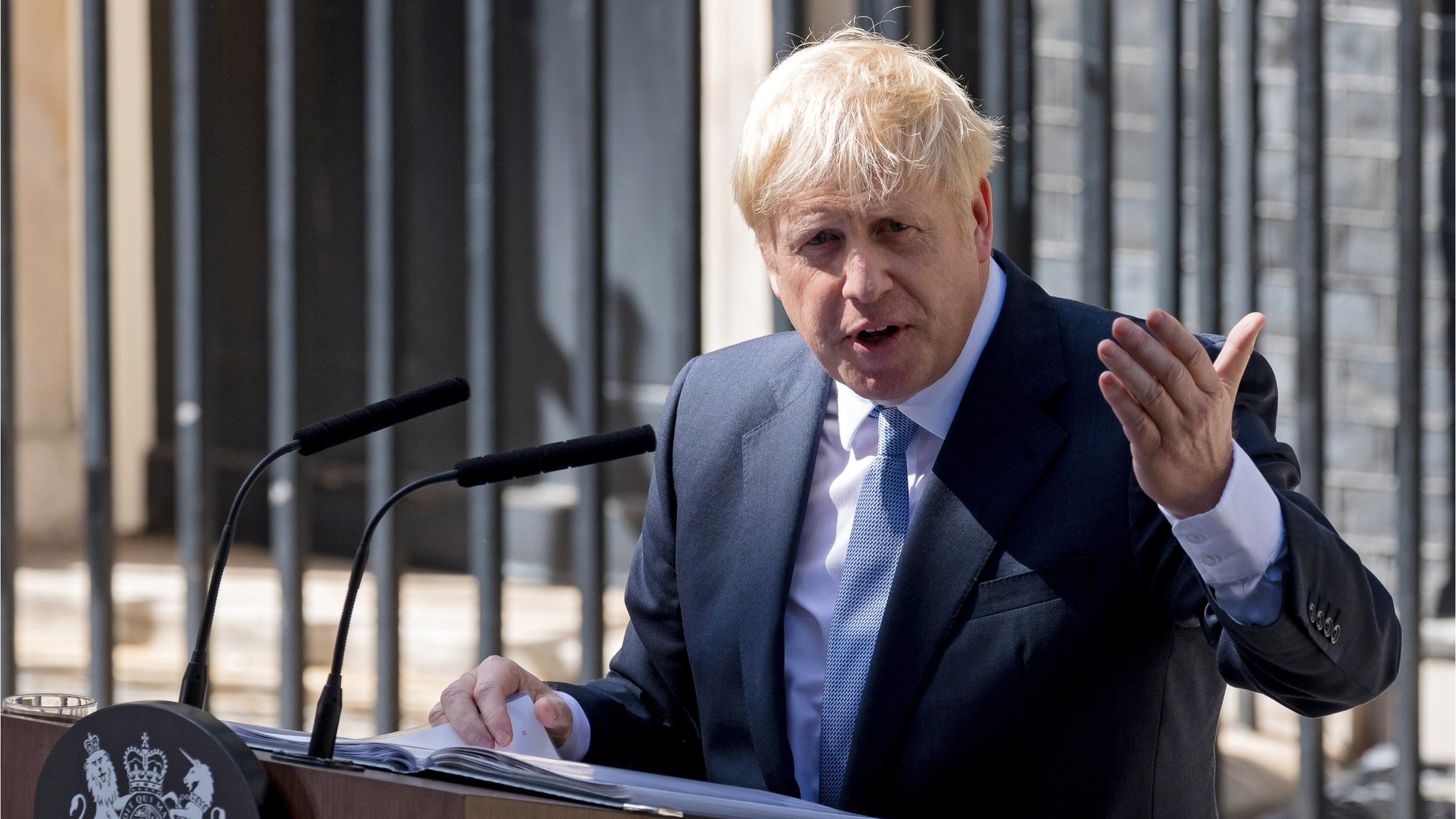
Johnson giving his first speech as Prime Minister on 24 July 2019

=== First term (July–December 2019) ===
On 24 July 2019, the day following Johnson's election as Conservative Party leader, Queen Elizabeth II accepted Theresa May's resignation and appointed Johnson as prime minister. This made Johnson the first prime minister to be born outside British territories. Johnson appointed Dominic Cummings as his senior advisor.

==== Brexit policy ====
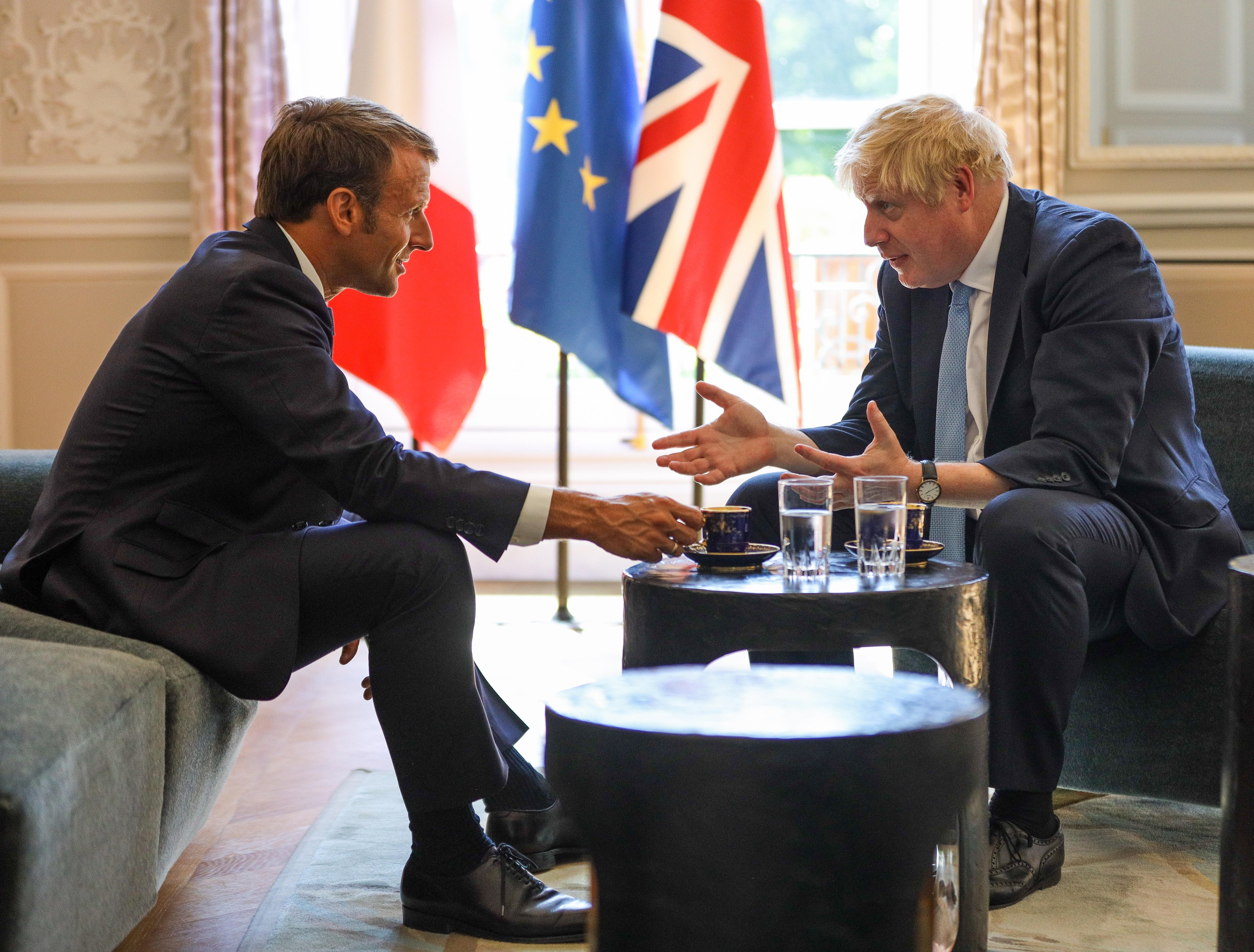
Johnson discussing Brexit with French president Emmanuel Macron in Paris

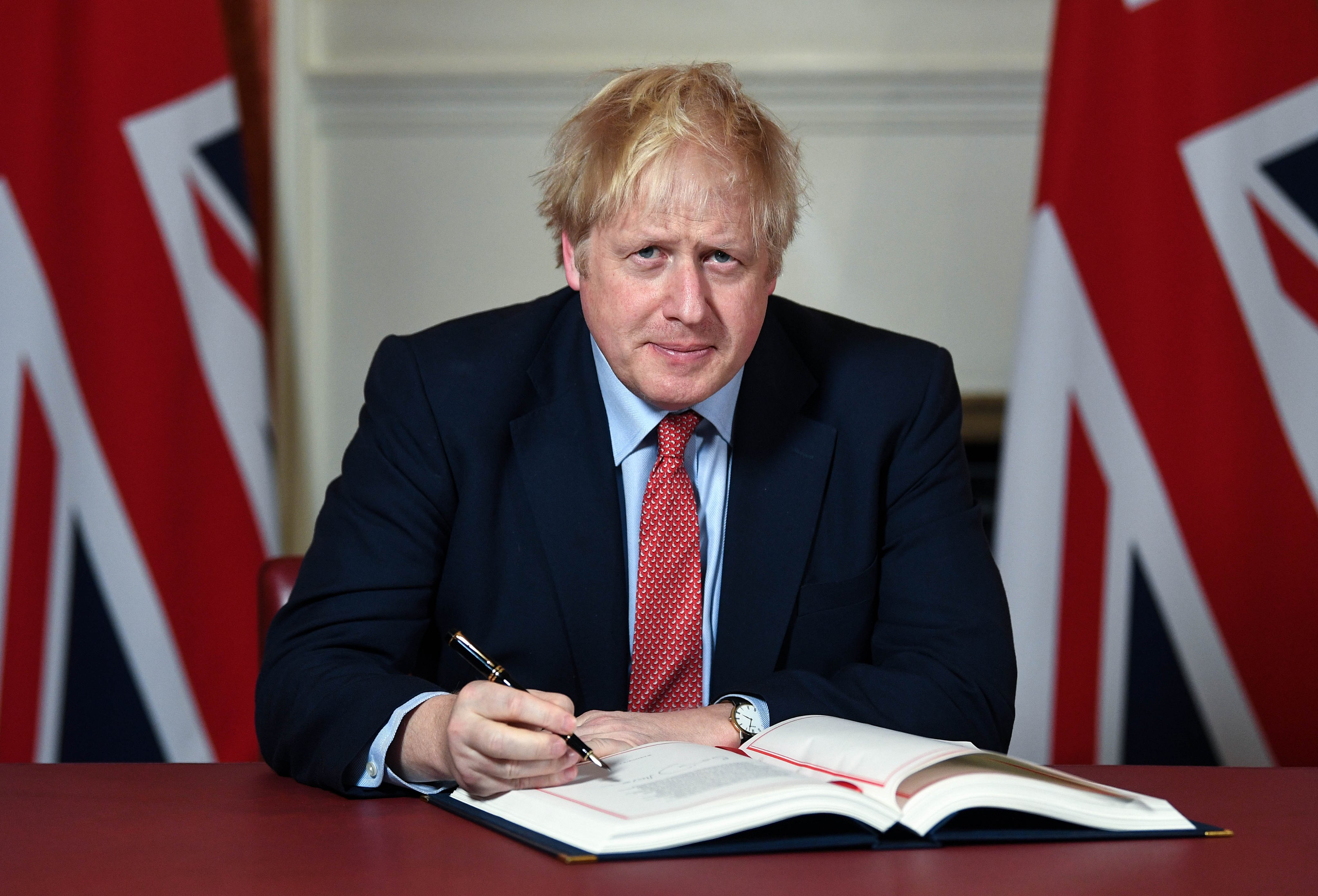
Johnson signing the Brexit Withdrawal Agreement

In his first speech as PM, Johnson said that the United Kingdom would leave the European Union on 31 October 2019 with or without a deal, and promised to remove the Irish backstop from the withdrawal agreement. Johnson declared his intention to re-open negotiations, but talks did not immediately resume as the EU refused to accept Johnson's condition that the backstop be removed. On 28 August 2019, UK and EU negotiators agreed to resume regular meetings.

Also on 28 August 2019, Johnson declared he had asked the Queen to prorogue Parliament from 10 September, reducing the time in which Parliament could block a no-deal Brexit and causing a political controversy. The Queen at Privy Council approved prorogation later the same day, and it began on 10 September, scheduled to last until 14 October. Some suggested that this prorogation amounted to a self-coup, and on 31 August 2019, protests occurred throughout the United Kingdom. By 2 September 2019, three separate court cases challenging Johnson's action were in progress or scheduled to take place, and on 11 September, three Scottish judges ruled the prorogation of the UK Parliament to be unlawful. On 12 September, Johnson denied lying to the Queen over suspension of the Parliament, while a Belfast Court rejected claims that his Brexit plans would have a negative impact on Northern Ireland's peace policy. On 24 September, the Supreme Court ruled unanimously that Johnson's advice to prorogue Parliament was unlawful, and therefore the prorogation was rendered null.

When Parliament resumed on 3 September 2019, Johnson indicated he would call a general election under the Fixed-term Parliaments Act after opposition and rebel Conservative MPs successfully voted against the government to take control of the order of business to prevent a no-deal exit. Despite government opposition, the Benn Act, a bill to block a no-deal exit, passed the Commons on 4 September 2019, causing Johnson to propose a general election on 15 October. His motion was unsuccessful as it failed to command the support of two-thirds of the House.

In October 2019, following bilateral talks between Johnson and Taoiseach Leo Varadkar, the UK and EU agreed to a revised deal, which replaced the backstop with a new Northern Ireland Protocol.

==== First Cabinet ====
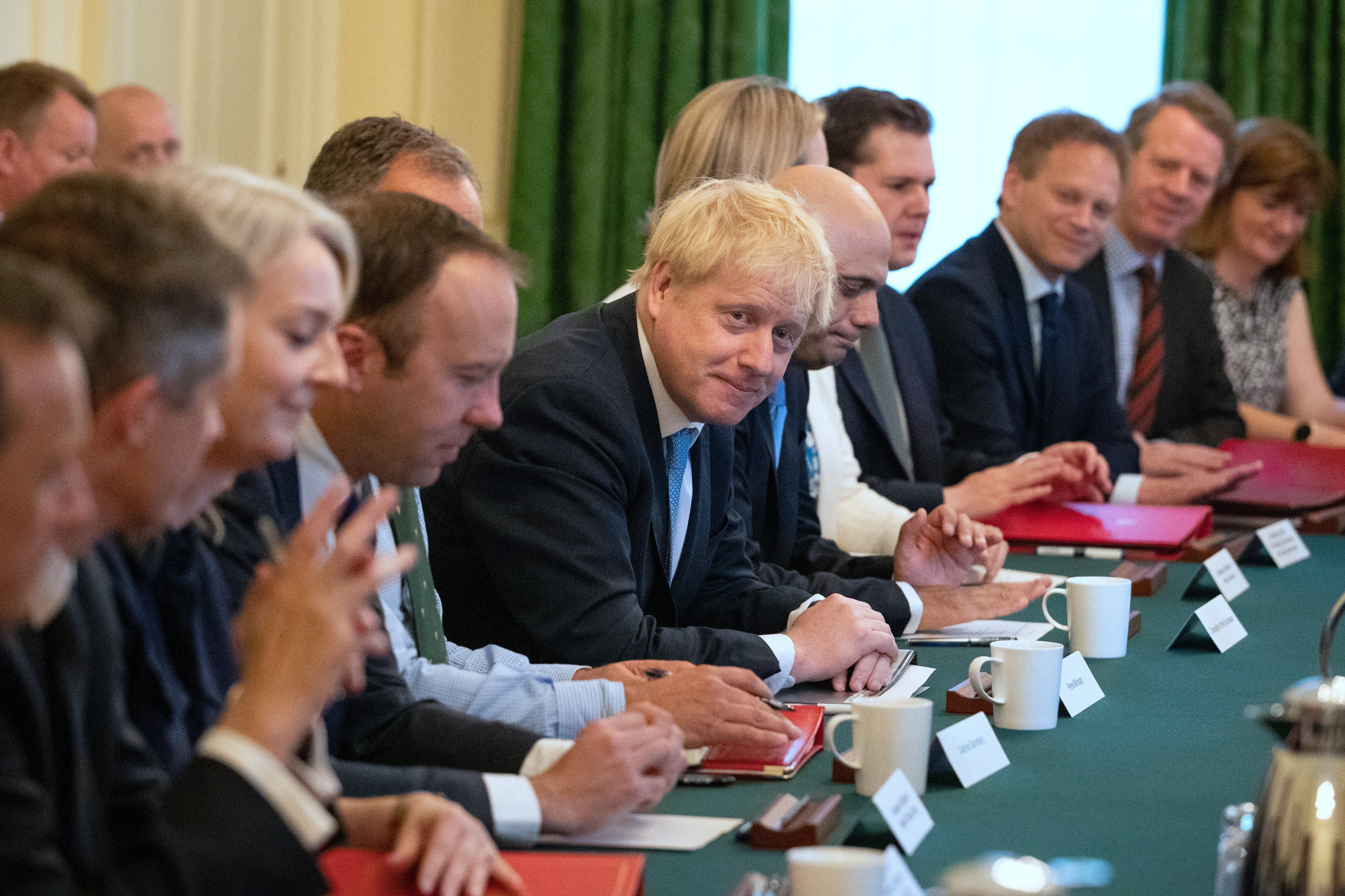
Johnson holding his first cabinet meeting at 10 Downing Street, 25 July 2019

Johnson appointed his Cabinet on 24 July 2019, dismissing 11 senior ministers and accepting the resignation of six others. The mass dismissal was the most extensive postwar Cabinet reorganisation without a change in the ruling party.

Johnson made Dominic Raab the First Secretary of State and foreign secretary.

Sajid Javid became Chancellor of the Exchequer

Priti Patel became Home Secretary.

==== Loss of working majority ====
On 3 September 2019, Phillip Lee crossed the floor to the Liberal Democrats following a disagreement with Johnson's Brexit policy. This left the government without a working majority in the House of Commons. Later that day, 21 Conservative MPs had the party whip withdrawn for defying party orders and supporting an opposition motion. (The whip was restored to 10 former Conservative ministers on 29 October.)

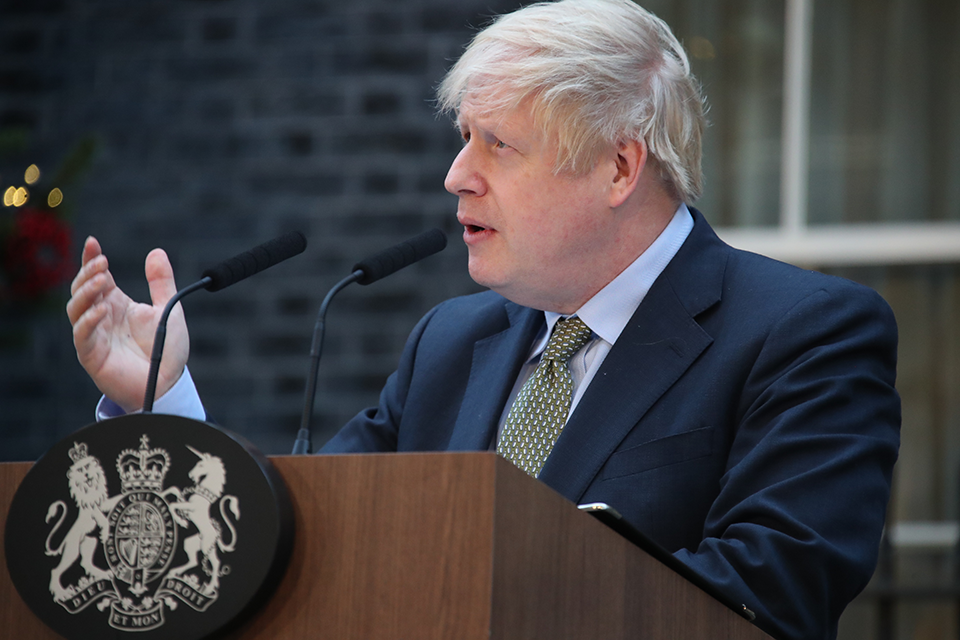
Johnson giving a speech in December 2019 after the 2019 general election

On 5 September 2019, Johnson's brother Jo Johnson resigned from the government and announced that he would step down as MP, describing his position as "torn between family and national interest". Two days later, Amber Rudd resigned as Secretary of State for Work and Pensions and from the Conservative Party, describing the withdrawal of the party whip as an "assault on decency and democracy".

==== 2019 general election ====
In October 2019, Parliament was dissolved, and an election called for 12 December. The election resulted in the Conservative Party winning 43.6% of the vote and a parliamentary landslide majority of 80 seats. A key slogan used in the Conservative campaign was "Get Brexit Done".

=== Second term (December 2019 – September 2022) ===
==== Second Cabinet ====
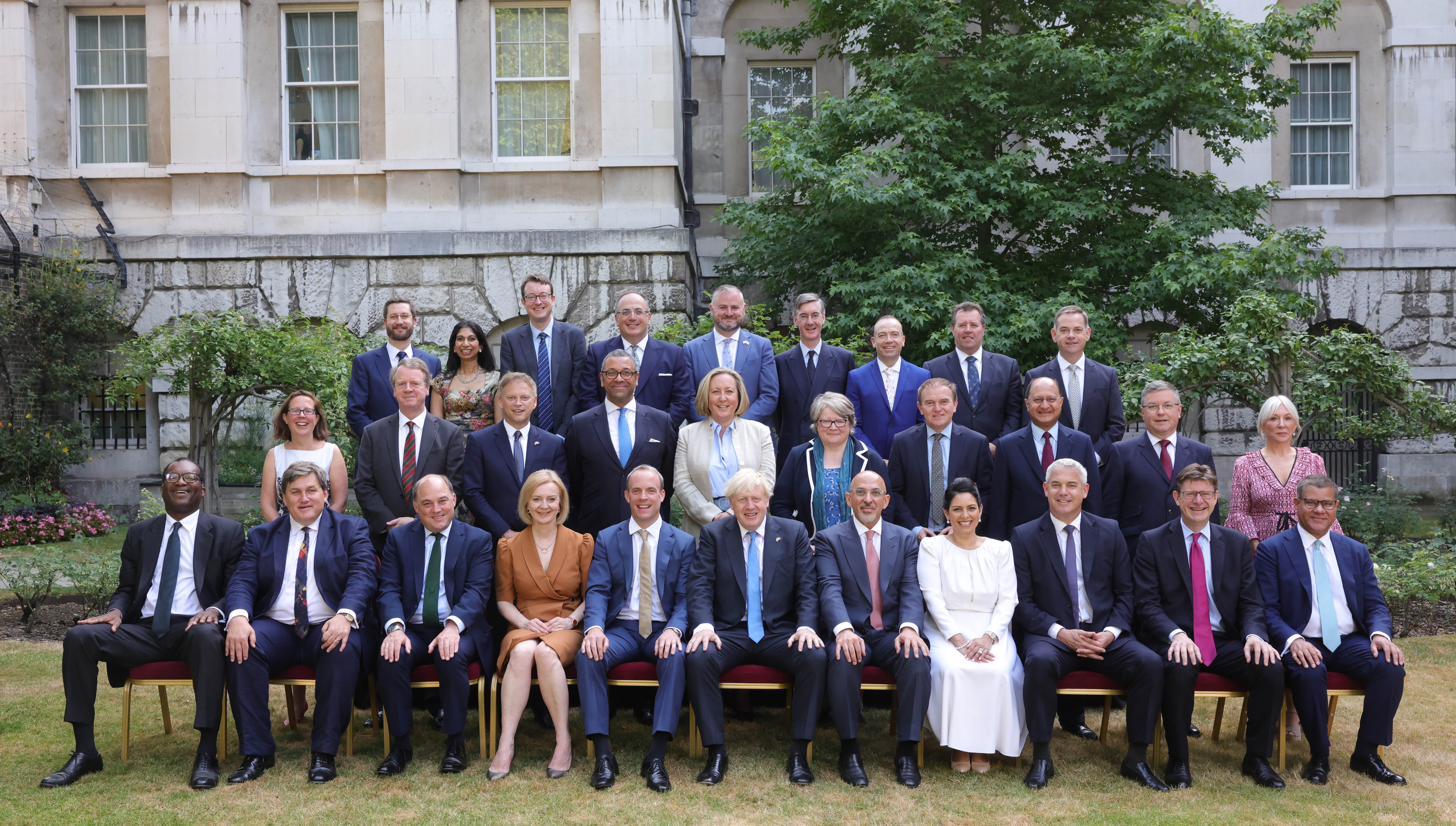
Johnson with his cabinet in 2022

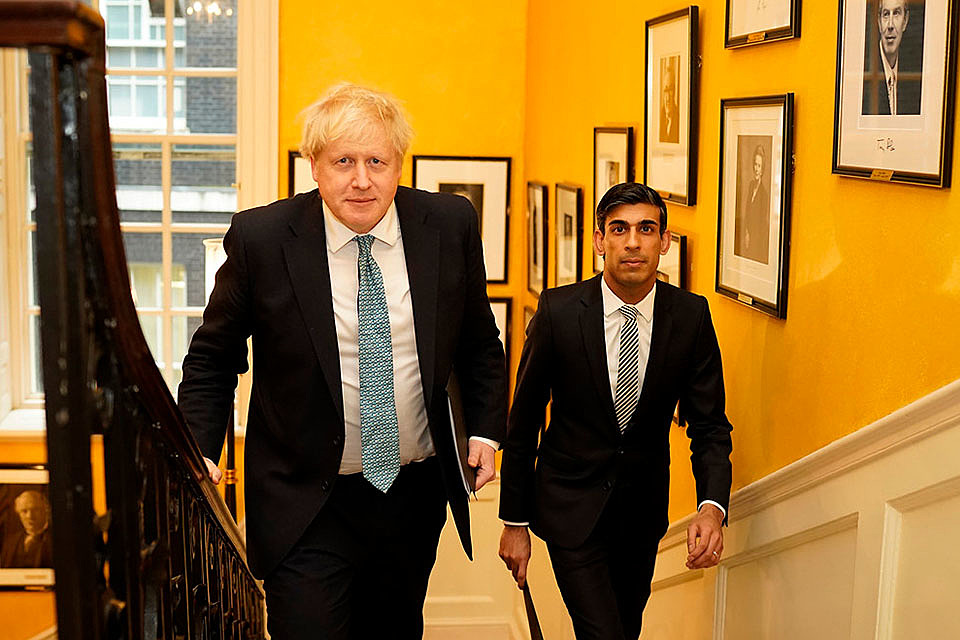
Johnson appointed Rishi Sunak (right) as Chancellor of the Exchequer in the February 2020 cabinet reshuffle.

Johnson reshuffled his cabinet in February 2020. Five Cabinet ministers were sacked, including the Northern Ireland secretary Julian Smith, a decision that was criticised by several politicians and commentators following his success in restoring the Northern Ireland Executive devolved government. Chancellor of the Exchequer Sajid Javid resigned from the Cabinet and was replaced by Rishi Sunak; Javid later returned to Johnson's Cabinet as Secretary of State for Health and Social Care in June 2021 following the resignation of Matt Hancock.

Johnson reshuffled his cabinet again in September 2021. Changes included the dismissal of Education Secretary Gavin Williamson who had received significant criticism for his handling of disruption to education during the COVID-19 pandemic. Dominic Raab was moved from foreign secretary to deputy prime minister and justice secretary. Raab was replaced as foreign secretary by Liz Truss.

==== COVID-19 pandemic ====
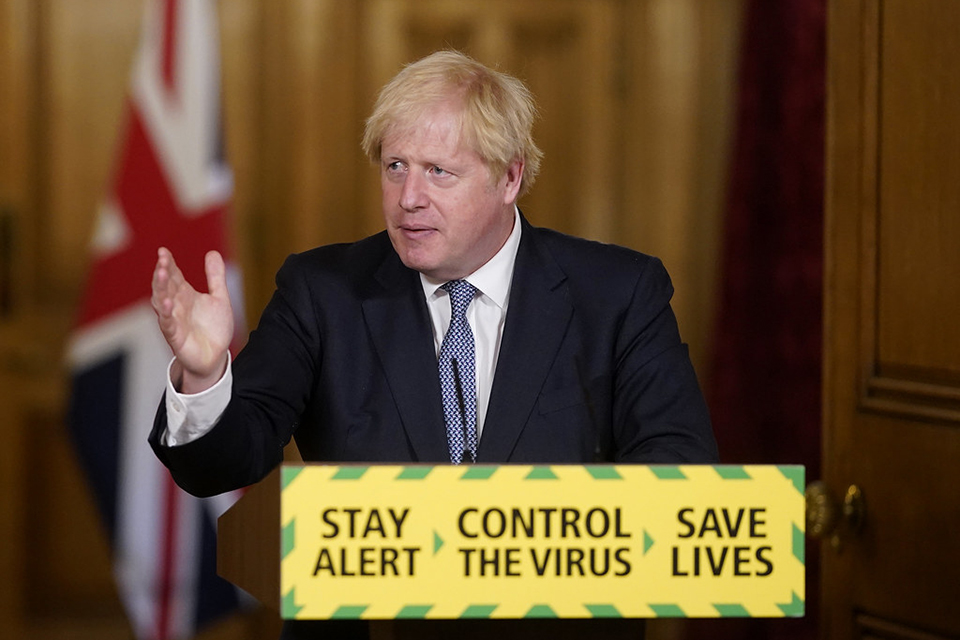
Johnson delivering a press conference on COVID-19, 31 July 2020

The COVID-19 pandemic emerged as a serious crisis within the first few months of Johnson's second term. Johnson's non-attendance of five COBR briefings during the early months and the failure of the UK government to prepare for and control the outbreak has been criticised. The UK was among the last major European states to close schools, ban public events and order a lockdown. This response is thought by some scientists to have contributed to the UK's high death toll from COVID-19, which was the highest in Europe and among the highest in the world.

Reuters reported that scientists were critical of Johnson both for acting too slowly to stop the spread of COVID-19 and for mishandling the government's response; Politico quoted Chief Medical Officer Chris Whitty as saying that an earlier initial lockdown would have significantly lowered the death toll. The BMJ published several editorials critical of the policies adopted during the country's public health response. Johnson's public communication over the virus and the UK's test and trace system were also criticised.

On 3 March 2020 Johnson claimed to have shaken hands with COVID-19 patients in hospital on the same day that SAGE had advised the government to warn the public not to shake hands and minimise physical contact, though it was unclear whether the hospital he visited actually contained any coronavirus patients. He continued to shake hands publicly in the following days. On 23 March, a COVID-19 lockdown was imposed throughout the UK, except for a few limited purposes, backed up by new legal powers.

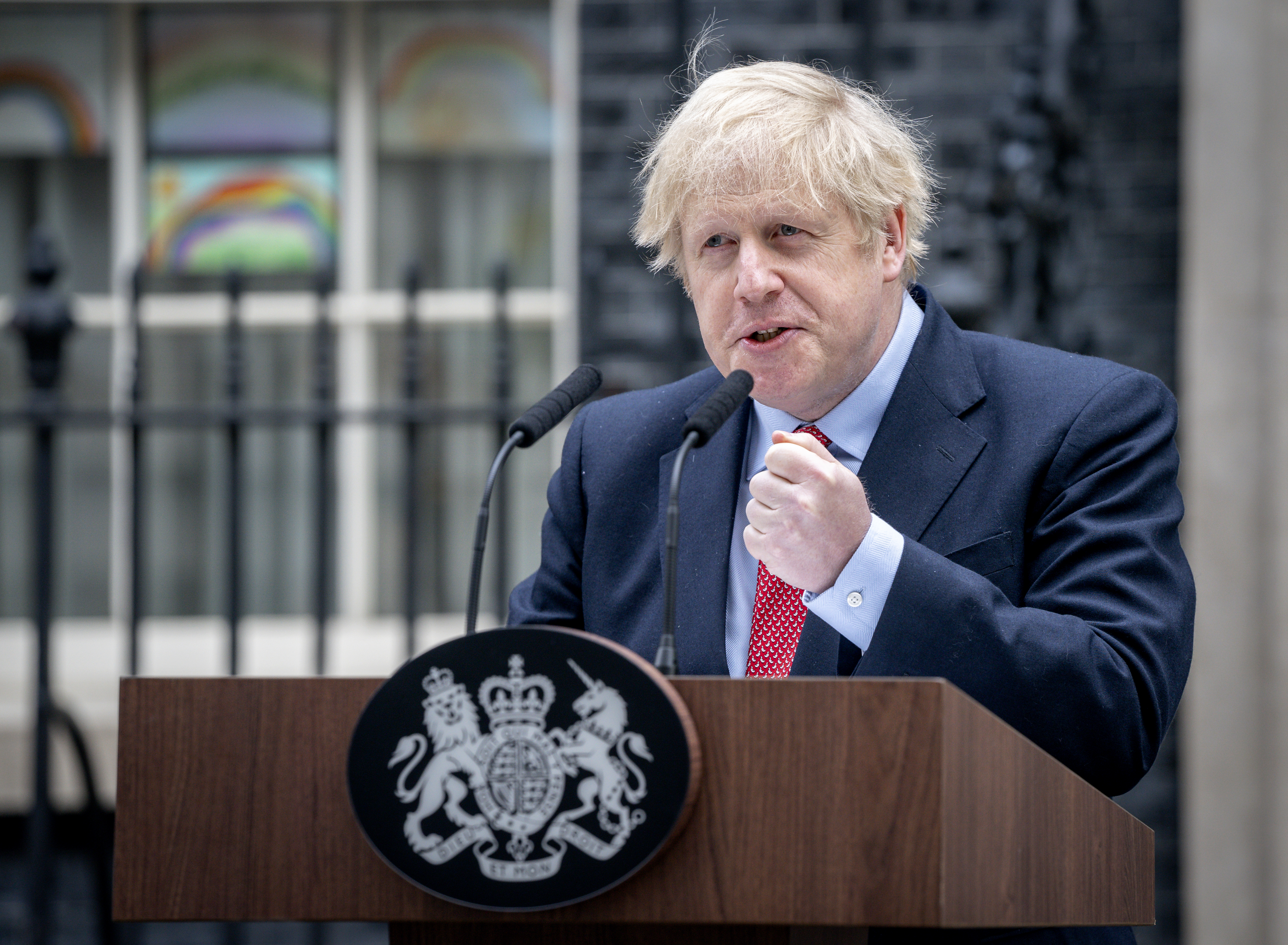
Johnson giving a speech in April 2020 after recovering from COVID-19

On 27 March, it was announced that Johnson had tested positive for COVID-19. On 5 April, he was admitted to a hospital. The next day, he was moved to the hospital's intensive care unit. Johnson left intensive care on 9 April, and left hospital three days later to recuperate at Chequers. After a fortnight at Chequers, he returned to Downing Street on 26 April. Johnson later said that he had been given emergency oxygen while in intensive care, and that doctors had made preparations in case he died.

A scandal in May 2020 involved Johnson's chief political advisor Dominic Cummings, who made a trip with his family to Durham during the March 2020 lockdown while experiencing COVID-19 symptoms. Both Cummings and Johnson rejected widespread calls that Cummings resign. Johnson's defence of Cummings and his refusal to sack him caused a widespread backlash. This resulted in a loss of confidence in the government and specifically its response to the pandemic, referred to as 'the Cummings effect' in The Lancet. Concerns were raised in the study that this could affect the public's compliance with pandemic restrictions.

The Johnson ministry was accused of cronyism in their assignment of contracts related to the pandemic response. Procurement of government contracts for key COVID-19 supplies became less transparent as a result of emergency measures bypassing the usual competitive tendering process. In October 2020 Johnson conceded that the UK's test and trace system and its specially developed contact tracing app, which had been criticised for their cost and operational issues, had caused "frustrations".

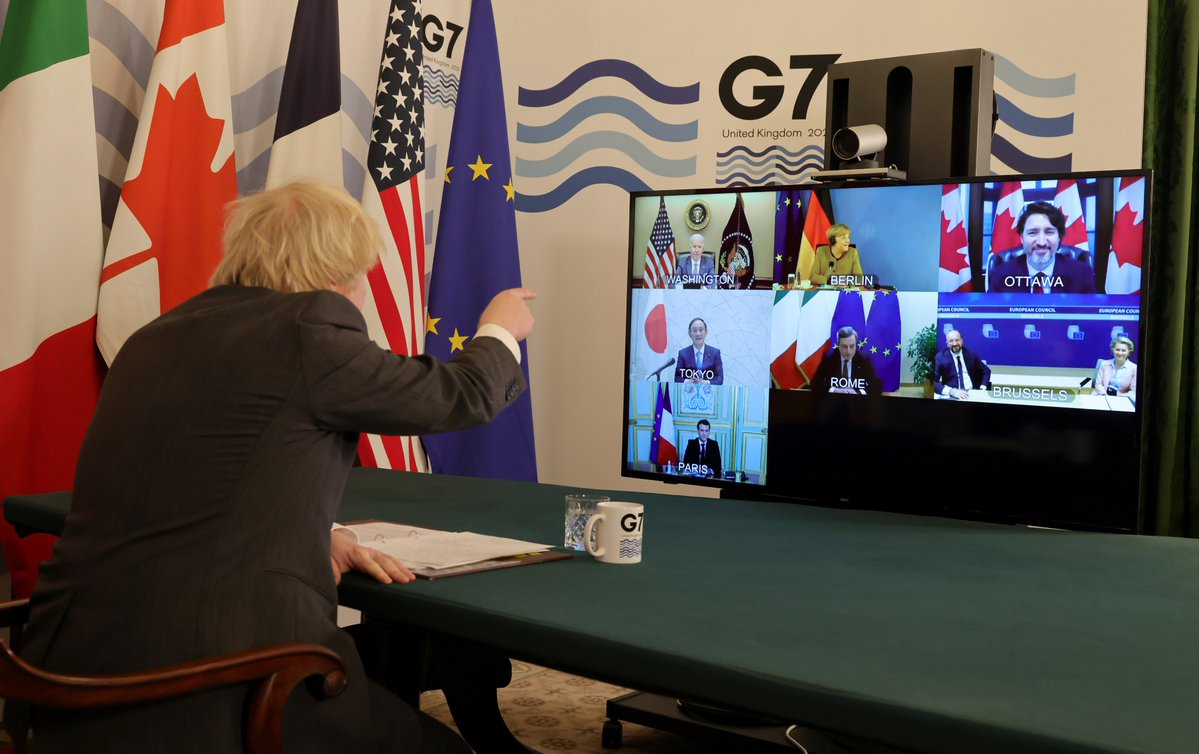
Johnson hosts virtual G7 meeting in February 2021.

Johnson reportedly resisted calls from SAGE and within the government to enact a second lockdown throughout September as COVID-19 infections rose. In April 2021 Johnson denied allegations he had said he would rather "let the bodies pile high in their thousands" on 30 October 2020. The government enacted a second national lockdown on 31 October. Throughout December 2020 COVID-19 cases across the UK rose significantly, straining emergency services and hospitals. In response, the government enacted further restrictions to large parts of southern and eastern England and on 21 December shortened a planned household mixing period over Christmas.

Britain began its COVID-19 vaccination programme in December 2020. Half of UK adults had received at least their first vaccine dose by 20 March 2021. A third lockdown for the whole of England was introduced on 6 January 2021. Record numbers of infections and daily deaths were recorded in the UK throughout January, and the government began exploring quarantine procedures on arrival. Johnson said he was "deeply sorry" and "take[s] full responsibility" as the UK passed 100,000 deaths from COVID-19, the first European country to do so, on 26 January.

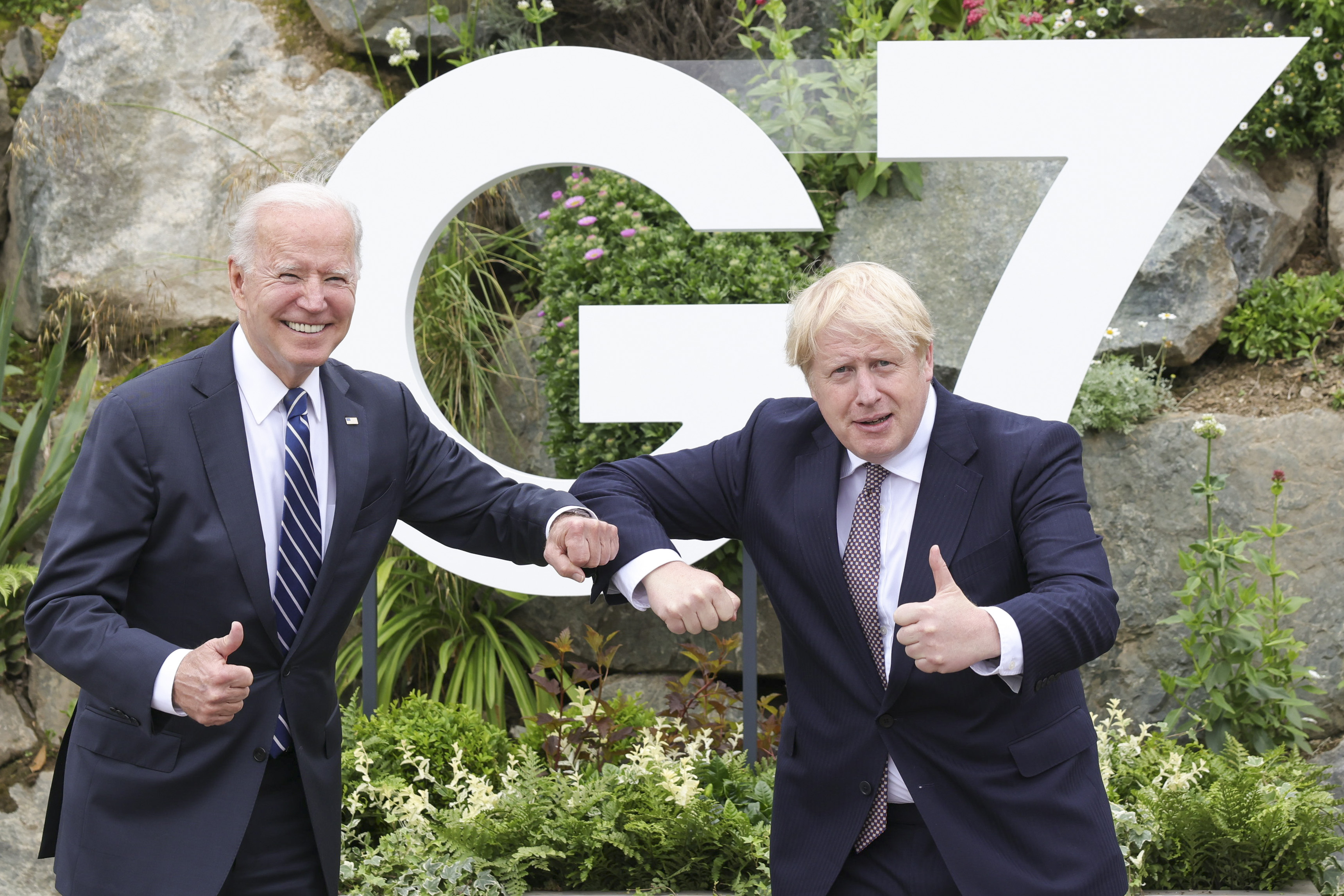
Johnson with US president Joe Biden at the G7 summit in Cornwall, 10 June 2021

In July 2021 Johnson announced that most generalised public health restrictions in England would be lifted and replaced by recommendations. This took place despite an increase in cases driven by the Delta variant. In September 2021 Johnson was pictured in a cabinet meeting, with "at least 30 people crammed shoulder-to-shoulder", without anyone wearing masks and with all windows apparently closed, contradicting government advice. Johnson was also photographed without a face mask during a visit to a hospital in November.

In December 2021 more stringent "Plan B" restrictions for England were put forward, a partial renewal of previous measures due to the increased incidence of the SARS-CoV-2 Omicron variant. These proposals included face coverings to be required in more public settings, guidance to work from home wherever possible, and requirements of COVID-19 passports to enter certain venues. The government experienced the largest rebellion of Conservative MPs during Johnson's premiership, in opposition to these measures.

==== Immigration ====
Total UK net migration 2019 to 2025, showing the Boriswave

In 2019, Johnson promised to reduce net migration to the United Kingdom (the number of people immigrating minus the number emigrating) below 250,000 per year by the next election. In 2021 net migration to the UK was 488,000, up from 184,000 in 2019 before the COVID-19 pandemic. Most of the migrants came from non-EU countries. As a result of Brexit, more EU nationals left the UK than arrived.

In 2021, Johnson's government launched a scheme for Hongkongers following introduction of the 2020 Hong Kong national security law, with more than 180,000 Hong Kong British National (Overseas) (BN(O)) status holders arriving in the UK or being granted in-country extension by March 2024.

Long-term net migration to the UK reached a record high of 764,000 in 2022, with immigration at 1.26 million and emigration at 493,000.

==== Legislative agenda ====
At the State Opening of Parliament on 11 May 2021, a range of proposed laws were announced, including the Dissolution and Calling of Parliament Bill, which would restore the royal prerogative to dissolve Parliament; a Higher Education (Freedom of Speech) Bill to combat deplatforming at universities; an Online Safety Bill that would impose a statutory duty of care on online companies and empower Ofcom to block particular websites; and an Animal Welfare (Sentience) Bill that would legally recognise animal sentience. Further laws would introduce mandatory voter identification at general elections, reform the national immigration system, and implement a levelling up policy to reduce imbalances between areas.

==== 2021 Downing Street refurbishment controversy ====
In April 2021 Cummings alleged that Johnson had arranged for donors to "secretly pay" for renovations on the private residence at 11 Downing Street. On 27 April Johnson asked the Cabinet Secretary, Simon Case, to hold a review about the refurbishment. On 28 April, the Electoral Commission announced it had opened a formal investigation. On the same day Johnson said that he had not broken any laws over the refurbishment and had met the requirements he was obliged to meet. During Prime Minister's Questions, the leader of the opposition, Keir Starmer, asked: "Who initially paid for the redecoration of his Downing Street flat?"; Johnson responded: "I paid for Downing Street's refurbishment personally."

On 28 May Lord Geidt published a report on the allegations which concluded that Johnson did not breach the Ministerial Code and that no conflict, or reasonably perceived conflict, of interest arose. However, Lord Geidt expressed that it was "unwise" for Johnson to have proceeded without "more rigorous regard for how this would be funded". The Electoral Commission reported on 9 December that it found that the Conservative Party had failed to follow the law in not accurately reporting donations to the party from Lord Brownlow and imposed a £17,800 fine on the party. The Herald said the commission's report outlined how, in March, all the money paid by Brownlow and his company had been reimbursed, as had the payments made by the Conservative Party and Cabinet Office. Downing Street had said at the time that the full cost of the works had been met personally by the prime minister.

==== Owen Paterson controversy ====
In November 2021 Johnson backed a motion to block the suspension of Owen Paterson, a Conservative MP found to have abused his position by the independent standards commissioner after undertaking paid lobbying. The motion called for the creation of a new Conservative-majority committee to examine reforms of the standards investigation process. Many Conservative MPs refused to support the motion, and 13 defied a three-line whip to vote against it. Following the announcement by opposition parties that they would boycott the new committee, and faced with a backlash in the media and from MPs of all parties, the government announced that a new vote would take place on whether Paterson should be suspended. Paterson announced his resignation as an MP the same day. A by-election in Paterson's former constituency of North Shropshire saw the Liberal Democrat candidate, Helen Morgan, overturn a Conservative majority of nearly 23,000, the seventh largest swing in United Kingdom by-election history.

==== Partygate scandal ====
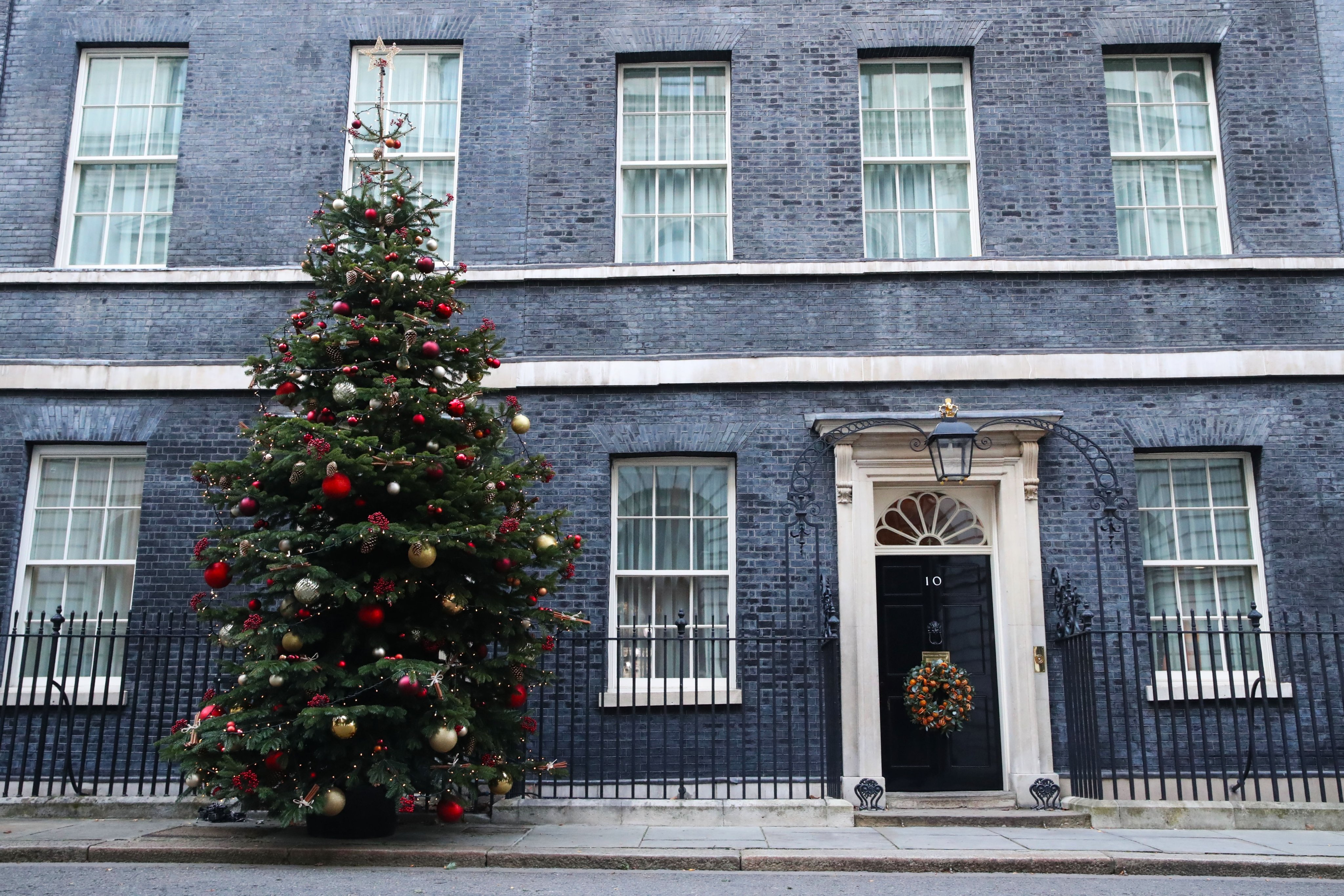
Downing Street, where some of the gatherings took place

In December 2021 reports emerged that social gatherings of government and Conservative Party staff in Downing Street had taken place ahead of Christmas 2020 against COVID-19 regulations. Johnson denied these allegations. Following a leaked video showing Downing Street staff joking about a "fictional party", at a press conference rehearsal recorded days after one alleged party took place, Johnson apologised for the contents of the video and suggested he had been misled but had now ordered an inquiry.

On 10 January 2022, ITV News reported that a planned party had taken place on 20 May 2020, during the first lockdown. ITV had obtained an email sent by principal private secretary Martin Reynolds to staff inviting them to "socially distanced drinks" in the garden of No. 10. At the time, people outdoors were not allowed to meet more than one person from outside their household. Two eyewitnesses later alleged that Johnson and Symonds attended, contradicting Johnson's insistence in December 2021 that there were "no parties".

On 12 January, Johnson apologised to MPs in the Commons for "attending an event in the Downing Street garden during the first lockdown", stating he believed it was "a work event". He said that MPs should await the outcome of the independent inquiry, led by senior civil servant Sue Gray, which he said "will report as soon as possible". There were calls across the House for Johnson to resign. One week later, Conservative former minister David Davis called for Johnson to resign, quoting Leo Amery calling on Neville Chamberlain to resign during the Norway Debate in 1940, and saying: "You have sat there too long for all the good you have done. In the name of God, go."

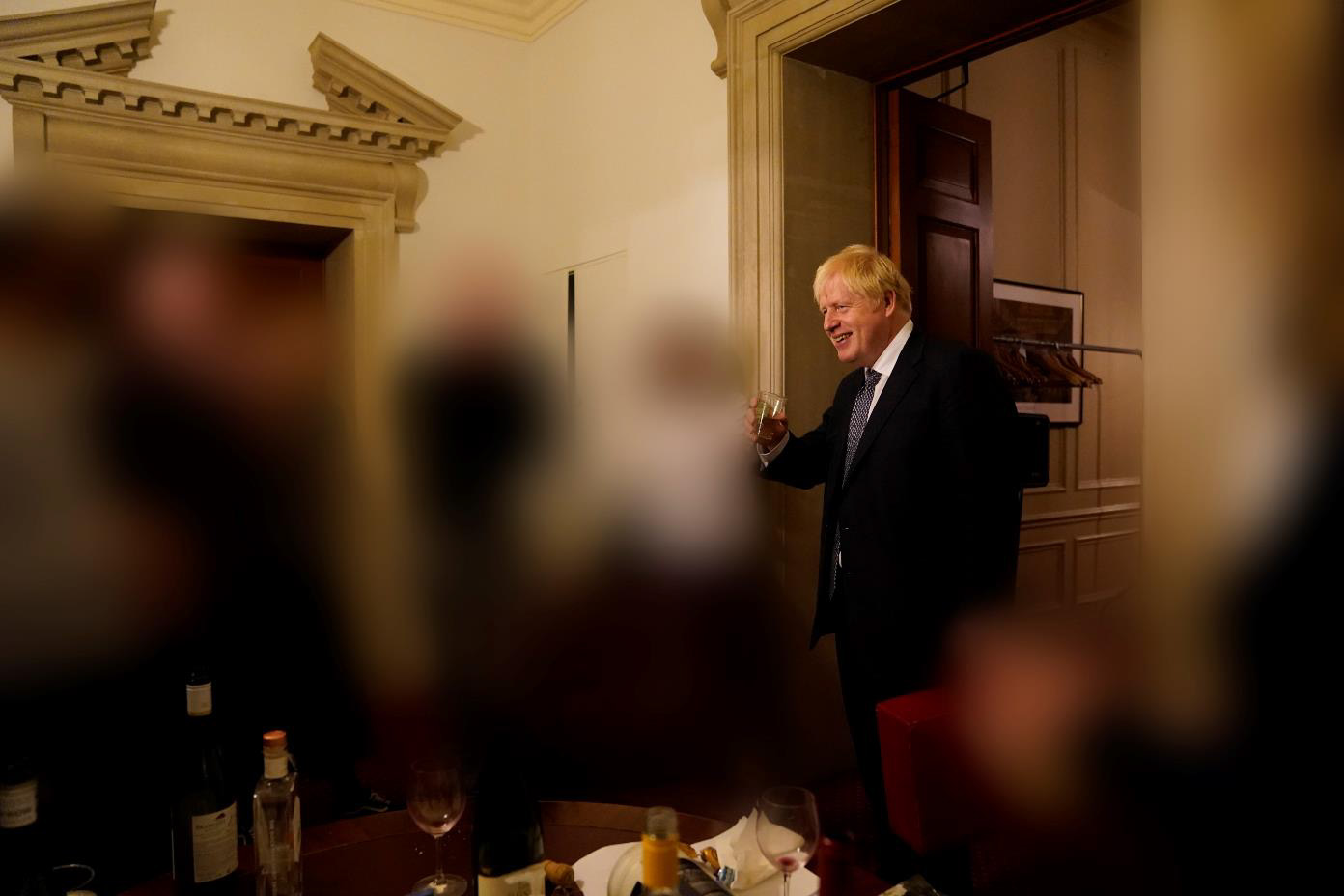
An image of Johnson at a social gathering, from Sue Gray's report into the partygate scandal

On 25 January, the Metropolitan Police announced that they were commencing investigations into the Downing Street Parties. An abbreviated version of the Sue Gray report into the controversy was released on 31 January, where Gray concluded there was a "failure of leadership" over the events that she had examined. The release of the full report was delayed pending the Metropolitan Police's investigation.

In April 2022, Johnson was issued a fixed penalty notice as police determined that he committed a criminal offence by breaching the COVID-19 lockdown regulations. Johnson therefore became the first prime minister in British history to have been sanctioned for breaking the law while in office.

According to Downing Street insiders, Johnson was involved in instigating a party on the occasion of Lee Cain leaving Number 10. What had begun as press office drinks became a party after Johnson arrived, gave a speech and poured drinks for staff. Labour's deputy leader, Angela Rayner said, "If the latest reports are true, it would mean that not only did the prime minister attend parties, but he had a hand in instigating at least one of them. He has deliberately misled the British people at every turn. The prime minister has demeaned his office." On 21 April, MPs voted to refer Johnson to the Parliamentary Privileges Committee to investigate whether he knowingly misled Parliament. Steve Baker said Johnson's "marvellous contrition... only lasted as long as it took to get out of the headmaster's study".

Following the May 2022 local elections, many leading Conservatives in areas where the Conservatives had done badly blamed Johnson and calling on Johnson to resign. On 6 June, Graham Brady announced that the threshold for a vote on Johnson's leadership had been passed; the vote was scheduled for later that same day.

On 3 March 2023, an interim report from the Commons Select Committee of Privileges said there was evidence that "strongly suggests" breaches of coronavirus regulations would have been "obvious" to Johnson. The report also said "There is evidence that those who were advising Mr Johnson about what to say to the press and in the House were themselves struggling to contend that some gatherings were within the rules". Johnson said none of the evidence showed he "knowingly" misled Parliament. The report stated that the Commons may have been misled on multiple occasions and Johnson "did not correct the statements [at the] earliest opportunity". The committee also stated that Johnson had "personal knowledge" over lockdown gatherings in No 10, which he could have disclosed.

==== Starmer slur controversy ====
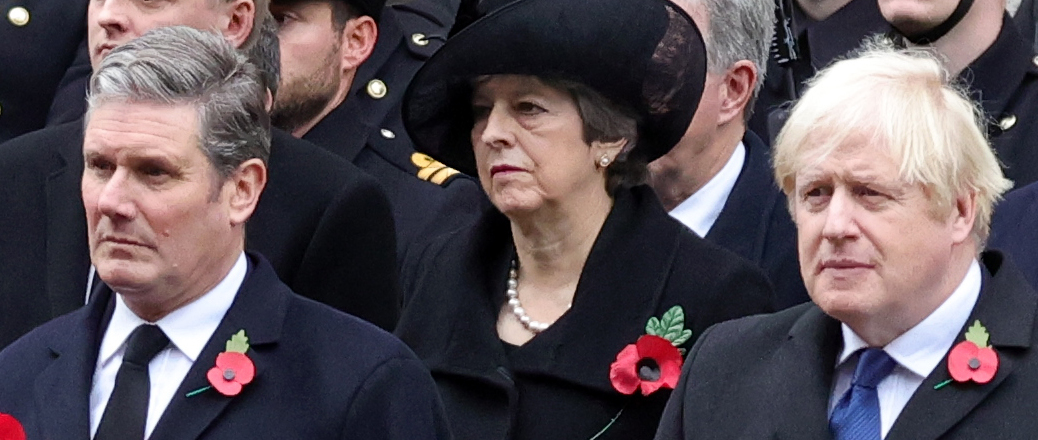
Johnson with Keir Starmer and former prime minister Theresa May, 14 November 2021

While speaking in the House of Commons in January 2022, Johnson falsely blamed Starmer for the non-prosecution of the serial sex offender Jimmy Savile when Starmer was Director of Public Prosecutions in the Crown Prosecution Service. Starmer was DPP in the years immediately prior to Savile's death but there is no evidence he was involved in the decision to not have him prosecuted. A few days later, Johnson defended his comments but conceded that Starmer "had nothing to do personally with those decisions" by the CPS not to investigate Savile.

==== Vote of confidence ====
In the week prior to and throughout the Platinum Jubilee of Elizabeth II in June 2022, it had been speculated that a vote of confidence in Johnson's leadership of the Conservative Party might soon occur. On 6 June 2022, the Conservative Party announced that Johnson would face a vote of confidence in his leadership of the party, after at least 54 Conservative MPs wrote no-confidence letters to Sir Graham Brady, the chairman of the 1922 Committee. Johnson won the vote, with 211 in favour and 148 against. The number of rebel MPs was larger than had been expected. The result was described by Keir Starmer as the "beginning of the end" for Johnson's premiership.

==== June 2022 by-elections ====
Following heavy Conservative defeats in the 23 June 2022 by-elections in Wakefield and Tiverton and Honiton, former party leader Michael Howard called for Johnson to resign, saying: "[Mr Johnson's] biggest asset has always been his ability to win votes but I'm afraid yesterday's results make it clear that he no longer has that ability."

Oliver Dowden, the Co-Chairman of the Conservative Party, resigned saying: "somebody must take responsibility". Johnson announced that he had no intention of changing or resigning; senior Conservatives accused him of increasingly "delusional" behaviour. On 26 June 2022 Johnson said: "At the moment I'm thinking actively about the third term and what could happen then, but I will review that when I get to it." He also claimed that he intended to stay as prime minister until the mid-2030s, although Number 10 later said that he had been joking.

==== Pincher scandal ====
Government Deputy Chief Whip Chris Pincher resigned on 30 June 2022, saying he had "drunk far too much" the night before at the Carlton Club in St James's, London, and having "embarrassed myself and other people". It was later alleged that he sexually assaulted two men, and he was suspended as an MP. On 3 July 2022 six new allegations against Pincher emerged, involving behaviour over a decade.

Johnson allegedly referred to Pincher as "handsy" and Cummings said Johnson joked about him being "Pincher by name, pincher by nature" in 2020, leading to calls for Johnson to explain how much he knew about Pincher's behaviour. Ministers initially said that Johnson was unaware of any specific complaints against Pincher when he was appointed as deputy chief whip. The BBC then reported, however, that an official complaint and subsequent investigation into Pincher, while he was at the Foreign Office (July 2019 to February 2020), had confirmed his misconduct, and that Johnson had been made aware at that time. Sir Simon McDonald, former Permanent Under-Secretary of State for Foreign Affairs, later said that the prime minister had been briefed "in person" about Pincher.

==== Mass resignations ====
On 5 July 2022, Sunak and Javid resigned within minutes of each other, followed over the next 24 hours by 11 other ministers, as well as Conservative MPs from parliamentary private secretary and other Government positions; other backbenchers also withdrew their support for Johnson. Many of the MPs stated that the Pincher affair had led them to change their minds on the suitability of Johnson to be prime minister. It was reported on 6 July that Johnson could face another confidence vote, with members of the 1922 Committee considering changing the rules as soon as that evening to allow this to happen. By 6 July, there had been a total of 31 resignations. As of May 2022, the government comprised 122 ministers.

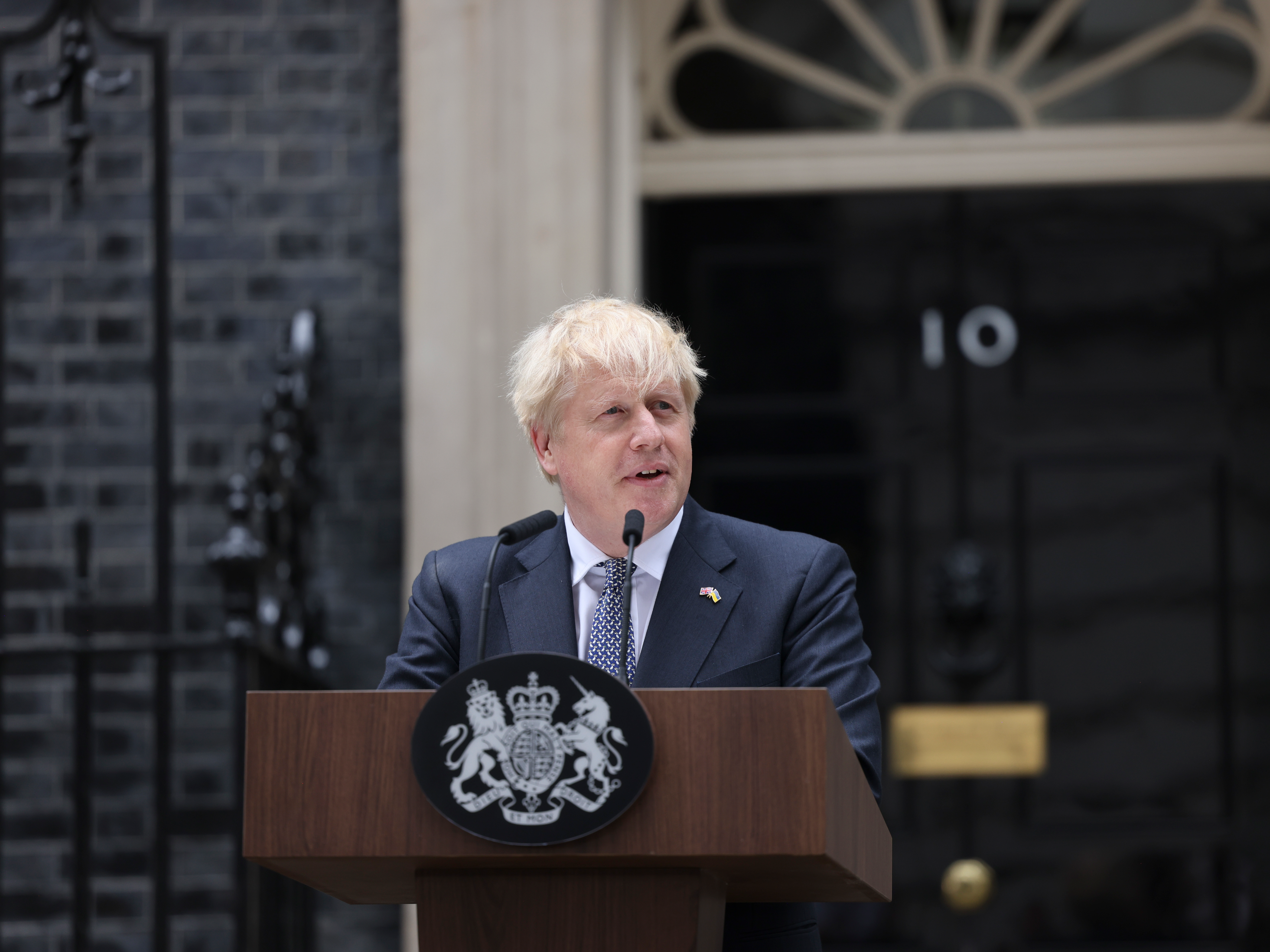
Johnson announcing his resignation on 7 July 2022

==== Announcement of resignation ====
By the morning of 7 July, the newly installed Chancellor of the Exchequer, Nadhim Zahawi, publicly stated his belief that Johnson should resign. Within hours, the BBC and other media reported Johnson's intention to resign. Johnson announced his resignation at 12.30 pm.

I know that there will be many who are relieved, but perhaps quite a few who will be disappointed. And I want you to know how sad I am to give up the best job in the world – but them's the breaks.

Upon reports of his resignation, the pound sterling temporarily strengthened in value, and UK stocks rose. He remained as prime minister until September, while the Conservative Party chose a new leader. On 5 September 2022, it was announced that Liz Truss had won the Conservative leadership election. She became prime minister the next day. During his farewell speech outside 10 Downing Street on 6 September 2022, Johnson referred to the Roman statesman Cincinnatus. Some commentators noted that, while, as Johnson said, Cincinnatus returned to his plough, he was also later recalled to power.

=== Environmental policies ===
In November 2020 Johnson announced a 10-point plan for a "green industrial revolution", to include ending the sale of petrol and diesel cars and vans by 2030, (Note: This was a reduction on the 2035 target set in February that year, which brought forward the previous deadline of 2040.) quadrupling the amount of offshore wind power capacity within a decade, funding emissions-cutting proposals, and spurning a proposed green post-COVID-19 recovery. In 2021 the Johnson government announced plans to cut carbon emissions by 78% by 2035.

Johnson announced that the UK would join the Global Methane Pledge to cut methane emissions by 30% by 2030 at the COP26 summit, which the UK hosted. Before the summit, representatives of Greenpeace and Friends of the Earth criticised Johnson's comments on plans to introduce "enforceable limits" on carbon emissions for other countries, which they accused of being unsubstantive, and his government faced criticism from environmental groups for cutting taxes on domestic air travel, given the environmental impact of aviation.

In April 2022, Johnson announced that eight more nuclear reactors would be built on existing nuclear power plant sites and called for an expansion in wind energy. Under these plans, up to 95% of the UK's electricity could come from low-carbon power sources by 2030.

=== Foreign policy ===
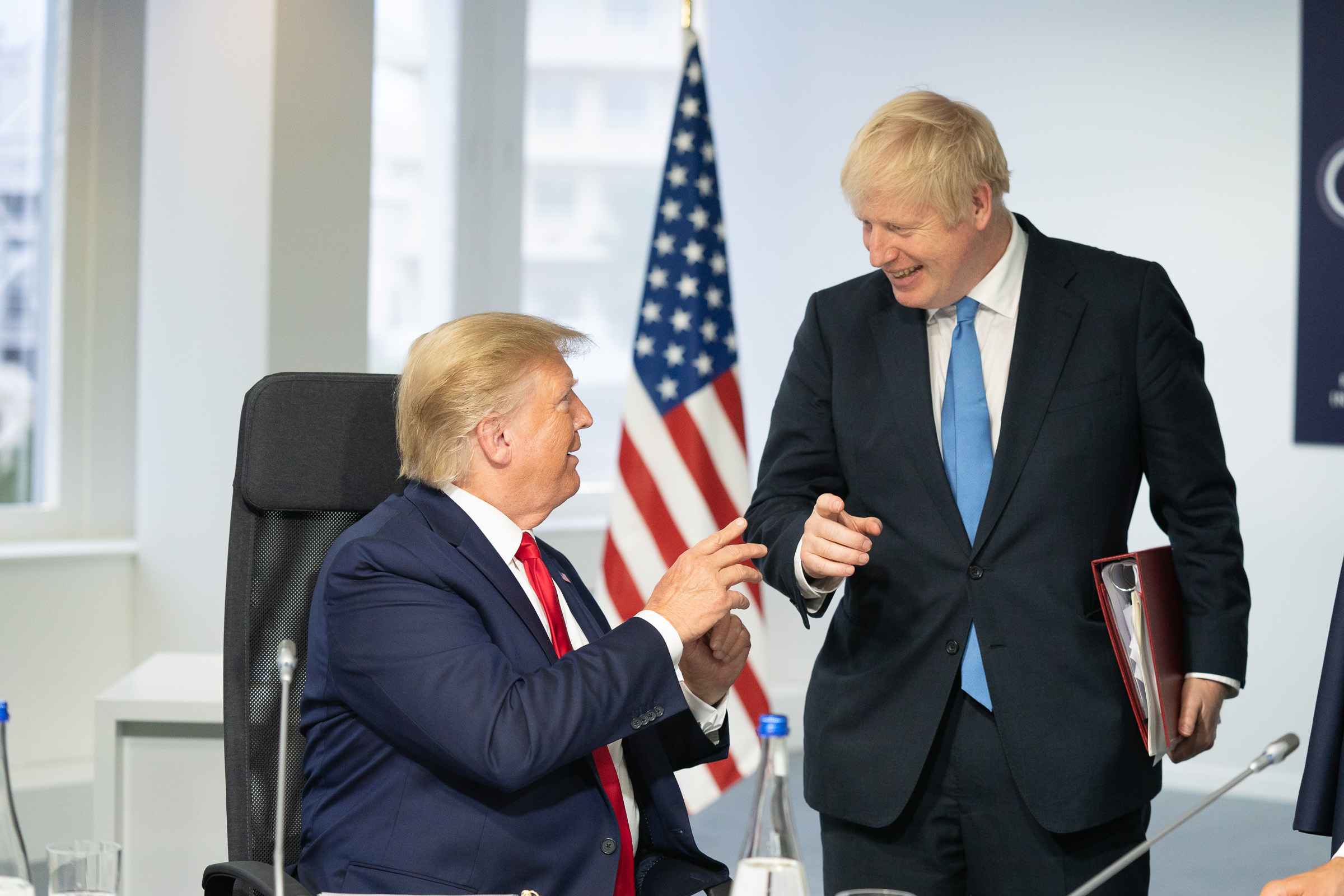
Johnson with US president Donald Trump at the G7 summit in Biarritz, 26 August 2019

Johnson supported the European Union–Mercosur Free Trade Agreement, which would form one of the world's largest free trade areas. Johnson's government placed importance on the "Special Relationship" with the United States. In 2022, his government introduced an asylum deal whereby people entering the UK illegally would be sent to Rwanda.

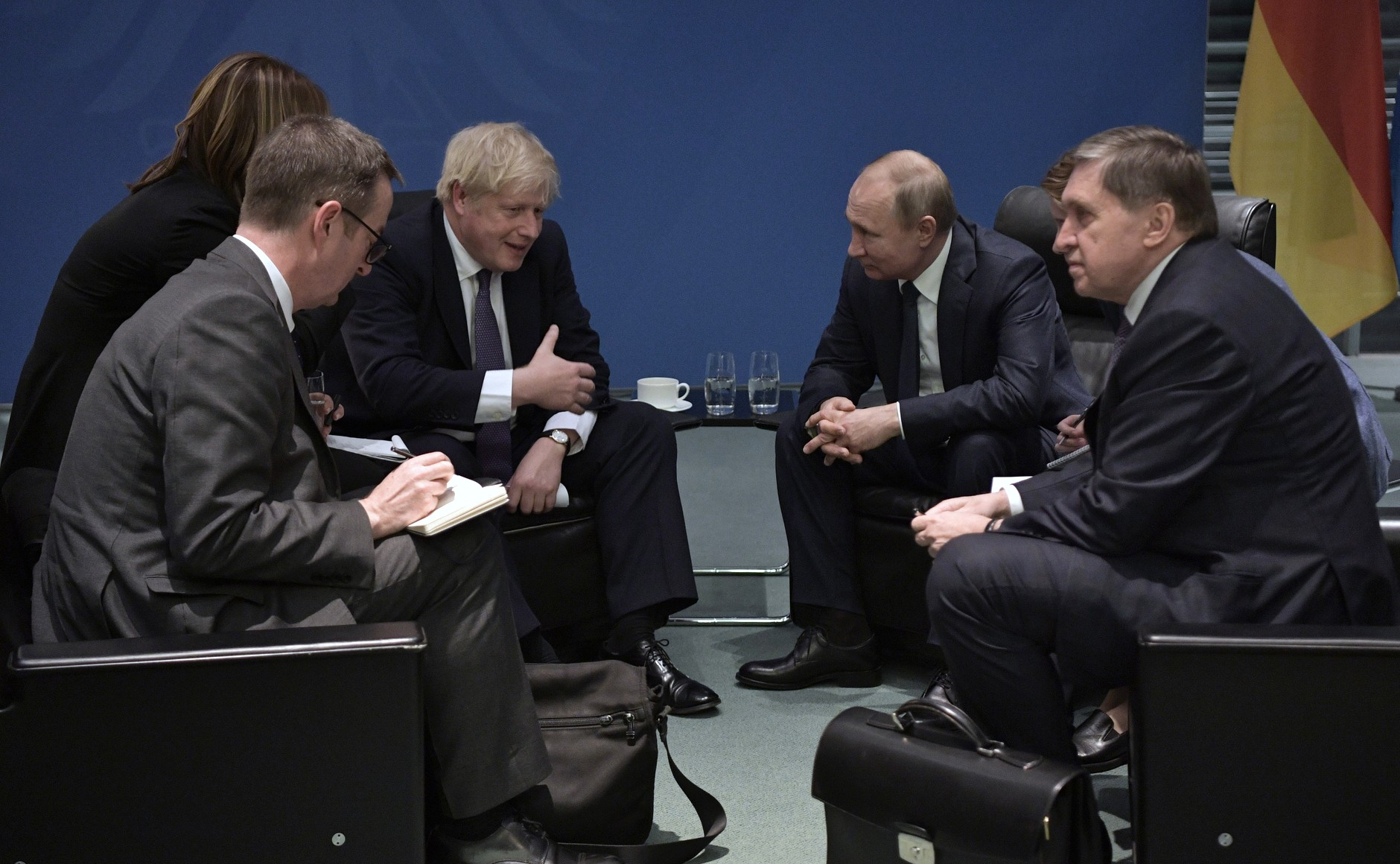
Johnson and Russian president Vladimir Putin at the Berlin Conference on Libya, 19 January 2020

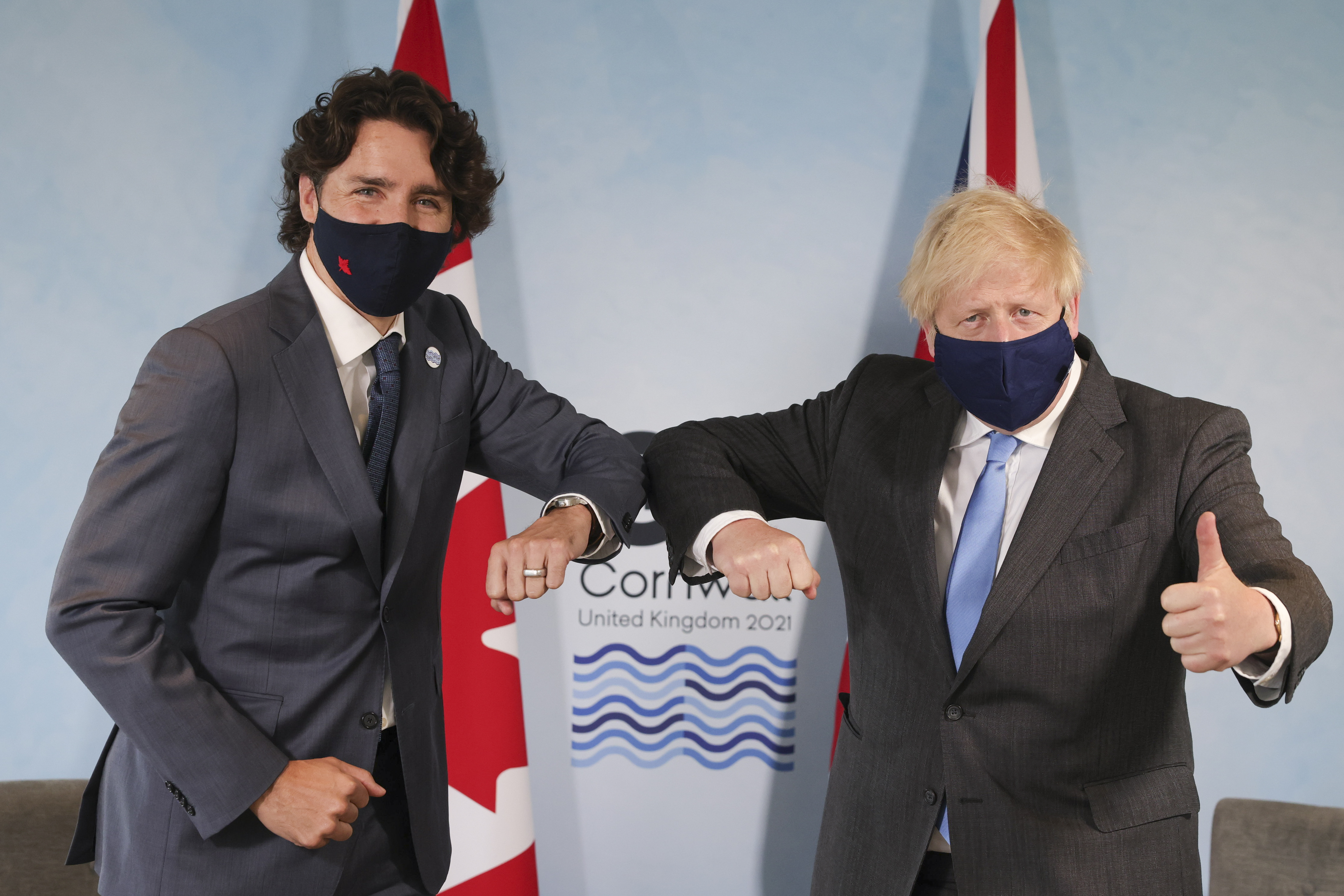
Johnson and Canadian Prime Minister Justin Trudeau at the 47th G7 summit in Cornwall, 11 June 2021

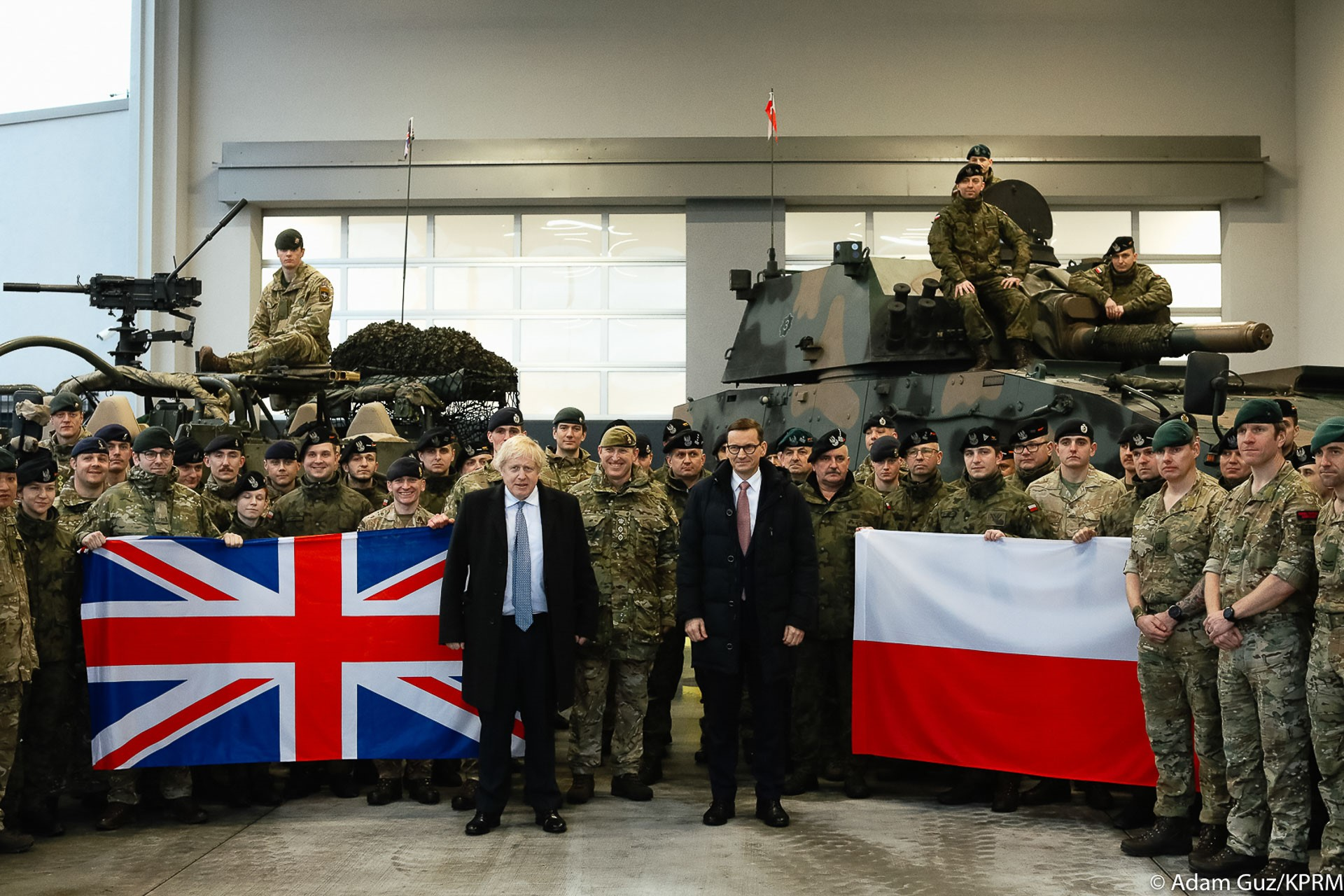
Johnson with Polish troops and Poland's PM Mateusz Morawiecki in Warsaw, 10 February 2022

==== Hong Kong and China ====
Johnson said in July 2019 that his government would be very "pro-China" in an interview with the Hong Kong broadcaster Phoenix TV. He voiced support for Chinese president Xi Jinping's infrastructure investment effort, the Belt and Road Initiative, and promised to keep the United Kingdom "the most open economy in Europe" for Chinese investment.

In June 2020 Johnson announced that if China were to continue pursuing the Hong Kong national security law, the UK would offer 350,000 Hong Kong residents who are British National (Overseas) passport holders, and 2.6 million other eligible individuals, the chance to move to the UK. China accused the UK of interfering in its internal affairs.

Johnson declined to describe the Chinese government's treatment of the Uyghur people as "genocide", despite use of the term by the United States. Johnson's government argued that genocide should be decided by the International Criminal Court. Nevertheless, he called what is happening to the Uyghurs in Xinjiang as "utterly abhorrent".

The UK joined the AUKUS defence pact with the United States and Australia in September 2021. The pact was denounced by China and caused a French backlash, as it usurped existing plans for Australia to procure French submarines.

On 29 October 2025, The Guardian newspaper revealed that Boris Johnson approved the controversial China's London super-embassy proposal in 2018, a project that remains in limbo seven years later.

==== Afghanistan ====
On 8 July 2021 the day after saying he was "apprehensive" about the future of Afghanistan following what was then the impending withdrawal of US troops, while announcing the near completion of British troop withdrawal from Afghanistan, Johnson expressed the view that there was "no military path to victory for the Taliban". Following the fall of Kabul to the Taliban, he blamed the United States for the crisis, saying that NATO alliance members "could not continue this US-led mission, a mission conceived and executed in support of America, without American logistics, without US air power and without American might".

==== UK–EU trade negotiation ====
Following the formal withdrawal from the European Union in January 2020, Johnson's government entered trade negotiations with the EU. Fisheries was a major topic of the negotiations. On 16 October 2020 Johnson said that the UK "must get ready" for no trade deal with the EU. It was announced on 24 December 2020 that the EU–UK Trade and Cooperation Agreement had been reached; it came into force formally on 1 May. A fisheries dispute between the UK and France occurred shortly afterwards. Introduction of new UK border checks were delayed until 2022 to minimise the disruption caused by the COVID-19 pandemic.

In May 2022, Johnson readied a draft that would unilaterally change parts of the Northern Ireland Protocol, citing issues with medical supplies and cuts in VAT. One of the thornier points of contention involves safety regulations for food and plants, where the British government is opposed to a closer alignment with existing EU regulations. The EU rebuffed the idea of changing the text of the treaty to accommodate the British. A unilateral override by the UK would be tantamount to a breach of the agreement. As Johnson sought a more conciliatory tone, sources within the government began to stress that the draft is designed to be an "insurance policy" and would take years to become law.

==== Russia and Ukraine ====
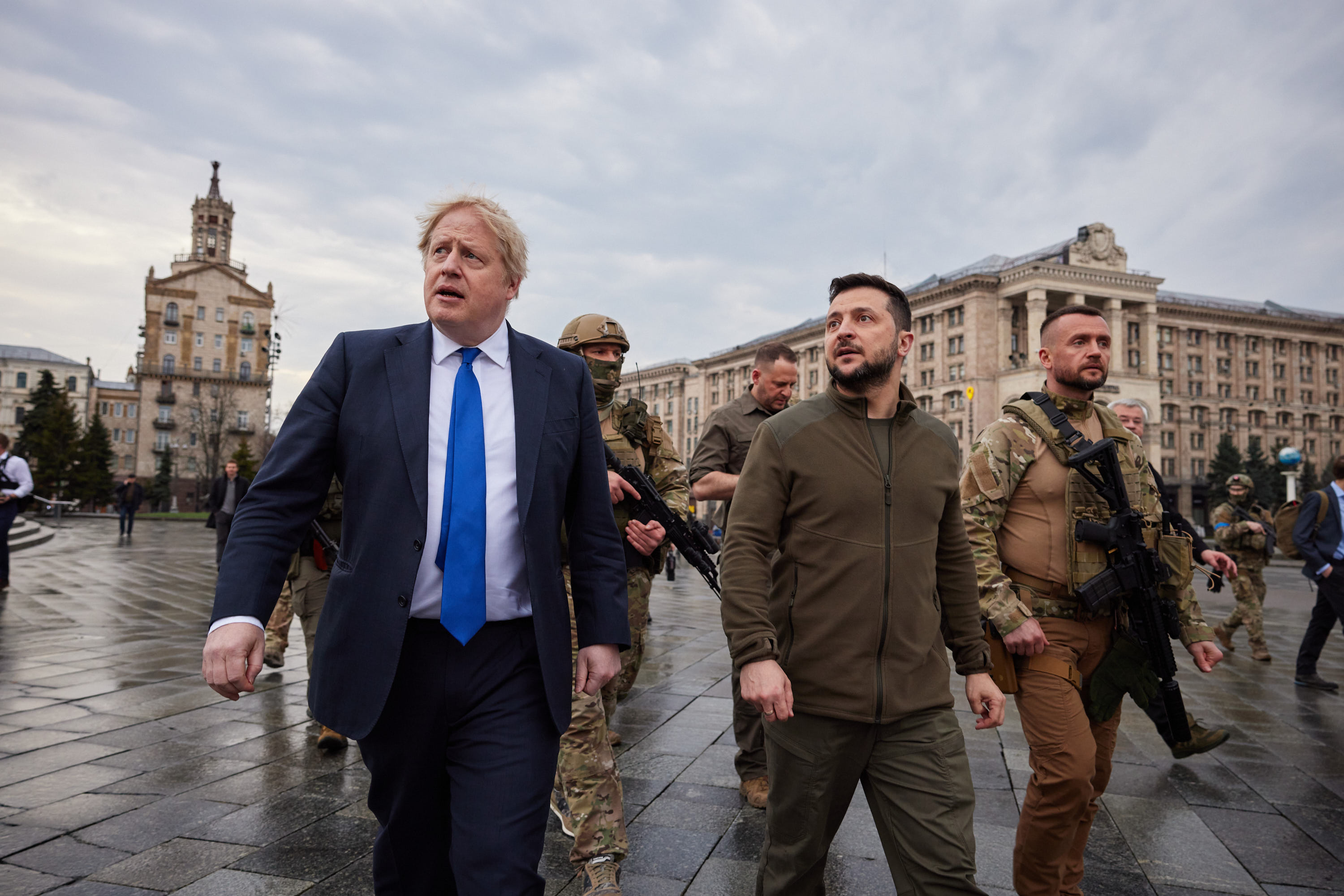
Johnson walks on a street of war-hit Kyiv along with President of Ukraine Volodymyr Zelenskyy on 10 April 2022.

In November 2021 Johnson warned that the European Union faces "a choice" between "sticking up for Ukraine" and approving the Nord Stream 2 natural gas pipeline from Russia to Europe.

During the prelude to the Russian invasion of Ukraine, Johnson's government warned the Russian Government not to invade Donbas. Johnson and Vladimir Putin agreed in a phone call to work towards a "peaceful resolution". On 1 February 2022, Johnson arrived in Kyiv on a diplomatic visit. He called the presence of the Russian Armed Forces near the Russia–Ukraine border "the biggest security crisis that Europe has faced for decades". The Kremlin denied that it wanted to attack Ukraine. On 20 February 2022, Johnson warned that Russia is planning the "biggest war in Europe since 1945" as Putin intends to invade and encircle Kyiv. On 21 February 2022, Johnson condemned Russia's diplomatic recognition of two self-proclaimed republics in Donbas.

On 24 February 2022, Johnson condemned the Russian invasion of Ukraine, and ensured the UK joined in international sanctions on Russian banks and oligarchs. He later announced the UK would phase out Russian oil by the end of 2022.

On 9 April 2022, Johnson travelled to Kyiv and met the President of Ukraine, Volodymyr Zelenskyy. On 16 April 2022, Russia's Ministry for Foreign Affairs banned Johnson and a number of senior British politicians from visiting Russia, saying that Britain aimed to isolate Russia politically and supply "the Kyiv regime with lethal weapons and coordinating similar efforts on the part of NATO".

Within Ukraine, Johnson is praised by many as a supporter of anti-Russian sanctions and military aid for Ukraine. On 3 May, Johnson virtually addressed the Ukrainian Parliament, becoming the first world leader to speak in Ukraine since the invasion. He pledged an extra £300m in military aid to Ukraine, praised Ukraine's resistance to Russia as its "finest hour" and said that the West had been "too slow to grasp what was actually happening" prior to Russia's invasion. In July 2022, Johnson warned that it would be a mistake to cease fire and freeze the conflict. In August 2022, Johnson blamed Vladimir Putin for the emerging global energy crisis.

== Post-premiership (2022–present) ==
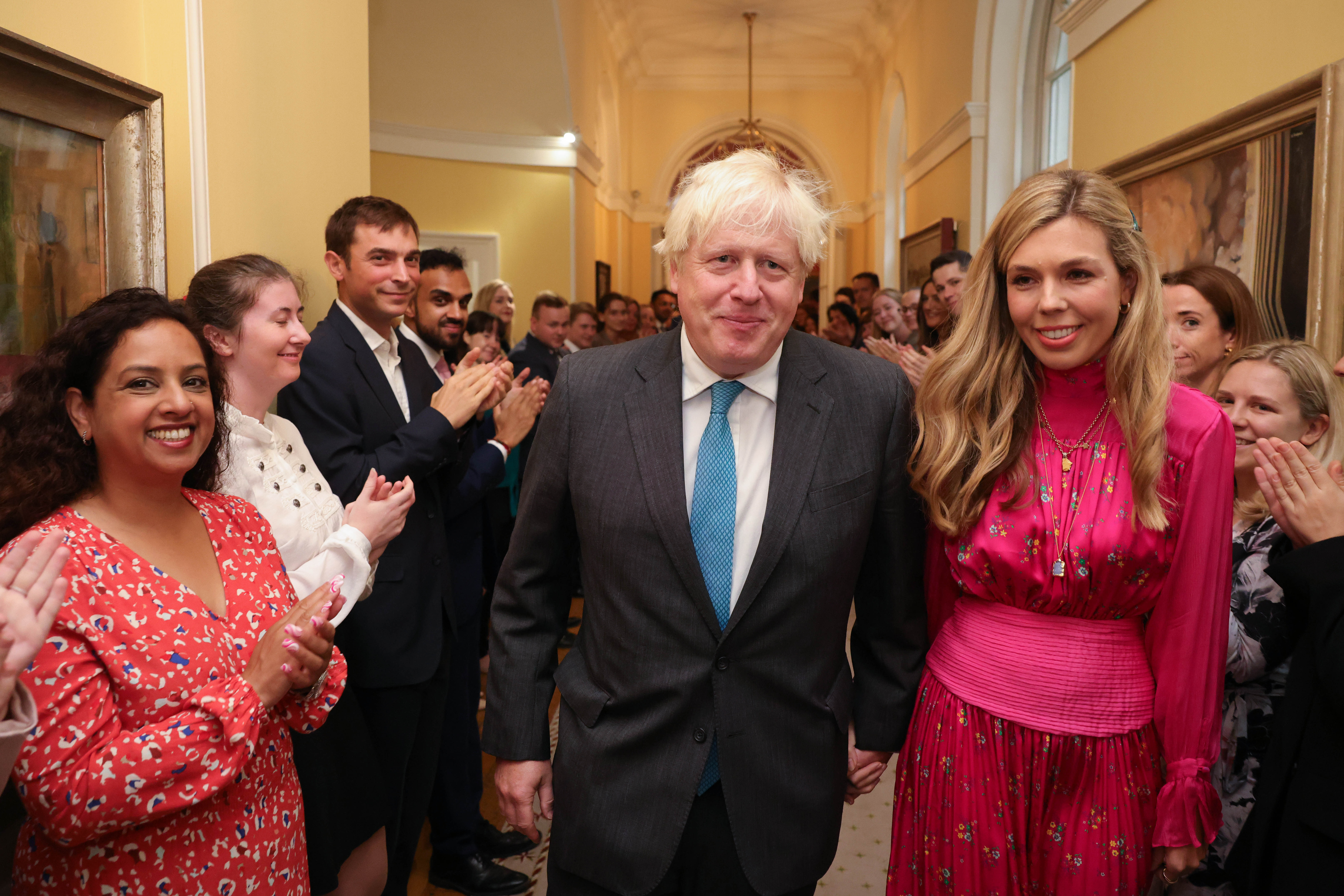
Johnson leaving Number 10 Downing Street on his last day as prime minister.

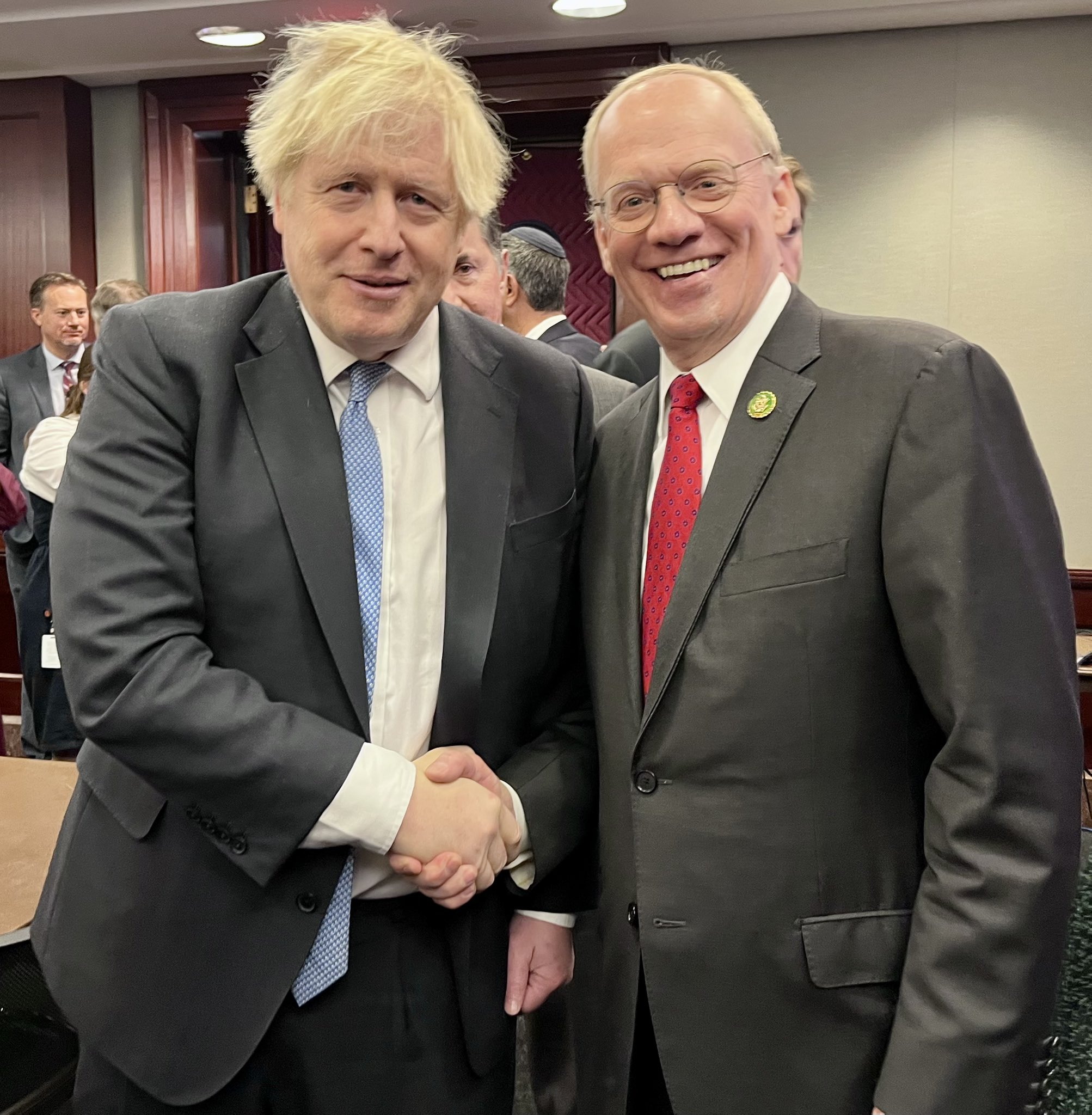
Johnson with US Representative John Rose in 2023

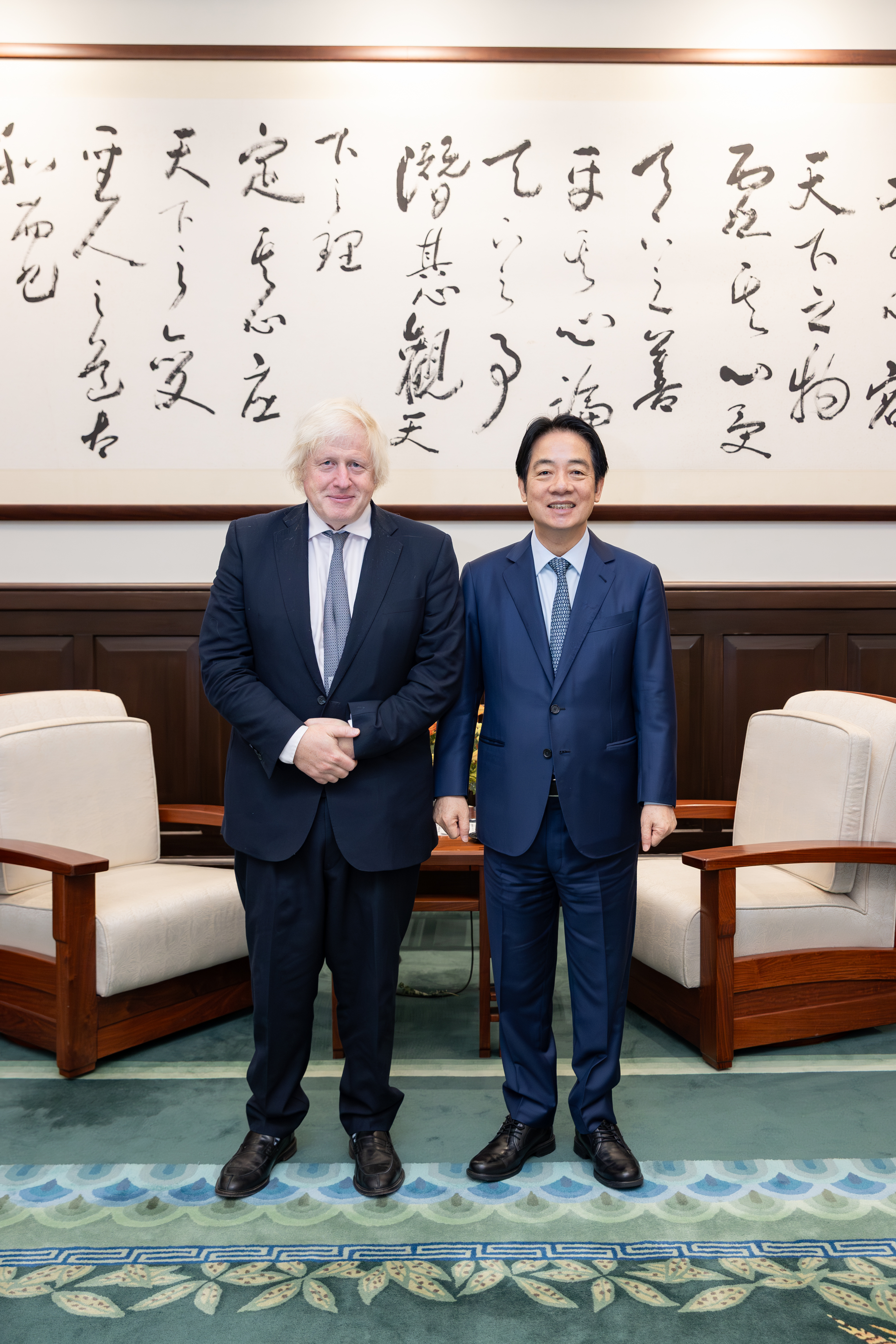
Johnson with William Lai, President of Taiwan, in 2025

After stepping down as party leader and prime minister, Johnson reverted to being an ordinary backbench MP. Following the death of Queen Elizabeth II, Johnson took part in Charles III's Accession Council, and many other funeral-related events. Johnson has given several speeches since the end of his premiership. In December 2022, it was reported that Johnson had made £1m from speeches since his resignation.

After Liz Truss announced her resignation as Conservative Party leader on 20 October 2022, Johnson sought support from MPs to run in the subsequent leadership election, and received support from several cabinet members. Three days later, he announced that he would not stand, stating that he would not have enough support from MPs to govern effectively.

After his former chancellor Rishi Sunak was elected unopposed as party leader and prime minister, Johnson congratulated him and urged Conservatives to give Sunak "their full and wholehearted support.

In May 2023, Johnson was referred to the police by the Cabinet Office regarding previously unknown potential breaches of COVID regulations between June 2020 and May 2021, to which Johnson's office issued a statement criticising the "unfounded suggestions" which "has all the hallmarks of yet another politically motivated stitch-up".

Johnson still faced a Privileges Committee investigation as to whether he deliberately misled Parliament over gatherings during Covid lockdowns. After receiving a draft of the investigation's report, he resigned from Parliament. The committee found that Johnson had deliberately misled MPs and therefore concluded that he had committed contempt of Parliament. The recommendation from the committee was to suspend the former Prime Minister for more than ten days. Johnson subsequently accused the committee of a witch hunt against him. Following Johnson's reaction to the report, including "impugning the committee", they added that they would have recommended a suspension of 90 days instead. His resignation triggered a by-election in his seat.

On 9 June 2023, the publication of his 2022 Prime Minister's Resignation Honours led to a public feud with Sunak. Johnson supporter Nadine Dorries announced that she was resigning as an MP due to not being included as a peer on the honours list. The same day, after receiving a confidential report from a committee of the House of Commons that was looking into whether he had lied to Parliament over lockdown-breaking gatherings, Johnson announced his resignation as MP. His resignation statement said he is "not alone in thinking that there is a witch-hunt under way, to take revenge for Brexit and ultimately to reverse the 2016 referendum result".

On 15 June, the Commons Privileges Committee published their report, which concluded that Johnson lied to and deliberately misled the House of Commons over Partygate, misled the Committee themselves during the hearing, and acted in contempt of the Committee itself through a "campaign of abuse and intimidation". The report noted that had Johnson still been an MP, the committee would have recommended he be suspended from Parliament for 90 days. The contents of the report represented a recommendation to the House of Commons, which accepted the report by 354 votes to seven.

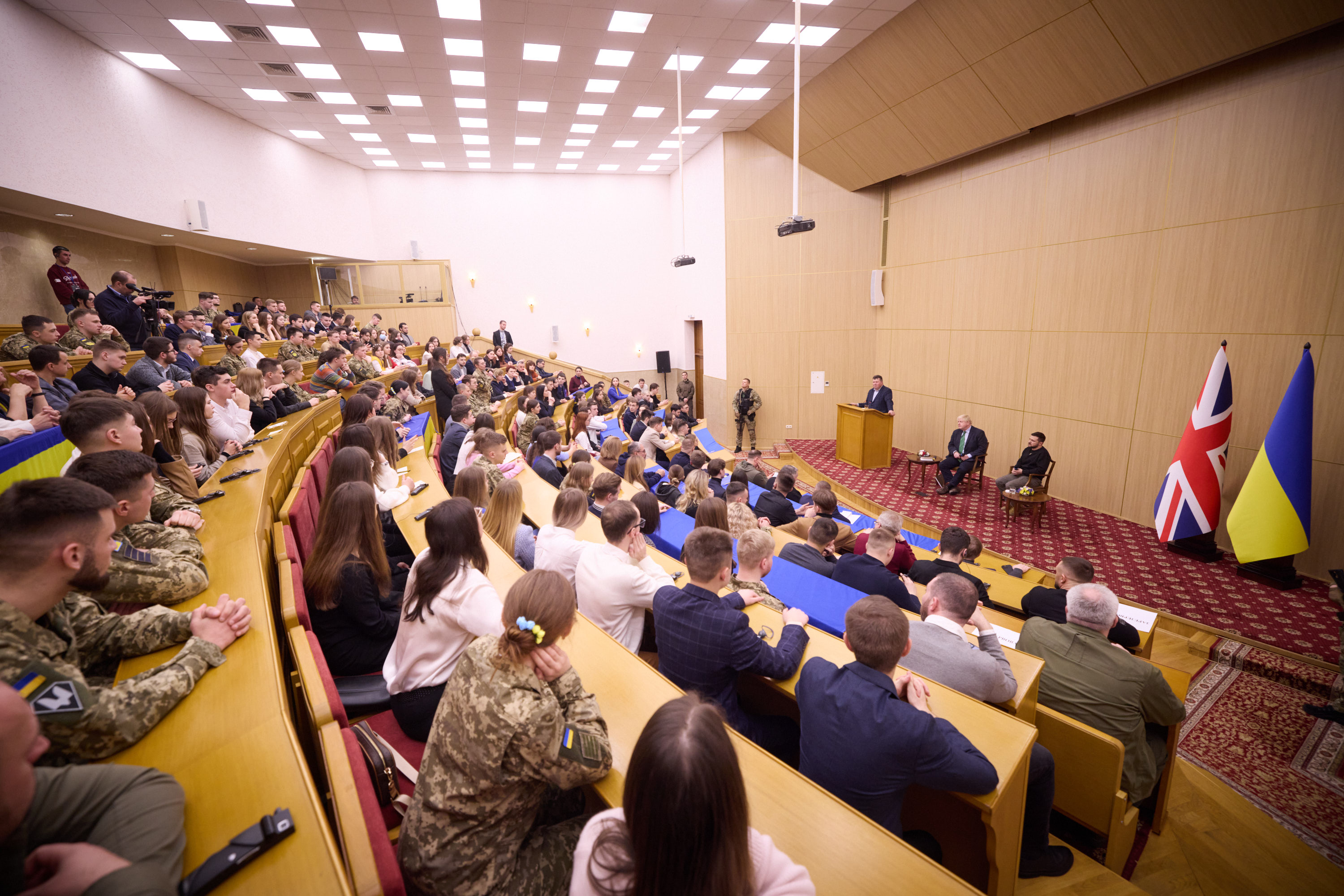
Johnson with students and lecturers of Taras Shevchenko National University of Kyiv, Ukraine, 22 January 2023

On 16 June, Johnson was unveiled as a new columnist for the Daily Mail. The news website Politico Europe reported that Johnson would be paid a "very-high six-figure sum". Johnson reportedly informed the Advisory Committee on Business Appointments half an hour before the columnist assignment was publicly announced. The committee ruled that Johnson committed a "clear breach" of the rules since he had not sought its advice on the matter within an appropriate timeframe.

In October 2023, Johnson announced he would join the television channel GB News as a commentator and programme maker for the next general election and US presidential election.

Johnson condemned Hamas' attack on Israel, saying "there can be no moral equivalence between the terrorism of Hamas and the actions of the Israeli Defense Forces". He rejected calls for a ceasefire in the Gaza Strip during the Gaza war, and criticised pro-Palestinian protests in the UK. On 5 November 2023, Johnson visited Israel to express solidarity. In February 2024, Johnson had a private meeting with the president of Venezuela, Nicolás Maduro.

On 2 May 2024 Johnson was turned away from his polling station for the Thames Valley Police and Crime Commissioner, after forgetting to bring valid photographic identification, a requirement of the Elections Act, which Johnson introduced while in office. When he arrived he had nothing to prove his identity except the sleeve of his copy of Prospect magazine, on which his name and address had been printed. He said that when he returned a few minutes later, with his driving licence, he was then able to vote. During the 2024 general election, Johnson campaigned for the Conservatives, who lost the election in a landslide to Labour.

Johnson's memoir Unleashed was released in October 2024.

In 2025, following Keir Starmer's decision to recognise a Palestinian state, Johnson said the move was "ridiculous" and aimed for political benefit among voters as well as motivated by inner party politics. Johnson also said that a Palestinian state should not be recognised because it has no clearly defined borders and its government is unable to control its borders as well as being ruled by Hamas, which Johnson described as "fascist".

In September 2026, Johnson attended the Yalta European Strategy, an international conference in Kyiv, Ukraine along with several European national security advisors including Jonathan Powell. On their return journey, by train to the Polish border, the following locomotive was targeted by Russian drones, on the same line that they had earlier travelled. Johnson, writing on X described Putin's attack, as "the kind of random and senseless attack Ukrainians are enduring every day - even on civilian railways".

== Political positions and ideology ==
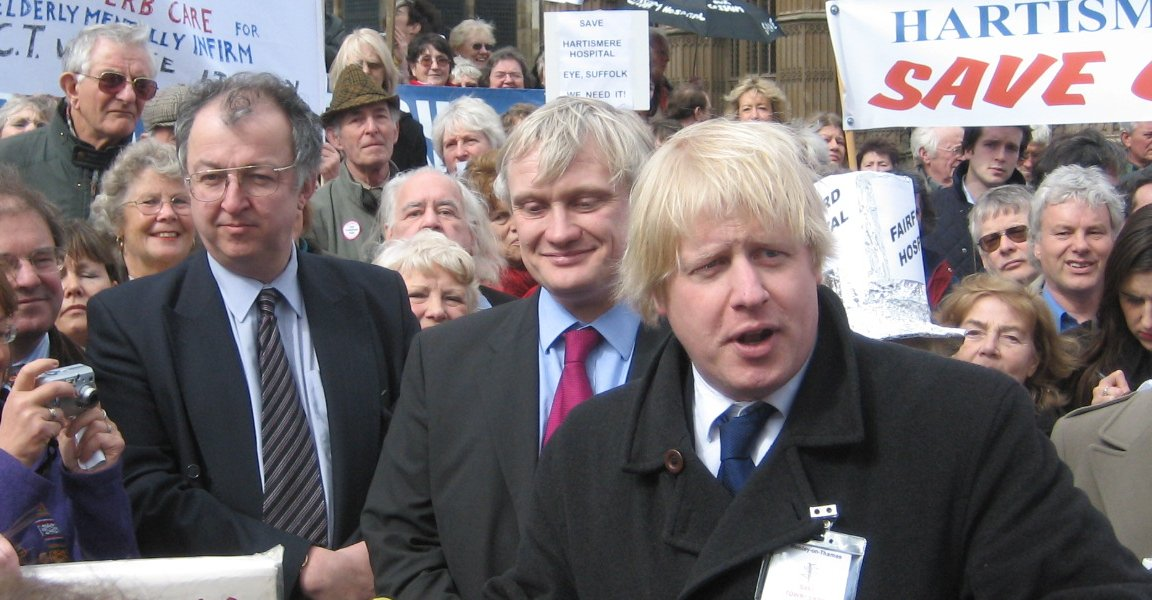
Johnson at a demonstration against hospital closures with Liberal Democrat MP John Hemming (left) and Conservative MP Graham Stuart (centre) in March 2006

[I am] free-market, tolerant, broadly libertarian (though perhaps not ultra-libertarian), inclined to see the merit of traditions, anti-regulation, pro-immigrant, pro-standing on your own two feet, pro-alcohol, pro-hunting, pro-motorist and ready to defend to the death the right of Glenn Hoddle to believe in reincarnation.

— Boris Johnson, 2011

Ideologically, Johnson has been described as a "One-Nation Tory". Political scientists have described Johnson's political positions as ambiguous and contradictory, encompassing nativist, authoritarian and free market tendencies on the one hand, and one-nation liberal conservatism on the other. Some scholars have questioned Johnson's commitment to one-nation conservativism, instead characterising his ideology as flexible and populist. Purnell stated that Johnson regularly changed his opinion on political issues, commenting on what she perceived to be "an ideological emptiness beneath the staunch Tory exterior".

During his tenure as mayor, Johnson gained a reputation as "a liberal, centre-ground politician", according to Business Insider. In 2012, the political scientist Tony Travers described Johnson as "a fairly classic—that is, small-state—mildly eurosceptic Conservative" who also embraced "modern social liberalism". The Guardian stated that while mayor, Johnson blended economic and social liberalism, with The Economist saying that in doing so Johnson "transcends his Tory identity" and adopts a more libertarian perspective. According to political scientist Richard Hayton, Johnson's premiership was about Brexit, which served as a "national cause". Johnson evoked the discourse of popular sovereignty and anti-establishment populism to portray Parliament as seeking to "sabotage" Brexit, and in doing so, presented himself "as the true representative of 'the people'".

Scholars of comparative politics have drawn comparisons between Johnson and other populist leaders such as Donald Trump and Viktor Orban. Some commentators have likened Johnson's political style to Trumpism, although others have argued that Johnson's stance on matters such as social policy, immigration and free trade is liberal. Johnson biographer Gimson wrote that Johnson is economically and socially "a genuine liberal", although he retains a "Tory element" through his "love of existing institutions, and a recognition of the inevitability of hierarchy". In 2019, reacting to reports in The Sun, that Johnson had told cabinet colleagues he was "basically a Brexity Hezza", former deputy leader of the Conservative Party Michael Heseltine wrote: "I fear that any traces of liberal conservatism that still exist within the prime minister have long since been captured by the rightwing, foreigner-bashing, inward-looking view of the world that has come to characterise his fellow Brexiters."

=== Environment ===
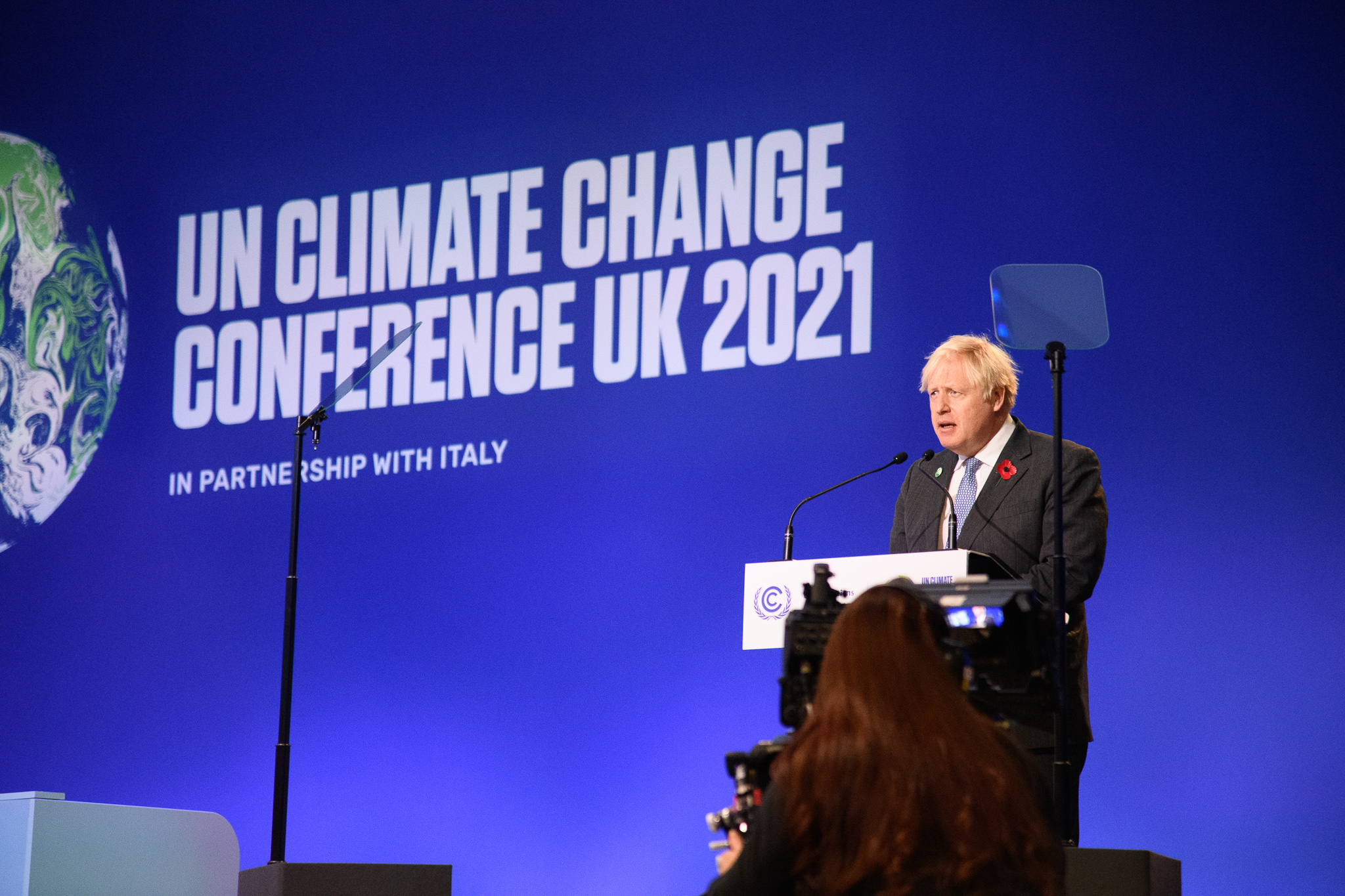
Johnson spoke about climate action at the COP26 climate summit in Glasgow on 1 November 2021.

Johnson initially expressed climate sceptical views in several newspaper columns. As Mayor of London from 2008 to 2016, Boris Johnson initiated several tree-planting programs to enhance the city's green spaces. His flagship pledge was to plant 10,000 street trees by 2012.

In 2019 and 2020 Johnson expressed support for the UK to have "net-zero" greenhouse gas emissions by 2050 and spoke about increasing ambition for mitigating climate change through carbon capture and storage and a renewable energy transition. During the 2021 United Nations Climate Change Conference, Johnson called for greater efforts towards climate change mitigation, and welcomed the prospect of coal phase-out.

=== Immigration and the European Union ===
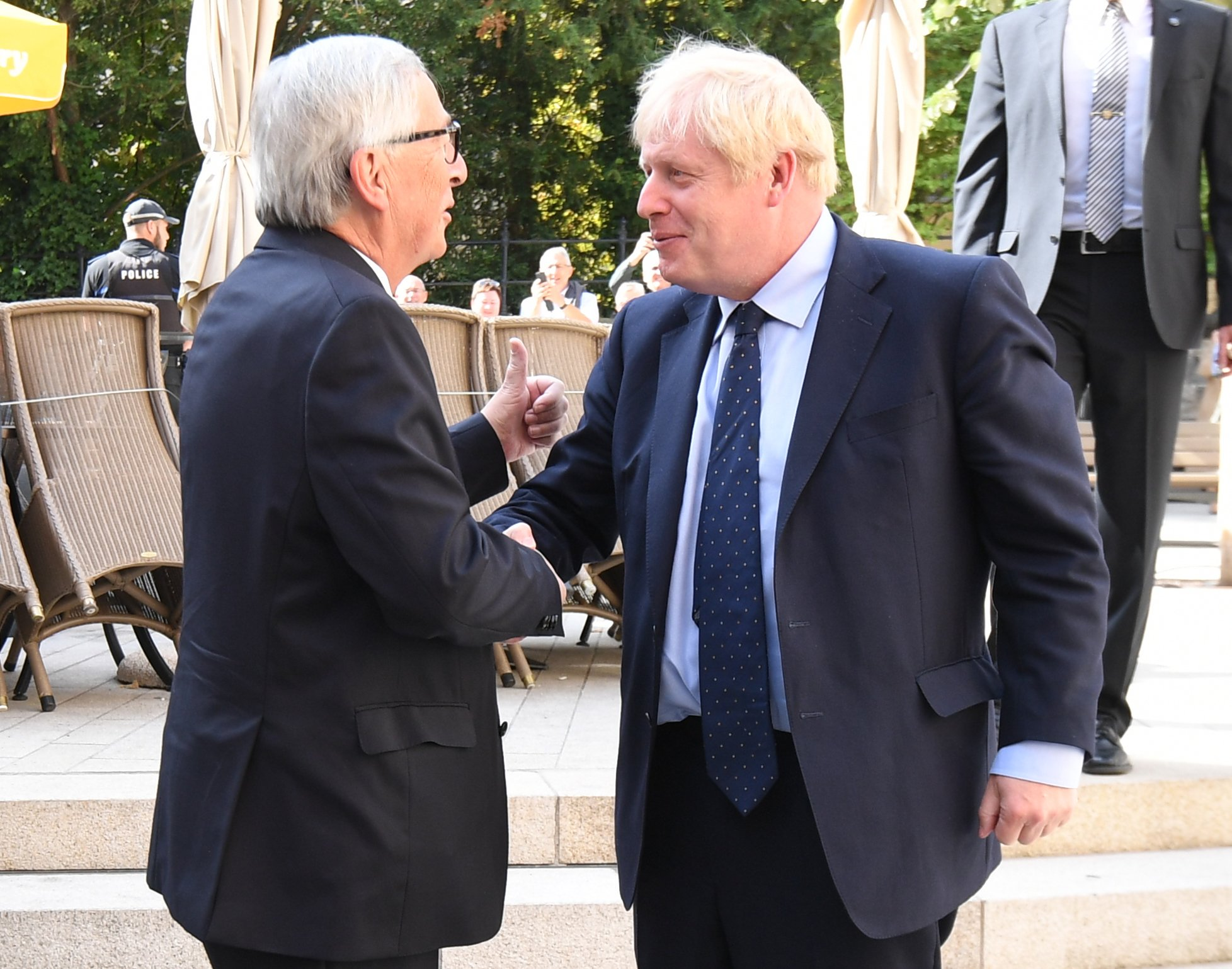
Johnson with EU Commission president Jean-Claude Juncker, 16 September 2019

Purnell believed it was the influence of Johnson's maternal family that led to him developing "a genuine abhorrence of racial discrimination". In 2003, Johnson said, "I am not by any means an ultra-Eurosceptic. In some ways, I am a bit of a fan of the European Union. If we did not have one, we would invent something like it." As mayor, Johnson was known as a supporter of immigration. From 2009, he advocated a referendum on Britain's EU membership.

In 2018, during Brexit negotiations, Johnson called for Britain to leave the Single Market and advocated a more liberal approach to immigration than that of Prime Minister May. He stated many people believed that Britain's EU membership had led to the suppression of British wages and said the EU was intent on creating a "superstate" that would seek to rob Britain of its sovereignty. In 2019, Johnson said he would take Britain out of the EU on 31 October whether there was a trade deal in place or not. Johnson also stated his opposition to a referendum on the Brexit withdrawal agreement.

On 19 August 2019, Johnson wrote a letter to the EU asking for the removal of the "backstop" accord. The president of the European Council, Donald Tusk, rejected the proposal. On 26 August 2019, Johnson said that Britain would not pay £39 billion for the withdrawal agreement were the UK to leave without a deal. The European Parliament Brexit coordinator Guy Verhofstadt said there would be no further negotiation unless the UK agreed to pay the entire sum.

=== Unionism and devolution ===
Johnson described himself as a "fervent and passionate unionist". He proposed building an Irish Sea Bridge, but he later scrapped this initiative. The devolved administrations have criticised the Internal Market Bill for its re-centralisation of control over commerce.

== Public image ==
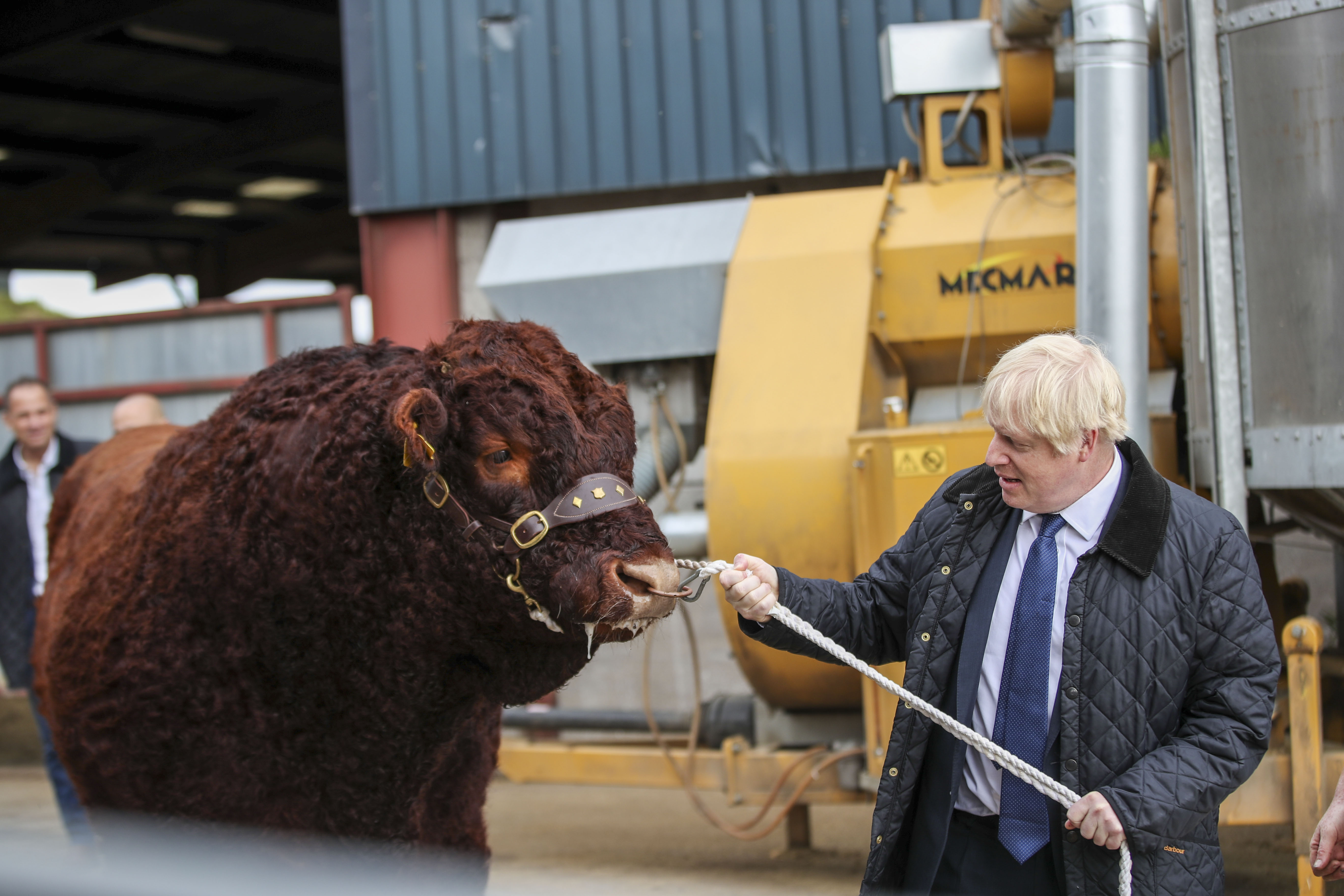
Johnson visiting a cattle farm in Aberdeen in 2019

Johnson has said that "humour is a utensil that you can use to sugar the pill and to get important points across". He is said to have a genuine desire to be liked. Johnson has been described as having a light-hearted and charming persona; many biographers and commentators suggest he has put significant effort into developing this version of himself. He has also been described as heavily focused on his own interests, with an often vitriolic or irresponsible way of conducting himself in private.

Johnson has been described as a divisive, controversial figure in British politics. Supporters have praised him as witty and entertaining. Johnson has been accused of lying or making misleading statements throughout his career, and has been compared to US president Donald Trump. He has been considered a figure with broad appeal outside of the usual Conservative support base. Johnson's premiership has been described by historians as the most controversial and scandal-affected since that of David Lloyd George about a century earlier.

== Personal life ==
Since Johnson was born in New York City to British parents, he held British-American dual citizenship. In 2015, he agreed to pay capital gains tax to the US tax authorities on a property that he inherited in the UK. He renounced his US citizenship the following year. Johnson has knowledge of French, Italian, German, Spanish, Latin and Ancient Greek, frequently making classical allusions in his newspaper columns and his speeches.

Sonia Purnell wrote in 2011 that Johnson was a "highly evasive figure" regarding his personal life, who remained detached from others and who had few intimate friends. Among friends and family, Johnson is more commonly known as Al (short for his forename Alexander), rather than Boris.

In 2007, Johnson said he had smoked cannabis before he went to university. He has also said he had used cocaine. Johnson cycles, plays tennis and does pilates, and returned to road running in 2023. He was considered obese in 2018 and overweight in 2020, and has spoken of making efforts to lose weight.

Johnson previously owned a £1.3 million buy-to-let townhouse in Camberwell, south London. According to HM Land Registry documents, he bought the four-bedroom property with his then-girlfriend Carrie Symonds in July 2019. The register of MPs' interests states that Johnson had a rental income of at least £10,000 a year. In 2023, Johnson and Symonds bought Brightwell Manor in Brightwell-cum-Sotwell, Oxfordshire.

=== Religion ===
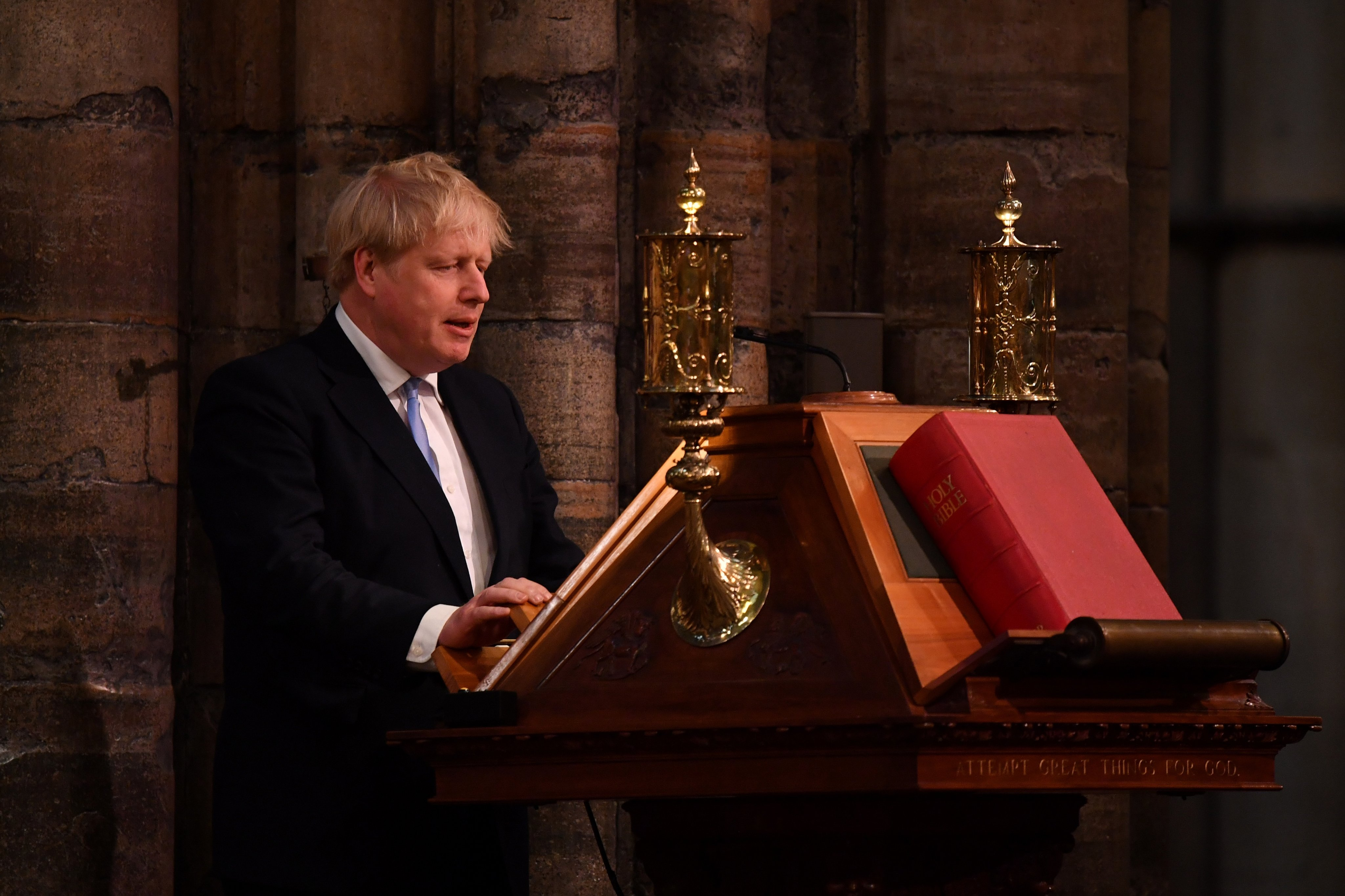
Johnson speaking at Westminster Abbey's Commonwealth Day service, 2020

Johnson was baptised Catholic and later confirmed in the Church of England, but has said that his faith "comes and goes" and that he is not a serious practising Christian. In 2020 his son Wilfred was baptised Catholic. Johnson and Symonds married in a Catholic ceremony at Westminster Cathedral on 29 May 2021. Since he was baptised Catholic, but his previous weddings were not conferred by the Catholic Church, the Catholic Church considered them putatively invalid.

Johnson holds ancient Greek statesman Pericles as a personal hero. According to Johnson's biographer, Andrew Gimson, regarding ancient Greek and Roman polytheism: "it is clear that [Johnson] is inspired by the Romans, and even more by the Greeks, and repelled by the early Christians". Johnson views secular humanism positively and sees it as owing more to the classical world than to Christian thinking. In 2021 Johnson was asked if he held pre-Christian beliefs, which he denied, saying, "Christianity is a superb ethical system and I would count myself as a kind of very, very bad Christian... Christianity makes a lot of sense to me."

=== Relationships and children ===
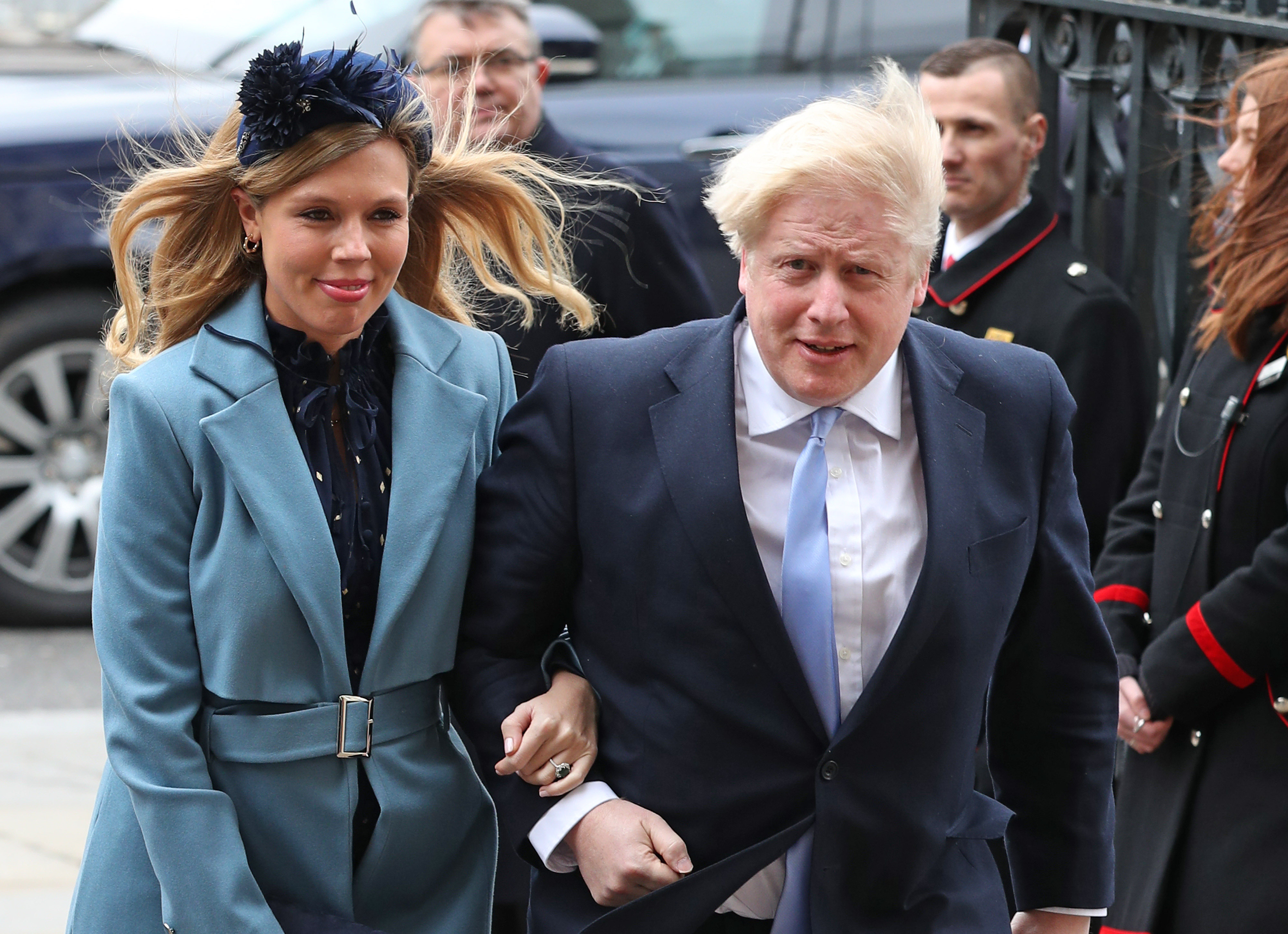
Johnson with his then-fiancée Carrie Symonds on Commonwealth Day, 2020

Johnson and Allegra Mostyn-Owen married on 5 September 1987; they had no children together. On 26 April 1993, the couple were granted a divorce or annulment, (Note: Sources differ on whether the marriage ended in divorce or with an annulment.) which Mostyn-Owen sought due to Johnson's affair with barrister Marina Wheeler, daughter of journalist Charles Wheeler. On 8 May 1993, twelve days after the end of his marriage to Mostyn-Owen, he married Wheeler, who gave birth to their first child five weeks later. They have four children together: Lara (born 1993), Milo (born 1995), Cassia (born 1997) and Theodore (born 1999).

Between 2000 and 2004, Johnson had an affair with Spectator columnist Petronella Wyatt, resulting in a terminated pregnancy and a miscarriage. In April 2006, the News of the World alleged that he was having an affair with Times Higher Education journalist Anna Fazackerley. The pair did not comment; Fazackerley resigned after her editor questioned her about the allegations, and Johnson secured her a job as director of a higher education think tank. In 2009, he fathered a daughter, Stephanie, with arts consultant Helen Macintyre, who subsequently lost a legal action to prevent publication of her daughter's paternity. Johnson has declined to discuss his children when asked how many he had in subsequent interviews. American entrepreneur Jennifer Arcuri said that she had an affair with him from 2012 to 2016. In early 2018, he began an affair with Carrie Symonds, then the Conservative Party's director of communications. In September 2018, following media reports about the affair, Johnson and Wheeler confirmed that they had separated and were divorcing. Johnson was subsequently reported to be sharing a flat with Symonds.

After Johnson became prime minister in July 2019, he and Symonds moved into a flat above 11 Downing Street, the first time a prime minister had lived in Downing Street with an unmarried partner. In February 2020, his divorce from Wheeler was finalised, making him the first prime minister to get divorced while in office since 1769. Later that month, Symonds announced that she and Johnson had become engaged in late 2019 and were expecting their first child. She gave birth to their son Wilfred in April 2020. She suffered a miscarriage in early 2021. On 29 May 2021, Johnson and Symonds married at Westminster Cathedral. In September 2021, Johnson claimed in a US television interview that he then had six children, the first time he had stated the number, although this has not been officially confirmed. He and Symonds subsequently had three more children, a daughter Romy (born December 2021), a son Frank (born July 2023), and a daughter Poppy (born May 2025). The couple purchased Brightwell Manor, a 400 year-old Grade II-listed country house, near Wallingford in Oxfordshire in 2023, for around £3.8 million.

=== Family and ancestors ===
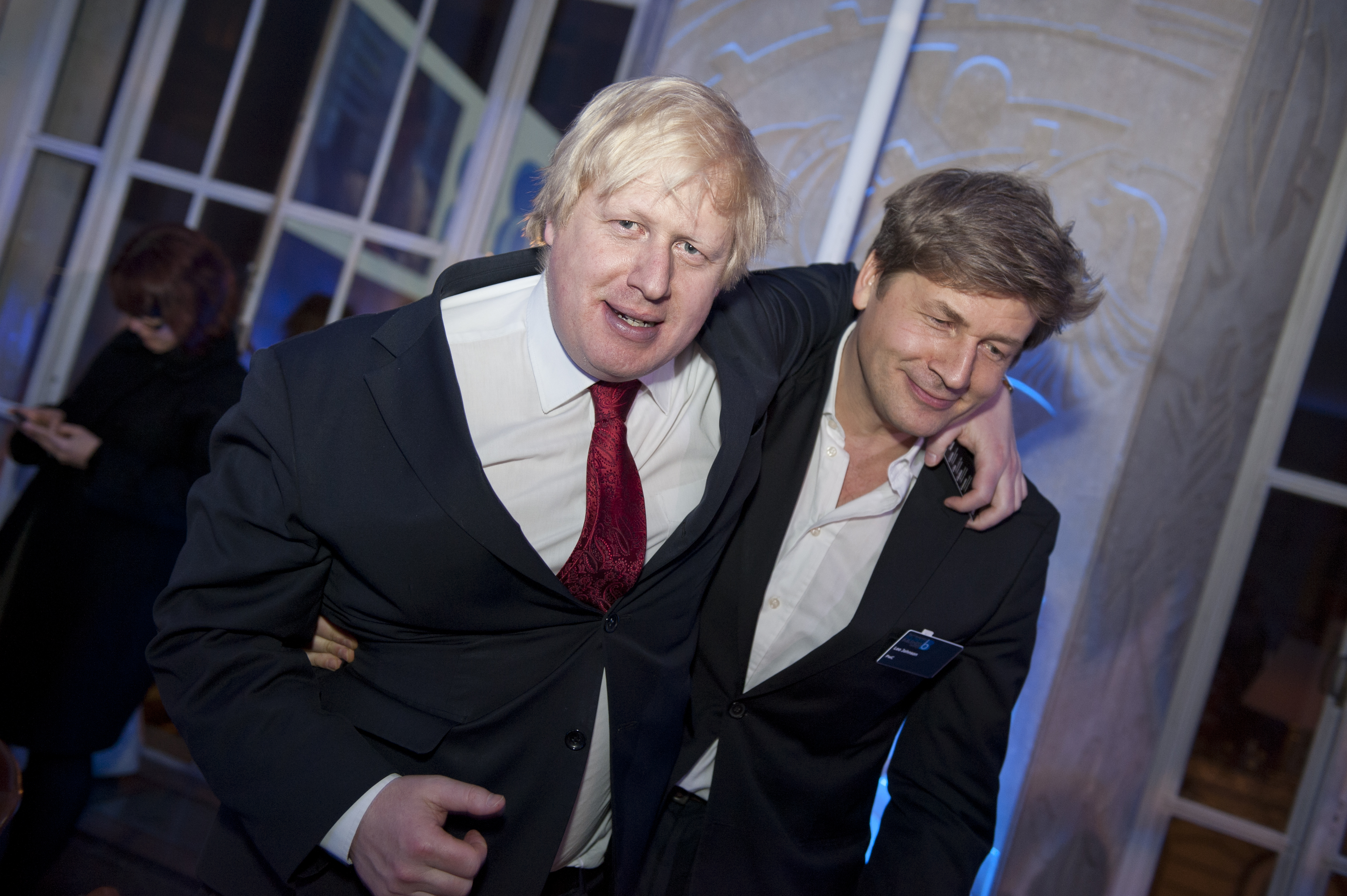
Johnson and his younger brother Leo in 2013

Johnson is the eldest of the four children of Stanley Johnson, a former Conservative member of the European Parliament, and the painter Charlotte Johnson Wahl (née Fawcett), the daughter of Sir James Fawcett, president of the European Commission of Human Rights. His younger siblings are Rachel Johnson, a writer and journalist, Leo Johnson, a broadcaster, and Jo Johnson, ex-minister of state and former Conservative MP for Orpington, who resigned from his brother's government in September 2019 and is now a member of the House of Lords. Johnson's stepmother, Jenny, the second wife of his father Stanley, is the stepdaughter of Teddy Sieff, the former chairman of Marks & Spencer. Having been a member of the Conservatives between 2008 and 2011, Rachel Johnson joined the Liberal Democrats in 2017. She stood as a candidate for Change UK in the 2019 European Elections. Johnson also has two half-siblings, Julia and Maximilian, through his father's later marriage to Jennifer Kidd.

Johnson's paternal grandfather, Wilfred Johnson, was an RAF pilot in Coastal Command during the Second World War. Wilfred Johnson's father was the Ottoman Interior Minister and journalist Ali Kemal. Ali Kemal's father was a Turk while his mother was a Circassian reputedly of slave origin. His other paternal ancestry includes English, German and French; one of his German ancestors was said to be the illegitimate daughter of Prince Paul of Württemberg and thus a descendant of George II of Great Britain, which was later confirmed on an episode of Who Do You Think You Are?

Johnson's mother is the granddaughter of Elias Avery Lowe, a palaeographer and a Russian Jewish immigrant to the US, and Pennsylvania-born Helen Tracy Lowe-Porter, a translator of Thomas Mann. Referring to his varied ancestry, Johnson has described himself as a "one-man melting pot". Johnson was given the middle name "Boris" after a White Russian émigré named Boris Litwin, who was a friend of his parents. Johnson's third given name, de Pfeffel, refers to the name of his great-grandmother Marie-Louise de Pfeffel's family.

== Honours ==
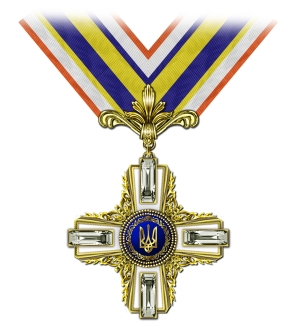
Order of Liberty

- Honorary degree of Doctor of Laws (LLD) from Brunel University London, 2007
- Honorary Fellowship of the Royal Institute of British Architects (Hon FRIBA), 2011
- Honorary Australian of the Year in the UK, 26 January 2014
- Sworn in as a Member of Her Majesty's Most Honourable Privy Council on 15 July 2016, upon his appointment as foreign secretary. This gave him the honorific title "The Right Honourable" for life.
- Medical Education Ig Nobel Prize, 2020 (shared with Jair Bolsonaro, Narendra Modi, Andrés Manuel López Obrador, Alexander Lukashenko, Donald Trump, Recep Tayyip Erdoğan, and Gurbanguly Berdimuhamedow).
- Honorary Citizen of Odesa, 2 July 2022
- Member of the Order of Liberty (Ukraine), 24 August 2022
- Honorary Citizen of Kyiv, 19 January 2023
- Honorary Doctorate from Ivan Franko National University, Lviv
- Foot in Mouth Award winner (2004, 2016, 2019)

== Works ==
- Friends, Voters, Countrymen (HarperCollins, 2001) ISBN 978-0-00-711913-4
- Johnson's Column (Continuum International – Academi, 2003) ISBN 978-0-8264-6855-0
- Lend Me Your Ears (HarperCollins, 2003) ISBN 978-0-00-717224-5
- Seventy-Two Virgins (HarperCollins, 2004) ISBN 978-0-00-719590-9
- Aspire Ever Higher / University Policy for the 21st century (Politeia, 2006)
- The Dream of Rome (HarperCollins, 2006) ISBN 978-0-00-722441-8
- Have I Got Views For You (HarperPerennial, 2006) ISBN 978-0-00-724220-7
- Life in the Fast Lane: The Johnson Guide to Cars (HarperPerennial, 2007) ISBN 978-0-00-726020-1
- The Perils of the Pushy Parents: A Cautionary Tale (HarperPress 2007) ISBN 978-0-00-726339-4
- Johnson's Life of London (HarperPress 2011) ISBN 978-0-00-741893-0
- The Churchill Factor (Hodder & Stoughton 2014) ISBN 978-1-44-478302-5
- Unleashed (William Collins 2024) ISBN 978-0008618209

== Notes ==
Media offices
Preceded by Frank Johnson	Editor of The Spectator; 1999–2005	Succeeded by Matthew d'Ancona
Parliament of the United Kingdom
Preceded by Michael Heseltine	Member of Parliament for Henley; 2001–2008	Succeeded by John Howell
Preceded by John Randall	Member of Parliament for Uxbridge and South Ruislip; 2015–2023	Succeeded by Steve Tuckwell
Political offices
Preceded by Ken Livingstone	Mayor of London; 2008–2016	Succeeded by Sadiq Khan
Preceded by Philip Hammond	Secretary of State for Foreign and Commonwealth Affairs; 2016–2018	Succeeded by Jeremy Hunt
Preceded by Theresa May	Prime Minister of the United Kingdom; 2019–2022	Succeeded by Liz Truss
Party political offices
Preceded by Theresa May	Leader of the Conservative Party; 2019–2022	Succeeded by Liz Truss
Diplomatic posts
Preceded by Emmanuel Macron (2019)	Chair of the Group of Seven; 2021	Succeeded by Olaf Scholz
Orders of precedence in the United Kingdom
Preceded by Ben Gummer as Privy Counsellor	Gentlemen; Privy Counsellor (sworn July 2016)	Succeeded by Sir Oliver Heald as Privy Counsellor
