= The Clown (short story) =

1897 short story by Thomas Mann

- Short story by Thomas Mann
- Original title: Der Bajazzo
- Country: Germany
- Language: German

Publication
- Pages: 35

"The Clown" (German: Der Bajazzo, Clown) is a short story by the 19th- and 20th-century German author Thomas Mann. It was first published in the German literary magazine Neue Rundschau in 1897, and were after his death, published as part of the collection Little Herr Freiedemann and Death in Venice and Other Stories.

The German title Der Bajazzo is formed from the Italian word used in the title of Ruggero Leoncavallo's opera Pagliacci, meaning clowns, an opera with which Mann was well-acquainted. The title has alternatively been translated as The Joker, suggesting an outsider or oddity. This is a theme strongly explored in this work. This is the most autobiographical of Thomas Mann's works before Tonio Kröger.

As in Little Herr Friedemann, Mann's idea of a life sustaining lie is explored as well. As in Little Herr Friedemann, the Joker learns that a life of aesthetic epicureanism cannot compensate for human isolation.

== Plot ==
=== Introduction ===
The protagonist contemplates suicide in a deep despair and plans to kill himself, even if he should live for another six months. He finds his life bleak and needless as life must be lived, which he isn't capable of doing.

=== Chapter 1 ===
The protagonist describes the old house in which he lived, with the motto "Pray and work" inscribed above the door. He further describes his slender and quiet mother and large, imposing and powerful father.

=== Chapter 2 ===
He takes after his mother, more interested in art than business. The protagonist learns to play the piano, becomes interested in literature and plays at being a director of a puppet theater. He is popular with his peers who defer to him, his grades however aren't good.

=== Chapter 3 ===
His interest in arts is further described, which his mother praises and his father criticizes as his grades are suffering because of it.

=== Chapter 4 ===
The protagonist overhears his parents talking about his future, his father wanting him to start apprenticeship and his mother wishing him to develop his art. He chooses to get into business and apprentices with Herr Schlievogt.

=== Chapter 5 ===
The protagonist is content with this life, but expresses interest in an artist's Epicurean life. Here he meets Schelling, a man who admires him and defers to him.

=== Chapter 6 ===
His father's company is liquidated, and his father dies due to stress and depression as well as overexerting himself in his work. His mother dies out of sadness soon after. He takes his inheritance of 100 000 marks and decides to travel.

=== Chapter 7 ===
A description of his travels through Palermo, Rome and other Italian cities, as well as North Africa, Spain, and France, before returning to Germany to a quiet life of contemplation. During these travels, after one of his piano performances, he for the first time takes a great delight in the appreciation of others.

=== Chapter 8 ===
The protagonist buys a house, furnishes it with his parents furniture and his mothers piano. He sets into a daily routine of playing the piano, reading, and taking walks. He feels a certain melancholy at the routine of his life and a lack of friends and social isolation.

=== Chapter 9 ===
The protagonist talks about his depression, isolation and ennui. He tries to convince himself of his own happiness.

=== Chapter 10 ===
At a point during his routine, the previous feelings strongly resurface, and he laments his lack of talent and unhappiness. At this point he makes a distinction between inner happiness, one's own opinion of himself – self-confidence and external happiness, the feeling of delight and joy because of the approval of others.

=== Chapter 11 ===
On a blue, sunny autumn morning the protagonist takes a walk along the town's main avenue. As he is walking, he is passed by a carriage driven by a dark woman, alongside her father, who he quickly becomes enamored with. He compares her to a jewel in a store and himself to a beggar looking at it from the street with envy.

=== Chapter 12 ===
He again sees her at the opera house. Not paying attention to the play, he looks at her with melancholy while listening to the music. Later they are joined by a person of high rank in society, who talks intimately with the woman. The protagonist expresses his contempt of the man to the reader. Following her home, he learns her name as Anna Rainer.

=== Chapter 13 ===
A bazaar for charitable causes is held at the town hall where the woman is to participate. He finds her selling wine, but in the presence of the man. Due to a long period of his self-isolation, he is unable to speak to her and leaves embarrassed. Later he learns that the woman and man from the opera are to be wed.

=== Chapter 14 ===
He runs into Schelling, who after some time notices his social degeneration and this time acts superior to him. He finally admits his unhappiness and recognizes his uselessness to society. At the end, he decides not to kill himself, as that would be too heroic for, as his father called him, a buffoon and a joker.

== Characters ==
- The Clown, or the Joker - an unhappy, untalented, depressed and anxious main character living in isolation from the society around him.
- Mother - the gentle, loving mother of the Joker.
- Father - the powerful father of the Joker, his opposite in personality.
- Herr Schlievogt - the owner of a timber business, appears in Little Herr Friedemann as well. Describes as red faced, fat and interested only in his trade.
- Sisters - the unnamed sisters of the Joker. Unlike him, they are part of society, and are the first to isolate him as an oddity.
- Anna Rainer - the women in the carriage, who he fell in love with. Holds the Joker to be beneath herself.
- Herr Assessor Dr. Alfred Withnagel - Anna Rainers fiancee, a man of power and influence in society.

== Autobiographical elements ==
A short story with autobiographical elements, the author's native Lübeck or the city of Munich in which he lived is the inspiration for the German towns mentioned in the novels. The inspiration for the Joker's parents are his own father, the consul Heinrich Mann, and his mother who likewise played Chopin to the author, just as the Joker's mother did. Mann's father run a business which was eventually liquidated, and the author enjoyed playing with a puppet theater.

The author lived a free-floating life, relying on his family's inheritance, and most of his jobs didn't last more than six months, and once for two years.

Author reflects on his own doubts of his talent and lack of any training. Likewise, written before his greater fame, he wondered if he had any social role, or if he was in fact only a dilettante.

== English translations ==
- H. T. Lowe-Porter (1936)
- David Luke (1988)
