= Tobias Mindernickel =

- Short story by Thomas Mann
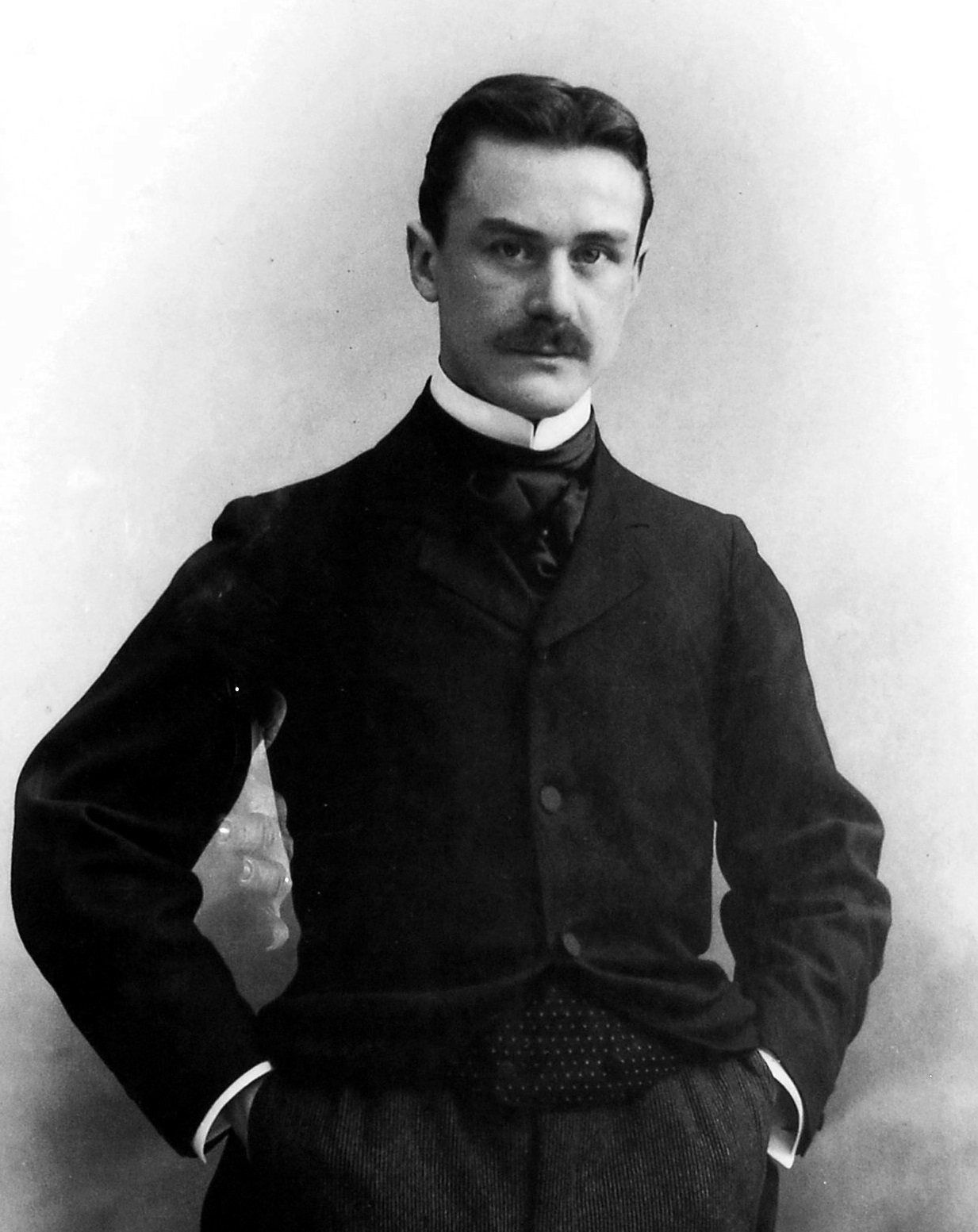
- Thomas Mann in 1900, two years after the publication of "Tobias Mindernickel"
- Language: German
- Genre: Short story

Publication
- Published in: Neue Deutsche Rundschau
- Publication date: January 1898

"Tobias Mindernickel" is an early short story by Thomas Mann. Written in 1897, while Mann was living in Rome with his elder brother Heinrich it was first published in January 1898 in the German literary magazine Neue Deutsche Rundschau. It has subsequently appeared in several anthologies of Mann's short stories and novellas.

== English translations ==
- H. T. Lowe-Porter, published in Stories of Three Decades (Alfred Knopf, 1936)
- Joachim Neugroschel, published in Death in Venice and Other Stories (Penguin, 1998)
- Jefferson S. Chase, published in Death in Venice and Other Stories (Signet, 1999).
