= Lotte in Weimar =

Lotte in Weimar can refer to:

- Lotte in Weimar: The Beloved Returns, a 1939 novel by Nobel Prize–winning German writer Thomas Mann
- Lotte in Weimar (film), a 1974 German film based on the novel
