= On the German Republic =

1922 work by Thomas Mann

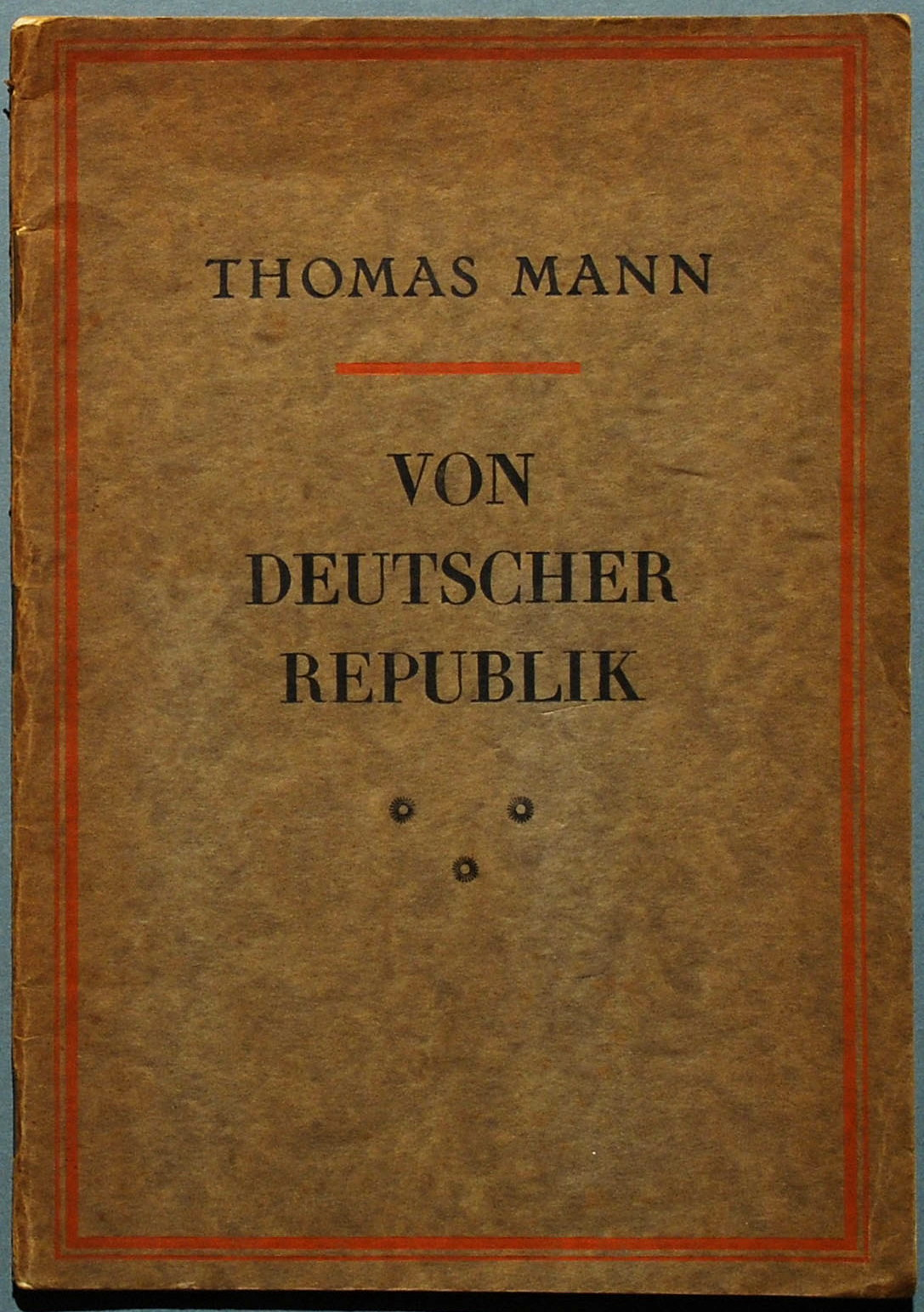
- Native name: Von deutscher Republik
- Date: 13 October 1922
- Location: Berlin Beethoven Auditorium

"On the German Republic" (German: Von deutscher Republik) is a work by Thomas Mann variously described as a lecture or an essay or a mixture of both forms which was first publicly delivered by its author on 13 October 1922 in the Berlin Beethoven Auditorium and subsequently published as a stand-alone work in 1923.

The work marked a turning point for Mann from criticism to support of the young Weimar Republic. The work has sometimes been noted as Mann's most famous speech.

== Background ==
Mann delivered the speech after the assassination of Walther Rathenau, the German foreign minister, on 24 June 1922, which had shocked him. In a letter to his friend Ernst Bertram, he decried the "darkness in the minds of these barbarians" (Finsternis in den Köpfen dieser Barbaren). After the assassination he wanted to reason with the German youth – which he saw as very conservative and romantic – by making a speech in support of the republic around Gerhard Hauptmann's 60th birthday. Gerhard Hauptmann was a German writer, who had won the 1912 Nobel Prize in Literature, and was known as one of the first intellectual supporters of the new German republic.

By delivering this speech, Mann also wanted to distance himself from conservative-reactionary forces within Germany, which revered Mann for his 1918 Reflections of a Nonpolitical Man.

Personally, 1922 was important for Mann as he reconciled during this year with his brother Heinrich, whom he had previously viciously attacked in the Reflections. Mann read a draft of the speech to a circle of friends including Heinrich on 6 October 1922.

== Lecture ==
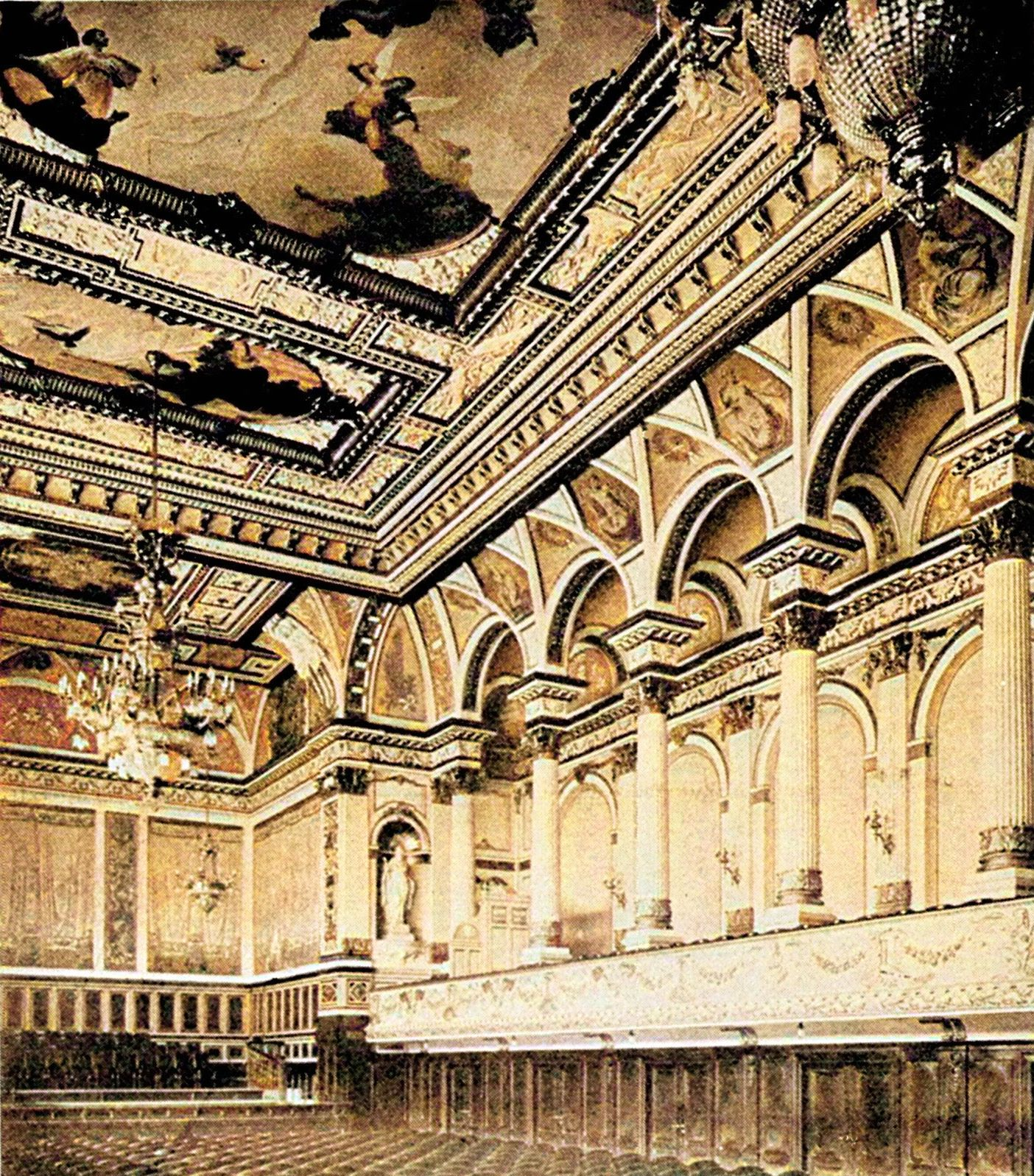
The Berlin Beethoven Auditorium in 1899

In his earlier Reflections of a Nonpolitical Man (1918), Mann had defended German authoritarianism and the "culture" of Germany against the "civilization" of the West. After the establishment of the Weimar Republic, his speech "On the German Republic" marked a turning point for Mann as he now – at least in part – supported the young republic.

The work was publicly delivered by Mann on 13 October 1922 in the Berlin Beethoven Auditorium (Köthenerstraße 32) which was part of the old Philharmonic complex and later destroyed during World War II. Whether the work constitutes a lecture or an essay or a mixed form is debated by scholars.

In his lecture, Mann compares the seemingly antithetical writers Novalis – an 18th-century German romantic – and Walt Whitman – a 19th-century American "poet of democracy" and explains that they have more in common than one initially assumes.

The lecture heavily relies on quotations. The American academic Lawrence S. Rainey counts 75 quotations from 12 persons (Gerhart Hauptmann, Stefan George, Johann Wolfgang von Goethe, Friedrich Nietzsche, Gustave Flaubert, Richard Wagner, Novalis, Walt Whitman, Adalbert Stifter, Dmitry Merezhkovsky, August von Platen-Hallermünde and Lothair I).

== Reception ==
=== Contemporary ===
In the contemporary conservative press, Mann was sharply attacked for his lecture. Das Gewissen (The Conscience) wrote "Mann overboard" (Mann über Bord) and Der Tag (The Day) named him "Saulus Mann" (Saul Mann). Some authors in the liberal press were also sceptical. Das Tage-Buch (The Diary) noted that the speech was held in Berlin and not in Mann's adopted city of Munich where reactionary forces could have broken the windows of his home for the speech. The paper called this "well-considered bravery" in an ironic tone.

=== Mann family ===
His daughter Erika reflected positively on the work. In 1965 she wrote:

Waves of insurrection and terror were sweeping the country. Democratic politicians had been shamefully assassinated, including the best among them, Walter Rathenau, whom Thomas Mann knew well. The German middle classes, unwilling to acknowledge the lost war's consequences as such, held the young Republic responsible for all the hardships. Thomas Mann's great essay, "On the German Republic" (1922), was his political recognition of the Republic in its hour of need and his most inopportune "step" since the Reflections. At this critical juncture its effect was startling, as if the author had thrown an incendiary bomb into his own house.

— Erika Mann, Mein Vater, der Zauberer [My father, the Magician]

=== Modern reception ===
Modern literary criticism has received the work in a positive light. Lawrence S. Rainey remarks that the work "offers pleasures, both in content and form" and that "its complex affirmation of the Weimar Republic was indeed a brave and prescient step." He particularly praises the "guarded affirmation of male love", which showed "a level of tolerance that was unusual for its time" and was "still valuable today."

The German academic Alexander Gallus has called the work "perhaps [Mann's] most famous speech".

== Publication history and translation ==
The lecture was first published in volume 33 issue 11 of Die neue Rundschau on pages 1072–1106 (1922) with the title "Thomas Mann for the German Republic" (Thomas Mann für die deutsche Republik). In 1923, it was published as a standalone work with the now common German title "Von deutscher Republik". It is contained in the volume 15.1 of the Große kommentierte Frankfurter Ausgabe (2002) – the editio maior of Mann's works – on pages 514–559.

The work was translated into English for the first time in 1942 by Helen Tracy Lowe-Porter, albeit without the passages on homoeroticism, which Mann wanted to omit for an American readership. In 2007, a complete translation into English was provided by Lawrence S. Rainey for the academic journal Modernism/modernity.
