= Thomas Mann =

German novelist (1875–1955)

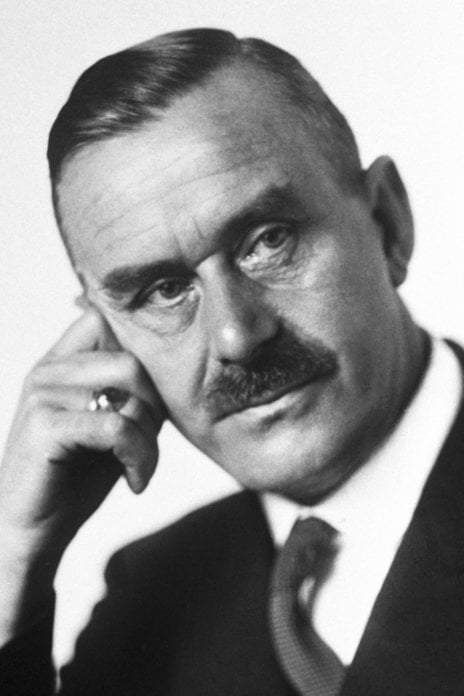
- Mann in 1929
- Born: Paul Thomas Mann; 6 June 1875; Lübeck, German Empire
- Died: 12 August 1955 (aged 80); Zürich, Switzerland
- Resting place: Kilchberg, Switzerland
- Citizenship: Germany (until 1936); Czechoslovakia (1936–1944); United States (from 1944)
- Education: Ludwig-Maximilians-Universität München; Technische Hochschule München
- Occupations: Writer; journalist; literary critic
- Employers: Princeton University; Library of Congress
- Spouse: Katia Pringsheim (m. 1905)
- Children: Erika, Klaus, Golo, Monika, Elisabeth, Michael
- Relatives: Mann family
- Writing career
- Years active: 1896–1954
- Period: 20th century
- Genres: Novel; novella; short story; sketch; play; screenplay; poetry; essay; autobiography; diary; lecture; oration; correspondence
- Notable works: Buddenbrooks, Death in Venice, The Magic Mountain, Joseph and His Brothers, Doctor Faustus
- Notable awards: Nobel Prize in Literature (1929); Goethe Prize (1949)
- Movement: Modernism

Paul Thomas Mann (Note: UK: /ˈmæn/ MAN, US: /ˈmɑːn/ MAHN; German: [ˈtoːmas ˈman]) (6 June 1875 – 12 August 1955) was a German novelist, short story writer, social critic, philanthropist, essayist, and the 1929 Nobel Prize in Literature laureate. His highly symbolic and ironic epic novels and novellas are noted for their insight into the psychology of the artist and the intellectual. His analysis and critique of the European and German soul used modern versions of German and Biblical stories, as well as the ideas of Johann Wolfgang von Goethe, Friedrich Nietzsche, and Arthur Schopenhauer.

The Mann family was part of the Hanseatic class. He portrayed both his family and the influential class in his first novel, Buddenbrooks (1901). Other major novels include The Magic Mountain (1924), the tetralogy Joseph and His Brothers (1933–1943), and Doctor Faustus (1947). He also wrote short stories and novellas, including Death in Venice (1912).

His older brother was novelist Heinrich Mann. Three of Mann's six children – Erika Mann, Klaus Mann and Golo Mann – also became significant German writers.

When Adolf Hitler came to power in 1933, Mann fled to Switzerland. When World War II broke out in 1939, he moved to the United States, returning to Switzerland after the war in 1952. Mann is one of the best-known exponents of the so-called Exilliteratur, German literature written in exile by those who opposed the Hitler regime.

== Life ==
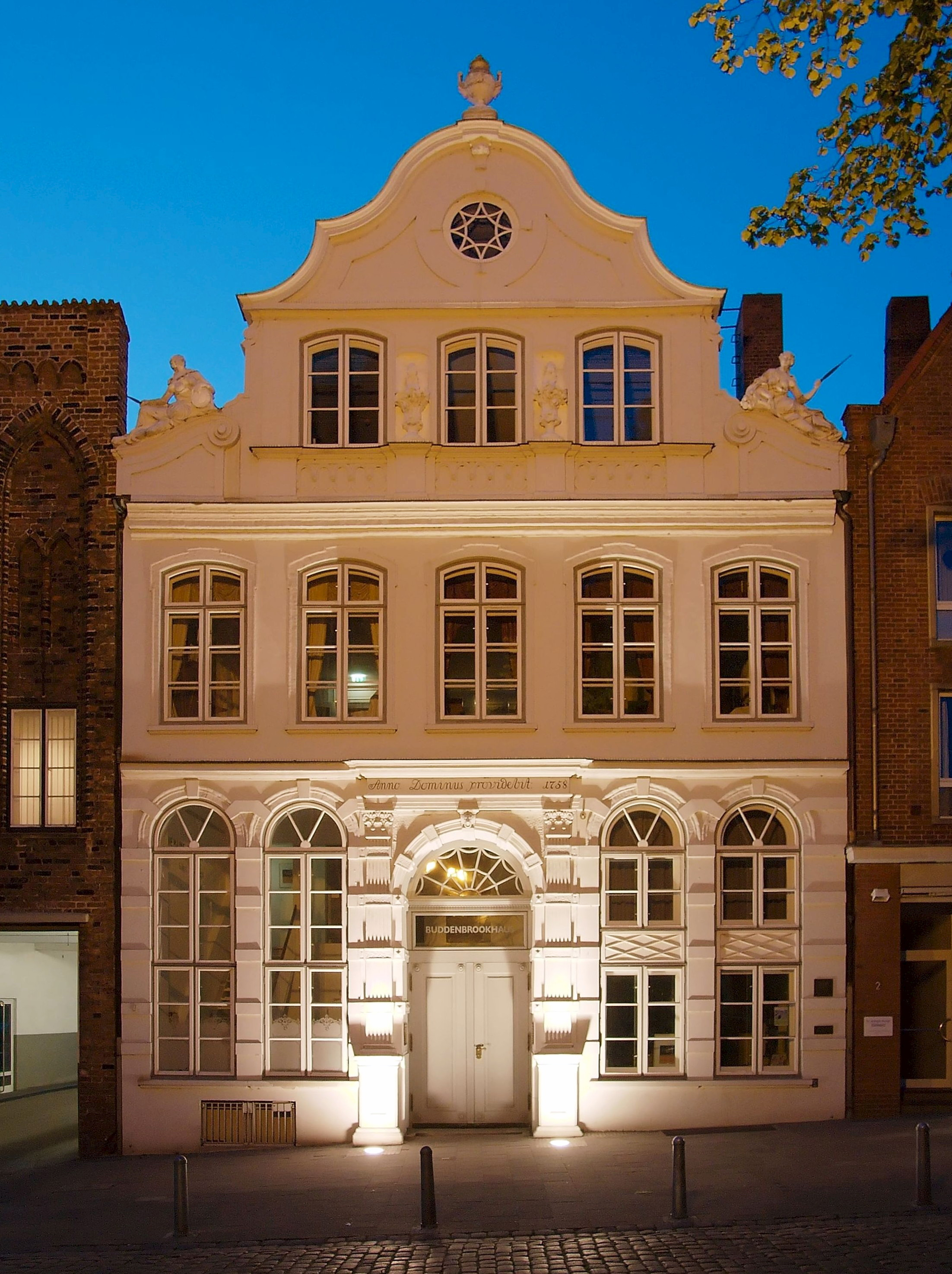
House of the Mann family in Lübeck (Buddenbrookhaus), where Thomas Mann grew up; now a family museum

Paul Thomas Mann was born to a Hanseatic family in Lübeck, the second son of Thomas Johann Heinrich Mann (a senator and a grain merchant) and his wife Júlia da Silva Bruhns, a Brazilian woman of German, Portuguese and Native Brazilian ancestry, who emigrated to Germany with her family when she was seven years old. His mother was Roman Catholic but Mann was baptised into his father's Lutheran religion. Mann's father died in 1891, and after that his trading firm was liquidated. The family subsequently moved to Munich. Mann first studied science at a Lübeck Gymnasium (secondary school), then attended the Ludwig-Maximilians-Universität München as well as the Technische Hochschule München, where, in preparation for a journalism career, he studied history, economics, art history and literature.

Mann lived in Munich from 1891 until 1933, with the exception of a year spent in Palestrina, Italy, with his elder brother, the novelist Heinrich. Thomas worked at the South German Fire Insurance Company in 1894–95. His career as a writer began when he wrote for the magazine Simplicissimus. Mann's first short story, "Little Herr Friedemann" (Der Kleine Herr Friedemann), was published in 1898.

In 1905, Mann married Katia Pringsheim, who came from a wealthy, secular Jewish industrialist family. She later joined the Lutheran church. The couple had six children: Erika (b. 1905), Klaus (b. 1906), Golo (b. 1909), Monika (b. 1910), Elisabeth (b. 1918) and Michael (b. 1919).

Due to the Pringsheim family's wealth, Katia Mann was able to purchase a summer property in Bad Tölz in 1908, on which they built a country house the following year, which they kept until 1917. In 1914 they also purchased a villa in Munich (at Poschinger Str in the borough of Bogenhausen, today 10 Thomas-Mann-Allee) where they lived until 1933.

=== 1912–1952 ===
In 1912, Katia was treated for what was incorrectly diagnosed as tuberculosis for a few months in a sanatorium in Davos, Switzerland, where Thomas Mann visited her for a few weeks. This inspired him to write his 1924 novel The Magic Mountain. The novel ends with the outbreak of this war, in which the hero enlists, with his survival uncertain.

Mann's attitude towards the First World War was complex. He was appalled by the risk of international confrontation between Germany and France following the Agadir Crisis in Morocco, yet was exuberant at the outbreak of the war. In "Gedanken im Kriege" ("Thoughts on War") he wrote, "Krieg! Es war Reinigung, Befreiung, was wir empfanden, und eine ungeheuere Hoffnung. Hiervon sagten die Dichter, nur hiervon." ("War! It was purification, liberation, that we felt, and an immense hope. Of this the poets spoke, only of this.") He held that pro-war attitude throughout the war, doubling down on it in "Reflections of a Nonpolitical Man", published in October 1918. Mann renounced his anti-democratic attitude in 1922, in his speech "Von deutscher Republik"; but did not renounce Nietzsche's Kultur / Zivilisation theory, which the Nazis had used heavily, until his 1945 speech "Deutschland und die Deutschen", given in the US Library of Congress. He never allowed either "Gedanken im Kriege" or "Reflections" to be printed in English.

As a "German patriot", Mann had the proceeds from their summer house used in 1917 to subscribe to war bonds, which lost their face value after the war was lost. His father-in-law did the same, which caused a loss of a major part of the Pringsheim family's wealth. The disastrous inflation of 1923 and 1924 resulted in additional high losses. The sales success of his novel The Magic Mountain, published in 1924, improved his financial situation again, as did the award of the Nobel Prize in Literature in 1929. He used the prize money to build a cottage in the fishing village of Nida, Lithuania on the Curonian Spit, where there was a German art colony and where he spent the summers of 1930 to 1932 working on Joseph and His Brothers. Today, the cottage is a cultural center dedicated to him, with a small memorial exhibition.

In February 1933, having finished a book tour to Amsterdam, Brussels and Paris, Thomas Mann moved to Arosa (Switzerland) when Hitler took power, and Mann heard from his eldest children, Klaus and Erika in Munich, that it would not be safe for him to return to Germany. His political views (see chapter below) had made him an enemy of the Nazis. He was doubtful at first, because he could not imagine the violence of the overthrow and the persecution of opponents of the regime. However, his children insisted; their advice later turned out to be accurate when it emerged that even their driver-caretaker had become an informant and that Mann's immediate arrest would have been very likely. The family (except these two children, who went to Amsterdam) emigrated to Küsnacht, near Zürich, Switzerland, after a stopover in Sanary-sur-Mer, France. The son Golo managed, at great risk, to smuggle the already completed chapters of the Joseph novel and the sensitive diaries into Switzerland. The Bavarian Political Police searched Mann's house in Munich and confiscated the house, its inventory and the bank accounts. At the same time, an arrest warrant was issued. Mann was also no longer able to use his holiday home in Lithuania because it was only a few hundred yards from the German border and he seemed to be at risk there. When all members of the Poetry Section at the Prussian Academy of Arts were asked to make a declaration of loyalty to the National Socialist government, Mann declared his resignation on 17 March 1933.

Children of Thomas Mann and Katia Pringsheim
Name	Birth	Death
Erika	9 November 1905	27 August 1969
Klaus	18 November 1906	21 May 1949
Golo	29 March 1909	7 April 1994
Monika	7 June 1910	17 March 1992
Elisabeth	24 April 1918	8 February 2002
Michael	21 April 1919	1 January 1977

The writer's freedom of movement was reduced when his German passport expired. The Manns traveled to the United States for the first two times in 1934 and 1935. There was great interest in the prominent writer; the authorities allowed him entry without a valid passport. He received Czechoslovak citizenship and a passport in 1936, even though he had never lived there. A few weeks later the German citizenship of Mann, his wife Katia, and their children Golo, Elisabeth and Michael were revoked, and the Nazi government expropriated the family home in Munich, which Reinhard Heydrich in particular insisted on. It had already been confiscated and forcibly rented out in 1933. In December 1936, the University of Bonn withdrew the honorary doctorate awarded to Mann in 1919; on 13 December 1946, after the defeat of Nazi Germany, it was reinstated.

In 1939, following the German occupation of Czechoslovakia, Mann emigrated to the United States, while his in-laws only managed, thanks to high-ranking connections, to leave Germany for Zurich in October 1939. The Manns moved to Princeton, New Jersey, where they lived on 65 Stockton Street and he began to teach at Princeton University. In 1941 he was designated consultant in German Literature, later Fellow in Germanic Literature, at the Library of Congress. In 1942, the Mann family moved to 1550 San Remo Drive in the Pacific Palisades neighborhood of Los Angeles, California. The Manns were prominent members of the German expatriate community of Los Angeles and frequently met other émigrés at the house of Salka and Bertold Viertel in Santa Monica, and at the Villa Aurora, the home of fellow German exile Lion Feuchtwanger. Thomas Mann's always difficult relationship with his brother Heinrich, who envied Thomas's success and wealth and also differed politically, hardly improved when the latter arrived in California, poor and sickly, in need of support. On 23 June 1944, Thomas Mann was naturalized as a citizen of the United States. The Manns lived in Los Angeles until 1952.

=== Anti-Nazi broadcasts ===
The outbreak of World War II, on 1 September 1939, prompted Mann to offer anti-Nazi speeches in German to the German people via the BBC. In October 1940, he began monthly broadcasts, recorded in the U.S. and flown to London, where the BBC German Service broadcast them to Germany on the longwave band. In these eight-minute addresses, Mann condemned Hitler and his "paladins" as crude philistines completely out of touch with European culture. In one noted speech, he said: "The war is horrible, but it has the advantage of keeping Hitler from making speeches about culture."

Mann was one of the few publicly active opponents of Nazism among German expatriates in the U.S. In a BBC broadcast of 30 December 1945, after the defeat of Germany, Mann said he understood why those peoples that had suffered from the Nazi regime would embrace the idea of German collective guilt, but also thought that many enemies might now have second thoughts about "revenge". He expressed regret that such judgement cannot be based on the individual:

Those, whose world became grey a long time ago when they realized what mountains of hate towered over Germany; those, who a long time ago imagined during sleepless nights how terrible would be the revenge on Germany for the inhuman deeds of the Nazis, cannot help but view with wretchedness all that is being done to Germans by the Russians, Poles, or Czechs as nothing other than a mechanical and inevitable reaction to the crimes that the people have committed as a nation, in which unfortunately individual justice, or the guilt or innocence of the individual, can play no part.

=== Houses that the Manns lived in ===
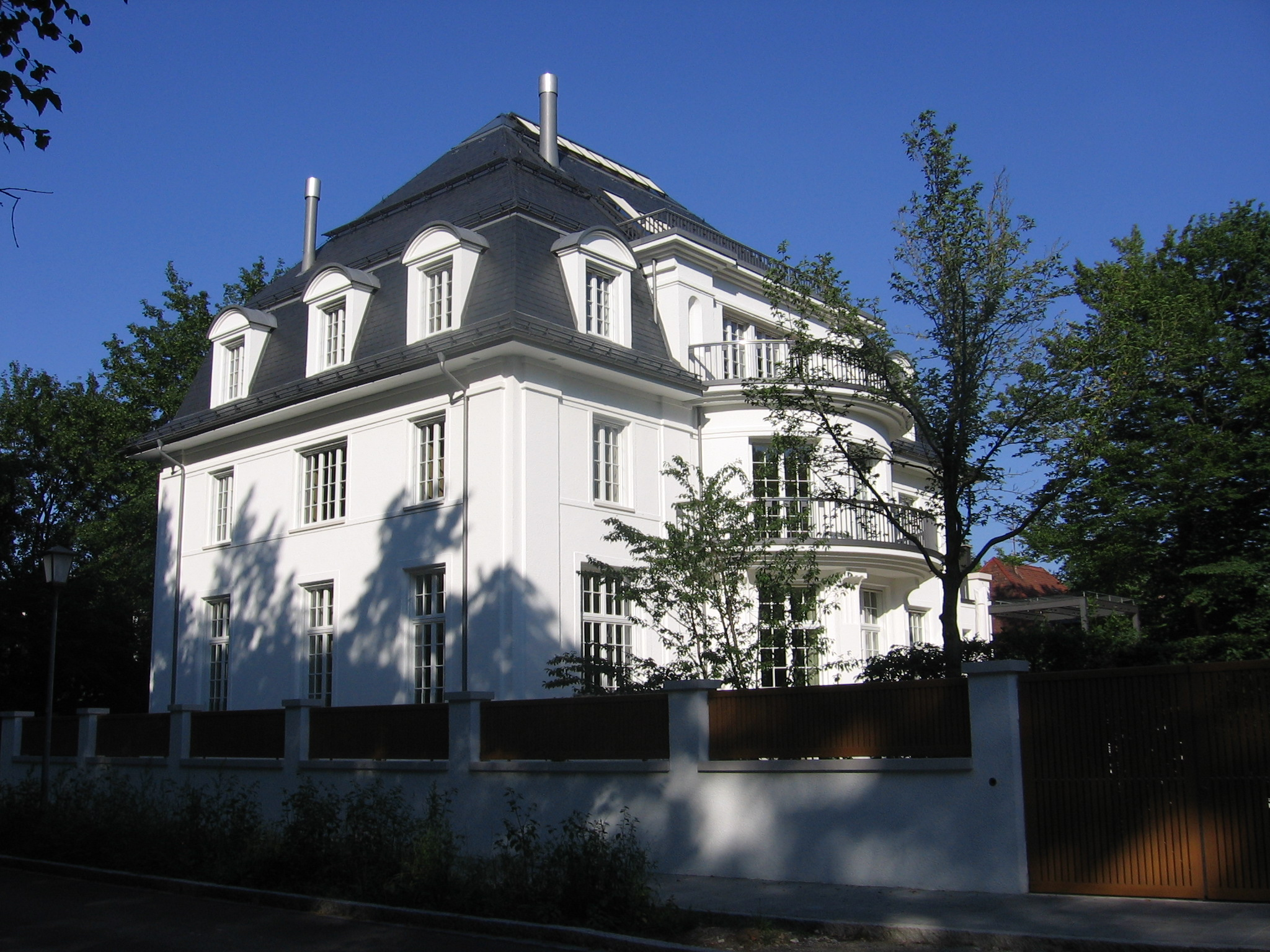
The family lived in this villa in Munich from 1914 to 1933. Partially destroyed in World War II, it was later reconstructed.

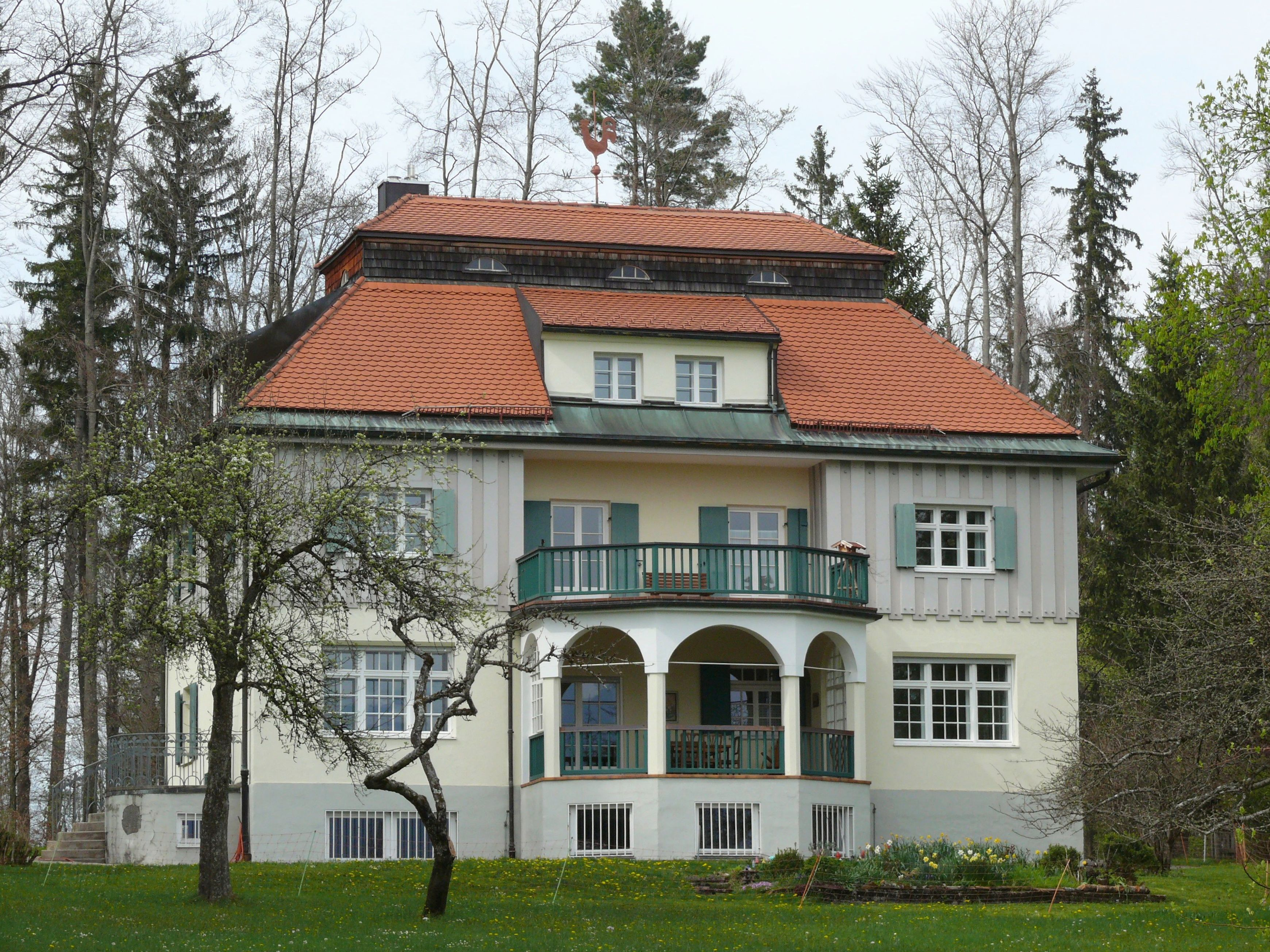
The family country house in Bad Tölz, Bavaria

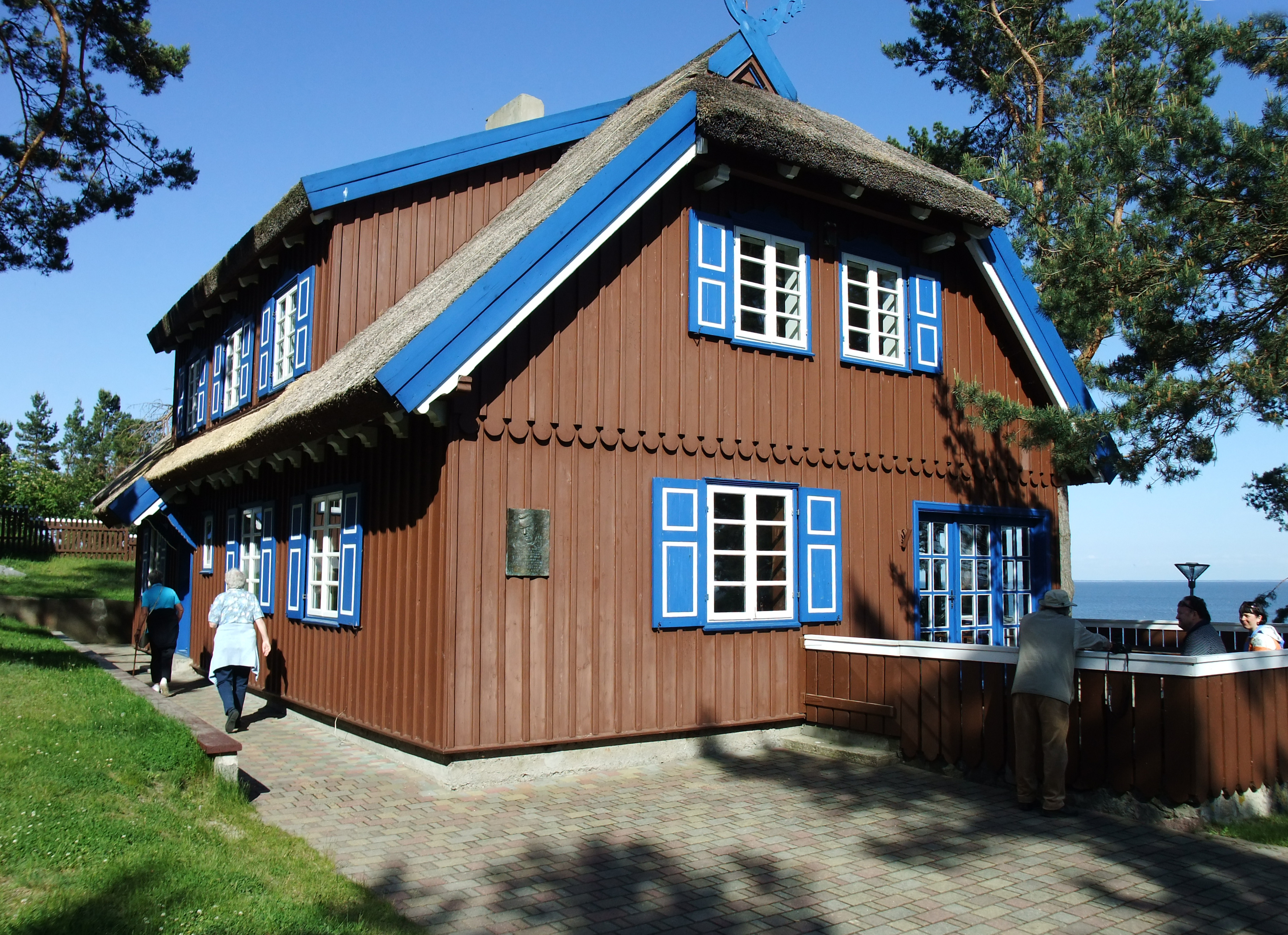
Mann's summer cottage in Nida, Lithuania, now a memorial museum

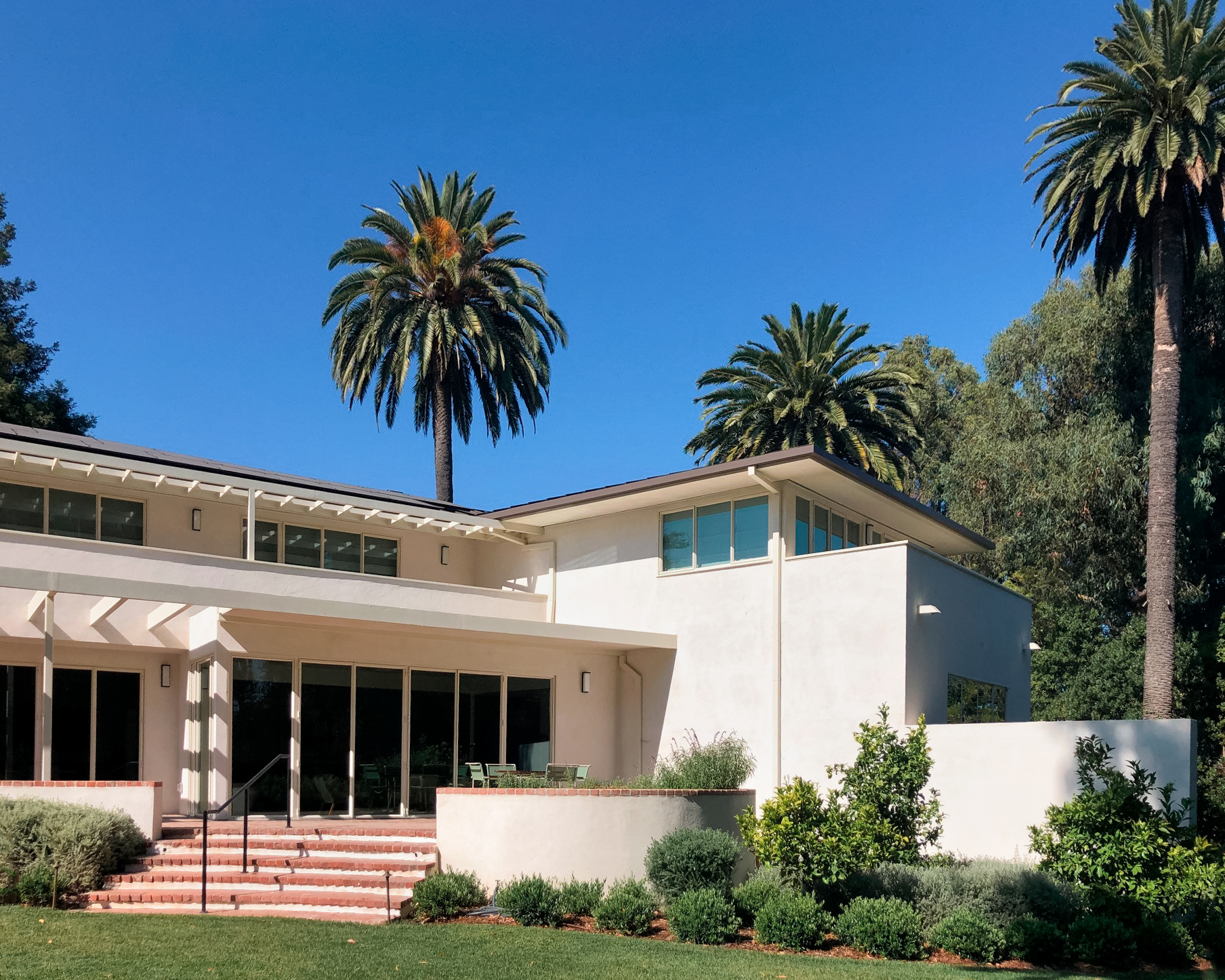
Thomas Mann House, Pacific Palisades, Los Angeles. Residence in exile from 1942 until 1952

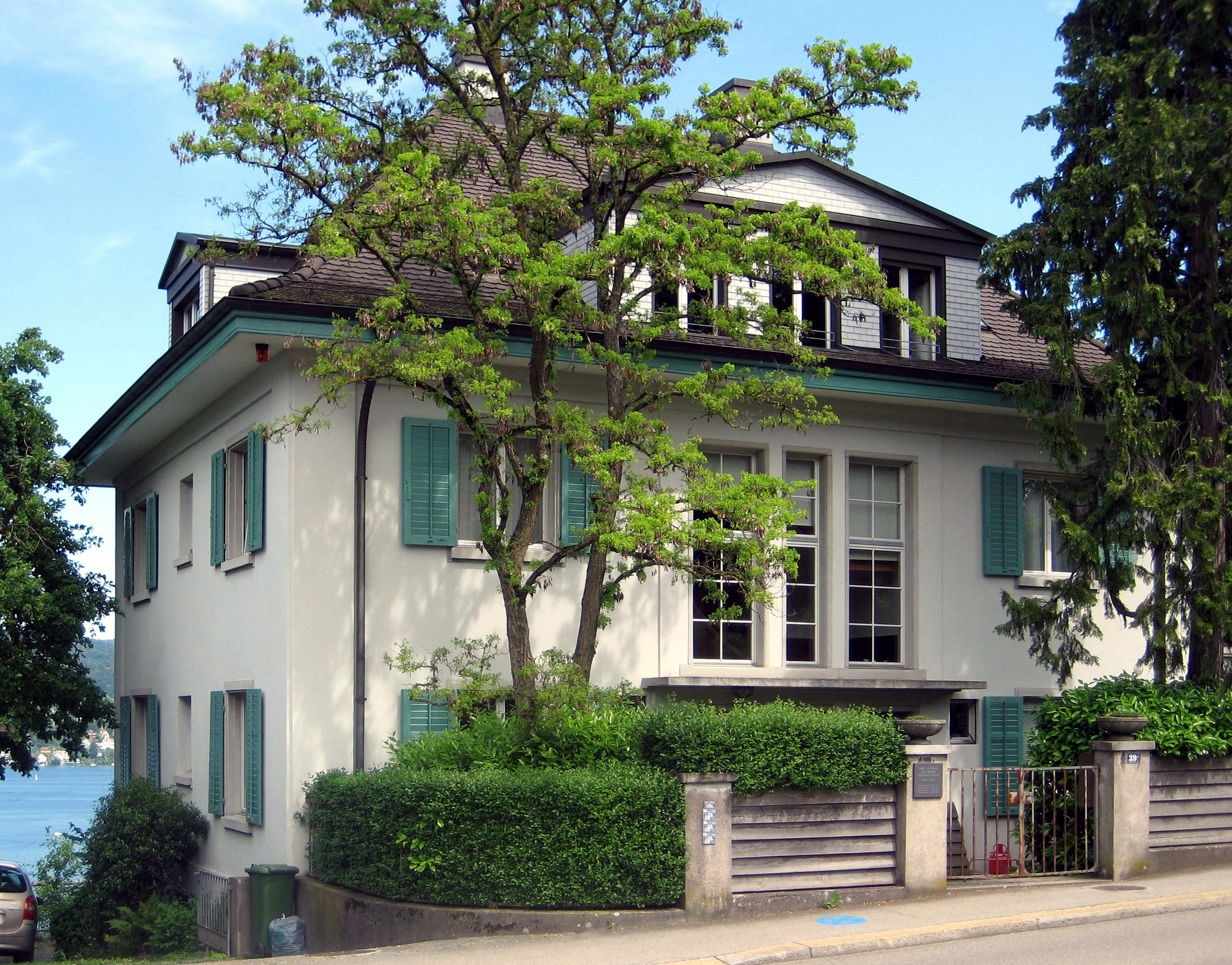
House in Kilchberg, Switzerland. Last residence 1954–1955

=== Last years ===
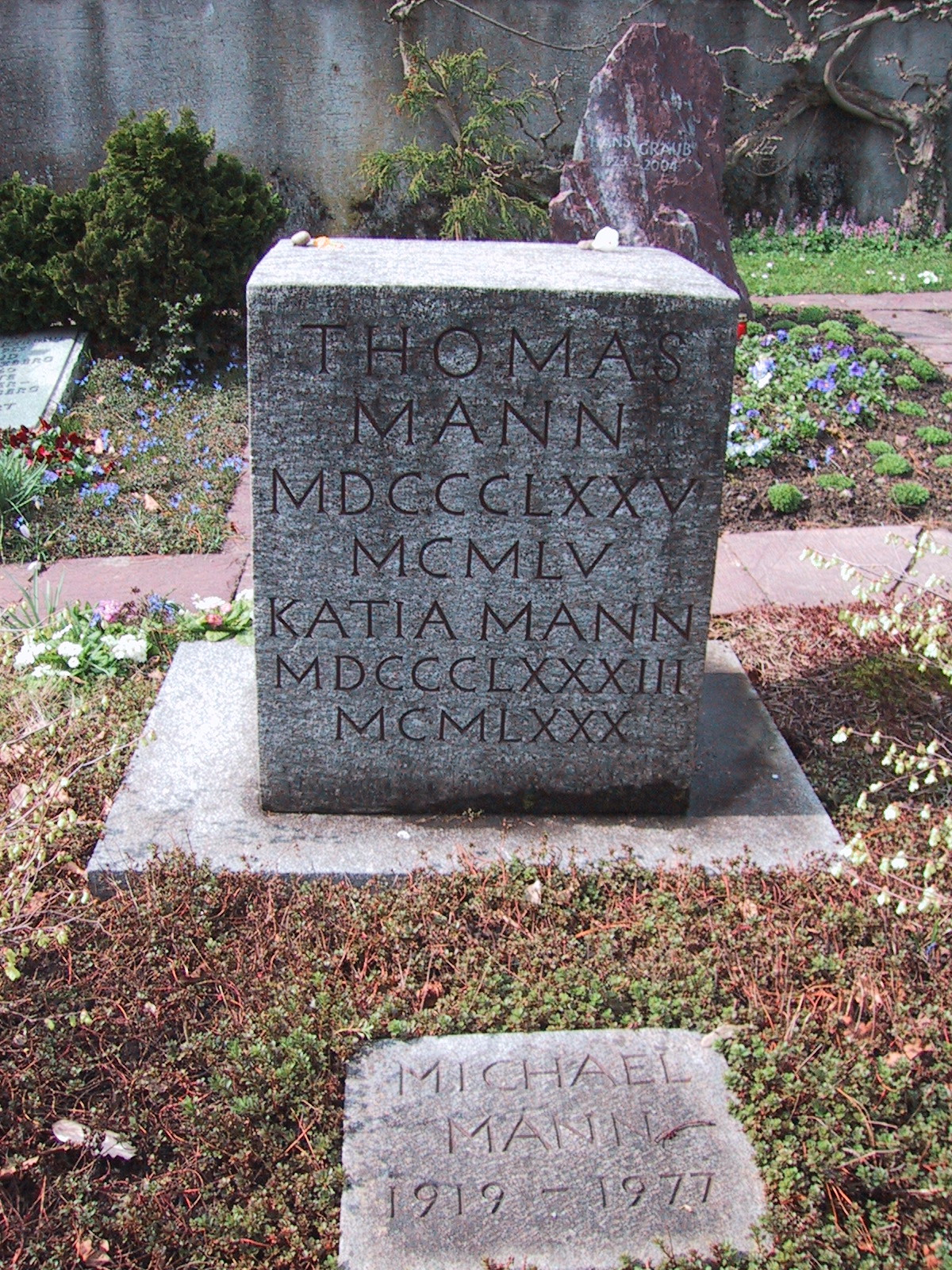
The grave of Thomas, Katia, Erika, Monika, Michael, and Elisabeth Mann, in Kilchberg, Switzerland. The gravestone is modeled on a Roman stele.

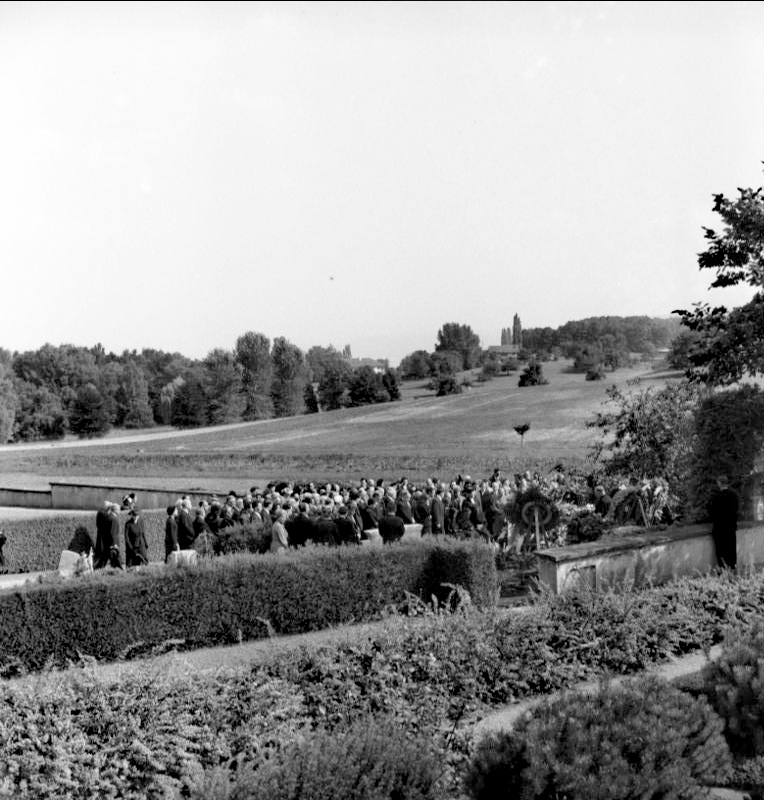
Mann's funeral, 1955

With the start of the Cold War, he was increasingly frustrated by rising McCarthyism. As a "suspected communist", he was required to testify to the House Un-American Activities Committee, where he was termed "one of the world's foremost apologists for Stalin and company". He was listed by HUAC as being "affiliated with various peace organizations or Communist fronts". Being in his own words a non-communist, rather than an anti-communist, Mann openly opposed the allegations: "As an American citizen of German birth, I finally testify that I am painfully familiar with certain political trends. Spiritual intolerance, political inquisitions, and declining legal security, and all this in the name of an alleged 'state of emergency'. ... That is how it started in Germany." As Mann joined protests against the jailing of the Hollywood Ten and the firing of schoolteachers suspected of being Communists, he found "the media had been closed to him". Finally, he was forced to quit his position as Consultant in Germanic Literature at the Library of Congress, and in 1952, he returned to Europe, to live in Kilchberg, near Zürich, Switzerland. Here he initially lived in a rented house and bought his last house there in 1954 (which later his widow and then their son Golo lived in until their deaths). He never again lived in Germany, though he regularly traveled there. His most important German visit was in 1949, at the 200th birthday of Johann Wolfgang von Goethe, attending celebrations in Frankfurt am Main (then West Germany) and Weimar (then East Germany), as a statement that German culture extended beyond the new political borders. He also visited Lübeck, where he saw his parents' house, which was partially destroyed by the bombing of Lübeck in World War II (and only later rebuilt). The city welcomed him warmly, but the patrician hanseatic families gave him a reserved welcome, since the publication of Buddenbrooks they had resented him for daring to describe their caste with some mockery, as they at least felt about it.

Along with Albert Einstein, Mann was one of the sponsors of the Peoples' World Convention (PWC), also known as Peoples' World Constituent Assembly (PWCA), which took place in 1950–51 at Palais Electoral, Geneva, Switzerland.

=== Death ===
Following his 80th birthday, Mann went on vacation to Noordwijk in the Netherlands. On 18 July 1955, he began to experience pain and unilateral swelling in his left leg. The condition of thrombophlebitis was diagnosed by Dr. Mulders from Leiden and confirmed by Dr. Wilhelm Löffler. Mann was transported to a Zürich hospital, but soon developed a state of shock. On 12 August 1955, he died. Postmortem, his condition was found to have been misdiagnosed. The pathologic diagnosis, made by Christoph Hedinger, showed he had actually suffered a perforated iliac artery aneurysm resulting in a retroperitoneal hematoma, compression and thrombosis of the iliac vein. (At that time, lifesaving vascular surgery had not been developed.) On 16 August 1955, Thomas Mann was buried in the Kilchberg village cemetery.

=== Legacy ===
Mann's work influenced many later authors, such as Yukio Mishima. Joseph Campbell also stated in an interview with Bill Moyers that Mann was one of his mentors. Many institutions are named in his honour, for instance the Thomas Mann Gymnasium of Budapest.

== Career ==
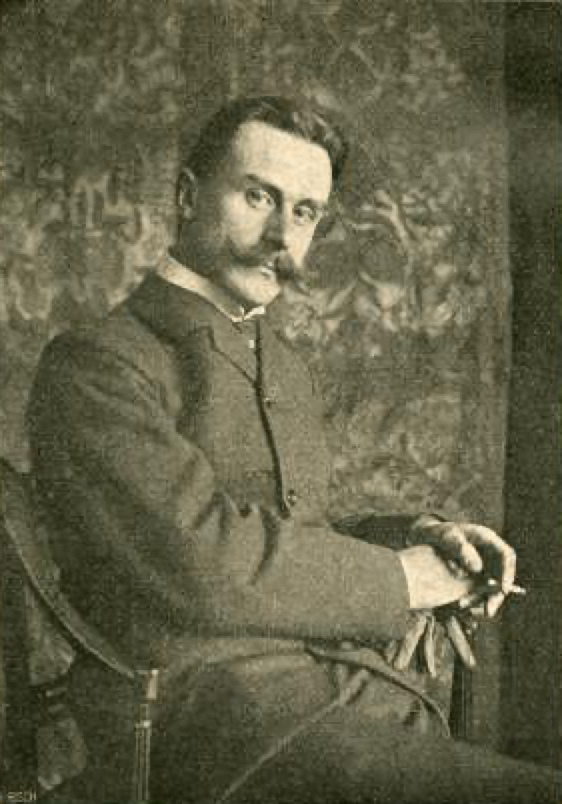
Mann in the early period of his writing career

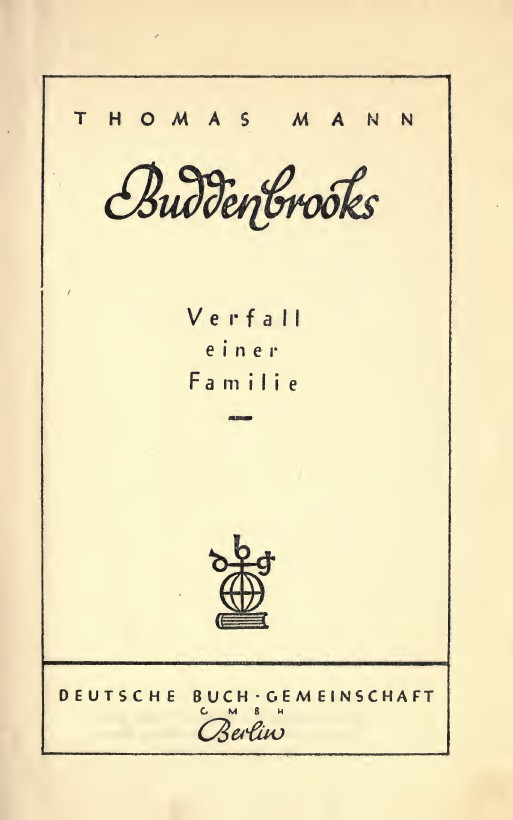
Buddenbrooks (1909)

Blanche Knopf of Alfred A. Knopf publishing house was introduced to Mann by H.L. Mencken while on a book-buying trip to Europe. Knopf became Mann's American publisher, and Blanche hired scholar Helen Tracy Lowe-Porter to translate Mann's books in 1924. Lowe-Porter subsequently translated Mann's complete works. Blanche Knopf continued to look after Mann. After Buddenbrooks proved successful in its first year, the Knopfs sent him an unexpected bonus. Later in the 1930s, Blanche helped arrange for Mann and his family to emigrate to America.

=== Nobel Prize in Literature ===
Mann was awarded the Nobel Prize in Literature in 1929, after he had been nominated by Anders Österling, member of the Swedish Academy, principally in recognition of his popular achievements with Buddenbrooks (1901), The Magic Mountain (Der Zauberberg, 1924), and his numerous short stories. (Due to the personal taste of an influential committee member, only Buddenbrooks was cited at any great length.) Based on Mann's own family, Buddenbrooks relates the decline of a merchant family in Lübeck over the course of four generations. The Magic Mountain (Der Zauberberg, 1924) follows an engineering student who, planning to visit his tubercular cousin at a Swiss sanatorium for only three weeks, finds his departure from the sanatorium delayed. During that time, he confronts medicine and the way it looks at the body and encounters a variety of characters, who play out ideological conflicts and discontents of contemporary European civilization. The tetralogy Joseph and His Brothers is an epic novel written over a period of sixteen years and is one of the largest and most significant works in Mann's oeuvre. Later novels included Lotte in Weimar (1939), in which Mann returned to the world of Goethe's novel The Sorrows of Young Werther (1774); Doctor Faustus (1947), the story of the fictitious composer Adrian Leverkühn and the corruption of German culture in the years before and during World War II; and Confessions of Felix Krull (Bekenntnisse des Hochstaplers Felix Krull, 1954), which was unfinished at Mann's death. These later works prompted two members of the Swedish Academy to nominate Mann for the Nobel Prize in Literature a second time, in 1948.

== Influence ==
The writer Theodor Fontane, who died in 1898, had a particular stylistic influence on Thomas Mann. Of course, Mann always admired and emulated Goethe, the German "poet prince". The Danish author Herman Bang, with whom he felt a kindred spirit, had a certain influence, especially on the novellas. The pessimistic philosopher Arthur Schopenhauer provided philosophical inspiration for the Buddenbrooks' narrative of decline, especially with his two-volume work The World as Will and Representation, which Mann studied closely while writing the novel. Russian narrators should also be mentioned, he admired the Russian Literature's ability for self-criticism, at least during the 19th century, in Nikolai Gogol, Ivan Goncharov and Ivan Turgenev. Mann believed that in order to make a bourgeois revolution, the Russians had to forget Dostoevsky. He particularly loved Leo Tolstoy, whom he considered an anarchist and whom he lovingly and mockingly admired for his "courage to be boring."

Throughout Mann's Dostoevsky essay, he finds parallels between the Russian and the sufferings of Friedrich Nietzsche. Speaking of Nietzsche, he says, "his personal feelings initiate him into those of the criminal ... in general all creative originality, all artist nature in the broadest sense of the word, does the same. It was the French painter and sculptor Degas who said that an artist must approach his work in the spirit of the criminal about to commit a crime." Nietzsche's influence on Mann runs deep in his work, especially in Nietzsche's views on decay and the proposed fundamental connection between sickness and creativity. Mann believed that disease should not be regarded as wholly negative. In his essay on Dostoevsky, we find: "but after all and above all it depends on who is diseased, who mad, who epileptic or paralytic: an average dull-witted man, in whose illness any intellectual or cultural aspect is non-existent; or a Nietzsche or Dostoyevsky. In their case something comes out in illness that is more important and conducive to life and growth than any medical guaranteed health or sanity.... [I]n other words: certain conquests made by the soul and the mind are impossible without disease, madness, crime of the spirit."

== Thematic and stylistic focuses ==
Many of Thomas Mann's works embody a "gravely-mischievous" style that is popular with readers, with superficial solemnity and an underlying ironic humor, mostly benevolent, never drastic or bitter and only rarely degenerating into the macabre. Thomas Mann took this "mild irony" from his literary predecessor and role model Theodor Fontane, at first in Buddenbrooks where it is modified into local sedateness through Low German sprinkles and quotations. He continued this style, with variations, throughout his life (the contemporary, much more avant-garde author Alfred Döblin mocked that Mann had "elevated the pressed crease to a style principle").

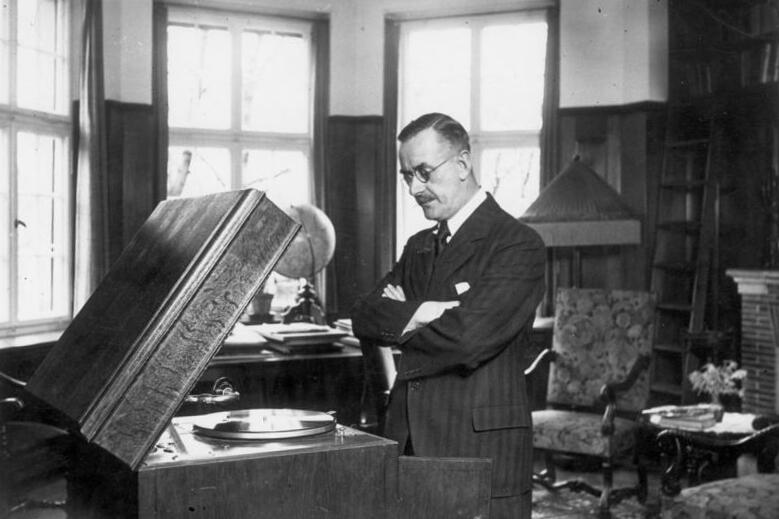
Thomas Mann with his gramophone in his Munich house (1932)

== Political views ==
During World War I, Mann supported the conservatism of Kaiser Wilhelm II, attacked liberalism, and supported the war effort, calling the Great War "a purification, a liberation, an enormous hope". In his 600-page-long work Reflections of a Nonpolitical Man (1918), Mann presented his conservative, anti-modernist philosophy: spiritual tradition over material progress, German patriotism over egalitarian internationalism, and rooted culture over rootless civilisation.

In "On the German Republic" (Von Deutscher Republik, 1922), Mann called upon German intellectuals to support the new Weimar Republic. The work was delivered at the Beethovensaal in Berlin on 13 October 1922, and published in Die neue Rundschau in November 1922. In the work, Mann developed his eccentric defence of the Republic based on extensive close readings of Novalis and Walt Whitman. Also in 1921, he wrote an essay Mind and Money in which he made a very open assessment of his family background: "In any case, I am personally indebted to the capitalist world order from the past, which is why it will never be appropriate for me to spit on it as it is à la mode these days". Thereafter, his political views gradually shifted toward liberal-left. He especially embraced democratic principles when the Weimar Republic was established.

Mann initially gave his support to the left-liberal German Democratic Party before urging unity behind the Social Democrats, probably less for ideological reasons, but because he only trusted it to provide sufficient mass and resistance to the growing Nazism. In 1930, he gave a public address in Berlin titled An Appeal to Reason, in which he strongly denounced Nazism and encouraged resistance by the working class. This was followed by numerous essays and lectures in which he attacked the Nazis. At the same time, he expressed increasing sympathy for socialist ideas. When the Nazis came to power in 1933, Mann and his wife were on holiday in Switzerland. Due to his strident denunciations of Nazi policies, his son Klaus advised him not to return. In contrast to those of his brother Heinrich and his son Klaus, Mann's books were not among those burnt publicly by Hitler's regime in May 1933, possibly since he had been the Nobel laureate in literature for 1929. In 1936, the Nazi government officially revoked his German citizenship.

During the war, Mann made a series of anti-Nazi radio-speeches, published as Listen, Germany! in 1943. They were recorded on tape in the United States and then sent to the United Kingdom, where the British Broadcasting Corporation transmitted them, hoping to reach German listeners.

=== Views on Soviet communism and German Nazism ===
Mann expressed his belief in the collection of letters written in exile, Listen, Germany! (Hör zu, Deutschland!), that equating Soviet communism with Nazi fascism on the basis that both are totalitarian systems was either superficial or insincere in showing a preference for Nazism. He clarified this view during a German press interview in July 1949, declaring that he was not a communist but that communism at least had some relation to ideals of humanity and of a better future. He said that the transition of the communist revolution into an autocratic regime was a tragedy while Nazism was only "devilish nihilism".

== Sexuality and literary work ==
Mann's diaries reveal his struggles with his sexuality, with his attraction to men finding frequent reflection in his works, most prominently through the obsession of the elderly Aschenbach for the 14-year-old Polish boy Tadzio in the novella Death in Venice (Der Tod in Venedig, 1912). Anthony Heilbut's biography Thomas Mann: Eros and Literature (1997) uncovered the centrality of Mann's sexuality to his oeuvre. Gilbert Adair's work The Real Tadzio (2001) describes how, in 1911, Mann had stayed at the Grand Hôtel des Bains on the Venice Lido with his wife and brother, when he became enraptured by the angelic figure of Władysław (Władzio) Moes, a 10-year-old Polish boy (the real Tadzio). While the story found acclaim, his wife would later recall that her own uncle was disgusted to hear of this attraction: "I still remember that my uncle, Privy Counsellor Friedberg, a famous professor of canon law in Leipzig, was outraged: 'What a story! And a married man with a family!'"

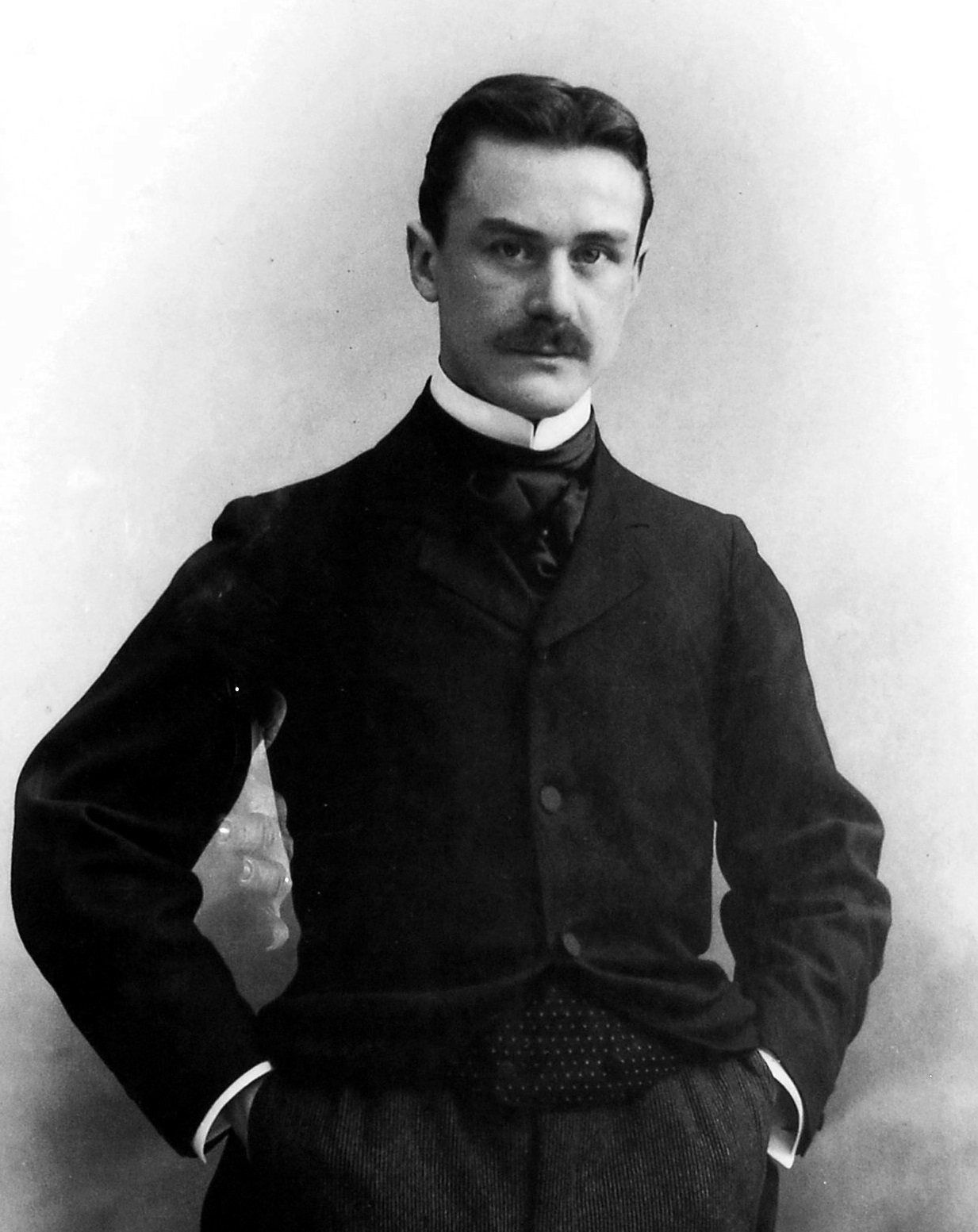
Thomas Mann in 1900 when he completed Buddenbrooks

In the autobiographical novella Tonio Kröger from 1901, the young hero has a crush on a handsome male classmate (modeled after real-life Lübeck classmate Armin Martens). In the novella With the prophet (1904) Mann mocks the believing disciples of a neo-Romantic "prophet" who preaches asceticism and has a strong resemblance to the real contemporary poet Stefan George and his George-Kreis ('George-Circle'). In 1902, George had met the 14-year-old boy Maximilian Kronberger; he made an idol of him and after his early death in 1904 transfigured him into a kind of Antinous-style "god".

Mann had also started planning a novel about Frederick the Great in 1905/1906, which ultimately did not come to fruition. The sexuality of Frederick the Great would have played a significant role in this, its impact on his life, his political decisions and wars. In late 1914, at the start of World War I, Mann used the notes and excerpts already collected for this project to write his essay "Frederick and the grand coalition" in which he contrasted Frederick's soldierly, male drive and his literary, female connotations consisting of "decomposing" skepticism. A similar "decomposing skepticism" had already estranged the barely concealed gay novel characters Tonio Kröger and Hanno Buddenbrook (1901) from their traditional upper class family environments and hometown (which in both cases is Lübeck). The Confessions of Felix Krull, written from 1910 onwards, describes a self-absorbed young dandyish imposter who, if not explicitly, fits into the gay typology, at one point considering, but ultimately refusing, the advances of a Scottish lord to accept him as his sugar daddy and in return be adopted and named as heir. The 1909 novel Royal Highness, which describes a young unworldly and dreamy prince who forces himself into a marriage of convenience that ultimately becomes happy, was modeled after Mann's own romance and marriage to Katia Mann in February 1905.

In The Magic Mountain, Hans Castorp, in love with Clawdia Chauchat, recalls his schooltime when, as a fourteen-year-old, he adored a classmate, Pribislav Hippe, whom he asked, with his heart pounding, if he could lend him his pencil, of which he keeps a few scraps like a relic. Borrowing and returning were interpreted as poetic masks for a sexual act. But it is not just a poetic symbol. In his diary entry from 15 September 1950, Mann remembers "Williram Timpe's scraps from his pencil", referring to a classmate from Lübeck. The novella Mario and the Magician (1929) ends with a murder due to a male–male kiss.

Numerous homoerotic crushes are documented in his letters and diaries, both before and after his marriage. Mann's diary records his incestuous attraction to his own 13-year-old son, "Eissi" – Klaus Mann: "Klaus to whom recently I feel very drawn" (22 June). In the background conversations about man-to-man eroticism take place; a long letter is written to Carl Maria Weber on this topic, while the diary reveals: "In love with Klaus during these days" (5 June). "Eissi, who enchants me right now" (11 July). "Delight over Eissi, who in his bath is terribly handsome. Find it very natural that I am in love with my son ... Eissi lay reading in bed with his brown torso naked, which disconcerted me" (25 July). "I heard noise in the boys' room and surprised Eissi completely naked in front of Golo's bed acting foolish. Strong impression of his premasculine, gleaming body. Disquiet" (17 October 1920). His younger son Golo, homosexual like Klaus, suffered lifelong from the lower esteem his father showed him, the less handsome and somewhat clumsy – but ultimately he inherited more of his father's literary talent than the older one.

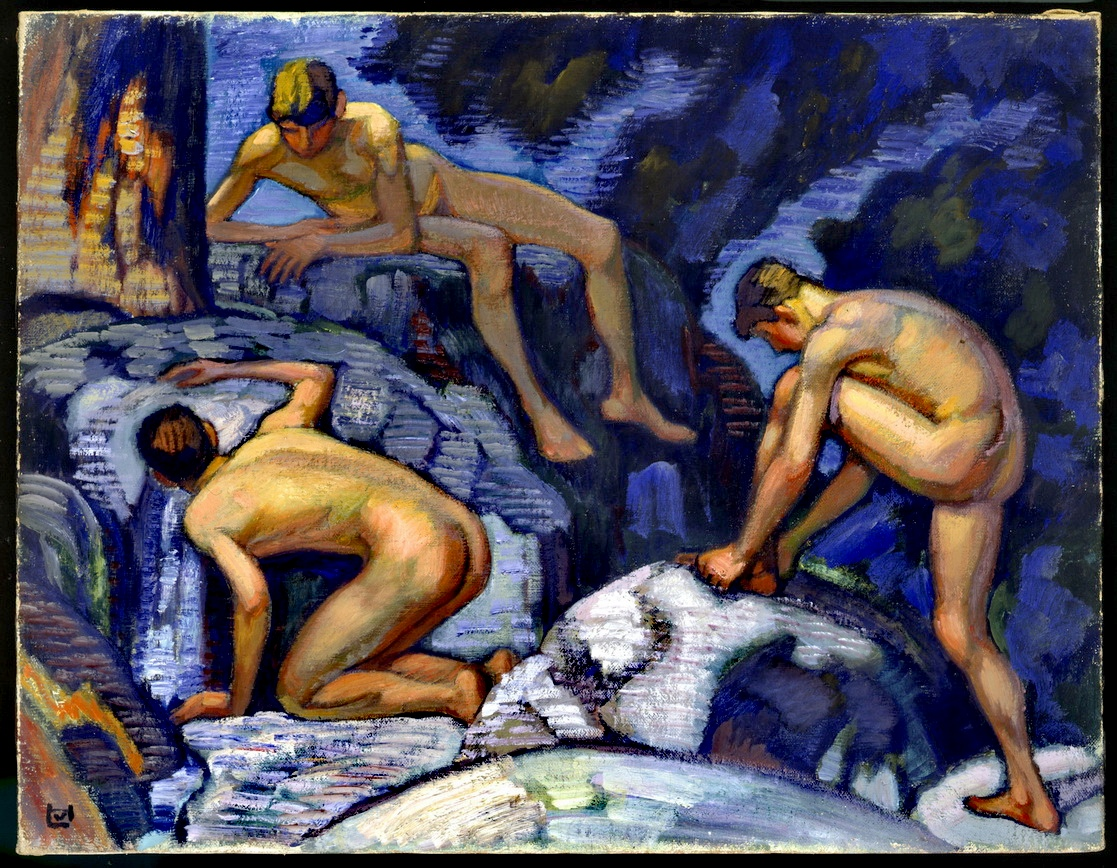
Ludwig von Hofmann: The Spring (1913). The picture, purchased in 1914, hung in Mann's study until his death.

Mann was a friend of the painter and violinist Paul Ehrenberg, for whom he had feelings as a young man (from 1899 to 1904, at least until around 1903 when there is evidence that those feelings had cooled). The attraction that he felt for Ehrenberg, which is corroborated by notebook entries, caused Mann difficulty and discomfort and may have been an obstacle to his marrying an English woman, Mary Smith, whom he met in 1901. In 1927, while on summer vacation in Kampen (Sylt), the 52-year-old Mann fell in love with 17-year-old Klaus Heuser, to whom he dedicated the introduction to his essay "Kleist's Amphitryon, a Reconquest" in the fall of the same year, which he read publicly in Munich in the presence of Heuser. Jupiter, who has transformed himself into the form of the general Amphitryon, tries to seduce his wife Alcmene when the real Amphitryon returns home and Alcmene rejects the god. Mann understands Jupiter as the "lonely artistic spirit" who courts life, is rejected and, "a triumphant renouncer", learns to be content with his divinity. In 1950, Mann met the 19-year-old waiter Franz Westermeier, confiding to his diary "Once again this, once again love". He immediately processed the experience in his essay "Michelangelo in his poems" (1950) and was also inspired to write "The Black Swan" (1954). In 1975, when Mann's diaries were published, creating a national sensation in Germany, the retired Westermeier was tracked down in the United States: he was flattered to learn he had been the object of Mann's obsession, but also shocked at its depth.

Mann's infatuations probably remained largely platonic. Katia Mann tolerated these love affairs, as did the children, because they knew that it did not go too far. He exchanged letters with Klaus Heuser for a while and met him again in 1935. He wrote about the Heuser experience in his diary on 6 May 1934: "In comparison, the early experiences with Armin Martens and Williram Timpe recede far into the childlike, and that with Klaus Heuser was a late happiness with the character of life-relevant fulfillment ... That's probably how it is humanly, and because of this normality I can feel my life is more canonical than through marriage and children." In the entry from 20 February 1942, he spoke again about Klaus Heuser: "Well, yes − lived and loved. Black eyes that shed tears for me, beloved lips that I kissed − it was there, I had it too, I'll be able to tell myself when I die." He was partly delighted, partly ashamed of the depth of his own emotions in these cases and mostly made them productive at some earlier or later date, but the experiences themselves were not yet literary. Only in retrospective, he converted them into literary production and sublimated his shame into the theory that "a writer experiences in order to express himself", that his life is just material. Mann even went so far as to accuse his brother Heinrich of his "aestheticism being a gesture-rich, highly gifted impotence for life and love." When Mann met the aging bachelor Heuser, who had worked in China for 18 years, for the last time in 1954, his daughter Erika scoffed: "Since he (Heuser) couldn't have the magician (= Thomas Mann's nickname with his children), he preferred to give it up completely."

Although Mann had always denied his novels had autobiographical components, the unsealing of his diaries revealing how consumed his life had been with unrequited and sublimated passion resulted in a reappraisal of his work. Thomas Mann had burned all of his diaries from before March 1933 in the garden of his home in Pacific Palisades in May 1945. Only the booklets from September 1918 to December 1921 were preserved because the author needed them for his work on Doctor Faustus. He later decided to have them − and his diaries from 1933 onwards – published 20 years after his death and predicted "surprise and cheerful astonishment". They were published by Peter von Mendelssohn and Inge Jens in 10 volumes.

From the very beginning, Thomas' son Klaus Mann openly dealt with his own homosexuality in his literary work and open lifestyle and referred critically to his father's "sublimation" in his diary. On the other hand, Thomas's daughter Erika Mann and his son Golo Mann came out only later in their lives. Thomas Mann reacted cautiously to Klaus's first novel The Pious Dance, Adventure Book of a Youth (1926), which is openly set in Berlin's homosexual milieu. Although he embraced male–male eroticism, he disapproved of gay lifestyle. The Eulenburg affair, which broke out two years after Mann's marriage, had strengthened him in his renunciation of a gay life and he supported the journalist Maximilian Harden, who was friends with Katia Mann's family, in his denunciatory trial against the gay Prince of Eulenburg, a close friend of Emperor Wilhelm II. Thomas Mann was always concerned about his dignity, reputation and respectability; the "poet king" Goethe was his role model. His horror at a possible collapse of these attributes found expression in the character of Aschenbach in Death in Venice. Cases like that of the industrialist Friedrich Alfred Krupp, who felt driven to suicide after a homosexual affair became public, were not uncommon and had a deterrent effect. But as time went on Mann became more open. He tolerated his son Klaus bringing his various lovers to lunch in Pacific Palisades, and was only appalled when these – navy sailors and the like – had never heard of him or his works, which, unfortunately, was mostly the case, leading to short, surly diary entries about their lack of culture. When the twenty-two-year-old novelist Gore Vidal published his third novel The City and the Pillar in 1948, a love-story between small-town American boys and a portrait of homosexual life in New York and Hollywood in the forties, a highly controversial book even among the publishers, not to mention the press, he sent a copy to Thomas Mann who responded politely, calling it a "noble work".

When the physician and pioneer of gay liberation Magnus Hirschfeld sent another petition to the Reichstag in 1922 to abolish Section 175 of the German Criminal Code, under which many homosexuals were imprisoned simply because of their inclinations, Thomas Mann also signed. However, criminal liability among adults was only abolished through a change in the law on 25 June 1969 − fourteen years after Mann's death and just three days before the Stonewall riots. This legal situation certainly had an impact throughout his life; the man whom the Nazis labeled a traitor never had any desire to be incarcerated for "criminal acts".

== Cultural references ==
=== The Magic Mountain ===
Several literary and other works make reference to Mann's book The Magic Mountain, including:

- Frederic Tuten's 1993 novel Tintin in the New World features many characters (such as Clavdia Chauchat, Mynheer Peeperkorn and others) from The Magic Mountain interacting with Tintin in Peru.
- Andrew Crumey's novel Mobius Dick (2004) imagines an alternative universe where an author named Behring has written novels resembling Mann's. These include a version of The Magic Mountain with Erwin Schrödinger in place of Castorp.
- Haruki Murakami's novel Norwegian Wood (1987), in which the main character is criticized for reading The Magic Mountain while visiting a friend in a sanatorium.
- The song "Magic Mountain" by the band Blonde Redhead.
- The painting Magic Mountain (after Thomas Mann) by Christiaan Tonnis (1987). "The Magic Mountain" is also a chapter in Tonnis's 2006 book Krankheit als Symbol ("Illness as a Symbol").
- The 1941 film 49th Parallel, in which the character Philip Armstrong Scott unknowingly praises Mann's work to an escaped World War II Nazi U-boat commander, who later responds by burning Scott's copy of The Magic Mountain.
- In Ken Kesey's novel Sometimes a Great Notion (1964), character Indian Jenny purchases a Thomas Mann novel and tries to find out "just where was this mountain full of magic..." (p. 578).
- Hayao Miyazaki's 2013 film The Wind Rises, in which an unnamed German man at a mountain resort invokes the novel as cover for furtively condemning the rapidly arming Hitler and Hirohito regimes. After he flees to escape the Japanese secret police, the protagonist, who fears his own mail is being read, refers to him as the novel's Mr. Castorp. The film is partly based on another Japanese novel, set like The Magic Mountain in a tuberculosis sanatorium.
- Father John Misty's 2017 album Pure Comedy contains a song titled "So I'm Growing Old on Magic Mountain", in which a man, near death, reflects on the passing of time and the disappearance of his Dionysian youth in homage to the themes in Mann's novel.
- Viktor Frankl's book Man's Search for Meaning relates the "time-experience" of Holocaust prisoners to TB patients in The Magic Mountain: "How paradoxical was our time-experience! In this connection we are reminded of Thomas Mann's The Magic Mountain, which contains some very pointed psychological remarks. Mann studies the spiritual development of people who are in an analogous psychological position, i.e., tuberculosis patients in a sanatorium who also know no date for their release. They experience a similar existence—without a future and without a goal."
- The movie A Cure For Wellness, directed by Gore Verbinski, was inspired by and is somewhat a modernization, somewhat a parody, of The Magic Mountain. In one scene, an orderly at the asylum can be seen reading Der Zauberberg.
- The album cover for Peter Schickele's recording of P.D.Q. Bach's "Bluegrass Cantata" shows an illustration of the 18th Century German bluegrass ensemble Tommy Mann and his Magic Mountain Boys.
- The 2022 novel The Empusium by Olga Tokarczuk reprises key plot elements from The Magic Mountain, including an alpine sanatorium for the treatment of tuberculosis, a time setting of 1913 which precedes World War I, a protagonist who is a young engineer and an isolated health resort as a microcosm of society.
- The 2025 song "Magic Mountain" by the band Japanese Breakfast.

=== Death in Venice ===
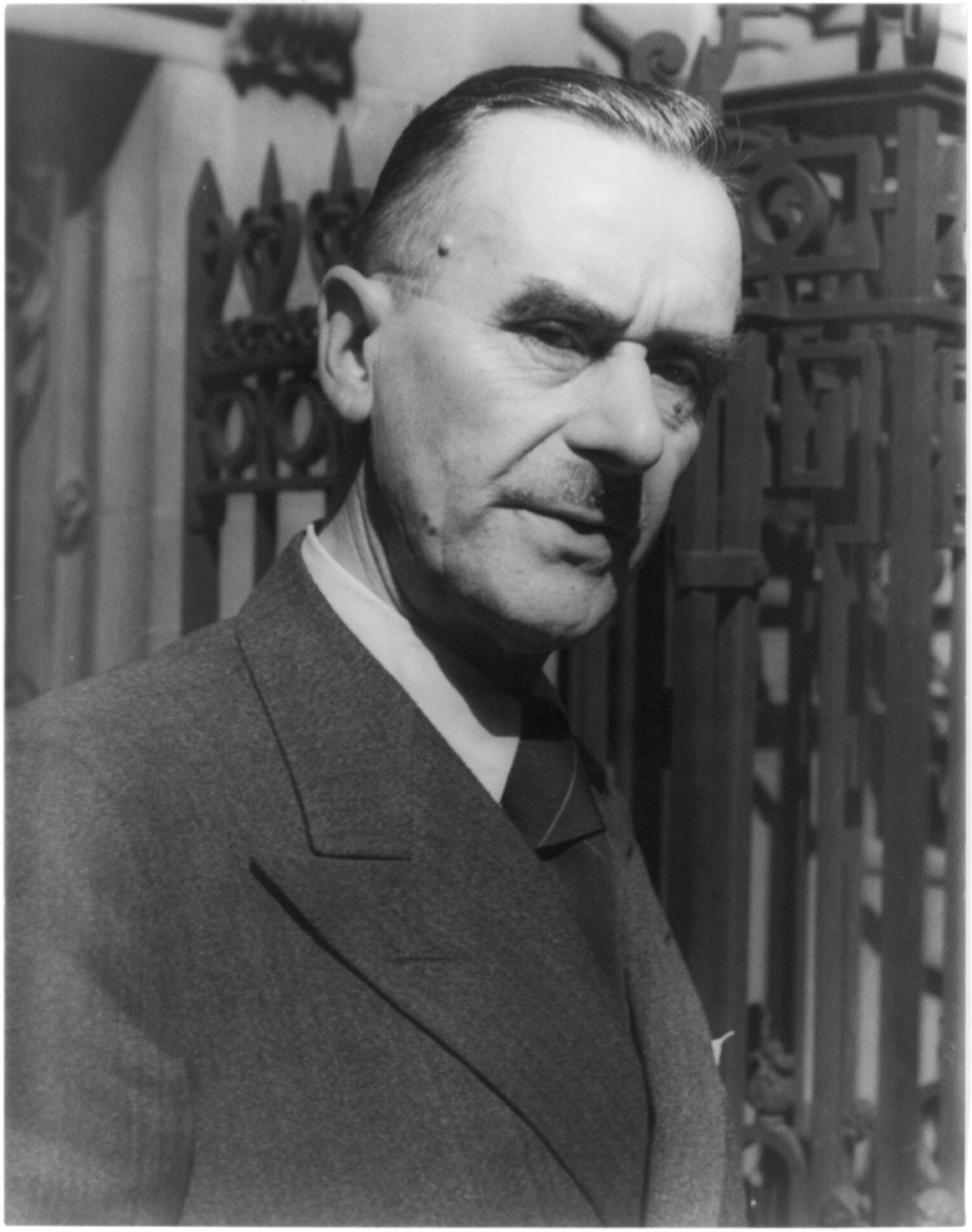
Mann, 1937

Many literary and other works make reference to Death in Venice, including:

- Luchino Visconti's 1971 famous film version of Mann's novella: Death in Venice (film)
- Benjamin Britten's 1973 operatic adaptation in two acts of Mann's novella.
- Woody Allen's film Annie Hall (1977) refers to the novella.
- Joseph Heller's 1994 novel, Closing Time, which makes several references to Thomas Mann and Death in Venice.
- Alexander McCall Smith's novel Portuguese Irregular Verbs (1997) has a final chapter entitled "Death in Venice" and refers to Thomas Mann by name in that chapter.
- Philip Roth's novel The Human Stain (2000).
- Rufus Wainwright's 2001 song "Grey Gardens", which mentions the character Tadzio in the refrain.
- Alan Bennett's 2009 play The Habit of Art, in which Benjamin Britten is imagined paying a visit to W. H. Auden about the possibility of Auden writing the libretto for Britten's opera Death in Venice.
- David Rakoff's essay "Shrimp", which appears in his 2010 collection Half Empty, makes a humorous comparison between Mann's Aschenbach and E. B. White's Stuart Little.
- Two main characters in Me and Earl and the Dying Girl make a spoof film titled Death in Tennis.
- 'A Good Year' 2006 film.
- In the MTV animated series Daria, Daria Morgendorffer receives from Tom Sloane a first-edition English translation as a present ("One J at a Time", Season 5, Episode 8, 2001) and is ridiculed by her sister, Quinn, for having a boyfriend who only gives her "a used book".

=== Other cultural references ===
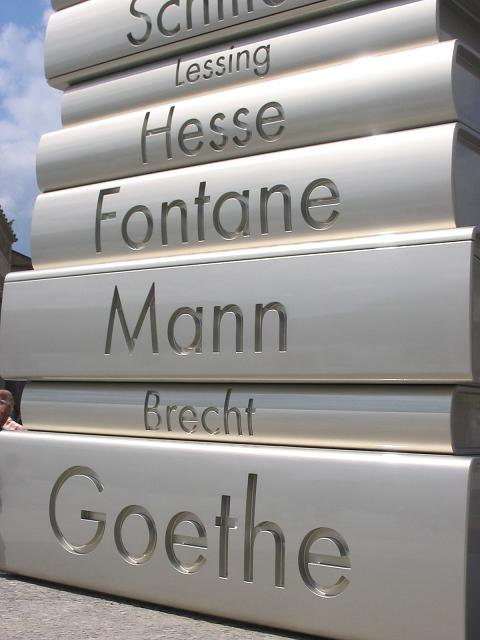
"Modern Book Printing" from the Walk of Ideas in Berlin, Germany – built in 2006 to commemorate Johannes Gutenberg's invention, c. 1445, of western movable printing type

- Hayavadana (1972), a play by Girish Karnad, was based on a theme drawn from The Transposed Heads and employed the folk theatre form of Yakshagana. A German version of the play was directed by Vijaya Mehta as part of the repertoire of the Deutsches National Theatre, Weimar. A staged musical version of The Transposed Heads, adapted by Julie Taymor and Sidney Goldfarb, with music by Elliot Goldenthal, was produced at the American Music Theater Festival in Philadelphia and the Lincoln Center in New York in 1988.
- Mann's 1896 short story "Disillusionment" is the basis for the Leiber and Stoller song "Is That All There Is?", famously recorded in 1969 by Peggy Lee.
- In a 1994 essay, Umberto Eco suggests that the media discuss "Whether reading Thomas Mann gives one erections" as an alternative to "Whether Joyce is boring".
- Mann's life in California during World War II, including his relationships with his older brother Heinrich Mann and Bertolt Brecht is a subject of Christopher Hampton's play Tales from Hollywood.
- In 2001, the three-part miniseries Die Manns – Ein Jahrhundertroman aired on German television, telling the story of the Mann family between 1922 and 1955. In the award-winning series, Thomas Mann is portrayed by Armin Mueller-Stahl.
- Hans Pleschinski's 2013 novel Königsallee fictionalizes an actual visit by Thomas Mann to Klaus Heuser's parents in Düsseldorf in 1954. He lets Mann's former lover come along with his boy named Anwar, as well as Mann's children Erika and Golo. Everything gets complicated.
- Colm Tóibín's 2021 fictionalised biography The Magician is a portrait of Mann in the context of his family and political events.
- Fatherland, a 2026 film written and directed by Paweł Pawlikowski, is based on an episode from Tóibín's The Magician where Mann and his daughter Erika embark on a road trip across Cold War-era Germany, culminating in Mann's visits to Frankfurt am Main and Weimar to commemorate the 200th birthday of Johann Wolfgang von Goethe. Mann is portrayed by Hanns Zischler, and Sandra Hüller portrays Erika Mann. The film premiered to critical acclaim at the 2026 Cannes Film Festival, where Pawlikowski won the prize for Best Director.
- In an episode of the popular German book and audioplay series The Three Investigators (Die drei ???), titled Geheimnis der sieben Palmen (English: "Secret of the Seven Palms") Thomas Mann and his house in the Pacific Palisades are prominently referenced as major elements of the story. The book was published in 2025 to mark the 150th anniversary of Mann's birth.

== See also ==
- Erich Heller (esp. s.v. "Writings on Thomas Mann", "Life in letters")
- Patrician (post-Roman Europe)
- Terence James Reed's Thomas Mann: The Uses of Tradition (1974)

== Literary works ==
=== Short stories ===
- 1893: "A Vision (Prose Sketch)"
- 1894: "Fallen" (Gefallen)
- 1896: "The Will to Happiness"
- 1896: "Disillusionment" (Enttäuschung)
- 1896: "Little Herr Friedemann" (Der kleine Herr Friedemann)
- 1897: "Death" (Der Tod)
- 1897: "The Clown" (Der Bajazzo)
- 1897: "The Dilettante"
- 1897: "Luischen" ("Little Lizzy" in H. T. Lowe-Porter's translation; "Louisey" in Damion Searls') – published in 1900
- 1898: "Tobias Mindernickel"
- 1899: "The Wardrobe" (Der Kleiderschrank)
- 1899: "Avenged (Study for a Novella)" (Gerächt)
- 1900: "The Road to the Churchyard/The Way to the Churchyard" (Der Weg zum Friedhof)
- 1903: "The Hungry/The Starvelings"
- 1903: "The Child Prodigy/The Infant Prodigy/The Wunderkind" (Das Wunderkind)
- 1904: "A Gleam"
- 1904: "At the Prophet's"
- 1905: "A Weary Hour/Hour of Hardship/Harsh Hour"
- 1907: "Railway Accident"
- 1908: "Anecdote" (Anekdote)
- 1911: "The Fight between Jappe and the Do Escobar"

=== Novellas ===
- 1902: Gladius Dei
- 1903: Tristan
- 1903: Tonio Kröger
- 1905: The Blood of the Walsungs (Wӓlsungenblut) (2nd Edition: 1921)
- 1911: Felix Krull (Bekenntnisse des Hochstaplers Felix Krull) – published in 1922
- 1912: Death in Venice (Der Tod in Venedig)
- 1918: A Man and His Dog/Bashan and I (Herr und Hund)
- 1925: Disorder and Early Sorrow in H. T. Lowe-Porter's translation; Early Sorrow in Herman George Scheffauer's; Chaotic World and Childhood Sorrow in Damion Searls' (Unordnung und frühes Leid)
- 1930: Mario and the Magician (Mario und der Zauberer)
- 1940: The Transposed Heads (Die vertauschten Köpfe – Eine indische Legende)
- 1944: The Tables of the Law (Das Gesetz) – a contribution for the anthology The Ten Commandments edited by Armin L. Robinson
- 1954: The Black Swan (Die Betrogene: Erzählung)

=== Novels ===
==== Standalone novels ====
- 1901: Buddenbrooks (Buddenbrooks – Verfall einer Familie)
- 1909: Royal Highness (Königliche Hoheit)
- 1924: The Magic Mountain (Der Zauberberg)
- 1939: Lotte in Weimar: The Beloved Returns
- 1947: Doctor Faustus (Doktor Faustus)
  - 1949: Die Entstehung des Doktor Faustus – autobiographical non-fiction book about the novel. Published in 1961 as The Story of a Novel: The Genesis of Doctor Faustus
- 1951: The Holy Sinner (Der Erwählte)
- 1954: Confessions of Felix Krull (Bekenntnisse des Hochstaplers Felix Krull. Der Memoiren erster Teil; expanded from 1911 short story), unfinished

==== Series ====
- Joseph and His Brothers (Joseph und seine Brüder) (1933–43)
1. The Stories of Jacob (Die Geschichten Jaakobs) (1933)
2. Young Joseph (Der junge Joseph) (1934)
3. Joseph in Egypt (Joseph in Ägypten) (1936)
4. Joseph the Provider (Joseph, der Ernährer) (1943)

=== Plays ===
- 1905: Fiorenza
- 1954: Luther's Marriage (Luthers Hochzeit) (fragment – unfinished)

=== Poetry ===
- 1919: The Song of the Child: An Idyll (Gesang vom Kindchen)
- 1923: Tristan and Isolde

=== Essays ===
- 1915: "Frederick and the Great Coalition" (Friedrich und die große Koalition)
- 1918: Reflections of a Nonpolitical Man (Betrachtungen eines Unpolitischen)
- 1922: "On the German Republic" (Von deutscher Republik)
- 1930: "A Sketch of My Life" (Lebensabriß) – autobiographical
- 1933: "The Suffering and Greatness of Richard Wagner" (Leiden und Größe Richard Wagners)
- 1937: "The Problem of Freedom" (Das Problem der Freiheit), speech
- 1938: The Coming Victory of Democracy – collection of lectures
- 1938: "This Peace" (Dieser Friede), pamphlet
- 1938: "Schopenhauer", philosophy and music theory on Arthur Schopenhauer
- 1940: "This War!" (Dieser Krieg!)
- 1943: Listen, Germany! (Deutsche Hörer!) – collection of radio broadcasts
- 1947: Essays of Three Decades, translated from the German by H. T. Lowe-Porter. [1st American ed.], New York, A. A. Knopf, 1947. Reprinted as Vintage book, K55, New York, Vintage Books, 1957. Includes "Schopenhauer"
- 1948: "Nietzsche's Philosophy in the Light of Recent History"
- 1950: "Michelangelo according to his poems" (Michelangelo in seinen Dichtungen)
- 1958: Last Essays. Includes "Nietzsche's Philosophy in the Light of Recent History"

=== Compilations in English ===
- 1922: Stories of Three Decades (trans. Helen Tracy Lowe-Porter). Includes 24 stories written from 1896 to 1922. First American edition published in 1936.
- 1963: Death in Venice and Seven Other Stories (trans. Helen Tracy Lowe-Porter). Includes: "Death in Venice"; "Tonio Kröger"; "Mario and the Magician"; "Disorder and Early Sorrow"; "A Man and His Dog"; "The Blood of the Walsungs"; "Tristan"; "Felix Krull".
- 1970: Tonio Kröger and Other Stories (trans. David Luke). Includes: "Little Herr Friedemann"; "The Joker"; "The Road to the Churchyard"; "Gladius Dei"; "Tristan"; "Tonio Kroger".
  - Republished in 1988 as "Death in Venice and Other Stories" with the addition of the eponymous story.
- 1997: Six Early Stories (trans. Peter Constantine). Includes: "A Vision: 'Prose Sketch'"; "Fallen"; "The Will to Happiness"; "Death"; "Avenged: 'Study for a Novella'"; "Anecdote".
- 1998: Death in Venice and Other Tales (trans. Joachim Neugroschel). Includes: "The Will for Happiness"; "Little Herr Friedemann"; "Tobias Mindernickel"; "Little Lizzy"; "Gladius Dei"; "Tristan"; "The Starvelings: A Study"; "Tonio Kröger"; "The Wunderkind"; "Harsh Hour"; "The Blood of the Walsungs"; "Death in Venice".
- 1999: Death in Venice and Other Stories (trans. Jefferson Chase). Includes: "Tobias Mindernickel"; "Tristan"; "Tonio Kröger"; "The Child Prodigy"; "Hour of Hardship"; "Death in Venice"; "Man and Dog".
- 2023: New Selected Stories (trans. Damion Searls). Includes: "Chaotic World and Childhood Sorrow"; "A Day in the Life of Hanno Buddenbrook" (excerpt from Buddenbrooks); "Louisey"; "Death in Venice"; "Confessions of a Con Artist, by Felix Krull—Part One: My Childhood". Review by Colm Tóibín
- Lesley Chamberlain writes that, because Mann's works "have come out of copyright in the US, and will do so in the UK from the start of 2026", "[m]y own translations of Death in Venice, and separately of three of the short stories, will appear soon after that date, to be followed by a new English version of Buddenbrooks". In addition, in 2024, Susan Bernofsky was reported to be working on a translation of The Magic Mountain, as was Simon Pare. Pare's translation was published in 2026, as was Ritchie Robertson's translation of Doctor Faustus and Mike Mitchell's translation of The Buddenbrooks.

== Research ==
=== Databases ===
The metadatabase TMI-Research brings together archival materials and library holdings of the network "Thomas Mann International". The network was founded in 2017 by the five houses Buddenbrookhaus/Heinrich-und-Thomas-Mann-Zentrum (Lübeck), the Monacensia im Hildebrandhaus (Munich), the Thomas Mann Archive of the ETH Zurich (Zurich/Switzerland), the Thomas Mann House (Los Angeles/USA) and the Thomo Manno kultūros centras/Thomas Mann Culture Centre (Nida/Lithuania). The houses stand for the main stations of Thomas Mann's life. The platform, which is hosted by ETH Zurich, allows research in the collections of the network partners across all houses. The database is freely accessible and contains over 165,000 records on letters, original editions, photographs, monographs and essays on Thomas Mann and the Mann family. Further links take you to the respective source databases with contact options and further information.
