= The Tables of the Law =

Novel by Thomas Mann

- First edition
- Author: Thomas Mann
- Translator: Helen T. Lowe-Porter (1945)
- Language: English (translated from German)
- Genre: Historical Fiction
- Publisher: Alfred A. Knopf
- Publication date: 1944
- Publication place: United States
- Media type: Print (Paperback)
- Pages: 120 pp
- OCLC: 296609
- Dewey Decimal: 833'.912-dc22
- LC Class: PT2625.A44G5 2010
- Preceded by: Listen, Germany!
- Followed by: Doctor Faustus

The Tables of the Law (German: Das Gesetz) is a 1944 novella by German writer Thomas Mann. It is a dramatic retelling of the Biblical story of Moses contained in the Book of Exodus, although some of the laws which Moses prescribes for his followers are taken from Leviticus. It was the only story that Mann was ever commissioned to write, and he finished it in just eight weeks, beginning on January 18, 1943, and ending on March 13, 1943. Publisher Armin L. Robinson, believing the Ten Commandments to be the basis on which civilization was founded, wanted to make a movie detailing the Nazis' "desecration of the Mosaic Decalogue". Instead, he settled on a book, entitled The Ten Commandments: Ten Short Novels of Hitler's War Against the Moral Code, with ten authors, one for each commandment. Mann's novella, which he was paid $1,000 to write, was originally meant to be the introduction to the volume, but Robinson liked it so much that he decided to make it the first story, under the heading "Thou Shalt Have No Other God Before Me". Mann considered his story to be greatly superior to that of his fellow contributors, and he considered the overall book a "failure".

== Differences from the Bible Story ==
Mann's story, while broadly faithful to the account given in Exodus, differs from it in several important ways:

- Instead of being the true son of Amram and Jochebed, Moses is portrayed as the son of the pharaoh's daughter and a passing Hebrew laborer. Sitting in her garden, the pharaoh's daughter sees the laborer and is overcome with desire. She orders him brought to her, and after having sex with him, she has him killed. It is only so as not to arouse the suspicion of her father that she places Moses in the care of his Biblical parents. Moses' half-Hebrew ethnicity plays an important role in the book, as Mann uses it to explain why God chose him for his task.
- Moses' lack of speaking ability is portrayed as deriving from his peripatetic lifestyle growing up. Mann writes, "[Moses] wasn't really at home in any language and when speaking would cast about in three: Aramaic Syro-Chaldean, which his father's blood kin spoke and which he had learned from his parents, had been overlaid by Egyptian, which he had had to acquire at school, and in addition Midianite Arabic, which he had spoken for many years in the desert."
- Many of Moses' miracles are given a secular explanation, and God's supernatural powers are never explicitly validated; at times Mann merely refers to certain occurrences as mysterious. For example, in explaining the miracle of turning a rod into a snake, Mann writes, "Aaron was accomplished in certain sleights-of-hand, which they hoped would make an impression at court to the glory of Yahweh. He could make a cobra stiff as a rod by pressing on its neck; but if he then cast the rod to the ground, it would curl and 'transform itself into a serpent'."
- Mann stipulates that Moses took a mistress while in the desert. She is simply referred to as "the Ethiopian," but is said to be from Kush. There is some textual evidence in the Bible for this, as Moses is described to have had an Ethiopian or Kushite wife, depending on the translation, in Numbers 12:1, but this may simply refer to his wife Zipporah.
- Joshua, portrayed as Moses' most loyal follower, visits Moses when he is on Mount Sinai and brings him food.
- Moses is not given the tablets containing the Ten Commandments by God. Instead, God tells him the laws, and Moses inscribes them in stone himself. This proves problematic as he does not want to write the Commandments in a written language which is inextricably linked to its (non-Hebrew) spoken counterpart. Instead, he invents a new system of writing (presumably Hebrew) which he describes as alphabetic, and inscribes the laws in this new script.
- Moses coats the lettering in his own blood, "pierc[ing] his strong arm with the graver and carefully smear[ing] the dripping blood into the letters so that they gleamed reddish in the stone."
- Just as in the Bible story, the first tablets break and Moses is forced to write them again. However, instead of merely dropping them, he smashes them in anger in an effort to destroy the golden calf.

== Interpretation ==
In his afterword to the 2010 English translation of book, Michael Wood suggests that Mann was not as fully devoted to Robinson's project as others. Wood begins by explaining that Robinson first wanted to put together the volume on the Ten Commandments when he heard that Adolf Hitler had ranted against the idea of commandments one evening to two of his associates, Joseph Goebbels and Julius Streicher. Wood argues that in fact by having his character Moses present the commandments as a black-and-white ethical code, Mann was disagreeing with Moses, and expressing a position that was not necessarily opposed to Hitler's. Wood writes, "[Mann's story] disturbingly echoes and complicates rather than simply refutes Hitler's views. Mann had read his Nietzsche too – and had read a lot more Freud than Hitler had."

== Bibliography ==
- Faber, Marion; Lehmann, Stephen (2010). Introduction. The Tables of the Law. By Mann, Thomas. Philadelphia: Paul Dry Books. ISBN 978-1-58988-057-3.
- Mann, Thomas (2010) [First published in German, 1944]. The Tables of the Law. Translated by Faber, Marion; Lehmann, Stephen. Philadelphia: Paul Dry Books. ISBN 978-1-58988-057-3.
- Wood, Michael (2010). Afterword. The Tables of the Law. By Mann, Thomas. Philadelphia: Paul Dry Books. ISBN 978-1-58988-057-3.
