= Kinderseele =

Literary work by Hermann Hesse

- Cover of the 12th edition (paperback version)
- Author: Hermann Hesse
- Language: German
- Genre: fiction, short stories
- Publisher: Die neue Rundschau
- Publication date: November 1919
- Publication place: Germany/Switzerland
- Pages: 80
- ISBN: 3-518-37703-5
- OCLC: 246710605

Kinderseele ("child-soul") is a short story written by Hermann Hesse. He wrote it between the end of 1918 and the beginning of 1919, at the age of 41. At that time Hesse lived in Bern, Switzerland, where he emigrated to after he had lost his father in 1916, and while his wife and one of his three sons had fallen seriously ill. In addition, he himself was under psychiatric treatment. Kinderseele was published in November 1919 in Die deutsche Rundschau under the pen name Emil Sinclair. It then appeared under his name in the anthology Klingsors letzter Sommer in 1920.

It has also given its name to an anthology of Hesse novellas and short stories.

== Plot summary ==
One day Emil Sinclair, an eleven-year-old boy, returns from school and as nobody is at home he goes upstairs into his father's room where he steals sugared and dried figs out of his dad's chest of drawers. Although he has pangs of conscience and thinks a lot about his deed, he does not confess it to his father. Sinclair pretends to have bought the figs at the cake shop in Calw. That is why his father punishes him by taking him there; but before entering the shop, the boy tells that he did not get them there. At home he finally admits that he stole the figs. The book ends with the phrase: "Als ich im Bett lag, hatte ich die Gewissheit, dass er mir ganz und vollkommen verziehen habe – vollkommener als ich ihm." ("As I lay in bed I had the certainty that he had completely forgiven me - more completely than I had him.")

Hesse himself made a comment on his book in a letter to his sister Adele, in which he stated that the way described in Kinderseele was one of extremely straight psychology and love of truth.

== Film, TV or theatrical adaptations ==
The film was made for Hermann Hesse's 100th anniversary in 1977. It is a Schmelzer-Stapenhorst production.

Actors:

- Hanno Schäfer (as Hermann Hesse),
- Gerd Böckmann (as Hesse's father),
- Barbara Oster (as Hesse's mother).
- Narrator: Dieter Borsche.
- Screenplay writer: Martin Schmelzer.
- Running time: 40 minutes.
