= Listen, Germany! =

- Cover of the first English language edition of Listen, Germany! (1943)
- Author: Thomas Mann
- Original title: Deutsche Hörer!
- Language: English
- Publisher: Alfred A. Knopf
- Publication date: 1943
- Publication place: United States

Listen, Germany! is a published collection of letters by exiled German author Thomas Mann to his former country during World War II. Originally published in 1943 by Alfred A. Knopf Inc., the collection contains twenty-five letters that were read over long and medium wave radio broadcasts by the BBC German Service into Nazi Germany, as part of the Allied propaganda effort, from October 1940 to August 1943.

The German-language original, Deutsche Hörer! ("German listeners!" — this is how each of the texts begins), was first published in 1942 by H. Wolff, New York, but it never reached Germany. A second edition was published in Stockholm in 1945, after the war. This edition included the addresses Mann had given through November 8, 1945.

== Edition ==
- Thomas Mann: Deutsche Hörer! Radiosendungen nach Deutschland aus den Jahren 1940-1945, 4th edition (Fischer: Frankfurt am Main, 2004) (ISBN 3-596-25003-X).
