= Little Herr Friedemann =

1896 short story by Thomas Mann

Little Herr Friedmann
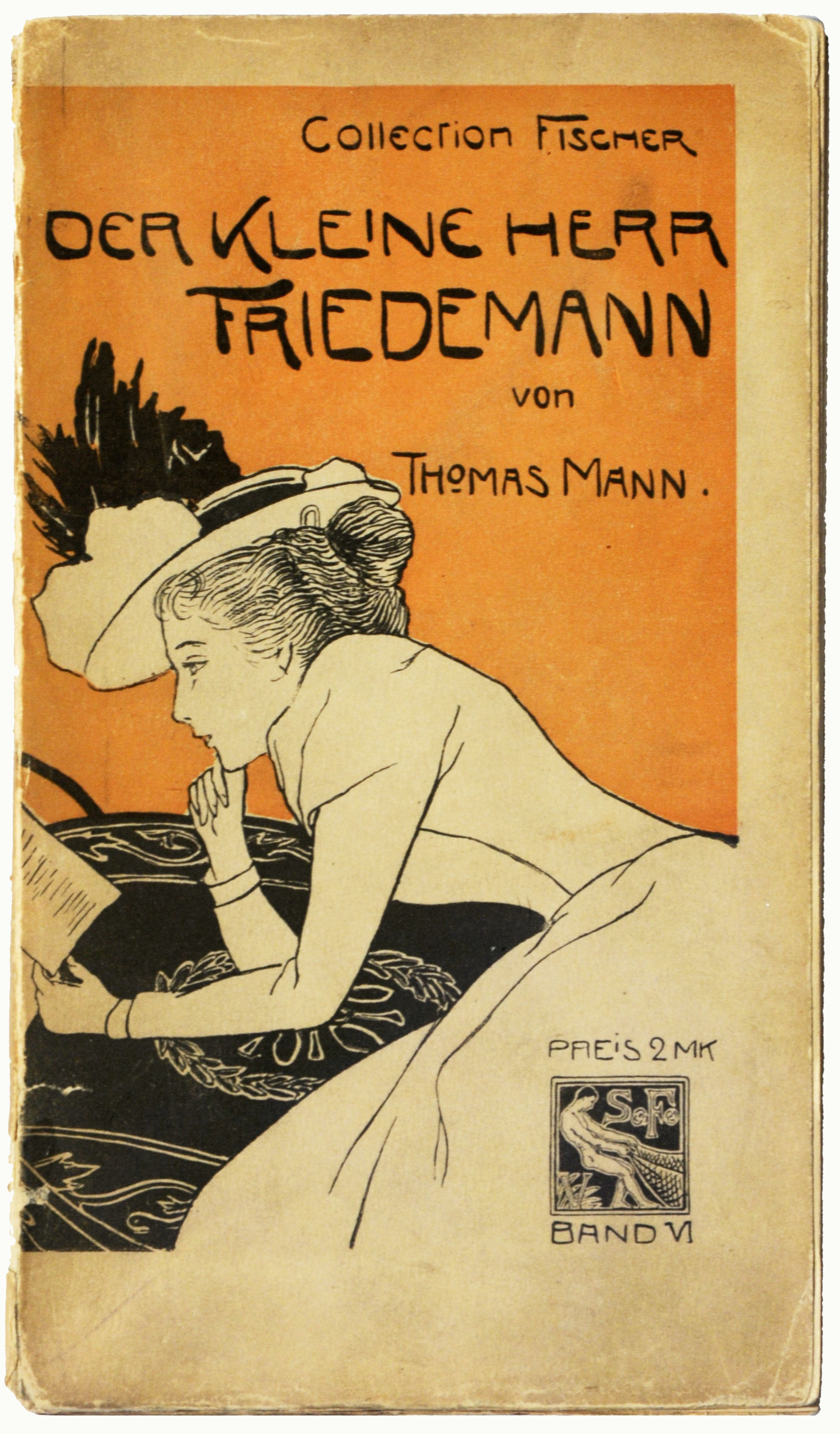
- First edition, original booklet
- Author: Thomas Mann
- Original title: Der kleine Herr Friedemann
- Language: German
- Genre: Short Story
- Published: 1896
- Publication place: Germany
- Pages: 33
- ISBN: 9780140033984

"Little Herr Friedemann" (German: Der kleine Herr Friedemann) is a short story by Thomas Mann. It initially appeared in 1896 in Die neue Rundschau, and later appeared in 1898 in an anthology of Mann's short stories entitled collectively as Der kleine Herr Friedemann.

"Little Herr Friedemann" reflects a Naturalist predilection for unpleasant themes. In the work is present the author's typical parodistic opening where he uses sophisticated detachment and understatement to make the sad fate of a child at the hands of his nurse seem tragicomic. Also present is the hero's public confession before his descent into madness.

This short story explores Ibsen's idea of a life-sustaining lie. Here it is present in Herr Friedemann trying to live out a life without a romantic relationship, by taking pleasure in art and nature.

== Plot and characters ==
=== Plot summary ===
The story begins abruptly, as the family's alcoholic nurse drops one-month-old Johannes Friedemann from the changing table while the mother and three daughters are away. The main character is thus a marked man, a hunchback, not a writer or artist as in some other works by Thomas Mann. He grows up deformed and hunchbacked. He falls in love as a young boy with a girl, only to find her kissing another behind a hedge. He then swears off love dedicating himself to self-improvement. The result is a person of calm resignation, taking pleasure in music and literature.

Friedemann grows into a man with taste, interested in music, clothes and literature. He is successful in his career and seemingly content. Soon, a military commander with a personable wife is stationed in Herr Friedemann's town. Frau Commandant von Rinnlingen destroys Herr Friedemann's seeming contentment. He falls in love with her on first sight, despite her lack of, what Mann describes as, classic beauty.

Herr Friedemannn and Frau von Rinnglingen make a deep connection, despite the brevity of their encounters and the constraints of society. Herr Friedemann confesses to Frau von Rinnglingen that, after meeting her, he has realized his life thus far has been a lie; he was only imagining happiness, but was not happy. Frau von Rinnglingen tells him this was brave and admits to knowing similar sadness. He confesses his love to her; she pauses, then breaks away from him laughing. Friedemann drowns himself in a river.

Some characters and locations of the story reappear in changed contexts in Mann's novel Buddenbrooks. The theme of the story is recast with a very different leading character and a less dramatic conclusion in Mann's short story "The Dilettante".

=== Major characters ===
- Herr Johannes Friedemann – The hunchbacked main character, based in part on two characters: the Greek god Hephaestus, with whom he shares a physical disability, as well as connection to the color red (Friedemann's stockings). His hunchback may have been inspired by the hunchbacked apothecary from Theodor Fontane's Effi Briest, whom Mann greatly respected. Friedemann attempts to live a life of detachment from love and of aesthetic appreciation.
- Frau Gerda von Rinnlingen – The wife of the Colonel Commandant, described as cold, cruel and indifferent. Although frequently described as a femme fatale, she is not a constantly seductive woman who destroys the usual life of the protagonist. Despite her cruel actions toward him at the end of novel, Friedemann's failures and death aren't caused by her, but by himself.

== Major themes ==
=== Expectations of love ===
The cause for their mutual attraction is however not the same. Gerda seeks psychic and physical satisfaction in the romantic sense, while Herr Friedemann is seeking a mother, in a sense. This can first be noticed in the theater, where they meet for the second time. She is pushing her lower lip out, and has a slight decolletage which fully shows her full bosom. Furthermore, she takes off the glove of her left hand and keeps it in view of Herr Friedemann for the duration of the show. He reacts in a childlike way, by sucking on a finger and caressing his breast. Her attempts are the result of the Colonel's impotence according to Dr. Freud, which is the reason why she is without a child after four years of marriage. A double-entendre by asking him to play his violin in a duet with her, but having no experience with women, which he renounced as a child he merely blushes and looks away. This leads her to believe that he is impotent as well which is why, just as she looks past her husband when he walks into the room, she looks at him with expressionless eyes, instead of looking at him with a sinister glitter ... quizzically and firmly. This is seen in the last scene as well, after his confession of love. She does not bend forward in a maternal comfort, but backwards in response to a perceived sexual advance. She acknowledged his handicap earlier, but would overlook it because of his fierce ardor. When he doesn't act further she, just as with her husband, she looks straight ahead, over him, into the distance, which is denying his existence because of his impotence.

=== Existentialism ===
Modern interpretations of the story have seen an existential theme in the narrative as well. At four critical junctions in the short story, Friedmann is put under the gaze of Frau von Rinnlingen, which puts him in a state of emotional distress, as it causes Friedmann to become intensely aware of himself. The four instances when this occurs are: seeing her arriving to town in a carriage, meeting her in her house, seeing her at the opera, and in the final scene of the story. It is under Gerda's gaze that Friedmann loses his cultivated self, making a love confession in an emotional, incoherent and inarticulate state. The gaze is most acutely felt when it isn't present, that is, when Gerda looks past him. His suicide appears as such to be motivated by his seeing himself with her own eyes, as he becomes aware of the sheer messiness of all existence, as well as of his own existence, which provokes a sense of nausea. Additionally, the laughter heard at the end of the novel, following Friedmann's suicide, emphasizes how the self is at constant mercy of others' gaze: exposed to ridicule, shame and scorn.

== Criticism ==
Ethel Lorinda Peabody finds it artistically perfect, especially the little nature descriptions placed at key moments. For example, after the night in opera, Herr Friedemann awakens with a feeling of calm and confidence to which the nature attunes, with the birds twittering and the sky shining blue. Again at the moment of his suicide the crickets stop chirping, but soon enough resume, and the quiet sound of laughter can be heard. She finds the story not unusual, but finds that the style and simple language stand out with vividness.

== English translations ==
- H. T. Lowe-Porter (1936)
- David Luke (1988)
- Joachim Neugroschel (1998)
