= Lotte in Weimar: The Beloved Returns =

1939 novel by Thomas Mann

- First US edition
- Author: Thomas Mann
- Original title: Lotte in Weimar
- Language: German
- Publisher: Gottfried Bermann Fischer (Stockholm); Secker & Warburg (UK); Knopf (US)
- Publication date: 1939
- Publication place: Germany
- English publication date: 1940
- Media type: Print (Hardback & Paperback)
- Pages: 342 (hardback edition)

Lotte in Weimar: The Beloved Returns, otherwise known as Lotte in Weimar (German: [ˈlɔ.tə ɪn ˈvaɪ.̯maʁ]) or The Beloved Returns, is a 1939 novel by Thomas Mann. It is a story written in the shadow of Johann Wolfgang von Goethe; Mann developed the narrative almost as a response to Goethe's novel The Sorrows of Young Werther, which is more than 150 years older than Lotte in Weimar. Lotte in Weimar was first published in English in 1940.

== Plot summary ==
The Beloved Returns is the story of one of Goethe's old romantic interests, a real historical figure by the name of Charlotte Kestner née Buff, who has come to Weimar to see him again after more than 40 years of separation. Goethe had romanced Charlotte when they were young, but she had already been engaged (and then married) to another man whom she truly loved. Ultimately, the romance ended unconsummated; afterwards, Goethe wrote a fictional depiction of these events, with some artistic changes, and published it under the title The Sorrows of Young Werther—a still famous book, which brought early renown to Goethe. The real Charlotte became inadvertently and unwillingly famous, and remained so for the rest of her life to a certain degree.

Her return in some ways is due to her need to settle the "wrongs" done to her by Goethe in his creation of Werther; one of the underlying motifs in the story is the question of what sacrifices both a "genius" and the people around him/her must make to promote his/her creations, and whether Goethe remained distanced even to friends and family members, exploited others' talents and sympathy, and was ultimately guided only by his interests. Most of the novel is written as dialogues between Charlotte and other residents of Weimar, who give their own opinions on the issue of Goethe's genius. Only in the last third of the book, starting with the internal monologue in the seventh chapter, is the reader finally directly confronted with Goethe and what he himself thinks of the entire affair.

Lotte in Weimar echoes in subtle ways both Mann's respect for and his demythologizing approach to Goethe.

== Quotation at the Nuremberg Trials ==
On 27 July 1946 Hartley Shawcross, Chief Prosecutor for the UK at the Nuremberg Trial of the Major War Criminals, at the end of his final argument, told the International Military Tribunal:

"Years ago Goethe said of the German people that some day fate would strike them ...

... would strike them because they betrayed themselves and did not want to be what they are. It is sad that they do not know the charm of truth, that mist, smoke, and berserk immoderation are so dear to them, pathetic that they ingenuously submit to any mad scoundrel who appeals to their lowest instincts, who confirms them in their vices and teaches them to conceive nationalism as isolation and brutality."

With what a voice of prophecy he spoke—for these are the mad scoundrels who did those very things."

Later Shawcross expressed his hope that by the judgement of the court could in the future

"those other words of Goethe be translated into fact, not only, as we must hope, of the German people but of the whole community of man:

... thus ought the German people to behave: giving and receiving from the world, their hearts open to every fruitful source of wonder, great through understanding and love, through mediation and the spirit-thus ought they to be; that is their destiny."

Within a few days, the British press was commenting that these were not Goethe's words at all but words put into his mouth by Thomas Mann in the seventh chapter of his novel Lotte in Weimar. On 16 August 1946 Mann, then living in Pacific Palisades, California, received a letter from the British ambassador in Washington inquiring “whether you put the words into Goethe’s mouth or whether they are an actual quotation from the latter’s works. If they do represent an actual quotation, I should be very glad if you could let me know in which work they appear. It is, of course, possible that they are a passage from a contemporary or later commentator. Should this be the case, perhaps you would be good enough to say where you got them from.”

Mann answered the ambassador: "It is true, the quoted words do not appear literally in Goethe's writings or conversations; but they were conceived and formulated strictly in his spirit and although he never spoke them, he might well have done so." For Goethe's monologue in the novel many quotations had been "modified and variegated for poetic purposes.” On the other hand, the monologue contained much which Goethe had never said but was so much in line with what one knew of his thinking that it could be called authentic. Therefore, in a higher sense the words the British prosecutor had used were indeed Goethe's.

In his The Story of a Novel: The Genesis of Doctor Faustus Thomas Mann later explained that already during the war a few copies of Lotte in Weimar had been smuggled into Germany from Switzerland and that opponents of the regime had distributed a compilation of excerpts from the monologue in the seventh chapter under the camouflage title “From Goethe’s Conversations with Riemer”. A copy or a translation had come into the hands of Sir Hartley Shawcross, who, finding its content striking, in good faith had used it extensively in his final argument.

== Release details ==
- 1939, Sweden, Bermann-Fischer, 1939, hardback (first edition)
- 1940, UK, Secker & Warburg, 1940, hardback (Eng. trans. by H. T. Lowe-Porter, first edition)
- 1940, US, Albert A. Knopf, 1940, hardback (US Eng trans. first edition)
- 1990, US, Univ. of California Press ISBN 0-520-07007-0, November 1990, paperback

== Film adaptation ==
The novel was filmed in 1974 by Egon Günther, with Lilli Palmer in the title role.
