= Tonio Kröger =

1901 novella by Thomas Mann

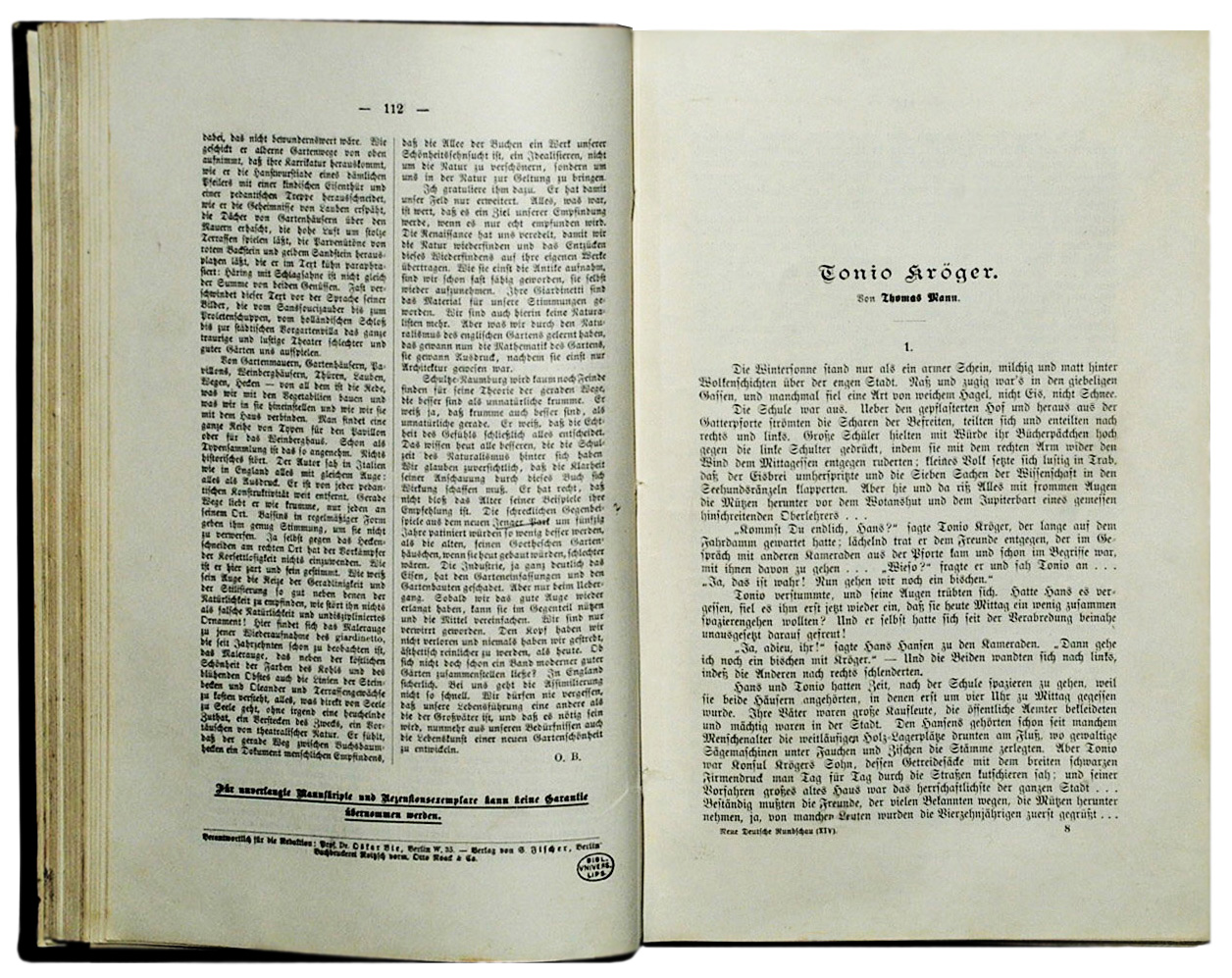
- First edition
- Author: Thomas Mann
- Original title: Tonio Kröger
- Translator: Frederick Alfred Lubich
- Language: German
- Genre: Autobiographical novel
- Publication date: 1903
- Publication place: Germany
- English publication date: 1936
- Media type: Print
- OCLC: 3512222
- Text: Tonio Kröger at Internet Archive

Tonio Kröger (German: [ˈtoːni̯o ˈkʁøːɡɐ]) is a novella by Thomas Mann, written early in 1901, when he was 25. It was first published in 1903. A. A. Knopf in New York published the first American edition in 1936, translated by Helen Tracy Lowe-Porter.

== Plot summary ==
The narrative follows the course of a man's life from his schoolboy days to his adulthood. The son of a north German merchant and a "Southern" mother (Consuelo) with artistic talents, Tonio inherited qualities from both sides of his family. As a child, he experiences conflicting feelings for the bourgeois people around him. He feels both superior to them in his insights and envious of their innocent vitality. This conflict continues into Tonio's adulthood, when he becomes a famous writer living in southern Germany. "To be an artist," he comes to believe, "one has to die to everyday life." These issues are only partially resolved when Tonio travels north to visit his hometown. While there, Tonio is mistaken for an escaped criminal, which reinforces his inner suspicion that the artist must be an outsider relative to "respectable" society. As Erich Heller—who knew Thomas Mann personally—observed, Tonio Kröger's theme is that of the "artist as an exile from reality" (with Goethe's Torquato Tasso [1790] and Grillparzer's Sappho [1818] for company). Yet it was also Erich Heller who, earlier, in his own youth, had diagnosed the main theme of Tonio Kröger to be the infatuation and entanglements of a passionate heart, destined to give shape to, intellectualize, its feelings in artistic terms.

== Connection to other works ==
Tonio Kröger forms a pair with the more famous story, Death in Venice (Der Tod in Venedig). They both describe the life of an artist and express Thomas Mann's views on art. In one story the artist travels from south to north, in the other from north to south. One journey ends in a tenuous reconciliation, and the other in death. But, as T. J. Reed has pointed out,

"In Der Tod in Venedig, Thomas Mann returns from excursions into allegory and once more writes directly about a literary artist. But the directness is not that of Tonio Kröger. There he was expressing lyrically his immediate experience, formulating and coming to terms with what he had gone through...."

Thus the importance of the work lies, chiefly, in its autobiographical character, as well as in its contribution, through the description of an amitié particulière, to the theory of love. It's about first love, the "passion of innocence", as Mann called it in a letter to a former classmate. It was only in old age that Mann revealed in this letter that Tonio Kröger's passionate admiration for his handsome, blonde classmate Hans Hansen was modeled on Mann's own admiration for his real classmate from Lübeck, Armin Martens.

The novel was made into a film in 1964, directed by Rolf Thiele.

== English translations ==
- H. T. Lowe-Porter (1936)
- David Luke (1988)
- Joachim Neugroschel (1998)
- Jefferson S. Chase (1999)

== See also ==
- Júlia da Silva Bruhns, Thomas Mann's mother, inspiration for Consuelo, Tonio's mother.
