= Neue Rundschau =

Quarterly literary magazine in Germany

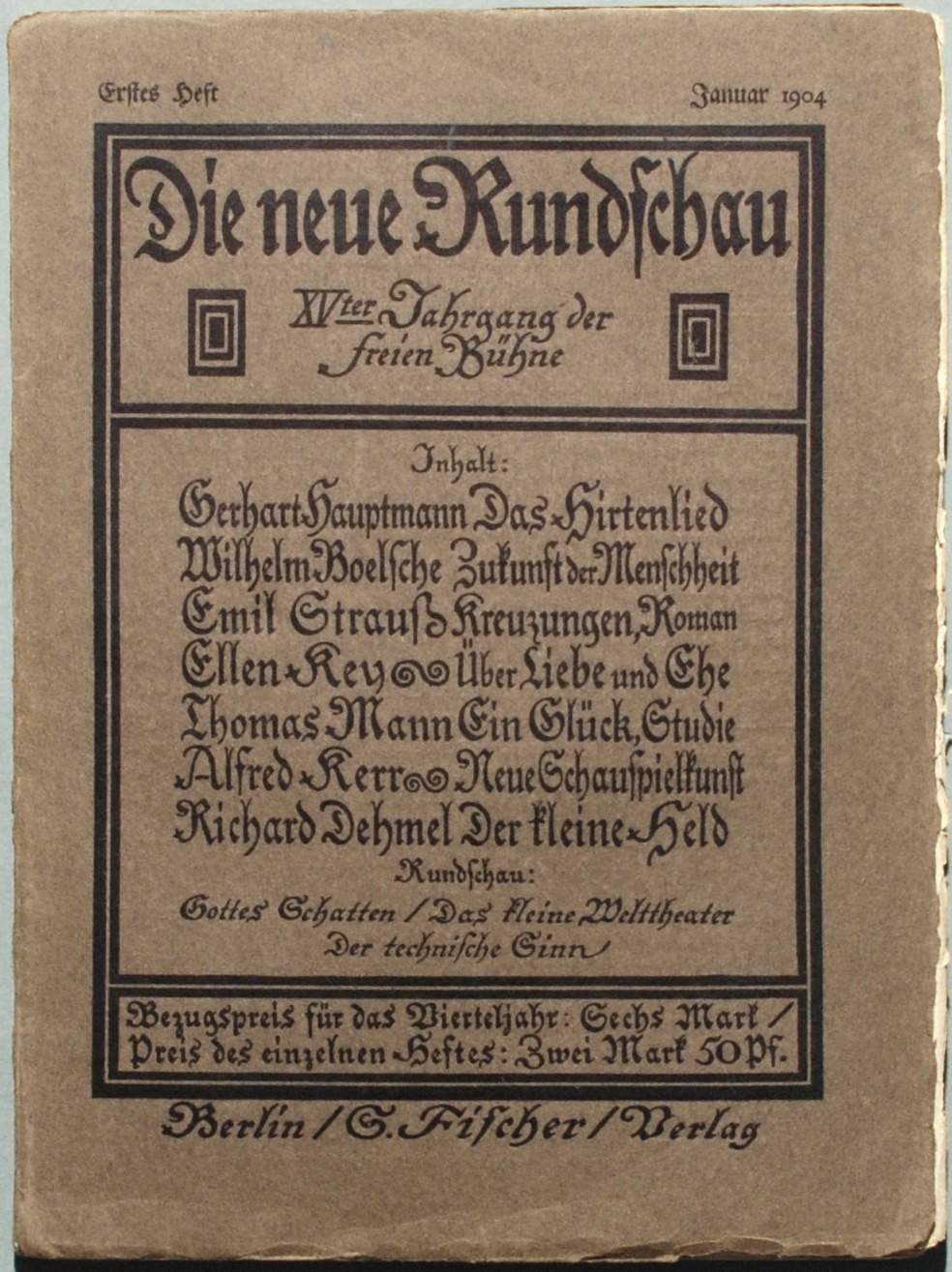
- 1904 edition
- Categories: Literary
- Frequency: Quarterly
- Publisher: S. Fischer Verlag
- Founder: Otto Brahm; Samuel Fischer
- Founded: 1890 (as Freie Bühne für modernes Leben, Free Stage for Modern Life); 1945 restarted in Stockholm (banned 1944 in Nazi Germany)
- Country: Germany
- Based in: Berlin
- Language: German

The Neue Rundschau, formerly Die neue Rundschau (German: [diː ˈnɔʏ.ə ˈʁʊntˌʃaʊ]), founded in 1890, is a quarterly German literary magazine that appears in the S. Fischer Verlag. With its over 100 years of continuous history, it is one of the oldest cultural publications in Europe.

== History ==
The theater critic Otto Brahm and the publisher Samuel Fischer founded the magazine in 1890 as Freie Bühne für modernes Leben (Free Stage for Modern Life). They wanted to provide a weekly platform for new development in art such as naturalism. In practice, the journal was not limited to one art form. The weekly also addressed topics about theatre. In 1892, it was renamed to an art form. After discussions about the artistic focus of the magazine, it was renamed for the first time in Freie Bühne für den Entwickelungskampf der Zeit (Free Stage for the Struggle for Development of the Time), shifting to more popular content and to monthly publication. Otto Julius Bierbaum took over as editor of the magazine in 1893 and named it Neue Deutsche Rundschau. Due to differences with Samuel Fischer he gave up the post after four months.

From 1894 to 1922, Oskar Bie was the editor. In 1904 he succeeded in renaming it Die neue Rundschau. The magazine became one of the most important forums for modern literature and essay writing in the German Empire and the Weimar Republic. Due to the link to the S. Fischer-Verlag, the publisher's major writers were able to publish their works in first prints. Alfred Kerr and Robert Musil were among the reviewers. From 1919 to 1921, Alfred Döblin wrote for the magazine under the pen-name Linke Poot ("Left Paw").

Bie was succeeded by Rudolf Kayser and in 1932 by Peter Suhrkamp. Under the Nazis, the magazine was banned in late 1944. Gottfried Bermann-Fischer re-established it in 1945 in exile in Stockholm.

Neue Rundschau is based in Berlin and is published on a quarterly basis.

== Content ==
Each issue of the quarterly has a thematic focus, to which writers, scientists and philosophers contribute. Furthermore, national and international writers are discussed, also the translations of literary texts.

== First prints of literature ==
The magazine published several first works of literature; authors included Rainer Maria Rilke and Arthur Schnitzler. Thomas Mann's short story "Der kleine Herr Friedemann" was published in 1896. The 1904 title shows Gerhart Hauptmann's "Das Hirtenlied", Wilhelm Boelsche's "Zukunft der Menschheit", the novel Kreuzungen by Emil Strauß, Ellen Key's "Über Liebe und Ehe", Mann's "Ein Glück", Alfred Kerr's "Neue Schauspielkunst" and Richard Dehmel's "Der kleine Held". Hermann Hesse's "Kinderseele" was first printed in 1919. Musil wanted to publish Franz Kafka's "The Metamorphosis" in 1914 which was considered too long, but Kafka's story "A Hunger Artist" appeared in 1922.

== Literature ==
- Freie Bühne für modernes Leben (Repr. Krauss, Nendeln Liecht., also Mikrofichausgabe) (in German). Berlin: S. Fischer. January 1890 – February 1891. ISSN 0932-2523.
- Freie Bühne für den Entwickelungskampf der Zeit (in German), Berlin: S. Fischer, ISSN 0932-2515
- Neue deutsche Rundschau (Freie Bühne) (in German), Berlin: S. Fischer, ISSN 0932-2507
- Neue Rundschau (in German), Frankfurt am Main: S. Fischer, ISSN 0028-3347
- Wolfgang Grothe, Historische Kommission des Börsenvereins des Deutschen Buchhandels (ed.), "Die Neue Rundschau des Verlages S. Fischer", Archiv für Geschichte des Buchwesens (in German), no. 4.1961/63, München: Saur, col. 809–995, ISSN 0066-6327
- Wilhelm Bölsche (2010), Gerd-Hermann Susen (ed.), Briefwechsel. Mit Autoren der Freien Bühne (in German), vol. Werke und Briefe. Wissenschaftliche Ausgabe. Werke. Briefe I, Berlin: Weidler, ISBN 978-3-89693-266-2
- Oliver Pfohlmann; Dörte Hartung, Freie Bühne: Neue Rundschau (1890 bis heute) (in German)
