= Nicholas Wahl =

American historian (1928–1996)

Anthony Nicholas Maria Wahl (June 7, 1928 – September 13, 1996) was an American historian.

Born in New York to Jewish Hungarian immigrant parents, he had an academic career encompassing Harvard, Princeton and New York University, focusing on French politics, particularly those of the Fifth French Republic, and on the political career of Charles de Gaulle.

He married Sandy Walcott in 1964, but their marriage was dissolved in 1988. The same year, he married British artist Charlotte Johnson, the former wife of Stanley Johnson, and the daughter of Sir James Fawcett; through her, he was the stepfather of Boris, Rachel, Leo and Jo Johnson.

He died of cancer in London, at the age of 68.
