= Amelia Gentleman =

British journalist (born 1972)

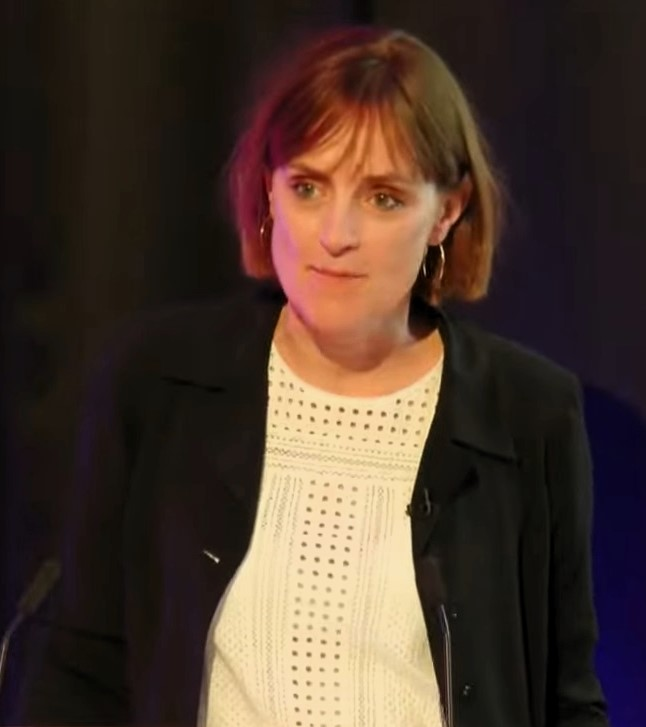
- Gentleman speaks at the British Library in 2022.
- Born: 1972 (age 53–54); London, England
- Education: Wadham College, Oxford
- Occupation: Journalist
- Employer: The Guardian
- Spouse: Jo Johnson (m. 2005)
- Children: 2
- Parents: David Gentleman (father); Susan Evans (mother)
- Relatives: Tom Gentleman (paternal grandfather); George Ewart Evans (maternal grandfather); Stanley Johnson (father-in-law); Charlotte Johnson Wahl (mother-in-law); Boris Johnson (brother-in-law); Rachel Johnson (sister-in-law); Carrie Symonds (sister-in-law); Julia Johnson (half sister-in-law)
- Awards: 2012 Orwell Prize Winner for Journalism; 2017 Press Awards Specialist Writer of the Year; 2018 Paul Foot Award

Amelia Sophie Gentleman (born 1972) is a British journalist. She is a reporter for The Guardian, and won the Paul Foot Award in 2018 for reporting the Windrush scandal.

== Early life and education ==
Born in London in 1972, Gentleman is the daughter of the artist David Gentleman and his second wife Susan Evans, daughter of George Ewart Evans.

Gentleman was educated at St Paul's Girls' School, an independent day school, before studying Russian and History at Wadham College, Oxford.

== Career ==
Earlier in her career, Gentleman was the New Delhi correspondent for the International Herald Tribune and the Paris and Moscow correspondent for The Guardian. Since 2009, she has been in London, writing features for The Guardian, mainly looking at the impact of government policy.

For six months, Gentleman worked for The Guardian on the story of the Windrush scandal, the deportation of people originally from British colonies in the Caribbean, or elsewhere in the Commonwealth, who legally had a right of residence in the UK. According to Sara El-Harrak, writing for the openDemocracy website, the issue had previously been neglected by the British media. The scandal broke in April 2018 and within weeks led to the resignation of the Conservative Home Secretary, Amber Rudd. Gentleman won the 2018 Paul Foot Award for her work on the Windrush story. She was also named as the Political Studies Association's journalist of the year for 2018, with Carole Cadwalladr, and as journalist of the year in the British Journalism Awards, 2018.

== Personal life ==
Gentleman met Jo Johnson, former MP for Orpington, while at Oxford University in 1991. They married in 2005 and live in Camden. The couple have two children.

== Awards ==
- 2007 Amnesty International Hong Kong Human Rights Press Awards
- 2007 Ramnath Goenka Prize for Best Foreign Correspondent
- 2010 Press Awards Feature Writer of the Year
- 2012 Orwell Prize Winner for Journalism
- 2017 Press Awards Specialist Journalist of the Year
- 2018
  - Paul Foot Award
  - Political Studies Association Journalist of the Year (joint award with Carole Cadwalladr)
  - Journalist of the Year, British Journalism Awards
- 2019
  - The Cudlipp award for Windrush investigation
  - The Amnesty impact award for Windrush investigation
  - Print journalist of the year, London press club
  - Sue Lloyd Roberts media award, in association with UNHCR and Migrants Organise
  - Best campaigning/investigative journalism, Drum online media awards

=== Books ===
- The Windrush Betrayal, Exposing the Hostile Environment, Guardian Faber, longlisted for the Baillie Gifford Prize 2019
