= James Lowenstein =

American diplomat (1927–2023)

James Gordon Lowenstein (August 6, 1927 – January 3, 2023) was an American diplomat who was the U.S. Ambassador to Luxembourg from 1977 to 1981. He was the co-founder of the French-American Foundation, with James Chace and Nicholas Wahl.

== Early life ==
Lowenstein was born in Long Branch, New Jersey on August 6, 1927. He attended Yale College and joined the State Department after receiving his degree.

== Vietnam ==
He first visited Vietnam in 1967, in the midst of the Vietnam War as a staffer for the United States Senate Committee on Foreign Relations. During this trip and his five-week trip in 1969, he came to the conclusion that the war was far from being won. His report of his travels was influential on the committee chairman and was eventually leaked to the press.
