= The Magic Mountain =

1924 novel by Thomas Mann

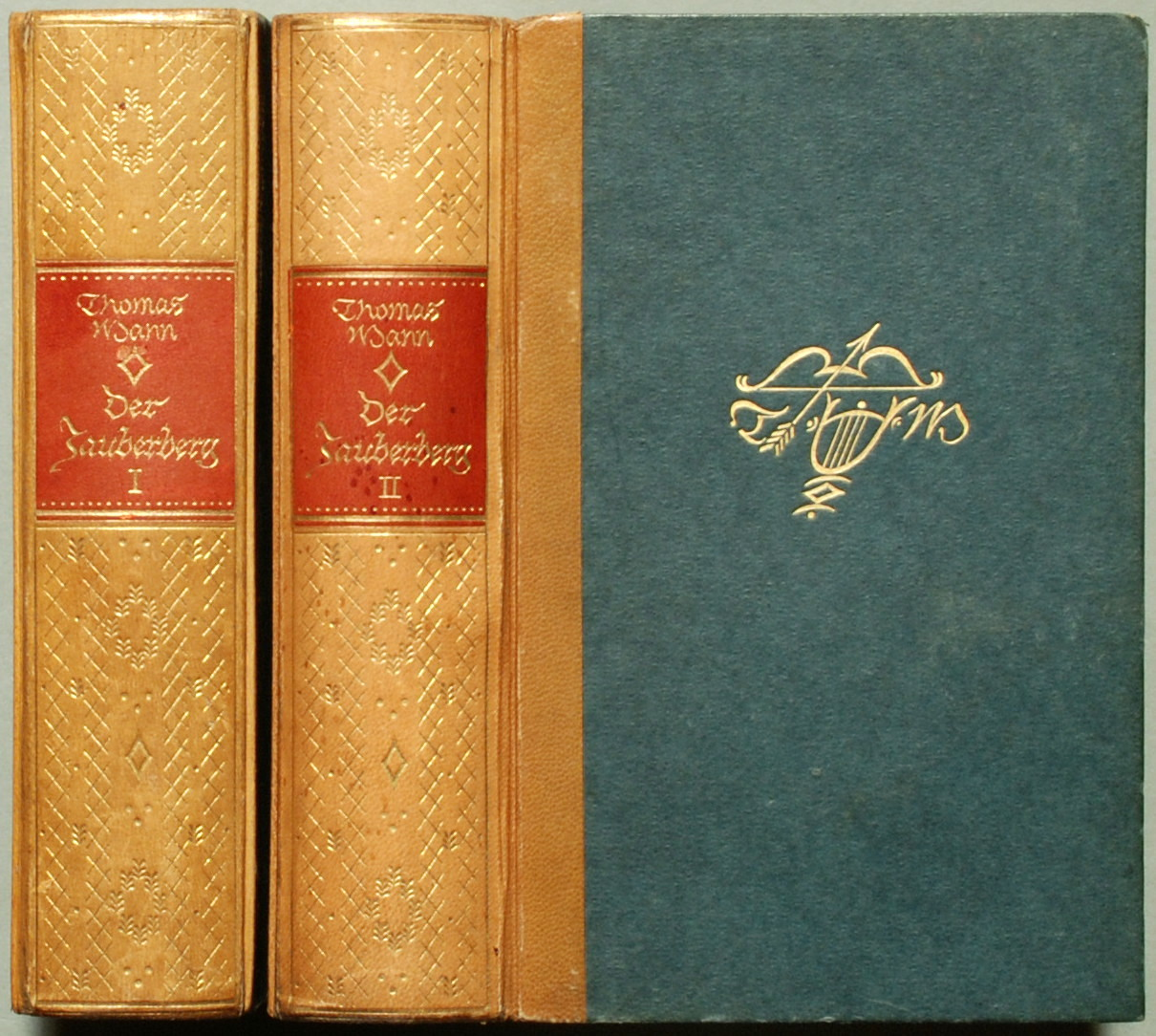
- First German edition (1924)
- Author: Thomas Mann
- Original title: Der Zauberberg
- Translator: Helen Tracy Lowe-Porter
- Language: German, with some French
- Genre: Bildungsroman, modernist novel
- Publisher: S. Fischer Verlag, Alfred A. Knopf
- Publication date: 1924
- Publication place: Weimar Republic
- English publication date: 1927
- OCLC: 30704937

The Magic Mountain (German: Der Zauberberg, pronounced [deːɐ̯ ˈtsaʊbɐˌbɛʁk]) is a German novel written by Thomas Mann, published in November 1924 about a young and aspiring engineer Hans Castorp. While staying in the secluded world of a high-altitude sanatorium in the years leading up to 1914, Hans encounters otherworldly figures who confront him with politics, philosophy, but also romance, illness, and death. Enchanted by his love for a woman he meets in the sanatorium, which prompts him to reflect on an early and formative schoolboy romance, he stays considerably longer than originally planned.

The novel was inspired by the conditions at a sanatorium in Davos, which the author had visited in 1912 while caring for his wife, who was suffering from tuberculosis.

The Magic Mountain was republished in several editions and translated into numerous languages.

== Background ==
Mann began developing his first ideas for The Magic Mountain in 1912. He initially conceived it as a novella that would revisit aspects of his earlier work Death in Venice in a more humorous manner. The new project was shaped by his wife's residence at Dr. Friedrich Jessen's Waldsanatorium in Davos, Switzerland, while she was being treated for suspected tuberculosis. In numerous letters to him (many of which are now lost), she described everyday life in the sanatorium. In a three-week visit in May and June of 1912, Mann experienced the place first-hand and became acquainted with the doctors and patients. According to an afterword later included in the English translation of the novel, this stay inspired the opening chapter, "Arrival".

The outbreak of World War I disrupted his work on the book. Like many other Germans of the time, Mann initially supported the German Empire and the war effort. During what he described as a state of "sympathy with death", together as part of the intellectual military service that he regarded as his duty, he wrote the essays Gedanken im Kriege (Thoughts in Wartime), Gute Feldpost (Good News from the Front), and Friedrich und die große Koalition (Frederick and the Great Coalition).

In response to anti-war intellectuals, Mann wrote a book-length essay, Reflections of a Nonpolitical Man, which was published in 1918. His position, however, was challenged by other intellectuals, such as his older brother, Heinrich Mann, who, unlike Thomas, did not support the German state. Heinrich was the author of the satirical novel Der Untertan and the essay "Zola", which defended the idea of Germany's inevitable defeat as the path to democratization. Yet, the end of the war led Thomas Mann to rethink his position. In 1919, Thomas Mann changed the tone of the novel that would become The Magic Mountain to reflect the realities of war rather than its romanticized depiction. He introduced conflicts between the characters, which drew on his relationship with Heinrich.

Mann later became interested in studying European bourgeois society. He explored the sources of much of civilized humanity's destructive nature and speculated about personal attitudes toward life, health, illness, sexuality, and mortality. His political stance during this period shifted from opposition to the Weimar Republic, to support for it. Mann eventually published The Magic Mountain (as Der Zauberberg) through the publisher S. Fischer Verlag in Berlin.

== Plot summary ==
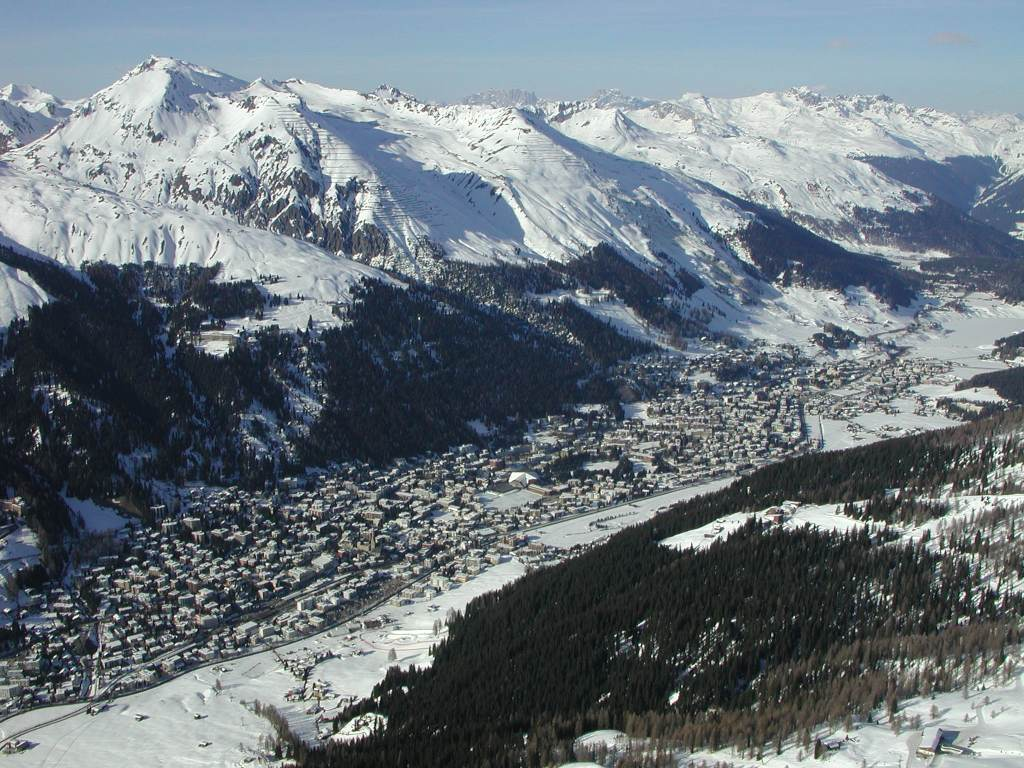
A picture of mountain scenery at Davos, the novel's Alpine setting

The narrative opens in 1904, a decade before the outbreak of World War I. The protagonist, Hans Castorp, was the only child of a Hamburg merchant family. Following the early death of his parents, Castorp was raised by his grandfather, Hans Lorenz Castorp, and later by his great-uncle, Tienappel. In his early twenties, Castorp is about to take up a shipbuilding career in his hometown of Hamburg. Before beginning work, he undertakes a journey to visit his cousin, Joachim Ziemssen, who is seeking a cure for his tuberculosis in The Berghof, a sanatorium in Davos, high in the Swiss Alps. Castorp leaves his familiar life and obligations, in what he later calls "the flatlands," to visit the rarefied mountain air and introspective small world of the sanatorium.

Castorp repeatedly postpones his plans to leave the sanatorium as his health deteriorates. What at first appears to be a minor bronchial infection with a slight fever is later diagnosed by the sanatorium's chief doctor and director, Hofrat (Note: Hofrat (literally, court advisor) is an honorific title given by monarchs or, as in this case, their family members to people of merit. It is not his title as director of the sanatorium, which is 'Director'. However, the novel mirrors the then-German custom to call Hofräte by their honorific rather than their functional title. The 1996 English translator of The Magic Mountain, John E. Woods, translates the word as 'Director'.) Behrens, as symptoms of tuberculosis. Castorp is persuaded by Behrens to stay until his health improves.

During his extended stay, Castorp meets various characters, including Lodovico Settembrini, an Italian humanist, encyclopaedist, and student of Giosuè Carducci; Leo Naphta, a Jewish Jesuit who favors communist totalitarianism; Mynheer Pieter Peeperkorn, a Dionysian Dutchman; and Castorp's romantic interest, Madame Claudia Chauchat.

Castorp eventually remains at the sanatorium for seven years. When World War I breaks out, Castorp volunteers for military service. The novel concludes with the suggestion that he may not survive the battlefield.

== Literary influence and criticism ==
Scholars have interpreted The Magic Mountain as both a classic example of the European Bildungsroman—a novel of psychological or moral development—and as a satire of this genre. Many formal characteristics of the Bildungsroman are present: the protagonist begins in a state of immaturity and, after leaving his home environment, is exposed to art, culture, politics, human vulnerability, and love. Yet, writes Morten Høi Jensen,

The Magic Mountain inverts the premises of the bildunsroman in that Hans Castorp is "seduced away from the practical activity of the world" at the same time that it fulfills those same premises, since Hans Castorp would not have explored ideas had he returned to Hamburg and become an engineer instead.

The novel explores themes such as the experience of time, music, nationalism, sociology, and changes in the natural world. Through Castorp's stay in the rarefied atmosphere of "The Magic Mountain", the narrative provides a view of pre-World War I European civilization and the underlying tensions of the era.

The novel explores the subjective experience of serious illness and the gradual process of medical institutionalization, as well as the irrational forces within the human psyche, reflecting the contemporary rise of Freudian psychoanalysis. These themes relate to the development of Castorp's character over the period covered by the novel. In his discussion of the work, written in English and published in The Atlantic in January 1953, Mann states that "what [Castorp] came to understand is that one must go through the deep experience of sickness and death to arrive at a higher sanity and health...".

Mann also acknowledged his debt to the skeptical insights of Friedrich Nietzsche concerning modern humanity, which he drew from when creating conversations between the characters. Throughout the book, the author employs the discussions among Settembrini, Naphta, and the medical staff to introduce the young Castorp to a wide spectrum of competing ideologies that emerged from the Age of Enlightenment. While a classical Bildungsroman would conclude with Castorp having become a mature member of society, with his worldview and greater self-knowledge, The Magic Mountain ends with Castorp becoming one of millions of anonymous conscripts likely to be under fire on a World War I battlefield.

== Major themes ==
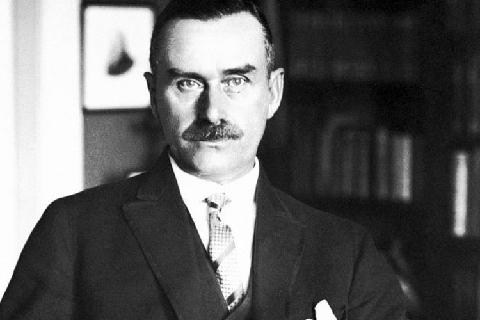
Mann in 1926

=== Illness and death ===
The Berghof patients suffer from various forms of tuberculosis, which dictate their daily routines, thoughts, and conversations as members of the "Half-Lung Club" ("Verein Halbe Lunge"). The disease ends fatally for many of the patients, such as the Catholic girl, Barbara Hujus, whose fear of death is heightened in Chapter III during a harrowing Viaticum scene, and Castorp's cousin Ziemssen, who dies like an ancient hero. The dialogues between Settembrini and Naphta examine life and death from a metaphysical perspective. In addition to deaths from illness, two characters commit suicide. Ultimately, Castorp leaves to fight in World War I, where his likely death is implied.

In the above-mentioned comment, Mann writes:

What Castorp learns to fathom is that all higher health must have passed through illness and death... As Castorp once said to Madame Chauchat, there are two ways to life: One is the common, direct, and brave. The other is bad, leading through death, and that is the genius way. This concept of illness and death, as a necessary passage to knowledge, health, and life, makes The Magic Mountain into a novel of initiation.

=== Time ===
The novel follows a chronological structure with a non-linear pace, the first seven months out of the seven-year plot being narrated across almost half of the book. This structure reflects the decoupling of perception from physical time, with Castorp's days blending into one another as he slowly grows accustomed to the pace and routine of the sanatorium. The overall narrative draws possible parallels to Henri Bergson's concepts of duration and subjective time experience.

Throughout the book, the characters discuss the philosophy of time and debate whether "interest and novelty dispel or shorten the content of time, while monotony and emptiness hinder its passage." The characters also reflect on the problems of narration and time, about the correspondence between the length of a narrative and the duration of the events it describes, while Chapter VII opens with the narrator directly questioning the possibility of narrating time itself.

Mann also meditates upon the interrelationship between the experience of time and space; of time seeming to pass more slowly when one does not move in space. This aspect of the novel mirrors contemporary philosophical and scientific debates, which are embodied in Heidegger's writings and Albert Einstein's theory of relativity, in which space and time are inseparable. In essence, Castorp's subtly transformed perspective on the "flat-lands" corresponds to a movement in time.

=== Magic and mountains ===
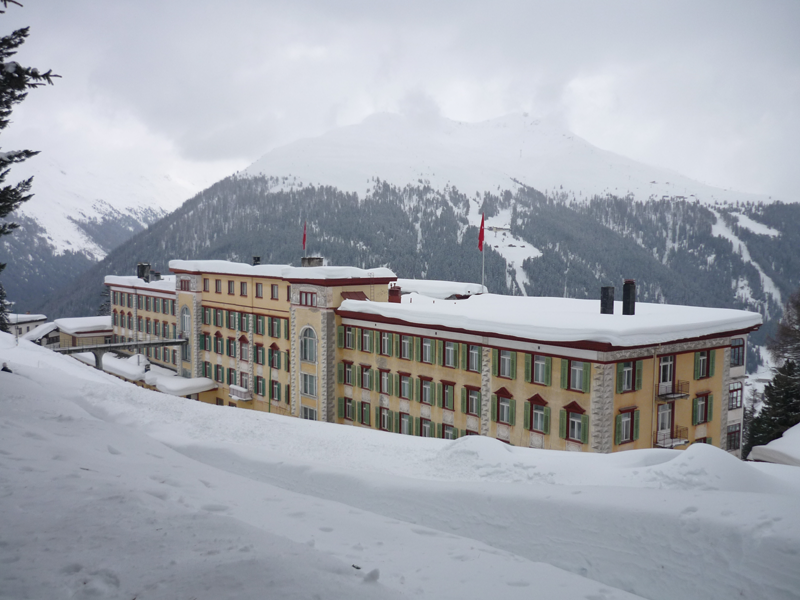
Berghotel Sanatorium Schatzalp, near the setting for most of the novel

The titular reference to "mountain" reappears in many layers. The Berghof sanatorium is located on a mountain, both geographically and figuratively, a separate world. The mountain also represents the opposite of Castorp's home, the sober, business-like "flatland".

The first part of the novel culminates and ends in the sanatorium Carnival feast. There, in a grotesque scene named after Walpurgis Night, the setting is transformed into the Blocksberg, where according to German tradition, witches and wizards meet in obscene revelry. This is also described in Goethe's Faust I. At this event, Castorp woos Madame Chauchat; their subtle conversation is carried on almost wholly in French.

Another topos of German literature is the Venus Mountain (Venusberg), which is referred to in Richard Wagner's opera Tannhäuser. This mountain is a "hellish paradise", a place of lust and abandon, where time flows differently: the visitor loses all sense of time. Castorp, who planned to stay at the sanatorium for three weeks, does not leave the Berghof for seven years.

In general, the inhabitants of the Berghof spend their days in a mythical, distant atmosphere. The x-ray laboratory in the cellar represents the Hades of Greek mythology, where Medical Director Behrens acts as the judge and punisher Rhadamanthys and Castorp a fleeting visitor, like Odysseus. Behrens compares the cousins to Castor and Pollux; Settembrini compares himself to Prometheus. Frau Stöhr also mentions Sisyphus and Tantalus, although confusedly.

The culmination of the second part of the novel is perhaps the – still "episodic" – chapter of Castorp's blizzard dream (in the novel simply called "Snow"). The protagonist finds himself in a sudden blizzard, beginning a death-bound sleep, dreaming at first of beautiful meadows with blossoms and of lovable young people at a southern seaside, then of a scene reminiscent of a grotesque event in Goethe's Faust I ("the witches' kitchen", again in Goethe's "Blocksberg chapter"), and finally ending with a dream of extreme cruelty – the slaughtering of a child by two witches, priests of a classic temple. According to Mann, this represents the original and deathly destructive force of nature itself.

Castorp awakens in due time, escapes from the blizzard, and returns to the Berghof. But rethinking his dreams, he concludes that "because of charity and love, man should never allow death to rule one's thoughts". Castorp soon forgets this sentence, so for him, the blizzard event remains an interlude. This is the only sentence in the novel that Mann highlighted in italics.

There are frequent references to Grimms' Fairy Tales, based on European myths. The opulent meals are compared to the magically self-laying table of "Table, Donkey, and Stick"; Frau Engelhardt's quest to learn the first name of Madame Chauchat mirrors that of the queen in "Rumpelstiltskin". Castorp's given name is the same as "Clever Hans". Although the ending is not explicit, it is possible that Castorp dies on the battlefield. Mann leaves his fate unresolved.

Mann makes use of the number seven, often believed to have magical qualities: Castorp was seven when his parents died, he stays seven years at the Berghof, from the years 1907 to 1914, the central Walpurgis Night scene happens after seven months, both cousins have seven letters in their last name, the dining hall has seven tables, Madame Chauchat is initially assigned room number 7, the digits of Castorp's room number (34) add up to seven, and Joachim's room is a multiple of seven (28=7×4), Settembrini's name includes 'seven' (sette) in Italian, Joachim keeps a thermometer in his mouth for seven minutes, and Mynheer Peeperkorn announces his suicide in a group of seven, Joachim decides to leave after a stay of seven times seventy days and dies at seven o'clock. The novel itself, moreover, is divided into seven chapters.

=== Music ===
Mann gives a central role to music in this novel. People at the Berghof listen to "Der Lindenbaum" from Winterreise played on a gramophone. This piece is full of mourning in the view of death and hints at an invitation to suicide. In the book's final scene, Castorp, now an ordinary soldier on Germany's western front in World War I, hums the song to himself as his unit advances in battle.

=== Allegorical characters ===
Mann uses the novel's main characters to introduce Castorp to the ideas and ideologies of his time. The author observed that the characters are all "exponents, representatives, and messengers of intellectual districts, principles, and worlds," and hoped that he had not made them mere wandering allegories.

==== Castorp ====
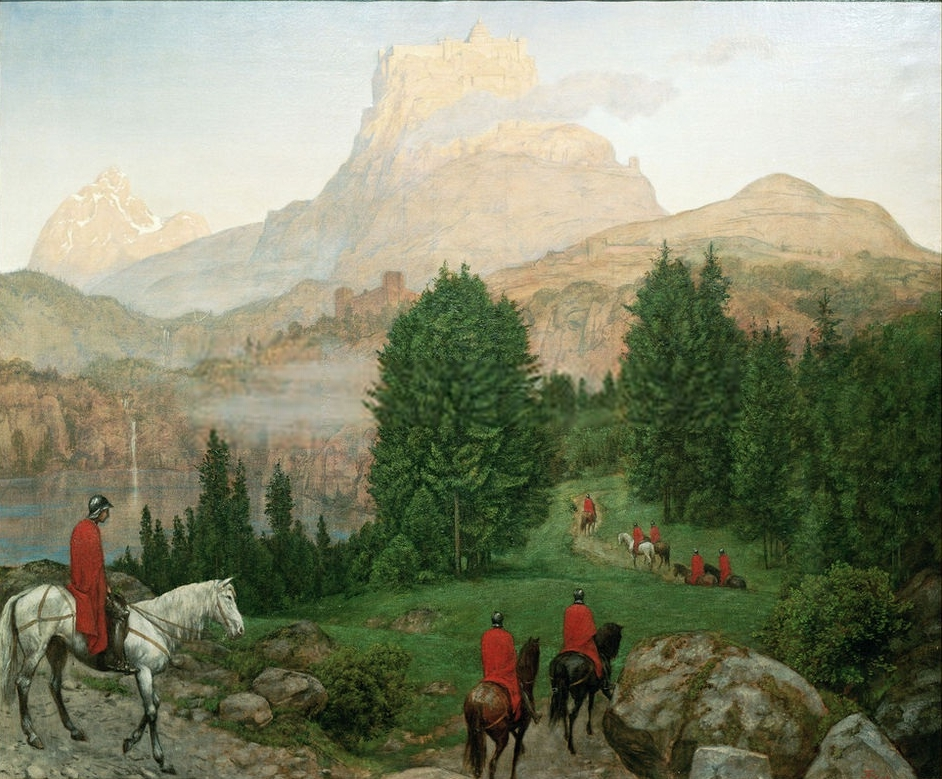
Parzival: knights ascend to the Grail Castle

According to Mann, the protagonist is a questing knight, the "pure fool" looking for the Holy Grail in the tradition of Parzival. The character is often interpreted as representing the German bourgeoisie of the era, exposed to and torn between the conflicting influences of humanism, philistinism, and radical ideologies.

As usual, Mann chooses his protagonist's name carefully: 'Hans' is a generic German first name, almost anonymous, but also refers to the fairy tale figure of "Hans im Glück" and the apostle St. John (Johannes in German), the favorite disciple of Jesus, who beholds the Revelation (Offenbarung des Johannes in German). Castorp is the name of a historically prominent family in Mann's hometown, Lübeck, which provided at least three generations of Mayors for the town in the era of the Renaissance. The "torp" is Danish, not unexpected on the German north coast. Castorp also refers to the twins Castor and Pollux in Greek mythology, who were identified by the New Testament scholar Dennis MacDonald as models for the apostles James and John.

Castorp can be understood as the incorporation of the young Weimar Republic. Humanism and radicalism, represented by Settembrini and Naphta, try to win his favour, but Castorp is unable to decide. His body temperature is a subtle metaphor for his lack of clarity: Following Schiller’s theory of fever, Castorp’s temperature is 37.6 °C (99.7 °F), which is neither healthy nor ill, but an intermediate point. Furthermore, the outside temperature in Castorp's residence is out of balance: it is either too warm or too cold and tends to extremes (e.g., snow in August), but never normal.

The most pronounced instance of Thomas Mann's political conversion is in the "Schnee" (snow) chapter. Completed in June 1923, this chapter, which forms the philosophical heart of the novel, attempts to overcome apparent contrasts and find a compromise between Naphta's and Settembrini's positions. In the chapter "Humaniora", written three years prior, Castorp tells Behrens, in a discussion on medical matters, that an interest in life means an interest in death. In the "Schnee" chapter, Castorp comes to exactly the opposite conclusion.

The basis for Castorp's contradiction can be found in the speech "On the German Republic" (Von Deutscher Republic), written in the previous year, in which Mann outlines his position with regards to the precedence of life and humanity over death. Even though Castorp could not possibly have learned from either Naphta or Settembrini the idea that the experience of death is ultimately that of life and leads to a new appreciation of humanity, Mann was determined from at least September 1922 onwards to make this message the main point of his novel.

In a letter of 4 September 1922 to Arthur Schnitzler, Mann refers to "Von deutscher Republik", in which, he says, he is endeavoring to win the German middle classes over to the cause of the Republic and humanitarian concerns, and adds that his new-found passion for humanitarianism is closely related to the novel on which he is working. In the climax of the "Schnee" chapter, Castorp's vision is of the triumph of life, love, and human concern over sickness and death. This realization corresponds closely to Mann's key observation in "Von deutscher Republik". As if to dispel any lingering doubts, Mann makes the meaning absolutely clear in his "Tischrede in Amsterdam" [Dinner speech in Amsterdam], held on 3 May 1924. Death stands for the ultra-conservative opponents of the Republic, while life embodies the supporters of democracy, the only way to guarantee a humanitarian future.

The "Schnee" chapter was written in the first half of 1923 and the italicization of the key sentence was probably requested by Mann when the book was set in print in 1924, as a message to the readers of the time, who, after years of hyper-inflation and political turmoil, not only expected but also desperately needed a positive direction to their lives, some words of wisdom which would give them hope.

==== Settembrini: Humanism ====
Settembrini articulates the ideals of The Enlightenment, of humanism, democracy, tolerance and human rights. He often finds Castorp literally in the dark and switches on the light before their conversations. He compares himself to Prometheus of Greek mythology, who brought fire and enlightenment to Man. His own mentor, Giosuè Carducci, has even written a hymn to another lightbringer: Lucifer, "la forza vindice della ragione." His ethics are grounded in bourgeois values and the virtue of labour. He attempts to steer Castorp away from his preoccupation with death and disease and his attraction to Madame Chauchat, advocating instead for a life-affirming worldview.

His antagonist Naphta describes him as "Zivilisationsliterat", meaning cosmopolitan, un-German intellectuals. Mann originally constructed Settembrini as a caricature of the liberal-democratic novelist represented, for example, by his own brother Heinrich Mann. However, while the novel was being written, Mann himself became an outspoken supporter of the Weimar Republic, precipitated by the assassination of then German Foreign Minister Walther Rathenau whom Mann deeply admired, which may explain why Settembrini, especially in the later chapters, becomes the "Sprachrohr des Autors" (the voice of the author).

==== Naphta: Radicalism ====
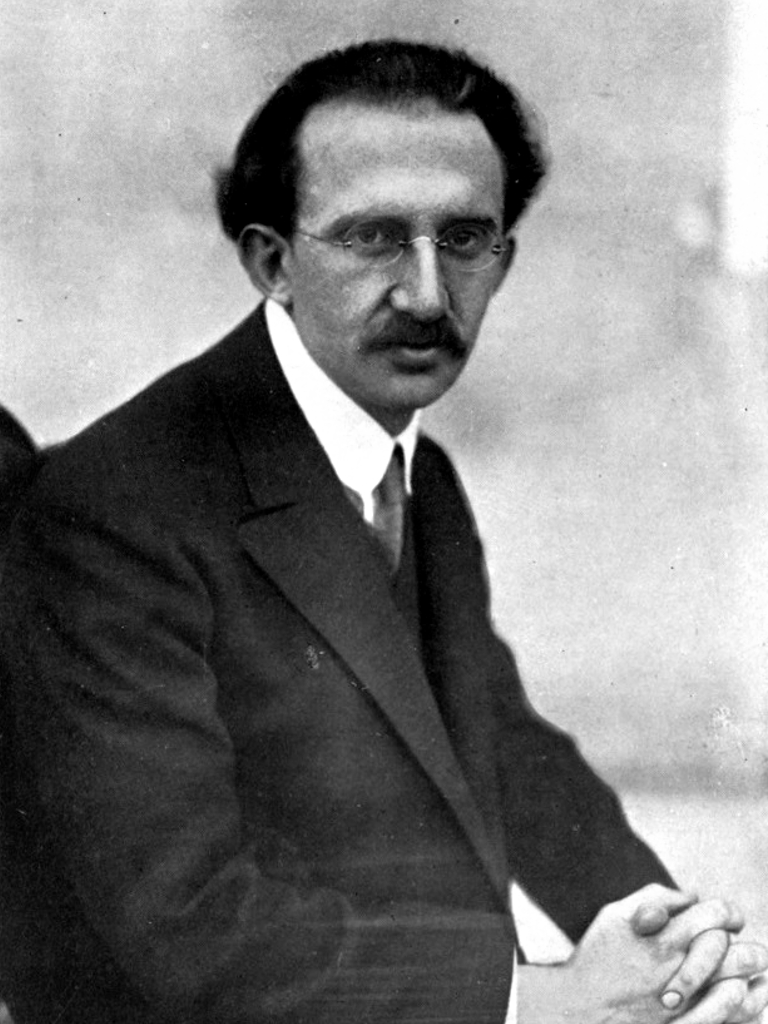
George Lukács's Hegelian Marxism and Communist zealotry inspired the fanatical Jesuit Naphta, who was also a Hegelian communist.

Settembrini's antagonist Naphta was Jewish but joined the Jesuits and became a Hegelian Marxist. The character was a parody of the philosopher Georg Lukács, who wrote that he "plainly has not recognized himself in Naphta" in a 1949 letter to Mann.

Even here a change in Mann's political stance can be seen. In "Operationes spirituales" from Chapter VI, written towards the end of 1922, Naphta is termed a "revolutionary" and "socialist", but Settembrini sees Naphta's fantasies as emanating from an anti-humanitarian reactionary revolution ("Revolution des antihumanen Rückschlages"). In this chapter, the terrorism championed by Naphta is no longer, in Castorp's eyes, associated solely with the "Diktatur des Proletariats", but also with conservative Prussian militarism and Jesuitism. The association here between Naphta's advocacy of terrorism and two extremely conservative movements – Prussian militarism and Jesuitism – is a huge political shift for the novel. Terrorism, until now viewed as exclusively the province of the communist revolution, is suddenly also an instrument of reactionary conservatism. In a clear allusion on Mann's part to the assassination of Walther Rathenau, Naphta goes into the motivation of the revolutionary who killed Councillor of State August von Kotzebue in 1819 and concludes that it was not just the desire for freedom at stake, but also moral fanaticism and political outrage. That this is a direct reference to the death of Rathenau is borne out by the fact that in the first edition Mann refers to the shooting of Kotzebue, whereas he was in fact stabbed. Alerted to this mistake by Max Rieger, Mann replied on 1 September 1925 that he would rectify the error at the first opportunity. Mann changed the word geschossen to erstochen for future editions. For the 1924 readership, however, the association with Rathenau could not have been clearer.

==== Chauchat: Love and temptation ====
Clawdia Chauchat is frequently interpreted as embodying erotic temptation and a less disciplined approach to life. The novel's narration describes her with terms such as 'Asiatic-flabby', associating her with a decadent or 'morbid' allure that contrasts with Settembrini's rationalism. She is one of the major reasons for Castorp's extended stay on the magic mountain. The female promise of sensual pleasure as a hindrance to male zest for action imitates the themes from the Circe mythos and in the nymphs in Wagner's Venus Mountain. Chauchat's feline characteristics are noted often, her last name is derived from the French chaud chat [hot cat], and her first name includes the English 'claw'. (Her name may also be a reference to the Chauchat machine gun, a French weapon that saw significant use by the French and American forces during World War I.) Chauchat could also be a play on words with 'chaud' [hot] and 'chatte' [female genitalia] in French slang.

Clawdia Chauchat leaves the Berghof for some time, but she returns with an impressive companion, Mynheer Peeperkorn, who suffers from a tropical disease.

==== Peeperkorn: The Dionysian principle ====
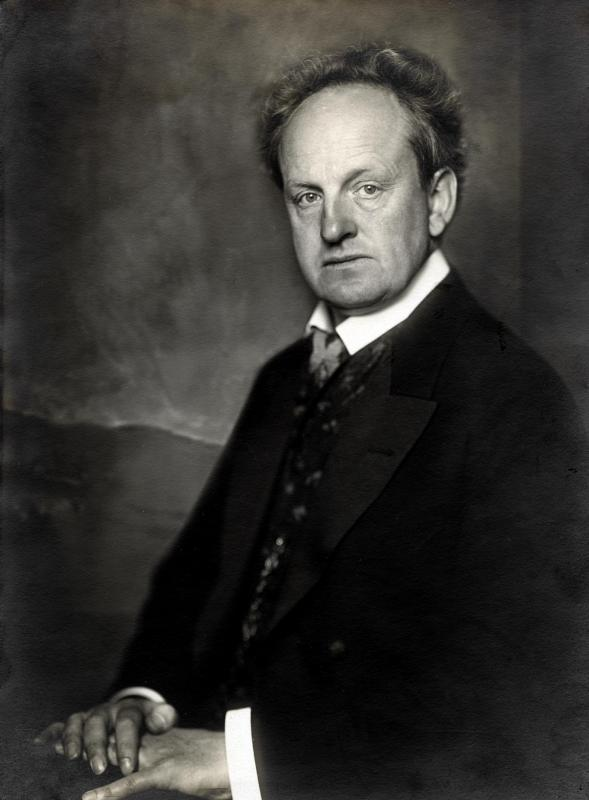
Gerhart Hauptmann

Mynheer Peeperkorn, Clawdia Chauchat's new lover, enters the Berghof scenery late, but he is one of the most commanding characters in the novel. His behaviour and personality, with its flavour of importance, obvious awkwardness, and inability to complete a statement, are reminiscent of certain figures in earlier novellas of the author (e.g., Herr Klöterjahn in Tristan) – figures, who are, on the one hand, admired because of their vital energy and, on the other hand, condemned because of their naïveté. In total, this person represents the grotesqueness of a Dionysian character. The Greek god Dionysus is also important in Nietzschean philosophy, whose The Birth of Tragedy is the source of the title The Magic Mountain.

Peeperkorn ends his life by suicide, also performed in a strange manner.

Mynheer Peeperkorn was used by the author to personify his rival, the influential German poet Gerhart Hauptmann, and even certain aspects of Goethe (with whom Hauptmann often was compared). "One scholar has postulated that the character of Mynheer Peeperkorn... who revels in lavish meals... was intended as a mirror image of Kafka's hunger artist..."

==== Ziemssen: Duty ====
Joachim Ziemssen, Castorp's cousin, is described as a young person representing the ideals of loyalty and faithfulness as an officer. As already mentioned, Dr. Behrens alludes to the pair as "Castor(p) and Pollux", the twin brothers of Greek mythology. And in fact, there is some affinity between the two cousins, both in their love to Russian women (Clawdia Chauchat in the case of Castorp, the female co-patient "Marusja" in the case of Joachim Ziemssen) and also in their ideals. But, in contrast to Castorp, who is an assertive person on the Berghof scene, Joachim Ziemssen is rather shy, known to stand somehow outside of the community. He tries to escape from what he unspokenly feels to be a morbid atmosphere. After long discussions with his cousin, and in spite of being warned by Dr. Behrens, he returns to the "flatlands", where he fulfills his military duties for some time. But after a while he returns to the Berghof, forced by the deterioration of his lungs. It is, however, too late for a successful treatment of his illness, and he dies in the sanatorium. His death is described in a moving chapter of the novel, with the title "As a soldier, and a good one" [(Ich sterbe) als Soldat und brav], again a well-known citation from Goethe's Faust.

== In popular culture ==
The Magic Mountain is mentioned in the film The Wind Rises (2013), directed by Hayao Miyazaki, by a German character named Hans Castorp.

The Magic Mountain is mentioned on p. 369 of Hernán Díaz's 2022 novel Trust.

The Magic Mountain is also mentioned on p. 30 in the 1982 Nobel Prize. Laureate Gabriel Garcia Marquez's title Memories of My Melencholy Whores.

Nobel Laureate Czesław Miłosz borrowed the title for his poem, "A Magic Mountain".

The novel is mentioned in The Dick Van Dyke Show episode "That's My Boy??" (season 3, episode 1). With all the mix-ups at the hospital between the Petries and the Peters, and each getting the other's stuff, Rob is trying to determine if he and Laura brought home the right baby, so he goes to check the baby's footprints, which he tells his neighbour are kept in The Magic Mountain. "Huh?" says Jerry. "The book", says Rob. Jerry finds the footprints and reads the book's title, "Oh, Thomas Mann", and then they cover the kid's foot with blue ink.

The 2016 psychological horror film A Cure for Wellness was inspired by Mann's novel.

The Empusium: A Health Resort Horror Story, the 2022 novel by Nobel Prize laureate Olga Tokarczuk, is said to be "part homage and part rejoinder" to The Magic Mountain.

To mark the 100th anniversary of The Magic Mountain, German author Heinz Strunk published the 2024 novel Zauberberg 2 ("Magic Mountain 2"). Strunk's book is a modern interpretation of Mann's original work and set in the present day.

=== Films ===
- Der Zauberberg, a German black-and-white TV production in 1968 by Sender Freies Berlin.
- The Magic Mountain, released as a feature film in 1982 and as an extended three-part television miniseries in 1984.

== Translations into English ==
- The Magic Mountain, translated by H. T. Lowe-Porter with an afterword by the author (London: Secker and Warburg, 1927 SBN 436-27237-2).
- The Magic Mountain, translated by John E. Woods (New York: Knopf 1995 ISBN 0-679-77287-1). This won the Helen and Kurt Wolff Translator's Prize in 1996.
- The Magic Mountain, translated by Simon Pare (Oxford, 2026 ISBN 9780198889175)
- The Magic Mountain, translated by Susan Bernofsky (W. W. Norton, forthcoming)
