= Praxis (human rights charity) =

UK-based human rights charity

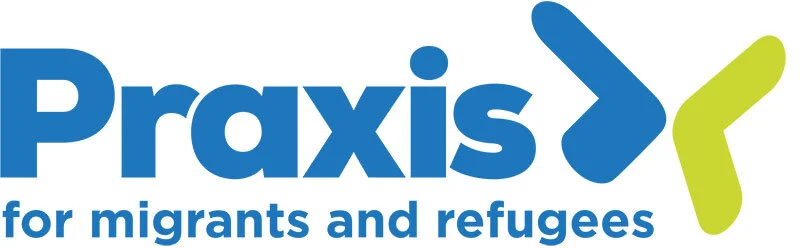
- Official logo
- Predecessor: The Robert Kemble Christian Institute
- Formation: 6 June 1983
- Headquarters: Pott Street, London E2 0EF
- Chief Executive: Minnie Rahman
- Website: https://www.praxis.org.uk/

Praxis is a London-based human rights charity. It has worked on migrant justice in the UK since 1983. Its projects provide specialist legal advice and welfare support. Praxis also works with organisations across the UK to shape policy and public opinon. It has widely been recognised for helping to expose the Windrush Scandal.

== Current work ==
- Legal advice: free immigration advice in London.
- Community groups: peer-led work.
- Influencing and campaigning: for migrant rights.
- Interpreting: Written and spoken interpretation services.
- Training: For professionals who want to support migrants in the UK.

== History ==
=== Origins ===
The charity was first known as The Robert Kemble Christian Institute. It was established 6 June 1983 following the death of the Reverend Robert Kemble, a minister of the United Reformed Church who did outreach work with displaced people in London. Initial funding was bequeathed by Reverend Kemble's will. Praxis was registered as a company in 1998 and took over all activities of The Robert Kemble Christian Institute from 1999.

=== Past projects and work ===
==== 1990s ====
- Kairos Europa: In the wake of the 1992 Maastricht Treaty, Praxis co-organised a ‘People's Parliament’ in Strasbourg.
- Rwandan community: After the 1994 Rwandan genocide Praxis hosted weekly groups for Rwandan children to learn the language of their parents whilst adults discussed the political situation and how to respond with advocacy work.
- Sudanese community: From 1996 Sudanese scholars, activists, and other diaspora members met at Praxis for two decades to discuss human rights and advocacy work in Sudan during its dictatorship.

==== 2000s ====
- Praxis Panthers football club: formed in the early 2000s for young asylum seekers and refugees.
- National Accreditation Training: In 2004 this scheme was launched for overseas qualified nurses and midwives.

== The Windrush Scandal ==
Praxis was credited for helping to uncover the Windrush scandal. In the 2010s, the charity's work with destitute and homeless migrants identified a trend whereby people who had lawfully lived in the UK for decades were being "locked out" from welfare benefits, healthcare, employment, and accommodation on the basis that they could not prove their residence status. Praxis supported victims and raised awareness in the media whilst working closely with British journalist Amelia Gentleman and national and international media. Victims supported by Praxis included Sylvester Marshall whose story gained widespread news coverage when he was refused NHS treatment and experienced homelessness as a result of the scandal.

"Two months after my first interview with The Guardian I went with Praxis to the Home Office to get my No Time Limit card – with that I was sure I could get my treatment. The day I started my treatment David Lammy invited me to speak at the Houses of Parliament. [...] I have heard that since the publicity around my case, thousands of people have sorted their papers too." - Sylvester Marshall.

Praxis provided evidence and testimony from its casework to British MPs, Caribbean High Commissioners, and an All party parliamentary group on Race and Community. The resulting task force and compensation scheme that was launched by the Home Office was criticised for its shortcomings by Praxis.

== Awards and recognition ==
- Shortlisted for a 2018 Third Sector Charity Partnership award for its work on the Windrush Scandal alongside the Joint Council for the Welfare of Immigrants, The Runnymede Trust, The Refugee and Migrant Centre and iMix.
- Highly commended in the 2018 PR Week Award in the Best Cause-Led Campaign category for work on the Windrush Scandal.
- Beneficiary of The Guardian's 2018 annual Charity Appeal.
- Winner of the 2019 Homeless Link National Award for Innovation.
- Finalist of the 2019 World Habitat Awards for housing migrant women and families.
