= French-American Foundation =

Non-profit organization

The French-American Foundation is a privately funded, non-governmental organization established to promote bilateral relations between France and the United States on topics of importance to the two countries, with a focus on contact between upcoming leaders from each country. It employs a variety of initiatives that include multi-year policy programs, conferences on issues of French-American interest, and leadership and professional exchanges of decision-makers from France and the United States.

Founded in 1976, the Foundation is an operating organization that relies on outside financial support to carry out its mission and does not provide grants. It is an independent, non-partisan, nonprofit organization.

== History ==
The idea was born in 1973 between Ambassador James G. Lowenstein, James Chace, editor-in-chief of Foreign Affairs, both members of the Council on Foreign Relations, an independent think tank, and Nicholas Wahl, a specialist of post-war France at Princeton University. In order to counter an anti-French sentiment within the State Department, the Senate Committee on Foreign Relations and the press, as well as anti-Americanism among the French elite, the three men grew the desire to create a structure dedicated to friendship between the US and its oldest ally, and outside government control, unlike the existing exchange programs led by the State Department since 1941.

== Young Leaders ==
The Young Leaders program is the flagship program of the French-American Foundation. The program was created in 1981, under the sponsorship of Princeton French-American economist Ezra Suleiman who remained its president until 2000. It was initially intended as a response to observations that the close working relationships between French and American leaders in the post-war period were waning as new, younger leaders rose with little exposure to their transatlantic counterparts. 38 years later, it still plays a key role in the creation of transatlantic bonds, with more than 500 leaders in government, business, media, military, culture and the non-profit sector having taken part.

Every year, juries in France and the United States select a small group (around twenty) of French and Americans between 30 and 40, that are destined to hold a leadership position in their field and to play an important role in a globalized world. The selected Young Leaders then participate in two five-day seminars, alternatively in the U.S. and France, with the opportunity to discuss issues of common concern and, more importantly, get to know each other and create durable bonds.

=== Notable alumni ===
Young Leaders alumni include prominent Americans such as:

- Former President Bill Clinton
- Former presidential candidate Hillary Clinton
- Executive Dina Powell
- Los Angeles Mayor Eric Garcetti
- Senator Evan Bayh
- Senator Bill Bradley
- Entrepreneur Auren Hoffman
- General Wesley Clark
- Former White House Chief of Staff Joshua Bolten
- Former World Bank president Robert Zoellick
- Filmmaker Charles Ferguson
- Frank Herringer, Transamerica Corporation
- John Thain, CIT Group
- Journalist Gwen Ifill
- Artist Kabir Sehgal
- Former Massachusetts Attorney General James Shannon
- Former DHS Assistant Secretary Jeohn Favors

French honorees include:

- President Emmanuel Macron
- Former Prime Minister Édouard Philippe
- Former President François Hollande
- Astronaut Thomas Pesquet
- Pierre Moscovici
- Arnaud Montebourg
- Najat Vallaud-Belkacem
- Fleur Pellerin
- Former Prime Minister Alain Juppé
- Henri de Castries, AXA
- Alexandre de Juniac, Air France-KLM
- Michel Combes, Alcatel-Lucent
- Frédéric Lemoine, Wendel
- Anne Lauvergeon, former chairperson & CEO of AREVA
- Michel Bon, former CEO of France Télécom

== Annual Gala ==
The Annual Gala is the principal fundraising event of the French-American Foundation. Each year at the Gala, the Foundation presents its Benjamin Franklin Award to two individuals who have made significant contributions to the French-American relationship. The Comte de Vergennes Award is presented to longtime supporters of the French-American Foundation.

Past honorees include: Anne Lauvergeon, Patricia Russo, Ambassador Anne Cox Chambers, Henri de Castries, John A. Thain, Hon. C. Douglas Dillon, Hon. Walter J. P. Curley, Médecins Sans Frontières, Bernard Arnault, Michel David-Weill, the Forbes family, Maurice Lévy, and Frederick W. Smith.

== The Translation Prize ==
The FAF awards annually the French-American Foundation and Florence Gould Foundation Translation Prize. The prize has been awarded since 1986. Since 2003, there have been two awards, one fiction, and one nonfiction. The prizes are not limited to contemporary works; Lydia Davis won in 2004 for her translation of Marcel Proust's Swann's Way. Arthur Goldhammer won in 2005 for his translation of Alexis de Tocqueville's Democracy in America.

== See also ==
- France–United States relations
