= David Gentleman =

British artist

David Gentleman RDI
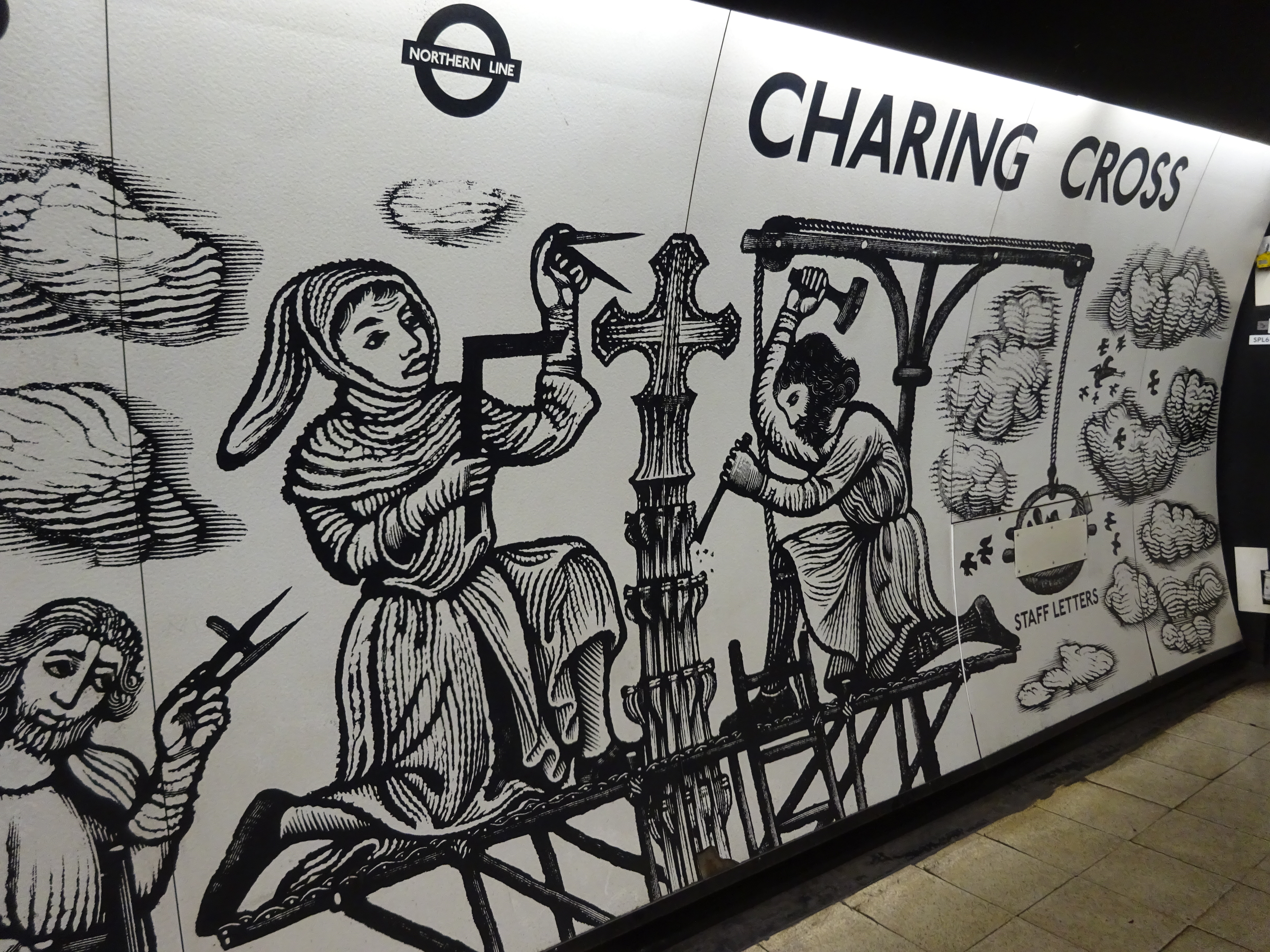
- Mural at Charing Cross Underground Station
- Born: David William Gentleman; 11 March 1930 (age 96); Brentford, London, England
- Education: Royal College of Art
- Occupations: Artist and designer
- Known for: Illustrations
- Spouses: Rosalind Dease; Susan Evans
- Children: 4, including Amelia
- Parents: Tom Gentleman (father); Winifred Gentleman (mother)

David William Gentleman RDI (born 11 March 1930) is an English artist. He studied art and painting at the Royal College of Art under Edward Bawden and John Nash. He has worked in watercolour, lithography and wood engraving, at scales ranging from platform-length murals for Charing Cross Underground Station in London to postage stamps and logos.

His themes include paintings of landscape and environmental posters to drawings of street life and protest placards. He has written and illustrated many books, mostly about countries and cities. He also designed a number of British commemorative postage stamps.

== Biography ==
Gentleman was born in Brentford, West London and grew up in Hertford, the son of Scottish artists Tom Gentleman and Winifred Gentleman who had met at the Glasgow School of Art. He attended Hertford Grammar School and the St Albans School of Art, did national service as an education sergeant in the Royal Army Educational Corps in charge of an art room in Cornwall, and then went to the Royal College of Art. He stayed there as a junior tutor for two years before becoming a freelance artist.

He has lived and worked on Gloucester Crescent in Camden Town since 1956, and also in Huntingfield, Suffolk, travelling only for work. He has four children: a daughter by his first wife Rosalind Dease, a fellow-student at the RCA, and two daughters and a son by his second wife Susan Evans, the daughter of the writer George Ewart Evans. His and Susan's daughter Amelia, a Guardian journalist, is married to Jo Johnson, brother of former British Prime Minister Boris Johnson.

His work is represented in Tate Britain, the British Museum, the Victoria and Albert Museum the Imperial War Museum, the Postal Museum, London and the Fitzwilliam Museum.

== Works ==
=== Watercolours and drawings ===
Gentleman paints and draws landscapes, buildings and people, and uses drawing in his design work. Many of his watercolours have been made in London and Suffolk and around Britain, on extended travels in France, Italy and India, and during briefer spells in South Carolina, East Africa, the Pacific and Brazil. He has held many exhibitions of these works. Commissioned series of watercolours have included landscapes for Shell, several Oxford Almanacks for the Oxford University Press, and interiors of the Foreign and Commonwealth Office for the FCO.

His drawings and watercolours have been reproduced on textiles and wallpapers, dinner plates for Wedgwood and on a Covent Garden mug for David Mellor. His architectural drawings have appeared in House & Garden, The Sunday Times, New York Magazine, and on the RIBA's series of Everyday Architecture wallcharts. His most recently published watercolours were made as illustrations for My Town: An Artist’s Life in London, 2020.

=== Wood engravings and a mural on the Underground ===
Detail of Gentleman's mural at Charing Cross tube station

Gentleman's early wood engravings were for Penguin paperbacks, greetings cards, wine lists, press ads, and books – Swiss Family Robinson and John Clare's The Shepherd's Calendar. He engraved a series of 32 covers for the New Penguin Shakespeare series. His wood engravings appear on many of his stamps, and in a 100-metre-long mural, his most widely seen public work.

In 1978, London Transport commissioned the platform-length Eleanor Cross murals on the underground at Charing Cross station. It shows, as in a strip cartoon, how the medieval workforce built the original cross, from quarrying the stone to setting in place the topmost pinnacle. Its wood-engraved images of stonemasons and sculptors, enlarged twenty times to life-size, mirror today's passengers going about their day's work.

=== Books ===
Between 1982 and 1997, Gentleman wrote and illustrated six travel books: David Gentleman’s Britain, London, Coastline, Paris, India and Italy, and more recently London You’re Beautiful, 2012, In the Country, 2014 and My Town: An Artist’s Life in London, 2020. He also wrote and illustrated four books about a small child on holiday: Fenella in Ireland, Greece, Spain and the South of France. His latest book is lessons for young artists, 2025.

=== Illustration ===
Gentleman has illustrated many books by other people, including drawings for the cookbook Plats du Jour. In 2009 he painted watercolours to illustrate Ask the Fellows Who Cut the Hay by George Ewart Evans. For the Limited Editions Club of New York City he illustrated The Swiss Family Robinson, Keats's Poems, The Jungle Book, and The Ballad of Robin Hood, and several books for children, including Russell Hoban's The Dancing Tigers. For the Folio Society, he produced illustrations for the Selected Poems of Edward Thomas. He has designed many paperback covers and jackets: for Penguin Books, E. M. Forster's novels and the New Penguin Shakespeare wood engravings; for Faber, many watercolours for Siegfried Sassoon and Lawrence Durrell novels; and for Duckworth, wood engraved or typographical designs for scientific and classical works.

=== Stamps, coins, and logos ===
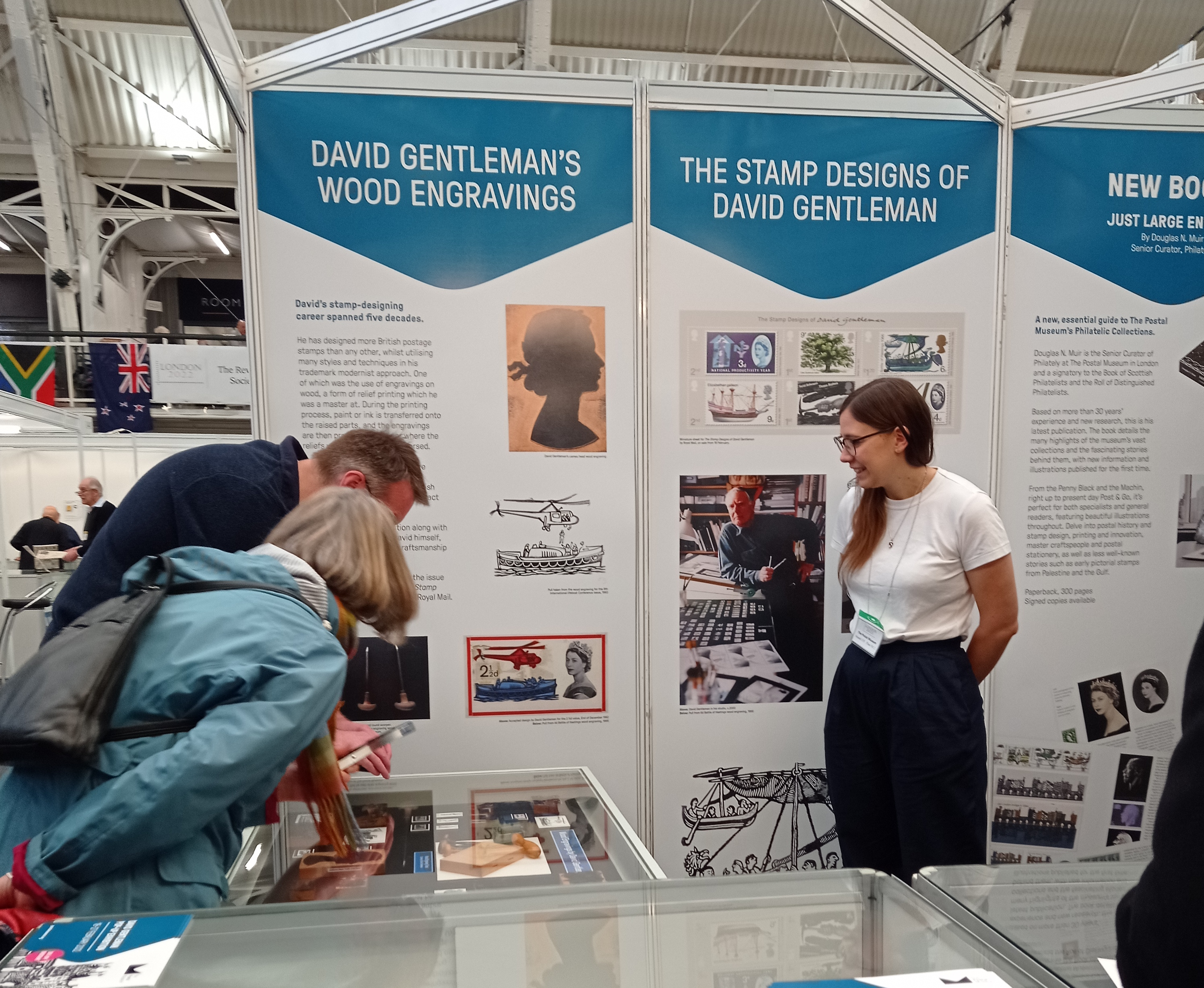
Inspecting a collection of David Gentleman woodblock designs at The Postal Museum stand at London 2022 International Stamp Exhibition

Between 1962 and 2000, Gentleman designed 103 stamps for the Post Office, making him the most prolific stamp designer in Britain at that time. These include sets commemorating Shakespeare, Churchill, Darwin, British Ships, Concorde, the Battle of Britain, the Battle of Hastings, the BBC, Good King Wenceslas, The Twelve Days of Christmas, Social Reformers, Ely Cathedral, Abbotsbury Swannery and the Millennium.

His stamp designs included an album of experimental designs commissioned by Tony Benn, the then Postmaster General, to show how stamps could dispense with the large photograph of the Queen then mandatory, or alternatively replace it with a smaller profile silhouette derived initially from Mary Gillick's coinage head. More than 40 years later, the wider range of subjects, the profile and the simpler designs that it made possible remained a feature of all British special stamps.

He won the Phillips Gold Medal for postage stamp design in both 1969 and 1979.

In 2022, the Royal Mail issued a set of six stamps commemorating Gentleman's designs.

The Royal Mint have issued two of Gentleman's coin designs. The first (issued jointly with the Monnaie de Paris in 2004) celebrated the centenary of the Entente Cordiale, and the second in 2007 commemorated the bicentenary of the Act for the abolition of the slave trade. Other miniature design commissions have included symbols or logos for the Bodleian Library, British Steel and a redesign of the National Trust's familiar symbol of a spray of oak leaves.

=== Posters ===
Gentleman has designed posters for public institutions including London Transport (Visitors' London and Victorian London), the Imperial War Museum, and the Public Record Office. A series in the seventies for the National Trust, used unconventional designs, photographs and photo-montages; some won design awards. Later, poster-like designs replaced words in his book A Special Relationship (Faber, 1979) on the US/UK alliance. Gentleman regretted that these images were not displayed as actual posters.

On the eve of the Iraq war in 2003, Gentleman offered the Stop the War Coalition a poster saying simply 'No', which was carried on the protest march. Other march placards followed, including 'No more lies' and 'Bliar'. His largest design was an installation in 2007 of 100,000 drops of blood, one for each person already killed in that war. The bloodstains were printed on 1,000 sheets of card pegged out in a vast square covering the grass in Parliament Square.

=== Lithographs and screenprints ===
Gentleman's first lithographs were posters for a Royal College of Art theatre group production of Orphée and a student exhibition, and one of his first commissions was for a large Lyons lithograph. Between 1970 and 2008 he made suites of lithographs of buildings (Covent Garden, South Carolina, Bath) and landscapes (of Gordale Scar, of the Seven Sisters, and of Suffolk subjects). These lithographs were printed in colour and were essentially representational. In 1970 he made six more poster-like screenprints, Fortifications, published in New York City. A number of these are in the collections of Tate Britain.

== Bibliography ==
=== Surveys of Gentleman's work ===
- David Gentleman, 'Bridges on the Backs', in Parenthesis; 14 (2008 February), p. 7–9
- The wood engravings of David Gentleman. Montgomery: Esslemont, 2000) ISBN 0-907014-17-8
- David Gentleman – Design. Brian Webb and Peyton Skipwith. (Antique Collectors' Club, 2009) ISBN 978-1-85149-595-5
- Peter Tucker, 'David Gentleman as book illustrator', in The Private Library; 4th series, 1:2 (1988 Summer), p. 50–100
- Mel Calman, 'The Gentleman touch', in Penrose Annual; 69 (1976), p. 157–168

=== Books by Gentleman ===
- Bridges on the Backs. Cambridge: Cambridge University Press, 1961.
- Design in Miniature. London: Studio Vista, 1972. ISBN 0-289-79791-8 New York: Watson-Gupthill, 1972. ISBN 0-8230-1322-7
- A Cross for Queen Eleanor: The Story of the Building of the Mediaeval Charing Cross, the Subject of the Decorations of the Northern Line Platforms of the New Charing Cross Underground Station. London: London Transport, 1979. ISBN 0-85329-101-2
- David Gentleman's Britain. New York: Dodd, Mead, 1982. ISBN 0-396-08145-2 London: Weidenfeld & Nicolson, 1982. ISBN 0-297-78126-X, 1985. ISBN 0-297-78621-0
- David Gentleman's London. London: Weidenfeld & Nicolson, 1985. ISBN 0-297-78574-5 Dodd, Mead, 1985. ISBN 0-396-08652-7 London: Orion, 1999. ISBN 0-7538-0700-9
- Westminster Abbey. (With Edward Carpenter.) London: Weidenfeld & Nicolson, 1987. ISBN 0-297-79314-4
- A Special Relationship. London: Faber and Faber, 1987. ISBN 0-571-14992-8
- David Gentleman's Coastline. London: Weidenfeld & Nicolson, 1988. ISBN 0-297-79314-4
- David Gentleman's Paris. London: Hodder & Stoughton, 1991. ISBN 0-340-58160-3 ISBN 0-340-51869-3 Paris: Gallimard,1991. ISBN 2-07-056619-6 London: Weidenfeld & Nicolson, 2000. ISBN 1-84188-052-3
- David Gentleman's India. London: Hodder & Stoughton, 1994. Delhi: Tara Press, 2005. ISBN 81-87943-71-8
- David Gentleman's Italy. London: Hodder & Stoughton, 1997 ISBN 0-340-64912-7, 1998 ISBN 0-340-64913-5
- Artwork. London: Ebury, 2002. ISBN 0-09-188652-X
- Ask the Fellows Who Cut the Hay. Framlingham, Full Circle Editions, 2010 ISBN 978-0-9561869-2-8
- London, You're Beautiful: An Artist's Year. Penguin, 2012 ISBN 978-1-846-14473-8
- In the Country. Framlingham, Full Circle Editions, 2014 ISBN 978-0-9571528-5-4
- My Town: An Artist’s Life in London. Particular Books, 2020 ISBN 978-1846149757
- Lessons for Young Artists. Penguin, 2025 ISBN 978-0-241-69281-3

=== Books for children by Gentleman ===
- Fenella in Greece. London: Cape, 1967.
- Fenella in Ireland. London: Cape, 1967.
- Fenella in the south of France. London: Cape, 1967.
- Fenella in Spain. London: Cape, 1967.

=== Books illustrated by Gentleman ===
- Betjeman, John. Illustrated poems of John Betjeman. John Murray, 1994. ISBN 0-7195-5248-6, 1997. ISBN 0-7195-5532-9
- Blunden, Edmund. The midnight skaters. Ed. C. Day-Lewis. London: Bodley Head, 1968.
- Brooke, Justin, and Edith Brooke. Suffolk Prospect. London: Faber & Faber, 1963.
- Brown, John Russell. Shakespeare and his theatre. New York: Lothrop, Lee & Shepard, 1982. ISBN 0-688-00850-X Harmondsworth: Kestrel, 1982.
- Brown, John Russell. Shakespeare's theatre. New York: Harper Collins, 1982.
- Clare, John. The shepherd's calendar. Oxford: Oxford University Press, 1964.
- Evans, George Ewart. Ask the fellows who cut the hay. Full Circle Editions, Framlingham, 2010. ISBN 978-0-9561869-2-8
- Evans, George Ewart. The crooked scythe: Anthology of oral history. London: Faber & Faber, 1993. 1995. ISBN 0-571-17194-X
- Evans, George Ewart. The pattern under the plough: Aspects of the folk-life of East Anglia. London: Faber & Faber, 1971. ISBN 0-571-08977-1
- Evans, George Ewart. The strength of the hills: An autobiography. New York: Farrar Straus & Giroux, 1985. ISBN 0-571-13550-1
- Evans, George Ewart. Where beards wag all: The relevance of the oral tradition. London: Faber & Faber, 1970. ISBN 0-571-08411-7
- "Francine" (Cosette Vogel de Brunhoff). "Vogue" French cookery. London: Peerage, 1984. ISBN 0-907408-86-9
- Gray, Patience, and Primrose Boyd. Plats du jour; or, foreign food. Harmondsworth, Middx: Penguin, 1957. London: Prospect, 1990. ISBN 0-907325-45-9 London: Persephone, 2007. ISBN 978-1-903155-60-8
- Grigson, Geoffrey. The Shell book of roads. London: Ebury, 1964.
- Haggard, F. Rider. King Solomon's mines. Barre, Mass.: Imprint Society, 1970.
- Hoban, Russell. The dancing tigers. London: Jonathan Cape, 1977, 1979. London: Red Fox, 1991.
- Hooker, Jeremy, ed. Inwards where all the battle is: A selection of Alun Lewis's writings from India. Newtown, Powys: Gwasg Gregynog, 1997. ISBN 0-948714-77-8 ISBN 0-948714-73-5
- Hornby, John. Gypsies. London: Oliver & Boyd, 1965.
- Jonson, Ben. The key keeper: A masque for the opening of Britain's Burse, 19 April 1609. Tunbridge Wells: Foundling Press, 2002.
- Kipling, Rudyard. The jungle book. New York: Limited Editions Club, 1968.
- Kipling, Rudyard. The jungle books. Easton Press: The 100 Greatest Books Ever written, 1985.
- Langstaff, John M. The 'Golden Vanity'. New York: Harcourt Brace, Jovanovich 1972. ISBN 0-15-231500-4 Tadworth: World's Work, 1973. ISBN 0-437-54106-1
- Langstaff, John M. St George and the dragon. New York: Atheneum, 1973.
- Lees, Jim. The ballads of Robin Hood. Cambridge: Limited Editions Club, 1977.
- Moreau, Reginald E. The departed village: Berrick Salome at the turn of the century. Oxford University Press, 1968. ISBN 0-19-211186-8
- Morpurgo, Michael. Our Jacko. Walker Books, 2018. ISBN 978-1-4063-6613-6
- Notestein, Lucy Lilian. Hill towns of Italy. London: Hutchinson, 1963. Boston: Little, Brown, 1963.
- Pudney, John. Bristol fashion: Some account of the earlier days of Bristol Aviation. London: Putnam, 1960.
- Simon, André L. What about wine? All the answers. London: Newman Neame, 1953.
- Stallworthy, Jon. A familiar tree. New York: Oxford University Press, 1978. ISBN 0-19-520050-0
- Steel, Flora Annie, ed. Tales of the Punjab, told by the people. London: Bodley Head, 1973.
- Stockton, Frank. The griffin and the minor canon. (With Charles Dickens, "The magic fishbone.") London: Bodley Head, 1960.
- Vallans, William. A tale of two swannes. London: The Lion and Unicorn Press, 1953.
- Ward, Aileen, ed. The poems of John Keats. New York: Limited Editions Club, 1966.
- Woodgate, Leslie. The Penguin part song book. Harmondsworth, Middx: Penguin, 1955.
- Wordsworth, William. The solitary song: Poems for young readers. London: Bodley Head, 1970. ISBN 0-370-01118-X
- Wyss, Johann. Swiss Family Robinson. New York: Limited Editions Club, 1963.

== Exhibitions ==
=== Solo exhibitions of watercolours by Gentleman ===
- India, Mercury Gallery, London, 1970.
- South Carolina, Mercury Gallery, London 1973.
- Kenya and Zanzibar, Mercury Gallery, London, 1976.
- Nauru and Samoa, Mercury Gallery, London, 1981.
- Britain, Mercury Gallery, London, 1982.
- London, Mercury Gallery, London, 1985.
- The British Coastline, Mercury Gallery, London, 1988.
- Paris, Mercury Gallery, London, 1991.
- India, Mercury Gallery, London, 1994.
- Italy, Mercury Gallery, London, 1987.
- City of London, Mercury Gallery, London, 2000.
- David Gentleman: from Andalusia to Zanzibar, Fine Art Society, 2004.
- Recent work, Fine Art Society, 2007.
- David Gentleman at eighty, Fine Art Society, 2010.
- Gentleman, David (2012). London, you're beautiful : an artist's year. London: Particular. ISBN 978-1-84614-473-8. OCLC 774640062.
- David Gentleman: London, You're Beautiful, Fine Art Society, 2012.
- David Gentleman: In the Country, Fine Art Society, 2014.
- David Gentleman: My Town: An Artist’s Life in London, Patrick Bourne & Co, 2020.

=== Retrospective exhibition ===
- Gentleman on Stamps, The British Postal Museum & Archive, London, 2009–2010.
- "The Kite Needs the String: the book illustration of David Gentleman", Manchester Metropolitan University Special Collections, 2010–2011.
