= Edmund Fawcett =

British political journalist

- Occupation: Writer
- Notable work: Liberalism: The Life of an Idea Conservatism: The Fight for a Tradition
- Parents: James Fawcett; Frances Lowe
- Relatives: Elias Avery Lowe (grandfather); Helen Tracy Lowe-Porter (grandmother); Charlotte Johnson Wahl (sister); Boris Johnson (nephew); Jo Johnson (nephew); Rachel Johnson (niece)

Edmund Fawcett is a British political journalist and author.

== Family ==
Fawcett is the son of the human rights lawyer and international law professor James Fawcett, brother of the artist Charlotte Johnson Wahl, and maternal uncle of Prime Minister Boris Johnson, journalist Rachel Johnson, and politician Jo Johnson.

He is married to Natalia Jiménez, granddaughter of Alberto Jiménez Fraud, the Spanish liberal and founding director of the Residencia de Estudiantes in Madrid, who left Spain as a political refugee in 1936.

== Career ==
He worked in London as an editor at New Left Books (now Verso) and in San Francisco as a freelance editor for Straightarrow Press, the books arm of Rolling Stone.

He then worked at The Economist (1973–2003) as chief correspondent in Washington, Paris, Berlin and Brussels, as well as European and literary editor. In a long career covering international politics, he wrote about the growth of the European Union, democratisation in Spain, Portugal and Greece, the end of the Cold War, new hopes for the United Nations, German reunification and the wars in ex-Yugoslavia. In the United States, he travelled widely, followed three presidential campaigns and wrote about the decline of detente in the late 1970s together with the rise of Reaganism. His frequent book reviews have appeared in The New York Times, Guardian and New Statesman, Times Literary Supplement and Political Quarterly.

Fawcett's book, The American Condition, written with a fellow journalist, Tony Thomas, came out in 1981. It was published in Britain as America, Americans. Fawcett also writes for Aeon, openDemocracy, Salon, and other websites.

His book Liberalism: The Life of an Idea was published in 2014, with an updated, expanded second edition in 2018. Fawcett argues that liberalism is a "modern practice of politics" with a specific history, rather than a fixed and unchanging philosophy. He has described himself as a 'left-liberal or liberal leftist'. A companion volume, Conservatism: The Fight for a Tradition was published in 2020, also by Princeton University Press. It offers a fresh and sharp-eyed history of political conservatism from its nineteenth-century origins as opponent of liberalism and democracy to today's hard Right.

The historian Peter Clarke in the Financial Times called Liberalism (2nd edition) "a liberal history, well-founded in its scholarship and also accessibly expounded". The Guardian praised Liberalism as a "remarkable book", and "a helpful characterisation of liberalism". The Wall Street Journal called the book a "fine work of intellectual history". Jack MacLeod, writing in the journal Victorian Studies, said the book "makes a major contribution to our understanding of a concept that, for two centuries, has been central to Western political and cultural thought".
