= The Secret of the Forest =

1956 British chiledren's film by Darcy Conyers

- Film titles
- Directed by: Darcy Conyers
- Written by: Darcy Conyers; George Ewart Evans; Gerard Bryant
- Produced by: Anthony Gilkison
- Starring: Kit Terrington; Jacqueline Cox
- Cinematography: Sydney Samuelson
- Edited by: John Reeve
- Music by: DeWolfe
- Production company: Rayant Pictures
- Distributed by: British Lion Film Corporation; Children's Film Foundation
- Release date: March 1956
- Running time: 61 minutes
- Country: United Kingdom
- Language: English

The Secret of the Forest (also known as Ship in the Forest) in a 1956 children's film directed by Darcy Conyers and starring Kit Terrington and Jacqueline Cox. It was produced by Rayant Pictures for the Children's Film Foundation. The storyline was developed by George Ewart Evans following a formula already developed by the CFF.

== Plot ==
Spoilt children Henry and Caroline are excavating an ancient burial site when two crooks, having stolen a gold cup and hidden it in the site, return to retrieve it. Johnny and Mary, children of the local chief forester, see the trouble from a forest fire-watch tower and send for help.

== Cast ==
- Kit Terrington as Henry
- Jacqueline Cox as Caroline
- Barry Knight as Johnny
- Diana Day as Mary
- Michael Balfour as Len
- Arthur Lovegrove as Wally
- Vincent Ball as Mr Lawson
- John Drake as P.C. Oates
- Roy Purcell as Mr Carver
- Ewen Solon as Mr Roberts
- Pamela Abbott as Mrs Roberts
- Charles Saynor as Jack Hodges
- John Stirling as fire watcher
- Ned Hood as police motorcyclist
- Dan Cressy as police motorcyclist

== Production ==
The film was inspired by the late 1930s archaeological discovery of Sutton Hoo. The film was made on location in Suffolk including scenes in Ipswich Museum, Rendlesham Forest and on the Deben River.

== Reception ==
The Monthly Film Bulletin wrote: "An adequate children's film which makes occasional breaks with the traditional pattern. The plot is contrived and becomes somewhat confused through the introduction of incidents relatively unimportant to the main story-line – for instance, the overemphasis on the inconsiderate nature of Henry and Caroline, already established as spoilt children. The chase sequence makes an exciting climax, compensating for some slow development in the early stages."
