= Charlotte Johnson Wahl =

British painter (1942–2021)

- Born: Charlotte Offlow Fawcett; 29 May 1942; Oxford, England
- Died: 13 September 2021 (aged 79); London, England
- Education: Lady Margaret Hall, Oxford
- Spouses: Stanley Johnson (m. 1963; div. 1979); Nicholas Wahl (m. 1988; died 1996)
- Children: Boris; Rachel; Leo; Jo
- Parents: Sir James Fawcett (father); Frances Lowe (mother)
- Relatives: Elias Avery Lowe (grandfather); Helen Tracy Lowe-Porter (grandmother); Edmund Fawcett (brother); Carrie Symonds (daughter-in-law); Amelia Gentleman (daughter-in-law)
- Website: charlottejohnsonwahl.com

Charlotte Johnson Wahl (née Fawcett; 29 May 1942 – 13 September 2021) was a British artist. She was the mother of Boris Johnson, the former prime minister of the United Kingdom, as well as the journalist Rachel Johnson and the politician Jo Johnson.

== Early life and education ==
Johnson Wahl was born Charlotte Maria Offlow Fawcett in Oxford on 29 May 1942. Her father was the English barrister Sir James Fawcett and her mother was Frances Beatrice Fawcett (née Lowe). Frances was the daughter of Elias Avery Lowe, a Russian-American Jewish palaeographer, and Helen Tracy Lowe-Porter, an American translator and writer, along with Frances's four siblings (including the journalist and author Edmund Fawcett). James was the son of Joseph Fawcett, an English clergyman, and Edith Fawcett (née Scattergood).

In 1961 Johnson Wahl began studying English at Lady Margaret Hall, a college of Oxford University. She took her finals in 1965, the first year the college granted permission for married undergraduates to sit them. She obtained a second-class honours degree.

== Paintings ==
Johnson Wahl was a professional portrait painter for Crispin Tickell, Joanna Lumley, Jilly Cooper, Simon Jenkins, and others. She painted children with their toys and dogs. Additionally, she painted landscapes and still lifes. Jonathan Jones of The Guardian described her paintings as influenced by Vorticism.

Johnson Wahl held exhibitions: at the Maudsley Hospital, London, in 1974; in Brussels in 1970s; and at the Gavin Graham Gallery in London in 2004. A retrospective exhibition of her work was displayed at Mall Galleries, London, in 2015. The documentary Painting the Johnsons for Sky Arts follows her career.

In 1997 Johnson Wahl painted for a fellowship in Bogliasco, Italy. Her paintings sold for £1,000 to £5,000. Two of Wahl's paintings are in the collection of the Bethlem Museum of the Mind; another two are in the collections of Oxford University colleges.

== Personal life ==
She met Stanley Johnson at an All Souls lunch hosted by her father to celebrate Johnson's Newdigate Prize for poetry. They married in 1963 and lived in England, the United States, and Brussels. In 1974, Charlotte Johnson Wahl was treated in Belgium for phobias, obsessive–compulsive disorder, and anxiety around her children, which she said her husband was unsympathetic to. In 1979, the couple divorced. Their four children are Boris Johnson, Jo Johnson, Rachel Johnson, and Leo Johnson.

In 2020 Charlotte Johnson Wahl told the biographer Tom Bower that Stanley Johnson had hit her "many times, over many years". Charlotte Johnson Wahl said that the abuse originated from his jealousy when she saw her friends. She stated that Johnson broke her nose, which family friends of his corroborated. On one occasion, he abandoned her without a car.

In 1988 Johnson Wahl married Nicholas Wahl, an American academic who studied French politics. They had met at a dinner party of Tickell in Brussels. They lived together in Washington Square, New York. Wahl died of cancer in 1996.

Johnson Wahl was diagnosed with Parkinson's disease at the age of 40. On 13 September 2021 Johnson Wahl died at St Mary's Hospital in London, at the age of 79.

== Political views ==
In 2015 the Evening Standard referred to Johnson Wahl as "left-wing", with her daughter Rachel stating that her father Stanley "tends to marry socialists". Johnson Wahl said in 2015 that she never voted for the Conservative Party and supported Jeremy Corbyn's leadership of the Labour Party. Rachel commented that her mother was "the only red in the village when we lived on Exmoor". In October 2019, during Boris Johnson's speech to the Conservative Party conference, he said that his mother voted for the United Kingdom to leave the European Union in the 2016 referendum.
