= Helen Tracy Lowe-Porter =

American translator (1876–1963)

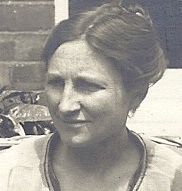
- Lowe-Porter in 1920
- Born: Helen Tracy Porter; June 15, 1876; Towanda, Pennsylvania, U.S.
- Died: April 26, 1963 (aged 86); Princeton, New Jersey, U.S.
- Education: Wells College, Class of 1898
- Known for: Translator of Thomas Mann
- Spouse: Elias Avery Lowe
- Children: 3
- Relatives: James Fawcett (son in-law); Charlotte Johnson Wahl (granddaughter); Edmund Fawcett (grandson); Boris, Rachel & Jo Johnson (great‑grandchildren)

Helen Tracy Lowe-Porter (née Porter; June 15, 1876 – April 26, 1963) was an American translator and writer, best known for translating almost all of the works of Thomas Mann for their first publication in English.

== Personal life ==
Helen Tracy Porter was the daughter of Clara (née Holcombe) and Henry Clinton Porter. She was the niece of Charlotte Endymion Porter, editor of Poet Lore, a poetry journal, and an expert on Shakespeare and Elizabeth and Robert Browning. She completed early schooling in native Towanda, Pennsylvania and attended Wells College in Aurora, New York, graduating in 1898 as a member of Phi Beta Kappa. She worked with her aunt to prepare works of English literature for republication. She married the paleographer Elias Avery Lowe in 1911. The couple lived in Oxford; after 1937, their residence was in Princeton, New Jersey. Their great-grandson is Boris Johnson, the former Prime Minister of the United Kingdom.

== Becoming Mann's translator ==
In 1916 New York publisher Alfred A. Knopf released Royal Highness, a translation of Thomas Mann's 1909 novel Königliche Hoheit by A. Cecil Curtis. While the book attracted little attention, Mann's German publisher Samuel Fischer took note of Knopf's seriousness and in 1921 granted him the English-language rights for Mann's work in the United States. Knopf in turn persuaded London publisher Martin Secker to take on publication of shared translations in the UK and its publishing territories.

Meanwhile, Lowe-Porter, who lived in England from 1914 to 1937 while her husband taught at Oxford, was trying to establish herself as a translator. She had already done some work for William Heinemann when in 1922 she obtained a German copy of Mann's novel Buddenbrooks, first published in 1901, and made a successful pitch to translate it. As an American in England she was well placed to build relationships with both Knopf and Secker, and indeed with Mann, whom she met at Oxford in 1924.

Knopf and Secker were pleased with her work on Buddenbrooks and proposed her to translate The Magic Mountain, but Mann hesitated — partly, it seems, because he thought translating his magnum opus was a man's job. It was, however, for Knopf as primary rights-holder to choose the translator and, backed by Secker, he convinced Mann to stick with Lowe-Porter, whose translation was published in 1927. Its huge success in both the U.S. and the UK — which Mann believed helped unlock the Nobel Prize for him in 1929 — cemented Lowe-Porter as the German writer's sole authorized English tranlsator, a position she occupied until her retirement in the 1950s, shortly before Mann's own death in 1955.

For decades, Lowe-Porter's translations of Mann were usually the only versions that existed in the English-speaking world. Exceptions were A. Cecil Curtis's 1916 translation of Royal Highness mentioned above, which had no rival until Konrad Silberfalk's self-published translation appeared in 2026; and Kenneth Burke's translations of Death in Venice, Tristan and Tonio Kröger in 1924 — initially for The Dial, but then taken over by Knopf until Lowe-Porter's versions became available. Herman George Scheffauer, who for a time also aspired to be Mann's principal English translator, did the novella Herr und Hund in 1923 for Henry Holt (U.S.) and William Collins (UK) under the title of Bashan and I. When Scheffauer died in 1927 he left behind translations of nine short stories, which Knopf published in 1928 as Children and Fools, as well as reissuing Bashan and I under the title of A Man and His Dog in 1930. Martin Secker showed little interest in producing UK editions of these volumes, which were quickly superseded by Lowe-Porter's versions. Mann's late works The Black Swan (1953, English version 1954) and Felix Krull (1954, English version 1955) appeared after Lowe-Porter's retirement and were translated by others.

== Activity ==
In her essay "On Translating Thomas Mann", Lowe-Porter discussed translating Mann's novels, and expressed some thoughts on translating generally. She wrote, for example, that in translating the second volume of Mann's Joseph series, Young Joseph, she had "been forced—since the English version was for both markets [British and American]—to emasculate the style, in some degree, taking care to write only what would be acceptable literary usage on both sides of the ocean". She also said, in her note to her translation of Der Zauberberg (The Magic Mountain):

[T]he violet has to be cast into the crucible, the organic work of art to be remoulded in another tongue.... [S]ince in the creative act word and thought are indivisible, the task was seen to be one before which artists shrink and logical minds recoil.

She wrote an original play, Abdication, which received its first production in Dublin in September 1948. It was "a thinly-veiled portrait of Edward VIII's dethroning" and was published by Alfred A. Knopf.

== Thomas Mann translations ==
Lowe-Porter's translations of Thomas Mann works include the following (dates in brackets refer to the German publication, the dates after to the English-language translations).

- Buddenbrooks [1901] 1924
- The Magic Mountain [1924] 1927
- Death in Venice [1912] 1928 in the UK, 1930 in the U.S.
- Mario and the Magician [1930] 1930 in the UK, 1931 in the U.S.
- A Sketch of My Life [1930] 1930 — a limited edition of Lowe-Porter's translation was published in Paris in 1930; the first trade edition appeared in 1960
- Joseph and His Brothers, comprising:
  - I. The Tales of Jacob [1933] 1934
  - II. Young Joseph [1934] 1935
  - III. Joseph in Egypt [1936] 1938
  - IV. Joseph the Provider [1943] 1944
- Stories of Three Decades 1936
  A collection with no German equivalent assembling most of Mann's short fiction composed between 1897 and 1929; translations, some previously published, 1928–1936.
- The Beloved Returns [1939] 1940
- The Transposed Heads [1940] 1941
- The Tables of the Law [1944] 1945
- Essays of Three Decades 1947
- Doctor Faustus [1947] 1948
- The Holy Sinner [1951] 1951

== Critical reaction ==
Mann expressed his appreciation to Lowe-Porter for her work, nicknaming her "die Lowe", but also added the caveat, "insofar as my linguistic knowledge suffices". Critic Theodore Ziolkowski said of Lowe-Porter's translation of Mann's Buddenbrooks:

Lowe-Porter provided a valuable service by making Mann's novel initially accessible to the English and American publics.

Other commentaries on her translations have included the following:

The Lowe-Porter translations of Thomas Mann, despite occasional inaccuracies almost inevitable in works of such length and complexity, convey the ironic and pyrotechnical style of the original with great effectiveness.

Despite minor inaccuracies, misreadings, and possible errors of judgment (to which all translators are subject, whatever they may say), Lowe-Porter's translations are widely beloved and have become classics in their own right, to stand beside Constance Garnett's Tolstoy and Dostoyevsky and Scott Moncrieff's Proust. She is indisputably, in quantity as in quality, one of the great translators of our time.

Thomas Mann and Proust were lucky in their translators.

Though early reviewers were generally impressed by the relative readability of Lowe-Porter's English and by the sheer scale of the task, from the 1950s on doubts were expressed about the accuracy of the translations, culminating in Timothy Buck's study which led him to conclude that they constituted "grossly distorted and diminished versions" of Mann's work, and that "the loss, not only of accuracy but also of quality, is inestimable." Not only was her grasp of German so shaky that she made countless elementary errors of comprehension, but she also made frequent omissions and additions and unnecessarily simplified Mann's characteristic complex syntax. A review of John E. Woods' translation of Mann's Buddenbrooks states that, in her translation of the novel, Lowe-Porter "leveled Mann's colorful variety of speech into a uniformly even style, in certain cases simply omitting passages. As a result, much of the novel's humor was lost."

A new assessment of the English translations of Thomas Mann within the framework of modern descriptive-analytical translation studies has been provided by David Horton. Horton seeks to move beyond an exclusively error-based evaluation of literary translation, examines various salient dimensions of versions by Lowe-Porter, David Luke, and John E. Woods, and demonstrates that Lowe-Porter's approach to translation was in keeping with the practice prevalent at the time. A review of Horton's book concludes, "Not the least of Horton's accomplishments is to rehabilitate [Lowe-Porter's] reputation...."
