= Michel Bon =

French businessman and politician

- Born: 5 July 1943 (age 83); Grenoble, France
- Education: Lycée Champollion; Lycée du Parc; ESSEC Business School; Sciences Po; École nationale d'administration Stanford Graduate School of Business
- Occupation: Businessman

Michel Bon (born 5 July 1943) is a French businessman and politician. He is a graduate of the ESSEC Business School, of the Paris Institute of Political Studies, of the École nationale d'administration and of Stanford Business School.

In 1981, he was selected to be one of the first Young Leaders of the French-American Foundation.

He worked at the banks Crédit National and Crédit Agricole. He has been CEO then chairman of the supermarket group Carrefour. From 1993 to 1995 he was head of the French unemployment agency. He was chairman of France Télécom from 1995 to 2002.

He was formerly president of the Institut Pasteur. He is also an administrator at Lafarge and formerly of Air Liquide.
