= Tristan (novella) =

Novella by Thomas Mann

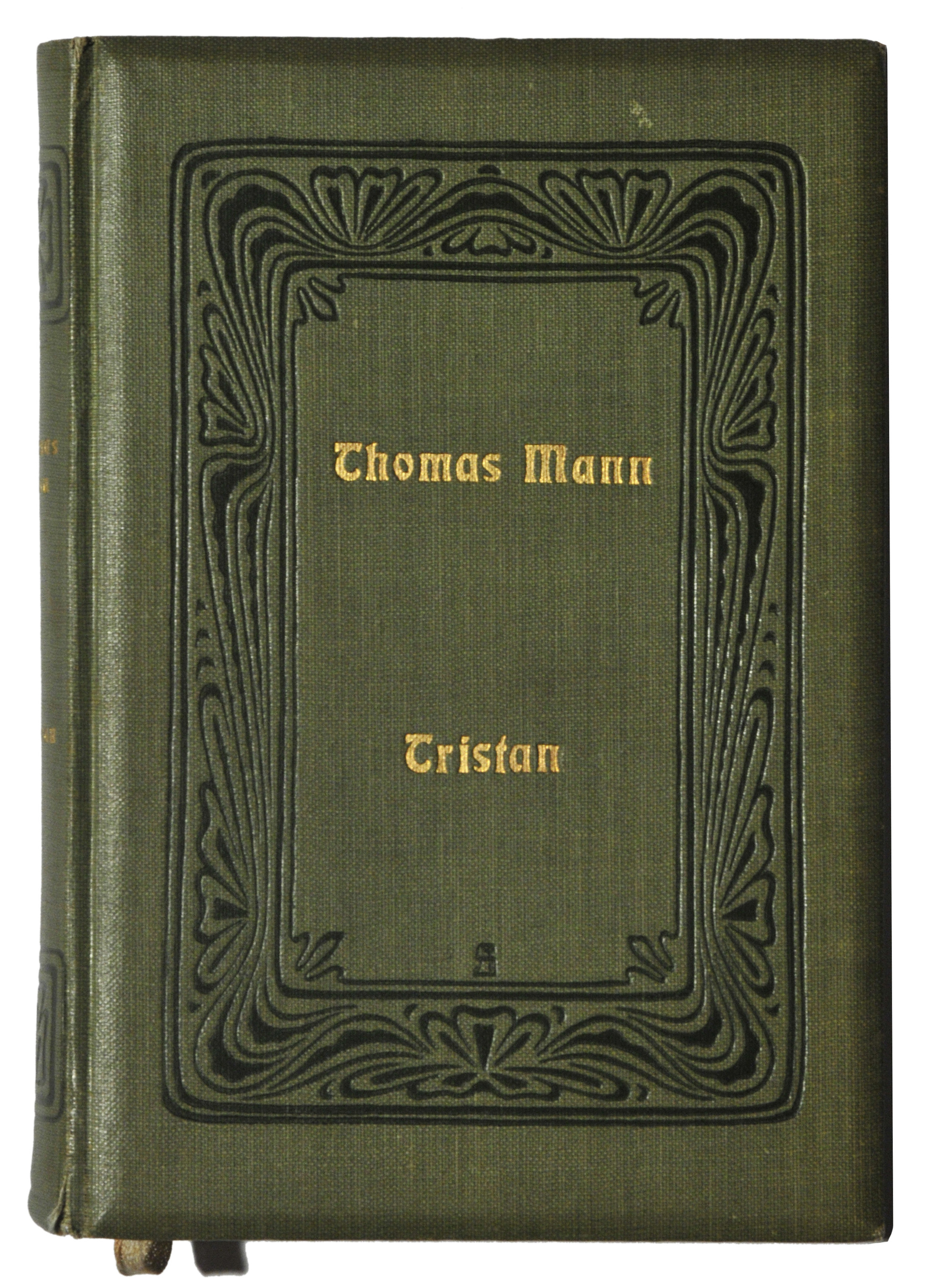
- First edition
- Author: Thomas Mann
- Original title: Tristan
- Language: German
- Publisher: Reclam
- Publication date: 1903
- Publication place: Germany
- OCLC: 4764708
- Text: Tristan at Internet Archive

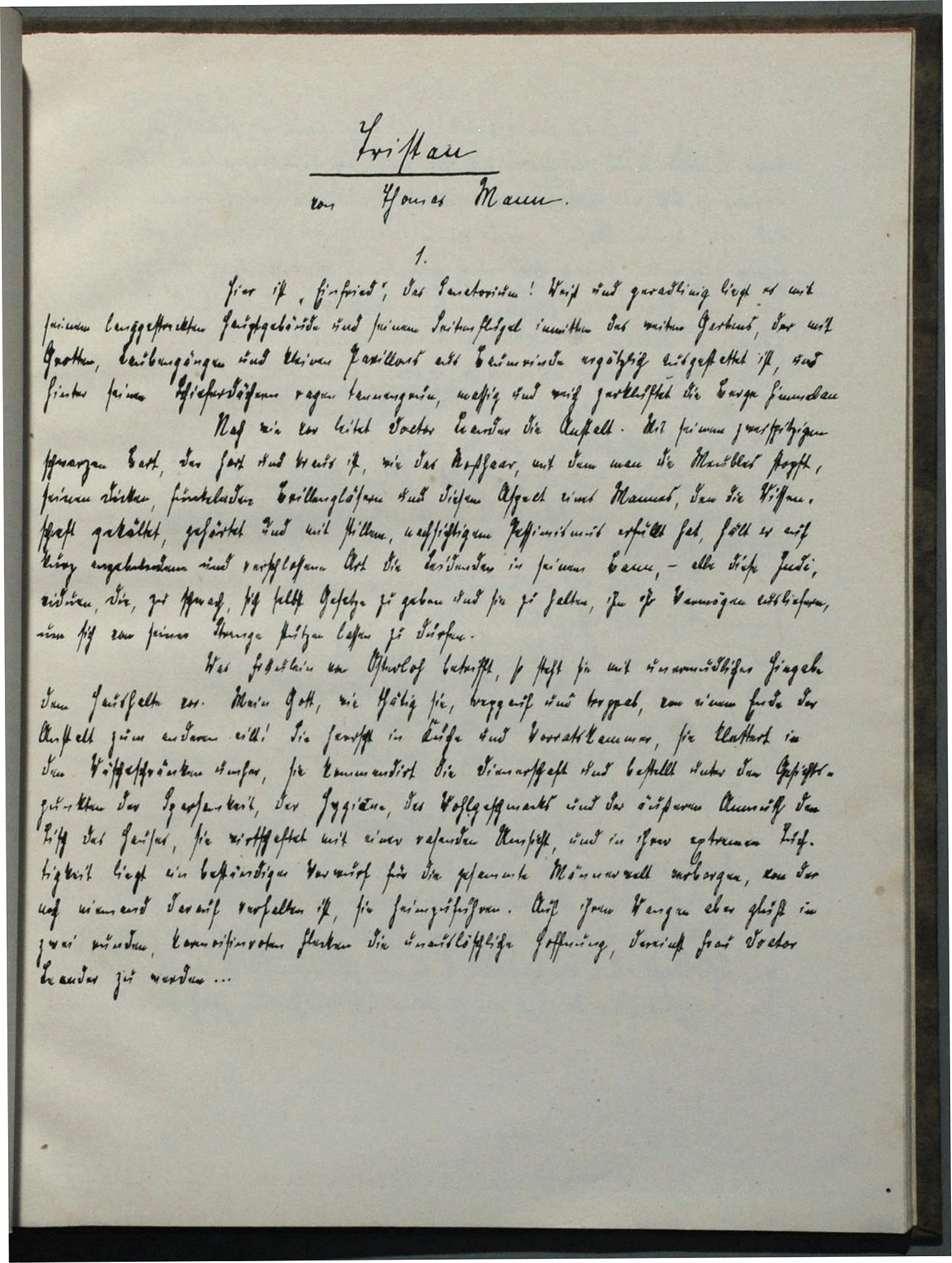
A facsimile of the manuscript

Tristan is a 1903 novella by German writer Thomas Mann set in a sanatorium. It contains many references to the myth of Tristan and Iseult. The novella alludes in particular to the version presented in Richard Wagner's opera of the same name.

== English translations ==
- Scofield Thayer and Kenneth Burke, The Dial (1922-23)
- Helen Tracy Lowe-Porter (1936)
- David Luke (1988)
- Joachim Neugroschel (1998)
- Jefferson S. Chase (1999)
