= James Fawcett =

Barrister and member of the European Commission for Human Rights

Sir James Fawcett DSC QC
- Born: James Edmund Sandford Fawcett; 16 April 1913; Wallingford, Berkshire, England
- Died: 24 June 1991 (aged 78); Oxford, England
- Education: New College, Oxford
- Occupation: Barrister
- Years active: 1945–1984
- Known for: Member (1962–1984) then President of the European Commission for Human Rights (1972–1981)
- Spouse: Frances Beatrice Lowe (m. 1937)
- Children: 5, including Edmund Fawcett and Charlotte Johnson Wahl
- Relatives: Boris Johnson (grandson); Rachel Johnson (granddaughter); Jo Johnson (grandson)
- Military career
- Allegiance: United Kingdom
- Branch: Royal Navy
- Service years: 1940–1945
- Rank: Lieutenant commander
- Conflicts: Second World War

Sir James Edmund Sandford Fawcett DSC QC (16 April 1913 – 24 June 1991) was a British barrister. He was a member of the European Commission for Human Rights from 1962 to 1984, and its president from 1972 to 1981, and was knighted in 1984. He is a grandfather of former British Prime Minister Boris Johnson.

== Childhood and education ==
Fawcett was born in Wallingford, which was then in Berkshire. He was the son of Joseph Fawcett, a clergyman in the Church of England from a family of old Yorkshire gentry (Fawcett of Sandford Hall), and Edith (née Scattergood).

He was educated at the Dragon School in Oxford and at Rugby School, and then read classics at New College, Oxford. He graduated with first-class honours. He won a prize fellowship at All Souls College, Oxford, and was again a fellow at All Souls from 1961 to 1969. He won the Eldon Law Scholarship and was called to the bar by the Inner Temple in 1938.

== Career ==
He worked practising as a barrister on the North-eastern Circuit.

After the outbreak of the Second World War, he was commissioned in the Royal Navy Volunteer Reserve in 1940, and served as the torpedo officer of a destroyer. He was awarded the Distinguished Service Cross in 1942 for sinking an Italian destroyer.

After the war, he joined the Foreign Office as a legal adviser. He was a member of the UK's delegation to the United Nations in New York from 1948 to 1950, and also worked in the British Embassy in Washington, D.C. He assisted with the writing of the Universal Declaration of Human Rights.

He returned to private practice as a barrister in 1950, at the chambers led by John Galway Foster at 2 Hare Court. He appeared for the UK at the International Court of Justice at The Hague several times.

He was general counsel to the International Monetary Fund from 1955 to 1960, and he was a member of the European Commission of Human Rights from 1962 to 1984, serving as its president from 1972 to 1982. He was also director of studies at the Royal Institute of International Affairs (also known as Chatham House) from 1969 to 1973, and professor of international law at King's College London from 1976 to 1980.

He published several books, including International Law and the Uses of Outer Space in 1968, The Law of Nations, an introduction to international law, in 1968, and The Application of the European Convention on Human Rights, an article by article commentary on the Convention, in 1969. He became a member of the Institut de Droit International in 1973. He was appointed Knight Bachelor in the 1984 Birthday Honours, and took silk to become a Queen's Counsel in 1985.

== Personal life ==
Fawcett married Frances Beatrice Lowe, the daughter of Elias Avery Lowe and Helen Tracy Lowe-Porter, in St Pancras in 1937. They had met many years before, while both pupils at the Dragon School. They had one son, the journalist and author Edmund Fawcett, and four daughters. One of their daughters was the artist Charlotte Johnson Wahl, mother of former British Prime Minister Boris Johnson, the journalist Rachel Johnson, former government minister and life peer Jo Johnson, and the entrepreneur Leo Johnson. He enjoyed astronomy and played the piano.

He died at Radcliffe Infirmary in Oxford after suffering a stroke, survived by his wife and five children.
