= Rachel Johnson =

British journalist

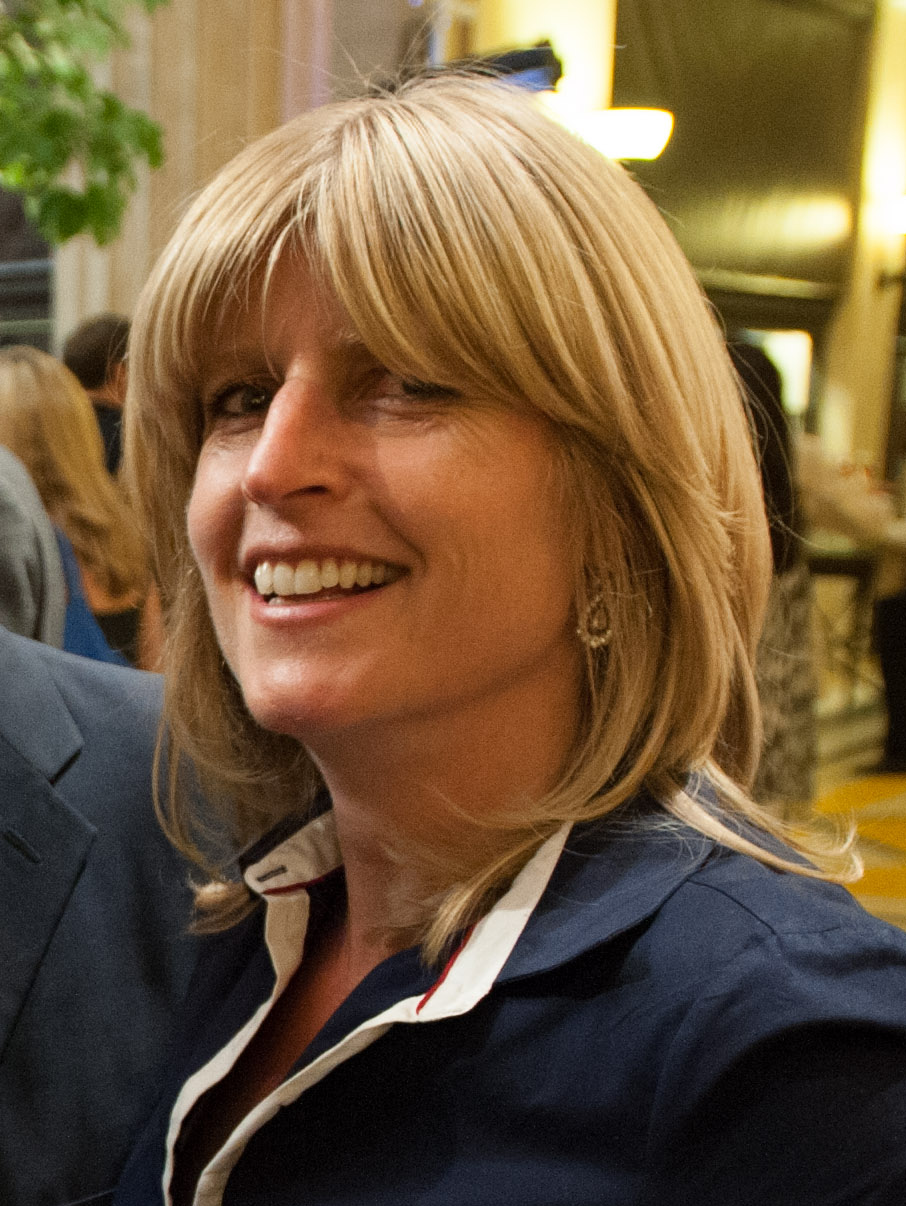
- Johnson in 2014
- Born: Rachel Sabiha Johnson; 3 September 1965 (age 60); London, England
- Education: European School of Brussels I; New College, Oxford
- Occupations: Author; presenter
- Political party: Conservative (2008-2011, 2026-)
- Other political affiliations: Independent (before 2008, 2019–2026); Change UK (2019); Liberal Democrats (2017–2019)
- Spouse: Ivo Dawnay (m. 1992)
- Children: 3
- Parents: Stanley Johnson (father); Charlotte Fawcett (mother)
- Relatives: Boris Johnson (brother); Jo Johnson (brother); Julia Johnson (half-sister); Carrie Symonds (sister-in-law); Amelia Gentleman (sister-in-law); James Fawcett (grandfather); Edmund Fawcett (uncle); Ali Kemal (great grandfather); Elias Avery Lowe (great grandfather); Helen Tracy Lowe-Porter (great grandmother)

Rachel Sabiha Johnson (born 3 September 1965) is a British journalist, television presenter, and author who has appeared frequently on political discussion panels, including The Pledge on Sky News and BBC One's debate programme, Question Time. In January 2018, she participated in the 21st series of Celebrity Big Brother and was evicted second. She was the lead candidate for Change UK for the South West England constituency in the 2019 European Parliament election.

== Early life and education ==
Johnson is the daughter of former Conservative MEP Stanley Johnson and artist Charlotte Johnson Wahl (née Fawcett). She is the younger sister of Boris Johnson, the former Prime Minister of the United Kingdom and Conservative MP for Uxbridge and South Ruislip; and the elder sister of Jo Johnson, former Conservative MP for Orpington.

On her father's side, Johnson is a great-granddaughter of Ali Kemal, a liberal Circassian-Turkish journalist and the interior minister in the government of Damat Ferid Pasha, Grand Vizier of the Ottoman Empire, who was murdered during the Turkish War of Independence in 1922. During the First World War, her grandfather and great-aunt were recognised as British subjects and took their grandmother's maiden name of Johnson. On her mother's side she is a granddaughter of Sir James Fawcett, a prominent barrister and president of the European Commission of Human Rights.

Johnson's middle name, Sabiha, means "morning" in Arabic and is often used as a given name in Turkey. It was the name of the second wife of her great-grandfather, Ali Kemal, who was a daughter of Zeki Pasha. Stanley Johnson befriended his paternal half-uncle Zeki Kuneralp, Sabiha's son, when Kuneralp was Turkish ambassador to the Court of St James's in the 1960s.

She was educated at Winsford First School on Exmoor, Primrose Hill Primary in Camden, north London, the European School of Brussels, the independent Ashdown House School in East Sussex, Bryanston School in Dorset and St Paul's Girls' School. In 1984 she spent three months as a kibbutz volunteer and then went to New College, Oxford, to read Classics (Literae Humaniores); there she edited the student paper Isis.

== Journalism career ==
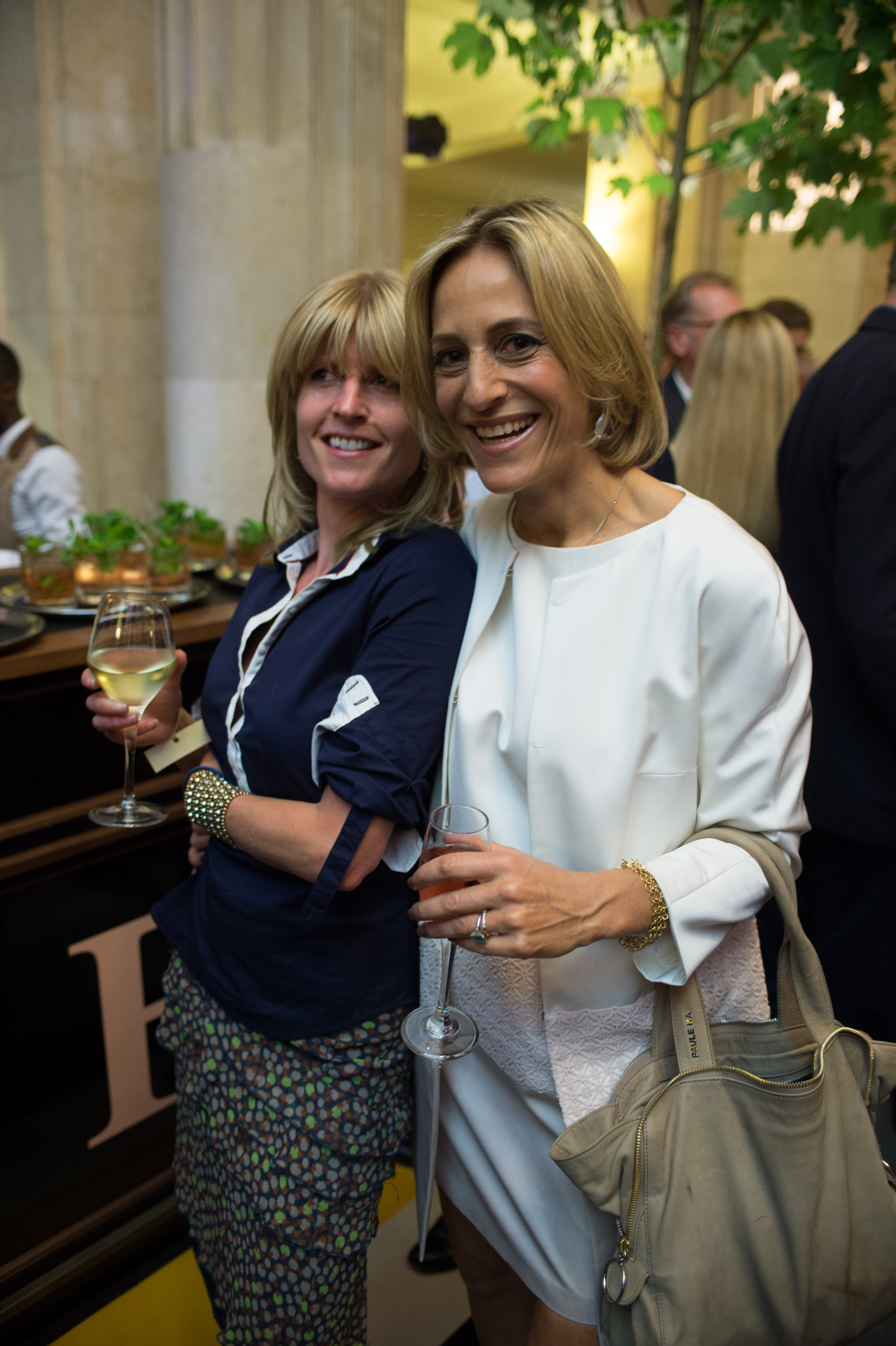
Johnson with Emily Maitlis in 2014

In 1989, she joined the staff of the Financial Times, becoming the first female graduate trainee at the paper, where she wrote about the economy. She spent a year on secondment to the Foreign Office Policy Planning Staff in 1992–93. She moved to the BBC in 1994, but left to move to Washington, D.C., as a columnist and freelancer in 1997.

She has written weekly columns for The Sunday Telegraph, The Daily Telegraph, the Evening Standard and other regular columns for Easy Living and She magazines, as well as the Financial Times. She is a contributing editor of The Spectator and until 2009 was a weekly columnist on The Sunday Times and the Evening Standard, among other publications. She now writes a weekly column in The Mail on Sunday, a column for The Big Issue and a column for The Oldie.

In April 2014, she was a judge in the BBC Woman's Hour power list 2014. She sits on the boards of Bright Blue, the modernising Tory think-tank, and Intelligence Squared, the international debate forum. In March 2014 she appeared in Famous, Rich and Hungry on BBC1. She is a former panellist on Sky News' weekly debate show, The Pledge, production of which was suspended in 2020.

=== The Lady ===
In September 2009, Johnson became the ninth editor of The Lady, a weekly magazine established in 1885. Her first few months were the subject of a Channel 4 documentary entitled The Lady and the Revamp; this was nominated for a Grierson Award. She was replaced as editor by Matt Warren in January 2012. In March 2013 she presented an hour-long documentary for BBC Four entitled How to Be a Lady: An Elegant History.

== Literary career ==
Johnson's Shire Hell won the 2008 Bad Sex in Fiction Prize, which she described as being an "absolute honour".

Her short story "Severely Gifted" appeared in The Sunday Times on 21 December 2008.

== Political career ==
Johnson was a member of the Conservative Party from 2008 to 2011, but later joined the Liberal Democrats in the run up to the 2017 general election because of the Conservative support for Brexit. Johnson then considered becoming a Lib Dem candidate in a seat in the West Country, but was barred under the party's rules, having been a member for less than a year.

In April 2019, she joined the new anti-Brexit party Change UK and was the lead candidate on the party list in South West England at the 2019 European Parliament election. She later lamented this decision, describing herself as the "rat that jumped onto a sinking ship" and criticised the party leadership's focus-group attitude to decision-making structure and added that Change UK was a "terrible" name.

== Personal life ==
Johnson is married to Ivo Dawnay, a descendant of William Dawnay, 7th Viscount Downe, and maternal grandson of Patrick Boyle, 8th Earl of Glasgow. Dawnay is a director and consultant with the National Trust. They have three children. Johnson lives in Notting Hill in London and Exmoor, Somerset.

== Bibliography ==
- The Oxford Myth (Weidenfeld and Nicolson, 1988)
- The Mummy Diaries (Penguin, 2004)
- Notting Hell (Penguin, 2006)
- Shire Hell (2008)
- In A Good Place (2009)
- A Diary of The Lady, My First Year as Editor (Penguin, 2010)
- A Diary of The Lady, My first Year and a Half (2011)
- Winter Games (2012)
- Fresh Hell (2015)
- Rake's Progress: My Political Midlife Crisis (2020)
- Rake's Progress: The Madcap True Tale of My Political Midlife Crisis (2021)
