= Tom Gentleman =

Scottish painter (1892–1966)

Thomas Gentleman FSIA (13 May 1892 – 29 November 1966) was a Scottish painter and commercial artist. He was the father of artist David Gentleman.

== Early life ==
Gentleman was born in Coatbridge, Lanarkshire, in 1892. His parents were Anne Cowan (née McNaughtan) and William Russell Gentleman, who had a drapery business in the town. In April 1901, when he was nine, his father died following surgery. At the age of 13, although already apprenticed as a draper and expected to go into the family business, he began evening classes at the Glasgow School of Art, becoming in 1911 a full-time student until in 1914 he was mobilised.

== Career and First World War ==
Gentleman received his diploma from the Glasgow School of Art in 1914, after becoming a full-time student in 1911. He was awarded the Haldane Travelling Scholarship, but the outbreak of war in Europe meant that the trip had to be postponed until 1920–21. During the trip he visited Corsica, Italy, France and Spain.

In 1912, Gentleman had begun to volunteer with the Queen's Own Royal Glasgow Yeomanry. Consequently, he was mobilised for service in August 1914, until his eventual demobilisation in 1918, after which he returned to Glasgow School of Art, and continued to take classes in painting and drawing. He served with both the Scottish Rifles and the Glasgow Yeomanry.

== Painter and designer ==
Gentleman worked as a painter, printmaker, cartoonist and freelance graphic designer from 1921, periodically exhibiting his paintings. He was for a short time a teacher at the first technical college in Britain, the Coatbridge Technical School. In 1928 he moved to London, began to work in advertising, and married a fellow ex-student of Glasgow School of Art, Eugenie Winifred Murgatroyd, a painter who later became a weaver. After they moved to Hertford in 1930 they had two sons, David (born in 1930) and Hugh (born in 1935).

Gentleman worked in several advertising agencies and from 1932, in the design studio at Shell Mex. During the 1939–45 war he worked for several years for the Ministry of Information and then as a freelance, during which time he wrote and illustrated a children's book called Brae Farm, a memoir of his Scottish childhood, which was published in 1945. His best known works are his lithograph Grey Horses, published by School Prints in 1946, and two earlier posters for Shell. After the war he returned to Shell Mex as its Studio Manager. He was elected Fellow of the Society of Industrial Artists in 1947. In 1952 he retired, and in 1956 moved with Winifred to Essex, where he continued drawing and painting. Tom and Winifred Gentleman died in 1966 in Colchester, Essex.

Gentleman is listed on the Glasgow School of Art's First World War Roll of Honour.
