= Jo Johnson =

British politician (born 1971)

The Right Honourable The Lord Johnson of Marylebone PC
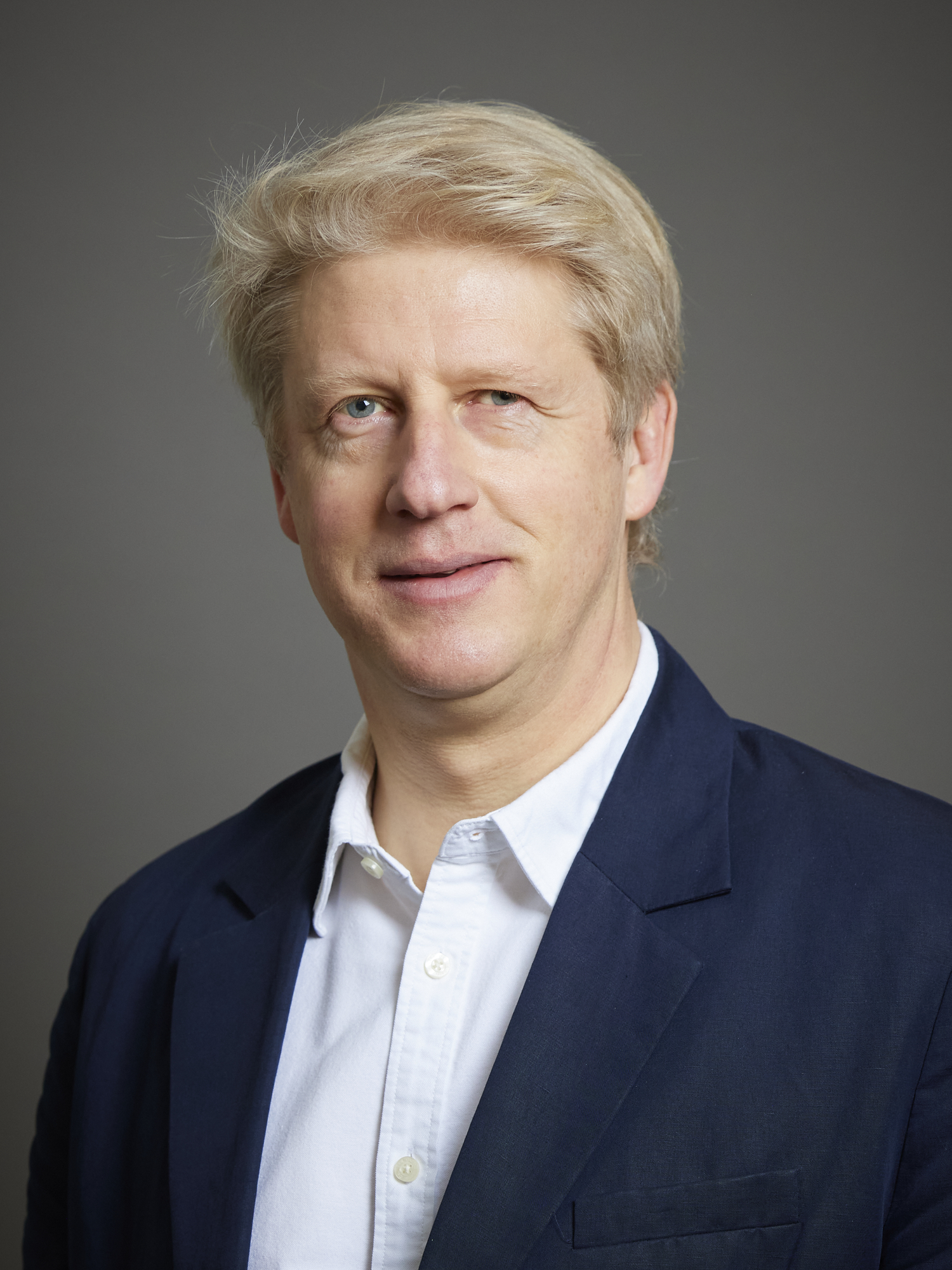
- Official portrait, 2024

Minister of State for Universities, Science, Research and Innovation
- In office 24 July 2019 – 5 September 2019
- Prime Minister: Boris Johnson
- Preceded by: Chris Skidmore
- Succeeded by: Chris Skidmore
- In office 11 May 2015 – 9 January 2018
- Prime Minister: David Cameron; Theresa May
- Preceded by: Greg Clark
- Succeeded by: Sam Gyimah

Minister for London
- In office 9 January 2018 – 9 November 2018
- Prime Minister: Theresa May
- Preceded by: Greg Hands
- Succeeded by: Nick Hurd

Minister of State for Transport
- In office 9 January 2018 – 9 November 2018
- Prime Minister: Theresa May
- Preceded by: John Hayes
- Succeeded by: Jesse Norman

Minister of State at the Cabinet Office
- In office 15 July 2014 – 11 May 2015
- Prime Minister: David Cameron
- Preceded by: Greg Clark
- Succeeded by: Chris Skidmore

Director of the Number 10 Policy Unit
- In office 25 April 2013 – 21 May 2015
- Prime Minister: David Cameron
- Preceded by: Nick Pearce
- Succeeded by: Camilla Cavendish
Parliamentary offices
Member of the House of Lords
Lord Temporal
Life peerage 12 October 2020
Member of Parliament for Orpington
In office 6 May 2010 – 6 November 2019
| Preceded by | John Horam |
| Succeeded by | Gareth Bacon |

Personal details
- Born: Joseph Edmund Johnson; 23 December 1971 (age 54) London, England
- Party: Conservative
- Spouse: Amelia Gentleman (m. 2005)
- Children: 2
- Parents: Stanley Johnson (father); Charlotte Fawcett (mother)
- Relatives: Boris Johnson (brother); Rachel Johnson (sister); Julia Johnson (half-sister); Carrie Symonds (sister-in-law); David Gentleman (father-in-law); James Fawcett (grandfather); Edmund Fawcett (uncle); Ali Kemal (great grandfather); Elias Avery Lowe (great grandfather); Helen Tracy Lowe-Porter (great grandmother); Pfeffel family (ancestors)
- Education: Balliol College, Oxford (BA); Université libre de Bruxelles; INSEAD (MBA)
- Website: Official website

Joseph Edmund Johnson, Baron Johnson of Marylebone (born 23 December 1971) is a British politician and peer who was Minister of State for Universities, Science, Research and Innovation from 2015 to 2018, and from July to September 2019. A member of the Conservative Party, he was Member of Parliament (MP) for Orpington from 2010 to 2019. He currently sits in the House of Lords. His older brother, Boris Johnson, was Prime Minister of the United Kingdom between 2019 and 2022.

Johnson was appointed Director of the Number 10 Policy Unit in 2013 by Prime Minister David Cameron. He became Minister of State for the Cabinet Office in 2014 and Universities Minister in 2015. Following the January 2018 cabinet reshuffle, Johnson served as Minister of State for Transport and Minister for London; he resigned in November the same year, citing the failure of the Brexit negotiations to achieve what had been promised by the Vote Leave campaign and his wish to campaign for a referendum on the Brexit withdrawal agreement. In July 2019, he became part of his brother's Cabinet, again as Minister of State for Universities. Johnson and his brother became the third set of brothers to have served simultaneously in Cabinet – following Edward and Oliver Stanley in 1938, and David and Ed Miliband in 2007 – with Johnson being the first to serve as the brother of an incumbent prime minister.

In September 2019, he resigned from the Cabinet and announced that he would stand down as an MP at the 2019 United Kingdom general election. In July 2020, he was elevated to the House of Lords in the 2019 Dissolution Honours. He is Chairman of the House of Lords Select Committee on Education for 11–16 year olds.

Since leaving Government, Johnson has focused on the role of technology in widening access to education. He was appointed non-executive chairman at Tes in December 2019. He is also now chairman of Access Creative College, the largest independent provider of further education and training for the creative industries, and of FutureLearn, the global digital learning platform. He is also a senior fellow at the Harvard Kennedy School, and President's Professorial Fellow at King's College London. He has since returned to his work as a journalist at outlets including the Financial Times.

Johnson resigned his directorship after 8 months service, at Elara Capital PLC on the 1 February 2023. His resignation statement, (by email) acknowledged recognition that his former role "requires greater domain expertise in specialised areas of financial regulation than I anticipated and, accordingly, I have resigned from the board."

== Early life ==
=== Family ===
Johnson was born in London. He is the youngest of four children of former Conservative MEP Stanley Johnson and artist Charlotte Johnson Wahl (née Fawcett), the daughter of Sir James Fawcett, a barrister and president of the European Commission of Human Rights from 1972 to 1981. Johnson is the brother of Boris Johnson, the former Prime Minister of the United Kingdom and Conservative MP for Uxbridge and South Ruislip; Rachel, a journalist; and Leo, an entrepreneur, filmmaker and partner at the professional services firm, PricewaterhouseCoopers LLP.

=== Education ===
Johnson first attended the European School in Uccle, before attending The Hall School in Hampstead, London, Ashdown House School in East Sussex, and then Eton College. In 1991, he went to Balliol College, Oxford, to read Modern History. He was a Scholar at Balliol, edited Isis, the Oxford University student magazine, and was awarded a First Class degree in both Honour Moderations (June 1992) and Finals (Honour School, June 1994).

While at Oxford, he was a member of the Bullingdon Club together with Harry Mount, Nathaniel Rothschild and George Osborne, with whom he remains a close friend.

== Career in journalism ==
After graduating from the Université libre de Bruxelles, in 1995 Johnson joined Deutsche Bank as an investment banker.

In 1997, he switched career paths and joined the Financial Times. After a sabbatical in 1999/2000 during which he gained an MBA from INSEAD, he returned to become Paris correspondent (2001–05), and then as South Asia bureau chief based in New Delhi (2005–08). On return to London he became an associate editor of the Financial Times and head of the Lex Column, one of the most influential positions in British financial journalism.

Previous 'Heads of Lex' include Nigel Lawson, former Chancellor of the Exchequer, Martin Taylor, former chief executive of Barclays Bank, and Richard Lambert, director-general of the Confederation of British Industry. Johnson left the Lex column in April 2010. He received awards for his journalism from a range of organisations, including the Foreign Press Association, the Society of Publishers in Asia and The Indian Express's Excellence in Journalism Awards.

Johnson's books include the co-authored The Man Who Tried To Buy the World (Penguin, 2003), about the French businessman Jean-Marie Messier. This was serialised in The Guardian and published in France as Une faillite française by Albin Michel in 2002. He co-edited, with Rajiv Kumar (secretary general, Federation of Indian Chambers of Commerce and Industry) Reconnecting Britain and India: Ideas for an Enhanced Partnership (Academic Foundation 2011).

He commentated on radio and television, and spoke in public on the rise of India, as well as on the UK political economy and financial affairs.

== Parliamentary career ==
In 2009, he was selected as the Conservative parliamentary candidate for the safe seat of Orpington in the London Borough of Bromley from a shortlist of six contenders. At the 2010 general election, he retained the seat for the Conservatives, tripling the majority of his predecessor John Horam to over 17,000. His majority increased again in the general election of 2015, to 19,979.

He increased the Conservative share of the vote in the constituency by 5.5% points to 62.9% at the general election in June 2017, although his majority declined to 19,453.

=== Head of the Downing Street Policy Unit ===
On 25 April 2013, he was appointed head of the Number 10 Policy Unit by David Cameron to help develop the 2015 Conservative manifesto.

As a junior Cabinet Office minister, he headed the Policy Unit in the Prime Minister's Office, and also chaired a newly created Conservative Parliamentary advisory board, known as the Prime Minister's Policy Board, consisting of Conservative MPs.

Johnson's appointment to head up the Downing Street policy unit was viewed as surprising by The Guardian as he was perceived as being more pro-European and left-leaning than most Conservatives.

=== Minister for Universities and Science ===
On 11 May 2015, it was announced that Johnson had been appointed Minister for Universities and Science at the Department for Business, Innovation and Skills (BIS). Writing about Johnson's appointment for Times Higher Education, John Morgan said: "Mr Johnson's reputation as a pro-European is likely to please vice-chancellors, many of whom are concerned by the Tories' pledge to hold an in-out referendum on EU membership by 2017. Universities UK pointed out that British higher education institutions benefit from around £1.2 billion in European research funding each year."

In this role, Johnson introduced the Higher Education and Research Act 2017, which the Times Higher Education described as the most significant legislation in 25 years. This overhauled the regulatory framework for English universities, replaced the Higher Education Funding Council for England with a new regulator, the Office for Students, and established mechanisms to hold universities more accountable for the quality of teaching and student outcomes. The Act also created a new single national strategic research body, UK Research and Innovation, bringing together the UK's fragmented research funding bodies.

=== Minister of Transport ===
On 9 January 2018, Johnson left his role as Minister for Universities and accepted a new position as Minister of Transport and Minister for London.

On 9 November 2018, Johnson resigned his position, citing disillusionment with the government's Brexit strategy and called for a fresh vote on Brexit with an option to remain. Johnson argued that Britain was "on the brink of the greatest crisis" since World War Two and claimed that what was on offer was not "anything like what was promised".

=== Brexit ===
Johnson called on his Conservative Party MPs to vote down Theresa May's Brexit deal on 11 December 2018, stating that it was 'half baked' and the 'worst of both worlds'. Johnson resigned as a minister in December 2018 because he wanted to be free to endorse a proposed referendum on the Brexit withdrawal agreement.

=== Minister in Boris Johnson's Cabinet ===
On 24 July 2019, it was announced that Jo Johnson was appointed Minister of State for Universities, Science, Research and Innovation – this position would mean he would be attending the meetings of the cabinet. He was appointed to the privy council the next day. On 5 September, Johnson resigned as a Minister and announced he would stand down as MP, describing his position as "torn between family and national interest". He stood down at the next general election rather than resigning. A Downing Street spokesman said: "The prime minister would like to thank Jo Johnson for his service... The constituents of Orpington could not have asked for a better representative."

=== House of Lords ===
On 31 July 2020, the announcement was made of Johnson's elevation to the House of Lords as part of the 2019 Dissolution Honours. It was his elder brother Boris Johnson who established his peerage. He was created Baron Johnson of Marylebone, of Marylebone in the City of Westminster, on 29 October. He delivered his maiden speech on the afternoon of Thursday 4 March 2021.

== Personal life ==
Johnson lives in London with his wife, Amelia Gentleman, a journalist for The Guardian, the daughter of artist and designer David Gentleman. The couple have two children.

Parliament of the United Kingdom
| Preceded by John Horam | Member of Parliament for Orpington; 2010–2019 | Succeeded by Gareth Bacon |
Political offices
| Preceded by Greg Clark | Minister of State at the Cabinet Office; 2014–2015 | Succeeded by Chris Skidmore |
| Preceded by Greg Clark | Minister of State for Universities; 2015–2018 | Succeeded by Sam Gyimah |
| Preceded by Greg Hands | Minister for London; 2018 | Succeeded by Nick Hurd |
| Preceded by John Hayes | Minister of State for Transport; 2018 | Succeeded by Michael Ellis |
| Preceded by Chris Skidmore | Minister of State for Universities; 2019 | Succeeded by Chris Skidmore |
Orders of precedence in the United Kingdom
| Preceded by The Lord Hammond of Runnymede | Gentlemen; Baron Johnson of Marylebone | Followed by The Lord Woodley |
