= George Ewart Evans =

Welsh writer, schoolteacher and folklorist

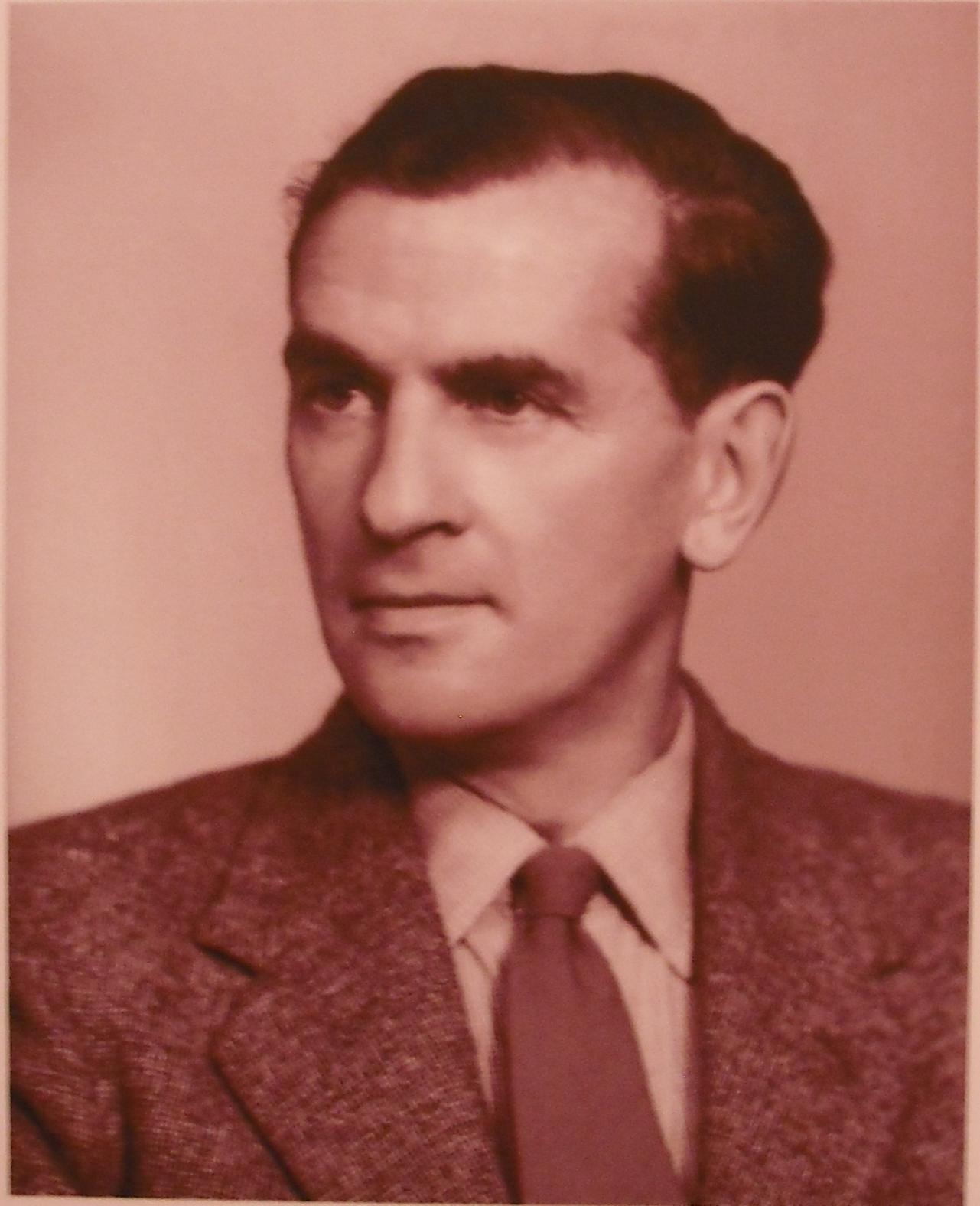
- Born: 1 April 1909; Abercynon, Glamorgan, Wales
- Died: 11 January 1988 (aged 78); Brooke, Norfolk, England
- Occupations: Folklorist; writer
- Spouse: Ellen Florence Knappett
- Children: Matthew Evans, Baron Evans of Temple Guiting

George Ewart Evans (1 April 1909 – 11 January 1988) was a Welsh folklorist also known as a schoolteacher, writer, editor and sportsman.

Writing in both English and Welsh and known as a frequent broadcaster and lecturer, Evans was also a professional athlete and branch secretary of the Cambridge Communist Party. A dedicated collector of oral history and oral tradition in the East Anglian countryside from the 1940s to 1970s, Evans produced eleven books of collections of these materials.

== Life and career ==
=== Early life ===
The third of eleven children, Evans was born in Abercynon, a coal-mining community in the Cynon Valley. His parents owned a grocer's store adjoining the Calfaria chapel where Evans and his siblings attended Sunday school and the family was typical of the Non-conformist, Welsh speaking "Liberal-Labour" radicals. As such, Evans was given his unusual middle name in honour of the Liberal Prime Minister William Ewart Gladstone.

Evans attended Abertâf Elementary school and the Mountain Ash County School where he gained more attention for his athletic prowess than his modest academic successes. Evans assisted in the family business, travelling by pony and trap through the neighbouring farms and villages on delivery rounds until the business closed following the 1924–1925 coal strike. The suffering of the local communities during the Post–World War I recession informed much of Evans political leanings and ultimately led him join the newly established Communist Party of Great Britain.

In 1927 Evans enrolled at University College Cardiff, a course he self-financed by coaching athletics and running in professional competitions across the south Wales valleys. At University, Evans again won more distinction as a sportsman (captaining the College's rugby team) than for the second class honours degree in Classics. Evans continued to play rugby after University, establishing himself as a formidable wing three-quarter for the then first-class side, Mountain Ash RFC.

=== Early career and war years ===
Evans became certified for teaching in 1931 but was unable to find a teaching position for three years, moving to London before finally becoming the physical education teacher at Sawston Village College, Cambridgeshire. Here Evans pursued his writing ambitions, and became a published author of poems and short-stories from 1937 onwards, it was also during this period that he met his fellow teacher Ellen Florence Knappett, with the two marrying in 1938. Evans' early work drew mainly on his Welsh mining background and he is said to have contributed to "the renaissance of Welsh writing in English that grew apace in that decade". One of Evans' earlier works, an English language radio play about a mining disaster, won first prize at the Denbigh National Eisteddfod in 1939.

With the outbreak of the Second World War, Evans worked as a Royal Air Force radio technician, however this marked the beginning of an unhappy period in Evans' life. After a brief period in London, Evans found himself living with his wife's family in the Home Counties where he became seriously depressed following a poor reception to his 1947 semi-autobiographical novel The Voices of the Children and the development of a hearing impairment which frustrated his return to teaching.

=== Life in East Anglia ===
In 1948 Evans moved to the remote Suffolk village of Blaxhall where his wife Ellen had taken the position of schoolmistress. While Ellen worked, Evans devoted himself full-time to his writing and raising their children. It was during this period that he developed film scripts for the BBC as well as the script for the Rayant Pictures film The Secret of the Forest in 1955.

Despite Evans' mental state and the village's isolation, Evans was greatly inspired by interactions with his elderly neighbours and the Suffolk farm workers which he described as "flesh and blood archives". Folklore now became the focus of his life's work and after many rejections his first book about the people of Blaxhall; Ask The Fellows Who Cut The Hay was published by Faber and Faber in 1956. Though George often pondered a permanent return to Wales, the Evans family remained in East Anglia, moving first to Needham Market in 1956 and then to Helmingham in 1962 to follow Ellen's teaching posts. As such, Evans recorded what become an extensive oral history of the culture and dialect throughout the area. Evans also continued to write short stories and poetry throughout the 1950s as well as editing a volume of Welsh Short Stories in 1959. Evans' interest in horse folklore (especially the Welsh folk tradition of the Mari Lwyd) inspired his next work The Horse in the Furrow in 1960.

=== Later years ===
Evans in later life

Following Ellen's retirement the family settled in Brooke, Norfolk, where George continued to write. He published two volumes of his own stories set in East Anglia in 1974, before returning to his roots for the 1976 work, From Mouths of Men a book recording the experiences of drift-miners in the Dulais Valley. Evans continued to write in the Welsh language and maintained enduring friendships with Welsh folklorists Iorwerth Peate and Ffransis G. Payne. Even his East-Anglian writings contain frequent reference to Welsh literature, with his epigraph to Where Beards Wag All featuring Y Llafurwr, a fourteenth century cywydd by the Welsh bard Iolo Goch, alongside Evans' own English translation entitled "The Farmworker".

Evans died in Brooke on 11 January 1988, and was cremated in Norwich. His ashes were taken back to south Wales and scattered on the hills above Abercynon. Ellen died at Brooke 19 September 1999. Their son was the publisher and Labour politician, Matthew Evans, Baron Evans of Temple Guiting, while their daughter Susan is married to artist David Gentleman.

== Influence ==
Evans' ideas about folklore were shaped by the writers James Frazer, Margaret Murray, T. C. Lethbridge and Robert Graves. He maintained a long correspondence with Graves, whose work Evans admired; later in his life Evans would criticise academics for their dismissal of Graves' book The White Goddess. Evans collaborated with his friend David Thomson of the BBC on the book The Leaping Hare. Although his books have a strong flavour of memory and nostalgia, they record a time (extending back into the nineteenth century) that was hard and to which one would not seriously wish to return. He did not add a gloss of romance to his materials, but assumed and accepted the truthfulness of his informants.

Of the Blaxhall countryman, Evans wrote:

His knowledge is not a personal knowledge but has been available to him through oral tradition which is the unselfconscious medium of transmission. It is in his bones, you could say, and nonetheless valuable for that.... It was here at this time, and with the dressing and elaborating on it later, that I transposed the Blaxhall community in my own mind into its true place in an ancient historical sequence, keeping the continuity that was for ever changing, and for ever remaining the same, until an irreparable break substituted the machines for animal power, and put an end to a period that had lasted well over two thousand years.(The Crooked Scythe, pp.197-198)

Terry Pratchett described Evans's work (specifically regarding his book The Leaping Hare cowritten with David Thomson) as speaking "to the men who worked on the land—not from the cab of a tractor, but with horses—and they saw the wildlife around them. I suspect that maybe they had put a little bit of a shine on the things they told him, but everything is all the better for a little bit of shine".

Evans' life and works feature as a permanent exhibition at the Museum of East Anglian Life in Stowmarket, Suffolk.

== Bibliography ==
- Three poems, in Modern Welsh Poetry, Keidrych Rhys (ed.), Faber and Faber, London, 1944
- The Voices of the Children, Penmark Press, 1947
- The Fitton Four-Poster, Blackie and Son, 1954
- Ask The Fellows Who Cut The Hay, Faber and Faber, 1956 (2009 edition illus. by David Gentleman)
- Welsh Short Stories, G. E. Evans (ed), with his own story, The Medal), Faber and Faber 1959, 2nd edn.
- The Horse in the Furrow, Faber and Faber 1960
- The Pattern Under the Plough: Aspects of the Folk-Life of East Anglia, Faber and Faber, 1966, Little Toller Books, 2013, introduced by Patrick Barkham
- The Farm and the Village, Faber and Faber 1969
- Where Beards Wag All: The Relevance of the Oral Tradition, Faber and Faber, 1970
- Tools of Their Trades: An Oral History of Men at Work c. 1900, Taplinger Publishing Company, 1971, ISBN 0-8008-7747-0 (illus. by David Gentleman)
- The Leaping Hare, G. E. Evans and David Thomson, Faber and Faber, 1972
- Acky, Faber and Faber, 1973
- The Days That We Have Seen, Faber and Faber, 1975
- Let Dogs Delight and Other Stories, Faber and Faber, 1975
- From Mouths Of Men, Faber and Faber, 1976
- Horse Power and Magic, Faber and Faber, 1979
- The Strength of the Hills: An Autobiography, Faber and Faber, 1983; Farrar, Straus and Giroux, New York City)
- Spoken History, Faber and Faber, 1987
- The Crooked Scythe. An Anthology of Oral History, (ed. and illus. by David Gentleman), Faber and Faber, 1993

== Criticism ==
- Gareth Williams (1991), George Ewart Evans, University of Wales Press, (Writers of Wales series)
