= Straw (disambiguation) =

Straw is an agricultural by-product of cereal plants.

Straw may also refer to:

- Straw (colour)
- Drinking straw

== Entertainment ==
- Straw (band), an English pop band
- "Straw" (story), a short story by Gene Wolfe
- Straw, a board game by Alderac Entertainment Group
- The Straw (play), a 1919 play by Eugene O'Neill
- "The Straw" (The Bronx Is Burning), a television episode
- Straw (film), a 2025 film directed by Tyler Perry

== Science ==
- Straw (cryogenic storage), a vessel for storing liquids at very low temperatures for long-term preservation
- Barred straw, a moth
- Soda straw or straw, a mineral
- Straw underwing, a moth

== People ==
- Ezekiel A. Straw (1819–1882), American business manager and politician
- Jack Straw (disambiguation)
- Myles Straw (born 1994), American baseball player
- Syd Straw, American singer
- Thomas Straw (1870–1959), British cricketer

== Places ==
- Straw, Kentucky
- Straw, County Londonderry, a small village and townland in County Londonderry, Northern Ireland
- Straws, County Tyrone, a townland in County Tyrone, Northern Ireland

== See also ==
- Straw man (disambiguation)
