= Man of Straw =

- Man of Straw (novel), Der Untertan
- Man of Straw (film), 1951
- Man of Straw (miniseries), 1972 BBC mini-series based on Der Untertan, with Derek Jacobi as Hessling
- A Man of Straw (L'uomo di paglia), 1958 film by Pietro Germi
- A straw man form of argument

== Music ==
- Man of Straw (Viking album), 1989
- "Man of Straw" Sad Lovers & Giants 1983

== See also ==
- Woman of Straw (1964)
