= Robert Muller (screenwriter) =

British screenwriter and journalist (1925–1998)

- Born: 1 September 1925; Hamburg, Germany
- Died: 27 May 1998 (aged 72); London, United Kingdom
- Occupation: Writer
- Years active: 1956–1991 (film & TV)
- Relatives: Billie Whitelaw (wife), Sophie Muller (daughter), Mae Muller (granddaughter)

Robert Muller (1 September 1925 – 27 May 1998) was a German-born British journalist and screenwriter, who mainly worked in television. Since his father was Jewish, he emigrated to Britain in 1938 as a thirteen-year-old refugee from Nazi Germany.

== Selected works ==
=== Novel ===
- Virginities (1982)

=== Film ===
- Woman of Straw (1964)
- The Beauty Jungle (1964)
- I'm an Elephant, Madame (1969)
- The Roaring Fifties (1983)

=== Television ===
- London Playhouse: "Jane Clegg" (dir. Peter Cotes, 1956)
- Armchair Theatre: "The Night Conspirators" (Philip Saville, 1962)
- Armchair Theatre: "Afternoon of a Nymph" (1962)
- Armchair Theatre: "Thank You and Goodnight" (1962)
- Armchair Theatre: "The Paradise Suite" (1963)
- Playdate: "The Night Conspirators" (1963)
- Armchair Theatre: "Pleasure Is Where She Finds It" (Charles Jarrott, 1964)
- Story Parade: "The World That Summer" (Peter Sasdy, 1965)
- Armchair Mystery Theatre: "Man and Mirror" (Patrick Dromgoole, 1965)
- Armchair Theatre: "A Cold Peace" (Don Leaver, 1965)
- Mystery and Imagination: "The Body Snatcher" (Toby Robertson, 1966)
- Die Gentlemen bitten zur Kasse (John Olden and Claus Peter Witt, 1966, TV miniseries) — based on a non-fiction book by Henry Kolarz
- The Wednesday Play: "The Executioner" (Michael Hayes, 1966)
- Die Unberatenen (Peter Zadek, 1966) — based on a novel by Thomas Valentin
- Out of the Unknown: "The Prophet" (Naomi Capon, 1967) — based on "Reason" by Isaac Asimov
- Armchair Theatre: "Easier in the Dark" (Don Leaver, 1967)
- Armchair Theatre: "A World of Time" (Don Leaver, 1967)
- Theatre 625: "Henry IV" (Michael Hayes, 1967) — based on Luigi Pirandello's Henry IV
- Haunted: "After the Funeral" (Don Leaver, 1967)
- The Wednesday Play: "Death of a Private" (James Ferman, 1967) — loosely based on Woyzeck
- Man in a Suitcase: "The Bridge" (Pat Jackson, 1967)
- Armchair Theatre: "You and Me" (Kim Mills, 1968)
- Nana (John Davies, 1968, TV miniseries)
- Mystery and Imagination: "Frankenstein" (Voytek, 1968)
- Out of the Unknown: "Beach Head" (James Cellan Jones, 1969) — based on a story by Clifford D. Simak
- Out of the Unknown: "The Naked Sun" (Rudolph Cartier, 1969)
- Mystery and Imagination: "The Suicide Club" (Mike Vardy, 1970)
- Take Three Girls (1971, TV series, 4 episodes)
- Bel Ami (John Davies, 1971, TV miniseries) — based on Guy de Maupassant's Bel-Ami
- Die Sonne angreifen (Peter Lilienthal, 1971) — based on a novel by Witold Gombrowicz
- Public Eye: "Shades of White" (Piers Haggard, 1971)
- Man of Straw (Herbert Wise, 1972, TV miniseries) — based on Der Untertan by Heinrich Mann
- Van der Valk und das Mädchen (Peter Zadek, 1972) — based on a novel by Nicolas Freeling
- The Song of Songs (Peter Wood, 1973, TV miniseries)
- Van der Valk und die Reichen (Wolfgang Petersen, 1973) — based on a novel by Nicolas Freeling
- Colditz: "Chameleon" (Philip Dudley, 1974)
- Fall of Eagles: "Indian Summer of an Emperor" (Donald McWhinnie, 1974)
- Omnibus: "The Need for Nightmare" (Harley Cokeliss, 1974)
- Churchill's People: "The Lost Island" (Philip Saville, 1975) — based on A History of the English-Speaking Peoples
- A Legacy (Derek Martinus, 1975, TV miniseries)
- Private Affairs: "A Dream of Living" (Philip Saville, 1975)
- Van der Valk und die Toten (Marcel Cravenne, 1975) — based on a novel by Nicolas Freeling
- Ten from the Twenties: "Motherlove" (Mark Cullingham, 1975) — based on a story by J. D. Beresford
- Ten from the Twenties: "Her Wedding Morn" (Barry Letts, 1975) — based on a story by Sheila Kaye-Smith
- Ten from the Twenties: "The Fifty Pound Note" (Mark Cullingham, 1975) — based on a story by A. E. Coppard
- Supernatural: "Ghosts of Venice" (Claude Whatham, 1977)
- Supernatural: "Countess Ilona" (Simon Langton, 1977)
- Supernatural: "The Werewolf Reunion" (Simon Langton, 1977)
- Supernatural: "Mr Nightingale" (Alan Cooke, 1977)
- Supernatural: "Lady Sybil" (Simon Langton, 1977)
- The Hunchback of Notre Dame (Alan Cooke, 1977) — based on The Hunchback of Notre-Dame
- Supernatural: "Night of the Marionettes" (Alan Cooke, 1977)
- Supernatural: "Dorabella" (Simon Langton, 1977)
- Prince Regent (Michael Simpson and Michael Hayes, 1979, TV miniseries)
- The World That Summer (Ilse Hofmann, 1980)
- Exil (Egon Günther, 1981, TV miniseries) — based on a novel by Lion Feuchtwanger
- Blood and Honor: Youth Under Hitler (Bernd Fischerauer, 1982, TV miniseries)
- Russian Night... 1941 (Desmond Davis, 1982) — based on a story by Aleksandr Solzhenitsyn
- Ein Kleid von Dior (Peter Weck, 1982) — based on Mrs. 'Arris Goes to Paris by Paul Gallico
- Nachruf auf Othello (Michael Braun, 1983) — based on a novel by Nino Erné
- Storyboard: "Secrets" (Peter Sasdy, 1983)
- End of the World (Imo Moszkowicz, 1984) — based on Der letzte Sonntag by Milo Dor
- Die Fräulein von damals (Dietrich Haugk, 1986)
- Albert Schweitzer (Michael Braun, 1987, TV miniseries)
- Rothenbaumchaussee (Dietrich Haugk, 1991)

== Bibliography ==
- Anthony Grenville. Refugees from the Third Reich in Britain. Rodopi, 2002.
