= Straw man (disambiguation) =

A straw man is a form of argument and an informal fallacy.

Straw man or strawman may also refer to:

== General ==
- Straw man (dummy), a dummy made from straw from which the other concepts take their names
- Craterocephalus stramineus, a species of fish

== Law and commerce ==
- Straw man (law), in law, a third party that acts as a front in a transaction
- Straw man proposal, in business and software development, a simple draft proposal to generate discussion
- Strawman theory, a pseudolegal theory in the sovereign citizen, tax protester, freeman, and redemption movements

== Publications ==
- Straw Man (novel), a 1951 novel by Doris Miles Disney
- The Straw Man, a 1957 novel by Jean Giono
- Straw Man (comics), a 1975 Marvel Comics character
- Straw Men (novel), a 2001 novel by Martin J. Smith
- The Straw Men, a 2002 novel by Michael Marshall

== Film ==
- The Straw Man (film), a 1953 British film
- Strawman (film), a 1987 Taiwanese film

== Music ==
- "Strawman", a 1989 song by Lou Reed from New York
- "Straw Man", a 2019 song by Silversun Pickups from Widow's Weeds

== See also ==
- Corn dolly, a humanoid figure woven from plant stems
- Man of Straw (disambiguation)
- Scarecrow (disambiguation)
- Der Untertan, a 1918 novel by Heinrich Mann
- Der Untertan (film), a 1951 East German film
- Wicker man (disambiguation)
