= Reflections of a Nonpolitical Man =

1918 work by Thomas Mann

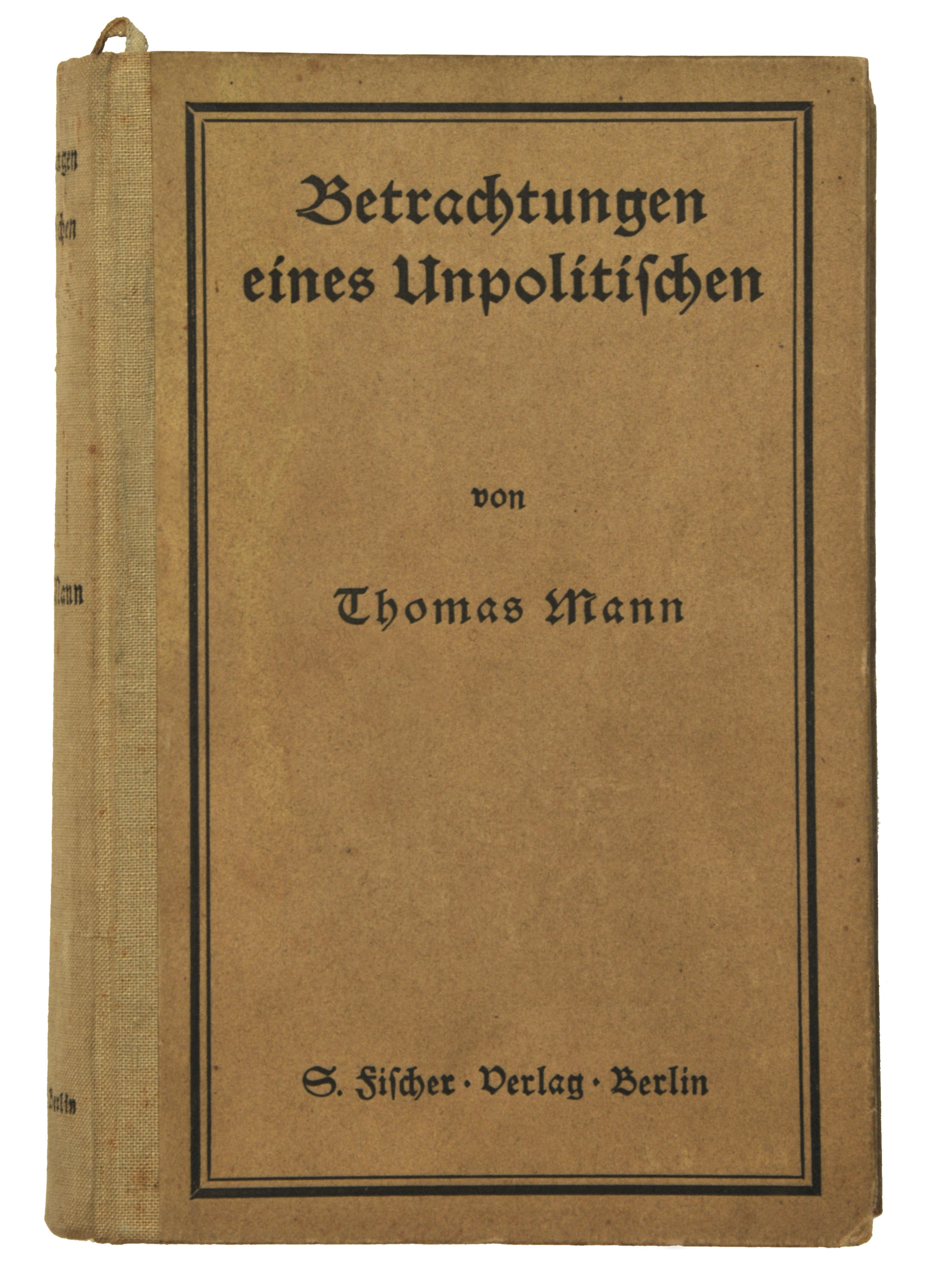
- 1918 first edition
- Author: Thomas Mann
- Original title: Betrachtungen eines Unpolitischen
- Translator: Walter D. Morris
- Language: German
- Publisher: S. Fischer Verlag
- Publication date: 1918
- Publication place: German Empire
- English publication date: 1983
- Media type: Print
- OCLC: 3512292
- Dewey Decimal: 838.91
- LC Class: PT2625.A44 B513
- Original text: Betrachtungen eines Unpolitischen at Internet Archive
- Translation: Reflections of a Nonpolitical Man at Internet Archive

The Reflections of a Nonpolitical Man (German: Betrachtungen eines Unpolitischen) is a non-fiction work by the German author Thomas Mann published in 1918. Unlike his brother Heinrich, Thomas Mann supported the German war effort during World War I. The book, which runs to almost six hundred pages, defends the authoritarianism and "culture" of Germany against the "civilization" of the West. It served to justify and distinguish his conservative political stance from that of his more liberally oriented brother.

== Writing and publication history ==
=== Background ===
Thomas Mann – like many of his fellow German writers – had a positive attitude towards the German war effort during World War I. In three essays written after the outbreak of the war in 1914 – Gedanken im Kriege ("Thoughts in Wartime" [August/September 1914]), Gute Feldpost ("Good News from the Front" [October 1914]) and Friedrich und die große Koalition ("Frederick and the Great Coalition" [September to December 1914]) – he defended German warfare and first promulgated his support for the Ideas of 1914.

Romain Rolland and other French authors criticised this literary support for Germany and in particular the support of the German invasion of neutral Belgium. Rolland from time to time also criticised Mann personally for his pro-war stance and substantiated this reproach in the essay Les Idoles, which was later published as part of the essay collection Au-dessus de la mêlée. In this essay he criticised Thomas Mann's militarism and ill-advised fanaticism. This reproach was a major impulse for Mann to begin writing the Reflections; he specifically answered Rolland in the chapter called "Against Justice and Truth". From the summer of 1915 onwards, he started to arrange his material to support Germany in intellectual and cultural terms.

The impulse for authoring the book was intensified by an essay on Émile Zola written by his brother Heinrich Mann, which appeared in René Schickele's pacifist journal Die Weißen Blätter in autumn 1915. This essay contained swipes at his unnamed brother and painted him as a patriotic propagandist. According to the scholar Heinrich Kurzke, this essay caused Thomas Mann to expand his material from a mere essay into a whole book.

=== Writing process ===
The writing (fall 1915 to February 1918) of the Reflections has been divided into four phases by Alexander Honold: first, the beginning of the drafting process in the wake of Thomas Mann's war essays in the second half of 1915; second, his engagement with the Zivilisationsliteraten ("Civilization's Literary Men") and the elaboration of the dichotomy between "culture" and "civilisation", which deals with his brother after the publication of the Zola essay; third, the long discussion of a set of typological dichotomies; finally, the incorporation of aesthetic considerations (for example, the discussion of Hans Pfitzner's opera Palestrina). The writing ended with the drafting of the prologue in February 1918, which gives commentary on the overall layout of the book.

=== Publication history and translations ===
The book was published shortly before the armistice in October 1918. It was not translated into English during Thomas Mann's lifetime. According to Tobias Boes, the non-translation of the work during his lifetime was intentional on Mann's part due to chauvinistic content of the book which could have led to his abandonment by the American public. The first English translation by Walter D. Morris under the title Reflections of a Nonpolitical Man was published in 1983 by Frederick Unger Publishing Company. This translation was republished in 2021 as a NYRB Classic with an introduction by Mark Lilla.

== Motifs ==
The Reflections of a Nonpolitical Man has been recognised as a wartime treatise. Thomas Mann saw his work as "intellectual military service" in the confrontation between German "culture" and French and British "civilisation".

Christopher Beha argues that the central motif of the Reflections is the dichotomy between "civilization" and "culture". Civilization, according to Thomas Mann, "involves reason, enlightenment, moderation, moral education, skepticism". Culture represents the opposite for him, namely "the sublimation of the demonic". He assaults Civilization’s Literary Men (Zivilisationsliteraten), because they treat "culture as a means, rather than an end in itself."

== Content ==
=== Prologue [Vorrede] ===
The "Prologue" is a reflection on the work written in previous three years. Mann provides the main reasons for the writing of this long treatise and introduces its main themes:

The difference between intellect and politics includes that of culture and civilization, of soul and society, of freedom and voting rights, of art and literature; and German tradition is culture, soul, freedom, art, and not civilization, society, voting rights, and literature. The difference between intellect and politics, as a further example, is the difference between cosmopolitan and international. The former concept comes from the cultural sphere and is German; the latter comes from the sphere of civilization and democracy and is – something quite different.

— Thomas Mann

=== Chapter 1: The Protest [Der Protest] ===
The first chapter of the book is noticeably short. In it, Mann uses Fyodor Dostoevsky to explain that Germany as the country has always protested against the Roman Catholic and Western world.

=== Chapter 2: The Unliterary Country [Das unliterarische Land] ===
In the brief second chapter, the "Roman" Western world is described as being literary, while Germany is introduced as the "unliterary country".

=== Chapter 3: Civilisation's Literary Man [Der Zivilisationsliterat] ===
In the third chapter, the "Francophile" progressive authors (his brother Heinrich being one of them) are introduced as Civilisation's Literary Men (Zivilisationsliteraten). The ideal of Civilisation's Literary Men is democratisation, which Mann considers to be antithetical to Germany's inner nature.

=== Chapter 4: Soul-Searching [Einkehr] ===
In the chapter titled "Soul-Searching", Mann explains the significance of the "triumvirate" of Arthur Schopenhauer, Richard Wagner and Friedrich Nietzsche as the inspirators for his thinking.

=== Chapter 5: Burgherly Nature [Bürgerlichkeit] ===
In "Burgherly Nature", Mann contrasts the solidity of burgherly individualist ethics with the bottomlessness of ethicists.

=== Chapter 6: "Against Justice and Truth" ["Gegen Recht und Wahrheit"] ===
The chapter "Against Justice and Truth" has a paraphrased quotation from Heinrich Mann's Zola essay as its title. In it, Mann defends his early wartime essays against his brother Heinrich and Romain Rolland.

=== Chapter 7: Politics [Politik] ===
The chapter on politics is by far the longest. Here Mann defines aestheticism as freedom from politics. He then turns to deliberations inspired by Emil Hammacher and Paul de Lagarde about Bismarck, the state, conservatism, suffrage, democracy, politicised art and Germany in 1914.

=== Chapter 8: On Virtue [Von der Tugend] ===
In his chapter on virtue, Mann opposes the virtue of Civilisation's Literary Men (Zivilisationsliteraten) which relies on buzzwords and contrasts it with the pessimistic ethos of Joseph von Eichendorff's Memoirs of a Good-for-Nothing, Paul Claudel's L'Annonce faite à Marie and Hans Pfitzner's opera Palestrina.

=== Chapter 9: Some Comments on Humanity [Einiges über Menschlichkeit] ===
In his comments on humanity, Mann develops a humanity of suffering and service.

=== Chapter 10: On belief [Vom Glauben] ===
Fyodor Dostoevsky inspires the chapter "On belief". According to Mann, true faith is not faith in any principles, words and ideas such as freedom, equality, democracy, civilisation and progress, but faith in God, meaning, at the same time, faith in love, life and art.

=== Chapter 11: On Aestheticism [Ästhetische Politik] ===
The last two chapters of the work deal with aestheticism. In "On Aestheticism", Mann explains that political artistry is false because he considers it to be half intellectual, intentional and artificial. The chapter ends with a notable critique of expressionism and satire.

=== Chapter 12: Irony and Radicalism [Ironie und Radikalismus] ===
In the closing chapter on "Irony and Radicalism", Mann marks his work as being inspired by irony. The works of Civilisation's Literary Men (Zivilisationsliteraten) are in contrast characterised as works of radicalism. The scholar Hermann Kurzke explains that Mann sees irony as conservative self-denial of the spirit in favour of life, which is supposed to stand against the anti-life radicalism and activism of the spirit.

== Legacy and modern reception ==
Thomas Mann never fully denounced the views espoused in the Reflections, even after the 1929 Nobel laureate had become one of the main opponents of Nazism among German expatriates in the United States. Instead, he viewed the work as a crucial step on his journey as a writer.

Christopher Beha argues that the Reflections are "a strange, frequently off-putting book, a 500-page assault on democracy, enlightenment and reason", but sees value in the idea that "we do damage to life's most important elements when we use them instrumentally, for political ends". By exposing this he sees the book as posing "a real challenge to our moment, obsessed as it is with the political responsibility of the artist."
