= Her First Romance =

Her First Romance may refer to:

- Her First Romance (1940 film), an American musical comedy film
- Her First Romance (1951 film), an American drama romance film
