= Professor Unrat =

1905 novel by Heinrich Mann

Professor Unrat, oder Das Ende eines Tyrannen
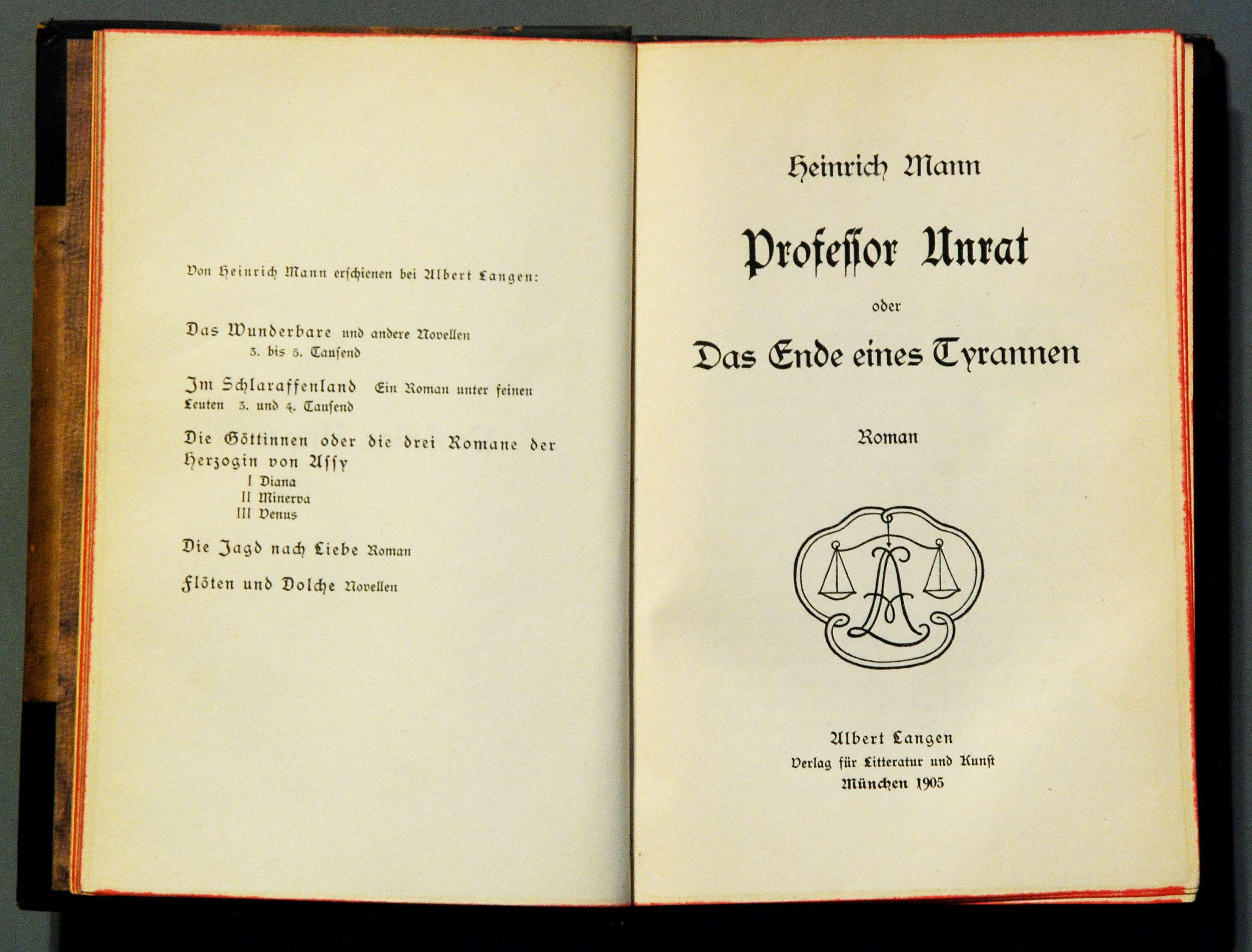
- Author: Heinrich Mann
- Language: German
- Publisher: Albert Langen
- Publication date: 1905

Professor Unrat, oder Das Ende eines Tyrannen (1905, trans. by Ernest Boyd as Small Town Tyrant), which translates as "Professor Garbage", is one of the most important works of Heinrich Mann, and has achieved notoriety through film adaptations, most notably Der blaue Engel with Marlene Dietrich. The book caricatures the middle and upper class educational system of Wilhelmine Germany and the double standards of the title character. In the United States, an abridgment of the English translation was published in 1932 under the title The Blue Angel.

The novel starts with a reclusive school teacher in his late 50s. He has alienated his son, and he treats his students as foes. By reading a student's notebook, he discovers the existence of a local dancer and the apparent admiration of his students for her. He confronts her in her dressing room, he accuses her of corrupting the students, and he tries to intimidate her into fleeing the town. She manages to charm him into becoming a submissive lover and husband to her, ruining his career in the process.

== Plot summary ==
The protagonist is Raat, a 57-year-old reclusive, widowed school teacher who is estranged from his son because of the son's academic laxity and scandalous trysts with women. Even though everyone around is either a former student of his or a descendant thereof, Raat is not held in high regard by his students. He takes the nickname "Unrat" (literally meaning "garbage") to be a personal affront, and treats every school-day as a battle against his foes, the students, and uses impossible assignments as his means of achieving victory.

One of Raat's most formidable adversaries is the 17-year-old Lohmann, whose quick-thinking allows him to escape punishment and enrage his teacher. Raat discovers a poem in the student's notebook addressed to "Fräulein Rosa Fröhlich", whom he proceeds to track down. At the "Blue Angel", he finds a placard promoting the "barefoot dancer" Rosa Fröhlich. Trying to avoid his students, Raat finds himself in the dressing room of the dancer, where he commands her to stop corrupting his students and leave town immediately. In response, she offers the professor wine, and attempts to charm him.

The next morning sees a cease-fire between the students and the professor; he is afraid of being made a fool of in the classroom and they are afraid of being written up by the principal. That night, he returns to Fröhlich and calmly explains how unacceptable it is for her to accept wine, champagne, and flowers from students. She explains that she sends such things from students back, and undresses, beginning a relationship with Raat that sees him catering to her every wish: expensive restaurants, new clothing, a furnished flat, even sorting her laundry. Eventually he is fired from his position, marries her, and discovers she has a daughter. After two years, Raat is financially ruined. A friend of his wife suggests that he give "lectures", which serve as a cover for his wife to discreetly entertain men in the professor's formerly respectable home.

Lohmann re-enters Raat's life, offering to pay all of his wife's debts, but the jealous Raat tries to strangle her and makes off with Lohmann's wallet. Lohmann reports this to the police, and both Raat and his wife are arrested.

== Film adaptations ==
- 1930: Der blaue Engel. Director: Josef von Sternberg; with Emil Jannings and Marlene Dietrich
- 1959: The Blue Angel (1959). Director: Edward Dmytryk; with Curd Jürgens
- 1972: Pinjra (Marathi/Hindi). Director: V. Shantaram; with Sandhya and Shreeram Lagoo
- 1973: Anjo Loiro (Brazilian Portuguese). Director: Alfredo Sternheim; with Vera Fischer.
- 1981: Lola. Director: Rainer Werner Fassbinder
