= The Paradise Suite =

The Paradise Suite can refer to:

- The Paradise Suite (Armchair Theatre), an episode of the TV series Armchair Theatre
- The Paradise Suite (film), a 2015 Dutch film
