= Danger Woman =

1946 film directed by Lewis D. Collins

- Theatrical release poster
- Directed by: Lewis D. Collins
- Screenplay by: Josef Mischel
- Produced by: Morgan Cox
- Starring: Don Porter; Brenda Joyce; Patricia Morison; Milburn Stone; Samuel S. Hinds; Kathleen Howard
- Cinematography: Maury Gertsman
- Edited by: Russell F. Schoengarth
- Production company: Universal Pictures
- Distributed by: Universal Pictures
- Release date: July 12, 1946
- Running time: 59 minutes
- Country: United States
- Language: English

Danger Woman is a 1946 American crime film directed by Lewis D. Collins and written by Josef Mischel. The film stars Don Porter, Brenda Joyce, Patricia Morison, Milburn Stone, Samuel S. Hinds and Kathleen Howard. It was released on July 12, 1946, by Universal Pictures.

== Cast ==
- Don Porter as Claude Ruppert
- Brenda Joyce as June Spenser
- Patricia Morison as Eve Ruppert
- Milburn Stone as Gerald King
- Samuel S. Hinds as Dr. Albert Sears
- Kathleen Howard as Eddie
- Griff Barnett as Dr. George Carey
- Charles D. Brown as Inspector Pepper
- Ted Hecht as Lane
- Leonard East as Howard
