= Mystery Sea Raider =

1940 film

- Film poster
- Directed by: Edward Dmytryk
- Screenplay by: Edward E. Paramore Jr.
- Story by: Robert Grant
- Produced by: Eugene J. Zukor
- Starring: Carole Landis; Henry Wilcoxon; Onslow Stevens
- Cinematography: Harry Fischbeck
- Edited by: Archie Marshek
- Production company: Paramount Pictures
- Distributed by: Paramount Pictures
- Release date: August 9, 1940
- Running time: 76 minutes
- Country: United States
- Language: English

Mystery Sea Raider is a 1940 American drama war film directed by Edward Dmytryk and starring Carole Landis, Henry Wilcoxon and Onslow Stevens.

== Plot ==
A woman (Carole Landis) and a U.S. captain (Henry Wilcoxon) foil a German spy's (Onslow Stevens) plan to use their freighter to sink a British ship.

== Cast ==
- Carole Landis as June McCarthy
- Henry Wilcoxon as Captain Jimmy Madden
- Onslow Stevens as Carl Cutler
- Kathleen Howard as Maggie Clancy
- Wally Rairden as Blake, 3rd Mate (as Wallace Rairdon)
- Sven Hugo Borg as Sven
- Henry Victor as Cmdr. Bulow
- Roland Varno as Lt. Schmidt
- Louis Adlon as Lerner
- Willy Kaufman as Lt. Felder
- Monte Blue as Captain Norberg
- Matthew Boulton as Captain Howard
- Gohr Van Vleck as Captain Van Wyck
- Jean Del Val as Captain Benoit
- Kay Linaker as Flossie La Mare
- Reed Howes as Hughes, Carl's Chauffeur
- Phil Warren as Sparks, Radio Operator (as Philip Wareen)
