= Sweetheart of the Campus =

1941 film

- Directed by: Edward Dmytryk
- Written by: Robert Hardy Andrews
- Screenplay by: Edmund L. Hartmann
- Produced by: Jack Fier
- Starring: Ruby Keeler; Ozzie Nelson; Harriet Hilliard
- Cinematography: Franz Planer
- Edited by: William A. Lyon
- Music by: Morris Stoloff
- Production company: Columbia Pictures
- Distributed by: Columbia Pictures
- Release date: June 26, 1941
- Running time: 70 minutes
- Country: United States
- Language: English

Sweetheart of the Campus is a 1941 American musical comedy film directed by Edward Dmytryk and starring Ruby Keeler, Ozzie Nelson and Harriet Hilliard. It was produced and distributed by Columbia Pictures. The film's working title was Betty Co-ed and it was also released as Broadway Ahead.

== Plot ==
Betty Blake is a lead vocalist for Ozzie Norton's orchestra. Vowing to prevent a hostile takeover of a college by puritanical trustee Minnie Sparr, Betty, Ozzie and his entire band enroll as college students.

== Cast ==
- Ruby Keeler as Betty Blake
- Ozzie Nelson as Ozzie Norton
- Harriet Hilliard as Harriet Hale
- Gordon Oliver as Terry Jones
- Don Beddoe as Sheriff Denby
- Charles Judels as Tomasso/Victor Demond
- Kathleen Howard as Mrs. Minnie Sparr
- Byron Foulger as Dr. Bailey
- George Lessey as Dr. Hale
- Frank Gaby as Dr. Grimsby
- Leo Watson as Tom Tom
- Four Spirits of Rhythm as Tom Tom's accompanists

== Bibliography ==
- Fetrow, Alan G. Feature Films, 1940-1949: a United States Filmography. McFarland, 1994.
