= Heinrich Mann =

German-American socialist writer and anti-fascist activist (1871–1950)

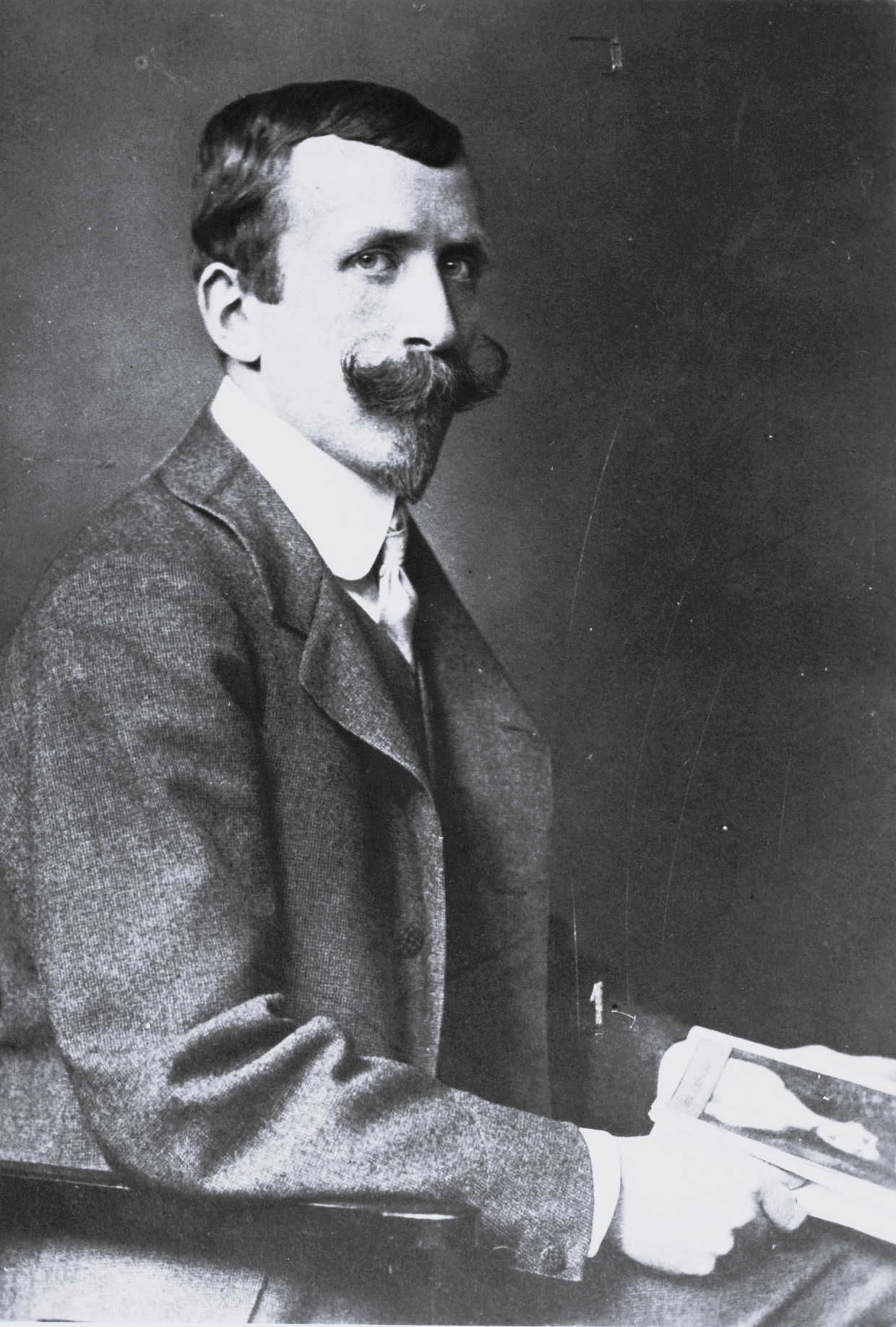
- Heinrich Mann in his "Munich years" (1894–1899)
- Born: Luiz Heinrich Mann; March 27, 1871; Free City of Lübeck, German Empire
- Died: March 11, 1950 (aged 78); Santa Monica, California, US
- Occupations: Novelist, essayist
- Relatives: Thomas Johann Heinrich Mann (father); Júlia da Silva Bruhns (mother); Thomas Mann (brother)
- Writing career
- Notable works: Der Untertan; Professor Unrat

Luiz Heinrich Mann (German: [ˈhaɪnʁɪç ˈman]; March 27, 1871 – March 11, 1950), best known as simply Heinrich Mann, was a German-American writer known for his sociopolitical novels. From 1930 until 1933, he was president of the fine poetry division of the Prussian Academy of Arts. His fierce criticism of the growing Fascism and Nazism forced him to flee Germany after the Nazis came to power during 1933. He was the elder brother of writer Thomas Mann.

== Early life ==
Born in Lübeck, as the first child of Senator Thomas Johann Heinrich Mann, grain merchant and finance minister of the Free City of Lübeck, a state of the German Empire, and Júlia da Silva Bruhns. He was the elder brother of the writer Thomas Mann with whom he had a lifelong rivalry. The Mann family was an affluent family of grain merchants of the Hanseatic city of Lübeck. After the death of his father, his mother relocated the family to Munich, where Heinrich began his career as a freier Schriftsteller (free writer). In 1914, he married a Czech actress, Maria "Mimi" Kanova. They divorced in 1930. Mimi, being Jewish, died from the consequences of a five-year detention in the concentration camp Theresienstadt.

== Work and exile ==
Mann's essay on Émile Zola and the novel Der Untertan (published over the years 1912–1918) earned him much respect during the Weimar Republic in left-wing circles, since they demonstrated the author's antiwar and defeatist stance during World War I, while the latter satirized Imperial German society; both the novel and the essay became a major impulse for Thomas Mann to write Reflections of a Nonpolitical Man, a work supporting the efforts of the German Empire in the war and condemning Heinrich as one of "Civilisation's Literary Men" (Zivilisationsliteraten), the writers who served the West in its struggle against German culture; later Thomas called the novel an example of "national slander" and "ruthless aestheticism", yet the novel had admirers such as Kurt Tucholsky. During the revolution, Heinrich became a major supporter of Kurt Eisner, a social democrat revolutionary who proclaimed Bavaria a Socialist republic; after Eisner's assassination by a far-right activist, Mann spoke at Eisner's funeral.

Later, in 1930, his book Professor Unrat was freely adapted into the movie Der Blaue Engel (The Blue Angel). Carl Zuckmayer wrote the script, and Josef von Sternberg was the director. Mann wanted his paramour, the actress Trude Hesterberg, to play the main female part as the "actress" Lola Lola (named Rosa Fröhlich in the novel), but Marlene Dietrich was given the part, her first sound role. The film helped her achieve her breakthrough, including in Hollywood, and became an icon movie in film history.

Together with Albert Einstein and other celebrities during 1932, Mann was a signatory to the "Urgent Call for Unity", asking voters to reject the Nazis. Einstein and Mann had previously co-authored a letter during 1931 condemning the murder of Croatian scholar Milan Šufflay.

Mann became persona non grata in Nazi Germany and left before the Reichstag fire of 1933. He went to France where he lived in Paris and Nice. During the German occupation of France, he made his way to Marseille, from where Varian Fry helped him escape to Spain in September 1940. Assisted by Justus Rosenberg, Mann and his wife Nelly Kröger, nephew Golo Mann, and friends Alma Mahler-Werfel and Franz Werfel hiked for six hours, finally crossing the border at Port Bou. After arriving in Portugal, the group stayed in Monte Estoril at the Grande Hotel D'Itália between September 18 and October 4, 1940. On October 4, 1940, they boarded the S.S. Nea Hellas, headed for New York City.

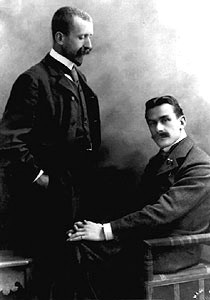
Heinrich Mann with his brother Thomas Mann, 1902

He then lived poor and sickly in Los Angeles, supported by his brother Thomas, who lived in Pacific Palisades (Thomas Mann House). The relationship between the two brothers was always difficult, because Thomas was more successful, had received the 1929 Nobel Prize in Literature and had a rich wife, and the brothers differed politically. Heinrich styled himself as a socialist revolutionary; Thomas, perhaps precisely because of this, at least in his younger years, adopted a conservative image. They also had little appreciation for each other's very different writing styles and topics. While Heinrich was considered a womanizer and philanderer who preferred lower-class women, Thomas valued respectability and looked down on his brother's constant string of mistresses and prostitutes whom Heinrich described quite openly in some of his novels and short stories. Thomas instead was fascinated by young men. For example, in 1911, Heinrich had accompanied his brother and sister-in-law to Venice, where they stayed at the Grand Hôtel des Bains on the Venice Lido. There he witnessed Thomas' obsession with a handsome Polish boy, Władysław (Władzio) Moes. Thomas processed his experience in the novella Death in Venice (1912).

The Nazis burnt Heinrich Mann's books as "contrary to the German spirit" during the infamous book burning of May 10, 1933, which was instigated by the then-Nazi propaganda minister Joseph Goebbels.

== Later life ==
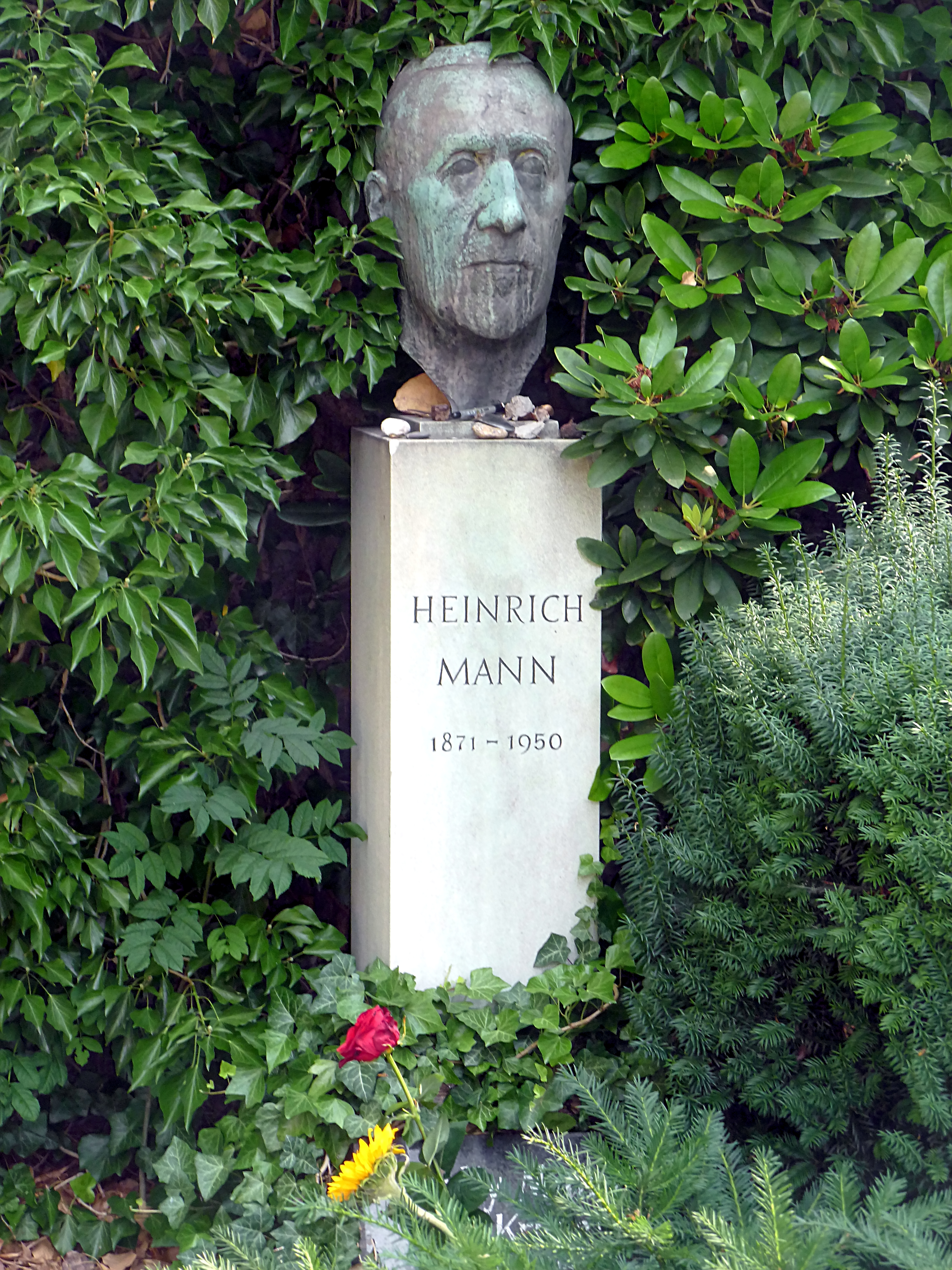
Mann's grave in Berlin

During the 1930s and later in American exile, Mann's literary popularity waned. Nevertheless, he wrote Die Jugend des Königs Henri Quatre and Die Vollendung des Königs Henri Quatre about the French King Henry IV as part of the Exilliteratur. The two novels describe the life and importance of the highly controversial and womanizing yet successful king who was ultimately murdered. This work was acclaimed by his brother Thomas Mann, who spoke of the "great splendour and dynamic art" of the work. The plot, based on Europe's early modern history from a French perspective, anticipated the end of French–German enmity, similar to how the king had tried to end the French Wars of Religion.

His second wife, Nelly Mann (1898–1944), died by suicide in Los Angeles.

Heinrich Mann died on March 11, 1950, sixteen days before his 79th birthday, in Santa Monica, California, lonely and without much money, just months before he was to relocate to East Berlin to become president of the East German Academy of Arts. His ashes were later taken to East Germany and were interred at the Dorotheenstadt Cemetery in a grave of honor.

== Popular culture ==
Mann was portrayed by Alec Guinness in the television adaptation of Christopher Hampton's play Tales from Hollywood (1992).

In Die Manns – Ein Jahrhundertroman (2001) he was played by Jürgen Hentsch.

== Bibliography ==
Fiction

- Im Schlaraffenland (In the Land of Cockaigne) (1900)
- Die Göttinnen, oder Die drei Romane der Herzogin von Assy (The Goddesses) (1903)
- Die Jagd nach Liebe (The Hunt for Love) (1903)
- Flöten und Dolche (Flutes and Daggers) (1905)
- Professor Unrat (Small Town Tyrant) (1905)
- Zwischen den Rassen (Between the Races) (1907)
- Die kleine Stadt (The Little Town) (1909)
- Die Tote und andere Novellen (The Dead Lady) (1910)
- Mnais und Ginevra (1910)
- Die Armen (The Poor) (1917)
- Der Untertan (The Patrioteer) (1918)
- Der Kopf (The Chief) (1925)
- Der Vater (The Father) (1921)
- Eugénie oder Die Bürgerzeit (Eugénie, or the Times of the Bourgeoisie) (1928)
- Ein ernstes Leben (literally A Serious Life [but published in English as 'The Hill of Lies') (1932)
- Die Jugend des Königs Henri Quatre (Young Henry of Navarre) (1935)
- Die Vollendung des Königs Henri Quatre (Henry, King of France) (1938)

Essays, Drama, and Non-Fiction

- Geist und Tat (Spirit and Deed) (1910-1918)
- Macht und Mensch (Power and Man) (1919)
- Diktatur der Vernunft (Dictatorship of Reason) (1923)
- Ein Zeitalter wird besichtigt (Review of an Age - Autobiography) (1945)
- Die traurige Geschichte von Friedrich dem Grossen (published posthumously, 1956)

== Film adaptations of his works ==
- The Blue Angel, directed by Josef von Sternberg (Germany, 1930, based on the novel Professor Unrat)
- Der Untertan, directed by Wolfgang Staudte (East Germany, 1951, based on the novel Der Untertan)
- The Blue Angel, directed by Edward Dmytryk (USA, 1959, based on the novel Professor Unrat)
- Madame Legros, directed by Michael Kehlmann (West Germany, 1968, TV film, based on the play Madame Legros)
- Man of Straw, directed by Herbert Wise (UK, 1972, TV miniseries, based on the novel Der Untertan)
- Im Schlaraffenland, directed by Kurt Jung-Alsen (East Germany, 1975, TV film, based on the novel Im Schlaraffenland)
- Belcanto oder Darf eine Nutte schluchzen?, directed by Robert van Ackeren (West Germany, 1977, based on the novel Empfang bei der Welt)
- Die Verführbaren, directed by Helmut Schiemann (East Germany, 1977, TV film, based on the novel Ein ernstes Leben)
- Le Roi qui vient du sud, directed by Marcel Camus and Heinz Schirk (France, 1979, TV miniseries, based on the novel Die Jugend des Königs Henri Quatre)
- In the Land of Cockaigne, directed by Fritz Umgelter (West Germany, 1981, TV film, based on the novel Im Schlaraffenland)
- Suturp – Eine Liebesgeschichte, directed by Gerd Keil (East Germany, 1981, TV film, based on the short story Suturp)
- Die traurige Geschichte von Friedrich dem Großen, directed by Alexander Lang (East Germany, 1983, TV film, based on the unfinished Die traurige Geschichte von Friedrich dem Großen)
- Varieté, directed by Martin Eckermann (East Germany, 1985, TV film, based on the play Varieté)
- Endstation Harembar, directed by Rainer Wolffhardt (Germany, 1992, TV film, based on the novel Ein ernstes Leben)
- Henri 4, directed by Jo Baier (Germany, 2010, based on the novels Die Jugend des Königs Henri Quatre and Die Vollendung des Königs Henri Quatre)

== See also ==
- Exilliteratur
- Dohm-Mann family tree
- Urgent Call for Unity
