= The Blue Angel (1959 film) =

1959 film

- Film poster
- Directed by: Edward Dmytryk
- Written by: Nigel Balchin
- Based on: The Blue Angel by Carl Zuckmayer Karl Vollmöller Robert Liebmann Josef von Sternberg; Professor Unrat by Heinrich Mann
- Produced by: Jack Cummings
- Starring: Curd Jürgens; May Britt; Theodore Bikel
- Cinematography: Leon Shamroy
- Edited by: Jack W. Holmes
- Music by: Hugo Friedhofer
- Distributed by: 20th Century-Fox
- Release date: September 4, 1959 (New York)
- Running time: 107 minutes
- Country: United States
- Language: English
- Budget: $1.7 million
- Box office: $1.4 million (est. US/ Canada rentals)

The Blue Angel is a 1959 American drama film in CinemaScope directed by Edward Dmytryk and starring Curd Jürgens, May Britt, and Theodore Bikel. The film is a remake of Josef von Sternberg's 1930 film The Blue Angel which featured Marlene Dietrich playing cabaret singer Lola-Lola and Emil Jannings as the troubled, aged Professor Rath, who falls for her, much to his own detriment. Both films were based on Heinrich Mann's 1905 novel Professor Unrat.

== Plot ==
Professor Immanuel Rath is shocked to discover a number of his students have been frequenting a nightspot called the Blue Angel, where a scandalous entertainer named Lola performs. Rath attends the show one night to catch some of his boys in this den of wickedness, but he is soon drawn into Lola's sensual spell, and in time becomes involved in an obsessive romance with her that costs him his job, his savings, and his dignity.

== Cast ==
- Curd Jürgens as Professor Immanuel Rath (as Curt Jurgens)
- May Britt as Lola-Lola
- Theodore Bikel as Klepert
- John Banner as Principal Harter
- Fabrizio Mioni as Rolf
- Ludwig Stössel as Dr. Fritz Heine

== Background ==
In 1955, 20th Century-Fox acquired the rights to remake the original film as a possible vehicle for Marilyn Monroe and Spencer Tracy, but both turned it down. Other actors reportedly considered for the film were Fredric March as Professor Rath and Lou Jacobi as Klepert.

== Reception ==
=== Critical ===
Reviews were mixed to negative. Bosley Crowther of The New York Times panned the film as "ponderous", finding a "zombie-like quality" in Curd Jürgens' acting and describing the restraint placed upon May Britt as "difficult to fathom ... she looks and behaves like a normal ballet dancer in a Broadway musical show, not like a slinky sex-pot in a smoky night club in Berlin." Harrison's Reports disagreed and called Jürgens' performance "powerful", further opining that Britt "emerges as a gaminesque sprite with many of the qualities that brought fame to Shirley MacLaine." Variety wrote, "As a box-office commodity 'The Blue Angel' will be a fair entry. It will not be the rocker that the Jannings-Dietrich impact made, and, while suffering inevitable comparison, neither Jurgens nor Miss Britt need be ashamed of their performances." Richard L. Coe of The Washington Post praised Jürgens for a "wholly engrossing performance", but called it "too bad" that the remake was "a soft, charmingly hued pastel that twins with Soap Opera." The Monthly Film Bulletin wrote, "one need have no knowledge of the original to find the new version slow and lifeless. It totally lacks the stifling atmosphere of sordid and obsessive sexuality which is essential to give conviction to the German sadism of the story." The Guardian thought the new, happier ending of the remake was "a monstrosity" and found May Britt "a demure and vapid siren" when compared to Marlene Dietrich, adding, "The best that can be said for this travesty is that it may encourage someone to show the first version again."

=== Box office ===
Variety called the film a "disaster" at the box office.

== Lawsuit ==
The director of the original 1930 film, Josef von Sternberg, sued Fox for $1 million, claiming that he owned the rights to a remake and that Fox had made a film "so inferior that it decreased the value of the original." The case was settled out of court.
