= Kathleen Howard =

American actress

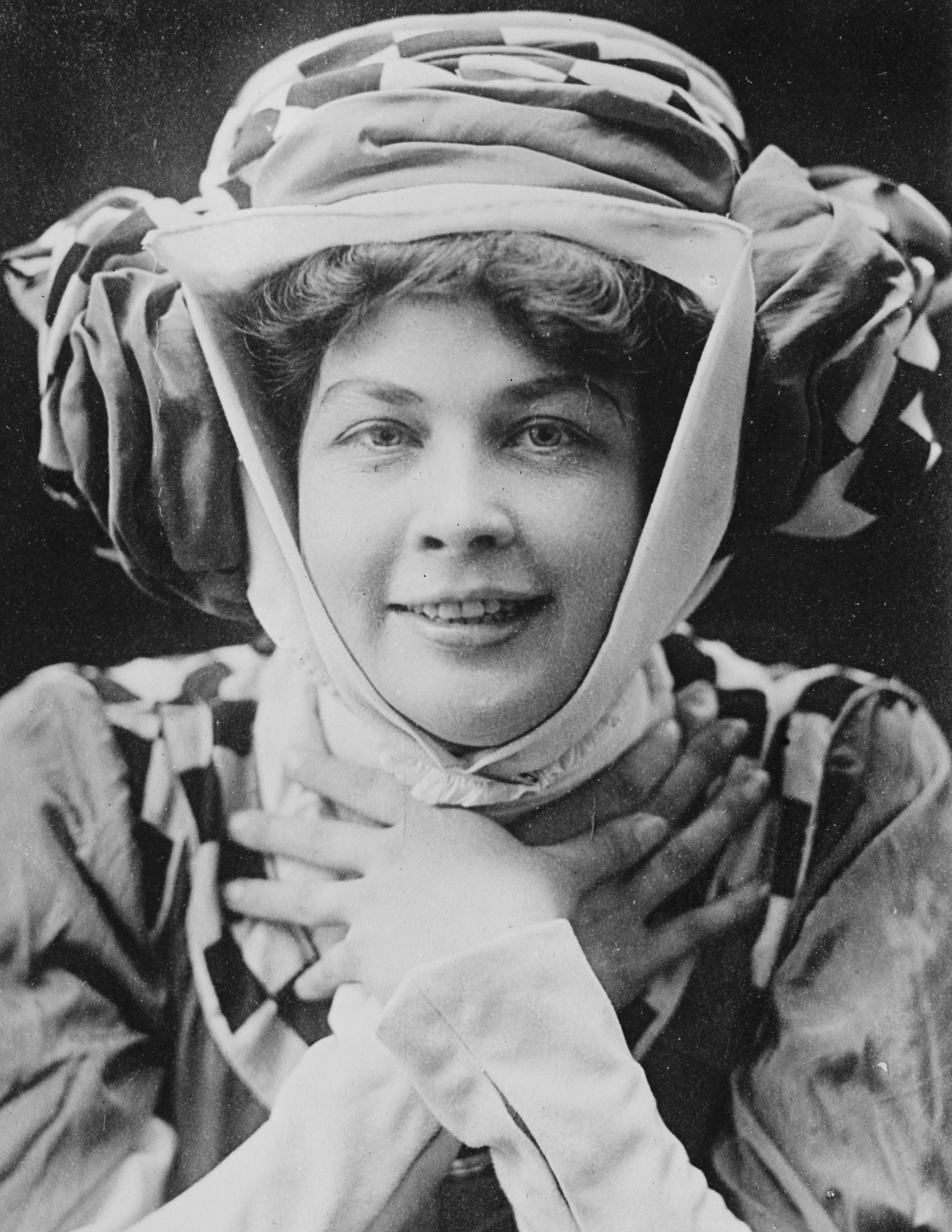
- Born: July 27, 1884; Clifton Hill, Ontario, Canada
- Died: April 15, 1956 (aged 71); Hollywood, Los Angeles, California, U.S.
- Occupations: Opera singer, actress, magazine editor
- Years active: 1934–1951

Kathleen Howard (July 27, 1884 – April 15, 1956) was a Canadian-born American opera singer, magazine editor, and character actress from the mid-1930s through the 1940s.

== Biography ==
Howard was born in Clifton Hill, Niagara Falls, Ontario, Canada on July 27, 1884.

In 1906, Howard began her career in opera in Germany. Following eight years of singing in Berlin, she performed concerts in Belgium, England, Germany, Holland, and Scandinavia. She arrived in America in 1913 and joined the Metropolitan Opera in 1916. She remained a leading Met artist through 1928, taking major and secondary roles.

Howard created the role of Zita in Giacomo Puccini's Gianni Schicchi at the Metropolitan Opera in 1918. Until World War I, Howard was part of the repertory system in the opera houses of Metz and Darmstadt.

Beginning in 1918, for four years, Howard was the fashion editor of Harper's Bazaar magazine and while in that post was also president of Fashion Group International. She resigned to begin acting in films.

Her film debut came in Death Takes a Holiday (1934). She played Amelia, the nagging, shrewish wife of W.C. Fields in It's a Gift (1934), and appeared in two other Fields films: You're Telling Me! (1934) and Man on the Flying Trapeze (1935).

Howard died on April 15, 1956, aged 71, in Hollywood, California after a long illness. She was buried in Forest Lawn Cemetery in Buffalo, New York.

== Legacy ==
Howard did not make as many opera recordings during the acoustical era as did her contemporaries Geraldine Farrar and Mary Garden, and thus was not as well known. Her few recordings were vertical-cut discs for Edison Records, playable only on Edison Disc Phonographs; and for the American branch of Pathé Frères in 1918, which received limited distribution. Among them are Harry Burleigh's arrangement of the spiritual "Deep River", arias from Charles Gounod's Faust and Giuseppe Verdi's Il Trovatore (in English), and the "Barcarolle" from Jacques Offenbach's Les contes d'Hoffmann with Claudia Muzio (in French).

== Filmography ==
Film
| Year | Title | Role | Notes |
|---|---|---|---|
| 1934 | Death Takes a Holiday | Princess Maria | |
| 1934 | You're Telling Me! | Mrs. Edward Quimby Murchison | |
| 1934 | One More River | Lady Charwell | |
| 1934 | Once to Every Bachelor | Aunt Henrietta | |
| 1934 | Lady by Choice | Mrs. Mills | |
| 1934 | It's a Gift | Mrs. Amelia Bissonette | Starring W.C. Fields |
| 1935 | Man on the Flying Trapeze | Leona Wolfinger | Alternative title: The Memory Expert |
| 1937 | Stolen Holiday | Madame Delphine | |
| 1937 | The Hit Parade | Mrs. Barrett | Uncredited |
| 1938 | When G-Men Step In | Mrs. Drake | Uncredited |
| 1938 | Letter of Introduction | Aunt Jonnie in Play | Uncredited |
| 1938 | Crime Takes a Holiday | Mrs. Allen, Governor's Wife | Uncredited |
| 1939 | Three Smart Girls Grow Up | Mrs. Kittenhaven | Uncredited |
| 1939 | Rio | Mme. Adrienne Lamartine | Uncredited |
| 1939 | Little Accident | Mrs. Allerton | |
| 1939 | First Love | Miss Wiggins | |
| 1940 | Outside the Three-Mile Limit | Socialite | Uncredited |
| 1940 | Mystery Sea Raider | Maggie Clancy | |
| 1940 | Young People | Hester Appleby | |
| 1940 | Five Little Peppers in Trouble | Mrs. Wilcox | |
| 1940 | One Night in the Tropics | Judge McCracken | Uncredited |
| 1941 | A Girl, a Guy and a Gob | Jawme Duncan | |
| 1941 | Sweetheart of the Campus | Mrs. Minnie Lambeth Sparr | |
| 1941 | Blossoms in the Dust | Mrs. Sarah Keats | |
| 1941 | Miss Polly | Mrs. Minerva Snodgrass | |
| 1941 | Ball of Fire | Miss Bragg | Alternative title: The Professor and the Burlesque Queen |
| 1942 | Take a Letter, Darling | Aunt Minnie | Alternative title: Green-Eyed Woman |
| 1942 | The Mad Martindales | Grandmother Varney | |
| 1942 | Lady in a Jam | Woman | Uncredited |
| 1942 | The Magnificent Dope | Tad's Mother, Mrs. Page | Uncredited |
| 1942 | You Were Never Lovelier | Grandmother Acuña | Uncredited |
| 1943 | Crash Dive | Miss Bromley | Uncredited |
| 1943 | My Kingdom for a Cook | Mrs. Theodore Carter | Uncredited |
| 1943 | Swing Out the Blues | Aunt Amanda | |
| 1944 | Reckless Age | Sarah Wadsworth | |
| 1944 | Laura | Louise, Ann's Cook | Uncredited |
| 1945 | Eadie Was a Lady | Aunt Priscilla | |
| 1945 | Shady Lady | Butch | |
| 1945 | Snafu | Dean Garrett | |
| 1946 | Miss Susie Slagle's | Miss Wingate | Uncredited |
| 1946 | Mysterious Intruder | Rose Denning | |
| 1946 | Centennial Summer | Deborah | |
| 1946 | Danger Woman | Eddie | |
| 1947 | Cross My Heart | Mrs. Klute | Uncredited |
| 1947 | The Late George Apley | Margaret, the Maid | Uncredited |
| 1947 | Cynthia | McQuillan | |
| 1947 | The Hal Roach Comedy Carnival | Aunt Martha, in 'Curly' | |
| 1948 | The Bride Goes Wild | Aunt Susan | |
| 1948 | Cry of the City | Miss Pruett's Mother | Uncredited |
| 1950 | The Petty Girl | Prof. Langton | Uncredited |
| 1950 | Born to Be Bad | Mrs. Bolton | |

Television
| Year | Title | Role | Notes |
|---|---|---|---|
| 1951 | The Bigelow Theatre | | 1 episode |
