= Júlia da Silva Bruhns =

Brazilian woman (1851–1923)

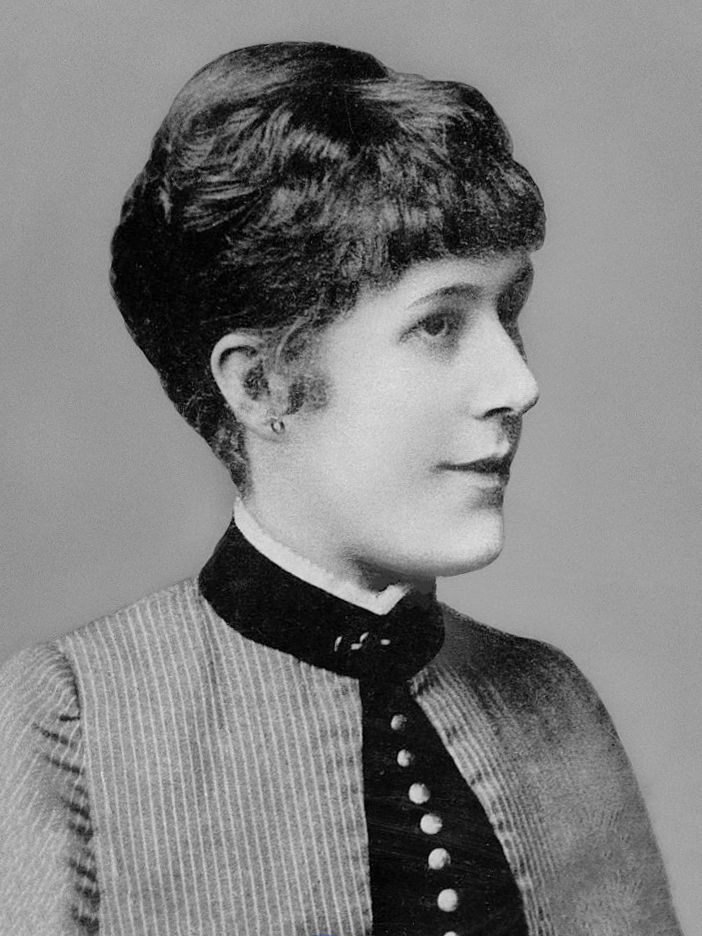
- da Silva Bruhns in 1885
- Born: 14 August 1851; Paraty, Rio de Janeiro, Brazil
- Died: 11 March 1923 (aged 71); Weßling, Bavaria, Germany
- Spouse: Thomas Johann Heinrich Mann (m. 1869; died 1891)
- Children: 5, including Heinrich and Thomas
- Relatives: Dohm–Mann family tree

Júlia da Silva Bruhns (14 August 1851, Paraty – 11 March 1923, Weßling) was the Brazilian mother of Thomas and Heinrich Mann and one of the matriarchs of the Mann family.

== Biography ==
Da Silva Bruhns was born in Paraty, Rio de Janeiro state on Boa Vista sugar plantation. Raised Roman Catholic, she was the daughter of a Lübecker farmer Johann Ludwig Herman Bruhns and his wife Maria Luísa da Silva, herself the daughter of a Portuguese immigrant and landowner and his wife, who was of Criollo descent. Johann had emigrated from Lübeck to Brazil at age 16 and changed his name to João Luis Germano Bruhns. He owned several sugar cane plantations between Santos and Rio de Janeiro. Maria died at age 28 in childbirth when da Silva Bruhns was six.

The following year, she, her father, and her four siblings moved to Lübeck, where da Silva Bruhns and her sister, neither of whom spoke German, lived in a boarding house for girls. Their father, meanwhile, returned to Brazil to care for the farms. In Germany, she was forbidden from speaking Portuguese. When she turned 14, da Silva Bruhns moved into her uncle's house. On 4 June 1869, when she was 17, she was married to 29-year-old senator and grain merchant Thomas Johann Heinrich Mann, a man from a wealthy hanseaten family. They had five children: Luiz Heinrich, Paulo Thomas, Julia Elisabeth Therese "Lula", Carla Augusta Olga Maria, and Karl Viktor. Her husband died in 1891 due to complications from bladder surgery and his business was liquidated. After his death, da Silva Bruhns moved with her younger children to Munich. In 1903, she wrote a memoir about her idyllic childhood in Brazil. It was published posthumously in 1958 under the name Aus Dodos Kindheit—"From Dodô's childhood", in reference to her childhood nickname.

In 1910, da Silva Bruhns' daughter Carla, an actress, died by suicide from cyanide poisoning while visiting her mother in Bavaria. In her final years, da Silva Bruhns moved frequently and lived mostly in hotels. On 11 March 1923, da Silva Bruhns died in a hotel room in Weßling with her three sons at her side. Despite her prolonged experience with xenophobia in Germany and her longing to return to South America, she was never able to return to Brazil. Three years after da Silva Bruhns' death, her other daughter, Lula, a morphine addict, died by suicide from hanging in Munich.

== Literary impact ==
In recent years, particularly as the Mann brothers' Brazilian ancestry has been uncovered, it has become clear just how much da Silva Bruhns inspired and influenced the work of her sons Thomas and Heinrich. Both created characters inspired by her in several of their books, referring to her South American blood and passionate artistic temperament. In Buddenbrooks she was the inspiration for Gerda Arnoldsen and Toni Buddenbrook. In Doktor Faustus, she became the wife of Senator Rodde. In Tonio Kröger, she was the mother, Consuelo. In Death in Venice, she appears as the mother of the protagonist, Gustav von Aschenbach. Her memoir inspired Heinrich to write Zwischen den Rassen, whose main character is a fictionalized version of her.

Among the biographies about her are Dagmar Von Gersdorff's Julia Mann, the Mother of Heinrich and Thomas Mann – A Biography (2019), O retorno de Júlia Mann a Paraty by Teolinda Gersão (2021); and Julia de Paraty by Fabia Terni Leipziger (2024).

== See also ==
- Dohm–Mann family tree
