= Golden Gloves (1940 film) =

1940 film

- Film poster
- Directed by: Edward Dmytryk; Felix E. Feist
- Written by: Joe Ansen; Lewis R. Foster; Maxwell Shane
- Produced by: Carl Krueger; William LeBaron
- Starring: Richard Denning
- Cinematography: Henry Sharp
- Edited by: Doane Harrison
- Distributed by: Paramount Pictures
- Release date: August 2, 1940
- Running time: 66 minutes
- Country: United States
- Language: English

Golden Gloves is a 1940 American crime film directed by Edward Dmytryk.

== Plot ==
During an amateur boxing prizefight a young boy, Joey Parker, is beaten to death, and there is no acceptable official reason for why it happened. Because of this his sister, Mary Parker, becomes a strong opponent of boxing and all it stands for.

A newspaper refuses to print the truth of what lies behind the Parker boy's tragic death, so sportswriter Wally Matson resigns in protest. The truth is that Parker was only one of many boys unscrupulously used by a boxing promoter, Joe Taggerty, who has paid off Wally's editor at the newspaper for his silence.

Wally vows to clean up the amateur boxing scene by exposing the corruption. He lands a job at a small newspaper and persuades the publisher to sponsor a legitimate tournament.

Wally personally invites amateur Billy Crane to participate in the tournament's opening match. Billy is in love with Parker's sister Mary, so out of consideration for her, he declines. To get Billy to fight, Wally needs to win over Mary, so he takes her out for dinner. He tells her about his tough childhood and how boxing gave hope to friends as a way of securing their futures. Billy gets her permission to enter the tournament.

Taggerty is not happy, believing this new tournament started by Wally will ultimately put him out of business. Taggerty lies by telling Billy that Wally only is after his beloved Mary, and that the two of them already have been on a date. Billy is devastated.

Taggerty goes even further to sabotage the tournament. He pays a professional boxer, Cliff Stanton, to enter it posing as an amateur. Taggerty's plan is spoiled when Billy is set to fight against Stanton. Inspired by Mary's vow of everlasting love for him, he beats Stanton fair and square in the fight. Taggerty's deceit is exposed, and the Golden Gloves amateur tournament wins national acclaim.

== Cast ==
- Richard Denning as Bill Crane
- Jeanne Cagney as Mary Parker
- J. Carrol Naish as Joe Taggerty
- Robert Paige as Wally Matson
- William Frawley as Emory Balzar
- Edward Brophy as Potsy Brill
- Robert Ryan as Pete Wells
- George Ernest as Joey Parker
- David Durand as Gumdrop Wilbur
- James Seay as Jimmy
- Sidney Miller as Sammy Sachs
- Alec Craig as Editor MacDonald

== See also ==
- List of boxing films
