= Blood and Honor: Youth Under Hitler =

- Written by: Robert Muller
- Directed by: Bernd Fischerauer
- Starring: Jeffrey Frank, Rolf Becker, Marlies Engel, Leslie Malton, Steffen Rubling
- Countries of origin: United States, West Germany
- Original languages: English, German
- No. of episodes: 2 (4 in West Germany)

Production
- Producer: Daniel Wilson
- Running time: 232 mins
- Budget: $4,000,000

Original release
- Release: 1982

Blood and Honor: Youth Under Hitler, 1982 (aka Blut und Ehre – Jugend unter Hitler) is a German/American made for TV mini-series which was a co-production between Daniel Wilson Productions and S.W.F (Südwestfunk) and Taurus-Film GmbH.

The original screenplay was by Helmut Kissel and was partly based on his own experience as a member of the Hitler Youth. The scripts that were eventually shot, however, were written by Robert Muller. Helmut Kissel led as the director of the project but was replaced by Bernd Fischerauer within the first couple of weeks when shooting started. The shooting was on location in Baden-Baden, West Germany with the first 4 weeks in August 1980 and the rest of the production was completed between January through March in 1981.

Each scene was shot both in English and in German and resulted in two versions of the film. The post production of the German version was completed in spring of 1982. It premiered on West German TV in July 1982 and was watched by more than 50% of the available audience. The American version premiered in November 1982 on various independent television stations in the United States (KBHK-44, WPIX-TV, etc.). Blood and Honor: Youth Under Hitler also received a Peabody Award in 1982 and was shown in 7 countries, including the Netherlands, UK, Austria, and Israel.
