= Emergency Squad (1940 film) =

1940 American adventure film

- Film poster
- Directed by: Edward Dmytryk
- Written by: Robert Musil; Michael Raymond
- Produced by: William LeBaron; Stuart Walker
- Starring: William Henry
- Cinematography: Stuart Thompson
- Edited by: Everett Douglas
- Production company: Paramount Pictures
- Distributed by: Paramount Pictures
- Release date: January 5, 1940
- Running time: 58 minutes
- Country: United States
- Language: English

Emergency Squad is a 1940 American adventure film directed by Edward Dmytryk.

== Cast ==
- William Henry as Peter Barton
- Louise Campbell as Betty Bryant
- Richard Denning as Dan Barton
- Robert Paige as Chester 'Chesty' Miller
- Anthony Quinn as Nick Buller
- John Miljan as Slade Wiley
- John Marston as Lt. Murdock
- Joseph Crehan as H. Tyler Joyce, editor
- Barbara Barondess as Ada Miller
