= The Hawk (1935 film) =

1935 film

- Directed by: Edward Dmytryk
- Written by: James Oliver Curwood; Griffin Jay
- Produced by: H. A. Wohl
- Starring: Bruce Lane
- Cinematography: Roland Price
- Edited by: Edward Dmytryk
- Release date: May 13, 1935
- Running time: 55 minutes
- Country: United States
- Language: English

The Hawk, reissued in 1937 as The Trail of the Hawk, is a 1935 American Western film directed by Edward Dmytryk. It was Dmytryk's debut film as a director.

== Cast ==
- Bruce Lane as Jack King, a.k.a. Jay Price (as Yancey Lane)
- Betty Jordan as Betty Thomas
- Dickie Jones as Dickie Thomas
- Lafe McKee as Jim King
- Rollo Dix as Jeff Murdock aka The Hawk
- Don Orlando as Tony the Cook
- Marty Joyce as Smokey
- Eddie Foster
- Zanda the Dog as Zanda
- Ramblin' Tommy Scott as Tommy
