= Haunted (British TV series) =

British supernatural drama series

- Genre: Drama
- Written by: Anthony Skene; John Gray; Katharine Blake and Roger Woddis; Andrew Hall; Robert Muller; Marc Brandel
- Directed by: Michael Apted
- Starring: Patrick Mower
- Country of origin: United Kingdom
- Original language: English
- No. of series: 1
- No. of episodes: 8 (all missing)

Production
- Running time: 60 minutes
- Production company: ABC Weekend TV

Original release
- Network: ITV
- Release: 19 August 1967

Haunted is a British supernatural drama series broadcast by ITV (ABC). It ran for eight episodes from 1967–68 and starred Patrick Mower as University lecturer Michael West, who travelled around Britain investigating reported paranormal phenomena. The entire series was later wiped from the ITV archives. None of the episodes are known to have survived on film.

== Production ==
Patrick Mower's character of Michael West was based on a character he played in the Public Eye episode There are More Things in Heaven and Earth, broadcast in 1966, though his character there was a journalist named Tony Hart. Both Tony and Michael however shared an interest in the paranormal.

== Episode list ==
1. "I Like It Here"
2. "The Chinese Butterfly"
3. "To Blow My Name About"
4. "Many Happy Returns"
5. "After the Funeral"
6. "Living Doll"
7. "Through a Glass Darkly"
8. "The Girl on the Swing"
