= He Is My Brother =

1975 American drama film

- Theatrical release poster
- Directed by: Edward Dmytryk
- Written by: James Polakof, David Pritchard
- Produced by: James Polakof
- Starring: Bobby Sherman
- Music by: Ed Bogas
- Release date: 1975
- Running time: 90 minutes
- Country: United States
- Language: English

He Is My Brother is a 1975 American drama film directed by Edward Dmytryk.

== Plot ==
Two boys become shipwrecked on an island and find themselves locked in a struggle with lepers and colonists.

== Cast ==
- Bobby Sherman as Jeff Remington
- Kathy Paulo as Luana
- Keenan Wynn as Brother Dalton
- Robbie Rist as Randy Remington
- Joaquín Martínez as The Kahuna
- Benson Fong as Kiko

== See also ==
- List of American films of 1975
