= Emil Hammacher =

German philosopher (1885–1916)

Emil Hammacher (21 March 1885, Köln — 1916, killed in France) was a German philosopher, proponent of objective idealism and mystic, doctor of Philosophy and Law, professor of philosophy at the University of Bonn.

He studied in Geneva, Heidelberg, Berlin and Bonn. Hammacher borrowed the basic tenets of objective idealism from Hegel. He rejected dialectics and developed the mystical doctrine of "ethical self-awareness of the spirit" as "the supreme and fundamental value." In his work directed against Marxism, Hammacher holds the idea that the socialization of the means of production and materialism are contrary to the laws of morality.

== Works ==
=== Books ===
- Der Charakter der Notstandshandlung vom rechtsphilosophischen und legislativen Standpunkte. Diss. Leipzig 1907
- Die philosophischen Entwicklungsbedingungen des Marxismus, Bonn, 1908;
- Das philosophisch-ökonomische System des Marxismus, Lpz., 1909;
- Die Bedeutung der Philosophie Hegels für die Gegenwart. Lpz., 1911;
- Hauptfragen der modernen Kultur. Lpz.—B., 1914.

=== Articles ===
- Zur Würdigung des "wahren" Sozialismus. in: Archiv für die Geschichte des Sozialismus und der Arbeiterbewegung / Hrsg. Carl Grünberg. - Leipzig, 1 (1911), p. 41-100
