= Straw (cryogenic storage) =

A cryopreservation straw is a small storage device used for the cryogenic storage of liquid samples, often in a biobank or other collection of samples. Their most common application is for storage of sperm for in-vitro fertilization.

Ideally such straws should be made of a material that is chemically inert, biocompatible and have physical characteristics that make them resistant to ultra-low temperatures and pressures created by their storage conditions, resulting in the expansion of liquids and liquid nitrogen.

== Use ==
Once the sample has been introduced into the straw, both extremities are thermally sealed using a specific device, usually supplied by the manufacturer of the consumable.

The straws are then stored within triangular or square visotubes, which in turn fit into cylindrical or square containers known as goblets. These are then organized into a matrix of the same within an ultra-low temperature freezer or nitrogen tank.

== Characteristics ==
- specifically designed for storing biological materials at temperatures as low as -190 °C;
- stable when submitted to sudden low temperatures (snap freezing), when held at low temperatures for long periods of time (years ) or when taken through several freeze-thaw cycles; and
- as leak proof as possible even at the lowest cryogenic temperatures.
