= Man of Straw (TV series) =

British television series

- Genre: Drama
- Based on: Der Untertan by Heinrich Mann
- Written by: Robert Muller
- Directed by: Herbert Wise
- Starring: Derek Jacobi; John Phillips; Judy Cornwell
- Country of origin: United Kingdom
- Original language: English
- No. of series: 1
- No. of episodes: 6

Production
- Producer: Martin Lisemore
- Running time: 45 minutes
- Production company: BBC

Original release
- Network: BBC Two
- Release: 30 January – 5 March 1972

Man of Straw is a British television drama series which first aired on BBC 2 between 30 January and 5 March 1972. It is an adaptation of the 1918 novel Der Untertan (The Underling) by Heinrich Mann. It takes place during the final years of Wilhelmine Germany.

== Main cast ==
- Derek Jacobi as Diederich Hessling (6 episodes)
- John Phillips as Dr. Heuteufel (5 episodes)
- Denis Carey as Sötbier (4 episodes)
- Judy Cornwell as Guste Daimchen (4 episodes)
- Elizabeth Bell as Emmi Hessling (3 episodes)
- Sheila Brennan as Frau Hessling (3 episodes)
- Dave Hill as Napoleon Fischer (3 episodes)
- Judy Loe as Kätchen Zillich (3 episodes)
- Karin MacCarthy as Magda Hessling (3 episodes)
- Ian Ogilvy as Wolfgang Buck (3 episodes)
- John Savident as Von Wulckow (3 episodes)
- Juliet Aykroyd as Agnes Göppel (2 episodes)
- Sam Dastor as Dr. Jadassohn (2 episodes)
- Mike Fields as Virsing (2 episodes)
- Derek Francis as Herr Göppel (2 episodes)
- Harry Hutchinson as Judge Sarding (2 episodes)
- David King as Burgermeister Scheffelweis (2 episodes)
- Stanley Lebor as Herr Cohn (2 episodes)
- Stuart McGugan as Fox Major (2 episodes)
- Eve Pearce as Judith Lauer (2 episodes)
- Sean Roantree as Wiebel (2 episodes)
- Cyril Shaps as Herr Lauer (2 episodes)
- Brian Stirner as Hernung (2 episodes)
- Manning Wilson as Pastor Zillich (2 episodes)

== Bibliography ==
- Ellen Baskin. Serials on British Television, 1950-1994. Scolar Press, 1996.
