= Jack Straw (disambiguation) =

Jack Straw (born 1946) is a British politician.

Jack Straw may also refer to:

- Jack Straw (rebel leader) (died 1381), leader of the 1381 Peasants' Revolt
- "Jack Straw" (song), a 1971 song by the Grateful Dead
- The Life and Death of Jack Straw, a late 16th-century play
- Jack Straw, a 1908 play by W. Somerset Maugham
- Jack Straw (film), a 1920 silent film comedy, based on the play
- Jackstraws, the game pick-up sticks
- Jack Straw's Lane, in Oxford, England, named after a farmer called Jack Straw
- Jack Straw's Castle, Hampstead, a former pub
