= Her First Romance (1940 film) =

1940 film

- Directed by: Edward Dmytryk
- Written by: Adele Comandini; Gene Stratton-Porter
- Produced by: H. A. Wohl
- Starring: Edith Fellows; Julie Bishop; Alan Ladd
- Cinematography: John J. Mescall
- Edited by: William H. Ziegler
- Distributed by: Monogram Pictures
- Release date: December 25, 1940
- Running time: 77 minutes
- Country: United States
- Language: English

Her First Romance is a 1940 American musical comedy film directed by Edward Dmytryk. based on Gene Stratton-Porter's novel Her Father's Daughter.

== Plot ==
College student Linda Strong speaks to friend Susie about the upcoming dance lamenting her plain looks from getting her a date. On a dare, fraternity pledge Donald Whiting is forced to ask Linda to the Dance which she gleefully accepts. Once home her guardian and older half-sister, Eileen Strong, does not allow her to go even after her cook Katy has gotten excited for her. After Eileen's rejection, Katy, Linda, and her cousin, Marian Strong, conspire to get Linda a dress and shoes for the dance.

In the interim, Linda was singing in the woods of the Strong estate one day when a voice joined her in duet of a man who had been fishing on the property, not knowing her was trespassing. They finish their song, and Linda goes to meet him but falls in the water where he pulls her out. Free of her glasses, she and "Crusoe" have a picnic and talk excitedly about fishing and the like. Linda believes he would be a good match for her cousin Marian whose fiancé, John, has been stolen by Eileen. "Crusoe" drives her back home where Linda and Marian wave him off. Only then does Linda find out from Marian that "Crusoe" is the famous singer Philip Niles in town to relax, visit relatives, and attend a dance in his honor.

The night of the dance Linda is readying herself with Marian and Katy when she receives a call from Susie who has just learned of the plot to get Donald to ask Linda to the dance. Linda is heartbroken and refuses to go to the dance with him. However, her transformation means Donald actually wants to take her to the dance and doesn't take no for an answer until Linda sprays him and his fraternity brothers with the hose. As she goes off to cry, Philip shows up and offers to take her to the dance. Upon arriving few can believe it is really Linda especially on the arm of the guest of honor. They sing a duet and Linda gets attention from all the boys while Eileen shows up and sets her sights on Philip and Linda's career in singing. Eileen invites him for tea the next day "to talk about Linda's future" expressly dis-inviting Linda from the conversation.

In response Linda spreads word to some nearby old women that Philip will be at her house tomorrow for tea. As Eileen is overrun by 150 women for tea, Philip joins Marian and Linda on a picnic as Linda is still trying to play matchmaker for her cousin. There they run into John after he sends a golf ball straight into their lemon pie. That evening the character gather for dinner at the Strong's where Eileen finally gets Philip alone and discusses Linda's future while she eavesdrops. After this debacle, Marian tells Linda that she is not interested in Philip and would like Linda to pursue him.

Having no experience in the field, Linda borrows Eileen's copy of How to Get Your Man which leads her to take Philip to her family's cabin. While there she tampers with the car and hose to make it appear that they are stranded in the rain and must wait to leave and get help. Philip finds the book and decides not to confront her until Eileen pulls up and makes Linda's scheming clear. Eileen then wants to go to San Francisco with Philip to talk more about Linda's future. Fed up, Linda fixes and drives Philip's car back to warn John of his fiancée's plans with Philip. John misunderstands and believes Marian is leaving with Philip and slaps him before everything is made clear. With this outburst John also realizes that he never lost his love for Marian and proposes to her again and they are married that day. After the ceremony Philip asks Eileen for Linda's hand which she absolutely refuses. The last scene sees Philip and Linda agree to marry once she is 18 and no longer needs Marian's consent so she can join him as a famous singer and his wife.

== Cast ==
- Edith Fellows as Linda Strong
- Wilbur Evans as Philip Niles
- Julie Bishop as Eileen Strong (as Jacqueline Wells)
- Alan Ladd as John Gilman
- Judith Linden as Marian Strong
- Roger Daniel as Donald Whiting
- Marian Kirby as Katy
- Marlo Dwyer as Susie Sloan (as Marla Dwyer)
- Ottola Nesmith as Mrs. Whiting
