= The Paradise Suite (Armchair Theatre) =

- Armchair Theatre episode
- Episode no.: Season 4 Episode 70
- Directed by: Philip Saville
- Written by: Robert Muller
- Original air date: 17 February 1963

Guest appearances
- Carroll Baker; Sam Wanamaker; Ian Holm; Jess Conrad; Derek Smith

"The Paradise Suite" is an episode of the TV series Armchair Theatre, produced by ABC Weekend TV for the British ITV network. It was inspired by the death of Marilyn Monroe.

== Plot ==
Film star Lena Roland stays in the Paradise Suite and yearns for love.
