= Christopher Beha =

American writer

Christopher Beha is an American writer. He was the editor-in-chief of Harper's Magazine from October 2019 to October 2023. His third novel, The Index of Self-Destructive Acts, was long-listed for the 2020 National Book Award in Fiction.

== Early life and education ==
Beha attended the New School's Creative Writing Program in New York City and graduated in 2006.

== Career ==
Beha was the editor of Harper's Magazine from October 2019 to October 2023. He left the magazine in November 2021 for a six-month book leave.

== Personal life ==
Beha is a Catholic.

== Works ==
- The Whole Five Feet, New York : Grove Press, 2010. ISBN 9780802144850
- What Happened to Sophie Wilder, 2012 ISBN 9781935639312
- Arts & Entertainments, 2014 ISBN 9780062322463
- The Index of Self-Destructive Acts, Tin House Books, 2020, ISBN 9781947793828
- Why I Am Not an Atheist: The Confessions of a Skeptical Believer, Penguin Press, 2026 ISBN 978-0-593-49047-1
