= Der Untertan =

1918 novel by Heinrich Mann

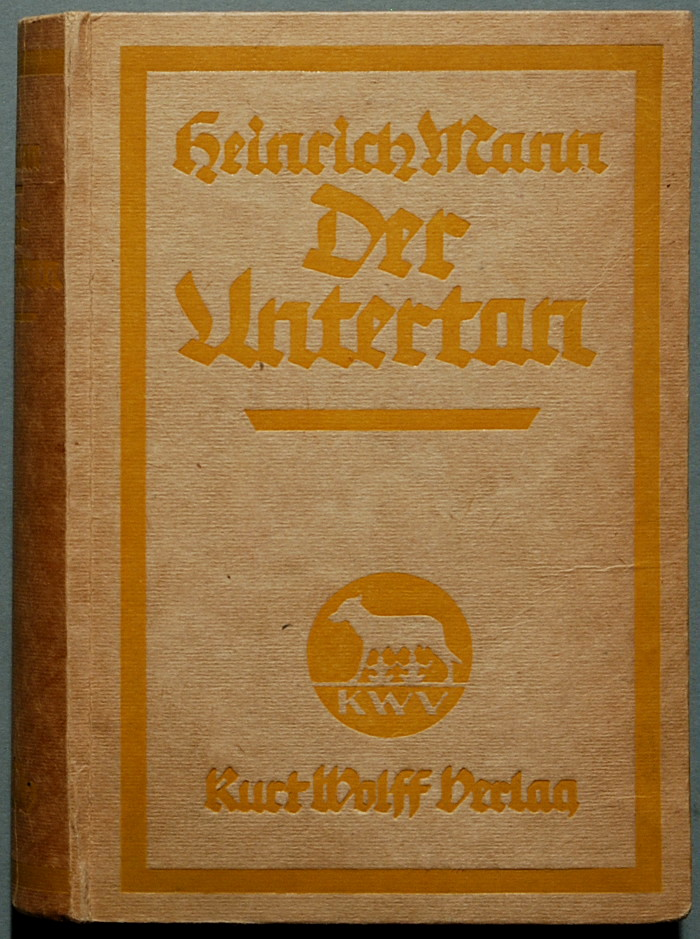
- Cover of the 1918 edition
- Author: Heinrich Mann
- Language: German
- Genre: Political novel, satirical novel, bildungsroman
- Publisher: Kurt Wolff
- Publication date: 1918
- Publication place: Germany
- Media type: Print (Hardcover & Paperback)

Der Untertan (German: [deːɐ̯ ˈʔʊntɐtaːn]; literally "the underling", translated into English under the titles Man of Straw, The Patrioteer, and The Loyal Subject) is one of the best known novels of German author Heinrich Mann. The title character, Diederich Hessling, a dedicated 'Untertan' in the sense of a person subservient to a monarch or prince, is an immoral man who is meant to serve as an allegory of both the reign of Kaiser Wilhelm II and German society of his time.

The novel was completed during the July Crisis in 1914, shortly before the outbreak of World War I. Extracts had been published in the satirical magazine Simplicissimus from 1912 onwards, causing great controversy. Mann signed a contract with the magazine Die Zeit im Bild for the publication of the censored version of the novel from the beginning of 1914, but on 1 August the publication was stopped as "inappropriate". A book edition was not published until 1918 by Kurt Wolff in Leipzig.

In the novel, Hessling gains a doctorate of chemistry and then starts a business career as a paper manufacturer. He becomes an influential figure in local politics, but his inflexible ideals are contradicted by his own actions. He supports militarism, anti-socialism, and Christian morality, but he refuses to serve in the military, he regularly uses slander against his business rivals, and he acts as the main political supporter of a social democratic politician in order to advance his business schemes.

== Plot ==
The socio-critical novel portrays the life of Diederich Hessling, a slavish and fanatical admirer of Kaiser Wilhelm II, as an archetype of Wilhelmine Germany. The name "Hessling" alludes to the German word for ugly, "hässlich". Hessling is unthinkingly obedient to authority and maintains a rigid dedication to the nationalist goals of the newly created German Empire.

As a self-conscious and snivelling child, he acts as an informer. He later gains self-confidence by joining a duelling student fraternity, practising as a drunkard and Stammtisch agitator, and by narrowly obtaining a doctorate of chemistry. He becomes a paper manufacturer, family patriarch, and eventually the most influential man in his small town.

Throughout the novel, Hessling's inflexible ideals are often contradicted by his actions: he preaches bravery but is a coward; he is the strongest militarist but seeks to be excused from conscription; his greatest political opponents are the Marxist Social Democratic Party of Germany (SPD), yet he uses his influence to help get his hometown's SPD candidate to the Reichstag parliament, in order to defeat his liberal business competitors; he starts vicious rumors against the latter and then dissociates himself from them; he both preaches and enforces Christian morality against others but lies, cheats, and regularly commits adultery.

The plot ends with the solemn inauguration of an Emperor William monument, with Hessling delivering the speech, which is abruptly terminated by an apocalyptic thunderstorm. He also faces the death of Buck, an elderly veteran of the democratic 1848 Revolution.

== Reception and criticism ==
When the novel was fully published in German in 1918, it immediately sold nearly 100,000 copies — the success that Heinrich Mann never achieved again in his entire life, while the author was denounced as a traitor to his country for his "unpatriotic" or even "Communist" stance; at the same time, some reviewers described it as an "account of a gullible people seduced by power". Thomas Mann, Heinrich's more famous young brother who supported Germany in the war, rejected the work as an irresponsible social satire unrelated to the reality, "sheer nonsense", and wrote that "and if it deserved a more noble name, more noble than that of international defamation and national slander, then it would be: ruthless aestheticism". This attitude towards the novel was based not only on his political views and his conflict with his brother: in Reflections of a Nonpolitical Man, a book where Thomas Mann advocated the authoritarianism of the Kaiserreich and defended the war of "German culture" with "the Western civilization", he contrasted his own work based on irony with satire and political art, criticizing the latter two. On the other hand, the novel was welcomed by the Expressionists, whom Thomas Mann also criticized in his book, welcomed the novel as "a long-overdue injection of political blood into the German people". The novel turned Heinrich Mann into a public intellectual whose writings were in the centre of intellectual and political debates off the Weimar Republic, also famous as a person who participated in the November Revolution and worked with the Socialist Kurt Eisner.

After the novel was reissued after the end of World War II, it was dismissed by the critics who claimed satire to be an inferior form of art by definition; some rejected the novel as 'historically inaccurate' by saying that Hessling was "too bad" to be "true"; on the other hand, the novel became a bestseller again, and the supportive critics described it as a great work of world literature, notable for its "prophetic" depiction of "quintessential Wilhelmian German" and his psychological predispositions that founded the authoritarian personality of the 1930s and resulted in the rise of Nazism; Kurt Tucholsky praised it as the "herbarium of the German man". The novel achieved the peak of its popularity in DDR and the Soviet Union, where it was regarded as 'the original anti-fascist novel' and 'the masterpiece of bourgeois-realist literature'. In the West Germany, however, the author was denounced as a Communist sympathizer and the novel was not published until 1964; it was rediscovered primarily under influence of the 1968 student movement. Frederick Betz, a modern critic, regards the novel as "one of the great political novels of the 20th century" for its depiction of the conflict between the authority and democratic principles.

The novel is frequently read in German schools up to today.

Among the problems of the artistic structure of the novel that are often "obscured" by its "evaluations of the political dimensions" Karin V. Gunnemann noted "inconsistencies in the plot" and "confusing labyrynth of intrigues and the exaggerated descriptions of facts" which Mann uses as "elements of the world he wishes to depict", which, however, may be viewed as "a device to reach a unity of form with content", praised by Mark Roche as "an aesthetic corollary of Hessling's self-contradictory concepts of justice."

== Themes ==
By following the form of a traditional Realist bildungsroman, Mann satirizes the education of a German bourgeois. Diederich's ideals, blood and iron, and the might of opulent power, are exposed as hollowness and weakness. He is an allegory depicting and satirizing the German people's increasing susceptibility to militarism, ultra-nationalism, anti-Semitism, and colonialism. His character is often juxtaposed, in both words and appearance to Kaiser Wilhelm II. In one instance, Hessling's behavior and outward appearance move an observer to stammer, 'It almost seems to me...You look so very much like His ...' , meaning the Kaiser.

Cover Penguin Modern Classics edition

Mann uses the moral bankruptcy and shallow ridiculousness of Hessling's life to critique both Wilhelminism and the German culture of the period. Like other German novels of the era, such as Theodor Fontane's Effi Briest, or even his brother Thomas Mann's Buddenbrooks, the principal target is the hypocrisy of the middle class and the risk of social collapse in a nation of loyal 'Untertan' citizens.

The novel introduces modern psychological insights and reveals Hessling's sado-masochism in such episodes as him decorating the headmaster's cane and satisfaction when being punished, up to the climax of facing the Kaiser's "power which transcends us and whose hoofs we kiss."

Mann expected the readers to gain insight into the real word by means both the content and the form of text; by following the French social novelists and writing the novel as a parody of Realist bildungsroman, he represented his view on the life in Imperial Germany as "a parody on the self and of ideologies and events", where German imperialists lived their lives as parodies of national pride and of will to dominate the world, and parodies of realism, as they "refused to respect anything that cannons could not destroy, and they despised things invisible that live in the mind", as Mann explained in his 1929 preface to the novel.

== Adaptations ==
A lithograph named Der Untertan was created by Karl Hubbuch in 1923.

In East Germany, the book was made into the 1951 DEFA film Der Untertan (released in English as The Kaiser's Lackey), directed by Wolfgang Staudte and starring Werner Peters as Diederich Hessling. It received the National Prize of the German Democratic Republic and initially was banned in West Germany until a shortened version was released in 1957. A radio drama was produced by the public Westdeutscher Rundfunk broadcaster in 1971.

The BBC adapted the book for a six-part TV mini-series Man of Straw, broadcast in 1972, with Derek Jacobi as Hessling.

An adaption for the 21st century, 'The economic Untertan', was published as 'self-write book': https://philarchive.org/rec/KORTEU

== English translations ==
The Patrioteer, done by Ernest Boyd and published in English in 1921, became the first translation of the novel and the first Mann's novel published in English. After the World War II, the translation was reissued under the titles Little Superman (a reference to the concept of Übermensch and its usage in the Nazi propaganda) and Man of Straw in 1945 and 1947 respectively. In 1998, the incomplete translation by Boyd was adapted as The Loyal Subject, with new portions translated by Daniel Theisen, edited by Helmut Peitsch. This new version is regarded as more accurate, adequate to the original and complete.
