= Der Untertan (film) =

1951 East German film

- Directed by: Wolfgang Staudte
- Written by: Heinrich Mann
- Screenplay by: Fritz Staudte, Wolfgang Staudte
- Produced by: Willi Teichmann
- Starring: Werner Peters
- Narrated by: Wolfgang Staudte
- Cinematography: Robert Baberske
- Edited by: Johanna Rosinski
- Music by: Horst Hanns Sieber
- Production company: DEFA
- Distributed by: Progress Film (GDR); Europa-Filmverleih (FRG)
- Release dates: 31 August 1951 (GDR); 8 March 1957 (FRG)
- Running time: 109 minutes
- Country: East Germany
- Language: German
- Budget: 2,100,000 East German Marks

The Kaiser's Lackey (German: der Untertan; also known in English as Man of Straw and The Loyal Subject) is a 1951 East German film directed by Wolfgang Staudte, based on Heinrich Mann's 1918 satirical novel by the same name.

== Plot ==
Diederich Heßling is a typical Prussian subject of pre-World War I Germany: he is blindly loyal to Kaiser Wilhelm II and deeply admires him, supports extreme nationalist policies and his country's militaristic tradition and claims to be an honorable, just person. In spite of this, he evades military service and uses his connections with government officials to destroy his business rivals. Heßling's life, from his childhood, is characterized by being slavishly subservient to his superiors while tyrannizing those below him.

When Heßling unveils a monument to Kaiser Wilhelm I before his city's dignitaries, he carries a speech in which he announces that Germany cannot prosper in peace, but can only achieve glory on the battlefield. A storm breaks, scattering the attendants, but he continues his speech, waving his fist at the sky. As he bows before the statue before leaving, the background music changes to Listz's préludes, and Die Deutsche Wochenschau's opening signal is heard. The picture blurs, and the statue is seen again amid the ruins of the city, destroyed after the bombings of World War II. Heßling's last words about the need for war are heard; the narrator announces that so has he spoken then, and many others after him - until this very day.

== Cast ==
- Werner Peters as Diederich Heßling
- Paul Esser as von Wulckow
- Renate Fischer as Guste Daimchen
- Ernst Legal as Pastor Zillich
- Raimund Schelcher as Dr. Wolfgang Buck
- Eduard von Winterstein as Buck senior
- Friedrich Maurer as Göppel
- Sabine Thalbach as Agnes Göppel
- Hannsgeorg Laubenthal as Mahlmann
- Paul Mederow as Dr. Heuteuffel
- Friedrich Richter as Fabrikbesitzer Lauer
- Friedrich Gnaß as Napoleon Fischer
- Wolfgang Kühne as Dr. Mennicke
- Fritz Staudte as Kühlemann
- Axel Triebel as Major Kunze
- Hannjo Hasse as man at the duel

== Production ==
Heinrich Mann's satirical novel der Untertan, with its attack on Wilhelmine conservatism, was held in high esteem by the Socialist Unity Party of Germany; it was entered into the schools' curriculum, and the cultural establishment viewed it as vital for re-educating the populace.

Director Wolfgang Staudte first suggested adapting the novel to the screen in 1946; while visiting London for the premiere of The Murderers Are Among Us, he was approached by a local critic, Hans H. Wollenberg, who told him he should direct a picture based on the book. After returning to East Berlin, Staudte discussed the idea with officials from the DEFA studio, who approved of it. Yet since such a work would have had to receive the permission of the author, who resided in California, no steps were taken to realize it.

During 1949, as Mann was elected President of the Academy of the Arts and planned his emigration to the German Democratic Republic, DEFA concluded to resume the project. On 23 September 1949, a letter from the studio requesting his approval to make the film was sent to Mann, whose positive reply reached East Germany on 24 October.

Staudte was not the first chosen to direct der Untertan: Falk Harnack and even Erich von Stroheim were considered by the studio. He received the nomination after rejecting making The Axe of Wandsbek, which was turned on to Harnack. It was his first full-length adaptation of a literary work. The director declared that in making the film, he sought to "depict the compliance of certain people, which since 1900 had propelled this country through two World Wars until Germany's downfall in 1945. This is a further indictment on my part of such persons, which I expressed already in The Murderers Are Among Us."

Principal photography commenced in the Babelsberg Studios on 1 March 1951. While working on the film, Staudte was almost completely exempt from interference by state censors: the establishment regarded the picture as highly important, and did not subject it to the demands of the Anti-formalism campaign which began in the GDR at the time. However, on one occasion party functionaries demanded to remove a scene in which a man and a woman embraced each other, claiming it would "have a negative influence on workers' morality."

In spite of budget concerns, the picture's final expenditures amounted to only 2,100,000 East German Mark, 430,000 Mark lower than originally approved by the studio.

== Reception ==
Der Untertan sold 4,524,979 tickets in East Germany. On 7 October 1951, Staudte received the National Prize of East Germany, 2nd degree, for his work on it; Werner Peters was awarded the 3rd degree prize. The film also won a special prize for promoting social progress in the same year's Karlovy Vary International Film Festival.

On 2 September 1951, The reviewer of Neues Deutschland wrote that "like the novel", the film "has one weakness": its "failure to present the great successes of the militant working class". Most East German critics - in accordance with their government's position - stressed the picture was not only meant to condemn the German past, but also militaristic tendencies in the Federal Republic of Germany. Daniela Berghahn noted that in having Heßling carry a speech in a Hitler-like fashion and inserting Die Deutsche Wochenschau's opening signal in the final scene, the film drew a parallel between Wilhelmine and the Third Reich Ulrike Wekel added that when the narrator claimed "So declared then Heßling... and many others, until this very day", it drew the parallel further, to the contemporary West Germany. However, a columnist in the GDR's CDU newspaper Neue Zeit wrote that "one must not only see the film as set against the Neo-Nazis and capitalists in the West... But also ask oneself if there is no Heßling lurking inside of him."

In West Germany, the film was regarded by the government as communist sedition, and it was banned - although many closed screenings took place in the FRG. Der Spiegel claimed it was "a supposedly a-political film, that is actually intended to raise public opinion in the West against the Federal Republic, in order to disrupt its rearmament." In late 1956, after the Communist Party of Germany was declared illegal by the Federal Constitutional Court of Germany, the authorities reconsidered the ban. In February 1957, the film was allowed in cinemas in West Germany, albeit with twelve minutes edited out and a disclaimer asserting the protagonist was fictional. It was popular with audiences in the country. The full version remained banned until 1971, when it was broadcast on television.

The film was first screened in the United States on 2 February 1960, by Cinema 16; Amos Vogel described it as "a highly revealing and interesting work", while the British Film Institute noted that "the direction is powerful, biting and sustained; the acting and photography on a very high level indeed!" Antonin and Miera Liehm wrote that Staudte made "sharp satire of German bourgeoisie". Stephen Brockmann commented: "Heßling's tyrannical behavior towards his subordinates... and slavish worship of authority figures... is presented as typical to the German bourgeoisie and a major factor in Germany's descent into barbarism."

Ulrike Wekel concluded that der Untertan also attacked - "intentionally or not" - the "functionaries' methods and blind obedience of the SED state", while that its censure in West Germany made the audience there understand that this mentality was still widespread in their country as well.

In 1995, a team of journalists and academics appointed by Deutsche Kinemathek selected the film as one of the hundred most important pictures in Germany's history.

== Bibliography ==
- Michael Grisko. Der Untertan - Revisited. Bertz & Fischer (2007). ISBN 978-3-86505-179-0.
- Karsten Forbrig, Antje Kirsten (editors). Il était une fois en RDA...: Une rétrospective de la DEFA. Peter Lang (2010). ISBN 978-3-0343-0030-8.
- Thomas Lindenberger (editor). Massenmedien im Kalten Krieg: Akteure, Bilder, Resonanzen. Böhlau Verlag (2006). ISBN 978-3-412-23105-7.
- Ulrich Behrens. Geschichte im Film - Film in der Geschichte. BoD (2009). ISBN 978-3-8370-9233-2.
- Ingrid Poss. Spur der Filme: Zeitzeugen über die DEFA. Links (2006). ISBN 978-3-86153-401-3.
- Daniela Berghahn. Hollywood Behind the Wall: the Cinema of East Germany. Manchester University Press (2005). ISBN 978-0-7190-6172-1.
- Uschi and Andreas Schmidt-Lenhard. Courage und Eigensinn. Zum 100. Geburtstag von Wolfgang Staudte. Röhrig Universitätsverlag (2006). ISBN 978-3-86110-415-5.
- Wolfgang Emmerich. Heinrich Mann: Der Untertan. Text und Geschichte. Leske & Budrich (2000). ISBN 978-3-8100-2732-0.
- Eric Rentschler. German Film and Literature. Methuen (1986). ISBN 978-0-416-60331-6.
- Scott MacDonald, Amos Vogel. Cinema 16: Documents Toward History Of Film Society. Wide Angle Books (2002). ISBN 978-1-56639-924-1.
- Stephen Brockmann. A Critical History of German Film. Camden House (2010). ISBN 978-1-57113-468-4.
- Detlef Kannapin. Antifaschismus im Film der DDR. Papyros Verlag (1997). ISBN 978-3-89438-142-4.
- Miera Liehm, Antonin J. Liehm. The Most Important Art: Soviet and Eastern European Film After 1945. University of California Press (1977). ISBN 0-520-04128-3
