= Edward Dmytryk =

American film director (1908–1999)

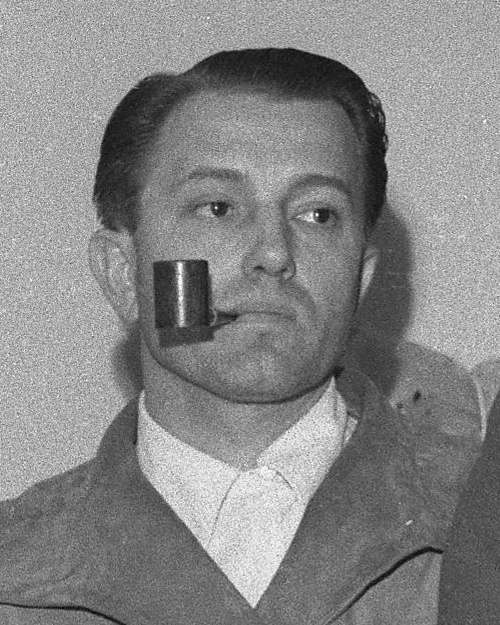
- Dmytryk in 1947
- Born: September 4, 1908; Grand Forks, British Columbia, Canada
- Died: July 1, 1999 (aged 90); Encino, Los Angeles, California, U.S.
- Resting place: Forest Lawn Memorial Park, Hollywood Hills
- Occupations: Film director; film editor
- Years active: 1929–1979
- Spouses: Madeleine Robinson (m. 1932; div. 1947) Jean Porter (m. 1948)
- Children: 4

Edward Dmytryk (September 4, 1908 – July 1, 1999) was a Canadian-born American film director and editor. He was known for his 1940s noir films and received an Oscar nomination for Best Director for Crossfire (1947). In 1947, he was named as one of the Hollywood Ten, a group of blacklisted film industry professionals who refused to testify to the House Un-American Activities Committee (HUAC) in their investigations during the Red Scare of the McCarthy era. They all served time in prison for contempt of Congress. In 1951, Dmytryk testified to the HUAC and named individuals, including Arnold Manoff, whose careers were then destroyed for many years, to rehabilitate his own career. First hired again by independent producer Stanley Kramer in 1952, Dmytryk is likely best known for directing The Caine Mutiny (1954), a critical and commercial success. The second-highest-grossing film of the year, it was nominated for Best Picture and several other awards at the 1955 Oscars. Dmytryk was nominated for a Directors Guild Award for Outstanding Directorial Achievement in Motion Pictures.

== Background ==
Dmytryk was born on September 4, 1908, in Grand Forks, British Columbia, Canada. His Ukrainian immigrant parents were Frances (Berezowski) and Michael Dmytryk, a severe disciplinarian who bounced among jobs as truck driver, smelter worker, and motorman. The family moved to San Francisco, California, and then to Los Angeles. After his mother died, his father remarried.

== Career ==
Dmytryk worked as a messenger at Famous Players–Lasky (forerunner of Paramount Pictures) for $6 per week while attending Hollywood High School. He progressed to projectionist, film editor, and by age 31, a director and a naturalized citizen of the United States.

=== 1930–1940s ===
Dmytryk worked in the editing department on films such as The Dance of Life (1929), Only Saps Work (1930), The Royal Family of Broadway (1930), Make Me a Star (1932), The Phantom President (1932), and If I Had a Million (1932). He helped edit two Leo McCarey movies: Duck Soup (1933) and Six of a Kind (1934). He edited College Rhythm (1934), followed by Leo McCarey's Ruggles of Red Gap (1935).

Dmytryk made his directorial debut with The Hawk (1935), a low-budget, independent Western. He returned to editing duties at Paramount, but was assigned to B films:Too Many Parents (1936), Three Cheers for Love (1936), Three Married Men (1936), Easy to Take (1936), Murder Goes to College (1937), Turn Off the Moon (1937), Double or Nothing (1937) with Bing Crosby, and That Navy Spirit (1937). Dmytryk also edited Bulldog Drummond's Peril (1938) and Prison Farm (1938). He moved his way to A movies with Zaza (1938), directed by George Cukor. McCarey asked him over to RKO to edit Love Affair (1939). He returned to Paramount to edit the Bob Hope comedy Some Like It Hot (1939).

Dmytryk did some uncredited directing on Million Dollar Legs (1939) with Betty Grable. This encouraged Paramount to allow him to direct Television Spy (1939). He followed it with Emergency Squad (1940), Golden Gloves (1940), and Mystery Sea Raider (1940) with Carole Landis.

Dmytryk went to Monogram Pictures to direct the musical Her First Romance (1940).

He went over to Columbia to direct for its B picture unit: The Devil Commands (1941) with Boris Karloff, Under Age (1941), Broadway Ahead (1941), Hot Pearls (1941), Secrets of the Lone Wolf (1941), Confessions of Boston Blackie (1941), and Counter-Espionage (1942), a "Lone Wolf" movie.

Dmytryk signed a contract to RKO, where he continued to direct B movies, starting with Seven Miles from Alcatraz (1942). However, he then made Hitler's Children (1943), which turned out to be a massive "sleeper" hit, earning over $3 million.

The one-time success did not immediately change his career, and he remained in B movies such as The Falcon Strikes Back (1943), and then went to Universal for Captive Wild Woman (1943). Back at RKO, he directed Behind the Rising Sun (1943), a Hitler's Children-style thriller about the Japanese. It was another box-office sensation, and Dmytryk was promoted to A films.

Dmytryk directed Ginger Rogers, RKO's biggest star, in the melodrama Tender Comrade (1943), which was a huge hit. He followed it with the popular film noir Murder, My Sweet (1944), adapted from Raymond Chandler's novel Farewell, My Lovely by John Paxton and produced by Adrian Scott; the star was Dick Powell, whose performance as Philip Marlowe completely revitalized Powell's career. Dymtryk did Back to Bataan (1945), a war film starring John Wayne, then he was reunited with Powell, Paxton, and Scott for another film noir, Cornered (1945). He did Till the End of Time (1946), a drama about soldiers coming back from the war, which was a big hit, and went to England to make So Well Remembered (1947) with Paxton and Scott.

Dmytryk, Scott, and Paxton then collaborated on the hugely successful thriller Crossfire (1947), for which Dmytryk received a Best Director Oscar nomination. The success of his pictures and recognition from his peers established him as RKO's leading director.

=== Hollywood Ten ===
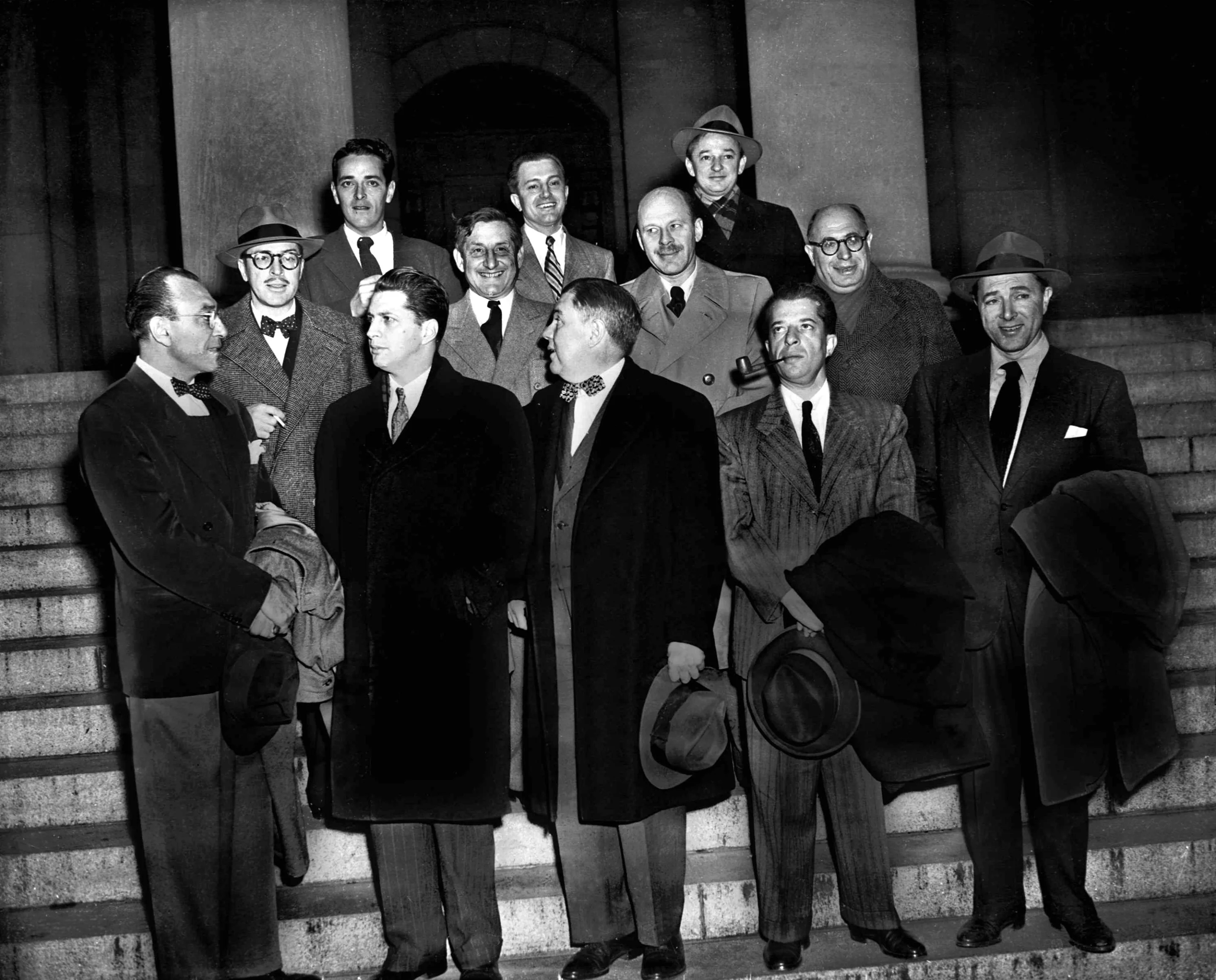
"The Hollywood Ten" stand with their attorneys outside district court in Washington, D.C. before arraignment on contempt of Congress charges. The ten were charged for refusing to cooperate with the House Un-American Activities Committee. (Front row, L-R): Herbert Biberman, attorney Martin Popper, attorney Robert W. Kenny, Albert Maltz and Lester Cole. (Second row, L-R): Dalton Trumbo, John Howard Lawson, Alvah Bessie and Samuel Ornitz. (Top row, L-R): Ring Lardner Jr., Edward Dmytryk and Adrian Scott.

Dmytryk was among those called to testify before the House Un-American Activities Committee (HUAC) in 1947. Dmytryk briefly had been a Communist Party member in 1944 and 1945. He was persuaded by his former party associates to join nine other Hollywood figures in a public refusal to testify. The Hollywood Ten were cited for contempt of Congress and sentenced to prison terms. Dmytryk was fired from RKO.

Dmytryk fled to England and unofficially was ostracized by the American film industry and his former friends in it. In England, he made two films for producer Nat Bronstein: a thriller Obsession (1949), and Give Us This Day (1949), a neo-realistic movie sympathetic to the working man, based on the novel Christ in Concrete. The latter movie, which was successful in Europe, was released as Christ in Concrete in the United States and quickly suppressed. When his U.S. passport expired, Dmytryk returned to the United States, where he was arrested and imprisoned. He served four months and 17 days in Millspoint Prison, West Virginia.

On April 25, 1951, Dmytryk appeared before HUAC for the second time and answered all questions. He spoke of his own brief party membership in 1945 and named party members, including seven film directors: Arnold Manoff, Frank Tuttle, Herbert Biberman, Jack Berry, Bernard Vorhaus, Jules Dassin, and Michael Gordon, and 15 others. He said that he was prompted to change his mind by the Alger Hiss case, the discovery of spies in the U.S. and Canada, and the invasion of South Korea. He said that John Howard Lawson, Adrian Scott, Albert Maltz, and others had pressured him to include communist elements in his films. His testimony damaged several court cases that others of the "Ten" had filed.

He recounted his experiences of the period in his 1996 book, Odd Man Out: A Memoir of the Hollywood Ten (see bibliography).

=== 1950s–1980s ===
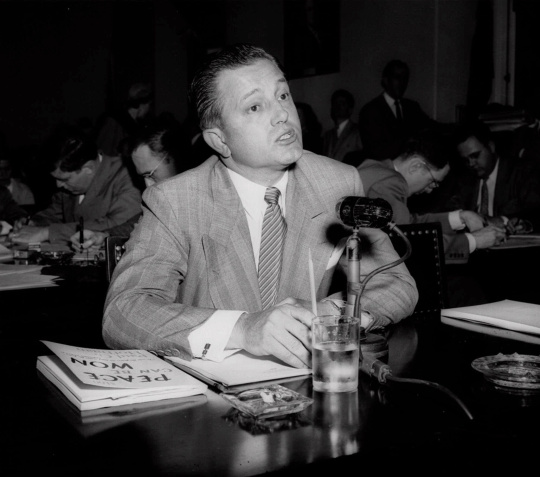
Dmytryk in 1951

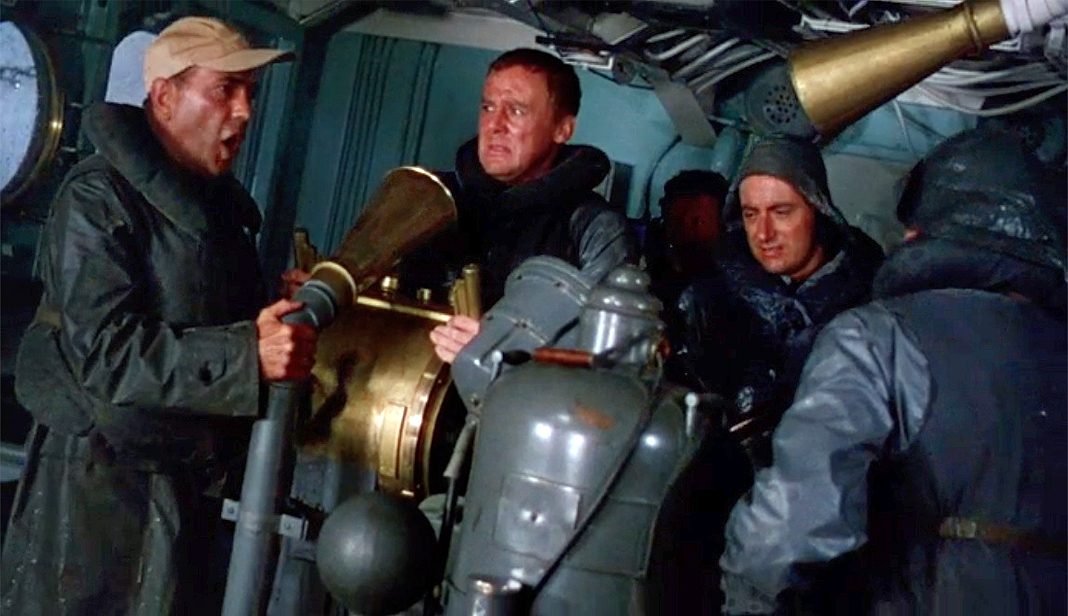
Dmytryk directed Humphrey Bogart and Van Johnson in The Caine Mutiny in 1954.

Dmytryk's first film after his testimony was Mutiny (1952) from the King Brothers. Independent American producer Stanley Kramer then hired Dmytryk to direct a trio of low-budget films for Kramer's company, which were released through Columbia: The Sniper (1952), Eight Iron Men (1952) and The Juggler (1953) with Kirk Douglas. In between, he directed Three Lives (1953), a short film for the United Jewish Appeal.

Kramer then selected Dmytryk to direct Humphrey Bogart and Van Johnson in Columbia's The Caine Mutiny (1954), a World War II naval drama adapted from Herman Wouk's Pulitzer Prize-winning novel. It proved to be a great critical and commercial success, ranking second among high-grossing films of the year, and in 1955, received Oscar nominations for Best Picture and Best Actor.

Dmytryk went over to 20th Century Fox, where he directed Spencer Tracy and Robert Wagner in Broken Lance (1954). He went to England to do The End of the Affair (1955) with Deborah Kerr and Van Johnson for Columbia, then returned to Fox to make Soldier of Fortune (1955) with Clark Gable, The Left Hand of God (1955) with Bogart, and The Mountain (1956) with Tracy and Wagner. Dmytryk produced the latter.

He went to MGM, then under his old RKO boss Dore Schary, to make Raintree County (1957) with Montgomery Clift and Elizabeth Taylor. At Fox, he did The Young Lions (1958), a popular war film with Clift and Marlon Brando, then the Western Warlock (1959) (which he produced), and a flop remake of The Blue Angel (1959).

Dmytryk made Walk on the Wild Side (1962) for producer Charles Feldman, which was a difficult production. He produced and directed The Reluctant Saint (1962). He had a huge hit with The Carpetbaggers (1964) from the novel by Harold Robbins for producer Joseph E. Levine. He was given Where Love Has Gone (1964), another Robbins adaptation by Levine. This was followed by the Gregory Peck thriller Mirage (1965), the William Holden Western Alvarez Kelly (1966), the war film Anzio (1968), and Shalako (1968), a Western with Sean Connery and Brigitte Bardot.

Dmytryk wrote and directed Bluebeard (1972) with Richard Burton. He did the little-seen He Is My Brother (1975) and The 'Human' Factor (1975). His last film was Not Only Strangers (1979).

In the 1980s, Dmytryk entered academic life. He taught about film and directing at the University of Texas at Austin and at the University of Southern California film school. He wrote several books on the art of filmmaking (such as On Film Editing and On Screenwriting). He also appeared on the lecture circuit, speaking at various colleges and theaters, such as the Orson Welles Cinema.

== Personal life and death ==
Dmytryk married his second wife, actress Jean Porter, on May 12, 1948.

He died at age 90 on July 1, 1999, in Encino, California, from heart and kidney failure. He was the penultimate survivor of the Hollywood Ten. The tenth, Ring Lardner Jr., died on October 31, 2000. Dmytryk was buried at the Forest Lawn Memorial Park, in Hollywood.

== Legacy and honors ==
- 1948: Best Director (Oscar nomination) for Crossfire
- 1955: Best Picture (Oscar nomination) for The Caine Mutiny
- 1955: Directors Guild Award (nomination) for Outstanding Directorial Achievement in Motion Pictures

== Filmography ==
This filmography lists all the feature films directed by Dmytryk and may be complete:

- The Hawk (1935)
- Million Dollar Legs (uncredited; 1939)
- Television Spy (1939)
- Emergency Squad (1940)
- Golden Gloves (1940)
- Mystery Sea Raider (1940)
- Her First Romance (1940)
- The Devil Commands (1941)
- Under Age (1941)
- Sweetheart of the Campus (1941)
- The Blonde from Singapore (1941)
- Secrets of the Lone Wolf (1941)
- Confessions of Boston Blackie (1941)
- Counter-Espionage (1942)
- Seven Miles from Alcatraz (1942)
- Hitler's Children (1943)
- The Falcon Strikes Back (1943)
- Captive Wild Woman (1943)
- Behind the Rising Sun (1943)
- Tender Comrade (1943)
- Murder, My Sweet (1944)
- Back to Bataan (1945)
- Cornered (1945)
- Till the End of Time (1946)
- So Well Remembered (1947)
- Crossfire (1947)
- Obsession (1949)
- Give Us This Day (1949)
- Mutiny (1952)
- The Sniper (1952)
- Eight Iron Men (1952)
- The Juggler (1953)
- The Caine Mutiny (1954)
- Broken Lance (1954)
- The End of the Affair (1954)
- Soldier of Fortune (1955)
- The Left Hand of God (1955)
- The Mountain (1956)
- Raintree County (1957)
- The Young Lions (1958)
- Warlock (1959)
- The Blue Angel (1959)
- Walk on the Wild Side (1962)
- The Reluctant Saint (1962)
- The Carpetbaggers (1964)
- Where Love Has Gone (1964)
- Mirage (1965)
- Alvarez Kelly (1966)
- Anzio (1968)
- Shalako (1968)
- Bluebeard (1972)
- He Is My Brother (1975)
- The "Human" Factor (1975)

== See also ==
- The Hollywood Ten documentary

== Bibliography ==
- Dmytryk, Edward (1996). Odd Man Out: a Memoir of the Hollywood Ten. Carbondale, Illinois, USA: Southern Illinois University Press. ISBN 0-8093-1999-3.
