= Romy Schneider filmography =

Romy Schneider (1938–1982) was a German-French actress who starred in a number of films in Germany, France, Italy, and the United States.

== Filmography ==
Year	Title	Role	Director	Notes
1953	When the White Lilacs Bloom Again (Wenn der weiße Flieder wieder blüht)	Evchen Förster	Hans Deppe	
1954	Fireworks (Feuerwerk)	Anna Oberholzer	Paul Burkhard, Erik Charell, and Kurt Hoffmann	
1954	Victoria in Dover (Mädchenjahre einer Königin)	Princess Victoria / Queen Victoria	Ernst Marischka	
1955	Die Deutschmeister	Stanzi Hübner	Ernst Marischka	
1955	The Last Man	Niddy Hoevelmann	Harald Braun	
1955	Sissi	Sissi	Ernst Marischka	
1956	Kitty and the Great Big World	Kitty Dupont	Alfred Weidenmann	
1956	Sissi – Die junge Kaiserin	Sissi	Ernst Marischka	
1957	The Girl and the Legend	Maud	Josef von Báky	
1957	Love from Paris (Monpti)	Anne-Claire Jouvain	Helmut Käutner	
1957	Sissi – Schicksalsjahre einer Kaiserin	Sissi	Ernst Marischka	
1958	Scampolo	Scampolo	Alfred Weidenmann	
1958	Mädchen in Uniform	Manuela von Meinhardis	Géza von Radványi	
1958	Christine	Christine Weiring	Pierre Gaspard-Huit	
1959	Eva (Die Halbzarte)	Nicole	Rolf Thiele	
1959	Mademoiselle Ange (Ein Engel auf Erden)	Stewardess / Angel	Géza von Radványi	
1959	Die schöne Lügnerin	Fanny Emmetsrieder	Axel von Ambesser	
1959	Magnificent Sinner (Katia)	Katia	Robert Siodmak	
1960	Purple Noon (Plein soleil)	Freddie's companion	René Clément	Cameo, uncredited
1961	Lysistrata	Myrrhine / Uschi	Fritz Kortner	TV movie
1962	Boccaccio '70	Pupe	Luchino Visconti	segment "Il lavoro"
1962	Le Combat dans l'île	Anne	Alain Cavalier	
1962	The Trial	Leni	Orson Welles	
1963	The Victors	Regine	Carl Foreman	
1963	The Cardinal	Annemarie von Hartman	Otto Preminger	
1964	Good Neighbor Sam	Janet Lagerlof	David Swift	
1964	L'Enfer	Odette	Henri-Georges Clouzot	L'Enfer remained unfinished in 1964; much footage from the film was included in the documentary L'Enfer d'Henri-Georges Clouzot (2009) by Serge Bromberg.
1964	L'Amour à la mer	The star	Guy Gilles	
1965	What's New Pussycat?	Carole Werner	Clive Donner	
1966	La Voleuse	Julia Kreuz	Jean Chapot	
1966	10:30 P.M. Summer	Claire	Jules Dassin	
1966	Triple Cross	Countess	Terence Young	
1966	Is Paris Burning? (Paris brûle-t-il ?)		René Clément	scenes deleted
1967	Romy: Anatomy of a Face (Romy. Porträt eines Gesichts)	Herself	Hans-Jürgen Syberberg	
1969	The Swimming Pool	Marianne	Jacques Deray	
1969	Otley	Imogen	Dick Clement	
1970	The Things of Life	Hélène	Claude Sautet	
1970	My Lover, My Son	Francesca Anderson	John Newland	
1970	Qui ?	Marina	Léonard Keigel	
1971	Bloomfield	Nira	Richard Harris	
1970	Lady Caliph	Irene Corsini	Alberto Bevilacqua	
1971	Max et les ferrailleurs	Lily	Claude Sautet	
1972	The Assassination of Trotsky	Gita Samuels	Joseph Losey	
1972	César and Rosalie	Rosalie	Claude Sautet	
1973	Ludwig	Elisabeth of Austria	Luchino Visconti	
1973	The Train	Anna Kupfer	Pierre Granier-Deferre	
1974	Le Mouton enragé	Roberte Groult	Michel Deville	
1974	Un amour de pluie	Elizabeth	Jean-Claude Brialy	
1974	Le Trio infernal	Philomena Schmidt	Francis Girod	
1975	L'important c'est d'aimer	Nadine Chevalier	Andrzej Żuławski	
1975	Innocents with Dirty Hands	Julie Wormser	Claude Chabrol	
1975	Le vieux fusil	Clara Dandieu	Robert Enrico	
1976	Mado	Hélène	Claude Sautet	
1976	A Woman at Her Window (Une femme à sa fenêtre)	Margot Santorini	Pierre Granier-Deferre	
1977	Group Portrait with a Lady	Leni Gruyten	Aleksandar Petrović	
1978	A Simple Story	Marie	Claude Sautet	
1979	Bloodline	Hélène Martin	Terence Young	
1979	Clair de femme	Lydia Tovalski	Costa-Gavras	
1980	Death Watch	Katherine Mortenhoe	Bertrand Tavernier	
1980	The Lady Banker	Emma Eckhert	Francis Girod	
1981	Fantasma d'amore	Anna Brigatti Zighi	Dino Risi	
1981	Garde à vue	Chantal Martinaud	Claude Miller	
1982	The Passerby	Elsa Wiener / Lina Baumstein	Jacques Rouffio	
