= Claudio Capone =

Italian voice actor (1952–2008)

- Born: 18 November 1952; Rome, Italy
- Died: 23 June 2008 (aged 55); Perth, Scotland
- Occupations: Actor; voice actor; narrator
- Years active: 1964–2008
- Children: 2, including Davide Capone

Claudio Capone (18 November 1952 – 23 June 2008) was an Italian actor, voice actor and narrator.

== Biography ==
Born in Rome, Capone began an acting career on television at the age of 11. His first on screen appearance was in Il giornalino di Gian Burrasca directed by Lina Wertmüller. He also worked on stage alongside Luigi Almirante, Silvio Noto and Roldano Lupi. He devoted himself exclusively to dubbing and narrating in the 1970s.

Capone's most notable roles include the dubbing of Ridge Forrester in the Italian version of The Bold and the Beautiful, and Stephen Collins as the Rev. Eric Camden in 7th Heaven. Previously, he was also the voice of Luke Skywalker (portrayed by Mark Hamill) in the Star Wars original trilogy and as Carey Mahoney (portrayed by Steve Guttenberg) in the Police Academy franchise, the voice of Stephen Fry, who played Oscar Wilde in the film Wilde, Franz Joseph I of Austria in the Sissi trilogy, and Don Johnson in the programme Miami Vice.

As a popular film and television program narrator, he was the narrator of many documentaries on the Italian national television network RAI, but none more so than his narration of Rai's scientific documentary Superquark, presented by Piero Angela and Geo & Geo. His voice (and often his image) can be seen and heard in many national and local advertising campaigns in Italy.

=== Personal life ===
Capone was married with two children. His son Davide is also a voice actor.

== Death ==
Capone died of a stroke on 23 June 2008, at the age of 55, while in Scotland on business. He had been assisting with creating a documentary at the time. Two days before his death, he became extremely ill. Because of this, he had to be transported from Crieff to a nearby hospital in Perth where he died.

== Voice work ==
- Narrator in Il santo patrono
- Piccolo's second brother in L'eroe dei due mondi

=== Dubbing ===
==== Animation ====
- Bow in He-Man and She-Ra: The Secret of the Sword

==== Live action ====
- Luke Skywalker in Star Wars: Episode IV – A New Hope, Star Wars: Episode V – The Empire Strikes Back, Star Wars: Episode VI – Return of the Jedi
- Carey Mahoney in Police Academy, Police Academy 2: Their First Assignment, Police Academy 3: Back in Training, Police Academy 4: Citizens on Patrol
- Ridge Forrester in The Bold and the Beautiful
- James "Sonny" Crockett in Miami Vice
- Nash Bridges in Nash Bridges
- Oscar Wilde in Wilde
- Eric Camden in 7th Heaven
- Curt Henderson in American Graffiti
- Kit Carruthers in Badlands
- Sean Archer in Face/Off
- Franz Joseph I in Sissi (television redub), Sissi – The Young Empress (television redub), Sissi – Fateful Years of an Empress (television redub)
- Loomis Birkhead in 1941
- Andrei Sobinski in To Be or Not to Be
- Egon Spengler in Ghostbusters II
- John Winger in Stripes
- Basil Exposition in Austin Powers: International Man of Mystery
- Red in Britannia Hospital
- Lester in Crimes and Misdemeanors
- Ted in Manhattan Murder Mystery
- Bob Dandridge In Everyone Says I Love You
- George Malley in Phenomenon
