= Guinle =

Guinle is a surname. Notable people with the surname include:

- Christiana Guinle (born 1965), Brazilian actress and producer
- Eduardo Palassin Guinle (1846–1912), Brazilian businessman
- Jorge Guinle (1916–2004), Brazilian billionaire
- Marcelo Guinle (1947–2017), Argentine politician
