= Rosa Albach-Retty =

Austrian actress (1874–1980)

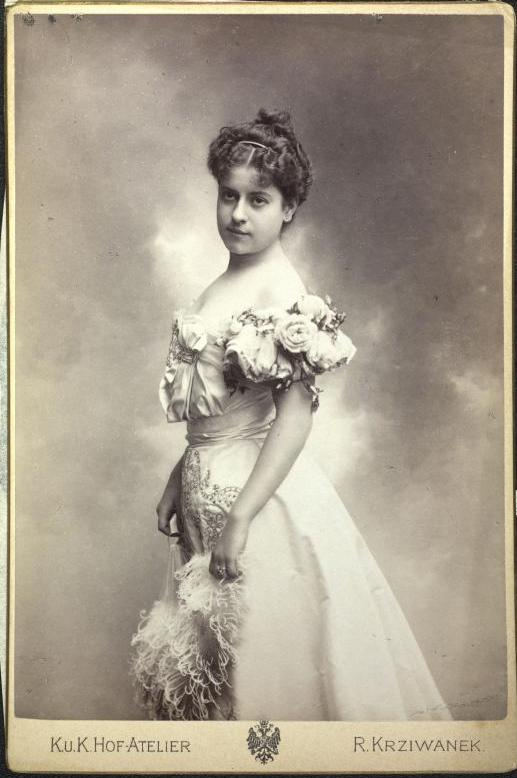
- Rosa Albach-Retty c. 1902
- Born: Rosa Clara Franziska Helene Retty; 26 December 1874; Hanau, Hesse-Nassau, German Empire
- Died: 26 August 1980 (aged 105); Baden bei Wien, Lower Austria, Austria
- Occupation: Actress
- Years active: 1890–1958
- Spouse: Karl Walter Albach
- Children: Wolf Albach-Retty
- Relatives: Romy Schneider (granddaughter); Sarah Biasini (great-granddaughter)

Rosa Albach-Retty (born Rosa Clara Franziska Helene Retty; 26 December 1874 – 26 August 1980) was an Austrian film and stage actress.

== Life ==
Born into a well-known family of actors, she was the daughter of actor and director Rudolf Retty. Trained by her father, she began her stage career in 1890 at the Deutsches Theater and the Lessing Theater in Berlin, where she performed as Franziska in Minna von Barnhelm. Hermann Sudermann wrote his play Die Schmetterlingsschlacht, which premiered in 1894 at the Lessing Theater, for her. She was also known for breeches roles in Little Lord Fauntleroy and The Merchant of Venice (1909 at the Burgtheater). In 1895, she went to the Volkstheater in Vienna and in 1903 joined the Burgtheater ensemble, where she received the title of Hofschauspielerin (Actress of the Court) in 1912. She became an honorary member of the Burgtheater in 1928 and in 1958, she gave her final performance.

She was married to the Austro-Hungarian Army officer Karl Albach; she was the mother of Wolf Albach-Retty (1906–1967), an Austrian movie actor who married German movie actress Magda Schneider in 1937. She was the grandmother of actress Romy Schneider and great-grandmother of actress Sarah Biasini.

Albach-Retty made her first film appearance in 1930, in Georg Jacoby's Money on the Street, and made her last appearance in the 1955 remake The Congress Dances directed by Franz Antel. She died in 1980 at the age of 105, not long after publishing her autobiography So kurz sind 100 Jahre to mark her centenary. Her grave of honour and that of her son are located in the Vienna Central Cemetery (group 32 C, number 50).

== Ties to the Nazis ==
=== Ties to the Nazi regime ===
The proximity of Albach-Retty to the National Socialist regime is well documented. Following the 1938 annexation of Austria to Nazi Germany, she enthusiastically celebrated the Anschluss in the Kleine Volks-Zeitung.

While her official membership in the NSDAP remains unproven, both she and her husband were supporting members (förderndes Mitglied) of the SS. As a prominent public figure and professed admirer of Adolf Hitler, Albach-Retty was highly courted by Nazi cultural policymakers and was subsequently included on Joseph Goebbels' "God-privileged list" (Gottbegnadeten-Liste) of artists deemed essential to the regime's war effort.

Her standing remained unaffected after the fall of the Nazi regime, as evidenced by multiple state honors awarded to her after 1945. In the 1970s, a Viennese municipal housing complex in the 19th district was named the "Rosa-Albach-Retty-Hof" in her honor.

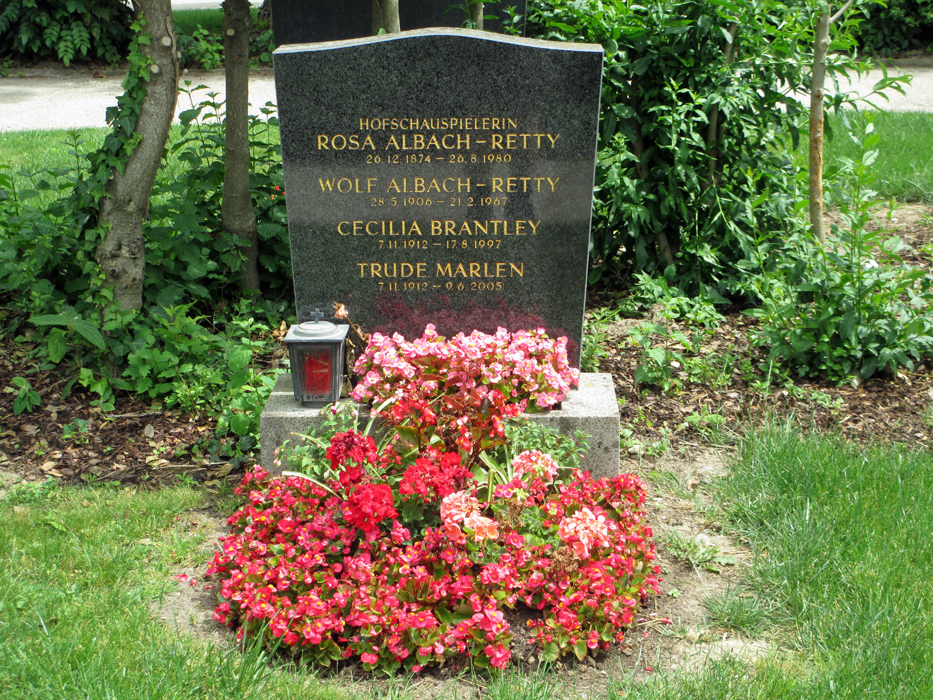
Grave of Albach-Retty at Vienna's Zentralfriedhof

== Selected filmography ==
- Money on the Street (1930)
- Episode (1935)
- Maria Ilona (1939)
- Hotel Sacher (1939)
- Thrice Wed (1941)
- Whom the Gods Love (1942)
- Vienna 1910 (1943)
- Maria Theresa (1951)
- Adventure in Vienna (1952)
- The Spendthrift (1953)
- The Congress Dances (1955)
- Klaus Peter Dencker in conversation with Rosa Albach-Retty. A production of Saarländischer Rundfunk / Television (45 minutes) (1979)

== Decorations and awards ==
- 1955: Grand Decoration of Honour for Services to the Republic of Austria
- 1958: Josef Kainz Medal
- 1960: Medal of Honour of the City of Vienna
- 1963: Austrian Cross of Honour for Science and Art, 1st class
- 1977: Grand Decoration of Honour in Silver for Services to the Republic of Austria

== Literature ==
- Rosa Albach-Retty (1978). Gertrud Svoboda-Srncik (ed.). So kurz sind hundert Jahre. Erinnerungen. Munich, Berlin: Herbig. ISBN 3-7766-0864-1. OCLC 5031371 – via Internet Archive.
- Robert Kittler: Rosa Albach-Retty. Ein Leben für das Theater. Diss. University Vienna, Vienna 1958
- Oliver Rathkolb: Führertreu und gottbegnadet. Künstlereliten im Dritten Reich. Österreichischer Bundesverlag, Vienna 1991, ISBN 3-215-07490-7
- Robert Teichl: Österreicher der Gegenwart. Lexikon schöpferischer und schaffender Zeitgenossen. Verlag der Österreichischen Staatsdruckerei, Vienna 1951
- Jürgen Trimborn: Romy und ihre Familie. Droemer, Munich 2008, ISBN 3-426-27451-5
