= Josef Meinrad =

Austrian actor

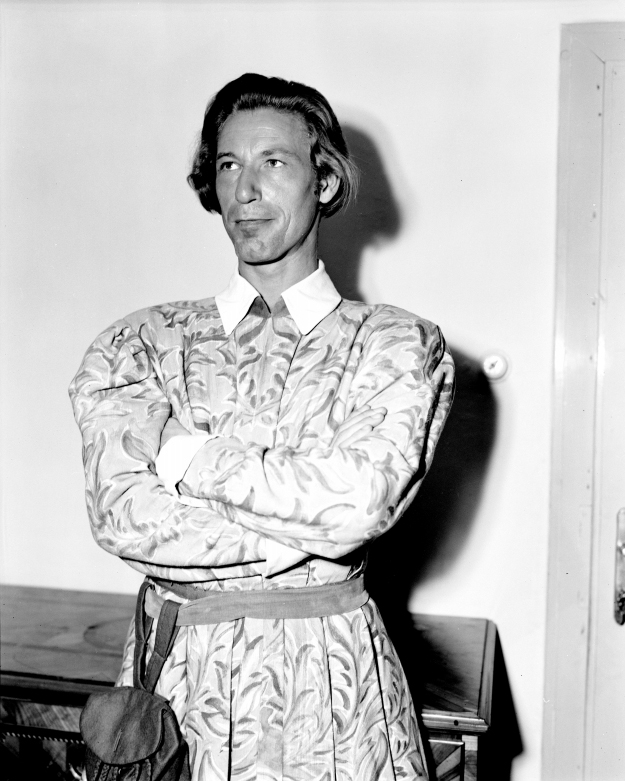
Waiting for his stage entry in Jedermann, Salzburg 1947

Josef Meinrad (Austrian German: [ˈjoːsɛf ˈmaɪnraːd]; 21 April 1913 – 18 February 1996) was an Austrian actor. From 1959 until his death in 1996, Meinrad held the Republic of Austria's Iffland-Ring, which passes from actor to actor — each bequeathing the ring to the next holder, judging that actor to be the "most significant and most worthy actor of the German-speaking theatre".

== Life ==
Josef Meinrad was born Josef Moučka in Vienna, as the fourth and youngest child of the tram driver Franz Moučka and his second wife Katharina. For his secondary education, he received a scholarship in a school run by Redemptorists in Katzelsdorf near Wiener Neustadt. At first, he wanted to become a priest, but he left the boarding school in 1929 and began a commercial apprenticeship, while taking acting lessons.

He made his public acting debut during a theatre festival at Korneuburg in 1930, by which time he called himself Josef Meinrad. Nevertheless, he finished his training and worked as a commercial clerk until 1935. From that time on, he performed on various smaller stages, passing his acting exam in 1937. His first brief engagement at the Vienna Burgtheater was in 1939, he then played at the German Theatre in Metz, mainly in front of Wehrmacht soldiers.

After the war, Meinrad again performed in Vienna. At the Salzburg Festival in 1947 he appeared in Jedermann. Later that year, Meinrad became a full-time permanent member of the Burgtheater company and was part of that ensemble until his 65th birthday in 1978. He played 195 roles on that stage and was famous for his performances in comedies by Johann Nestroy and Ferdinand Raimund. In 1968 he played the title role in the German-language premiere of Dale Wasserman's musical Man of La Mancha at the Theater an der Wien. He also appeared in several Films and TV series, chiefly known for his role as an adjutant in the Sissi trilogy starring Romy Schneider.

Meinrad was the keeper of the Iffland-Ring, which for 200 years has been given to the most important actor of the German-speaking theatre; he passed the ring on to Bruno Ganz.

From 1950 until his death he was married to Germaine Renée Clement, who died in 2006. Meinrad died in 1996 from cancer, aged 82, in Großgmain and is buried there.

== Honours and awards ==
- 1955: Appointed Kammerschauspieler
- 1959: Received the Iffland-Ring
- 1961: Blue Ribbon Award from the National Council Screen
- 1963: Kainz Medal
- 1963: Austrian Cross of Honour for Science and Art, 1st class
- 1973: Honorary Member of the Vienna Burgtheater
- 1980: Honorary Ring of the city of Bregenz
- 1983: Raymund Ring of the Federal Ministry for Education, Arts and Culture
- 1983: Honorary Ring of the Vienna
- 1985: Nestroy Ring
- 1997: Josef Meinrad-Platz near the Vienna Burgtheater

== Films ==
- Die Welt dreht sich verkehrt (1947) as Agha
- Triumph der Liebe (1947) as Kinesias
- The Trial (1948, about the Tiszaeszlár affair) as Bary, investigating judge
- Rendezvous im Salzkammergut (1948) as Peter Baumkirchner
- Anni (1948) as Heinrich Buchgraber
- Fregola (1948) as Dr. Wegscheider
- Das Siegel Gottes (1949) as Father Clemens
- Nothing But Coincidence (1949) as Willy Wendel
- Mein Freund, der nicht nein sagen konnte (1949) as Dr. Leopold Bachmann
- Bonus on Death (1950) as Seaman Matrose
- Theodore the Goalkeeper (1950) as Theo Haslinger Jr.
- Jetzt schlägt's 13 (1950) as Dr. Mario Jaconis
- Archduke Johann's Great Love (1950) as A friend of Archduke Johann
- Der Wallnerbub (1950) as Karl
- Love and Blood (1951) as Otto Schulz
- Shadows Over Naples (1951) as Otto Schulz
- Eva erbt das Paradies... ein Abenteuer im Salzkammergut (1951) as Hans Holzinger
- The Colourful Dream (1952) as Tobby Busch
- 1. April 2000 (1952) as Prime Minister of Austria
- Fräulein Casanova (1953) as Rolf Reimann
- The Spendthrift (1953) as Valentin
- Money from the Air (1954) as Stefan Gregor
- Kaisermanöver (1954) as Wondrasch
- Walking Back into the Past (1954) as Franz Nägele
- Die Deutschmeister (1955) as Hofrat Hofwirt
- Don Juan (1955) as Leporello
- His Daughter is Called Peter (1955) as Dr. Felix Weininger
- Sarajevo (1955) as Chauffeur
- The Congress Dances (1955) as Franzl Eder
- Sissi (1955) as Major Böckl
- Ein tolles Hotel (1956) as Edi Schlawinsky
- Opera Ball (1956) as Paul Hollinger
- Die Trapp-Familie (1956, cf. The Sound of Music) as Dr. Franz Wasner
- Sissi – Die junge Kaiserin (1956) as Major Böckl
- August, der Halbstarke (1957) as August Rums, genannt Gustl, Boxer
- The Schimeck Family (1957) as Baumann
- The Unexcused Hour (1957) as Fabian
- Goodbye, Franziska (1957) as Dr. Leitner
- Sissi – Schicksalsjahre einer Kaiserin (1957) as Lieutenant Colonel Böckl
- Man ist nur zweimal jung (1958)
- Solang' die Sterne glüh'n (1958) as Karl Eibisch
- The Trapp Family in America (1958) as Dr. Franz Wasner
- Whisky, Wodka, Wienerin (1959) as Ferdinand Windberger - Legationsrat
- Eva (1959) as Mr. Dassau
- Die schöne Lügnerin (1959) as Baron Hager
- Adorable Arabella (1959) as Archibald Duncan
- Napoleon II, the Eagle (1961) as Emperor Francis II
- Der Bauer als Millionär (1961) as Fortunatus Wurzel
- Liliom (1963, TV movie based on Liliom) as Liliom
- The Cardinal (1963) as Cardinal Innitzer
- The Spendthrift (1964) as Valentin
- Don Quixote (1965, TV miniseries based on Don Quixote) as Don Quixote
- Father Brown (1966–1972, TV series) as Father Brown
- Der Tod läuft hinterher (1967, TV Mini-Series) as Gaston
- Was ihr wollt (1973, TV movie based on Twelfth Night) as Malvolio
- The Robber Hotzenplotz (1974) as Magician Petrosilius Zwackelmann
- Die schöne Helena (1974, TV movie based on La belle Hélène) as Menelaus
- Gaslight (1977, TV movie based on Gas Light) as Jack Manningham
- Es war einmal der Mensch (1978, TV Series) as Narrator (German version, voice)
- Ringstraßenpalais (1983, TV Series) as Emil Hoffeneder
- Waldheimat (1984, TV Series) as Pfarrer
- Die Fledermaus (1984, TV movie based on Die Fledermaus) as Frosch
- Der Sonne entgegen (1985, TV Series) as Luca
- Der Unbestechliche (1986, TV movie) as Theodor
- Der Vorhang fällt (1986, TV movie) as Jakob
- Herschel und die Musik der Sterne (1986, TV movie) as Joseph Haydn

He appeared twice in the German TV series, Der Kommissar.
