= Victoria in Dover (1954 film) =

- Directed by: Ernst Marischka
- Written by: Sil-Vara (play); Ernst Marischka
- Produced by: Karl Ehrlich
- Starring: Romy Schneider; Adrian Hoven; Magda Schneider; Karl Ludwig Diehl
- Cinematography: Bruno Mondi
- Edited by: Hermann Leitner
- Music by: Anton Profes
- Production company: Erma-Film
- Distributed by: Sascha Film
- Release date: 16 December 1954
- Running time: 118 minutes
- Country: Austria
- Language: German

Victoria in Dover (aka The Story of Vickie) (German title: Mädchenjahre einer Königin) is a 1954 Austrian historical romantic comedy film directed by Ernst Marischka and starring Romy Schneider, Adrian Hoven and Magda Schneider. It is a remake of the 1936 Erich Engel film Victoria in Dover, which was based on a 1932 play by Sil-Vara. Schneider's performance as a spirited young royal was a lead-in to her best known role in Sissi and its sequels, although Marischka had originally intended to cast Sonja Ziemann as Victoria.

It was shot at the Sievering Studios in Vienna and on location around the city. The film's sets were designed by the art director Fritz Jüptner-Jonstorff.

== Synopsis ==
After her Prime Minister Lord Melbourne arranges a marriage for her with the German Prince Albert, the young Queen Victoria in 19th-century England decides to leave London and spend some time in Kent. While there she meets a handsome young German and falls in love, unaware that he is her intended husband-to-be Albert.

== Cast ==
- Romy Schneider as Princess/Queen Victoria
- Adrian Hoven as Prince Albert of Saxe-Coburg
- Magda Schneider as Baroness Lehzen
- Karl Ludwig Diehl as Lord Melbourne - Prime Minister
- Christl Mardayn as Duchess of Kent
- Paul Hörbiger as Prof. Landmann
- Rudolf Vogel as George, a lackey
- Fred Liewehr as King Leopold of the Belgians
- Alfred Neugebauer as Lord Cunningham
- Otto Treßler as the Archbishop of Canterbury
- Stefan Skodler as Sir John Conroy
- Peter Weck as Prince Henry of Orange
- Rudolf Lenz as Grand Duke Alexander of Russia
- Hans Thimig as the Dean of Chester
- Peter Gerhard as Taglione, a dancing master
- Elisabeth Epp as Lady Flora Hastings
- Hilde Wagener as Lady Littleton
- Helene Lauterböck as Lady Lansdowne
- Eduard Strauss Jr. as Composer
- Viktor Braun

== Bibliography ==
- Fritsche, Maria. Homemade Men in Postwar Austrian Cinema: Nationhood, Genre and Masculinity. Berghahn Books, 2013.
