= Christine (1958 film) =

1958 French period drama film

- Original movie poster
- Directed by: Pierre Gaspard-Huit
- Written by: Pierre Gaspard-Huit; Hans Wilhelm dialogue Georges Neveux
- Based on: play Liebelei (1894) by Arthur Schnitzler
- Produced by: Serge Silberman; Michel Safra
- Starring: Romy Schneider; Alain Delon; Micheline Presle; Jean-Claude Brialy
- Music by: Georges Auric
- Production companies: SpEVA-Films; Play-Art (Paris); Rizzoli Film (Rome)
- Distributed by: Cinédis
- Release date: 1958
- Running time: 100 minutes
- Countries: France; Italy
- Language: French
- Box office: 2,848,858 admissions (France)

Christine is a 1958 French period drama film, based on the 1894 play Liebelei (Flirtation) by Arthur Schnitzler. The film was directed by Pierre Gaspard-Huit and the title character was played by Romy Schneider. The cast included Alain Delon as a young lieutenant.

Schnitzler's play had been filmed in 1933 by Max Ophüls as Liebelei, starring Romy Schneider's mother, Magda Schneider.

== Synopsis ==
In 1906 Vienna, a young lieutenant Franz (Alain Delon) has an affair with a married baroness, Lena. He decides to put an end to it when he meets Christine (Romy Schneider, Delon's fiancée in real life), a musician's daughter.

Christine is almost engaged to a composer, Binder, but falls in love with Franz. Franz breaks it off with Lena, but her husband the Baron Eggesdorf has already discovered the affair.

While Christine and Franz plan their wedding, the Baron challenges Franz to a duel, and Franz is killed, leading to Christine committing suicide.

== Cast ==
- Alain Delon as Franz Lobheiner
- Romy Schneider as Christine Weiring
- Micheline Presle as Baroness Lena
- Sophie Grimaldi as Mizzie
- Fernand Ledoux as Weiring
- Jean-Claude Brialy as Théo Kaiser
- François Chaumette as Wimmer
- Jean Davy as Colonel

== Production ==
Charles Spaak was reported as working on the screenplay.

At the time of filming, Schneider was one of the most popular stars in Europe, having enjoyed success starring in the Sissi film trilogy. Christine was an attempt to duplicate this, being aimed more at the French market.

Delon had only just begun his career when he was cast. He and Schneider began a romantic affair that continued on and off for a number of years.

== Reception ==
In France, the film had 2,848,858 theatre admissions, making it the seventeenth most popular film at the French box office in 1958. Number one in France that year was an American film, The Ten Commandments; number four was another film starring Schneider, the Austrian production Sissi – Fateful Years of an Empress.
