= Wengraf =

Wengraf is a surname. Notable people with the surname include:

- John Wengraf (1897–1974), Austrian actor
- Senta Wengraf (1924–2020), Austrian actress
