= Gustav Knuth =

German actor 1901-1987

- Born: 7 July 1901; Brunswick, German Empire
- Died: 1 February 1987 (aged 85); Zürich, Switzerland
- Occupation: Actor
- Years active: 1935–1982

Gustav Knuth (7 July 1901 – 1 February 1987) was a German film actor. He appeared in more than 120 films between 1935 and 1982 and starred in the TV series Alle meine Tiere. He was married to the actress Elisabeth Lennartz.

== Selected filmography ==
- The Valley of Love (1935) – Hans Stork
- Heimweh (1937) – Christof Peleikis, Fischer und Steuermann
- Shadows Over St. Pauli (1938) – Oschi Rasmus
- The Curtain Falls (1939) – Dr. Cornelsen
- Man for Man (1939) – Walter Zügel
- The Desert Song (1939) – Nic Brenten, Ingenieur
- Between Hamburg and Haiti (1940) – Henry Brinkmann
- The Girl from Fano (1941) – Fischer Frerk
- Friedemann Bach (1941) – Johann Christoph Altnikol
- Pedro Will Hang (1941) – Pedro, Hirte
- The Big Game (1942) – Trainer Karl Wildbrandt
- My Summer Companion (1943) – Georg Polenz, Müller
- Ein glücklicher Mensch (1943) – Georg, sein Sohn
- Große Freiheit Nr. 7 (1944) – Fiete
- Tierarzt Dr. Vlimmen (1944) – Autofahrer
- Das Leben geht weiter (1945) – Dr. Ewald Martens
- Under the Bridges (1946) – Willy
- Journey to Happiness (1948) – Holm, Antiquitätenhändler
- The Secret of the Red Cat (1949) – Pitou
- Tromba (1949) – Ernesto Spadoli, Artist
- Einmaleins der Ehe (1949) – Willy Obermayer
- The Blue Straw Hat (1949) – Caesar von Waldau
- Beloved Liar (1950) – Braubach
- Theodore the Goalkeeper (1950) – Knospe
- A Day Will Come (1950) – Paul
- Land der Sehnsucht (1950)
- Eine Frau mit Herz (1951) – Papi Straßmeier
- Das seltsame Leben des Herrn Bruggs (1951) – Eberhard Bruggs
- The Blue Star of the South (1951) – Bruck
- Palace Hotel (1952) – Loosli, Kellermeister
- That Can Happen to Anyone (1952) – Herr Schwidders
- Der fröhliche Weinberg (1952) – J.B. (Jean Baptiste) Gunderloch
- The Venus of Tivoli (1953) – Hermann Schninkat
- Not Afraid of Big Animals (1953) – Schimmel
- Must We Get Divorced? (1953) – Dr. Spitzkoetter
- The Night Without Morals (1953) – Abruzzo
- The Abduction of the Sabine Women (1954) – Emanuel Striese
- The Mosquito (1954) – Karrari
- On the Reeperbahn at Half Past Midnight (1954) – Brandstetter snr.
- Beloved Enemy (1955) – Soldat Horner
- Reaching for the Stars (1955) – Carlo
- Die Ratten (1955) – Karl John
- Sky Without Stars (1955) – Otto Friese
- Sissi (1955) – Duke Max in Bavaria
- I Often Think of Piroschka (1955) – Istvan Rácz
- 08/15 at Home (1955) – Major Hinrichsen
- Regine (1956) – Der alte Winter
- Hengst Maestoso Austria (1956) – Loisl, Bildhauer und Maler
- My Husband's Getting Married Today (1956) – Karl Nielsen
- If We All Were Angels (1956) – Kommissar
- S'Waisechind vo Engelberg (1956) – Andreas
- Spy for Germany (1956) – Roger Bentley
- Sissi - Die junge Kaiserin (1956) – Duke Max in Bavaria
- The Beggar Student (1956) – Oberst Ollendorf
- The Girl and the Legend (1957) – Carlton Heep
- ...und die Liebe lacht dazu (1957) – Klaus Papendiek
- Das Schloß in Tirol (1957) – Jack Hover
- Der 10. Mai (1957) – deutscher Konsul
- The Count of Luxemburg (1957) – Fürst Basil Basilowitsch
- Sissi - Schicksalsjahre einer Kaiserin (1957) – Duke Max in Bavaria
- Europas neue Musikparade 1958 (1957) – Hellmann
- A Piece of Heaven (1957) – Ludwig von Pröhl
- Man ist nur zweimal jung (1958) – Ruedi Stuffer
- Ihr 106. Geburtstag (1958) – Anton Burger
- Der schwarze Blitz (1958) – Hotelier Haringer
- Hoch klingt der Radetzkymarsch (1958) – Waldemar Graf Hatzberg zu Eberstein
- The House of Three Girls (1958) – Christian Tschöll
- Kleine Leute mal ganz groß (1958) – Ferdinand Sommerrock
- Arena of Fear (1959) – Carl de Vries
- Alle lieben Peter (1959) – Generaldirektor Steiner
- Two Times Adam, One Time Eve (1959) – Viirimäki
- The Buddenbrooks (1959) – Diederich Schwarzkopf
- Freddy unter fremden Sternen (1959) – Henry O'Brien
- I'm Marrying the Director (1960) – Friedrich Kiesberg
- Das kunstseidene Mädchen (1960) – Arthur Grönland
- Kein Engel ist so rein (1960) – Sepp Ziegler
- Stage Fright (1960) – Herr Seipel
- The Man in the Black Derby (1960) – Generaldirektor Meißen
- Conny and Peter Make Music (1960) – Trautmann
- A Woman for Life (1960) – Vater Barnebusch
- Der Teufel hat gut lachen (1960) – Erich Füllgrabe
- You Don't Shoot at Angels (1960) – Carlos
- Sacred Waters (1960) – Der Presi, Hans Waldisch, Wirt zum Bären
- One Prettier Than the Other (1961) – Konsul Otto Seeberg
- Musik ist Trumpf (1961) – Hoteldirektor
- Only the Wind (1961) – Sean O'Connor
- Chikita (1961) – Eugen Stärkle
- The Liar (1961) – Rotbarth
- Alle meine Tiere (1962–1963, TV series, 9 episodes) – Dr. Karl Hofer
- The Nylon Noose (1963) – Charles Clifton
- My Daughter and I (1963) – Dr. Walther
- Die ganze Welt ist himmelblau (1964) – John P. Hoover
- I Learned It from Father (1964) – Theaterdirektor Löwe
- The World Revolves Around You (1964) – Holger Andreesen, Lilians Vater
- The Physicists (1964, TV film) – Herbert Beutler/Isaac Newton
- Legend of a Gunfighter (1964) – Richard Bradley
- Shots in Threequarter Time (1965) – Igor
- Heidi (1965) – Alp-Oehi, Heidi's Grandfather
- Aunt Frieda (1965) – Gustav Schultheiss
- Großer Ring mit Außenschleife (1966, TV film) – Franz Lehmhuhn
- Congress of Love (1966) – Mr. Abonyi, Stefan's father
- Onkel Filser – Allerneueste Lausbubengeschichten (1966) – Gustav Schultheiss
- Großer Mann was nun? (1967–1968, TV series, 8 episodes) – Heinrich König
- Sexy Susan Sins Again (1968) – Mayor
- Salto Mortale (1969–1972, TV series, 18 episodes) – Carlo Doria
- The Brazen Women of Balzac (1969) – Bürgermeister
- Charley's Uncle (1969) – Kapitän Tressblekken / Onkel Reginald Tressblekken
- Pepe, der Paukerschreck – Die Lümmel von der ersten Bank, III. Teil (1969) – Kurt Nietnagel
- Die Powenzbande (1974, TV miniseries) – Baltus Powenz
- Iron Gustav (1979, TV miniseries) – Gustav Hackendahl
- Der Bockerer (1981) – Vater Knabe
