= Karl Fochler =

Austrian actor (1898–1982)

- Born: 23 May 1898; Vienna, Austria-Hungary
- Died: 23 May 1982 (aged 84); Baden, Austria
- Occupation: Actor
- Years active: 1937–1981 (film)

Karl Fochler (23 May 1898–23 May 1982) was an Austrian actor who made over sixty film and television appearances. He featured in a number of stage productions.

== Filmography ==
Year	Title	Role	Notes
1937	Togger	Gast bei Maria de Costa	
1937	Versprich mir nichts!		Uncredited
1938	Yvette	Chevalier Valreali	
1938	You and I	Strumpfwirker	
1939	The Fourth Is Not Coming	Chautin, Kunstmaler	
1940	The Fire Devil	Burron, französischer Offizier	
1940	The Star of Rio		
1940	Trenck the Pandur	Prokop, Oberstleutnant	
1940	Die lustigen Vagabunden	Gendarm	Uncredited
1940	Bismarck	Graf Karolyi	
1941	Kopf hoch, Johannes!	Anstaltsanwalt	
1942	Die heimliche Gräfin	Vicomie de la Croix	
1943	Titanic	Obersteward	Uncredited
1947	Wer küßt wen?	Ladislaus Stiefel, Architekt	
1949	Märchen vom Glück	Theater Director	
1951	Das Herz einer Frau		
1952	Abenteuer im Schloss	Baron von Forstenau	
1952	Hannerl	Kostüm-Designer	
1953	Daughter of the Regiment	Herzog	
1955	Bel Ami		
1955	The Congress Dances		
1955	Sissi	Graf Grünne	
1955	Sonnenschein und Wolkenbruch		
1956	Liebe, die den Kopf verliert	1. Verkäufer	
1956	Sissi – The Young Empress	Graf Grünne	
1957	The Winemaker of Langenlois		
1957	Wie schön, daß es dich gibt		
1957	Sissi – Fateful Years of an Empress	Graf Grünne	
1960	The Good Soldier Schweik	Man	Uncredited
1960	Sooo nicht, meine Herren	Dr. Fasser - Hausarzt	
1961	Schlagerrevue 1962		
1976	Stationschef Fallmerayer	Regierungsrat / Oberstabsarzt Dr. Blau	

== Bibliography ==
- Giesen, Rolf. Nazi Propaganda Films: A History and Filmography. McFarland, 2003.
