= Sarah Biasini =

French actress

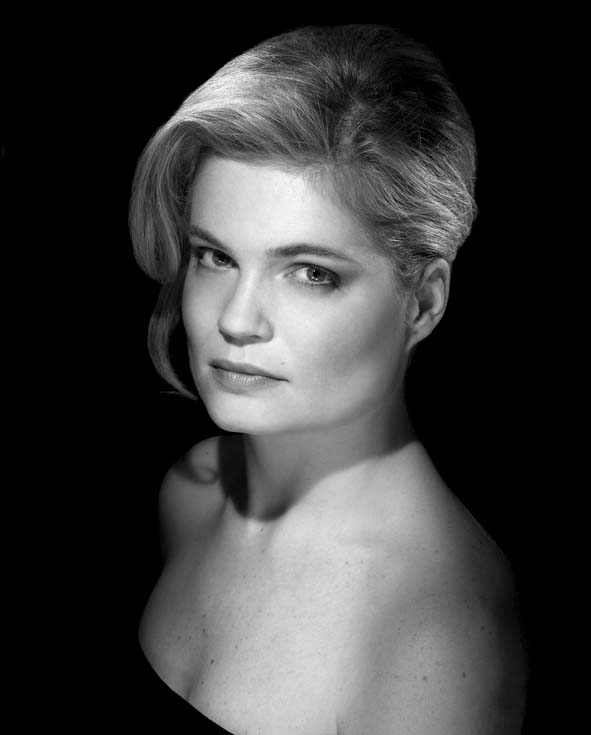
- Biasini in 2008
- Born: Sarah Magdalena Biasini; 21 July 1977 (age 48); Gassin, France
- Occupation: Actress
- Years active: 2004–present
- Partner: Gil Lefeuvre
- Children: 1
- Parent(s): Romy Schneider (mother); Daniel Biasini (father)
- Relatives: Wolf Albach-Retty (grandfather); Magda Schneider (grandmother); Rosa Albach-Retty (great-grandmother)

Sarah Magdalena Biasini (born 21 July 1977) is a French actress, the daughter of actress Romy Schneider and her second husband and former private secretary Daniel Biasini.

== Early life ==
Biasini studied art history at the Sorbonne in Paris and theater at the Lee Strasberg Institute in Los Angeles and the Actors Studio in New York City.

== Career ==
She made her acting debut in 2004, starring in the Emmy-nominated French mini-series Julie, chevalier de Maupin, a swashbuckling adventure story loosely based on the life of the sword-wielding 17th-century opera star Julie d'Aubigny (Mlle. Maupin). In 2005, she made her stage debut in Barefoot in the Park (Pieds nus dans le parc) at the Théâtre Marigny in Paris.

== Autobiography ==
Biasini wrote a book called, La beauté du ciel, which was published in January 2021 and translated the same year into German. The book is based on Biasini's family and her mother.

== Personal life ==
She gave birth to a daughter called Anna on 11 February 2018 with her partner Gil Lefeuvre.

== Selected filmography ==
- Mon petit doigt m'a dit... (2005)
- Nous nous sommes tant haïs ( TV Movie, 2007)
- A Man and His Dog (Un homme et son chien, 2009)
- Associés contre le crime (2012)
- Le Général du roi (TV, 2014)
- Dors mon lapin (2014)
- Couleur locale (TV, 2014)
