= A Man for My Wife =

1943 film

- German: Ein Mann für meine Frau
- Directed by: Hubert Marischka
- Written by: Georg Zoch (play); Albert Roth; Hubert Marischka
- Produced by: Friedrich Wilhelm Gaik
- Starring: Magda Schneider; Johannes Riemann; Clementia Egies
- Cinematography: Günther L. Arko
- Edited by: Margarete Steinborn
- Music by: Werner Bochmann
- Production company: Berlin-Film
- Distributed by: Deutsche Filmvertriebs
- Release date: 26 November 1943
- Running time: 94 minutes
- Country: Germany
- Language: German

A Man for My Wife (German: Ein Mann für meine Frau) is a 1943 German comedy film directed by Hubert Marischka and starring Magda Schneider, Johannes Riemann and Clementia Egies. The film's sets were designed by the art directors Hans Ledersteger and Ernst Richter.

== Cast ==
- Magda Schneider as Dagmar Stollberg
- Johannes Riemann as Robert Stollberg
- Clementia Egies as Manon
- Rolf Weih as Peter Storm
- Hedwig Bleibtreu as Grandmother Stollberg
- Will Dohm as Felix Körner
- Günther Lüders as Fritz Olden
- Hans Brausewetter as Christian Brink
- Erwin Biegel as Onkel Theodor
- Erich Fiedler as Intrusive gentleman
- Herbert Bach as Hansen
- Gerda Scholz-Jürgen as Tante Therese
- Charles Francois as a guest at Grandma's birthday party
- Gerty Godden
- Leo Peukert
- Sonja Gerda Scholz
- Hanns Waschatko
