= Peter Bosse =

German film actor (1931–2018)

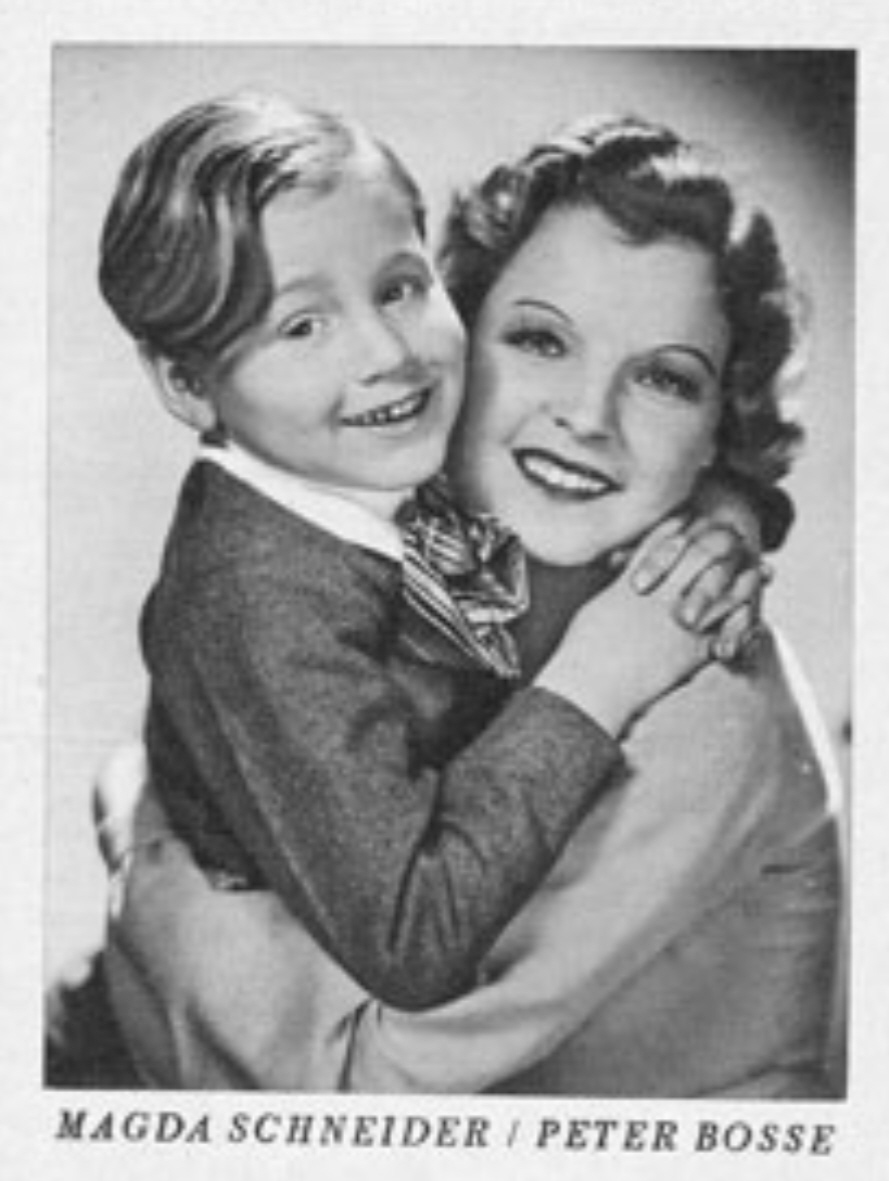
- Bosse with actress Magda Schneider in 1937.
- Born: 15 January 1931; Berlin, Weimar Republic
- Died: 21 September 2018 (aged 87); Berlin, Germany
- Occupation: Actor
- Years active: 1935–1966 (film)
- Spouse: Ilka Bosse
- Mother: Hilde Maroff

Peter Bosse (born Heinrich Peter Friedrich Willi Bosse, 15 January 1931 – 21 September 2018) was a German film actor. The son of actress Hilde Maroff, he appeared as a child actor in a number of Nazi era films during the 1930s. Later he often worked as a narrator in the post-war era.

== Selected filmography ==
- Forget Me Not (1935)
- All Because of the Dog (1936)
- Schlußakkord (1936)
- Mother Song (1937)
- Woman's Love—Woman's Suffering (1937)
- The Woman at the Crossroads (1938)
- Robert and Bertram (1939)

== Bibliography ==
- Waldman, Harry. Nazi Films in America, 1933-1942. McFarland, 2008.
