= Voices of Spring (1952 film) =

1952 film

- Directed by: Hans Thimig
- Written by: Josef Kobliha; Max Mell
- Produced by: Rudolf Dillenz
- Starring: Paul Hörbiger; Hans Jaray; Senta Wengraf
- Cinematography: Herbert Thallmayer
- Edited by: Josef Juvancic
- Music by: Alfred Uhl
- Production company: Dillenz-Film
- Distributed by: Allianz Filmverleih
- Release date: 21 February 1952
- Running time: 94 minutes
- Country: Austria
- Language: German

Voices of Spring (German: Frühlingsstimmen) is a 1952 Austrian musical film directed by Hans Thimig and starring Paul Hörbiger, Hans Jaray and Senta Wengraf. It is part of the operetta film genre. It was shot at the Sievering Studios in Vienna. The film's sets were designed by the art director Felix Smetana.

== Cast ==
- Paul Hörbiger as Lukas, Hausmeister
- Hans Jaray as Rektor der Wiener Sängerknaben
- Senta Wengraf as Grete
- Fritz von Friedl as Hans
- Susi Nicoletti as Rosi
- Christl Mardayn as Madame Hartmann
- Adrienne Gessner as Directrice
- Alma Seidler as Tante Anna Böhm
- Franz Marischka as Egon Pilz, Pianist
- Josef Kepplinger as Kapellmeister Spielmann
- Ilka Windish as Mannequin
- Wiener Sängerknaben as Die Sängerknaben

== Bibliography ==
- James Robert Parish. Film Actors Guide. Scarecrow Press, 1977.
