= Theodore the Goalkeeper =

1950 film

- Directed by: E. W. Emo
- Written by: Günter Schwarz; E. W. Emo; Karl Farkas
- Starring: Theo Lingen; Hans Moser; Josef Meinrad
- Cinematography: Erich Claunigk
- Edited by: Freimut Kalden
- Music by: Werner Bochmann
- Production companies: Styria Film; Zeyn Film
- Distributed by: Herzog Film
- Release date: 29 August 1950
- Running time: 99 minutes
- Countries: Austria; West Germany
- Language: German

Theodore the Goalkeeper (German: Der Theodor im Fußballtor) is a 1950 Austrian-German sports comedy film directed by E. W. Emo and starring Theo Lingen, Hans Moser, and Josef Meinrad. It was shot at the Bavaria Studios in Munich with location shooting at the city's Grünwalder Stadion. The film's sets were designed by the art director Fritz Jüptner-Jonstorff. It was made with the co-operation of the German club 1860 Munich.

== Cast ==
- Theo Lingen as Theo Lubitz
- Hans Moser as Theo Haslinger Sr.
- Josef Meinrad as Theo Haslinger Jr.
- Lucie Englisch as Frau Haslinger
- Gustav Knuth as Knospe
- Charlott Daudert as Charlotte
- Katharina Mayberg as Carola
- Beppo Brem as Emil
- Lia L'Arronge as Emils Frau
- Lotte Lang as Frau Pichler
- Loni Heuser as Frau Bröslmeier
- Rudolf Kiesslich as Otto Prihoda
- Walter Ladengast as Kino-Billeteur
- Berthold Ebbecke as Rundfunk-Ansager
- Sammy Drechsel as Rundfunk-Ansager
- Rudolf Schündler as Choleriker
- Alfons Teuber as Systemspieler
- Luise Franke-Booch as Kundin
- Heinz Beck as Weber, Diener
- Karl Sesta as Trainer bei Favorit
- Harry Hertzsch as Schiedsrichter
- Axel Scholtz as Piccolo

== Bibliography ==
- Bock, Hans-Michael; Bergfelder, Tim, eds. (2009). The Concise Cinegraph: Encyclopaedia of German Cinema. New York: Berghahn Books. ISBN 978-1-57181-655-9.
