= Gertraud Jesserer =

Austrian actress (1943–2021)

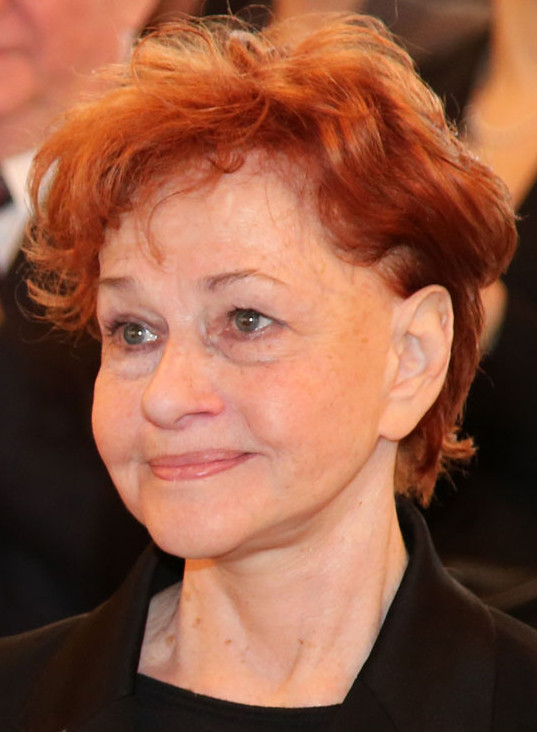
- Jesserer in 2015
- Born: 13 December 1943; Vienna, Alpine and Danube Reichsgaue, Germany
- Died: 9 December 2021 (aged 77); Vienna, Austria
- Occupations: Film and television actor
- Years active: 1959–2019

Gertraud Jesserer (13 December 1943 – 9 December 2021) was an Austrian film and television actress. Jesserer was the wife of German actor Peter Vogel and the mother of actor-journalist Nikolas Vogel. She died in a house fire in Vienna on 9 December 2021, at the age of 77.

== Selected filmography ==
- Eva (1958)
- The Inheritance of Bjorndal (1960)
- The Cry of the Wild Geese (1961)
- My Daughter and I (1963)
- Condemned to Sin (1964)
- I Learned It from Father (1964)
- Merry-Go-Round (1973)
- Attempted Flight (1976)
- Lamorte (1997)
- Debt of Love (1997)
- Baby Rex - Der kleine Kommissar (1997)
- Germanija (2002)
- Soundless (2004)
- Il Commissario Rex (2008–2011)
