= Don Juan (1955 film) =

- Directed by: Walter Kolm-Veltée
- Written by: Lorenzo da Ponte (libretto); Ernst Henthaler; Walter Kolm-Veltée; Alfred Uhl
- Produced by: Walter Kolm-Veltée
- Starring: Cesare Danova; Josef Meinrad; Evelyn Cormand
- Cinematography: Hannes Fuchs; Willi Sohm
- Edited by: Walter Kolm-Veltée
- Music by: Wolfgang Amadeus Mozart
- Production company: Akkord-Film
- Release date: 12 August 1955
- Running time: 89 minutes
- Country: Austria
- Language: German

Don Juan is a 1955 Austrian musical film directed by Walter Kolm-Veltée and starring Cesare Danova, Josef Meinrad and Evelyn Cormand. It is an adaptation of the 1787 Mozart opera Don Giovanni.

The film was shot in the Soviet-controlled Rosenhügel Studios in Vienna.

== Cast ==
- Cesare Danova as Don Giovanni
- Josef Meinrad as Leporello
- Evelyn Cormand as Zerlina
- Hans von Borsody as Masetto
- Lotte Tobisch as Donna Elvira
- Jean Vinci as Don Ottavio
- Marianne Schönauer as Donna Anna
- Fred Hennings as Commendatore
- Senta Wengraf as Elvira's Maid
- Walter Berry as Masetto (singing voice)
- Anny Felbermayer as Zerlina / Donna Anna (singing voice)
- Gottlob Frick as Commendatore (singing voice)
- Helmut Krauss
- Hanna Löser as Donna Elvira (singing voice)
- Hugo Meyer-Welfing as Don Ottavio (singing voice)
- Alfred Poell as Don Giovanni (singing voice)
- Harald Progelhof as Leporello (singing voice)

== Bibliography ==
- Davidson, John & Hake, Sabine. Framing the Fifties: Cinema in a Divided Germany. Berghahn Books, 2007.
