= Anton Profes =

Austrian musician (1896–1976)

- Born: 26 March 1896; Leitmeritz, Bohemia, Austro-Hungarian Empire
- Died: 22 August 1976 (aged 80); Salzburg, Austria
- Occupation: Composer
- Years active: 1930–1962 (film)

Anton Profes (1896–1976) was an Austrian composer.

== Selected filmography ==
- A Thousand Words of German (1930)
- Josef the Chaste (1930)
- Suburban Cabaret (1935)
- The Eternal Mask (1935)
- Hannerl and Her Lovers (1936)
- The Postman from Longjumeau (1936)
- The Empress's Favourite (1936)
- Talking About Jacqueline (1937)
- Secret Mission (1938)
- Linen from Ireland (1939)
- The Eternal Spring (1940)
- Everything for Gloria (1941)
- Destiny (1942)
- The White Dream (1943)
- Dog Days (1944)
- The Queen of the Landstrasse (1948)
- Maresi (1948)
- Vagabonds (1949)
- Your Heart Is My Homeland (1953)
- Grandstand for General Staff (1953)
- Victoria in Dover (1954)
- The Red Prince (1954)
- I Know What I'm Living For (1955)
- Sissi (1955)
- Sissi – The Young Empress (1956)
- Sissi – Fateful Years of an Empress (1957)
- Gustav Adolf's Page (1960)

== Bibliography ==
- Robert von Dassanowsky. Austrian Cinema: A History. McFarland, 2005.
