= Eva (1958 film) =

1958 film

- Film poster
- Directed by: Rolf Thiele
- Written by: Hans Jacoby; Fritz Rotter
- Produced by: Karl Ehrlich
- Starring: Romy Schneider
- Cinematography: Klaus von Rautenfeld
- Edited by: Henny Brünsch
- Distributed by: UFA
- Release date: 1958
- Running time: 92 minutes
- Country: Austria
- Language: German

Eva (German: Die Halbzarte) is a 1958 Austrian comedy film directed by Rolf Thiele. It was entered into the 1959 Cannes Film Festival.

== Cast ==
- Romy Schneider as Nicole
- Carlos Thompson as Irving
- Magda Schneider as Dassou
- Gertraud Jesserer as Brigitte
- Alfred Costas as Thomas
- Richard Eybner (as Richard Eÿbner)
- Rudolf Forster
- Fritz Heller
- Benno Hoffmann
- Helmuth Lohner
- Erni Mangold
- Josef Meinrad
- Dorothea Neff
- Guido Wieland
