= Alle meine Tiere =

German television series

- Also known as: All My Animals
- Written by: Heinz Oskar Wuttig
- Country of origin: Germany

Original release
- Release: 1962 – 1963

Alle meine Tiere (All My Animals) was a nine-part German family television series about a veterinary practice in the Black Forest which was broadcast on ARD between 1962 and 1963. The main character, the veterinarian, was played by Gustav Knuth.

== See also ==
- List of German television series
