= Overnight Sensation (film) =

1932 film directed by Max Neufeld

- Directed by: Max Neufeld
- Written by: Herbert Rosenfeld
- Produced by: Herman Millakowsky
- Starring: Magda Schneider; Hermann Thimig; S. Z. Sakall
- Cinematography: Heinrich Gärtner
- Edited by: W. L. Bagier
- Music by: Paul Abraham
- Production company: Hermann Millakowsky Film
- Distributed by: Deutsche Universal-Film
- Release date: 25 December 1932
- Running time: 100 minutes
- Country: Germany
- Language: German

Overnight Sensation or Overnight Happiness (German: Glück über Nacht) is a 1932 German comedy film directed by Max Neufeld and starring Magda Schneider, Hermann Thimig, and S. Z. Sakall.

The film's sets were designed by the art director Max Heilbronner. It was shot at the Grunewald Studios in Berlin and on location in Locarno. It was distributed by the German branch of Universal Pictures.

== Synopsis ==
An inventor working on the development of a rocket enlists the help of a young woman he meets during the titular night to help him persuade a financier to back his scheme.

== Cast ==
- Magda Schneider as Edith
- Hermann Thimig as Robert
- S. Z. Sakall as Haase
- Anni Markart as Mary Schwab
- Hans Junkermann as Marys Vater
- Julius Falkenstein as Großvater Schwab
- Paul Otto as Onkel Jim
- Kurt Fuß as Nachtredakteur
- Wolfgang Klein as Charlie
- Anneliese Dobat
- Else Schönborn
- Erich Fiedler
- Hans Lipschütz
- Erich Dunskus
- Heinz Wemper
- Alfred Martins

== Bibliography ==
- Parish, James Robert (1977). Film Actors Guide: Western Europe. Metuchen, NJ: Scarecrow Press. ISBN 978-0-8108-1044-0.
