= Forget Me Not (1935 film) =

1935 German drama film

- Directed by: Augusto Genina
- Written by: Ernst Marischka
- Produced by: Alberto Giacalone
- Starring: Beniamino Gigli; Peter Bosse; Kurt Vespermann; Magda Schneider
- Cinematography: Herbert Körner; Bruno Timm
- Edited by: Carl Otto Bartning
- Music by: Alois Melichar
- Production company: Itala-Film
- Distributed by: Neue Deutsch Lichtspiel-Syndikat Verleih
- Release date: 24 October 1935
- Country: Germany
- Language: German

Forget Me Not (German: Vergiss mein nicht) is a 1935 German drama film directed by Augusto Genina and starring Beniamino Gigli, Peter Bosse and Kurt Vespermann. The rights to the film were bought by Alexander Korda who remade it in Britain the following year.

== Main cast ==
- Beniamino Gigli as Enzo Curti - tenor Scala of Milano
- Peter Bosse as Benvenuto - His son
- Kurt Vespermann as Ernst Mülmann - Curtis Impresario
- F.W. Schröder-Schrom as Geheimrat von Berneck
- Magda Schneider as Liselotte Heßfeld - seine Sekretärin
- Siegfried Schürenberg as Hellmut von Ahrens - Erster Offizier
- Erik Ode as Peter Petermann, Dritter Offizier
- Hedda Bjornson as Irene Hart
- Zoya Valevskaya as Olga

== General bibliography ==
- Kulik, Karol. Alexander Korda: The Man Who Could Work Miracles.(registration required) Virgin Books, 1990.
