= Mother Song =

1937 film directed by Carmine Gallone

- Directed by: Carmine Gallone
- Written by: Aldo De Benedetti; Leonhard Fürst; Bernd Hofmann; Philipp Lothar Mayring; Iva Raffay; Ernst Günter Techow; Thea von Harbou
- Produced by: Ferruccio Biancini; Alberto Giacalone
- Starring: Beniamino Gigli; Maria Cebotari; Hans Moser
- Cinematography: Georg Bruckbauer; Massimo Terzano
- Edited by: Oswald Hafenrichter; Giorgio Simonelli
- Music by: Cesare A. Bixio; Alois Melichar
- Production company: Itala Film
- Distributed by: Tobis Film; Generalcine
- Release date: 21 December 1937
- Running time: 93 minutes
- Countries: Germany; Italy
- Language: German

Mother Song (German: Mutterlied) is a 1937 German-Italian musical drama film directed by Carmine Gallone and starring Beniamino Gigli, Maria Cebotari and Hans Moser. It was produced by Itala Film, a Berlin-based production company with strong links to Italy.

It was shot at the Cinecittà Studios in Rome and on location in Pisa. The film's sets were designed by the art directors Gabriel Pellon, Giorgio Pinzauti, Ernst Richter and Heinrich Richter.

== Cast ==
- Beniamino Gigli as Ettore Vanni
- Maria Cebotari as Fiamma Vanni - seine Frau
- Peter Bosse as Mario - sein Sohn
- Hans Moser as Giulio Stückelmeier
- Michael Bohnen as Cesare Doret
- Hilde Hildebrand as Ricarda Doret, seine Frau
- Alfred Gerasch as Intendant
- Josef Dahmen as Inspizient
- Werner Pledath as Arzt
- Hilde Maroff as Krankenschwester
- Herbert Gernot as Lawyer
- Rio Nobile as Chauffeur
- Max Paetz as Garderobier

== Bibliography ==
- Waldman, Harry. Nazi Films in America, 1933–1942. McFarland, 2008.
