= Herbert Strabel =

German production designer

- Born: 14 October 1927; Berlin, Germany
- Died: 21 October 2017 (aged 90); Holzkirchen, Germany
- Occupations: Production designer Art director Set decorator
- Years active: 1957-1985

Herbert Strabel (14 October 1927 – 21 October 2017) was a German production designer, art director and set decorator. He won an Academy Award in the category Best Art Direction for the film Cabaret. He died a week after his 90th birthday.

== Selected filmography ==
- Murder Party (1961)
- My Daughter and I (1963)
- I Learned It from Father (1964)
- The Duck Rings at Half Past Seven (1968)
- Cabaret (1972)

== See also ==
- List of German-speaking Academy Award winners and nominees
