= My Daughter and I =

1963 film

- Directed by: Thomas Engel
- Written by: Curth Flatow
- Produced by: Claus Hardt; Utz Utermann
- Starring: Heinz Rühmann; Gustav Knuth; Gertraud Jesserer
- Cinematography: Erich Claunigk
- Edited by: Walter Boos
- Music by: Franz Grothe
- Production company: Divina Film
- Distributed by: Gloria Film
- Release date: 16 August 1963
- Running time: 90 minutes
- Country: West Germany
- Language: German

My Daughter and I (German: Meine Tochter und ich) is a 1963 West German comedy film directed by Thomas Engel and starring Heinz Rühmann, Gustav Knuth and Gertraud Jesserer.

It was shot at the Bavaria Studios in Munich. The film's sets were designed by the art directors Rolf Zehetbauer and Herbert Strabel.

== Cast ==
- Heinz Rühmann as Dr. Robert Stegemann
- Gustav Knuth as Dr. Walther
- Gertraud Jesserer as Biggi
- Eckart Dux as Jochen Siebert
- Agnes Windeck as Frau Winkler
- Herta Saal as Frau Brenner
- Christiane Nielsen as Marion
- Heinz Schubert as Detektiv

== Bibliography ==
- Körner, Torsten. Der kleine Mann als Star: Heinz Rühmann und seine Filme der 50er Jahre. Campus Verlag, 2001.
