= Vilma Degischer =

Austrian actress

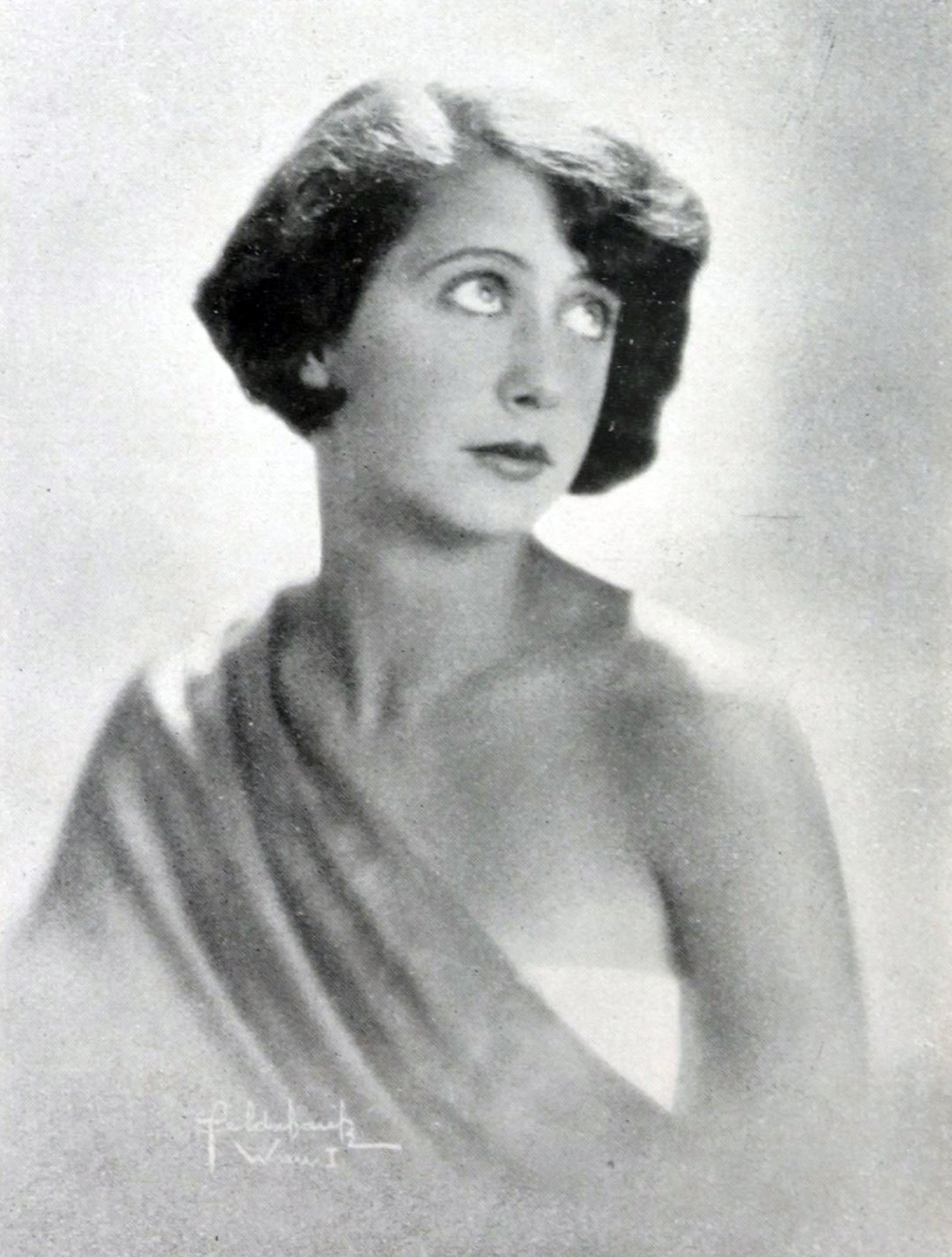
- Vilma Degischer in 1927
- Born: 17 November 1911; Vienna, Austria-Hungary
- Died: 3 May 1992 (aged 80); Baden bei Wien, Austria
- Occupation: Actress
- Years active: 1931-1991
- Spouse: Hermann Thimig

Vilma Degischer (17 November 1911 – 3 May 1992) was an Austrian theatre and film actress. She appeared in more than thirty films from 1931 to 1991. From 1931 to 1991 she played at the Theater in der Josefstadt in Vienna.

== Early life ==
After she attended school she had originally wanted to be a dancer, and had been taught by Gertrud Bodenwieser. Only then did she discover she had a talent for acting.

== Filmography ==
Film
Year	Title	Role	Notes
1931	Die große Liebe		
1948	The Other Life	Suzette Alberti	
1949	Dear Friend	Susanne Berger, Sekretärin	
1951	Gateway to Peace	Elisabeth Dressler	
1954	Der Komödiant von Wien	Katharina Schratt	
1955	Sissi	Princess Sophie of Bavaria	
1956	Sissi – The Young Empress	Princess Sophie of Bavaria	
1957	...und die Liebe lacht dazu	Besitzerin des Schloßhotels	
1957	Sissi – Fateful Years of an Empress	Princess Sophie of Bavaria	
1958	Embezzled Heaven	Livia Argan	
1963	Is Geraldine an Angel?	Tante Klara	
1963	The Cardinal	Sister Wilhelmina	
1963	The Waltz King	Mama Strauss	
1965	Uncle Tom's Cabin	Mrs. Shelby	
1988	Trostgasse 7 - eine Kindheit in Wien 1934-1938	Großmutter Wirth	
1991	The Strauss Dynasty	Old dancer	
