= Woman's Love—Woman's Suffering =

1937 film directed by Augusto Genina

Woman's Love-Woman's Suffering
- Directed by: Augusto Genina
- Written by: Augusto Genina
- Starring: Magda Schneider; Iván Petrovich; Oskar Sima; Anton Pointner
- Cinematography: Herbert Körner
- Edited by: Waldemar Gaede
- Music by: Peter Kreuder
- Production company: Cine-Allianz Tonfilm
- Distributed by: Tobis-Sascha Film (Austria)
- Release date: 19 February 1937
- Running time: 99 minutes
- Country: Germany
- Language: German

Woman's Love—Woman's Suffering (German: Frauenliebe - Frauenleid) is a 1937 German drama film directed by Augusto Genina and starring Magda Schneider, Iván Petrovich and Oskar Sima.

== Cast ==
- Magda Schneider as Marie Haßler
- Iván Petrovich as Hans Martenrood
- Oskar Sima as Toni Huber
- Anton Pointner as Kriminalkommissar Düring
- Peter Bosse as Peter
- Ernst Behmer as Diener Johnson
- Anda Bori as Kitty Astor
- Heinrich Schroth as Oberarzt
- Maria Seidler as Krankenschwester
- Anita Mey as Die Gnädige
- Philipp Manning as Butler
- Erich Fiedler as Diener
- Gerhard Dammann as Hotelbesitzer
- Erich Kestin as Nachtportier
- Alexa von Porembsky as Frieda, Zimmermädchen
- Margarete Kupfer as Portierfrau
- Else Bötticher as Frau Mengel
- Claire Reigbert as Frau Brandner
- Eduard Bornträger as Direktor des Konzertsaals
- Maria Krahn as Ältere Frau
- Karl Harbacher as Älterer Herr
- Lilo Bergen as Junges Mädchen
- Erich Dunskus as Kassierer Müller
- Ursula Deinert as Tänzerin
- Walther Thiele as Konzertpianist
- Tina Zucchi

== Bibliography ==
- Hake, Sabine. Popular Cinema of the Third Reich. University of Texas Press, 2001.
