= I Learned It from Father =

1964 film

- Directed by: Axel von Ambesser
- Written by: Kurt Nachmann
- Produced by: Karl Spiehs; Kurt Ulrich
- Starring: Willy Fritsch; Thomas Fritsch; Gertraud Jesserer
- Cinematography: Hanns Matula
- Edited by: Hermine Diethelm
- Music by: Johannes Fehring
- Production companies: Berolina Film; Wiener Stadthalle-Station Betriebs-und Produktionsgesellschaft
- Distributed by: Nora Film
- Release date: 28 August 1964
- Running time: 94 minutes
- Countries: Austria; West Germany
- Language: German

I Learned It from Father (German: Das hab ich von Papa gelernt) is a 1964 Austrian-West German comedy film directed by Axel von Ambesser and starring Willy Fritsch, Thomas Fritsch and Gertraud Jesserer. It was shot at the Rosenhügel Studios in Vienna The film's sets were designed by the art directors Herbert Strabel and Rolf Zehetbauer. It was the final film of Willy Fritsch, whose career stretched back to the silent era.

== Synopsis ==
The son of a respectable industrialist leads a wild second life.

== Cast ==
- Willy Fritsch as Clemens Andermann
- Thomas Fritsch as Andreas Andermann
- Gertraud Jesserer as Monika Holl
- Peter Vogel as Oskar Werner Vischer
- Marianne Chappuis as Christa Seebald
- Barbara Stanyk as Ebba Pedersen
- Paul Hörbiger as Julius Knackert
- Peter Matic as Joachim Lange
- Franz Stoss as Sebastian Delt
- Fritz Muliar as Hans Sax
- Ljuba Welitsch as Managerin Neumann
- Susi Nicoletti as Dora Bauer
- Marianne Schönauer as Therese
- Guido Wieland as Bankdirektor
- Karl Böhm as Tettelmann

== Bibliography ==
- Schmidl, Stefan & Jaroš, Monika. Swingin' Cinema; Die Filmmusik von Johannes Fehring. Hollitzer Wissenschaftsverlag, 2025.
