= Eduardo Palassin Guinle =

Brazilian businessman (1846–1912)

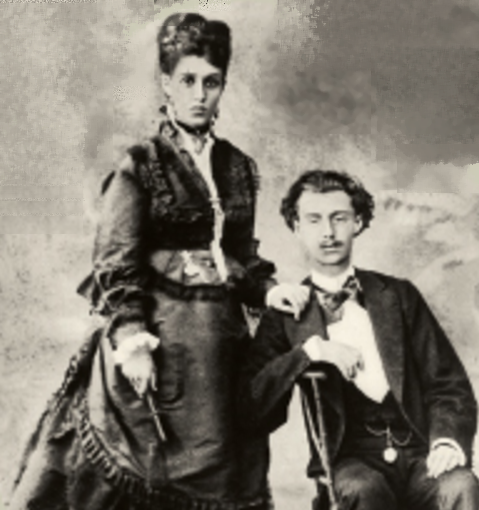
- Guinle with his wife
- Born: 18 March 1846; Porto Alegre, Rio Grande do Sul, Brazil
- Died: 10 March 1912 (aged 65); Rio de Janeiro, Brazil
- Occupation: businessperson
- Known for: Companhia Docas de Santos
- Spouse: Guilhermina Coutinho da Silva
- Parents: Jean-Arnauld Guinle (father); Josephine Désirée Bernardine Palassin (mother)

Eduardo Pallasim Guinle (Porto Alegre, 18 March 1846 – Rio de Janeiro, 10 March 1912) was a Brazilian businessman and the patriarch of the Guinle family.

== Origin ==
Eduardo was the son of Jean-Arnauld Guinle and Josephine Désirée Bernardine Palassin, who were French immigrants from the region of the Hautes-Pyrénées who immigrated to Uruguay and then to Brazil.

== Companhia Docas de Santos ==
In 1888, the businessmen Eduardo Palassin Guinle, Francisco de Paula Ribeiro and Cândido Gaffrée received a 92-year concession to the port of Santos from Isabel, Princess Imperial of Brazil, where they founded the Companhia Docas de Santos during the golden age of coffees exports in Brazil.

When he died in 1912, Eduardo Pallasim Guinle left an estimated fortune of 20 billion dollars in today's money.

== Legacy ==
There is a road named after him in Botafogo, Rio de Janeiro. There is also a road with the name of his wife (Rua Guilhermina Guinle) and a bust dedicated to Eduardo in Copacabana Palace.
