= Jorge Guinle =

Brazilian businessman (1916–2004)

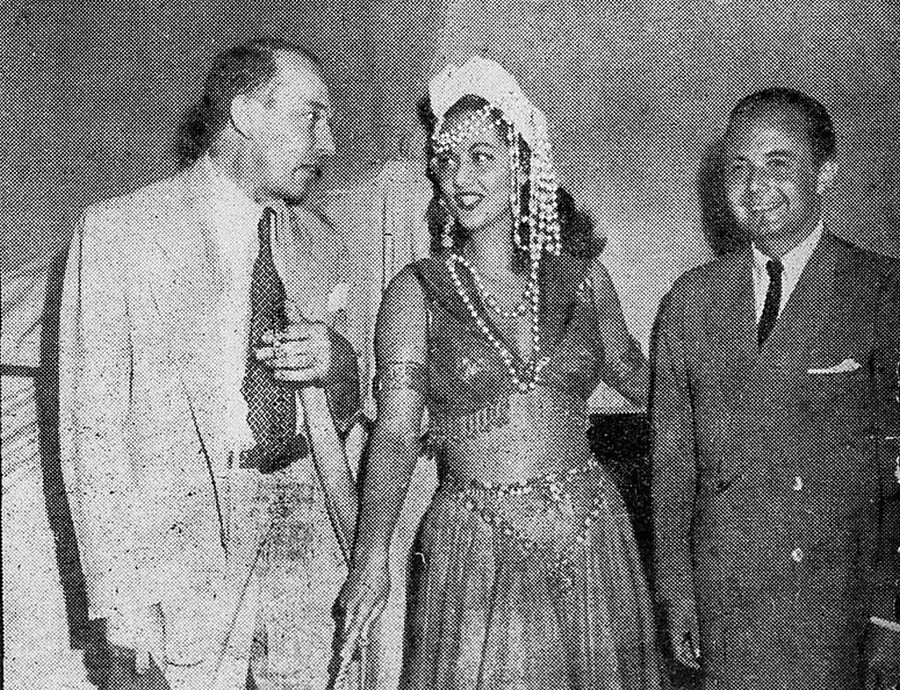
- Raul Bopp, Maria Montez, and Guinle in 1943
- Born: Jorge Eduardo Guinle; 5 February 1916; Petrópolis, Rio de Janeiro, Brazil
- Died: 5 March 2004 (aged 88); Rio de Janeiro, Rio de Janeiro State, Brazil

Jorge Eduardo Guinle (5 February 1916 – 5 March 2004), also known as Jorginho Guinle, was a Brazilian billionaire tycoon from the Guinle family of Rio, Brazil.

He was born in Petrópolis, Rio de Janeiro on 5 February 1916.

He was known as one of the richest men on earth, a jazz enthusiast and the "last tycoon playboy".

He was romantically associated with numerous stars including Marilyn Monroe, Anita Ekberg, Romy Schneider, Hedy Lamarr, Ava Gardner, Rita Hayworth, Jayne Mansfield, Susan Hayward, Carole Landis, and Linda Christian. He came from the Plassin-Guinle family, a wealthy French-Brazilian family with ties to the Port of Santos and Copacabana Palace hotel.

Guinle died on 5 March 2004 in Rio de Janeiro.
