= César and Rosalie =

- Film poster
- French: César et Rosalie
- Directed by: Claude Sautet
- Written by: Jean-Loup Dabadie; Claude Sautet
- Produced by: Michelle de Broca
- Starring: Yves Montand; Romy Schneider; Sami Frey; Eva Maria Meineke; Henri-Jacques Huet; Herve Sand; Isabelle Huppert; Gisella Hahn; Bernard Le Coq; Umberto Orsini
- Cinematography: Jean Boffety
- Music by: Philippe Sarde
- Production companies: Fildebroc-UPF; Mega Film; Paramount-Orion Film Production
- Distributed by: Cinema International Corporation
- Release date: 27 October 1972
- Running time: 107 minutes
- Countries: France; Germany; Italy
- Language: French

César and Rosalie (French: César et Rosalie) is a 1972 romance film starring Yves Montand and Romy Schneider, directed by Claude Sautet.

== Plot ==
In Paris the beautiful divorcée Rosalie spends time with César, a coarse but good-hearted scrap merchant. At a wedding she sees her first love David, a shy graphic artist. Despite the efforts of César to stifle the renewed relationship, David and Rosalie run away to Sète on the Mediterranean. Distraught at being abandoned, César tracks them down and offers Rosalie her family's old holiday home on the island of Noirmoutier in the Atlantic, which he has bought. She accepts and all her family come to spend the summer there, but she falls into depression. In an effort to rally her, César goes to find David and persuades him to join them. This well-intentioned ploy backfires because Rosalie then runs away. Left together, the two rivals become good friends. A year later they are enjoying lunch when a taxi draws up and out steps Rosalie.

== Cast ==
- Yves Montand - César
- Romy Schneider - Rosalie
- Sami Frey - David
- Bernard Le Coq - Michel
- Eva Maria Meineke - Lucie Artigues
- Henri-Jacques Huet - Marcel
- Isabelle Huppert - Marite
- Gisela Hahn - Carla
- Betty Beckers - Madeleine
- Hervé Sand - Georges
- Jacques Dhéry - Henri Harrieu
- Pippo Merisi - Albert
- Carlo Nell - Jérôme
- Dimitri Petricenko - Simon

== Reception ==
The film sold 2,577,865 tickets in France, and was the 11th most watched film of 1972.

Roger Ebert said it is "too pleasing a movie not to review", and remarked "it’s the sort of thing the French, with their appreciation for the awesome complexities of a simple thing like love, do especially well." TV Guide called it an "intelligent and funny romance", and added "what makes the film... worth watching is the interplay among Montand, Schneider, and Frey." The New York Times compared it to "exposure to very good, even subtle, table manners—impressive but not too involving", and said the film "generally remains on the surface... like the type of slick magazine fiction to which it belongs." Time Out was also skeptical, saying that the film "is saved from colour supplement chic only by sympathetic performances from Schneider and Montand."

== See also ==
- Isabelle Huppert on screen and stage
