= The Girl and the Legend =

1957 film

- German: Robinson soll nicht sterben
- Directed by: Josef von Báky
- Written by: Friedrich Forster (play); Johannes Mario Simmel; Emil Burri
- Starring: Romy Schneider; Horst Buchholz
- Cinematography: Günther Anders
- Music by: Georg Haentzschel
- Production company: Neue Deutsche Filmgesellschaft
- Distributed by: Herzog Film
- Release date: 7 February 1957
- Running time: 97 minutes
- Country: West Germany
- Language: German

The Girl and the Legend (German: Robinson soll nicht sterben) is a 1957 German historical drama film directed by Josef von Báky and starring Romy Schneider, Horst Buchholz and Erich Ponto. It was shot at the Bavaria Studios in Munich. The film's sets were designed by the art director Hein Heckroth.

== Cast ==
- Romy Schneider as Maud
- Horst Buchholz as Tom
- Erich Ponto as Daniel Defoe
- Mathias Wieman as King George II
- Magda Schneider as Mrs. Cantley
- Gustav Knuth as Carlton Heep
- Rudolf Vogel as Mr. Herodes Pum
- Elisabeth Flickenschildt as Miss Hackett
- Günther Lüders as Mr. Drinkwater
- Heinrich Gretler as Mr. Wilde
- Roland Kaiser as Ben
- Wolfgang Condrus as Charly
- Urs Hess as Jim
- Gert Fröbe as Mr. Gillis

== Bibliography ==
- Petzel, Michael. Die junge Romy: Reifezeit eines Stars. Schwarzkopf & Schwarzkopf, 2002.
