= Senta Wengraf =

Austrian actress (1924–2020)

- Born: Senta Michaela Irene Wengraf; 10 May 1924; Vienna, Austria
- Died: 6 December 2020 (aged 96)
- Occupation: Actress
- Years active: 1946– ?

Senta Wengraf (10 May 1924 – 6 December 2020) was an Austrian film and television actress.

== Selected filmography ==
- Two Times Lotte (1950)
- Voices of Spring (1952)
- The Spendthrift (1953)
- Franz Schubert (1953)
- Don Juan (1955)
- Sissi – The Young Empress (1956)
- Kaiserjäger (1956)
- Sissi – Fateful Years of an Empress (1957)
- Scandal in Bad Ischl (1957)
- One Should Be Twenty Again (1958)
- When the Bells Sound Clearly (1959)

== Bibliography ==
- Fritsche, Maria. Homemade Men in Postwar Austrian Cinema: Nationhood, Genre and Masculinity. Berghahn Books, 2013.
