= Magda Schneider =

German actress (1909–1996)

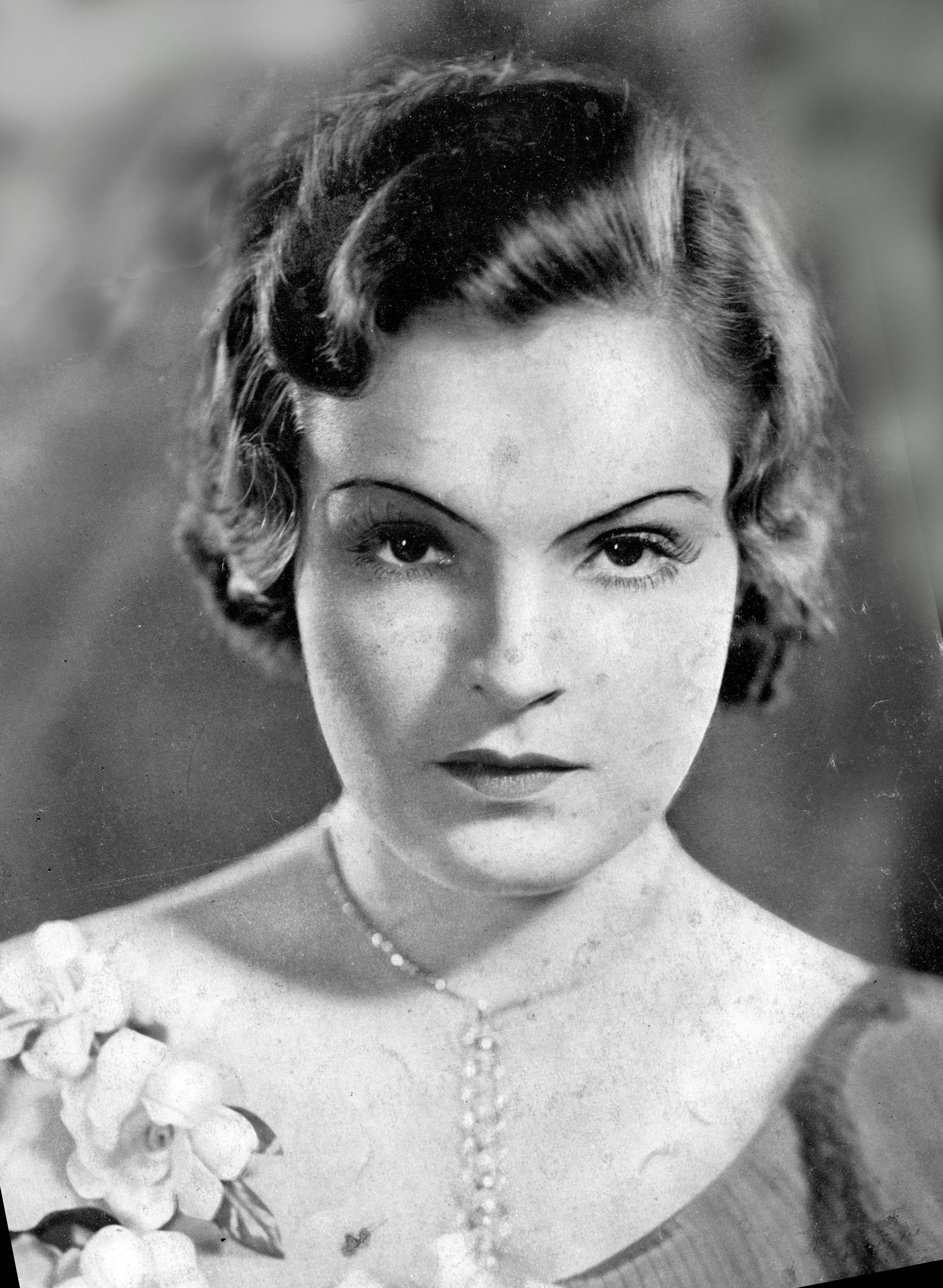
- Schneider in 1935
- Born: Magdalena Maria Schneider; 17 May 1909; Augsburg, Kingdom of Bavaria, German Empire
- Died: 30 July 1996 (aged 87); Schönau am Königssee, Bavaria, Germany
- Occupation: Actress
- Spouses: Wolf Albach-Retty (m. 1937; div. 1945) Hans Herbert Blatzheim (m. 1953; died 1968) Horst Fehlhaber (m. 1982)
- Children: 2, including Romy Schneider

Magdalena Maria Schneider (17 May 1909 – 30 July 1996) was a German actress and singer. She was the mother of the actress Romy Schneider.

== Biography ==
Magdalena Maria Schneider was born in Augsburg, Bavaria, the daughter of a plumber. She attended a Catholic girls' school and a commercial college; thereafter she worked as a stenographer in a grain store. At the same time, Schneider studied singing at the Leopold Mozart Conservatory in Augsburg and ballet at the municipal theater. She made her stage debut at the Staatstheater am Gärtnerplatz in Munich. Schneider drew the attention of the Austrian director Ernst Marischka who called her to the Theater an der Wien in Vienna, and in 1930 gave Schneider her first film role.

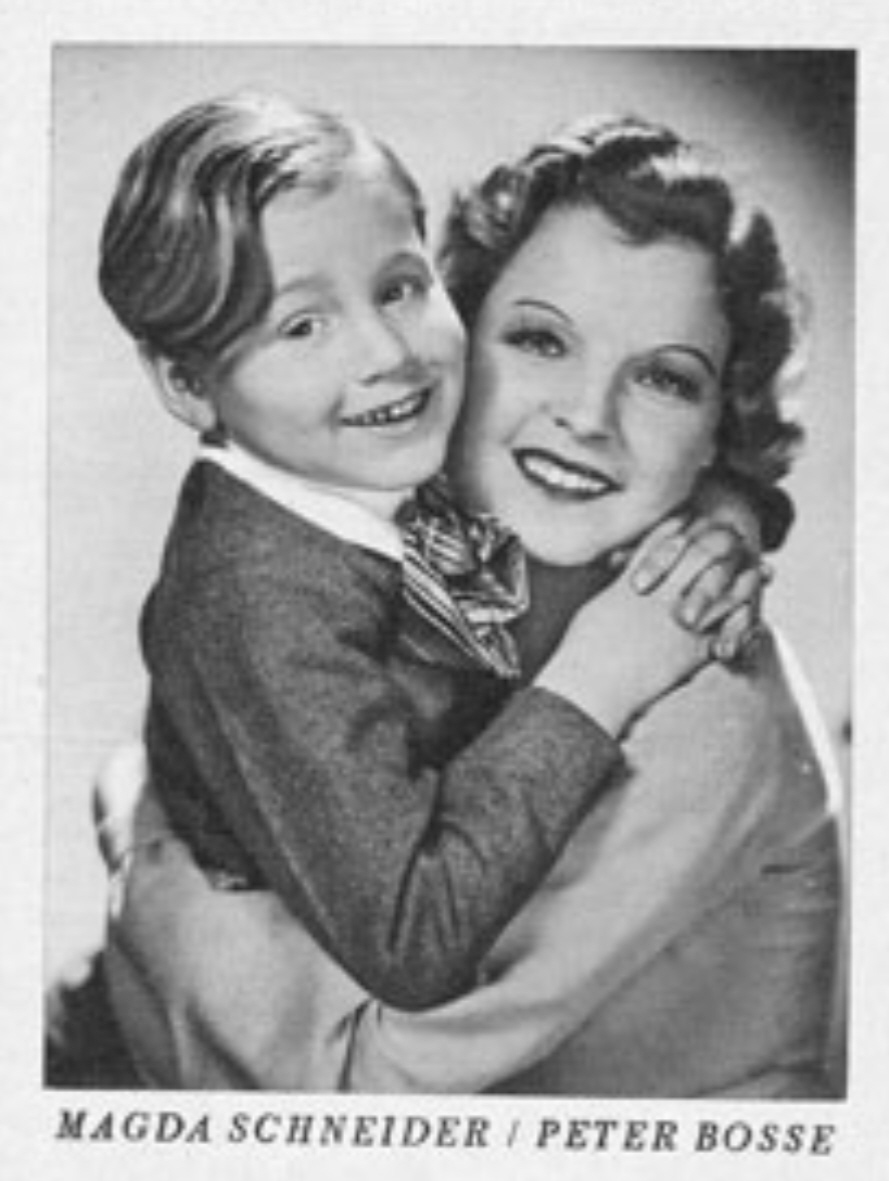
Schneider with Peter Bosse in 1937

While filming in 1933, Schneider met her future husband, the Austrian actor Wolf Albach-Retty. The couple married in 1937 and had two children: Rosemarie Magdalena, called Romy, and Wolf-Dieter, later a surgeon, born in 1941. During World War II, Schneider lived in the Bavarian Alps near Hitler's retreat in the Obersalzberg above Berchtesgaden. Schneider was a guest of Hitler's, who declared that she was his favorite actress. Later she and Albach-Retty separated and the marriage ended in divorce in 1945.

After the war, offers for movies initially were few. Schneider again began filming in 1948 and promoted her daughter's career with the joint appearance in the film When the White Lilacs Bloom Again (1953) directed by Hans Deppe, a typical 1950s Heimatfilm which was the film debut of her daughter, 14-year-old Romy Schneider. In the same year Magda Schneider married the Cologne restaurant owner Hans Herbert Blatzheim.

Magda Schneider arranged further appearances with her daughter in several movies such as Mädchenjahre einer Königin (Victoria in Dover, 1954), the films of the Sissi trilogy based on the life of Empress Elisabeth of Austria, with Romy Schneider starring in the title role and Magda Schneider playing the role of her mother Princess Ludovika of Bavaria, and in Die Halbzarte (Eva, 1958). Magda Schneider's role in the 1933 film Liebelei (1933) was also played by her daughter, Romy Schneider, in the remake Christine (1958).

Schneider died in 1996 at her house in Schönau near Berchtesgaden, Bavaria.

== Selected filmography ==
- Boycott (1930) – Zofe
- Wrong Number, Miss (1932) – Inge Becker – Telefonistin
- A Bit of Love (1932) – Anny, seine Sekretärin
- Two in a Car (1932) – Lisa Krüger
- The Song of Night (1932) – Mathilde
- Sehnsucht 202 (1932) – Magda
- Tell Me Tonight (1932) – Mathilde Pategg
- The Testament of Cornelius Gulden (1932) – Flox Winter
- Overnight Sensation (1932) – Edith
- One Night's Song (1933) – Mathilde
- Marion, That's Not Nice (1933) – Marion – Satorius Tochter
- Liebelei (1933) – Christine Weyring – seine Tochter
- A Love Story (1933) – Christine Weyring
- Kind, ich freu' mich auf Dein Kommen (1933) – Lili Schrader
- Going Gay (1933) – Grete A Viennese Girl
- Bon Voyage (1933) – Monika Brink
- Ich kenn' dich nicht und liebe dich (1934) – Gloria Claassen
- A Girl Whirls By the World (1934) – Leonore 'Lenox' Brehmer
- Tales from the Vienna Woods (1934) – Milly Scheffers
- Miss Liselott (1934) – Liselotte Fischer
- The Cat in the Bag (1935) – Irene Ferenczy
- Winter Night's Dream (1935) – Hilde Müller
- Eva (1935) – Eva
- Forget Me Not (1935) – Liselotte Heßfeld – seine Sekretärin
- The Merry Wives (1936) – Viola Evans
- Rendezvous in Vienna (1936) – Gusti Aigner
- The Fairy Doll (1936) – Komtess Felizitas – ihre Nichte
- Prater (1936) – Tini
- Geheimnis eines alten Hauses (1936) – Mary Hofmeyer
- Woman's Love—Woman's Suffering (1937) – Marie Haßler
- Musik für dich (1937) – Hella
- Ihr Leibhusar (1938) – Marie Toldy
- Frühlingsluft (1938) – Elli Nolte
- The Woman at the Crossroads (1938) – Dr.med. Hanna Weigand
- Who's Kissing Madeleine? (1939) – Madeleine Pasqual
- The Right to Love (1939) – Vroni Mareiter
- The Girl at the Reception (1940) – Beate
- Herzensfreud – Herzensleid (1940) – Toni, seine Tochter
- Am Abend auf der Heide (1941) – Änne
- Die heimlichen Bräute (1942) – Inge Thiele
- Liebeskomödie (1943) – Christel Schönbach
- Two Happy People (1943)
- A Man for My Wife (1943) – Dagmar Stollberg
- Eines Tages (1945) – Bettina Pahlen
- Ein Mann gehört ins Haus (1948) – Loni Tannhofer
- Die Sterne lügen nicht (1950) – Frau Bürgermeister Brigitte Krambach
- When the White Lilacs Bloom Again (1953) – Therese Forster
- Love Is Forever (1954) – Mrs. Vogelreuther
- Victoria in Dover (1954) – Baroness Lehzen
- Die Deutschmeister (1955) – Therese Hübner
- Sissi (1955) – Duchess Ludovika in Bayern / Vickie
- Sissi – The Young Empress (1956) – Duchess Ludovika in Bayern
- The Girl and the Legend (1957) – Mrs. Cantley
- Von allen geliebt (1957) – Lotte Fürst
- Sissi – Fateful Years of an Empress (1957) – Duchess Ludovika of Bavaria
- The House of Three Girls (1958) – Frau Tschöll
- Eva (1959) – Mutter Dassau
- Verdammt die jungen Sünder nicht (1961) – Vera Jüttner
