= Sissi – The Young Empress =

Sissi – Die junge Kaiserin
- Theatrical release poster
- Directed by: Ernst Marischka
- Written by: Ernst Marischka
- Produced by: Karl Ehrlich; Ernst Marischka
- Starring: Romy Schneider; Karlheinz Böhm; Magda Schneider; Gustav Knuth; Vilma Degischer; Josef Meinrad
- Music by: Anton Profes
- Release date: 19 December 1956
- Running time: 101 minutes
- Country: Austria
- Language: German
- Box office: 5.3 million DM

Sissi – The Young Empress (German: Sissi – Die junge Kaiserin) is a 1956 Austrian film directed by Ernst Marischka and starring Romy Schneider, Karlheinz Böhm, Magda Schneider, Uta Franz, Gustav Knuth, Vilma Degischer and Josef Meinrad. It was entered into the 1957 Cannes Film Festival. It is the second film in the Sissi trilogy, following Sissi and preceding Sissi – Fateful Years of an Empress. This movie in three parts tells the famous story of the Empress of Austria best known as Sissi.

== Plot ==
Sissi slowly adapts to life as empress of Austria, but her mother-in-law is hard to live with. Archduchess Sophie adheres to the long-established rules, protocol and etiquette, and constantly interferes not only with the emperor's government of the empire but in his family life as well. When Sissi's first child is born, the Archduchess Sophie insists on taking away the child to raise her, because she feels Sissi is too young and inexperienced to do so. Sophie also feels that Sissi's place is not in the nursery with her baby, but with her husband as the emperor travels around the empire.

A scandal threatens to break out when Sissi leaves Vienna and returns to Bavaria to see her parents. She keeps the truth from her mother, but confesses to her father that she cannot live with Archduchess Sophie's constant criticism and tyranny. Franz Joseph follows her and finally convinces her to return to Vienna.

This strengthens Sissi's influence with the emperor, and she supports Count Gyula Andrássy and the cause of the Hungarians for equal standing in the Empire. The film concludes with her being crowned Queen of the Hungarians in Buda.

== Starring ==
- Romy Schneider as Empress Elisabeth of Austria, or "Sissi"
- Karlheinz Böhm as Emperor Franz Joseph I of Austria
- Vilma Degischer as Archduchess Sophie, Franz Joseph's mother
- Erich Nikowitz as Archduke Franz Karl, Franz Joseph's father
- Magda Schneider as Duchess Ludovika in Bavaria, Sissi's mother
- Gustav Knuth as Duke Max in Bavaria, Sissi's father
- Josef Meinrad as Oberst Böckl
- Richard Eybner as Postmaster of Ischl
- Walter Reyer as Count Andrássy
- Senta Wengraf as Countess Bellegarde
- Helene Lauterböck as Countess Esterhazy-Liechtenstein

== Historical inaccuracies ==
- The film portrays the historical events as if they had happened much earlier than they actually did. The Austro-Hungarian Compromise and the coronation of the imperial couple as King and Queen of Hungary happened in 1867, 12 years after Sissi's first daughter Sophie was born. This is in contrast to the third film, Fateful Years of an Empress, which instead narrates historical events prior to 1859.
- Sissi's first daughter, Sophie, died at the age of two during a trip to Hungary. The second child, Gisela, born one year later, survived the same disease.
- The Archduchess Sophie indeed removed Sissi's daughters from her custody and took care of their education; Elisabeth suffered from it but accepted the decision and did not flee from the court.
- Sissi's escape from Vienna happened instead, for the same reasons, after the birth of her son Rudolph. She would later oppose the strict military education planned for him.

== Music ==
In addition to creations by Anton Profes, the film's music includes many classical works, including several waltzes by Johann Strauss and the Hallelujah from Messiah by Georg Friedrich Handel, as well as the waltz "Les Nubiennes" from the opera Faust (Act 5) by Charles Gounod.
