= Sissi – Fateful Years of an Empress =

1957 film by Ernst Marischka

- Theatrical release poster
- German: Sissi – Schicksalsjahre einer Kaiserin
- Directed by: Ernst Marischka
- Written by: Ernst Marischka
- Produced by: Karl Ehrlich; Ernst Marischka
- Starring: Romy Schneider; Karlheinz Böhm; Magda Schneider; Gustav Knuth; Uta Franz; Vilma Degischer; Walther Reyer; Senta Wengraf; Josef Meinrad; Erich Nikowitz; Karl Fochler
- Cinematography: Bruno Mondi
- Edited by: Alfred Srp
- Music by: Anton Profes
- Production company: Erma-Film
- Distributed by: Sascha Filmverleih
- Release date: 19 December 1957
- Running time: 109 minutes
- Country: Austria
- Language: German
- Box office: 2.8 million DM

Sissi – Fateful Years of an Empress (German: Sissi – Schicksalsjahre einer Kaiserin) is a 1957 Austrian film written and directed by Ernst Marischka and starring Romy Schneider and Karlheinz Böhm, with Magda Schneider, Gustav Knuth, Uta Franz, Vilma Degischer and Walther Reyer. It was entered into the 1958 Cannes Film Festival. The costumes are by Gerdago (Gerda Gottschlich).

It is the last film in the Sissi trilogy, following Sissi (1955) and Sissi – The Young Empress (1956). The director Ernst Marischka planned a fourth film, but Schneider refused to play Sissi any longer. She appeared 15 years later again as Empress Elisabeth in Luchino Visconti's 1972 film Ludwig.

== Plot ==
Empress Elisabeth of Austria, nicknamed Sissi, enjoys travelling in Hungary. She welcomes the politically valuable friendship of Count Andrássy, but when he confesses he is in love with her, she returns to Vienna lest the relationship become too intimate. Her time in Hungary is only a temporary relief from the frustrations of court life in Vienna, where dutiful Franz Josef remains at his desk and allows his strict, domineering mother Sophie to interfere in the raising of his daughter with Sissi, Sophie. Sissi decides to return and meets Franz underway who was coming to Hungary to bring her back to Vienna. They decide to take a vacation in Bad Ischl but Sissi falls ill and is diagnosed with possibly fatal tuberculosis. On doctors' orders Franz Josef must allow his mother to remove his daughter from Sissi's keeping.

In poor health, deprived of the company of husband and child, Sissi is in danger of losing the will to live as she travels to healthier climates on Madeira and Corfu. Desperately needed psychosomatic therapy appears in the form of her indestructibly positive mother Ludovika, who lovingly nurses Sissi's illness and restores her zest for life by taking her on idyllic walks. Once again Oberst Böckl, the clumsy body-guard whose doting admiration for the empress borders on the improper, provides a comical note, as he does in each part of the trilogy.

Finally, Sissi recovers and rejoins her husband on an official visit to Milan and Venice, Austria's remaining possessions in northern Italy. Italian nationalists have prepared a hostile welcome for the Habsburg sovereigns; the Milanese nobility send their servants, dressed in noble clothing, to a royal command performance at La Scala, at which the orchestra begins with the melody of Joseph Haydn's "Gott erhalte Franz den Kaiser" but smoothly transitions to Verdi's chorus "Va, pensiero" from Nabucco and the disguised servants in the audience sing it in protest against Austrian rule. There is a moment of comic relief when, after the opera, Franz Josef and Sissi receive the disguised servants at a formal reception, where the servants are presented to the imperial couple under the names of their aristocratic masters and mistresses. Sissi is aware that she is not meeting the true nobility, but when the real nobles realize their servants were introduced to the emperor and empress, they shriek in despair and panic at the idea that the imperial couple believe the awkward, common servants were really the aristocrats. In Venice, crowds stand in hostile silence at the couple's procession by royal barge on the Grand Canal and as they pass, Italian nationalist flags are defiantly unfurled from behind shuttered windows. But the emotional Italians melt when they witness the openly loving reunion between Sissi and her little daughter on St Mark's Square.

== Cast ==
- Romy Schneider as Empress Elisabeth of Austria, or "Sissi"
- Karlheinz Böhm as Emperor Franz Joseph I of Austria
- Vilma Degischer as Archduchess Sophie, Franz Joseph's mother
- Erich Nikowitz as Archduke Franz Karl, Franz Joseph's father
- Magda Schneider as Duchess Ludovika in Bavaria, Sissi's mother
- Gustav Knuth as Duke Max in Bavaria, Sissi's father
- Uta Franz as Princess Helene in Bavaria, or "Néné", Sissi's older sister
- Walther Reyer as Count Andrássy
- Peter Neusser as Count Batthyány
- Josef Meinrad as Lieutenant Colonel Böckl
- Senta Wengraf as Countess Bellegarde (Pauline von Königsegg)
- Hans Ziegler as Dr. Seeburger
- Sonia Sorel as Henriette Mendel
- Klaus Knuth as Prince Ludwig
- Albert Rueprecht as Archduke Ferdinand Max
- Walter Regelsberger as Count Windisch-Graetz
