= Romy Schneider =

German and French actress (1938–1982)

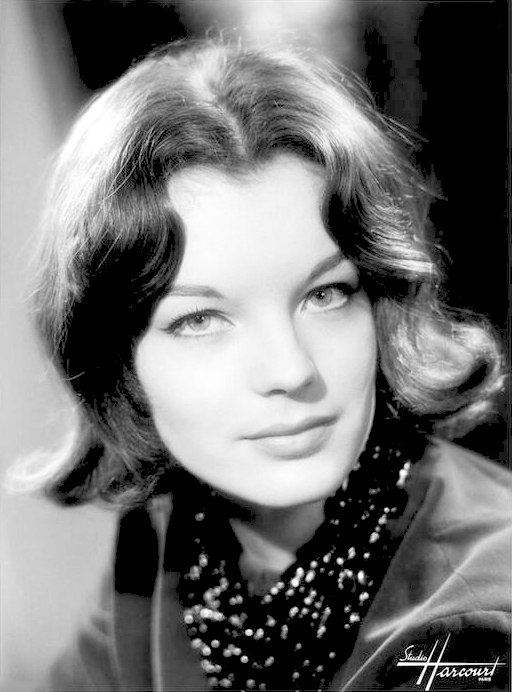
- Schneider in 1960
- Born: Rosemarie Magdalena Albach; 23 September 1938; Vienna, Austria, German Reich
- Died: 29 May 1982 (aged 43); Paris, France
- Burial place: Boissy-sans-Avoir, France
- Other name: Romy Schneider-Albach
- Occupation: Actress
- Years active: 1953–1982
- Spouses: Harry Meyen (m. 1966; div. 1975) Daniel Biasini (m. 1975; div. 1981)
- Partner(s): Alain Delon (1958–1964); Laurent Pétin (1981–1982; her death)
- Children: David Haubenstock; Sarah Biasini
- Parent(s): Wolf Albach-Retty (father); Magda Schneider (mother)
- Relatives: Rosa Albach-Retty (grandmother)

Signature
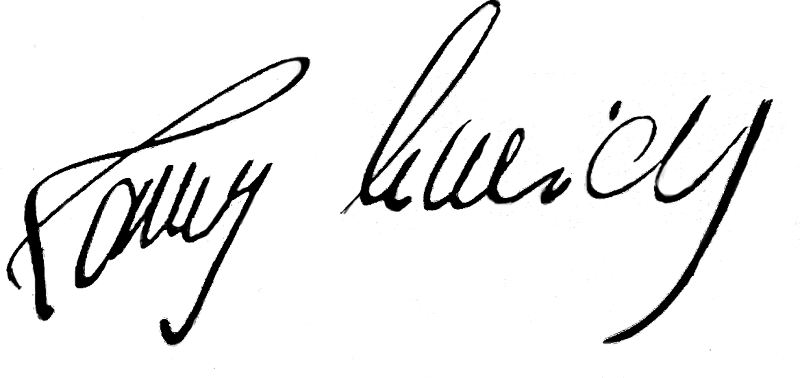

Rosemarie Magdalena Albach (23 September 1938 – 29 May 1982), known professionally as Romy Schneider (German: [ˈʁoːmi ˈʃnaɪdɐ, ˈʁɔmi -]), was a German and French actress. She is regarded as one of the greatest screen actresses of all time and became a cult figure due to her role as Empress Elisabeth of Austria in the Sissi trilogy in the mid-1950s. She later reprised the role in a more mature version in Luchino Visconti's Ludwig (1973). She began her career in the German Heimatfilm genre in the early 1950s when she was 15. Schneider moved to France, where she made successful and critically acclaimed films with some of the most notable film directors of that era. Coco Chanel called Romy "the ultimate incarnation of the ideal woman". Bertrand Tavernier remarked: "Sautet is talking about Mozart with regard to Romy. Me, I want to talk of Verdi, Mahler..."

== Early life ==
Schneider was born Rosemarie Magdalena Albach in Vienna, six months after the Anschluss of Austria into the German Reich. She was born to a theatrical family; her father Wolf Albach-Retty was a leading actor of Vienna's Volkstheater, and her mother Magda Schneider starred in scores of lavish musical films in Germany. Her paternal grandmother Rosa Albach-Retty had been one of the most popular actresses of the Austrian theater. Rosemarie, known to family as Romy from her earliest years, was educated at private schools in Berchtesgaden and Salzburg. Interested in painting, she planned to continue her education at art school, but she was also interested in school plays, not only acting in them but directing as well.

Four weeks after her birth, her parents took her to Schönau am Königssee in Germany where she and later her brother Wolf-Dieter (born 1941) grew up with their grandparents Franz Xaver and Maria Schneider on the country estate Mariengrund. In her first year, Schneider was cared for by a governess. Her parents were very rarely present due to their acting engagements. In 1943, they separated and divorced in 1945.

In September 1944, Schneider was enrolled in the elementary school of Schönau and from July 1949 she attended the girls' boarding school at Castle Goldenstein, a private secondary school of the Augustinian Canonesses of the Congregation of Notre Dame in Elsbethen near Salzburg. During her schooldays, she discovered her passion for acting which is why she was often on stage at theatrical performances at the residential school. In her diary entry of 10 June 1952, she wrote: "If it were up to me, I would immediately become an actress. ... Every time I see a nice movie, my first thoughts are about the idea: I definitely have to become an actress. Yes! I have to!" On 12 July 1953, she left the residential school Goldenstein with the degree of Mittlere Reife. After the summer holidays, she moved to Cologne to join her mother who lived there with the restaurateur and entrepreneur Hans Herbert Blatzheim.

After her parents' divorce in 1945, Magda took charge of Schneider and her brother Wolf-Dieter, eventually supervising her career, often appearing alongside her daughter. Her career was also overseen by her stepfather Blatzheim who, Schneider said, had made sexual advances on her.

== Early career ==
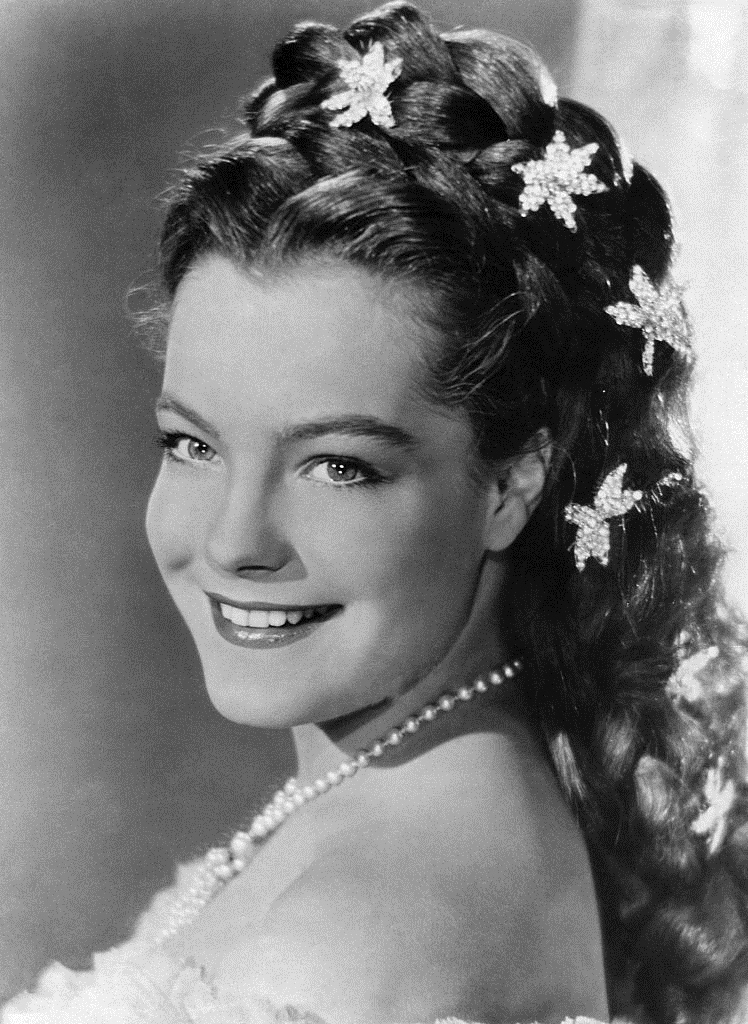
Schneider as Elisabeth of Austria in Sissi (1955)

Schneider's first film, made when she was 15, was When the White Lilacs Bloom Again (1953), credited as Romy Schneider-Albach. In 1954, Schneider, for the first time, portrayed a royal, playing a young Queen Victoria in the Austrian film Mädchenjahre einer Königin (known in the U.S. as The Story of Vickie and in Britain as Victoria in Dover).

Schneider's breakthrough came with her portrayal of Empress Elisabeth of Austria in the romantic biopic Sissi (1955) and its two sequels, Sissi – The Young Empress (1956) and Sissi – Fateful Years of an Empress (1957), all with Karlheinz Böhm, who became a close friend. Less stereotypical films during this busy period include The Girl and the Legend (1957), working with a young Horst Buchholz, and Monpti (1957), directed by Helmut Käutner, again with Buchholz. In an attempt to work on a higher artistic level, she starred with Lilli Palmer in the 1958 remake of Mädchen in Uniform.

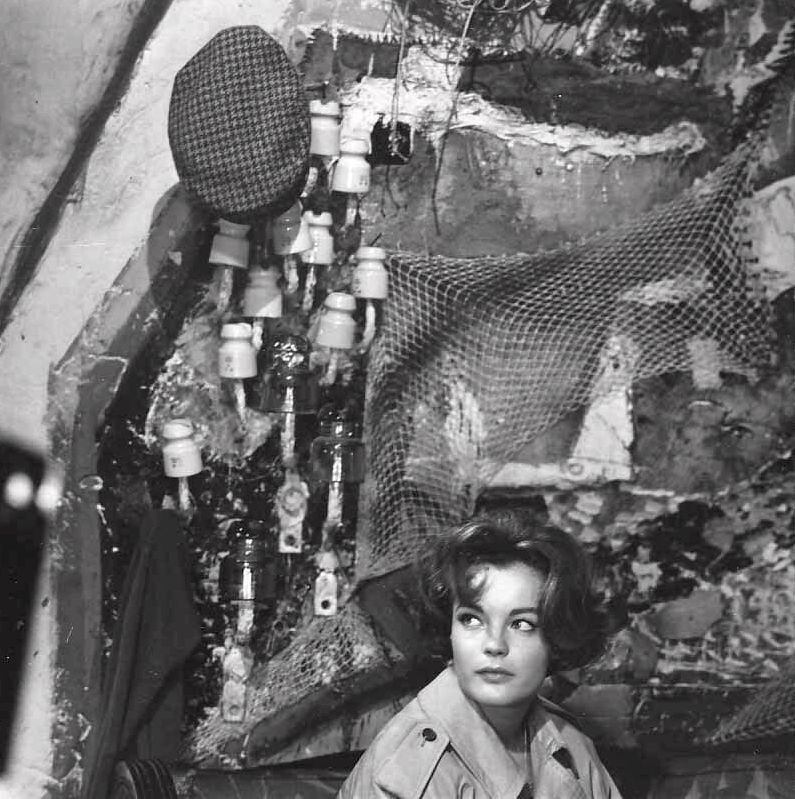
Schneider on the set of What's New Pussycat? (1965)

Schneider starred in Christine (1958), a remake of Max Ophüls's 1933 film Liebelei (in which her mother Magda Schneider had played the same role). It was during the filming of Christine that Schneider fell in love with French actor Alain Delon who co-starred in the film. She left West Germany to join him in Paris, and they announced their engagement in 1959.

Schneider decided to live and to work in France, slowly gaining the interest of film directors such as Orson Welles for The Trial (1962), based on Franz Kafka's The Trial. She was also introduced to Luchino Visconti. Under Visconti's direction, she gave performances in the Théâtre Moderne as Annabella (and Delon as Giovanni) in John Ford's stage play 'Tis Pity She's a Whore (1961), and in the film Boccaccio '70 (segment: "The Job"). In 1962, Schneider played Anna in Sacha Pitoëff's production of Chekhov's play The Seagull, also at the Théâtre Moderne.

A brief stint in Hollywood included a starring role in Good Neighbor Sam (1964), a comedy with Jack Lemmon, and What's New Pussycat? (1965), in which Schneider co-starred with Peter O'Toole, Peter Sellers, and Woody Allen.

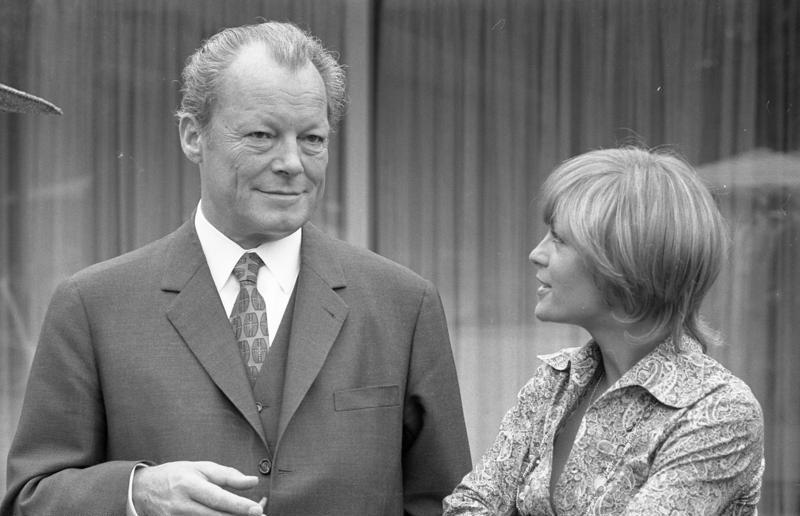
Schneider and West German chancellor Willy Brandt (1971)

In December 1963, Delon broke up with Schneider to marry Nathalie Barthélémy as he got her pregnant, and they had a son together, Anthony Delon. Delon divorced Barthélémy in 1969, after which he kept pursuing Schneider, but she always refused to get back together. However, they remained close lifelong friends and continued to work together in such films as La Piscine (The Swimming Pool, 1968) and The Assassination of Trotsky (1972).

== Later career ==
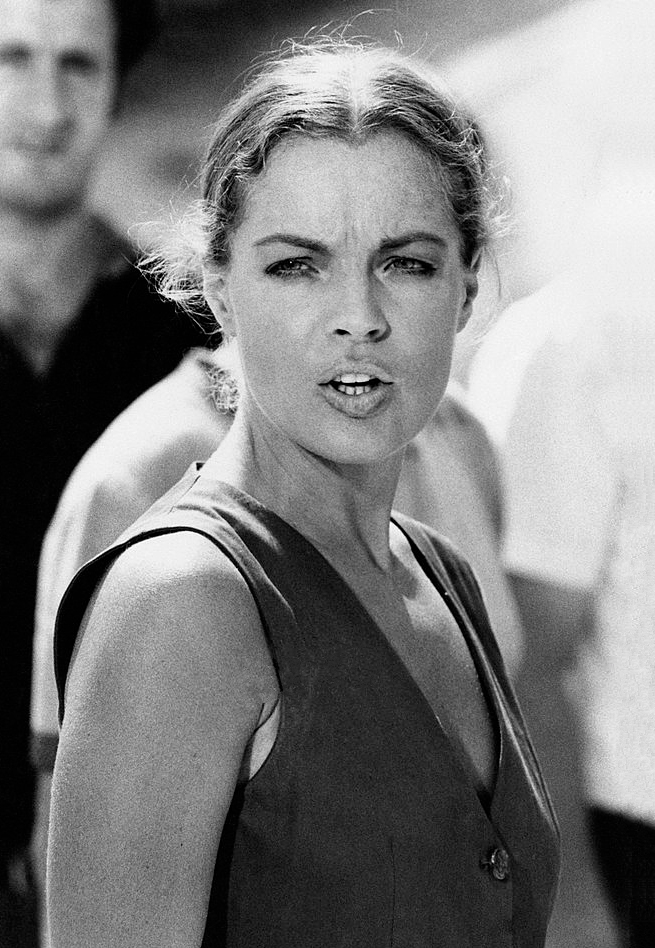
Schneider during the filming of Lady Caliph (1970)

Schneider continued to work in France during the 1970s, most notably with director Claude Sautet on five films. Their first collaboration, The Things of Life (Les choses de la vie, 1970) featuring Michel Piccoli, made Schneider an icon in France. The three collaborated again for the noir thriller Max et les ferrailleurs (Max and the Junkmen, 1971), and she appeared with Yves Montand in Sautet's César et Rosalie (1972).

Schneider portrayed a more mature and realistic Elisabeth of Austria in Ludwig (1973), Visconti's film about the life of King Ludwig II of Bavaria. "Sissi sticks to me just like oatmeal", Schneider once said.

Paris Match wrote in 1971: "Forty years after Greta and Marlene, fifteen years after Marilyn, the screen again has a great star."

Other successes from this period included Le Train (1973), Claude Chabrol's thriller Innocents with Dirty Hands (Les innocents aux mains sales, 1975) with Rod Steiger, and Le vieux fusil (1975). The gritty That Most Important Thing: Love (L'important c'est d'aimer, 1974) garnered her first César Award (France's equivalent of the Oscar), a feat she repeated five years later, in her last collaboration with Sautet, for A Simple Story (Une histoire simple, 1978).

On 30 October 1974, Schneider was the second guest on Dietmar Schönherr's talk show Je später der Abend (The Later the Evening) when she, after a rather terse interview, remarked passionately to the last guest, bank robber and author Burkhard Driest: "Sie gefallen mir. Sie gefallen mir sehr." (I like you. I like you a lot.)

U.S. filmmaker Michael Cimino wanted Schneider to star as the female lead in his political love story Perfect Strangers. She would have starred alongside Roy Scheider and Oskar Werner. The film, however, was ultimately cancelled after several weeks of pre-production shooting because of "political machinations".

She also acted in The Infernal Trio (1974) with Michel Piccoli, and in Garde à vue (1981) with Michel Serrault and Lino Ventura. An unpleasant incident occurred during this period with leading German film director Rainer Werner Fassbinder, who wanted to cast her as the lead in his film The Marriage of Maria Braun (1979). Negotiations broke down when he called Schneider a "dumb cow", to which she responded by declaring she would never work with such a "beast". Fassbinder cast Hanna Schygulla instead, reviving his professional association with an actress to whom he had likewise been offensive.

Schneider starred in Bertrand Tavernier's Death Watch (La mort en direct, 1980), playing a dying woman whose last days are watched on national television via a camera implanted in the brain of a journalist (Harvey Keitel). It is based on D. G. Compton's novel. Schneider's last film was La Passante du Sans-Souci (The Passerby, 1982).

At the time of her death, she and Alain Delon were involved in the early planning of the never-realised film L'autre contre autre by Pierre Granier-Deferre.

== Personal life ==
Following the end of her relationship with Delon in December 1963, Schneider married German director and actor Harry Meyen in July 1966; they divorced in 1975. They had a son, David Christopher (1966–1981). On 5 July 1981, David died during surgery after slipping while climbing a wrought-iron gate at his stepfather's parents' home in Saint-Germain-en-Laye and being impaled on the spikes of a fence below.

Schneider had affairs with Willy Brandt, Louis Malle (1963), Sammy Davis Jr. (1964), Oswalt Kolle (1964), Giovanni Volpi (1964–1970s), Luis Miguel Dominguín (1970s) and actor Bruno Ganz (early 1970s). She also had an affair with Jorge Guinle (1965), who said that Schneider was the great love of his life. She had a brief affair with Jean-Louis Trintignant while filming The Train (1973). She also had in 1974 a brief affair with Jacques Dutronc while filming That Most Important Thing: Love.

Schneider appeared as one of 28 women under the banner "We've had abortions!" (German: Wir haben abgetrieben!) on the cover page of the West German magazine Stern on 6 June 1971. In that issue, 374 women publicly stated that they had had pregnancies terminated, which at that time was illegal.

In 1975, Schneider married Daniel Biasini, her private secretary; they divorced in 1981. Their daughter, Sarah, is an actress. Schneider's last romantic partner was film producer Laurent Pétin (born 1949).

Throughout her adult life, Schneider had a close connection to Judaism and stood against antisemitism and the persecution of Jews. This was influenced by guilt and shame about on her mother Magda Schneider's connection to Nazi celebrities. It was further affected by Harald Meyen's Jewish family background. This connection showed in the naming of her children, David and Sarah, and that Schneider attended synagogues. Schneider was buried with a necklace of the Star of David. This mindset also influenced her film and role choices: Anna Kupfer in The Train (1973); Clara Dandieu, wife of a fighter against the Nazis in Normandy, in Le vieux fusil (1975); Leni Gruyten, who falls in love with a Russian soldier during World War II, in Group Portrait with a Lady (1977); Emma Eckhert, a Jewish banker, in La Banquière (1980); Lisa Baumstein, whose father was shot by the Nazis, in La passante du Sans-Souci (1982) – it was Schneider, shaken by the 1980 Paris synagogue bombing, who suggested to the director Jacques Rouffio to make a film of the 1936 novel by Joseph Kessel.

On 23 May 1981, Schneider underwent surgery at the American Hospital in Neuilly-sur-Seine to remove her right kidney following the discovery of a tumour.

== Death ==
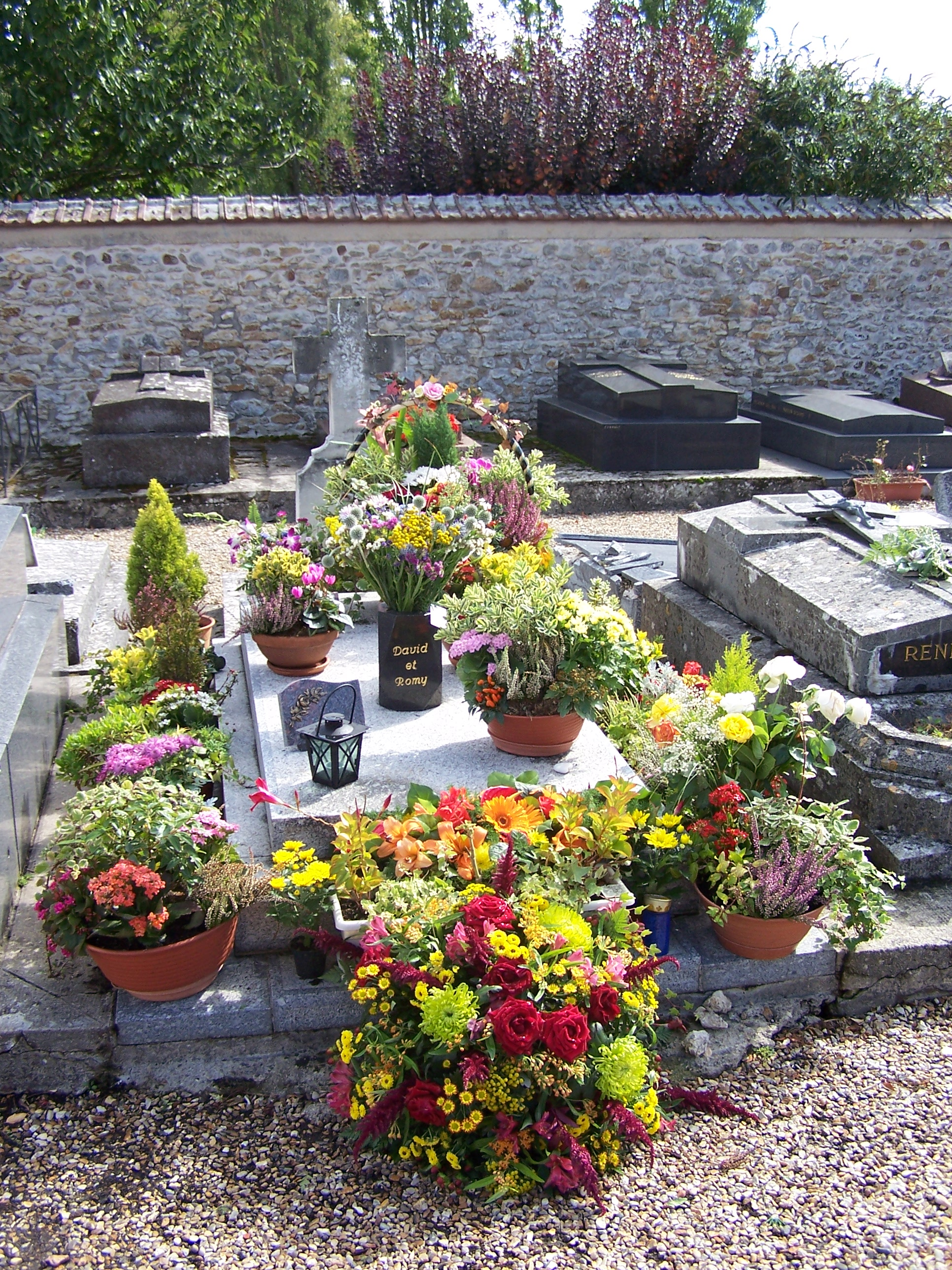
Grave of Romy Schneider and her son in Boissy-sans-Avoir

Schneider was found dead in her Paris apartment on 29 May 1982. The examining magistrate Laurent Davenas declared that she had died from cardiac arrest. Schneider's friend and sister-in-law of Laurent Pétin, Claude Pétin, attributed Schneider's cardiac arrest to a heart weakened by the kidney surgery she had undergone a year earlier. Schneider began drinking alcohol excessively after her son's death. Claude Pétin also said that she no longer drank at the time of her death and that she was convinced it was natural.

Her tombstone at Boissy-sans-Avoir, Yvelines, bears her birth name, Rosemarie Albach. Funeral guests were Jean-Claude Brialy, Michel Piccoli, Jean-Loup Dabadie and Jean Rochefort. Alain Delon arranged for her son David to be buried in the same grave.

== Enduring popularity ==
The French journalist Eugène Moineau initiated in 1984 the Prix Romy Schneider. It is one of the most prestigious awards for upcoming actresses in the French film industry, and is given by a jury each year in Paris in conjunction with the Prix Patrick Dewaere (formerly the Prix Jean Gabin). In 1990, the Austrian newspaper Kurier created the Romy TV Award in honour of Schneider. In 2003, she was voted 78th on the list of the greatest Germans in the German TV program Unsere Besten (the German version of 100 Greatest Britons)—the second-highest ranked actress (Marlene Dietrich was 50th) on that list. Until 2002, the Austrian Federal Railways InterCity service IC 535 from Wien Südbahnhof to Graz was named "Romy Schneider".

Pedro Almodóvar's film All About My Mother (1999) is partially dedicated to her.

A movie about Schneider's life, titled Eine Frau wie Romy/Une femme comme Romy (A Woman Like Romy), was planned by Warner Bros. for 2009; Schneider's role was going to be played by Yvonne Catterfeld. The project was cancelled in July 2009. A musical about Schneider, Romy – Die Welt aus Gold (Romy – The Golden World) was premiered in 2009 at the Theater Heilbronn. In November 2009, the ARD broadcast the feature film Romy with Jessica Schwarz in the title role. The film 3 Days in Quiberon (2018) by Emily Atef describes a 1981 episode in Schneider's life in the French town of Quiberon.

On 23 September 2020, Google celebrated her 82nd birthday with a Google Doodle in Germany, France, Austria, Iceland and Ukraine.

The culture broadcaster Arte dedicated a documentary to Romy Schneider and Alain Delon: Romy and Alain – The Eternal Betrothed (2022).

In April 2025, Alain-Fabien Delon (son of Alain) named his daughter Romy.

== Awards ==
- Bambi: 1957 – second place for Sissi – The Young Empress.
- Bravo Otto, female film star:
  - 1957: Bronze.
  - 1958: Gold.
  - 1959: Silver.
  - 1971: Silver.
  - 1972: Bronze.
  - 1977: Bronze.
- Étoile de Cristal: 1963 – Best Foreign Actress for The Trial.
- Golden Globe Award for Best Actress – Motion Picture Drama: 1964 – nominated for The Cardinal.
- César Award for Best Actress:
  - 1976: won for That Most Important Thing: Love.
  - 1977: nominated for A Woman at Her Window.
  - 1979: won for A Simple Story.
  - 1980: nominated for Womanlight.
  - 1983: nominated posthumously for The Passerby.
- Deutscher Filmpreis: 1977 – Filmband in Gold for her performance in Group Portrait with a Lady.
- David di Donatello: 1979 – Special David, recognising her career and her performance in A Simple Story.
- Honorary César: 2008 – awarded posthumously.

=== Awards named after Romy Schneider ===
- Prix Romy Schneider, a French film award established in 1984.
- Romy, an Austrian award established in 1990.
