= Sissi (film) =

1955 film by Ernst Marischka

- Theatrical release poster
- Directed by: Ernst Marischka
- Written by: Ernst Marischka
- Produced by: Karl Ehrlich; Ernst Marischka
- Starring: Romy Schneider; Karlheinz Böhm; Magda Schneider; Uta Franz; Gustav Knuth; Josef Meinrad; Vilma Degischer; Peter Weck
- Cinematography: Bruno Mondi
- Edited by: Alfred Srp
- Music by: Anton Profes
- Production company: Erma-Film
- Distributed by: Sascha Filmverleih
- Release date: 22 December 1955 (Austria)
- Running time: 102 minutes
- Country: Austria
- Language: German
- Box office: 5.4 million DM

Sissi is a 1955 Austrian historical romance film written and directed by Ernst Marischka and starring Romy Schneider, Karlheinz Böhm, Magda Schneider, Uta Franz, Gustav Knuth, Josef Meinrad, Vilma Degischer and Peter Weck. Sissi is the first installment in a trilogy of films about Empress Elisabeth of Austria (1837-1898), who was known to her family as "Sissi". It was followed by The Young Empress and Fateful Years of an Empress.

== Plot ==
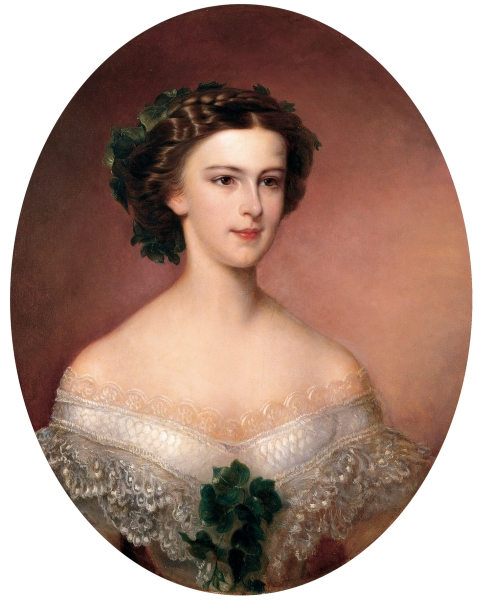
Portrait of the young empress shortly after her wedding, by Amanda Bergstedt

Princess Elisabeth, nicknamed "Sissi", is the second oldest daughter of Duke Maximilian Joseph in Bavaria and Princess Ludovika of Bavaria. She is a carefree, impulsive and nature-loving child. She is raised with her seven siblings at the family seat Possenhofen Castle on the shores of Lake Starnberg in Bavaria. She has a happy childhood free of constraints associated with her royal status.

With her mother and her demure older sister Helene (called "Néné"), 16-year-old Sissi travels from Possenhofen to the spa town of Bad Ischl in Upper Austria. Ludovika's sister, Archduchess Sophie, is the mother of the young emperor Franz Joseph I of Austria. Helene is called by Archduchess Sophie to meet the young emperor Franz Joseph in the imperial villa so that the two might be immediately engaged. Sissi is unaware of the real reason for the journey and is forbidden by her aunt to participate in any social events due to her girlishly impetuous ways.

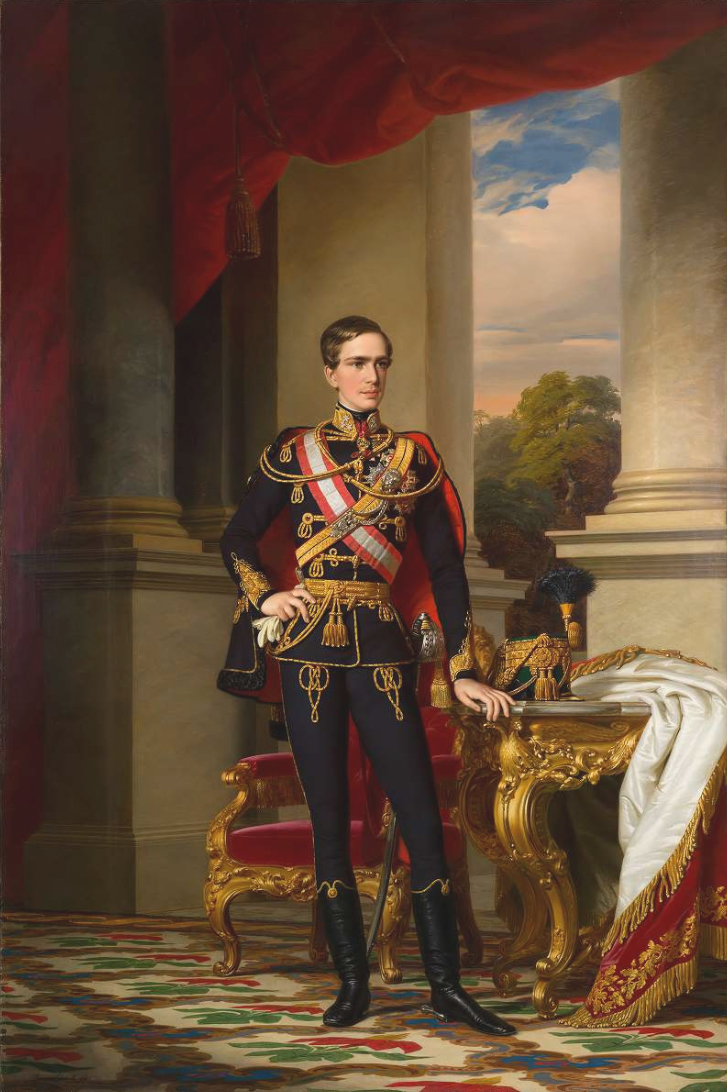
The young emperor Franz Joseph in Hungarian uniform (1853, by Miklós Barabás)

Sissi spends her time fishing in the forest where by chance she meets Franz Josef. The emperor is unaware that the girl is his cousin Sissi. He takes a liking to her and invites her for an afternoon hunting trip in the Alps. They meet as arranged in the mountains where they talk and become acquainted. Sissi falls in love with him but does not reveal her true identity. During their trip, Sissi learns of the planned marriage between Franz Joseph with her sister. The Emperor remarks that he envies the man who will marry Sissi and confesses that he feels no connection to Néné. Upon hearing his indirect declaration of love, Sissi becomes distraught due to her loyalty to Néné. She runs away from Franz Joseph without any explanation.

When Sissi returns to their residence, Néné reveals the reason for the trip to Bad Ischl: to become engaged with Franz Joseph. Unexpectedly, a new guest, the Prince of Lippe, arrives and Sissi is invited by the Archduchess to act as his partner at the Emperor's birthday celebration. At his birthday party, Franz Joseph is suddenly confronted by Sissi's appearance there with her mother and sister. He realises who Sissi is and tries to talk to her, openly confessing his love and asking her to marry him. Sissi rejects Franz Joseph out of loyalty to her sister. He defies his mother's reservations and Sissi's resistance and announces, to the surprise of his guests, his betrothal to Sissi. Néné is heartbroken and leaves the party crying. Sissi, in a state of shock, is forced to obey the Emperor's wishes.

In Possenhofen, preparations for the wedding have started. Sissi is not excited about her impending marriage, as the hurt Néné has left for an indefinite period. For her sister's sake, Sissi attempts to break her engagement. However, Néné returns with a new suitor, Maximilian Anton, Hereditary Prince of Thurn and Taxis. The sisters reunite and Néné gives her blessing to Sissi for her marriage.

For the wedding ceremony, Sissi travels with her family on the steamboat Franz Joseph down the Danube to Vienna. People line the banks, waving flags and cheering their future Empress. As part of a grand procession, Sissi enters the city in a gilded carriage. The wedding takes place in the Augustinian Church on 24 April 1854.

== Cast ==
- Romy Schneider as Empress Elisabeth of Austria, or "Sissi"
- Karlheinz Böhm as Emperor Franz Joseph I of Austria
- Magda Schneider as Duchess Ludovika in Bavaria, Sissi's mother and Sophie's sister
- Uta Franz as Princess Helene in Bavaria, or "Néné", Sissi's older sister
- Gustav Knuth as Duke Maximilian Joseph in Bavaria, Sissi's father
- Vilma Degischer as Archduchess Sophie, Franz Joseph's mother
- Josef Meinrad as Major Böckl of the Gendarmerie
- Erich Nikowitz as Archduke Franz Karl, Franz Joseph's father
- Karl Fochler as Count Grünne
- Peter Weck as Archduke Karl Ludwig, Franz Joseph's brother
- Hilde Wagener as Count Wulffen
- Egon von Jordan as Graf Arco, Minister
- Otto Treßler as Marshal Radetzky
- Franz Böheim as Johann Petzmacher
- Richard Eybner as Postmaster of Ischl
- Fritz Muliar as Blumenbote

== Filming locations ==
Finance came in part from Allied Artists.

Sissi was filmed in some original places the Empress visited, including Schönbrunn Palace and the Kaiservilla in Bad Ischl. The scenes of her youth on Lake Starnberg, however, were actually filmed at Fuschl Castle at Lake Fuschl in the Salzkammergut region because Possenhofen Castle was in a poor condition at the time. The wedding celebration was filmed at St. Michael's Church, Vienna.

== Reception ==
An early film about the life of the empress was The King Steps Out, a 1936 American comedy film directed by Josef von Sternberg, starring Grace Moore. Since the rights to the original play Sissys Brautfahrt by Ernst Décsey and Robert Weil were bought from Marischka by Columbia Pictures, he bought instead the 1952 novel Sissi from Marie Blank-Eisman. Marischka then adapted the script based on the novel.

Sissi was viewed by an estimated 20 to 25 million people in cinemas. It is one of the most successful German-language films. The film was followed by The Young Empress (1956) and Fateful Years of an Empress (1957). In 1962, a condensed version of the trilogy was released in English under the title Forever My Love. The trilogy is a popular Christmas television special, and is shown with some regularity on channels in German-speaking countries, Hungary and Italy. The Empress' date of birth on Christmas Eve 1837 adds to the appeal of the film as a Christmas special.

The success of the film marked Empress Elisabeth's entrance to popular culture which made the historical figure even more legendary. The popularity of the films attracted tourists to places which were associated with the Empress, specifically those in Austria. The popularity also led to the creation of the 1992 musical Elisabeth, which became the most successful German-language musical of all time. The trilogy was parodied in the 2007 animated film Lissi.

Romy Schneider's role as Elisabeth is considered her acting breakthrough. She became synonymous with her role in the film, even as she progressed in her acting career. Schneider reprised the role of Elisabeth in Luchino Visconti's 1972 film Ludwig, this time portraying the Empress as a mature and cynical woman.

Sissi was very popular when it aired on Mainland Chinese television in the 1980s.

The exoplanet HAT-P-14b and its host star were respectively named Sissi and Franz in the 2019 NameExoWorlds contest, after the main characters of the film.
