= Der Schinderhannes =

1958 film directed by Helmut Käutner

- Directed by: Helmut Käutner
- Written by: Carl Zuckmayer (play); George Hurdalek
- Starring: Curd Jürgens; Maria Schell
- Distributed by: Metro-Goldwyn-Mayer
- Release date: 1958
- Country: West Germany
- Language: German
- Budget: $63,000
- Box office: $175,000

Der Schinderhannes is a 1958 film directed by Helmut Käutner, starring Curd Jürgens and Maria Schell. It was also known as Duel in the Forest. The story depicts the life of the 18th century outlaw Schinderhannes. It is based on a 1927 play Schinderhannes by Carl Zuckmayer.

== Reception ==
According to MGM records the film earned $175,000, making a loss to the studio of $49,000.

== See also ==
- The Prince of Rogues (1928)
