= Käthe Dorsch =

German actress

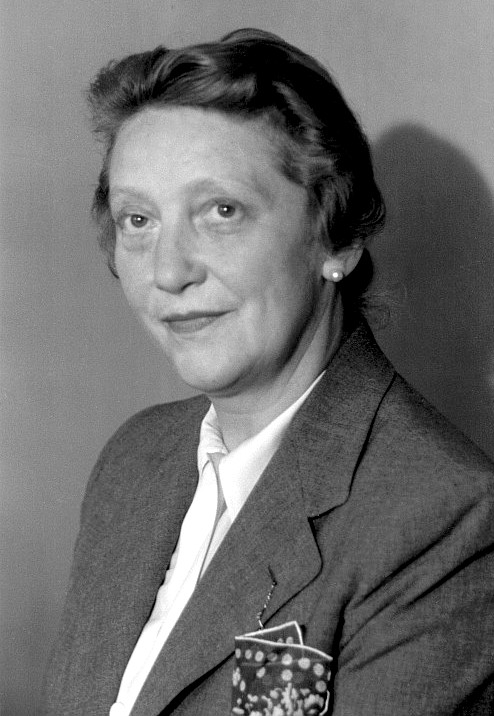
- Born: 29 December 1890; Neumarkt in der Oberpfalz, Kingdom of Bavaria, German Empire
- Died: 25 December 1957 (aged 66); Vienna, Austria
- Occupation: Actress
- Years active: 1905–1957
- Spouse: Harry Liedtke (m. 1920; div. 1928)

Katharina "Käthe" Dorsch (pronounced [ˈkɛː.tə ˈdɔʁʃ], 29 December 1890 – 25 December 1957) was a German stage and film actor.

== Biography ==
Katharina Dorsch was born on 29 December 1890 at 5:30 P.M. in the Bavarian town of Neumarkt in der Oberpfalz, the daughter of Christoph Dorsch (died 1901), a bakery helper, and Magdalena Dorsch (née Lindl). Her family moved to Nuremberg when she was three years old. Dorsch attended a trade school, took piano lessons, and had her first engagement aged 15 as a choir singer at the Staatstheater, performing Wagner's Die Meistersinger von Nürnberg. Later, she also performed in Hanau and Mannheim, mainly participating in operettas.

Dorsch's first major role was as Ännchen in the Max Halbe drama Youth, being the substitute for a sick colleague. Despite Dorsch's negative attitude towards the operetta, for financial reasons she decided to commit herself as a soubrette soprano in Mainz in 1908, going to Berlin in 1911 to perform at the Theater am Schiffbauerdamm. Dorsch also worked at the Residenz Theatre, Deutsches Theater, and Konzerthaus Berlin. In 1927 she traveled to Vienna, where she performed at the Volkstheater. She appeared in Carl Zuckmayer's 1927 play Schinderhannes. Her greatest success was in the title role of Franz Lehár's operetta Friederike, which premiered on 4 October 1928 at the Neues Schauspielhaus.

In 1936, Dorsch appeared at the Staatstheater in Berlin, and was a member of the Burgtheater from 1939 until her death. She returned to the Berlin stage in 1946.

In addition to her lengthy stage career, Dorsch also appeared on the screen. She made her film debut in the 1916 short Allzuviel ist ungesund. She appeared in numerous films before taking a hiatus in 1924. She returned to the film industry in 1930, starring in Die Lindenwirtin, followed by Three Days of Love (1931). Her final screen appearance was in Regine (1956).

Dorsch and her childhood friend Hermann Göring took advantage of interventions for racially threatened or politically persecuted colleagues, such as the Kabarett artist Werner Finck, who was released from the Esterwegen concentration camp on 1 July 1935.

In 1946, Dorsch slapped the then 24 year old critic Wolfgang Harich for writing a bad review about one of her plays. In 1951, she slapped Alexander Trojan for making fun of people who were born under the Zodiac sign Capricorn. In 1956, she caused a media sensation when she also slapped the Austrian theater critic Hans Weigel in front of a Vienna café.

In 1920, Dorsch married fellow actor Harry Liedtke. The two divorced in 1928. The tie to Liedtke went beyond divorce; Dorsch never overcame Liedtke's 1945 murder by the Soviet Red Army.

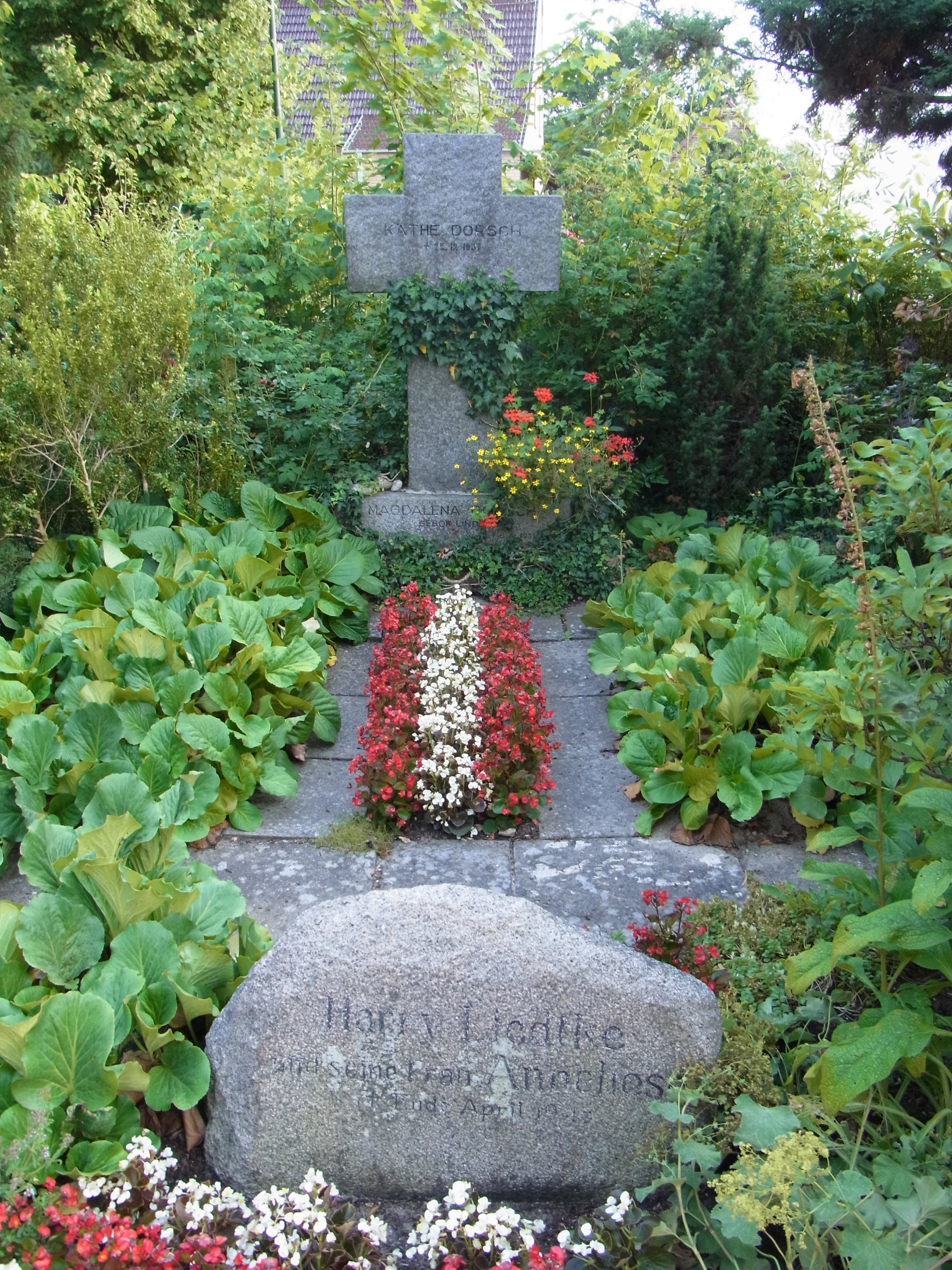
Grave of Harry Liedtke and his spouses Käthe Dorsch and Christa Tordy in Pieskow, Bad Saarow

Dorsch died on 25 December 1957 of liver disease. She is buried at the cemetery of Bad Saarow-Pieskow alongside ex-husband Harry Liedtke and his wife Christa Tordy. A memorial stands at Waldfriedhof Dahlem in Berlin.

In 1962, the Käthe-Dorsch-Gasse was named after her in Vienna. In 1966 in Gropiusstadt, a high rise building was named Käthe-Dorsch-Ring.

== Partial filmography ==
- The Queen's Secretary (1916, Short)
- Ein tolles Mädchen (1916)
- Ein Narr der Liebe (1916)
- Ein Jagdausflug nach Berlin (1917)
- Die Memoiren des Satans, 1. Teil – Doktor Mors (1917–1918, part 1, 3)
- Das fidele Gefängnis (1917) – Mizi
- Dornröschen (1917) – The queen
- John Riew – Ein Mädchenschicksal (917) – Annas Mutter
- Frau Lenes Scheidung (1917) – Lene Semmelhak
- Die Memoiren des Satans, 3.Teil - Der Fluchbeladene (1918)
- Gezwungene Liebe (1918)
- Ehemann a. D. (1918)
- Sein letzter Seitensprung (1918) – Frau des Gefängnisdirektors
- Der Glücksjunge (1918) – Fürstin Stachow
- Amor in der Klemme (1918)
- Keimendes Leben (1918–1919, part 1, 2) – (uncredited)
- Die blaue Mauritius (1918)
- Die Kunst zum Heiraten (1918)
- Erborgtes Glück (1919)
- Der junge Goethe (1919)
- Moral und Sinnlichkeit (1919) – Lisbeth
- Vendetta (1919) – Miss Ruth Alcott
- The Blue Mauritius (1919) – Stenotypsitin Else
- Können Gedanken töten? (1920) – Ragna
- Der Schauspieler der Herzogin (1920)
- The Prisoner (1920) – Crusius, Hertha, Tochter, Braut
- The Sins of the Mother (1921) – Louisa
- Miss Julie (1922) – Christine – Kitchen Maid
- Does a Woman Have to Become a Mother? (1924) - Else Hardt, geb Wolf
- Die Lindenwirtin (1930) - Annemarie Babinger, Landwirtin
- Three Days of Love (1931) - Lena
- Savoy Hotel 217 (1936) - Anna Fedorowna Orlowa
- A Woman of No Importance (1936) - Sylvia Kelvil
- Yvette (1938) - Oktavia Obardi
- Morgen werde ich verhaftet (1939) - Maria Burger
- Mistake of the Heart (1939) - Oberin
- A Mother's Love (1939) - Marthe Pirlinger
- Trenck the Pandur (1940) – Kaiserin Maria Theresia
- The Comedians (1941) - Karoline Neuber
- Singende Engel (1947) – Kaiserin
- Journey to Happiness (1948) – Celia Loevengaard
- Das Kuckucksei (1949) – Marie Müller
- The Prisoner (1949) - Eugenie - Marquise de Troissaules
- Regine (1956) – Therese Lund (final film role)
