= Schinderhannes (play) =

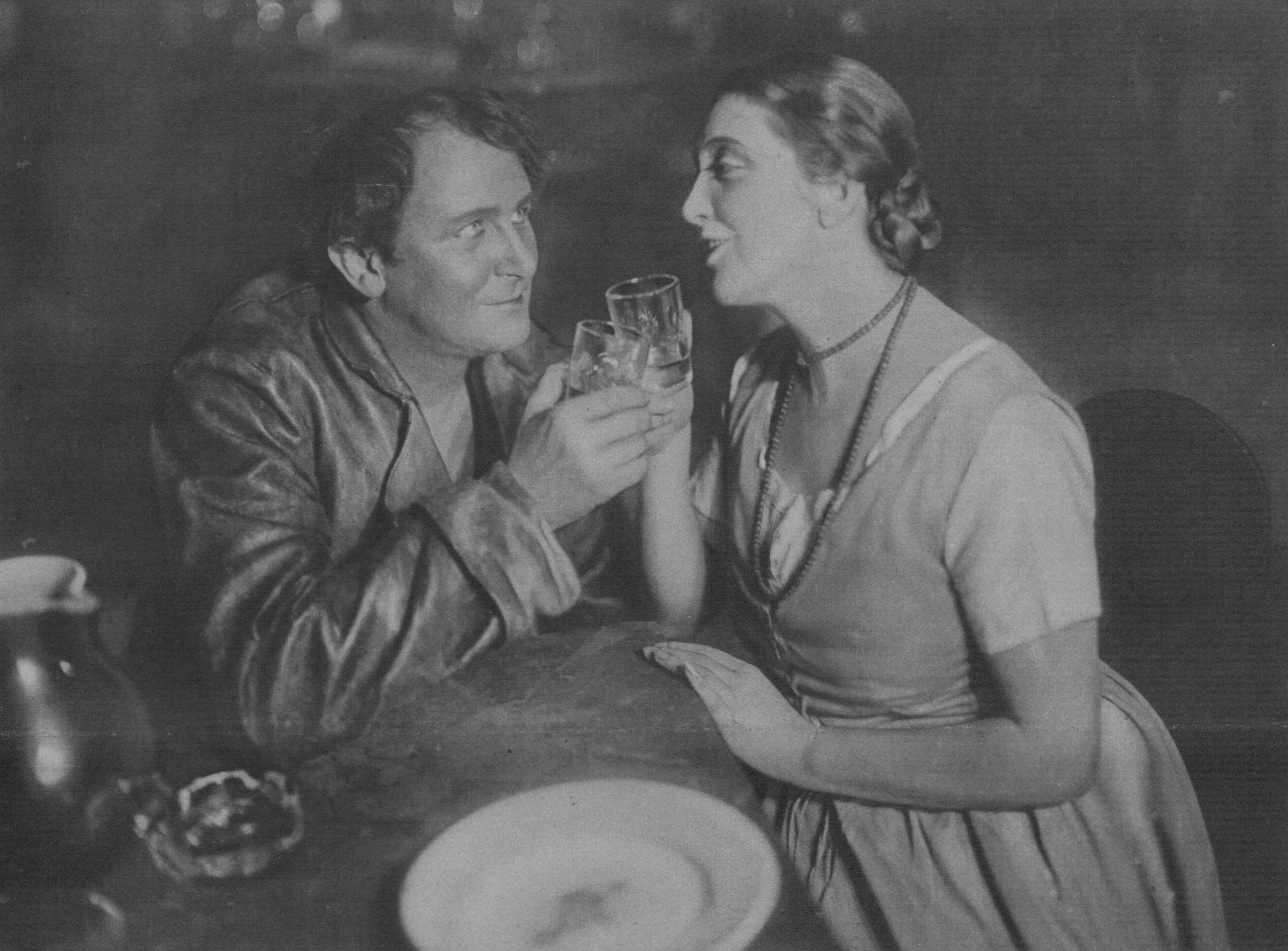
Eugen Klöpfer as Schinderhannes and Käthe Dorsch as Julchen (1927)

Schinderhannes is a 1927 play by the German writer Carl Zuckmayer. It was first performed on 13 October 1927 at the Lessing Theater in Berlin starring Eugen Klöpfer and Käthe Dorsch.

The play portrays the adventures of the 18th century German criminal Schinderhannes, often compared to Robin Hood, whose gang operated around the Hunsrück mountains in the Rhineland. Zuckmayer's drama is based on the life story of Schinderhannes, but without being completely historically accurate.

== Film ==
In 1928 the play was adapted into a film The Prince of Rogues, directed by Curtis Bernhardt and starring Hans Stüwe as Schinderhannes.

1958 Der Schinderhannes, directed by Helmut Käutner, starring Curd Jürgens as Schinderhannes.

== Bibliography ==
- Wagener, Hans. Carl Zuckmayer Criticism: Tracing Endangered Fame. Camden House, 1995. ISBN 978-1-57113-064-8.
