= Des Teufels General (play) =

Play written by Carl Zuckmayer

Des Teufels General is a 1946 play written by German author and playwright Carl Zuckmayer, translated as The Devil's General. The title character of the play, General Harras, is based on the ace Ernst Udet. The play is based upon his struggles during the war, simultaneously working under and openly being against the Nazi Party. Despite the serious scenario of it, a comical and satirical tone is often used throughout the play.

== Characters ==
- Harras, aviation general.
- Lüttjohann, Harras' adjutant.
- Korrianke, Harras' chauffeur.
- Friedrich Eilers, colonel & leader of the war front and military.
- Hartmann, aviation officer.
- Writzky, aviation officer.
- Hastenteuffel, aviation officer.
- Pfundtmayer, aviation officer.
- Sigbert von Mohrungen, president of the Office for Procuring Crude Metal.
- Baron Pflungk, Attaché for the Ministry of Foreign Affairs.
- Dr. Schmidt-Lausitz, cultural leader.
- Der Maler Schlick, the painter Schlick.
- Oderbruch, engineer in the Ministry of Aviation.
- Anne Eilers, wife of Friedrich Eilers.
- Waltraut von Mohrungen, who goes by the alias Pützchen. Anne's sister.
- Olivia Geiss, diva.
- Diddo Geiss, Olivia's niece; love interest of General Harras, despite being much younger than he.
- Lyra Schoeppke, named die Tankstelle, which means "The Gas Station."
- Otto, restaurant manager.
- Francois, French speaking restaurant waiter.
- Herr Detlev, restaurant waiter.
- Buddy Lawrence, an American journalist.
- Zwei Arbeiter, two workers.
- Ein Polizeikommissar, a police commissioner.

== Screen adaptations ==
In 1955, Des Teufels General was adapted into a black and white film of the same title. The film features Curd Jürgens as Harras, Marianne Koch as Dorothea 'Diddo' Geiss, Viktor de Kowa as SS-Gruppenführer Schmidt-Lausitz, Eva Ingeborg Scholz as Waltraut 'Pützchen' Mohrungen, and Harry Meyen as Leutnant Hartmann. At the German Film Awards of 1955 Marianne Koch won the Film Award in Silver for Outstanding Individual Achievement: Supporting Actress for her performance in the film.

A BBC TV adaptation of the play in the Sunday Night Theatre strand was broadcast on 18 December 1955. Translated by Robert Gore Brown, and directed by Rudolph Cartier, it starred Marius Goring as Harras, Margaretta Scott as Olivia Geiss, Helena Hughes as Diddo Geiss, and Cyril Shaps as Doctor Schmidt-Lausitz. The play was remounted as part of the Summer Theatre strand, broadcast on 14 August 1960, again with Cartier directing. Goring, Scott, and Shaps reprised their roles, with Jill Dixon replacing Hughes as Diddo Geiss. Both versions no longer exist.
