= The Blue Mauritius =

The Blue Mauritius may refer to:

- The Blue Mauritius (1918 film), a German silent film
- Blue Mauritius, a postage stamp
