= The Prince of Rogues =

1928 film

- Theatrical film poster
- German: Schinderhannes
- Directed by: Curtis Bernhardt
- Written by: Carl Zuckmayer (play); Curtis Bernhardt
- Starring: Hans Stüwe; Lissy Arna; Albert Steinrück; Bruno Ziener
- Cinematography: Günther Krampf
- Music by: Pasquale Perris
- Production company: Prometheus-Film
- Distributed by: Prometheus-Film
- Release date: 1 February 1928
- Running time: 120 minutes
- Country: Germany
- Languages: Silent; German intertitles

The Prince of Rogues (German: Schinderhannes) is a 1928 German silent drama film directed by Curtis Bernhardt and starring Hans Stüwe, Lissy Arna and Albert Steinrück. It was shot at the Johannisthal Studios in Berlin. The film's art direction was by Heinrich Richter. The story depicts the life of the 18th century outlaw Schinderhannes. It is based on a 1927 play Schinderhannes by Carl Zuckmayer.

== Cast ==
- Hans Stüwe as Hannes Bückler - Schinderhannes
- Lissy Arna as Julchen Blasius
- Albert Steinrück as Leyendecker
- Bruno Ziener as the old Bückler
- Frida Richard as Seine Frau
- Ivan Koval-Samborsky as Karl Benzel
- Fritz Richard as the old Blasius
- Fritz Rasp as Heinrich Benzel
- Oskar Homolka as Amtmann
- Willy Grunwald as robber
- Nico Turoff as robber
- Albert Florath
- Tonio Gennaro as robber
- Holmes Zimmermann as robber
- Erich Kober
- Carl Busse
- Ernst Rotmund

== See also ==
- Der Schinderhannes (1958)
