= Magnificent Sinner =

Katia
- Theatrical release poster
- Directed by: Robert Siodmak
- Screenplay by: Georges Neveux; Charles Spaak
- Produced by: Michel Safra
- Starring: Romy Schneider; Curd Jürgens
- Cinematography: Michel Kelber
- Edited by: Louisette Hautecoeur; Henri Taverna
- Music by: Joseph Kosma
- Production company: Spéva Films
- Distributed by: Cinédis
- Release date: 20 January 1960
- Running time: 96 minutes
- Country: France
- Language: French

Magnificent Sinner (original French title: Katia) is a 1959 French drama historical film by director Robert Siodmak about the romance between Tsar Alexander II of Russia and the then-schoolgirl Catherine Dolgorukova, who later became his mistress and finally his morganatic wife. It stars Romy Schneider as Katia, a schoolgirl who becomes the Tsar's mistress and Curd Jürgens as Tsar Alexander II of Russia. The film, originally released as Katia, was a remake of a 1938 French film of the same name, which starred Danielle Darrieux.

== Plot ==
Produced in France, Magnificent Sinner stars Curd Jürgens as Tsar Alexander II, with Romy Schneider as the schoolgirl Katia who first becomes his mistress, before being elevated to the rank of princess. The romance between a married emperor and an aristocrat leads to court intrigue and a weakening of the ties of loyalty between the Tsar's ministers and their ruler, and is instrumental in Alexander's ultimate assassination.

== Cast ==
- Romy Schneider as Katia
- Curd Jürgens as Czar Alexander II
- Pierre Blanchar as Koubaroff
- Antoine Balpêtré as Kilbatchich
- Françoise Brion as Sophie
- Monique Mélinand as Tsarina Maria
- Michel Bouquet as Bibesco
- Bernard Dhéran as Stéphane Ryssakov
- Margo Lion as La surveillante de l'Institut Smolny
- Jacqueline Marbaux as Mlle Trépeau
- Hubert Noël as Michel Dolgorouki
- Marcel d'Orval as Petit rôle
- Yves Barsacq as Katourine
- Yves Gladine as Petit rôle
- Alain Saury as Soloviev
- Germaine Delbat as La directrice de l'Institut Smolny

== Reviews ==
Film critic Leonard Maltin gave the film two out of four stars, describing it as "lackluster." Bosley Crowther of The New York Times equally panned it as "an overstuffed costume picture" and "a hackneyed and ponderous bore." "It would be just as good, if not better," he continued, "if it had been a tractor with which the Tsar fell in love."
