= The Prisoner (1949 film) =

German historical adventure film

- Directed by: Gustav Fröhlich
- Written by: Honoré de Balzac (novel); Gustav Fröhlich
- Produced by: Rolf Meyer
- Starring: Paul Dahlke; Richard Häussler; Käthe Dorsch
- Cinematography: Igor Oberberg
- Edited by: Martha Dübber
- Music by: Werner Eisbrenner
- Production company: Junge Film-Union Rolf Meyer
- Distributed by: Schorcht Filmverleih
- Release date: 26 August 1949
- Running time: 106 minutes
- Country: West Germany
- Language: German

The Prisoner (German: Der Bagnosträfling) is a 1949 West German historical adventure film directed by Gustav Fröhlich and starring Paul Dahlke, Richard Häussler, and Käthe Dorsch. It is based a novel by the French writer Honoré de Balzac. It was made at the Bendestorf Studios outside Hamburg. The film's sets were designed by the art director Franz Schroedter.

== Cast ==
- Paul Dahlke as Robert
- Richard Häussler as Pierre
- Käthe Dorsch as Eugenie, Marquise de Troissaules
- Winnie Markus as Cyprienne
- Udo Loeptin as Tamboryn
- Walter Franck as Courbet, Kriminalinspektor
- Paul Hörbiger as Dr. Bianchon, Armenarzt von Paris
- Ida Ehre as Madame Vauquer
- Jester Naefe as Nanette
- Albert Florath as Livreuil, Präsident Bank von Frankreich
- Adrian Hoven as Victor
- Peter Mosbacher as Lapin
- Joseph Offenbach as Dubois
- Karl-Heinz Peters as Martell
- Otto Gebühr as Jean
- Helmuth Rudolph as Innenminister v. Frankreich

== Bibliography ==
- Bock, Hans-Michael; Bergfelder, Tim, eds. (2009). The Concise Cinegraph: Encyclopaedia of German Cinema. New York: Berghahn Books. ISBN 978-1-57181-655-9.
