= Encounter in Salzburg =

1964 film

- Directed by: Max Friedmann
- Written by: Thomas Münster
- Produced by: Peter Bamberger; Erwin Heiner Moll
- Starring: Curd Jürgens; Nadia Gray; Viktor de Kowa
- Cinematography: Georg Krause
- Edited by: Hermann Ludwig
- Music by: Peter Thomas
- Production company: Paris Interproductions
- Distributed by: Schorcht Filmverleih
- Release date: 19 March 1964
- Running time: 94 minutes
- Countries: France; West Germany
- Language: German

Encounter in Salzburg (German: Begegnung in Salzburg) is a 1964 French-West German drama film directed by Max Friedmann and starring Curd Jürgens, Nadia Gray and Viktor de Kowa.

A rich man visits the Salzburg Festival, watches Jedermann, and dies.

The film's sets were designed by the art director Jean d'Eaubonne.

== Plot ==
West Germany, in the early 1960s: Hans Willke is the industrial manager of the Terstappen works with 6,000 employees. His life, characterized by duty and responsibility, has been geared almost entirely to his job and he neglects his wife. After the death of her twins, she withdrew completely into herself. Willke has the feeling that he is missing out on something in real life. He spontaneously decides to go to Salzburg to see his old friend, the actor Bernhard von Wangen. He is rehearsing the stage play "Jedermann" in Salzburg. In the evening he meets the young Manuela in a cellar bar. Willke falls in love with the young woman and wants to enjoy life again. Suddenly, Willke's existence seems pointless, the sacrifice for his job a waste. As he plunges headlong into his new life, his body rebels. His heart stops, momentarily plunging him in a turbulent stream of consciousness and forcing him to face his anxieties and doubts. In the end, he suffers a fatal heart attack.

== Cast ==
- Curd Jürgens as Hans Wilke, General Director
- Nadia Gray as Felicitas Wilke
- Viktor de Kowa as Bernhard von Wangen
- Walter Giller as Kröner, Insurance Agent
- Danièle Gaubert as Manuela
- Paul Dahlke as Insurance Director
- Marte Harell as Fräulein Niederalt, Secretary
- Alexander Allerson as Mahlke
- Maurice Bernard as Preetz
- Günther Jerschke as Direktor Wechsel
- Eduard Linkers
- Armand Mestral as Dr. Neubert
- Joachim Rake as Direktor Brähm
- Rolf von Nauckhoff as Hiesemann

== Bibliography ==
- Goble, Alan. The Complete Index to Literary Sources in Film. Walter de Gruyter, 1999.
