= The House of Intrigue (1956 film) =

1956 film by Duilio Coletti

The House of Intrigue is an Italian wartime espionage film released in 1956 under the Italian title of Londra Chiama Polo Nord (London calling North Pole). It was written and directed by Duilio Coletti. The film score was composed by Nino Rota.

== Synopsis ==
The film stars Philippe Hersent as Landers (code name North Pole), a British radio operator and cryptographer captured in occupied Holland. Under the watchful eye of Colonel Bernes (Curd Jurgens) and other Nazi officials he is forced to send false and misleading radio messages to London in an attempt to undermine British intelligence. This results in the capture of numerous British operatives and resistance fighters.

Meanwhile, in Britain Lt Mary Wintergreen, a pretty female officer (Dawn Addams), says goodbye to her agent boyfriend Cpt John Guinness (Dario Michaelis). Through the radio deception, John and other agents are captured. When John escapes he sends messages to Britain to contradict North Pole's messages but the German's send a balancing message saying that John Guinness himself is the double agent sending misleading information. When Guinness reaches Britain he is put on trial for treason and is sentenced to hang, partly on Mary's own evidence. In Holland the Dutch resistance leader, The Gorilla (Folco Lulli), leads an attempt to free the British agents from the abbey where they are imprisoned. This is unsuccessful and most of the resistance fighters are killed. The Gorilla meets secretly with Col Bernes and tries to trade a list of British agents for his own brother's release (Chris).

Mary sneaks into Holland and makes her way to a music shop in Amsterdam to try to track down Landers (and clear Guinness). She narrowly evades capture as the store owner is a double agent.

Chris is released, but his co-prisoners are allowed to watch his departure and suspect treachery. Mary, however is captured, and falls into the hands of Col Bernes. He shows pity on her as they had a previous affair in Barcelona and gives her free passage to the border. Owing to this unwarranted release Bernes is taken away for his own execution.

== Production ==
Filming on London CALLS North Pole began with studio recordings in Rome in October/November 1955, shooting continued in January 1956 with location recordings in Amsterdam and the surrounding area. The premiere took place in Italy on November 30, 1956, the German premiere was on July 27, 1957 in Stuttgart's Gloria-Palast.

== Reviews ==
Der Spiegel wrote: “The busy Curd Jürgens in his best role for a long time as a humane and efficient head of “defense” in occupied Holland: The plot … goes back to a factual report, and the military events on the underground front may well correspond to reality. Less likely appears a love story that is faded in, involving the German counter-intelligence chief and a British agent (Dawn Addams).”

== Cast ==
- Mark Landers - Philippe Hersent
- Col Bernes - Curd Jurgens
- Mary - Dawn Addams
- King Kong Kandren, the Gorilla - Folco Lulli
- Chris, leader of the captured agents - Matteo Spinola
- Henry - Giacomo Rossi Stuart
- Hermann - Rene Deltgen
- Herbert - Ludovico Ceriana
- Felix - Christopher Hofer
- Mac - Alphonse Mathis
- John Guiness - Dario Michaelis
- Official - Edoardo Toniolo
- Matt - Albert Lieven
