= Bankraub in der Rue Latour =

1961 film

- Directed by: Curd Jürgens
- Written by: Werner Bergold; Franz Geiger
- Starring: Curd Jürgens
- Cinematography: Paul Grupp
- Release date: 21 July 1961
- Running time: 96 minutes
- Country: West Germany
- Language: German

Bankraub in der Rue Latour is a 1961 West German comedy film directed by and starring Curd Jürgens.

== Cast ==
- Curd Jürgens as Cliff MacHardy
- Ingeborg Schöner as Maskottchen
- Charles Régnier as Camarro
- Klaus Kinski as Bex, Author
- Peer Schmidt as Alex
- Helmut Alimonta as Ganove
- Almut Berg as Marie-Louise
- Tania Corvin as Starlett
- Ursula Herking as Putzfrau
- Bum Krüger as Kassierer
- Carl Lange as Regisseur Bergström
- Christiane Nielsen as Gloria
- Fritz Remond as Manchette
- Otto Stern as Freddy, Mann mit Homburg
- Erika von Thellmann as Prinzessin Caraconne
- Herbert Weissbach as Bankdirektor
