= The Heroes Are Tired =

1955 film

- American poster
- Directed by: Yves Ciampi
- Screenplay by: Jean-Charles Tacchella
- Story by: Christiane Garnier; Yves Ciampi; Jacques-Laurent Bost
- Produced by: Jacques Bar; Artur Brauner; Raymond Froment
- Starring: Yves Montand; María Félix; Curt Jürgens
- Cinematography: Henri Alekan
- Edited by: Roger Dwyre
- Music by: Louiguy
- Production companies: CCC Film; Cila Films; Terra Films
- Distributed by: Pathé Consortium Cinéma; Herzog Filmverleih
- Release date: 5 September 1955
- Running time: 115 minutes
- Countries: France; West Germany
- Language: French

The Heroes Are Tired (French: Les héros sont fatigués, German: Die Helden sind müde) is a 1955 French-West German adventure drama film directed by Yves Ciampi and starring Yves Montand, María Félix and Curt Jürgens. It was shot at the Joinville Studios in Paris and on location in Anduze, Génicourt and at the Pontoise – Cormeilles Aerodrome. The film's sets were designed by the art director René Moulaert. For his performance Jürgens was awarded the Volpi Cup for Best Actor at the 16th Venice International Film Festival. It is also known by the alternative title Heroes and Sinners.

== Synopsis ==
In a country in Africa, a former French fighter pilot (Yves Montand) who became a bush pilot realises that he is smuggling a significant quantity of diamonds. He decides to sell them for his own benefit. Meanwhile, the diamond owner gets a former German fighter pilot (Curt Jürgens) to recover them. The two men become friends when they discover that they fought in the same place. They drink together and relive the good times of the war where they were heroes.

== Cast ==
- Yves Montand as Michel Rivière
- Curt Jürgens as Wolf Gerke
- María Félix as Manuella
- Jean Servais as François Séverin
- Elisabeth Manet as Nina
- Gert Fröbe as Hermann
- Hans Verner as Olsen
- Manolo Montez as Pépé
- Rudy Castell as Rudi
- Gordon Heath as Sidney
- Gérard Oury as Villeterre
- Harry-Max as Harry-Max

== Bibliography ==
- Walker-Morrison, Deborah. Classic French Noir: Gender and the Cinema of Fatal Desire. Bloomsbury Publishing, 2020.
- Miller, John (ed.) Halliwell's Film Guide. Scribner's, 1996.
