= Die Fastnachtsbeichte =

German novel about Mainz carnival tradition

First edition front cover (publ. S. Fischer Verlag)

Carnival confession (German: Die Fastnachtsbeichte), by Carl Zuckmayer, is one of the better-known examples of German literature regarding Mainz carnival. The novel was published first in English language, by John Geoffrey Gryles Mander and Necke Mander, in 1961 in London.

== Plot summary ==
During the afternoon of carnival Saturday 1913, a man wearing a dragoon's uniform enters Mainz Cathedral in order to confess. But even after his first sentence, he collapses dead. As it turns out he was stabbed in the neck with a thin dagger before he entered the cathedral, without his knowledge. On the evening of the same day, the Dragoons Lieutenant Jean Marie de Panezza, son of a wealthy and distinguished family of Mainz, receives a visit of his cousin Viola Moralto from Sicily, which he has not seen since childhood. Viola appears scared and seems surprised when Jean Marie introduces himself.

In a brothel in the Kappelhofstraße a drunken young man was arrested shortly after the murder. He made himself suspicious in that he carried a large amount of money and a pistol. This person called Clemens served also the Dragoons regiment. He is the son of a woman named Bäumler, who works occasionally for the family Panezza as an assistant and had been the wet nurse of Jean Marie. During the subsequent investigation, it turns out that the victim was Ferdinand, also a son of this woman. Ferdinand fled due to an embezzlement to the French Foreign Legion and died there supposedly. In fact, however, he had faked his death and had returned now to Mainz. Panezza admits a confidant that this was his illegitimate son Ferdinand, whom he fathered with Baumler, when she lived in the house as a nurse.

Ferdinand had pretended to be his brother Jean Marie after his desertion of the French Foreign Legion. Under this name he attended Viola in Sicily. Viola had last seen him as a child and is now madly in love with him. Having received her precious jewelry on false pretences, he disappears without a trace. Viola suspected that he was going to Mainz and followed him. On the journey she takes along a crooked man named Lolfo, who is the illegitimate son of a peasant woman conceived with her father and who is her devotee. In fact, Ferdinand went to Mainz to blackmail his father Panezza. He had first visited his brother Clemens, asking him to emigrate to America together with him. To avoid detection, he had swapped clothes with Clemens. So it is now Ferdinand to wear the uniform and Clemens to wear the suit with the money o the proceeds of the embezzled jewelry. Lolflo who arrives with Viola on the same day in Mainz recognized Ferdinand in the crowd. He follows him up to the front of the cathedral and stabs him there, jealousy and in revenge to Viola.
