= Tiny Yong =

- Also known as: Thien Huong
- Born: Tôn Nữ Thị Thiên Hương; 8 February 1944 (age 81); Phnom Penh, Protectorate of Cambodia, French Indochina
- Genres: Pop, yé-yé
- Occupation: Singer
- Years active: 1960–1970

Thiên Hương (born 8 February 1944), usually credited as Tiny Yong, is a singer who was popular in France during the 1960s. She was born in French Indochina, and is of Vietnamese ancestry.

== Biography ==
Tôn Nữ Thị Thiên Hương was born in Phnom Penh, the capital of Cambodia, within French Indochina at the time. Her father was a doctor. As a child, she and her family moved to Saigon, and she studied at the Couvent des Oiseaux in Đà Lạt. In 1958, the family moved to Paris, where her father continued as a doctor and her mother opened a Vietnamese restaurant.

Thien Huong took acting lessons, and made her first appearances as a stage actress in 1960, in Albert Camus' Les Justes and Jean Cocteau's L’Épouse injustement soupçonnée. She also sang Vietnamese and French songs in a local cabaret, La table du mandarin. In 1961, Thien Huong released her first EP, Le Monde de Suzie Wong, on which she was accompanied by Jacques Loussier. She appeared on television in the shows L’École des vedettes and Discorama, and in Robert Hossein's film Le Jeu de la vérité. With singer Jean Philippe, she recorded "La Prison de bambou", which won the Prix Marco Polo de Venise in 1962. The same year, she appeared in Piero Pierotti's film, Marco Polo, sang on the soundtrack of Marcel Camus' film L’Oiseau de paradis, and continued with her television and nightclub appearances.

In 1963, Jacqueline and Henri Salvador signed her to their record label, Disques Salvador, and gave her the name Tiny Yong. Her first release on the label included the songs "En rêve", a version of Roy Orbison’s "In Dreams", and "Tais-toi petite folle", a version of The Shirelles' "Foolish Little Girl", both of which became popular. They were followed by "Je ne veux plus t’aimer", her version of Goffin and King's "I Can't Stay Mad at You", first recorded by Skeeter Davis. Tiny Yong became popular on the radio show Salut les copains, which promoted her as one of the new wave of "yé-yé" singers, and several of her recordings became chart hits in France. She continued to appear regularly on French television, and in commercials, and became known as "la yéyé du pays du sourire" (although she did not come from Thailand, sometimes called the "land of smiles").

In 1964 she released the EP Je t’attendrai, which included "Les garçons m’aiment", a version of the Jeff Barry and Ellie Greenwich song "When the Boy’s Happy (The Girl’s Happy Too)". Another EP included "Tiny", a semi-autobiographical song, and she recorded several songs written by Henri Salvador, as well as a version of the Beatles' "Eight Days a Week" ("Huit jours par semaine"). She also appeared in the film Les Parias de la gloire, and in 1965 took part in the Rose d'Or contest. In April 1966 she made her last television appearance. She ended her recording career soon afterwards, following a disagreement with Jacqueline and Henri Salvador.

She appeared in Nicolas Gessner‘s 1967 film, La Blonde de Pékin. In 1968, she returned to Saigon where she performed in cabaret before deciding to retire from public performances. She returned to Paris in 1970, and made a final acting appearance in the television series Allô Police.

After retiring from the entertainment industry, she married and set up several restaurants, at first in Paris and later in Saint-Germain-des-Prés, Pont-sur-Yonne, and Montpellier. She continues to live in Montpellier.

A compilation of her recordings was issued on CD in 2017.
