= Les Parias de la gloire =

Les parias de la gloire
- Film poster
- Directed by: Henri Decoin
- Written by: Roger Delpey; Henri Decoin
- Produced by: Mario Mammolotti
- Starring: Maurice Ronet; Curd Jürgens; Folco Lulli
- Cinematography: Federico G. Larraya
- Edited by: Charles Bretoneiche
- Music by: Giovanni Fusco
- Production companies: Films Marly; Ocean Films; Paris-France-Films; Sagittario Film
- Distributed by: Gaumont Distribution
- Release date: 5 April 1964
- Running time: 100 minutes
- Countries: France; Italy; Spain
- Language: French

Les Parias de la Gloire English title Pariahs of Glory or Outcasts of Glory is a 1964 French/Italian/Spanish international co-production filmed in Spain. Directed and co-written by Henri Decoin, it is set during the First Indochina War and is based on the 1953 novel of the same name by Roger Delpey who also co-wrote the screenplay. Delpey served as an infantryman in the 151st Infantry Regiment from 1947–1949 in French Indochina then remained as a war correspondent writing four volumes of Soldats de Boue (Mud Soldiers).

== Plot ==
During World War II a young Frenchmen sees his brother killed in Alsace by a German officer. He vows revenge on all Germans, but after the War he is conscripted into the French Army and sent to Indochina. There he meets his brother's killer under strange circumstances.

== Cast ==
- Curd Jürgens ... Ludwig Goetz
- Maurice Ronet ... Ferrier
- Folco Lulli ... Blosky
- Roland Lesaffre ... La Coquille
- Germán Cobos ... Albertini
- Pedro Osinaga ... Bertaux
- Tiny Yong ... Chinese girl
