= They Call It Love =

1953 film

- Directed by: John Reinhardt
- Written by: Peter Berneis; John Reinhardt
- Starring: Winnie Markus; Curd Jürgens; Richard Häussler
- Cinematography: Gerhard Krüger
- Music by: Franz Grothe
- Production company: Oska-Film
- Distributed by: Union-Film
- Release date: 9 June 1953
- Running time: 90 minutes
- Country: West Germany
- Language: German

They Call It Love (German: Man nennt es Liebe) is a 1953 West German comedy film directed by John Reinhardt and starring Winnie Markus, Curd Jürgens and Richard Häussler. It was shot at the Bavaria Studios in Munich. The film's sets were designed by the art director Ludwig Reiber.

== Cast ==
- Winnie Markus as Maria West
- Curd Jürgens as Peter Malmö
- Richard Häussler as Erich Conti
- Hubert von Meyerinck as Balancourt
- Hans Leibelt as Carlos Schmidt
- Iván Petrovich as Gregory
- Hermann Pfeiffer as Kahle
- Helen Vita as Helene, Zimmermädchen
- Richard Gerlett as Bremer
- Oliver Hassencamp as Torgler
- Viktor Afritsch as Schweiger, Portier
- Lisa Stammer as Carmelita Schmidt
- Madelon Truß as Nadine
- Ursula Grabley as Irene, Modesalon-Inhaberin
- Dietrich Thoms as Roberto
- Herbert Weicker as Claude

== Bibliography ==
- Bock, Hans-Michael & Bergfelder, Tim. The Concise CineGraph. Encyclopedia of German Cinema. Berghahn Books, 2009.
