= Lambert Feels Threatened =

1949 film

- German release poster
- Directed by: Géza von Cziffra
- Written by: Géza von Cziffra
- Produced by: Karl Hofer
- Starring: Hannelore Schroth; Curd Jürgens; Leopold Rudolf
- Cinematography: Ludwig Berger
- Edited by: Henny Brünsch
- Music by: Hanns Elin
- Production company: Cziffra-Film
- Distributed by: Sascha Film
- Release date: 4 March 1949
- Running time: 87 minutes
- Country: Austria
- Language: German

Lambert Feels Threatened (German: Lambert fühlt sich bedroht) is a 1949 Austrian mystery crime film directed by Géza von Cziffra and starring Hannelore Schroth, Curd Jürgens and Leopold Rudolf. The film was one of only a handful of Austrian crime films produced in the post-war era, with similarities to American and British film noirs. It was shot at the Schönbrunn Studios in Vienna and on location around Pörtschach am Wörthersee. The film's sets were designed by the art director Fritz Jüptner-Jonstorff. It was given a West German release in September 1951.

== Synopsis ==
Lambert a reclusive man lives in isolated house in an island in the middle of a lake. He is obsessed with the idea that somebody wants to kill him, and appeals for police protection. Inspector Roland takes over the case and arrives on the fog-bound island, and soon encounters strange happenings and the death of the local doctor.

== Cast ==
- Hannelore Schroth as Maria
- Curd Jürgens as Roland
- Leopold Rudolf as Lambert
- Paul Kemp as Bobby
- Hermann Erhardt as Billert
- Julius Brandt as Arzt
- Erni Mangold
- Josef Zechell
- Carl Falkner
- Walter Sudra
- Teddy Kern

== Bibliography ==
- Fritsche, Maria. Homemade Men in Postwar Austrian Cinema: Nationhood, Genre and Masculinity. Berghahn Books, 2013.
