= Schinderhannes =

German outlaw

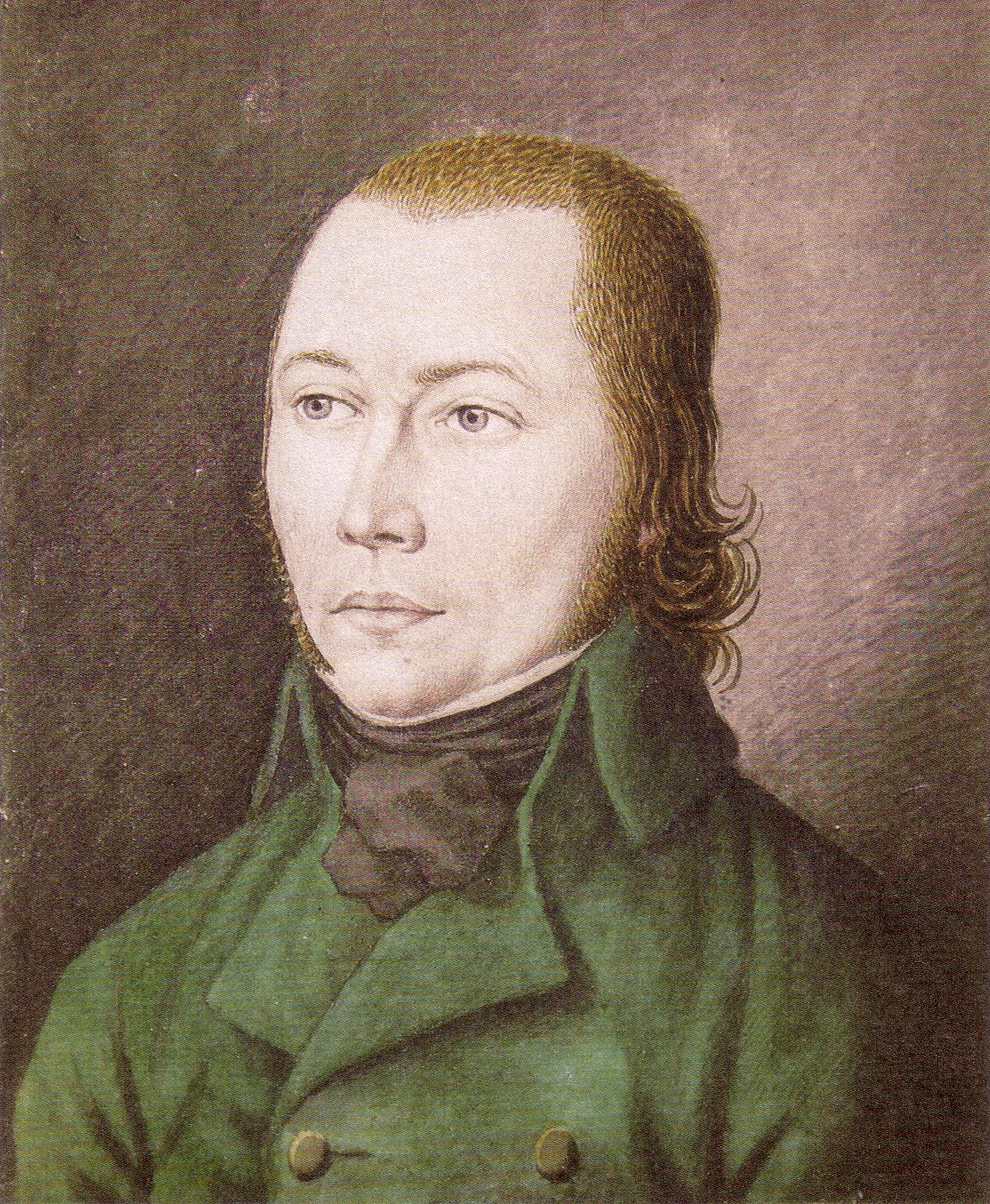
Johannes Bückler, Painting by K. H. Ernst (1803)

Johannes Bückler (c. 1778 – 21 November 1803; German pronunciation: [joˈhanəs ˈbʏklɐ]) was a German outlaw who orchestrated one of the most famous crime sprees in German history. He has been nicknamed Schinderhannes and Schinnerhannes (pronounced [ˈʃɪn(d)ɐˌhanəs]) in German and John the Scorcher, John the Flayer and the Robber of the Rhine in English. He was born at Miehlen, the son of Johann and Anna Maria Bückler. He began an apprenticeship to a tanner but turned to petty theft. At 16 he was arrested for stealing some of the skins, but he escaped detention. He then turned to break-ins and armed robbery on both sides of the Rhine, which was the border between France and the Holy Roman Empire.

The legend of Schinderhannes truly emerged from his escape from a prison tower in Simmern, a market town in the Hunsrück region of the Rhineland. At the time, the west bank of the Rhine was under French occupation, and the peasantry was happy to celebrate anyone who was able to flout the law. At the end of 1798, Bückler had a criminal record that included thefts of at least 40 head of cattle and horses. He was arrested by French gendarmerie and brought before a judge, where he confessed some of his crimes. Imprisoned in a wooden tower in Simmern that most believed to be impenetrable, he used a kitchen knife, smuggled in by a sympathetic guard, and cut a hole in a small window to escape. The prison escape became widely reported, exciting the public and making Schinderhannes a folk hero.

The legend of Schinderhannes grew with every new escapade. After things began to get too dangerous for him, Schinderhannes fled across the Rhine and enlisted in the Austrian Army under the assumed name of Jakob Schweikart. He was recognized, however, by a former associate, handed over to the French authorities and imprisoned in a tower of the medieval defensive wall of Mainz (the so-called "Holzturm"). After his mistress, Juliana Blasius, was threatened with being charged as an accomplice, Schinderhannes testified against his fellow gangsters. Nineteen of his associates were sentenced to death. Despite his cooperation, Schinderhannes was sentenced to death as well. On 21 November 1803 he was guillotined before the gates of Mainz. More than 40,000 spectators witnessed his execution. He remains Germany's most famous outlaw. His legend still attracts a great deal of tourism to the region wherein his gang operated.

== Origin ==
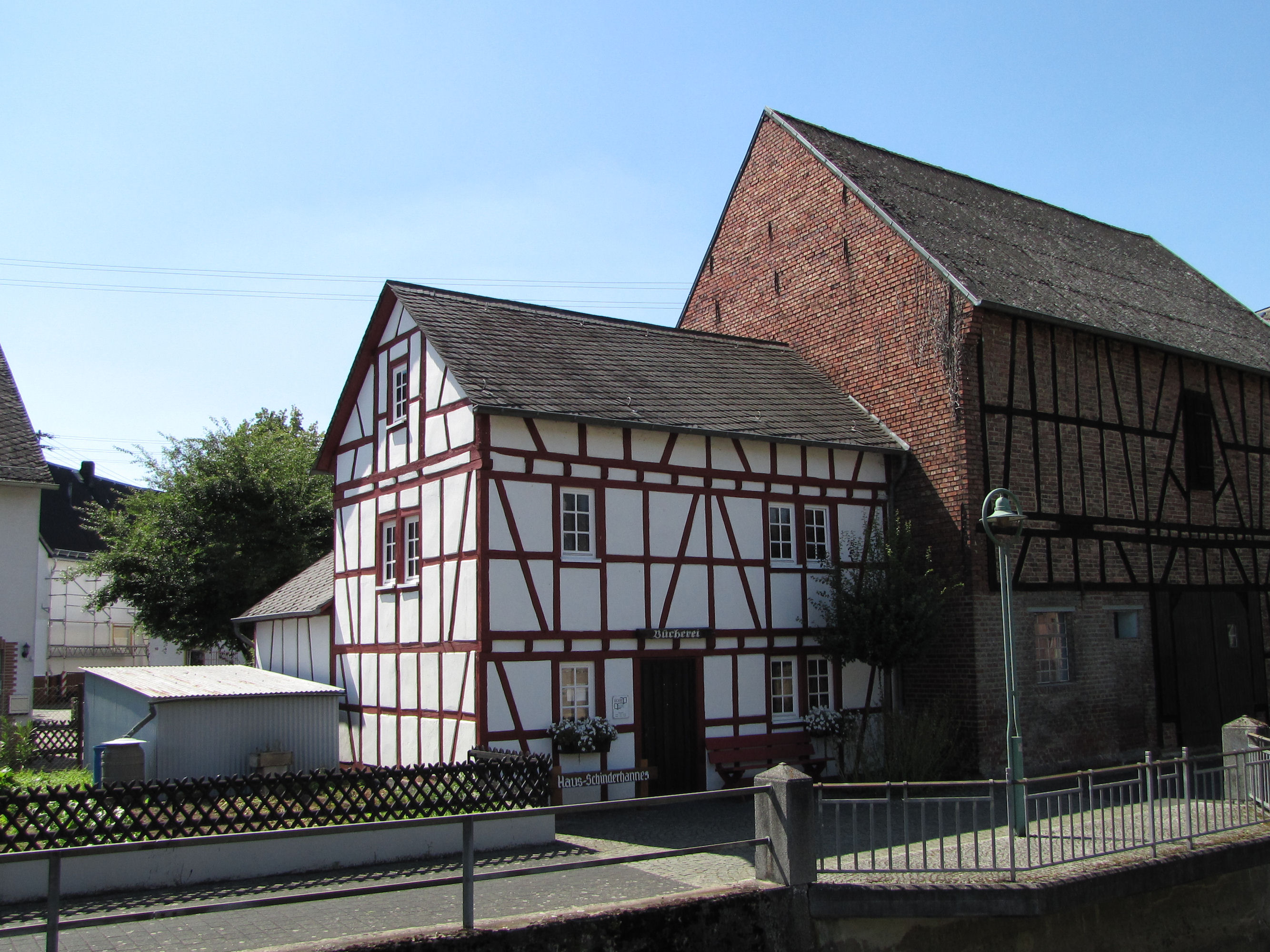
House of Schinderhannes in Miehlen

Johannes Bückler's oldest known ancestor was Sebastian Bickler, executioner and master tanner of Kirchberg and Koppenstein, who was engaged in the tanner's trade at the mill at Wallenbrück, which had fallen into decay after the Thirty Years' War. According to his son, Hans-Adam, he came from an old family of executioners and tanners. Hans-Adam (also Johann Adam) Bickler (1649–1720) continued both trades at the Wallenbrück after his certification on 13 November 1679. During the War of the Palatine Succession the French demanded a fee which he could not pay, so he was dismissed in 1693 and replaced by the executioner, Dillendorf, from Corray at Zell on the Moselle. In 1697, after the end of the war, Hans-Adam Bickler was able to return.

In 1673, Niclas Bickler, great-grandfather of Johannes Bückler, was born on the Wallenbrück as a son of Hans-Adam Bickler and his wife Margaretha, daughter of the skinner Coller of Bernkastel. He also stayed on site for the time being but left the family in 1703 and went to Hilscheid near Thalfang. After 1708, the Anterior County of Sponheim had been divided between Baden and Electoral Palatinate and the Wallenbrück had become the border town of Baden, more and more criminals and others sought by the courts sought refuge there. After the death of his father and serious inheritance disputes between him and his stepmother Eva Marie, Niclas Bickler succeeded in obtaining the deed of inheritance. However, one and a half years later, on 16 February 1722, the Kirchberg upper office reversed the decision; Eva Bickler now received the deed. As a result of further ruinous inheritance disputes, the Wallenbrück had to be auctioned on 31 August 1733. It went to the Naumburg executioner, Matthias Nagel, who passed it on to his son-in-law, Johann Leonard North, in 1738, who in turn let Johannes Bickler manage it.

Otto Philipp Bickler, Niclas' son, became an executioner in Wartelstein, today's Schloss Wartenstein near Kirn. In this position, he succeeded Mattias Nagel, a grandson of Matthias Nagel. Bickler went to Merzweiler in 1754. Later Johannes Bückler, Schinderhannes, learned the skinner's craft from Mattias Nagel. Nagel, who was also known as a wound healer, treated Bückler medically after attacks and outbreaks. Johannes Bückler's father, Johannes Bickler, was born in Merzweiler. He married Anna Maria Schmidt in Miehlen. Bückler's parents fled Miehlen in 1783 because of a forest crime and a laundry theft by his mother. In 1784, his father was recruited for six years by the Imperial Army. He served in Moravia, deserted in 1789 and returned first to his birthplace of Merzweiler.

== Life ==
=== Black Peter ===
One of Schinderhannes' accomplices was Peter Petri, nicknamed "Black Peter", who is described as a black-haired man who was as gentle as a lamb when sober, but became violent when drunk and no longer in control of himself. Polecat Jacob (Iltis-Jacob) and Reidenbach had already been his accomplices in numerous raids in the Hunsrück. When Petri and Polecat were on their way home from a christening with their wife, Petri and Jacob's wife remained a little behind and crawled into the grass. The passing Jewish cattle dealer, Simon Seligmann, from Seibersbach discovered the lovers and betrayed them to the aforementioned Polecat. He came back and strangled his unfaithful wife. Petri, however, could not forgive the Jew who had caught him at his tryst and betrayed him to Polecat. A little later he was with Johannes Bückler in the Thiergarten forester's lodge at Argenthal and celebrated with him and friends where they had ordered Jewish bankers to make music. Meanwhile, Seligmann passed the house with a cow and was seen by Petri. Petri asked Bückler to follow him. In pairs, they attacked the Jew and stabbed him repeatedly to death before plundering his body. Whether Johannes Bückler also murdered Seligmann could not be proven. A juridical review of all the records has shown that an accusation of murder could not be upheld against him.

=== Placken-Klos ===
At first, the gang was mainly up to no good in the then cantons of Kirn, (Bad) Sobernheim, Herrstein, Rhaunen, Kirchberg, Simmern and Stromberg. Later, its field of activity shifted to areas beyond Nahe. In the canton of Kirn, the robbers often stayed in at Hahnenbach and Schneppenbach. In Hahnenbach, Johannes Bückler had accommodated his lover, Elise Werner, with a "dirty old woman", Anne Marie Frey. Elise Schäfer from Faid lived in Schneppenbach with her 14-year-old daughter "Amie". This girl is described as intelligent, "not prim and fleshy to feel" and was courted by Bückler and Seibert along with some others. "Placken-Klos", who had given his Elise to Johannes Bückler, became jealous about it.

One day Placken-Klos came into the house of Elise and Amie and demanded the surrender of Amie to his "constant company". Amie, who was in love with Johannes Bückler, was able to defend herself successfully against this request, but had to hand over her clothes to Placken-Klos, who was looking for a way out. A little later Bückler appeared with Seibert, Fink and other journeymen with Elise and Amie and learned what had happened. They decided to visit the robber, and finally found him at the Baldenauer Hof near Morscheid, where he was killed by Seibert and Bückler on 22 December 1797. The murder of Placken-Klos by Johannes Bückler could also not be proven beyond doubt.

=== Imprisonment ===
By the time of his arrest in Simmern in February 1799, Bückler had committed more than 40 cattle and horse thefts.

Johannes Bückler returned to Wallenbrück around 1800, where he tried to steal horses from the mill now run by Conrad Weyrich. Another longer residence of Bückler was the settlement near Dickenschied Scheidbach.

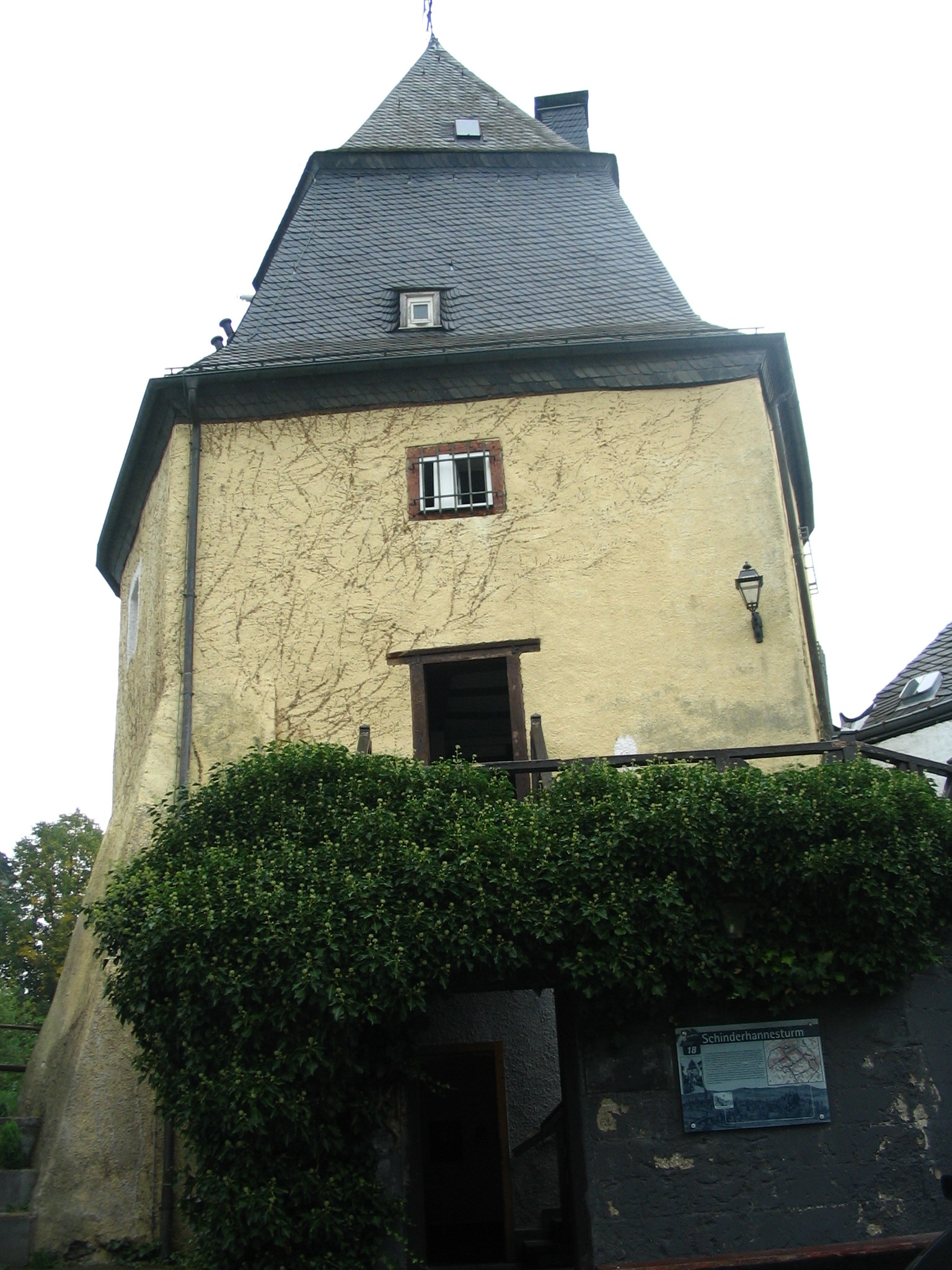
The Schinderhannes Tower in Simmern

At the end of February 1799, the Kirn gendarmerie were able to capture Johannes Bückler in Schneppenbach by surrounding the house of Elise and Amie and surprising him in his sleep. He was brought before the magistrate in Kirn, where he confessed to some of his crimes. With his companion, Johann Müller, he was taken to the prison tower in Simmern, where Elise was able to visit him twice. With the help of his friend, Philipp Arnold, who sat in the guard room, Johannes Bückler was able to flee on the night of 19/20 August 1799. The dungeon in the tower was in its round basement, which could only be reached from above through a hatch through which the prisoners were lowered and raised. The prisoners were also supplied through this hole with the most essential food. However, Bückler was not kept in this dungeon, but in a prison cell above it. Bückler cut through the door boards with a secretly hidden knife and glued them back together again with chewed bread as glue. When a good opportunity arose, he left the cell, broke through a kitchen window loosely barred with iron, and from there jumped from the first floor into the moat of the city wall, dislocating his leg or breaking his fibula.

=== Crime spree ===
After his escape from the tower at Simmern, Bückler turned mainly to robbery and extortion, because horse theft had become too burdensome and not profitable enough. He committed these acts with an average number of five accomplices. A large proportion of his criminal activity was directed against Jews, perhaps because attacks on Jews would result in negligible interference from the part rest of the population.

Locations:

- Around 1800 Johannes Bückler moved his "residence" to the semi-ruined castle of Schmidtburg in the Hahnenbach valley and used Schloss Kallenfels above Kirn, as an alternative base and observation post.

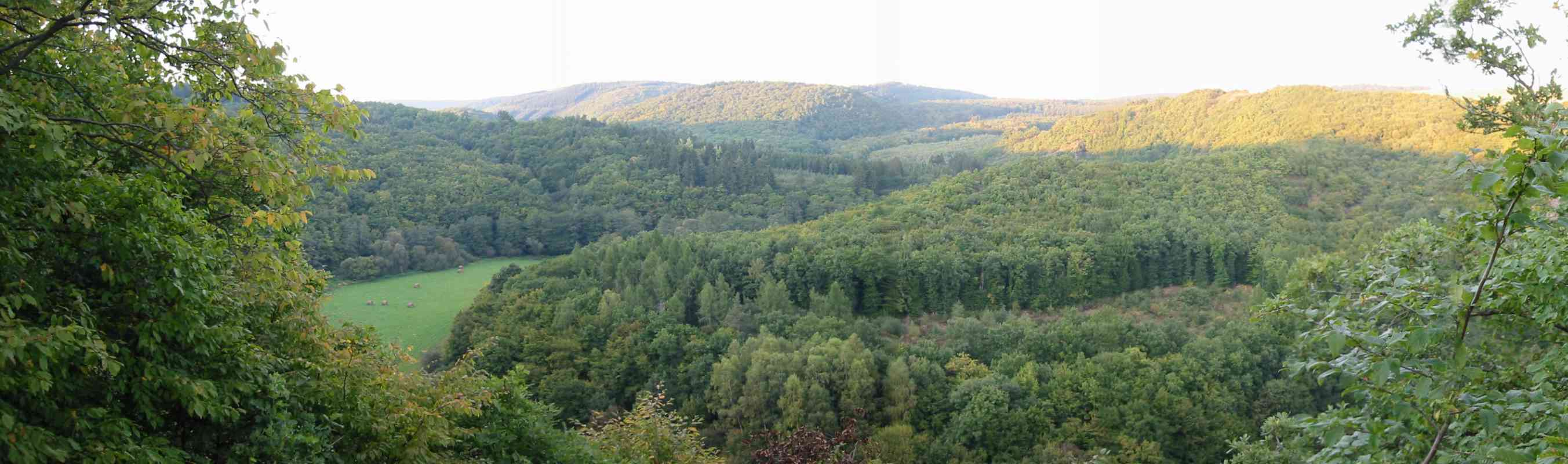
The Hahnenbach valley between Schneppenbach and Bundenbach

The local population were aware of the presence of the robbers in the whole of Kallenfels, Hahnenbach, Sonnschied and Griebelschied, but nothing was revealed to the authorities. In Griebelschied a so-called 'robber ball' was celebrated in August, where the robbers enjoyed the company of the women of the village. Perhaps it was a result of this cockiness that the gang, which had long been a focus of police interest, was able to be located. Numerous robberies followed, mainly against Jews. The robbers became more audacious and moved beyond their home area into the Saar area.

- In Wickenhof, after an armed street robbery (on 18 December 1799), Johannes Bückler got to know a woman called Julchen around Easter 1800. Julchen later became his wife and companion and also took part in his raids. Bückler had already had eight lovers before Julchen, four of whom are known by name: Elise Werner, Buzliese-Amie, Katharina Pfeiffer and Margarete Blasius.
- In Waldböckelheim Johannes Bückler attacked a coach on 5 January 1800.
- On 11 January 1800, Johannes Bückler committed a robbery in Otzweiler and then fled to the east bank of the Rhine. Bückler divided the booty from this and another robbery at Koppenstein Castle.
- On the hill ridge of Winterhauch south of Idar-Oberstein, Johannes Bückler committed highway robbery on 12 March 1800.
- On 16 March 1800, he robbed several Jewish merchants in Neubrücke.
- On 27 March 1800, Bückler committed an armed robbery in Steinhardt which resulted in a fatality.
- On 24 August 1800 he extorted protection money from the industrialist, Johann Ferdinand Stumm (1764–1839), one of the founders of the Gebrüder Stumm family business. This was followed by the same offence against all the Hottenbach Jews. In addition, Bückler robbed Wolff Wiener in Hottenbach.
- In November 1800 an attempt was made in Gräfenbacherhütte to extort more protection money.
- On 10 January 1801, Bückler attacked the post office in Würges (at Bad Camberg in Taunus). The Dutch Gang was also involved in this raid.
- On 28 January 1801, he committed a burglary in Merxheim (Near).
- On 15 April 1801, Johannes Bückler attacked a house in Laufersweiler during the night. The booty was taken into the tunnels of Lemberg near Oberhausen an der Nahe and divided up. The Oberhausen Ferry House (Oberhausener Fährhaus) became an important base for Bückler.
- On 25 May 1801, Bückler's gang got involved in a brawl with soldiers in Klein-Rohrheim (Hesse), in which Corporal Franz Kleb was shot.
- On 4 September 1801, the Jewish merchant, Mendel Löw, was robbed and murdered in Sötern.
- On 15 September 1801, there was a robbery in Staudernheim, then another in Waldgrehweiler. For the first time, there was resistance from the population.
- On 15 November 1801, Bückler's band of robbers was forced to flee after a raid.
- On 14 January 1802, they again extorted protection money, this time in Merxheim, and then again on 12 February in Neudorferhof near Lettweiler and on 20 March at Montforter Hof. This was Bückler's last documented crime.
- On 31 May 1802, Johannes Bückler was arrested at Wolfenhausen in the Taunus.

Among his companions were:

- Martin Schmitt, a Hungarian deserter whom he bound to himself by assigning his lover Elise to him. Schmitt was soon arrested in the canton of Zell and sentenced to six years imprisonment.
- Carl Benzel from Reichenbach near Baumholder, a violin player who was active at festivals, church consecrations and in taverns and who also financed his livelihood and love affairs with theft. Benzel, who had enjoyed a good education, distanced himself after the first atrocities of Johannes Bückler and hired himself out to the Mainzer Landsturm. After a few weeks, however, he deserted and visited Bückler again, who gave him a warm welcome. He remained with Bückler until his arrest, but was always plagued by remorse. After Benzel was also captured, he gave his lover Amie to Peter Zughetto. Benzel died on 24 February 1802 in Koblenz under the guillotine.
- Christoph Blümling from Laudert. He was arrested for a theft committed by Johannes Bückler and died in prison in Cologne.
- Peter Dallheimer from Sonnschied. He was executed in Trier under the guillotine.

In the time leading up to his final imprisonment, there were several murders which could possibly be attributed to Bückler. But based on the file material known today this was not sufficient to describe Johannes Bückler as a murderer.

In addition, there was a lack of gang coherence, to the extent that his accomplices changed almost daily. Although Bückler sometimes went around with certain persons for several weeks, again and again, he joined other henchmen (or they joined him); however, this cannot be described as a gang in the legal sense, in which several people agreed to commit crimes for a certain period of time. All in all, however, it can be ascertained that, in particular, the numerous tramps and vagrants tried to secure a subsistence living by thefts. Short-term associations were the rule. However, Bückler had acquired an increasingly important reputation in the course of 1800, so many people with dubious reputations were happy to join him or even stayed on guard without being asked when he was e.g. in a restaurant.

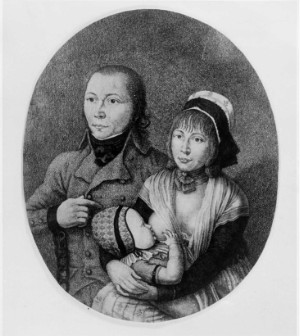
Bückler and Juliana Bläsius with their child

As the new century began, the French police system gradually began to take effect. In 1800, Johannes Bückler also came under the lens of law enforcement agencies on a supra-regional level, according to a decree by the General Government Commissioner, Jean-Baptiste-Moïse Jollivet, so that under the pseudonym of Jakob Ofenloch he began a travelling shopkeeper's trade in the lands on the bank of the Rhine.

=== Arrest and fate ===
On 31 May 1802, he was tracked down in the eastern Hinter Taunus between Wolfenhausen and Haintchen by the Electorate of Trier's manorial court councillor and official administrator of Limburg a.d. Lahn, Mr. Fuchs, at dawn with troops from Niederselters. When they were still a quarter of an hour away from Wolfenhausen, they saw a person walking out of a cornfield onto the road 300 paces away. The troops felt he was acting oddly and he was immediately arrested. At that time it was not known that the stranger was Schinderhannes. Rather, Johannes Bückler had been expelled from Wolfenhausen by a patrol two days earlier and had been picked up again by the same patrol and then arrested. He was led to Wolfenhausen, where the lieutenant and patrol for Wied-Runkel were based. From there he was taken to Runkel. With the statement that he, Jakob Schweikard, as he called himself, wanted to report for military service, he tried to secure his release. He was taken from Runkel to Limburg to Haus Rütsche 5, the seat of the recruitment office, under light surveillance. At that time it was still not known that this man was Johannes Bückler. The light guard had more to do with his wish of the army service, because many of the volunteers had made off with the hand money. Only in Limburg was he betrayed by a man named Zerfass from the long hedge, today Villmar-Langhecke, and after a short detention in the basement of the recruiting office, under heavy guard, he was transferred to the imperial city of Frankfurt am Main.

At that time, Bückler's determination to lead a robber's life was wavering. He promised the imperial authorities to provide information about all his crimes as long as he was not extradited to the French authorities who had occupied the Electorate of Trier, west of the Rhine, since 1801. After several thorough interrogations, however, he was handed over to the authorities with Julchen and some accomplices on 16 June 1802 and they were taken to French-occupied Mainz.

After being handed over, Bückler was imprisoned in the Wooden Tower of Mainz and subjected during the 16-month preliminary investigation by Johann Wilhelm Wernher to several dozen individual interrogations, during which 565 questions were asked. In addition, there were numerous identity parades. The court upheld Bückler's plea for a merciful sentence and was thus able to elicit an extensive confession from him. Without incriminating himself with violent offences, he named well over 100 persons who were connected with his crimes. With him, a further 19 accomplices were sentenced to death by a total of 68 defendants.

==== Trial ====
The trial began on 24 October 1803 and attracted a large crowd. Three defendants had already died in custody. The reading of the 72-page indictment in German and French took one and a half days. The trial was chaired by Georg Friedrich Rebmann, the president of the Mainz Criminal Court. The trial took place in the then-academy hall of the former Electoral Palace in Mainz. 400 witnesses were questioned. The employment of professional judges, officers, interpreters and defence lawyers allows the conclusion to be drawn that, at least in rudimentary terms, there was a safeguarding of the rule of law and the public in today's sense. Between 1803 and 1811, Georg Friedrich von Rebmann was the presiding judge at the Mainz Special Court.

After the conclusion of the proceedings, there were 20 acquittals, 18 were given prison sentences in chains or were exiled, and 20 were sentenced to death. The accused were charged with various offences, including vagrancy and coercion, attempted burglary and theft, food theft and fraud, cattle theft, burglary, extortion, handling stolen goods, grievous bodily harm resulting in death, murder and robbery.

==== Execution ====
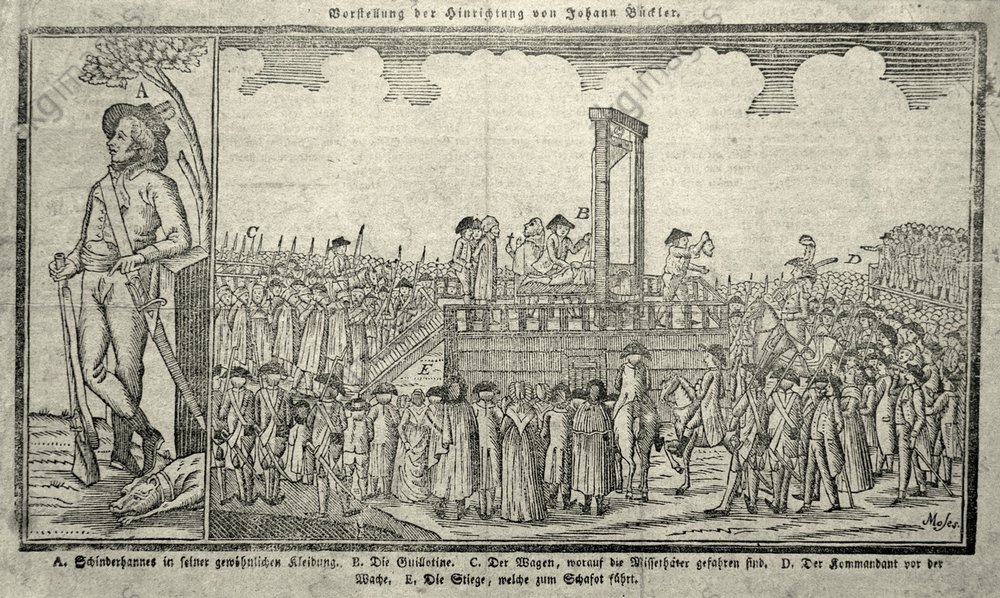
Contemporary woodcut of Bückler's execution

Bückler was sentenced to death on the basis of the statutory provision which provided for the death penalty for armed burglaries. The verdict had already been reached before the start of the main trial, since the court had already invited friends and acquaintances to the execution on 21 November 1803 in October.

Johann Bückler's father was sentenced to 22 years in chains, but died after a few weeks on 28 December 1803. Julchen Blasius served two years in prison. She gave birth to Bückler's son, Franz Wilhelm, before the trial on 1 October 1802. His direct descendants still live in the Taunus today.

The sentencing of Bückler and 19 of his followers to death by guillotine was announced on 20 November 1803. Because of the large crowd (about 30,000 onlookers) the guillotine was not constructed, as was usual, near the Gau Gate (Gautor), but outside the walls directly in front of the New Gate (Neutor). On 21 November 1803, the condemned were driven in five open wagons to the public place of execution. Bückler was the first to be led to the scaffold. Seconds later the execution was completed. 24 minutes after the first execution, it was all over.

After the severed heads had fallen, by means of a device into the lower, covered part of the scaffold and first examinations had been made, their bodies were taken to a nearby barracks built especially for this purpose. Professors of the École Supérieure in Mainz (formerly the university) and scientists of the Mainz Private Medical Association (Medizinische Privatgesellschaft zu Mainz) carried out inter alia investigations with electricity in order to test whether decapitated persons still showed sensations. Because of these investigations, the true location of Bückler's body can no longer be determined. Although today in the anatomical collection of the University of Heidelberg there is a skeleton with the inscription Schinderhannes, this skeleton is missing Bückler's known arm and leg fracture, it also has a different body size and has had a different skull since 1945. According to an evaluation of the contemporary medical reports, Bückler also had the last stage of tuberculosis in his chest.

== Popular culture ==
In 1832, Leitch Ritchie wrote the novel Schinderhannes: the Robber of the Rhine based on the life of the outlaw. Guillaume Apollinaire dedicated a poem to him in his collection Alcools (1913). He has been known as the German Robin Hood and his story romanticised by a Carl Zuckmayer play Schinderhannes and several films including The Prince of Rogues (1928) in which he is played by Hans Stüwe. In Czechoslovak TV series Slavné historky zbojnické (1985), Schinderhannes is played by Czech actor Miroslav Vladyka. In 2009, Clicker Games brought out a board game called Schinderhannes by German game designer Stephan Riedel, in which players have to solve the highwayman's crimes using clue cards and counters. His name has been given to the card game of Schinderhannes.

== Literature ==
- Chambers, Robert, ed. (1879). "Schinderhannes (John the Scorcher)". The Book of Days. Vol. 2. London: W & R Chambers.
- Hugo, Victor (1845). The Rhine. New York: Wiley & Putnam.
- Ritchie, Leitch (1833). Schinderhannes: the Robber of the Rhine. London: Smith, Elder and Co.
