= The Blue Mauritius (1918 film) =

1918 film

- Directed by: Viggo Larsen
- Starring: Harry Liedtke; Käthe Dorsch
- Production company: Messter Film
- Release date: 1918
- Country: Germany
- Languages: Silent; German intertitles

The Blue Mauritius (German: Die blaue Mauritius) is a 1918 German silent film directed by Viggo Larsen and starring Harry Liedtke and Käthe Dorsch.

== Cast ==
- Harry Liedtke
- Käthe Dorsch
- Georg Baselt
- Werner Bernhardy
- Hugo Fischer-Köppe
- Grete Hollmann
- Ria Jende
- Viggo Larsen
- Hedwig Lehmann
- Berthold Rose
- Elsa Wagner

== Bibliography ==
- Bock, Hans-Michael; Bergfelder, Tim, eds. (2009). The Concise Cinegraph: Encyclopaedia of German Cinema. New York: Berghahn Books. ISBN 978-1-57181-655-9.
