= Carl Zuckmayer =

German writer and playwright (1896–1977)

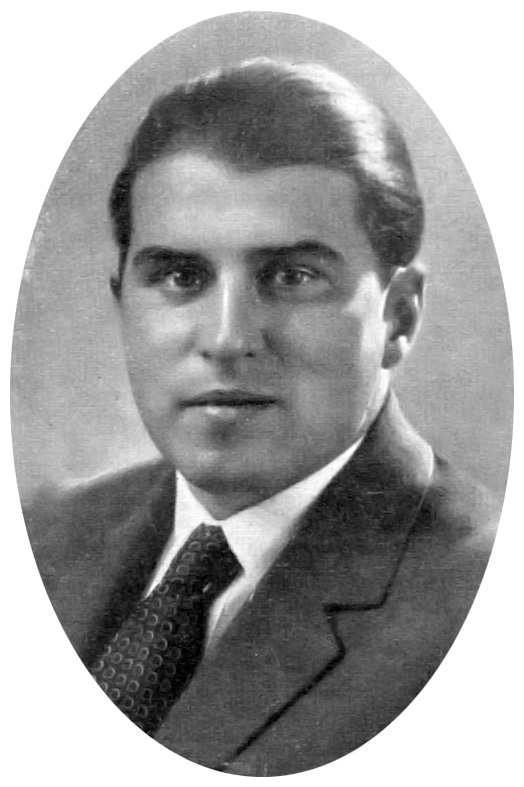
- Zuckmayer in 1920
- Born: 27 December 1896; Nackenheim, Rhenish Hesse, Germany
- Died: 18 January 1977 (aged 80); Visp, Valais, Switzerland
- Resting place: Saas-Fee, Valais, Switzerland
- Citizenship: German; American; Swiss
- Occupations: Writer; playwright
- Writing career
- Language: German
- Notable awards: Goethe Prize; Bundesverdienstkreuz; Staatspreis für Literatur; Pour le Mérite; Verdienstkreuz am Band, et al.

Carl Zuckmayer (27 December 1896 – 18 January 1977) was a German writer and playwright. His older brother was the pedagogue, composer, conductor, and pianist Eduard Zuckmayer.

His first two dramas were failures. In 1929, he wrote the script for the movie Der blaue Engel, for which he received the Georg Büchner Prize. He also wrote plays, including The Captain of Köpenick (1931), Des Teufels General (1946), Barbara Blomberg. Ein Stück in drei Akten (1949), and Kranichtanz. Ein Akt (1967).

Zuckmayer was a recipient of numerous awards and prizes, including the Kleist Prize, Medal of the city of Göttingen, the Grand Austrian State Prize for Literature, and the Ring of Salzburg.

== Life and career ==
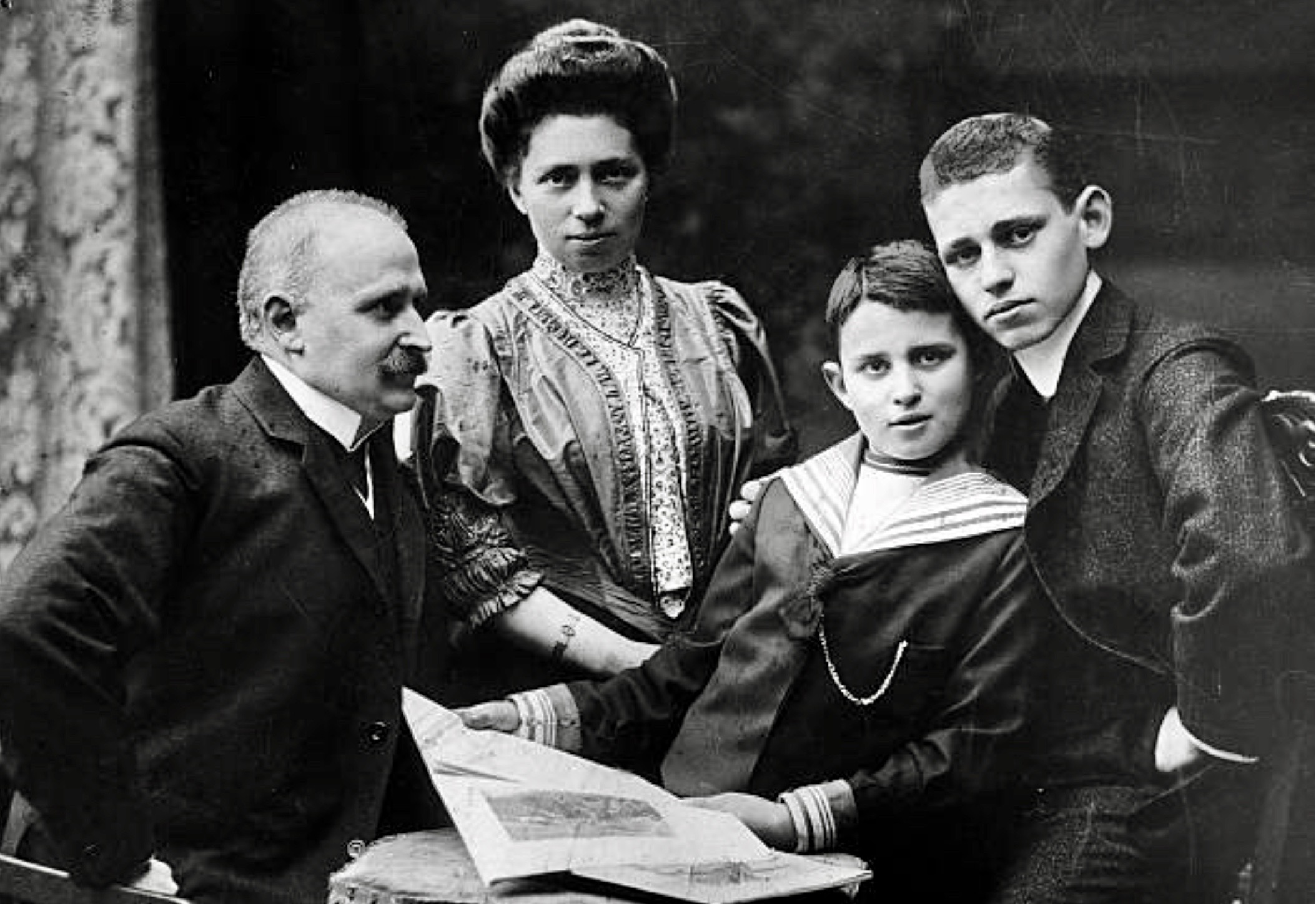
The Zuckmayer family in July 1906, from left to right: Carl Sr., Amalie, Carl Jr., Eduard

Born in Nackenheim in Rhenish Hesse, he was the second son of Amalie (1869–1954), née Goldschmidt, and Carl Zuckmayer (1864–1947). When he was four years old, his family moved to Mainz. With the outbreak of World War I, he (like many other high school students) finished Rabanus-Maurus-Gymnasium with a facilitated "emergency" Abitur and volunteered for military service.

During the war, he served with the German Army's field artillery on the Western Front. In 1917, he published his first poems in the pacifist journal Die Aktion and he was one of the signatures of the "Appeal" published by the Antinational Socialist Party after the German Revolution of 9 November 1918. By this time, Zuckmayer held the rank of a Leutnant der Reserve (Reserve Officer).

After the war, he took up studies at the University of Frankfurt, first in humanities, later in biology and botany. In 1920, he married his childhood friend Annemarie Ganz, but they were divorced just one year later, when Zuckmayer had an affair with actress Annemarie Seidel.

Zuckmayer's initial ventures into literature and theatre were complete failures. His first drama, Kreuzweg (1921), fell flat and was delisted after only three performances, and when he was chosen as dramatic adviser at the theatre of Kiel, he lost his new job after his first, controversial staging of Terence's The Eunuch.

In 1924, he became a dramaturge at the Deutsches Theater in Berlin, jointly with Bertolt Brecht. After another failure with his second drama, Pankraz erwacht oder Die Hinterwäldler, he finally had a public success with the rustic comedy Der fröhliche Weinberg (The Merry Vineyard) in 1925, written in his local Mainz-Frankfurt dialect. This work won him the prestigious Kleist Prize two years after it was awarded to Brecht, and launched his career.

Also in 1925, Zuckmayer married the Austrian actress Alice Herdan, and they bought a house in Henndorf, near Salzburg, in Austria. Zuckmayer's next play, Der Schinderhannes, was again successful.

In 1929, he wrote the script for the movie Der blaue Engel (starring Marlene Dietrich), based on the novel Professor Unrat by Heinrich Mann. That year, he was also awarded the Georg Büchner Prize, another prestigious German-language literary award.

In 1931, his play Der Hauptmann von Köpenick premiered and became another success, but his plays were prohibited when the Nazis came to power in Germany in 1933 (Zuckmayer's maternal grandfather had been born Jewish and converted to Protestantism).

Zuckmayer and his family moved to their house in Austria, where he published a few more works. After the Anschluss, he was expatriated by the Nazi government, and the Zuckmayers fled via Switzerland to the United States in 1939, where he first worked as a script writer in Hollywood before renting Backwoods Farm near Barnard, Vermont in 1941 and working there as a farmer until 1946.

In 1943–44, Zuckmayer wrote "character portraits" of actors, writers, and other artists in Germany for the Office of Strategic Services, evaluating their involvement with the Nazi regime. This became known only in 2002, when the approximately 150 reports were published in Germany under the title Geheimreport. The family's Vermont years are narrated in Alice Herdan-Zuckmayer's Die Farm in den grünen Bergen ("The Farm in the Green Mountains"), a bestseller in Germany upon its 1949 publication.

In January 1946, after World War II, Zuckmayer was granted the US citizenship he had applied for already in 1943. He returned to Germany and traveled the country for five months as a US cultural attaché. The resulting report to the War Department was first published in Germany in 2004 (Deutschlandbericht). His play Des Teufels General ("The Devil's General"; the main character is based on the biography of Ernst Udet), which he had written in Vermont, premiered in Zürich on 14 December 1946. The play became a major success in post-war Germany; one of the first post-war literary attempts to broach the issue of Nazism. It was filmed in 1955 and starred Curd Jürgens.

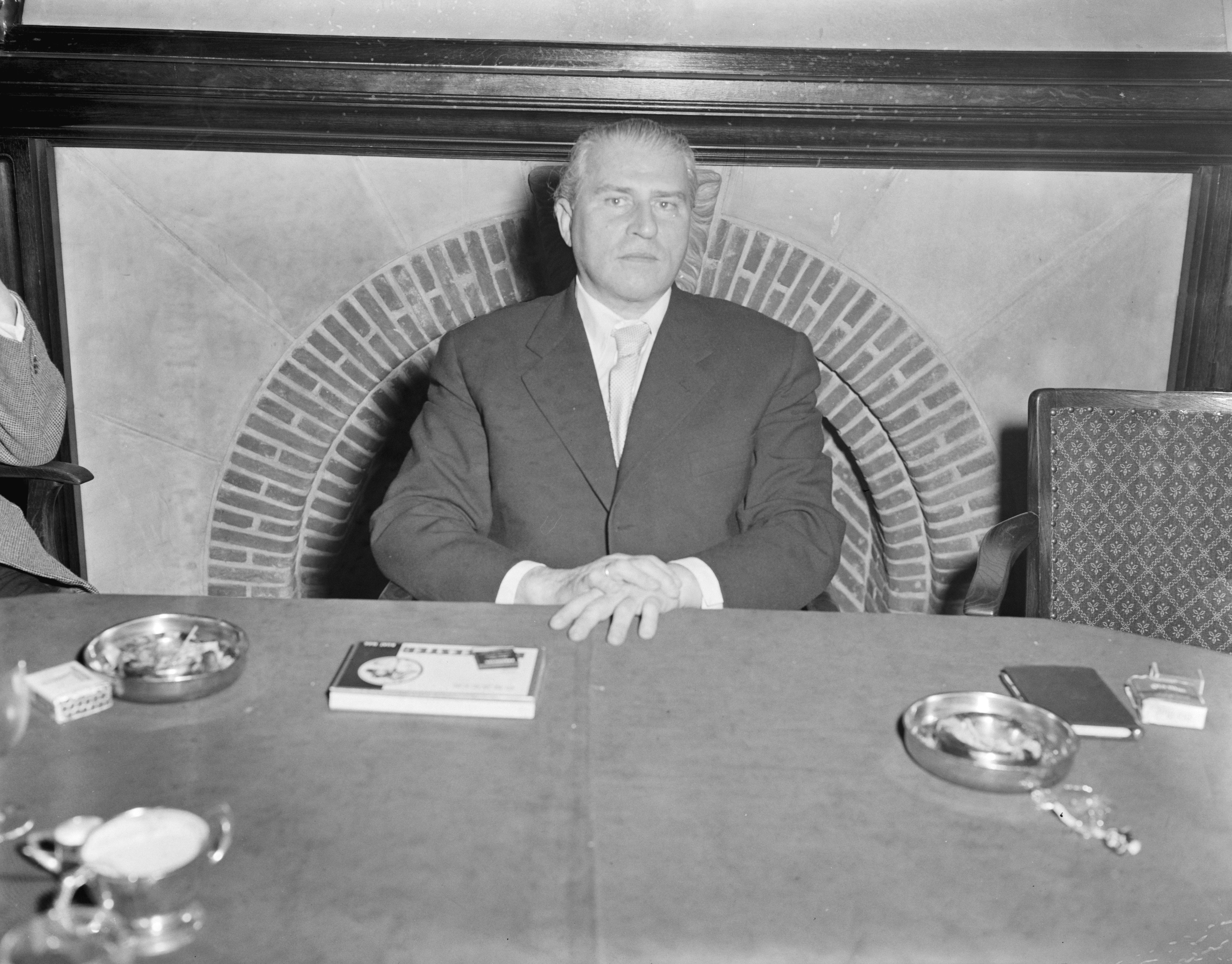
Zuckmayer in Amsterdam (1956)

Zuckmayer kept writing: Barbara Blomberg premiered in Konstanz in 1949 and Das kalte Licht in Hamburg in 1955. He also wrote the screenplay for Die Jungfrau auf dem Dach, the German-language version of Otto Preminger's 1953 film The Moon is Blue. Having shuttled back and forth between the U.S. and Europe for several years, the Zuckmayers left the U.S. in 1958 and settled in Saas Fee in the Valais in Switzerland. In 1966, he became a Swiss citizen, and published his memoirs, titled Als wär's ein Stück von mir ("A part of myself"). His last play, Der Rattenfänger, (music by Friedrich Cerha) premiered in Zürich in 1975. Zuckmayer died on 18 January 1977 in Visp. His body was interred on 22 January in Saas Fee.

Zuckmayer received numerous awards during his life, such as the Goethe Prize of the city of Frankfurt in 1952, the Bundesverdienstkreuz mit Stern in 1955, the Austrian Staatspreis für Literatur in 1960, Pour le Mérite in 1967, and the Austrian Verdienstkreuz am Band in 1968.

== Translations ==
- The Moons Ride Over (New York, The Viking Press, 1937, Original title Salwàre oder Die Magdalena von Bozen)
- Second Wind (London: George Harrap & Co., 1941) with an introduction by Dorothy Thompson. His first autobiographical volume, the book covered his youth, his experiences in World War I, and his flight from Austria to America after the Anschluss.
- A Part of Myself, Portrait of an Epoch (New York, Harcourt Brace Jovanovich, Inc., 1970, translated by Winston, Richard and Clara), originally Als wär's ein Stück von mir. Horen der Freundschaft, is an expanded memoir including his experiences in Vermont.
- Des Teufels General appeared in Block, Haskell M. and Shedd, Robert G. Masters of Modern Drama (New York, Random House, 1963) translated by Ingrid G. and William F. Gilbert, and is part of The German Library.
- The Captain of Köpenick appears in German Drama
- A Late Friendship: The Letters of Karl Barth and Carl Zuckmayer (Grand Rapids, Michigan, William B. Eerdmans Publishing Company, 1982, translated by Geoffrey W. Bromiley)
- Die Fastnachtsbeichte (Carnival Confession) published in English first, by John Geoffrey Gryles Mander and Necke Mander, in 1961 in London.

== Honours and awards ==
- 1925: Kleist Prize
- 1929: Georg Büchner Prize
- 1952: Goethe Prize of the city of Frankfurt am Main
- 1952: Honorary Citizenship of his birthplace, Nackenheim
- 1953: Medal of the city of Göttingen
- 1955: Knight Commander's Cross of the Order of Merit of the Federal Republic of Germany (Großes Verdienstkreuz mit Stern)
- 1955: German wine culture prize
- 1957: Honorary doctorate from the University of Bonn
- 1960: Grand Austrian State Prize for Literature
- 1961: Honorary Citizenship of Saas Fee
- 1962: Honorary Citizenship of Mainz
- 1967: Freeman of the Heidelberg University
- 1967: Pour le Mérite for Sciences and Arts
- 1968: Austrian Decoration for Science and Art
- 1971: Honorary Ring of Vienna
- 1972: Heinrich Heine Prize of the city of Düsseldorf
- 1975: Ring of Salzburg

== Selected plays ==
- Der fröhliche Weinberg (1925)
- Schinderhannes (1927)
- Katharina Knie (1928)
- The Captain of Köpenick (1931)
- Des Teufels General (1946)
- Barbara Blomberg. Ein Stück in drei Akten (1949)
- Der Gesang im Feuerofen. Drama in drei Akten (1950)
- Das kalte Licht. Drama in drei Akten (1955)
- Die Uhr schlägt eins. Ein historisches Drama aus der Gegenwart (1961)
- Kranichtanz. Ein Akt (1967)
- Das Leben des Horace A. W. Tabor. Ein Stück aus den Tagen der letzten Könige (Life of Horace Tabor, written 1962–1964)
- Der Rattenfänger. Eine Fabel (1975); later set as the opera Der Rattenfänger by Friedrich Cerha (1987)

== Filmography ==
- The Merry Vineyard, directed by Jacob Fleck and Luise Fleck (1927, based on the play Der fröhliche Weinberg)
- The Prince of Rogues, directed by Curtis Bernhardt (1928, based on the play Schinderhannes)
- Katharina Knie, directed by Karl Grune (1929, based on the play Katharina Knie)
- The Captain from Köpenick, directed by Richard Oswald (1931, based on the play The Captain of Köpenick)
- Menschen, die vorüberziehen, directed by Max Haufler (1942, based on the play Katharina Knie)
- The Captain from Köpenick, directed by Richard Oswald (1945, based on the play The Captain of Köpenick)
- After the Storm, directed by Gustav Ucicky (1948, based on the stort story Nach dem Sturm)
- Der Seelenbräu, directed by Gustav Ucicky (1950, based on the stort story Der Seelenbräu)
- The Merry Vineyard, directed by Erich Engel (1952, based on the play Der fröhliche Weinberg)
- A Love Story, directed by Rudolf Jugert (1954, based on the stort story Eine Liebesgeschichte)
- Herr über Leben und Tod, directed by Victor Vicas (1955, based on the novel Herr über Leben und Tod)
- Des Teufels General, directed by Helmut Käutner (1955, based on the play Des Teufels General)
- The Girl from Flanders, directed by Helmut Käutner (1956, based on the play Engele von Loewen)
- The Captain from Köpenick, directed by Helmut Käutner (1956, based on the play The Captain of Köpenick)
- Frauensee, directed by Rudolf Jugert (1958, based on the stort story Ein Sommer in Österreich)
- Der Schinderhannes, directed by Helmut Käutner (1958, based on the play Schinderhannes)
- Carnival Confession, directed by William Dieterle (1960, based on the novel Die Fastnachtsbeichte)
- Der Hauptmann von Köpenick, directed by Frank Beyer (TV film, 1997, based on the play The Captain of Köpenick)

=== Screenwriter ===
- 1926: Torments of the Night (dir. Curtis Bernhardt)
- 1930: The Blue Angel (dir. Josef von Sternberg), based on Professor Unrat by Heinrich Mann
- 1931: Salto Mortale (dir. E. A. Dupont), based on a novel by Alfred Machard
- 1936: Rembrandt (dir. Alexander Korda)
- 1939: Boefje (dir. Douglas Sirk), based on a children's book by Marie Joseph Brusse
- 1940: Sarajevo (dir. Max Ophüls)
- 1953: Die Jungfrau auf dem Dach (dir. Otto Preminger), based on a play by F. Hugh Herbert

== See also ==
- Carl Zuckmayer Medal
- 8058 Zuckmayer, asteroid named for the writer
