= Curd Jürgens =

German-Austrian stage and film actor (1915–1982)

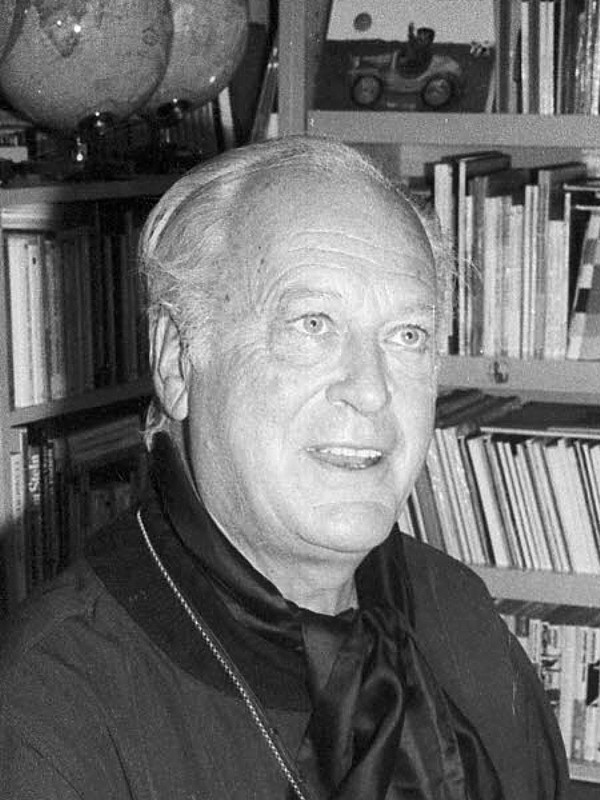
- Jürgens in 1976
- Born: Curd Gustav Andreas Gottlieb Franz Jürgens; 13 December 1915; Solln, Kingdom of Bavaria, German Empire
- Died: 18 June 1982 (aged 66); Vienna, Austria
- Occupation: Actor
- Years active: 1935–1982
- Spouses: Lulu Basler (m. 1938; div. 1947); Judith Holzmeister (m. 1947; div. 1955); Eva Bartok (m. 1955; div. 1956); Simone Bicheron (m. 1958; div. 1977); Margie Schmitz (m. 1978)
- Awards: Volpi Cup for Best Actor; 1955 The Heroes Are Tired

Curd Gustav Andreas Gottlieb Franz Jürgens (13 December 1915 – 18 June 1982) was a German-Austrian stage and film actor. He was usually billed in English-speaking films as Curt Jurgens. He was best known for playing a Luftwaffe General based upon Ernst Udet in Des Teufels General. His English-language roles include James Bond villain Karl Stromberg in The Spy Who Loved Me (1977), Éric Carradine in And God Created Woman (1956), and Professor Immanuel Rath in The Blue Angel (1959), and a war-weary U-boat captain in The Enemy Below (1957).

== Early life ==
Jürgens was born on 13 December 1915 in the Munich borough of Solln, Kingdom of Bavaria, German Empire. His father, Kurt, was a trader from Hamburg, and his mother, Marie-Albertine, was a French teacher. He had two elder twin sisters, Jeanette and Marguerite. He began his working career as a journalist before becoming an actor at the urging of his actress wife, Louise Basler. He spent much of his early acting career on the stage in Vienna. Due to serious injuries that he sustained in a car accident in the summer of 1933, he was unable to have children.

== Early films ==
Jurgens made his film debut in The Royal Waltz (1935) playing Franz Joseph I of Austria. He was in the comedy Family Parade (1935) and had a small part in The Unknown (1936), Love Can Lie (1937) and Tango Notturno (1937).

=== World War Two ===
During the war, Jurgens appeared in Operetta (1940) (playing Carl Millöcker), Whom the Gods Love (1942) (as Joseph II, Holy Roman Emperor), and Women Are No Angels (1943).

Jürgens was critical of Nazism in his native Germany. In 1944, after filming Wiener Mädeln, he got into an argument with Robert Kaltenbrunner (brother of high-ranking Austrian SS official Ernst Kaltenbrunner), SS-Obersturmbannführer Otto Skorzeny and a member of Baldur von Schirach's staff in a Viennese bar without knowing who they were. After this event, Jürgens was sent to a labor camp for the "politically unreliable" in Hungary. After a few weeks he managed to escape and went into hiding. Jürgens became an Austrian citizen after the war.

== Post-war career ==
After the war Jurgens appeared in The Singing House (1948) and The Angel with the Trumpet (1948). He had a romantic lead in On Resonant Shores (1948) and was in The Heavenly Waltz (1948), Lambert Feels Threatened (1949), and Bonus on Death (1950).

Jurgens was now regularly in starring roles: Der Schuß durchs Fenster (1950), Kissing Is No Sin (1950), The Disturbed Wedding Night (1950), and A Rare Lover (1950). He had a support role in House of Life (1952), 1. April 2000 (1952), Rose of the Mountain (1952), They Call It Love (1953), and Music by Night (1953). Jurgens was in an operetta, The Last Waltz (1953) with Eva Bartok, whom he married. He starred in Everything for Father (1954), and A Woman of Today (1954). Another movie with Bartok, Circus of Love (1954) was a co production with a US company. After Prisoners of Love (1954) he did another co production, Orient Express (1954) and then was in The Confession of Ina Kahr (1955).

=== International star ===
Jurgens's breakthrough screen role was in Des Teufels General (1955, The Devil's General) a fictional portrayal of World War I flying ace and World War II Luftwaffe general Ernst Udet. He was then in Love Without Illusions (1955) and Die Ratten (1955), directed by Robert Siodmak and starring Maria Schell. The Heroes Are Tired (1955) was a co production with France co starring Yves Montand. Devil in Silk (1956) co starred Lili Palmer.

Jurgens made The Golden Bridge (1956) then Without You All Is Darkness (1956) with Bartok. He had a lead part Roger Vadim's film Et Dieu... créa la femme (And God Created Woman) starring Brigitte Bardot, which was a huge box office success internationally. After an Italian movie The House of Intrigue (1956) Jurgens played the title role in Michel Strogoff (1956) which was another big hit, the most popular film of the year in France.

Jurgens was now an international film star. He did Bitter Victory (1957) with Richard Burton and director Nicholas Ray, Les Espions (1957) for Henri-Georges Clouzot then appeared in his first Hollywood film, The Enemy Below (1957), in which he portrayed a German U-boat commander. Michael Powell wanted Jurgens to play Heinrich Kreipe in Ill Met By Moonlight (1957) but the Rank Organisation would not pay his fee.

Jurgens starred in a French film, Tamango (1958), opposite Dorothy Dandridge with whom he had an affair. Jurgens went to Hollywood to appear in This Happy Feeling (1958) for Blake Edwards, Me and the Colonel (1958) with Danny Kaye and The Inn of the Sixth Happiness (1958) with Ingrid Bergman, which was very popular. An item in Variety in April 1958 said he was "well on the way to becoming another middleaged matinee idol in the Ezio Pinza tradition saying he'd "appeared in 89 pictures and an equal number of plays. In 1957 he starred in seven films, four made in France in English, French and German versions and three produced on the coast."

In Germany Jurgens was in Der Schinderhannes (1958) then for Rank, and he co-starred opposite Orson Welles in Ferry to Hong Kong (1959), which was a huge box office flop in England and America. In Hollywood he starred in the remake of The Blue Angel (1959) opposite May Britt. He made Magnificent Sinner (1959) with Romy Schneider. In June 1959 Jurgens said he wanted to mix Hollywood films with non-Hollywood films so world producers did not forget him. Variety called him "the most active international star in the world today".

Jurgens starred in I Aim at the Stars (1960). While promoting the latter he announced he had formed his own company Cinestar and would no longer make German films now that producers had set a maximum fee of $25,000.

He did Brainwashed (1960), a Rank film shot in Germany, then Gustav Adolf's Page (1960) and Bankraub in der Rue Latour (1961), which he also directed.

Jurgens appeared in a sequel to his earlier hit, The Triumph of Michael Strogoff (1962) and was in Disorder (1962) with Louis Jourdan. He played the German general Günther Blumentritt in The Longest Day (1962).

Jurgens starred in Don Giovanni della Costa Azzurra (1962) and made Miracle of the White Stallions (1962) for Disney, Of Love and Desire (1963) for Fox, and Nutty, Naughty Chateau (1963) for Vadim. In England Jurgens appeared in Hide and Seek (1964) then made Encounter in Salzburg (1964), Les Parias de la gloire (1964), the British Psyche 59 (1964) and Lord Jim (1965).

== Later career ==
Jurgens began to move down the cast list in Who Wants to Sleep? (1966), Target for Killing (1966), The Gardener of Argenteuil (1966), Dirty Heroes (1967), The Karate Killers (1967), and OSS 117 – Double Agent (1968). He had a lead in The Doctor of St. Pauli (1968) and supported in The Assassination Bureau (1969), Battle of the Commandos (1969), On the Reeperbahn at Half Past Midnight (1969), Battle of Britain (1969), Battle of Neretva (1970).

Later, in the James Bond film The Spy Who Loved Me (1977), he played the villain Karl Stromberg, a sociopathic industrialist seeking to transform the world into an ocean paradise. But before playing Stromberg, Jürgens played the James Bond stuntman in 1973 German comedy called Klimbim.

His last film appearance was as Maître Legraine, beside Alain Delon and Claude Jade in the spy-thriller Teheran 43 (1981). In English-language television, he played Chancellor Otto von Bismarck in several episodes of the BBC series Fall of Eagles (1974) and appeared as General Vladimir in the BBC's Smiley's People (1982).

== Theatre ==
Although he appeared in over 100 films, Jürgens was also a notable stage actor. He was member of several theatres in Vienna (Volkstheater 1938–1941, Burgtheater 1940–1953 and 1965–1968, and others). He played the title role of Hugo von Hofmannsthal's play Jedermann at the Salzburg Festival from 1973 until 1977 – arguably the most high-profile role for a German-speaking male actor. In 1966 he appeared in a short run on Broadway at the Eugene O'Neill Theatre opposite Geraldine Page, directed by George Schaefer.

His last stage appearance was with the Vienna State Opera on 9 March 1981 as Bassa Selim in Mozart's opera Die Entführung aus dem Serail. He also directed a few films with limited success, e.g. Bankraub in der Rue Latour, and wrote screenplays, e.g. Bonus on Death.

He titled his 1976 memoir ... und kein bißchen weise (And Not At All Wise).

Jürgens provided the German voice of the journalist in the 1980 German dub of Jeff Wayne's Musical Version of the War of the Worlds.

== Personal life ==
Jürgens maintained a home in France, but he frequently returned to Vienna to perform on stage. He had suffered a heart attack several years before. During this heart attack, he claimed he had a near-death experience where he went to Hell.

At some point, Jürgens had affairs with actresses Romy Schneider (in 1957) and Dorothy Dandridge. After a two-year affair, his relationship with his young lover Mathilda Mizart ended in 1974 when she died in an accident. In 1975 he began a relationship with the Chilean-Austrian Marlene Knaus and they later became engaged. However, they never married because Knaus met Formula 1 driver Niki Lauda and ended the engagement with Jürgens. Knaus married Lauda in 1976.

Jürgens was married to:

1. Lulu Basler, actress (15 June 1937 – 8 October 1947) (divorced)
2. Judith Holzmeister (16 October 1947 – 1955) (divorced)
3. Eva Bartok (13 August 1955 – 1956) (divorced)
4. Simone Bicheron (14 September 1958 – 1977) (divorced)
5. Margie Schmitz (21 March 1978 – 18 June 1982) (his death)

=== Death ===
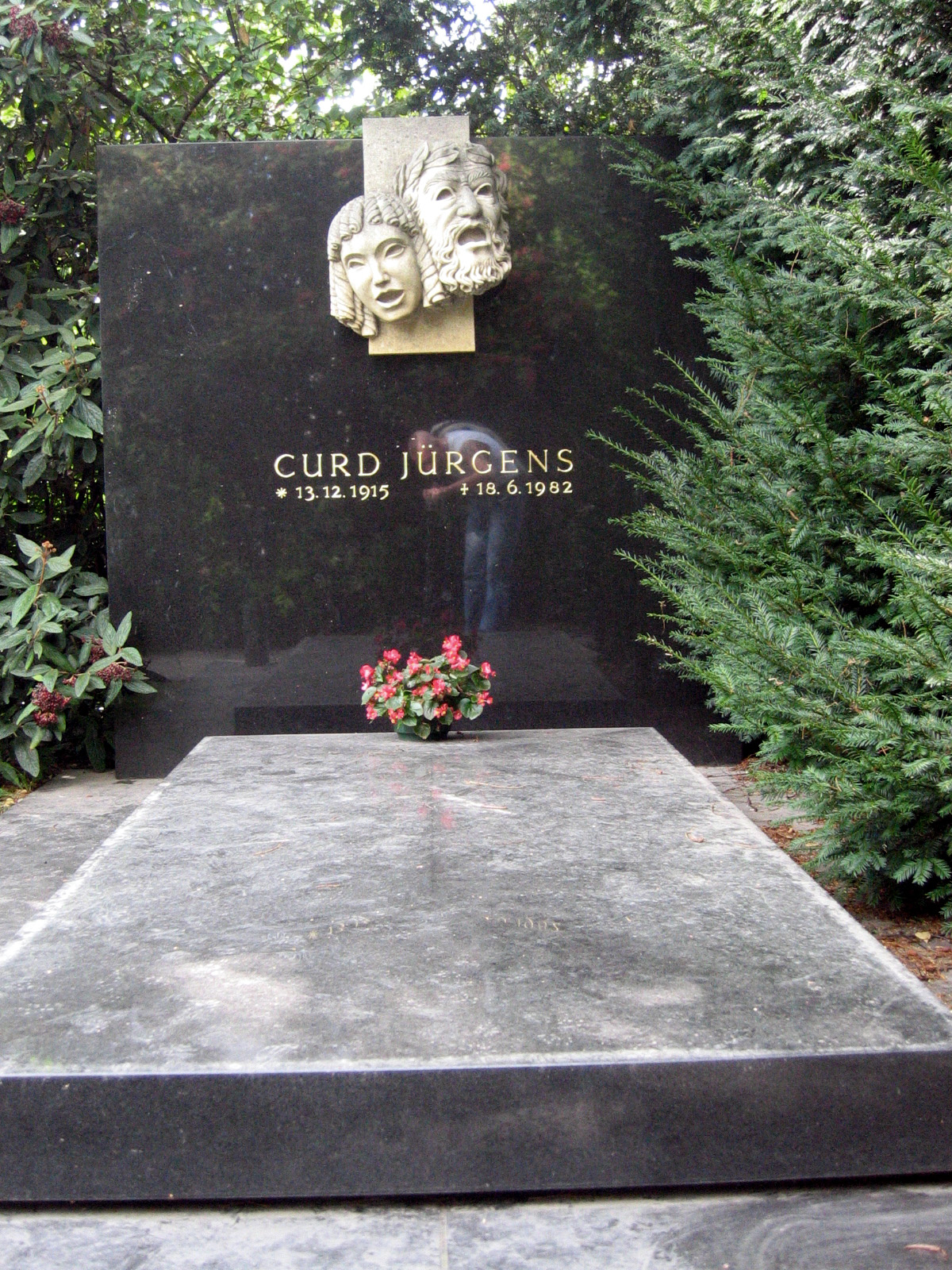
Jürgens' grave in the Vienna Central Cemetery

Jürgens died on 18 June 1982 of multiple organ failure at the Rudolfstiftung hospital in Vienna at the age of 66, before the German version of the thriller film Teheran 43 was completed. His role as dubbing voice had to be replaced by Wilhelm Borchert.

His burial was in the Vienna Central Cemetery in a grave of honor (Group 32C No. 54). It took place on 22 June 1982, in the first and only night ceremony at 9 pm. His widow and one of his older sisters with his children and some 3,000 fans gathered at the graveside. A formation of the Austrian Air Force flew over the cemetery in his honor.

== Partial filmography ==
- The Royal Waltz (1935), as Kaiser Franz Joseph of Austria (Jürgens' first film)
- Family Parade (1936), as Graf Erik Stjernenhö
- The Unknown (1936), as Hans Wellenkamp
- Love Can Lie (1937), as Student Holger Engström
- To New Shores (1937), as Bobby Wells' Friend
- Tango Notturno (1937), as Friend of Jac, Musician (uncredited)
- The Girl of Last Night (1938), as Die drei Attachés (uncredited)
- Salonwagen E 417 (1939), as Prinz Heinrich Karl
- Weltrekord im Seitensprung (1940), as Peter Enderlein, Kapellmeister
- Herz ohne Heimat (1940), as Bob (uncredited)
- Operetta (1940), as Karl Millöcker
- Voice of the Heart (1942), as Volontär Drews
- Whom the Gods Love (1942), as Emperor Joseph II
- Women Are No Angels (1943), as Bandini
- Ein glücklicher Mensch (1943), as Petersen
- Ein Blick zurück (1944), as Dr. Erich Thienwiebel
- Eine kleine Sommermelodie (1944), as Wolfgang Schwab
- The Singing House (1948), as Bandleader Hans Storch
- Hin und her (1948), as Prinz Bernardo
- The Angel with the Trumpet (1948), as Graf Leopold Thraun
- On Resonant Shores (1948), as Stefan Keller
- The Heavenly Waltz (1948), as Clemens M. Weidenauer
- Verlorenes Rennen (1948), as George Miller
- Das Kuckucksei (1949), as Dr. Kurt Walla
- Lambert Feels Threatened (1949), as Kommissar Roland
- Hexen (1949), as Heinz Wagner
- Viennese Girls (1949), as Graf Lechenberg
- Bonus on Death (1950), as Gunarson, Opera Tenor
- Der Schuß durchs Fenster (1950)
- Kissing Is No Sin (1950), as Kammersänger Felix Alberti
- The Disturbed Wedding Night (1950), as Lawrence Vinning
- A Rare Lover (1950), as Sascha Borotraz
- Ein Lächeln im Sturm (1951), as Jean Langrand
- The Secret of a Marriage (1951), as Conductor Felix Adrian
- Der schweigende Mund (1951), as Architect Reinhold
- Gangsterpremiere (1951), as Kommissar
- House of Life (1952), as Axel Jolander
- Knall and Fall, as Imposters (1952), as John Vandergold
- 1. April 2000 (1952), as Capitano Herakles
- Rose of the Mountain (1952), as Composer Jack Long
- Praterherzen (1953), as Toni Brandstetter
- They Call It Love (1953), as Peter Malmö
- Music by Night (1953), as Hans Kersten
- The Last Waltz (1953), as Rittmeister Graf Sarassow
- Everything for Father (1953), as Clemens Haberland
- Meines Vaters Pferde I. Teil Lena und Nicoline (1954), as Pat
- A Woman of Today (1954), as Heinz Bender
- Circus of Love (1954), as Toni
- Prisoners of Love (1954), as Willi Kluge
- Orient Express (1954), as Bate
- The Confession of Ina Kahr (1954), as Paul Kahr
- Du bist die Richtige (1955), as Stefan Selby
- Des Teufels General (1955), as Gen. Harry Harras
- Love Without Illusions (1955), as Walter
- Die Ratten (1955), as Bruno Mechelke
- The Heroes Are Tired (1955), as Wolf Gerke
- Du mein stilles Tal (1955), as Gerd
- Devil in Silk (1956), as Thomas Ritter
- The Golden Bridge (1956), as Balder
- Without You All Is Darkness (1956), as Dr. Robert Kessler
- And God Created Woman (1956), as Eric Carradine
- The House of Intrigue (Italian: Londra chiama polo Nord) (1956), as Colonel Bernes
- Michael Strogoff (1956), as Michel Strogoff
- Bitter Victory (1957), as Major Brand
- An Eye for an Eye (1957), as Dr. Walter
- Les Espions (1957), as Alex
- The Enemy Below (1957), as Von Stolberg
- Tamango (1958), as Captain John Reinker
- This Happy Feeling (1958), as Preston Mitchell
- Me and the Colonel (1958), as Colonel Prokoszny
- The Inn of the Sixth Happiness (1958), as Captain Lin Nan
- Der Schinderhannes (1958), as Johann 'Schinderhannes' Bückler
- Le vent se lève (1959), as Eric Muller
- Ferry to Hong Kong (1959), as Mark Bertram Conrad
- The Blue Angel (1959), as Professor Immanuel Rath
- Magnificent Sinner (1959), as Tsar Alexander II
- I Aim at the Stars (1960), as Wernher von Braun
- Brainwashed (1960), as Werner von Basil
- Gustav Adolf's Page (1960), as King Gustav Adolf
- Bankraub in der Rue Latour (1961), as Cliff MacHardy
- Girl in a Suitcase (1961), as Rich Guy in Boat (uncredited)
- The Triumph of Michael Strogoff (1961), as Michel Strogoff
- Disorder (1962), as Carlo's Father
- The Longest Day (1962), as General Günther Blumentritt
- I Don Giovanni della Costa Azzurra (1962), as Mr. Edmond
- The Threepenny Opera (1963), as Captain Macheath
- Miracle of the White Stallions (1963), as Gen. Tellheim
- Of Love and Desire (1963), as Paul Beckmann
- Nutty, Naughty Chateau (1963), as Hugo Falsen
- Hide and Seek (1964), as Hubert Marek
- Encounter in Salzburg (1964), as Hans Wilke, General Director
- Les Parias de la gloire (1964), as Ludwig Goetz
- Psyche 59 (1964), as Eric Crawford
- DM-Killer (1965), as Kurt Lehnert
- Lord Jim (1965), as Cornelius
- Who Wants to Sleep? (1965), as Stefan von Cramer
- Two Girls from the Red Star (1966), as Dave O'Connor
- Congress of Love (1966), as Czar Alexander I
- Target for Killing (1966), as Gérard van Looch / Giant
- The Gardener of Argenteuil (1966), as The Baron
- Dirty Heroes (1967), as General Edwin von Keist
- The Karate Killers (1967), as Carl von Kessen
- The Liar and the Nun (1967), as The Cardinal
- OSS 117 – Double Agent (1968), as Il Maggiore
- The Doctor of St. Pauli (1968), as Dr. Jan Diffring
- Babeck (1968, TV miniseries), as Babeck
- The Assassination Bureau (1969), as Gen. von Pinck
- Battle of the Commandos (1969), as Gen. von Reilow
- On the Reeperbahn at Half Past Midnight (1969), as Hannes Teversen
- Battle of Britain (1969), as Baron von Richter
- Battle of Neretva (1969), as Lohring
- Slap in the Face (1970), as Thomas Nathan Terbanks
- Hotel by the Hour (1970), as Kommissar Canisius
- The Invincible Six (1970), as Baron
- Hello-Goodbye (1970), as Baron De Choisis
- The Priest of St. Pauli (1970), as Konrad Johannsen
- Cannabis (1970), as Henri Emery
- The Mephisto Waltz (1971), as Duncan Mowbray Ely
- Captain Typhoon (1971), as Captain Markus Jolly
- Nicholas and Alexandra (1971), as the German Consul to Switzerland
- Fieras sin jaula (1971), as Ronald Marvelling
- Kill! Kill! Kill! Kill! (1971), as Grueningen
- À la guerre comme à la guerre (1972), as Russian general
- Der Kommissar (1972–1973, TV series, 2 episodes), as Harald Bergmann / Dr. Hochstätter
- The Vault of Horror (1973), as Sebastian (segment 3 "This Trick'll Kill You")
- Profession: Adventurers (1973), as Alvarez
- Soft Beds, Hard Battles (1974), as General Von Grotjahn
- Fall of Eagles (1974, TV series), as Otto von Bismarck
- Radiografia di una Svastika (1974)
- Fräulein Else (1974, TV film)
- Cagliostro (1975), as Cardinal Braschi
- Derrick – Season 2, episode 4: "Madeira" (1975), as Paul Bubach
- A Second Spring (1975), as Fox
- Povero Cristo (1975), as Man Engaging Giorgio
- The Mimosa Wants to Blossom Too (1976), as Josef Popov
- As of Tomorrow (1976), as Senator Shelton
- The Twist (1976), as Jeweler
- The Spy Who Loved Me (1977), as Karl Stromberg
- Schöner Gigolo, armer Gigolo (1978), as Prince
- A Far Country (1979, TV film), as Sigmund Freud
- Breakthrough (1979), as Gen. Hofmann
- Missile X: The Neutron Bomb Incident (1979) (also known as Teheran Incident and Cruise Missile), as Baron Marchant
- Goldengirl (1979), as Dr. Serafin
- La lunga strada senza polvere (1979), Cameo (uncredited)
- La Gueule de l'autre (1979), as Wilfrid
- Why the UFOs Steal Our Lettuce (1980), as UFO Commander
- The Sleep of Death (1980), as Count St. Alyre
- Teheran 43 (1981), as Maître Legraine
- Collin (1981, TV film), as Hans Collin
- Smiley's People (1982, TV miniseries), as General Vladimir (final role)
