= A Glass of Water =

A Glass of Water may refer to:

- A Glass of Water (play), an 1842 play by the French writer Eugene Scribe
- A Glass of Water (1923 film), a 1923 German film
- A Glass of Water (1960 film), a 1960 German film
- A Glass of Water (1979 film), a 1979 Russian film

== See also ==
- "Glass of Water"
