= Cultural depictions of Anne, Queen of Great Britain =

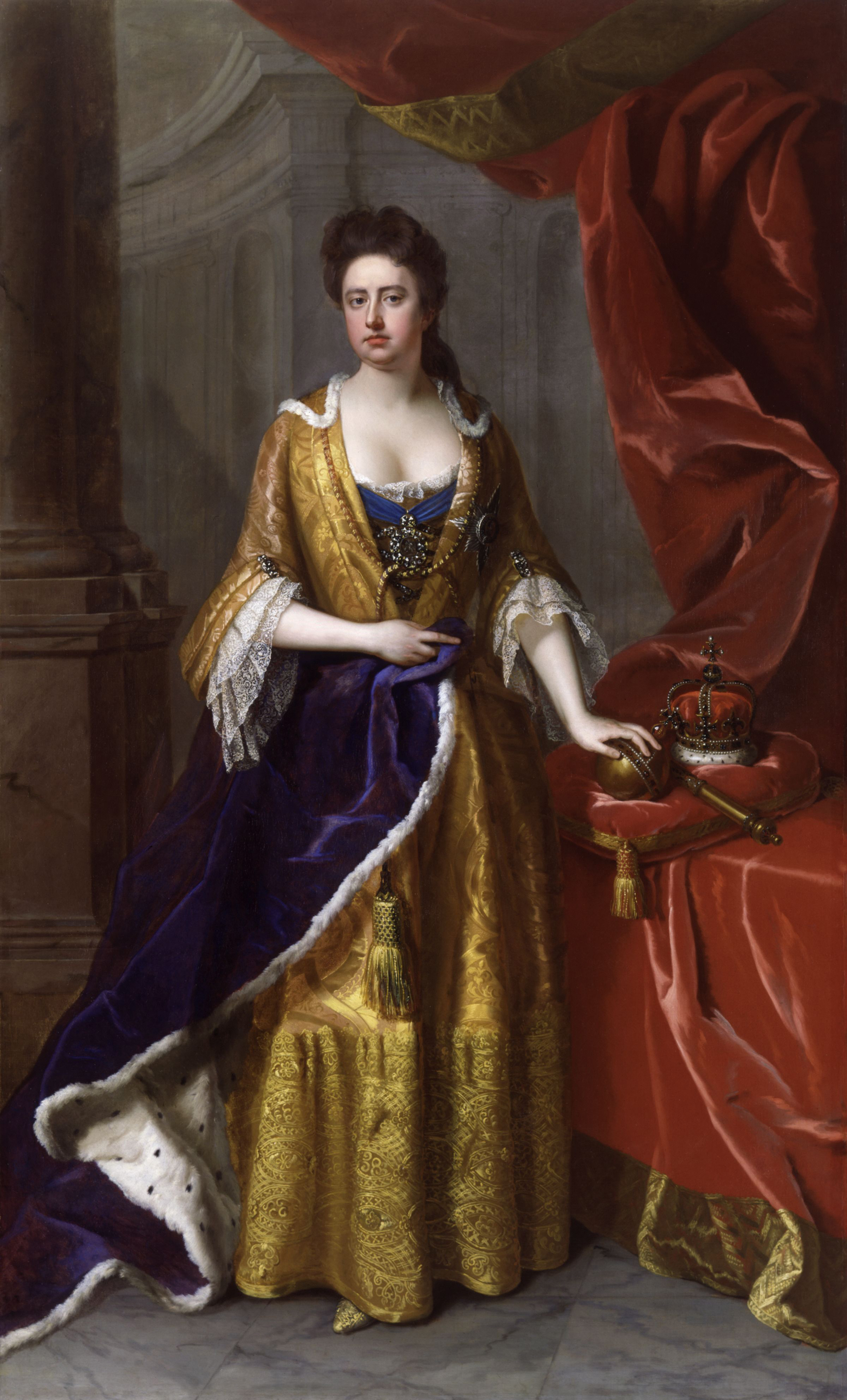

Anne, Queen of Great Britain has been depicted in novels, film and television.

== Literature ==
Anne is a character in the 1869 novel The Man Who Laughs by Victor Hugo, and the 1912 novel The White Gauntlet, by Percy James Brebner. The 2016 novel What if the Queen Should Die, by John-Paul Flintoff, is about the last days of her life. Anne is also the protagonist of the short story "The Emancipation of Mrs. Morley" (1935) by Clemence Dane.

== Theatre ==
Anne is a character in the play Le Verre d'eau (1840), by Eugène Scribe. The titular play Queen Anne, written by the playwright Helen Edmundson, dramatizes the relationship between Anne and Sarah, Duchess of Marlborough, as well as the court politics and succession issues of Anne's court. It was first produced by the Royal Shakespeare Company at the Swan Theatre, Stratford-upon-Avon between November, 2015 and January, 2016, before opening at the Theatre Royal, Haymarket in London, where it ran between June and September 2017.

== Television ==
Anne is played by Margaret Tyzack in the 1969 BBC television serial The First Churchills. Elizabeth Spriggs portrayed her in the 2004 BBC drama documentary Wren: The Man Who Built Britain. Jodhi May depicted Queen Anne in the 2024 historical fantasy series Renegade Nell.

== Film ==
Anne was portrayed on screen by Anna Kallina in the 1921 Austrian silent adaptation Das grinsende Gesicht of Hugo's novel, and by Josephine Crowell in the 1928 silent adaptation. She is also a character in the play Le Verre d'eau by Eugène Scribe; Gunnel Lindblom portrayed her in the 1960 Swedish TV adaptation of Scribe's play Ett Glas vatten; Liselotte Pulver in the 1960 West German film adaptation Das Glas Wasser, Judit Halász in the 1977 Hungarian TV adaptation Sakk-matt, and Natalya Belokhvostikova in the 1979 Soviet film adaptation Stakan vody (Стакан воды). In the 1984 comedy Yellowbeard she was played by Peter Bull (in his last film role) as a fat, senile woman, dominated by Sarah Churchill.

Olivia Colman is Anne in The Favourite, which centres on the competition for her affection from Sarah Churchill and Abigail Masham. For it, Colman won an Academy Award for Best Actress.
