= Sky Without Stars =

1955 film directed by Helmut Käutner

- German film poster
- German: Himmel ohne Sterne
- Directed by: Helmut Käutner
- Written by: Helmut Käutner
- Produced by: Harald Braun; Georg Richter
- Starring: Erik Schumann; Eva Kotthaus; Horst Buchholz
- Cinematography: Kurt Hasse
- Edited by: Anneliese Schönnenbeck
- Music by: Bernhard Eichhorn
- Production company: Neue Deutsche Filmgesellschaft
- Distributed by: Europa-Filmverleih; Sascha Film (Austria)
- Release date: 14 October 1955
- Running time: 108 minutes
- Country: West Germany
- Language: German

Sky Without Stars (German: Himmel ohne Sterne) is a 1955 West German drama film directed by Helmut Käutner and starring Erik Schumann, Eva Kotthaus and Horst Buchholz. It was shot at the Bavaria Studios in Munich. The film's sets were designed by the art director Hans Berthel and Robert Stratil.

== Cast ==
- Erik Schumann as Carl Altmann
- Eva Kotthaus as Anna Kaminski
- Horst Buchholz as Mischa Bjelkin
- Georg Thomalla as Willi Becker
- Gustav Knuth as Otto Friese
- Camilla Spira as Elsbeth Friese
- Erich Ponto as Vater Otto Kaminski
- Lucie Höflich as Mutter Mathilde Kaminski
- Rainer Stang as Jochen
- Siegfried Lowitz as Hüske
- Otto Wernicke as Inspektor Hoffmann
- Wolfgang Neuss as Vopo Edgar Bröse
- Paul Bildt as Direktor Klütsch
- Beppo Schwaiger as Inspektor Henning
- Joseph Offenbach as Polizei-Offizier
- Pinkas Braun as Kommissar Engelbrecht
- Rolf Gottwald as Vopo
- Edith Hancke as Frau am Kontrollpunkt
- Lina Carstens
- Helmut Käutner as Speaker
