= Bernhard Eichhorn =

German composer

- Born: 17 April 1904; Schortewitz, German Empire
- Died: 6 February 1980 (aged 75); Miesbach, Bavaria, West Germany
- Occupation: Composer
- Years active: 1940 – 1976

Bernhard Eichhorn (17 April 1904 – 6 February 1980) was a German composer, who produced a number of film scores.

== Biography ==
Eichhorn was born in Schortewitz. In 1927, he joined the Universität und Akademie für Tonkunst in Munich, under Arthur Kutscher. In 1927/28, he was Korrepetitor at the Bavarian State Opera and afterwards Kapellmeister at the Bayerische Landesbühne. From 1934 to 1944, he was music director at the Staatstheater Dresden. From 1945 to 1947, Eichhorn was Kapellmeister at the Städtische Bühnen München. Since then, he lived as a freelance composer for film, radio, television and the stage.

He died in Miesbach.

== Selected filmography ==
- Anuschka (1942)
- Doctor Crippen (1942)
- Journey into the Past (1943)
- Under the Bridges (1946)
- In Those Days (1947)
- The Time with You (1948)
- The Orplid Mystery (1950)
- Royal Children (1950)
- The Violin Maker of Mittenwald (1950)
- The Cloister of Martins (1951)
- White Shadows (1951)
- House of Life (1952)
- The Monastery's Hunter (1953)
- Hubertus Castle (1954)
- Rose-Girl Resli (1954)
- The Silent Angel (1954)
- The Dark Star (1955)
- Sky Without Stars (1955)
- Lost Child 312 (1955)
- The Vulture Wally (1956)
- The Girl from Flanders (1956)
- The Captain from Köpenick (1956)
- Love From Paris (1957)
- Iron Gustav (1958)
- Jons und Erdme (1959)
- The Goose of Sedan (1959)
- A Glass of Water (1960)
- The Good Soldier Schweik (1960)
- The Dream of Lieschen Mueller (1961)
- Blind Justice (1961)

== Bibliography ==
- Reimer, Robert (2000). Cultural history through a National Socialist lens : essays on the cinema of the Third Reich. Rochester, NY: Camden House. ISBN 978-1-57113-164-5. OCLC 43186070.
