= Gábor Vaszary =

Hungarian novelist

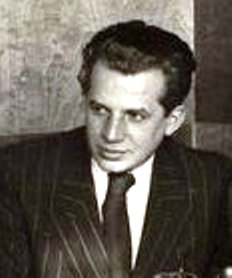
Vaszary around 1930

Gábor Vaszary or Gábor von Vaszary, (7 June 1897 in Budapest – 22 May 1985), was a Hungarian novelist and screenwriter. He emigrated to Switzerland in 1947. He wrote a number of novels which depict life in Paris in the 1920s and 1930s.

Several of his books have been adapted for cinema, for example Monpti which was the basis for the 1957 film Love from Paris directed by Helmut Käutner.

== Selected filmography ==
- Tokay Rhapsody (1937)
- The Devil Doesn't Sleep (1941)
- Finally! (1941)
- I'll Make You Happy (1944)
- Life Begins at Seventeen (1953)
- She (1954)
- Love from Paris (1957)
- Marry Me, Cherie (1964)
