= Miss Evelyne =

1929 film

- Directed by: Norman Dix
- Written by: Norman Dix
- Cinematography: Hans Burger
- Production company: Dix-Film
- Release date: 1929
- Running time: 71 minutes
- Country: Germany
- Languages: Silent; German intertitles

Miss Evelyne (German: Miss Evelyne, die Badefee) is a 1929 German silent film directed by Norman Dix and starring Pilar Munza, Marietta Manetti and Karl Peukert.

== Cast ==
- Pilar Munza as Miss Evelyne Dollar aus New York / Ingeborg erk, englische Korrespondentin der Fa. Bluff & Co
- Marietta Manetti as Ruth Corrin Gesellschafterin bei Miss Evelyne
- Karl Peukert as Dr. med. Freytag
- Ernst Netrük as Assessor Winnhuber
- Bobby Todd as Ritter Karlheinz von u. zu Daxl
- August Junker as René Bombast
- Adolf Satzenhofer as Fred Spencer
- Adolf Böckl as Aloisius Meier aus München
