= Horst Buchholz =

German actor (1933–2003)

- Born: 4 December 1933; Berlin, German Reich
- Died: 3 March 2003 (aged 69); Berlin, Germany
- Occupation: Actor
- Years active: 1951–2003
- Spouse: Myriam Bru (m. 1958–2003)
- Children: 2, including Christopher Buchholz

Horst Werner Buchholz (4 December 1933 – 3 March 2003) was a German actor who appeared in more than 60 feature films from 1951 to 2002. During his youth, he was sometimes called "the German James Dean". He is perhaps best known in English-speaking countries for his roles as Chico in The Magnificent Seven (1960), as a communist in Billy Wilder's One, Two, Three (1961), and as Dr. Lessing in Life Is Beautiful (1997).

== Early life ==
Horst Buchholz was born in Berlin, the son of Maria Hasenkamp. He never knew his biological father, but took the surname of his stepfather Hugo Buchholz, a shoemaker, whom his mother married in 1938. His half-sister Heidi, born in 1941, gave him the nickname Hotte, which he kept for the rest of his life.

During World War II, he was evacuated to Silesia, and at the end of the war, he found himself in a foster home in Czechoslovakia. He returned to Berlin as soon as he could.

Buchholz barely finished his schooling before seeking theater work, first appearing on stage in 1949. He soon left his childhood home in East Berlin to work in West Berlin. He established himself in the theater, notably the Schiller Theater, and on radio.

== Early film career ==
Buchholz expanded into film work by doing foreign-language voice dubbing, for example Lampwick in Pinocchio and Ben Cooper in Johnny Guitar.

In 1951 he started getting small, uncredited on-screen parts in films like Warum? (1951) and Adventure in Berlin (1952).

He had a larger role in Marianne of My Youth (1954), directed by Julien Duvivier and was in a TV movie Die Schule der Väter. He was in Sky Without Stars (1955) from Helmut Käutner and Regine (1956).

== Stardom ==
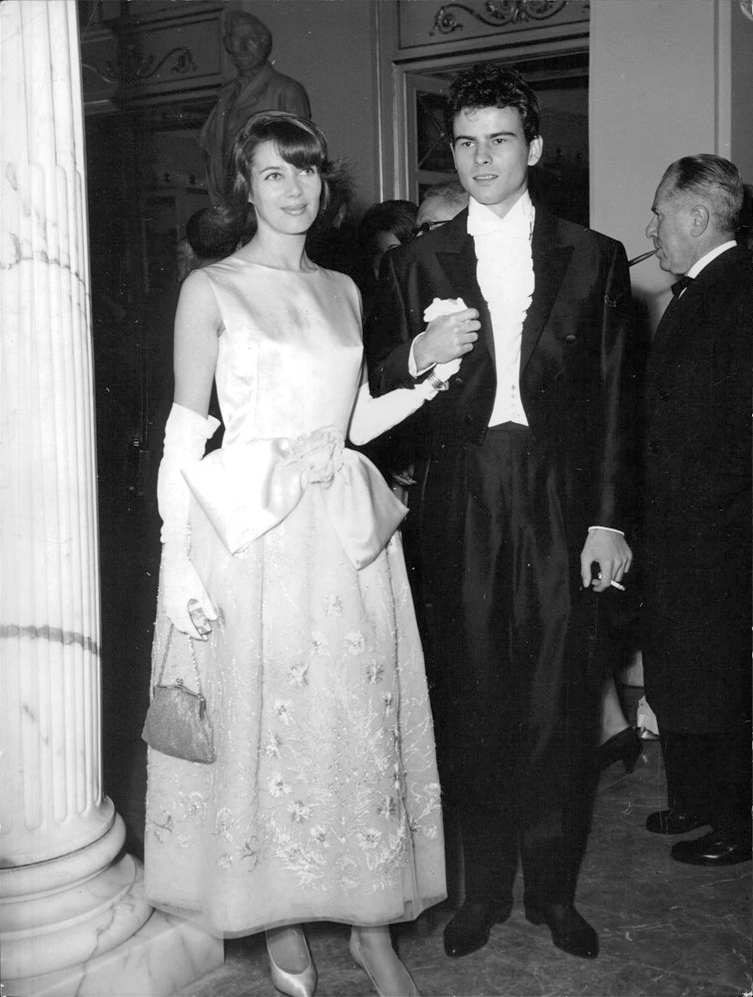
Horst Buchholz with Myriam Bru, late 1950s

His youthful good looks next brought him a part in Die Halbstarken (1956), which made him a teenage favorite in Germany; an English-dubbed version was released in the US as Teenage Wolfpack, with Buchholz billed as Henry Bookholt and promoted as a new James Dean.

He was in King in Shadow (1957) then The Girl and the Legend (1957) with Romy Schneider. Full-fledged stardom resulted from Confessions of Felix Krull (1957), in which he played the lead of a narcissistic high-class conman; it was directed by Kurt Hoffmann and based on the novel by Thomas Mann. He made another with Schneider, Monpti (1957), aka Love from Paris.

That year he starred in Two Worlds (1958), Wet Asphalt (1958), and Auferstehung (1958) aka Resurrection.

== English-language films ==
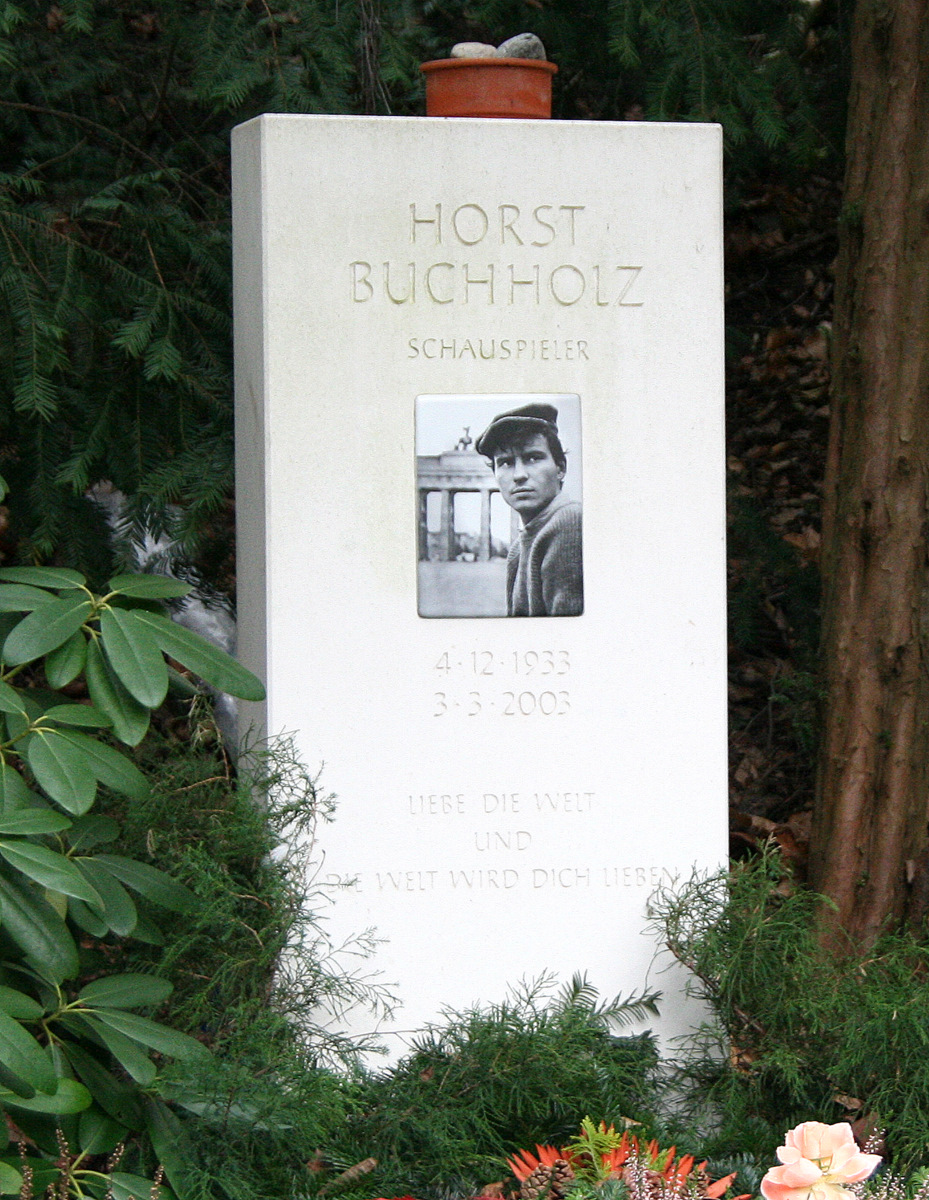
Buchholz's gravestone in Berlin. The word below his name means "actor". Below his birth and death dates it says in German, "Love the world and the world will love you".

Buchholz began appearing in English-language films in 1959, when he co-starred in the British production Tiger Bay introducing Hayley Mills. It was a notable success. In her autobiography, Mills revealed she had a schoolgirl crush on Buchholz during the filming of Tiger Bay and was saddened when the cast threw him an engagement party.

He returned to Germany for Ship of the Dead (1959), then accepted an offer from Hollywood to play a young aspiring gunslinger in The Magnificent Seven (1960), a remake of Akira Kurosawa's Seven Samurai (1954) in which he would play the role originally portrayed by Toshiro Mifune in the Japanese version. Arriving in the U.S. with time to spare before filming began, Buchholz lingered in New York and appeared on Broadway in a short-lived adaptation of Cheri (1959) and then continued westward.

After The Magnificent Seven, which went on to become a classic, Buchholz played in the romantic drama Fanny (1961) with Leslie Caron and Maurice Chevalier, and the Berlin-set comedy One, Two, Three (1961), directed by Billy Wilder and starring James Cagney. Though filmed in Mexico, France and Germany respectively, these were Hollywood productions and Buchholz had begun a period of residence in Los Angeles. He proved to be popular with American audiences, but several missed opportunities thwarted the upward trajectory of his career and it began to stall. Filming schedule conflicts prevented him from accepting the offered roles of Tony in West Side Story (1961) and Sherif Ali in Lawrence of Arabia (1962), a part that eventually went to Omar Sharif.

Instead he played the lead in Nine Hours to Rama (1963) for Twentieth Century Fox and The Empty Canvas (1963), shot in Italy with Bette Davis. He returned to Broadway to appear in Andorra (1963), which had a short run.

== International star ==
On the advice of his agent, like many other actors who were asked, he turned down the starring role in A Fistful of Dollars (1964). He was in Marco the Magnificent (1965) with Anthony Quinn; That Man in Istanbul (1965), a Eurospy film; Johnny Banco (1967), a comedy with Yves Allégret; and Young Rebel (1967), a biopic of Miguel de Cervantes with Gina Lollobrigida. He guest starred on The Danny Thomas Hour (1968).

Buchholz starred in Astragal (1969), How, When and with Whom (1969), The Dove Must Not Fly (1970), and The Saviour (1971). He returned to Hollywood lead roles briefly with The Great Waltz (1971) playing Johann Strauss.

Buchholz starred in ...But Johnny! (1973), and The Catamount Killing (1974). He appeared on German television in shows like Die Klempner kommen (1976).

== Supporting actor ==
Buchholz moved to supporting roles in films like The Savage Bees (1976), Raid on Entebbe (1976), Dead of Night (1977), and The Amazing Captain Nemo (1978). He guest starred on episodes of Logan's Run, Fantasy Island, Charlie's Angels, and How the West Was Won and had the lead in Women in Hospital (1977) and a role in The French Atlantic Affair (1979).

Buchholz was in From Hell to Victory (1979), and Avalanche Express (1979). He had the co lead in Berlin Tunnel 21 (1981) and was top billed in Aphrodite (1981). He guest starred several times on Derrick and had a supporting part in Sahara (1983).

== Later career ==
Buchholz focused on Germany: Funkeln im Auge (1984), and Fear of Falling (1984). He went to Hollywood for parts in Code Name: Emerald (1985) and Crossings (1986).

Buchholz's credits include Affari di famiglia (1986), Die Fräulein von damals (1986), and Der Schatz im Niemandsland (1987). He had the lead in And the Violins Stopped Playing (1989) and supporting role in Escape from Paradise (1990).

Buchholz turned up in Aces: Iron Eagle III (1992), Touch and Die (1992), Faraway, So Close! (1993), The Cave of the Golden Rose 4 (1995), Tödliches Erbe (1995), Der Clan der Anna Voss (1995), Maître Da Costa, and The Firebird (1997). He portrayed Dr. Lessing in Roberto Benigni's Life Is Beautiful (1997).

He was in Geisterstunde – Fahrstuhl ins Jenseits (1997), Der kleine Unterschied (1997), Dunckel (1998) and Der kleine Unterschied (1998), and voiced Fa Zhou in the German dub of Mulan. He returned to America for Voyage of Terror (1998).

Buchholz's last performances include Kinderraub in Rio – Eine Mutter schlägt zurück (1998), Heller als der Mond (2000), The Enemy (2001), Der Club der grünen Witwen (2001), Traumfrau mit Verspätung (2001), Detective Lovelorn and the Revenge of the Pharaoh (2001), Abschnitt 40 (2001), Atlantic Affairs (2002) and In der Mitte eines Lebens (2003).

== Personal life and death ==
In 1958, Buchholz married French actress Myriam Bru and they had two children: son Christopher, an actor, and daughter Beatrice.

Buchholz explained in a 2000 interview that he and Myriam had a stable and enduring arrangement, with her life centered in Paris and his in Berlin, the city that he loved. In the same interview Buchholz discussed his bisexuality. Their son Christopher Buchholz, also an actor, produced a feature-length documentary Horst Buchholz ... Mein Papa (2005) which considered Buchholz's sexuality, as part of a wider exploration of his life. His sexuality had not been publicly known in the 1960s when he had played lead roles in English-language movies.

Buchholz died unexpectedly at the age of 69 on 3 March 2003 at Charité from pneumonia that developed after an operation for a hip fracture. Berlin was the city to which his loyalty was consistent, and he was buried there in the Friedhof Heerstraße.

== Selected filmography ==
- All Clues Lead to Berlin (1952), as Young Man at the Radio Tower (uncredited)
- Marianne of My Youth (1955), as Vincent Loringer (German version only)
- Sky Without Stars (1955), as Mischa Bjelkin
- Regine (1956), as Karl Winter
- Teenage Wolfpack (1956), as Freddy Borchert
- King in Shadow (1957), as King Christian
- The Girl and the Legend (1957), as Tom
- Confessions of Felix Krull (1957), as Felix Krull
- Love From Paris (1957), as Monpti (as a young man)
- A Piece of Heaven (1957), as Cabriolet-Driver (uncredited)
- Endstation Liebe (1958), as Mecky Berger
- Nasser Asphalt (1958), as Greg Bachmann
- Resurrection (1958), as Nechljudoff
- Tiger Bay (1959), as Korchinsky
- The Death Ship (1959), as Philip Gale
- The Magnificent Seven (1960), as Chico
- Fanny (1961), as Marius
- One, Two, Three (1961), as Otto Ludwig Piffl
- Nine Hours to Rama (1963), as Nathuram Godse
- The Empty Canvas (1963), as Dino
- Marco the Magnificent (1965), as Marco Polo
- That Man in Istanbul (1965), as Tony Mecenas
- Johnny Banco (1967), as Johnny Banco
- Cervantes (1967, in the title role), as Miguel De Cervantes
- L'Astragale (1968), as Julien
- Come, quando, perché (1969), as Alberto
- The Dove Must Not Fly (1970), as Pablo Vallajo
- Le Sauveur (1971), as Claude
- The Great Waltz (1972), as Johann Strauss Jr.
- ...aber Jonny! (1973), as Jonny
- Welcome Stranger (1973)
- The Catamount Killing (1974), as Mark Kalvin
- Derrick
  - Season 3, Episode 11: "Das Superding" (1976), as Gerke
  - Season 5, Episode 8: "Solo für Margarete" (1978), as Alexis
  - Season 7, Episode 8: "Auf einem Gutshof" (1980), as Richard Schulte
  - Season 10, Episode 2: "Die Tote in der Isar" (1983), as Arthur Dissmann
- Raid on Entebbe (1976, TV Movie), as Wilfried Böse
- Dead of Night (1977, TV Movie), as Michael
- Women in Hospital (1977), as Dr. Schumann
- Logan's Run Season 1, Episode 3: "Capture" (1977), as James Borden
- The Return of Captain Nemo (1978), as King Tibor
- Charlie's Angels Season 3, Episode 3: Angel Come Home (1978), as Paul Ferrino
- The French Atlantic Affair (1979), as Dr. Chabot
- From Hell to Victory (1979), as Jürgen Dietrich
- Avalanche Express (1979), as Julian Scholten
- Berlin Tunnel 21 (1981), as Emerich Weber
- Aphrodite (1982), as Harry Laird
- Sahara (1983), as Von Glessing
- Fear of Falling (1984), as Robert Feldmann
- Code Name: Emerald (1985), as Walter Hoffman
- And the Violins Stopped Playing (1988), as Dymitr Mirga
- Réquiem por Granada (1990), as Muley Hacén
- Flight from Paradise (1990), as Thor
- Aces: Iron Eagle III (1992), as Ernst Leichmann
- Faraway, So Close! (1993), as Tony Baker
- Fantaghirò 4 (1994), as Darken
- Ptak ohnivak (1997), as King Jorgen
- Life Is Beautiful (1997), as Dottor Lessing
- Mulan (1998) (German Dub)
- Heller als der Mond (2000), as First Guest
- The Enemy (2001), as Dr. George Ashton
- Detective Lovelorn and the Revenge of the Pharaoh (2002), as Professor Svedenborg

== Dubbing roles ==
- Lampwick – Pinocchio (1951 dub)
