= Regine (1956 film) =

1956 film

- Directed by: Harald Braun
- Written by: Gottfried Keller (novel); Jacob Geis; Juliane Kay; Erika Mann
- Produced by: Harald Braun; Georg Richter; Hermann Höhn
- Starring: Johanna Matz; Erik Schumann; Horst Buchholz
- Cinematography: Helmut Ashley
- Edited by: Claus von Boro; Hilwa von Boro
- Music by: Mark Lothar
- Production company: Neue Deutsche Filmgesellschaft
- Distributed by: Europa-Filmverleih
- Release date: 23 February 1956
- Running time: 105 minutes
- Country: West Germany
- Language: German

Regine is a 1956 West German drama film directed by Harald Braun and starring Johanna Matz, Erik Schumann and Horst Buchholz. It was shot at the Bavaria Studios in Munich. The film's sets were designed by the art directors Kurt Herlth and Robert Herlth.

== Cast ==
- Johanna Matz as Regine Winter
- Erik Schumann as Martin Lund
- Horst Buchholz as Karl Winter
- Viktor Staal as Friedrich Wentland
- Käthe Dorsch as Therese Lund
- Rudolf Forster as Geheimrat Hansen
- Gustav Knuth as Der alte Winter
- Ursula Lingen as Rita Carsten
- Ernst Waldow as Direktor Casten
- Siegfried Lowitz as Direktor Gisevius
- Herbert Hübner as Der General
- Peter Arens as Der Leutnant
- Ursula von Reibnitz as Frau von Herms
- Gerd Seid as Franz
- Peter Baalcke as Willi
- Manfred Schaeffer as Der alte Krafft

== See also ==
- Regine (1935)

== Bibliography ==
- Bock, Hans-Michael & Bergfelder, Tim. The Concise CineGraph. Encyclopedia of German Cinema. Berghahn Books, 2009.
