= Love from Paris =

- Theatrical release poster
- German: Monpti
- Directed by: Helmut Käutner
- Screenplay by: Helmut Käutner; Gábor von Vaszary; Willibald Eser
- Based on: Monpti by Gábor von Vaszary
- Produced by: Harald Braun
- Starring: Romy Schneider; Horst Buchholz
- Cinematography: Heinz Pehlke
- Edited by: Anneliese Schönnenbeck
- Music by: Bernhard Eichhorn
- Production company: Neue Deutsche Filmgesellschaft
- Distributed by: Herzog Film
- Release date: 12 September 1957 (West Germany)
- Running time: 96 minutes
- Country: West Germany
- Language: German

Love from Paris (German: Monpti) is a 1957 West German romantic comedy-drama film directed by Helmut Käutner and starring Romy Schneider and Horst Buchholz. It was based on the novel of the same title by Gábor von Vaszary. Vaszary also worked on the screenplay. The cinematographer was Heinz Pehlke, who used different techniques to convey the mood of the film, including using a concealed camera to capture the sights and sounds of Paris. The film premiered on 12 September 1957 in the Lichtburg cinema in Essen. The original copy of the film is archived at the Akademie der Künste in Berlin.

It was shot at the Bavaria Studios in Munich and on location in Paris. The film's sets were designed by the art directors Albrecht Becker and Herbert Kirchhoff.

== Plot ==
A young Hungarian student and a 17-year-old French girl, Anne-Claire, meet in a park in Paris. She calls him "Monpti" (mon p'tit, "my little one"). They fall in love and enjoy a happy time. Anne-Claire claims to come from a wealthy family, but Monpti finds out that she actually comes from poor circumstances. Angered at having been deceived by Anne-Claire, he tells her off on the street and leaves her standing there. As she runs after his taxi, she is hit by another car. Lying in the hospital, Monpti promises he will marry her, but Anne-Claire dies a little while later from her injuries.

At the same time, the story of a second couple is told, whose relationship stands in stark contrast to the main story.

== Reception ==
The Lexicon des Internationalen Films wrote, "In Paris, a hungry 23-year-old artist from Budapest plays an erotic cat-and-mouse game with an orphaned 17-year-old seamstress, until the girl's death from an accident puts an end to it. A melancholic romantic comedy is told by an old Bistro customer who functions as a sort of keyhole peeper in a cabaret-like farce. A melodramatic, compact, at times very suggestive battle of the sexes—male lust and feminine stalling tactics, focusing on a fascinating, young Romy Schneider.

== Cast ==
- Romy Schneider as Anne-Claire Jouvain
- Horst Buchholz as (main) Monpti
- Mara Lane as Nadine
- Boy Gobert as (second) Monpti
- Olive Moorefield as Zaza
- Bum Krüger as man from No. 17
- Iska Geri as woman from No. 17
- Bobby Todd as Fliegenäugiger
- Joseph Offenbach as editorial secretary
- Helmut Käutner as narrator
- Willibald Eser as an acquaintance of (second) Monpti

== Sources ==
- Gábor von Vaszary: Monpti. Roman. (Translated into German by the author.) Thiele, Munich and Vienna (2009). ISBN 978-3-85179-015-3
