= A Glass of Water (1923 film) =

1923 film directed by Ludwig Berger

- German: Ein Glas Wasser
- Directed by: Ludwig Berger
- Written by: Adolf Lantz; Ludwig Berger
- Based on: A Glass of Water by Eugène Scribe
- Produced by: Erich Pommer
- Starring: Mady Christians; Lucie Höflich; Hans Brausewetter; Rudolf Rittner
- Cinematography: Günther Krampf; Erich Waschneck
- Music by: Bruno Schulz
- Production company: Decla-Bioscop
- Distributed by: UFA
- Release date: 1 February 1923
- Country: Germany
- Languages: Silent; German intertitles

A Glass of Water (German: Ein Glas Wasser) is a 1923 German silent comedy film directed by Ludwig Berger and starring Mady Christians, Lucie Höflich and Hans Brausewetter. It premiered at the UFA-Palast am Zoo on 1 February 1923. It was based on a play of the same title by Eugène Scribe, set in England during the reign of Queen Anne. The film was very well received both commercially and critically on its release. It is considered one of the milestones of Weimar cinema.

The film's sets were designed by the art director Rudolf Bamberger. It was made at the Babelsberg Studios in Berlin with location shooting in Bayreuth.

== Cast ==
- Mady Christians as Queen Anne
- Lucie Höflich as the Duchess of Marlborough
- Hans Brausewetter as John William Masham (a fictionalised version of Samuel Masham)
- Rudolf Rittner as Lord Henry Bolingbroke (a fictionalised version of Henry St John, 1st Viscount Bolingbroke)
- Helga Thomas as Abigail
- Hugo Döblin as Tomwood the jeweller
- Hans Wassmann as Lord Richard Scott
- Bruno Decarli as Marquis Torcy
- Max Gülstorff as Thompson
- Franz Jackson as Hassan
- Henry Stuart
- Joseph Römer
- Gertrud Wolle

== See also ==
- A Glass of Water (1960)
