= Yury Saulsky =

Yuri Saulsky

Background information
- Born: Yuri Sergeyevich Saulsky
- Occupations: Composer; film score composer; conductor
- Awards: Order "For Merit to the Fatherland", 4th class (1998); Order of Friendship of Peoples (1986); People's Artist of the RSFSR (1990); Honored Art Worker of the RSFSR (1978); President of the Russian Federation Prize (1999)

Yury Sergeevitch Saulsky (Russian: Юрий Серге́евич Саульский) was a Soviet and Russian composer, author. His works as a film composer include the score for A Glass of Water.
