= The Savior (1971 film) =

- Directed by: Michel Mardore
- Written by: Michel Mardore
- Based on: The Savior by Michel Mardore
- Produced by: Michel Mardore
- Starring: Horst Buchholz; Muriel Catala
- Cinematography: William Lubtchansky
- Edited by: Françoise Bonnot
- Music by: Pierre Jansen
- Production company: Nadja Films
- Distributed by: Nadja Films
- Release date: 1 September 1971
- Running time: 105 minutes
- Country: France
- Language: French

Le Saveur is a 1971 French film directed by Michel Mardore, adapted from his own novel, and starring Horst Buchholz and Muriel Catala. Set in occupied France in 1943 Buchholz plays a supposed wounded English airman, Claude, and Catala plays the girl Nannette who falls for him. The supposed airman is soon revealed to be a cruel Nazi officer.

== Plot ==
In occupied France, a small rural village, a young girl takes in a slightly wounded English airman and, hiding him from her parents, who are staunch supporters of Pétain, installs him in the attic of her farmhouse. Nanette quickly feels unknown feelings awakening within her, desire, love, when she meets this young, handsome man, who explains to her that the ideas she has learned at school about the English and the Germans are false. And the days pass happily. They almost forget that the war has been going on for four years already. One day, the Englishman decides to make contact with a group of resistance fighters through Monsieur Flouret. Nanette, accustomed to the presence of her toy man, furious to see him moving away from her, reports him to the police. Then the unbelievable happens: ‘the Englishman’ appears before her wearing the uniform of the SS chief. As she stands there stunned, the ‘fake Englishman, real German’ explains to Nanette that he has used her love and hatred as a little girl to rid the region of the maquisards, the resistance fighters whom she had unwittingly handed over to him. He then gathered the village population and ordered Nanette, who had been compromised, to give the order for their execution. She burst into tears. Twenty years later, the German returned to the scene of the massacre. Nanette, prematurely aged and barely recognisable, killed him with a rifle.

== Production ==
Michel Mardore said he asked Muriel Catalá to shave her pubes to accentuate her childlike appearance. "This should have sold the film in Japan, since the Japanese abhor pubic hair and only accept the female nude when the woman is shaved..."
