= A Glass of Water (1960 film) =

1960 film directed by Helmut Käutner

- German film poster
- German: Ein Glas Wasser
- Directed by: Helmut Käutner
- Written by: Eugène Scribe (play); Helmut Käutner; Willibald Eser
- Produced by: Georg Richter
- Starring: Gustaf Gründgens; Liselotte Pulver; Sabine Sinjen
- Cinematography: Günther Anders
- Edited by: Klaus Dudenhöfer
- Music by: Bernhard Eichhorn
- Production company: Deutsche Film Hansa
- Distributed by: Deutsche Film Hansa
- Release date: 6 July 1960
- Running time: 81 minutes
- Country: West Germany
- Language: German

A Glass of Water (German: Das Glas Wasser) is a 1960 West German comedy-musical film directed by Helmut Käutner and starring Gustaf Gründgens, Liselotte Pulver and Sabine Sinjen. It was entered into the 10th Berlin International Film Festival. It is an adaptation of the 1840 French play Le verre d'eau by Eugène Scribe and is set in London in 1710 during the War of the Spanish Succession. It was shot at the Wandsbek Studios in Hamburg. The film's sets were designed by the art director Albrecht Becker and Herbert Kirchhoff.

== Plot ==
Still young and inexperienced, Anne, Queen of Great Britain is a weak puppet-queen under the influence of Sarah Churchill, whose intrigues are an attempt to paint her war-mongering husband, the Duke of Marlborough, in a better light. However, Henry St. John, a noble journalist and leader of the opposition, is also trying to influence the queen - he wants to end the war with France as soon as possible and by any means necessary.

Sarah is not averse to romantic adventures and so becomes the patron of the young country lord Arthur Masham, unceremoniously making him an ensign in the queen's guards. However, Henry St. John sees through the plan, knowing that Masham is engaged to Abigail, a jealous shop assistant in a jewellery store, who he wants to win for himself.

Masham kills a very rich cousin of Henry in a duel. Henry thus inherits a huge fortune and the title Lord Bolingbroke. He wins the next round of intrigues, getting a position in the queen's court for Abigail and thus gaining influence there for himself. Via Abigail he learns that the queen has her eye on Masham without him being aware of it. As a signal for a planned rendezvous, she wants to pass him a glass of water during a ball. Henry thus explains to Sarah that she has a rival, but does not name names. However, at the queen's next ball she vies with the queen for Masham's favour and then panics, meaning both she and Masham have to resign their roles as the queen's confidantes.

Even so, the tide seems to be turning in Sarah's favour when she and a few other ladies surprise the queen during a night-time meeting with Masham. However, Henry is ready - he arrives immediately and saves the queen with a white lie. He thus becomes her sole advisor and Sarah's fate is sealed - she is banished from court and Marlborough is dismissed - leaving Henry as prime minister at the head of a new cabinet, whose first task will be to resume peace negotiations with France.

== Cast ==
- Gustaf Gründgens as Sir Henry St. John (a fictionalisation of Henry St John, 1st Viscount Bolingbroke)
- Liselotte Pulver as Queen Anne
- Sabine Sinjen as Abigail
- Hilde Krahl as Lady Churchill, Duchess of Marlborough
- Horst Janson as Masham (a fictionalization of Samuel Masham)
- Rudolf Forster as Marquis de Torcy (a fictionalization of Jean-Baptiste Colbert, Marquess of Torcy)
- Hans Leibelt as butler
- Bobby Todd as Maitre de plaisir
- Joachim Rake as Lord Avondale
- Herbert Weissbach as Beichvater
- Sybille Kien as Duchess' maid
- Holger Hagen as Lord Avondale

== See also ==
- A Glass of Water (1923)
