= The Lady with the Parrot =

The Lady with the parrot
- Directed by: Andrei Prachenko
- Written by: Mykhailo Illienko
- Starring: Aleksei Zharkov; Svetlana Smirnova
- Cinematography: Vasiliy Trushkovskiy
- Music by: Vadim Khrapachyov
- Production company: Dovzhenko Film Studios
- Release date: 1988
- Running time: 99 minutes
- Country: Soviet Union
- Language: Russian

The Lady with the parrot (Russian: Дама с попугаем, romanized: Dama s popugaem) is a 1988 Soviet romantic comedy directed by Andrei Prachenko.

== Plot ==
Every year Sergei Zverev goes on vacation to the Black Sea coast. During this time he leads the life of a real wealthy playboy. Imported clothes, a cassette tape recorder, a polaroid camera, stories of how he traveled as a pilot of international flights around the world... all this creates the status of an irresistible man for Sergei, whose charms no "simple Soviet woman" can withstand. However, the unexpected happens: Sergei genuinely falls in love with a very beautiful but strange woman, who carries a cage with a talking parrot everywhere. The woman calmly rejects all of Sergei's "patterned" courtship, she reports that she has a son who is an excellent student and a prodigy, and that she is married, but all this only fuels Zverev's interest. From time to time, Sergei is annoyed by a certain teenager named Aleksei, who came for holidays to a pioneer camp, but because of his behavior is constantly subjected to disciplinary punishment. As a result, the "disobedient" pioneer is expelled from the camp, and the lady with the parrot, without saying goodbye to Sergei, also disappears.

Zverev returns to Moscow, and it turns out that there is no "playboy" but only a well-organized "screen". In fact, Sergei works as a simple aircraft technician at the Sheremetyevo-2 airport, and all the foreign accessories he brags to girls at sea are rented: the tape recorder, camera, and even sunglasses! Zverev begins his "ordinary" inexpressive life, but now he has a goal: to find the woman with whom Sergei fell in love. Alas, Sergei's search is futile, but here he is unexpectedly found by Aleksei, that same hooligan teenager. Having become attached to the boy with a father's sympathy, Zverev tries to help the "difficult" teenager. In turn, Aleksei, deeply pained by the fact that he is brought up by a single mother, tries to present Zverev in school as his father. The scandal that arises in this regard ends in the police department, where Aleksei's mother - the very same "lady with a parrot" - comes running.

== Cast ==
- Aleksei Zharkov as Sergei Alekseevich Zverev
- Svetlana Smirnova as Elena Ivanovna Stepantsova
- Dmitry Kopp as Aleksei Stepantsov, Elena's son
- Maria Vinogradova as Sergei's mother
- Stanislav Sadalsky as Gennady Fedorov
- Tatyana Lyutaeva as Milochka
- Albert Filozov as Aristarch
- Bohdan Beniuk as director of the pioneer camp
- Nikolai Gudz as Gennady, friend on the beach
- Sergei Ivanov as Victor, the driver airport
- Aleksandr Vokach as cardiologist
