= Erik Schumann =

German actor

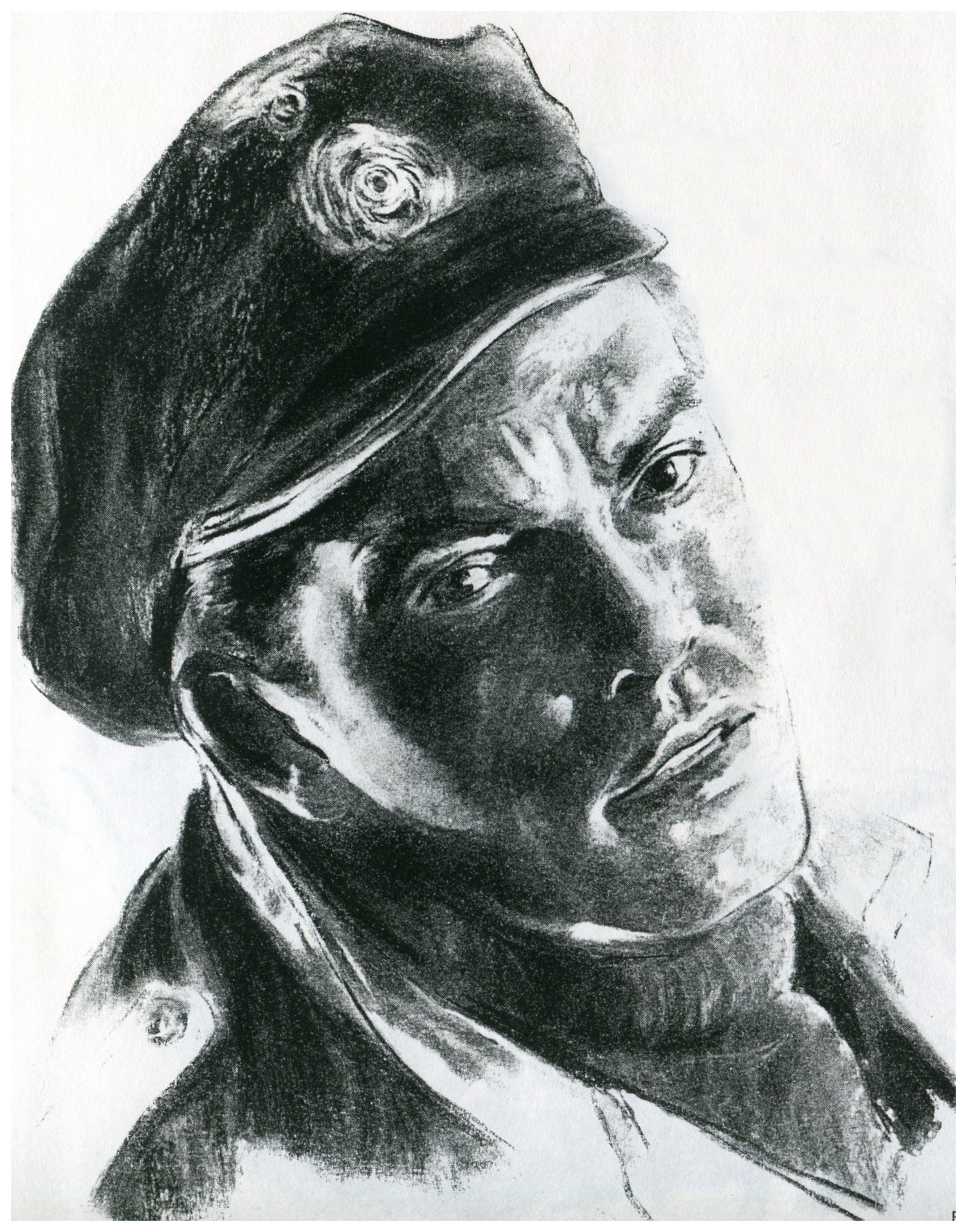
- Schumann in a 1959 drawing by Helmuth Ellgaard
- Born: 15 February 1925; Grechwitz, Germany
- Died: 9 February 2007 (aged 81); Straßlach, Munich, Germany
- Occupation: Actor
- Years active: 1942–2003

Erik Schumann (15 February 1925 – 9 February 2007) was a German actor. He appeared in 100 films and television shows between 1942 and 1997. He was most successful during the 1950s and 1960s, when he played leading roles in several German films. He starred in the 1964 film Time of the Innocent, which was entered into the 14th Berlin International Film Festival. Schumann also worked as a stage and dubbing-voice actor in German synchronisations. Among his dubbing roles were Tony Curtis in Some Like It Hot, Cary Grant in Bringing Up Baby and Jack Nicholson in Prizzi's Honor. He also performed the German voice of Stinky Pete in Pixar's third feature film Toy Story 2, originally performed by Kelsey Grammer.

== Filmography ==
Year	Title	Role	Notes
1942	Sky Hounds	Werner Gundler, Himmelshund	
1950	Dr. Semmelweis	Student	
1950	The Benthin Family	Hans Bodmer	
1954	Consul Strotthoff	Hans Hellmer	
1955	Reaching for the Stars	Turell	
1955	Sky Without Stars	Carl Altmann	
1956	Studentin Helene Willfüer	Dr. Stefan Rainer	
1956	Regine	Martin Lund	
1956	Magic Fire	Hans von Bülow	
1956	Johannisnacht	Lorenz von Hergeth	
1956	Heiße Ernte	Konrad Stammer	
1957	Junger Mann, der alles kann	Tom	
1957	Europas neue Musikparade 1958	Peter Krüger	
1957	A Piece of Heaven	Ronald Henning	
1958	Ein Stück vom Himmel	Ronald Henning	
1958	Restless Night	Hauptmann von Arnim	
1958	The Two-Headed Spy	Lieutenant Reinisch	
1958	Father, Mother and Nine Children	Francois Dupont	
1959	Of Course, the Motorists	Walter Schliewen	
1959	That's No Way to Land a Man	Stefan Reimer	
1960	Darkness Fell on Gotenhafen	Hans Schott	
1960	We Cellar Children	Ulrikes Freund	
1960	Officer Factory	Hauptmann Rathshelm	
1961	Question 7	Rolf Starke	
1961	Barbara	Dr. Nielsson	
1962	The Counterfeit Traitor	Nazi Gunboat Officer	
1962	I Must Go to the City	Dr. Werner Koch	
1963	Miracle of the White Stallions	Capt. Ranhoff	
1963	Durchbruch Lok 234	Harry Dölling	
1964	Time of the Innocent		
1965	Old Surehand	Capt. Miller	
1966	Melissa	Don Page	TV miniseries, 3 episodes
1966	Call Girls of Frankfurt	Alphons Tewes	
1967	Das Rasthaus der grausamen Puppen	Bob Fishman	
1967	When Night Falls on the Reeperbahn	Danny Sonntag	
1968	Paradies der flotten Sünder	José Uraga	
1968	Engel der Sünde	Mecky Krüger	
1969	On the Reeperbahn at Half Past Midnight	Teddy Zakora	
1976	Albino	Captain Turnbull	
1977	Es muss nicht immer Kaviar sein	Simeon	TV miniseries, 6 episodes
1978	Slavers	Bill Parry	
1978	Who Is Killing the Great Chefs of Europe?	Auguste Grandvilliers	German version
1981	Lili Marleen	Joachim von Strehlow	
1981	Die Todesgöttin des Liebescamps	Senator Benneman	Voice, Uncredited
1982	Veronika Voss	Dr. Edel	
1983	Derrick	Herr Kessler	TV series episode: "Tödliches Rendezvous"
1985	Sprit für Spatzen		
1986	Manuel	Nassmann	
1987	The Inquiry	Flavio	
1993	E.T.A. Hoffmanns Der Sandmann	Coppola	
1999	Toy Story 2	Stinky Pete	Voice, German version
