= Siegfried Lowitz =

German actor (1914–1999)

- Lowitz in It Happened in Broad Daylight
- Born: Siegfried Wodolowitz; 22 September 1914; Berlin, Germany
- Died: 27 June 1999 (aged 84); Munich, Germany

Siegfried Lowitz (22 September 1914 – 27 June 1999) was a German actor.

Born in Berlin, he played the Hauptkommissar Erwin Köster in the German television drama Der Alte. Prior to his tenure as Hauptkommissar, he played a killer in the popular German police series Derrick.

He died at Munich in 1999.

== Filmography ==
=== Film ===
- Meines Vaters Pferde, 2. Teil: Seine dritte Frau (1954) - Zeisig, Bursche des Oberleutnant Michael Godeysen (uncredited)
- The Angel with the Flaming Sword (1954) - Krüger
- Hello, My Name is Cox (1955) - Gauner Anton Kraczyk
- Jackboot Mutiny (1955)
- Solang' es hübsche Mädchen gibt (1955)
- Hanussen (1955) - Prosecutor
- The Fisherman from Heiligensee (1955) - Gilchert
- Sky Without Stars (1955) - Hüske
- Regine (1956) - Direktor Gisevius
- Weil du arm bist, mußt du früher sterben (1956) - Arzt des Krankenhauses
- The Captain from Köpenick (1956) - Stadtkämmerer Rosenkranz
- My Father, the Actor (1956) - Ruehl, Agent
- Das Sonntagskind (1956) - Kriminalinspektor
- King in Shadow (1957) - Chamberlain Goldberg
- Rose Bernd (1957) - Judge
- The Girl and the Legend (1957) - Mr. Greene
- Haie und kleine Fische (1957) - Leutnant Pauli
- Escape from Sahara (1958) - Kapitän Gerlach
- The Doctor of Stalingrad (1958) - Walter Grosse
- The Copper (1958) - Dr. Schreiber
- I Was All His (1958) - Herr Hinze
- Confess, Doctor Corda (1958) - Inspektor Guggitz
- It Happened in Broad Daylight (1958) - Leutnant Henzi
- The Man Who Couldn't Say No (1958) - Alfons Ulrich
- Der Schinderhannes (1958) - Benzel
- Der Frosch mit der Maske (1959) - (Ober-) Inspektor Elk (German version) / (Chief) Inspector Hedge (English version)
- Headquarters State Secret (1960) - Albrecht, Hauptsturmführer
- The Black Sheep (1960) - Flambeau
- The Forger of London (1961) - Oberinspektor Bourke
- The Invisible Dr. Mabuse (1962) - Kommissar Brahm
- The Brain (1962) - Mr. Walters
- Dog Eat Dog (1964) - Bank Guard (scenes deleted)
- Der Hexer (1964) - Inspektor Warren
- The Sinister Monk (1965) - Sir Richard
- Dr. M schlägt zu (1972) - Dr. Orloff

=== Television ===
- Besuch aus der Zone (1958, TV film) - Reichert
- The Time Has Come (1960, TV series) - Inspector Kenton
- 12 Angry Men (1963, TV film) - Juror 3
- The Physicists (1964, TV film) - Inspector Richard Voß
- Die Gentlemen bitten zur Kasse (1966, TV miniseries) - Dennis MacLeod
- Biedermann und die Brandstifter (1967, TV film) - Biedermann
- Der Trinker (1967, TV film) - Schlehdorn
- Babeck (1968, TV miniseries) - Weingarten
- Der Kommissar (1969, Season 1, Episode 9 "Geld von toten Kassierern") - Louis Kranz
- Derrick (1974, Season 1, Episode 3: "Stiftungsfest") - August Bark
- Der Strick um den Hals (1975, TV miniseries) - Maître Magloire
- Der Alte (1977–1986, TV series) - Commissar Erwin Köster
- La piovra, season 6 (1992, TV series) - Milos Danick
- Anna Maria – Eine Frau geht ihren Weg (1994–1997, TV series) - Alfred Langer
