= Rübezahl (1957 film) =

1957 film

Rübezahl – Herr der Berge
- Directed by: Erich Kobler
- Written by: Konrad Lustig; Erich Kobler; Carl Springenschmid
- Produced by: Hubert Schonger
- Starring: Franz Essel; Otto Mächtlinger; Monika Greving; Bobby Todd
- Cinematography: Heinz Hölscher
- Edited by: Ilse Wienecke
- Music by: Ulrich Sommerlatte
- Production company: Schongerfilm
- Release date: 6 October 1957
- Running time: 70 minutes
- Country: West Germany
- Language: German

Rübezahl (German: Rübezahl – Herr der Berge / a.k.a. Rübezahl, der Herr der Berge) is a 1957 West German film directed by Erich Kobler. It stars Franz Essel as the title character. The film premiered on 6 October 1957 at Planie-Lichtspiele in Stuttgart.

== Plot ==
Rübezahl lives in the Giant Mountains (German: Riesengebirge). For 999 years he has not appeared among the people who live in a nearby valley. When one of his dwarfs tells him that the bad people are gaining the upper hand and the good people are calling him for help, he decides to go down to the valley and teach the bad people a lesson.

== Cast ==
- Franz Essel – Rübezahl
- Otto Mächtlinger – Glazier Steffen
- Monika Greving – Steffen's wife
- Bobby Todd – Bäuerlein Veit
- Helmut Lieber – Fischer-Paule
- Helmo Kindermann – Cousin Klaus
- Nils Clausnitzer – Farmworker
- Paul Bös – Restaurateur
- Rolf von Nauckhoff – Guest
- Dietrich Thoms – Farmer Knoll
- Georg Lehn – Robber Krips
- Franz Keck – Robber Kraps
- Elke Arendt – Waitress
- Zita Hitz – Kitchen maid Rosa
- Bettina Braun – Anne
- Claudia Bartfeld – Lene
- Toni Mang – Karli
- Fritz Wepper – uncredited

== See also ==
- Rübezahl's Wedding (1916)
