= Willibald Eser =

German screenwriter

Willibald Eser (1 September 1933 - August 2005) was a German screenwriter, notable for his work on films including A Glass of Water, Love from Paris, Temptation in the Summer Wind and The Dream of Lieschen Mueller.

== Selected filmography ==
- Love from Paris (1957)
- The Count of Luxemburg (1957)
- A Glass of Water (1960)
- Ingeborg (1960)
- The Dream of Lieschen Mueller (1961)
- How I Learned to Love Women (1966)
- Moonlighting Mistress (1970)
- Slap in the Face (1970)
- Temptation in the Summer Wind (1972)
