= The Dream of Lieschen Mueller =

1961 film directed by Helmut Käutner

- German film poster
- German: Der Traum von Lieschen Müller
- Directed by: Helmut Käutner
- Written by: Willibald Eser; Helmut Käutner
- Produced by: Ilse Kubaschewski; Georg Richter
- Starring: Sonja Ziemann; Martin Held; Cornelia Froboess
- Narrated by: Helmut Käutner
- Cinematography: Günther Senftleben
- Edited by: Klaus Dudenhöfer
- Music by: Bernhard Eichhorn
- Production company: Divina-Film
- Distributed by: Gloria Film
- Release date: 19 December 1961
- Running time: 89 minutes
- Country: West Germany
- Language: German

The Dream of Lieschen Mueller (German: Der Traum von Lieschen Müller) is a 1961 West German musical comedy film directed by Helmut Käutner and starring Sonja Ziemann, Martin Held and Cornelia Froboess.

It was made at the Spandau Studios in Berlin with sets designed by the art directors Hertha Hareiter and Otto Pischinger. It was shot in Eastmancolor.

== Cast ==
- Sonja Ziemann as Lieschen Müller
- Martin Held as Dr. Schmidt
- Cornelia Froboess as Anni
- Helmut Griem as Jan
- Peter Weck as Paul
- Georg Thomalla as reporter
- Wolfgang Neuss as chauffeur
- Karl Schönböck as hotel manager
- Bruno Fritz as Mayer, bank director
- Jo Herbst as secretary #3
- Herbert Weissbach as Bankpförtner
- Ilse Pagé as Evchen
- Hans Hessling as Uncle Joe
- Heinrich Gies
- Walter Giller as autograph hunter
- Hardy Krüger as autograph hunter
- Ruth Leuwerik as autograph hunter
- Gene Reed as solo dancer
- John Schapar as solo dancer
- Constanze Vernon
