= The Original Sin (film) =

1948 film directed by Helmut Käutner

- Directed by: Helmut Käutner
- Written by: Kurd E. Heyne; Helmut Käutner; Bobby Todd
- Produced by: Helmut Beck-Herzog
- Starring: Bobby Todd
- Cinematography: Igor Oberberg
- Edited by: Wolfgang Wehrum
- Release date: 23 November 1948
- Running time: 105 minutes
- Country: Germany
- Language: German

The Original Sin (German: Der Apfel ist ab) is a 1948 German comedy film directed by Helmut Käutner. It was entered into the 1949 Cannes Film Festival.

== Cast ==
- Bettina Moissi as Eva Meier-Eden (Eva)
- Bobby Todd as Adam Schmidt (Adam)
- Joana Maria Gorvin as Lilly Schmith (Lilith)
- Arno Assmann as Dr. Lutz (Lucifer)
- Helmut Käutner as Prof. Petri (Petrus)
- Irene von Meyendorff
- Margarete Haagen
- Thea Thiele
- Gerda Corbett
- Willy Maertens
- Nicolas Koline
- Carl Voscherau
- Bum Krüger
- Rudolf Vogel
