= Women in Hospital =

1977 film

- German: Frauenstation
- Directed by: Rolf Thiele
- Written by: Marie Louise Fischer (novel); Ted Rose; Werner P. Zibaso
- Produced by: Hans Pflüger; Walter Tjaden
- Starring: Horst Buchholz; Stephen Boyd; Lillian Müller
- Cinematography: Charly Steinberger
- Edited by: Ingrid Bichler
- Music by: Bernd Kampka
- Production company: Cinema 77
- Distributed by: Centfox
- Release date: 8 April 1977
- Running time: 85 minutes
- Country: West Germany
- Language: German

Women in Hospital (German: Frauenstation) is a 1977 West German drama film directed by Rolf Thiele and starring Horst Buchholz, Stephen Boyd, and Lillian Müller.

It was made at the Bavaria Studios in Munich. It was the final film of the director Rolf Thiele, as well as one of Stephen Boyd's final acting roles before his death that same year.

== Cast ==
- Horst Buchholz as Dr. Schumann
- Stephen Boyd as Dr. Oberhoff
- Lillian Müller as Claudia
- Karin Dor as Claudia's mother
- Pirko Zenker as Eva Overhoff
- Marina Langner as Sister Renate
- Ina Lane as Frau Wogand
- Eva Berthold as Sister Ruth
- Brigitte Stein as Dr. Holger
- Sybille Binder as Hilde, maid
- Alexandra Moser as Angelika Schneider
- Barbara Valentin as Angelika's mother
- Veronika Faber
- Herbert Fux
- Gerd Rigauer
- Fred York
