= Temptation in the Summer Wind =

1972 film

- Directed by: Rolf Thiele
- Written by: Franz Seitz
- Produced by: Franz Seitz; Rolf Kauka
- Starring: Helmut Käutner; Yvonne Furneaux; Paul Hubschmid
- Cinematography: Peter Reimer
- Edited by: Gisela Haller; Jutta Neumann
- Music by: Peter Thomas
- Production company: Rolf Kauka Film
- Distributed by: Constantin Film
- Release date: 28 December 1972
- Running time: 81 minutes
- Country: West Germany
- Language: German

Temptation in the Summer Wind (German: Versuchung im Sommerwind) is a 1972 West German romantic comedy film directed by Rolf Thiele and starring Helmut Käutner, Yvonne Furneaux, and Paul Hubschmid.

== Cast ==
- Helmut Käutner as Professor
- Yvonne Furneaux as Frau des Professors
- Paul Hubschmid as Freund des Professors
- Peter Vogel as Freund des Professors
- Friedhelm Lehmann as Freund des Professors
- Christiane Hörbiger as Assistentin des Professors
- Dominique Müller as Tochter des Professors
- Charlotte Kerr
- Alexander Allerson
- Willibald Eser
- Anita Mally
- Sandie Shaw

== Bibliography ==
- Bock, Hans-Michael; Bergfelder, Tim, eds. (2009). The Concise Cinegraph: Encyclopaedia of German Cinema. New York: Berghahn Books. ISBN 978-1-57181-655-9.
