= Johnny Banco =

1967 film

- Directed by: Yves Allégret
- Written by: Jean Vermorel; Yves Allégret; James Carter; Michel Audiard; Frédéric Valmain (novel)
- Produced by: Paul Temps; Gottfried Wegeleben
- Starring: Horst Buchholz; Sylva Koscina; Michel de Ré
- Cinematography: Michel Kelber
- Edited by: Henri Rust
- Music by: Michel Magne; Luigi Russoli
- Production companies: Films Chrysaor; Le Film d'Art; Norddeutsche Filmproduktion; Variety Film Production
- Distributed by: Constantin Film
- Release date: 11 August 1967
- Running time: 98 minutes
- Countries: France; Italy; West Germany
- Language: French

Johnny Banco is a 1967 comedy crime film directed by Yves Allégret and starring Horst Buchholz, Sylva Koscina and Michel de Ré. It was made as a co-production between France, Italy and West Germany. It was shot at the Victorine Studios in Nice. The film's sets were designed by Jean d'Eaubonne.

== Cast ==
- Horst Buchholz as Johnny Banco
- Sylva Koscina as Laureen Moore
- Michel de Ré as Orso Sebastiani
- Jean Parédès as L'Anchois
- Fée Calderon as Mignon de Brandy
- Elisabeth Wiener as Nati
- Luciana Vincenzi as Berthe
- Friedrich Joloff as Aristopoulos
- Romain Bouteille as L'Éveillée
- Walter Giller as Inspector Jakubowski

== Bibliography ==
- Bock, Hans-Michael & Bergfelder, Tim. The Concise Cinegraph: Encyclopaedia of German Cinema. Berghahn Books, 2009.
