= Kvitsund Gymnas =

Coordinates: 59°22′57″N 8°31′14″E

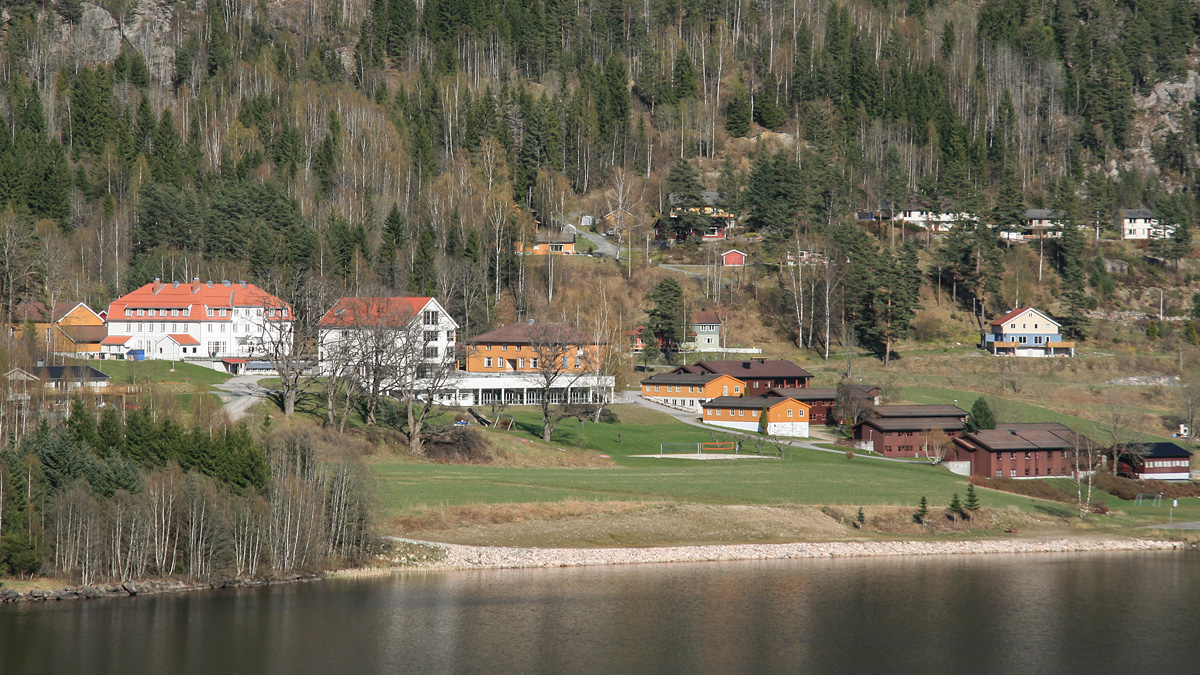
- The school seen from across lake Sundkilen.
- Kviteseid Municipality; Telemark; Norway

Information
- Type: Private school
- Principal: Magnus Kvalbein
- Website: www.kvitsund.vgs.no

Kvitsund Gymnas is a Christian boarding high school in Kviteseid Municipality, Telemark, Norway.

It is one of the few private high schools in Norway. It is privately owned by the Norwegian Lutheran Mission (NLM). The school's current principal is Edgar Gamst Kristoffersen and there are currently about 140 students admitted to the school.
