= Doris Leslie =

British novelist and biographer

Doris Leslie (née Oppenheim, later Lady Fergusson Hannay) (9 March 1891 – 30 May 1982), was a British novelist and historical biographer. Her novel Peridot Flight (1956) was serialised in 10 episodes by BBC TV in October–December 1960.

== Life ==
Leslie was born in 1890. She was the last of four children born to a Jewish couple whose family were both involved in the tobacco trade. Her father recognised her talent and sent her to art school. However she wanted to be an actress and after training she appeared in Twelfth Night at the Old Vic as Viola. She married another actor, who served in the First World War and was then killed in the flu pandemic in 1919.

A number of her books had dust jackets with illustrated designs by period artists such as Philip Gough and Arthur Barbosa.

She was married three times: in 1914 to John Leslie Isaacson (1889–1919); in 1930 to Reginald Vincent Cookes (1894–1948); and in 1936 to Walter Fergusson Leisrink Hannay, who was knighted in 1951 and died in 1961.

== Works ==
- The Starling (1927)
- Fools in Mortar (1928)
- The Echoing Green (1929)
- Terminus (1931)
- Puppets Parade (1932)
- Full Flavour (1934)
- Fair Company (1936)
- Concord in Jeopardy (1938)
- Another Cynthia: The Adventures of Cynthia, Lady Ffulkes (1780-1850), reconstructed from her hitherto unpublished memoirs (1939)
- Royal William: the Story of a Democrat (1940); life of William IV
- House in the Dust (1942)
- Polonaise (1942); a romance of Chopin
- Folly's End (1944)
- The Peverills (1946)
- Wreath for Arabella (1948); life of Lady Arabella Stuart
- That Enchantress (1950); life of Abigail Hill, Lady Marsham
- The Great Corinthian (1952); portrait of the Prince Regent
- A Toast to Lady Mary (1954); life of Lady Mary Wortley Montagu
- Peridot Flight: a novel reconstructed from the memoirs of Peridot, Lady Mulvarnie 1872-1955 (1956)
- Tales of Grace and Favour (comprising Another Cynthia, Folly's End, & The Peverills) (1956)
- As the Tree Falls(1958); later published as The King's Traitor (1971), based on the life of King Henry VIII
- The Perfect Wife (1960); based on the life of Mary Anne Disraeli
- I Return: The Story of François Villon (1962)
- This for Caroline (1964); about Lady Caroline Lamb
- Paragon Street (1965)
- The Sceptre and the Rose (1967); life of Charles II and Catherine of Braganza
- The Marriage of Martha Todd (1968)
- House in the Dust (1969)
- The Rebel Princess (1970); about Sophia Dorothea of Celle
- A Young Wives' Tale (1971)
- The Desert Queen (1972); about Lady Hester Stanhope
- Dragon's Head (1973)
- The Incredible Duchess (1974); life and times of Elizabeth Chudleigh
- Call Back Yesterday (1975)
- Notorious Lady (1976); life and times of the Countess of Blessington
- The Warrior King (1977); the reign of Richard the Lionheart
- Crown of Thorns (1979); life and reign of Richard II
