= Juris Strenga =

Latvian actor

Juris Strenga (born 13 June 1937) is a Latvian actor. He was awarded Latvia's national theatre award, Spēlmaņu nakts, for lifetime achievement in 2016. Ingrīda Strenga and Sandra Strenga are his daughters. Historian Gustavs Strenga is his son.

== Selected filmography ==
- Countermeasure (1974)
- The Arrows of Robin Hood (1975)
- A Glass of Water (1979)
- The Fairfax Millions (1980)
