= Svetlana Smirnova (actress) =

Soviet and Russian actress

- Born: Svetlana Stanislavovna Smirnova; 25 April 1956 (age 70); Yudino village, TASSR, USSR
- Occupation: Actress
- Years active: 1975-present

Svetlana Stanislavovna Smirnova (Russian: Светлана Станиславовна Смирнова; born 25 April 1956) is a Soviet and Russian film and stage actress. She was made a People's Artist of Russia in 2005. She is notable for works including A Glass of Water (1979).

== Biography ==
At the end of 1977, after the Leningrad State Institute of Theatre, Music and Cinematography, Smirnova worked in the Bryantsev Youth Theatre, she played in productions of Bambi, The Comedy of Errors, Open Lesson, and others.

In 1981-1982, she also worked at Lenfilm Studio Theatre "Time". From 1983 to 1986 she acted at Lensovet Theater in St Petersburg, and until 1992 at the Salon Theater Saint Petersburg, before moving to the troupe of Pushkin.

== Selected filmography ==
- A Glass of Water (Стакан воды, 1979) as Abigail Churchill
- The Twentieth Century Approaches (Двадцатый век начинается, 1986) as Violet Westberry
- Dead Man's Letters (Письма мёртвого человека, 1986) as Theresa
- The Prisoner of Château d'If (Узник замка Иф, 1988) as Hermine Danglar
- The Lady with the parrot (Дама с попугаем, 1988) as Elena Stepantsova
- The Life of Klim Samgin (Жизнь Клима Самгина, 1988) as Varvara Varfolomeevna Antipova
- Streets of Broken Lights (Улицы разбитых фонарей, 1998–present) as Larisa Vasilyevna Serdobolskaya
- Russian Ark (Русский ковчег, 2002)
