= The Glass of Water =

Play by Eugène Scribe

- Original language: French
- Written by: Eugene Scribe
- Setting: London, England, early 18th century

Premiere
- Date: 17 November 1840
- Place: Théâtre-Français

The Glass of Water: or, Effects and Causes (French: Le verre d’eau ou Les effets et les causes) is an 1840 five-act stage comedy by the French writer Eugène Scribe that is set at the court of Queen Anne of Great Britain during the early 18th century. It premiered at the Théâtre-Français in Paris on 17 November 1840 and has been translated into several languages, including into German in 1841 by Alexander Cosmar.

The play is a prime example of the well-made play or 'Pièce bien faite', in which all the characters' motivations are so interlocked that the action at any given point is markedly consistent in an almost positivist way, with the political and historical processes making up its theme acting perfectly logically and consistently. Its subtitle Effects and Causes clearly refers to this understanding of history and theories of progression, typical of the mid-19th century.

== Plot ==
Anne is not a strong ruler and is dominated by Sarah, Duchess of Marlborough and parliament. Sarah's husband, the Duke of Marlborough, keeps England at war in order to extract money from the subsidies used to fund the country's various battles. Sarah's greatest enemy is Lord Bolingbroke (a fictionalised version of Henry St John, 1st Viscount Bolingbroke), who wants peace, the Marlboroughs' fall from grace and the position of prime minister. Bolingbroke wants to end the War of the Spanish Succession but Sarah hopes to prolong it and thus keep her husband (who is commander-in-chief of the British army) away from court, as she hopes to pursue an affair with Masham, a young officer in the royal guard whom she has been anonymously promoting. Masham is in love with Abigail Churchill, the Duchess of Marlborough's impoverished cousin, who reciprocates his feelings. The pair both desire to marry, but are prevented from doing so by Sarah, who, keeping her identity hidden, promises to advance Masham's career only if he does not wed anyone.

The Marquis de Torcy gives Bolingbroke a letter to Queen Anne, suing for peace with France. Bolingbroke's attempt to deliver the letter to the queen via Masham is thwarted by the Duchess of Marlborough.

Bolingbroke blackmails the Duchess of Marlborough with her letters to Masham, forcing her to let Abigail Churchill, her impoverished cousin and a friend of the viscount, become one of the queen's ladies-in-waiting. The Queen confesses to Abigail that she is in love with Masham. Abigail and Bolingbroke later inform each other of their findings.

In a rage, Masham slays Bolingbroke's wicked cousin, Sir Richard Bolingbroke, after he is insulted by him. In order to further his own goals, Bolingbroke, in the presence of Queen Anne, accuses members of the opposing party of murdering his cousin. After Sarah denies these claims, Bolingbroke resolves to find and arrest the culprit. When he is alone with Abigail and Bolingbroke, Masham confesses his responsibility for Sir Richard's death. The duchess persuades the queen to force the Marquis de Torcy back to France. Using the information Abigail has given him to his advantage, Bolingbroke reveals to Queen Anne that Sarah has been using the war to keep her husband away from England, as she intends to have an affair with Masham. Queen Anne angrily admonishes Sarah for using state funds to pursue private interests.

Much to Abigail's chagrin, Masham confesses the truth about the murder to Sarah, believing her to be honest and good-hearted.

Abigail informs Bolingbroke that at a royal gathering, the Queen will complain of the heat and ask for a glass of water; this is a signal to Masham that she is able to meet him that night. Bolingbroke informs Sarah that she has a powerful rival for the affections of Masham. If the duchess lets the Marquis remain in England, Bolingbroke will give the duchess a clue as to the whereabouts of her rival. He does not reveal her identity, but tells her that she will give Masham the aforementioned signal that night.

At the royal gathering, the Duchess is overcome by the revelation that Queen Anne has designs on Masham. Consequently, she causes a scene and accidentally spills water on the queen's dress. Sarah is promptly dismissed from court, but before she leaves, she reveals that Masham is responsible for Sir Richard's death. Masham confirms that this is the truth and hands Bolingbroke his sword.

Lady Abercrombie and Robert Walpole blackmail Queen Anne into forcing the Marquis de Torcy back to France and re-appointing the Duchess of Marlborough her lady-in-waiting. Bolingbroke ultimately persuades Queen Anne to dissolve parliament and elect him Prime Minister in order to restore Masham to his position. Masham arrives in her boudoir and gives her papers to sign. The Duchess returns to the palace and eavesdrops behind the door to the queen's boudoir. Determined to compromise the queen, she returns with a crowd, who, contrary to her wishes, are clamoring for peace. Bolingbroke justifies Masham's presence by explaining that he is there to bid farewell to his sweetheart, Abigail. The people accept this explanation and Queen Anne resignedly gives the pair her blessing. When she is alone with Bolingbroke, the queen complains of the constraints of her position until her attention is drawn to a handsome ensign standing outside the palace.

== Adaptations ==
=== Stage ===
The playwright William E. Suter's truncated two-act adaptation was first performed in 1863. DeWitt Bodeen's three-act adaptation premiered at the Pasadena Playhouse in 1936. DeWitt made a number of changes to the text: he excised material while adding his own dialogue and reordering scenes. In DeWitt's version, Sarah gleefully becomes Bolingbroke's lover at the end of the play.

=== Film and Television ===
The play has been adapted for television in Sweden in 1960 as Ett Glas vatten (with Gunnel Lindblom as Anne), in Hungary in 1977 as Sakk-matt (with Judit Halász as Anne) and twice in the USSR of the same title Stakan vody (Стакан воды) (once as a 1957 television play and once as a 1979 telefilm with Natalya Belokhvostikova as Anne). It has also been adapted for film twice times in Germany (once as a 1923 silent film and once as a musical in 1960).
