= A Glass of Water (1979 film) =

1979 Soviet television film

- Стакан воды (Stakan vody)
- Based on: Le verre d'eau ou Les effets et les causes by Eugène Scribe
- Written by: Yuli Karasik
- Directed by: Yuli Karasik
- Starring: Kirill Lavrov; Alla Demidova; Natalia Belokhvostikova; Svetlana Smirnova; Peteris Gaudinsh; Igor Dmitriev; Juris Strenga
- Music by: Yuri Saulsky
- Country of origin: Soviet Union
- Original language: Russian

Production
- Cinematography: Vladimir Chukhnov
- Running time: 128 min.
- Production company: Mosfilm

Original release
- Release: 1979

A Glass of Water (Russian: Стакан воды, romanized: Stakan vody) is a 1979 Soviet historical melodramatic comedy television film directed by Yuli Karasik and based on the 1840 play of the same title by Eugène Scribe, set in the court of Queen Anne of Great Britain at the start of the 18th century. The play was previously adapted for film in Russia in 1957.

== Plot ==
Britain is in the midst of a long and ruinous war with France, the War of the Spanish Succession and its queen is completely under the control of her old friend Sarah, Duchess of Marlborough, leader of the Whig party - she wants to prolong the war to her own benefit and that of her husband John Churchill, Duke of Marlborough, commander-in-chief of the British forces. Against them are the Tories, led by Lord Bolingbroke, who believe that the war has to stop and peace talks begin. Anne supports the Whigs because she and her court are both completely subordinated to Sarah's will.

It seems nothing can shake Sarah's power and so Bolingbroke has no chance of achieving peace negotiations. However, he befriends Arthur Masham, an impoverished nobleman and officer in the royal guards who is in love with Abigail, forced to serve in a jewellery shop. Abigail and Arthur are about to get married, but this hits an obstacle when Arthur kills a cousin of Lord Bolingbroke in a duel. Anne's jeweller visits Abigail secretly and offers her a position at court, but - afraid of Sarah's intrigues and unwilling to admit their love to the queen - Arthur and Abigail decide not to lose this opportunity.

However, Bolingbroke still has power over the couple, since he knows that Arthur's secret patron - gaining him promotion and sending him gifts - is none other than Sarah herself. Bolingbroke resorts to blackmail, returning to Sarah a letter from her to Masham (which she does not want her jealous husband to see) and in exchange gaining Abigail a position at court. This finally gains him a supporter close to Anne.

Cut off from real life by Sarah, Anne is bored of spending her days caught up in court ritual. She revels in novels and dreams about falling in love. She admits to her new confidante Abigail that she has fallen in love with a young member of her guards - none other than Arthur, whose engagement to Abigail is still a secret from all but Bolingbroke. Confused, Abigail rushes to him for help and Bolingbroke realises that he finally has a way of breaking Sarah's influence over Anne. All he now needs is a way to act on it and soon he finds it, when Sarah interrupts a rendezvous between Anne and Masham. Offering Anne a glass of water, he brings about Sarah's fall.

As a result, Sarah, Duchess of Marlborough, removed from the court, Lord Bolingbroke in the new government became Minister of foreign affairs, begin peace negotiations, which ended with the signing of the Treaty of Utrecht, Abigail married Arthur Masham and becomes the favourite of the Queen, and only Queen Anne remains in a sad loneliness, deprived of the object of her love.

== Cast ==
- Kirill Lavrov - Henry St John, 1st Viscount Bolingbroke
- Alla Demidova - Sarah Churchill, Duchess of Marlborough
- Natalia Belokhvostikova - Anne, Queen of Great Britain
- Svetlana Smirnova - Abigail Hill
- Pēteris Gaudiņš - Arthur Masham
- Igor Dmitriev - Jean-Baptiste Colbert, Marquess of Torcy
- Juris Strenga - Count Stauenbauer, Austrian Ambassador
- Alexander Vokach - William Cavendish, 2nd Duke of Devonshire
- Boris Blank - artist
- George Vsevolodov - master of ceremonies
- Nikolai Yerofeyev - Oliver
- Svetlana Danilchenko
- Larisa Zhukovskaya
- Konstantin Chistyakov
- Anna Frolovtseva
- Nina Veselovskaya
