= Bobby Todd =

German actor

- Born: 22 June 1904; Hinterzarten, Germany
- Died: 7 September 1980 (aged 76); Turin, Italy
- Occupation: Actor
- Years active: 1926–1961

Bobby Todd (22 June 1904 – 7 September 1980) was a German film actor. He appeared in 34 films between 1926 and 1961.

== Selected filmography ==
- Cruiser Emden (1932)
- The Dream of Butterfly (1939)
- The Original Sin (1948)
- Hello, Fraulein! (1949)
- Dangerous Guests (1949)
- The Man in Search of Himself (1950)
- Desires (1952)
- Jonny Saves Nebrador (1953)
- The Little Town Will Go to Sleep (1954)
- Spring Song (1954)
- The Hunter's Cross (1954)
- The Forest House in Tyrol (1955)
- Love From Paris (1957)
- Rübezahl (1957)
- The Legs of Dolores (1957)
- A Glass of Water (1960)
- The Dead Eyes of London (1961)
