= Schortewitz =

- Stadtteil of Zörbig
- Interactive map of Schortewitz
- Location within Germany Location within Saxony-Anhalt
- Coordinates: 51°39′N 12°1′E
- Country: Germany
- State: Saxony-Anhalt
- District: Anhalt-Bitterfeld
- Town: Zörbig

Area
  - Total: 6.52 km^{2} (2.52 sq mi)
- Elevation: 75 m (246 ft)

Population (2006-12-31)
  - Total: 696
  - Density: 107/km^{2} (276/sq mi)
- Time zone: UTC+01:00 (CET)
  - Summer (DST): UTC+02:00 (CEST)
- Postal codes: 06369
- Dialling codes: 034975
- Website: www.schortewitz.de

Schortewitz (German pronunciation: [ˈʃɔʁtəvɪts]) is a village and a former municipality in the district of Anhalt-Bitterfeld, in Saxony-Anhalt, Germany. Since 1 March 2009, it is part of the town Zörbig.

== Geography ==
Schortewitz is located in the Fuhne lowlands, approximately seven kilometers from the core area of the town of Zörbig, and more broadly positioned between Halle (Saale) and Köthen (Anhalt). The Fuhne river forms the border with the Saalekreis district.

== History ==
The stone chest grave (Rampenkiste), once located on the Windmühlenberg hill, is the oldest evidence of human activity in the area around Schortewitz. The significant archaeological finds from the Heidenberg megalithic tomb (Großsteingrab Schortewitz), excavated in 1913 by Walter Götze, are now housed in the Prehistoric Museum in Köthen.

Schortewitz was first mentioned in a document in 1156 as Solowice. Located north of the Fuhne, the village historically always belonged to Anhalt, unlike Zörbig.

In 1844, 266 people lived in Schortewitz. Until its incorporation into Zörbig on March 1, 2009, Schortewitz belonged to the Verwaltungsgemeinschaft Südliches Anhalt municipal association.
