= Helmut Käutner =

German film director (1908–1980)

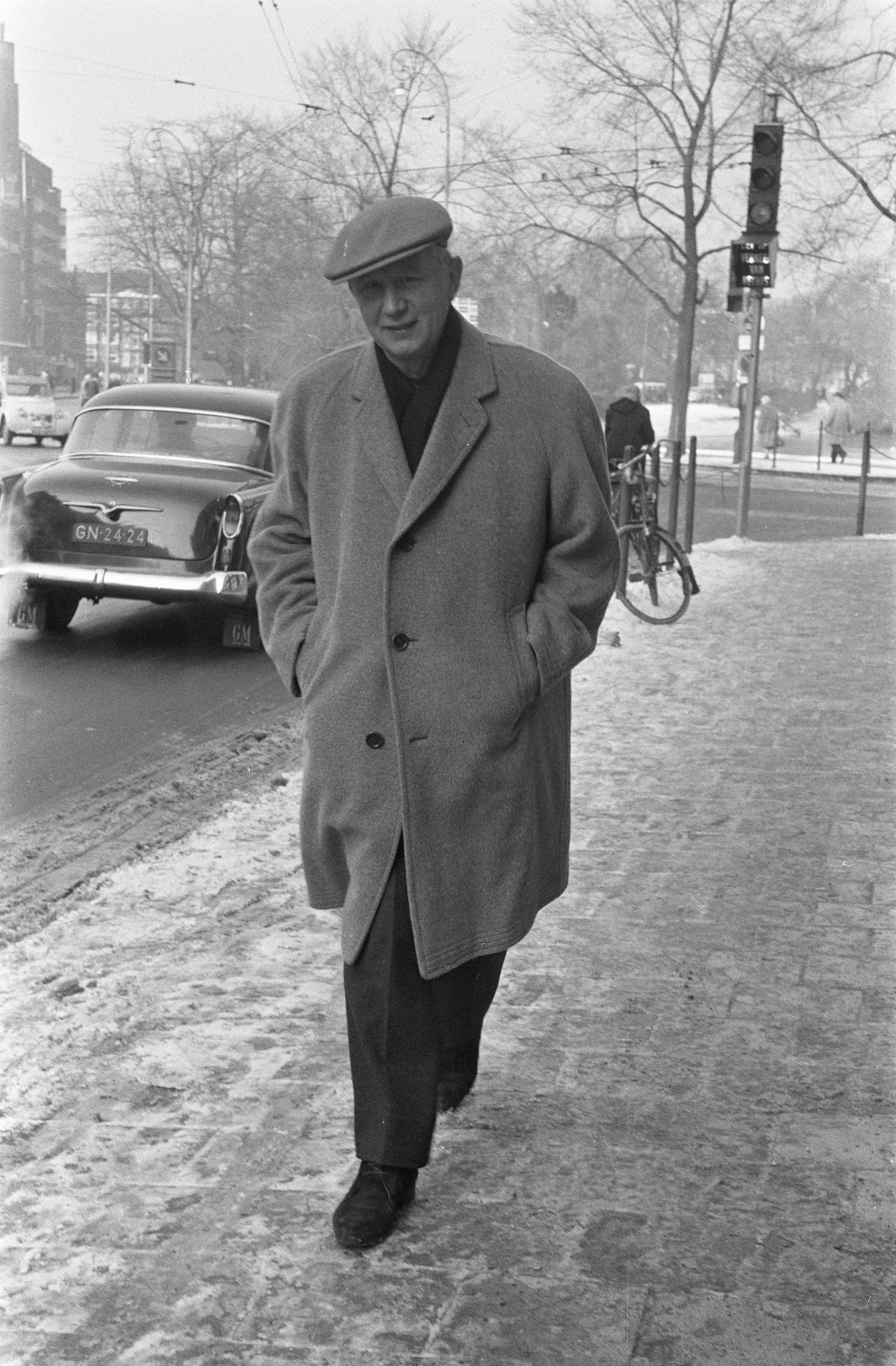
- Helmut Käutner (1960)
- Born: 25 March 1908; Düsseldorf, Rhine Province, Prussia, Germany
- Died: 20 April 1980 (aged 72); Castellina in Chianti, Province of Siena, Italy
- Occupations: Film director, actor
- Years active: 1940–1976

Signature
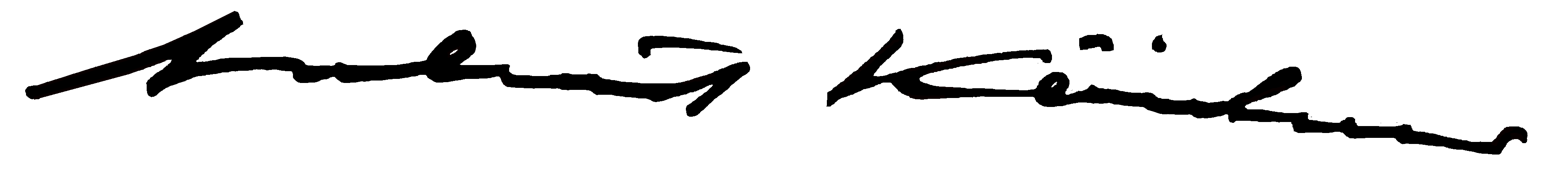

Helmut Käutner (25 March 1908 – 20 April 1980) was a German film director active mainly in the 1940s and 1950s. He entered the film industry at the end of the Weimar Republic and released his first films as a director in Nazi Germany. Käutner is relatively unknown outside of Germany, although he is considered one of the best filmmakers in German film history. He was one of the most influential film directors of German post-war cinema and became known for his sophisticated literary adaptations.

== Biography ==
He was born in Düsseldorf, Germany. Käutner started out as a director in the Nazi era, but his films remained largely free of National Socialist propaganda. One of his early successes was Romanze in Moll (1943), an adaptation of Guy du Maupassant's short story "Les Bijoux". Other remarkable films were Große Freiheit Nr. 7 and Under the Bridges.

His 1956 film Der Hauptmann von Köpenick was nominated for the Best Foreign Language Film at the 29th Academy Awards. Three years later, his film The Rest Is Silence was entered into the 9th Berlin International Film Festival. Käutner made two films for Universal Pictures in Hollywood: The Restless Years (1958) and A Stranger in My Arms (1959). However, neither of them received critical success and Käutner was unhappy with the lack of creative freedom he had, so he returned to Germany. He died in Castellina in Chianti, Italy.

== Selected filmography ==
=== Director ===
Feature Films

- Kitty and the World Conference (1939)
- Woman Made to Measure (1940)
- Clothes Make the Man (1940)
- Goodbye, Franziska (1941)
- Anuschka (1942)
- We Make Music (1942)
- Romance in a Minor Key (1943)
- Große Freiheit Nr. 7 (1944)
- Under the Bridges (1946)
- In Those Days (1947)
- The Original Sin (1948)
- Royal Children (1950)
- The Orplid Mystery (1950)
- White Shadows (1951)
- Captain Bay-Bay (1953)
- The Last Bridge (1954)
- Portrait of an Unknown Woman (1954)
- Ludwig II (1955)
- Des Teufels General (1955)
- Sky Without Stars (1955)
- The Girl from Flanders (1956)
- The Captain from Köpenick (1956)
- The Zurich Engagement (1957)
- Love from Paris (1957)
- The Restless Years (1958)
- Der Schinderhannes (1958)
- A Stranger in My Arms (1959)
- The Rest Is Silence (1959)
- The Goose of Sedan (1959)
- A Glass of Water (1960)
- Black Gravel (1961)
- The Dream of Lieschen Mueller (1961)
- Redhead (1962)
- The House in Montevideo (1963)
- Tales of a Young Scamp (1964)
- Die Feuerzangenbowle (1970)

Television

- Das Gespenst von Canterville (1964, TV film) — (based on The Canterville Ghost)
- Romulus der Große (1965, TV film) — (based on Romulus the Great)
- Die Flasche (1965, TV film) — (based on a story by Joachim Ringelnatz)
- Robin Hood, der edle Räuber (1966, TV film) — (Musical based on Robin Hood)
- Leben wie die Fürsten (1966, TV film) — (based on La Belle Vie by Jean Anouilh)
- Die spanische Puppe (1967, TV film) — (based on The Double Doll by Giles Cooper)
- Stella (1967, TV film) — (based on Goethe's play)
- Valentin Katajews chirurgische Eingriffe in das Seelenleben des Dr. Igor Igorowitsch (1967, TV film) — (based on a play by Valentin Kataev)
- Bel Ami (1968, TV film) — (based on Guy de Maupassant's Bel-Ami)
- Tagebuch eines Frauenmörders (1969, TV film) — (screenplay by István Békeffy)
- Christoph Kolumbus oder Die Entdeckung Amerikas (1969, TV film) — (based on a play by Walter Hasenclever and Kurt Tucholsky)
- Einladung ins Schloß oder Die Kunst das Spiel zu spielen (1970, TV film) — (based on Invitation to the Castle)
- Der Kommissar: Anonymer Anruf (1970, TV series episode)
- Die seltsamen Abenteuer des geheimen Kanzleisekretärs Tusmann (1972, TV film) — (based on a story by E. T. A. Hoffmann)
- Ornifle oder Der erzürnte Himmel (1972, TV film) — (based on a play by Jean Anouilh)
- Die preußische Heirat (1974, TV film) — (based on Zopf und Schwert by Karl Gutzkow)
- Derrick: Stiftungsfest (1974, TV series episode)
- Margarete in Aix (1976, TV film) — (based on a play by Peter Hacks)
- Mulligans Rückkehr (1978, TV film) — (based on a novel by Hans Frick) (final film)

=== Screenwriter ===
- Wibbel the Tailor (1939, directed by Viktor de Kowa)
- Film ohne Titel (1948, directed by Rudolf Jugert)
- Nights on the Road (1952, directed by Rudolf Jugert)

=== Actor ===
- Cruiser Emden (1932, directed by Louis Ralph), as Seaman
- A Far Country (1967, TV film, directed by Ida Ehre), as Sigmund Freud
- The Devil and the Good Lord (1967, TV film, directed by Peter Beauvais), as Archbishop
- Ein Mann namens Harry Brent (1968, TV miniseries, directed by Peter Beauvais), as Sir Gordon Towns
- Babeck (1968, TV miniseries, directed by Wolfgang Becker), as Dr. Brenner
- Bend Sinister (1970, TV film, directed by Herbert Vesely), as Adam Krug
- Der Kommissar: Messer im Rücken (1970, TV, directed by Wolfgang Staudte), as Hugo Blasek
- Hauser's Memory (1970, TV film, directed by Boris Sagal), as Dr. Kramer
- The Woman in White (1971, TV miniseries, directed by Wilhelm Semmelroth), as Sir Frederic Fairlie
- Tatort: Der Richter in Weiss (1971, TV, directed by Peter Schulze-Rohr), as Professor Kemm
- Temptation in the Summer Wind (1972, directed by Rolf Thiele), as Professor Bomhard
- Van der Valk und die Reichen (1973, TV film, directed by Wolfgang Petersen), as Canisius
- Karl May (1974, directed by Hans-Jürgen Syberberg), as Karl May
- Derrick: Nur Aufregungen für Rohn (1975, TV, directed by Wolfgang Becker), as Paul Seibach
- Derrick: Auf eigene Faust (1976, TV, directed by Zbyněk Brynych), as Duktus

== Literature ==
- Hans-Jürgen Tast: Helmut Käutner – Unter den Brücken. 1944/45. Schellerten: Kulleraugen, 2007; ISBN 978-3-88842-033-7
- Hans-Jürgen Tast: Helmut Käutner – In jenen Tagen. 1947. Schellerten: Kulleraugen, 2007; ISBN 978-3-88842-034-4
