= Abigail Masham, Baroness Masham =

English courtier

The Right Honourable The Lady Masham
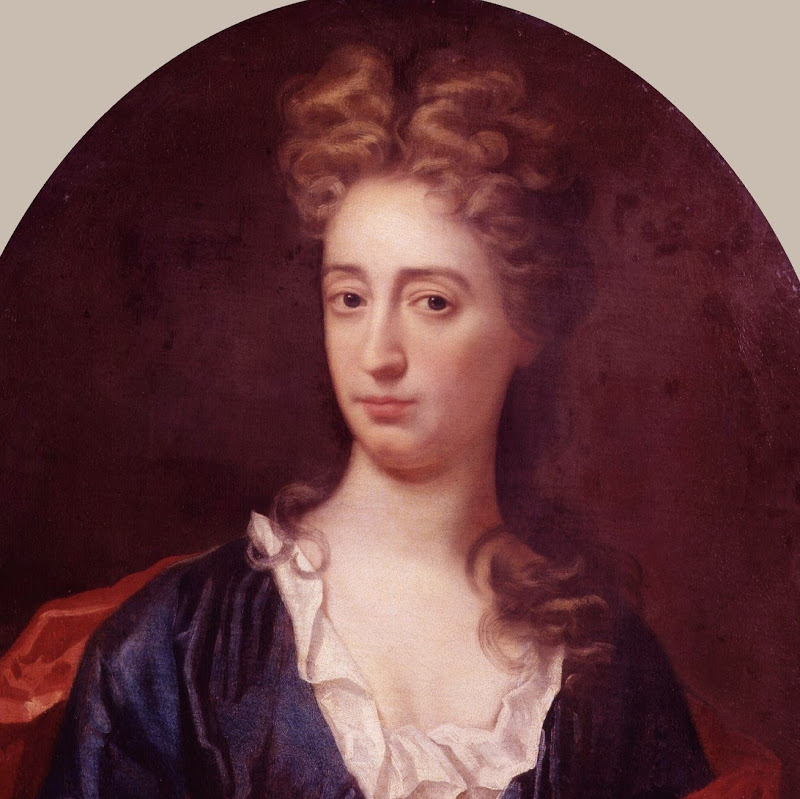

Keeper of the Privy Purse
- In office 1711–1714
- Monarch: Anne
- Preceded by: The Duchess of Marlborough
- Succeeded by: Caspar Henning

Personal details
- Born: Abigail Hill c. 1670 London, England
- Died: 6 December 1734 (aged c. 64) High Laver, Essex, England
- Resting place: High Laver, Essex
- Spouse: Samuel Masham (m. 1707)
- Children: 5
- Parent(s): Francis Hill; Elizabeth Jennings

Abigail Masham, Baroness Masham (née Hill; c. 1670 – 6 December 1734), was an English courtier. She was a favourite of Queen Anne, and a cousin of Sarah, Duchess of Marlborough.

== Life ==
=== Early life ===
Abigail Hill was the daughter of Francis Hill, a London merchant, and Elizabeth Hill (née Jennings). Elizabeth Hill was an aunt of Sarah Jennings, later Duchess of Marlborough. The family was reduced to poor circumstances through her father's speculations, and Abigail was forced to work as a servant for Sir John Rivers of Kent.

Abigail was befriended by her first cousin Sarah Jennings, or Lady Churchill (as the duchess was then known), who was Lady of the Bedchamber to Princess Anne. Sarah's friendship towards Abigail may have derived from embarrassment that her cousin had fallen on such hard times rather than being based on any genuine affection.

Sarah Churchill's claim that she had only recently, and quite by chance, become aware of Abigail's existence was justifiable, as their mutual grandfather Sir John Jennings had 22 children, and Sarah may well not have known of all her numerous first cousins. Sarah Churchill took Abigail into her own household at St. Albans. After the accession of Princess Anne to the throne in 1702, Abigail received an appointment in the Queen's Household about the year 1704.

=== The Queen's favourite ===
By 1704, the Queen had grown weary of both the frequent absences of Sarah, Duchess of Marlborough (as Sarah had now become), from the Court and her political lectures. There was a significant difference between them because Sarah, the Duchess, was a Whig and Anne was a Tory. Sarah wanted Queen Anne to appoint more Whig ministers, the majority of whom were in favour of the 1st Duke of Marlborough's campaigns in The War Of Spanish Succession. The Queen, not prepared to abandon the "Church Party" (as the Tories were commonly known, and religion being Anne's chief concern) even for her favourite, confided to her Lord Treasurer, the 1st Earl of Godolphin, that she did not feel that she and Sarah could ever be true friends again.

It was not long before Abigail Hill began to supplant her powerful and imperious kinswoman in the favour of Queen Anne. Whether Abigail was guilty of the deliberate ingratitude charged against her by Sarah, Duchess of Marlborough, is uncertain. It is likely that Abigail's influence over the Queen was not so much due to subtle scheming on her part as to the contrast between her gentle and genial character and the stronger temper of the Duchess: Sarah's influence, after many years of undisputed sway, had perhaps finally become intolerable to the Queen.

The first intimation that Sarah Churchill had of her protégée's growing favour with the Queen came to her in the summer of 1707. She learned that Abigail Hill had been privately married to Samuel Masham, a gentleman of the Queen's Household: the Queen had been present at the marriage. Sarah then found out that Abigail had, for some time, enjoyed considerable intimacy with her royal mistress, no hint of which had previously reached the Duchess. Abigail was also, on her father's side, a cousin of Robert Harley (his mother Abigail Stephens was a niece of her grandmother, also named Abigail Stephens), and after Harley's dismissal from office in February 1708, she assisted him in maintaining confidential relations with the Queen. Harley was later created, in May 1711, the 1st Earl of Oxford and Earl Mortimer.

The completion of Abigail's ascendancy was seen in 1710 when the Queen compelled Marlborough, much against his will, to give an important command to Colonel John Hill, Abigail's brother. Sunderland, Godolphin, and the other Whig ministers were soon dismissed from office, largely through Abigail's influence, to make way for Harley and Bolingbroke.

In the following year, although she was Duchess of Marlborough, Sarah was dismissed from Court. Abigail, now known as Lady Masham, took her place as Keeper of the Privy Purse. In 1711, the ministers, intent on bringing about the disgrace of Marlborough and arranging the Peace of Utrecht, found it necessary to secure their position in the House of Lords by creating 12 new peers known as Harley's Dozen. One of them was Samuel Masham, Abigail's husband, who was created Baron Masham, though the Queen showed some reluctance to raise her bedchamber woman to a position in which she might prove herself less ready to give her personal services to the Queen. Lady Masham remained as a Woman of the Bedchamber as of 1713.

Abigail soon quarrelled with Harley, who was now known as Lord Oxford and Mortimer, and set herself to foster by all the means in her power the Queen's growing personal distaste for her minister. Harley's vacillation between the Jacobites and the adherents of the Hanoverian succession to the Crown probably strengthened the opposition of Abigail, who now warmly favoured the Jacobite party led by Bolingbroke and Francis Atterbury.

Altercations took place in the Queen's presence between Abigail and the minister. Finally, on 27 July 1714, Anne dismissed Lord Oxford and Mortimer (as Harley was now known) from his office of Lord High Treasurer, and three days later gave the staff to the 1st Duke of Shrewsbury. Anne died on 1 August 1714, aged 49. Abigail then retired into private life and lived quietly at her country house Otes until her death in 1734. She is buried in the churchyard of All Saints in the village of High Laver in Essex.

== In popular culture ==
Abigail Masham is portrayed by American actress Emma Stone in the 2018 film The Favourite. She is also portrayed by Svetlana Smirnova in the 1979 Soviet movie A Glass of Water, based on an 1840 play of the same name. She is portrayed by Jill Balcon in the 1969 BBC series The First Churchills.

== Sources ==
- Mistress Masham's Repose by T.H. White (published in 1946) makes specific reference to Abigail, Baroness Masham.
- That Enchantress: Life of Abigail Hill, Lady Marsham by Doris Leslie (1950)
- Unknown woman, formerly known as Abigail Hill, National Portrait Gallery
- Lady Masham – English School – identified by comparison with the NPG portrait

Court offices
Preceded by The Duchess of Marlborough	Keeper of the Privy Purse; 1711–1714	Succeeded by Caspar Frederick Henning
