= Neue Deutsche Filmgesellschaft =

German film production company

The Neue Deutsche Filmgesellschaft (NDF) is a German film production company headquartered in Unterföhring near Munich, with locations in Berlin, Hamburg and Cologne. ndF is one of the largest independent film production companies in Germany. It was established in 1947 by director Harald Braun and author Jacob Geis, who received the authority to proceed from interim government official Erich Pommer, at that time the highest film officer in the American sector in Germany after the Second World War.

The company produces television and motion picture films, series and international co-productions.
