= Samuel Masham, 1st Baron Masham =

British soldier and politician

Brigadier-General The Right Honourable The Lord Masham

King's Remembrancer
- In office 1716–1758
- Preceded by: Simon Fanshawe, 5th Viscount Fanshawe
- Succeeded by: Samuel Masham, 2nd Baron Masham

Cofferer of the Household
- In office 1711–1714
- Preceded by: Viscount Rialton
- Succeeded by: Earl of Godolphin

Personal details
- Born: Samuel Masham; 1678/1679 High Laver, Essex, England
- Died: 1758 (aged 78–80) London, England
- Party: Tory
- Spouse: Abigail Hill (m. 1707; died 1734)
- Children: 5
- Parent(s): Sir Francis Masham; Mary Scott

Brigadier-General Samuel Masham, 1st Baron Masham (1678/79 – 1758), was a British courtier in the court of Queen Anne, and the husband of her favourite, Abigail, Lady Masham.

== Biography ==
Masham was born 1678/79, the eighth son of Sir Francis Masham, 3rd Baronet, and Mary Scott, in Otes in High Laver, the same house where John Locke had spent his final years. He was introduced to the Royal Household as page to Prince George of Denmark, the husband of the future Queen Anne. In 1701, he was promoted to the position of equerry. He was commissioned a captain in the 2nd Regiment of Foot Guards on 10 January 1704, and breveted a colonel of foot on 20 October.

He met his future wife, Abigail Hill, in about 1704, when she was appointed Lady of the Bedchamber to Anne, who was now Queen. This was the year that the Queen confided to the Earl of Godolphin that she did not believe that she and Sarah Churchill, Duchess of Marlborough – her closest friend up until now – could ever be true friends again. The Duchess, a Whig, was frequently absent from the Court, sometimes for long periods, and had become too overbearing for the Queen. Abigail, a Tory – helped by her flattery and subservience – quickly began to supplant the Duchess in the Queen's affections.

The Tory leader, Robert Harley, probably advised Masham of the advantages of marrying a royal favourite. However, Masham himself described it as a love match. The couple were married some time in 1707, in the presence of the Queen who contributed £2,000 to Abigail's dowry. The duchess, who was not consulted, learned about the marriage several months later and her subsequent argument with the Queen included accusations of lesbianism. This turned the Queen completely against her and paved the way for Abigail's rise.

Meanwhile, Masham was enjoying the rewards of Abigail's position. He was promoted to brigadier general in the army, and in 1710 became MP for Ilchester. In 1712, Robert Harley, now Earl of Oxford and Earl Mortimer, requested that the Queen create twelve new peers to pass negotiations for the Treaty of Utrecht which the Whigs were firmly against. Masham was one of those suggested to the Queen; but she only consented on the condition that Abigail continued to act as her dresser (a peeress was not expected to carry out the more menial duties of the bedchamber). He became Baron Masham of Otes, one of the twelve new creations known as "Harley's Dozen".

After Queen Anne's death in 1714, the new king, George I, reinstated the Whigs – and the Marlboroughs – to favour. Abigail retired into private life, but Samuel Masham became King's Remembrancer in 1716. He died in 1758, long outliving his wife.

== In popular culture ==
Samuel Masham has been portrayed by Gordon Whiting in the 1969 BBC television series The First Churchills, and by actor Joe Alwyn in the 2018 film The Favourite.

== Sources ==
- Frances Harris (2004). "Masham, Abigail, Lady Masham (1670?–1734)". Oxford Dictionary of National Biography (online ed.). Oxford University Press. doi:10.1093/ref:odnb/18261. (Subscription, Wikipedia Library access or UK public library membership required.)

Parliament of Great Britain
Preceded by Edward Phelips; James Johnston	Member of Parliament for Ilchester with Edward Phelips; 1710–1711	Succeeded by Edward Phelips; Sir James Bateman
Preceded by Richard Topham; William Paul	Member of Parliament for Windsor with Richard Topham; 1711–1712	Succeeded by Richard Topham; Charles Aldworth
Political offices
Preceded by Viscount Rialton	Cofferer of the Household; 1711–1714	Succeeded by The Earl of Godolphin
Preceded by The Viscount Fanshawe	King's Remembrancer; 1716–1758	Succeeded by The Lord Masham
Peerage of Great Britain
New creation	Baron Masham; 1712–1758	Succeeded by Samuel Masham
Baronetage of England
Preceded by Francis Masham	Baronet (of High Lever); 1723–1758	Succeeded by Samuel Masham
