= The House in Montevideo =

The House in Montevideo (German: Das Haus in Montevideo) may refer to:

- The House in Montevideo (play), a 1945 German comedy play by Curt Goetz
- The House in Montevideo (1951 film), a film adaptation directed by Goetz and Valerie von Martens
- The House in Montevideo (1963 film), a film adaptation directed by Helmut Käutner
