= Praetorius (film) =

1965 film

- Directed by: Kurt Hoffmann
- Written by: Curt Goetz (play); Heinz Pauck; István Békeffy
- Produced by: Hans Domnick; Heinz Angermeyer
- Starring: Heinz Rühmann; Liselotte Pulver; Fritz Tillmann
- Cinematography: Richard Angst
- Edited by: Dagmar Hirtz
- Music by: Franz Grothe
- Production companies: Hans Domnick Filmproduktion; Independent Film
- Distributed by: Constantin Film
- Release date: 14 January 1965
- Running time: 92 minutes
- Country: West Germany
- Language: German

Praetorius (German: Dr. med. Hiob Prätorius) is a 1965 West German comedy film directed by Kurt Hoffmann and starring Heinz Rühmann, Liselotte Pulver and Fritz Tillmann. The film was shot at the Bavaria Studios in Munich. It was based on a play by Curt Goetz which had previously been turned into the 1950 German film Doctor Praetorius and the 1951 Hollywood film People Will Talk.

== Cast ==
- Heinz Rühmann as Dr. Hiob Prätorius
- Liselotte Pulver as Violetta
- Fritz Tillmann as Dr. Klotz
- Fritz Rasp as Shunderson
- Werner Hinz as Violettas Vater
- Peter Lühr as Professor Speiter
- Klaus Schwarzkopf as Dr. Watzmann
- Käthe Itter as Oberschwester
- Robert Klupp as Rektor
- Marie Ferron
- Tatjana Sais
- Lisa Helwig
- Sigrid Pawlas
- Rosl Mayr as Haushälterin
- Wilhelm Meyer
- Edith Schultze-Westrum
- Sibylle Tewes

== Bibliography ==
- Goble, Alan. The Complete Index to Literary Sources in Film. Walter de Gruyter, 1999.
