= Werner Finck =

German comedian, actor and author

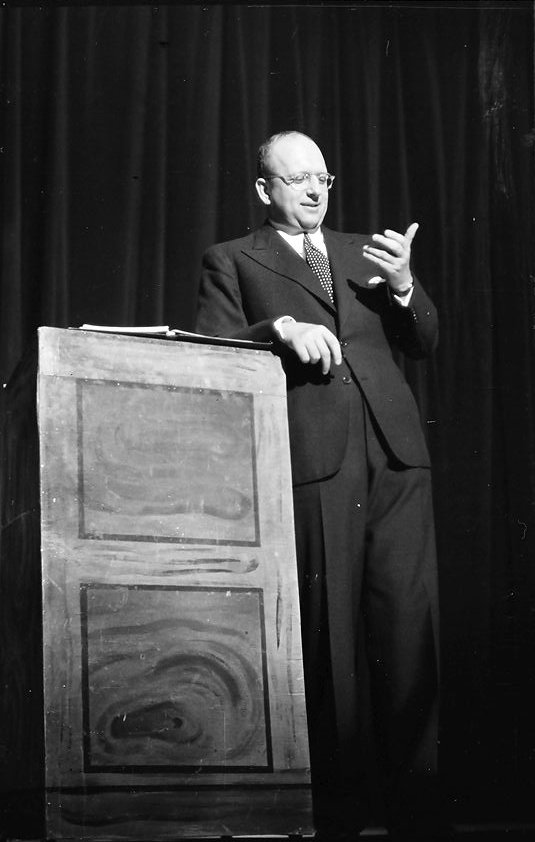
Finck in 1937

Werner Finck (2 May 1902 – 31 July 1978) was a German Kabarett comedian, actor and author. Not politically motivated by his own admission but just a "convinced individualist", he became one of Germany's leading cabaret artists under the conditions of the Nazi suppression after 1933.

== Biography ==
Born in Görlitz in Prussian Silesia, the son of a pharmacist, Finck attended an art school in Dresden and began his career as an itinerant storyteller of fairy tales in the 1920s. He took acting lessons and began a mediocre tenure in the theatre, making his debut in Silesian Bunzlau (present-day Bolesławiec, Poland). However, it became obvious that he had "comic bones" and when he met a friend who had contacts in the Berlin Kabarett scene, he found his true calling.

Together with artists like Hans Deppe, Rudolf Platte and Robert A. Stemmle he founded the cabaret Die Katakombe with some friends in 1929. Finck acted as conferencier, and the cabaret became successful because of his critical and subtly impudent remarks against the Nazis, proving to be an early thorn in their side. Finck had an ability to be seemingly lost for words when saying something and the audience, playing along, finished his sentences. He often defied authority by daring Gestapo informers in the audience to write down every word he said. According to an anecdote, Finck once confronted an officer asking with seeming innocence, "Am I talking too fast? Can you follow me or shall I follow you?"

According to his later accounts, Finck was confronted with politics for the very first time: "If only I had known that all these people were just Mitläufer. Some even camouflaged as Gauleiter. (...) So quite a few people claim I had disapproved of the Nazis. I would like to point out that these are defamations. You never know. (...) I must admit though that the Nazis disapproved of me." The way Finck presented his jokes made it very difficult for authorities to nail him down. His exploits made him a legend in his lifetime, to such an extent that when he introduced himself to British and American journalists after the war, he was met with disbelief as they believed that the "Werner Finck" who joked against the Nazis was a fairy-tale figure.

However, the Katakombe was closed on 10 May 1935 on the orders of Minister Joseph Goebbels. Finck and his colleagues were interned for six weeks in Esterwegen concentration camp, where he met Carl von Ossietzky and Julius Leber. The Katakombe ensemble took their arrest in good stride, because they still performed despite their imprisonment. They reasoned that before the cabaret closed down they had performed with anxiety due to the fear of incarceration; now they did not need to fear because they were already imprisoned. It was due to the intervention of his friend, actress Käthe Dorsch, who talked to Goebbels' rival Hermann Göring, that Finck was released on 1 July on condition that he not work in public for a year.

Despite this he continued performing before live audiences from 1937 onwards, as well as in film, where he had a successful, if undistinguished, career from 1931. However, he was banned from the Reichskulturkammer in 1939 and, threatened with arrest again, he joined the Wehrmacht armed forces in the rank of a private radiotelephone operator to avoid imprisonment. A member of the 23rd Infantry Division, he was awarded the Iron Cross, 2nd class and the Eastern Front Medal, which he called "Frozen Meat Medal" (Gefrierfleischorden).

He temporarily served as a troop entertainer and later used his World War II exploits in a cabaret programme entitled Der brave Soldat schweigt ("The Good Soldier Shuts Up" – a pun on Jaroslav Hašek's The Good Soldier Švejk). He witnessed the German surrender as a POW of the U.S. Army in Bad Aibling, Bavaria.

From 1945 to 1949, Finck, with Hans Bayer ("Thaddäus Troll"), issued the journal Das Wespennest ("The Hornets' Nest"), the first German satirical magazine after the war. He resumed his career in cabaret, performing at the Schmunzelkolleg ("Chuckle College") in Munich and founding the Nebelhorn ("Foghorn") cabaret in Zürich (1947), as well as the Mausefalle ("Mousetrap") in Stuttgart (1948). In 1950 he established the joke political party of the "Radical Centre" in West Berlin. Finck was able to continue his film career, including the role for which he is most known today, in Fassbinder's TV series Eight Hours Don't Make a Day in 1972; he played Gregor, the doddering but gentle old lover of the miniseries protagonist's grandmother. He remained active in live performances, notably going on tour in the United States in 1968.

== Death ==
Finck died in Munich, aged 76, where he is buried in the Waldfriedhof cemetery. The inscription on his tombstone reads: "You are still here and I passed away, soon you are there where I am today."

== Honors ==
- Order of Merit of the Federal Republic of Germany (1973)
- Walk of Fame of Cabaret, Mainz (posthumous, 2004)

== Selected filmography ==
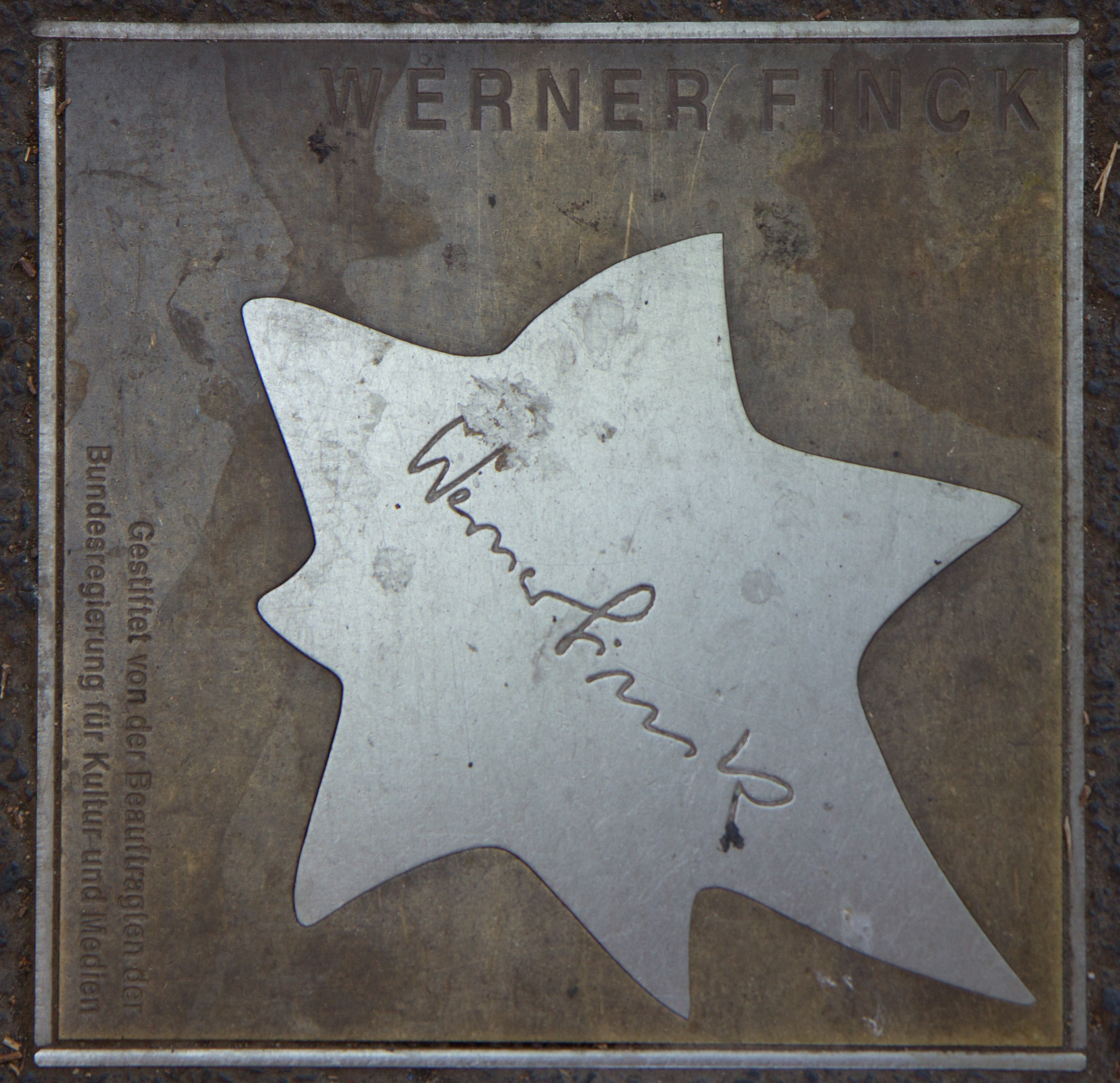
Walk of Fame

Werner Finck made many film and TV appearances in a career spanning about forty years, many of which are but brief appearances that showcased his talent:

- The Company's in Love (1932)
- The Hymn of Leuthen (1933)
- When the Village Music Plays on Sunday Nights (1933)
- Liebelei (1933)
- A Woman Who Knows What She Wants (1934)
- Holiday From Myself (1934)
- The Flower Girl from the Grand Hotel (1934)
- The Cousin from Nowhere (1934)
- What Am I Without You (1934)
- Love Conquers All (1934)
- Just Once a Great Lady (1934)
- The Girlfriend of a Big Man (1934)
- Fresh Wind from Canada (1935)
- The Vagabonds (1937)
- La Habanera (1937)
- The Unexcused Hour (1937)
- Autobus S (1937)
- The Grey Lady (1937)
- Faded Melody (1938)
- The Man Who Couldn't Say No (1938)
- The Girl of Last Night (1938)
- The Roundabouts of Handsome Karl (1938)
- Film Without a Title (1948), as Hubert
- My Niece Susanne (1950), as Dubouton
- It Began at Midnight (1951), as the Baron
- Not Without Gisela (1951), as himself
- Stärker als die Nacht (1954)
- Heroism after Hours (1955)
- Hanussen (1955), as Expert witness
- Lola Montès (1955), as Wisböck
- My Husband's Getting Married Today (1956), as Dr. Agartz
- The Zürich Engagement (1957), as Dr. Julius Wayer
- Victor and Victoria (1957), as Hinz
- Tired Theodore (1957), as Dr. Karl Findeisen
- Marriages Forbidden (1957), as Judge Dr. Kern
- The Twins from Zillertal (1957) as Herr Kleeman
- Father, Mother and Nine Children (1958)
- And That on Monday Morning (1959), as Professor Gross
- Labyrinth (1959), as President
- Roses for the Prosecutor (1959), as Haase
- The Last Pedestrian (1960), as Editor Hiss
- Storm in a Water Glass (1960)
- The White Horse Inn (1960), as Professor Hinzelmann
- What Is Father Doing in Italy? (1961), as Direktor Schlosser
- It Can't Always Be Caviar (1961) as Doctor Beck
- Love at Twenty (1962), as Surgeon
- Two Bavarians in Bonn (1962), as Minister
- Der Partyphotograph (1968), as Jacoby
- Quartett im Bett (1968), as Newspaper Publisher
- Hurra, die Schule brennt! (1969), as Under Secretary von Schnorr
- Eight Hours Don't Make a Day (1972, TV series), as Gregor

In the 1982 TV movie Inside the Third Reich, he was portrayed by American comedian Mort Sahl.
