= The Unexcused Hour =

The Unexcused Hour may refer to:

- The Unexcused Hour (1937 film), an Austrian comedy film
- The Unexcused Hour (1957 film), an Austrian-West German comedy film
