= Olaf Koch (conductor) =

German conductor

Olaf Koch (14 January 1932 – 22 August 2001) was a German conductor and Hochschullehrer.

In 1964, he was appointed general music director at the Meiningen Court Theatre. At the end of the 1960s, he turned to concert conducting, and for over twenty years he was the principal conductor of the Staatliches Sinfonieorchester and the Philharmonisches Staatsorchester Halle, which he led to national recognition. Koch championed Neue Musik works by East German (Günter Kochan among others) and Soviet composers. In 1979 he received the National Prize of the GDR.

Initially appointed Conducting Professor at Hochschule für Musik Franz Liszt, Weimar, he served as Rector of the Hochschule für Musik "Hanns Eisler" from 1982 to 1986.

== Life ==
=== Thuringian origin and socialisation ===
Born in Bebra near Sondershausen, Koch came from a working-class family. He was born in 1932 as the son of a Kaliwerk Bischofferode-Kumpel and grew up in Halle. He was also influenced by an antifascist milieu. Koch, who was himself a member of the Antifa youth, lost his brother Heinz Koch during the Nazi era, who was executed in Gedenkstätte Plötzensee in 1941 for high and national treason.

After attending elementary school, he studied violoncello, piano, composition and conducting at the Max Reger Conservatory in Sondershausen from 1945 to 1950. His livelihood He earned his living during this time as a forestry worker and dance musician. "Out of deep conviction", as Wolfgang Herbrand put it, he turned to the state party in the GDR. Although he had already applied for membership at the age of twenty-one, he did not become a member of the Socialist Unity Party of Germany until 1955. In terms of cultural policy, he identified with the idea that art no longer belonged only to the elite, but to ordinary people.

=== Changing Kapellmeister posts ===
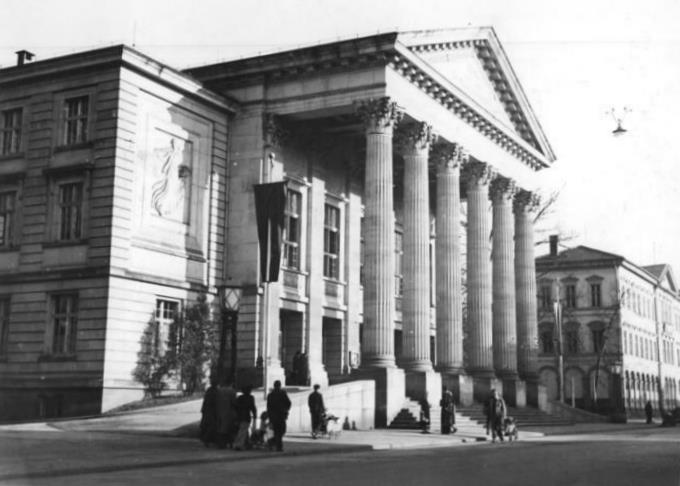
Meininger Theater (1953)

In 1950 Koch became Repetitor for ballet, opera and operetta and 2nd Kapellmeister in Meiningen, where he was from then on promoted by the theatre director Fritz Diez. The main focus of his activity was that of an operetta conductor. From 1955 to 1958 he was 1st Kapellmeister at the Opernhaus Halle. There, in 1958, he produced the ballet "Kreuzbauer Ulrike" by Carl-Heinz Dieckmann, choreographed by Henn Haas and set during the German Campaign of 1813 to the first performance. In 1958, he went to the Stralsund Theatre as musical director. From Halle, he brought his assistant director Harry Kupfer, who was now the only music theatre director to stage the following operas for him in Stralsund: Der Freischütz by Carl Maria von Weber, Enoch Arden by Ottmar Gerster and The Merry Wives of Windsor by Otto Nicolai. In 1960/61, he moved as music director to the Theater der Altmark in Stendal. In 1961, he realised with the Hungarian refugee Béla Hollai in the West German Göttingen, a joint project between the Göttinger Symphonie Orchester and Stendal with works by Josef Suk, Aram Khachaturian, Carl Maria von Weber and Robert Schumann.

=== General music director at the Meiningen Theatre ===
At the instigation of the GDR authorities and also at his own request, he returned to the Meiningen Theatre from November 1961 to 1967. This time he was engaged as musical director, in 1964 he was appointed general music director. For Alfred Erck, Koch was "endowed with absolute ear, loving the great tone, savouring dramatic moments very well, he duly declared war on inaccuracies, even sloppiness, and was feared by orchestra musicians and singers alike." The soloist ensemble at the time included, among others Günther Hofmann, Ines Kurz-Markgraf and Volker Schunke. A novelty was that he brought Eastern European bel canto soloists like Sandor Arizs and Virginia Keranowa to Meiningen from 1964. Accordingly, he initially had mainly Italian operas by Giuseppe Verdi and Giacomo Puccini performed. In 1962, Koch also took over the direction of the Rüdiger Flohr production of Handel's Ezio in the musical version by Max Schneider. His authoritarian style of leadership and dominance with regard to the soloists clashed in Meiningen with the innovations of director Hans Günter Nebel, who was influenced by Walter Felsenstein's musical theatre. The two came together in Russian musical drama, for example in Mussorgsky's Boris Godunov. In addition, Wagner and Strauss productions were also created. Koch's preference, however, was for symphonies, whereby he particularly appreciated Ludwig van Beethoven. Later, he also included the concert music of Slavic composers such as Modest Mussorgsky and Dmitri Shostakovich in his repertoire. In 1967, he realised the German premiere of the 1st Symphony by Nina Makarova, the wife of Aram Khachaturyan. Furthermore, on the occasion of the 1966 Thuringian Music Days, he premiered the Symphonic Poem for Two Pianos and Orchestra by Wolfgang Hohensee with the Berlin pianists Eberhard Rebling and Siegfried Stöckigt. According to Gert Richter, he led the Meiningen Court Orchestra "to a higher musical level". Koch himself regarded the time in Meiningen as the most formative of his career.

=== Chief conductor of the Halle Philharmonic Orchestra ===
Koch turned increasingly to concert conducting from 1967 and was succeeded by Karl-Ernst Sasse Head and chief conductor of the Philharmonisches Staatsorchester Halle. Koch "wanted to form an orchestra that should correspond to his high ideas", as journalist Gisela Heine put it. In Halle, he arranges the Handel Festival Halle and the Musiktage with. Thus, on the occasion of the 1970 Handel Festival, he conducted Beethoven's Tripelkonzert, which was interpreted by the Soviet guest musicians, violin virtuoso Oleg Kagan, pianist Elisabeth Leonskaja and cellist Natalia Gutman. At the Wittenberg "Weeks of Contemporary Music" in 1971, he participated with a performance of Leoš Janáček'sSinfonietta. Moreover, he premiered several contemporary musical works by GDR composers, among others in 1969 Heinz Röttgers Violin Concerto (with Gustav Schmahl) and in 1970 Hans Jürgen Wenzel's "Trassensinfonie". Wenzel's work, however, which had not been awarded by the Association of Composers and Musicologists of the GDR (VKM), led to conflict with Koch, whereupon from the 1970s onwards he initially deferred contemporary music and thus in effect sound creations from the region in the programme planning and from 1979 also in Wenzel's progressive Series "Confrontation" of the Halle Philharmonic. In 1972 Koch took over the direction of the Hallesche Philharmonie, which emerged from the former State Symphony Orchestra, the Robert Franz Singing Academy and the Stadtsingechor zu Halle; furthermore, a separate chamber orchestra, which he conducted from 1973 to 1984, and two wind groups were pronounced. According to the musicologist Konstanze Musketa, this resulted in "a versatile and powerful ensemble", from which "essential impulses for the musical life of the region" took their starting point. In 1976, he conducted the festive concert on the occasion of the inauguration of the Konzerthalle St.-Ulrich-Kirche, which was to replace the Steintor-Varieté as the main venue. Koch advocated a "democratisation of concert life", which was expressed in introductions to works and talks as well as concert planning. Thus, according to Richter, his Werkhalle and student concerts were an effort to "introduce those circles to classical music." The concerts were considered to be largely sold out. The ensemble's repertoire included symphonic music from the classical period to the modern. The choral-orchestral connection allowed repeated performances of oratorios by George Frideric Handel. For the 450th anniversary of the German Peasants' War, it premiered the oratorio "Die Antwort" by Wolfgang Hohensee with a text by Paul Wiens in the St. Mary's Church, Mühlhausen under Koch's direction. The merit of the symphony orchestra, the chamber orchestra and the chamber music ensembles for contemporary music should also be expressed in further premieres. However, composers from the Halle-Magdeburg area were hardly considered by the philharmonic. Due to his inactivity, Koch was also not re-elected as chairman of the performers' section (1972–1976) in the corresponding district association of the VKM. On the other hand, Koch "never chose according to affiliation to trends and fashions, but always with regard to their musical quality", as Richter elaborated. Moreover, the "effect of the sonic result" was important to Koch. Among the works presented were Alan Bushs 1972 symphonic movement for piano and orchestra "Africa" (with Alan Bush), 1974 Fritz Geißler's Symphony No. 8, 1975 Günter Kochans Viola Concerto (with Alfred Lipka), 1981 Wolfgang Stendel's Cello Concerto (with Hans-Joachim Scheitzbach) and in 1989 Kurt Schwaens 2nd Piano Concerto (with Ton Nu Nguyet Minh) and Dietrich Boekles new version of the Concerto for large orchestra. Regularly the orchestra was invited to the major alternating In 1989, he performed at the Dresdner Tage der zeitgenössischen Musik. Clearly visible under Koch's conducting was also an international recognition, as Musketa pointed out. Numerous guest performances took the orchestra to the so-called Eastern Bloc. Koch's "authority and negotiating skills", as stated in an obituary in the Mitteldeutsche Zeitung from Halle, also enabled the Philharmonie to make concert tours to the Non-Socialist Economic Area from 1975. According to the musicologist Achim Heidenreich, in addition to these regular events in the Federal Republic of Germany, which were quite positively noted, German Communist Party organised workers' concerts were also served, which, on the other hand, were not very well received. The dramaturge Gerd Richter perceived Koch in Halle "as an imaginative, outstanding artist and clever manager". He found impressive "his high musicality and his elegant, yet also precise, percussion technique, his ability to accurately assess the effect of a piece of music when reading the score, but also to be able to convey this to the performers as well as ultimately to the audience". Koch had a "tendency towards a certain theatricality", according to Richter, and possessed a "strong, at times egocentric, personality". Despite not having studied at a conservatoire, he was "open to all artistic and intellectual stimuli, indeed he had a pronounced thirst for knowledge" and was also concerned, for example, with the maxims of historical performance practice.

During his time in Halle, Koch helped GDR compositions to receive Soviet first performances in Moscow, such as the 1965 "Little Music for Orchestra" and the Violin Concerto (with Viktor Aleksandrovich Pikaisen by Ruth Zechlin and in 1971 the 2nd Symphony by Günter Kochan. In addition, he premiered Dumitru Bughici's symphonic Suite Pictures from the History of Romania with the Romanian Radio Symphony Orchestra in Bucharest in 1973. In 1984 he became a member of the "Kuratorium Schauspielhaus", chaired by Peter Schreier, and in 1985 of the GDR Committee on the 750 Jahre Berlin.

According to Hans-Martin Uhle, the choirmaster from Halle, Koch "led the orchestra into the Oberliega". He was "an excellent conductor and good orchestra educator". His obsession with power was to be regarded as not unproblematic, under which the then choirmaster of the Robert Franz Singing Academy "Hartmut Haenchen had to suffer increasingly". Koch had used his party membership to thwart Haenchen's artistic activities with the orchestra. As a consequence, Haenchen left Halle in 1972. Similarly, he did not maintain a good relationship with Haenchen's successor Wolfgang Unger.

Koch's tendential closeness to the state, which had been assessed as a "political vicious circle", led to his resignation in Halle at the end of 1989 after an uncomfortable voting result. In accordance with the request of the orchestra's board, he nevertheless continued his work until the end of the 1989/90 season, so that he could give his last concert in the Saale city with the final concert of the 39th Handel Festival. According to Gilbert Stöck, Koch "outwardly affirmed the cultural-political line of the state party with often pithy words". For the musicologist and Masur biographer Johannes Forner, he was considered a "political hardliner and problematic in human dealings". Nevertheless, Richter emphasised: His socio-political ideas did not exclude criticism of political realities Shortly before his death, he reported to Richter that he also saw himself cheated of his ideals by the rulers of the GDR.

=== End of career in Suhl ===
In 1990, Koch returned to his native Thuringia and became chief conductor and director of the Thüringen Philharmonie Gotha-Eisenach. With the new orchestra he gave guest performances at home and abroad. In 1993, he tried unsuccessfully to return to the Meiningen Theatre. In 1994/95, together with Jean-Paul Penin Principal Conductor and in 1995/96 Guest Conductor in Suhl.

Koch was also involved in orchestra building in Thessaloniki and Tokyo. Thus he received guest conductorships in Greece (1996) and China/Taiwan (1997).

== Teaching commitments ==
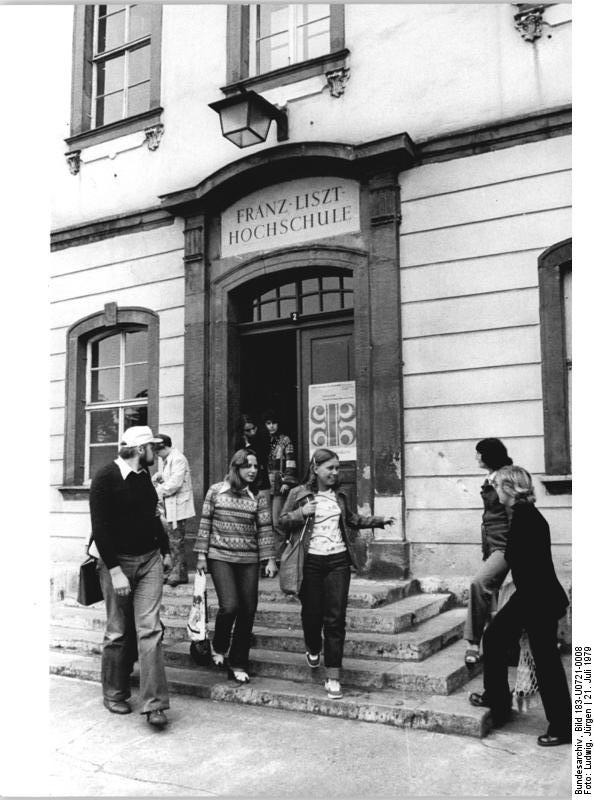
Hochschule für Musik Franz Liszt Weimar (1979)

Another focus of his work was orchestral education. In 1972 he began teaching at the University of Music and Theatre Leipzig, where he became chairman of the orchestra council in 1979. He was available to the University Symphony Orchestra as a guest conductor. In September In 1975, he received a professorship with a lectureship in conducting at the Hochschule für Musik Franz Liszt, Weimar, which he held again from 1987 to 1993.

From 1982 to September In 1986, he succeeded Dieter Zechlin Rector of the Hochschule für Musik "Hanns Eisler" Berlin. During this period in Halle, the personal union between the artistic and the state management of the orchestra had been abolished; Wolfgang Pfeiffer held the office of director of the Philharmonie. Koch was often represented by his deputy Karl-Heinz Zettel.

He was also a visiting professor in Tokyo, Havana and Pyongyang.

In Halle, Koch led a conducting seminar from the 1970s onwards that fell under the jurisdiction of the Ministry of Culture, which turned the orchestra into a kind of "practice orchestra", as well as seminars with composition students to study works. Koch was also a member of the Permanent Jury Conducting of the GDR, which was headed by Kurt Masur. In 1992, he led the course of the resulting Dirigentenforum of the Deutscher Musikrat in Suhl.

Among his students were Peter Aderhold, Christfried Göckeritz, Christian Rudolf Riedel and István Ella, but also female conductors like Dobrin Panajotow, Helga Sippel, Dorothea Köhler and Johanna Martens as well as Johanna Weitkamp. In Thessaloniki war Cosima Sophia Osthoff Assistantin Kochs.

== Personal life ==
Koch was married five times. From his marriage in 1954 to the actress and director Sieglinde Wiegand (1929–2018), he married director Stephanie Koch (born 1955). His third marriage was to the actress Monika Reh. For a time he was married to the violinist Kathinka Rebling (born 1941). Koch had a firearms licence and was considered a passionate hunter.

Koch died in 2001 in Halle at the age of 69. In 2006, a commemorative plaque was unveiled at his birthplace in Sondershausen-Bebra on the initiative of the Bebra Male Choir. Anlässlich des 100-jährigen Bestehens des Chores widmete man Koch das Lied Geboren aus der Kraft zum Leben.

== Awards ==
- 1964: Max Reger Prize des Bezirks Suhl
- 1973: Handel Prize
- 1974: Vaterländischer Verdienstorden in Gold
- 1975: Artur Becker Medal in Gold
- 1976: Handel Prize des Bezirks Halle (für die Hallesche Philharmonie)
- 1976: Kunstpreis der DDR
- 1979: Nationalpreis der DDR III. Klasse für Kunst und Literatur ("für seine Verdienste als Dirigent und Orchestererzieher")

Olaf Koch also won the Bela Bartok Medal, and an honorary award of the Soviet Union of Composers for the interpretation of commissioned works.

== Recordings ==
- Günter Kochan: Violakonzert (NOVA, 1976) – Hallesche Philharmonie, Alfred Lipka (Viola)
- Bert Poulheim: Fagottkonzert (NOVA, 1982) – Hallesche Philharmonie, Bert Poulheim (Fagott)
- Kurt Schwaen: Requiem für Orchester (NOVA, 1988) – Orchester der Hochschule für Musik „Hanns Eisler“ Berlin
- Peter Jona Korn: Beckmesser-Variationen / Symphonie Nr. 3 / Exorzismus eines Liszt-Fragments (Thorofon, 1992) – Thüringen Philharmonie Gotha
- Dietrich Erdmann: Musica multicolore / Concertino für Klavier und kleines Orchester (Thorofon, 1992) – Thüringen-Philharmonie Suhl, Roswitha Lohmer (piano)
- Ulrich Sommerlatte: Sinfonische Unterhaltung etc. (Koch-Schwann, 1993) – Thüringen-Philharmonie Suhl
- Joseph Suder: II. Symphonische Musik (CALIG, 1993) – Thüringen-Philharmonie Suhl
- Wolfgang Stendel: Inventionen für Orchester (Thorofon, 1994) – Thüringen-Philharmonie Suhl
- Nina Makarova: Symphony in D Minor (Russian Disc, 1994) – State Academic Symphony Orchestra of the Russian Federation
- Gerhard Rosenfeld: Flötenkonzert (Hastedt, 1997) – Kammerorchester der Halleschen Philharmonie, Otto Rühlemann (flute)
- Alexandre Guilmant, Léon Boëllmann, François-Joseph Fétis: Masterworks for Organ & Orchestra (Guild, 2001) – Ingolstadt Philharmonie, Franz Hauk (organ)

Cultural offices
Preceded by Karl-Ernst Sasse	Music Director, Staatsorchester Halle; 1967–1990	Succeeded by Heribert Beissel
