= Napoleon Is to Blame for Everything =

1938 film

- Directed by: Curt Goetz
- Written by: Karl Peter Gillmann; Curt Goetz
- Produced by: Gerhard Staab
- Starring: Curt Goetz; Valerie von Martens; Paul Henckels
- Cinematography: Friedl Behn-Grund
- Edited by: René Métain
- Music by: Franz Grothe
- Production company: Tobis Film
- Distributed by: Tobis Film
- Release date: 29 November 1938
- Running time: 93 minutes
- Country: Germany
- Language: German

Napoleon Is to Blame for Everything (German: Napoleon ist an allem schuld) is a 1938 German comedy film directed by Curt Goetz and starring Goetz, Valerie von Martens and Paul Henckels. It marked the German debut of the Norwegian-born star Kirsten Heiberg. It was shot at the Johannisthal Studios in Berlin. The film's sets were designed by the art director Emil Hasler. When Goetz and his wife subsequently emigrated from Nazi Germany, the film was banned by Joseph Goebbels.

== Synopsis ==
Lord Cavershott is a fanatical admirer of Napoleon to the extent that he neglects his own wife Josephine. While attending a conference in Paris to commemorate the French Emperor, he becomes mixed up with an attractive young singer, leading to complications and much confusion.

== Cast ==
- Curt Goetz as Lord Arthur Cavershott
- Valerie von Martens as Lady Josephine Cavershott
- Paul Henckels as Lord Cunningham
- Else von Möllendorff as Pünktchen (Madeleine)
- Kirsten Heiberg as Fifi
- Max Gülstorff as Professor Meunier
- Willi Schur as Rustan
- Maria Krahn as Madge, Kammerzofe
- Leopold von Ledebur as Butler William
- Hans Mierendorff as Revue-Dichter
- Rudolf Schündler as Rundfunkreporter
- Eduard von Winterstein as Mister Harrison
- Jack Trevor as Minister
- Olga Limburg as Madame Prunelle
- Hermann Pfeiffer as Revue-Napoleon
- Horst Birr as Junger reporter in paris
- Eberhard Leithoff as Regisseur Cukier
- Edmond Leslie as Tänzer
- Christel Schmitz as Tänzerin
- Walter Gross as Reiseführer im Autobus
- Charly Berger as Assistant Kriminalbeamter
- Egon Brosig as Teilnehmer am Napoleon Kongress
- Peter Busse as Mitglied des Empfangskomitee
- Angelo Ferrari as Mitglied des Empfangskomitee
- Lothar Glathe as Diener
- Fred Goebel as Kriminalbeamter
- Willy Kaiser-Heyl as Teilnehmer am Napoleon Kongress
- Alfred Karen as Mitglied des Empfangskomitee
- Seraj Munir as Teilnehmer am Napoleon Kongress
- Karl Platen as Angestellter im Pariser Theater
- Werner Schott as Teilnehmer am Napoleon Kongress
- Leo Sloma as Wirt
- Otto Stoeckel as Teilnehmer am Napoleon Kongress
- Eugen von Bongardt as Teilnehmer am Napoleon Kongress

== Bibliography ==
- Kreimeier, Klaus (1999). The Ufa Story: A History of Germany's Greatest Film Company, 1918–1945. University of California Press. ISBN 978-0-520-22069-0.
