= Bert Poulheim =

German composer

Bert Poulheim (1952–2006) was a German composer.

== Life ==
Poulheim was a student of Ruth Zechlin. In 1977, his work Die Uraufführung was premiered at the Club der Kulturschaffenden in Berlin. In 1979, he was awarded the Hanns Eisler Prize. In 1987, the premiere of the musical comedy Zug um Zug (text Hansjörg Schneider) took place at the Zeitz Theatre.

In 2007, the Bert Poulheim & Marion Violet Foundation was established.

== Work ==
- Symphony No. 1 (1978)
- Concerto for Bassoon and Orchestra (1979)
- Virtuoses for viola and piano (1977)
- Zeitspiele for solo flute (1982)
- Capriccio for bassoon and piano (1995)
- Impressions for bassoon and piano
- No wind music, but music for five winds for wind quintet (1983)
- Turkish Fantasy for four trombones and tuba (1987)
- Four Miniatures for three trombones (1980)
- Facets for piano
- Am Samovar for voice and guitar
- Songs of a Year on texts from ancient Japanese poetry for mezzo-soprano and piano (1980)
- The Silent Carousel on texts by Marion Violet for mezzo-soprano and piano

== Recordings ==
- 1978: Virtuoses für Viola und Klavier (Nova) with Alfred Lipka and Dieter Brauer
- 1982: Fagottkonzert (Nova) with the Halleschen Philharmonie directed by Olaf Koch
- 2000: Swinging Trombones (Koch-Schwann) with the Berlin Trombone Quintet
- 2002: Das Stumme Karussell (Kreuzberg Records) with Marion Violet and the Ensemble Capriccio Nova
