= The Revenge of Count Silvain =

1920 film

- Directed by: Willy Grunwald
- Starring: Asta Nielsen
- Cinematography: Max Lutze
- Production company: Cserépy-Film
- Release date: 5 March 1920
- Country: Germany
- Languages: Silent; German intertitles

The Revenge of Count Silvain (German:Graf Sylvains Rache) is a 1920 German silent comedy film directed by Willy Grunwald and starring Asta Nielsen.

== Cast ==
- Curt Goetz as Graf Sylvain
- Asta Nielsen as Madelaine
- Ernst Hofmann as Vicomte Emile
- Karl Platen as Kammerdiener Jean
- Mathilde Wieder as Kammerzofe Lucie

== Bibliography ==
- Lloyd, Ann. Movies of the Silent Years. Orbis, 1984.
