= Franz Grothe =

German composer

Franz Grothe (17 September 1908 – 12 September 1982) was a German composer, arranger, songwriter, conductor, and pianist active from the mid 1920s until his death in 1982 at the age of 73. He was a prolific composer for German cinema, and was a writer of popular songs. He was particularly known for his output of successful musical films. While principally a composer for the screen, he also wrote some musicals and operettas for the stage. Historian Robert Letellier stated that "Grothe was among the most popular German composers and conductors of the 20th century."

Grothe was required to be a member of the Nazi Party (No. 2.580.427), but flouted the party's ban on jazz music by continuing to compose in a swing style. During World War II he served as Werner Egk's deputy while Egk was in charge of the composer division of the Reichsmusikkammer. After the war he had a major success with the musical film The Spessart Inn (1958). In his later career he composed for German television and spent the last ten years of his life as chairman of the board of GEMA. He was the recipient of several awards, among them the Paul-Lincke-Ring (1966), the Filmband in Gold (1975), and the Max Reger Prize (1978).

== Life and career ==
Franz Grothe was born in Berlin on 17 September 1908. He was trained as a pianist and composer at the Hochschule für Musik Hanns Eisler Berlin, and began working in Dajos Béla's band at the age of 18. In his early career he wrote lighter popular songs and worked as an arranger for Robert Stolz, Franz Lehár, and Emmerich Kálmán. During the Great Depression he penned a number of escapist optimistic tunes of a lively nature.

With the rise of sound film, Grothe oriented his career into composing for the cinema. He composed the music to a total of 167 films from 1929 through 1967. Several of his films were operettas or musicals; many of which were created with lyricist Willy Dehmel whom was his most frequent collaborator. He also worked on films with Fritz Rotter, Robert Gilbert, and Karl Wilczynski among others. He wrote several songs that became popular hits in German speaking countries, and was particularly known for his dance music and love songs. Many of these were recorded and performed on the radio by popular German entertainers.

In 1935 Grothe's stage musical Vier unter einem Dach premiered. This was followed by the operettas Die unsterbliche Sehnsucht (1937) and Die Nacht mit Casanova (1942). He did not write another stage work until the 1970s; producing the musicals Moral (1974) and Das Wirtshaus im Spessart (1977). When jazz was officially banned in Nazi Germany in 1935, Grothe ignored it and continued to write music using a swing style. However, Grothe officially joined the Nazi party and was appointed Werner Egk's deputy while Egk was the leader of the Composer division ("Leiter der Fachschaft Komponisten") in the State-Approved Society for the Exploitation of Musical Performing Rights (German: Staatlich genehmigte Gesellschaft zur Verwertung musikalischer Aufführungsrechte; STAGMA) which was then under the control of the Nazi Reichsmusikkammer (Reich Music Chamber).

With Georg Haentzschel, Grothe co-founded the German Dance and Entertainment Orchestra in 1941. He had a major success with the satirical musical film The Spessart Inn (1958). He also composed music for German television in the 1960s and 1970s. He was the recipient of the Paul-Lincke-Ring (1966), the Filmband in Gold (1975), and the Max Reger Prize (1978). He served as chairman of the board of GEMA from 1972 until his death in Cologne on 12 September 1982.

== Selected filmography ==
- The Night Belongs to Us (1929)
- The Last Company (1930)
- Boycott (1930)
- Love Songs (1930)
- The Big Attraction (1931)
- The Secret of the Red Cat (1931)
- Ronny (1931)
- The Unfaithful Eckehart (1931)
- The House of Dora Green (1933)
- And Who Is Kissing Me? (1933)
- The Girl with the Bruise (1933)
- The Castle in the South (1933)
- Tell Me Who You Are (1933)
- Dream Castle (1933)
- The Gentleman from Maxim's (1933)
- Waltz War (1933)
- The Big Bluff (1933)
- Heinz in the Moon (1934)
- Between Two Hearts (1934)
- So Ended a Great Love (1934)
- Miss Madame (1934)
- Peter, Paul and Nanette (1935)
- Winter Night's Dream (1935)
- The Blonde Carmen (1935)
- The Valley of Love (1935)
- A Woman Between Two Worlds (1936)
- The Love of the Maharaja (1936)
- The Merry Wives (1936)
- The Castle in Flanders (1936)
- Red Orchids (1938)
- Napoleon Is to Blame for Everything (1938)
- Secret Code LB 17 (1938)
- The Secret Lie (1938)
- Alarm at Station III (1939)
- Marriage in Small Doses (1939)
- The Curtain Falls (1939)
- Der singende Tor (1939)
- Roses in Tyrol (1940)
- Women Are Better Diplomats (1941)
- The Swedish Nightingale (1941)
- Love Me (1942)
- I Entrust My Wife to You (1943)
- The Eternal Tone (1943)
- A Waltz with You (1943)
- Love Premiere (1943)
- Don't Play with Love (1949)
- Nothing But Coincidence (1949)
- Derby (1949)
- Unknown Sender (1950)
- Taxi-Kitty (1950)
- Beloved Liar (1950)
- Harbour Melody (1950)
- Furioso (1950)
- Doctor Praetorius (1950)
- Chased by the Devil (1950)
- The Beautiful Galatea (1950)
- The House in Montevideo (1951)
- Fanfares of Love (1951)
- The Blue Star of the South (1951)
- Father Needs a Wife (1952)
- Must We Get Divorced? (1953)
- Hocuspocus (1953)
- Stars Over Colombo (1953)
- Fanfare of Marriage (1953)
- Scandal at the Girls' School (1953)
- They Call It Love (1953)
- The Blue Hour (1953)
- Ave Maria (1953)
- A Parisian in Rome (1954)
- Portrait of an Unknown Woman (1954)
- I Often Think of Piroschka (1955)
- Roses in Autumn (1955)
- The Blue Danube (1955)
- A Girl Without Boundaries (1955)
- Three Girls from the Rhine (1955)
- The Golden Bridge (1956)
- If We All Were Angels (1956)
- Queen Louise (1957)
- The Saint and Her Fool (1957)
- Goodbye, Franziska (1957)
- A Piece of Heaven (1957)
- Salzburg Stories (1957)
- Wir Wunderkinder (1958)
- The Trapp Family in America (1958)
- The Priest and the Girl (1958)
- The Man Who Walked Through the Wall (1959)
- Rendezvous in Vienna (1959)
- The Angel Who Pawned Her Harp (1959)
- Old Heidelberg (1959)
- Twelve Girls and One Man (1959)
- Jacqueline (1959)
- The Last Pedestrian (1960)
- Stage Fright (1960)
- Sweetheart of the Gods (1960)
- Two Among Millions (1961)
- The House in Montevideo (1963)
- My Daughter and I (1963)
- A Mission for Mr. Dodd (1964)
- Praetorius (1965)
- Liselotte of the Palatinate (1966)
