= The House in Montevideo (1963 film) =

1963 film directed by Helmut Käutner

- Directed by: Helmut Käutner
- Written by: Helmut Käutner
- Based on: The House in Montevideo by Curt Goetz
- Produced by: Hans Domnick
- Starring: Heinz Rühmann; Ruth Leuwerik; Paul Dahlke; Hanne Wieder
- Cinematography: Günther Anders
- Edited by: Klaus Dudenhöfer
- Music by: Franz Grothe
- Production company: Domnick Filmproduktion
- Distributed by: Constantin Film
- Release date: 17 October 1963
- Running time: 123 minutes
- Country: West Germany
- Language: German

The House in Montevideo (German: Das Haus in Montevideo) is a 1963 German comedy film directed by Helmut Käutner and starring Heinz Rühmann, Ruth Leuwerik and Paul Dahlke. It was shot at the Bavaria Studios in Munich. The film's sets were designed by the art directors Isabella Schlichting and Werner Schlichting. The film was based on the 1945 play The House in Montevideo by Curt Goetz, which had previously been turned into a film in 1951.

== Plot ==
Professor Traugott Nägler, a man with high moral standards, once repudiated his underage sister for having a baby out of wedlock. Many years later, having a loving wife and twelve children with only the small salary of a schoolmaster, he learns that said sister has died in South America, and that he should come with his oldest yet still underage daughter, Atlanta, who was named after the ship on which the couple was married at sea by the captain. In Uruguay, they find out that the sister had made a fortune and owned a house in Montevideo, an etablissement with several young ladies, that Atlanta inherits some money as marriage portion, and that a large amount of money could be inherited by the first underage female member in his house that behaves in the same disreputable way as the sister once did involuntarily. Not daring to tell his daughter Atlanta about the stipulation, and definitely not her younger sisters, he is anyway tempted to make helpful suggestions to her, and especially to her suitor who had followed them secretly. When the young couple wants to have their wedding on the same ship as her parents, they find out that size matters, and that Prof. Nägler has led a far more immoral life than his sister ever did.

== Cast ==
- Heinz Rühmann as Prof. Dr. Traugott Hermann Nägler
- Ruth Leuwerik as Marianne Nägler
- Paul Dahlke as Pastor Riesling
- Hanne Wieder as Carmen de la Rocco
- Ilse Pagé as Atlanta
- Michael Verhoeven as Herbert
- Viktor de Kowa as Anwalt
- Fritz Tillmann as Bürgermeister
- Elfie Fiegert as Belinda
- Doris Kiesow as Martha
- Herbert Kroll as Apotheker
- Georg Gütlich as Oberst
- Pierre Franckh as Lohengrin

== Bibliography ==
- Goble, Alan. The Complete Index to Literary Sources in Film. Walter de Gruyter, 1999.
