= Max Reger Prize =

East-German cultural prize

The Max Reger Art Prize was an art prize of the Bezirk Suhl in the German Democratic Republic. It was awarded annually on 7 October on the occasion of Tag der Republik to personalities from the fields of science and art in the district of Suhl. The prize was named after the composer and conductor Max Reger, who lived in the former residential town of Meiningen from 1911 to 1915 and conducted the Meiningen Court Orchestra there until 1914. This humanistic tradition of the town of Meiningen expired with the German Reunification Treaty in 1990.

The award ceremony used to take place in the Marble Hall of the Elisabethenburg Palace in Meiningen. Among others, the Max Reger Chamber Music Ensemble was engaged for the ceremony. The prize was endowed with 3000 marks of the GDR and consisted of a bronze medal in a leather case as well as a representative leather folder with a certificate. The prize had different classes, including the classes "Literature" and "Theatre".

== Laureates ==
- Konrad Mann (conductor, pianist) 1962
- Walter Werner (writer) 1962.
- Olaf Koch (conductor) (conductor) 1964
- Werner Schwarz (painter, graphic artist) 1965.
- Wolfgang Hocke (conductor) 1967
- Curt Letsche (writer) 1969
- Fritz Kühn (art smith, sculptor) 1970
- Kurt Baumgarten (painter) 1971
- Günther Hofmann (opera singer and director) for theatre 1975
- Chris Hornbogen (man of letters) 1977.
- Meininger Chorgemeinschaft
- Franz Grothe (composer) 1978
- Horst Jäger (author) for Literature 1979
- Joachim Knappe (writer) 1979
- Chamber Orchestra of the Technische Universität Ilmenau 1979
- Landolf Scherzer (writer) 1980
- Suhler Knabenchor 1985
- Peter Ehrlicher (singer) 1988
- Neuhaus am Rennsteig folk ensemble 1989
- Choir Community Krayenberg

The Max Reger Art Prize is not to be confused with the Main-Franconian Art Prize as a Nazi honour, which was also called the Max Reger Prize.
