= Thaddäus Troll =

German journalist, writer and poet

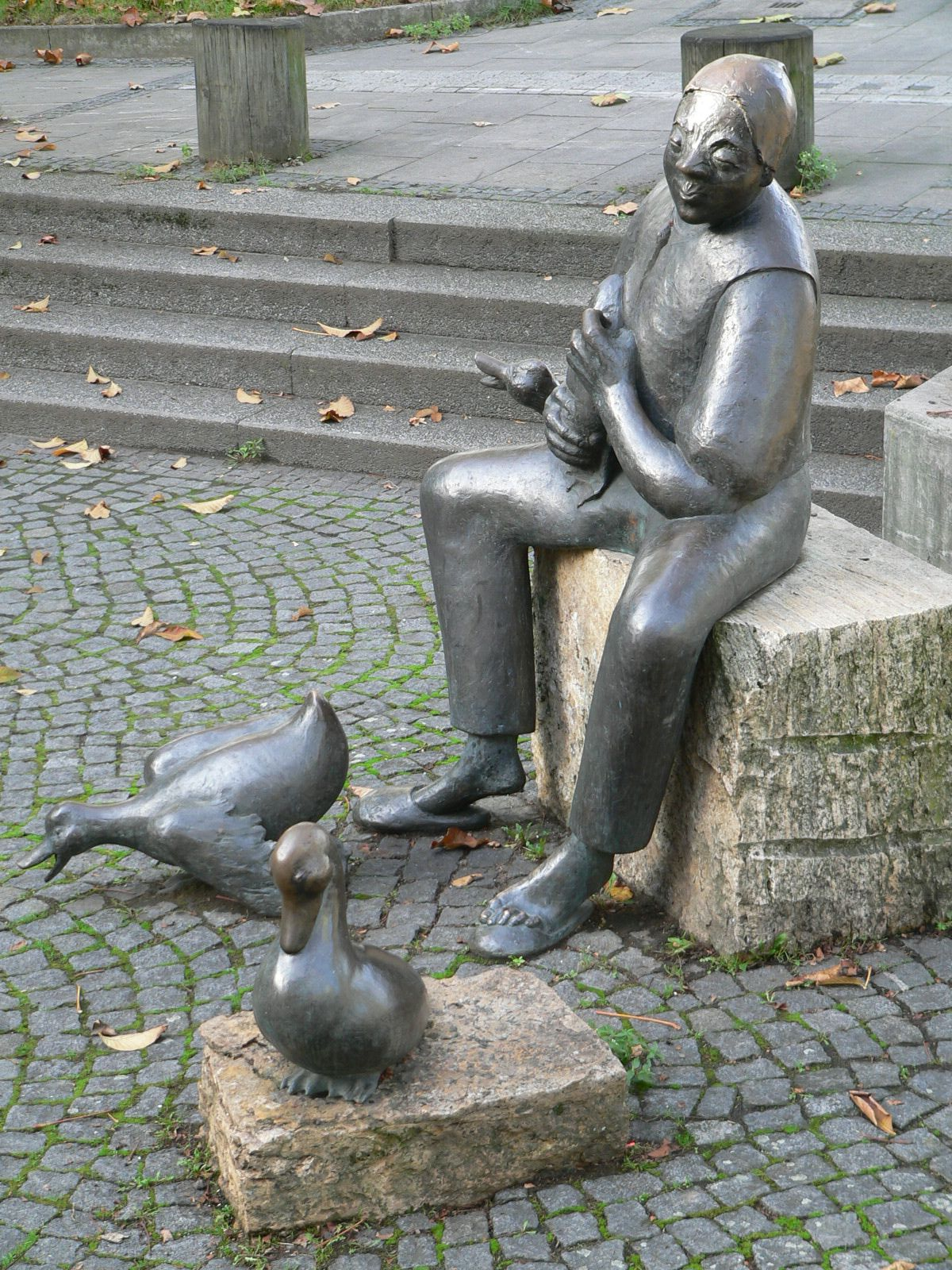
Monument to Thaddäus Troll in Bad Cannstatt. The sculpture depicts the protagonist of Troll's 1976 play Der Entaklemmer

Hans Bayer, known by the pseudonym Thaddäus Troll, (18 March 1914 – 5 July 1980) was a German journalist and writer and one of the most prominent modern poets in the Swabian German dialect. In his later years, he was also an active campaigner for libraries and for support, pension rights, and fair publishing contracts for writers. He was born in Cannstatt, a suburb of Stuttgart, and died by suicide there at the age of 66. The literary award Thaddäus-Troll-Preis is named in his honour.

== Life and career ==
Thaddäus Troll was born Hans Bayer in Cannstatt, a suburb of Stuttgart. His family had a soap-making business in the town. After he finished his secondary education at the Johannes-Kepler-Gymnasium, he worked briefly as a volunteer at a newspaper in Cannstatt. He then studied German, art history, comparative literature, theater, and journalism at the universities of Tübingen, Munich, Halle, and Leipzig, receiving his doctorate in 1938 from Leipzig University.

Bayer served as a reserve lieutenant in the German army, the Wehrmacht, from 1938. Following the outbreak of the Second World War, in the autumn of 1939, he applied to, and eventually, in the autumn of 1940, was accepted into the army's propaganda troops, the PK (Propagandakompanien), which were under the command of the Wehrmachtpropaganda department of the Oberkommando der Wehrmacht (the army's supreme command), and politically controlled by the Reichs Ministry of Public Enlightenment and Propaganda. At their peak the PK comprised some 30 companies and 15,000 soldiers with backgrounds as journalists, photographers, artists, and film and radio personnel, who were charged with the task of recording their experiences and observations on the front in a form suitable for dissemination in the Nazi-controlled media.

After a three-month training period, in Potsdam, Bayer served as a PK reporter from 1941 to 1945. He was stationed at first in Poland, in January 1941, and in June his unit moved to the Soviet Union, on the Eastern Front. A report he wrote on the Warsaw Ghetto, which he visited a number of times, was used as the text for a photo essay published in the Berliner Illustrierte Zeitung. Much of his work was published in military newspapers, including reports from the Soviet Union about the daily life of the German soldiers, and the impoverished condition of the Russian population. He also wrote feature articles, including humorous and satirical pieces. After a sojourn in southern Germany and Berlin from the end of 1942 to August 1943, he was assigned to a different PK unit and served as editor of the army newspaper Der Sieg (The Victory) through its closure in early 1945, part of the time while based in Warsaw.

In his postwar life, Bayer avoided reference to his career as a PK war correspondent; decades later he stated obliquely that he looked back "with deep shame" on what he had seen and experienced in the war.

Bayer spent the end of the war in an English prisoner-of-war camp in Putlos, in the vicinity of Oldenburg in Holstein, in spring to summer 1945, and while there directed the camp's theatre. Later that year, he married the journalist Elfriede Berger. The couple had one daughter but divorced a few years later. He then married another journalist, Susanne Ulrici Bayer, and had two more daughters.

After the war, Bayer worked as a journalist and co-founded with comedian Werner Finck, Das Wespennest (The Wasp's Nest), Germany's first post-war satirical magazine. (The magazine ceased publication in 1949.) Bayer was a correspondent for Der Spiegel from 1947 to 1951, but during that time he also began a career as a free-lance writer. He adopted the pseudonym "Thaddäus Troll" in 1948, the name under which he is primarily known and chosen because he wanted his books to be on library shelves near those of his role model Kurt Tucholsky.

In the ensuing years he published prolifically—poems, plays, novels, short-stories, theatre criticism, and satirical essays—often written in Swabian dialect. He also wrote scripts for the Düsseldorf cabaret Kom(m)ödchen, articles on wine and cookery, and a sex education book in Swabian on the model of Peter Mayle's Where Did I Come From?. His poetry was based on everyday life but had a political dimension in common with many post-war German poets. According to Wolfgang Beutin writing in A History of German Literature, Troll's playful linguistic use of dialect was simultaneously a "confrontation with social convention and a criticism of social rigidity," a trait akin to concrete poetry and one which he shared with the Franconian dialect poet Fitzgerald Kusz.

Although he was a supporter of the Social Democrat politicians Gustav Heinemann and Willy Brandt, Troll's approach to politics was essentially non-partisan and, like his poetry, was often playful. In 1950 he became one of the founding members of Werner Finck's Radikale Mitte (Radical Middle) party. Describing themselves as an "Association for Combating the Deadly Seriousness of the Time" and a "Parody Party", they were in favour of radicalism but opposed to extremism of both the Left and the Right. The party's symbol was a safety pin. In his later years Troll was an active campaigner for libraries and for support, pension rights, and fair publishing contracts for authors. He was one of the founders of the Förderkreis deutscher Schriftsteller, an organization that supports and sponsors writers in the German state of Baden-Württemberg, and served as its first chairman from 1968 to 1977. He also served on the executive councils and committees of Verband deutscher Schriftsteller (General Association of German Writers) and Süddeutschen Rundfunk (South German Radio). In 1978 he was elected vice-president of the German branch of PEN International.

After a lengthy and severe depression, Thaddäus Troll committed suicide in his Stuttgart apartment with an overdose of sleeping pills on 5 July 1980. He was 66 years old and had planned his own funeral before his death. At his wake the mourners were served his favourite dumplings and Trollinger wine. A Dixieland band accompanied him to his grave in the Steigfriedhof cemetery in Bad-Cannstatt. He specified no lengthy graveside sermons, only the Lord's Prayer and a reading of his self-written obituary. In the year following his death, the Förderkreis deutscher Schriftsteller established a literary award in his honour, the Thaddäus-Troll-Preis. That same year, Hoffmann & Campe published a posthumous anthology of his writings, Das große Thaddäus Troll-Lesebuch, which included Troll's self-written obituary.

== Selected works ==
- Sehnsucht nach Nebudistan (1956), comic novel. Kindler Verlag
- Hilfe, die Eltern kommen! (1956), novel (revised version published 1964). Sanssouci
- Deutschland deine Schwaben (1967). Hoffmann & Campe
- Preisend mit viel schönen Reden – Deutschland deine Schwaben für Fortgeschrittene (1972). Hoffmann & Campe
- Wo komm’ ich eigentlich her? (1974), children's book based on Peter Mayle's Where Did I Come From? The Facts of Life without Any Nonsense. Hoffmann & Campe
- O Heimatland (1976), poetry in Swabian dialect. Hoffmann & Campe
- Der Entaklemmer (1976), adaptation of Molière's play The Miser. Hoffmann & Campe
- Deutschland deine Schwaben im neuen Anzügle (1978). Hoffmann & Campe
- Das große Thaddäus Troll-Lesebuch (1981), posthumous anthology of Troll's writings. Hoffmann & Campe
- Thaddäus Trolls schwäbische Schimpfwörterei (1987), posthumous collection of Troll's Swabian anecdotes and swear-words. Silberburg-Verlag

== Studies ==
- Bischoff, Jörg (2013). Thaddäus Troll: Eine schwäbische Seele. Tübingen: Silberburg-Verlag. ISBN 978-3-8425-1268-9.
