= Curt Goetz =

German actor and writer (1888–1960)

- Born: Kurt Walter Götz; 17 November 1888; Mainz, German Empire
- Died: 12 September 1960 (aged 71); Grabs, Switzerland
- Occupations: Actor, director, writer

Curt Goetz (German: [kʊʁt ɡœt͡s]; 17 November 1888 – 12 September 1960), born Kurt Walter Götz, was a Swiss German writer, actor and film director. He was regarded as one of the most brilliant German comedy writers of his time. With his wife Valérie von Martens, he acted in his own plays and also filmed them. He was a distant relative of Irish writer George Bernard Shaw, to whom he was often compared.

== Life and work ==
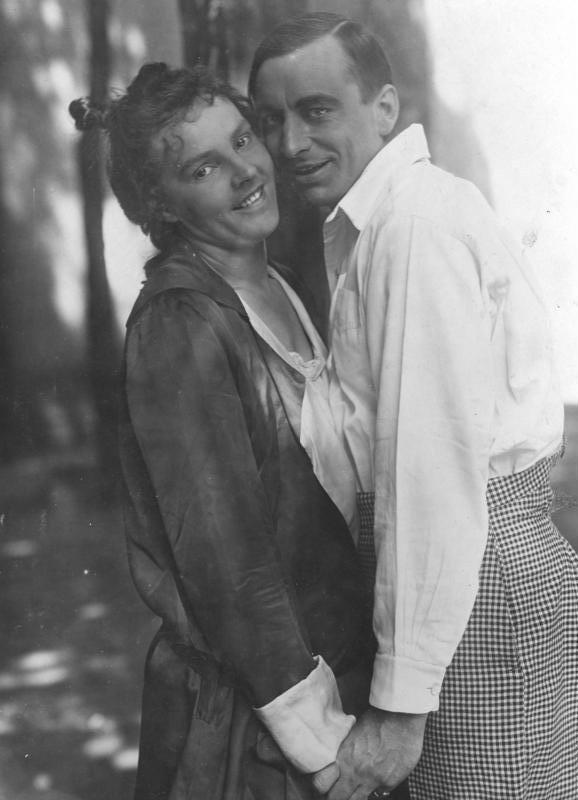
Curt Goetz with Leopoldine Konstantin (1917)

Goetz was born in Mainz, Germany the son of Swiss wine examiner Bernhard Götz and his German wife of Italian-French descent, Selma (born Rocco). His father died in 1890. Two-year-old Curt and his mother then moved to Halle, Saxony-Anhalt, where she managed a private clinic.

In 1906 Goetz graduated from City High School in Halle, where he played Franz Moor in The Robbers by Schiller.

His mother remarried, and his stepfather encouraged and financed Goetz's first steps in the theatre. He studied acting under Berlin's Emanuel Reicher. In 1907 he made his stage debut at the Stadttheater in Rostock, and wrote his first sketches for the stage. He played at theatres in Nuremberg, then went to Berlin. In 1912 he played the lead in the silent movie Black Blood, directed by Harry Piel.

In 1914 he married Erna Nitter; they divorced in 1917. He continued acting in silent movies, mainly comedies such as Ich möchte kein Mann sein (I Don't Want To Be A Man, 1918), directed by Ernst Lubitsch. One of his colleagues from that time was actor Max Landa.

In 1923 he married Valérie von Martens in Berlin, whom he met while acting in Vienna, and they toured together, acting in his own productions.

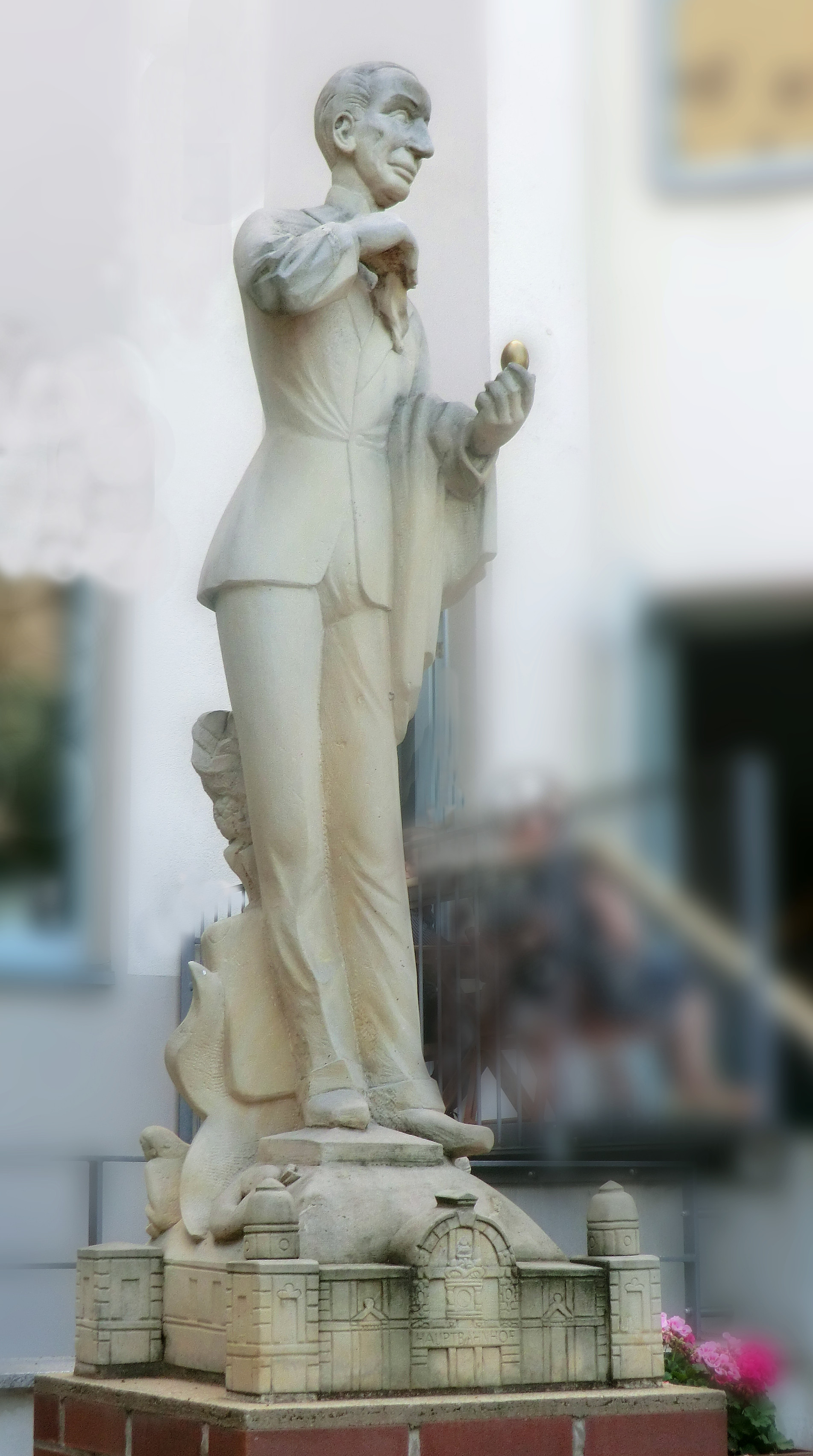
Statue of Curt Goetz in Halle, by Michael Weihe

In 1939 he went to Hollywood to study filmmaking, and decided to remain there, with Valérie, when war broke out. He worked with director Reinhold Schunzel and others, and several of his comedies become films. He was signed by MGM and worked on a number of film scripts. He and Valérie bought a farm in Van Nuys, California, where they successfully bred chickens.

In California, Goetz drafted his tale Tatjana and a new version of his Hokuspokus. He also reworked an older play into The House in Montevideo, which he successfully produced in Broadway's Playhouse Theatre in 1945.

The Goetzes returned to Europe in 1945, living in Switzerland by Lake Thun (Goetz had Swiss nationality from birth), where he wrote some successful novels. They later moved to Liechtenstein.

Goetz died in Grabs, St. Gallen, on 12 September 1960.

== Works (originally published in German) ==
=== Plays ===
- Der Lampenschirm (1911)
- Nachtbeleuchtung (1918, v. 1919) 5 Einakter: Nachtbeleuchtung, Lohengrin, Tobby, Minna Magdalena, Der fliegende Geheimrat
- Menagerie (1919) 4 Einakter: Der Spatz vom Dache, Die Taube in der Hand, Der Hund im Hirn, Der Hahn im Korb
- Ingeborg (1922)
- Die tote Tante und andere Begebenheiten (1924) 3 Einakter: Der Mörder, Das Märchen, Die tote Tante
- Hokuspokus (Original) (1926)
- Der Lügner und die Nonne (1928)
- Frauenarzt Dr. med. Hiob Prätorius (Original) (1934)
- Das Haus in Montevideo (1945)
- Hokuspokus (Neufassung) (1953)
- Dr. med. Hiob Prätorius (Neufassung) (1953)
- Nichts Neues in Hollywood (1956)
- Miniaturen (1958) 3 Einakter: Die Rache, Herbst, Die Kommode
- Seifenblasen (1962) 3 Einakter: Ausbruch des Weltfriedens, Die Bacarole, Die Bärengeschichte

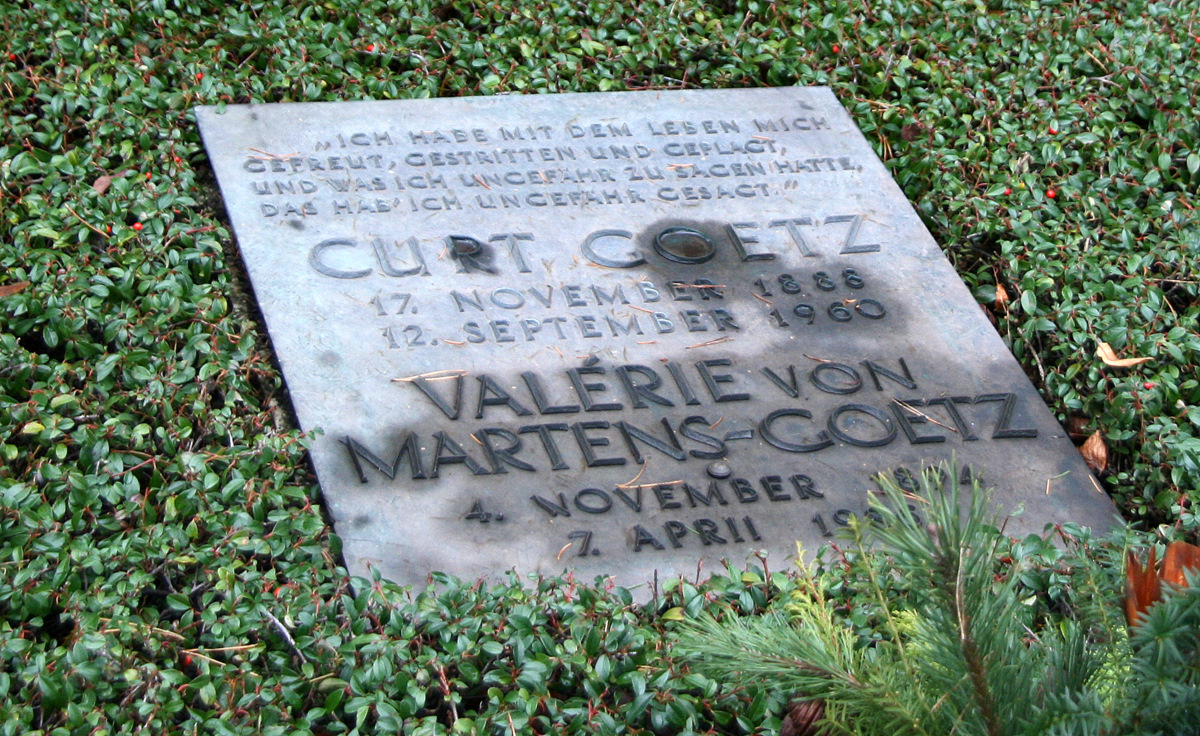
Curt Goetz' and his wife's grave

=== Novels ===
- Tatjana (1944)
- Die Tote von Beverly Hills (1951)

=== Autobiography ===
- Die Memoiren des Peterhans von Binningen (Memoirs Vol. 1, 1960)
- Die Verwandlung des Peterhans von Binningen (Memoirs Vol. 2)
- Wir wandern, wir wandern ... (Memoirs Vol. 3, Reminiscences of Valérie von Martens, 1963)

=== Other works ===
- Gesammelte Werke (1958)
- Viel Spaß mit Curt Goetz (1964) – Fritz Fröhling
- Das große Curt-Goetz-Album, Bilder eines Lebens (1968)
- Curt's Geschichten
- Ergoetzliches (1974)
- Curt Goetz - In deinem Sinne (1982)
- Sämtliche Bühnenwerke (1987)

== Filmography ==
- Hokuspokus, directed by Gustav Ucicky (Germany, 1930, based on the play Hokuspokus)
  - The Temporary Widow, directed by Gustav Ucicky (UK, 1930, based on the play Hokuspokus)
- Doctor Praetorius, directed by Curt Goetz and Karl Peter Gillmann (West Germany, 1950, based on the play Dr. med. Hiob Prätorius)
- People Will Talk, directed by Joseph L. Mankiewicz (1951, based on the play Dr. med. Hiob Prätorius)
- The House in Montevideo, directed by Curt Goetz and Valerie von Martens (West Germany, 1951, based on the play Das Haus in Montevideo)
- Hocuspocus, directed by Kurt Hoffmann (West Germany, 1953, based on the play Hokuspokus)
- Ingeborg, directed by Wolfgang Liebeneiner (West Germany, 1960, based on the play Ingeborg)
- The House in Montevideo, directed by Helmut Käutner (West Germany, 1963, based on the play Das Haus in Montevideo)
- Dead Woman from Beverly Hills, directed by Michael Pfleghar (West Germany, 1964, based on the novel Die Tote von Beverly Hills)
- Praetorius, directed by Kurt Hoffmann (West Germany, 1965, based on the play Dr. med. Hiob Prätorius)
- Hocuspocus, directed by Kurt Hoffmann (West Germany, 1966, based on the play Hokuspokus)
- The Liar and the Nun, directed by Rolf Thiele (West Germany, 1967, based on the play Der Lügner und die Nonne)

=== Screenplays ===
- Friedrich Schiller (dir. Curt Goetz, 1923)
- Lucky Kids (dir. Paul Martin, 1936)
  - Les gais lurons (dir. Paul Martin and Jacques Natanson, 1936)
- Land of Love (dir. Reinhold Schünzel, 1937)
- Seven Slaps (dir. Paul Martin, 1937)
- Napoleon Is to Blame for Everything (dir. Curt Goetz, 1938)

=== Directing ===
- Friedrich Schiller (1923)
- Napoleon Is to Blame for Everything (1938)
- Doctor Praetorius (1950)
- The House in Montevideo (1951)

=== Acting ===
- Schwarzes Blut (1912)
- Nur nicht heiraten (1915)
- Der Hund mit dem Monokel (1916)
- Fliegende Schatten (1916)
- Rose of the Wilderness (1918)
- Imprisoned Soul (1918) as Stefan Rainer
- Fantasie des Aristide Caré (1918) as Gentleman / Einbrecher Aristide Caré
- I Don't Want to Be a Man (1918) as Dr. Kersten
- Katinka (1918)
- Ruth's Two Husbands (1919) as Robert Holversen
- The Revenge of Count Silvain (1920) as Count Silvain
- Das Skelett des Herrn Markutius (1920) as Detektiv Joe Deebs
- The Lady in Black (1920) as Joe Deebs
- Tragedy of Love (1923) as Prosecutor
- Die Gräfin von Paris (1923) as Staatsanwalt
- All for Money (1923) as Graf Ehrhardt
- Napoleon Is to Blame for Everything (1938) as Lord Arthur Cavershoot
- Doctor Praetorius (1950) as Dr. Hiob Prätorius
- The House in Montevideo (1951) as Professor Traugott Nägler
- Hocuspocus (1953) as Peer Bille
