= The Girl of Last Night =

1938 film

- Directed by: Peter Paul Brauer
- Written by: Karl Georg Külb
- Produced by: Peter Paul Brauer
- Starring: Willy Fritsch; Georg Alexander; Hans Leibelt
- Cinematography: Robert Baberske
- Edited by: Fritz Stapenhorst
- Music by: Werner Bochmann
- Production company: UFA
- Distributed by: UFA
- Release date: 2 April 1938
- Country: Germany
- Language: German

The Girl of Last Night (German: Das Mädchen von gestern Nacht) is a 1938 German comedy film directed by Peter Paul Brauer and starring Willy Fritsch, Georg Alexander and Hans Leibelt. It is set in England.

The film's sets were designed by Carl Ludwig Kirmse. It was shot at the Tempelhof Studios in Berlin.

== Plot ==
Lord Stanley Stalton is a dutiful attaché in the Foreign Office's diplomatic corps in London, who prefers his job to private pleasure and thereby draws the ridicule of his colleagues. Lady Darnmore, a respected hostess of fine salons and associated with Stalton's superior, Lord Radley, invites Stalton to one of her functions to set him up with Evelyn, the banker Barrow's only daughter. Instructed by Lord Radley to prepare an extensive report on American entrepreneur Jack Miller, Stalton cancels at short notice, whereupon Lady Darnmore sends him a box ticket for the opera. The second box card is given to Evelyn, who is sent to the opera by her mother under various rules of conduct in the hope of getting to know Stalton better.

From now on, a comedy of mistaken identity unfolds.

On the way home, Lord Stanley Stalton bumps into his old school friend Stanley Chestnut, who is being thrown out of the bank after an interview with banker Barrow. Chestnut uses a trick to get the opera ticket from him and meets Evelyn in the box, who mistakes him for Lord Stanley Stalton because of his first name. The two hit it off right away and spend the rest of the evening together at a wine bar, although Stanley Chestnut is shocked to learn that Evelyn is apparently the daughter of the man who kicked him out that afternoon. At the same time, banker Barrow files a complaint with the police after his maid informs him that a pearl necklace was allegedly stolen from Evelyn's room. Scotland Yard immediately starts looking for the thief and, in the dead of night, pursues a young woman, among others, who spontaneously escapes through an open patio door into the bedroom and bed of a young man sleeping there - Lord Stanley Stalton. She is able to deceive the police officer pursuing her and pretends to be Stalton's wife. Stalton, woken up by the noise and overwhelmed by her presence, is soon taken with the young woman. These two also immediately like each other, but the woman quickly leaves his house after Stalton has put her pearl necklace on her.

When Stalton shows up at his workplace the next morning, he is awaiting a warning from his superior. The pursuit of a pair of thieves and the fact that Lord Stanley Stalton and his alleged wife were disturbed in their sleep as a result have reached the press. Because everyone in London knows that Stalton isn't married, the reputation of the diplomatic corps seems tarnished. The banker couple Barrow also read these headlines and assume that Evelyn lost her innocence the night she spent with "Stanley". He should bear the consequences for this and marry Evelyn. When Stanley accidentally calls Chestnut, he is invited to dinner at Barrow's, thinking he is Stalton.

Meanwhile, the jewel thief turns out to be Jean Miller, the American entrepreneur's daughter, whose nocturnal outing was only due to the desire to get away from home and experience something exciting. A private detective assigned to her brings her back home. The next day, she and her father attend a reception given by Lady Darnmore, where Lord Stalton is also present. For his part, Stalton is amazed and thinks the financial mogul and his daughter are the thieves they are looking for. He ensnares Jean and secretly steals the pearl necklace from her to return it to Evelyn Barrow. When he arrives at Barrows, he is already expected after Stanley Chesnut, who was originally and erroneously invited, has been expelled from the house again without being able to explain himself beforehand. When Stalton is admitted to Evelyn, the confusion between the two Stanleys is cleared up, but Evelyn asks him not to tell her parents anything, because she loves Stanley Chestnut, but knows how much her father despises him. The string of pearls also turns out not to have been stolen but misplaced. Back at the Foreign Office, Stalton learns the true identity of Jean Miller and decides to bring her the pearl necklace back to the hotel. There he declares his affection for her, but is initially rejected.

All the protagonists are guests at another reception held by Lady Darnmore. Evelyn Barrow and Lord Stalton keep up appearances, unaware that Evelyn's father plans to announce their engagement. When Jean, who is also present, finds out about this, she uses a trick to win Stalton back, and her father then announces their engagement. Banker Barrow, who then recognizes the mix-up and assumes that his daughter has lost her innocence to Stanley Chestnut, now agrees.

== Main cast ==
- Willy Fritsch as Stanley Stalton
- Georg Alexander as Lord Radley
- Hans Leibelt as Mr. Barrow
- Hansi Arnstaedt as Mrs. Barrow
- Ingeborg von Kusserow as Evelyn Barrow, Tochter
- Paul Westermeier as Mr. Miller
- Gusti Huber as Jean Miller, seine Tochter
- Hermine Ziegler as Tante Peggy, seine Schwesster
- Hilde Hildebrand as Lady Darnmore
- Rudolf Platte as Stanley Chestnut
- Ernst Waldow as Robert Shields, Attaché
- Fritz Lafontaine as MacGregor, Attaché
- Werner Finck as Bärtiger Arzt
- Eduard Bornträger as Tom
- Georg H. Schnell as Parker
- Hermann Pfeiffer as Inspektor Green

== Bibliography ==
- Bock, Hans-Michael; Bergfelder, Tim, eds. (2009). The Concise Cinegraph: Encyclopaedia of German Cinema. New York: Berghahn Books. ISBN 978-1-57181-655-9.
