= Hocuspocus (1953 film) =

1953 film

- Directed by: Kurt Hoffmann
- Written by: Curt Goetz (play); Curt Goetz (screenplay)
- Produced by: Hans Domnick
- Starring: Curt Goetz; Valerie von Martens; Hans Nielsen
- Cinematography: Richard Angst; Alfred Westphal
- Edited by: Fritz Stapenhorst
- Music by: Franz Grothe
- Production company: Domnick Filmproduktion
- Distributed by: Herzog Film; Sascha Film
- Release date: 1 September 1953
- Running time: 90 minutes
- Country: West Germany
- Language: German

Hocuspocus (German: Hokuspokus) is a 1953 West German comedy crime film directed by Kurt Hoffmann and starring Curt Goetz, Valerie von Martens (his wife) and Hans Nielsen. Based on Goetz's own play from 1926 and on the first movie of 1930 of which an English-language version was made at the same time, it was remade in 1966 in color as Hocuspocus. It was shot at Göttingen Studios. The film's sets were designed by the art director's Kurt Herlth and Hermann Warm.

== Plot ==
After the mediocre painter Hilmar Kjerulf has vanished, interest in his paintings rose significantly. One of his new admirers who acquired a painting is the President of the criminal court, handling the case of his soft-spoken widow Agda Kjerulf when she is accused of having drowned her inept husband in a lake. She simply defends herself by remaining silent or theatrically dropping unconscious until her lawyer steps down and she is to be sentenced.

A mysterious person warns the court president several times that somebody wants to kill him on a certain date, and the supposed victim calls for his friend and lawyer, Mr. Graham, to come for support. The mysterious visitor shows up, and demonstrates evidence seemingly proving that Mr. Graham is about to kill his friend with poison. They call the police who handcuffs him, but he frees himself quickly. Revealing his identity as Peer Bille, son of a famous circus family, formerly an illusionist, speed painter, escape artist, he confesses that the evidence he just presented is nothing but "hocuspocus", sleight of hand tricks like sugar in the wine and a forged ticket pulled from the sleeve. He urges the court president to take a particularly critical look at the evidence in the current case and even hands him the weapon that killed Kjerulf, a razor.

The next day in court the President learns, that the new attorney that has taken over the defence of Mrs. Kjerulf is Peer Bille who, in order to not remain a cheap "hocuspocus" all his life, had been kicked from his fathers circus' to learn a proper profession, law. Bille and the state attorney try to reconstruct the last day of the late painter, bringing in exhibits like a suspended rowing boat. Bille can make some points but confusion arises when witness Kiebutz testifies that Mrs. Kjerulf has received conjugational visits from a man soon after the supposed death of Mr. Kjerulf. Eventually Mr. Graham is allowed to investigate and succeeds in proving Peer Bille to be much more than a counsellor for Mrs. Kjerulf.

Now the tides turn against Bille, who, as a "hocuspocus", also is an escape artist. And a speed painter.

== Cast ==
- Curt Goetz as Peer Bille
- Valerie von Martens as Agda Kjerulf
- Hans Nielsen as court president
- Ernst Waldow as prosecutor
- Erich Ponto as Mr. Arthur Graham
- Elisabeth Flickenschildt as witness Kiebutz
- Joachim Teege as witness Eunano
- Margrit Ensinger
- Mila Kopp
- Fritz Rasp as attendant
- Tilo von Berlepsch
- Fritz Brandt

== Bibliography ==
- Thomas Elsaesser & Michael Wedel. The BFI companion to German cinema. British Film Institute, 1999.
