= Darling of the Sailors =

- Directed by: Hans Hinrich
- Written by: Rudolf Brettschneider; Karl Peter Gillmann; Douglas Sirk
- Produced by: Walter Tjaden
- Starring: Traudl Stark; Wolf Albach-Retty; Richard Romanowsky
- Cinematography: Franz Eigner; Oskar Schnirch
- Edited by: René Métain
- Music by: Willy Schmidt-Gentner
- Production companies: Mondial-Film; Patria-Film
- Distributed by: Kiba Kinobetriebsanstalt
- Release date: 23 December 1937
- Running time: 78 minutes
- Country: Austria
- Language: German

Darling of the Sailors (German: Liebling der Matrosen) is a 1937 Austrian comedy film directed by Hans Hinrich and starring Traudl Stark, Wolf Albach-Retty and Richard Romanowsky.

The film's sets were designed by the art director Hans Ledersteger. It was shot on location around Dubrovnik on the Croatian coast.

== Cast ==
- Traudl Stark as Christl Hofer
- Wolf Albach-Retty as Kapitänleutnant Igor Juritsch
- Richard Romanowsky as Generalkonsul O'Brien
- Hertha Feiler as Mary O'Brien
- Lotte Lang as Anita - Kindermädchen
- Hans Frank as Kommandant des Kriegsschiffes
- Julius Brandt as Kapitän des Handelsschiffes
- Hans Unterkircher as Fürst Wurozeff
- Eduard Loibner as Bootsmaat
- Willi Hufnagel as Matrose Stefan
- Karl Ehmann as Jean, Diener
- Ernst Pröckl as Reisebüroangestellter
- Mihail Xantho as Polizeikommissar
- Philipp von Zeska as Steward
- Polly Koß as Mara
- Otto Ambros as Matrose
- Hans Ferigo as Matrose
- Fritz Lieberté as Matrose
- Otto Glaser as Schiffskoch
- Robert Horky as Kofferverkäufer
- August Keilholz as Hotelportier
- Carmen Perwolf as Spielwarenverkäuferin
- Josef Stiegler as Wohnungsvermieter

== Bibliography ==
- Jon Tuska, Vicki Piekarski & David Wilson. Close-Up: The Hollywood Director. Scarecrow Press, 1978.
