= The House in Montevideo (play) =

Play written by Curt Goetz

The House in Montevideo (German: Das Haus in Montevideo) is a 1945 German comedy play by Curt Goetz. A strait-laced father of twelve discovers that his long-lost sister Josephine, who he had cast out of the family for having a child out of wedlock, has made a career as Maria Machado, an opera singer in Montevideo in Uruguay, and has now died, leaving some real estate as dowry to his eldest teenage daughter, Atlanta, who was named after the ship on which the couple was married at sea.

The bulk of her considerable fortune, though, would go any female in her brother's household, who would suffer "a tragedy similar to hers", that is, give birth to an illegitimate child, on the condition that this occurs before the 19th birthday of Atlanta next year. The father thus tried to make some immoral suggestions to the fiancee of his daughter, to no avail. When the young couple wants to get properly married, and on the very same ship, they receive news, "a tragedy" occurs, and not one but two land based weddings follow.

The play was staged in 1945 on Broadway as It's a Gift, starring Goetz and his wife. The story was based on a 1924 one-act play The Dead Aunt, which Goetz expanded and revised for the new work.

== Adaptations ==
The play has been turned into films twice: a 1951 film The House in Montevideo starring Goetz himself and his wife Valérie von Martens and a 1963 version The House in Montevideo starring Heinz Rühmann and Ruth Leuwerik.

== Bibliography ==
- Grange, William. Historical Dictionary of German Literature To 1945. Scarecrow Press, 2010.
