= Doctor Praetorius (film) =

1950 film

- Directed by: Karl Peter Gillmann; Curt Goetz
- Written by: Curt Goetz (play)
- Produced by: Hans Domnick
- Starring: Curt Goetz; Valerie von Martens; Erich Ponto
- Cinematography: Fritz Arno Wagner
- Edited by: Fritz Stapenhorst
- Music by: Franz Grothe
- Production company: Domnick Filmproduktion
- Distributed by: Herzog Film
- Release date: 15 January 1950
- Running time: 95 minutes
- Country: West Germany
- Language: German

Doctor Praetorius or Woman's Doctor Praetorius (German: Frauenarzt Dr. Prätorius) is a 1950 West German comedy drama film directed by Karl Peter Gillmann and Curt Goetz and starring Goetz, Valerie von Martens and Erich Ponto. It was based on Goetz's own hit play which was made into the American film People Will Talk in the following year. A second German film, Praetorius, was released in 1965, starring Heinz Rühmann. It was shot at the Göttingen Studios. The film's sets were designed by the art director Walter Haag.

== Plot ==
Because of his kindness and philanthropy, Dr. Praetorius enjoys great popularity among patients, the medical staff and the student body alike. Only his colleague professor Speiter begrudges his success.

When his patient Maria Violetta wants to commit suicide because of an extramarital pregnancy, Prätorius takes care of the young woman. He attempts to break the news gently to her father but the latter mistakes him for a more than welcome admirer of his daughter. Since a deep affection has developed between the doctor and his patient, the two eventually marry. Their married bliss fuels the envy of professor Speiter who believes he can uncover dark points from the doctor's past. But Praetorius succeeds in refuting all allegations before a court of honor with wit and astonishing revelations.

Goetz's production has been noted for highlighting the particularly tragicomic and melancholic moments of the play. Humanistic values are emphasized and the issues of abortion and capital punishment are critically examined. In addition, Goetz gives prominence to the protagonist's elusive search for the microbe of human stupidity, which he believes to be the cause of envy, hatred and war.

== Cast ==
- Curt Goetz as Dr. Hiob Prätorius
- Valerie von Martens as Maria Violetta
- Erich Ponto as Professor Speiter
- Bruno Hübner as Shunderson
- Albert Florath as Pastor Hellriegel
- Rudolf Reiff as Prof. Klotz
- Paul Mederow
- Hedwig Wangel
- Gertrud Wolle
- Wilhelm Meyer-Ottens
- Eugen Dumont
- Werner Westerholt
- Helga Viermann
- Margit Kay
- Nikolaus Schilling as Student
- Horst Tappert as Verkäufer

== Bibliography ==
- Rentschler, Eric, ed. (2013). German Film and Literature: Adaptations and Transformations. Hoboken: Taylor & Francis. ISBN 978-1-136-36873-8.
