= The Cabbie's Song =

1936 film

- Directed by: E. W. Emo
- Written by: E. W. Emo; Hanns Sassmann
- Starring: Paul Hörbiger; Gusti Huber; Franz Schafheitlin
- Cinematography: Eduard Hoesch
- Edited by: René Métain
- Music by: Nico Dostal
- Production company: Algefa Film
- Distributed by: Bavaria Film
- Release date: 13 November 1936
- Running time: 78 minutes
- Country: Germany
- Language: German

The Cabbie's Song (German: Fiakerlied) is a 1936 German romantic drama film directed by E. W. Emo and starring Paul Hörbiger, Gusti Huber, and Franz Schafheitlin. The film offers a nostalgic view of Vienna during the old Imperial Era. It takes its name from a popular Viennese song, and is set in the 1880s at the time of the song's composition. It was made at the Bavaria Studios in Munich and partly shot on location in Budapest and Vienna. The film's sets were designed by the art director Emil Hasler.

== Cast ==
- Paul Hörbiger as Ferdinand Strödl, Fiakerkutscher
- Gusti Huber as Ludmilla Berndt, Praterartistin
- Franz Schafheitlin as Max Jolander, ein feiner Herr
- Erika Dannhoff as Franzi Preminger, ein junges Mädchen
- Hermann Erhardt as Golo, der Messerwerfer
- Josefine Dora as Frau Krögl, Schaubudenbesitzerin
- Else Reval as Witwe Henghappel, Fuhrwerksbesitzerin
- Tilde Hölzlin as Kathi Stübinger, Soubrette

== Bibliography ==
- Klaus, Ulrich J. Deutsche Tonfilme: Jahrgang 1936. Klaus-Archiv, 1988.
- Von Dassanowsky, Robert (2005). Austrian Cinema: A History. Jefferson, NC: McFarland. ISBN 978-1-4766-2147-0.
