= Gusti Huber =

Austrian-American actress (1914–1993)

- Born: Auguste Huber; July 27, 1914; Wieden, Cisleithania, Austria-Hungary
- Died: July 12, 1993 (aged 78); Mount Kisco, New York, U.S.
- Education: University of Music and Performing Arts Vienna
- Occupation: Actress
- Years active: 1929–1961
- Spouses: Gotfrid Köchert (m. 1939; div. 1944) Joseph Besch (m. 1946)
- Children: 4, including Bibi Besch
- Relatives: Samantha Mathis (granddaughter)

Auguste "Gusti" Huber (July 27, 1914 – July 12, 1993) was an Austrian-American actress. She had a successful career on Broadway and was critically acclaimed as Edith Frank in the 1959 production of The Diary of Anne Frank.

== Early life and career ==
Huber was born in Wieden, 4th district of Vienna, Austria, in 1914. She received training as an actress from de:Rudolph Beer, who later arranged her stage debut in Zurich. She had her first film role in 1935 in Tanzmusik, followed by Savoy-Hotel 217 (1936). One year later she achieved her career breakthrough in the film adaptation of Unentschuldigte Stunde. Her better-known films include Der Mann, von dem man spricht (1937), Land of Love (1937), Kleiner Mann – ganz gross! (1938), Eine Frau für Drei (1939), and Jenny und der Herr im Frack (1941), after which she worked for four years at the Viennese Burgtheater and elsewhere onstage.

After the end of World War II, Huber moved to the United States. She acted only occasionally thereafter, most notably appearing on Broadway three times, in Flight into Egypt, as Margot Wendice in Dial M for Murder and a performance The Diary of Anne Frank.

== Links to Nazism ==
Around 1946, Huber moved to the United States with her second husband, Joseph Besch, an officer in the U.S. Army. Besch boasted that his wife was "the first Austrian actress to be cleared by the American military government".

Her last film role was Das Tagebuch der Anne Frank (The Diary of Anne Frank; 1959), in which she reprised the role of Anne Frank's mother, Edith, which caused controversy in some circles as Huber was rumored to have been too close to the Nazis, but Garson Kanin reportedly stood by the casting.

American Heritage magazine wrote of Huber's attempts to distance herself from her wartime past:

In Vienna before the war she [Huber] had refused to work with a Jewish actor and director, and in Germany during the war she had continued to make movies under the Third Reich...At the very same time Anne was murdered in Bergen-Belsen, Gusti was busy shooting a screen comedy...But Huber was a Broadway star and [the charges against her] never...gained traction.

== Family ==
Huber married Austrian Gotfrid Köchert in 1939. The couple had two daughters, Christiana Barbara (1939) and actress Bibiana "Bibi" Maria (1942), while Köchert served with Nazi Germany's Wehrmacht during World War II. The marriage ended in divorce in 1944. In 1946, Huber married Joseph Besch, an officer in the U.S. Army. The family immediately moved to the United States and Besch adopted Christina and Bibi, who took his surname. The couple had two more children together, Drea and Andrew. Huber's grandchildren include actress Samantha Mathis, Bibi's daughter.

== Selected filmography ==
- Dance Music (1935)
- Savoy Hotel 217 (1936)
- The Cabbie's Song (1936)
- Land of Love (1937)
- The Unexcused Hour (1937)
- Between the Parents (1938)
- The Girl of Last Night (1938)
- The Optimist (1938)
- Gabriele Dambrone (1943)
- The Diary of Anne Frank (1959)
