= Karl Peter Gillmann =

German actor, screenwriter and film director (1900–1963)

- Born: 3 December 1900; Landau in der Pfalz, German Empire
- Died: 19 January 1963 (aged 62); Munich, Bavaria, West Germany
- Other name: Karl P. Gillmann
- Occupations: Actor, Writer, Director
- Years active: 1924-1954 (film)

Karl Peter Gillmann (1900–1963) was a German actor, screenwriter and film director. He co-wrote the 1938 comedy Napoleon Is to Blame for Everything with Curt Goetz.

== Selected filmography ==
=== Screenwriter ===
- One Hour of Happiness (1931)
- The Private Life of Louis XIV (1935)
- Pillars of Society (1935)
- The Postman from Longjumeau (1936)
- Intermezzo (1936)
- Darling of the Sailors (1937)
- The Unexcused Hour (1937)
- Napoleon Is to Blame for Everything (1938)
- Bachelor's Paradise (1939)
- Trouble Backstairs (1949)
- Scandal at the Embassy (1950)
- A Heidelberg Romance (1951)
- Diary of a Married Woman (1953)
- Agatha, Stop That Murdering! (1960)

=== Director ===
- Doctor Praetorius (1950)

== Bibliography ==
- Langford, Michelle. Directory of World Cinema: Germany. Intellect Books, 2012.
