= Hans Domnick =

German film editor (1909–1985)

- Born: 31 May 1909; Greifswald, Pomerania; Germany
- Died: 6 February 1985 (aged 75); San Diego, California; United States
- Other name: Hans Josef Ferdinand Wolfgang Domnick
- Occupations: Film editor, producer
- Years active: 1941 - 1968

Hans Domnick (1909–1985) was a German film editor, film producer and documentary maker. His brother was the Producer/Director Ottomar Domnick. In Germany he is best remembered for his two-part documentary from 1958 Dream Road of the World ("Traumstraße der Welt"), re-released in 1968 in one part as Dream Road of the World, which described the Pan-American Highway from Alaska to Tierra del Fuego.

== Selected filmography ==
=== Producer ===
- Amico (1949)
- Doctor Praetorius (1950)
- The House in Montevideo (1951)
- Hocuspocus (1953)
- The House in Montevideo (1963)
- Praetorius (1965)

=== Editor ===
- Violanta (1942)
- Gabriele Dambrone (1943)
- Why Are You Lying, Elisabeth? (1944)

=== Director ===
- My Sixteen Sons (1956)
