= Fritz Stapenhorst =

German film director and editor

- Occupations: Editor, Director
- Years active: 1935–1963 (film)

Fritz Stapenhorst was a German film director and editor. He was the son of the producer Günther Stapenhorst.

== Selected filmography ==
=== Editor ===
- The Girl from the Marsh Croft (1935)
- The Girl of Last Night (1938)
- What Now, Sibylle? (1938)
- The Girl with a Good Reputation (1938)
- Kitty and the World Conference (1939)
- Keepers of the Night (1949)
- Where the Trains Go (1949)
- Two Times Lotte (1950)
- Doctor Praetorius (1950)
- My Name is Niki (1952)
- Nights on the Road (1952)
- Hocuspocus (1953)
- Heroism after Hours (1955)

=== Director ===
- Heldentum nach Ladenschluß (1955, anthology film)
- Parole Heimat (1955, anthology film)
- Sie schreiben mit (1958-?, TV series)
- Es war die erste Liebe (1958)
- Als ich noch der Waldbauernbub war... (1963, TV film)
- Aus meiner Waldheimat (1963, TV film)
- Als ich beim Käthele im Wald war (1963, TV film)

== Bibliography ==
- Wolfgang Jacobsen & Hans Helmut Prinzler. Käutner. Spiess, 1992.
