= My Sixteen Sons =

1956 film

- Directed by: Hans Domnick
- Written by: Hans Domnick
- Produced by: Hans Domnick
- Starring: Lil Dagover; Karl Ludwig Diehl; Else Reval
- Cinematography: Fritz Arno Wagner
- Edited by: Hans Domnick
- Music by: Wolfgang Zeller
- Production company: Hans Domnick Filmproduktion
- Distributed by: Schorcht Filmverleih
- Release date: 9 March 1956
- Running time: 92 minutes
- Country: West Germany
- Language: German

My Sixteen Sons (German: Meine 16 Söhne) is a 1956 West German musical drama film directed by Hans Domnick and starring Lil Dagover, Karl Ludwig Diehl and Else Reval. The film's sets were designed by the art director Gabriel Pellon.

== Synopsis ==
Frau Giselius hosts a music competition in Bremen in memory of her son who was killed in the Second World War. To promote European harmony, she invites four string quartets, two from Germany and one each from France and Switzerland. She affectionately refers to the competitors as her "sixteen sons".

== Cast ==
- Lil Dagover as Frau Senator Giselius
- Margrit Kay as Renate Giselius, ihre Schwiegertochter
- Karl Ludwig Diehl as Dr. Wesendahl
- Else Reval as Lina, Haushälterin bei Frau Giselius
- Herbert Hübner as Direktor der Berliner Musikhochschule
- Kurt Vespermann as Prof. Peinemann
- Erich Hasberg as Kulturreferent Thormann
- Helmuth Lohner as Dieter Ranke
- Harry Meyen as Herbert Schwerdtfeger
- Lutz Moik as Christian Massow
- Klaus Günter Neumann as Paul Selters
- Beat Hadorn as Gottfried Baumann
- Jan Corazolla as Baptiste Tessie

== Bibliography ==
- Bock, Hans-Michael & Bergfelder, Tim. The Concise CineGraph. Encyclopedia of German Cinema. Berghahn Books, 2009.
