= Hanne Wieder =

German actress (1925–1990)

- Born: Hanne Wieder; 8 May 1925; Münden, Germany
- Died: 11 May 1990 (aged 65); Feldafing, West Germany
- Occupation: Actress
- Years active: 1958–

Signature
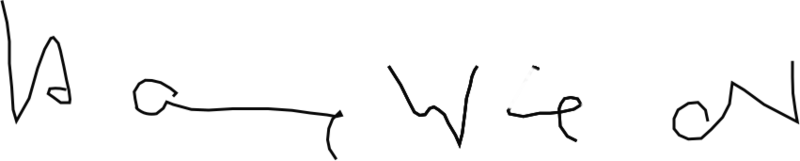

Hanne Wieder (May 8, 1925 – May 11, 1990) was a German television and film actress.

== Selected filmography ==
- Rosemary (1958)
- Sin Began with Eve (1958)
- Heiße Ware (1959)
- Labyrinth (1959)
- Marili (1959)
- The Haunted Castle (1960)
- Murder Party (1961)
- Chikita (1961)
- Snow White and the Seven Jugglers (1962)
- The House in Montevideo (1963)
- Melissa (1966, TV miniseries)
- Once a Greek (1966)
- Count Bobby, The Terror of The Wild West (1966)
- Seventeen and Anxious (1970)
- Rosemary's Daughter (1976)
- Paradise (1986)
