= Land of Love =

1937 film by Reinhold Schünzel

- Directed by: Reinhold Schünzel
- Written by: Curt Goetz; Eva Leidmann; Reinhold Schünzel
- Produced by: Georg Witt
- Starring: Albert Matterstock; Gusti Huber; Valerie von Martens; Wilhelm Bendow
- Cinematography: Werner Bohne
- Edited by: Arnfried Heyne
- Music by: Alois Melichar
- Production company: Georg Witt-Film
- Distributed by: Tobis Film
- Release date: 10 June 1937
- Running time: 91 minutes
- Country: Germany
- Language: German

Land of Love (German: Land der Liebe) is a 1937 German romance film directed by Reinhold Schünzel and starring Albert Matterstock, Gusti Huber and Valerie von Martens. It was shot at the Bavaria Studios in Munich and the Johannisthal Studios in Berlin. The film's sets were designed by the art directors Wilhelm Depenau, Kurt Dürnhöfer and Ludwig Reiber. Although Schünzel was Jewish, he had been allowed to continue directing films in Germany after the Nazi takeover. However, this film faced objections from the censors and from Joseph Goebbels. It was briefly shown and then disappeared from cinemas. It was Schünzel's final German film as director, and he went into exile shortly afterwards.

== Cast ==
- Albert Matterstock as König and Franz Schniepex
- Gusti Huber as Prinzessin Julia
- Valerie von Martens as Fürstin Ilonka
- Wilhelm Bendow as Ministerpräsident
- Oskar Sima as Polizeipräfekt
- Erik Ode as Erster Beamter
- Werner Stock as Zweiter Beamter
- Erich Ziegel as Hofmarschall
- Erich Fiedler as Leutnant Inpetto
- Olga Limburg as Madame Revelli - Direktrice
- Hadrian Maria Netto as Major Roscoe - Adjutant des Königs
- William Huch as Zeremonienmeister
- Erich Walter as Diener Kaspar
- Maria Seidler as Oberin des Klosters
- Heinz Berghaus as Der Verkehrsminister
- Jac Diehl as Ein vollbärtiger Hotelportier
- Hugo Drahower as Minister des Königs
- Paul Ludwig Frey]as Der Korporal der Leibgarde
- Guido Goroll as Der Außenminister
- Helga Karwa as Zweite Brautjungfer
- Carl Martin Kemper as Minister des Königs
- Gerd Klinkhardt as Erster Sergeant
- Fred Köster as Der Diener des Ministerpräsidenten
- Hilde Maris as Erste Brautjungfer
- Paul Rehkopf as Der Innenminister
- Leo Reiter as Minister des Königs
- Walter Schenk as Minister des Königs
- Gert Scott-Iversen as Eine junge Nonne
- Hans Sobierayski as Minister des Königs
- Hans Stiebner as Der Zahlober
- Hilda Thau as Eine Zofe
- Walter Vollmann as Der Buchhändler
- Achim von Biel as Der Adjutant des Ministerpräsidenten
- Bruno Ziener as Ein Lakai
- Rudolf Vones
- Grete Sellin
- Reinhold Gronert
- Charly Huber
- Edith Dathe

== Bibliography ==
- Hake, Sabine (2001). Popular Cinema of the Third Reich. University of Texas Press. ISBN 978-0-292-73458-6.
- Klaus, Ulrich J. Deutsche Tonfilme: Jahrgang 1937. Klaus-Archiv, 1988.
- Prawer, Siegbert Salomon (2005). Between Two Worlds: The Jewish Presence in German and Austrian Film, 1910–1933. Berghahn Books. ISBN 978-1-84545-074-8.
