= René Métain =

German film editor

- Occupation: Editor
- Years active: 1931-1944 (film)

René Métain was a German film editor. His elder brother was the cinematographer Charles Métain. He edited the 1938 comedy Napoleon Is to Blame for Everything.

== Selected filmography ==
- Danton (1931)
- Bobby Gets Going (1931)
- The Empress and I (1933)
- Her Highness the Saleswoman (1933)
- The Only Girl (1933)
- So Ended a Great Love (1934)
- The Princess's Whim (1934)
- Fruit in the Neighbour's Garden (1935)
- Pygmalion (1935)
- Three Girls for Schubert (1936)
- The Cabbie's Song (1936)
- The Emperor's Candlesticks (1936)
- Darling of the Sailors (1937)
- Dangerous Game (1937)
- Napoleon Is to Blame for Everything (1938)
- The Man Who Couldn't Say No (1938)
- Wibbel the Tailor (1939)
- Hotel Sacher (1939)
- We Danced Around the World (1939)
- The Golden Spider (1943)

== Bibliography ==
- Langford, Michelle (2012). Directory of World Cinema: Germany. Intellect Books. ISBN 9781841504650. OCLC 899527628.
