= Valerie von Martens =

German-Austrian actress (1894–1986)

Valérie von Martens (German pronunciation: [ˈvaləˌʁi fɔn ˈmaʁtn̩s]; 4 November 1894 – 7 April 1986), born Valérie Pajér Edle von Mayersperg, was a German-Austrian actress.

Valérie von Martens was born in Lienz, Tirol, daughter of the Austrian admiral Rudolf Pajér Edler von Mayersperg. She was an actress in Vienna when she had a relationship with the cabaret artist Karl Farkas. In 1922 she met the actor Curt Goetz. They married on 20 December 1923 in Berlin. She then appeared with him on stage and screen, mainly in pieces written or directed by him. She co-directed the 1951 film The House in Montevideo with Goetz in which they featured in the lead roles.

She died in Riehen, Switzerland, and is buried in the Heerstrasse cemetery in Berlin, alongside her husband.

== Works ==
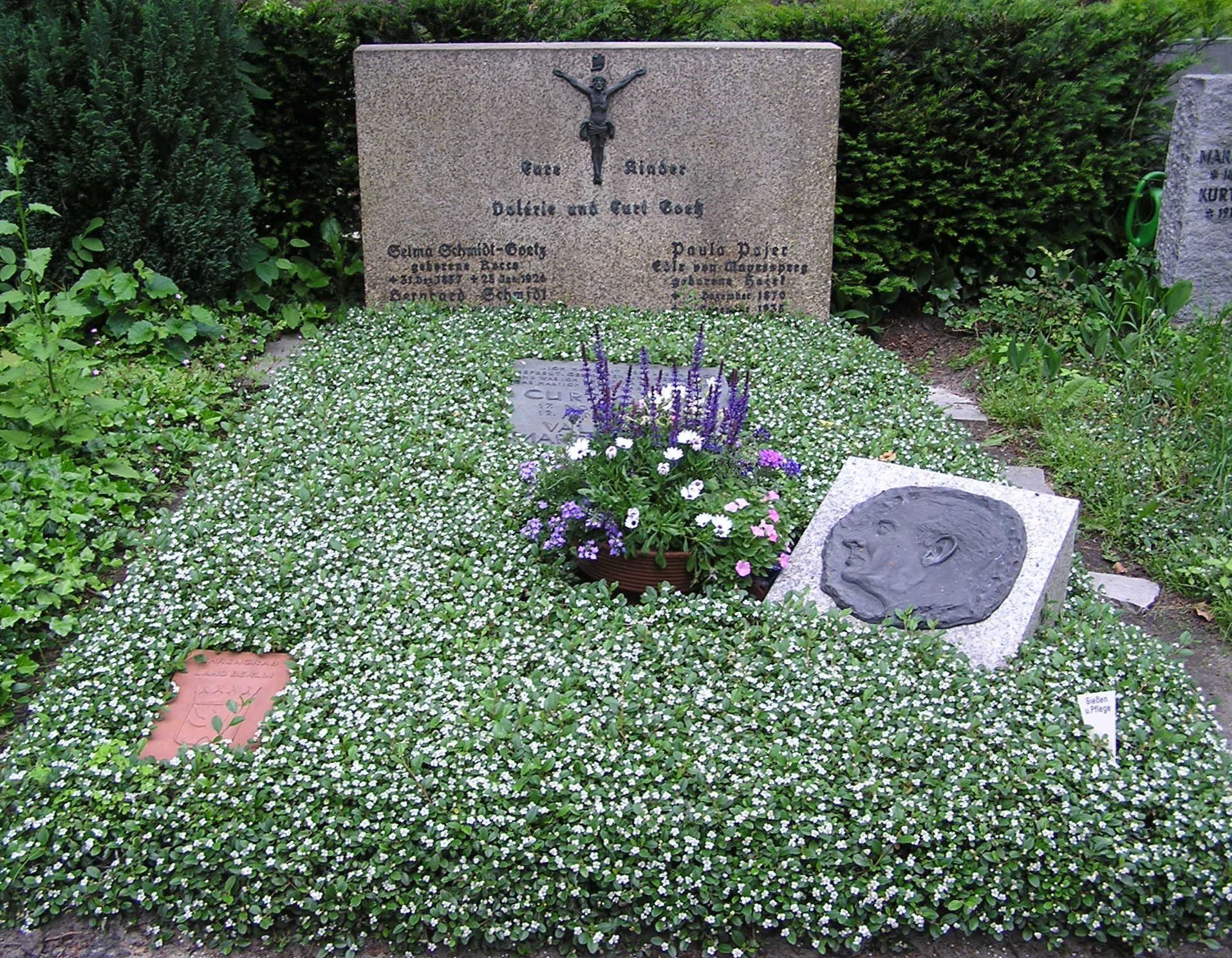
Memorial to Curt Goetz and Valérie von Martens-Goetz at the Heerstraße cemetery, Berlin.

- Die Verwandlung des Peterhans von Binningen (Memoirs Vol. 2', 1962)
- Wir wandern, wir wandern... ('Memoirs, Vol. 3', 1963)
- Die wunderbare und spannende Geschichte des Herrn Blau (1965)
- Das große Curt-Goetz-Album – Bilder eines Lebens (1968)
- Curt's Geschichten, Kurzgeschichten von und über Curt Goetz (1972)
- Curt Goetz – In deinem Sinne (1982)

== Selected filmography ==
- In Thrall to the Claw (1921)
- Land of Love (1937)
- Napoleon Is to Blame for Everything (1938)
- Doctor Praetorius (1950)
- The House in Montevideo (1951)
- Hocuspocus (1953)
