= Günther Hofmann =

German opera baritone (1927–2013)

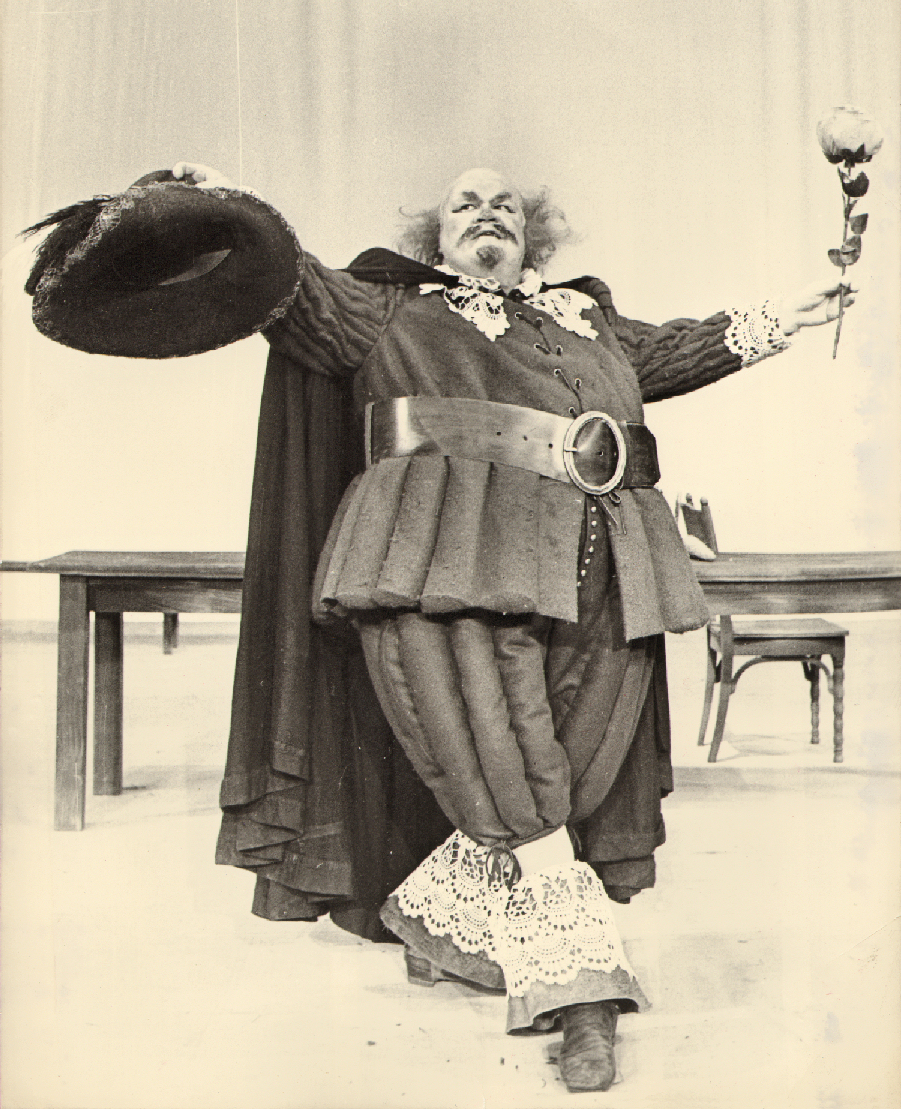
Günther Hofmann in the title role of Verdi's Falstaff, 1972

Günther Hofmann (2 October 1927 – 13 November 2013) was a German operatic bass-baritone, opera manager and director.

== Life ==
=== Childhood and school ===
Hofmann was born in Johannstadt, Dresden, in humble circumstances. Even as a young boy, he had the desire to become an opera singer. In his autobiography he writes: "Every evening I visited the Semperoper Dresdner (standing room 1.80 marks). ... Meanwhile I learned from Reclams Universal-Bibliothek aria texts by heart and tormented my dear piano teacher with the study of opera piano literature, ... which I also soon performed ... by heart and with orchestral effort." After 4th grade in his primary school, he was proposed for the entrance examination to the Dresdner Kreuzchor in 1938, which he passed. However, his parents were against it because of the boarding school stay it would entail, and so he was only transferred to a secondary school.

During the war he was first a tram conductor in wartime service with the Dresden trams, later an electrical trainee at VEM Sachsenwerk Niedersedlitz. He was also an extra at the opera and the theatre. In this way, he got to make acquaintance with well-known artists, as well as the repertoire, singers and conductors, and the stagecraft of the time. Kurt Böhme became his role model. As an extra, he experienced Richard Strauss conducting the opera Capriccio.

=== Military service and captivity ===
After getting his Abitur (8 June 1944) he was drafted into the Reich Labour Service and then into the Wehrmacht. His basic and radio operator training was followed by horse care in the cavalry barracks Neuruppin and Kurzig (now Polish Międzyrzecz). On 23 December 1944 he was discharged; on 12 January 1945 he was transferred to the artillery replacement and training battalion near Prague (then Protectorate of Bohemia and Moravia). He experienced the end of the war without any significant combat duty and after the surrender he went on foot in the direction of Bavaria. Near Písek he came into US custody; in Blatná he was handed over to Czech partisans, then to the Red Army. This was followed by a hardship march to Brno, where he was admitted to an epidemic hospital (former girls' school below Špilberk Castle) with dysentery, collapsed and was pronounced dead (13 July 1945). A Soviet doctor discovered last signs of life and saved his life. This event shaped his gratitude to the Russian people. In November 1945 he was transported by passenger train via Vienna, Szeged, Odessa, Gori to Tbilisi (district of Naphtlug/Navtlugi/Navtlughi on the river Kura) to camp 236, where he arrived on 20 December 1945.

With musically like-minded prisoners of war and with the support of Soviet and Georgian camp officers, he succeeded in staging and performing plays and attending the Rustaveli Theatre in Tbilisi. At the Sunday events, he was the announcer, directed the choir and wrote the notes for songs and overtures for the orchestra and choir from memory. "... my musical talent, the musical memory, which could be reliably recalled, helped me in this." Here he learned Russian and also some Georgian, which was very useful to him.

In the autumn of 1946 there was a change of camp from the district of Nawtlugi to the district of Didube and later to Rustavi. He was released on 6 December 1949. Via Baku, Rostov-on-Don, Kharkov, Kiev, Brest, Frankfurt (Oder) and Cottbus he reached Dresden, where he met his parents again on 23 December 1949.

=== Studies and Zittau ===
In Dresden he was immediately admitted without examination by the Hochschule für Musik Carl Maria von Weber Dresden to study singing with Herbert Meißner (1889–1954). Other teachers were Siegmund Wittig and Fidelio F. Finke. He completed his training as an opera singer "with very good success" in 1953.<!== That's not a valid source: --> His final papers were on Die Entwicklung der russischen Musik im 19th-century zu einer Nationalkunst as well about Das Volk in Boris Godunov. In them, he wrote, among other things: "And what the Tsar had feared had become a reality. The peasant of Russia stood on the stage. The starving people shouted their misery into the perfumed stalls." Here the Russian soul is revealed in the music.

Hofmann found his first employment at the Gerhart-Hauptmann-Theater Görlitz-Zittau as Erbförster Cuno in Weber's Der Freischütz and as Tommaso in d'Alberts' Tiefland. Guest roles took him among others to the Theater Chemnitz. In Zittau, he met his future wife as a dancer. In 1955, they married and moved to Meiningen.

=== Meiningen and Die Oper ===
Hofmann lived and worked in Meiningen until his death in 2013. He was engaged by the Meiningen Court Theatre as a "singer for opera and operetta". He has a son and a daughter, who are also professionally active in the musical ambience. He intensively maintained the connection to Dresden to his parents as well as relatives and friends for many years by means of a GDR Trabant car and such until 2003 without the Bundesautobahn 71.

From 1960 his activities were supplemented with "directing opera and operetta". In 1963, stagings were added. In 1967 he became the first Kammersänger of the Meiningen Theatre. From 1973 to 1993 he was director of the music theatre section of the Meiningen Theatre. He also appeared as a singer in symphony concerts and oratorio performances. He was also engaged by the Deutscher Fernsehfunk.

Extensive guest performances by the Meiningen Theatre in the municipal theatre of České Budějovice were based on his initiative; this tradition was not continued after the 1989 Peaceful Revolution. On the occasion of his guest performance trips to České Budějovice, he still learned Czech.

Hofmann's imprisonment in Georgia, at that time a constituent republic of Soviet Russia, left lasting traces on these people, which can be seen, among other things, in his final theses, his Boris role and his efforts to establish a cooperation between the Tbilisi and Meiningen opera houses. He writes:

"I learned to love the country of Georgia in the 4 years because of its subtropical vegetation and I admired its old culture, which the Red Revolution had decimated and overdone with endless banners and pictures of Stalin. ... I have never given up the thought of seeing the Caucasus and the city of Tbilisi again. Unforgettable memories of the beautiful region and its people, of romantic mountain gorges, of subtropical flora and the mixture of peoples increasingly replaced the gloomy memory of imprisonment. " Consequently, in 1981 and 1984, he visited the Tbilisi Opera for the purpose of exchanging guest performances, whereupon he directed the Georgian opera Mindia by Otar Taktakishvili at the Meiningen Theatre. The premiere took place on 12 November 1981, an exchange did not take place. Regarding his "Boris" role, it was an honour for him to appear in the royal robe of Boris on loan from his hometown from the Staatstheater Dresden from the 1956 production there.

His production of The Flying Dutchman at the Meiningen Theatre before the Peaceful Revolution in the GDR (premièred on 27 May 1988) he placed under the motto: "Ach! ohne Hoffnung wie ich bin, geb' ich mich doch der Hoffnung hin!" (Act 1, Scene 3)

Meiningen and the Meiningen Theatre were his world. He worked there until 1993. Nevertheless, he concludes his autobiography with the words of the Dresden local historian and former director of the Dresden City Museum there. Matthias Griebel: "The further a Dresdener moves away from his homeland, the greater his love for it becomes." Even after his retirement, Hofmann remained connected to the Meiningen opera scene, as his publications attest./>

The maxims of his work were reality and comprehensibility. He was thus at odds with younger directors who put modern interpretations on old operas. Hofmann was "an outstanding singer and thoroughbred comedian", "a 'serving' director", one who was concerned with the issues of the respective authors, as well as "a patient, humanly accessible and administratively consistent 'boss'". In his autobiography he writes: "Terms like 'faithfulness to the original' fell into disrepute because people tried to equate them with 'museum-like' and old-fashioned-unimaginative. I have always taken the authors seriously and taken them at their word: if they write for the scene before 'in the deep forest', I don't have it played on the men's toilet. The right opera music dominates the scene like the Freischütz dominates the forest. Romanticism means: 'reflection' of human conflicts, moods and feelings in nature. This corresponded to the mindset of the time. It is as communicable to us as a painting, as the character of music. Anything else is falsification, is grafting on a foreign ideology, is historical know-it-allism, is annihilation of the author's intention."

He had a special affinity for Richard Strauss and Richard Wagner, recognisable also in his roles. In the opinion of the conductor Rolf Reuter, Hofmann was "the best Faninal in the world". He wrote several essays about Richard Wagner. He was not an opponent of modern media, but still liked to write wonderful, content-rich and very pictorial letters. He knew the importance of the written word in a letter and its permanence. In his letters one can hear him speak.

"As an interpreter of the leading and mostly difficult baritone roles from Verdi to Wagner, Russian operas and works by contemporary composers, Hofmann was an outstanding singer who would certainly have sung his way into a prominent position in major houses. His Sachs, Rigoletto, Boris, Einstein and many a comic character in play operas are unforgettable. In addition, as a stage director, he focused on traditional faithfulness to the work, on singability, and at the same time ensured serious continuity in the Meiningen opera company for thirty years. Most of his younger colleagues have taken exception to his staging style."

He was also active in the social sphere; for example, together with Rolf-Christoph Ullmann, he campaigned with the Meiningen town council for the preservation of the collection of flat theatre by the world-famous stage painter brothers Max and Gotthold Brückner from Coburg in Elisabethenburg Palace. It was always his honour and obligation to show and comment on this collection to his guests. He was one of the few who experienced such a long period of time at the same house; therefore he was a sought-after interlocutor when it came to reviewing history. This was "his" field until his death.

Hofmann had two hobbies: his aquarium and his O scale model railway – costumed with railway cap and traffic paddle. When he moved to Meiningen in 2005, he had to give up both hobbies for reasons of tenancy and age.

From 1995 onwards, but especially from 2008 until the end of 2010, Hofmann wrote and dictated his autobiography with the assistance of Horst Arnold. It comprises 93 typewritten DIN A4 pages.

Hoffmann died in Meiningen at the age of 86. He was buried at the Heidefriedhof (Dresden) in Dresden.

== Roles ==
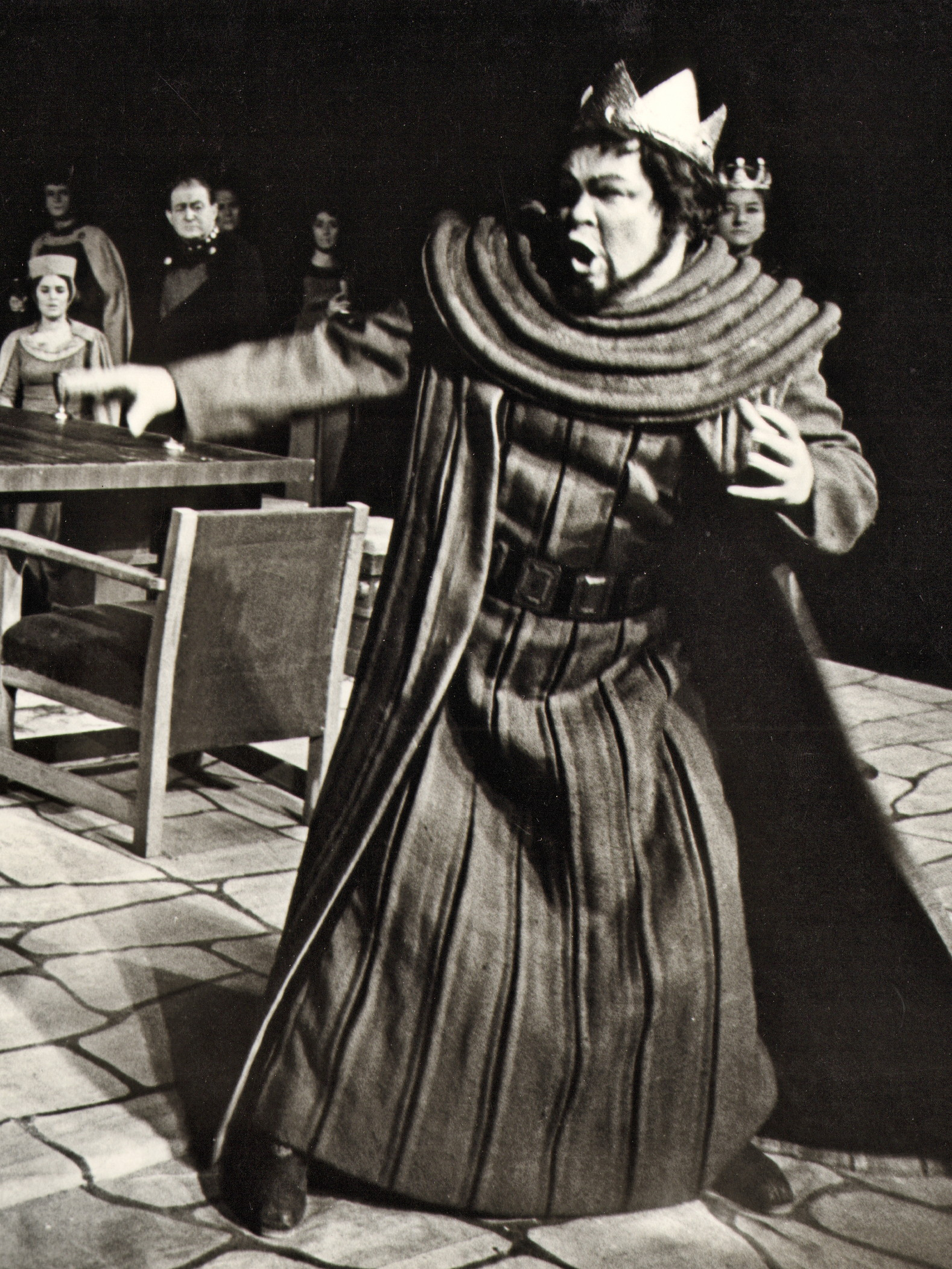
Hofmann in the title role of Verdi's Macbeth, 1973

Hofmann played over 100 roles, the following is a selection:

- Pizarro in Fidelio by Beethoven
- Escamillo in Carmen by Georges Bizet
- Titel role in Einstein by Paul Dessau
- Konz in Der arme Konrad by Jean Kurt Forest
- Graf Eberbach in Der Wildschütz, van Bett in Zar und Zimmermann by Albert Lortzing
- Title role in Don Giovanni, Graf Almaviva in The Marriage of Figaro, Osmin in Die Entführung aus dem Serail by Mozart
- Tonio in Pagliacci by Ruggero Leoncavallo together with his son
- Pope in The Fair at Sorochyntsi, title role in Boris Godunov by Mussorgski
- Marcel in La bohème, title role in Gianni Schicchi, Baron Scarpia in Tosca by Giacomo Puccini
- Sir Morosus in Die schweigsame Frau, Graf Waldner and Mandryka in Arabella, 5. Jew and Jochanaan in Salome, Faninal in Der Rosenkavalier by Richard Strauss
- Title role in Rigoletto, Amonasro in Aida, King Philipp in Don Carlos, Pistol and Sir John Falstaff in Falstaff, René Graf Ankarström in Un ballo in maschera, Georg Germont in La traviata, title role in Macbeth, title role in Nabucco, Jago in Otello, Don Carlo de Vargas in La forza del destino by Giuseppe Verdi
- Hans Sachs in Die Meistersinger von Nürnberg, Holländer in Der fliegende Holländer, Telramund in Lohengrin, Wolfram von Eschenbach in Tannhäuser, Wotan in Die Walküre by Richard Wagner
- Cuno and Kaspar in Der Freischütz by Carl Maria von Weber

== Direction ==
As a director, Hofmann worked on over 50 productions from 1963 onwards, the following is a selection:

- Fra Diavolo by Auber
- Die Verurteilung des Lukullus Paul Dessau
- Der arme Konrad by Jean Kurt Forest
- Die Spieldose and Esther by Robert Hanell
- List und Liebe (La vera costanza) by Joseph Haydn
- Le nozze di Figaro by Wolfgang Amadeus Mozart
- Arabella and Der Rosenkavalier by Richard Strauss
- Optimistische Tragödie by Vsevolod Vishnevsky
- Schwanda the Bagpiper by Jaromír Weinberger
- La traviata, Macbeth Giuseppe Verdi
- Der fliegende Holländer, Lohengrin, Die Meistersinger von Nürnberg, Das Rheingold, Rienzi, Tannhäuser and Die Walküre by Richard Wagner
- Levins Mühle and Der Schuhu und die fliegende Prinzessin by Udo Zimmermann

Guest productions took place among others

- at the Landestheater Altenburg with Die Entführung aus dem Serail by Mozart
- at the City Theatre in České Budějovice with Der Freischütz by Weber and Der fliegende Holländer by Wagner

== Awards ==
- Kammersänger 1967.
- Verdienstmedaille der DDR 1974.
- Max Reger Prize 1975.
- Patriotic Order of Merit in Bronze 1984.

== Membership ==
- Honorary member of the German Richard Wagner Society, Bayreuth (awarded on 6 October 2007)

== Publications ==
- Günther Hofmann (10 May 1953). Das Volk in Boris Godunow – Abschlussarbeit im Hauptfach Operngesang für Staatsexamen.
- — (22 April 1953). Die Entwicklung der russischen Musik im 19. Jahrhundert zu einer Nationalkunst – Abschlussarbeit im Fach Musikgeschichte für Staatsexamen.
- with Horst Arnold (2012). Chronik des Meininger Opernchores. Meininger Theater.
- — (November 1997). "Ratschläge für einen modernen Opernregisseur". Mitteilungen der Deutschen Richard-Wagner-Gesellschaft. 24/25. Bayreuth: 17 ff.
- — (November 2001). "Der Meininger "Ring"". Mitteilungen der Deutschen Richard-Wagner-Gesellschaft. 40/41. Bayreuth: 3 ff.
- — (November 2002). "'Von der Meistersinger hold seligen Kunst' – Erfahrungen und Bekenntnisse eines alten Opernsängers (I)". Mitteilungen der Deutschen Richard-Wagner-Gesellschaft. 44/45. Bayreuth: 10–12.
- — (June 2003). "'Von der Meistersinger hold seligen Kunst' – Erfahrungen und Bekenntnisse eines alten Opernsängers (II)". Mitteilungen der Deutschen Richard-Wagner-Gesellschaft. 46/47. Bayreuth: 10–13.
