= Size Matters (disambiguation) =

Size Matters is an album by the band Helmet.

Size Matters may also refer to:

- Cultural and sexual perceptions of the size of the human penis
- "Size Matters (Someday)", a hit country song recorded by Joe Nichols
- "Size Matters" (Charmed), a 2001 American television episode
- "Size Matters" (Coupling), a 2000 British television episode
- Size Matters, the second issue of the comic book M. Rex
- "Size Matters", a 2004 song by Natasha Bedingfield from Unwritten
- Ratchet & Clank: Size Matters, a video game for PSP and PS2
