= Das Wespennest =

Weekly satirical magazine in Germany (1946–1949)

- Categories: Satirical magazine
- Frequency: Weekly
- Founder: Wolfgang Bechtle
- Founded: 1946
- Final issue: 1949
- Country: Germany
- Based in: Stuttgart
- Language: German
- ISSN: 2626-0409
- OCLC: 11025805

Das Wespennest (German: The Wasp's Nest) was a weekly satirical magazine published in Stuttgart, Germany, in the period 1946–1949. Its subtitle was Politisch-satirische Wochen-Zeitschrift. It was one of the first magazines which were launched shortly after World War II.

== History and profile ==
Das Wespennest was established by the German writer Wolfgang Bechtle in Stuttgart in 1946. It was published in Stuttgart on a weekly basis. Das Wespennest adopted a moderate political stance. Its contributors included Thaddäus Troll and Hans-Frieder Willmann. The circulation of magazine was nearly 35,000 copies per week. It folded in 1949.
