= The House in Montevideo (1951 film) =

1951 film

- Directed by: Curt Goetz; Valérie von Martens
- Written by: Curt Goetz (play); Hans Domnick
- Produced by: Hans Domnick
- Starring: Curt Goetz; Valérie von Martens; Albert Florath; Lia Eibenschütz
- Cinematography: Werner Krien
- Music by: Franz Grothe
- Production company: Domnick Filmproduktion
- Distributed by: Herzog Film
- Release date: 8 November 1951
- Running time: 106 minutes
- Country: West Germany
- Language: German

The House in Montevideo (German: Das Haus in Montevideo) is a 1951 West German comedy film directed by Curt Goetz and Valérie von Martens and starring Goetz, von Martens, Albert Florath and Lia Eibenschütz. It is an adaptation of Goetz's 1945 comic play The House in Montevideo. Goetz and von Martens had frequently played the lead parts on the stage.

It was shot at the Göttingen Studios and on location at Cuxhaven and the Uruguayan capital Montevideo. The film's sets were designed by the art director Emil Hasler.

The play was later adapted into another film of the same title in 1963.

== Cast ==
- Curt Goetz as Professor Traugott Nägler
- Valérie von Martens as Marianne Nägler
- Albert Florath as Pastor Riesling
- Lia Eibenschütz as Madame de la Rocco
- John Mylong as lawyer
- Ruth Niehaus as Atlanta Nägler
- Eckart Dux as Herbert Kraft
- Rudolf Reiff as Mayor
- Ingeborg Körner as Carmencita
- Lope Rica as Belinda
- Andrea Perkams as Marta
- Günther Vogt as Parsifal Nägler
- J. von Felbert as Lohengrin

== Bibliography ==
- Bergfelder, Tim & Bock, Hans-Michael. The Concise Cinegraph: Encyclopedia of German. Berghahn Books, 2009.
- Fenner, Angelica. Race Under Reconstruction in German Cinema: Robert Stemmle's Toxi. University of Toronto Press, 2011.
