= People Will Talk =

1951 film by Joseph L. Mankiewicz

- Theatrical release poster
- Directed by: Joseph L. Mankiewicz
- Written by: Joseph L. Mankiewicz
- Based on: Frauenarzt Dr. med. Hiob Prätorius; 1932 play by Curt Goetz
- Produced by: Darryl F. Zanuck
- Starring: Cary Grant; Jeanne Crain; Finlay Currie; Hume Cronyn; Walter Slezak; Sidney Blackmer; Basil Ruysdael; Katherine Locke
- Cinematography: Milton Krasner
- Edited by: Barbara McLean
- Music by: Alfred Newman (musical direction)
- Distributed by: Twentieth Century-Fox
- Release date: August 29, 1951
- Running time: 110 minutes
- Country: United States
- Language: English
- Box office: $2.1 million (U.S./Canadian rentals)

People Will Talk is a 1951 American romantic comedy-drama film written and directed by Joseph L. Mankiewicz, produced by Darryl F. Zanuck and released by Twentieth Century-Fox. The screenplay is based on the play Frauenarzt Dr. med. Hiob Prätorius by Curt Goetz, which had previously been adapted for the screen in the German film Doctor Praetorius (1950). The film stars Cary Grant, Jeanne Crain, Hume Cronyn, Finlay Currie, Walter Slezak and Sidney Blackmer.

Mankiewicz's screenplay was nominated for the Writers Guild of America Award for Best Written Comedy.

== Plot ==
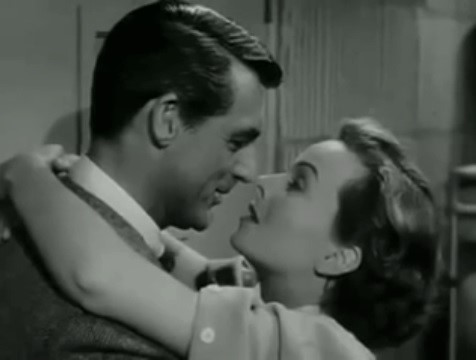
Cary Grant and Jeanne Crain

Physician Noah Praetorius teaches at a medical school and has founded a clinic dedicated to treating patients humanely and holistically. Dr. Rodney Elwell, a colleague who dislikes Praetorius's unorthodox but effective methods, has hired a detective to investigate Praetorius. Mr. Shunderson, Praetorius's mysterious friend, rarely leaves his side and possesses a deep, intuitive understanding of human and animal nature.

After student Deborah Higgins faints during an anatomy presentation, Praetorius suggests she see a doctor, which she does, and he later receives her lab results and informs her that she is pregnant. Deborah is upset by the news, as she is unmarried. She will not reveal the father of her unborn child and fears that the news would be too much for her own father to bear. In a hallway near Praetorius's office, she shoots herself but is not seriously injured.

After successfully operating on Deborah, Praetorius tries to calm her by telling her that the results of her pregnancy test were mistaken and that she really is not pregnant. However, she has fallen in love with him and becomes upset at her own embarrassing behavior. Deborah flees the clinic.

Praetorius and Shunderson visit Deborah's father Arthur on his farm. Arthur thinks that his daughter's injury occurred when she burned herself with a curling iron. Deborah and Praetorius hide Deborah's shooting incident from her father, who is a failure in life and lives unhappily as a dependent of his stingy brother. Deborah is his only pride in life, which might become intolerable for him with a baby to support and his daughter's reputation ruined.

While showing Praetorius the farm, Deborah admits her love for him. She wonders why he is visiting and suspects that he is attracted to her. After she seductively interrogates him, they share a passionate kiss. They are soon married and Arthur comes to live with them. Deborah discovers that she is pregnant and assumes that the baby is her husband's, but Praetorius informs her that she had been pregnant all along. She fears that he married her out of pity, but Noah convinces her that he really did fall in love with her.

After his detective discovers that Shunderson was once convicted of murder, Elwell demands a misconduct hearing against Praetorius. Deborah confronts Elwell about the vicious gossip concerning her husband, and Elwell presents her with a document laying the charges against Praetorius, which she takes to him.

At the hearing, Praetorius explains that he started his career in a small town by opening a butcher shop as a front for his medical practice because the townspeople mistrusted doctors. He was forced to leave town after his maid discovered his medical degree. Shunderson proceeds to tell his own story to the members of the hearing. He had been sentenced to death for murder but survived his hanging. When he awakened, he was lying on a table in front of Praetorius, then a medical student examining what he believed to be a cadaver. Praetorius kept Shunderson's survival a secret and Shunderson became Praetorius's devoted friend. The chairman concludes the hearing in Praetorius's favor and Elwell walks away alone and discredited.

Elwell had purposefully arranged for Praetorius's misconduct hearing to be scheduled for the same time as the student/faculty orchestra concert. After the hearing, Deborah, her father and Shunderson watch Praetorius conducting the finale of Brahms's Academic Festival Overture, "Gaudeamus igitur".

== Cast ==
- Cary Grant as Dr. Noah Praetorius
- Jeanne Crain as Deborah Praetorius
- Finlay Currie as Shunderson
- Hume Cronyn as Prof. Rodney Elwell
- Walter Slezak as Prof. Lyonel Barker
- Sidney Blackmer as Arthur Higgins
- Basil Ruysdael as Dean Lyman Brockwell
- Katherine Locke as Miss James
- Parley Baer as Toy Store Salesman (uncredited)
- Lawrence Dobkin as Business Manager (uncredited)
- Bess Flowers as Concert audience member (uncredited)
- Margaret Hamilton as Sarah Pickett, the housekeeper (uncredited)
- Sam Harris as Concertgoer (uncredited)
- Stuart Holmes as Board member (uncredited)
- Billy House as Coonan (uncredited)
- Jack Kelly as Student in classroom (uncredited)
- Will Wright as John Higgins (uncredited)

== Production ==
The film's working title was The Story of Dr. Praetorius. Anne Baxter had been cast in the lead female role but withdrew when she became pregnant. Jeanne Crain was announced as Baxter's replacement in March 1951.

== Music ==
The film's score consists of two classical pieces: Johannes Brahms' Academic Festival Overture and Richard Wagner's Prize Song, adapted and conducted by Alfred Newman.

== Release ==
People Will Talk was previewed at the Grauman's Chinese Theatre on July 19, 1951, which was attended by the film's stars Cary Grant and Jeanne Crain, along with many other prominent film stars. It was released in general theaters on August 29.

== Reception ==
A. H. Weiler of The New York Times wrote: "[T]his merry mélange of medicine, mystery and what must be the Mankiewicz philosophical code takes itself seriously as to avoid injecting as many chuckles as possible within the framework of an adult story. ... Despite the fact that Mr. Mankiewicz's script is in error sometimes—atomic scientists are using atomic energy to make people well—it does make its points clearly and with humor. It is biased, of course, and it takes too long to reach its conclusions. But 'People Will Talk' does have something to say and it does so with erudition and high comedy, a compound that is vastly entertaining and rewarding."

Philip K. Scheuer of the Los Angeles Times called the film "occasionally daring and, by conventional movie standards, even shocking". He further wrote: "As Mankiewicz's mouthpiece, Grant manages to get some iconoclastic-sounding things said—on doctors, patients, socialized medicine and other matters—so that listeners will have the same feeling of giddy superiority they enjoyed in 'All About Eve.' At least Joe credits them with being able to understand English. ... But 'People Will Talk' is primarily witty—and witty people will talk. They are witty even in the presence of the deceased and at some cost to themselves, though ultimately the actors playing them will win you over."

Harrison's Reports called the film "an excellent romantic comedy-drama, one that has the rare quality of holding an audience captivated from start to finish because of the deft characterizations, the sparkling dialogue, and the warmth of the central character". William Brogdon of Variety wrote the film "was a well-polished presentation, slickly cast and smoothly turned out." Time magazine applauded Cary Grant for playing "to perfection the man who refuses to worry about anyone's opinion but his own" while Jeanne Crain "displays both intelligence and charm."
