= The Unexcused Hour (1937 film) =

1937 film

- Directed by: E.W. Emo
- Written by: Karl Peter Gillmann
- Based on: The Unexcused Hour by Alexander Turmayer
- Produced by: E.W. Emo
- Starring: Anton Edthofer; Hans Moser; Dagny Servaes
- Cinematography: Eduard Hoesch
- Edited by: Else Baum
- Music by: Paul Hühn; Robert Stolz
- Production company: Emofilm
- Distributed by: Tobis-Sascha Film
- Release date: 24 September 1937
- Running time: 91 minutes
- Country: Austria
- Language: German

The Unexcused Hour (German: Unentschuldigte Stunde) is a 1937 Austrian comedy film directed by E.W. Emo and starring Anton Edthofer, Hans Moser and Dagny Servaes. It was shot at the Sievering Studios in Vienna. The film's sets were designed by the art director Fritz Maurischat. It was remade as a 1957 film of the same title directed by Willi Forst.

== Cast ==
- Anton Edthofer as Dr. Karl Henning - Professor
- Hans Moser as Anton Riedel - Postamtsvorstand
- Dagny Servaes as Sophie - seine Gattin
- Gusti Huber as Käte - beider Tochter
- Gusti Wolf as Thilde Schreiber - Kätes Freundin
- Theo Lingen as Fritz Ortmann - Lehramtskandidat
- Werner Finck as Dr. Rudolf Henning - Rechtsanwalt
- Genia Nikolaieva as Vera - seine Gattin
- Lina Woiwode as Lina - Köchin bei Riedel
- Tibor Halmay as Martin - Diener bei Prof. Henning

== Bibliography ==
- Dassanowsky, Robert. Screening Transcendence: Film Under Austrofascism and the Hollywood Hope, 1933–1938. Indiana University Press, 2018
- Frank, Stefanie Mathilde. Wiedersehen im Wirtschaftswunder: Remakes von Filmen aus der Zeit des Nationalsozialismus in der Bundesrepublik 1949–1963. V&R Unipress, 2017.
