= Annemarie Hase =

German actress and cabaret artist

- Born: 14 June 1900; Berlin, German Empire
- Died: 22 February 1971 (aged 70); West Berlin, West Germany
- Other name: Annita Hirsch
- Occupations: Actress, singer
- Years active: 1923–1971 (film)

Annemarie Hase (1900–1971) was a German actress and cabaret artist. She emerged as a star during the Weimar Republic, but because she was Jewish she faced increasing persecution following the Nazi takeover in 1933. In 1936 she went into exile in Britain, where she remained for the next decade. She was involved with various exile groups, and was employed by the BBC (for the German Service) during the Second World War where she worked alongside Bruno Adler.

Following the Allied victory over the Nazis, and occupation of Germany she returned to Berlin. In 1947 she appeared in the rubble film And the Heavens Above Us alongside Hans Albers and Lotte Koch. She forged a career as a character actress, appearing in a number of East German films. She was known for her Socialist political views.

== Filmography ==
Year	Title	Role	Notes
1923	Mysteries of a Barbershop	Moras' Geliebte	Short
1925	Nameless Heroes		Short
1930	Marriage in Name Only	Rosa Schulz	
1931	The Night Without Pause	Anna, Dienstmädchen	
1934	Love Conquers All		
1947	And the Heavens Above Us	Frau Burghardt	
1948	1-2-3 Corona	Frau Schmittchen	
1948	Morituri	Mutter Simon	
1949	The Great Mandarin		
1949	Kätchen für alles	Frau Schulze	
1950	The Axe of Wandsbek	Frau Schmermund	
1951	Zugverkehr unregelmäßig		
1954	Pole Poppenspäler	Kröpellieschen	
1957	Lissy	Frau Kaluweit	
1957	Der Fackelträger	Ziebusch	
1957	Gejagt bis zum Morgen	Mutter Bühnemann	
1959	Before the Lightning Strikes	Tante Else	

== Bibliography ==
- Wallace, Ian (ed.) German-Speaking Exiles in Great Britain. Rodopi, 1999.
- Shandley, Robert R. Rubble Films: German Cinema in the Shadow of the Third Reich. Temple University Press, 2001.
