= Liverpool Institute High School for Boys =

Grammar school in Liverpool, UK

Coordinates: 53°23′58.4″N 2°58′20.3″W

- Liverpool, Merseyside; England

Information
- Type: Grammar school
- Established: 1825
- Closed: 1985
- Local authority: Liverpool
- Gender: Boys
- Age: 11 to 18
- Website: http://www.liobians.org

Liverpool Institute High School for Boys
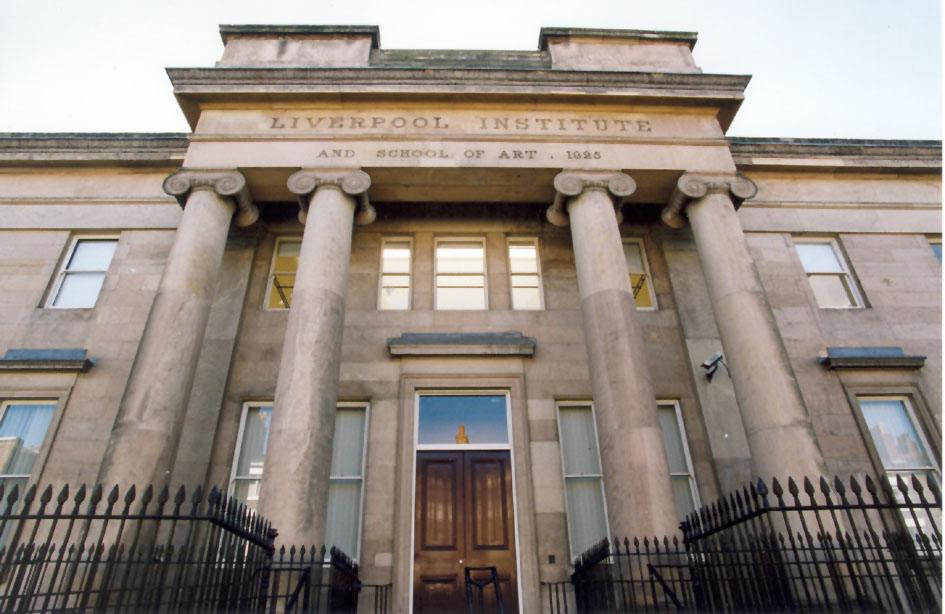
- LIPA
- Interactive map of the Liverpool Institute High School for Boys area

General information
- Location: Liverpool, England
- Construction started: 1825

The Liverpool Institute High School for Boys was an all-boys grammar school in the English port city of Liverpool.

The school had its origins in 1825 but occupied different premises while the money was found to build a dedicated building on Mount Street. The institute was first known as the Liverpool Mechanics' School of Arts. In 1832 the name was shortened to the Liverpool Mechanics' Institution. The façade of the listed building, the entrance hall and modified school hall remain after substantial internal reconstruction was completed in the early 1990s.

== School history in brief ==
Its initial primary purpose as a mechanics' institute (one of many established about this time throughout the country) was to provide educational opportunities, mainly through evening classes, for working men. Lectures for the general public were also provided of wide interest covering topics ranging from Arctic exploration to Shakespeare and philosophy. Luminaries like Charles Dickens, Anthony Trollope and Ralph Waldo Emerson delivered talks and readings in the main lecture hall (now the architecturally restructured Sir Paul McCartney Auditorium of LIPA).

By 1840 the Institution offered evening classes, lectures, a library and a boys' lower and upper school. By the 1850s a formal art school was evolving from the evening classes and in 1856 this diversity was recognised by another name change – The Liverpool Institute and School of Arts.

A girls' school was founded and opened in 1844 under the name Liverpool Institute High School for Girls. It was housed in a merchant's mansion across the street from the boys' school in Blackburne House provided by the generosity of George Holt and which was later (1872) donated to the school by his family in his memory. The school was one of the first which was open to the public in the country established exclusively for the education of girls. In 1925 former alumni Sir Frederick Morton Radcliffe, founding member of Liverpool Anglican Cathedral established the Sir Frederick Radcliffe Prize for Elocution for pupils.

In 1905 the Liverpool City Council took over the management of the secondary schools when the LI Board of Governors presented the school and assets to the city. From then until its closure in 1985, the school was formally known as The Liverpool Institute High School for Boys or more familiarly as The Institute or The Inny to its pupils.

It was an English grammar school for boys ages 11 to 18 with an excellent academic reputation built up over more than a century. Its list of scholarships and places at Oxford and Cambridge runs to some 300 names – in addition to distinctions gained at the University of Liverpool and many other prominent British universities. The school was a true measure of Liverpool's intellectual capital, and its old boys could and can be found in later life in many fields of professional distinction including the law, the Church, armed forces, politics, academia, government and colonial administration as well as in trade and commerce.

In the 1950s, two of the future Beatles, Paul McCartney and George Harrison, were educated at the school.

== Closure of the school ==
The school was closed by the city council in 1985. The Labour Party nationally opposed grammar schools – see Anthony Crosland's Circular of September 1965 required that Local Authorities bring forward schemes for comprehensive secondary education. As grammar school pupils were selected by examination at age 11, there was a long-standing push towards 'comprehensive schools' (as non-selective schools were known) from that party when it took majority control of the City Council in 1983. Demand for secondary school places in the city had also dropped precipitously and there was a huge oversupply of school space as Liverpool's population contracted during the severe economic recession of the early 1980s.

The Deputy Leader of the Labour (Militant) Group on Council at the time was a former LI schoolboy Derek Hatton who had left without academic distinction in 1964 and with strong feelings of dislike towards the school. However the man who was Chair of the Educational Committee at the time of the decision to close the school was Dominic Brady, whose qualifications for his position amounted to being a former school caretaker.

After closure, the building stood empty and neglected, the roof leaking and the walls crumbling. In 1987 it was announced that the LI Trust (under control of Liverpool Council's Education Department) would grant use of the building and site to a new educational establishment. Paul McCartney had returned to his old school in 1979, when with the band Wings he had played a concert at the Royal Court Theatre, Liverpool. After the school's closure in 1985, McCartney returned one night to reminisce about his school days, while he was writing his Liverpool Oratorio. This visit is captured in Echoes; a DVD which accompanies the Liverpool Oratoria box set. McCartney was determined to save the building somehow and during a conversation with Sir George Martin, the idea of a 'fame school' emerged as Martin was helping Mark Featherstone-Witty start a London secondary school with an innovative curriculum. McCartney and Featherstone-Witty joined forces to create the Liverpool Institute for Performing Arts (LIPA) opening in 1996. The new company took over the Liverpool Institute Trust which had its origins in 1905.

The building was rebuilt (entirely in parts) behind its old façade and re-opened in 1996 under LIPA's name. The new institute is affiliated with Liverpool John Moores University and is no longer a Liverpool secondary school.

== Art school ==
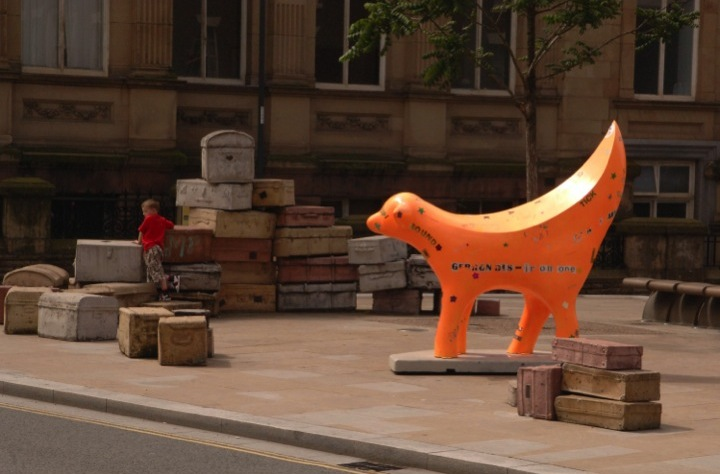
Art School

The city's Art College had its origins as part of the Liverpool Institute. In 1883 a new building housing the School of Art was opened around the corner on Hope Street, adjacent to the principal building housing the High School on Mount Street. The Art College by which it was later known, took in talented students often without formal academic credentials (e.g. John Lennon) and the college eventually became one of the four constituent parts of the Liverpool Polytechnic in 1970 and later in 1992 Liverpool John Moores University (LJMU) with the School of Art and Design being housed in the Art and Design Academy.

== Liverpool Institute and music ==
Music and musical performances were a constant theme throughout the life of the school and the Mount St. building. Annual school Speech Day concerts (held in the fine acoustics of Philharmonic Hall, Liverpool), choirs, the organ, piano, music classes and the singing of daily devotional hymns have echoed around its walls for 170 years and continue to do so at LIPA:

- Neil Aspinall, 1954–1959: Beatles' road manager, managing director of Apple Corp
- Les Chadwick, 1954–1959: member of Gerry and the Pacemakers
- Albert Coates, 1894–1900: Anglo-Russian conductor and composer
- David Ellis: composer and arts administrator
- Lauri de Frece, 1893–1898, singer in musical theatre and actor
- Len Garry, 1954–1959: member of the Quarrymen
- George Harrison, 1954–1959: musician and one of the Beatles. Left without formal qualifications in July 1959 for a job as an assistant electrician at Blacklers department store
- Stan Kelly-Bootle, 1941–1947: mathematics scholar, folk singer and composer.
- John McCabe, 1950 to 1957: prolific classical music composer
- Sir Paul McCartney, 1953–1960: musician. Having taken O and A levels, and deciding not to apply for teachers' training college, left school in July 1960 for the Beatles' first stay in Hamburg.
- Peter Sissons, 1953–1961, head boy. Presenter of the BBC Nine O'Clock News and BBC Ten O'Clock News between 1993 and 2003, and a newscaster for ITN, on ITV and Channel 4. He was also a former presenter of the BBC's Question Time programme, retiring from the BBC in 2009.
- Mike McCartney, 1955–1961: musician Mike McGear of the Scaffold; brother of Paul McCartney.
- Sir Charles Santley, British baritone
- Ivan Vaughan, a classics sixth former, 1953 to 1960, who introduced Paul McCartney to John Lennon.
- C.W. (Colin) Manley, 1953 to 1959 and D.M. (Don) Andrew, 1953 to 1959 both became part of the Remo Four, a group later managed by Brian Epstein.

== Notable former pupils ==
Name	Joined/left	Born/died	Known for
Francis Neilson-Butters		1867–1961	MP for the Hyde Division of Cheshire 1910–1916. Writer and historian.
Charles, Viscount Wakefield		12 December 1859 – 15 January 1941	English businessman who founded the Castrol lubricants company, was lord mayor of London and was a significant philanthropist.
Sir Walter de Frece		1870–1935	Theatre impresario and MP
Sir Richard Burn		1871–1947	Civil servant, historian and numismatist
Alfred James Ewart		1872–1937	Professor of Botany and Plant Physiology in the University of Melbourne from 1906 to 1921
John Hay		1873–1959	former president of the Royal Microscopical Society, and former professor of medicine at the University of Liverpool
Franklin Dyall		1874–1950	Actor
Prof Charles Glover Barkla		1877–1944	Nobel Prize in Physics 1917 "for his discovery of the characteristic Röntgen radiation of the elements", Wheatstone Professor of Physics from 1909 to 1913 at King's College London, and discovered most properties of X-ray scattering, fluorescence, polarisation, and transmission through matter.
Sydney Silverman	c. 1911–1915	1895–1968	Labour MP from 1935 to 1968 for Nelson and Colne. He brought in a private Member's Bill in 1965 to suspend the death penalty
James Laver		1899–1975	Art historian
Arthur Askey	1911–1916	1900–1982	Comedian and broadcaster.
Sir Malcolm Knox		1900–80	Professor of Moral Philosophy from 1936 to 1953 at the University of St Andrews, and Principal of the university from 1953 to 1966
Sir Frank Francis		1901–1988	Director of the British Museum, 1959–1968
Lindley M. Fraser		1904–63	Jaffrey Professor of Political Economy from 1935 to 1940 at the University of Aberdeen, Head of German and Austrian Services at the BBC from 1946 to 1963
Frank Redington		1906–84	Head Boy 1925; Cambridge University (Wrangler); Chief Actuary of Prudential Insurance 1951–1968; Winner of the Gold Medal of the Institute of Actuaries in honour of "actuarial work of pre-eminent importance".
Prof William Kneale		1906–90	White's Professor of Moral Philosophy at the University of Oxford, 1960–6. Author of Probability and Induction
Donald MacAlister		1907–29	Scottish physician who was Principal and Vice-Chancellor and, later, Chancellor of the University of Glasgow
Alan Robertson		1920–89	Chemist. Animal breeding and genetics
Alan Durband	1938–1944	1927–93	Pupil who returned as a teacher, one of the founders of the Liverpool Everyman Theatre and the New Shakespeare Theatre, Liverpool
Ronald Oxburgh, Baron Oxburgh	1944–1952	1934–	Chair of Royal Dutch Shell PLC, 2003 to 2005.
Peter Sissons	1953–1961	1942–2019	News broadcaster
Paul McCartney	1953–1958	1942–	The Beatles, Wings
George Harrison	1954–1959	1943–2001	The Beatles, Traveling Wilburys
Steve Norris	1956–1963	1945–	MP for Oxford East, 1983–1987; Epping Forest, 1988–1997. Conservative candidate for London mayoralty, 2000 and 2004.
Bill Kenwright	1957–1964	1945–2023	Theatre impresario

== Headmasters ==
=== 19th century ===
- Robert Landers (University of Edinburgh), 1828–31, Headmaster, 1835–36; died in May 1836.
- Alexander Sinclair MacIlveen Teacher, 1840–42, then Head of Commercial School (1842–1854), then Head of the Liverpool Mechanics' Institute.
- William Hunter, M.A., LL.D. (Glasgow)- Head of High School of the Liverpool Mechanics' Institute, 1842–45.
- William Ballantyne Hodgson, (Glasgow) – Head master, 1845–47. Left for Chorlton High School, Manchester, 1847–48. Later Prof. Economic Science, University of Edinburgh, 1871–80.
- James England, (Dublin, Trinity College) – Headmaster, Liverpool Mechanics' Institute, 1847–49.
- William Ihne, (former Royal Protestant Gymnasium, Elberfeld, Rhenish Prussia) English, Classics – Headmaster, Liverpool Mechanics Institute, 1849–54.
- Alexander Sinclair MacIlveen, Teacher, 1840–42, then Head of Commercial School (1842–1854), then – Head of the reunited School, 1854 to death in October 1861.
- Joshua Jones (Oxford, Lincoln College). Mathematics. – Head 1862 to 1865. (Born in 1831, died 1904.)
- John Sephton, M.A. (“Late Fellow of St. John's College, Cambridge”). Headmaster 1866–1889. Born 1837; died in 1915. Reader in Icelandic, University of Liverpool, 1895–1910.
- Alfred Hughes, (Oxford, Corpus Christi College). Mathematics. Headmaster, 1890 to 1896. Later Registrar, University of Manchester (born in 1860, married Hester, daughter of Alfred Booth; died 1940.
- William Charles Fletcher(Cambridge, St. John's College) CB (1896–1904) – Headmaster of the reunited school, President from 1939 to 1945 of the Mathematical Association, died in 1959

=== 20th century ===
- Henry Victor Weisse (name changed to Henry Victor Whitehouse in 1917), B.A. (Open Exhibitioner, Oxford, Christ Church) (1904–1923) – Headmaster. Died in July 1936.
- Frederick W. H. Groom, M.A. (Cambridge, St. John's College, Jesus College?) (1894–1917) Vice-Principal (1917–1932 ret.) Acting Headmaster 1923–24. Died in Jan. 1956.
- Henry Herbert Symonds, M.A. (Oxford, Oriel College) – Headmaster (1924–1935). Author of Walking in the Lake District, 1933; Afforestation in the Lake District. Born in 1885 – Died 28 December 1958.
- John Robert Edwards MA (Oxford, University College) Headmaster (1935–1961) born in 1897 at Rhyl; died on 8 January 1992 at the age of 95.
- Malcolm Pasco Smith, M.A. (Cambridge, Trinity) Head master (1961–1965)
- Dennis Booth, B.A. (Liverpool) (1942–1972) Vice Principal (1957–1965); Head master (1965–1972 ret.).
- J. Gareth Rogers, M.A., B.Litt. (Oxford, Jesus College) (1950–1977; – Vice-Principal, 1965–1972; – Head master (1972–1977 died).
- Bertram (Bert) L. Parker, BSc (Wales, Aberystwyth) (January 1948 – 1982; Head master, 1978–1982 ret.).
- Maurice Devereux, B.A. (Liverpool) (1953–1983; Head master, 1982–1983 ret.).
