= Axiom of equity =

The axiom of equity was proposed by Samuel Clarke, an English philosopher, in the spirit of the ethic of reciprocity.

In his book A Discourse Concerning the Unchangeable Obligations of Natural Religion, and the Truth and Certainty of the Christian Revelation, Clarke wrote:

Whatever I judge reasonable or unreasonable for another to do to me; that, by the same judgment, I declare reasonable or unreasonable, that I in the like case should do for him.

Hastings Rashdall, in his 1907 book The Theory of Good and Evil, restated the axiom as:

One man's good is of as much intrinsic worth as the like good of another.
