= Erich Fried =

Austrian-born poet, writer and translator

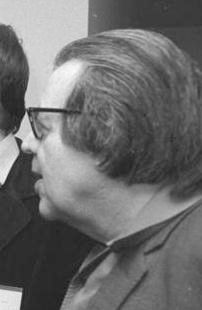
Fried in 1981

Erich Fried (6 May 1921 – 22 November 1988) was an Austrian-born poet, writer, and translator. He initially became known to a broader public in both Germany and Austria for his political poetry, and later for his love poems. As a writer, he mostly wrote plays and short novels. He also translated works by different English writers from English into German, most notably works by William Shakespeare.

He was born in Vienna, Austria, but fled to England after the annexation of Austria by Nazi Germany in 1938. He settled in London and adopted British nationality in 1949. His first official visit back to Vienna was in 1962.

== Biography ==
Born to Jewish parents Nelly and Hugo Fried in Vienna, he was a child actor and from an early age wrote political essays and poetry. He fled to London after his father was murdered by the Gestapo after the Anschluss (i.e. annexation of Austria) by Nazi Germany.

During World War II, he did casual work as a librarian and a factory hand. He arranged also for his mother to leave Nazi-occupied Austria, as well as helping many other Jews to come to the UK. He joined Young Austria, a left-wing emigrant youth movement, but left in 1943 in protest of its growing Stalinist tendencies. In 1944, he married Maria Marburg, shortly before the birth of his son Hans. During the same year, his first volume of poetry was published. He separated from Maria in 1946.

Fried's German translation of Masefield's Good Friday was broadcast on the BBC German Service in 1951. He divorced Maria in 1952. In the same year, he married Nan Spence Eichner, with whom he had two children; David (born 1958) and Katherine (born 1961). From 1952 to 1968, he worked as a political commentator for the BBC German Service. In his annual review for 1961, Lindley Fraser wrote of him that 'Mr.Fried's contribution to the Soviet Zone programme is probably the most valuable single one we have'. He translated works by Shakespeare, T. S. Eliot, and Dylan Thomas. In 1962, he returned to Vienna for the first time. Erich and Nan divorced in 1965. In 1965, he married for a third time, wedding Catherine Boswell with whom he had three children; Petra (born 1965), Klaus, and Thomas (born 1969).

He published several volumes of poetry as well as radio plays and a novel. His work was sometimes controversial, including attacks on the Zionist movement and support for left-wing causes. His work was mainly published in the West, but in 1969, a selection of his poetry was published in the GDR poetry series Poesiealbum, and his Dylan Thomas translations were published in that same series in 1974. The composer Hans Werner Henze set two of Fried's poems for his song-cycle Voices (1973).

In 1982, he regained his Austrian nationality, though he also retained the British nationality he had adopted in 1949. He died of intestinal cancer in Baden-Baden, West Germany, in 1988 and is buried in Kensal Green Cemetery, London.

An Austrian literary prize is named in his honour, more specifically the Erich Fried Prize.

== Works ==
- Drei Gebete aus London (Three Prayers from London), 1945
- Ein Soldat und ein Mädchen (A Soldier and a Girl), 1960
- Reich der Steine, 1963
- Warngedichte (Warning Poems), 1964
- Überlegungen, 1964
- Kinder und Narren, 1965
- und Vietnam und (and Vietnam and), 1966
- Anfechtungen, 1967
- Die Beine der größeren Lügen, 1969
- Poesiealbum, 1969
- Unter Nebenfeinden, 1970
- Die Freiheit den Mund aufzumachen, 1972
- Höre Israel, 1974
- So kam ich unter die Deutschen, 1977
- 100 Gedichte ohne Vaterland, 1978
- Liebesgedichte (Love Poems), 1979
- Es ist was es ist (It is what it is), 1983
- Um Klarheit, 1985
- Mitunter sogar Lachen, 1986

== Translations of Erich Fried's Works into English ==
- Arden Must Die: An Opera on the Death of the Wealthy Arden of Faversham. (Original title: Arden muss sterben). Translated by Geoffrey Skelton. London: Schott 1967; New York: Associated Music Publishers 1967
- Last Honours. A selection of poems translated by Georg Rapp. London: Turret 1968
- On Pain of Seeing. A selection of poems translated by Georg Rapp. London: Rapp and Whiting 1969; Chicago: Swallow Press 1969
- 100 Poems Without a Country (identical in most parts with the original 100 Gedichte ohne Vaterland). Translated by Stuart Hood and Georg Rapp. London: John Calder 1978; New York: Red Dust 1980
- Love Poems. Bilingual edition. A selection of poems from Liebesgedichte (1979) and Es ist was es ist (1983), translated by Stuart Hood. London: Calder Publication Limited Riverrun Press 1991. New, revised edition Alma Classics Ltd, 2011
- Children and Fools. A selection of 34 stories translated by Martin Chalmers. London: Serpent's Tail 1993

There are as well translations of single poems in different anthologies.

== See also ==
- List of Austrian writers
