= Erich Schellow =

German actor (1915–1995)

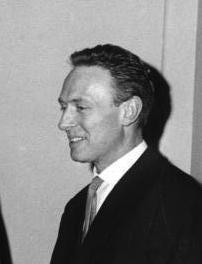
- Schellow in 1960.
- Born: 27 February 1915; Berlin, German Empire
- Died: 25 November 1995 (aged 80); Berlin, Germany
- Occupation: Actor
- Years active: 1947-1987 (film & TV)

Erich Schellow (1915–1995) was a German stage, film and television actor. In the late 1960s he portrayed Sherlock Holmes in a series of adaptations of Arthur Conan Doyle's stories for German television, alongside Paul Edwin Roth as Dr. Watson.

== Filmography ==
Year	Title	Role	Notes
1947	In Those Days	Karl / Rahmenhandlung	
1954	Portrait of an Unknown Woman	Walter	
1954	A Girl from Paris		
1954	Three from Variety	Alexis	
1955	Secrets of the City	Rudolf Thomas, Engineer	
1955	The Plot to Assassinate Hitler	Evangelischer Pfarrer / Narrator	
1955	Hotel Adlon	Louis Adlon	
1956	Before Sundown	Wolfgang Clausen	
1956	The Captain from Köpenick	Capt. von Schlettow	
1967	Sherlock Holmes	Sherlock Holmes	

== Bibliography ==
- Goble, Alan. The Complete Index to Literary Sources in Film. Walter de Gruyter, 1999.
