= Bruno Adler =

German art historian and writer

Bruno Maria Adler
- Born: 14 October 1888; Carlsbad, Bohemia, Austria-Hungary
- Died: 27 December 1968 (aged 80)
- Known for: Art History
- Movement: Bauhaus

Bruno Maria Adler (14 October 1888 – 27 December 1968) was a German art historian and writer. He taught art history in Weimar and lectured about it at the Bauhaus. Adler fled Germany after the Nazis seized power and immigrated to England, where he worked first at a German-Jewish refugee school in Kent, then as a writer with the German Service of BBC Radio.

== Early life and education ==
Adler was born to Jewish parents in Carlsbad, Bohemia. His mother was Therese Adler (née Hirsch) and his father was Moritz Adler, editor and critic with the social democratic newspaper, Volkswille and an elected representative. Adler attended gymnasium in Carlsbad and Prague.

From 1910 to 1916, he studied art history, the history of literature, and philosophy at the University of Vienna, the University of Erlangen, and the Ludwig-Maximilians-Universität München, acquiring his doctorate in 1917 with a dissertation on the origin and beginning of woodcuts. From 1919 to 1924, Adler lectured on art history at the Bauhaus, and between 1920 and 1930, he taught art history at the Weimar Saxon-Grand Ducal Art School. His association with Johannes Itten, who also taught at the Bauhaus, led to him publishing and editing Utopia: Dokumente der Wirklichkeit ("Utopia: Documents of Reality"). This included translations by Adler from the Rigveda and work by Nicholas of Cusa. During this period, Adler also edited writings by Adalbert Stifter and Matthias Claudius.

== Exile in England ==
After the Nazis seized power, Adler was forced to flee to Prague. In 1936, he went to England. Writing under the pseudonymous anagram Urban Roedl, Adler released a biography of Stifter with the publisher Ernst Rowohlt, who was afterwards prohibited by the Nazis from working, having been charged with disguising Jewish writers. From 1936 to 1938, Adler continued to use the pseudonym during World War II and occasionally, after the war.

Adler taught at the New Herrlingen School (also known as Bunce Court), a German-Jewish school founded by Anna Essinger with help from British Quakers. Originally located in Herrlingen, Germany, it was relocated to Kent, England, because of Nazi persecution, where it became a haven for refugees, including both children from the Kindertransports and adults, who joined the staff. Adler's nephew, Gerard Hoffnung, was a pupil at Bunce Court.

=== German Service of the BBC ===
During the war, Adler worked in the German Service of the BBC. Under the guise of literary entertainment, these German-language programs broadcast British propaganda using established native-speaking writers in exile, such as Adler and Robert Lucas, and targeted the average German, who was growing weary of endless war. Listening carried severe penalties in Germany, imprisonment and even death, so the programs were short, between three and seven minutes. Characters had to be easily identifiable, and they had little time to impress the thought of their target audience.

Adler created the satirical "Frau Wernicke", a program broadcast from summer 1940 to January 1944. The lead role, Frau Gertrud Wernicke, was voiced by the German actress and cabaret artist Annemarie Hase, also in exile. The character was a Berlin woman married to a tradesman and World War I veteran. She commented on the shortages plaguing the German populace, the state of the war and she launched subversive tirades against the Nazis, turning them into a laughingstock. Frau Wernicke became one of the most popular programs of the BBC's German Service.

Adler wrote the satirical series "Kurt und Willi" with the Scottish poet Norman Cameron. It featured two characters, a teacher named Kurt Krüger and Willi Schimanski, an official in the German Ministry of Propaganda. So skilled was the character Willi as a propagandist that he was reputedly much admired within the actual Nazi Ministry.

Adler later edited the monthly German-language magazine Neue Auslese aus dem Schrifttum der Gegenwart, published by the US Information Services Division, Central Office of Information in London after the war.

== Personal and legacy ==
Adler's first wife was Margit, née Téry (1892–1977), a painter, graphic designer and student of Johannes Itten. They were married in 1918 and had one son, Florian (1921–1998), an architect and editor. Adler married his second wife, Ilse, née Katz (1890–1974), in 1928.

Adler's personal papers are archived at the German Literature Archive (Deutsches Literaturarchiv) in Marbach am Neckar. Included in the papers is correspondence with Willi Baumeister, Theodor Heuss, Walter Gropius, Itten, Hermann Kasack, Alfred Kubin, Georg Muche and Max Stefl.

In 1958, Adler, again writing as Roedl, reissued his 1936 biography of Stifter and dedicated it to his wife, Ilse Katz. Roedl was also the author of the Adalbert Stifter, monograph, which Adler dedicated to Erich Heller.

== Publications (selected) ==
as Bruno Adler

- Translation of Gustave Flaubert, Die Sage von St. Julian, dem Gastfreien, (Original title: La légende de Saint Julien l'hospitalier) M. Biewald, Weimar(1923)
- Matthias Claudius. Werke, Utopia-Verlag, Weimar (1924)
- Das Weimarer Bauhaus, Bauhaus Archive, Darmstadt (1965)
- (Editor) Utopia: Dokumente der Wirklichkeit, Martin Biewald, Weimar (1921); Kraus reprint, Munich (1980)

as Urban Roedl

- Matthias Claudius: sein Weg und seine Welt, Wolff, Berlin (1934)
- Kampf um Polna (novel), Kacha, Prague (1934), reprinted Polná (1999)
- Adalbert Stifter in Selbstzeugnissen und Bilddokumenten, Rowohlt, Reinbek bei Hamburg (1965)
- Jodel-Franz, (with Billy Dongen). Munich: Ed. Insel-Ton, (1955)
- Adalbert Stifter: Geschichte seines Lebens, Francke, Bern (1958)
- Frau Wernicke: Kommentare einer "Volksjenossin, Uwe Naumann (Ed.), persona verlag, Mannheim (1990)

== Bibliography ==
- Werner Röder, Herbert A. Strauss, Institut für Zeitgeschichte München (publisher.), Biographisches Handbuch der deutschsprachigen Emigration nach 1933. (International biographical dictionary of Central European émigrés 1933–1945.) 4 Volumes, Saur, Munich (1983).
- Joseph Walk (Ed.), Kurzbiographien zur Geschichte der Juden 1918–1945 Leo Baeck Institute, Jerusalem. Munich: Saur (1988) ISBN 3-598-10477-4
- Joachim W. Storck, "Adalbert Stifter im Exil. Urban Roedl (Bruno Adler) als Stifter-Biograph und Stifter-Interpret", in: Johann Lachinger (Ed.), Adalbert Stifter – Studien zu seiner Rezeption und Wirkung, Kolloquium II Schriftenreihe of the Adalbert Stifter Institute, Upper Austria; 40 (2002)
- Ulrike Wendland, Biographisches Handbuch deutschsprachiger Kunsthistoriker im Exil. Leben und Werk der unter dem Nationalsozialismus verfolgten und vertriebenen Wissenschaftler. Saur, Munich (1999) ISBN 3-598-11339-0
