= Anneliese Kaplan =

German actress (1933–2020)

- Born: 12 May 1933; Hamburg, Germany
- Died: 11 August 2020 (aged 87); Westerrönfeld, Germany
- Occupation: Actress
- Years active: 1953–1955 (film)

Anneliese Kaplan (12 May 1933 – 11 August 2020) was a German actress. She was married to the composer Martin Böttcher.

== Selected filmography ==
- The Last Waltz (1953)
- Captain Bay-Bay (1953)
- Sun Over the Adriatic (1954)
- A Girl from Paris (1954)
- The Fisherman from Heiligensee (1955)
- The Abduction of the Sabine Women (1956)

== Bibliography ==
- Wolfgang Jacobsen & Hans Helmut Prinzler. Käutner. Spiess, 1992.
