= The Eternal Mask =

- Directed by: Werner Hochbaum
- Written by: Leo Lapaire (novel); Werner Hochbaum
- Starring: Peter Petersen; Mathias Wieman; Franz Schafheitlin; Tom Kraa
- Cinematography: Oskar Schnirch
- Edited by: Else Baum
- Music by: Anton Profes
- Production company: Progress Film
- Distributed by: Arthur Mayer & Joseph Burstyn (US)
- Release dates: 26 August 1935 (Wien); 12 January 1937 (US)
- Running time: 85 minutes
- Countries: Austria; Switzerland
- Language: German

The Eternal Mask (German: Die ewige Maske) is a 1935 Austrian-Swiss drama film directed by Werner Hochbaum and starring Peter Petersen, Mathias Wieman and Franz Schafheitlin. The film was amongst the best ten foreign films of the year judged by the 1937 American National Board of Review of Motion Pictures. It also ran in competition at the 3rd Venice International Film Festival.

== Cast ==
- Peter Petersen as Professor Tscherko
- Mathias Wieman as Dr. Dumartin
- Franz Schafheitlin as Monsieur Negar
- Tom Kraa as Dr. Wendt
- Thekla Ahrens as Sister Anna
- Olga Chekhova as Madame Negar
- Karl Skraup as Le gardien

== Bibliography ==
- Bergfelder, Tim & Bock, Hans-Michael. The Concise Cinegraph: Encyclopedia of German Cinema. Berghahn Books, 2009.
- Kreimeier, Klaus. The Ufa story: a history of Germany's greatest film company, 1918-1945. University of California Press, 1999.
