= Lotte Koch =

German actress

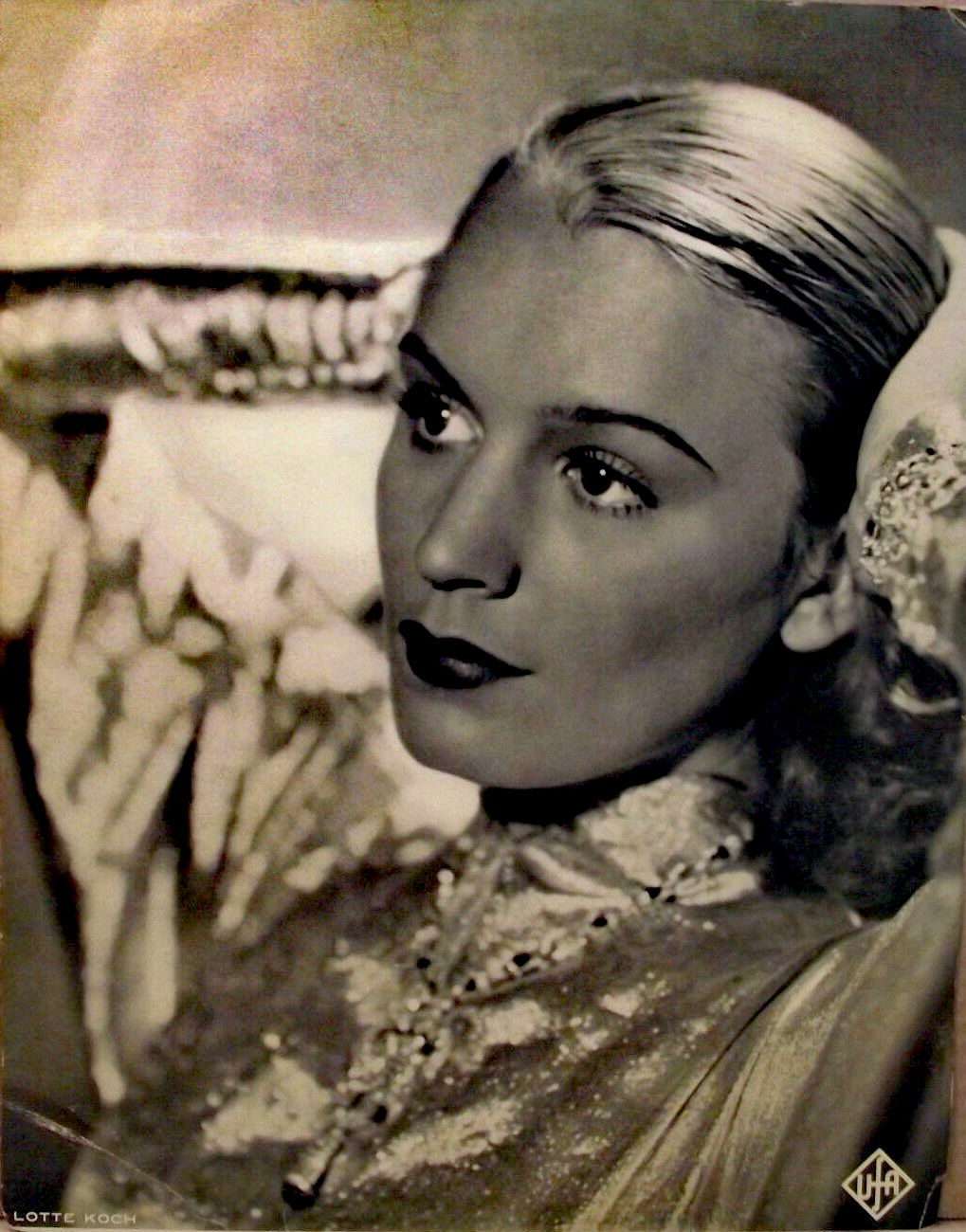
- Born: 9 March 1913; Brussels, Belgium
- Died: 26 May 2013 (aged 100); Munich, Bavaria; Germany
- Occupation: Actress
- Years active: 1936 – 1953 (film)

Lotte Koch (9 March 1913 – 26 May 2013) was a Belgian-born German film actress. She emerged as a star during the Nazi era, appearing in the 1944 drama The Black Robe. Following the Second World War she appeared in several rubble films including And the Heavens Above Us (1947) with Hans Albers.

== Selected filmography ==
- Lumpaci the Vagabond (1936)
- The Heart of a Queen (1940)
- Friedemann Bach (1941)
- Attack on Baku (1942)
- Germanin (1943)
- The Black Robe (1944)
- And the Heavens Above Us (1947)
- Morituri (1948)
- Search for Majora (1949)
- Madonna in Chains (1949)
- Captain Bay-Bay (1953)

== Bibliography ==
- Hake, Sabine. Popular Cinema of the Third Reich. University of Texas Press, 2001.
- Shandley, Robert R. Rubble Films: German Cinema in the Shadow of the Third Reich. Temple University Press, 2001.
