= New Shakespeare Theatre, Liverpool =

Coordinates: 53.410°N 2.976°W

The New Shakespeare Theatre, Liverpool, was a theatre in that British city's Fraser Street. The theatre opened in 1888 under the proprietorship of Mr Ellis Brammall jun. It was built by J H Havelock-Sutton (who went on to build the Park Palace Music Hall in 1893 and the Metropole Theatre in Bootle in 1911).

Among the distinguished names associated with the theatre was Sam Wanamaker, who was appointed director of the New Shakespeare Theatre in 1957 and served in that role until 1959.

During the early sixties a campaign to save the theatre was led by Alan Durband; in spite of considerable support, however, the theatre closed.

Following a fire which seriously damaged a large part of the structure, the theatre was demolished in 1976.

== See also ==
- Shakespeare North – Auditorium in Merseyside, England
