= Sun Over the Adriatic =

1954 film

- Directed by: Karl Georg Külb
- Written by: Karl Georg Külb
- Starring: Joachim Brennecke; Anneliese Kaplan; Carola Höhn
- Cinematography: Károly Kurzmayer
- Music by: Peter Igelhoff
- Production companies: Berlin-Film; Jadran Film
- Distributed by: Accord-Film
- Release date: 22 October 1954
- Running time: 89 minutes
- Countries: West Germany; Yugoslavia
- Language: German

Sun Over the Adriatic (German: Sonne über der Adria) is a 1954 musical comedy film directed by Karl Georg Külb and starring Joachim Brennecke, Anneliese Kaplan and Carola Höhn. It was made as a co-production between West Germany and Yugoslavia.

== Cast ==
- Joachim Brennecke as Charly
- Anneliese Kaplan as Dodo
- Carola Höhn as Frau Vogelsang
- Erika Remberg as Mira
- Heinz Lausch as Fred
- Pero Alexander as Ivo
- Klaus Havenstein as Bobby
- Ida Wüst as Beschlisserin
- Ludwig Schmidseder as Koch
- Kurt Großkurth as Ronic
- Fritz Lafontaine as Renard
- Hannes Keppler as Jack Dalton
- Jupp Hussels as Steward
- Hans Leibelt
- Ludwig Schürfeld
- René Carol as Singer
- Die Isaspatzen as Singers
- Sunshine Quartett as Singers
- H. Vojnovic as Mr. Barrow
- Ilse Wappler as Sängerin

== Bibliography ==
- Michael Petzel & Marie Versini. Der Weg zum Silbersee: Dreharbeiten und Drehorte der Karl-May-Filme. Schwarzkopf und Schwarzkopf, 2001.
