= The Theory of Good and Evil =

1907 book by Hastings Rashdall

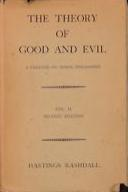
- Author: Hastings Rashdall
- Language: English
- Subject: Ethics
- Publisher: The Clarendon Press
- Publication date: 1907
- Publication place: United Kingdom
- Media type: Print (Hardcover and Paperback)
- Pages: 312 (vol. 1, Elibron edition); 464 (vol. 2, Elibron edition)
- ISBN: 978-1112155512 (vol. 1); 978-1112155505 (vol. 2)

The Theory of Good and Evil is a 1907 book about ethics by the English philosopher Hastings Rashdall. The book, which has been compared to the philosopher G. E. Moore's Principia Ethica (1903), is Rashdall's best known work, and is considered his most important philosophical work. Some commentators have suggested that, compared to Principia Ethica, it has been unfairly neglected.

== Summary ==
The Theory of Good and Evil is dedicated to Rashdall's teachers, the philosophers Thomas Hill Green and Henry Sidgwick. In the work, Rashdall discusses ethics; Rashdall states that the work is designed mainly to meet the needs of undergraduate philosophy students. Subjects addressed include utilitarianism, the work of the philosopher G. E. Moore, including Principia Ethica, the work of the philosopher F. H. Bradley, and Christian theology. In his second volume, he deals with potential objections to his views.

== Publication history ==
The Theory of Good and Evil was first published by the Clarendon Press in 1907. In 2004, it was republished by Elibron Classics.

== Reception ==
The Theory of Good and Evil is Rashdall's best known work, and is considered his most important philosophical work. The philosopher Richard Wollheim described the book as "a compendious work marred by priggishness". The philosopher Alan Stout argued that while it "made no distinctively original contribution to ethics", it was one of the best general introductions to the subject written before the development of meta-ethics and the application of philosophical analysis to ethics. He praised Rashdall's "through and comprehensive" treatment of ethics, and his use of "illuminating expositions and criticisms of theories of classical moral philosophers".

The philosophers John Rawls and Thomas Hurka have compared Rashdall's ethical views to those of Moore; the philosopher R. S. Downie maintained that Rashdall had been "unfairly eclipsed as a moral philosopher" by Moore. Hurka suggested that because The Theory of Good and Evil was published four years after Principia Ethica, it was unfairly neglected, despite presenting a more extensive treatment of some subjects. He considered Rashdall's most important contribution to be "to show how virtue can be valued intrinsically within a consequentialist framework". The philosopher Daniel Shannon criticized Rashdall's evaluation of Christian theology in The Theory of Good and Evil.

== See also ==
- A Theory of Justice
- Axiom of equity
