= The Kreutzer Sonata (1937 film) =

1937 film

- Directed by: Veit Harlan
- Written by: Leo Tolstoy (novel); Eva Leidmann
- Produced by: Georg Witt
- Starring: Lil Dagover; Peter Petersen; Albrecht Schoenhals
- Cinematography: Otto Baecker
- Edited by: Walter von Bonhorst
- Music by: Ernst Roters
- Production companies: Georg Witt-Film; UFA
- Distributed by: UFA
- Release date: 11 February 1937
- Running time: 85 minutes
- Country: Germany
- Language: German

The Kreutzer Sonata (German: Die Kreutzersonate) is a 1937 German drama film directed by Veit Harlan and starring Lil Dagover, Peter Petersen and Albrecht Schoenhals. It was based on the 1889 novella of the same name by Leo Tolstoy.

The film's art direction was by Otto Hunte and Willy Schiller.

== Cast ==
- Lil Dagover as Jelaina Posdnyschew
- Peter Petersen as Andrej Posdnyschew
- Albrecht Schoenhals as Gregor Tuchatschewsky
- Hilde Körber as Gruschenka
- Walter Werner as Dr. Raskin
- Wolfgang Kieling as Wassja
- Paul Bildt as Anwalt im Zugabteil
- Heinz Berghaus as Jungvermälter im Zugabteil
- Ilse Cotence as Dirne Lisawetha
- Margot Erbst as Landarbeiterin Marfa
- Hugo Flink as Gast bei Andrei
- Gabriele Hoffmann as Baronin auf Andrejs Fest
- Edith Linn as Fräulein im Zugabteil
- Paul Adalbert Ebelt as Gast auf Andrejs Fest
- Leo Peukert as Impresario Stansky
- Franz Pollandt as Troikakutscher
- Werner Siegert as Kartenspieler Maxim Wassilowitsch
- Armin Schweizer as Alter Mann im Zugabteil
- Lotte Spira as Fürstin auf Andrejs Fest
- Max Wilmsen as Ober im Wiesbadener Lokal
- Bruno Ziener as Diener Iwan
- Ellen Becker as 1. Verehrerin Gregors
- Friedl Hampter as Verehrerin Gregors
- Gertrud Hartwig as 3. Verehrerin Gregors
- Inge Stratner as Verehrerin Gregors
- Mussia Gürtler as Dienstmädchen Kitty
- Peter Busse as 1. Konzertbesucher in Wiesbaden
- Fritz Draeger as 2. Konzertbesucher in Wiesbaden
- Paul Ludwig Frey as 3. Konzertbesucher in Wiesbaden
- Werner Pledath as Hotelgast
- Ingeborg Carlsson as Blondine im Hotelspeisesaal
- Günther Lüders

== Bibliography ==
- Rentschler, Eric (1996). The Ministry of Illusion: Nazi Cinema and Its Afterlife. Harvard University Press. ISBN 978-0-674-57640-7.
