= Der Fackelträger =

1957 film

- Directed by: Johannes Knittel
- Written by: Friedrich Karl Hartmann; Walter Jupé
- Starring: Hermann Kiessner
- Release date: 25 October 1957
- Running time: 82 minutes
- Country: East Germany
- Language: German

Der Fackelträger is an East German black and white film directed by Johannes Knittel. It was released in 1957.

== Cast ==
- Hermann Kiessner as Dr. Sänger
- Loni Michelis as Frau Sänger
- Friedrich Gnaß as Kabische
- Harry Hindemith as Dr. Hartmann
- Horst Kube as Johannes
- Ruth Maria Kubitschek as Dora
- Georg Thies as Gottfried
- Margret Homeyer as Ingeborg
- Norbert Christian as Assessor Großkopf
- Charlotte Brummerhoff as Bittrich
- Horst Schönemann as Dr. Schleitz
- Wolf von Beneckendorff as Prosecutor General
- Hans W. Hamacher as Senator
- Annemarie Hase as Ziebusch
