= John Sephton =

British educator and author

- Born: October 29, 1837; Rainford, Lancashire
- Died: July 25, 1915 (aged 77); Liverpool
- Known for: The Saga of King Olaf Tryggvason of Norway

Academic background
- Education: St John’s College, Cambridge, B.A. (1862), M.A. (1865)

John Sephton (1837–1915) was a British educator, who was Headmaster of Liverpool Institute from 1866 to 1889, and Reader in Icelandic at the University of Liverpool from 1896 to 1910. He was best known for his translations of Icelandic sagas, including the Saga of Erik the Red in 1880, The Saga of King Olaf Tryggwason (1895) and Sverrissaga: The Saga of King Sverri (1899).

== Early life and career ==
Sephton was born in Rainford, Lancashire, to Mary and James. In 1858, he was admitted to St John’s College, Cambridge, where he studied mathematics. Sephton graduated with a B.A. in 1862, and was placed as Fifth Wrangler in the mathematical tripos, and was an awarded an M.A. in 1865. Sephton was a fellow of St John’s College from 1863 to 1866.

Sephton was ordained deacon in 1863, and in 1864 became a priest in Ely, Cambridgeshire. From 1862 to 1865, Sephton was assistant master at Highgate School, and parish clerk at St Anne's Church, Soho from 1865 to 1866. In 1866, Sephton was appointed headmaster of Liverpool Institute, a post he held until 1889. He later held the post of Reader in Icelandic in the newly opened Faculty of Arts at University College, Liverpool from 1896 to 1910.

== Works ==
During his time as headmaster in Liverpool, Sephton was actively engaged in local antiquarian scholarship, and became a collector of Icelandic books and manuscripts. During the 1870s Sephton began to work on translation, and developed a long correspondence and collaboration with the Icelandic and Scandinavian scholar, Guðbrandur Vigfússon, and joined the Viking Society in 1895. Much of Sephton's Icelandic book collection is now held in the Sydney Jones library at the University of Liverpool, along with some of his correspondence with Vigfusson.

Through his career, Sephton translated a number of Icelandic sagas from Norse into English, including:

- Sephton, J. (trans.). Eirik the Red's Saga: A Translation Read before the Literary and Philosophical Society of Liverpool, January 12, 1880.
- Sephton, J. (trans.) (1895). The Saga of King Olaf Tryggwason who Reigned Over Norway A.D. 995 to A.D. 1000. D. Nutt.
- Sephton, J. (trans.) (1899). Sverrissaga: The Saga of King Sverri.

Sephton also published a pamphlet on Christianity, and books on toponymy

- Sephton, John (1884). The lenten element in life : a sermon preached at St. Peter's Cathedral Church, Liverpool, March 12th, 1884. Henry Young, Liverpool.
- Sephton, John (1913). A Handbook of Lancashire Place-Names. Henry Young & Sons, Liverpool. p. 16.

== Family ==
Sephton married Clara Cooper in April 1866, and died in Liverpool in July 1915.
