= And the Heavens Above Us =

1947 film

- German film poster
- German: Und über uns der Himmel
- Directed by: Josef von Báky
- Written by: Gerhard Grindel
- Produced by: Richard König
- Starring: Hans Albers; Paul Edwin Roth; Lotte Koch; Annemarie Hase
- Cinematography: Werner Krien
- Edited by: Wolfgang Becker
- Music by: Theo Mackeben
- Production company: Objektiv Film
- Distributed by: Schorcht Film
- Release date: 9 December 1947
- Running time: 103 minutes
- Country: Germany
- Language: German

And the Heavens Above Us (German: Und über uns der Himmel) is a 1947 German drama film directed by Josef von Báky and starring Hans Albers, Paul Edwin Roth and Lotte Koch. It was part of the post-war series of rubble films.

It was shot at the Tempelhof Studios in Berlin and on location in the city. The film's sets were designed by the art directors Emil Hasler and Walter Kutz.

== Cast ==
- Hans Albers as Hans Richter
- Paul Edwin Roth as Werner Richter
- Lotte Koch as Edith Schröder
- Annemarie Hase as Frau Burghardt
- Heidi Scharf as Mizzi Burghardt
- Ralph Lothar as Fritz
- Otto Gebühr as Studienrat Heise
- Elsa Wagner as Frau Heise
- Ursula Barlen as Frau Roland
- Ludwig Linkmann as Georg
- Helmuth Helsig as Harry
