= Search for Majora =

1949 film

- Directed by: Hermann Pfeiffer
- Written by: Theo Rausch
- Produced by: Franz Vogel
- Starring: Lotte Koch; Hermann Speelmans; Camilla Horn
- Cinematography: Bruno Timm
- Edited by: Alexandra Anatra
- Music by: Werner Bochmann
- Production company: Euphono-Film
- Distributed by: Panorama-Film
- Release date: 2 September 1949
- Running time: 90 minutes
- Country: West Germany
- Language: German

Search for Majora (German: Gesucht wird Majora) is a 1949 West German crime film directed by Hermann Pfeiffer and starring Lotte Koch, Hermann Speelmans and Camilla Horn. It was shot at the Euphono Studios in Düsseldorf and on location around the city and its vicinity, including at Burg Castle. The film's sets were designed by the art director Alfred Bütow.

== Synopsis ==
Two returning prisoners of war attempt to find and deliver the formula for a revolutionary new synthetic fibre called Majora to the widow of the inventor, Professor Otto who told them its hidden whereabouts shortly before dying in a prisoner of war camp. They soon find a number of different figures on their trail including criminals and foreign spies.

== Cast ==
- Lotte Koch as Frau Dr. Otto
- Hermann Speelmans as Will Blom
- Camilla Horn as Gritt Faller
- Harald Paulsen as Der eitle Harry
- Rudolf Therkatz as Dr. Neuhoff
- Paul Henckels as Portier Wilkens
- Hans Zesch-Ballot as Prof. Mengler
- Werner Hessenland as Manzeiras
- Willy Millowitsch as Prack
- Tim Nolte as Klaus Otto
- Heinz Erhardt as singender Pianist
- Hans Fitz
- Marja Tamara
- Max Eckard
- Hans Müller-Westernhagen H

== Bibliography ==
- Davidson, John & Hake, Sabine. Framing the Fifties: Cinema in a Divided Germany. Berghahn Books, 2007.
