= Captain Bay-Bay =

1953 film directed by Helmut Käutner

- German film poster
- German: Käpt'n Bay-Bay
- Directed by: Helmut Käutner
- Written by: Iwa Wanja (play); Heinz Pauck; Per Schwenzen; Fritz Grasshoff; Helmut Käutner
- Produced by: Heinrich Jonen
- Starring: Hans Albers; Bum Krüger; Lotte Koch; Renate Mannhardt
- Cinematography: Friedl Behn-Grund
- Edited by: Ilse Voigt
- Music by: Norbert Schultze
- Production company: Meteor-Film
- Distributed by: Allianz Filmverleih
- Release date: 29 January 1953
- Running time: 101 minutes
- Country: West Germany
- Language: German

Captain Bay-Bay (German: Käpt'n Bay-Bay) is a 1953 West German musical comedy film directed by Helmut Käutner and starring Hans Albers, Bum Krüger and Lotte Koch. It is in the style of an operetta film. It was shot at the Wiesbaden Studios and on location in Hamburg as well as Ischia and Naples in Italy. The film's sets were designed by the art directors Paul Markwitz and Fritz Maurischat.

== Synopsis ==
On his wedding day a sea captain recounts his various adventures to his guests.

== Cast ==
- Hans Albers as Käpt'n Bay-Bay
- Bum Krüger as Smutje
- Lotte Koch as Hanna
- Renate Mannhardt as Manuela
- Angèle Durand as Goulou
- Anneliese Kaplan as Antje
- Rudolf Fernau as Dr. Mendez
- Ernst Fritz Fürbringer as Prefect
- Fritz Rémond Jr. as Blacky Blue
- Robert Meyn as customs commander
- Carsta Löck as Küster's wife
- Erna Sellmer as Tante Emma
- Maria Martinsen as Schwarze Witwe
- Rudolf Schündler as Wüllmann
- Willi Grill as Puvogel
- Fritz Benscher as broadcast reporter
- Francois Benga as Dr. Samuel
