= Henry Herbert Symonds =

Symonds, circa 1930

The Reverend Henry Herbert Symonds (1885 – 28 December 1958) was an English Anglican priest, teacher and conservationist.

From 1909 to 1935 he followed a career as a teacher, first at Clifton College and Rugby School, and later as headmaster of The King's School, Chester and the Liverpool Institute High School. He was a classicist, but encouraged his pupils to broaden their education by studying English literature and the fine arts.

Symonds, who had a lifelong love of the countryside, retired at the age of 50, and devoted his life to the cause of national parks, and the Lake District in particular. He was one of the principal driving forces behind the legislation that introduced national parks to Britain after the Second World War.

== Life and career ==
=== Early life and teaching career ===
Symonds was born in Royal Leamington Spa, Warwickshire, the son of Henry Symonds (1859–1933), a barrister, and his wife Florence Annie née Whitfield (1862–1941). His birth was registered in the first quarter of 1885 and he was baptised on 26 April 1885 at Leamington. He was educated at Rugby School and Oriel College, Oxford, where he took a first class degree in Greats (classics). While at Oxford he came under the influence of Hastings Rashdall, who inspired him with a lifelong love of the Lake District. After leaving Oxford he was appointed to the teaching staff of Clifton College in 1909. In 1911 he married Gwendolen Watson, with whom he had a son and two daughters.

In 1912 Symonds returned to Rugby as a master, taking charge of the senior classics form (known as the "Upper Bench"), a post that he retained for ten years. The Manchester Guardian wrote of this period of his career, "Symonds was a teacher of the highest order. He was exact in scholarship and copious in knowledge. His love for the Hellenic civilisation was profound and contagious: he was concerned that his pupils should be as familiar with its beauty as with its grammar and its chronology. They responded so well that three of his pupils took Firsts in Greats in a single year."

Symonds did not take a narrow view of the teaching of classics, and encouraged his pupils to study English literature and the fine arts, and to take up cross-country walking. He frequently invited them to his house to meet distinguished figures from politics and trade unions. He was active in the local branch of the Workers' Educational Association. In the school chapel some of his sermons were thought by traditionalists to be too radical, and there was controversy when he preached a sermon considered pacifist in tone.

In 1922, Symonds was appointed headmaster of The King's School, Chester. He later described his two years there as "somewhat storm-tossed, but educationally vital." In 1924 he was appointed headmaster of the Liverpool Institute High School for Boys. Here, The Manchester Guardian wrote, "he found real 'elbow-room' ... He was able to spread some liberalising doctrines and disciplines through a great day school." As at Rugby, he instructed the senior pupils in literature, painting, sculpture and architecture. One of his pupils later recalled:

His horizons were wider than his undisputed mastery of the Classics. He took the Sixth on Saturday mornings for what were later called "liberal studies". I recall one of our text books The Clash of Colour at a time when there was talk of the "Yellow Peril", a danger supposed to threaten from the teeming populations of the Far East. There were slide lectures on sculpture and painting. Greek and Roman architecture was supplemented by a tour of Liverpool's noteworthy buildings. He taught us to look at the tops of buildings, generally more interesting and informative than the bottom. And there was – perhaps one of the earliest – a talk on sex.

Admission to the school was strictly on intellectual ability, and many of the pupils came from families of modest means; Symonds personally subsidised many of them and helped them go on to a university education. He set up school camps in the Lake District in the Borrowdale and Duddon valleys.

In 1932 Symonds was invited to join the Headmasters' Conference. This would have given the Liverpool Institute the same official status as the leading public schools, but Symonds declined the invitation, explaining, despite local controversy, that the school belonged to the City of Liverpool and did not need to seek any other status.

=== Work for the Lake District ===
April 1933 saw the first publication of his book, "Walking in the Lake District". In 1935, on his 50th birthday, Symonds, resigned the headmastership, retired from teaching, and dedicated the rest of his life to preserving the beauty of the Lake District and promoting national parks. He had for some years been active in this sphere; he was the founding chairman of the association that opened Britain's first youth hostels for young walkers, was editor of the journal of the National Council of Ramblers' Federations, and published a book Walking in the Lake District in 1933. From 1935 he gave all his time to the Lake District and associated causes. He joined the new organisation Friends of the Lake District, and for "the next twenty years was its moving spirit", as treasurer, later secretary, and finally chairman. For the Councils for the Preservation of Rural England and Wales he was secretary to their joint National Parks Committee. In 1948 he presided at what became known as the "Ogwen Demonstration" at which hundreds of ramblers gathered to protest against plans to introduce intrusive hydro-electric plant into Snowdonia. His first wife died in 1937; the following year he married Ruth Williams; there were no children of the second marriage.

When the postwar Labour government finally introduced a parliamentary bill to enshrine national parks in British law, Symonds was a driving force in shaping the legislation. He was appointed to the planning board of the new Lake District National Park, and in 1957 he was invited to become a member of the National Parks Commission. In his later years he also served as president of the Ramblers' Association.

Symonds died in 1958, aged 73, leaving his estate, which was valued at £78,515 (equal to about £3,460,000 in 2009 terms), to the National Trust. It consisted chiefly of five farms in the Lake District. He left little money, having given most of what he had to the trust and other conservation bodies during his lifetime.
