= Christopher Dilke =

English writer (1913–1987)

Christopher Wentworth Dilke (15 December 1913 – 9 November 1987) was an English writer. He was a member of a literary family. His mother (Ethel Clifford) and grandmother (Lucy Clifford), as well as his great-uncle, Sir Charles Dilke, the statesman, were authors. He was educated at Winchester College and Trinity College, Cambridge, which he left after a year to become a journalist with the Daily Express. He then worked in publishing.

During the Second World War Dilke served in the Royal Artillery. He became a lieutenant colonel and was mentioned in dispatches. In 1945 he was Press Controller in the west of Germany, with the task of liquidating the Nazi press and starting democratic newspapers.

At the end of the same year he joined the British Broadcasting Corporation as head of English by Radio and Television. In his time at the BBC he also was a presenter for the German Service

Dilke wrote for radio and film, and was the author of a number of books, including The Bridgehead, A Name for Myself, The Rotten Apple and Dr. Moberly's Mint-Mark, a study of Winchester College. The dustwrapper to A Name for Myself notes that his previous novels had been highly praised by Graham Greene and Elizabeth Bowen. Lionel Hale, in The Observer, referencing the film of Greene's The Third Man, commented: "Mr Dilke has...omitted zither music: but all the other ingredients of the intelligent thriller are there."

He married Alice Mary Best, and had four children.
