= The Black Robe (film) =

1944 film

- Directed by: Fritz Peter Buch
- Written by: Erich Ebermayer; Iva Raffay; Fritz Peter Buch
- Produced by: Franz Vogel
- Starring: Lotte Koch; Richard Häussler; Kirsten Heiberg; Peter Widmann
- Cinematography: Kurt Schulz
- Edited by: Elisabeth Kleinert-Neumann
- Music by: Werner Bochmann
- Production company: Berlin Film
- Distributed by: Deutsche Filmvertriebs
- Release date: 4 September 1944
- Running time: 107 minutes
- Country: Germany
- Language: German

The Black Robe (German: Die schwarze Robe) is a 1944 German drama film directed by Fritz Peter Buch and starring Lotte Koch, Richard Häussler, and Kirsten Heiberg. It was shot at the Cinetone Studios in Amsterdam and the Filmstad in The Hague, both in the German-occupied Netherlands. location filming took place around Börnicke Castle and Strausberg. The film's sets were designed by the art directors Hermann Asmus and Herbert Nitzschke.

== Synopsis ==
An ambitious public prosecutor neglects her husband to pursue her career, but has to change course when her husband is caught up in a court case.

== Cast ==
- Lotte Koch as Maria Boddin, Rechtsanwältin
- Richard Häussler as Uwe Boddin, Maler
- Kirsten Heiberg as Irene Friedberg
- Peter Widmann as Dr. Bergius, Archäologe
- Otto Treßler as Baron Friedberg
- Max Gülstorff as Mahr, Lehrer
- Ludwig Körner as Matthies, Landgerichtsdirektor
- Franz Schafheitlin as Dr. Lindener, Prosecutor
- Ursula Voß as Anna Felbinger
- Luise Hohorst as Frau Kern
- Anneliese Würtz as Lisa, Dienstmädchen
- Willi Rose as Schulz, Zeuge
- Toni von Bukovics as Bawett, Wirtschafterin
- Margarete Sachse as Fräulein Schnell, Bürovorsteherin
- Tina Schneider as Rosa Burger
- Hanns Waschatko as Franz, Diener
- Wölle Dresing as Knut
- Ernst Stimmel as Akademieprofessor
- Walter Brückner as Geschworener
- Karl Hannemann
- Paul Rehkopf

== Bibliography ==
- Hake, Sabine (2001). Popular Cinema of the Third Reich. Austin: University of Texas Press. ISBN 978-0-292-73458-6.
