= Sherlock Holmes (1967 TV series) =

- Starring: Erich Schellow; Paul Edwin Roth
- No. of series: 1
- No. of episodes: 6 Episode list

Original release
- Release: 28 August 1967 – 13 February 1968

Sherlock Holmes is a German 1967 television series featuring Erich Schellow as Sherlock Holmes and Paul Edwin Roth as Dr. Watson.

The series aired on WDR from 28 August 1967 to 13 February 1968 and is formed by six episodes, each one adapting a Sherlock Holmes short story written by Arthur Conan Doyle, though the scripts are based on the adaptations made in the first season of the British TV series Sherlock Holmes (1965–1968). A DVD was issued in 2012 as number 45 in the Straßenfeger compilation series of crime-related film and TV productions, along with Conan Doyle und der Fall Edalji (1966) and Sherlock Holmes und das Halsband des Todes (1962), all with German language soundtracks only, and no subtitles.

== Episodes ==
n°	Title	Broadcast Date	Short story the episodes is based on
1	Das gefleckte Band	28 August 1967	The Adventure of the Speckled Band
2	Sechsmal Napoleon	2 October 1967	The Adventure of the Six Napoleons
3	Die Liga der Rothaarigen	7 November 1967	The Red-Headed League
4	Die Bruce-Partington-Pläne	6 December 1968	The Adventure of the Bruce-Partington Plans
5	Das Beryll-Diadem	9 January 1968	The Adventure of the Beryl Coronet
6	Das Haus bei den Blutbuchen	13 February 1968	The Adventure of the Copper Beeches
