= Peter Petersen (actor) =

Austrian actor

- Born: 18 November 1876; Hamburg, German Empire
- Died: 11 March 1956 (aged 79); Vienna, Austria
- Other name: Max Paulsen
- Occupations: Actor, theatre director
- Years active: 1934–1951 (film)

Peter Petersen (November 18, 1876 – March 11, 1956) was a German-born Austrian actor and theatre director. Although his career was largely devoted to the stage, he also starred in occasional films as well. These included the Nazi propaganda films Homecoming (1941) and Germanin (1943). He was married to the actress Hedwig Bleibtreu.

== Selected filmography ==
- Maskerade (1934)
- The Eternal Mask (1935)
- The Kreutzer Sonata (1937)
- Maja zwischen zwei Ehen (1938)
- Homecoming (1941)
- Germanin (1943)
- The Sonnenbrucks (1951)

== Bibliography ==
- Giesen, Rolf. Nazi Propaganda Films: A History and Filmography. McFarland & Company, 2003.
- Welch, David. Propaganda and the German Cinema, 1933–1945. I.B.Tauris, 2001.
