= Alfred Bütow =

- Born: 28 July 1902; Berlin, Prussia, German Empire
- Died: 3 April 1986 (aged 83); Herrsching, Bavaria, West Germany
- Occupation: Art director
- Years active: 1934-1961 (film & TV)

Alfred Bütow (1902 – 1986) was a German art director. Originally he worked on scenic design in the theatre before switching to the film industry. He worked on the set design of over fifty films during his career.

== Selected filmography ==
- Hearts are Trumps (1934)
- Moscow-Shanghai (1936)
- The Czar's Courier (1936)
- Alarm in Peking (1937)
- Talking About Jacqueline (1937)
- Secret Mission (1938)
- Police Report (1939)
- Mistress Moon (1941)
- Mask in Blue (1943)
- Carnival of Love (1943)
- The Roedern Affair (1944)
- Thank You, I'm Fine (1948)
- Search for Majora (1949)
- Madonna in Chains (1949)
- Wedding with Erika (1950)
- The Thief of Bagdad (1952)
- Fritz and Friederike (1952)
- Prosecutor Corda (1953)
- A Double Life (1954)
- The Golden Plague (1954)
- Ball of Nations (1954)
- Ripening Youth (1955)
- Inspector Hornleigh Intervenes (1961, TV series)

== Bibliography ==
- Rolf Giesen. Nazi Propaganda Films: A History and Filmography. McFarland, 2003.
