= Catherine Fried =

British artist, photographer and writer

Catherine Olivia Jean Fried (née Boswell; 1 October 1936 – 4 February 2015) was a British artist, photographer, and writer. She was the third wife of the poet Erich Fried, although her own career came to the fore following his death.

== Selected works ==
- Fried, Erich (1985). In die Sinne einradiert (in German). Illustrated by Catherine Fried-Boswell. Köln: Bund-Verlag. ISBN 978-3766307958.
- Fried, Catherine (2008). Über kurz oder lang: Erinnerungen an Erich Fried (in German). Berlin: Wagenbach. ISBN 978-3803112576.
- Boswell Fried, Catherine (2008). The Long and Short of It.
