= BBC German Service =

German language radio of the BBC (1938-1999)

Londoner Rundfunk
- London; United Kingdom
- Broadcast area: Germany (primarily)

Programming
- Language: German
- Format: Propaganda
- Affiliations: Primarily British broadcasters aided by German exiles

Ownership
- Owner: BBC European Service
- Sister stations: Radio Belgique; Radio Londres

History
- First air date: 27 September 1938
- Last air date: 26 March 1999

Links
- Website: official website (archived)

The Londoner Rundfunk (German: London Broadcasting; English: German Service) of the BBC was a German language radio service running from 1938 until 1999 as part of the wider BBC European Service. It began operating during the Second World War and continued running until after the dissolution of the GDR and the end of the Cold War. With a broadcast time that never exceeded a few hours a day what was first conceived as a propaganda broadcast became a source for reliable information on the state of the war, and later the 'voice of the free world' to those behind the Iron Curtain.

The station first broadcast on 27 September 1938. Regular programming began on 27 January 1939 and was expanded in April, after the complete occupation of Czechoslovakia. The first Head of the BBC German Service was Hugh Greene. Other early leadership included Lindley Fraser, formerly professor of philosophy at Aberdeen, as well as Richard Crossman and Patrick Gordon Walker who would move on to become leading figures in the Labour Party.

During the war many prominent German exiles contributed to the programme, including Thomas Mann, Walter Rilla and Bruno Adler. The Nazi regime came to call it the number one enemy broadcast.

Throughout the years of the Iron Curtain, programmes such as Briefe ohne Unterschrift (Letters without signature) would give a voice to those trapped in the German Democratic Republic. The East German Stasi extensively investigated, tracked and persecuted all involved; the extent of which became clear only after the reunification of Germany and only because of the extensive records kept.

The broadcast ceased operations in 1999 due to financial reasons, and because listener-polls showed that 90 per cent of listeners would be able to follow the English BBC World Service.

== History ==
=== World War II ===
The British policy of appeasement regarding fascist Italy and Germany eventually lead to the Phoney War; the period between the British declaration of war on Germany, 3 September 1939, and the German invasion of France, 10 May 1940.

Starting with a speech given by Neville Chamberlain on 27 September 1938 in the days prior to the conference on the Munich Agreement, the BBC, at the request of the government, began broadcasting regular programmes in German. First to project the British position and later as propaganda against Nazi rule, believed at the time to have weak support.

What was conceived as propaganda broadcast—an initially quite chaotic and ineffective one—throughout the war years, became a staple for accurate information on the state of the war in Germany; a strategy designed to build trust with the international audience of all Overseas Services. The resounding success of their strategy the BBC would become aware of only in 1944, when the allies gained access to the continent again.

Tangye Lean was responsible for the broadcast's news strategy. He was of the majority of those who believed Nazi programming to be monotone and dull; and that running programming contrary to that would better capture the interest of the German audience. Recent research on Nazi radio programmes suggests that, while the broadcasts were a great success by the end of the war, there was more variety in the broadcasts produced in Nazi Germany than Lean, and others, allowed for or even suspected.

Besides the news, the programming included political commentary and satire. A sense of the 'inevitability of the German defeat' was imbued into every broadcast, and the Nazi Party came to call it the "enemy broadcast number one" (Feindsender Nummer Eins). Significant punishment was doled out for listening; those deemed Rundfunkverbrecher [radio traitors] by 1941 would get up to 8 years of Zuchthaus and even, as in the case of 17-year-old Helmuth Hübener, the death penalty when they worked to disseminate the news.

Sefton Delmer worked as announcer on the 'white' programme, prior to being recruited as Special Operations Executive for non-BBC 'black propaganda'; going on to work on: Gustav Siegfried Eins, Deutscher Kurzwellensender Atlantik and Soldatensender Calais. Notable German contributors to the wartime broadcast included: Thomas Mann (Listen, Germany!), Sigmund Freud, Peter Illing, Ernst Schoen, Bruno Adler, Annemarie Hase, Robert Lucas, Walter Rilla and many other exiles.

Contrary to the policy of the home service, the audience never got to know the names of the broadcast's speakers. It was feared that the German contributors be labeled 'traitors' and 'Jews', as explained by Lindley Fraser, a Scottish academic who became one of the most important personality speakers of the German Service. In order not to diminish the effectiveness of the broadcast, Jews were discouraged from speaking on the German broadcast even, due to their accents being recognisable.

Satirical programmes were particularly popular. These brief programmes featured recurring characters known to regular listeners who would comment on the situation in Germany and the larger world. Three of the most popular serials that were broadcast throughout most of the war were:

- Bruno Adler, under the pseudonym Urban Roedl, created the satirical Frau Wernicke, a programme broadcast from summer 1940 to January 1944. The lead role, Frau Gertrud Wernicke, was voiced by the German actress and cabaret artist Annemarie Hase, also in exile. The character was a Berlin woman married to a tradesman and World War I veteran. She commented on the shortages plaguing the German populace, the state of the war and she launched subversive tirades against the Nazis, turning them into a laughing stock. Frau Wernicke became one of the most popular programmes of the BBC's German Service.
- Adler wrote the satirical series Kurt und Willi with the Scottish poet Norman Cameron. It featured two characters, a teacher named Kurt Krüger and Willi Schimanski, an official in the German Ministry of Propaganda. So skilled was the character Willi as a propagandist, that he was reputedly much admired within the actual Nazi Ministry.
- The series Briefe des Gefreiten Hirnschal an seine Frau in Zwieselsdorf created by Robert Lucas also enjoyed great popularity. Here, the simple and loyal soldier Adolf Hirnschal (voice: Frederick Schrecker) reported to his wife Amalia in letters from the front.

=== Cold War ===
In 1946 the discontinuation of the service was discussed, and it was argued that the broadcast was still 'in the public interest'.

Other German-language stations broadcasting to East Germany included Nordwestdeutscher Rundfunk, the Radio in the American Sector, which was run by the Germans but controlled by the US, and Sender Freies Berlin. The US's state-run Voice of America also continued its German language programme. Opposition in the east were Berliner Rundfunk and Moscow Radio. The BBC would operate in a much more reserved manner, compared to the other broadcasters—less 'liberationist'. Policy was instead to 'criticise the East German leadership, whilst not encouraging its overthrow.' The German Service in fact took great care to avoid fostering expectations of direct Western intervention.

During the war Hugh Greene, the first Head of the BBC German Service, had already developed plans for an English language course: Lernt Englisch im Londoner Rundfunk! It became one of the most successful broadcast series of the post-war years. For almost thirty years, new courses were brought out with the collaboration of the former German actor Karlheinz Jaffé. The language course was intended to be educational on the one hand and entertaining on the other, so that even listeners who did not want to learn English followed the programme with interest. The courses in this language learning programme have been adopted by almost all ARD broadcasters over the years, also in Austria and Switzerland and also published in book form.

In 1949, the BBC introduced a “German East Zone Programme” within its existing German service, which was specifically aimed at listeners behind the “Iron Curtain”. The intention was to provide current news, which was becoming increasingly difficult to obtain in the then newly founded GDR. Building on the success of its wartime broadcasts to Nazi Germany, the German Service gradually introduced political commentary, religious lectures, and comedy features into its “Eastern Zone Programme.” The most popular of which were The Two Comrades (1949–1963), Letters without Signature (1949–1974) and The Surprised Newspaper Reader (1950–1972).

Bruno Adler, a German-speaking Czech, was tasked with creating a series titled ‘'The Two Comrades’' (‘Die zwei Genossen’), which bore a remarkable resemblance to his wartime 'Kurt und Willi' series. In this narrative, a Party official educates his somewhat naive friend about the reality behind the facade of official propaganda.

Robert Lucas, a Jewish-Austrian émigré who had previously written the humorous letters of Adolf Hirnschal during the war, now authored a series named ‘'The Surprised Newspaper Reader'’ (‘Der verwunderte Zeitungsleser’). This series offered a humorous review of East Zone press content, coupled with ironic commentary that exposed the contradictions within GDR state-controlled journalism.

The 20-minute programme Briefe ohne Unterschrift ("Letters without Signature") has been an integral part of the Programme for East Germany since 1955 (previously it was called Funkbriefkasten). This mailbox programme was heard every Friday from 8:15 p.m. The idea was: listeners wrote to the BBC in London, where the programme's German-speaking presenter, Austin Harrison, selected a number of letters for the broadcast. He was actually live on air every week, reading out the letters he had selected without mentioning the sender's name, answering them and classifying them with comments. Harrison hosted the show from 1955 until its end in 1974.

The East German Stasi had already begun intercepting letters sent to the BBC's P.O. box in West Berlin by 1954, but instead of cancelling the programme the German Service started rotating P.O. boxes and eventually implemented a system of fake addresses, often associated with properties reduced to rubble in the Allied bombings to prompt the postal service to redirect letters to the BBC office.

The programme's reliance on letters from East German listeners posed significant risks, exposing them to potential reprisals as government surveillance grew more efficient. Until 1961, when the Berlin Wall was built, listeners could mail letters from West Berlin or visit the BBC German Service office on Savignyplatz, but both options carried danger.

Despite the dangers, some continued to write, believing the BBC's service was worth it, especially during crises like the 1953 workers' uprising. This persistence underscored the importance of impartial news broadcasts in politically tumultuous times, as highlighted in a report after the 1956 Hungarian uprising.

In 1956, the foreign services of the BBC, including the German Service, continued even-handed reporting on the Suez Crisis, in spite of the Government pressuring the BBC to support the war.

The German service of the BBC apparently collaborated closely with a secret propaganda department of the British Foreign Office for decades. Austin Harrison wrote detailed reports about his visits to the GDR to the Foreign Office; reports that were forwarded to the West German government in Bonn as well.

The BBC discontinued its “Programme for East Germany” in 1975, after which only a cross-German service remained. And on 26 March 1999, the German Service was discontinued for financial reasons. There was no reason to give it money any more, after all the whole of Germany once again had solid democratic foundations and a free press. Polling also had indicated that 90 per cent of listeners would be able to follow the English-language BBC World Service.

== People ==
- Exiles who were employed by the BBC during the war included Carl Brinitzer, Michael Kerr, Elisabeth Gundolf, Walter Rilla, Robert Ehrenzweig (Note: Robert Ehrenzweig was known as Robert Lucas at the BBC.) and Hans Huyn. Erich Fried was a valuable writer during the postwar years. In 1958, the German Service aired a series of twelve talks by Alfred Kantorowicz. Manfred Hertwig also appeared on the programme.
- The British leading figures of the German Service included Hugh Greene, Lindley Fraser, Richard Crossman and Sefton Delmer Also Patrick Gordon Walker, who emphasised talking to the German worker. Christopher Dilke was a presenter on the programme.

== See also ==
- Public diplomacy
- Radio propaganda
- International broadcasting
