= Paul Edwin Roth =

German film actor (1918–1985)

- Born: 22 October 1918; Hamburg, German Empire
- Died: 28 October 1985 (aged 67); Munich, West Germany
- Occupation: Actor
- Years active: 1945 - 1987 (film)

Paul Edwin Roth (22 October 1918 – 28 October 1985) was a German stage, television and film actor. Roth made his screen debut in the rubble film And the Heavens Above Us (1947). He was a regular in West German films and television during the post-war years. He was also a notable voice actor, dubbing a number of international stars (particularly American and British) for the German market.

== Selected filmography ==
- And the Heavens Above Us (1947) - Werner Richter
- Our Daily Bread (1949) - Harry Webers
- Ingrid – Die Geschichte eines Fotomodells (1955)
- Children, Mother, and the General (1955)
- Confess, Doctor Corda (1958) - Dr. Schimmer
- For Love and Others (1959) - Otto Lürmann
- Im Namen einer Mutter (1960) - Sachverständiger
- Officer Factory (1960) - Oberfeldrichter Wirrmann
- The Miracle of Father Malachia (1961) - Secretary of the Bishop
- The Longest Day (1962) - Col. Schiller (uncredited)
- Irrungen - Wirrungen (1966) - Sprecher
- 4 Schlüssel (1966) - Konrad von Brenken
- Die Gentlemen bitten zur Kasse (1966, TV miniseries) - Peter Masterson
- Sherlock Holmes - Dr. Watson
- The Bordello (1971) - Herr Silberstein
- Und Jimmy ging zum Regenbogen (1971) - Dr. Karl Friedjung
- Zoff (1972)
- The Stuff That Dreams Are Made Of (1972) - Oswald Seerose
- Die Hinrichtung (1976)
- Drei Bürger zum Geburtstag (1979)
- Drei Schwedinnen auf der Reeperbahn (1980) - Jens-Uwe
- Seitenstechen (1985) - Norbert's father
- Zirkuskinder (1985) - Pfarrer Erhardt (final film role)

== Bibliography ==
- Shandley, Robert R. Rubble Films: German Cinema in the Shadow of the Third Reich. Temple University Press, 2001.
