= A Girl from Paris =

1954 film

- Etchika Choureau in a scene from the film
- Directed by: Franz Seitz
- Written by: Karl Peter Gillmann
- Starring: Etchika Choureau; Erich Schellow; Hans Leibelt
- Cinematography: Heinz Schnackertz
- Music by: Peter Kreuder
- Production company: Ariston Film
- Distributed by: Columbia Film
- Release date: 23 November 1954
- Running time: 90 minutes
- Country: West Germany
- Language: German

A Girl from Paris (German: Ein Mädchen aus Paris) is a 1954 West German comedy film directed by Franz Seitz, Jr. and starring Etchika Choureau, Erich Schellow, and Hans Leibelt. The film's sets were designed by the art director Arne Flekstad. Location shooting took place in Munich and Paris. It premiered at West Berlin's Marmorhaus cinema.

== Cast ==
- Etchika Choureau
- Erich Schellow
- Hans Leibelt
- Josef Sieber
- Anneliese Kaplan
- John Van Dreelen
- Oliver Hassencamp
- Margarete Haagen
- Ferdinand Anton
- Otto Brüggemann
- Hildegard Busse
- Jochen Diestelmann
- Angèle Durand
- Waldemar Frahm
- Harry Hertzsch
- Emiljosef Hunek
- Bruno Hübner
- Herbert Hübner
- Karl Kunst
- Joachim Mock
- Rolf Olsen
- Karl-Heinz Peters
- Alfred Pongratz
- Gisela Reiche
- Raymond Rives
- Paul Schlander
- Ida Shoemaker
- Wolfgang Wahl
- Annelore Wied
- Elisabeth Wischert

== Bibliography ==
- Dillmann, Claudia; Loewy, Ronny (2004). 2 × 20. Juli: die Doppelverfilmung von 1955. Frankfurt: Deutsches Filminstitut. ISBN 978-3-88799-070-1.
