= Germanin (film) =

1943 film

- Directed by: Max W. Kimmich
- Written by: Max W. Kimmich; Hans Wolfgang Hillers
- Based on: Germanin by Hellmuth Unger
- Produced by: Max W. Kimmich
- Starring: Peter Petersen; Luis Trenker; Lotte Koch
- Cinematography: Jan Stallich; Jaroslav Tuzar
- Edited by: Erich Kobler
- Music by: Theo Mackeben
- Production company: UFA
- Distributed by: Deutsche Filmvertriebs
- Release date: 17 May 1943
- Running time: 92 minutes
- Country: Germany
- Language: German

Germanin is a 1943 German drama film directed by Max W. Kimmich and starring Peter Petersen, Luis Trenker and Lotte Koch. The film's sets were designed by the art director Anton Weber. It was shot at the Babelsberg Studios in Berlin and the Cinecittà Studios in Rome with on location around Rome. It is adapted from the novel of the same title by Hellmuth Unger, as well as the uncredited use of material from Tsetse by Norbert Jacques. Like the 1941 film Carl Peters it was produced as an anti-British propaganda film attacking the British Empire in Africa.

== Synopsis ==
A German medical expedition heads to Central Africa aims to test the suramin serum known as Germanin in order to treat the deadly sleeping sickness spread by the tsetse fly. When the First World War breaks out British troops attack and destroy the medical mission. One of the doctors, Hans Hofer is able to flee with the important information of their research. After the war they return to the territory, now a British colony due to the Peace of Versailles, to cure the locals with the Germanin medicine. However the British attempt to sabotage their efforts and instead promote a much inferior drug produced by their American allies.

== Cast ==
- Peter Petersen as Professor Achenbach
- Luis Trenker as Doctor Hans Hofer
- Lotte Koch as Anna Meinhardt
- Albert Lippert as Colonel Crosby
- Rudolf Blümner as Geheimrat Wißberg
- Gerda von der Osten as Sekretärin der Bayer-Werke AG
- Ernst Stimmel as Direktor Claassen
- Karl Günther as Doctor Bode
- Henry Stuart as Sir Edward Craigh
- Helmuth Helsig as Doctor Gordon
- Joe Münch-Harris as Captain Evans
- Louis Brody as King Wapunga
- Valy Arnheim as English Diplomat
- Hans Bergmann as English Sergeant
- Erich Kestin as Straßenhändler
- Herbert Weissbach as Unfreundlicher Fahrgast

== Bibliography ==
- Giesen, Rolf. Nazi Propaganda Films: A History and Filmography. McFarland & Company, 2003.
- Hull, David Stewart. Film in the Third Reich: Art and Propaganda in Nazi Germany, Simon & Schuster, 1973.
- Klaus, Ulrich J. Deutsche Tonfilme: Jahrgang 1943. Klaus-Archiv, 1988.
- Welch, David. Propaganda and the German Cinema, 1933-1945. I.B.Tauris, 2001.
