= In Those Days =

1947 film directed by Helmut Käutner

- German film Poster
- German: In jenen Tagen
- Directed by: Helmut Käutner
- Written by: Helmut Käutner; Ernst Schnabel
- Starring: Gert Schäfer; Erich Schellow; Winnie Markus; Werner Hinz
- Cinematography: Igor Oberberg
- Edited by: Wolfgang Wehrum
- Music by: Bernhard Eichhorn
- Production company: Camera-Filmproduktion
- Distributed by: Britischer Atlas-Filmverleih (British Zone); Prisma-Filmverleih (French & American Zones); Sovexport-Film GmbH (Soviet Zone)
- Release date: 13 June 1947
- Running time: 111 minutes
- Country: Germany
- Language: German

In Those Days (German: In jenen Tagen) is a 1947 German drama film directed by Helmut Käutner and starring Gert Schäfer, Erich Schellow and Winnie Markus. It was one of the cycle of Rubble films made in the wake of Germany's defeat during World War II. The film addresses issues of collective guilt during the Nazi era, using the device of a car built in 1933 and dismantled in 1947 narrating the various experiences of its owners in a series of seven separate episodes. The film's objective was to highlight the private resistance of various figures to the Nazis even while they publicly accepted the repression of Nazi society.

== Cast ==
- Helmut Käutner as Voice of the Car
- Gert Karl Schaefer as Willi
- Erich Schellow as Karl
- Winnie Markus as Sybille
- Werner Hinz as Steffen
- Karl John as Peter Keyser
- Erich Weiher as Fitter
- Alice Treff as Elisabeth Buschenhagen
- Franz Schafheitlin as Wolfgang Buschenhagen
- Hans Nielsen as Wolfgang Grunelius
- Gisela Tantau as Angela Buschenhagen
- Ida Ehre as Sally Bienert
- Willy Maertens as Wilhelm Bienert
- Erica Balqué as Dorothea Wieland
- Eva Gotthardt as Ruth
- Hermann Schomberg as Dr. Ansbach
- Kurt Meister as Policeman
- Hermann Speelmans as August Hintze
- Fritz Wagner as Lieutenant
- Hans Mahnke as Niginski
- Isa Vermehren as Erna
- Margarete Haagen as Baronin von Thorn
- Franz Weber as Ein Polizist
- Erwin Geschonneck as Schmitt
- Carl Raddatz as Josef
- Bettina Moissi as Marie

== Production ==
The film was produced in Hamburg in the British Zone as part of a growing post-war trend in western Germany of moving film production away from its traditional centre of Berlin. The film was made under extremely difficult conditions including a lack of raw film stock and hunger amongst the cast and technicians. The director, Helmut Käutner, had several of his earlier films banned by the Nazis which led to him being perceived as possessing greater moral authority than many of his colleagues. Consequently, the film was seen as a standard-bearer for the values of the post-war German film industry.

== Reception ==
It was well received by the German public in 1947 who were generally receptive to its message. In the 1960s the film began to attract criticism for allegedly whitewashing ordinary Germans' acceptance of Nazi ideology. However, this criticism has in turn been challenged as being ahistorical and ignoring the conditions under which it was made - such as the constraints put on German film-makers by the Allied occupation powers and the aversion of contemporary German audiences to films that explicitly examined their possible collective guilt.
