= Madonna in Chains =

1949 film

- German film poster
- German: Madonna in Ketten
- Directed by: Gerhard Lamprecht
- Written by: H. C. Pelman; Theo Rausch
- Produced by: Franz Vogel
- Starring: Lotte Koch; Karin Hardt; Elisabeth Flickenschildt
- Cinematography: Bruno Timm
- Edited by: Eva Kalthoff
- Music by: Hans Carste
- Production company: Euphono-Film
- Distributed by: Panorama-Film
- Release date: 3 November 1949
- Running time: 85 minutes
- Country: West Germany
- Language: German

Madonna in Chains (German: Madonna in Ketten) is a 1949 West German drama film directed by Gerhard Lamprecht and starring Lotte Koch, Karin Hardt and Elisabeth Flickenschildt. It was shot in studios in Düsseldorf with location shooting took place in the surrounding region. The film's sets were designed by the art director Alfred Bütow.

== Plot ==
A woman is wrongly convicted of a crime that was really committed by her husband. While in prison she gives birth and the child is put up for adoption. Once fresh evidence frees her from jail, the woman goes searching for her daughter.

== Cast ==
- Lotte Koch as Maria Randolf
- Karin Hardt as Gerda Wienholt
- Elisabeth Flickenschildt as Gabriele Custodis
- Elise Aulinger as Nickel, mother
- Dagmar Jansen as Christa, child
- Richard Häussler as Professor Wienholt
- Heinz Schorlemmer as Dr. Peter Gellert
- Werner Hessenland as Randolf, general director
- Rudolf Therkatz as Director Weigant
- Willy Millowitsch as Prof. Kleinschmidt
- Paul Heidemann as Dr. Klaussen
- Elisabeth Botz
- Frigga Braut as Supervisor Hansen
- Emmy Graetz as Gertrud, gatekeeper
- Hiltraud Helling
- Renate Hofrichter
- Alfons Godard
- Carl Möller
- Wilhelm Semmelroth
- Hermann Weisse as Bertrich, warden
