= Robert Lucas (writer) =

Austrian Jewish writer

- Born: 8 May 1904; Vienna, Austria
- Died: 19 January 1984 (aged 79); London, United Kingdom
- Other names: Robert Ehrenzweig
- Occupations: Writer; journalist

Robert Lucas (born Robert Ehrenzweig, 8 May 1904 – 19 January 1984) was an Austrian Jewish writer.

Lucas studied chemistry and physics at the Vienna University of Technology and University of Vienna. He worked later as an author for the socialdemocratic publisher Vorwärts-Verlag and was writing political cabarets. In 1931 he wrote the opening ceremony "Das Große Festspiel" for the 1931 Workers' Olympiad in Vienna.

Lucas emigrated to London in 1934 as the Social Democratic Workers' Party of Austria was outlawed and many of its members imprisoned by the Austrofascist regime. He was a correspondent for the Austrian newspaper Neue Freie Presse and from 1938, worked for the German Service of the BBC. During the war he wrote German-language British propaganda with other emigrants, like Bruno Adler. In 1940 Lucas created a fictional character "Corporal Adolf Hirnschal" and wrote hundreds of satires that were produced by the BBC and broadcast to Germany.

His 1972 biography of Frieda Lawrence was translated into English by Geoffrey Skelton.

== Honors ==
- Order of the British Empire (1966)
- Decoration of Honour for Services to the Republic of Austria
