= Ernst Stimmel =

German actor

- Born: 23 March 1891; Hamburg, German Empire
- Died: 28 March 1978 (aged 87); Reichenau, Baden-Württemberg, West Germany
- Occupations: Actor, playwright
- Years active: 1936-1951 (film)

Ernst Stimmel (23 March 1891 – 28 March 1978) was a German film and stage actor. He was also a playwright. During the Nazi era he played supporting roles in a number of film productions, including Battle Squadron Lützow (1941) and Germanin (1943).

== Selected filmography ==
- Game on Board (1936)
- Scandal at the Fledermaus (1936)
- Victoria in Dover (1936)
- The Beaver Coat (1937)
- Togger (1937)
- The Fourth Is Not Coming (1939)
- The Sensational Casilla Trial (1939)
- The Gasman (1941)
- Battle Squadron Lützow (1941)
- The Old Boss (1942)
- My Friend Josephine (1942)
- Melody of a Great City (1943)
- Germanin (1943)
- Tonelli (1943)
- The Black Robe (1944)
- Das fremde Leben (1951)

== Bibliography ==
- Fox, Jo. Film Propaganda in Britain and Nazi Germany: World War II Cinema. Berg, 2007.
- Welch, David. Propaganda and the German Cinema, 1933-1945. I.B.Tauris, 2001.
