= Geoffrey Skelton =

British author and translator

Geoffrey David Skelton (1916–1998) was a British author and translator. He specialized in German music, writing biographies of Richard Wagner, Cosima Wagner, Wieland Wagner and Paul Hindemith. He also translated numerous plays by leading German-language writers such as Bertolt Brecht, Max Frisch and Peter Weiss.

He won the Schlegel-Tieck Prize twice, the first one for his translation of Robert Lucas' biography of Frieda Lawrence and the second one for Siegfried Lenz's novel The Training Ground.

== Translations ==
- Frieda Lawrence by Robert Lucas
- Cosima Wagner's Diaries: A New Selection by Cosima Wagner
- Man in the Holocene by Max Frisch
- Sketchbook 1966–1971 by Max Frisch
- Selected Letters of Paul Hindemith by Paul Hindemith
- Bluebeard: A Tale by Max Frisch
- The Training Ground by Siegfried Lenz
- As You Were: A Farce by Johann Nestroy
- Arden Must Die, opera libretto by Erich Fried

== Co-translations ==
- Marat/Sade by Peter Weiss (co-translators: Gill Lamden, Geoffrey Skelton and Adrian Mitchell)
- Collected Plays: "St Joan", "Mother", "Lindbergh's Flight", "Baden-Baden", "He Said Yes", "Decision", "Exception" by Bertolt Brecht (co-translators: John Willett, Ralph Manheim and Geoffrey Skelton)
- Three Plays: "Fire Raisers", "Andorra", "Triptych" by Max Frisch (co-translators: Michael Peter Loeffler, Geoffrey Skelton and Michael Bullock)
- Die Walküre (The Valkyrie) (English National Opera Guide 21) by Richard Wagner (co-translators: Geoffrey Skelton, Barry Millington and George Gillespie)
- Cosima Wagner's Diaries, Vol. 2: 1878–1883 by Cosima Wagner (co-translators: Martin Gregor-Dellin, Dietrich Mack and Geoffrey Skelton)
- Living for Brecht: The Memoirs of Ruth Berlau by Ruth Berlau (co-translators: Hans Bunge and Geoffrey Skelton)
- The Persecution and Assassination of Marat as Performed By the Inmates of the Asylum of Charenton by Peter Weiss (co-translators: Geoffrey Skelton and Adrian Mitchell)

== Books ==
- Wieland Wagner. The Positive Sceptic (Gollancz, 1971)
- Paul Hindemith: The Man Behind the Music (Gollancz, 1975)
- Wagner at Bayreuth: Experiment and Tradition (Barrie & Rockcliffe, 1965; revised ed. 1976)
- Richard and Cosima Wagner: Biography of a Marriage (Gollancz, 1982)
- Wagner in Thought and Practice (Lime Tree, 1991)
