= Hastings Rashdall =

English academic and Anglican priest (1858–1924)

The Reverend Hastings Rashdall FBA
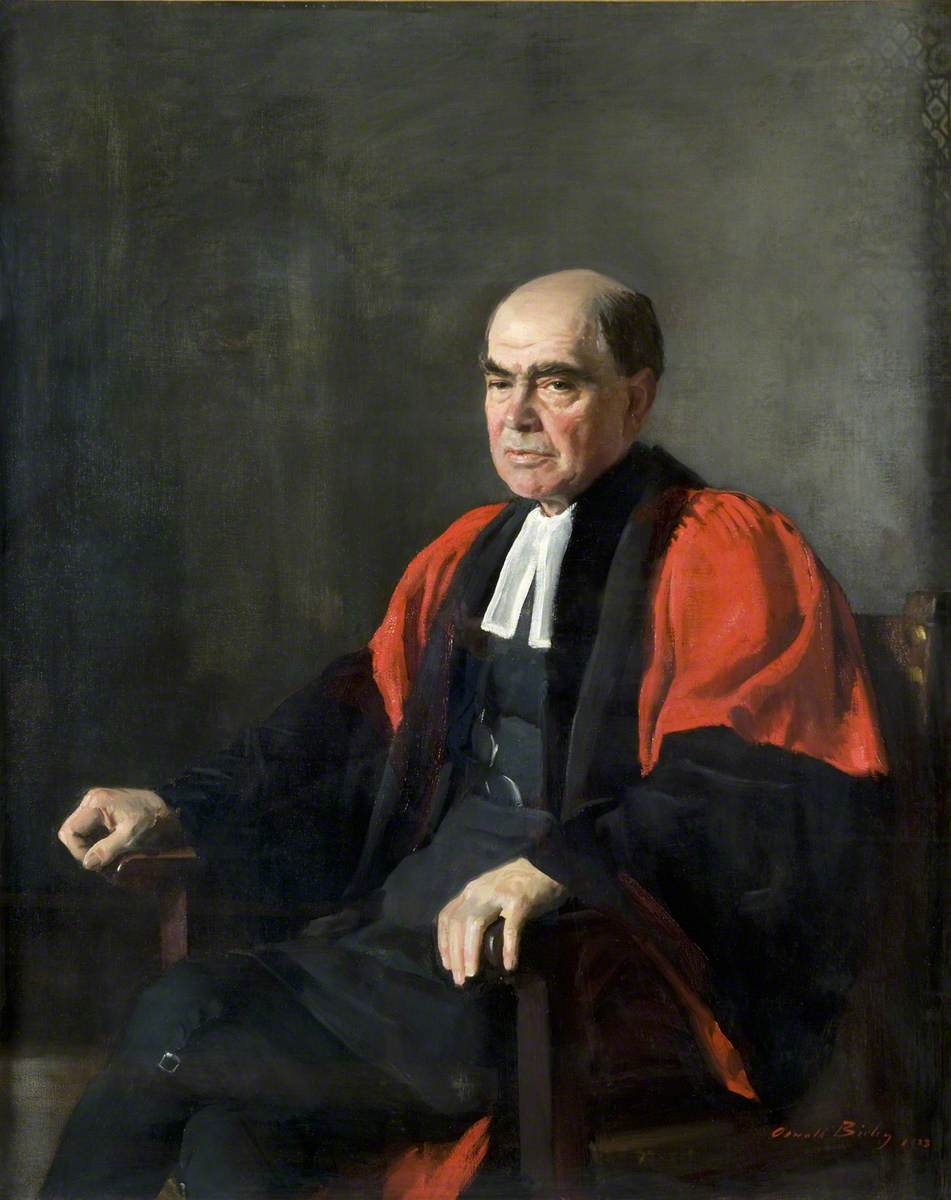
- Rashdall in 1923
- Born: 24 June 1858; London, England
- Died: 9 February 1924 (aged 65); Worthing, Sussex, England
- Spouse: Constance (m. 1905)

Ecclesiastical career
- Religion: Christianity (Anglican)
- Church: Church of England
- Ordained: 1884 (deacon); 1886 (priest)
- Offices held: Dean of Carlisle (1917–1924)

Academic background
- Education: New College, Oxford
- Academic advisor: T. H. Green
- Influences: J. B. Lightfoot; Henry Sidgwick

Academic work
- Discipline: History; philosophy; theology
- Sub-discipline: Medieval history; metaphysics; moral philosophy
- School or tradition: British idealism; theological liberalism
- Institutions: St David's College; University College, Durham; Hertford College, Oxford; New College, Oxford
- Notable works: The Theory of Good and Evil (1907)
- Notable ideas: Ideal utilitarianism
- Influenced: Henry Herbert Symonds

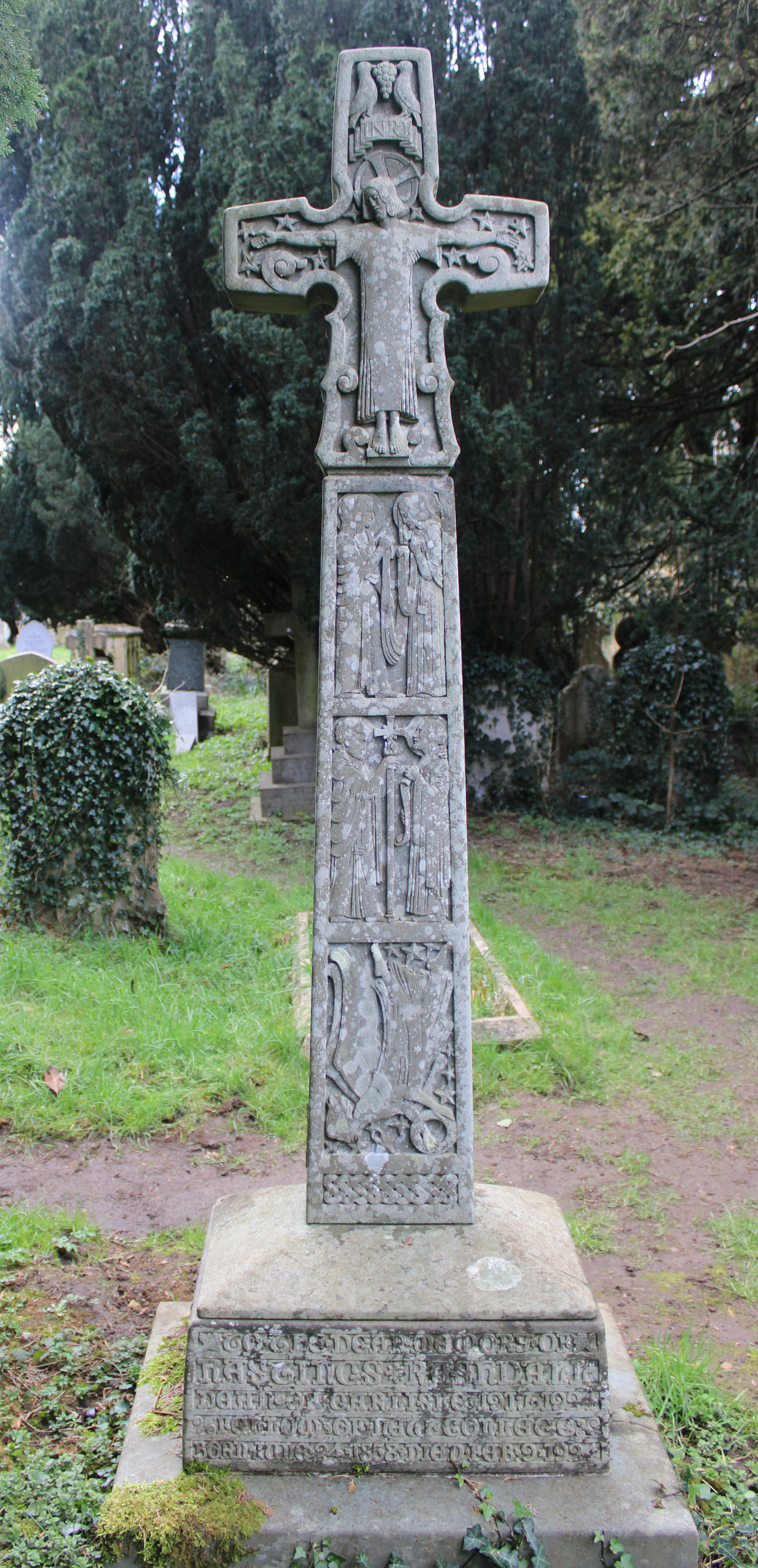
Holywell Cemetery, Oxford

Hastings Rashdall FBA (24 June 1858 – 9 February 1924) was an English philosopher, theologian, historian, and Anglican priest. He expounded a theory known as ideal utilitarianism, and he was a major historian of the universities of the Middle Ages. He argued for personal idealism and theistic finitism.

== Biography ==
Born in Kensington, London, on 24 June 1858, Rashdall was the son of an Anglican priest. He was educated at Harrow and received a scholarship for New College, Oxford. After short tenures at St David's University College and University College, Durham, Rashdall was made a Fellow of first Hertford College, Oxford, then New College, Oxford, and dedicates his main work, The Theory of Good and Evil (1907), to the memory of his teachers T. H. Green and Henry Sidgwick.

The dedication is appropriate, for the particular version of utilitarianism put forward by Rashdall owes elements to both Green and Sidgwick. Whereas he holds that the concepts of good and value are logically prior to that of right, he gives right a more than instrumental significance. His idea of good owes more to Green than to the hedonistic utilitarians. "The ideal of human life is not the mere juxtaposition of distinct goods, but a whole in which each good is made different by the presence of others." Rashdall has been eclipsed as a moral philosopher by G. E. Moore, who advocated similar views in his earlier work Principia Ethica (1903). Rashdall was also a Berkeleyan and advocated his own variant of personal idealism. He rejected absolute idealism and criticised other philosophers who identified God with the absolute. He argued that there can be no matter without a perceiving mind and that God is an infinite mind, ground of all things and the supreme personality. He argued for an anthropomorphic God that is limited in power to explain the problem of evil.

His historical study, The Universities of Europe in the Middle Ages, was described in the introduction to its recent reprinting as "one of the first comparative works on the subject" whose "scope and breadth has assured its place as a key work in intellectual history."

His The Idea of Atonement in Christian Theology surveyed different approaches to the Christian doctrine of atonement, concluding with an influential defence of the "subjective" theory of the atonement that Rashdall attributed to both Peter Abelard and Peter Lombard. Rashdall argued that the "objective" view of the atonement associated with Anselm of Canterbury was inadequate, and that the most authentically Christian doctrine was that Christ's life was a demonstration of God's love so profound that Christ was willing to die rather than compromise his character. This in turn inspires believers to emulate his character and his intimacy with the Father.

Rashdall may have coined the phrase "equality of opportunity".

Rashdall received the degree Doctor of Letters (DL) from New College, Oxford, in October 1901.

He was president of the Aristotelian Society from 1904 to 1907, a member of the Christian Social Union from its inception in 1890, and was an influential Anglican modernist theologian of the time, being appointed to a canonry in 1909.

He was Dean of Carlisle from 1917 to 1924, and died of cancer in Worthing on 9 February 1924. He is buried in Holywell Cemetery, Oxford.

== Selected works ==
- Rashdall, Hastings (2010) [1895]. The Universities of Europe in the Middle Ages, 2 vols. in 3 parts. Cambridge: Cambridge University Press [orig. Oxford: Clarendon Press]. ISBN 978-1-108-01813-5.
- Doctrine and Development: University Sermons (1898)
- New College (with Robert Rait, 1901)
- Christus in Ecclesia: Sermons on the Church and Its Institutions (1904)
- The Theory of Good and Evil (1907)
- Ethics (undated)
- Philosophy and Religion (1910)
- Is Conscience an Emotion? Three Lectures on Recent Ethical Theories (1914)
- Conscience and Christ: Six Lectures on Christian Ethics (1916)
- The Idea of Atonement in Christian Theology (London: Macmillan, 1919)
- The Moral Argument for Personal Immortality in King's College Lectures on Immortality (1920)
- God and Man 1930

== See also ==
- Moral influence theory of atonement

Church of England titles
Preceded by William Barker	Dean of Carlisle; 1917–1924	Succeeded by Henry Stuart
Academic offices
Preceded by George Edmundson	Bampton Lecturer; 1915	Succeeded by
Non-profit organization positions
Preceded by G. F. Stout	President of the Aristotelian Society; 1904–1907	Succeeded by Richard Haldane
Preceded by Percy Gardner	President of the Churchmen's Union; 1923–1924	Succeeded by William Ralph Inge
