= Morituri (1948 film) =

1948 film directed by Eugen York

- Original German poster
- Directed by: Eugen York
- Written by: Artur Brauner (idea); Gustav Kampendonk
- Produced by: Artur Brauner
- Starring: Walter Richter; Winnie Markus; Lotte Koch
- Cinematography: Werner Krien
- Edited by: Walter Wischniewsky
- Music by: Wolfgang Zeller
- Production company: CCC Film
- Distributed by: Schorcht Filmgesellschaft mbH
- Release date: 24 September 1948
- Running time: 88 minutes
- Country: Germany
- Language: German

Morituri is a 1948 German black-and-white drama film produced by Artur Brauner's CCC Film. The film was directed by Eugen York and starred Walter Richter, Winnie Markus and Lotte Koch. It features the onscreen debut of German actor Klaus Kinski as a Dutch concentration camp prisoner.

== Plot ==
As the end of the Second World War approaches and the Soviet Red Army is advancing, a group of concentration camp inmates is helped to escape by a Polish doctor. They hide in a wood where they meet other fugitives, who have been there for months, constantly in fear of being discovered. Out of fear of the German army patrols, they do not dare to leave the forest, even as the food supplies run low. The Polish doctor blows up a bridge, attracting the German troops' attention to the forest. The soldiers come perilously close to the hidden fugitives, but in the last moment have to retreat before the advance of Red Army units.

== Cast ==
- Walter Richter as Dr. Leon Bronek
- Winnie Markus as Maria Bronek
- Lotte Koch as Lydia
- Hilde Körber as Insane Woman
- Catja Görna as Stascha Sokol
- Josef Sieber as Eddy
- Carl-Heinz Schroth as Armand
- Siegmar Schneider as Gerhard Tenborg
- Peter Marx as Pjotr, Russian
- Alfred Cogho as Roy, Canadian
- Joseph Almas as Dr. Simon (as Josef Almas)
- Ellinor Saul-Gerlach as Lucie, his daughter (as Ellinor Saul)
- Ursula Bergmann as Ruth, his daughter
- Willy Prager as Father Simon
- Annemarie Hase as Mother Simon
- Karl Vibach as Georg, German Soldier
- Bob Kleinmann as Janek, 12 years
- Michael Günther as Wladek, 16 years
- Erich Dunskus as Sokol, Polish Farmer
- David Minster as The Invalid
- Franja Kamienietzka as Mrs Steppan
- Klaus Kinski as Dutch Prisoner

== Production ==
The title comes from the Latin expression Ave Imperator, morituri te salutant. Making this film was a very personal project for Artur Brauner. The script is based on an idea of his and this was only the second film made by his company CCC Film. Exteriors were shot near Berlin in Brandenburg, interiors at the Tempelhof Studios. Principal cinematography was from September 1947 to January 1948.

== Reception ==
The film was first shown on 28 August 1948 at the Venice Film Festival on the Lido di Venezia, Italy.

It premiered in the Waterloo-Theater, Hamburg, Germany on 24 September 1948. It was released at the Neues Scala Kino in Berlin on 16 November 1948. The film was a commercial disaster, with audiences hissing and booing. A theater in Hamburg was vandalized, after which other theater owners, fearful of reprisal by Nazi sympathizers, refused to show the film. It was called Freiwild in Austria.

Morituri was aired on German television station ZDF on 7 April 1991.

In 2009 Artur Brauner donated the film to Yad Vashem along with 20 other Holocaust-related films he had produced.
