= Alan Durband =

British educator (1927–1993)

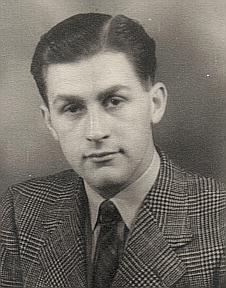
Alan Durband in 1946

Alan Durband (1927–1993) was an important figure in the education and arts community in Liverpool. He was head of English at the Liverpool Institute High School for Boys and was co-founder of the Liverpool Everyman Theatre.

== Early years and education ==
Alan Durband was born and raised in the poor inner city districts of the Dingle, Liverpool, (Drysdale Street) and Kensington (Esher Road), as the only child of a ship's carpenter, Joseph William Durband, who spent many months at sea on the 'banana boats' during the 1930s, leaving Alan in the care of his mother and aunts. His mother, Edith Durband (née Ashcroft), had come from a background ruined by the failure of the family horse-and-cart business in the late 1920s. She was particularly ambitious for her son, and even before he was born began making sacrifices and saving money from their modest income for the time when she might have to pay for a grammar school education. However, this was not needed, as Alan won a City scholarship from Matthew Arnold Junior School in the Dingle in 1938 and gained entrance to the prestigious Liverpool Institute High School for Boys, where he proved an excellent scholar, eventually being appointed to replace the Head Boy (accidentally killed in a school cricket match) in mid-year.

In 1946 he won a scholarship to Downing College, Cambridge, but this was delayed by 18 months of compulsory national service. Because of his pacifist beliefs, he refused to enter the armed forces, and as a conscientious objector he was instead assigned work in a coal mine. This experience later gave him his schoolteacher nickname "Dusty", aggravated his lifelong asthma, and strongly influenced his political views.

He began undergraduate life at Cambridge in September 1948; his tutor was the noted literary critic Frank Raymond Leavis, who had also been a conscientious objector (in World War I). He was much influenced by F R Leavis and his views on literary criticism. He graduated in 1951, did a year's post-graduate certificate of education, married (Audrey Atherton) in 1952 and began his career, briefly in Bolton, then in September 1953 returned to The Liverpool Institute as an English teacher, later (1956) becoming Head of the English Department.

== Teaching at the Liverpool Institute ==
His teaching work was mainly with the higher streamed, academically inclined boys and the Sixth Form, in preparation for Advanced (A) level English or for scholarship exams to Oxbridge, and his students generally achieved successful results. Durband later came to considerable public fame as the highly regarded Sixth Form teacher of A level English to Paul McCartney (1958–60) who achieved his pass in that subject.

Durband's teaching style was imaginative and engaging, displaying his enthusiasm for the subject and praising individual achievements. His discipline was strict but humane and he never resorted to the physical punishments so common in the school. All the plays were read aloud by pupils in class with dramatic flair encouraged. McCartney himself commented that he loved the way that Durband cut down the stories to expose their most basic themes, therefore simplifying them so as to be easily understood. He played a central role in directing school plays and staged them with imagination and 'modern' interpretations: ' The Rivals' in 1958 (with incidental music composed by John McCabe); 'St. Joan' in 1960, 'Servant of Two Masters' in 1962. Expansion of post secondary education and the uncertainties of the future of Grammar schools led several experienced teachers to leave the Liverpool Institute School after the departure of the Headmaster John Robert Edwards in 1961. Durband was appointed to the C.F. Mott College of Education, Huyton, Merseyside in 1962, eventually becoming Head of English.

== Texts, plays and theatre ==
Durband's experience in the classroom led him to write a series of textbooks entitled 'English Workshop' which had commenced at his desk in Room 32, (published in 1959) and proved popular in classrooms throughout the country. He also wrote a series of student guides, 'Shakespeare Made Easy' – each volume a complete play, the original on one side and the same verse in modern English on the other. These were published from 1986 on.

Alongside his career and his writing, he was an avid promoter of the development and production of new drama & plays in collections entitled: 'New Directions in English', 1961; 'Contemporary English', 1962; 'Playbill', 1969 on; 'Prompt', 1973 on; and 'Wordplays' containing writers such as Alan Ayckbourn, Tom Stoppard, Willy Russell, Brian Jacques, Alan Bleasdale, George Friel & John Mortimer, etc.

According to Jacques, Durband also passed along the original manuscript of his novel Redwall to a publisher.

Durband was also a motivating force behind the creation and renovation of The Everyman Theatre on Hope Street, Liverpool which opened in 1964 and earlier he had attempted with Sam Wanamaker to revive 'The New Shakespeare' as a supper club until its mysterious destructive fire in 1959.

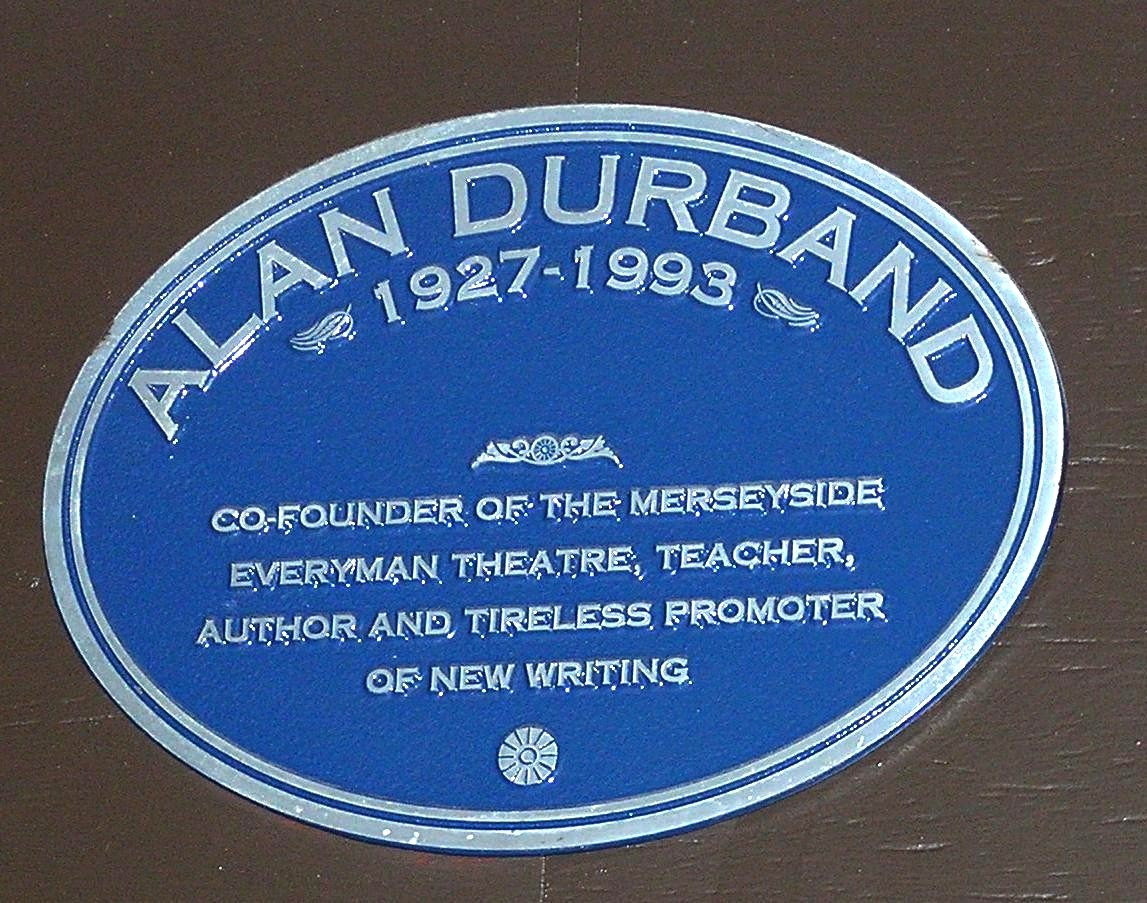
Plaque, Everyman theatre foyer

He served for nearly 30 years as vice-chair, chair and vice-president of the Theatre Board raising thousands of pounds by means of innovative seven-year tax-free covenants for the conversion of the building. It was a popular theatre specialising in local Liverpool settings & political subjects which gave opportunities to new playwrights – most famous of whom is probably Willy Russell (to whom Durband lent his Welsh cottage to write 'Educating Rita') and to actors such as: Bill Nighy, Pete Postlethwaite, Jonathan Pryce & Julie Walters who joined the Theatre company around 1975.

To mark this era, Willy Russell unveiled a plaque in memory of Alan Durband at the theatre in 1998 in the company of actor Pete Postlethwaite who acknowledged a great personal debt to his time spent on the stage at The Everyman.

== Views and styles ==
Durband was an atheist, and like his mother, a committed socialist and a supporter of left-wing, progressive causes. He was the Communist Party candidate for school elections in 1946 and he withdrew (at the Head's suggestion) in favour of the Labour candidate "to prove the value of the united left". [Source: School Mag. Feb. 1946].

His ideas were to evolve into an unusual combination of beliefs and experiences. His acute social conscience seemed to lie easily alongside a love of life with all its joys: of good food, wine and clothes, comfortable houses and luxury cars, made possible only by his entrepreneurial bent and an extremely strong work ethic which produced a steady flow of royalty payments from several decades of sales of his study guides in Britain and the United States. As an entry in the School Magazine (July 1962) announcing his departure, put it: "nestling in his briefcase alongside L5A's exercises were the latest brochures on refrigerators, washing machines, caravanserai, nuclear disarmament, brilliant new textbooks, and resurrections of long defunct amphitheatres". An obituary in the Liverpool Daily Post on 13 March 1993 said "His influence lives on in the minds of the boys he taught and the strength of popular theatrical productions in Liverpool".

He became a Justice of the Peace, (J.P.) in Liverpool in 1974 and is survived by his wife, Audrey, and his son, Mark, and daughter, Amanda.

== Afterword ==
With the financial support of former pupil Paul McCartney, the old Liverpool Institute school building on Mount St. was saved and its interior transformed into LIPA, The Liverpool Institute for Performing Arts in 1996. It is particularly apt that his old English teacher's Classroom 32 was designated & plaqued as 'The Alan Durband Room'. Overlooking the school at the top of Mount Street at Hope Street is a sculpture ("A Case History" by John King, 1998) which depicts Durband's old briefcase cast in concrete.

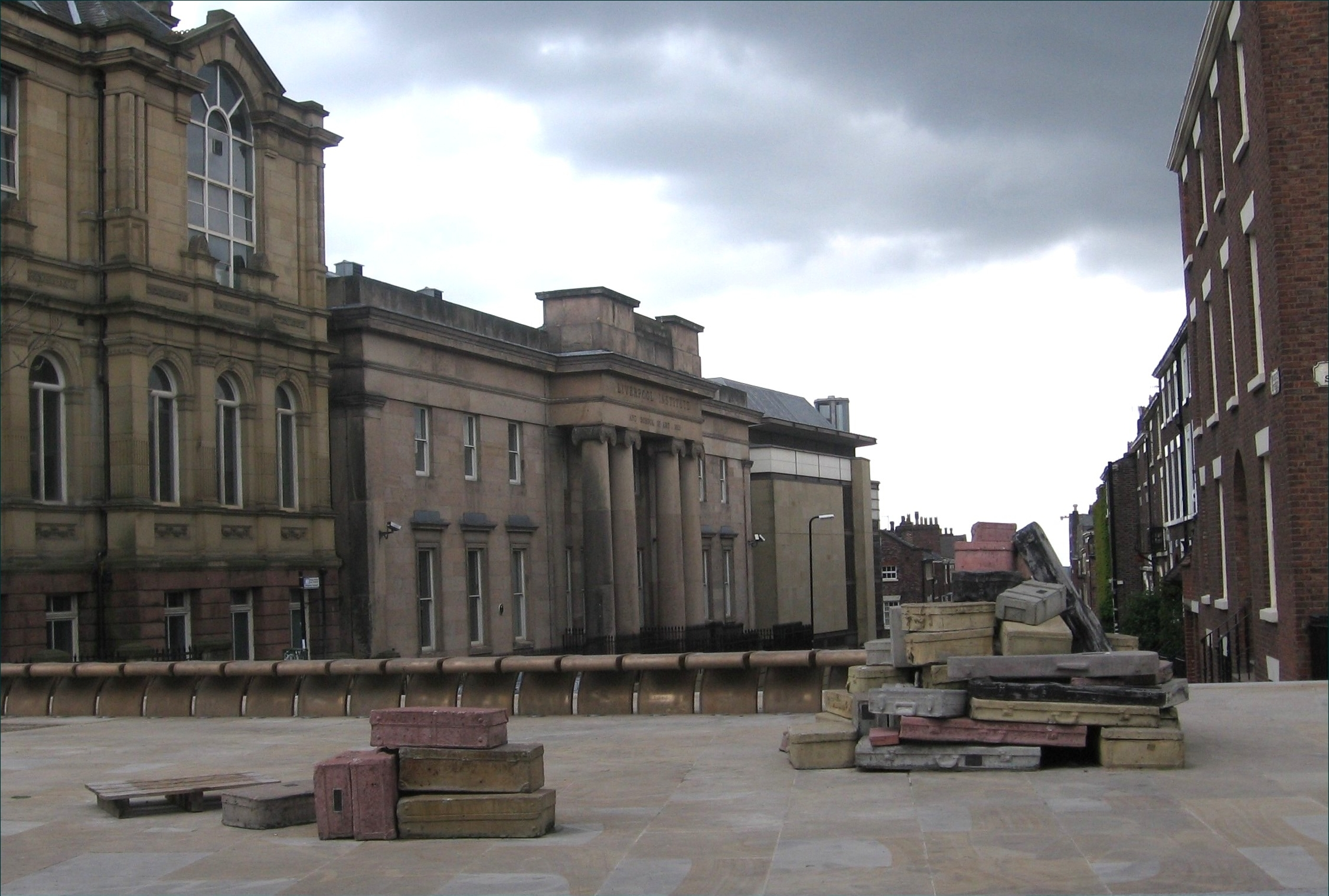
The case of Alan Durband is on top, at left.

== Sources ==
- Dave Lang," Scrutiny to Subcultures: notes on litereray criticism and popular music", Popular Music, Vol. 13, No. 2, Mellers at 80 (May 1994), pp. 179–190. JSTOR 853211
- Merkin, Ros (Compiled by), Liverpool's Third Cathedral: The Liverpool Everyman Theatre, 2004
- Spitz, Bob (2006). The Beatles: The Biography. Little, Brown and Company (New York). ISBN 1-84513-160-6.
