= Lindley Fraser =

Fraser in 1948

Lindley Macnaghten Fraser (14 August 1904 – 10 March 1963) was a Scottish academic, author, broadcaster and economist.

After an academic career, during which he successfully switched from classics to economics, holding university posts in America, England and Scotland, Fraser was recruited by the BBC to join, and later head, its German service, in which his broadcasts to listeners in Nazi Germany won him a large following.

== Life and career ==
=== Early years ===
Fraser was born in Edinburgh, the son of Norman Fraser, a minister of the United Free Church of Scotland, and of his wife, Cecilia Craigie Fraser. He was educated first at George Watson's College, Edinburgh, and when the family moved to Liverpool in 1913 he went to the Liverpool Institute High School. From there he won a scholarship to Balliol College, Oxford, where he took a first class degree in classics. In 1925 he was elected treasurer of the Oxford Union, becoming librarian and then president the following year. In 1926 and 1927 he was appointed to visiting fellowships at Princeton University and the Brookings School of Economics in Washington, D.C., receiving a doctorate from the latter.

Returning to Oxford in 1925, Fraser became fellow and praelector in economics at Queen's College. Many of his pupils later distinguished themselves; among them was the future prime minister, Harold Wilson. In 1932, Fraser married Elspet Mackenzie (b. 1907/8), daughter of Dr. Samuel Ridley Mackenzie of Montreal, Quebec, Canada. They had two daughters.

In 1935, Fraser was appointed Jaffrey professor of political economy at Aberdeen University. During his time at Aberdeen he wrote Economic Thought and Language (1937), which gave a systematic analysis of the terminology of economic analysis, and was translated into several languages.

=== Broadcaster ===
On the outbreak of the Second World War, Fraser was sought out by his friend and former Oxford colleague, Frederick Ogilvie, the Director General of the BBC, who persuaded him to join the BBC German Service. Aberdeen University reluctantly granted him leave of absence and he began broadcasting for the BBC in February 1940. He spoke German fluently and clearly but with a distinct Edinburgh accent which won him a large following among listeners in Nazi Germany. By the end of the war he had become "a national institution" to his German audience.

Believing that the BBC's German service could play a valuable part in the rebuilding of postwar Germany, Fraser resigned his chair at Aberdeen in 1945. In the same year his first marriage was dissolved. He was appointed director of the German service in 1947 and head of German programmes in February 1948. His biographer, Richard Hewlett, wrote that Fraser's frequent visits to the Federal Republic of Germany and his continued, regular broadcasts "made him widely known and respected throughout the German-speaking countries of Europe."

Fraser was appointed OBE in 1958. In March 1959 he married Elizabeth Scott, née Marks, a sculptor. He died of lung cancer in London in 1963 at the age of 58.

== Bibliography ==
- 1932, Protection and Free Trade
- 1937, Economic Thought and Language: a Critique of Some Fundamental Economic Concepts, Hardcover Publisher: A. & C. Black
- 1945, Germany Between Two Wars a Study of Propaganda and War-Guilt, Hard Cover Publisher: Oxford U.P.,
- 1957, Propaganda, Publisher: Oxford University Press, London
