= Rubble film =

Film genre

A rubble film (German: Trümmerfilm) is a movie characterized by its use of location exteriors among the "rubble" of bombed-down Western and Eastern European cities to capture the gritty, depressing reality of the lives of the civilian survivors in the early post-World War II years. It reflected an aesthetic choice to show rather than hide the extensive damage, and broken lives, left by the war. Rubble films were mainly made by filmmakers in the rebuilding film industries of Eastern Europe, Italy and the former Nazi Germany.

No films were made in the immediate aftermath of the war, as result of the combination of the destruction or seizure of Germany's film studios; artistic uncertainty; limited interest in film viewing; and lack of appropriate cinema facilities to show them. This uncertainty was caused by Hitler's delegitimization of conventional filmmaking practices, which forced filmmakers to reinvent their filmography methods, and film content. It was not until Wolfgang Staudte released The Murderers Are Among Us in 1946 that German cinema began to further develop.

== Topics addressed ==
- Problems of returning soldiers
- The poverty, suffering and distress in post-war Germany
- Stunde Null, "Zero Hour", the capitulation of Germany in May 1945 and the immediately following weeks
- Confrontation with the past, particularly with issues of collective guilt
- Crime and punishment
- War damage and war losses
- Life among the rubble
- Reconstruction

== The aesthetic ==
The desolation left as a consequence of the bombing that Germany endured before the end of World War II left the major German cities in shambles. However, unlike other cities, Berlin's structures had steel frames. This enabled many of them to remain standing, despite the bombings. This left jagged figures on the landscape, as well as enormous swaths of rubble on the ground. Often, directors would have either horizontal or vertical shots of the rubble from a low angle. The Murderers Are Among Us begins with a ground shot facing upwards showing a Berlin street, complete with piles of rubble, and destroyed buildings. The viewer sees several children running around, and the protagonist ambling up the street. The viewer also sees German citizens working together to clean up, and getting on with their lives, despite the devastation. Critics have observed similarities between the rubble film aesthetic and Weimar era Expressionism, as well as Romanticism. These features include gloomy environments, canted angles and chiaroscuro lighting, along with morally ambiguous protagonists. It has been argued by Gertrud Koch that, aside from the expressionist and Neorealistic qualities of the Rubble Film, a major purpose of these films was to re-invigorate the German people, and instill a work ethic that would facilitate the reconstruction of Germany.

== Reception ==
Originally, the name "Trümmerfilm" held negative connotation. These films were seen as a symbol of defeat and desolation. They symbolized the control that the Nazis had over the German people, as well as the success of the Allies in destroying their country. Instead of offering a nostalgic attachment to what Germany was, it simply was a mark of trauma and despair. The German identity had been stripped by the Nazi party, and they felt that these films did little more than re-affirm the horrors that Germany suffered.

The genre has also received criticism for its whitewashing of Nazi history. In the film The Murderers Are Among Us, the female protagonist Susanne returns from a concentration camp, but the audience never learns why she was there - presumably for being an artist. A common trope in the rubble films is the highlighting of German soldiers' trauma at the expense of relegating the suffering of political and racial enemies of the Third Reich. The omission of any depictions of Nazi violence in a genre so consumed with expressing suffering is a criticized feature of the Heimkehrerfilm, a genre centered around returning veterans' trauma and re-adjustment to civilian life.

== Notable films ==
- Die Mörder sind unter uns (1946)
- Irgendwo in Berlin (1946)
- Ehe im Schatten (1947)
- ... Und über uns der Himmel (1947)
- Razzia (1947)
- Zwischen gestern und morgen (1947)
- Und finden dereinst wir uns wieder (1947)
- In jenen Tagen (1947)
- Straßenbekanntschaft (1948)
- Lang ist der Weg (1948)
- Germania anno zero (1948)
- Morituri (1948)
- Film ohne Titel (1948)
- Und wieder 48 (1948)
- Die Affaire Blum (1948)
- Der Apfel ist ab (1948)
- Berliner Ballade (1948)
- Liebe '47 (1949)
- Der Ruf (1949)
- Der Verlorene (1951)

A Foreign Affair (1948), The Search (1948), The Third Man (1949), The Big Lift (1950), and The Man Between (1953) are examples of British or Hollywood films of the same period with European directors who made innovative use of location shooting of German and Austrian rubble.
