= Immensee =

Immensee may refer to:

- Immensee railway station, a railway station on the Gotthard railway line in Switzerland
- Immensee (village), one of three villages in Küssnacht, Switzerland
- Immensee (novella) (1848), a novella by German author Theodor Storm
- Immensee (film) (1943), a German film directed by Veit Harlan
