= Serenade (1937 film) =

- Directed by: Willi Forst
- Written by: Curt J. Braun; Willi Forst
- Based on: Viola Tricolor; 1874 novella by Theodor Storm
- Produced by: Herbert Engelsing; Willi Forst
- Starring: Hilde Krahl; Albert Matterstock; Igo Sym
- Cinematography: Werner Bohne
- Edited by: Hans Wolff
- Music by: Peter Kreuder
- Production company: Deutsche Forst-Filmproduktion
- Distributed by: Tobis Film; Sascha Film (Austria)
- Release date: 26 November 1937
- Running time: 110 minutes
- Country: Germany
- Language: German

Serenade is a 1937 German drama film directed by Willi Forst and starring Hilde Krahl, Albert Matterstock and Igo Sym. The film was based on a novel by Theodor Storm, which was adapted again in 1958 as I'll Carry You in My Arms by Veit Harlan.

The film's sets were designed by the art director Kurt Herlth and Werner Schlichting.

== Cast ==
- Hilde Krahl as Irene - Burgstallers Nichte
- Albert Matterstock as Gustl Hollmann
- Igo Sym as Ferdinand Lohner - 1st Violin
- Walter Janssen as Alfred Ritter, 2nd Violin
- Fritz Odemar as P.M. Dörffner, Bratsche
- Hans Junkermann as Johann Burgstaller, Cello
- Lina Lossen as Frau Leuthoff
- Klaus Detlef Sierck as Heinz, Lohners Sohn
- Eduard von Winterstein as Der Dorfarzt
- Josef Eichheim as Gruber, Orchesterdiener
- Paul Rehkopf as Franz, Kutscher
- Erich Dunskus as Der Künsthändler
- Toni Tetzlaff as Die Vermieterin
- Toni Staffner as Anna, the maid
- Margarete Henning-Roth as Eine Kellnerin
- Lily Rodien as Das Gemälde zeigt
- Schorchl Holl as Loisl - Jagdgehilfe
- Hilde Seipp as Singer
- Valerie Borstel as Gast bei Irene
- Hans Hanauer as Feuerwehrhauptmann
- Karl Jüstel as Zuhörer beim Konzert
- Susi Lembach as Gast bei Irene
- Theodor Thony as Pariser Hotelportier

== Bibliography ==
- Bock, Hans-Michael & Bergfelder, Tim. The Concise Cinegraph: Encyclopaedia of German Cinema. Berghahn Books, 2009.
