= I'll Carry You in My Arms (1958 film) =

1958 film

- Directed by: Veit Harlan
- Written by: Guido Fürst; Veit Harlan
- Based on: Viola Tricolor; 1874 novella by Theodor Storm
- Produced by: Alfred Bittins
- Starring: Kristina Söderbaum; Hans Holt; Hans Nielsen
- Cinematography: Gerhard Krüger
- Edited by: Klaus Eckstein
- Music by: Werner Eisbrenner
- Production company: Arca-Filmproduktion
- Distributed by: Constantin Film
- Release date: 6 November 1958
- Running time: 92 minutes
- Country: West Germany
- Language: German

I'll Carry You in My Arms or I'll Carry You on My Hands (German: Ich werde dich auf Händen tragen) is a 1958 West German drama film directed by Veit Harlan and starring Kristina Söderbaum, Hans Holt and Hans Nielsen. It was based on the novella Viola Tricolor by Theodor Storm, which had previously been made in 1937 as Serenade. It was the final film of Harlan's career.

The film's sets were designed by the art director Ernst H. Albrecht. It was shot using Agfacolor at the Pichelberg Studios in Berlin and on location in Florence and Holstein.

== Cast ==
- Kristina Söderbaum as Ines Thormälen
- Hans Holt as Rudolf Asmus
- Hans Nielsen as Dr. Compagnuolo
- Barbara Haller as Nesi
- Hilde Körber as Anne
- Monika Dahlberg as Pia
- Günter Pfitzmann as Georg
- Frank von dem Bottlenberg as Giacomo
- Malte Jaeger as Geistlicher im Zug

== Bibliography ==
- Bock, Hans-Michael & Bergfelder, Tim. The Concise CineGraph. Encyclopedia of German Cinema. Berghahn Books, 2009.
- Noack, Frank. Veit Harlan: The Life and Work of a Nazi Filmmaker. University Press of Kentucky, 2016.
