= The Blue Hour (1953 film) =

1953 film

- Directed by: Veit Harlan
- Written by: Veit Harlan
- Starring: Kristina Söderbaum; Hans Nielsen; Kurt Kreuger
- Cinematography: Werner Krien
- Edited by: Walter Boos
- Music by: Franz Grothe
- Production company: Komet-Film
- Distributed by: Panorama-Film
- Release date: 5 March 1953
- Running time: 100 minutes
- Country: West Germany
- Language: German

The Blue Hour (German: Die blaue Stunde) is a 1953 West German comedy film directed by Veit Harlan and starring Kristina Söderbaum, Hans Nielsen and Kurt Kreuger. Production began on the film in October 1952. It was shot at the Göttingen Studios and on location on the island of Capri. The film's sets were designed by the art director Walter Haag. Because of public protests against his wartime role as a Nazi filmmaker, Harlan considered turning over the project to his colleague Geza von Bolvary but eventually decided to direct it himself.

It was the third film of a post-war comeback for the husband and wife team Harlan and Söderbaum, but was much less commercially successful than the two previous films, the melodramas Immortal Beloved and Hanna Amon.

== Cast ==
- Kristina Söderbaum as Angelika
- Hans Nielsen as Paul
- Kurt Kreuger as Dulong
- Paulette Andrieux as Lou
- Harald Juhnke as Fred
- Renate Feuereisen as Mariechen
- Jakob Tiedtke as Portier
- Otto Gebühr as Geheimrat Jordan
- Charlotte Scheier-Herold
- Esther Gramsch
- Hans Hermann Schaufuß

== Bibliography ==
- Noack, Frank. Veit Harlan: The Life and Work of a Nazi Filmmaker. University Press of Kentucky, 2016.
