= Viola Tricolor (novella) =

1874 novella by Theodor Storm

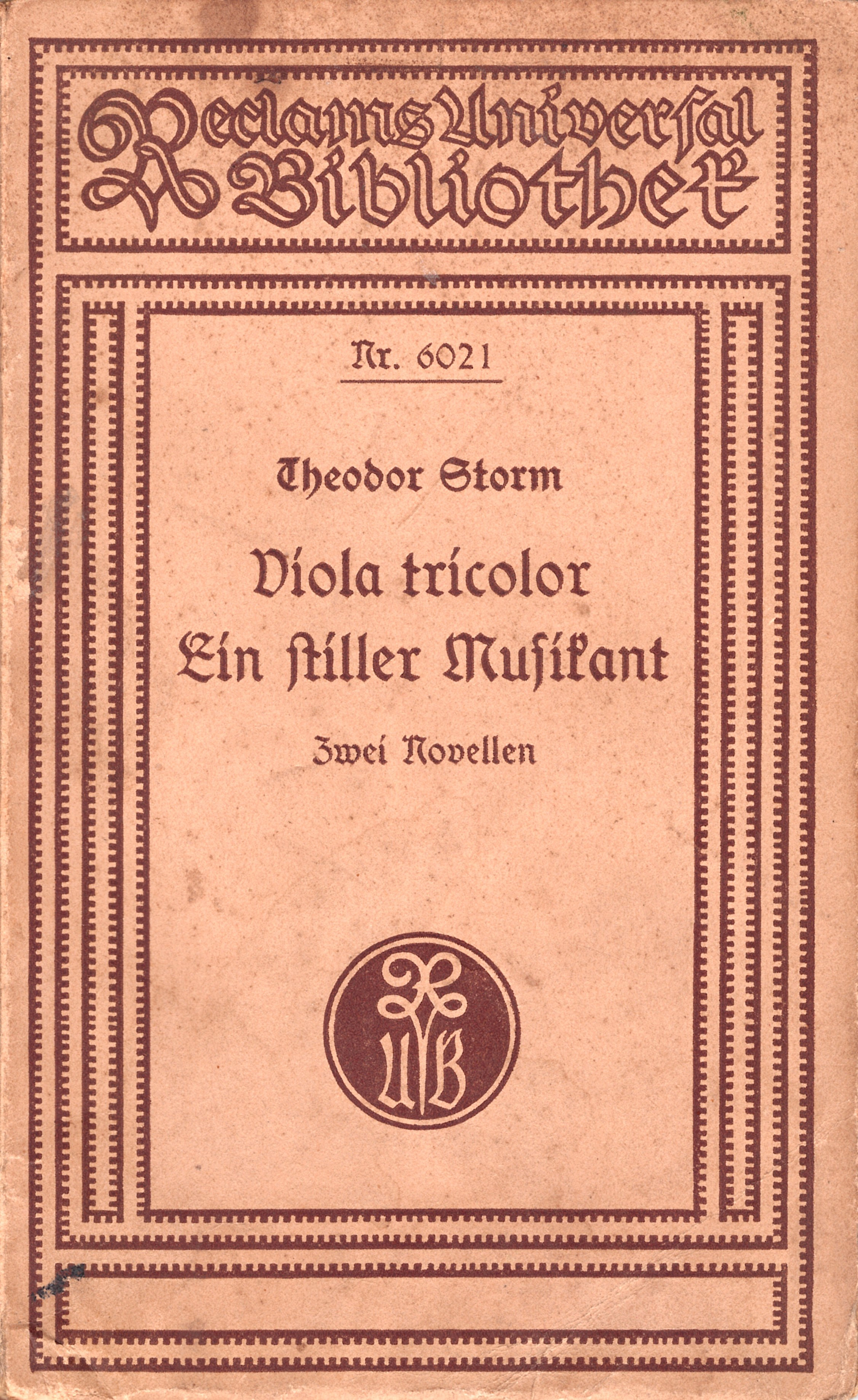

Viola Tricolor is an 1874 novella by the German writer Theodor Storm. It tells the story of a man who remarries after his wife has died, and how the new woman feels insufficient in her role as wife and mother to her step-daughter. The novella was first serialised in the journal Westermanns Monatshefte. An English translation by Bayard Quincy Morgan was published in 1956, most recently reissued by Alma Books in 2025.

== Adaptations ==
The novella has been adapted for film twice. Willi Forst's Serenade was released in 1938. Veit Harlan's I'll Carry You in My Hands stars Kristina Söderbaum, Hans Holt and Hans Nielsen and was released in 1958.
