= Immensee (film) =

1943 film

- Directed by: Veit Harlan
- Screenplay by: Alfred Braun, Veit Harlan
- Based on: Immensee by Theodor Storm
- Produced by: Erich Holder
- Starring: Kristina Söderbaum; Carl Raddatz; Paul Klinger
- Music by: Wolfgang Zeller
- Production company: UFA
- Release date: 17 December 1943 (Berlin)
- Running time: 88 minutes
- Country: Nazi Germany
- Language: German
- Budget: 2,059,000 ℛ︁ℳ︁
- Box office: 4,305,000 ℛ︁ℳ︁

Immensee: ein deutsches Volkslied (English: Immensee: A German Folksong) is a 1943 German melodrama film directed by Veit Harlan, loosely based on the popular novella Immensee (1849) by Theodor Storm. It was commercially successful and, with its theme of a woman remaining faithful to her husband, was important in raising the morale of German forces; it remained popular after WWII.

== Plot ==
Elisabeth (Kristina Söderbaum) falls in love with Reinhardt (Carl Raddatz), but he leaves their native village to study music, travel the world and build his career as a composer. His most important compositions are inspired by his love for her, Twelve Songs of Elisabeth and Seerosen (water lilies, the couple's special flower), but after she visits him on the day of his final examination at the conservatoire and finds a strange woman asleep in his bed, Elisabeth marries Erich (Paul Klinger), the wealthy heir to the estate of Immensee. Reinhardt returns to win her back, and Erich releases her, telling her that all that he wants is for her to be happy. This causes Elisabeth to realise what love really means and she tells Erich for the first time that she loves him, and remains with him. In the frame story, many years have passed, Erich is dead and Elisabeth and Reinhardt, who is now a renowned composer, meet for tea at his hotel after a performance of his Seerosen; at the end of the film, she tells him she will remain true to Erich and to Immensee, and he leaves for the last time.

The film is loosely based on Theodor Storm's novella of the same title. The scene where Elisabeth finds a woman in Reinhardt's bed had been omitted from the novella on the advice of friends of the author, and two thirds of the novella takes place in Elisabeth and Reinhardt's childhood; instead of using child actors, Harlan chose to cut these scenes and artificially age the two lovers for different stages of their lives (from about 18 to 45 for Elisabeth). Both Söderbaum and Raddatz were 31 at the time of filming. Despite being subtitled Ein deutsches Volkslied (a German folksong), the film also omits a conversation about folksongs which is important in the novella, in which Erich is dismissive but Reinhardt expounds a German Romanticist view entirely in accord with National Socialism, that "[Folksongs are] not made at all; they grow, they fall out of the sky" and refers to a melody sung by a shepherd as Urtöne (ancient tones) which "sleep on forest floors; God knows who found them."

== Themes ==
The character of Elisabeth is presented as a model of "German fidelity" and the sanctity of marriage, and also of sacrifice, as often in Nazi images of women. As a secondary thematic focus common in many Nazi films, the film contrasts country life and rootedness with internationality and urban sophistication, to the detriment of the latter. The Illustrierte Film-Kurier summarised: "[Elisabeth] stays at home, deeply rooted and always strong in the homely countryside, which her whole heart is attached to"; Reinhardt is pulled away by "music and the world." After Elisabeth finds a girl in Reinhardt's bed, his landlady explains, "These are artists. . . they are more liberal in these matters." After an affair with an opera singer in Rome, Reinhardt realises that he really loves Elisabeth—who in this instance represents his homeland, Germany. Conversely Erich represents the homeland for Elisabeth. At one point Elisabeth is shown swimming naked in the lake, portraying healthy outdoor life.

== Production ==
Immensee was shot primarily in Holstein, on alternating days with Opfergang, to save money on colour production; Harlan's previous film, Die goldene Stadt, had been very expensive. Originally he proposed to shoot three films simultaneously using the same principals and mostly the same locations and sets, but the third, Pole Poppenspäler, another novella by Storm, was dropped. Additional exteriors were shot in Rome. Joseph Goebbels was so pleased with Die goldene Stadt that he did not interfere with the production of Immensee, and Harlan wrote in 1974: "Of all the films that I made during the war, this was the only one which remained true to the original scenarios and was distributed just as I had foreseen." He said that he filmed the novella "to reflect his love for his wife", Söderbaum; she and Raddatz, who played Reinhardt in Immensee and Albrecht in Opfergang, believed that both films were successful with the public because of the genuine chemistry between them. Söderbaum received 60,000 ℛ︁ℳ︁ for her work on the film, three times as much as Raddatz.

== Reception ==
Immensee was highly successful, making a profit of 4,305,000 ℛ︁ℳ︁ on an investment of 2,059,000 ℛ︁ℳ︁; it made 800,000 ℛ︁ℳ︁ in its first month and with a longer run, would likely have overtaken Die goldene Stadt as the all-time leading moneymaker among German films. It was seen by more than 8 million people within the original borders of the Reich. At a time when German forces were greatly concerned about the fidelity of their womenfolk left at home, the film was "one of the most important cinematic contributions to front-line morale". As part of the front and home-front morale effort, it was specially distributed to locations where there was no cinema. Söderbaum received many letters from men at the front; she said in a 1993 interview: "The soldiers were homesick at the front. And the girl I played was an ideal for them. She loved her husband and was faithful to him. I still get letters today." Klaus Jebens, who had been a young soldier in 1943, remembered the film so fondly that in 1975 he bought the estate on Lake Plön where shooting had taken place, and was still living there twenty years later. In 1993 he said: "It was very depressing. It was wartime. The whole world was . . . destroyed and then we saw this film with this unfulfilled love."

In an assessment of Söderbaum's career following her death, a reviewer judged Immensee to be probably her finest work, providing "the indispensable grain of believability and grounding" for Harlan's "excessive filmic phantasies" and the unmoving centre holding the film together against the "centrifugal forces" set up by the externalisation of the novella's internal narrative, with the Roman scenes and their "explicitly stated association between Italian architecture and German music" pulling the focus away from the Holstein setting. Postwar assessments of the film itself have been mixed. Louis Marcorelles saw it as "a film of peace and love . . . convey[ing] a strong feeling for nature and a fervent idyllic mood"; David Stewart Hull, in his 1969 survey of Film in the Third Reich, said it was "still successful. It has been frequently revived and its original power remains undiminished." In 1989 Norbert Grob, calling for a re-evaluation of the director's legacy, referred to it as one of eight "melodramatic masterpieces" by Harlan that merit study as cinematic texts. However, Christa Bandmann and Joe Hembus, in their 1980 survey of "classics of German sound film", find in it "plodding sentimentality" and sum up the message as: "At this time—it's 1943—a German woman waits, is true to her husband, and does without." Richard J. Rundell writes of "weepy sentimentality" and says that "the saccharine tone is made far worse by Wolfgang Zeller's bombastic musical score." Antje Ascheid finds Elisabeth "an unremarkable and dull character" and sums up the film as "[speaking] to contemporary audiences by reflecting a mood of resignation and depression", its "ideological fatalism" an increasingly common response in Nazi culture to the worsening wartime situation.

== Awards ==
- Prädikat (Propaganda Ministry award of distinction): Artistic Value (künstlerisch wertvoll)
- Prädikat: National Value (volkstümlich wertvoll)
- Prädikat: Cultural Value (kulturell wertvoll)
