= George Putnam Upton =

American journalist and author (1834–1919)

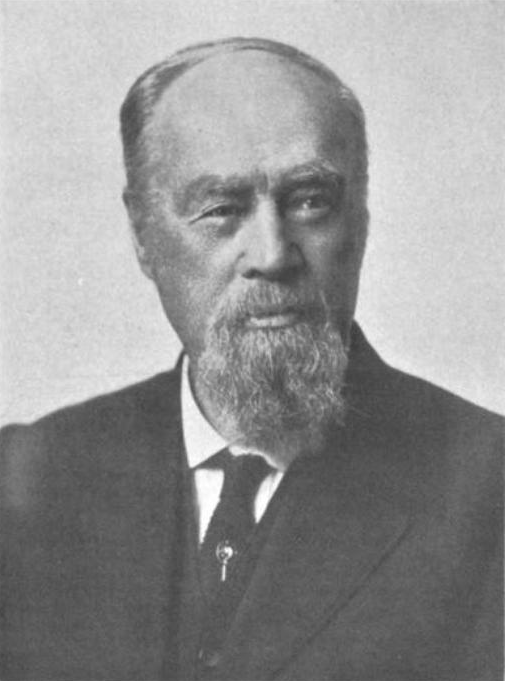
- Born: October 25, 1834; Roxbury, Massachusetts
- Died: May 19, 1919 (aged 84); Chicago, Illinois
- Resting place: Oak Woods Cemetery
- Education: Brown University
- Occupations: Journalist, writer, translator
- Spouses: Sara E. Bliss (m. 1861) Georgiana S. Wood (m. 1880)

George Putnam Upton (October 25, 1834 – May 19, 1919) was an American journalist and author. He also translated numerous works of German literature.

== Biography ==
George Putnam Upton was born in Roxbury, Massachusetts, on October 25, 1834. He took an MA at Brown University in 1854, and soon after started writing for newspapers in Chicago. In 1862, Upton became the music critic for the Chicago Tribune. He became the senior editor at the Tribune in 1881 and remained in the post until 1905. A. C. McClurg & Co. published several of his books.

He married Sara E. Bliss in 1861. He remarried on September 21, 1880, to Georgiana S. Wood.

Upton died from pneumonia at his home in Chicago on May 19, 1919. He was interred at Oak Woods Cemetery.

== Select bibliography ==
- The standard oratorios: their stories, their music, and their composers; a handbook (1866)
- Letters of Peregrine Pickle (1869)
- Woman in music (1880)
- The standard operas, their plots and their music (1885)
- The standard operas: their plots, their music, and their composers (1886)
- The standard cantatas; their stories, their music, and their composers; a handbook (1887)
- The standard symphonies, their history, their music, and their composers; a handbook (1888)
- Musical Pastels (1902)
- Theodore Thomas: A Musical Autobiography (editor) (1905)
- Immensee by Theodor Storm (translated) (1907)
- Musical memories : my recollections of celebrities of the half century, 1850-1900 (1908)
- The standard concert guide (1909)
