= Ekke Nekkepenn =

North Frisian legendary figure

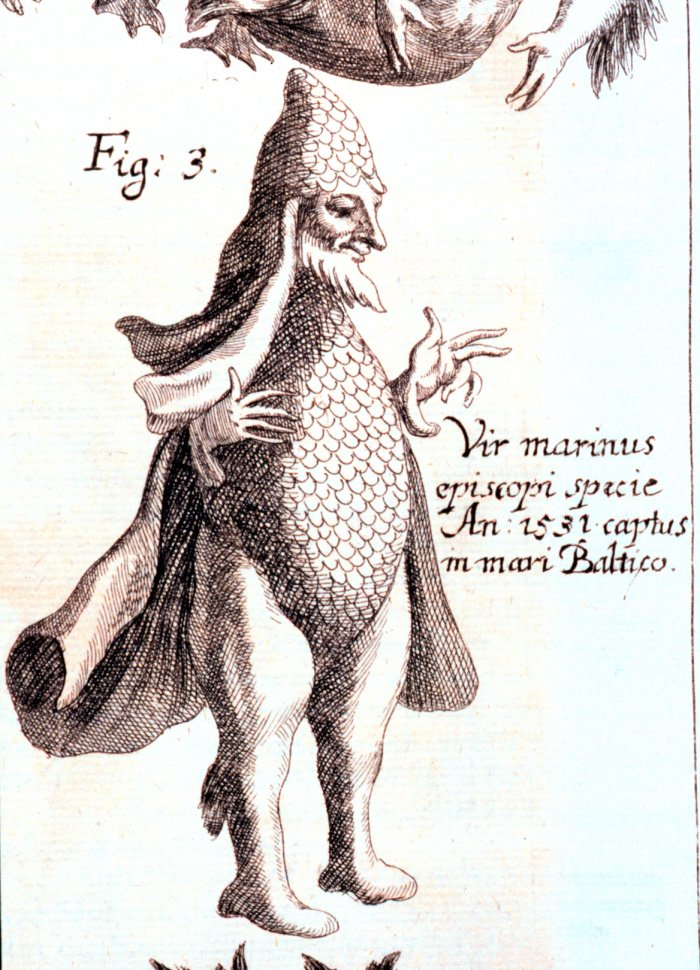
Merman

Ekke Nekkepenn (also Eke Nekepen, besides other various spellings) is a North Frisian legendary figure. In the middle of the 19th century, the local researcher, folklorist, and graphic artist Christian Peter Hansen (1803–1879) portrayed Ekke Nekkepenn as a merman who lives with his wife Rahn at the bottom of the North Sea and plays mischievous tricks on seafarers and residents of the North Frisian Islands. In Theodor Storm’s 1866 published fairy tale "The Rain Maiden", a little man of fire with the name Eckeneckenpen appears and casts evil spells to make the fields wither.

== C. P. Hansen's Meerman Ekke Nekkepenn ==
Today's well-known depiction of Ekke Nekkepenn goes back to Christian Peter Hansen, who retold various legends from the island of Sylt in his 1858 book Frisian Tales And Legends. One of the stories is titled "The Merman Ekkehard Nekkepenn."

The story begins when Ekke Nekkepenn asks the captain, whose England-bound ship runs into a storm, to help with the birth of his child. The beautiful and helpful wife of the captain is led by the merman to his home at the bottom of the North Sea, where his wife Rahn was. After a successful birth, she is returned to the surface of the sea, bringing gold and silver. The captain and his wife continue their journey and later, arrive safe and sound to their home of Rantum on Sylt. Several years later, Ekke Nekkepenn remembered this incident and decides – now that Rahn has become "old and wrinkly" – to take the captain's wife as his own. When he sees the Rantumer Captain's ship one day, he persuades Rahn, who's sitting on the seabed, to grind salt, and the resulting powerful vortex pulls down the Sylt ship along with its crew.

On the way to the captain's wife, Ekke Nekkepenn, who has turned into a handsome sailor, meets their young daughter Inge at Rantum's beach. Against her will, he places a gold ring on each of her fingers, hangs a gold chain around her neck, and declares her his bride. When the girl tearfully asks him to release her, he replies that he could do this only if she could tell him his name the next night. But no one on the island knows the stranger. As Inge walks along the beach in despair the next evening, she hears at the southern time at Hörnum a voice from the mountain, who sings:

Today I want to brew;
Tomorrow I will bake;
The day after tomorrow the wedding I’ll make.
My name’s Ekke Nekkepenn,
My bride is Inge Rantum,
And no one knows when I’m alone.

In Styl Fresian:

Delling skel ik Bruu;
Miaren skel ik baak;
Aurmiaren ik wel Bröllep maak.
Ik jit Ekke Nekkepenn,
Min Brid it Inge fan Raantem,
En di tweet ik nemmen üs aliining.

Then she returns to the arranged meeting place and calls the arriving stranger: "Your name is Ekke Nekkepenn and I remain Inge from Rantum." Because of this, the foolhardy merman cherishes a rage against the residents at Styl and lets loose whenever he feels like it.

== Ekke Nekkepenn and Nordic Mythology ==
C.P. Hansen already dealt in the context of his work on The History of the Friesian Uthlande (1856) with Nordic mythology and reached his own conclusions in Leipzig in 1847 from the published work The Nordic Myth Book After a Series of Lectures from Carsten Hauch (1790–1872).

In his 1850, published "Materials on a Frisian Mythology" Hansen wrote: "The god of the sea was called by the Germans Ögis, by the Danes Eiger, by the Frisians Eie or Eia, also Ekke or Nekke… His wife was the goddess Ran, who blessed the beach, pulled castaways in her nets, and is perhaps where the dun village of Rantum gets its name. ‘Rane’ means incidentally in Nordic as much as ‘to rob.’ According to one Frisian legend Ekke tried to marry a Rantum woman named Inge but got a refusal."

In fact, all of these references produced by Hansen were demonstrated convincingly by Willy Krogmann in his afterword to a Volume of Sylt Legends 1966 to be errors. Neither can the place name Rantum be traced to the Old Norse word Ran, nor is there evidence of an etymological connection between the name of the Norse sea god Ægir and the word "Ekke." Therefore, Krogmann refers to the character Ekke Nekkepenn as Hansen's invention. Among the produced references from Hansen to an old-Nordic goes Ran Krogmann clarified: "Just like the sea god Ekke Nekkepenn, Hansen also invented the sea goddess Raan, or as he writes, Raand."

== Regarding the Genesis Story: Hansen’s Depiction ==
Hansen's "The Meerman Ekke Nekkepenn" is based on two different legends between which there was no original connection. The first part of the story is based on a legend of a water man (Krogmann, Sylt Legends, Nr. 36, p. 17), while the second part is a North Friesian variant on the well-known Rumpelstiltsken fairy tale (Krogmann, Nr. 27, p. 13). The original water man saga resembles in many features Hansen's depiction, but ends with the safe return of the captain's wife on board their ship. Hansen linked the tales together by making the original dwarf the "merman" Ekke Nekkepenn.

Assuming that the name of the character goes back to the same period as the Rumpelstiltskin tale, it may be that the relationship of name component Nekke is connected to the Old High German nihhus, niccus, or nicchessa, old English nicor, and old Nordic nyker. These mean "water spirit" or "water monster" and are also Niss, Neck, or Nöck and are known in their female form as Nixe, who in turn are not related to the Rumpelstiltskin tale. The name would then play on the onomatopoeia of Ekke. Thus it is likely that Hansen was inspired by the harmony in melding the two tales. Eckeneckepenn as Fire Man in Storm's Tale "The Rain Maiden."

Only eight years after the publication of Hansen's legends and stories, Theodor Storm used the substance of the Rumpelstiltskin dwarf in his fairy tale "The Rain Maiden" and depicted him as a malicious goblin. While Hansen's is a merman Storm makes Eckeneckepenn a fire man, who makes fields wither with his magic spells.
