= Pole Poppenspäler (1954 film) =

1954 film

- Directed by: Arthur Pohl
- Release date: 1954
- Country: East Germany
- Language: German

Pole Poppenspäler is an East German film. It was released in 1954. It is based on the 1874 novel Pole Poppenspäler by 19th-century German author Theodor Storm.
