= Mademoiselle Fifi (film) =

1944 film by Robert Wise

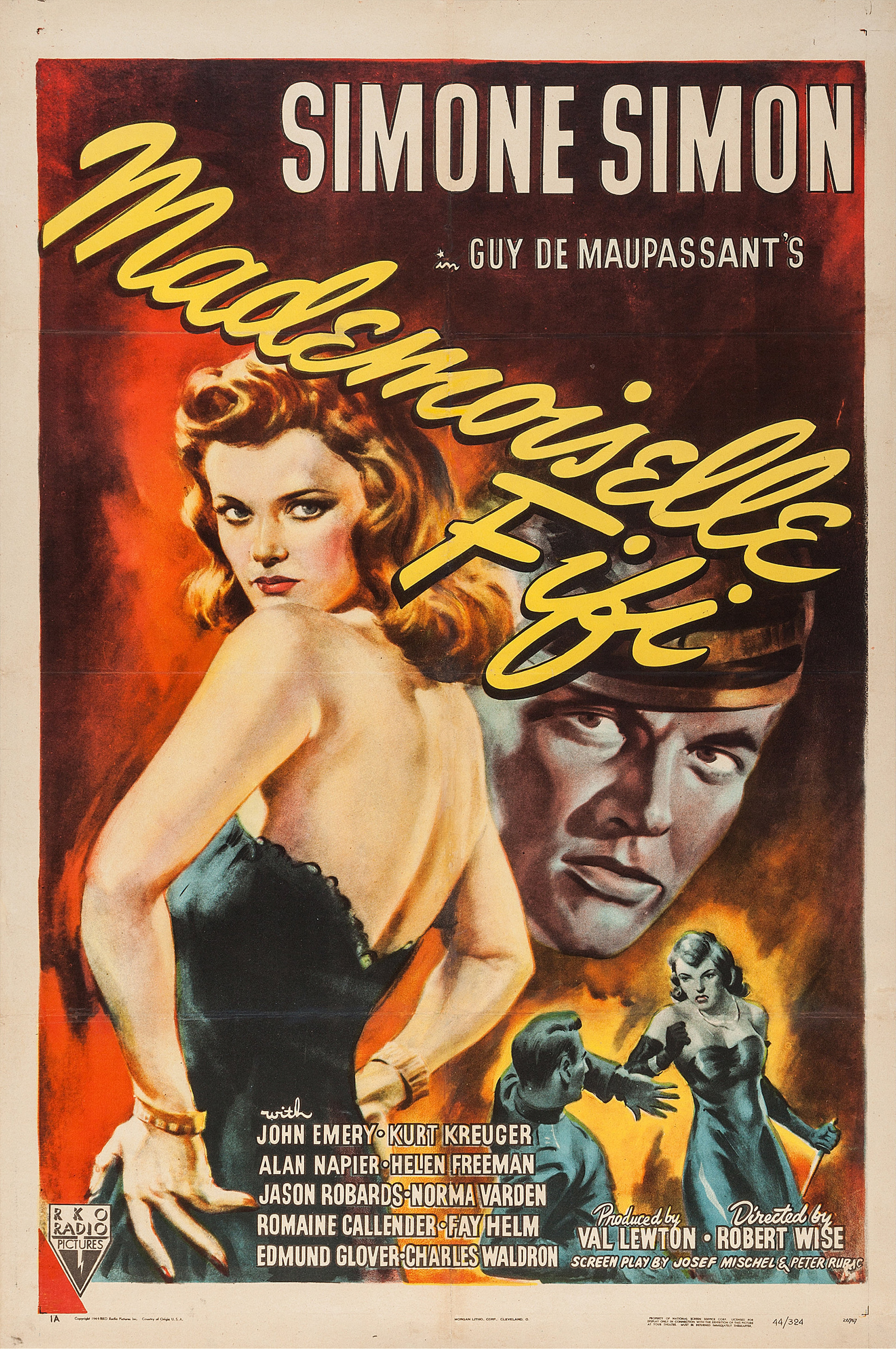
- Theatrical release poster by William Rose
- Directed by: Robert Wise
- Written by: Guy de Maupassant (short stories); Josef Mischel; Peter Ruric
- Produced by: Val Lewton
- Starring: Simone Simon; John Emery; Kurt Kreuger
- Cinematography: Harry J. Wild
- Edited by: J. R. Whittredge
- Music by: Werner R. Heymann
- Distributed by: RKO
- Release date: July 28, 1944 (U.S.)
- Running time: 69 minutes
- Country: United States
- Language: English

Mademoiselle Fifi is a 1944 American period film directed by Robert Wise for RKO, in his solo directorial debut. It was written by Josef Mischel and Peter Ruric based on two short stories by Guy de Maupassant, "Mademoiselle Fifi" and "Boule de Suif". The film features an ensemble cast headed by Simone Simon, John Emery and Kurt Kreuger, and was produced by noted B-film producer Val Lewton. The movie is set during a time when the Prussian Army occupied part of France in 1870. Since it was produced in Hollywood during the Second World War, in the same year Paris was liberated from Nazi rule, it contains elements of wartime propaganda, evoking Jeanne D’Arc among other heroes of French history, and holding up French people in occupied territory who follow orders as objects of pity or outrage, depending on their circumstances.

== Plot ==
In occupied France during the Franco-Prussian War of 1870, a beautiful young laundress, Elizabeth Rousset, shares a stage coach from Rouen with a group of condescending nobles and businessmen and their wives, a political firebrand named Jean Cornudet and a young priest on his way to his new assignment. When they stop for the night at a village controlled by Prussian Lieutenant von Eyrick, known to his fellow officers as "Mademoiselle Fifi", their coach is held up until the laundress agrees to "dine" with the lieutenant. Unlike her social betters, who have all fraternized with the enemy, and had them as guests in their homes, Elizabeth is a simple patriot, and will not eat or consort with the invaders of her country, so the coach cannot go on. The group finally convinces her that it would be best for France for them to get on with their business, and she concedes. While she is closeted with the arrogant Prussian, whose aim is to humiliate and degrade her (essentially he forces her to agree to be raped) the rest of the travellers celebrate their deliverance by getting drunk on champagne, and following the progress of the evening's encounter through the sounds coming from upstairs.

The next morning, when the coach departs – Lt. von Eyrick travelling with them – all the travellers except Cornudet and the priest ostentatiously snub Elizabeth, while chatting and gossiping with the Prussian. At Cleresville, after Elizabeth, the priest and von Eyrick leave the coach, Cornudet is overcome by guilt at his previous actions, tells off the group and leaves to seek out Elizabeth. He apologizes to her, but she rejects him – even so, she has stirred his patriotism again.

The young priest has taken over from the previous curé who defied the Prussians by refusing to ring the church bell, and he has decided to continue that defiance – the bell will remain silent until the first blow is struck for the freedom of France. The Prussian Captain in charge of the village wants the French to submit and ring the bell themselves ("We do not win," explains Lt. von Eyrick, "unless our opponents ring the bell"), but one of his subordinates has vowed that on his next patrol, he will ring the bell himself. Cornudet hears this, and prepares to protect the bell. That night, when the Prussians approach the church to ring the bell, he shoots and kills a lancer charging toward him on horseback.

Meanwhile, the bored Prussian officers have thrown themselves a party, and have rounded up women from the village to attend. Elizabeth feels she must go, as the Prussians threaten to withhold their business from her aunt's laundry unless she does and unless she encourages the other young women to attend. The girls are given beautiful gowns to wear and are promised champagne, but the biggest attraction is the food. Elizabeth is assured that "Mademoiselle Fifi" will not be at the party, but he is. von Eyrick, drunk, demands Elizabeth sit on his lap and forcibly kisses her, biting her lip until it bleeds. When he insults France and the French and slaps her, Elizabeth picks up a knife and stabs him to death. Elizabeth and Cornudet, now fugitives, are hidden by the priest.

When the Prussians make arrangements with the priest for the funeral of Lt. von Eyrick, they ask that the bell be rung, as is customary. The priest agrees, and the Prussians feel that they have won their battle. However, the priest explains later to Elizabeth and Cornudet that the bell can be rung now that the first blow for French freedom has been struck – by a woman.

== Cast ==
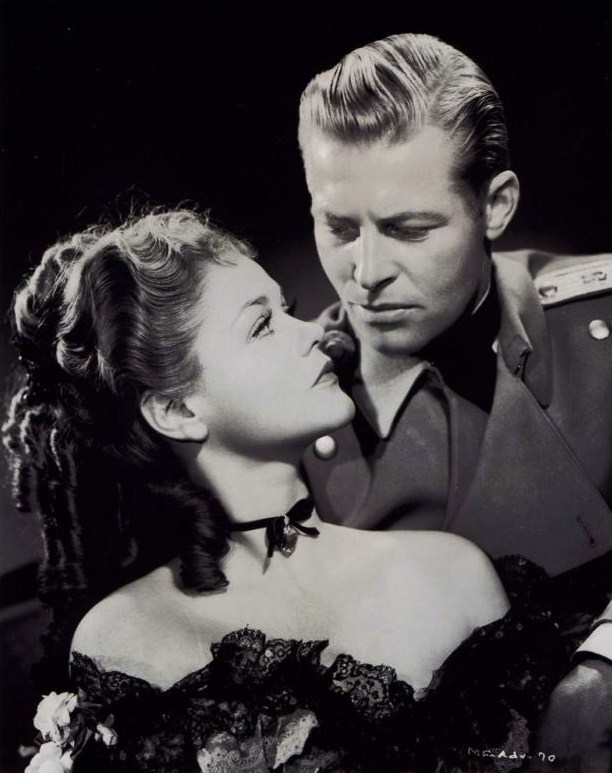
Simone Simon and Kurt Kreuger in Mademoiselle Fifi

- Simone Simon as A Little Laundress (Elizabeth Rousset)
- John Emery as Jean Cornudet
- Kurt Kreuger as Lt. von Eyrick - called "Mademoiselle Fifi"
- Alan Napier as The Count de Breville
- Helen Freeman as The Countess de Breville
- Jason Robards Sr. as A Wholesaler in Wines
- Norma Varden as The Wholesaler's Wife
- Romaine Callender as A Manufacturer
- Fay Helm as The Manufacturer's Wife
- Edmund Glover as A Young Priest
- Charles Waldron as The Curé of Cleresville

== Production ==
Producer Val Lewton wanted to break out of producing horror films, and suggested that RKO make a period film based on the short stories of Guy de Maupassant, with Erich von Stroheim and Simone Simon. George Sanders was approached about playing Lieutenant Fifi.

Prior to directing Mademoiselle Fifi, his first official solo directorial credit, film editor Robert Wise had directed retakes and additional sequences on The Magnificent Ambersons while Orson Welles was in South America, and had replaced director Gunther von Fritsch on Val Lewton's The Curse of the Cat People. His work on the latter convinced Lewton to use him again on Fifi. Wise also directed The Body Snatcher for Lewton in 1945.

Lewton and Wise studied hundreds of period paintings by artists such as Toulouse-Lautrec, Delacroix, Daumier and Detaille, to find the look they wanted. Wise later commented: "Because those were low-budget films, we had to stretch our imagination and get results without too much to work with. How we staged them, how we lit them, how we placed our camera was to get strong, effective results without having the material at hand."

Mademoiselle Fifi was in production from 23 March through late April 1944 with the working title of "The Silent Bell". Shooting took 22 days on a budget of $200,000 – a record low amount for an American costume drama in the sound era. Sets left over from RKO's 1939 film The Hunchback of Notre Dame were utilized, but because of the skimpy budget, cardboard sets were also used at some points. The outdoor snow scenes were shot at Big Bear Lake, California.

To improve her figure when filming, the French actress Simone Simon wore false breasts which she called "my eyes." Before each take, she would call out "Bring me my eyes!"

Although De Maupassant's stories were written in the late 19th century and described a war that had ended 70 years before the film entered production, they reflected France as it was in 1944 with the Prussian occupation as a symbol of the German occupation of France, which was in its fourth year at the time. A review of the history of the Franco-Prussian War reveals grim parallels.

Turner Classic Movies’ Roger Fristoe observes that the film draws strong parallels between that era and the Nazi invasion of the 1940s, admiring the simple people who remained faithful to their country's principles and censuring those who collaborated with the enemy for selfish reasons.

The film was released in the United States in July 1944 (D-Day was June 7) and this was the first film shown in France after the Allied invasion of Normandy. The audience would not have known that Paris would be liberated in August, one month after the release of the film.

== Response ==
Unfortunately for Lewton's hopes for breaking out of the horror genre, Mademoiselle Fifi did not do well at previews, or at the box office once it was released, and was by far the worst grossing of Lewton's films. Some critics, however, thought the film was well worth their while. James Agee wrote in The Nation:

I don't know of any American film which has tried to say as much, as pointedly, about the performance of the middle class in war. There is a gallant, fervent quality about the whole picture, faults and all, which gives it a peculiar kind of life and likeableness, and which signifies that there is one group of men working in Hollywood who have neither lost nor taken care to conceal the purity of their hope and intentions.

== Home media ==
Mademoiselle Fifi has so far only seen a few official releases: a US VHS video Warner Home Video, US LaserDisc (Image Entertainment) and a French region 2 PAL DVD (Editions Montparnasse). It has also been issued on an unauthorised DVD by Manga Films, a Spanish pirate company.
