= Crown Jewels (film) =

1950 film

- Directed by: Franz Cap
- Written by: Franz Cap; Johannes Kai; Kurt Roecken
- Produced by: Heinrich Schier; Wilhelm Sperber
- Starring: Sybille Schmitz; Hans Nielsen; Kurt Kreuger
- Cinematography: Georg Krause
- Edited by: Hilde Spenn
- Music by: Bert Grund
- Production company: Merkur Film
- Distributed by: Bavaria Film
- Release date: 8 December 1950
- Running time: 96 minutes
- Country: West Germany
- Language: German

Crown Jewels (German: Kronjuwelen) is a 1950 West German crime film directed by Franz Cap and starring Sybille Schmitz, Hans Nielsen and Kurt Kreuger.

It was shot at the Bavaria Studios in Munich. The film's sets were designed by the art director Hans Kuhnert.

== Synopsis ==
When a country is invaded, its crown jewels are hidden from the occupiers. Various figures try to get their hands on them.

== Cast ==
- Sybille Schmitz as Eva Skeravenen
- Hans Nielsen as Willroy
- Kurt Kreuger as Paul Regner
- Marina von Ditmar as Helen Fabricius
- Annemarie Holtz as Frau Fabricius
- Rolf von Nauckhoff as Minister
- Herta Worell as Mimi
- Wolfgang Büttnera s Scaliger
- John Pauls-Harding as Charly
- Gerd Brüdern as Benjamin
- Fritz Wagner as Georges
- Hannes Keppler as Kommissar
- Udo Loeptin as Prosecutor
- Karl-Heinz Peters as Lidell
- Herbert Kroll
- Käthe Vanden
- Kurt Stieler
- Ernst Fritz Fürbringer
- Fritz Odemar
- Hildegard Busse
- Ulrich Folkmar as Richter
- Alice Verden

== Bibliography ==
- Parish, James Robert (1977). Film Actors Guide: Western Europe. Scarecrow Press. ISBN 978-0-8108-1044-0.
