= Henrik Gustaf Söderbaum =

Swedish chemist (1862–1933)

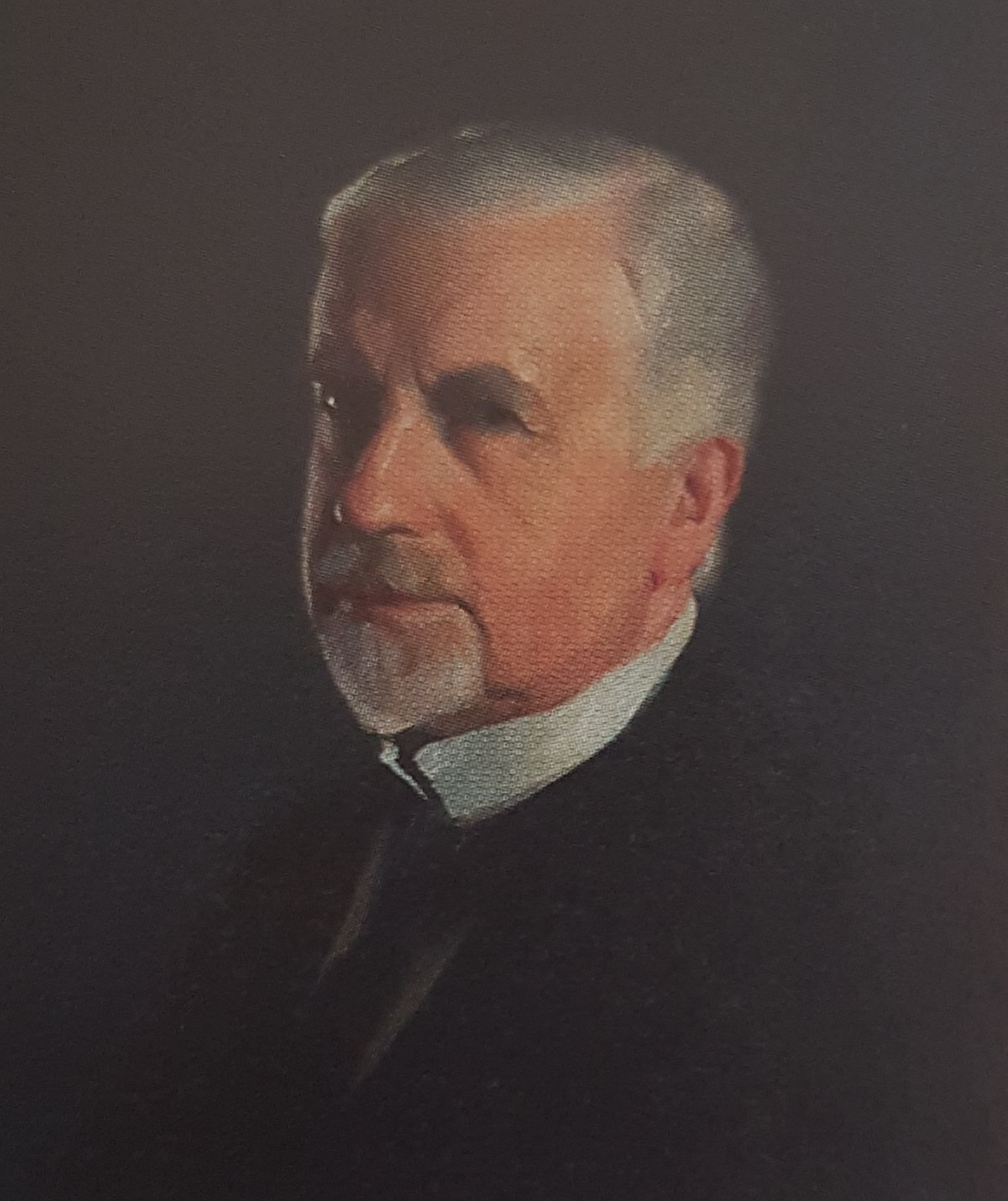
Henrik Gustaf Söderbaum portrayed by Emil Österman

Henrik Gustaf Söderbaum (12 March 1862 in Kalmar – 1933 in Djursholm) was a Swedish chemist and secretary of the Royal Swedish Academy of Sciences from 1923 to 1933.

Söderbaum enrolled at Uppsala University 1879, and was awarded his Ph.D. in 1888 for the thesis Studier öfver platooxalylföreningar ("Studies of platooxalyl compounds"), and was made docent in chemistry the same year. He was made a senior lecturer in chemistry and chemical technology at Chalmers Polytechnic Institute in Gothenburg in 1893. In 1899, he was made professor of agricultural chemistry at Royal Swedish Academy of Agriculture's experimental field in 1899. When the experimental field was reorganised as the Central Establishment for Agricultural Trials in 1907, he was made head of this organisation's chemical department, and remained on this post until 1923.

Söderbaum's scientific activities until 1896 were devoted partially to the studies complex platinum compounds, and partially and primarily to the synthesis and investigation of organic compounds of various classes. Later, he partially devoted himself to the history of chemistry, and especially to the biography of Jöns Jacob Berzelius (from 1901 he edited the Royal Swedish Academy of Sciences' Berzelius publications) and partially to agricultural chemistry, where his investigations into assimilation of phosphorus and the action of various nitrogen fertilizers were seen as important.

His more important works on Berzelius included Berzelius’ werden und wachsen 1779-1821 ("Berzelius' formation and growth 1779-1821", in German) (1899), Jacob Berzelius. Själfbiografiska anteckningar ("Jacob Berzelius. Biographical notes") (1901), Jacob Berzelius. Reseanteckningar ("Jacob Berzelius. Travel notes") (1903) och Jacob Berzelius. Bref ("Jacob Berzelius. Letters") (volumes I-II, 1912, III, 1913, IV, 1915, V, 1918).

Söderbaum was a member of the Royal Swedish Academy of Sciences from 1898, the Academy's president 1912-1913, member of the Nobel Committee for Chemistry from 1900, member of the Royal Society of Sciences and Letters in Gothenburg from 1898, member of the Royal Swedish Academy of Agriculture from 1901, and of the Royal Society of Sciences in Uppsala from 1921. 1918 he was made deputy secretary of the Royal Swedish Academy of Sciences, and was the Academy's secretary from 1923 to his death in 1933. From 1925 he was a member of the board of the Nobel Foundation.

Henrik Gustaf Söderbaum was father to the Swedish-German actress Kristina Söderbaum.
