= Daphne and the Diplomat =

1937 film directed by Robert A. Stemmle

- Directed by: Robert A. Stemmle
- Written by: Fritz von Woedtke (novel); Robert A. Stemmle; Otto Bernhard Wendler
- Produced by: Hans Herbert Ulrich; Robert Wüllner
- Starring: Karin Hardt; Gerda Maurus; Hans Nielsen
- Cinematography: Franz Weihmayr
- Edited by: Herbert B. Fredersdorf
- Music by: Theo Mackeben
- Production company: UFA
- Distributed by: UFA
- Release date: 24 September 1937
- Running time: 95 minutes
- Country: Germany
- Language: German

Daphne and the Diplomat (German: Daphne und der Diplomat) is a 1937 German comedy film directed by Robert A. Stemmle and starring Karin Hardt, Gerda Maurus and Hans Nielsen.

The film's sets were designed by the art director Artur Günther.

== Cast ==
- Karin Hardt as Daphne
- Gerda Maurus as Maria Arni
- Hans Nielsen as Achim Hell
- Karl Schönböck as Bentley
- Elsa Wagner as Frau Wachsmut
- Ingeborg von Kusserow as Matz
- Erich Ziegel as Friedrichsen
- Paul Dahlke as Doctor Kolbe
- Ilse Meudtner as Mercedes
- Hanna Seyferth as Terpsi
- Manon Chafour as Schleifchen
- Ilselore Wöbke as Rolli
- Anny Seitz as Anton
- Ruth Störmer as Feo
- Waltraut von Negelein as Bianca

== Bibliography ==
- Bock, Hans-Michael; Bergfelder, Tim, eds. (2009). The Concise Cinegraph: Encyclopaedia of German Cinema. New York: Berghahn Books. ISBN 978-1-57181-655-9.
