= Hilde Seipp =

German actress

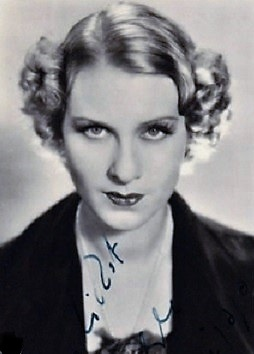
- Born: 28 October 1909; Berlin, German Empire
- Died: 4 November 1999 (aged 90); Berlin, Germany
- Occupation: Actress
- Years active: 1935–1950 (film)

Hilde Seipp (1909–1999) was a German stage and film actress.

== Selected filmography ==
- Togger (1937)
- The Beaver Coat (1937)
- Serenade (1937)
- Johann (1943)

== Bibliography ==
- Giesen, Rolf. Nazi Propaganda Films: A History and Filmography. McFarland & Company, 2003.
