= The Door with Seven Locks (1962 film) =

1962 British film by Alfred Vohrer

- Film poster
- Directed by: Alfred Vohrer
- Written by: Edgar Wallace; Harald G. Petersson; Johannes Kai; Gerhard F. Hummel
- Produced by: Preben Philipsen, Horst Wendlandt, Jacques Letienne
- Starring: Heinz Drache
- Cinematography: Karl Löb
- Edited by: Carl Otto Bartning
- Music by: Peter Thomas
- Production companies: Rialto Film, Les Films Jacques Letienne
- Distributed by: Constantin Film
- Release dates: 2 June 1962 (France); 19 June 1962 (West Germany)
- Running time: 95 minutes
- Countries: West Germany; France
- Language: German

The Door with Seven Locks (German: Die Tür mit den sieben Schlössern) is a 1962 German-language crime film directed by Alfred Vohrer and starring Heinz Drache. It is an adaptation of the 1926 Edgar Wallace novel of the same name.

== Cast ==
- Heinz Drache as Inspector Richard "Dick" Martin
- Sabine Sesselmann as Sybil Lansdown (as Sabina Sesselmann)
- Eddi Arent as Kriminalassistent Holms
- Pinkas Braun as Dr. Antonio Staletti
- Hans Nielsen as Mr. Haveloc
- Gisela Uhlen as Emely Cody, née Cawler
- Werner Peters as Bertram Cody
- Jan Hendriks as Tom Cawler
- Ady Berber as Peter Cawler / Giacco
- Siegfried Schürenberg as Sir John
- Friedrich Joloff as caretaker Burt
- Klaus Kinski as Pheeny
- Eva Ebner as announcer at airport (voice) (uncredited)
- Arthur Schilsky as Peter Livingston (uncredited)
- Alfred Vohrer as announcer at airport / onlooker (uncredited)

== Production ==
It is an adaptation of the Edgar Wallace novel The Door with Seven Locks which had previously been made into a 1940 British film of the same title. Cinematography took place between 26 February and 30 March 1962 at the Ufa-Filmatelier, Berlin and at locations like Tempelhof and Pfaueninsel.

== Release ==
The FSK gave the film a rating of 16 and up and found it not appropriate for screenings on public holidays.

It premiered in France under the title La porte aux sept serrures on 2 June 1962 at the Scarlett/Paris. The German premiere was on 19 June at the Europa-Palast at Frankfurt.
