= Kurt Kreuger =

German actor (1916–2006)

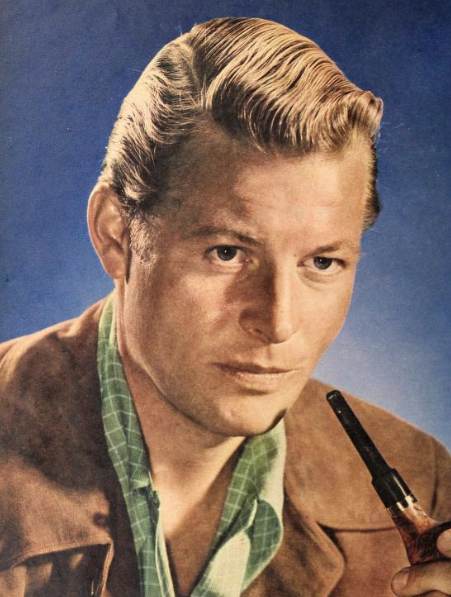
- Kreuger, 1946
- Born: 23 July 1916; Michendorf, Brandenburg, Kingdom of Prussia, German Empire, Present-day Germany
- Died: 12 July 2006 (aged 89); Los Angeles, California, United States
- Education: London School of Economics
- Occupations: actor real estate investor
- Years active: 1940–1978
- Spouse: married in 1951

Kurt Kreuger (July 23, 1916 – July 12, 2006) was a Swiss-reared German actor. Kreuger once was the third-most-requested male actor at 20th Century Fox. He starred with, among others, Ingrid Bergman and Humphrey Bogart.

== Life and career ==
Kreuger was born in Michendorf near Potsdam, but he grew up in Switzerland (in St. Moritz). He attended the London School of Economics and enrolled in Columbia University (New York City) to study medicine, but he soon dropped out to pursue a career in acting. His father, a businessman, cut off his allowance after he embarked seriously on an acting career.

In 1943, during the filming of Sahara, Kreuger was almost killed in a dramatic scene because the director almost forgot to say "cut". He was quoted by the San Francisco Chronicle:

I was running across the dunes when Tambul jumped on top of me and pressed my head into the sand to suffocate me. Only Zoltán forgot to yell cut, and Ingram was so emotionally caught up in the scene that he kept pressing my face harder and harder. Finally, I went unconscious. Nobody knew this. Even the crew was transfixed, watching this dramatic "killing." If Zoltán hadn't finally said cut, as an afterthought, it would have been all over for me.

Kurt Kreuger circa 1945, autographed cinema photo for Henning von Berg, 18 April 2006

Kreuger's first major film credit was in Mademoiselle Fifi, a 1944 release that is set in the Franco-Prussian War.

Kreuger was primarily offered roles in World War II films as a German officer, prompting him to complain about being typecast as a Nazi. One of Kreuger's few opportunities to play a non-Nazi role was in 1948's Unfaithfully Yours, in which he played Rex Harrison's personal assistant. When Kreuger asked Darryl F. Zanuck for better roles, Zanuck reportedly replied: "What's your hurry? With your looks, you'll be good at 50."

Kreuger was once the third most-requested male pinup at 20th Century Fox, after Tyrone Power and John Payne. He briefly returned to Europe and starred in several German films. He returned to the United States in 1955 after being injured in a car accident in Paris, France. His last film was The St. Valentine's Day Massacre in 1967. He also had a number of roles in television in the 1950s and 1960s, including two guest appearances on Perry Mason and five on 77 Sunset Strip.

Ingrid Bergman and Kurt Kreuger in the film Fear, 1954

== Personal life ==
Kreuger was a successful real estate investor, primarily in properties in Beverly Hills, California. He lived in Beverly Hills and had a second home in Aspen, Colorado. He enjoyed skiing and participated in that sport until he was 87.

Kreuger was married in 1951, in what he subsequently described as "three years of bliss, three years of hell." He had a son prior to an acrimonious divorce.

He died on 12 July 2006, eleven days before his 90th birthday, at Cedars-Sinai Medical Center in Los Angeles following a stroke.

== Partial filmography ==
- Mystery Sea Raider (1940) – Franz, German Seaman
- Arise, My Love (1940) – German Sentry (uncredited)
- Man Hunt (1941) – German Attaché (uncredited)
- The Deadly Game (1941) – Lieutenant
- International Squadron (1941) – Flyer (uncredited)
- A Yank in the R.A.F. (1941) – German Pilot (uncredited)
- The Purple V (1943) – Walter Heyse
- The Moon Is Down (1943) – Orderly (uncredited)
- Hangmen Also Die! (1943) – Gestapo Officer (uncredited)
- Tonight We Raid Calais (1943) – German Soldier (uncredited)
- Edge of Darkness (1943) – German Co-Pilot (uncredited)
- Action in the North Atlantic (1943) – German U-Boat Sailor on Microphone (uncredited)
- Background to Danger (1943) – Chauffeur (uncredited)
- Secret Service in Darkest Africa (1943) – Ernst Muller
- Sahara (1943) – Capt. von Schletow
- The Strange Death of Adolf Hitler (1943) – Nazi Youth leader
- None Shall Escape (1944) – Lt. Gersdorf
- The Hitler Gang (1944) – Young SS Officer (uncredited)
- Mademoiselle Fifi (1944) – Lt. von Eyrick – Called 'Fifi'
- Hotel Berlin (1945) – Major Otto Kauders
- Escape in the Desert (1945) – Lt. Von Kleist
- Paris Underground (1945) – Capt. Kurt von Weber
- The Spider (1945) – Ernest, alias The Great Garonne
- The Dark Corner (1946) – Anthony Jardine
- Sentimental Journey (1946) – Walt Wilson
- Unfaithfully Yours (1948) – Tony Windborn
- Spy Hunt (1950) – Captain Heimer
- Crown Jewels (1950) – Paul Regner
- Herzen im Sturm (1951) – Jens Wulf
- The Blue Hour (1953) – Dulong
- La Paura (1954) – Erich Baumann
- The Missing Scientists (1955) – Max Anders
- The Enemy Below (1957) – Von Holem
- Legion of the Doomed (1958) – Capt. Marcheck
- The St. Valentine's Day Massacre (1967) – James Clark

== Television ==
- 77 Sunset Strip (1958–1963, multiple episodes) – Paul Van Dehn / Rafael Galindos / Kurt Weibel / Kurt Heller / John Luder
- Perry Mason (1959–1964, multiple episodes) – Hans Breel / Karl Kadar
- Route 66 (1961) – Otto Weller
- GE True (1963) – episode "Heydrich" (two parts) as Reinhard Heydrich
- Combat! (1963–1965) – two episodes, "Glow Against The Sky" as Captain Neubauer & "Finest Hour" as Major Werner
- The Man from U.N.C.L.E. (1964) – Stefan Valder
- Mission: Impossible (1967) – Polya
- Wonder Woman (1976–1977) – two episodes, "The Feminum Mystique: Part 1" as Major Hemmschler & "Anschluss '77" as Koenig
