= Two Hearts in May =

1958 film directed by Géza von Bolváry

- Directed by: Géza von Bolváry
- Written by: Hans Fritz Köllner (novel); Janne Furch
- Produced by: Karl Mitschke; Kurt Ulrich; Heinz Willeg
- Starring: Dieter Borsche; Kristina Söderbaum; Walter Giller
- Cinematography: Georg Bruckbauer; Willi Sohm
- Edited by: Liselotte Schumacher; Wolfgang Wehrum
- Music by: Michael Jary
- Production company: Kurt Ulrich Film
- Distributed by: UFA
- Release date: 9 January 1958
- Running time: 90 minutes
- Country: West Germany
- Language: German

Two Hearts in May (German: Zwei Herzen im Mai) is a 1958 West German musical comedy film directed by Géza von Bolváry and starring Dieter Borsche, Kristina Söderbaum, and Walter Giller.

The film's sets were designed by the art directors Hans Kuhnert and Wilhelm Vorwerg. It was shot at the Tempelhof Studios in Berlin.

== Cast ==
- Dieter Borsche as Peter Paul Müller
- Kristina Söderbaum as Annemie Müller
- Walter Giller as Ralf Siedler
- Carla Hagen as Erna Bölke
- Willy Fritsch as Gesenius
- Walter Gross as Julius Krüger
- Vera Molnar as Marion Dehl
- Hans Nielsen as Direktor Leisemann
- Eckart Dux as Friedrich Müller
- Ingrid Stenn as Karin Leisemann
- Willy Millowitsch as August Bölke
- Eve Dietrich as Monika Müller
- Willi Rose as Engelmann
- Ralph Lothar as Fechner
- Joe Furtner
- Erna Haffner
- Hans Stiebner
- Werner Kroll
- Waltraut Runze
- Klaus-Dieter Königsdörfer
- Klaus-Ulrich Krause as Friedrich als Kind
- Margitta Sonke as Monika als Kind
- Fredy Rolf

== Bibliography ==
- Bock, Hans-Michael; Bergfelder, Tim, eds. (2009). The Concise Cinegraph: Encyclopaedia of German Cinema. New York: Berghahn Books. ISBN 978-1-57181-655-9.
