= Immortal Beloved (1951 film) =

1951 film

- Directed by: Veit Harlan
- Written by: Veit Harlan; Theodor Storm (novella Aquis Submersus)
- Produced by: Hans Domnick
- Starring: Kristina Söderbaum; Hans Holt; Hermann Schomberg
- Cinematography: Werner Krien
- Edited by: Margarete Steinborn
- Music by: Wolfgang Zeller
- Production company: Hans Domnick Filmproduktion
- Distributed by: Herzog Filmverleih
- Release date: 1 February 1951
- Running time: 105 minutes
- Country: West Germany
- Language: German

Immortal Beloved (German: Unsterbliche Geliebte) is a 1951 West German drama film directed by Veit Harlan and starring Kristina Söderbaum, Hans Holt and Hermann Schomberg and based on Theodor Storm's novella Beneath the Flood. It was shot at the Göttingen Studios with location shooting in Schleswig-Holstein. The film's sets were designed by the art director Walter Haag.

== Cast ==
- Kristina Söderbaum as Katharina von Hollstein
- Hans Holt as Johannes S.
- Hermann Schomberg as Pfarrer Georg Bonnix
- Alexander Golling as Wulf von Hollstein
- Franz Schafheitlin as Talma
- Otto Gebühr as Dietrich
- Hedwig Wangel as Bas' Ursel
- Jakob Tiedtke as Wirt
- Erna Morena as Äbtissin
- Eduard Marks as Erzähler
- Tilo von Berlepsch as Kurt von der Risch
- Else Ehser as Trienke
- Robert Taube
- Eugen Dumont as Bauer Mahnke
- Günter Kind as Bruder des Johannes
- Wilhelm Meyer-Ottens as Bauer in der Waldschänke
- Peter Thomas
- Paul Weber

== Bibliography ==
- Bangert, Axel. The Nazi Past in Contemporary German Film: Viewing Experiences of Intimacy and Immersion. Boydell & Brewer, 2014.
