= Aquis Submersus (novella) =

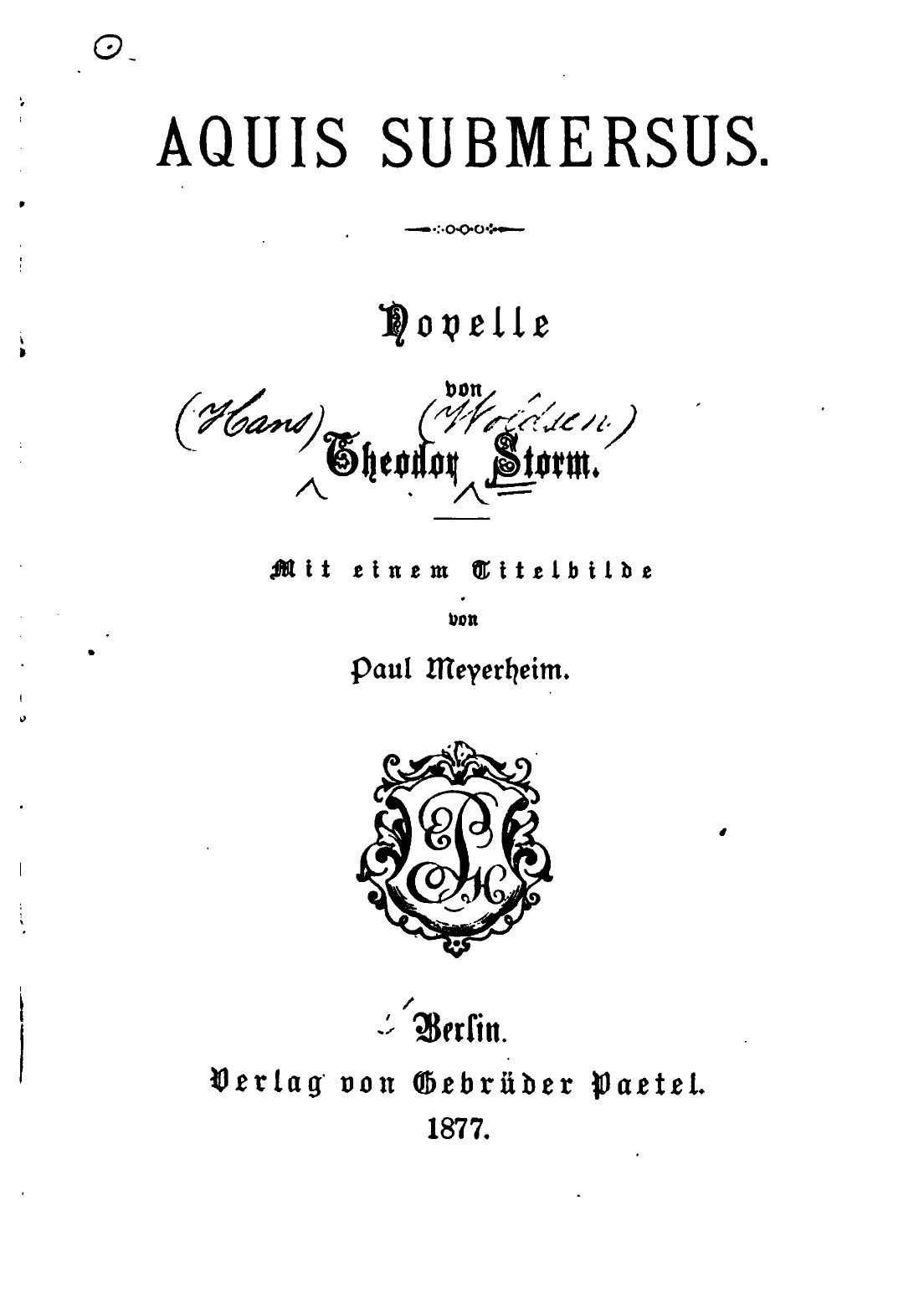
Title page of the first edition

Aquis Submersus is an 1877 novella by the German writer Theodor Storm. It has also been published as Beneath the Flood. It is set in Northern Germany right after the Thirty Years' War and tells a tragic love story.

== Publication ==
An English translation by Geoffrey Skelton was published in 1962 as Beneath the Flood. New translations under the original title have been published in 1974 and 2015.

== Adaptations ==
The novella was the basis for the 1951 film Immortal Beloved, directed by Veit Harlan. It was also the basis for Wolfgang Schleif's 1979 television drama Wie Rauch und Staub.
