= Legion of the Doomed (film) =

- Theatrical release poster
- Directed by: Thor L. Brooks
- Written by: Tom Hubbard; Fred Eggers
- Produced by: William F. Broidy
- Starring: Bill Williams; Dawn Richard; Anthony Caruso; Kurt Kreuger; Tom Hubbard; Hal Gerard
- Cinematography: John J. Martin
- Edited by: Herbert R. Hoffman
- Production company: William F. Broidy Productions
- Distributed by: Allied Artists Pictures
- Release date: September 21, 1958
- Running time: 76 minutes
- Country: United States
- Language: English

Legion of the Doomed is a 1958 American adventure film directed by Thor L. Brooks and written by Tom Hubbard and Fred Eggers. The film stars Bill Williams, Dawn Richard, Anthony Caruso, Kurt Kreuger, Tom Hubbard and Hal Gerard. The film was released on September 21, 1958, by Allied Artists Pictures.

== Cast ==
- Bill Williams as Lt. Smith
- Dawn Richard as Dalbert Marcheck
- Anthony Caruso as Sgt. Calvelli
- Kurt Kreuger as Capt. Marcheck
- Tom Hubbard as Tom Brodie
- Hal Gerard as Garabi
- John Damler as Darjon
- Rush Williams as Canuck
- George Baxter as Col. Lesperance
- Saul Gorss as Sgt. Tordeau
- Joe Abdullah as Karaba
