= Paul the Puppeteer =

Novella by German writer Theodor Storm

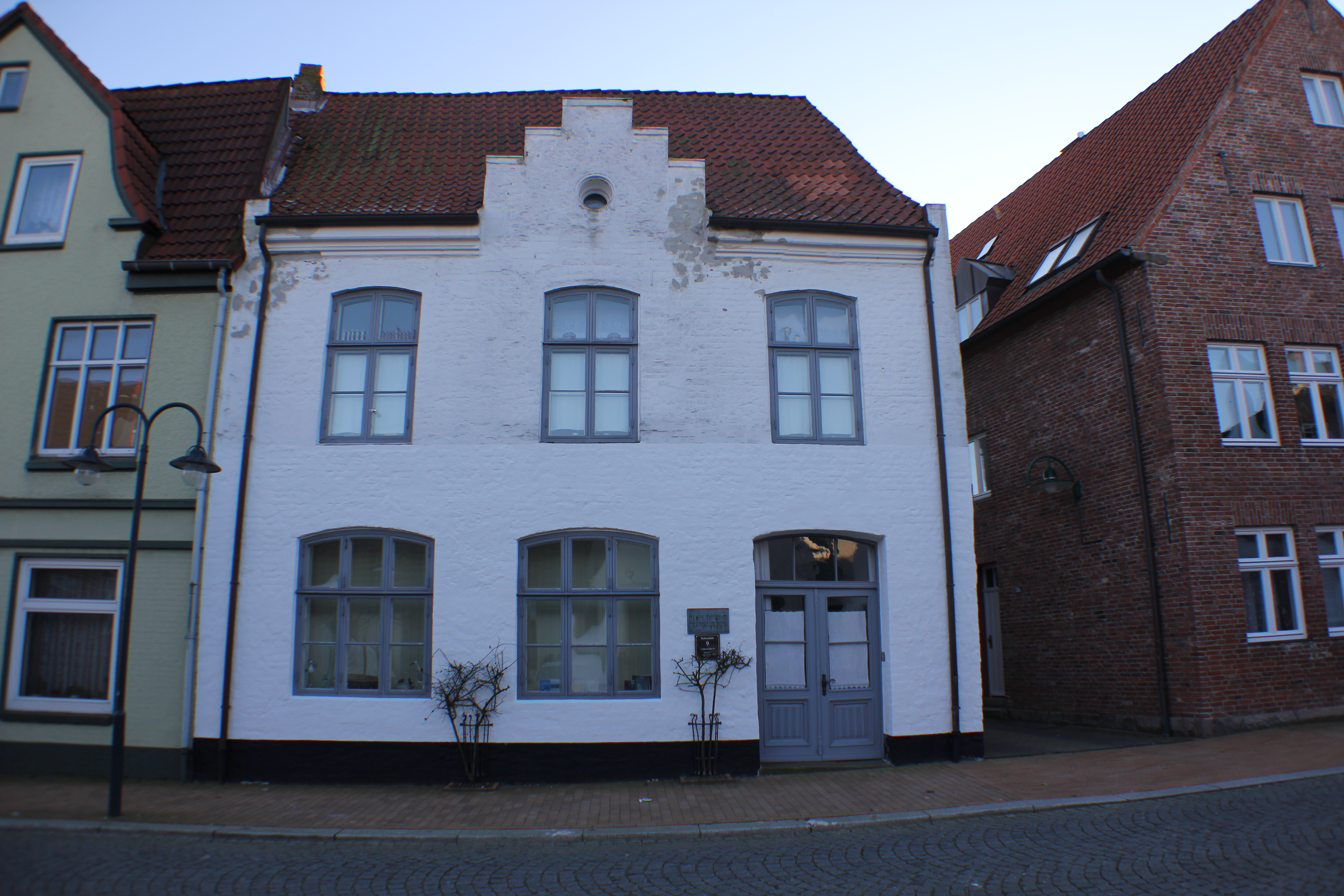
The story is set at Der Alte Schützenhof in Husum

Paul the Puppeteer (German: Pole Poppenspäler) is an 1874 novella by the German writer Theodor Storm. It is about a Frisian woodturner who tells the story of how he got his nickname.

An English translation by Denis Jackson was published in 2004. The story has been adapted for film multiple times.

== Film adaptations ==
- 1935 – Pole Poppenspäler, directed by Curt Oertel
- 1944/1945 – Der Puppenspieler, directed by Alfred Braun, left unfinished
- 1954 – Pole Poppenspäler, directed by Arthur Pohl
- 1968 – Pole Poppenspäler, directed by Günther Anders
- 1988 – Pole Poppenspäler, directed by Guy Kubli
