= Kristina Söderbaum =

Swedish-German actress (1912–2001)

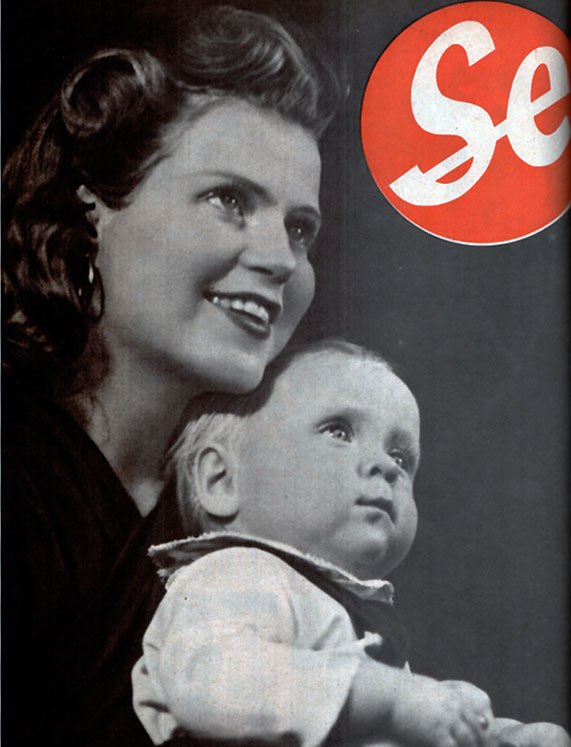
- Söderbaum in 1941
- Born: Beata Margareta Kristina Söderbaum; 5 September 1912; Stockholm, Sweden
- Died: 12 February 2001 (aged 88); Hitzacker, Lower Saxony, Germany
- Occupation: Actress
- Spouse: Veit Harlan (m. 1939; died 1964)
- Children: 2
- Father: Henrik Gustaf Söderbaum

Beata Margareta Kristina Söderbaum (5 September 1912 – 12 February 2001) was a Swedish-German film actress, film producer, and photographer. She performed in Nazi-era films made by a German state-controlled production company, several of them directed by her husband Veit Harlan.

== Early life ==
Söderbaum was born in Stockholm, Sweden; her father, Professor Henrik Gustaf Söderbaum (1862–1933), was the permanent secretary of the Royal Swedish Academy of Sciences.

Söderbaum spent her school and boarding school years in Stockholm, Paris, and Switzerland. After both her parents died shortly after one another, Söderbaum moved to Berlin and enrolled in a theatre school.

== Career ==
=== Nazi era ===
Beginning in 1935, Söderbaum starred in a number of films with director Veit Harlan, whom she married in 1939. Harlan and Söderbaum made ten films together for the then state-controlled film production company UFA until 1945.

According to film historian Antje Ascheid, Söderbaum is frequently identified as "most singularly representative of the Nazi ideal, as the quintessential Nazi star". As a beautiful Swedish blonde, Söderbaum had the baby-doll looks that epitomized the model Aryan woman. In fact, she had already played the role of the innocent Aryan in a number of feature films and was well known to German audiences. Her youth and beauty made her a symbol of health and purity and thus an exemplary specimen of the Nazi ideal of womanhood.

In a number of her films, she had been imperiled by the threat of rassenschande ("racial pollution"). Two such roles were Dorothea Sturm, the doomed heroine of the antisemitic historical melodrama Jud Süß, who commits suicide by drowning after being raped by the villain, and Anna in Die goldene Stadt, a Sudeten German whose desire for the city (in defiance of blood and soil) and whose seduction by a Czech result in her drowning suicide. As a result of her watery fate in these two films, as well as a similar end in her debut in Harlan's 1938 film Jugend, she was given the mock honorary title Reichswasserleiche ("Drowned Corpse of the Reich").

Other roles included Elske in The Journey to Tilsit, the wholesome German wife whose husband betrays her with a Polish woman, but finally returns, repentant; Elisabeth in Immensee, who marries a rich landowner to forget her unrequited love, and in the end decides to remain faithful even after she is widowed and her lover returns; Aels in Opfergang, a woman who dies after her love affair; Luise Treskow in The Great King, a miller's daughter who encourages Frederick the Great; and Maria in Kolberg, a peasant girl who loyally supports the resistance to Napoleon and is the only survivor of her family.

=== Postwar ===
In the first few years after the war, Söderbaum was often heckled off the stage and even had rotten vegetables thrown at her. In subsequent years, she frequently expressed regret for her roles in anti-Semitic films.

After her husband was again permitted to direct films, Söderbaum played leading roles in a number of his films. These included Blue Hour (1952), The Prisoner of the Maharaja (1953), Betrayal of Germany (1954), and I Will Carry You on My Hands (1958). Their last joint project was a 1963 theater production of August Strindberg's A Dream Play in Aachen.

After Harlan's death in 1964, Söderbaum became a noted fashion photographer. In 1974, she took a role in Hans-Jürgen Syberberg's film Karl May. In 1983, she published her memoirs under the title Nichts bleibt immer so ("Nothing Stays That Way Forever"). In her later years, Söderbaum faded into obscurity but still took roles in three movies and the television series The Bergdoktor. Her last film was with Hugh Grant in the thriller Night Train to Venice in 1994. She died in 2001 in a nursing home in Hitzacker, Lower Saxony, Germany.

== Filmography ==
=== Film ===
Year	Title	Role	Notes	Ref.
1933	How do you treat a dog?		Short film	
1934	The Song to Her	Guest at Rondo admiring the dancer		
1936	Uncle Bräsig	Minning		
1938	Youth	Ännchen		
1938	Covered Tracks	Séraphine Lawrence		
1939	The Immortal Heart	Ev Henlein		
1939	The Journey to Tilsit	Elske Settegast		
1940	Jud Süß	Tochter Dorothea Sturm		
1942	The Great King	Luise Treskow		
1942	The Golden City	Anna "Anuschka" Jobst		
1943	Immensee	Elisabeth Uhl		
1944	Opfergang	Aels Flodéen		
1945	Kolberg	Maria Werner		
1951	Immortal Beloved	Katharina von Hollstein		
1951	Hanna Amon	Hanna Amon		
1953	The Blue Hour	Angelika		
1953	Stars Over Colombo	Yrida		
1954	The Prisoner of the Maharaja	Yrida		
1955	Verrat an Deutschland	Katharina von Weber		
1958	Two Hearts in May	Annemie Müller		
1958	I'll Carry You in My Arms	Ines Thormälen		
1962	The Maharaja's blonde wife	Yrida	A single-cut of The Prisoner of the Maharaja and the Stars Over Colombo	
1966	Playgirl	Visitor at the Six Days of Berlin	Scenes deleted	
1974	Karl May	Emma May		
1988	Let's Go Crazy	Comtessa		
1991	75 Jahre UFA: Eine Deutsche Filmgeschichte	Self		
1992	Das bleibt, das kommt nie wieder	Self		
1993	The Trip back to Sweden - Kristina Söderbaum	Self		
1993	Night Train to Venice	Euphemia	Final film role	
2009	Harlan – In the Shadow of Jew Süss	Self (archival footage)		

=== Television ===
Year	Title	Role	Notes	Ref.
1973	Die große Rolle	Self	Jud Suess - the Nightmare Role	
1992	We Have Ways of Making You Think	Self	Goebbels Master of Propaganda	
1993	Der Bergdoktor	Frau Landmann		

== Awards ==
Award	Year	Category	Nominated work	Result	Ref(s)
Venice Film Festival	1942	Volpi Cup for Best Actress	The Golden City	Won	
