= Opfergang =

1944 film

Opfergang (The Great Sacrifice or Rite of Sacrifice) is a 1944 German film directed by Veit Harlan. It is based on Rudolf G. Binding's work of the same title, with alterations for propaganda purposes. Unlike other Harlan films of the era, Opfergang does not include explicit Nazi messages, but instead features more subtle Nazi motifs and themes. The film was dubbed a "masterpiece" by Slovenian philosopher Slavoj Žižek in 2012.

== Synopsis ==
Albrecht Froben, though married to Octavia, falls in love with his neighbor, Äls Flodéen. She, however, is slowly dying from a debilitating disease. During an epidemic, Albrecht goes to bring her daughter to safety but he catches typhoid and is quarantined in hospital. Octavia, realising the love match, and hearing that Äls is now bedridden and dying, dresses up as him and rides by her gates every day to keep her spirits up—her bed is next to the window. Albrecht returns. Äls has a dream in which she talks to her projection of Albrecht and concludes that she does not wish to take part in this union and accepts death. Albrecht is reconciled with his wife.

== Cast ==
- Kristina Söderbaum as Äls Flodéen
- Irene von Meyendorff as Octavia Froben
- Carl Raddatz as Albrecht Froben
- Franz Schafheitlin as Mathias
- Ernst Stahl-Nachbaur as Sanitätsrat Dr. Terboven
- Otto Treßler as Senator Froben, Octavia's father
- Annemarie Steinsieck as Frau Froben, Octavia's mother
- Frida Richard as Frau Steinkamp, who cares for Äls's child
- Ludwig Schmitz as carnival speaker
- Edgar Pauly as the servant of the Frobens
- Charlotte Schultz as Äls's nurse
- Paul Bildt as the notary for testament

== Motifs ==
Nazism makes no overt appearance in the film which appears as a work of entertainment, but it includes themes frequently found in Nazi propaganda. Sacrifice and death are constant motifs in the movie — Äls even recounts how she had to put down her ill dog — and Albrecht's return to his wife is a reflection of a realization of the tragic side of life.

Although Äls is a danger to the marriage, she is not presented as wholly negative, owing to her love of nature. She dies in a reversal of the source material, where the husband dies. This reflected a need to avoid temptation to adultery, when many families were separated, and Joseph Goebbels himself insisted that it must be the woman rather than the man who paid. Nevertheless, her death is surrounded by a heavenly chorus and transcendence.

== Distribution ==
Owing to the shortage of raw film, and its full color nature, it received only very limited release.

== Reception ==
The Slovenian philosopher Slavoj Žižek, interested in ideologies in cinema, voted for Opfergang in the 2012 Sight & Sound poll of the best films of all time. He called the film "the masterpiece" of Harlan and wrote: "The ultimate lesson of this intricate staging is that the bitter truth (marriage will survive, Äls has to accept her death) can only be formulated in the guise of a hallucination within a hallucination. And, perhaps, here enters the fact that Veit Harlan was the Nazi director, author of the two key propaganda classics, The Jew Suess and Kolberg: does the same formal feature not hold also for the Nazi ideology? In it, the truth can appear only as the hallucination within the hallucination, as the way the Nazi subject hallucinates the Jews hallucinating their anti-German plot."

Director Dominik Graf said he loved Opfergang and called it "a post-fascist film to a certain extent." Brad Stevens, writing for BFI, said the film was aesthetically subversive within the context of Nazism, as the relationship between Octavia and Äls at the film's center has a lesbian nature to it.

== Analysis ==
In the opening scene of Opfergang, the city skyline of Hamburg is shown including the Bismarck memorial. Though the film is not overtly Nazi propaganda, this opening sequence alludes to the German imperial past, glorifying imperialism and harkening back to another era of German expansion. Albrecht is paraded in front of a prestigious society of Hamburg and shows various artifacts collected from a long voyage at sea. He is congratulated for his work and his exotic artifacts are marveled at by members of the society. This interaction highlights how Nazi Germany wished to reclaim the former colonial glory that was taken from them following the First World War.

Throughout the film, the melodramatic feeling of ‘too late’ is a common motif. This feeling is pervasive in the film, from small things mentioned in passing, such as Ails mentioning that she preferred to put the dog down herself, to the central focus of the film, her love for Albrecht. She comes to realize that the love will never work out, as Albrecht must stay committed to his marriage and uphold his commitment to Octavia and society. ‘Too late’ is a theme that is central to Linda William’s, concept of Body Genres for melodrama, or that certain types of film are designed more for emotional connection and relation rather than as a purely artistic endeavor. This need for emotional connection is also used to more effectively communicate Nazi ideology to the viewer by breaking emotional walls that may have initially inhibited some understanding. The sense of loss also echoes the loss and necessity to go without certain luxuries that many people must have been feeling in Germany at the time, as its filming and 1944 release would have coincided with intense fighting on both fronts.

Der Tagesspiegel noted that Ält requesting euthanasia from her doctor constituted direct promotion of Nazi euthanasia programs.

== Legacy ==
Brad Stevens suggested that a scene in the 1999 film Eyes Wide Shut may have been inspired by a similar scene in Opfergang.
