= Immensee (novella) =

Novella by German realist Theodor Storm

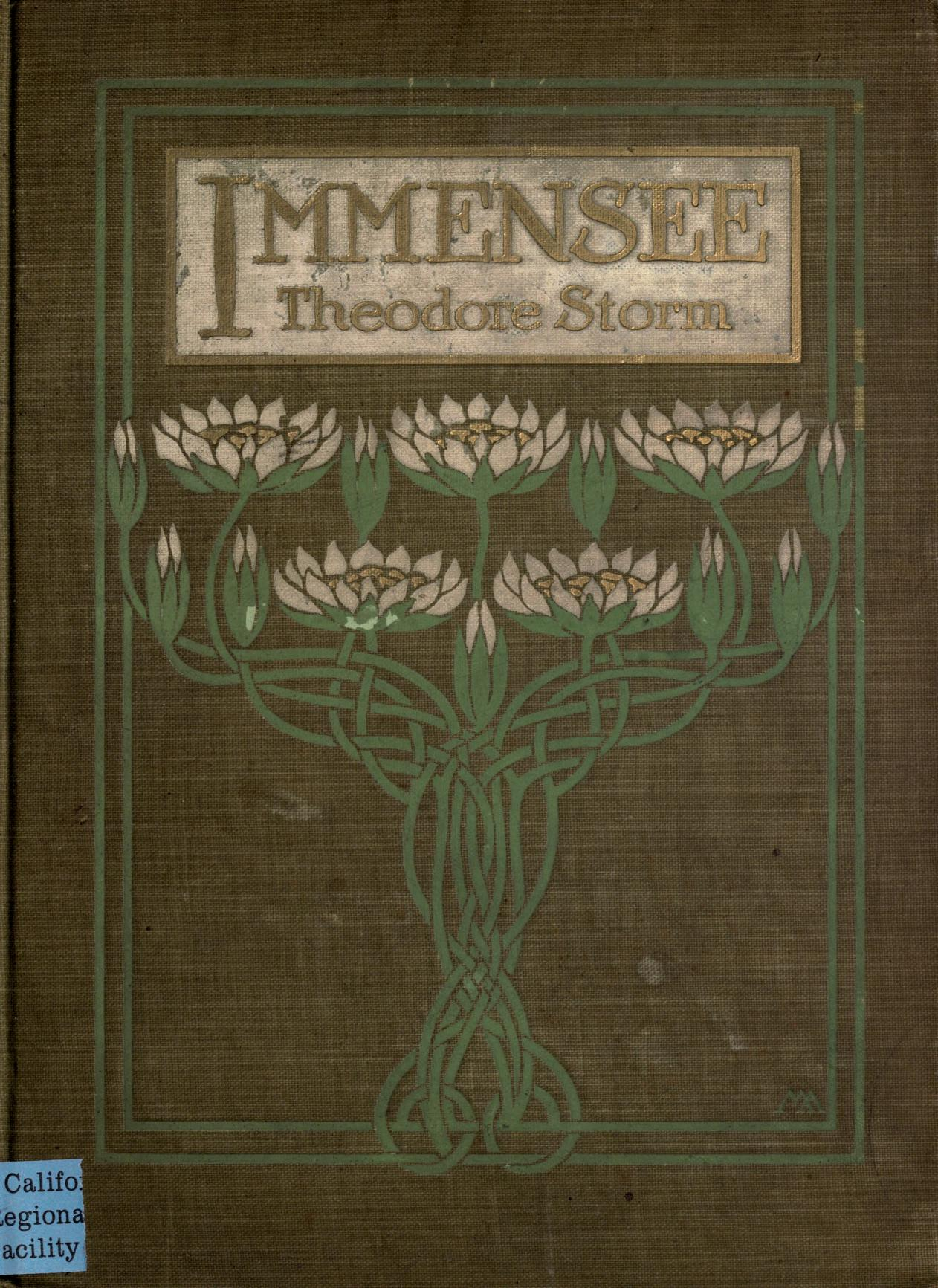

Immensee (1849 and 1851) is a novella by German author Theodor Storm. It was the work that made him famous and remains to this day one of his most widely read.

== History ==
Immensee was first published in Biernatzki’s Volksbuch in December 1849 when the author was well known regionally, but with the revised edition (1851), he became famous all over Germany and then the world. By the time of his death in 1888, it saw 33 editions in 17 languages. Storm revised it using some comments from his friend Tycho Mommsen and republished it in 1851 in Sommergeschichten und Lieder (Summer Stories and Songs) and finally as a single work edition in 1852. The first English translation appeared in 1858 in Henry Colburn’s New Monthly Magazine and Literary Journal with a second version first appearing in the USA in 1863. It was Storm's best selling work and remains to this day one of his most widely read, along with The Rider on the White Horse and Pole Poppenspäler.

On the surface it is a simple love story divided into ten scenes as framed by the remembrances of Reinhardt as an old man thinking back to his youth, his childhood love for Elisabeth, and his friend Erich who ends up marrying her. The story thus takes place over the course of an entire life. It is autobiographical to some degree with echoes of Storm's own life. The novel is richly symbolic. Wiebke Strehl said that "Growing interest on the part of twentieth-century literary scholars indicate that there is much more to this story than meets the eye." Other critics have countered that it is crudely symbolic and overly sentimental.

== Plot ==
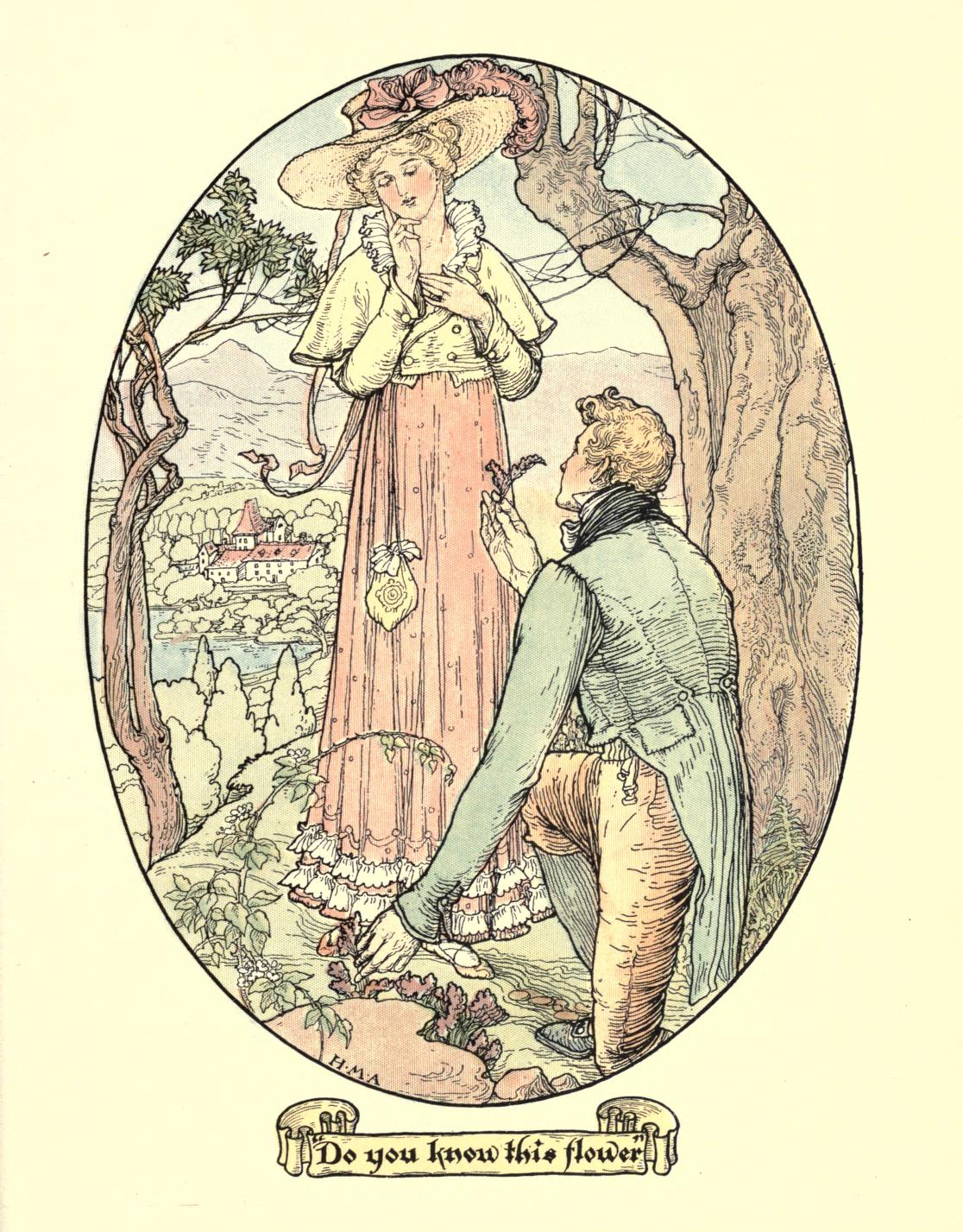

From their early childhood on, the protagonists Reinhard Werner and Elisabeth (no last name mentioned) have been close friends. Reinhard, who is five years older than Elisabeth, impresses her by writing fairy tales on slips of paper for her. Without Elisabeth knowing, Reinhard additionally keeps a vellum-bound book in which he composes poems about his life experiences.

Despite his young age, Reinhard is sure that he wants to spend his whole life with Elisabeth. Neither a new school, nor his new male friends can change this. He reveals his childhood dream of a life together in India to Elisabeth. After a moment of hesitation, 5-year old Elisabeth agrees to his plans.

At the age of seventeen, the moment of separation from Elisabeth comes inescapably closer. Although he will pursue his education in town, Reinhard promises to continue writing fairy tales for her and send them by letter to his mother. She is delighted about this idea for she cannot imagine a life without Reinhard.

Soon enough Christmas Eve comes along. Reinhard spends his time with his fellow students in the Ratskeller, where he shows interest to a girl playing the zither accompanied by a fiddler. After acting coy, she eventually sings for Reinhard. However, he offends her by heading home in a rush after receiving a message from an arrival. There Reinhard finds a parcel. Excited, he looks at the parcel's content. Besides a cake and some personal items the parcel also contains letters from Elizabeth and his mother. In her letter Elisabeth complains about the death of the bird which Reinhard gave her as a present. Furthermore, she reproaches him for not writing fairy tales for her anymore. He is overwhelmed by a desire to return home. Immediately, he writes letters to Elisabeth and his mother after taking a walk, during which he gives half of the cake to a beggar girl.

At Easter, after a long-awaited time, Reinhard returns to see Elisabeth. However, they seem to have grown apart. In Reinhard's absence, his old schoolfriend Erich has inherited his father's farm at Immensee. Erich gave a new bird to Elisabeth. Reinhard entrusts his personal diary to Elisabeth, who is unsettled by the many poems he dedicated to her. When he asks her to hand him the book back, she returns it to him along with his favourite flower. Shortly before his departure Reinhard makes Elisabeth promise that she will still love him after his two-year absence. He leaves having told her that he has a secret, which he vows to tell her upon his return. Two more years pass by with no more correspondence between the two of them, then Reinhard gets a letter from his mother about Elisabeth and Erich's engagement. Elisabeth had twice rejected Erich's proposal.

A few years later Reinhard accepts Erich's invitation to Immensee without Elisabeth and her mother knowing. Elisabeth is very happy about Reinhard's unexpected arrival. Reinhard has collected several poems and songs over the last few years and now he is asked to perform some of his latest folksongs. With the evening drawing near, Reinhard recites some verses of a romantic drama, prompting Elisabeth to leave the small party embarrassed. Shortly afterwards, Reinhard is on his way down to the lake where he tries to reach a water lily by swimming into the middle. He cannot reach it and returns to the shore scared.

The following afternoon Reinhard and Elisabeth go for a walk on the other side of the lake. Discovering a field of erica (or winter heather) and listening to Reinhard's words about lost youth bring tears to Elisabeth's eyes. In silence they make their way back to the house by boat but Reinhard returns alone later.

During the whole time at the manor Reinhard is not able to express his thoughts. He decides to abandon Immensee early next morning, leaving a note behind but Elisabeth surprises him when she anticipates his plan to depart and never come back. He withdraws himself from her sight stepping outside and taking off.

At late dusk, in his mind's eye, the old man once more catches sight of the water lily on the lake through the window. The lily seems to be close but still unreachable. He remembers his bygone youth and delves into his studies, to which he dedicated a lot of time in the past.

== Adaptations ==
Because of its rich symbolism, the work has been interpreted a number of ways, including three film adaptations for political propaganda purposes. These include the 1943 film Immensee: A German Folk Song, directed by Veit Harlan during the Nazi years. The 1999 Bollywood film, Hum Dil De Chuke Sanam (or I Have Already Given My Heart, Sweetheart in English) is a loose adaptation of the story's theme.
