= Hans Nielsen (actor) =

German actor (1911–1965)

- Born: Hans Antonio Nielsen Capicenio; 30 November 1911; Hamburg, German Empire
- Died: 11 October 1965 (aged 53); West Berlin, West Germany
- Occupation: Actor
- Years active: 1937–1965

Hans Albert Nielsen (30 November 1911 – 11 October 1965) was a German film actor. He appeared in more than 130 films between 1937 and 1965.

== Biography ==
Hans Antonio Nielsen Capicenio was born in Hamburg, Germany. He first got an education in business, but afterward, began taking private acting lessons from Albrecht Schoenhals and Erich Ziegel. He made his stage debut in Hamburg in 1932, after which he worked in Augsburg, Kiel, Leipzig, Berlin, Munich and Düsseldorf. Many actors and performing artists fled Nazi Germany, but Nielsen remained. He made his film debut in 1937 in Daphne and the Diplomat, followed by German movies, such as Heimat (with Zarah Leander), Friedrich Schiller – The Triumph of a Genius (with Horst Caspar) and The Great King (with Otto Gebühr).

After World War II, Nielsen performed in a Kabarett group, Die Außenseiter ("The Outsider") and played in revues by cabaret artist Günter Neumann. He resumed his successful film acting career in 1947, appearing in In Those Days, a drama by Helmut Käutner. He often played roles that were good-natured, likeable and elegant, such as the presiding judge in the 1953 satire Hocuspocus with Curt Goetz; the criminal defense attorney in Confess, Doctor Corda; a police inspector with Christopher Lee in Sherlock Holmes and the Deadly Necklace; the police chief in Scotland Yard Hunts Dr. Mabuse and a judge in The Juvenile Judge, with Heinz Rühmann. He also worked with Curd Jürgens and Lilo Pulver in a film version of Conrad Ferdinand Meyer's Gustav Adolf's Page. He also appeared in a few Karl May films and in Edgar Wallace's The Indian Scarf, Das Phantom von Soho and The Door with Seven Locks. His only Hollywood film was Town Without Pity (1961) with Kirk Douglas.

In addition to his own film roles, in 1948, Nielsen began working as a voice actor, dubbing films into German, including Fred Astaire (Funny Face and Daddy Long Legs); Gary Cooper (Cloak and Dagger, among others); Errol Flynn (The Adventures of Robin Hood, Adventures of Don Juan, among others); Cary Grant (Crisis); Rex Harrison (Cleopatra); Phil Silvers (Cover Girl); David Niven (The King's Thief, among others), Tyrone Power (The Mark of Zorro and Prince of Foxes, among others); James Stewart (in The Philadelphia Story and Anatomy of a Murder, among others); Robert Taylor (Quo Vadis), Spencer Tracy (Malaya); Orson Welles (Citizen Kane) and Trevor Howard (The Third Man).

== Selected filmography ==
- Daphne and the Diplomat (1937) – Achim Hell
- Tango Notturno (1937) – Billy Sefton – Fliegeroffizier
- The Mystery of Betty Bonn (1938) – Jack Winsloe – Schriftsteller
- Heimat (1938) – Max von Wendlowsky
- Red Orchids (1938) – Antonio – Marias Bruder
- Freight from Baltimore (1938) – Kurt Engström
- Rubber (1938) – Kapitän Murray
- A Prussian Love Story (1938) – Kronprinz Friedrich Wilhelm – sein Sohn
- Uproar in Damascus (1939) – Hauptmann Schulz
- Fasching (1939) – Martin
- Dein Leben gehört mir (1939)
- Alarm at Station III (1939) – Hauptmann Karsten
- Mein Mann darf es nicht wissen (1940) – Willi Ulbrich
- Trenck the Pandur (1940) – Laudon
- Falstaff in Vienna (1940) – Otto Nicolai
- Friedrich Schiller – The Triumph of a Genius (1940) – Student Scharffenstein
- Ich klage an (1941) – Dr. Höfer
- The Great King (1942) – Niehoff
- The Night in Venice (1942) – Dr. Nikolaus Roll, genannt Niki, Kaufmann
- Titanic (1943) – 1st Officer Petersen
- I'll Carry You in My Arms (1943) – Dr. Hermnann Hartung
- Light of Heart (1943) – Professor Faber
- Harald Arrives at Nine (1944) – Lawyer Dr. Tromsa
- Music in Salzburg (1944) – Dr. Franz Mädler
- Der Engel mit dem Saitenspiel (1944) – Bernhard Zoller
- Dr. phil. Doederlein (1945)
- Der Scheiterhaufen (1945)
- In Those Days (1947) – Wolfgang Grunelius / 2. Geschichte
- King of Hearts (1947) – König Peter Petroni
- Chemistry and Love (1948) – Dr. Alland
- Unser Mittwochabend (1948) – Georg
- Die kupferne Hochzeit (1948) – Otto
- Das kleine Hofkonzert (1948) – Leutnant Walter von Arneck
- Heimliches Rendezvous (1949) – Schulrat
- Keepers of the Night (1949) – Pfarrer Johannes Heger
- Five Suspects (1950) – Kriminalrat Thomsen
- Crown Jewels (1950) – Willroy
- Die Tat des Anderen (1951) – Schriftsteller Mönk
- Das späte Mädchen (1951) – Dr. Hans Ahlgrimm
- All Clues Lead to Berlin (1952) – Kriminalrat Dr. Wangen
- The Blue Hour (1953) – Paul
- Hocuspocus (1953) – Gerichtspräsident
- The Divorcée (1953) – Lucas
- Secretly Still and Quiet (1953) – Harry Vondenhoff
- Die heilige Lüge (1954)
- The First Kiss (1954) – Escher
- Marriage Impostor (1954) – Dr. Peter Krüger
- Geliebtes Fräulein Doktor (1954) – Direktor Dr. Franke
- Stopover in Orly (1955) – Eugène Boreau
- My Children and I (1955) – Wilhelm Roecker
- Roman einer Siebzehnjährigen (1955) – Eduard Schenk
- Devil in Silk (1956) – Dr. Zacharias
- Die wilde Auguste (1956) – Direktor Roland
- Vergiß wenn Du kannst (1956) – Kunstmaler Bastian Weghart
- Before Sundown (1956) – Dr. Steynitz, Sanitätsrat
- Hochzeit auf Immenhof (1956) – Pankraz
- My Brother Joshua (1956) – Der Pfarrer
- Kleines Zelt und große Liebe (1956) – Karins Vater
- A Heart Returns Home (1956) – Martin Thomas
- Die liebe Familie (1957) – Karl Lang
- Made in Germany (1957)
- Queen Louise (1957) – Hardenberg
- Glücksritter (1957) – Dr. Dreher
- Tolle Nacht (1957) – Mr. Vanderbilt
- Anders als du und ich (1957) – Max Mertens
- Von allen geliebt (1957) – Dr. Johannes Fürst
- At the Green Cockatoo by Night (1957) – Eduard Reichmann, Onkel
- Kein Auskommen mit dem Einkommen! (1957) – Helmut Jäger
- Zwei Matrosen auf der Alm (1958)
- Two Hearts in May (1958) – Direktor Leisemann
- Heart Without Mercy (1958) – Dr. Waagemann
- Confess, Doctor Corda (1958) – Lawyer Dr. Nagel
- Schmutziger Engel (1958) – Direktor Schorlemmer
- Man in the River (1958) – Egon Iversen
- The Girl from the Marsh Croft (1958) – Amtmann Lindgren
- That Won't Keep a Sailor Down (1958) – Pastor Paulsen
- Der lachende Vagabund (1958) – Otto Vogelsang
- I'll Carry You in My Arms (1958) – Dr. Compagnuolo
- Frau im besten Mannesalter (1959) – (uncredited)
- The Scarlet Baroness (1959) – Professor Reimer
- Court Martial (1959) – Dr. Wilhelmi, Defense Lawyer
- Verbrechen nach Schulschluß (1959) – Landgerichtsdirektor Dr. Senftenberg
- The Forests Sing Forever (1959) – Major Barre
- The Blue Sea and You (1959) – Direktor Heidebrink
- Love Now, Pay Later (1959) – Bernbeil, ein Industrieller
- Heimat – Deine Lieder (1959) – Pauls Vater
- At Blonde Kathrein's Place (1959) – Der baron
- Adorable Arabella (1959) – Vater Hagemann
- The Juvenile Judge (1960) – District Court President Dr. Otto Schmittler
- Mistress of the World (1960) – Colonel Dagget
- I Learned That in Paris (1960) – Professor Giselius
- Die zornigen jungen Männer (1960) – Pflueger
- Freddy and the Melody of the Night (1960) – Direktor Wendlandt
- The Inheritance of Bjorndal (1960) – Major a.D. Barre
- Mal drunter – mal drüber (1960) – Herr Kronsdorf
- Gauner-Serenade (1960) – Pappi
- Gustav Adolf's Page (1960) – Bürgermeister Leublfing
- Town Without Pity (1961) – Karl Steinhof
- You Must Be Blonde on Capri (1961) – Bernard Wagner
- Barbara (1961) – Mikkelsen
- This Time It Must Be Caviar (1961) – Narrator (voice)
- Ich kann nicht länger schweigen (1962) – Gerichtspräsident
- Aurora Marriage Bureau (1962) – Dr. Burgmüller, Anwalt
- The Door with Seven Locks (1962) – Mr. Haveloc
- Doctor Sibelius (1962) – Dr. Reinhardt
- So toll wie anno dazumal (1962) – Brenders
- Liebling, ich muß dich erschießen (1962) – Chefportier Jenner
- The Brain (1962) – Immerman
- Sherlock Holmes and the Deadly Necklace (1962) – Inspector Cooper
- His Best Friend (1962) – Direktor Imhoff
- Only a Woman (1962) – Dr. Katz, Nervenarzt
- Dr (1962) – Dr. Rajser
- Storm Over Ceylon (1963) – Professor Ferlach
- The Strangler of Blackmoor Castle (1963) – Tavish
- The Indian Scarf (1963) – Mr. Tilling
- Scotland Yard Hunts Dr. Mabuse (1963) – Chef von Scotland Yard
- Die Nacht am See (1963)
- The Phantom of Soho (1964) – Lord Harald Malhaus
- Destination Death (1964) – Major a. D. Friedrich Hackländer
- Old Shatterhand (1964) – Gen. Taylor (voice, uncredited)
- Ein Frauenarzt klagt an (1964) – Dr. Kraus
- The Monster of London City (1964) – Dorne
- Bullets Don't Argue (1964) – Rev. Alvarez
- The Seventh Victim (1964) – Reverend Turner
- 100 Horsemen (1964) – Alfonso Ordoñez, alcalde
- The Treasure of the Aztecs (1965) – Don Pedro Arbellez
- Hotel of Dead Guests (1965) – Inspector Forbesa
- The Pyramid of the Sun God (1965) – Don Pedro Arbellez
- Five Thousand Dollars on One Ace (1965) – Juez Keystone
- The Hell of Manitoba (1965) – Mayor
