= Großer Preis der Deutschen Akademie für Kinder- und Jugendliteratur e.V. Volkach =

Großer Preis der Deutschen Akademie für Kinder- und Jugendliteratur e.V. Volkach is a Bavarian literary prize.

== Winners ==
- 1976: Walter Scherf
- 1977: Barbara Mandler-Bondy, Sybil Gräfin Schönfeldt
- 1978: Willi Fährmann, Hans-Georg Noack
- 1979: Anna Krüger, Max Lüthi
- 1980: Michael Ende
- 1981: Richard Bamberger, Cesar Bresgen
- 1982: Barbara Bartos-Höppner
- 1983: Kurt Lütgen
- 1984: Herbert Holzing
- 1985: Ludwig Denecke, Heinz Rölleke
- 1986: Internationale Jugendbibliothek of Munich
- 1987: Paul Maar
- 1988: Otfried Preußler
- 1989: Heinz Wegehaupt
- 1990: Sigrid Heuck
- 1991: Helme Heine
- 1992: Josef Guggenmos
- 1993: Hans-Peter Thiel
- 1994: Arnulf Zitelmann
- 1995: Käthe Recheis
- 1996: James Krüss
- 1997: Margret and Rolf Rettich
- 1998: Walter Kahn
- 1999: Klaus Kordon
- 2000: Max Kruse
- 2001: Mirjam Pressler
- 2002: Rudolf Herfurtner
- 2003: Renate Welsh
- 2004: Binette Schröder
- 2005: Max Bolliger
- 2006: Chen Jun
- 2007: Nikolaus Heidelbach
- 2008: Kirsten Boie
- 2009: Gudrun Pausewang
- 2010: Klaus Ensikat
- 2011: Peter Härtling
