= Walther Kiaulehn =

German journalist and writer

Walther Kiaulehn (July 4, 1900 in Berlin – December 7, 1968 in Munich) was a German journalist and writer.

== Biography ==
After completing his studies as an electrician, Kiaulehn chose to work as journalist. In 1924, he started writing for Berliner Abendblatt (Berlin Evening Newspaper), and then between 1930 and 1933 for B.Z. am Mittag (Berlin Noon Newspaper). His pen name during this time was "Lehnau".

At the end of the 1930s, Kiaulehn worked as occasional speaker of the weekly UFA Wochenschau newsreel, as well as for various Nazi documentaries (Kulturfilme).

He spent the years 1939 and 1940 as a soldier. From 1940 to 1942-43 he served as a reporter with special status for the foreign Nazi magazine Signal, published in France, Belgium, occupied territories of the Soviet Union and in the Balkans. In 1943, Propaganda Minister Joseph Goebbels assigned him to work on scripts for indispensable propagandistic Kulturfilme. The rest of the war he spent as military editor of the Signal in Berlin. In 1944 he was primarily responsible with the magazine's articles related to Berlin's stand-up.

In 1945, after the end of World War II, Kiaulehn moved to Munich. There, he worked as an actor in the "small comedy" and in public theatre, and as cabaret artist, in which quality he played in 1946 in a program of the legendary cabaret Schaubude. He also played parts in various post-war movies. In the 1950s he was head of the arts section at Münchner Merkur, where he worked as a redactor and theater critic until his death in 1968.

== Works ==
- lean from comfort booklet and laughter book (feuilletons). Berlin: Ernst Rowohlt, 1932. (The book became 1933 of national socialists and seize.)
- reader for Lächler . Berlin: Ernst Rowohlt publishing house, 1938.
- Die eisernen Engel: Geburt, Geschichte und Macht der Maschinen von der Antike bis zur Goethezeit (The Iron Angels: birth, history and power of the machines from antiquity to the time of Goethe). Berlin: Deutscher Verlag, 1935.
- Berlin. The Story [Fate] of a Metropolitan City. 1958.
- Rüdesheimer of fragments (with designs of Heinrich count Luckner). Berlin: Ernst Staneck publishing house, 1961.
- my friend of the publishers. Ernst Rowohlt and its time. Reinbek with Hamburg: Rowohlt publishing house, 1967.
- praise of the quiet city (feuilletons from the publications from 1932 to 1938, hrsg. of Detlef Bluhm). Berlin: Fannei & roll, 1989, ISBN 3-927574-00-7.
- Berlin - praise of the quiet city (follows the expenditure of Fannei & roll from 1989; likewise hrsg. of Detlef Bluhm). Frankfurt/Main: Schöffling & CO., 1998.

== Filmography ==
as actor:

- 1947 - Between Yesterday and Tomorrow
- 1948 - Das verlorene Gesicht
- 1949 - Tragödie einer Leidenschaft
- 1949 - Du bist nicht allein
- 1949 - Heimliches Rendezvous
- 1950 - Trouble in Paradise
- 1950 - The Falling Star
- 1951 - Fanfares of Love
- 1955 - Ein Weihnachtslied in Prosa
- 1955 - Lola Montès (uncredited)

as writer:

- 1936 - Kopfjäger von Borneo
- 1938 - Aus der Heimat des Freischütz
