= Die Singphoniker =

Male classical vocal ensemble based in Munich

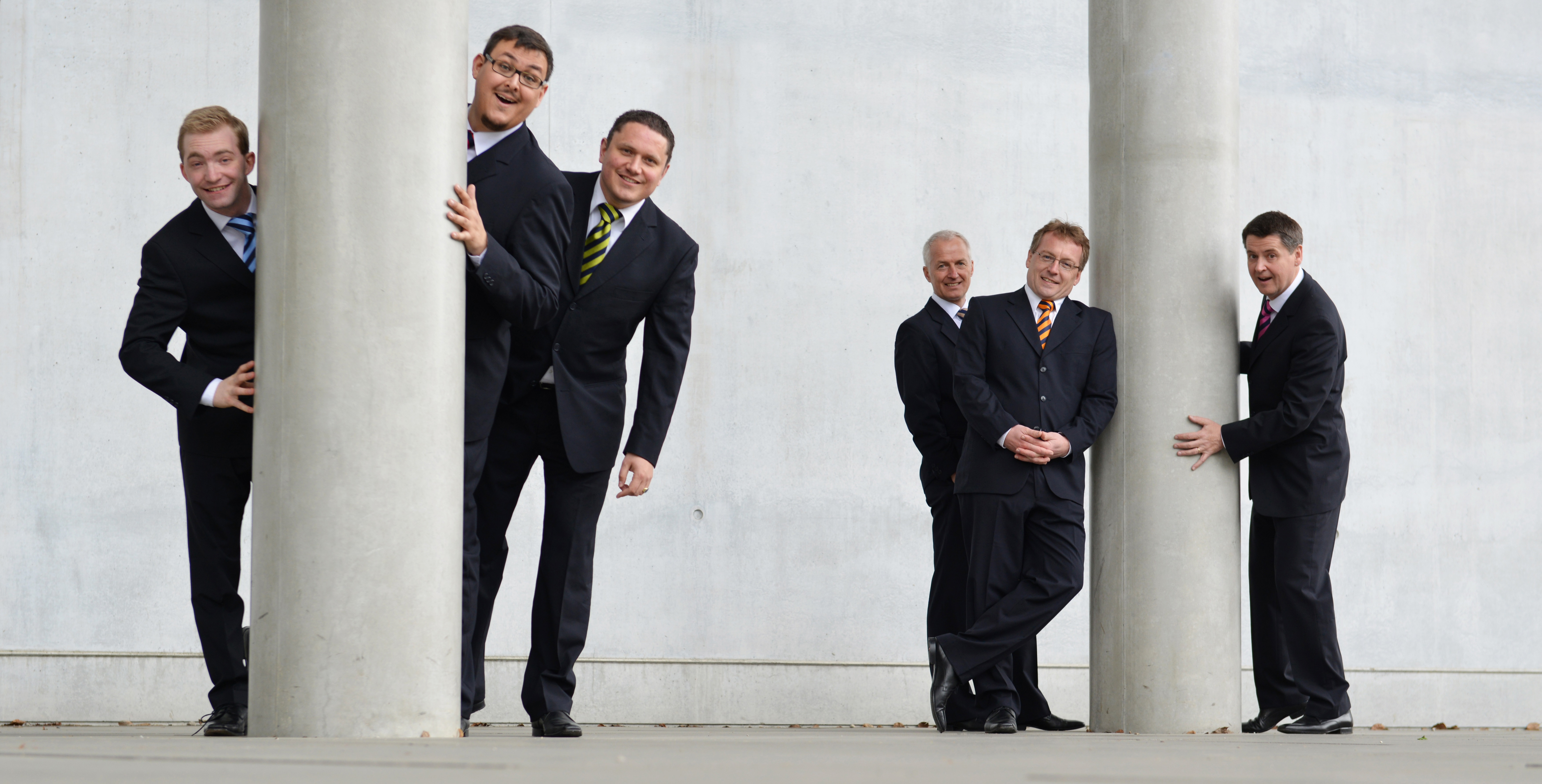
- Singphoniker in 2014

Background information
- Origin: Munich, Germany
- Genres: a cappella music
- Years active: 1980 – present
- Website: www.singphoniker.de

Die Singphoniker is a German male classical vocal ensemble based in Munich, founded in 1980 by six students of the Musikhochschule München, after the model of the Comedian Harmonists. They sing a broad repertory, from Gregorian chant to contemporary music, including Volkslieder, Christmas carols, pop music and other crossover projects. Composers such as Enjott Schneider, Max Beckschäfer and Wilfried Hiller wrote music for them. Their name alludes to "Symphoniker", inserting "sing" into a typical German name for a symphony orchestra.

== Performances ==
Die Singphoniker appeared in 1995 at the Rheingau Musik Festival, singing Gregorian chant to a recitation by Gert Westphal in Eberbach Abbey. In 1999 they made their debut in New York at the Frick Collection, performing works by Schumann, Schubert and Mendelssohn as well as the Berliner Requiem by Kurt Weill on texts by Bertolt Brecht and songs of the Comedian Harmonists.

== Recordings ==
The ensemble recorded Edvard Grieg's part songs for male voices in 2002. A review observed that they "define ensemble unity as well as interpretive acuity" and mentioned their "impeccable vocalism and outstanding ensemble singing".

They recorded Franz Schubert's 95 complete part songs for male voices, which were intended to be sung by soloists, because the Congress of Vienna restricted all-male groups, even male choruses. A review of the recording noted that the singers "have been together almost twenty years and the members' voices have the rich sound and perfect blend of a string ensemble".

They recorded Singphonic Christmas, European Christmas carols, combined with harp music by Wilfred Hiller and Benjamin Britten, in settings by Nélida Béjar and Max Beckschäfer, among others. A reviewer praised their "singing, so perfectly balanced, the voices ideally matched, the expression so vibrant and compelling." In 2013 they recorded secular songs by Josef Rheinberger, several of them as first recordings.

Most of their albums have been published by the label Classic Produktion Osnabrück (cpo), except some by Oehms Classics, both independent German classic music labels.

== Music composed for Die Singphoniker ==
Enjott Schneider composed for the ensemble Variationen über die Liebe, premiered in 1984. In 2005 they sang the premiere of Wilfred Hiller's church opera Augustinus. Max Beckschäfer composed for them in 1992 "Frammenti e Stanze di Michelangelo" for 6 voices, in 2000 "Shakespeare Songs" (7 songs from plays by Shakespeare) for 4 male voices and piano, and in 2007 both "Fleur de quinze ans", a madrigal after a poem by Clément Marot, and arrangements of four European Christmas carols.

== Singers ==
The ensemble typically performs as a sextet. The current singers are:

- Johannes Euler, counter-tenor
- Daniel Schreiber, tenor
- Henning Jensen, tenor
- Berno Scharpf, baritone (and piano)
- Michael Mantaj, bass-baritone
- Christian Schmidt, bass

Former members are:

- Markus Geitner, counter-tenor
- Alfons Brandl, tenor
- Christoph Rösel, tenor
- Bernhard Hofmann, tenor
- Hubert Nettinger, tenor
- Manuel Warwitz, tenor
- Ludwig Thomas, baritone
- Gunnar Mühling, bass-baritone
- Franz-Xaver Lechner, bass (and piano)

== Prizes and awards ==
- 1987: Platte des Monats (Record of the month) of the magazine Stereoplay for "Concert Collection"
- 1991: First prize of the competition in Gorizia in the category vocal ensembles
- 1994: Diapason d'Or for the CD "Singphonic Mendelssohn"
- 1997: Grand Prix du Disque „Charles Cros“ by Radio France for the complete vocal music by Franz Schubert
- 1998: Preis der Bayerischen Volksstiftung
