= The Last Summer (1954 film) =

1954 film

- Directed by: Harald Braun
- Written by: Ricarda Huch (novelette); Harald Braun; George Hurdalek; Emil Burri
- Produced by: Harald Braun
- Starring: Hardy Krüger; Liselotte Pulver; Mathias Wieman
- Cinematography: Werner Krien
- Edited by: Hilwa von Boro
- Music by: Werner Eisbrenner
- Production company: N.D.F.-Produktion
- Distributed by: Bavaria Film
- Release date: 29 October 1954
- Running time: 110 minutes
- Country: West Germany
- Language: German

The Last Summer (German: Der letzte Sommer) is a 1954 West German drama film directed by Harald Braun and starring Hardy Krüger, Liselotte Pulver and Mathias Wieman. It was shot at the Bavaria Studios in Munich. The film's sets were designed by the art directors Kurt Herlth and Robert Herlth.

== Cast ==
- Hardy Krüger as Rikola Valbo
- Liselotte Pulver as Jessika Tolemainen, Tochter
- Mathias Wieman as President Carlo Tolemainen
- Brigitte Horney as Tatjana Tolemainen
- René Deltgen as Gawan Massi
- Nadja Tiller as Anja, seine Schwester
- Werner Hinz as Der Innenminister
- Paul Bildt as Vittunen, Klavierstimmer
- Leonard Steckel as Kommissar Berki
- Käthe Haack as Frau Lundgreen
- Uta Hallant as KatjaTolemainen, Tochter
- Rolf Henniger as Olaf Lundgreen, Ministerialrat
- Peter Arens as Der Major
- Claus Biederstaedt as Der Leutnant
- Heidi Brühl as Jessikas Schwester
- Kurt Horwitz as Der Bischof
- Nicolas Koline as Stepan, der Diener
- Alfred Menhardt as Der Lagerverwalter

== See also ==
- The Guardian Angel (1990)

== Bibliography ==
- Goble, Alan (1999). The Complete Index to Literary Sources in Film. Walter de Gruyter. ISBN 978-3-11-095194-3.
