= Erich Ponto =

German actor

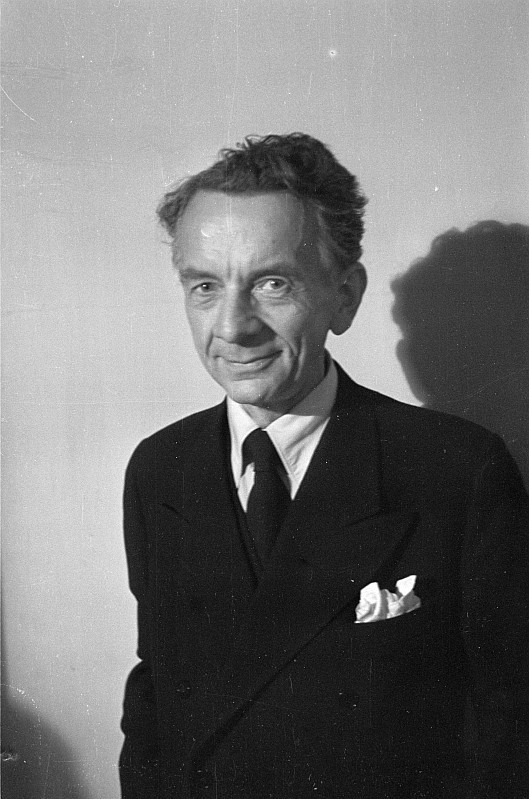
- Ponto in July 1945
- Born: Erich Johannes Bruno Ponto; 14 December 1884; Free City of Lübeck, German Empire
- Died: 14 February 1957 (aged 72); Stuttgart, Baden-Württemberg, West Germany
- Resting place: Tolkewitz cemetery, Dresden
- Occupation: Actor
- Years active: 1908–1957
- Spouse: Tony Kresse
- Children: 2
- Awards: Baden-Württemberg State actor (1952); Federal Cross of Merit (1954); Deutscher Filmpreis (1956)

Erich Johannes Bruno Ponto (14 December 1884 – 14 February 1957) was a German film and stage actor.

== Career ==
Erich Ponto was born in Lübeck as the son of a textile merchant. After his family had moved to Hamburg-Eimsbüttel, he attended the gymnasium secondary school in Altona and upon his Abitur exam began a study of pharmacy at the Ludwig-Maximilians-Universität München, where he went to lectures delivered by physicist Wilhelm Röntgen, whose discovery of X-rays or Röntgen rays, had earned him the inaugural Nobel Prize in Physics in 1901. Ponto worked for a few years as a pharmacist, but was already passionate about acting during his university time – he started to take acting lessons and eventually became a full-time actor.

Ponto gave his debut on stage at the Stadttheater Passau in 1908, followed by engagements in Nordhausen, Reichenberg (Liberec), and Düsseldorf. From 1914 to 1947 he was a member of the Hoftheater Dresden ensemble (Staatstheater Dresden from 1918), in the season 1946/47 also as intendant. On stage, his most famous role was that of J.J. Peachum in the original production of Bertolt Brecht's The Threepenny Opera in 1928. During the Third Reich, he won the title of a Staatsschauspieler in 1938, the highest title that could be awarded to a stage actor in Nazi-Germany. Later stage roles included Nathan the Wise in 1945 and Willy Loman in Death of a Salesman in 1950.

Ponto only started to appear in films regularly after the start of the sound film, when he was already middle-aged. He became a well-known character actor in German cinema of the 1930s and 1940s, often in eccentric or villainous roles. Among his roles were Mayer Amschel Rothschild in the antisemitic Nazi film The Rothschilds (1940) and a stuffy school teacher in Die Feuerzangenbowle (1944) with Heinz Rühmann, widely regarded as a film classic in Germany. After World War II, he appeared in Carol Reed's British thriller The Third Man (1949), playing a sinister physician in a supporting role. In 1955 Ponto won the German Film Award as the "Best male actor in a Supporting role" for Himmel ohne Sterne (1955). He worked as an actor until shortly before his death.

As a synchronisation actor, Ponto dubbed English-language actors like Lionel Barrymore, Charles Laughton and Charley Grapewin in a number of films between the mid 1930s and early 1950s.

== Personal life ==
In 1916, he married Tony Kresse; they had two children. Ponto also worked as an acting teacher; among his students was Gert Fröbe of Goldfinger fame. Ponto's final film was Der Stern von Afrika, released in the year of his death. He died at the age of 72 after a long cancer illness. Erich Ponto was the uncle of Dresdner Bank general director Jürgen Ponto, who was murdered by members of the communist RAF in 1977.

== Selected filmography ==
- Der Geiger von Meissen (1921)
- Woman in the Jungle (1931) – Joyce
- The Man Who Murdered (1931) – Boucher
- Love, Death and the Devil (1934) – The Old Man
- Santa Joana D'Arc (1935) – Lord Talbot
- The King's Prisoner (1935) – Friseur
- The Last Four on Santa Cruz (1936) – Alexander Ghazaroff
- Schlußakkord (1936) – Jury President
- The Hound of the Baskervilles (1937) – Stapleton
- Tango Notturno (1937) – Poor Man
- The Mystery of Betty Bonn (1938) – Capitain Spurling
- By a Silken Thread (1938) – Theodor Kalbach
- The Four Companions (1938) – Alfred Hintze
- Dreizehn Mann und eine Kanone (1938)
- Hallo Janine (1939) – Mr. Pamion
- Wibbel the Tailor (1939) – Schneider Anton Wibbel
- In letzter Minute (1939) – Alexander Piepenbrink
- The Fire Devil (1940) – Emperor Napoleon Bonaparte
- Die Rothschilds (1940) – Mayer Amschel Rothschild
- Aus erster Ehe (1940) – Professor Skutor
- Wie konntest Du, Veronika! (1940) – Banker
- Achtung! Feind hört mit! (1940) – Mr. Bock
- Kleider machen Leute (1940)
- The Girl from Barnhelm (1940) – Wirt
- Das Herz der Königin (1940) – Singer
- Blutsbrüderschaft (1941) – Director Gösch
- Ich klage an (1941) – Professor Werther
- Leichte Muse (1941) – Chorleiter Palitsch
- Her Other Self (1941) – Geheimrat Wuellner
- The Night in Venice (1942) – Director Arnold Richard Schmitz
- The Rainer Case (1942) – Hotel Director
- Attack on Baku (1942) – Jenssen
- Der große Schatten (1942) – Oswald Siebel
- Diesel (1942) – Theodor Diesel
- Ein glücklicher Mensch (1943) – Pauly
- Die beiden Schwestern (1943) – Adolph Menzel
- Die Feuerzangenbowle (1944) – Professor Crey – called Schnauz
- The Master Detective (1944) – Gutsbesitzer Theobald Langendorff
- Philharmonic (1944) – Straehle
- Der Engel mit dem Saitenspiel (1944) – Barnabas
- Am Abend nach der Oper (1945) – Stephan Schneider
- Der Scheiterhaufen (1945)
- Der Fall Molander (unfinished film, 1945) – Dannemann
- Between Yesterday and Tomorrow (1947) – Professor von Walther
- Film Without a Title (1948) – Mr. Schichtholz
- The Lost Face (1948) – Scientific
- Die kupferne Hochzeit (1948) – Alter Lehrer
- The Court Concert (1948) – Serenissimus
- Love '47 (1949) – Old Man
- The Third Man (1949) – Dr. Winkel
- Verspieltes Leben (1949) – Mathematic Professor
- Second Hand Destiny (1949) – Professor Sapis
- Hans im Glück (1949)
- Tobias Knopp – Abenteuer eines Junggesellen (1950) – Plünne (voice)
- Beloved Liar (1950) – Plage
- Doctor Praetorius (1950) – Professor Speiter
- Das fremde Leben (1951) – Prosecutor Knopp
- Veronika the Maid (1951)
- Primanerinnen (1951) – Krautkopf
- No Greater Love (1952) – Minister
- Weekend in Paradise (1952) – Giersdorfs Onkel
- House of Life (1952) – Geheimrat Merk
- Monks, Girls and Hungarian Soldiers (1952) – Fellerer
- The Blue and White Lion (1952) – Government President
- The Great Temptation (1952) – Professor Dr. Gandolphi
- Not Afraid of Big Animals (1953) – Police Commissioner
- Hocuspocus (1953) – Mr. Arthur Graham
- Sauerbruch – Das war mein Leben (1954) – Chefarzt Psychiatrie
- Love is Forever (1954)
- The Flying Classroom (1954) – Medical Councilman
- Keine Angst vor Schwiegermüttern (1954)
- The Missing Miniature (1954)
- The Golden Plague (1954) – Dr. Sierich
- Sky Without Stars (1955) – Father Otto Kaminski
- Ballerina (1956) – Schimanski
- If We All Were Angels (1956) – Magistrate
- Made in Germany (1957) – Professor Virchow
- The Girl and the Legend (1957) – Daniel Defoe
- The Zurich Engagement (1957) – (uncredited)
- Der Stern von Afrika (1957) – Old Frenchman (final film role)
