= The Rider on the White Horse (1934 film) =

- Scene from a film
- German: Der Schimmelreiter
- Directed by: Hans Deppe; Curt Oertel
- Written by: Hans Deppe; Curt Oertel
- Based on: The Rider on the White Horse by Theodor Storm
- Starring: Mathias Wieman; Marianne Hoppe; Ali Ghito
- Cinematography: Alexander von Lagorio
- Music by: Winfried Zillig
- Production company: Fritsch-Tonfilm
- Release date: 12 January 1934
- Running time: 86 minutes
- Country: Germany
- Language: German

The Rider on the White Horse (German: Der Schimmelreiter) is a 1934 German drama film written and directed by Hans Deppe and Curt Oertel and starring Mathias Wieman, Marianne Hoppe and Ali Ghito.

It was based on the novel of the same name by Theodor Storm. The film's sets were designed by the art director Gabriel Pellon. It was shot on location in Schleswig-Holstein.

== Cast ==
- Mathias Wieman as Hauke Haien
- Marianne Hoppe as Elke
- Ali Ghito as Vollina
- Hans Deppe as Knecht Iven
- Walther Süssenguth as Ole Peters
- Wilhelm Diegelmann as Tede Volkerts
- Eduard von Winterstein as Oberdeichgraf
- Margarethe Albrecht as Base
- Walter Griep as Gypsy
- Walter Werner as Iewe Manners
