= Eva Sindichakis =

Greek woman composer

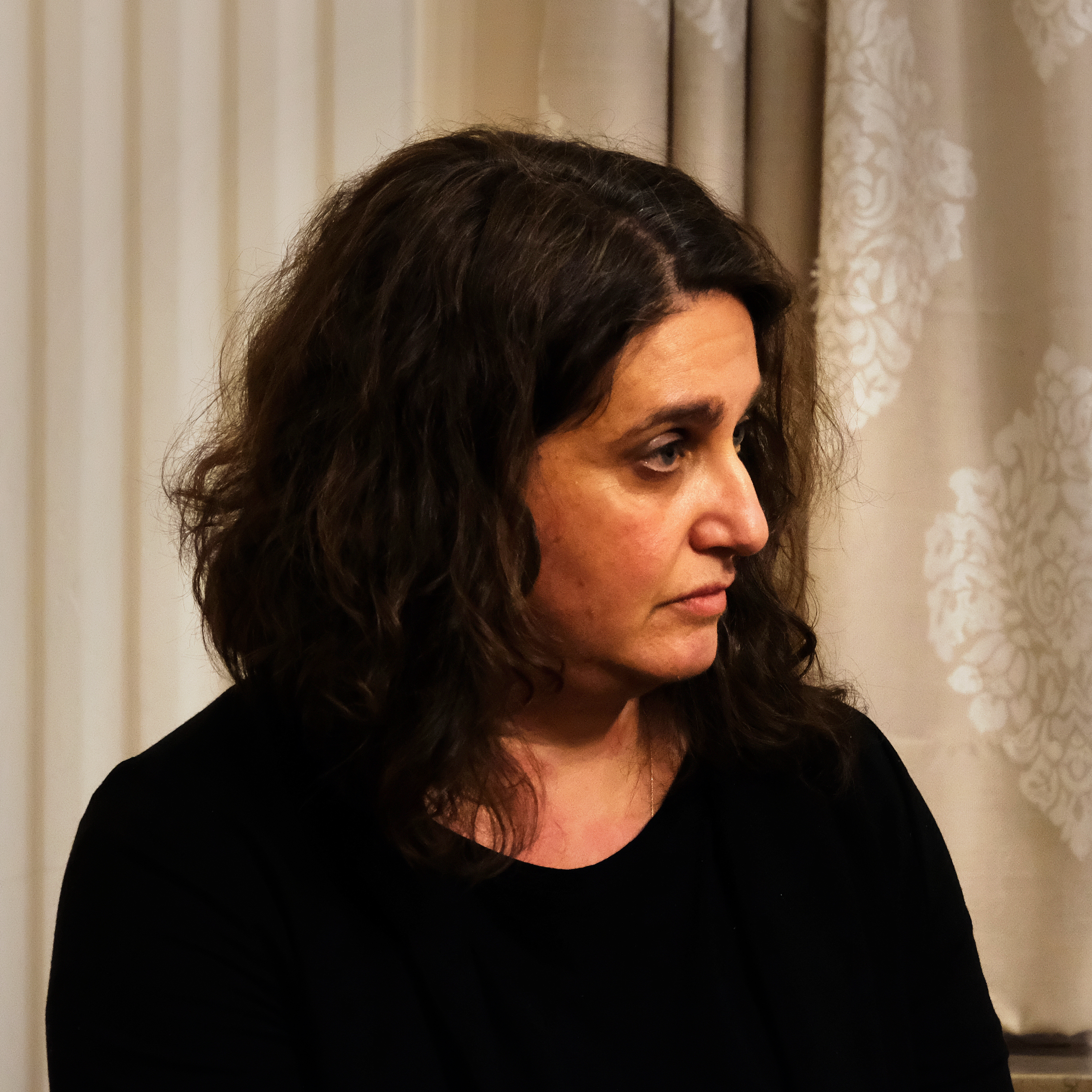
Eva Sindichakis (2024)

Eva Sindichakis (born 1975) is a Greek composer.

== Life ==
Born in Munich, Sindichakis studied musical composition with Wilfried Hiller at the University of Music and Performing Arts Munich. In 2006/2007, she received a Scholarship of the Free State of Bavaria from the Internationales Künstlerhaus Villa Concordia in Bamberg. She received commissions among others for the Academy of Fine Arts, Munich, the Bavarian Music Council, the City of Offenburg. Her works for viola were premiered by Julia Rebekka Adler, to whom she has dedicated several works. In 2002, she collaborated with the director and author Natja Brunckhorst for the feature film La Mer (2002).

Sindichakis has been on the board of the Bavarian Composers' Association since 2008.
