= Wilfried Hiller =

German composer

Wilfried Hiller (born 15 March 1941) is a German composer. He became known above all for his stage works for families, children and young people.

== Life and work ==
Hiller was born the son of the teacher August Hiller and his wife Josepha Hiller, née Hauser, in the Swabian town of Weißenhorn near Ulm. In 1944, the year of the war, his father was killed in Russia and Wilfried became a half-orphan at the age of three. Hiller himself described early childhood experiences in connection with his composition Alkor thus:

When my father was in Russia during the Second World War, every evening at 10 o'clock he looked up at Alkor, that little rider sitting on the drawbar of the big wagon. At the same time, my mother looked up at the star in our Swabian village, and although it shone many light years away from us, the two of them found a common home for minutes with this glimpse into the past. Every day my father wrote a letter home. My mother wanted to send a signal: "We want peace and the child should be called Wilfried!". That Alkor in the Big Dipper is thus my own personal story. My father did not come back from Russia.

=== Training ===
After attending the Gymnasium bei Sankt Stephan (Augsburg), he took up piano studies with Wilhelm Heckmann at the Augsburg Leopold Mozart Centre in 1956. From 1958 to 1961, Hiller wrote his first play with music (Die Räuber von Hiller) as well as piano compositions and chamber music and worked as an organist and ballet répétiteur.

From 1962, he took part in the Darmstädter Ferienkurse for Neue Musik and was a guest student of Pierre Boulez, Bruno Maderna and Karlheinz Stockhausen. During this time he also became acquainted with his later publisher Peter Hanser-Strecker and the composer Karl Amadeus Hartmann. At Hartmann's suggestion, Hiller began studying music at the Hochschule für Musik und Theater München in 1963. Here he studied music composition with Günter Bialas, opera direction with Heinz Arnold, percussion and timpani with Ludwig Porth and Hanns Hölzl, and music theory with Hermann Pfrogner.

As Hiller made known in 2013, he was a victim of sexual abuse at Seminar St. Joseph of the Stephan-Gymnasium.

From 1967 Hiller worked as a percussionist in various orchestras, such as the Bavarian Radio Symphony Orchestra, the Bavarian State Opera and the Staatstheater am Gärtnerplatz. In 1968, he founded the concert series "Musik unserer Zeit".

In 1968 he met Carl Orff, who strongly influenced him in the following years. Hiller worked closely with Orff as his student until his death in 1982 and has chaired the Carl Orff Foundation since 2008.

Hiller's works for music theatre were decisively influenced by his collaboration with his wife, the actress Elisabet Woska, from 1971 onwards.

=== Collaboration with Michael Ende ===
His meeting with the writer Michael Ende in 1978 marked the beginning of a fruitful artistic partnership and close friendship that lasted until Ende's death in 1995 and led to a whole series of successful stage works such as Tranquilla Trampeltreu, Der Goggolori and Das Traumfresserchen.

Hiller has a special relationship with compositions for children and young people. In an interview on the occasion of his 60th birthday, he answered the question of how he manages as a composer to appeal equally to children and adults:

"By simply writing for the child that you have remained yourself... The decisive factor for success is that you get to the point musically, and how the children react, whether they go along enthusiastically – or whether they are bored. Children can be merciless judges."

Hiller considers young listeners and viewers to be self-confident and intelligent and does not want to bore them with a reduced theme or tonal language – neither the multi-layered and dense, yet easily comprehensible libretti Michael Ende's nor his music are "simple" in this sense.

One hundred percent understanding of the text and a clear message are important when composing for children, according to Hiller. The turtle Tranquilla Trampeltreu in the musical fable of the same name, for example, is rewarded for her stubbornness, perseverance and self-discipline despite her unpunctuality – she arrives a whole generation too late for the royal wedding of the lion Leo XXVIII.

Hiller also thinks that musical theatre works for children should definitely contain passages that can be remembered:

"Earworm melodies should be allowed, even though they are considered taboo and people look crossly at you [if you write them]. But there is something to this sentence by Darius Milhaud: "He who cannot write a melody that one can remember cannot be called a composer."

According to Hiller's and Ende's experience, the performance duration of a children's opera should not exceed 80 to 85 minutes.

After Ende's death, Hiller first worked with Herbert Asmodi (The Story of the Little Blue Mountain Lake and the Old Eagle), then, since 1997, with Rudolf Herfurtner. He also drew on literary models by Theodor Storm (The Rider on the White Horse), Christian Morgenstern (Heidenröslein) and Wilhelm Busch (Der Geigenseppel). In addition to the numerous stage works, there are also a large number of chamber musical works, concertos, choir and orchestral works.

By his own account, Hiller is the most frequently performed living German stage composer. His works for children and young people in particular fill a gap in the repertoire, as musically complex children's operas that are nevertheless popular with children are rare, but are urgently needed by the growing number of children's opera projects in the context of increased youth work in opera houses. His works are therefore performed in numerous productions in German-speaking countries. For example, a production of Traumfresserchen was shown in the children's opera tent on the roof of the Vienna State Opera for several seasons to a consistently sold-out audience.

Hiller's church opera Augustinus – Ein klingendes Mosaik about St Augustine premiered in Munich on 19 March 2005.

From 2009, Hiller took over as the new artistic director of the Internationale Orgelwoche Nürnberg (ION). He continues to be artistic director of the Diabelli-Contest, an international composers' competition.

=== Music editor and sound engineer ===
In addition to his work as a freelance composer, Hiller worked as a music editor and sound engineer at the Bayerischer Rundfunk from November 1971 to March 2006. At first, his programmes included upmarket light music and, from 1974, symphonic music; later he was editor for special programmes. In addition, Hiller composed music for the 30-part series Klangbaustelle Klimperton for Schulfunk and was the organiser of the Musica-Viva studio concerts under Wolfgang Fortner. In addition, he founded the series musik unserer zeit, from which the Münchner Musiknächte later emerged, as well as the festival Orff in Andechs.

As an editor at Bayerischer Rundfunk, he was responsible for the following series, among others:

- Münchner Musikgeschichte in Straßennamen
- Dirigenten bei der Probe
- Musik meiner Wahl
- Komponisten machen Programm
- außereuropäische Musik
- musik unserer zeit
- Nachtakzente
- Concerto bavarese
- Festival traditioneller Musik

Hiller is on the board of the Jean Sibelius Society and the Kulturkreis Gasteig. In 1989, he became a member of the Bavarian Academy of Fine Arts, and in 1993 he was appointed composition teacher at the Richard Strauss Conservatory Munich. Since November 2005, he has been president of the Bayerischer Musikrat. Hiller is a member of the board of trustees of the Internationales Künstlerhaus Villa Concordia. Numerous of his students have obtained scholarships there (Nélida Béjar, Dieter Dolezel, Christoph Garbe, Eva Sindichakis, Markus Zahnhausen).

== Works ==
=== Stage work ===
Operas and other works for music theatre:

- An diesem heutigen Tage (premiere 9 January 1974 on ZDF), monodrama for actress and percussion, libretto: Elisabet Woska after Mary Stuart's letters
- Niobe (1978), in ancient Greek
- Ijob (premiere 15 July 1979, Theater im Marstall, München), monodrama for tenor, based on the biblical Book of Job in the translation by Martin Buber; 2nd version: premiere 22 February 1984, Französische Kirche, Bern
- Liebestreu und Grausamkeit (1981), after Wilhelm Busch
- Der Goggolori. Eine bairische Mär mit Musik (premiere 3 February 1985, Theater am Gärtnerplatz, Munich), libretto in bavarian by Michael Ende
- Vervollständigung von Chaplin-Ford-Trott from the Wachsfigurenkabinett by Karl Amadeus Hartmann (1988)
- Die Jagd nach dem Schlarg (1988), libretto: Michael Ende after Lewis Carroll
- Der Rattenfänger (1993), libretto: Michael Ende
- Die Geschichte vom kleinen blauen Bergsee und dem alten Adler (1996), libretto: Herbert Asmodi
- Heidenröslein (1996), after Christian Morgenstern and Johannes Brahms
- Der Schimmelreiter (1998), libretto by Andreas K. W. Meyer after Theodor Storm
- Eduard auf dem Seil (1998), libretto: Rudolf Herfurtner – Opera about Eduard Mörike
- Der Geigenseppel (2000), melodrama for puppets after Wilhelm Busch's poem (Text by Elisabet Woska), commissioned by the cultural programme in the German Pavilion at the World's Fair Expo 2000 in Hannover
- Wolkenstein (premiere 6 March 2004, Opera Nürnberg, director: Percy Adlon) – Opera about Oswald von Wolkenstein
- Augustinus – Ein klingendes Mosaik (premiere 19 March 2005, St. Luke's Church, Munich – Church opera about St Augustine, text: Winfried Böhm.
- Der Sohn des Zimmermanns (premiere 16 March 2010, Würzburg Cathedral – Church opera about Jesus, text: Winfried Böhm, dramaturgical collaboration: Elisabet Woska.
- Momo (premiere 2018, Staatstheater am Gärtnerplatz, Munich), libretto by Wolfgang Adenberg

Music theatre for children and young people:

- Vier musikalische Fabeln nach Texten von Michael Ende, szenisch oder als Hörspiel aufzuführen
  - Der Lindwurm und der Schmetterling oder Der seltsame Tausch (1980, premiere 11 January 1981, Theater am Haidplatz des Stadttheaters Regensburg)
  - Tranquilla Trampeltreu, die beharrliche Schildkröte (premiere 9 July 1981, Stadtmuseum München)
  - Die Ballade von Norbert Nackendick oder Das Nackte Nashorn (premiere 23 September 1982, Rheinisches Marionettentheater, Düsseldorf)
  - Die Fabel von Filemon Faltenreich oder Die Fußballweltmeisterschaft der Fliegen (premiere)
- Die zerstreute Brillenschlange (1981) for narrator, clarinet and drone, text: Michael Ende
- Josa mit der Zauberfiedel (1985)
- Das Traumfresserchen (premiere 5 February 1991, Theater Bremen), libretto: Michael Ende
- Peter Pan (1997), after J. M. Barrie
- Die Waldkinder (1997–1998), "Taschenoper", libretto: Rudolf Herfurtner
- Pinocchio (premiere 12 October 2002, Theatre Trier), after the novel Pinocchio by Carlo Collodi
- Momo (premiere 16 December 2018, Staatstheater am Gärtnerplatz Munich), after the eponymous novel by Michael Ende.

Stage Music and Music for Puppet Theatre:

- Die Räuber von Hiller (1975)
- Wunschpunsch (1990)
- Das Gauklermärchen (1998)
- Momo (2002)

=== Vocal work ===
- Der Leuchtturm (1962–1963) for aaritono and Hammered dulcimer, Neubearbeitung 1997
- Let Thy Song Be Love (1969) for soprano and piano
- Schulamit (1977–1990) for solo singer, choir and orchestra
- Muspilli (1978) for baritone and instruments
- Ein Frosch sah einstmals einen Stier (1979), for solo singers, choir and orchestra
- Trödelmarkt der Träume (1984), song cycle
- Klangbaustelle Klimperton (1996), music for school radio broadcasts
- Sappho-Fragmente' (1997) for girls' choir, flute and cello
- Merseburger Zaubersprüche (1997) for children's choir and brass, setting of the Merseburger Zaubersprüche
- Servietten-Haiku (1997) for soprano and chamber ensemble.
- Aias (2001) for mezzo-soprano, baritone, narrator and orchestra
- Heilige Nacht (2001) for male sextet, speaker and instruments
- Michael-Ende-Liederbuch (2002) for girls' choir, cello and percussion
- Gilgamesh (2002) for baritone and instruments, after the Epic of Gilgamesh

=== Orchestral work ===
- Fanfare (1970) for trumpets, timpani and bass drum
- Nachtgesang (1974)
- München (1990), Suite
- Hintergründige Gedanken des erzbischöflichen Compositeurs Heinrich Ignaz Franz Biber beim Belauschen eines Vogelkonzertes (1991)
- Chagall-Zyklus (1993) for clarinet and chamber orchestra
- Pegasus 51 (1995) for jazz percussion and symphony orchestra
- Fanfare (1996) for brass and timpani
- Enigma Canon (2000), arrangement after Johann Sebastian Bach
- Via Dolorosa (2001)
- Bavariations (2002)
- Tarot XVI (2002) for strings and zither
- Cappella Sistina (2009) Roman frescoes for orchestra, soprano and Quartetto lontano

=== Chamber music ===
- Movements for a Big Cat (1968) for oboe and bassoon
- Pas de deux (1978) for two pianos
- Natura morta con saltiero (1983), quintet
- Lilith (1987) for four strings and piano
- Notenbüchlein für Tamino (1990) for eight flutes
- Niobe (1995), piano trio
- Devil's Toccata (1995) for violin and four percussionists
- Liocorno di Bomarzo (1997) for organ and alphorn
- Book of Stars (from 1999) for one, two or three pianos
- Duetti amorosi (2000/2001) for octet
- Der Tod ist eine schöne Frau (2000) for violin and piano

=== Solo pieces ===
- Elegy (1966) for oboe
- Rhythmizomenon (1966) for piano
- Katalog für Schlagzeug I-V (1966–1975)
- Phantasy (1982) for piano after a cycle of pictures by Wilhelm Busch
- Toccata diabolica (1993) for organ
- Scherzo (1994) for cello
- Toccata cabbalistica sopra la-sol (1994) for organ
- Tarot XVI (2002) for organ
- Ophelia (2003) for violin

== Awards ==
- 1968: Richard-Strauss-Preis der Stadt Munich
- 1971: Förderpreis Musik der Landeshauptstadt München
- 1977: Brünner Preis, Anerkennungspreis der Stadt Salzburg für sein Werk Niobe
- 1978: Stipendiat der Deutschen Akademie Rom Villa Massimo
- 1978: Schwabing Art Prize für Musik
- 1988: Raiffeisen-Förderpreis
- 1997: Werner-Egk-Preis, Kunstpreis der Stadt Donauwörth
- 2000: Bayerischer Poetentaler, Literatenpreis der Münchner Turmschreiber
- 2008: Bayerischer Verdienstorden
- 2010: Bayerischer Maximiliansorden für Wissenschaft und Kunst
- 2013: Oberbayerischer Kulturpreis
