= Her Other Self =

1941 film

- Directed by: Wolfgang Liebeneiner
- Written by: Heinrich Spoerl
- Produced by: Heinrich Jonen
- Starring: Hilde Krahl; Mathias Wieman; Erich Ponto
- Cinematography: Friedl Behn-Grund
- Edited by: Marthe Rau
- Music by: Werner Bochmann
- Production company: Tobis Film
- Distributed by: Tobis Film
- Release date: 21 November 1941
- Running time: 101 minutes
- Country: Germany
- Language: German

Her Other Self (German: Das andere Ich, "The other 'I'") is a 1941 German drama film directed by Wolfgang Liebeneiner and starring Hilde Krahl, Mathias Wieman, and Erich Ponto.

The film's sets were designed by the art director Otto Erdmann and Franz F. Fürst.

== Cast ==
- Hilde Krahl as Magdalena
- Mathias Wieman as Ingenieur Martin
- Erich Ponto as Geheimrat Wuellner
- Margarete Haagen as Witwe
- Harald Paulsen as Oberingenieur
- Richard Häussler as Ingenieur Partzke
- Eduard Wenck as Meister Hannemann
- Charlotte Schultz as Sekretärin
- Leni Herb as Lange Kollegin
- Hans Hermann Schaufuß as Herr vom Arbeitsamt
- Will Dohm as Dichter
- Gerhard Bienert as 1. Arbeiter
- Adolf Fischer as 2. Arbeiter
- Erich Dunskus as 3. Arbeiter
- Wilhelm P. Krüger as 4. Arbeiter
- Gunnar Möller as Boy
- Otto Matthies as Caféhauskellner
- Leopold von Ledebur as Werkspolizist
- Albert Venohr as 5. Arbeiter
- Alfred Karen as Werkzeichner
- Arthur Kühn as Büroangestellter
- Benno Mueller as Zeichner

== Bibliography ==
- Bock, Hans-Michael; Bergfelder, Tim, eds. (2009). The Concise Cinegraph: Encyclopaedia of German Cinema. New York: Berghahn Books. ISBN 978-1-57181-655-9.
