= The Wedding Trip (1939 film) =

1939 film

- Directed by: Karl Ritter
- Written by: Felix Lützkendorf; Karl Ritter
- Produced by: Karl Ritter
- Starring: Mathias Wieman; Angela Salloker; Françoise Rosay
- Cinematography: Günther Anders
- Edited by: Gottfried Ritter
- Music by: Theo Mackeben
- Production company: UFA
- Distributed by: UFA
- Release date: 4 April 1939
- Running time: 101 minutes
- Country: Germany
- Language: German

The Wedding Trip (German: Die Hochzeitsreise) is a 1939 German historical drama film directed by Karl Ritter and starring Mathias Wieman, Angela Salloker and Françoise Rosay. It was shot at the Babelsberg Studios in Potsdam. The film's sets were designed by the art director Walter Röhrig.

== Cast ==
- Mathias Wieman as Dr. Paul Goethals
- Angela Salloker as Grietje van Steelandt
- Françoise Rosay as Roosje van Steelandt
- Carsta Löck as Siska, Roosje's maid
- Elisabeth Wendt as Countess Amelie Zuurmondt
- Paul Dahlke as Jean Jacques Bouffart, Private Detective
- Ingolf Kuntze as Baron
- Margot Erbst as Jeanette, Dr Goethals' domestic servant
- Friedrich Honna as Old Doctor
- Leopold von Ledebur as Old Cavalier
- Otto Krone as Husband of Female Patient
- Alexander Engel as Second Guest, the 'Drinker'
- Lutz Götz as New Guest with Accordeon
- Alis Gronau as Female Patient
- Karl Harbacher as Countess's servant
- Bruno Hübner as First, Impatient Guest
- Friedel Müller as Dr. Goethals' domestic servant
- Ernst G. Schiffner as Third Guest, the Smoker

== Bibliography ==
- Bock, Hans-Michael & Töteberg, Michael . Das Ufa-Buch. Zweitausendeins, 1992.
- Klaus, Ulrich J. Deutsche Tonfilme: Jahrgang 1937. Klaus-Archiv, 1988.
- Kreimeier, Klaus. The Ufa Story: A History of Germany's Greatest Film Company, 1918-1945. University of California Press, 1999.
