= Dieter Dolezel =

German composer and guitarist

Dieter Dolezel (born 28 July 1977) is a German composer and electronic guitarist.

== Life ==
Dolezel was born in Munich. After initially studying philosophy at LMU Munich, he first studied guitar at the Richard-Strauss-Konservatorium München. This was followed by composition studies with Wilfried Hiller and Louis Andriessen as well as various master classes with Tristan Murail, Alvin Curran and Richard Ayres, among others. In 2002, he founded the doArte Foundation, for which he is still active in an advisory capacity.

Performances of his works have taken place at the Gaudeamus Foundation Music Week, the Hamburg Klangwerktage, novembermusic, at the Prinzregententheater in Munich and at the Auditorium Parco della Musica Santa Cecilia in Rome. Among the performers of his music are the Ensemble Modern, the King's Singers, Mike Svoboda, John Snijders, the Holland Symfonia, Fabrice Bollon, as well as the ensemble unitedberlin. In 2007, he was a scholarship holder at the Villa Massimo in Rome.

== Work ==
Orchestra

- aber vielleicht (2006)
- aber vielleicht for 20 strings (2004)

Chamber music

- realtime fragments for string quartet (2006)
- pLasTik for flute, bassoon, percussion (2), viola, cello and double bass (2005)
- fanfare 2003 for 4 trumpets, 4 trombones and percussion (2002), official fanfare for the 100th anniversary of the Deutsches Museum Munich.
- blacheriana I-III for saxophone quartet (2001/02)

Electroacoustics

- bugs for flute, double bass clarinet, piano, violin, viola, cello, double bass and electronics (2007/08)
- wildes FLEISCH II for trombone and soundtrack (2007)
- chasing dion tiu video installation (2007)
- hoax for three pianists, one piano and soundtrack (2005)
- babenberg for 5 electric guitars and electronics (2003)

Vocal

- serve bone et fidelis for 6-part choir a cappella (2008)
- may contain traces of for 4 voices and big band (2005)
- dogs and stones for 6 male voices (2004)

== Awards ==
- 2001 Richard Strauss-Scholarship of the City of Munich
- 2002 1st prize in the competition "Fanfare Deutsches Museum 2003"
- 2003/2004 Fellowship at "Internationales Künstlerhaus Villa Concordia" in Bamberg
- 2005 11th International Young Composers Meeting in Apeldoorn
- 2005 Musikstipendium by the city of Munich
- 2006 Sudetendeutscher Kulturförderpreis
- 2006 Prize winner at the 1st International Composition Competition of the Hamburger Klangwerktage
- 2007 1st prize in the competition Project Young Composers of the Holland Symfonia
- 2007 Gaudeamus Foundation audience prize
- 2007 Scholarship holder of the Villa Massimo in Rome
- 2009 Laureate at "Neue Töne" competition, Tonkünstlerverband
- 2013 Projektstipendium Junge Kunst / Neue Medien of the City of Munich.

== Recordings ==
- Otto von Bamberg, Schola Bamberg (2010), issued by Christophorus Records, (CHR77324)
- Edition Villa Massimo, Ensemble Modern (2008)
- Diario, Susanne Schoeppe, guitar (2004), issued by GENUIN, (GMP 04501)
- 9 Fanfaren, Blechbläserensemble des RSK, erschienen im Jubiläums-Bildband des Deutsches Museum Munich (2004)
