= Between Yesterday and Tomorrow (film) =

1947 film

- Directed by: Harald Braun
- Written by: Harald Braun; Jacob Geis; Herbert Witt
- Produced by: Walter Bolz
- Starring: Hildegard Knef; Winnie Markus; Sybille Schmitz; Willy Birgel
- Cinematography: Günther Anders
- Edited by: Adolf Schlyssleder
- Music by: Werner Eisbrenner
- Production company: Bavaria Film
- Distributed by: Schorcht Filmverleih
- Release date: 11 December 1947
- Running time: 107 minutes
- Country: Germany
- Language: German

Between Yesterday and Tomorrow (German: Zwischen gestern und morgen) is a 1947 German drama film directed by Harald Braun and starring Hildegard Knef, Winnie Markus and Sybille Schmitz. It was part of both the cycle of rubble films and subgenre of hotel films. As with many other German rubble films, it examines issues of collective guilt and future rebuilding.

It was shot at the Bavaria Studios in Munich. The film's sets were designed by the art director Robert Herlth.

== Plot ==
In post-war Germany a group of former guests return to a luxurious Munich hotel where they are haunted by memories of their past interaction with Nelly Dreifuss, a Jewish woman who died during the Nazi era.

== Cast ==
- Hildegard Knef as Das Mädchen Kat
- Winnie Markus as Annette Rodenwald
- Sybille Schmitz as Nelly Dreifuss
- Willy Birgel as Alexander Corty
- Viktor de Kowa as Michael Rott
- Viktor Staal as Rolf Ebeling
- Carsta Löck as Frau Gertie
- Adolf Gondrell as Dr. Weber
- Walther Kiaulehn as Intendant Kesser
- Erich Ponto as Professor von Walther
- Erhard Siedel as Herr Hummel
- Otto Wernicke as Ministerialdirektor Trunk

== Bibliography ==
- Bock, Hans-Michael; Bergfelder, Tim, eds. (2009). The Concise Cinegraph: Encyclopaedia of German Cinema. New York: Berghahn Books. ISBN 978-1-57181-655-9.
- Shandley, Robert R. (2001). Rubble Films: German Cinema in the Shadow of the Third Reich. Philadelphia: Temple University Press. ISBN 978-1-56639-878-7.
