= Harald Braun (director) =

German film director

- Born: 26 April 1901; Berlin, German Empire
- Died: 24 September 1960 (aged 59); Xanten, West Germany
- Occupations: Film director Screenwriter
- Years active: 1921–1973

Harald Braun (26 April 1901 – 24 September 1960) was a German film director, screenwriter and film producer. He directed 21 films between 1942 and 1960.

== Selected filmography ==
- The Roundabouts of Handsome Karl (dir. Carl Froelich, 1938, writer)
- The Way to Freedom (1941, writer)
- Love Me (dir. Harald Braun, 1942)
- Between Heaven and Earth (dir. Harald Braun, 1942)
- Nora (dir. Harald Braun, 1944)
- Dreaming (dir. Harald Braun, 1944)
- Between Yesterday and Tomorrow (dir. Harald Braun, 1947)
- The Lost Face (1948)
- Keepers of the Night (dir. Harald Braun, 1949)
- The Falling Star (dir. Harald Braun, 1950)
- The Man Who Wanted to Live Twice (dir. Victor Tourjansky, 1950)
- Fanfares of Love (dir. Kurt Hoffmann, 1951)
- No Greater Love (dir. Harald Braun, 1952)
- Father Needs a Wife (dir. Harald Braun, 1952)
- Fanfare of Marriage (dir. Hans Grimm, 1953)
- As Long as You're Near Me (dir. Harald Braun, 1953)
- Must We Get Divorced? (dir. Hans Schweikart, 1953)
- His Royal Highness (dir. Harald Braun, 1953)
- The Last Summer (dir. Harald Braun, 1954)
- The Last Man (dir. Harald Braun, 1955)
- Sky Without Stars (dir. Helmut Käutner, 1955)
- A Girl Without Boundaries (1955)
- Beloved Enemy (dir. Rolf Hansen, 1955)
- Reaching for the Stars (dir. Carl-Heinz Schroth, 1955)
- Regine (Two Worlds) (dir. Harald Braun, 1956)
- King in Shadow (dir. Harald Braun, 1957)
- The Glass Tower (dir. Harald Braun, 1957)
- The Buddenbrooks (dir. Alfred Weidenmann, 1959)
- The Ambassador (dir. Harald Braun, 1960)
