= Hilde Krahl =

Austrian actress (1917–1999)

- Born: Hildegard Kolačný; 10 January 1917; Brod na Savi, Kingdom of Croatia-Slavonia, Austria-Hungary
- Died: 28 June 1999 (aged 82); Vienna, Austria
- Occupation: Actress
- Years active: 1936–1994

Hilde Krahl (10 January 1917 – 28 June 1999) was an Austrian film actress. She appeared in 70 films between 1936 and 1994. She was born Hildegard Kolačný in Brod, Austria-Hungary (now Slavonski Brod, Croatia) in 1917, and she died in Vienna, Austria in 1999. In 1944 she married Wolfgang Liebeneiner; their daughter Johanna Liebeneiner also became a famous actress.

== Filmography ==
- The Fairy Doll (1936)
- Girls' Dormitory (1936)
- Lumpaci the Vagabond (1936)
- Serenade (1937)
- Gastspiel im Paradies (1938)
- The Jumping Jack (1938)
- The Merciful Lie (1939)
- Der Weg zu Isabel (1940)
- Donauschiffer (1940)
- Herz – modern möbliert (1940)
- Der Postmeister (1940)
- The Comedians (1941)
- Her Other Self (1941)
- Anuschka (1942)
- My Friend Josephine (1942)
- Melody of a Great City (1943)
- Dreaming (1944)
- Life Goes On (1945)
- Love '47 (1949)
- Law of Love (1949)
- My Niece Susanne (1950)
- Shadows in the Night (1950)
- When a Woman Loves (1950)
- White Shadows (1951)
- Gateway to Peace (1951)
- A Devil of a Woman (1951)
- No Greater Love (1952)
- 1. April 2000 (1952)
- The Venus of Tivoli (1953)
- The Mosquito (1954)
- The Eternal Waltz (1954)
- Marriage Impostor (1954)
- Children, Mother, and the General (1955)
- The Doctor's Secret (1955)
- One Woman Is Not Enough? (1955)
- Night of Decision (1956)
- My Father, the Actor (1956)
- A Glass of Water (1960)
- Terror After Midnight (1962)
- Heute kündigt mir mein Mann (1963)
- Derrick - Season 3, Episode 9: "Ein unbegreiflicher Typ" (1976, TV)
