= Angela Salloker =

Austrian actress

Angela Salloker (1913-2006) was an Austrian actress. She appeared in a number of 1930s films, notably in the title role in the 1935 film Joan of Arc. Following the Second World War she appeared largely in television.

In 1936 she played the major role of Charlotte Corday in a play about her assassination of Jean-Paul Marat at the Deutsches Theater in Berlin.

== Selected filmography ==
- The Black Whale (1934)
- The Secret of Cavelli (1934)
- Joan of Arc (1935)
- Girls' Dormitory (1936)
- The Broken Jug (1937)
- The Wedding Trip (1939)
- White Gold (1949)
- Mademoiselle de Scuderi (1976, TV film)

== Bibliography ==
- Fox, Jo. Filming women in the Third Reich. Berg, 2000.
- London, John. Theatre Under the Nazis. Manchester University Press, 2000.
