= Kirsten Boie =

German author of children's books

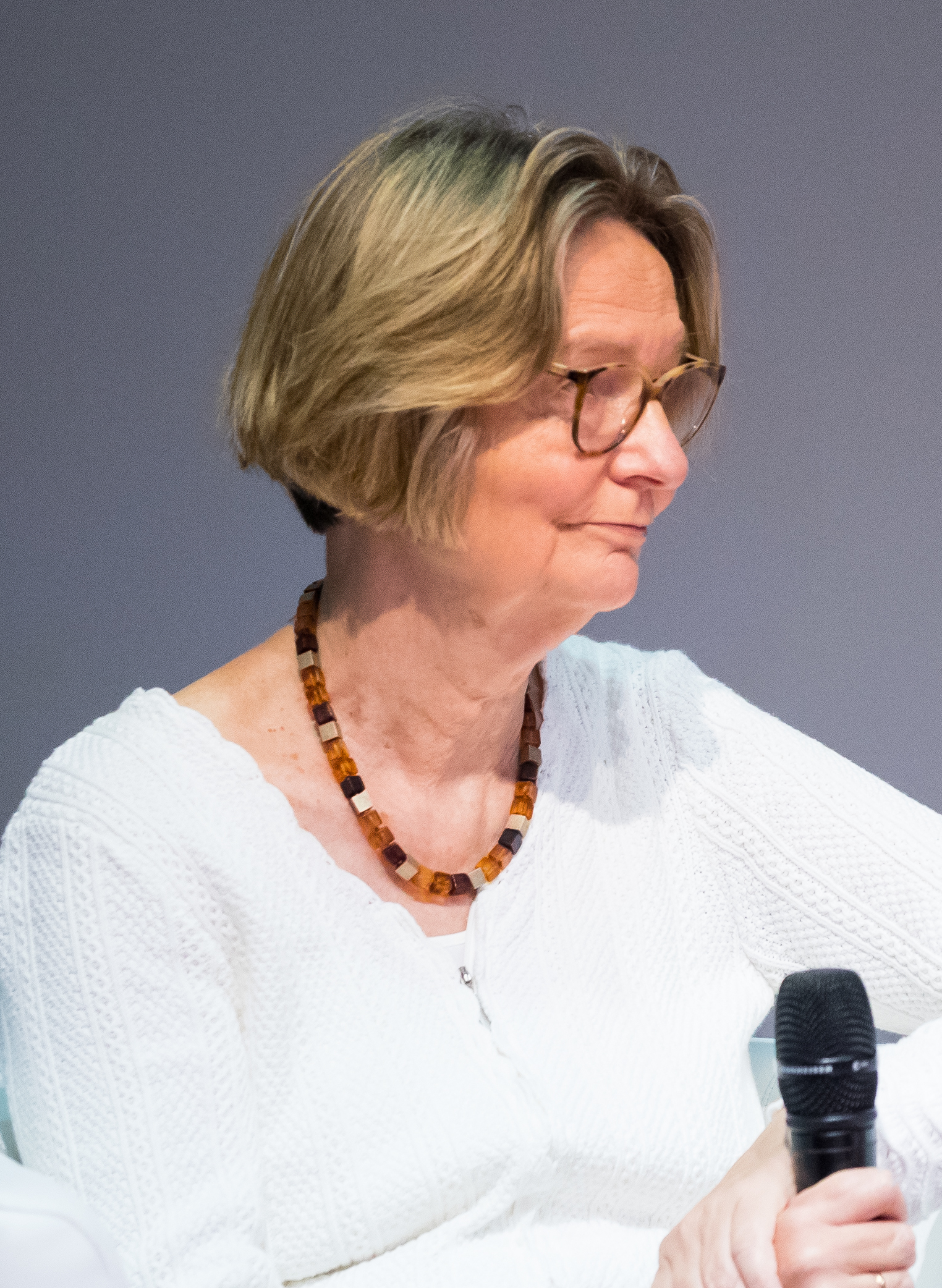
- Boie in 2018
- Born: 19 March 1950 (age 76) Hamburg, West Germany
- Education: University of Hamburg
- Genre: Children's literature
- Notable awards: Order of Merit of the Federal Republic of Germany (2008)

Kirsten Boie (German pronunciation: [ˈkɪrstn̩ ˈbɔɪ̯ə]; born 19 March 1950) is a German children's author and activist. Having worked as a teacher, she began publishing in 1985 and is the author of more than 100 books. Among her best-known works are Paule ist ein Glücksgriff, the Kinder aus dem Möwenweg series, and Ritter Trenk. She has been recognised with the Order of Merit of the Federal Republic of Germany and an honorary citizenship of Hamburg.

== Biography ==
Kirsten Boie was born in 1950 in Hamburg, Germany. Between 1969 and 1974, she read German and English literature at the University of Hamburg. She then worked as a teacher at a secondary school before starting her publishing career in 1985.

== Career ==
In 1985, Boie published her first children's novel, Paule ist ein Glücksgriff, about an ethnic-minority child adopted into a German family. She went on to publish more than 100 books in the genre. Her best-known works include Ritter Trenk (2006) and the Kinder aus dem Möwenweg series (from 2000).

Her contributions to the field of children's literature have been recognised on numerous occasions: among other awards, Boie received the Großer Preis der Deutschen Akademie für Kinder- und Jugendliteratur (2008) and the Order of Merit of the Federal Republic of Germany (2011). In December 2019, Boie was named an honorary citizen of her native Hamburg. In 2020, an award (Kirsten-Boie-Preis) for children's literature was named in her honour. Its inaugural recipient was the German author Julia Blesken.

== Activism ==
In 2018, Boie joined an initiative of German authors, Hamburger Erklärung, advocating for a greater emphasis on the acquisition of reading skills in primary school pupils. In reaction to the European migrant crisis of 2015, she published Everything Will Be Alright about a child fleeing the Syrian city of Homs. Boie said that the book was intended to raise awareness for the situation of Syrian refugee children in German schools, and it is published in both German and Arabic. During the COVID-19 pandemic she participated in a campaign by the newspaper Hamburger Abendblatt that encouraged children to read books while in lockdown.

== Books in English ==
- Linnea finds an orphan dog (for learning English as a foreign language)
- The Princess Plot
- The Princess Trap
- No Escape From the Alhambra
