= Mathias Wieman =

German actor

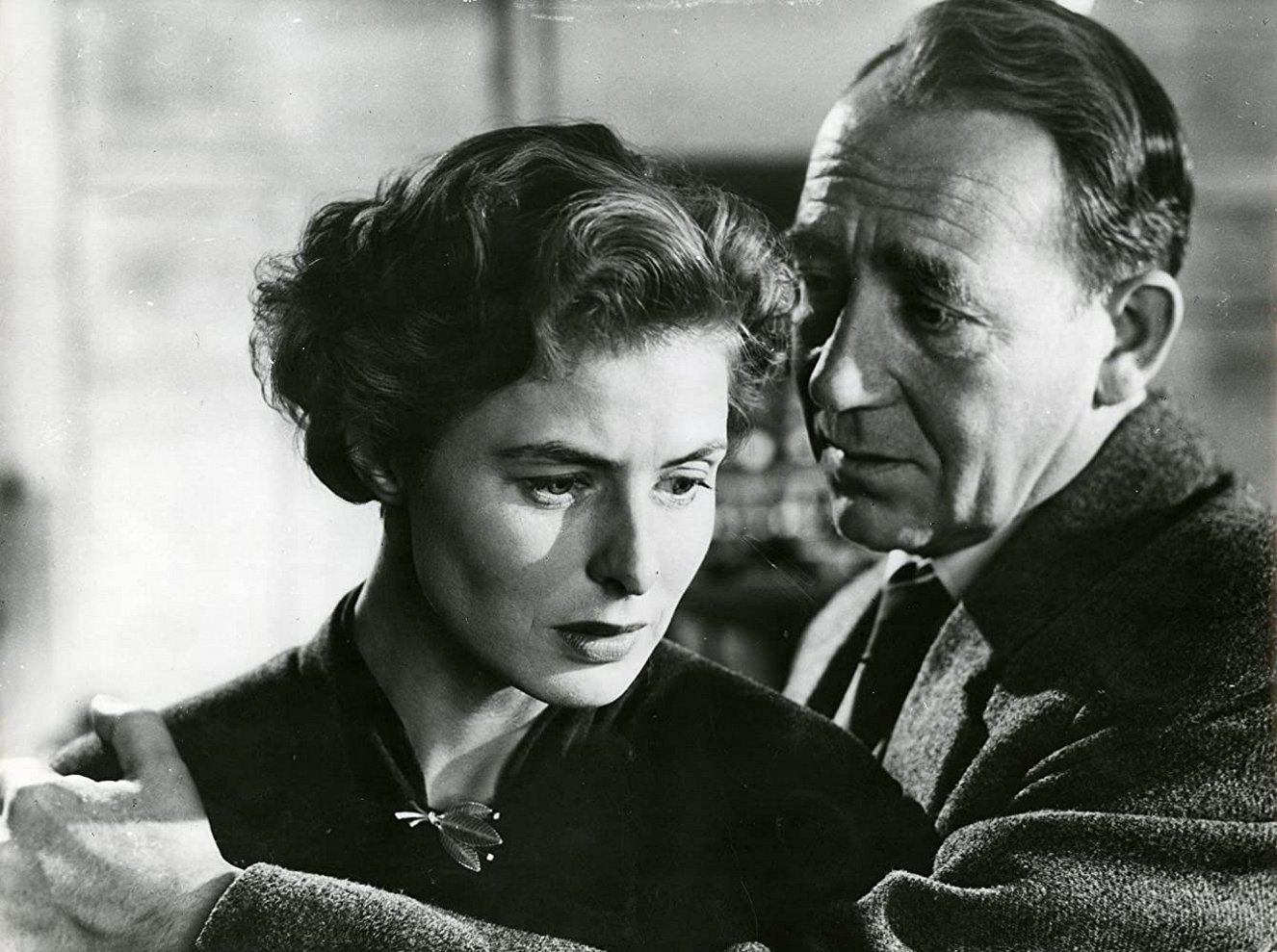
- Wieman with Ingrid Bergman in Fear (1954)
- Born: 23 June 1902; Osnabrück, German Empire
- Died: 3 December 1969 (aged 67); Zurich, Switzerland

Mathias Wieman (née Carl Heinrich Franz Mathias Wieman; 23 June 1902 – 3 December 1969) was a German stage-performer, silent-and-sound motion picture actor.

== Life and career ==
=== Early life ===
Wieman was born in Osnabrück, the only son of Carl Philipp Anton Wieman and his wife Louise. Raised in Osnabrück, Wiesbaden and Berlin, where he studied four terms of philosophy, history of art and languages, Wieman wanted to actually become an airplane technical designer and flier. He started his acting career on the stage in Berlin under the direction of Max Reinhardt at the Deutsches Theater. In the early 1920s, he was a member of the Holtorf-Truppe, a stock theater group that included future director Veit Harlan. His fellow stage actors included his future wife, Erika Meingast, Marlene Dietrich, Dora Gerson and Max Schreck (the vampire in Nosferatu). Later he began working in silent and sound films; he landed supporting roles in Assassination, Queen Louise and Land Without Women. In 1930, along with Leni Riefenstahl, he appeared in Storm over Mont Blanc, and in 1932 he played the lead in Riefenstahl's The Blue Light.

At the height of his film career, during the decade of the 1930s, Wieman acted in such productions as Man Without a Name, L'Atlantide, The Countess of Monte Cristo, Fräulein Hoffmanns Erzählungen, The Rider on the White Horse, Victoria, Patriots, and Togger.

In 1936 Wieman produced the Frankenburger Würfelspiel of the Nazi playwright Eberhard Wolfgang Möller in association with the 1936 Summer Olympics and the inauguration of the Dietrich-Eckart-Bühne, and also played the Black Knight.

He also had an international success with his appearance in The Eternal Mask. The movie was awarded with the American National Board of Review Award for Best Foreign Film in the United States in 1937 (National Board of Review Awards 1937). The film was also nominated for an award at the Venice Film Festival. Also in 1937, Wieman was made Staatsschauspieler, an honorary title bestowed by the German government and the highest honour attainable by an actor in Germany.

=== 1940s and after ===
Wieman was classed as "persona non grata" by Joseph Goebbels, this greatly reduced his activity. He acted in the following movies in the 1940s: Ich klage an, Her Other Self, Paracelsus, Dreaming and How Do We Tell Our Children?. After the failed 20 July plot to assassinate Adolf Hitler happened in 1944, Mathias and his wife Erika helped the family of Count Fritz-Dietlof von der Schulenburg. This assistance is detailed by Charlotte von der Schulenburg in the book Courageous Hearts: Women and the Anti-Hitler Plot of 1944 (Dorothee Von Meding, Berghahn Books, 1997).

After World War II he was able to work more intensively in the film business again, normally in support roles. To his fairly well known work belongs No Greater Love, As Long as You're Near Me, The Last Summer, Ripening Youth, The Girl and the Legend, and opposite Ingrid Bergman in Roberto Rossellini's Fear. Two of the films Mathias starred in were in competition at the Cannes Film Festival: In 1952, No Greater Love; and in 1954, As Long as You're Near Me.

Wieman also made many records (LPs) of classic stories where he would narrate the story accompanied by orchestral music. One example is Peter und der Wolf with Mathias and the Berlin Philharmonic in 1950 conducted by Fritz Lehmann and the Orchestre National de France in 1962 conducted by Lorin Maazel. Another example is Mathias Wiemans kleine Diskothek. In 1992 Deutsche Grammophon issued a commemorative set of CDs in honour of the 100th anniversary of Wieman's birth: Für Kenner & Kinder.

=== Stage work ===
Condolence Telegram from German President Gustav Heinemann on death of Mathias in 1969

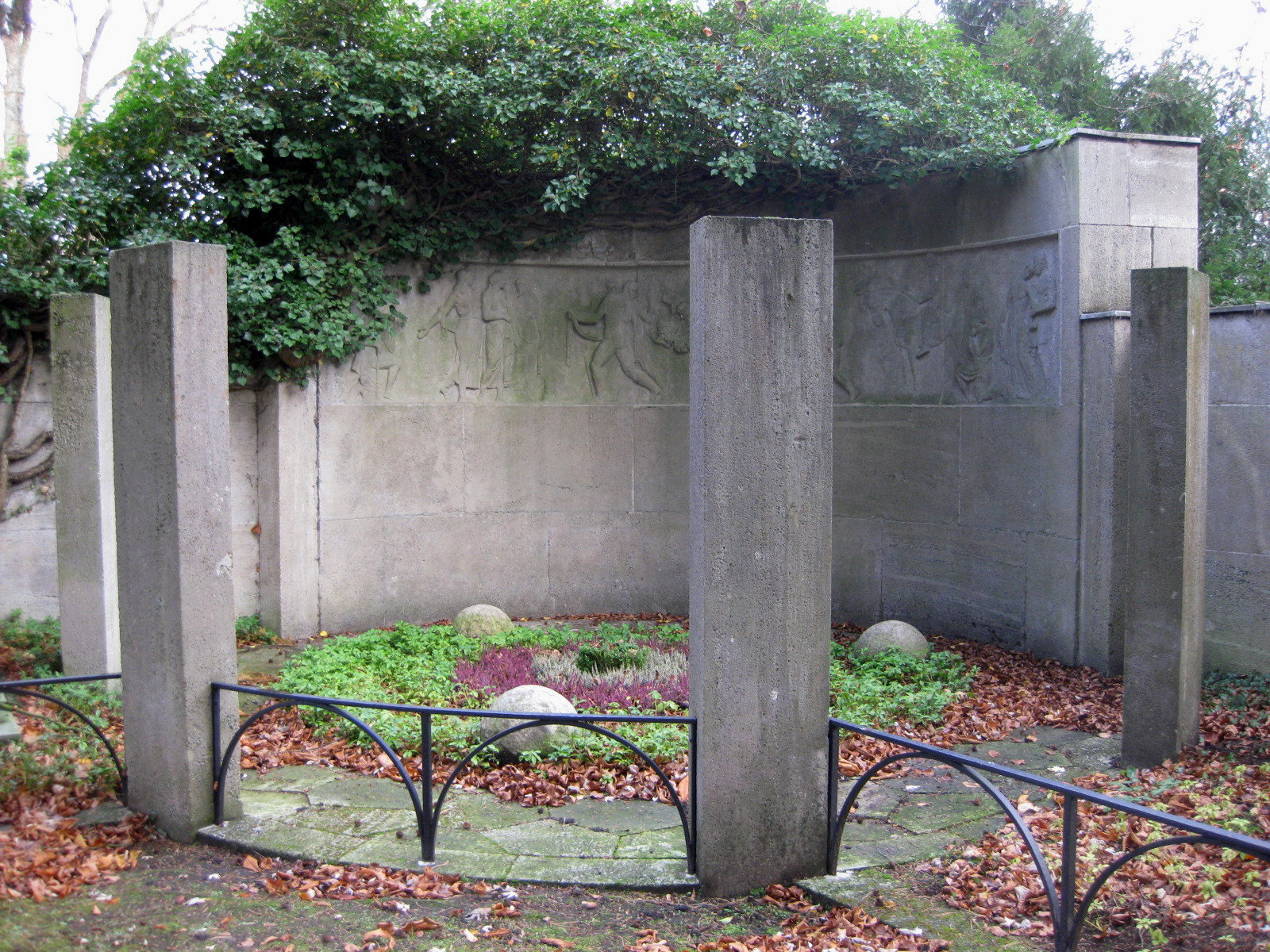
Wieman grave, Osnabrück

On stage, Wieman appeared in a number of productions including, Goethe's Faust, Pygmalion (play) by George Bernard Shaw, the most famous play of Italian playwright Luigi Pirandello, Six Characters in Search of an Author, and in Bertolt Brecht's In The Jungle of Cities (Im Dickicht der Städte).

His many friends included such diverse people as Hanna Reitsch, Lida Baarova, Hans Fallada, Anny Ondra, and Fritz-Dietlof von der Schulenburg.

=== Later life ===
After World War II, Wieman moved to Switzerland with his wife, stage actress Erika Meingast, there in 1969 he died of cancer. Mathias and his wife Erika (died in 1972) were cremated and the ashes buried in the Wieman family plot in the Johannesfriedhof cemetery in Osnabrück.

== Honours ==
In 1958, his hometown of Osnabrück awarded him the prestigious Justus-Möser-Medaille for his achievements in acting on stage and screen. And in 1965, Wieman received the Bambi Award.

== Selected filmography ==
- A Free People (1925)
- Potsdam (1927)
- Out of the Mist (1927) as Dr. Friedlieb
- Mata Hari (1927) as Grigori
- Queen Louise (1927) as King Frederick William III
- Assassination (1927) as Irrsinniger
- The Merry Farmer (1927) as son Stephan Reuther
- The Runaway Girl (1928) as Vladimir Pekoff, ein Komponist
- Under the Lantern (1928) as Hans Grote
- Diary of a Coquette (1929) as Arzt
- Land Without Women (1929) as American Physician
- Love's Carnival (1930) as Hans Rudorff - Leutnant
- Storm over Mont Blanc (1930) as Walter Petersen
- The Golden Anchor (1932) as Marcus sein Sohn
- The Blue Light (1932) as Vigo
- The Countess of Monte Cristo (1932) as Stephan Riehl, Journalist
- L'Atlantide (1932) as Ivar Torstenson
- Man Without a Name (1932) as Dr. Alfred Sander
- Anna and Elizabeth (1933) as Mathias Testa
- Fräulein Hoffmanns Erzählungen (1933) as Benno Karden
- The Love Hotel (1933) as Klaus Petermann
- The Rider on the White Horse (1934) as Hauke Haien
- Achtung! Wer kennt diese Frau? (1934) as Artur von Bavro
- The Lost Valley (1934) as René von Eisten
- Little Dorrit (1934) as Arthur Clennam
- Suburban Cabaret (1935) as Josef Kernthaler, Bauzeichner
- The Eternal Mask (1935) as Dr. Dumartin
- Victoria (1935) as Johannes
- Togger (1937) as Peter Geis, Journalist
- Patriots (1937) as Peter Thomann - genannt Pierre
- Unternehmen Michael (1937) as Major Zur Linden
- Michelangelo: Life of a Titan (1938) (voice)
- Anna Favetti (1938) as Hemmstreet
- The Wedding Trip (1939) as Dr. Paul Goethals
- Cadets (1939) as Rittmeister von Tzülow
- Ich klage an (1941) as Dr. Bernhard Lang
- Her Other Self (1941) as Ingenieur Martin
- Paracelsus (1943) as Ulrich von Hutten
- Don't Talk to Me About Love (1943) as Andreas Alwin
- Dreaming (1944) as Robert Schumann
- The Heart Must Be Silent (1944) as Dr. Paul Holzgruber
- How Do We Tell Our Children? (1949) as Dr. Thomas Hofer
- When a Woman Loves (1950) as Felder, Kunsthändler
- Melody of Fate (1950), as Martin Ehrling
- No Greater Love (1952) as Alfred Nobel
- As Long as You're Near Me (1953) as Paul, der Autor
- His Royal Highness (1953) as Dr. Raoul Überbein
- A Love Story (1954) as Fritz v. Fredersdorff, Gutsbesitzer
- The Last Summer (1954) as President Carlo Tolemainen
- Fear (1954) as Professor Albert Wagner
- Ripening Youth (1955) as Obersdtudiendirektor Dr. Berger
- If All the Guys in the World (1956) as Karl Baumeister
- The Marriage of Doctor Danwitz (1956) as Professor Schüddekopf
- The Girl and the Legend (1957) as King Georg II
- Wetterleuchten um Maria (1957) as Priest
- Der Sittlichkeitsverbrecher (1963) as Richter
- Erotikon (1963)
- Geld und Geist (1966) as Pfarrer (final film role)
