= Girls' Dormitory (1936 Austrian film) =

1936 film directed by Géza von Bolváry

- Directed by: Géza von Bolváry
- Written by: Ralph Benatzky; Rudolf Brettschneider
- Produced by: Fritz Schanz
- Starring: Raoul Aslan; Angela Salloker; Erika von Thellmann
- Cinematography: István Eiben
- Edited by: Hermann Haller
- Music by: Frank Fox; Ralph Benatzky
- Production company: Styria-Film
- Distributed by: Kiba Kinobetriebsanstalt
- Release date: 29 August 1936
- Running time: 94 minutes
- Country: Austria
- Language: German

Girls' Dormitory (German: Mädchenpensionat) is a 1936 Austrian drama film directed by Géza von Bolváry and starring Raoul Aslan, Angela Salloker and Erika von Thellmann. The film's sets were designed by the art director Márton Vincze.

== Cast ==
- Raoul Aslan as Der König
- Angela Salloker as Prinzessin Dagmar
- Erika von Thellmann as Prinzessin Alexa
- Attila Hörbiger as Dr. Rupli
- Hilde Krahl as Gertrud
- Ferdinand Mayerhofer as Professor Grotrian
- Olga Limburg as Madame Godard
- Leopoldine Konstantin as Fräulein Leers
- Lilia Skala as Fräulein Hell
- Ilka Thimm as Miß Parker
- Liesl Karlstadt as Elisabeth
- Norbert Roringer as Peterchen

== Bibliography ==
- Bock, Hans-Michael & Bergfelder, Tim. The Concise CineGraph. Encyclopedia of German Cinema. Berghahn Books, 2009.
- Von Dassanowsky, Robert. Screening Transcendence: Film Under Austrofascism and the Hollywood Hope, 1933-1938. Indiana University Press, 2018
- Waldman, Harry. Nazi Films in America, 1933–1942. McFarland, 2008.
