= No Greater Love (1952 film) =

1952 film

- Film poster
- Directed by: Harald Braun
- Written by: Harald Braun; Herbert Witt
- Produced by: Harald Braun; Georg Richter
- Starring: Hilde Krahl
- Cinematography: Richard Angst
- Edited by: Claus von Boro
- Production company: Neue Deutsche Filmgesellschaft
- Distributed by: Schorcht Filmverleih; Sascha Film (Austria)
- Release date: 29 February 1952
- Running time: 113 minutes
- Country: West Germany
- Language: German

No Greater Love or Heart of the World (German: Herz der Welt) is a 1952 West German historical drama film directed by Harald Braun. It was entered into the 1952 Cannes Film Festival. It was shot at the Bavaria Studios in Munich and on location in Berlin. The film's sets were designed by the art directors Hermann Warm and Robert Herlth.

== Cast ==
- Hilde Krahl as Bertha von Suttner
- Dieter Borsche as Arthur von Suttner
- Werner Hinz as Basil Zaharoff
- Mathias Wieman as Dr. Alfred Nobel
- Käthe Haack as Baronin von Suttner
- Dorothea Wieck as Therese von Gobat
- Therese Giehse as Female train passenger
- Paul Bildt as Fehrenbach
- Heinrich Gretler as Graf Fürstenberg
- Paul Henckels as Professor Gutgesell
- Erich Ponto as Minister
- Alfred Neugebauer as Baron von Suttner
- Wolfgang Liebeneiner as Chef editor

== See also ==
- Notable film portrayals of Nobel laureates
