= Der Goggolori =

Der Goggolori is a children's opera in eight scenes and an epilogue by Wilfried Hiller to a German libretto by Michael Ende. The work was dedicated to Carl Orff; it was first performed on 3 February 1985 at the Staatstheater am Gärtnerplatz in Munich.

It is based on Bavarian folk tale about conflict between Paganism and Christianity, set at the time of the Thirty Years' War.

== Roles ==
- The Goggolori (tenor)
- Zeipoth, a farm girl (soprano)
- Irwing, her father, weaver and farmer (bass)
- Weberin (weaver), her mother (contralto)
- Aberwin, a young musician and charcoal burner (bass)
- The Hermit (spoken)
- Ullerin, healer, barber and witch (bass with high falsetto)
- Der Goggolori in another shape (spoken)
- Puppeteers, farmers
