= As Long as You're Near Me =

1953 film

- Film poster
- Directed by: Harald Braun
- Written by: Jochen Huth
- Produced by: Harald Braun; Georg Richter; Ferdinand von Kerssenbrock
- Starring: Maria Schell; O.W. Fischer; Hardy Krüger
- Cinematography: Helmut Ashley
- Edited by: Claus von Boro
- Music by: Werner Eisbrenner
- Production company: N.D.F.-Produktion
- Distributed by: Schorcht Film
- Release date: 27 August 1953
- Running time: 103 minutes
- Country: West Germany
- Language: German

As Long as You're Near Me (German: Solange Du da bist) is a 1953 West German drama film directed by Harald Braun and starring Maria Schell and O.W. Fischer and Hardy Krüger. It was shot at the Bavaria Studios in Munich. The film's sets were designed by the art director Walter Haag. It was entered into the 1954 Cannes Film Festival.

== Cast ==
- Brigitte Horney as Mona Arendt
- O.W. Fischer as Frank Tornau
- Maria Schell as Eva Berger
- Walter Richter as Willi
- Liesl Karlstadt as L'habilleuse
- Mathias Wieman as Paul
- Hardy Krüger as Stefan Berger
- Paul Bildt as Bentz
- Heini Göbel
- Hans Henn
- Michael Lenz
- Wolfgang Molander
- Gudrun Rabente
- Rudolf Vogel

== Bibliography ==
- Bock, Hans-Michael & Bergfelder, Tim. The Concise Cinegraph: Encyclopaedia of German Cinema. Berghahn Books, 2009.
