= Ali Ghito =

German actress

- Born: Adelheid Schnabel-Fürbringer; 11 January 1905; Zeulsdorf (Gera), German Empire
- Died: 29 April 1983 (aged 78); Taos, New Mexico, United States
- Other names: Adelheid Schlag; Adelheid Schmidt-Branden; Adelheid Habe
- Occupation: Actress
- Years active: 1932–1947 (film)

Ali Ghito (born Adelheid Schnabel-Fürbringer; 11 January 1905 – 29 April 1983) was a German stage and film actress.

== Selected filmography ==
- Cavaliers of the Kurfürstendamm (1932)
- Eight Girls in a Boat (1932)
- A Man with Heart (1932)
- Ways to a Good Marriage (1933)
- The Rider on the White Horse (1934)
- The Champion of Pontresina (1934)
- Kitty and the World Conference (1939)
- Carl Peters (1941)
- Jakko (1941)
- Quax in Africa (1947)

== Bibliography ==
- Goble, Alan. The Complete Index to Literary Sources in Film. Walter de Gruyter, 1999.
