= Nélida Béjar =

Spanish composer (born 1979)

Nélida Béjar (born 1979 in Munich) is a Spanish composer based in Germany. She studied Music at the Hochschule für Musik und Theater München and Composition with Wilfried Hiller at Richard Strauss Conservatory in Munich. In 2012 she received a PhD in Composition at Trinity College, Dublin, where she studied with Donnacha Dennehy.

In 2009, she founded the undercoverfiction ensemble for contemporary music and music theater in Munich, along with theater director Björn Potulski. In this team, she has created opera productions in the spirit of community theatre, working with companies that are linked to the theme of the respective project: "Schwerer als Luft" (2010) in cooperation with Munich Airport, where the singers on stage were aircraft handlers; "This New Ocean" (2013) in cooperation with various airlines, where the singers are crew members of the airlines. Béjar teaches Music and Media at the Hochschule für Musik und Theater München.

== Selected works ==
Orchestra

- Kilter for large orchestra (2007)

Ensemble

- Nachtschattenklänge for two pianos and percussion (2002)
- Cortaziana für baritone und 14 instruments (2005)
- In der Sonne trage schwarz for wind octett and double bass (2008)

Stage music

- Creation, for piano and electronics (2007)
- Exodus, for live processed violin (2008)

Music theatre and opera

- Toward Perpetual Peace, for ensemble and live electronics (2010)
- Schwerer als Luft, choreographic opera for mixed ensemble and a choir of aircraft handlers (2012)
- This New Ocean, opera for mixed ensemble, soprano, alto, countertenor, tenor, bass and mixed choir (2014)
- The City, music theatre for soprano, mixed choir, synthesizer and drum set (2016)

== Awards ==
- 2004 Fellowship of the State of Bavaria at the Cité internationale des arts in Paris
- 2005 Richard Strauss Prize of the City of Munich
- 2007-2008 Residence at the Internationales Künstlerhaus Villa Concordia in Bamberg
- 2011 Music award of the City of Munich

== Discography ==
- „Punkt 11“ neue und neuere Musik (Werke von Edlund, Béjar, Xenakis, Hosokawa, Rihm, Ishii, Gourzi, Trüstedt/Schäffer), Hochschule für Musik und Theater München / Bayerischer Rundfunk, 2003
- Singphonic Christmas, Die Singphoniker (2005)
- 9 Fanfaren, brass ensemble of RSK, published for the anniversary of the Deutsches Museum of Munich (2004)
