= Herbert Holzing =

German artist and book illustrator

Herbert Holzing (1931-2000) was an artist and book illustrator.

Herbert Holzing has illustrated over 85 books and 120 bookcovers in his career. He especially gained fame because of his coverillustrations for Krabat by Otfried Preußler and Die Glocke vom grünen Erz. His work gained wide appreciation in the international press.
