= Rudolf Herfurtner =

German writer (born 1947)

Rudolf Herfurtner (born 19 October 1947) is a German writer.

== Life ==
Born in Wasserburg am Inn, Herfurtner graduated from the Luitpold-Oberrealschule in Wasserburg. After the death of his parents in 1965, he moved to Munich. There he studied German Studies, English Studies and Theatre Studies from 1968 and graduated in 1975 with a Magister Artium.

While still a student, Herfurtner contributed texts to the feuilleton of a Munich daily newspaper and began a volontariat at the television division of Bayerischer Rundfunk. In 1973, the Ravensburger Herfurtner's first book Hinter dem Paradies.

Herfurtner writes mainly youth literature (short stories, youth novels, plays, radio plays and contributions for television).

== Awards ==
- 1981 Förderpreis der Stadt München
- 1985 Hans-im-Glück-Preis for Das Ende der Pflaumenbäume
- 1990 Preis der Leseratten for Mensch Karnickel
- 1993 Deutscher Kinderhörspielpreis for Motzarella und die Weihnachtswölfe
- 1994 „Moritz“, Preis der 9. Werkstatttage, Halle for Der Nibeljunge
- 1996 Deutscher Kindertheater-Preis for Waldkinder
- 2000 Preis der Bayerische Theatertage for Spatz Fritz
- 2001 La vache qui lit
- 2001 Hansjörg-Martin-Preis of the "Autorengruppe deutschsprachige Kriminalliteratur" – Das Syndikat for Milo und die Jagd nach dem grünhaarigen Mädchen
- 2002 Großer Preis der Deutschen Akademie für Kinder- und Jugendliteratur e.V. Volkach
- 2005 LesePeter März for Tims wundersame Sternenreise
- 2012 Goldener Spatz for the best script Tom und Hacke

== Work ==
- Brennende Gitarre. Ist Jimi Hendrix wirklich tot?, novel, 1980
- Hard Rock, novel, 1981
- Simon Frasers lange Reise zum Pazifik, novel, 1981
- Hinter dem Paradies, 1983
- Käpt’n Erwin segelt zur Schokoladeninsel, 1984
- Rita, Rita, tales, 1984
- Der liebste Malte aller Zeiten, 1985
- Das Ende der Pflaumenbäume? Eine Novelle, 1985
- Der Wald unterm Dach, 1985
- Regula radelt rum. Ein Bilderbuch (pictures by Michael Keller), 1986
- Das Taubenmädchen, 1987
- Hurra, wir ziehen um (illustrated by Stephen Cartwright), 1987
- Wir sind im Kindergarten (illustrated by Stephen Cartwright), 1987
- Hurra, wir feiern ein Kinderfest (illustrated by Stephen Cartwright), 1987
- Wir bekommen ein Baby (illustrated by Stephen Cartwright), 1987
- Wir gehen zum Zahnarzt (illustrated by Stephen Cartwright), 1987
- Wir gehen ins Krankenhaus (illustrated by Stephen Cartwright), 1987
- Rosalinds Elefant und Rudi Rudi Wolldecke (illustrated by Reinhard Michl), 1988
- Gloria von Jaxtberg oder die Prinzessin vom Pfandlhof (pictures by Reinhard Michl), 1988
- Das Christkind fliegt ums Haus, 1988
- Brausepulver. Geschichten aus den 50er Jahren, 1989
- Mensch Karnickel, 1990
- Wunderjahre. Hannas Geschichte, 1991
- Der Nibeljunge, Theaterstück, 1992
- Motzarella und die Weihnachtswölfe (pictures by Werner Blaebst), 1992
- Papa, du sollst kommen (pictures by Reinhard Michl), 1992
- Motzarella und der Geburtstagsdrache (pictures by Werner Blaebst), 1993
- Lieber Nichtsnutz, 1993
- Kleiner Kater – große Welt, 1995
- Liebe Grüße, Dein Coco, 1995
- Muschelkind, 1995
- Robert fährt im Bus zur Schule, 1997
- Träne und Meikk. Mit wilden Schwänen durch die Nacht, 1997
- Gumpert Blubb (pictures by Reinhard Michl), 1997
- Waldkinder (pictures by Antoni Boratyński), 1997
- Der wasserdichte Willibald (illustrated by Barbara Schumann), 1997
- Niki und der kleine Hund (pictures by Eva Czerwenka), 1998
- Niki wird gerettet. Eine Hundegeschichte (pictures by Eva Czerwenka), 1998
- Donnerwetter, Robert!, 1998
- Joseph und seine Schwester. Ein Stück aus der Bibel in 3 Akten, 1998
- Milo und die Jagd nach dem grünhaarigen Mädchen, 2000
- Rosa (pictures by Reinhard Michl), 2001
- Zanki Fransenohr. Eine Katzengeschichte aus Griechenland, Kinderstück, 2001
- Schläft ein Lied in allen Dingen. Musikerzählungen, 2002
- Tims wundersame Sternenreise (pictures by Julian Jusim), 2004
- Das Geheimnis von Burg Wolfenstein, 2004
- Ohne Musik ist alles nichts, 2011
- Das Geschenk des weißen Pferdes, 2011
- Magdalena Himmelstürmerin, 2013

== Filmography (script) ==
- 1985: Rita Rita
- 1989: Rosalinds Elefant
- 1991: Wunderjahre
- 2007: Toni Goldwascher
- 2011: Der Eisenhans
- 2012: Tom und Hacke

== Radio plays ==
- 2009: Orphea und der Klangzauberer – director: Leonhard Huber (children radio play, 2 parts – Aktive Musik Verlagsgesellschaft/BR)
