= The Falling Star =

1950 film

- Directed by: Harald Braun
- Written by: Harald Braun; Herbert Witt
- Produced by: Jacob Geis
- Starring: Werner Krauss; Dieter Borsche; Gisela Uhlen
- Cinematography: Richard Angst
- Edited by: Claus von Boro
- Music by: Werner Eisbrenner
- Production company: Neue Deutsche Filmgesellschaft
- Distributed by: National-Film
- Release date: 19 December 1950
- Running time: 108 minutes
- Country: West Germany
- Language: German

The Falling Star (German: Der fallende Stern) is a 1950 West German drama film directed by Harald Braun and starring Werner Krauss, Dieter Borsche and Gisela Uhlen. It was entered into the 1951 Cannes Film Festival. It was shot at the Bavaria Studios in Munich. The film's sets were designed by the art directors Hans Sohnle and Fritz Lück.

== Cast ==
- Werner Krauss as Lenura / Lenoir
- Dieter Borsche as Lucius / Luciano
- Gisela Uhlen as Lore Hollreiser
- Paul Dahlke as Viktor Hollreiser
- Angelika Meissner as Elisabeth Hollreiser (10 Jahre)
- Maria Wimmer as Elisabeth Hollreiser (erwachsen)
- Elfriede Kuzmany as Alma Waurich
- Renate Mannhardt as Trude
- Elisabeth Lindermeier as Sängerin
- Anna Lange as Alwine
- Lisa Helwig as Alte
- Theodolinde Müller as Frau Luschnat
- Gudrun Rabente as Inge
- Eva Vaitl as Heilsarmee-Offizierin
- Kurt Stieler as Vitus Aschenbach

== Bibliography ==
- Bock, Hans-Michael & Bergfelder, Tim. The Concise CineGraph. Encyclopedia of German Cinema. Berghahn Books, 2009.
