= Blue Room =

Blue Room may refer to:

== Music ==
- "Blue Room", 1926 song written by Richard Rodgers and Lorenz Hart
- Blue Room, band that performed "Everytime You Go Away" at the end of the 1987 film Planes, Trains and Automobiles
- "Blue Room", 1992 single by The Orb
- Blue Room (Unwritten Law album) (1994)
- Blue Room Released, UK independent record label, operating from 1994 to 2002
- Blue Room (Ana & Milton Popović album) (2015)

== Other uses ==
- Blue Room (White House), parlor room in the White House, Washington, D.C.
- "Blue's Room", segment of the children's TV show Blue's Clues
- Blue room, part of the Pepper's Ghost illusion
- Blue Room (Windsor Castle), room at the Windsor Castle, also known as the Albert Room.

== See also ==
- Blue Chamber, the chamber of the National Assembly of Quebec
- The Blue Room (disambiguation)
- Blue hall (disambiguation)
