= The Blue Room =

The Blue Room may refer to:

== Music ==
- The Blue Room (EP), 1999 EP by Coldplay
- "Blue Room" (The Orb song), 1992 single by The Orb
- The Blue Room (Madeleine Peyroux album), 2013
- The Blue Room, 2000 album by Union
- The Blue Room (soundtrack), 2010 soundtrack album from Arthur Loves Plastic
- The Blue Room, UK music show on BBC Radio 1
- The Blue Room, Kansas City jazz venue in the 18th and Vine District
- The Blue Room, restaurant in the Del Morocco music venue (1935-67), in Nashville, Tennessee, US

== Other uses ==
- The Blue Room (play), 1998 play by David Hare
- The Blue Room (2002 film), Mexican-Spanish film
- The Blue Room (2014 film), French film
- The Blue Room (Picasso), 1901 painting by Pablo Picasso
- The Blue Room (Valadon), 1923 painting by Suzanne Valadon
- The Blue Room (La chambre bleue), 1964 mystery novel by Georges Simenon
- The Blue Room, art venue for homosexuals in Singapore
- The Blue Room, airport lounge of Virgin Blue (now Virgin Australia)

== See also ==
- Blue Room (disambiguation)
