= The Line (play) =

British play

- Original language: English
- Written by: Timberlake Wertenbaker
- Characters: Edgar Degas; Suzanne Valadon; Zoé Clozier (Degas's housekeeper)
- Genre: drama

Premiere
- Place: Arcola Theatre

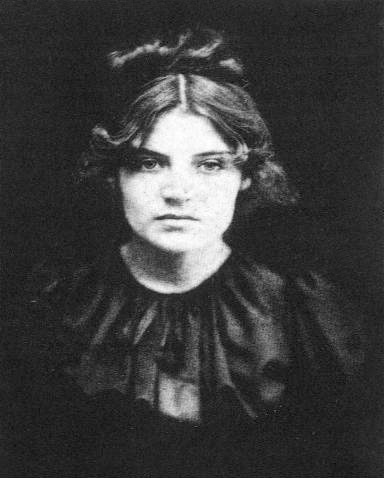
Suzanne Valadon, "in many ways, the opposite of Degas, being undisciplined and sexually promiscuous, but the two are united in a devotion to drawing."

The Line is a 2009 play by British dramatist Timberlake Wertenbaker about the relationship between Edgar Degas and Suzanne Valadon. Set in " the intimate, if quarrelsome world of Montmartre", at the play's heart are "a leading artist, a protegee and a clash between traditions, lifestyles and eras." The 2009 London production of the play starred Henry Goodman as Degas and Sarah Smart as Valadon.

Wertenbaker has stated that she began with Valadon because someone had given her a biography which she found fascinating. In the biography she came across Degas and the relationship between the two intrigued Wertenbaker.

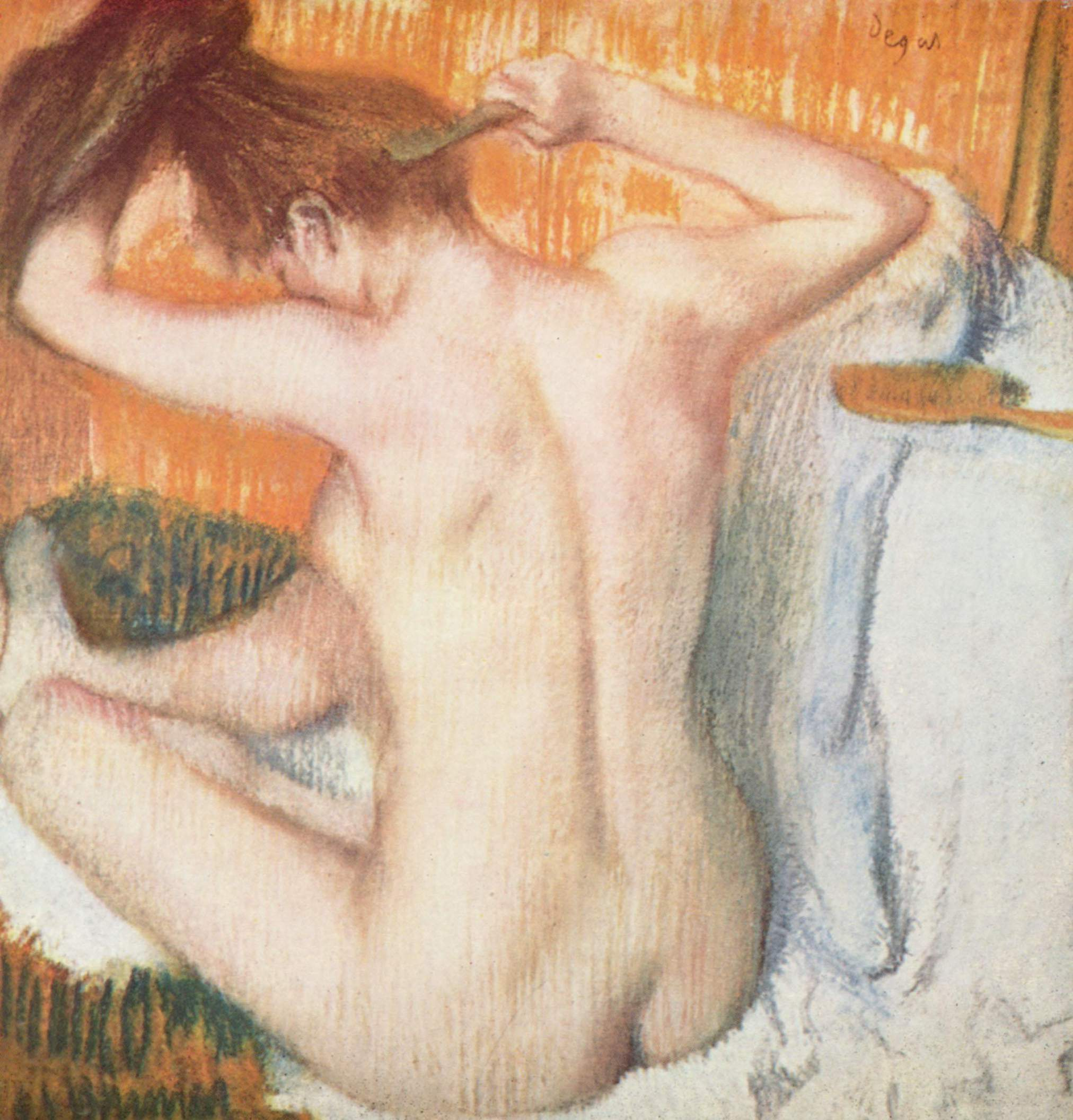
Edgar Degas, "a crotchety, acclaimed artist. Those sensual drawings of young women bathing and dancing turn out to be the product of a rather curmudgeonly and celibate character in his own life".

Valadon called Degas the Master, but Wertenbaker believes he also learned from her:

He loved her drawings and he did imitate them...I think he may also have learned other things from her; that there was another way of living, that there was another way of being that was very attractive. It's hard to imagine that he spent as much time as he did with her and spoke of her so warmly and wanted to see her so much if he didn't get something from her because Degas was somebody who was very curious and didn't suffer fools gladly.
