= Nude Woman with a Blue Shawl =

1930 painting by Suzanne Valadon

- French: Nu au châle bleu
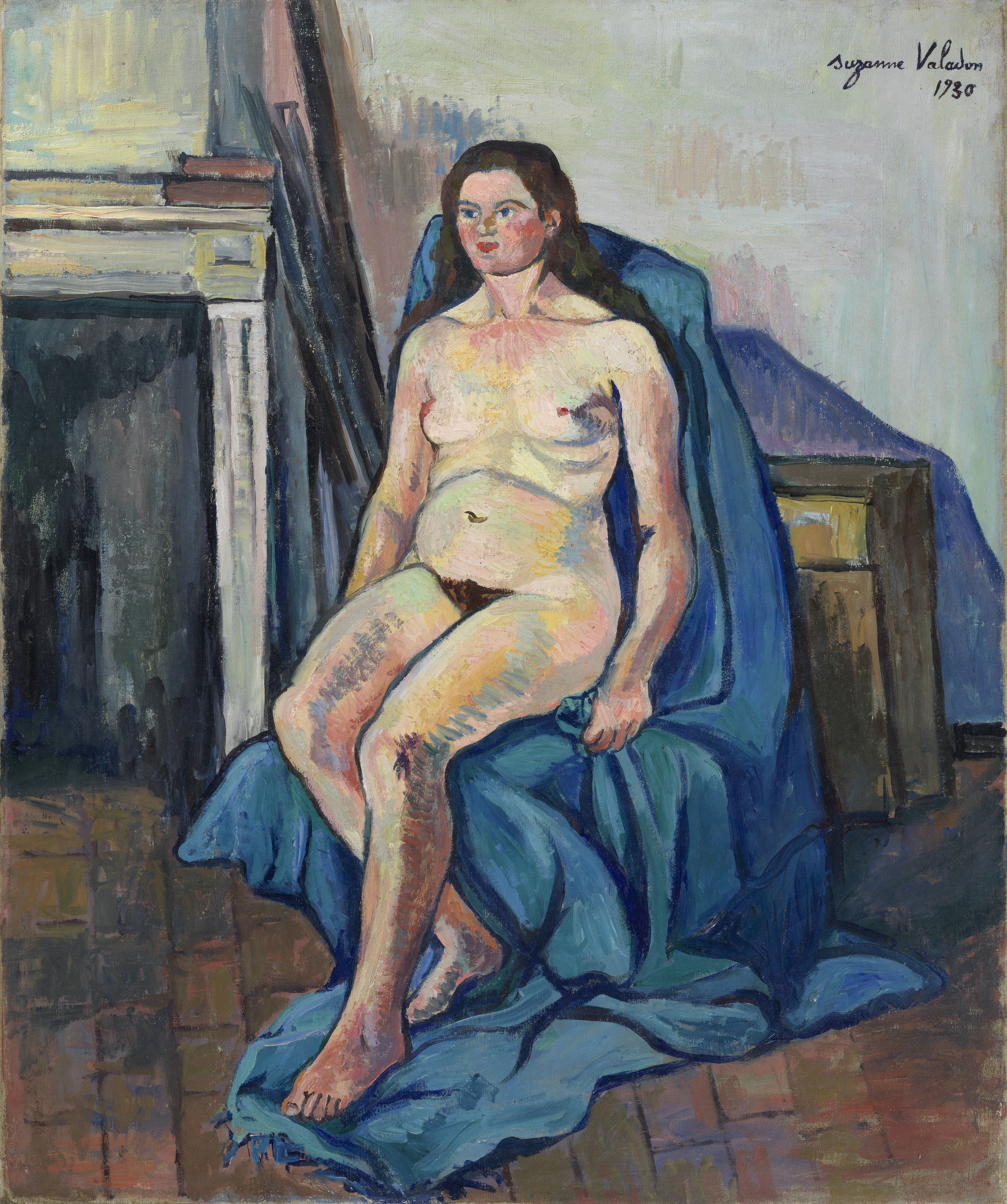
- Artist: Suzanne Valadon
- Year: 1930
- Medium: oil paint on canvas
- Movement: Nude
- Subject: a naked brunette woman with a blue shawl
- Dimensions: 65 cm × 54.5 cm (26 in × 21.5 in)
- Location: Unterlinden Museum, Colmar
- Accession: 2008

Nude Woman with a Blue Shawl (French: Nu au châle bleu) is a 1930 oil painting by the French artist Suzanne Valadon, today in the collection of the Unterlinden Museum in Colmar, Alsace (inventory number 2008.8.117). It depicts an anonymous model in an unglamorous setting, and belongs to the last and most mature period of Valadon's work. The painting is one of the more than 120 works of French modern art that were bequeathed to the museum by the collector, French journalist Jean-Paul Person (1927–2008), in 2008 (Person had already donated 16 works to the museum in 2004).

== See also ==
- List of paintings by Suzanne Valadon
