= Portrait of Suzanne Valadon (Toulouse-Lautrec) =

Painting by Henri de Toulouse-Lautrec

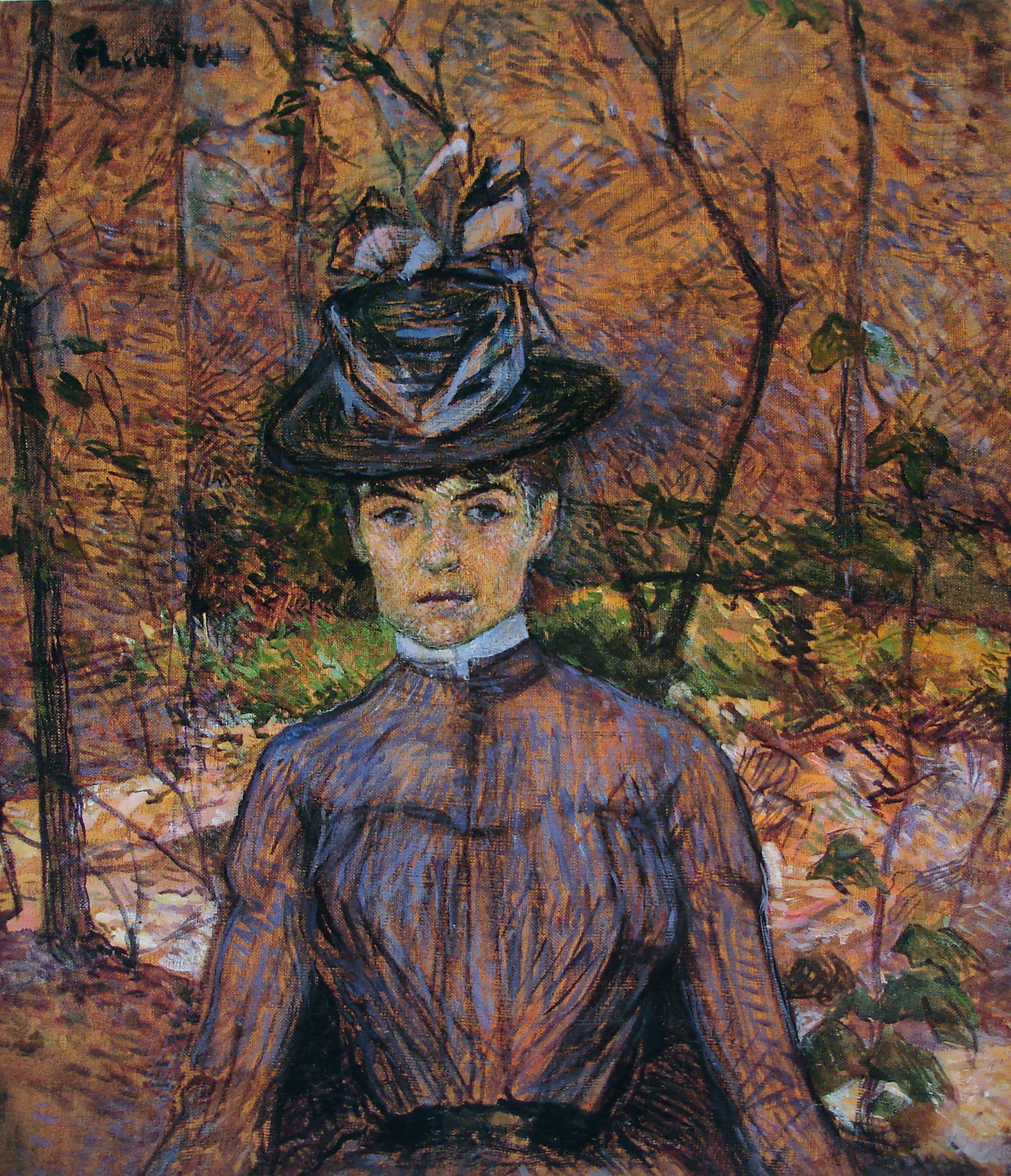
- Artist: Henri de Toulouse-Lautrec
- Year: 1885
- Medium: oil on canvas
- Dimensions: 55 cm × 46 cm (22 in × 18 in)
- Location: Museo Nacional de Bellas Artes, Buenos Aires
- Accession no.: 2710

Portrait of Suzanne Valadon is an 1885 painting by Henri de Toulouse-Lautrec now held at the Museo Nacional de Bellas Artes in Buenos Aires. Toulouse-Lautrec and the artist and model Suzanne Valadon were friends in Montmartre in Paris. Henri de Toulouse was a highly renowned artist at the time, as was Suzanne Valadon. Lautrec made many portraits of Valadon and supported her journey through the art industry. They were seen as lovers by the town of Montmartre until their relations ended in 1888.

Toulouse-Lautrec created this portrait of Suzanne as she walked directly toward the viewer in what seems like autumn as Lautrec puts an emphasis on the color behind Valadon. He presents Suzanne as very fashionable with her purple dress and hat. The way Lautrec uses light in this piece is intriguing as Valadon stands out from her background, even with similar colors seen throughout the portrait.
