= Suzanne Valadon =

French painter and artists' model (1865–1938)

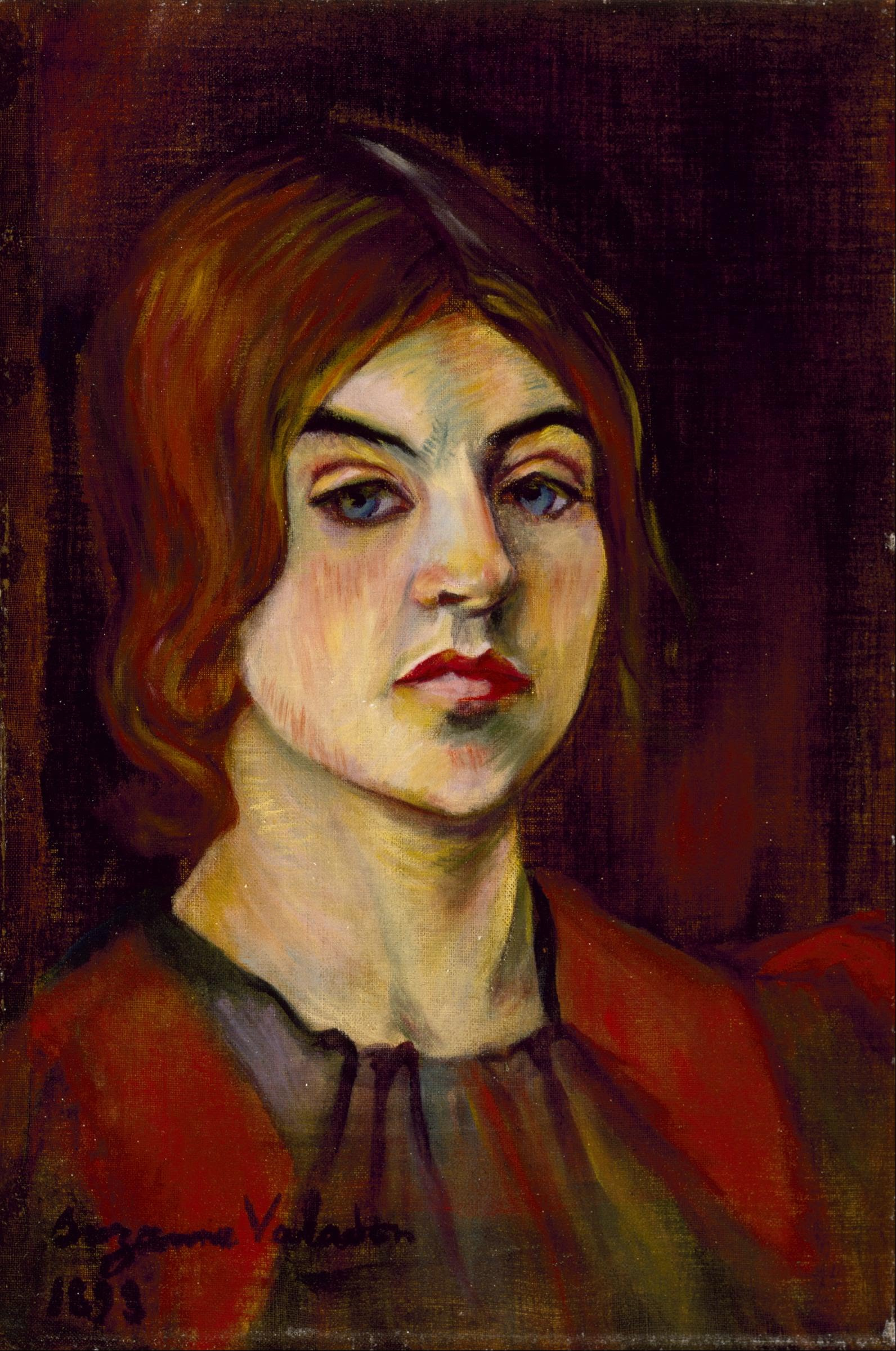
- Self-portrait, 1898, Museum of Fine Arts Houston
- Born: Marie-Clémentine Valadon; 23 September 1865; Bessines-sur-Gartempe, France
- Died: 7 April 1938 (aged 72); Paris, France
- Known for: Painter
- Movement: Post-Impressionism, Symbolism
- Spouses: Paul Mousis, André Utter
- Partner(s): Erik Satie, Henri de Toulouse-Lautrec

Marie-Clémentine "Suzanne" Valadon (French pronunciation: [syzan valadɔ̃]; 23 September 1865 – 7 April 1938) was a French painter who was born at Bessines-sur-Gartempe, Haute-Vienne, France. In 1894, Valadon became the first female painter admitted to the Société Nationale des Beaux-Arts. She was also the mother of painter Maurice Utrillo.

Valadon spent nearly 40 years of her life as an artist. The subjects of her drawings and paintings, such as Joy of Life (1911), included mostly female nudes, portraits of women, still lifes, and landscapes. She never attended the academy and was never confined within a set tradition or style of art. Despite not being confined to any tradition, she shocked the art world as the first woman painter to depict a male nude as well as less idealized images of women in comparison to those of her male counterparts.

She was a model for many renowned artists. Among them, Valadon appeared in such paintings as Dance at Bougival (1883) and Dance in the City by Pierre-Auguste Renoir (1883), and Suzanne Valadon (1885) and The Hangover (Suzanne Valadon) (1887–1889) by Henri de Toulouse-Lautrec.

== Early life ==
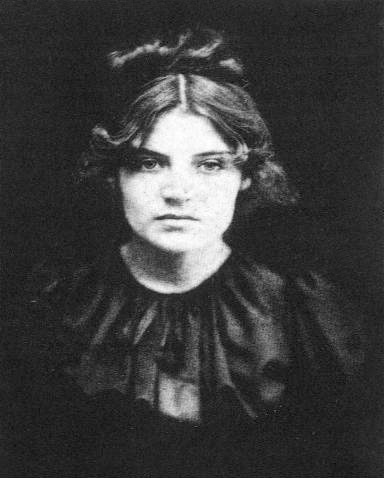
Valadon as a young woman

Valadon grew up in poverty with her mother, an unmarried laundress in Montmartre. She did not know her father. Known to be quite independent and rebellious, she attended primary school until age eleven when she began working.

She had a series of jobs that included working in a milliner's workshop, at a factory making funeral wreaths, selling vegetables, and as a waitress. In 1880, aged 15, she obtained a job in her most desired field: performing in Cirque Fernando as an acrobat. She was able to work at the circus because of her connection with Count Antoine de La Rochefoucauld and Thèo Wagner, two symbolist painters, who were involved in decorating a circus belonging to Medrano. The circus was visited frequently by artists such as Toulouse-Lautrec and Berthe Morisot and it is speculated that this was the inspiration for a painting of Valadon by Morisot. A fall from a trapeze that injured her back is what ultimately ended her circus career after one year.

It is commonly believed that Valadon taught herself how to draw at the age of nine. In the Montmartre quarter of Paris, she pursued her interest in art, first working as a model and a muse for artists, observing and learning their techniques, as she could not afford art lessons herself. She observed and learned from artists, such as Pierre Puvis de Chavannes, Henri de Toulouse-Lautrec, and Pierre-Auguste Renoir, before becoming a noted and successful painter in her own right.

== Model ==
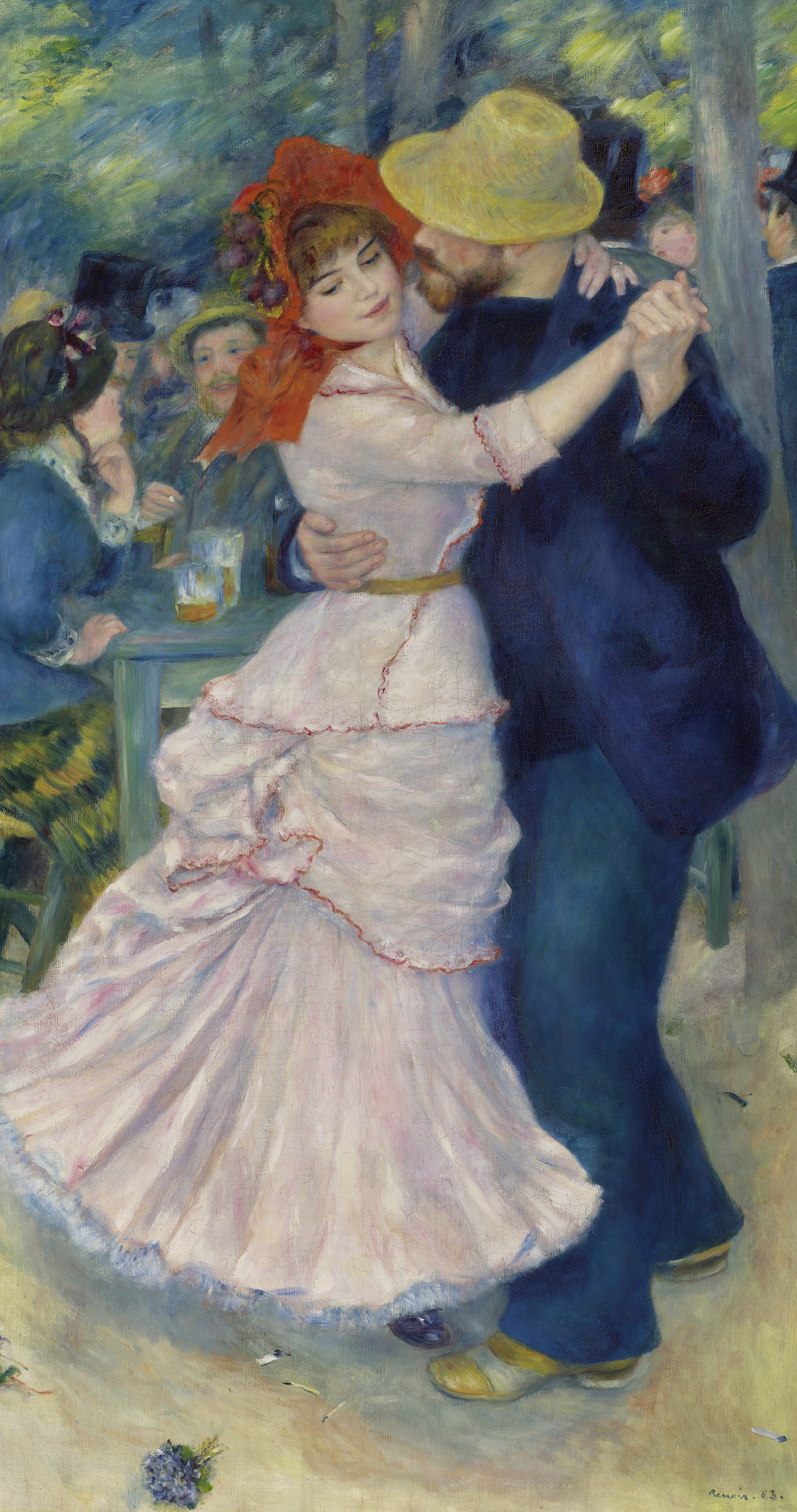
Valadon is depicted dancing in Dance at Bougival (1883), by Pierre-Auguste Renoir

Valadon began working as a model in 1880 in Montmartre at age 15. She modeled for more than ten years for many different artists including Berthe Morisot, Pierre-Cécile Puvis de Chavannes, Théophile Steinlen, Pierre-Auguste Renoir, Jean-Jacques Henner, and Henri de Toulouse-Lautrec. She modeled under the name "Maria" before being nicknamed "Suzanne" by Toulouse-Lautrec, after the biblical story of Susanna and the Elders as he felt that she especially preferred modeling for older artists. She was Toulouse-Lautrec's lover for two years, which ended when she attempted suicide in 1888.

Valadon learned and furthered her art by observing the techniques of the artists for whom she posed. She was considered a very focused, ambitious, rebellious, determined, self-confident, and passionate woman. In the early 1890s, she befriended Edgar Degas, who was impressed by her bold line drawings and fine paintings. He purchased her work and encouraged her. She remained one of his closest friends until his death in 1917. Art historian Heather Dawkins believed that Valadon's experience as a model added depth to her own images of nude women, which tended to be less idealized than the representations of women by the male post-impressionists.

Morisot's 1880 drawing of Valadon as a tightrope walker preceded it, but the most recognizable early image of Valadon is in Renoir's Dance at Bougival from 1883, the same year that she posed for Dance in the City. In 1885, Renoir painted her portrait again as Girl Braiding Her Hair. Another of his portraits of her in 1885, Suzanne Valadon, is of her head and shoulders in profile. Valadon frequented the bars and taverns of Paris with her fellow painters and she was Toulouse-Lautrec's subject in his oil painting The Hangover.

== Artist ==
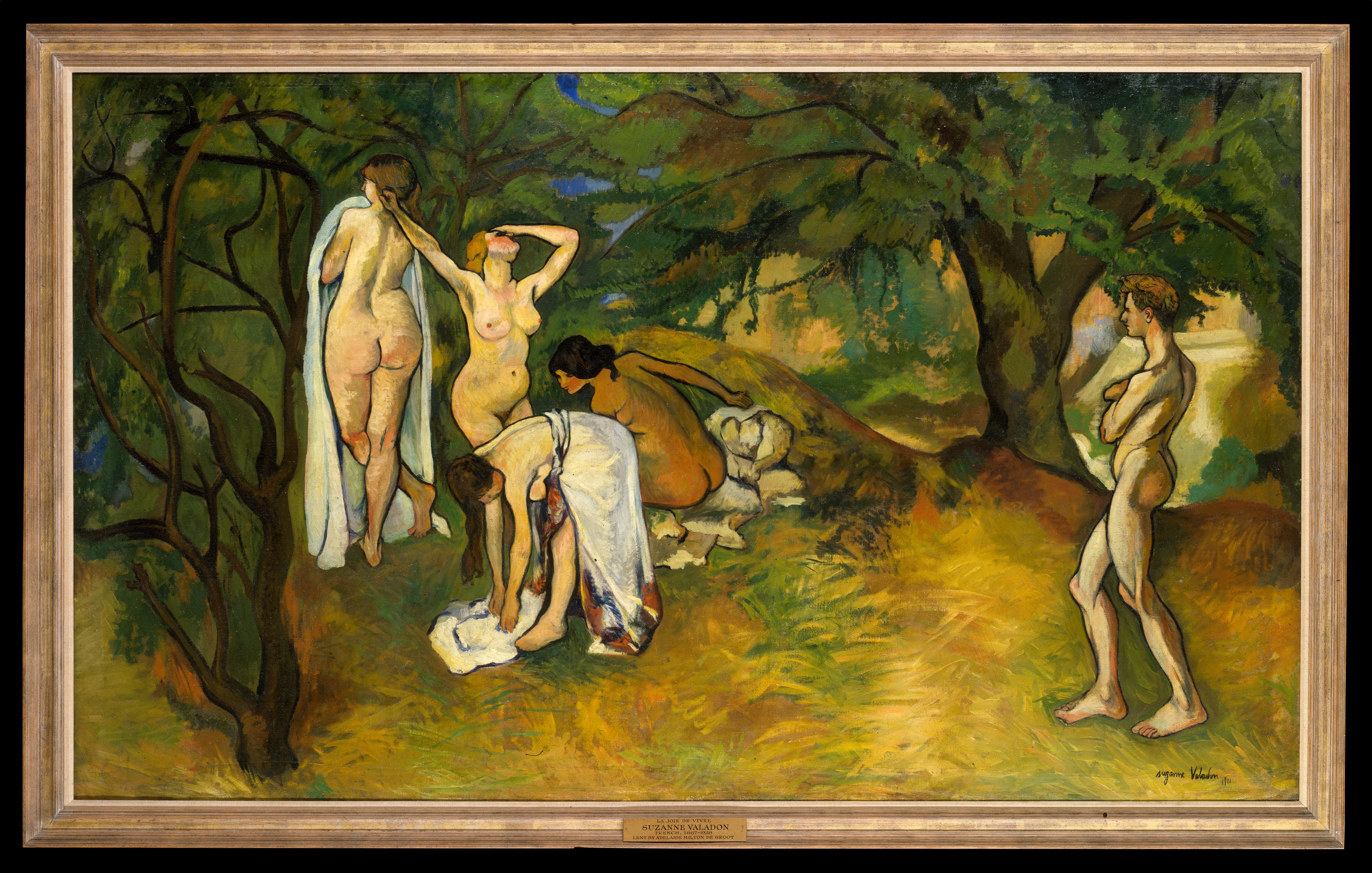
Joy of Life (1911), by Suzanne Valadon, Metropolitan Museum of Art

Valadon was an acclaimed painter of her time, well-respected and championed by contemporaries such as Edgar Degas and Pierre-Auguste Renoir. She was admitted to professional associations and her works were admitted to juried exhibitions. She lived a bohemian life with rebellious vision.

Valadon's earliest surviving signed and dated work is a self-portrait from 1883, drawn in charcoal and pastel. She produced mostly drawings between 1883 and 1893, and began painting in 1892. Her first models were family members, especially her son, mother, and niece.

Valadon began painting full-time in 1896. She painted still lifes, portraits, flowers, and landscapes that are noted for their strong composition and vibrant colors. She was, however, best known for her candid female nudes. Her work attracted attention partly because, by painting unidealized nudes, she upset the social norms of the time that had been created by male artists.

Her earliest known female nude was executed in 1892. In 1895, the art dealer Paul Durand-Ruel exhibited a group of twelve etchings by Valadon that show women in various stages of their toilettes. Later, she regularly showed at Galerie Bernheim-Jeune in Paris. Valadon was the first woman painter accepted as an exhibitor in the Salon de la Nationale in 1894, which is notable since competition for acceptance was fierce.

She exhibited in the Salon d'Automne from 1909, in the Salon des Independants from 1911, and in the Salon des Femmes Artistes Modernes from 1933 to 1938. Notably, Degas was the first person to purchase drawings from her, and he introduced her to other collectors, including Paul Durand-Ruel and Ambroise Vollard. Degas also taught her the skill of soft-ground etching.

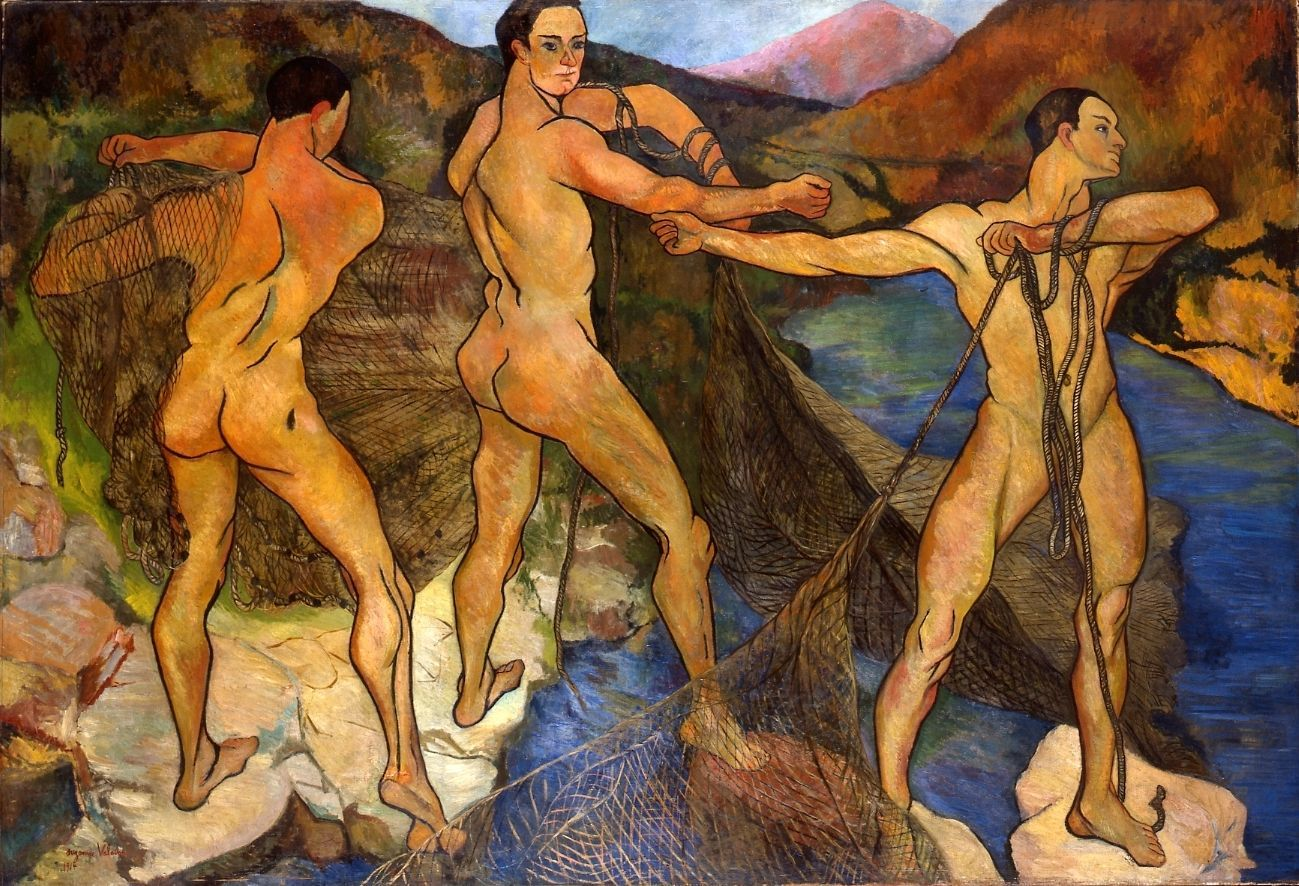
Casting the Net (1914), by Suzanne Valadon, Museum of Fine Arts Nancy

After her 1895 marriage to the well-to-do banker Paul Mousis, Valadon became a full-time painter the following year. She made a shift from drawing to painting in 1909. Her first large oils for the Salon related to sexual pleasures and they were some of the first examples in modern painting with a man being an object of desire by a woman similar to that idealized treatment of women by male artists. These notable Salon paintings include Adam and Eve (Adam et Eve) (1909), Joy of Life (La Joie de vivre) (1911), and Casting the Net (Lancement du filet) (1914). In her lifetime, Valadon produced approximately 273 drawings, 478 paintings, and 31 etchings, excluding pieces given away or destroyed.

Valadon was well known during her lifetime, especially toward the end of her career, in the 1920s more specifically, as she helped to transform the female nude that depicted expression through a woman's experience. Her works are in the collection of the Centre Georges Pompidou in Paris, the Museum of Grenoble, and the Metropolitan Museum of Art in New York, among others.

Valadon's painting of an acrobat, L' Acrobate ou La Roue, sold in 2017 for £75,000 by Christie's Auction House.

=== Style ===
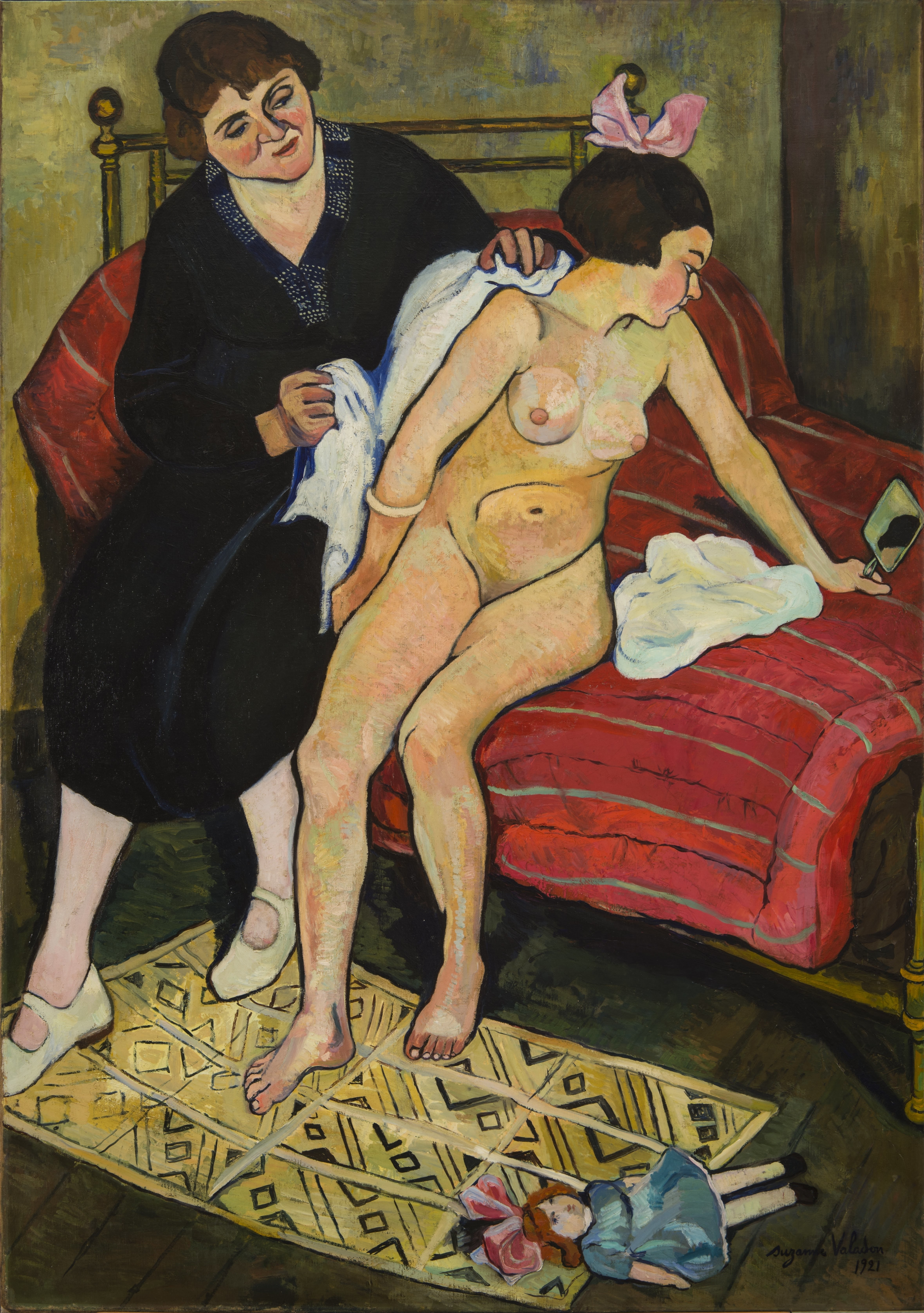
The Abandoned Doll (1921), by Suzanne Valadon, National Museum of Women in the Arts

Valadon was not confined to a specific style, yet both Symbolist and Post-Impressionist aesthetics are clearly demonstrated within her work. She worked primarily with oil paint, oil pencils, pastels, and red chalk; she did not use ink or watercolor because these mediums were too fluid for her preference. Valadon's paintings feature rich colors and bold, open brushwork often featuring firm black lines to define and outline her figures.

Valadon's self-portraits, portraits, nudes, landscapes, and still lifes remain detached from trends and contemporaneous aspects of academic art. The subjects of Valadon's paintings often reinvent the old master themes: women bathing, reclining nudes, and interior scenes. She preferred to paint working-class models. Art historian Patricia Mathews suggests that Valadon's working-class status and experience as a model influenced her intimate, familiar observation of these women and their bodies. In this respect she differed from Berthe Morisot and Mary Cassatt, who painted mostly women, but "remained well within the bounds of propriety in their subject matter" because of their upper-middle-class status in French society. Valadon's marginalized status allowed her to enter the contemporary male dominated domain of art through modeling and her lack of formal academic training may have made her less influenced by academic conventions. She has been noted for that difference in her paintings of the nude women. She resisted typical depictions of women, emphasizing class trappings and their sexual attractiveness, through her realistic depiction of unidealised and self-possessed women who are not overly sexualised. She also painted many nude self-portraits across the span of her career, the later of which displayed her aging body realistically.

Valadon emphasized the importance of the composition of her portraits over techniques such as painting expressive eyes. Her later works, such as Blue Room (1923), are brighter in color and show a new emphasis on decorative backgrounds and patterned materials.

== Personal life ==
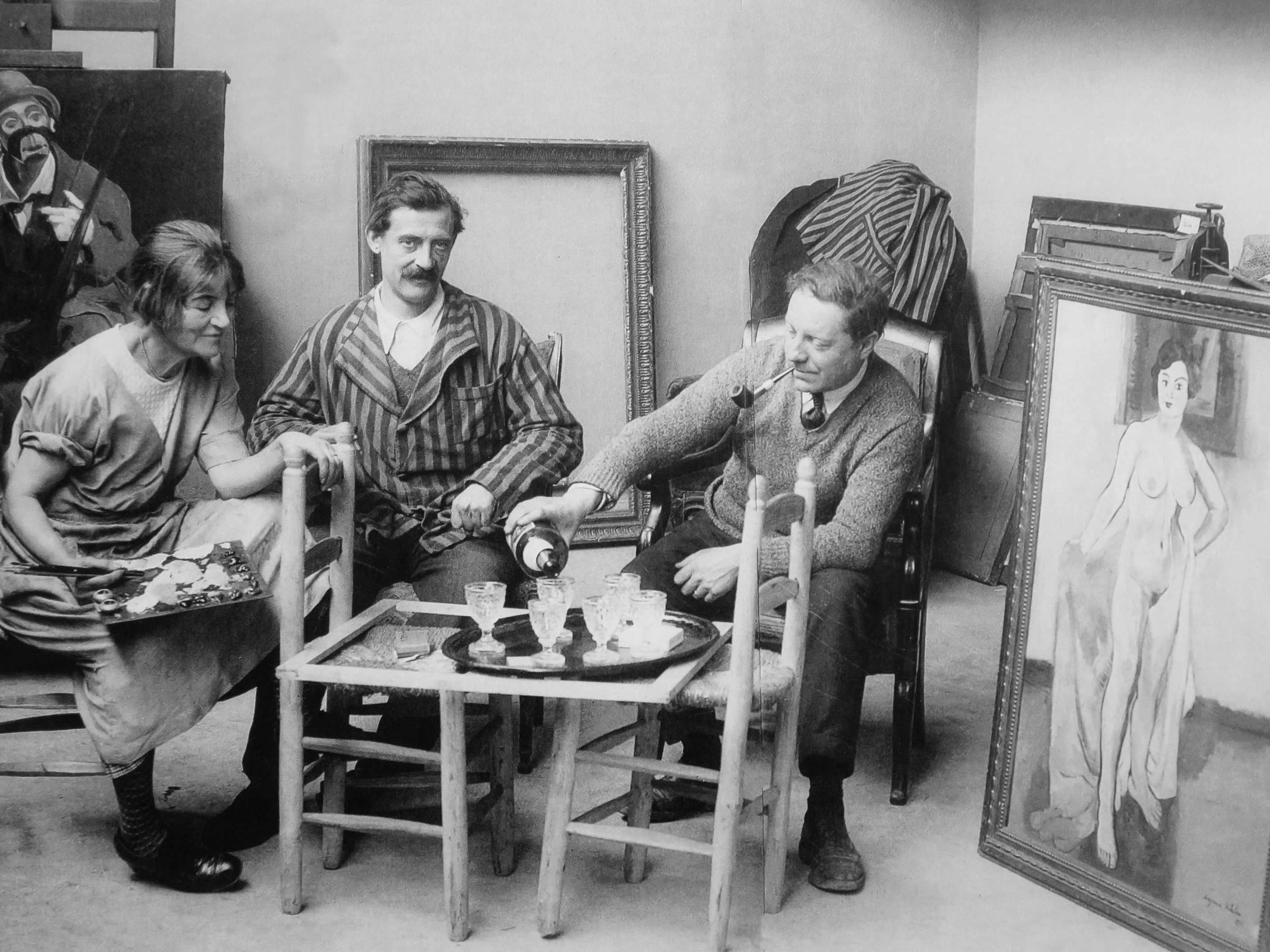
Aperitif in Montmartre, on Avenue Junot, with Suzanne Valadon, Maurice Utrillo and André Utter, 1926-1927

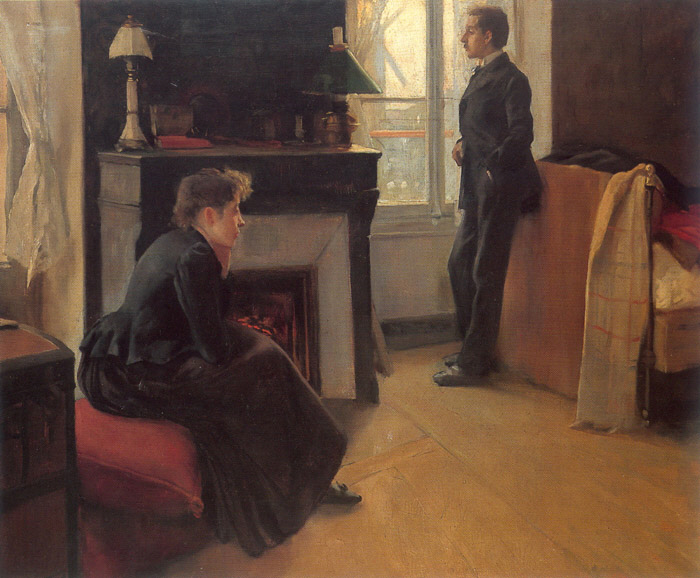
Santiago Rusiñol, Summer shower, 1891. Suzanne Valadon and Miquel Utrillo in the studio of Rusiñol

In 1883, aged 18, Valadon gave birth to a son, Maurice Utrillo. Valadon's mother cared for Maurice while she returned to modelling. Later, Valadon's friend Miquel Utrillo signed papers recognizing Maurice as his son, although the true paternity was never disclosed.

In 1893, Valadon began a short-lived affair with composer Erik Satie, moving to a room next to his on the Rue Cortot. Satie became obsessed with her, calling her his Biqui, writing impassioned notes about "her whole being, lovely eyes, gentle hands, and tiny feet". After six months she left, leaving him devastated. Ornella Volta, however, writes that Satie called "the neighborhood police and ask[ed] them to come to rid him of this over-encroaching love".

Valadon married the stockbroker Paul Mousis in 1895. For 13 years, she lived with him in an apartment in Paris and in a house in the outlying region. In 1909, Valadon began an affair with the painter André Utter, a 23-year-old friend of her son. He became a model for her and appears as Adam in Adam et Eve, which was painted that year. She divorced Mousis in 1913. Valadon then married Utter in 1914. Utter managed her career as well as that of her son. Valadon and Utter regularly exhibited work together until the couple divorced in 1934, when Valadon was almost seventy. They continued a relationship until her death, nonetheless, and are buried together in the Saint Ouen cemetery near Paris.

Suzanne Valadon died of a stroke on 7 April 1938, at the age of 72, and was buried in Division 13 of the Cimetière de Saint-Ouen, Paris. Among those in attendance at the funeral were her friends and colleagues André Derain, Pablo Picasso, and Georges Braque.

== Exhibitions ==
=== Group exhibitions ===
- 1894, Société Nationale des Beaux-Arts, Paris
- 1907, Galerie Eugène Blot, Paris
- 1909, Salon d'Automne, Grand Palais, Paris
- 1910, Salon d'Automne, Grand Palais, Paris
- 1911, Salon d'Automne, Grand Palais, Paris
- 1911 - continuing, Salon des Indépendants, Paris
- 1917, Utrillo, Valadon, Utter, Galerie Berthe Weill, Paris
- 1920, Second Exhibition of Young French Painting, Galerie Manzy Joyant, Paris
- 1921, Young Painting, Palais d'Ixelles
- 1926, (retrospective), Salon des Indépendants, Paris
- 1927, Salon des Tuileries, Paris
- 1928, Salon des Tuileries, Paris
- 1933-1938, Salon des Femmes Artistes Modernes, Paris
- 1937, Les femmes artistes d'Europe, Jeu de Paume, Paris

After her death in 1938

- 1940, 22nd Biennale Internationale des Beaux-Arts, Paris
- 1949, Great Trends in Contemporary Painting from Manet to our Day, Musée des Beaux-Arts, Lyons; 1961, Maurice Utrillo V. Suzanne Valadon, Haus der Kunst, Munich
- 1964, Documenta, Kassel
- 1969, Fourteenth Salon de Montrouge
- 1976, Women Artists (1550-1950), Los Angeles County Museum of Art
- 1979, Maurice Utrillo, Suzanne Valadon, Musée Toulouse-Lautrec
- 1991, Albi: Utrillo, Valadon, Utter, Chateau Constant, Bessines
- 1991, Utrillo, Valadon, Utter: la Trilogie Maudite, Acropolis, Nice

=== Solo exhibitions ===
- 1911, the first solo exhibition of the work of Suzanne Valadon, at the Galerie Clovis Sagot
- 1915, Galerie Berthe Weill, Paris
- 1919, Galerie Berthe Weill, Paris
- 1922, Galerie Bernheim-Jeune, Paris
- 1923, Galerie Bernheim-Jeune, Paris
- 1927, retrospective, Galerie Berthe Weill, Paris
- 1928, Galerie des Archers, Lyons
- 1928, Galerie Berthe Weill, Paris
- 1929, Galerie Bernheim-Jeune, Paris
- 1929, Galerie Bernier, Paris
- 1931, Galerie Le Portique, Paris
- 1931, Galerie Le Centaure, Brussels
- 1932, Galerie Le Portique, Paris
- 1932, retrospective with a preface by Édouard Herriot, Galerie Georges Petit, Paris
- 1937, Galerie Bernier, Paris
- 1938, Galerie Pétridès, Paris
- 1939, Galerie Bernier, Paris
- 1942, Galerie Pétridès, Paris
- 1947, Galerie Bernier, Paris
- 1947, Galerie Pétridès, Paris
- 1948, Tribute to Suzanne Valadon, Musée National d'Art Moderne, Paris
- 1956, The Lefevre Gallery, London
- 1959, Galerie Pétridès, Paris
- 1962, Galerie Pétridès, Paris
- 1967, Musée National d'Art Moderne, Paris
- 1996, Suzanne Valadon, Pierre Gianada Foundation, Martigny
- 2021, Barnes Foundation, September 26, 2021 to January 9, 2022, first major U.S. solo exhibition of Valadon's work
- 2022, Glyptoteket, Copenhagen

=== Permanent collections ===
- Albright-Knox, Buffalo
- British Museum, London
- Carnegie Museum of Art, Pittsburgh
- Dallas Museum of Art, Dallas
- Detroit Institute of Arts
- Fine Arts Museums of San Francisco
- Harvard Art Museums, Cambridge
- Indianapolis Museum of Art
- Metropolitan Museum of Art
- Minneapolis Institute of Art
- Musée d'Unterlinden, Colmar
- Musée des beaux-arts de Lyon
- Museum of Fine Arts, Houston
- Museum of Modern Art, New York
- National Museum of Women in the Arts
- Nelson-Atkins Museum of Art, Kansas City
- Petit Palais, Geneva
- Rose Art Museum, Waltham
- Smart Museum of Art, Chicago
- University of Michigan Museum of Art, Ann Arbor

== Gallery ==
=== Artwork by Valadon ===
Self-portrait, 1883

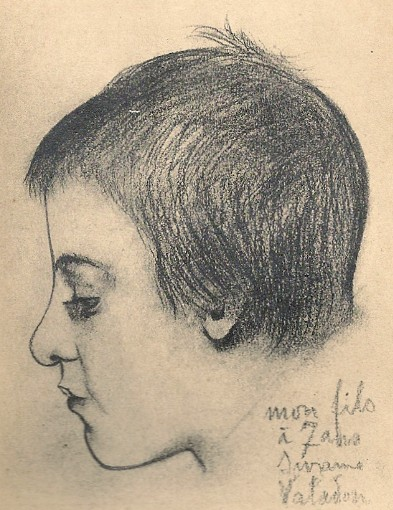
My son at seven years old, 1890

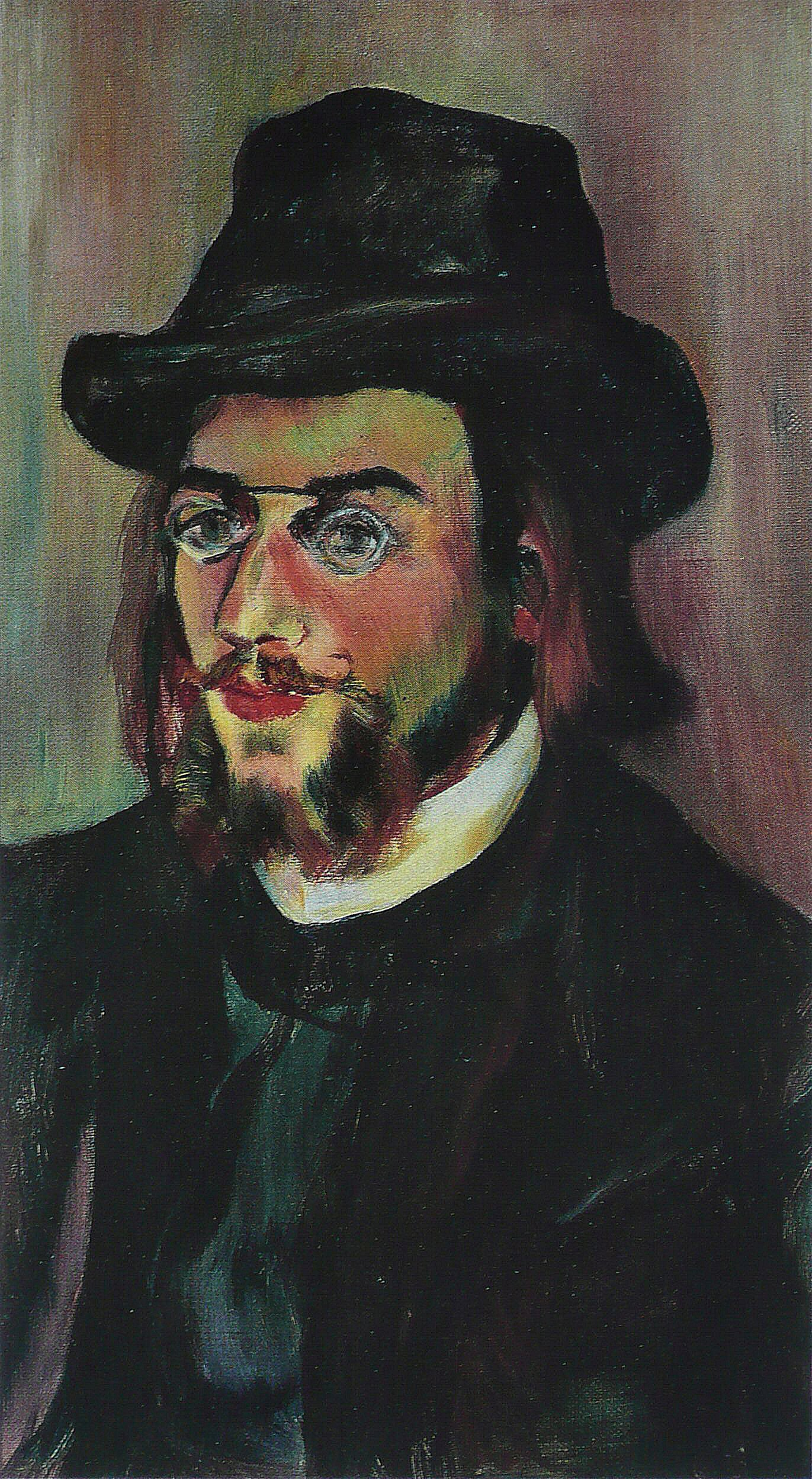
Portrait of Erik Satie, 1893

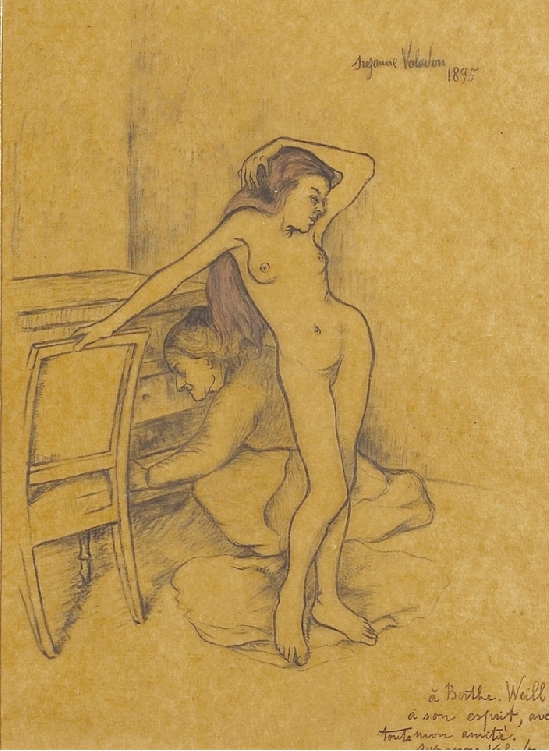
Nude, 1895

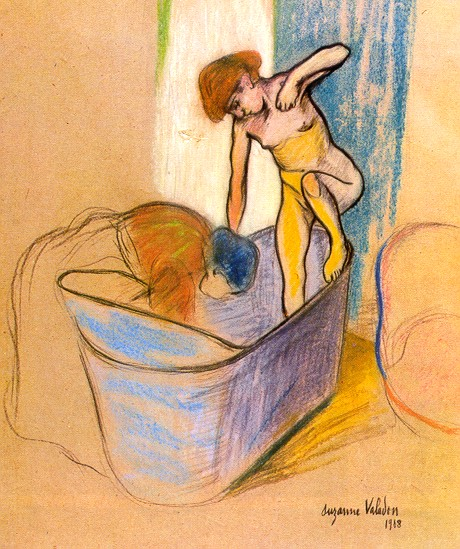
The Bath, 1908

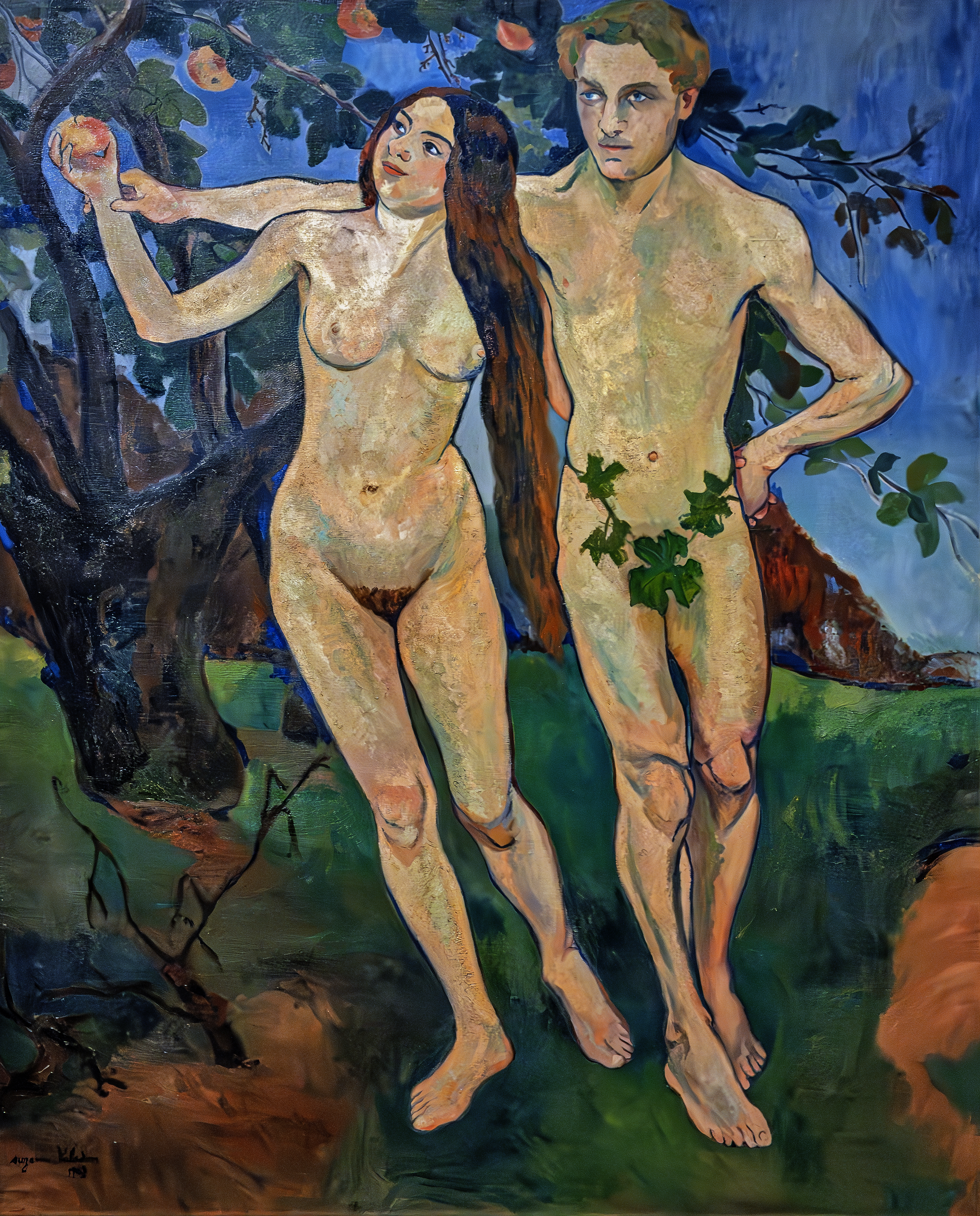
Adam and Eve, by Suzanne Valadon, 1909

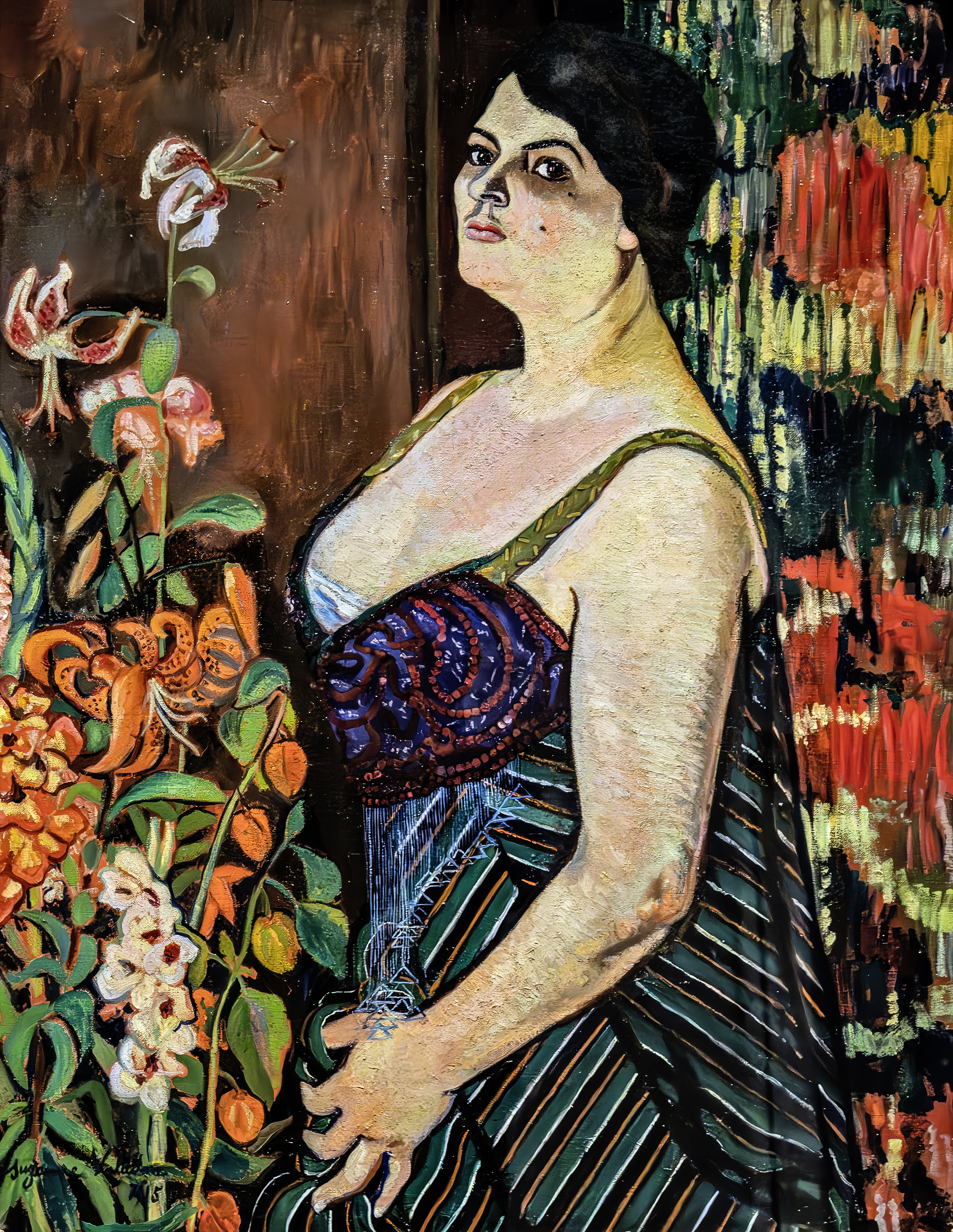
Portrait of Mauricia Coquiot, by Suzanne Valadon, 1915

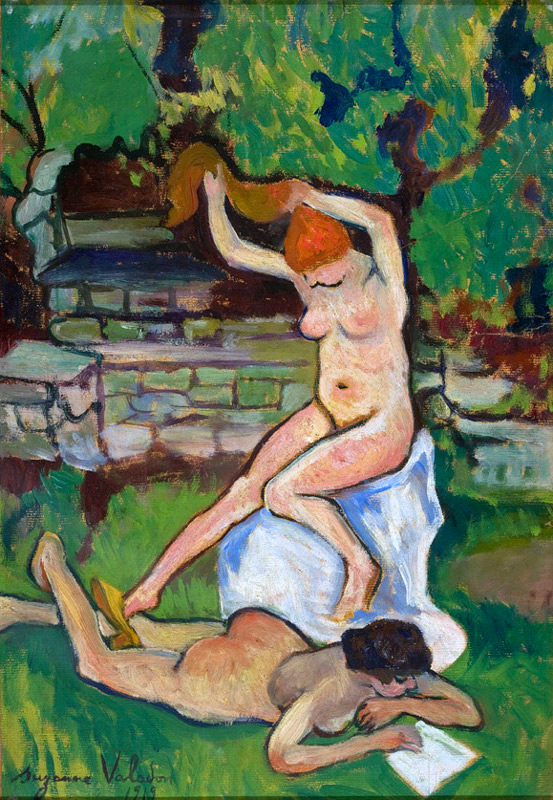
Nudes, 1919

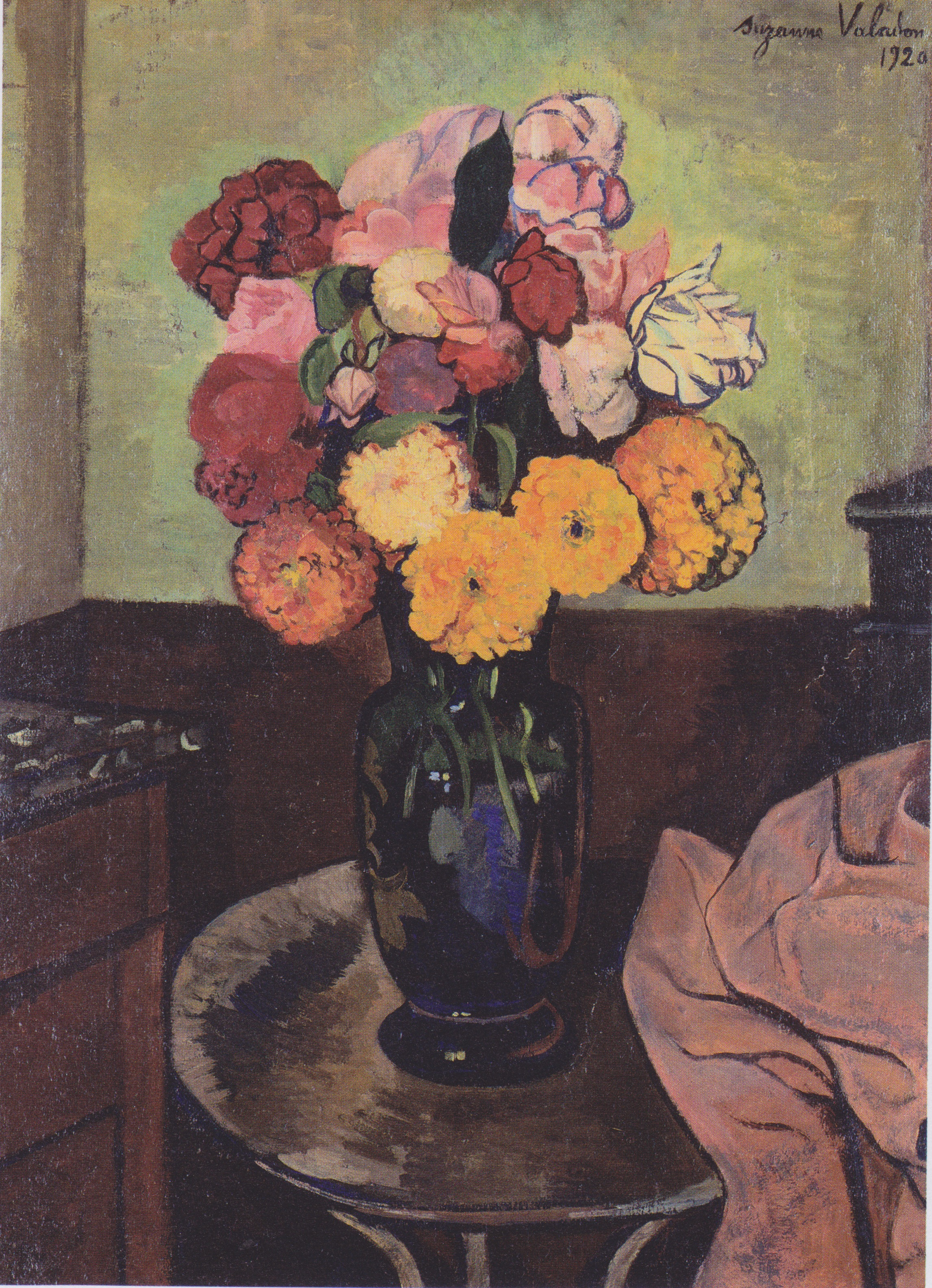
Flowers on a Round Table, 1920

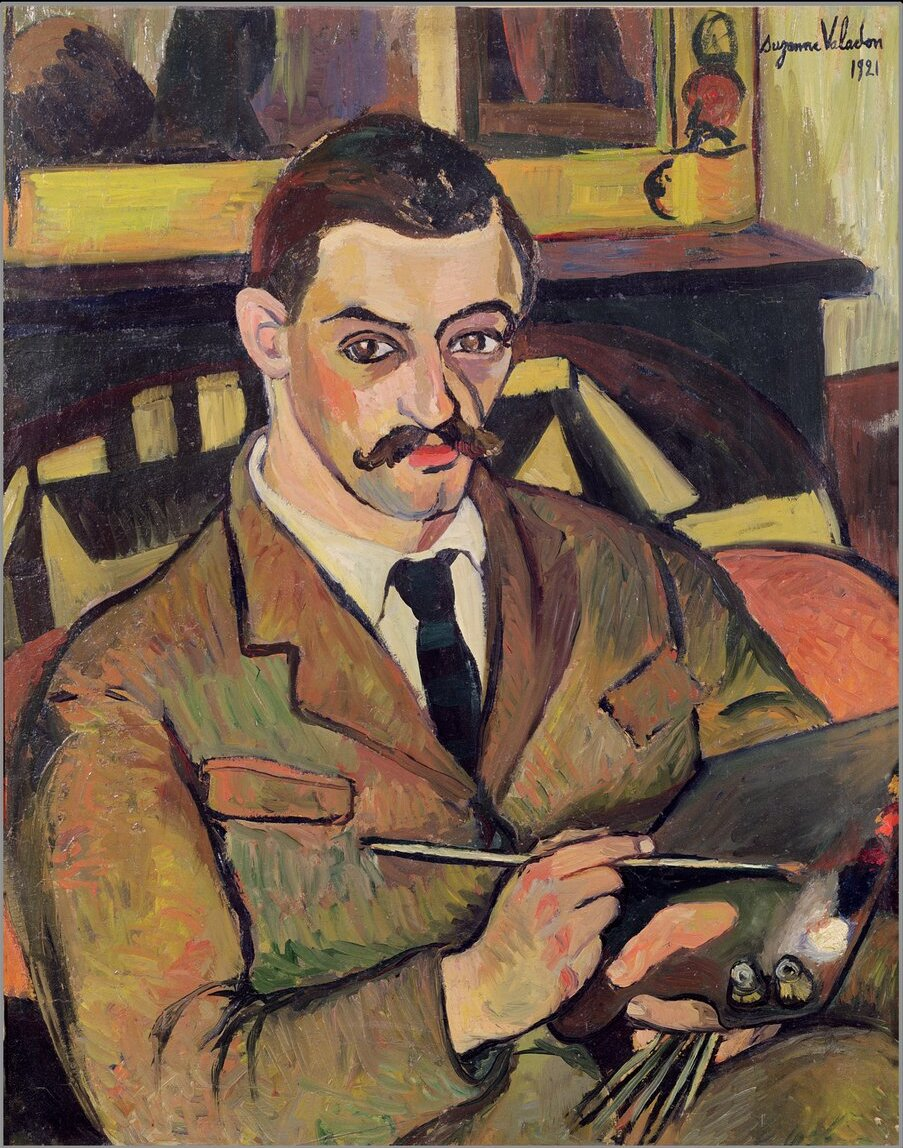
Portrait of the Painter Maurice Utrillo, 1921

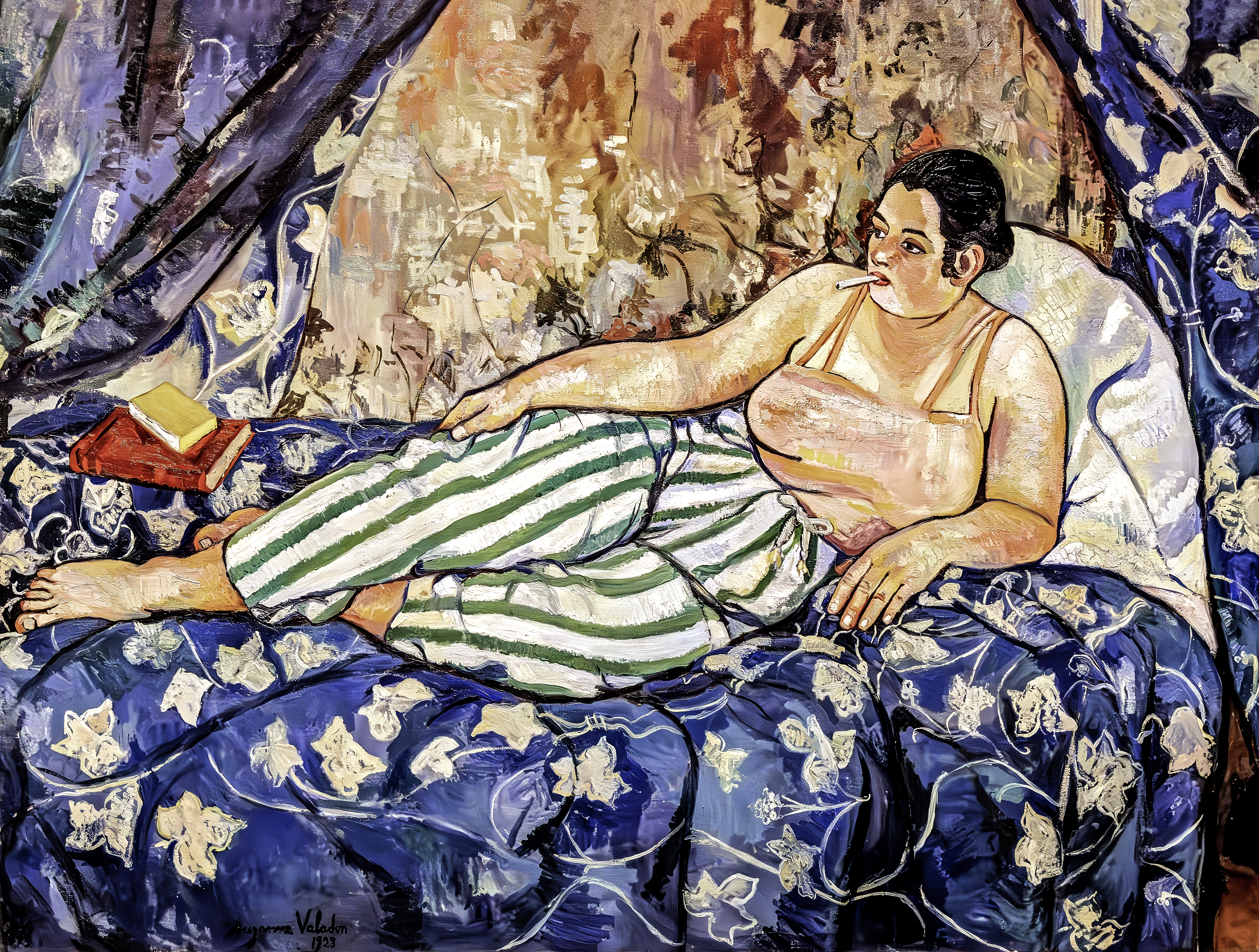
The Blue Room (La chambre bleue), 1923

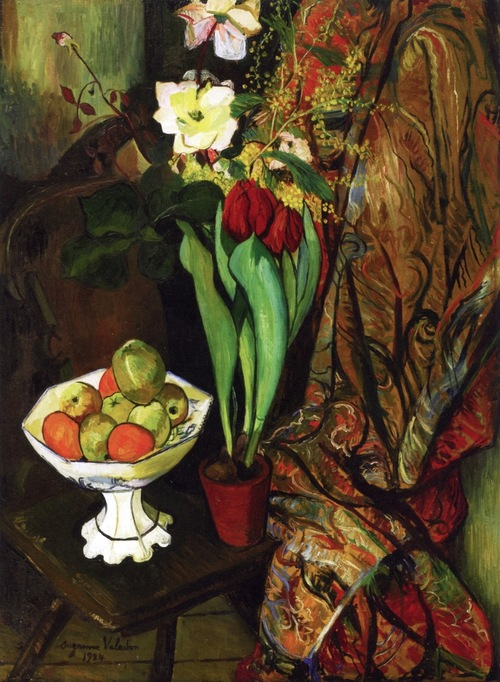
Still Life with Tulips and Fruit Bowl, 1924

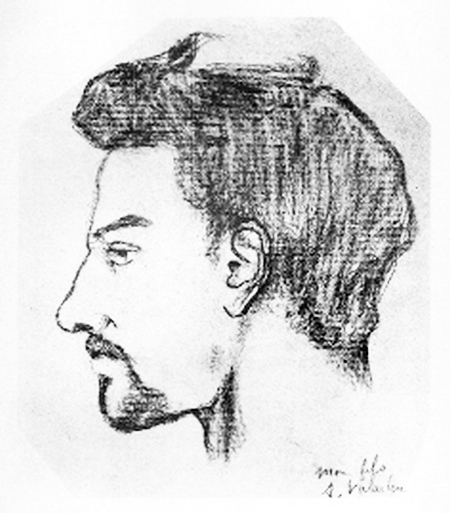
Portrait of Maurice Utrillo, 1925

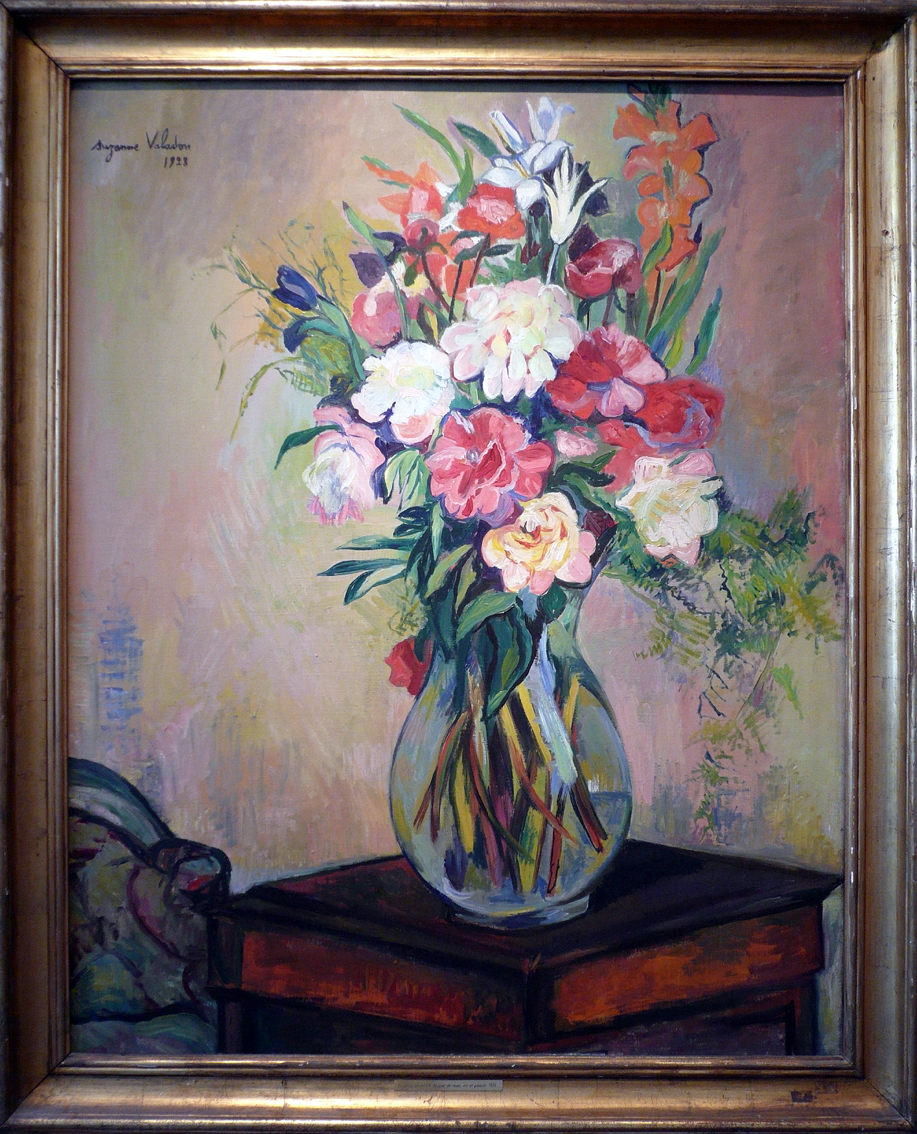
Bouquet of Flowers, 1928

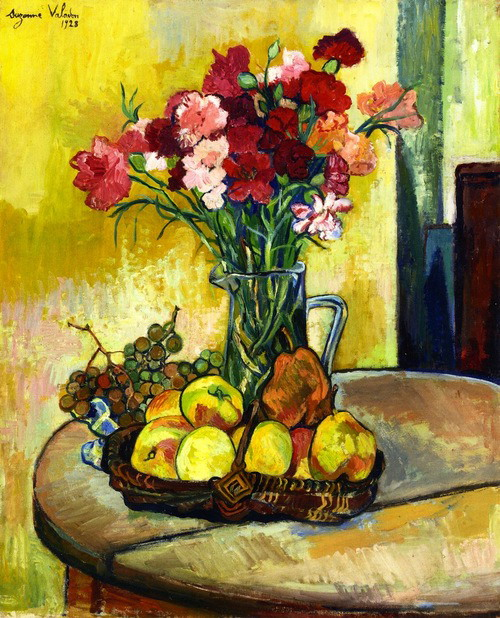
Still Life with Basket of Apples Vase of Flowers, 1928

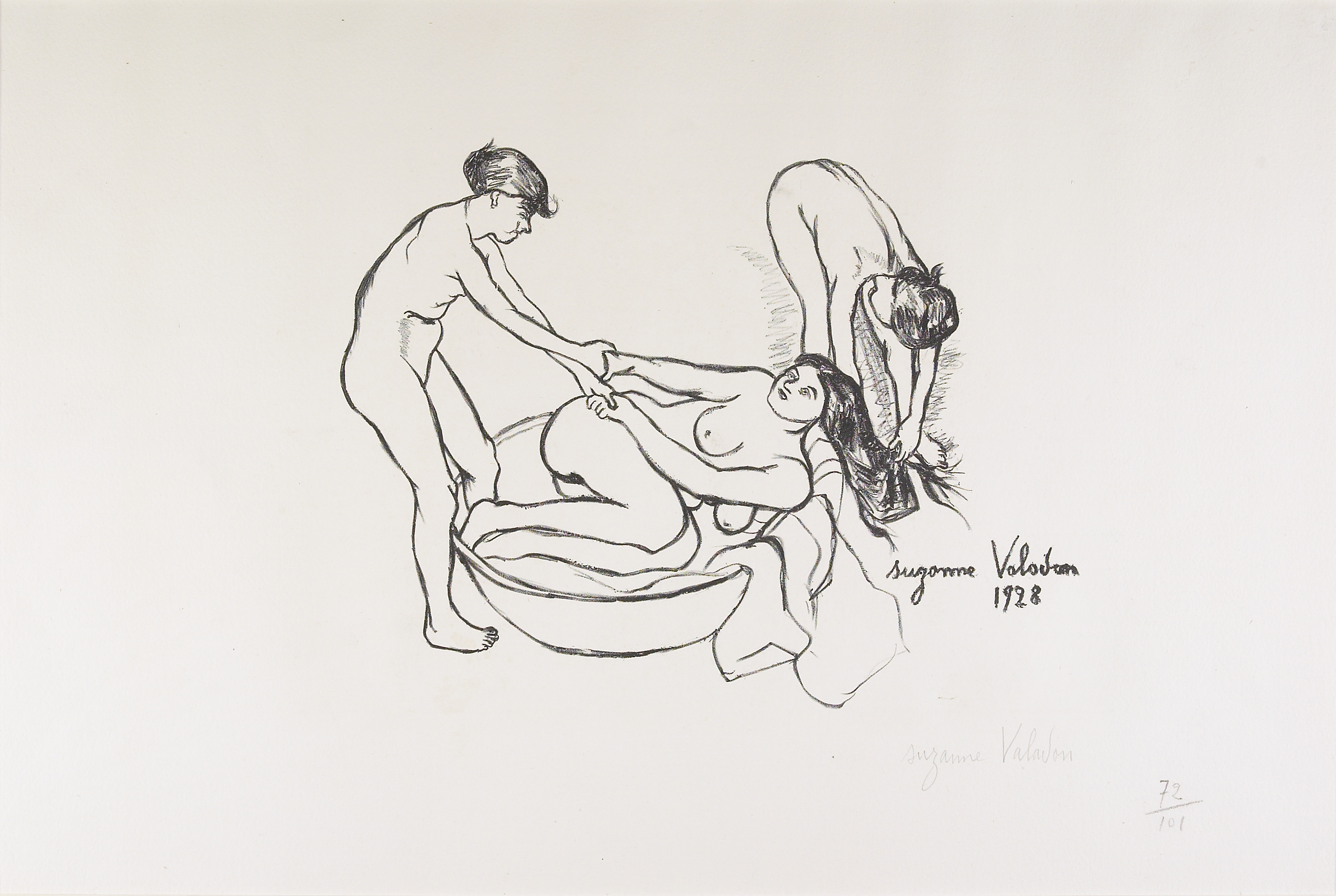
Three Woman Bathing, 1928

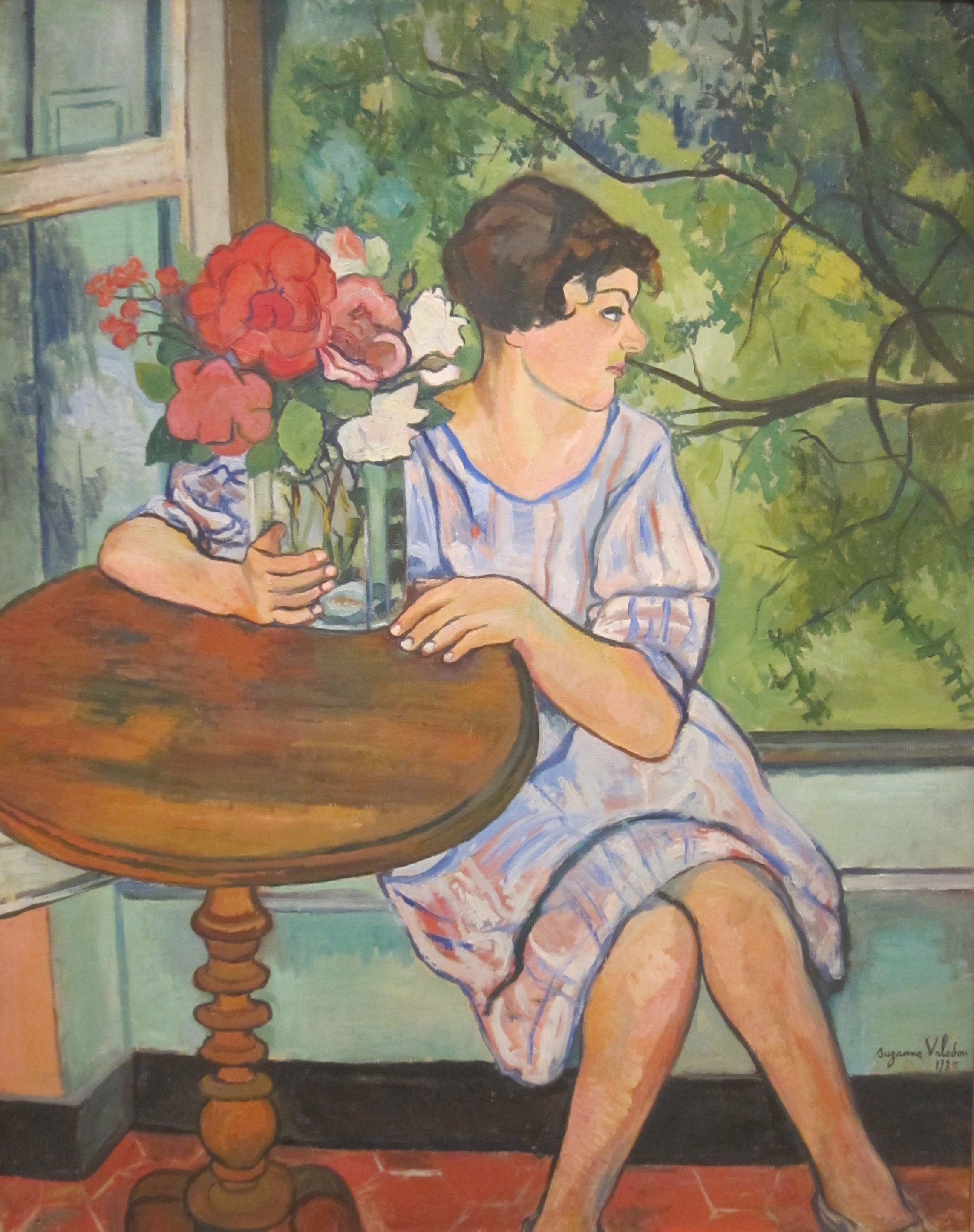
Young Girl in Front of a Window, 1930

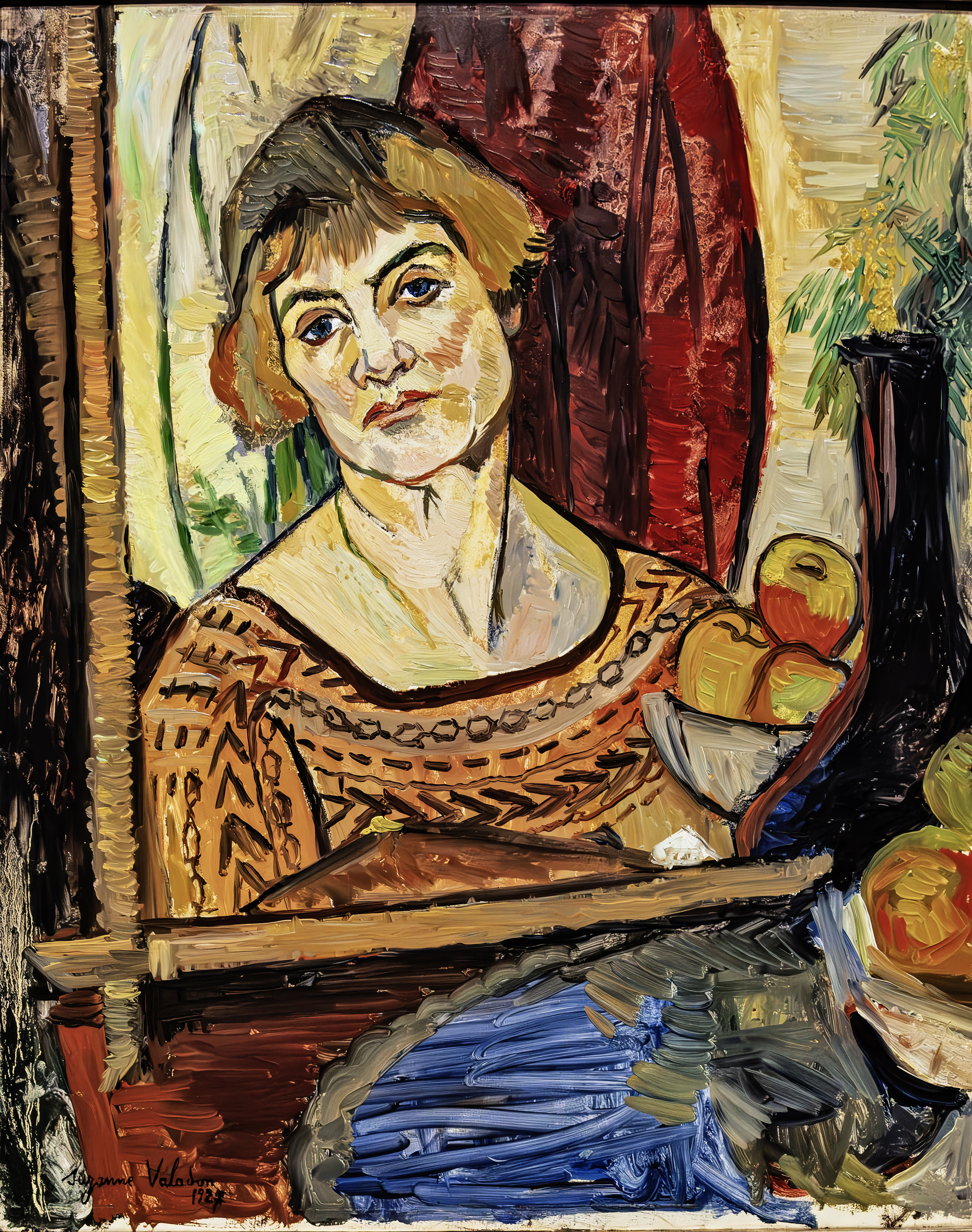
Suzanne Valadon, Self-portrait

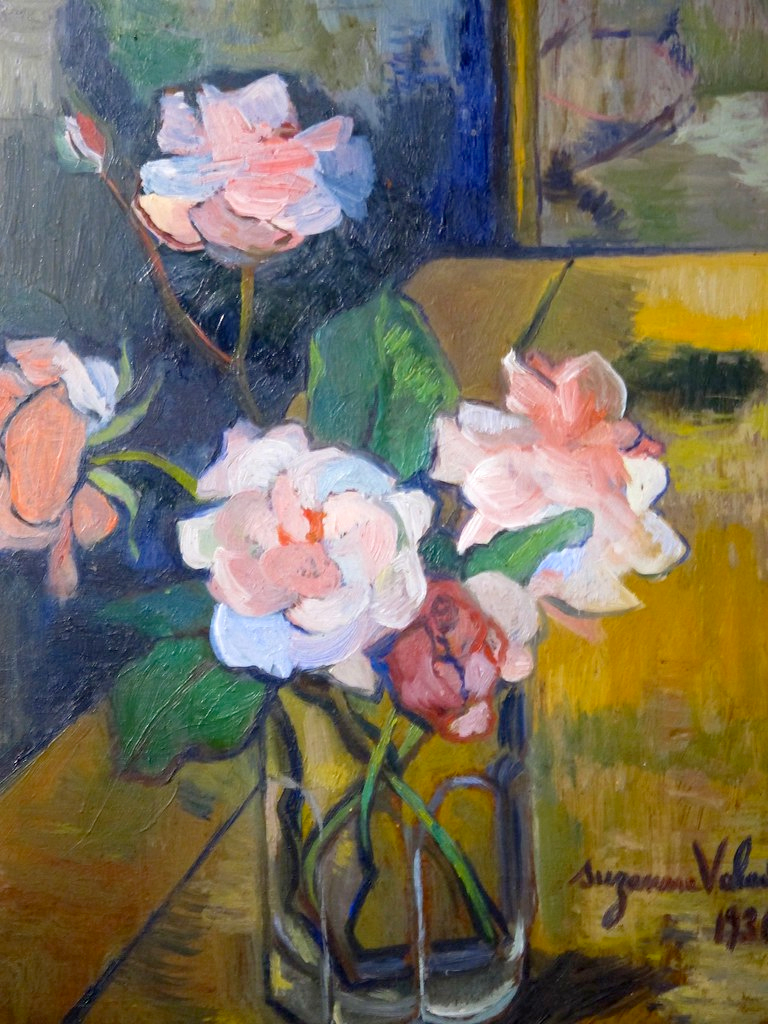
Bouquet de roses, 1936

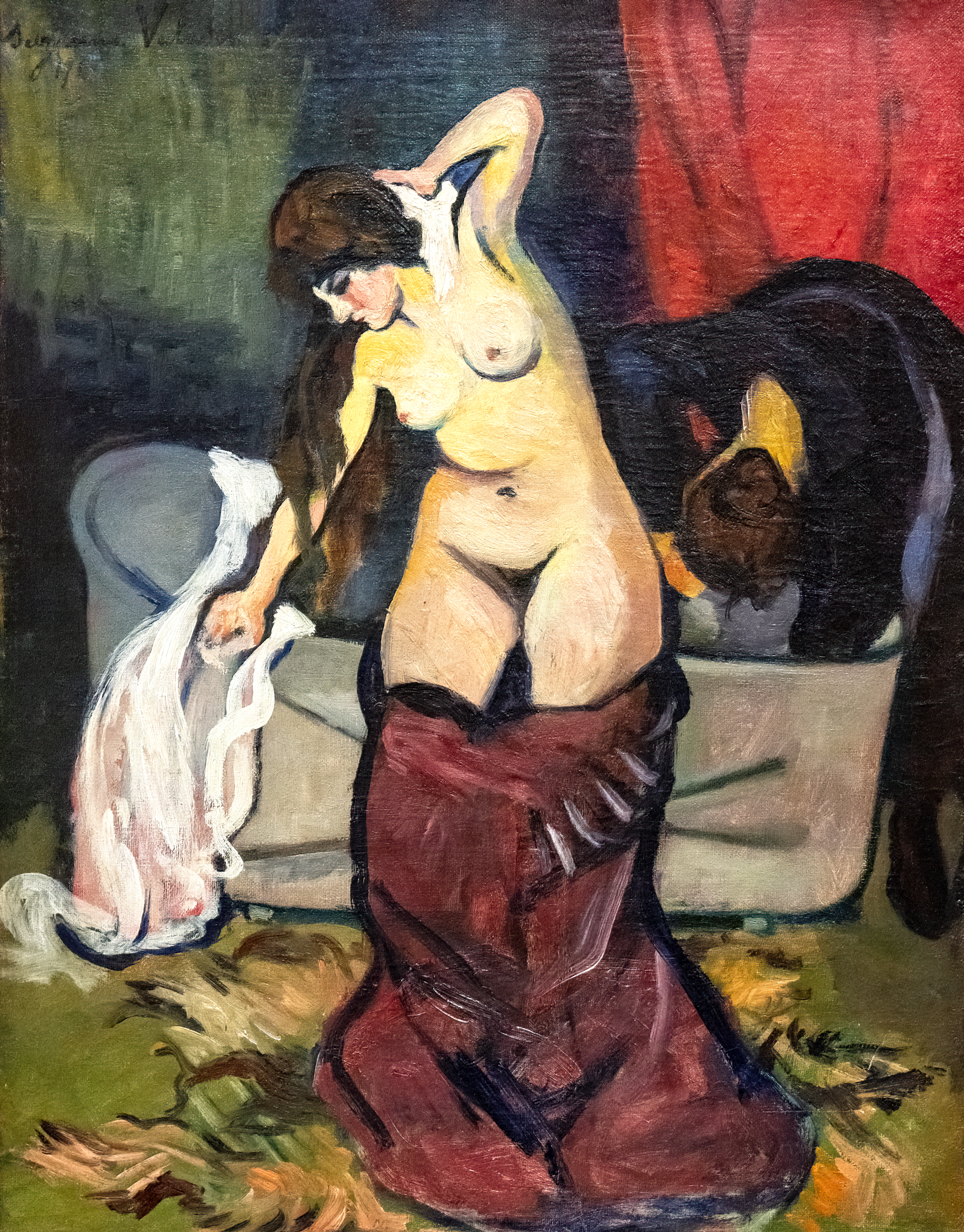
Young Girl Bathing

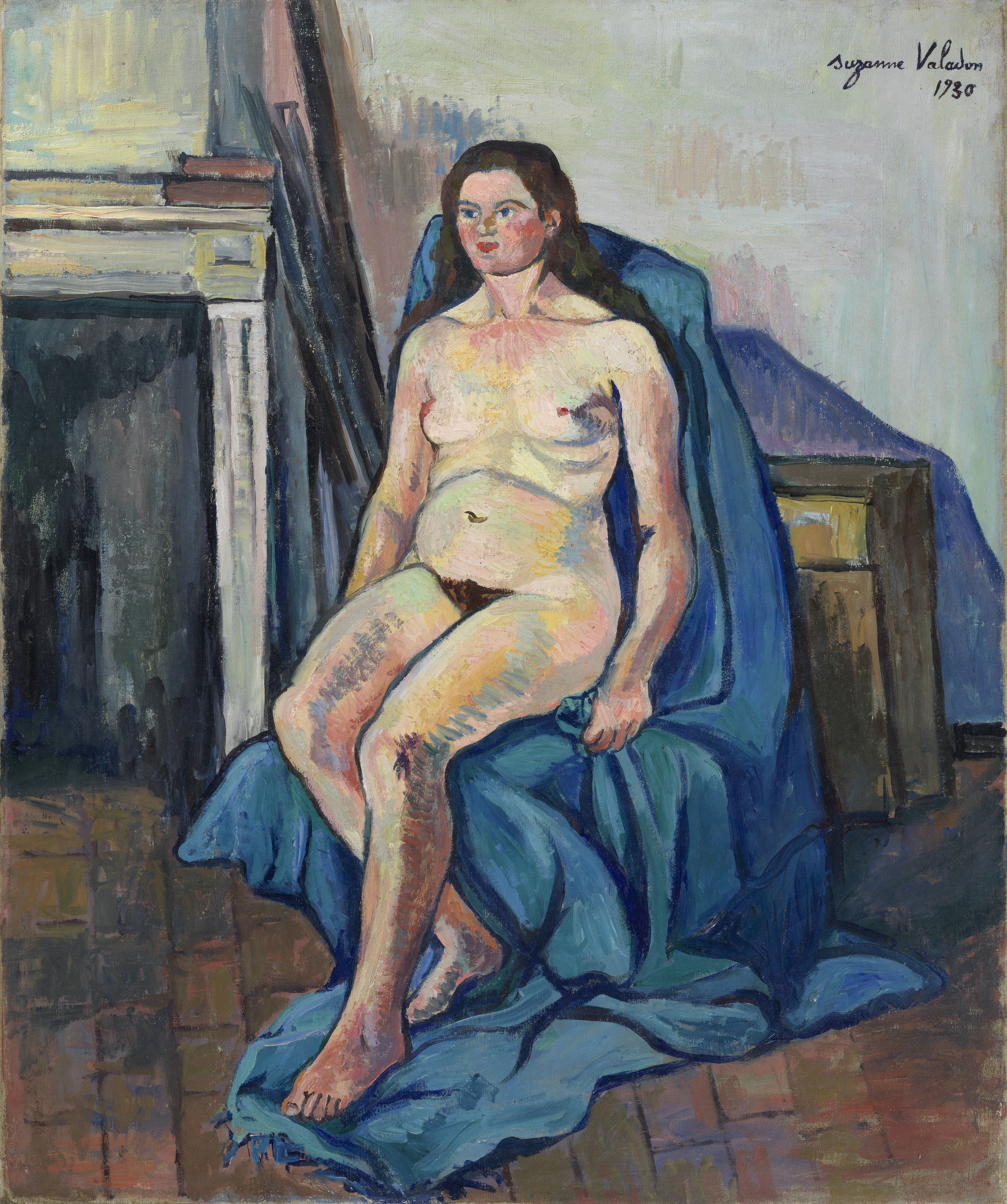
Nude Woman with a Blue Shawl (1930)

=== Portraits of Valadon ===
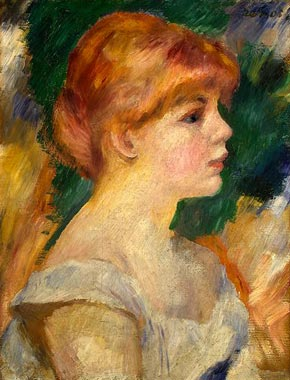
Profile portrait of Suzanne Valadon, by Pierre-Auguste Renoir, 1885

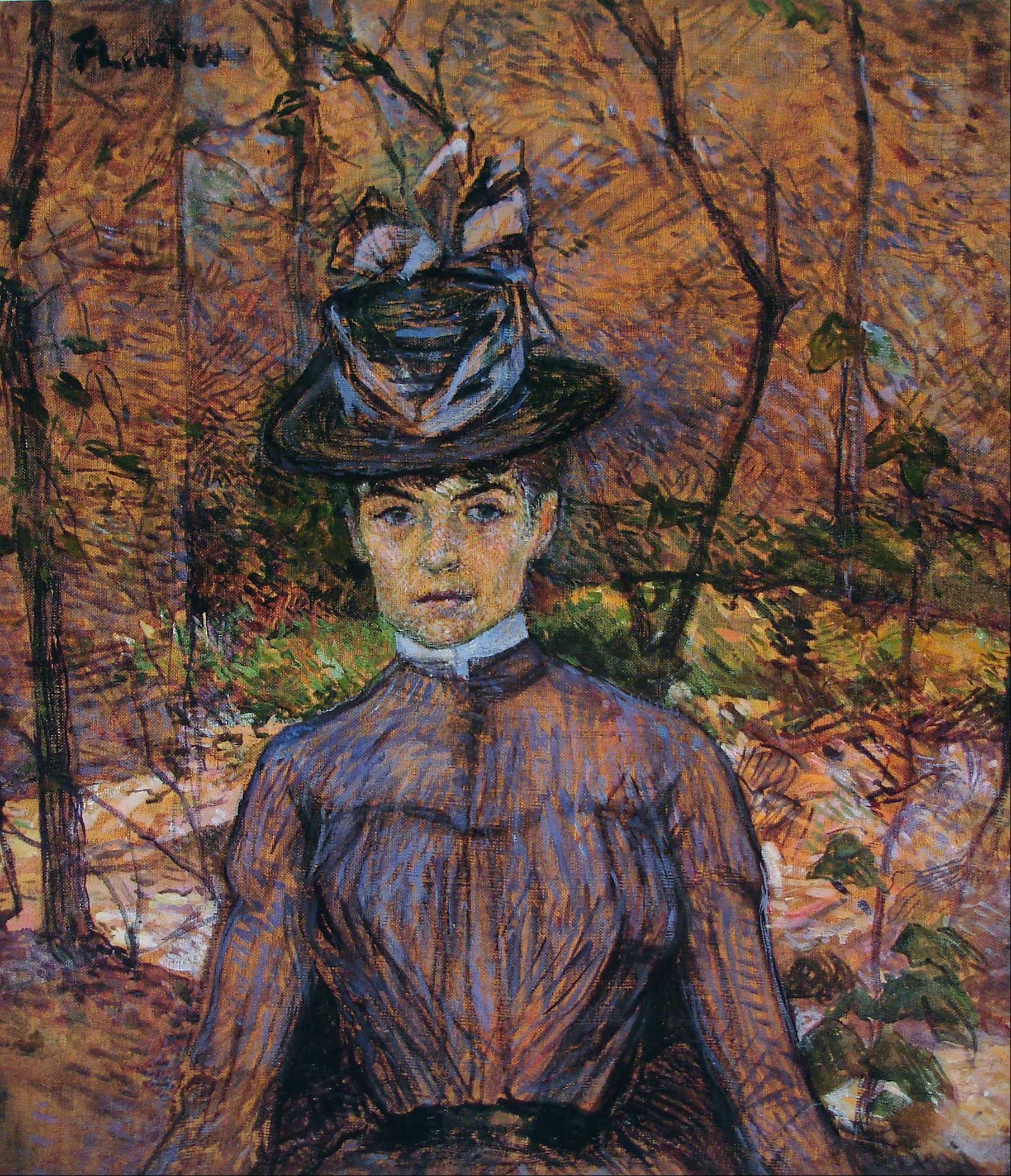
Portrait of Suzanne Valadon, by Henri de Toulouse-Lautrec, 1885

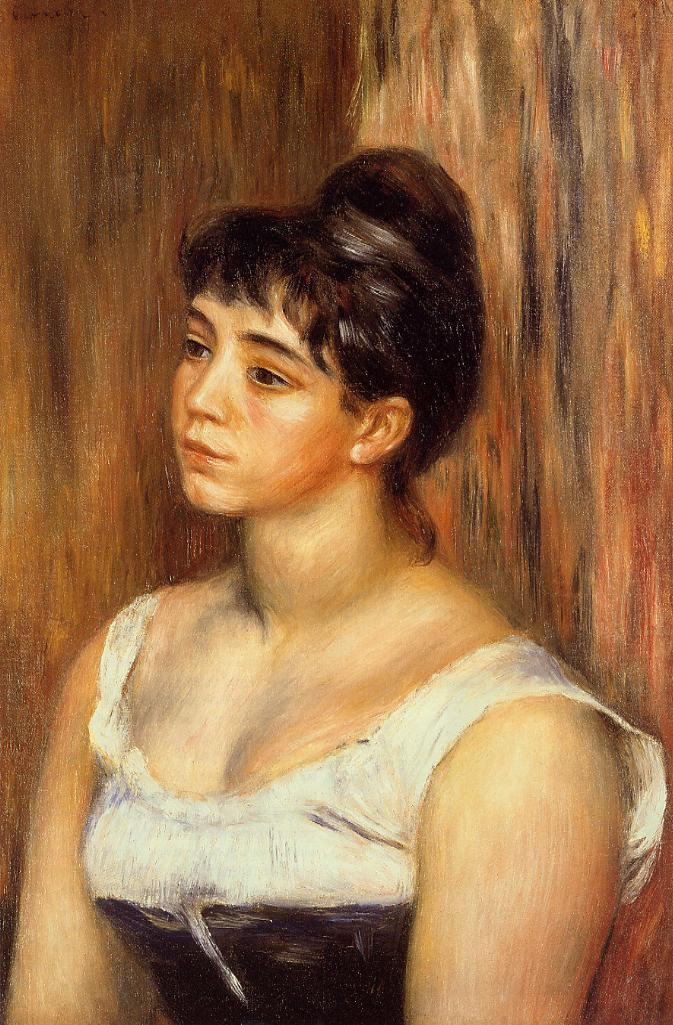
Portrait of Valadon, by Pierre-Auguste Renoir, 1885

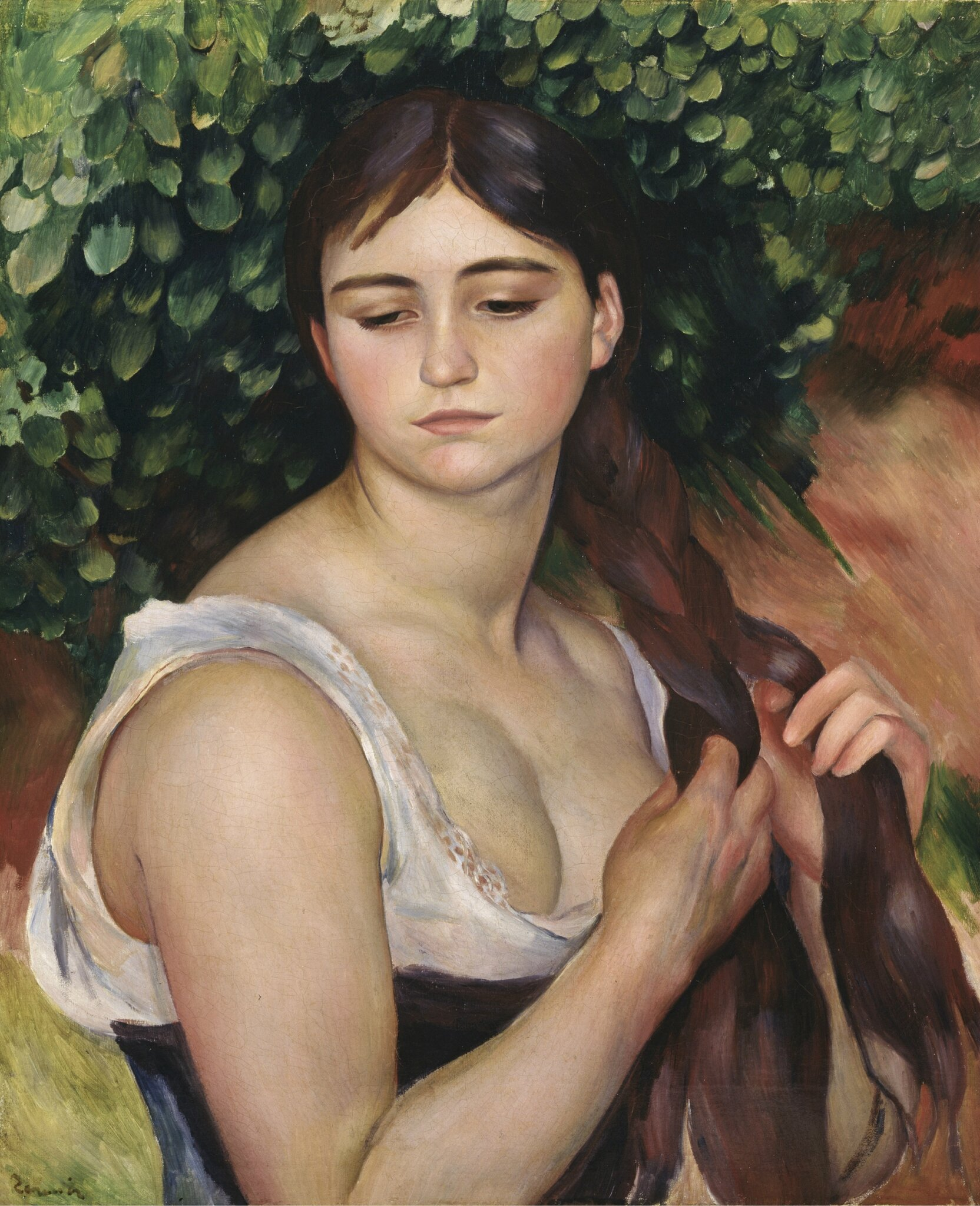
The Braid by Pierre-Auguste Renoir, 1886-1887

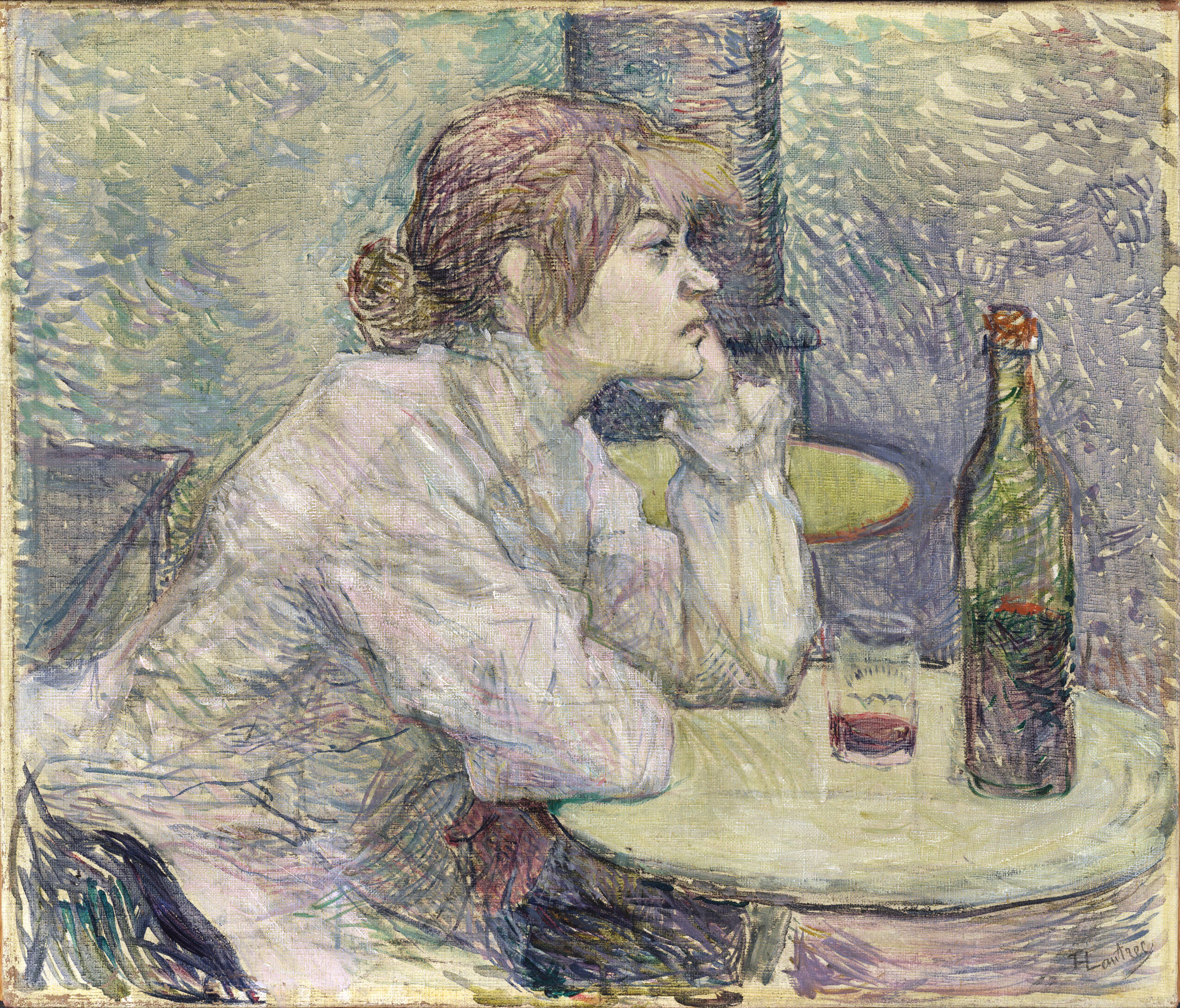
The Hangover (Suzanne Valadon), by Henri de Toulouse-Lautrec, c. 1888

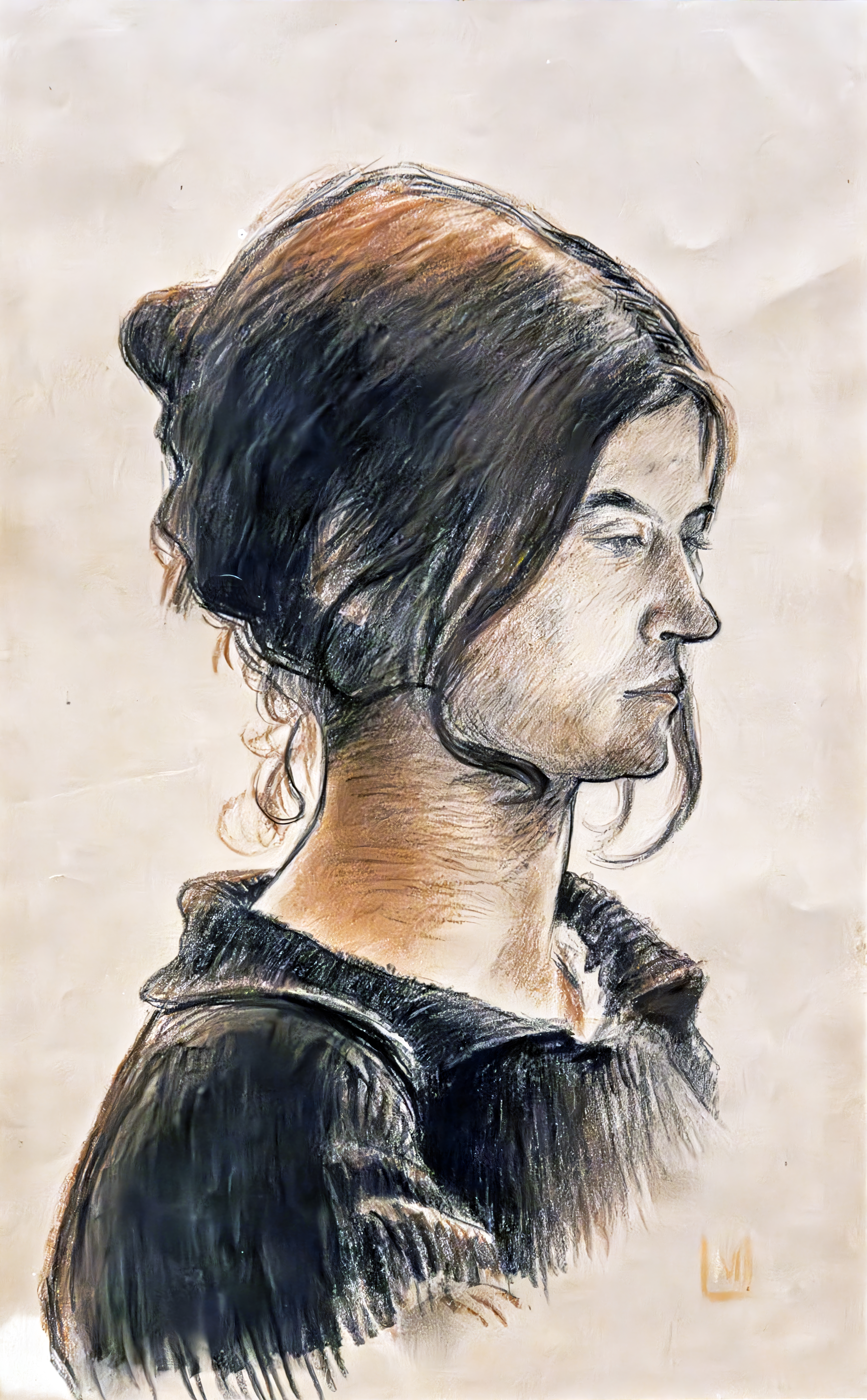
Portrait of Suzanne Valadon, by Miquel Utrillo, 1891

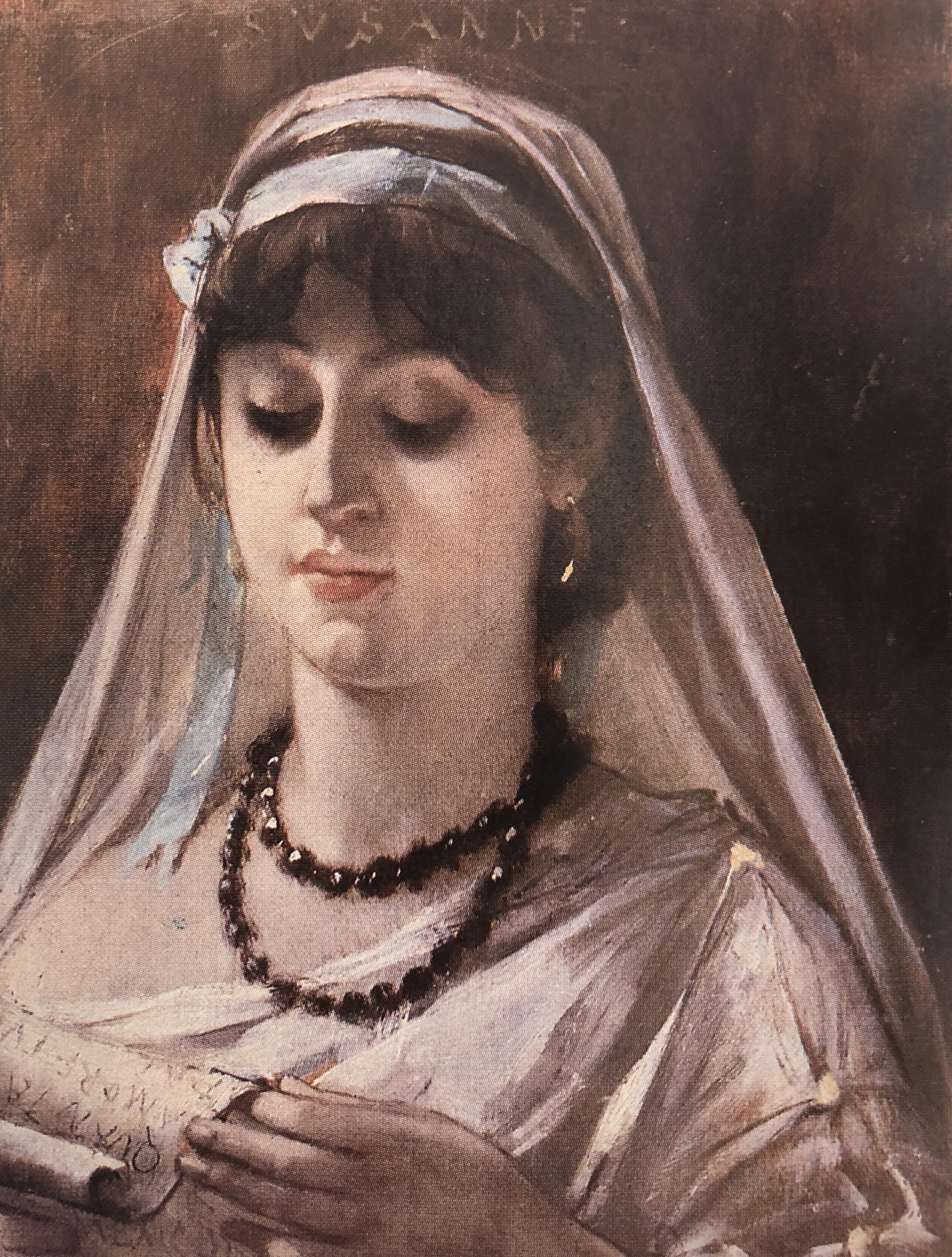
Vestal reading (study), by Hector Leroux, c. 1892

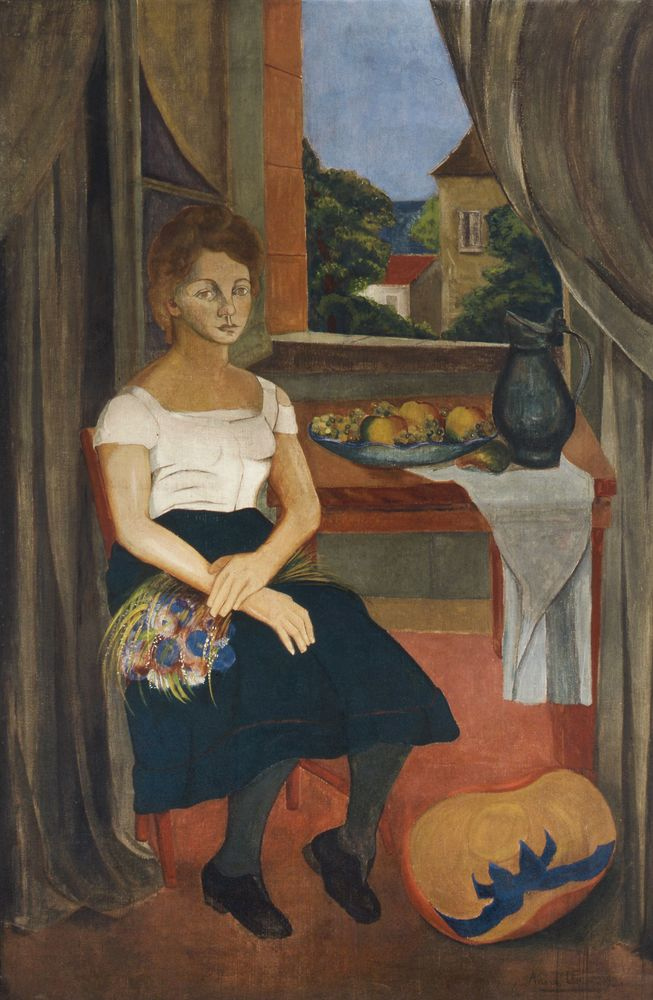
Valadon by André Utter, 1921

== Illustrations ==
- Jean Cocteau, Bertrand Guégan (1892-1943); L'almanach de Cocagne pour l'an 1920-1922, Dédié aux vrais Gourmands Et aux Francs Buveurs

== Feminist commentary ==
As one of the best documented French artists of the early twentieth century, Valadon's body of work has been of great interest to feminist art historians, especially given her focus on the female form. Her work was candid and occasionally awkward, often characterized by strong lines, and her resistance to both academic and avant-garde conventions for representing the female nude have encouraged interest in her work: It has been argued that many of her images of women signal a form of resistance to some of the dominant representations of female sexuality in early twentieth-century Western art. Many of her nudes painted from the 1910s onward are heavily proportioned and sometimes awkwardly posed. The feminist critics assert that they are conspicuously at odds with the svelte, 'feminine' type to be found in the imagery of both popular and 'high' art. Her self-portrait from 1931, when she was 66, stands out as one of the early examples of a woman painter recording her own physical decline.

Like many other talented female artists, although she is known to have been an important modern artist, Valadon never had been given a solo exhibition by a U.S. art institution. Her first institutional solo exhibition in the U.S., at the Barnes Foundation in Philadelphia, opened in September 2021.

== Honors and legacy ==
Both an asteroid (6937 Valadon) and a crater on Venus are named in her honor.

The small square at the base of the Montmartre funicular in Paris is named Place Suzanne Valadon. At the top of the funicular, and less than 50 meters to its east, are the steps named rue Maurice Utrillo after her son the artist.

=== Depiction in novels and plays ===
A novel based on the life of Suzanne Valadon was written by Elaine Todd Koren and was published in 2001, titled Suzanne: of Love and Art. An earlier novel by Sarah Baylis, Utrillo's Mother, was published first in England and later in the United States. Timberlake Wertenbaker's play, The Line (2009), traces the relationship between Valadon and Degas. Several have speculated Valadon was the basis for the character Suzanne Rouvier in the W. Somerset Maugham's 1944 novel The Razor's Edge. There were many parallels between Valadon's life and that of the Rouvier character.

Suzanne Valadon's relationships with Edgar Degas and Toulouse-Lautrec are described in R. W. Meek's two historical fiction novels, The Dream Collector, Book I: Sabrine & Sigmund Freud and The Dream Collector, Book II: Sabrine & Vincent van Gogh

== See also ==
- Musée de Montmartre, established in the building in which Valadon had an apartment and studio, which are preserved
