= Blue hall =

Blue hall could be

- Blue Hall - the main hall of the Stockholm City Hall
- Blue Hall, East Garton, a historic building in England
- Legislative Assembly of Quebec - the name of the lower house of Quebec's legislature until December 31, 1968.
