= The Blue Room (Valadon) =

1923 painting by Suzanne Valadon

- Artist: Suzanne Valadon
- Year: 1923
- Medium: oil on canvas
- Dimensions: 90 cm × 116 cm (35 in × 46 in)
- Location: Musée National d'Art Moderne, Paris

The Blue Room (La chambre bleue) is a 1923 painting by French artist Suzanne Valadon. One of her most recognizable works, it has been called a radical subversion of representation of women in art. Like many of Valadon's later works, it uses strong colors and emphasizes decorative backgrounds and patterned materials. Valadon depicts a modern 20th-century woman, clothed and smoking a cigarette, in a pose traditional to female nudes, particularly 19th-century images of odalisques and prostitutes, such as Edouard Manet's Olympia.

The painting is in the Musée National d'Art Moderne, Centre Georges Pompidou in Paris.

== Social circumstances ==
The stylistic decisions can be seen as a display of Valadon's view of society's changing social norms. The piece was created in a revolutionary time when gender roles and female independence came to the forefront of social discussion in Paris and elsewhere. After WWI, women's placement in society as objects to be escorted by men, fashioned by men, and overall constricted by men began to be replaced with a new kind of woman. Women began to make various strides in regards to fashion and social norms: wearing shorter, loose-fitting dresses, shorter bobbed hair, taking up traditionally male smoking habits, and purposefully pursuing education. Through Valadon's artistic decisions, she exemplifies the 20th-century woman as having more character unrelated to the previous male gaze. While her figure is the subject, the intimacies of her body are replaced by the intimacies of her unedited or unpolished living experience.

== Subversion of established techniques ==
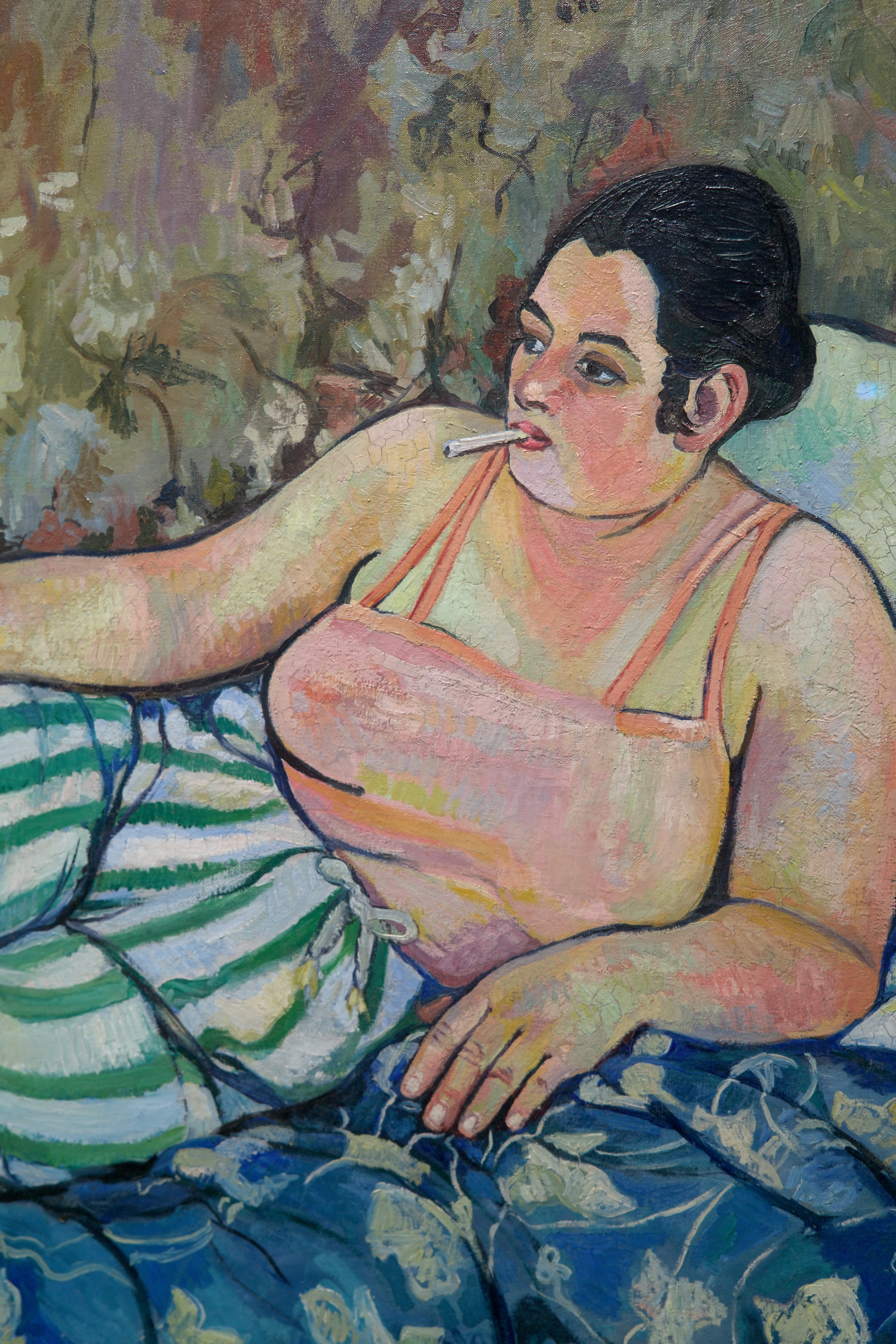
Photograph of part of Suzanne Valadon's painting: La chambre Bleue.

In contrast to Valadon's depiction of the female form, artists such as Titian, Ingres, and Manet depicted female nudes with idealized womanly features. For example, the Grande Odalisque, Olympia, and Venus of Urbino underscore a gendered role of women with full female exposures atop beds—as something separate from the model—creating an imbalanced power dynamic between the artists and subject. The Blue Room is a response to these paintings as well as others, such as Matisse's Blue Nude and Félix Vallotton's The White and the Black. Substituting a cigarette for Ingres's hookah and taking Matisse's bold outlines, among other traits from the aforementioned works, Valadon creates a "startlingly contemporary" lounger, capturing a depiction of everyday life which is entirely her own. Valadon's subversion and appropriation of her predecessor's techniques ultimately instigate a new trajectory for future depictions of the female form.

== Legacy ==
The Blue Room can be seen as the starting point for a long lasting legacy for female artists. As Janet Burns notes in Looking as Women: The Paintings of Suzanne Valadon, Paula Modersohn-Becker, and Frida Kahlo, “given the bias of western culture to fetishizing the female body, the nude is a difficult genre for women artists. It is enshrined as an icon of culture that epitomizes and objectifies female sexuality.” After Valadon, many younger, female artists were inspired by her realistic depiction of the female form through stylistic decisions and embraced the autonomy promoted by the revolutionary art style.

== See also ==
- List of paintings by Suzanne Valadon
- 1923 in art
