= List of horror films of 1961 =

A list of horror films released in 1961.

Horror films released in 1961
Title	Director	Cast	Country	Notes
The Beast of Yucca Flats	Coleman Francis	Douglas Mellor, Larry Aten, Barbara Francis	United States	
The Brainiac	Chano Urueta	Abel Salazar, Ariadne Welter, David Silvia	Mexico	
Bloodlust!	Ralph Brooke	Wilton Graff, Robert Reed, June Kenney	United States	
Creature from the Haunted Sea	Roger Corman, Monte Hellman	Roger Corman, Edward Wain, E. R. Alvarez	United States	
The Curse of the Crying Woman	Rafael Baledon	Rosita Arenas, Abel Salazar, Rita Macedo	Mexico	
The Curse of the Werewolf	Terence Fisher	Clifford Evans, Oliver Reed, Yvonne Romain	United Kingdom; United States	
Doctor Blood's Coffin	Sidney J. Furie	Hazel Court, Ian Hunter, Kieron Moore	United Kingdom; United States	
Homicidal	William Castle	Glenn Corbett, Patricia Breslin, Jean Arless	United States	
The Innocents	Jack Clayton	Deborah Kerr, Megs Jenkins, Pamela Franklin	United Kingdom	
Konga	John Lemont	Michael Gough, Margo Johns, Jess Conrad	United Kingdom; United States	
The Mask	Julian Roffman	Paul Stevens, Claudette Nevins, Anne Collings	Canada	
Mr. Sardonicus	William Castle	Guy Rolfe, Audrey Dalton, Oscar Homolka	United States	
The Pit and the Pendulum	Roger Corman	Vincent Price, John Kerr, Barbara Steele	United States	
Shadow of the Cat	John Gilling	André Morell, Barbara Shelley, William Lucas	United Kingdom; United States	
Werewolf in a Girls' Dormitory	Paolo Heusch	Barbara Lass, Carl Schell, Curt Lowens	Italy	
