= Joy of life =

Joy of life may refer to:

- Joie de vivre, a French expression

== Art ==
- Le bonheur de vivre, a 1906 painting by Henri Matisse
- Joy of Life (Valadon), a 1911 painting by Suzanne Valadon
- Joy of Life, a 1963 fountain and sculptures by T. B. Huxley-Jones

== Film and television ==
- Joy of Living, a 1938 American film directed by Tay Garnett
- The Joy of Living (film), a 1961 film directed by René Clément
- The Joy of Life, a 2005 American film
- Joys of Life, a 2012 Singaporean television series
- Joy of Life (TV series), a 2019 Chinese television series

== Music ==
- The Joy of Living (Nelson Riddle album), 1959
- The Joy of Living (Jackie Oates album), 2018
- The Joy of Living (song), a 1970 song by Cliff Richard and Hank Marvin
- "The Joy of Living", a song by Ewan MacColl
- Joy of Living: A Tribute to Ewan MacColl, a compilation and tribute album

== See also ==
- Joie de vivre (disambiguation)
