= Joy of Life (Valadon) =

Painting by Suzanne Valadon

- La Joie de vivre (French)
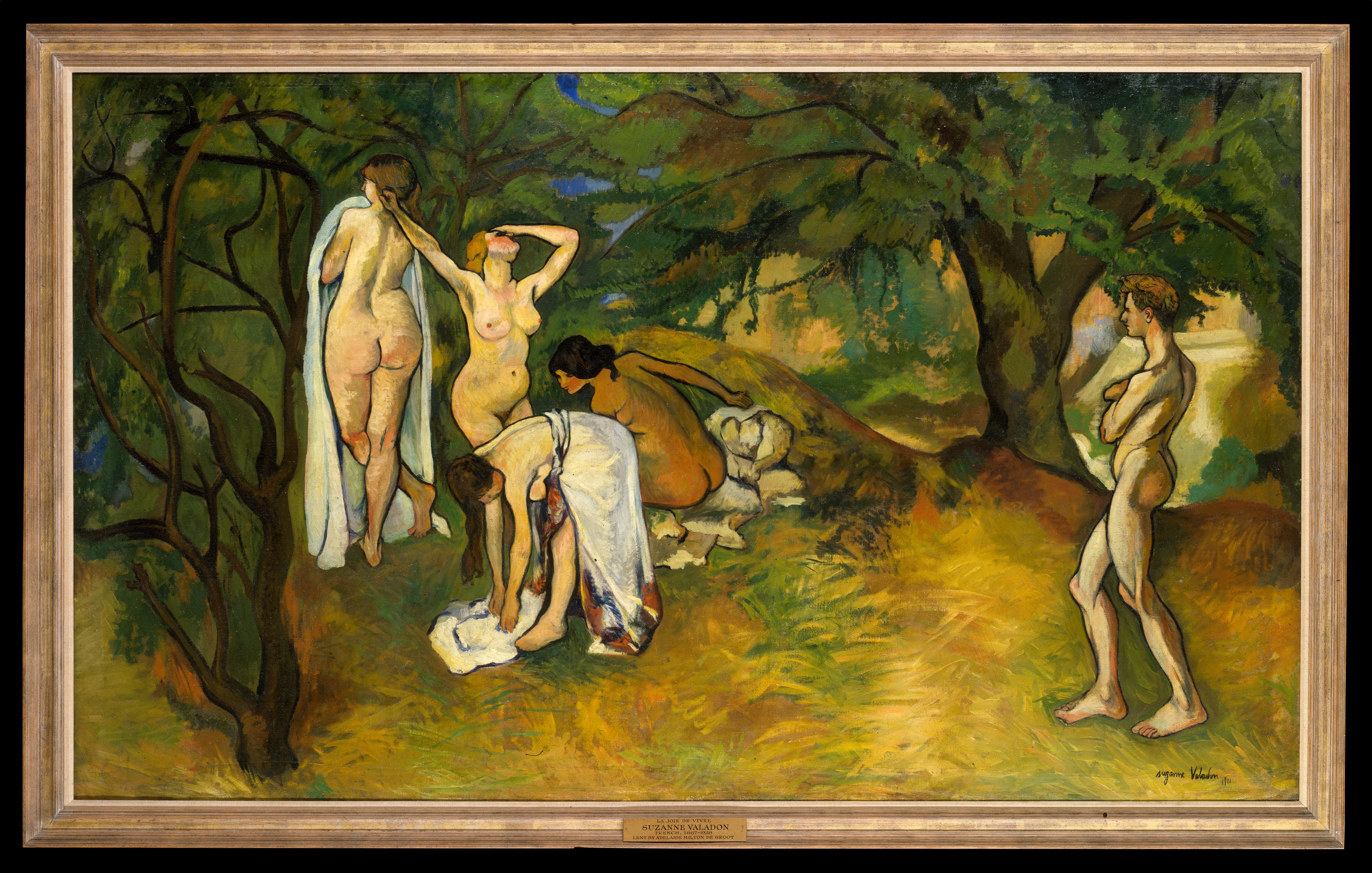
- Artist: Suzanne Valadon
- Year: 1911
- Medium: Oil on canvas
- Dimensions: 122.9 cm × 205.7 cm (46 3/8 in × 81 in)
- Location: Metropolitan Museum of Art, New York
- Accession: 67.187.113

Joy of Life (La Joie de vivre) is an oil painting by Suzanne Valadon, completed in 1911. It was bequeathed to the Metropolitan Museum of Art, in New York, in 1967.

== Description and interpretation ==
Suzanne Valadon's Joy of Life depicts a landscape with four nude and seminude women who are watched by a nude man. The nude male was modeled by Valadon's lover, André Utter. They met through her son, Maurice Utrillo, and Utter modeled nude for several of Valadon's paintings, including Adam and Eve (1909) and Casting the Net (1914).

Joy of Life is based on the theme of "women as nature", a typical subject at the time. Gill Perry has argued that the painting reworks the theme of bathers in nature. She notes that the women "seem strangely separate from each other, the male viewer and from the nature that surrounds them", which suggests a "more ambiguous, dislocated relationship with both nature and the male spectator". There is a certain disconnection between the male viewer and the nude women as they seem startled to notice him. Perry's reading is echoed by Patricia Mathews, who has described the figures as being in nature, but not equivalent to nature. She suggests that the male viewer "has no other role in the painting except as this near-caricature of the dominating male gaze", as the women are unaware of being watched.

Rosemary Betterton has argued that the figures disrupt the male gaze and are, in fact, being caught in a moment without being sexualized. According to Mathews, the painting does not offer the "coherent narrative that so clearly dominated masculinist images". Valadon's Joy of Life, Mathews has noted, is consistent with the ways in which "various narratives intersect in her work in often uncomfortable ways to dislodge and destabilize conventional gendered interpretations".

In Casting the Net, completed three years later, Valadon actually reversed the traditional active male/passive female concept by casting the nude male in the role of object.

== See also ==
- List of paintings by Suzanne Valadon
