= Joie de vivre (disambiguation) =

Joie de vivre is a French phrase meaning "joy of living".

Joie de vivre may also refer to:

- Joie de vivre (album), by French singer Louane
- Joie De Vivre (band), an American emo band
- Joie de Vivre (di Suvero), a sculpture by Mark di Suvero in Manhattan
- Joie de Vivre (horse), a racehorse
- Joie de Vivre Hospitality, an American hospitality company
- Joie de vivre (film), a documentary about Bernardo Bertolucci

== See also ==
- The Joy of Living (film) (French: Quelle joie de vivre), an Italian-French film
- Joy of life (disambiguation)
