= Casting the Net =

Painting by Suzanne Valadon

- Le Lancement du filet (French)
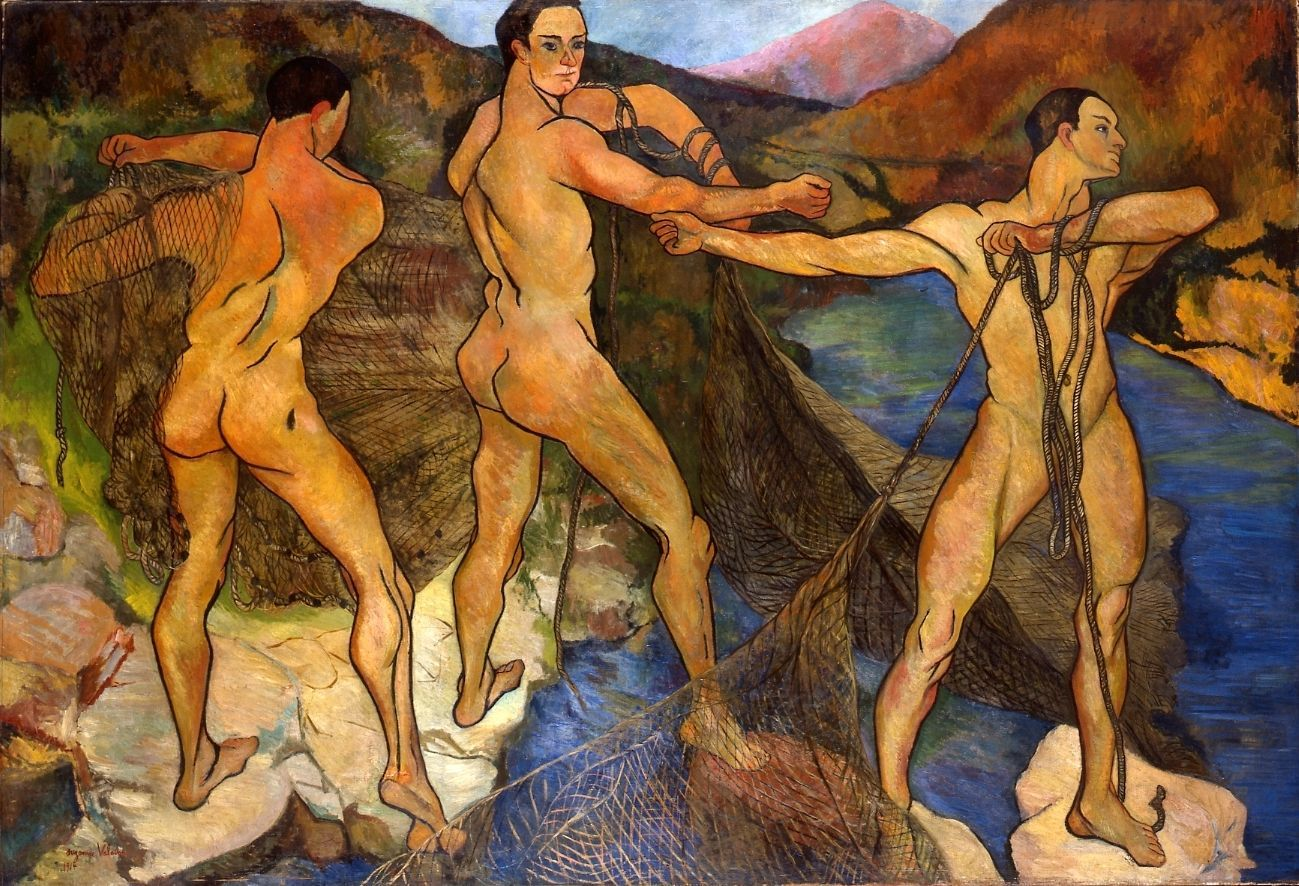
- Artist: Suzanne Valadon
- Year: 1914
- Medium: Oil on canvas
- Dimensions: 201 cm × 301 cm (79 in × 119 in)
- Location: Museum of Fine Arts, Nancy

Casting the Net is an oil-on-canvas painting by French artist Suzanne Valadon, executed in 1914. It has the dimensions of 201 by 301 cm. It is held in the collection of the Museum of Fine Arts in Nancy.

== History and analysis ==
The painting was executed in 1914 and exhibited from March 1 to April 30, 1914, at the Salon des Indépendants. Valadon's son, the painter Maurice Utrillo, and her lover and model for this painting, André Utter, also exhibited there. During this exhibition, the canvas did not go unnoticed for its size and was subjected to some criticism. The Swiss writer and artist Arthur Cravan (known for scandalous outrageousness) subjected the picture and the artist herself to fierce criticism: “[she] knows all sorts of tricks well, but simplifying does not mean doing it in a simple way, old bitch!”. He was convicted of libel, and he later wrote: "Contrary to my assertion, Madame Suzanne Valadon is virtue itself".

Valadon was infatuated with the young artist André Utter, a friend of her son who was 25 years younger than Valadon, and who became her lover. They got married in 1914, when the painting was made. It is Utter who is depicted on the canvas, as a naked man, standing in three different poses and who reproduces the same gesture in each of them. He embodies youth; the canvas emphasizes the power of the model, in the action of casting a fishing net. The net actually serves as a pretext for depicting his naked body tense with effort. In the first two positions, the man leans on his left leg. The model's athletic body further enhances the erotic nature of the composition.

The canvas represents a classical composition on an academic theme and has a geometric design. This study of movement is reminiscent of the painting Dance (1910) by Henri Matisse (Hermitage Museum, Saint Petersburg). The pink mountain and the blue lake were inspired by the artist's stay in Corsica and are also reminiscent of Paul Cézanne's tones.

The artist uses outline, clearly delineating the silhouette of the model in space, a technique previously used, among others, by Edgar Degas and Henri de Toulouse-Lautrec. The colors of the painting are warm and sensual.

This is also the last painting where Valadon depicted a male nude. Subsequently, she became more interested in female and child nudes. Valadon was perceived as a symbol of a liberated and active woman, depicting a man as an object of desire. She breaks with the bourgeois conventions of her time by marrying a younger man and by depicting the male nude in her work.

== Provenance ==
The work was purchased from Madame Vigneron, who received it from the artist herself. The canvas was acquired by the Musée National d'Art Moderne in Paris in 1937, and in 1998 it was transferred to the Museum of Fine Arts of Nancy, for safekeeping.

== See also ==
- List of paintings by Suzanne Valadon
