= Karlheinz Böhm =

Austrian-German actor and philanthropist (1928–2014)

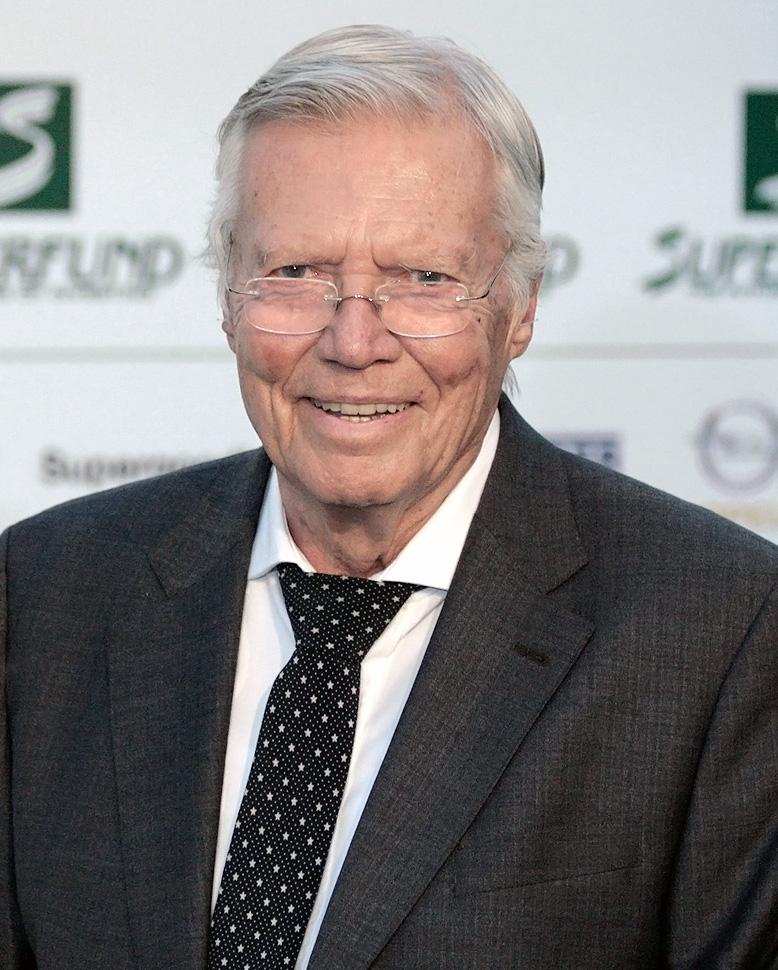
- Böhm in 2009
- Born: 16 March 1928; Darmstadt, Hesse-Nassau, Germany
- Died: 29 May 2014 (aged 86); Grödig, Salzburg, Austria
- Other names: Karl Boehm; Carl Boehm
- Occupation: Actor
- Years active: 1948–2014
- Spouses: Elisabeth Zonewa (m. 1954; div. 1957) Gudula Blau (m. 1958; div. 1962) Barbara Lass (m. 1963; div. 1980) Almaz Böhm (m. 1991)
- Children: 7; including Katharina
- Parents: Karl Böhm (father); Thea Linhard (mother)

Karlheinz Böhm (16 March 1928 – 29 May 2014) was a German-born Austrian actor and philanthropist. He took part in 45 films and became well known in Austria and Germany for his role as Emperor Franz Joseph I of Austria in the Sissi film trilogy and internationally for his role as Mark Lewis, the psychopathic protagonist of Peeping Tom, directed by Michael Powell. He was the founder of the trust Menschen für Menschen (“Humans for Humans”), which helps people in need in Ethiopia. He also received honorary Ethiopian citizenship in 2003.

== Early life ==
Böhm was born on 16 March 1928 in Darmstadt, Germany, the son of Austrian conductor Karl Böhm and German soprano Thea Linhard. He was an only child, and spent his youth in Darmstadt, Hamburg and Dresden. In Hamburg he attended elementary school at the Kepler-Gymnasium (a grammar school). Faked papers (claiming he had a lung disease) enabled him to emigrate to Switzerland in 1939, just around the beginning of World War II, where he attended the Lyceum Alpinum Zuoz, a boarding school. In 1946, he moved to Graz with his parents, where he graduated from high school the same year. He originally intended to become a pianist but received poor feedback when he auditioned. His father urged him to study English and German language and literary studies, followed by studies of history of arts for one semester in Rome after which he quit and returned to Vienna to take acting lessons with Prof. Helmuth Krauss.

== Acting career ==
From 1948 to 1976 Böhm acted in about 45 films and also in theatre. With Romy Schneider, he starred in Sissi (1955), the first of a film trilogy, as Emperor Franz Joseph, with Schneider as his wife, Empress Elisabeth of Austria. The role for a time limited him to one specific genre as an actor, but Böhm's best known English language film was a dramatic change of image. In Peeping Tom (1960) he played the psychopath Mark Lewis. Director Michael Powell cast him in the role because he felt Böhm might understand the character's experience of having an overbearing father. The film's initial rejection hurt both the actor and Powell, for Powell professionally as well as emotionally, but it is now regarded by some as a classic. One unusual aspect of the casting is that Böhm displayed a significant German accent throughout the movie, though the character had been born and raised in England to, probably, an English father, as played for short bits by Powell without an accent.

Briefly, in the early 1960s, Böhm worked in the American film and television industry. He played Jakob Grimm in the MGM-Cinerama spectacular The Wonderful World of the Brothers Grimm and Ludwig van Beethoven in the Walt Disney film The Magnificent Rebel. The latter film was made especially for Walt Disney's Wonderful World of Color television anthology series, but it was released theatrically in Europe. He appeared in a villainous role as the Nazi-sympathizing son of Paul Lukas in the MGM film Four Horsemen of the Apocalypse (all 1962), a remake of the 1921 silent Rudolph Valentino film.

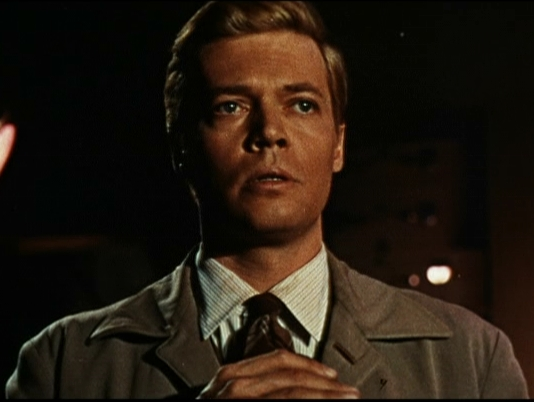
Karlheinz Böhm in Peeping Tom 1960

During 1974 and 1975, Böhm appeared prominently in four consecutive films from prolific New German Cinema director Rainer Werner Fassbinder: Martha, Effi Briest, Faustrecht der Freiheit (Fox and His Friends), and Mutter Küsters' Fahrt zum Himmel (Mother Küsters' Trip to Heaven).

Böhm's voice acting work included narrating his father's 1975 recording of Peter and the Wolf by Sergei Prokofiev and in 2009 providing the German voice for Charles Muntz, villain in Pixar's tenth animated feature Up.

== Charitable work ==
On the ZDF show Wetten, dass..? in 1981 Böhm raised 1.2 million Deutsche Mark for people in Africa. He bet that "not every third viewer would donate one Mark, one Swiss franc or seven Austrian schillings for needy people in the Sahel zone". In November 1981, Böhm founded Menschen für Menschen (Humans for Humans) and involved in charitable work in Ethiopia. He largely retired from acting in the 1980s for his project. Until today, Menschen für Menschen built over 400 schools, 2000 fountains and over 5 million people benefit from their work.

Böhm received honorary Ethiopian citizenship in 2003. In 2007 he was awarded the Balzan Prize for Humanity, Peace and Brotherhood among Peoples. In 2011 Karlheinz Böhm and his wife Almaz were awarded the Essl Social Prize for the project Menschen für Menschen.

== Personal life ==
Böhm's first wife was Elisabeth Zonewa. The marriage lasted from 1954 to 1957 and resulted in the birth of his daughter Sissy. In her autobiography Sissy Böhm would later accuse her by-then-deceased parents of child molestation.

Böhm was married from 1958 to 1962 to Gudula Blau, and next from 1963 to 1980 to Polish actress Barbara Kwiatkowska-Lass. His fourth and last marriage was with Almaz Böhm (born 1964), a native of Ethiopia, in 1991. They had two children, Nicolas (born 1990) and Aida (born 1993). Böhm had five more children from previous marriages, among them the actress Katharina Böhm (born 1964). In February 2013 it was reported that he was suffering from Alzheimer's disease, he lived in Grödig near Salzburg until his death in May 2014.

== Filmography ==
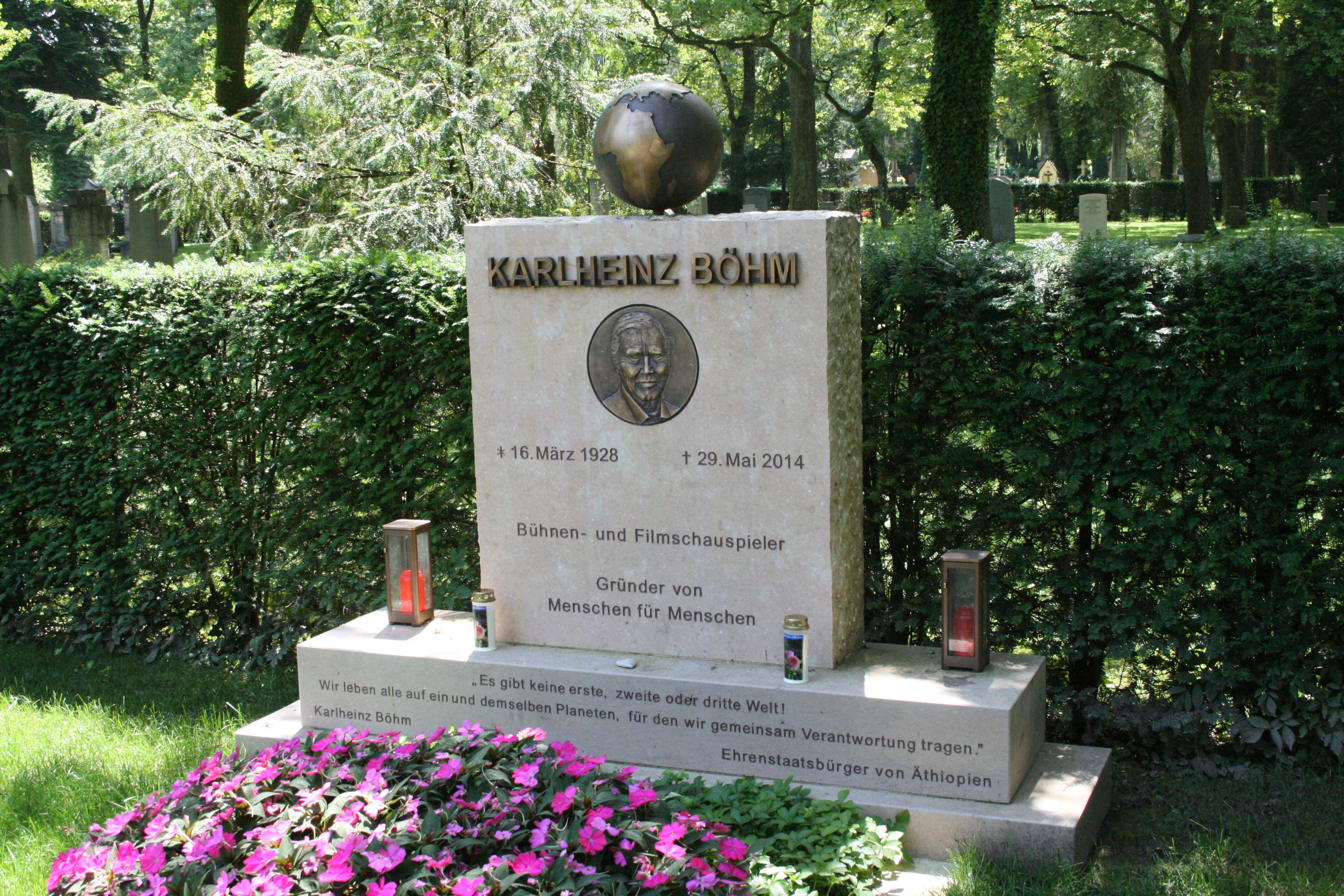
Grave of Karlheinz Böhm in Salzburg

- The Angel with the Trumpet (1948) as Franz Alt jr.
- Höllische Liebe (1949) as Flower Delivery Man
- The Day Before the Wedding (1952) as Walter
- House of Life (1952) as Pit Harlacher
- Alraune (1952) as Frank Braun
- The Exchange (1952) as Lorenz Holler
- Salto Mortale (1953) as Manfred
- Arlette Conquers Paris (1953) as Gérard Laurent
- The Immortal Vagabond (1953) as Johannes Ritter/Petroni
- Wedding in Transit (1953) as Dr. Walter Delius
- The Sun of St. Moritz (1954) as Dr. Robert Frank
- Sacred Lie (1954) as Peter Weiland
- Love is Forever (1954) as Georg
- The Witch (1954) as Graf Ulrich Ziszek-Wald
- The Golden Plague (1954) as Karl Hellmer
- I Was an Ugly Girl (1955) as Thomas von Bley
- Operation Sleeping Bag (1955) as Kanonier Gravenhorst
- Swedish Girl (1955) as Klaus Richter
- Sissi (1955) as Emperor Franz Joseph
- Dunja (1955) as Mitja
- The Marriage of Doctor Danwitz (1956) as Dr. med. Danwitz
- Kitty and the Great Big World (1956) as Robert Ashlin
- Nina (1956) as Frank Wilson
- Sissi – The Young Empress (1956) as Emperor Franz Josef
- Seamen (1957) as Kapitänleutnant Alfred Hanstein
- Das Schloß in Tirol (1957) as Thomas Stegmann
- Sissi – Fateful Years of an Empress (1957) as Emperor Franz Josef
- Examen des Lebens (1958, TV film) as Paul Gardiner
- The Stowaway (1958) as Jean
- One Should Be Twenty Again (1958) as Dr. Paul Degenhard
- That Won't Keep a Sailor Down (1958) as Peter Hille
- The House of Three Girls (1958) as Franz Schubert
- Court Martial (1959) as Oberleutnant Düren
- La Paloma (1959) as Robert Dahlberg
- Peeping Tom (1960) as Mark Lewis
- Too Hot to Handle (1960) as Robert Jouvel
- Crook and the Cross (1960) as Pater Steiner
- The Magnificent Rebel (1961) as Ludwig van Beethoven
- Four Horsemen of the Apocalypse (1962) as Heinrich von Hartrott
- Cross of the Living (1962) as Gus
- The Wonderful World of the Brothers Grimm (1962) as Jacob Grimm
- Come Fly with Me (1963) as Baron Franz von Elzingen
- Rififi in Tokyo (1963) as Carl Mersen
- The Hour of Truth (1965) as Jonathan
- The Venetian Affair (1966) as Robert Wahl
- An Ideal Husband (1966, TV Movie) as Lord Goring
- Traumnovelle (1969, TV Movie) as Fridolin
- Verdacht gegen Barry Croft (1972, TV Movie) as Barry Croft
- Hubertus Castle (1973) as Tassilo
- Martha (1974) as Helmut Salomon
- Effi Briest (1974) as Wüllersdorf
- Fox and His Friends (1975) as Max
- Mother Küsters' Trip to Heaven (1975) as Karl Tillmann
- Ringstraßenpalais (1983, TV Series) as Bernie Artenberg
- Up (2009) as Charles F. Muntz (voice, German version)
