= Karl Böhm =

Austrian conductor (1894–1981)

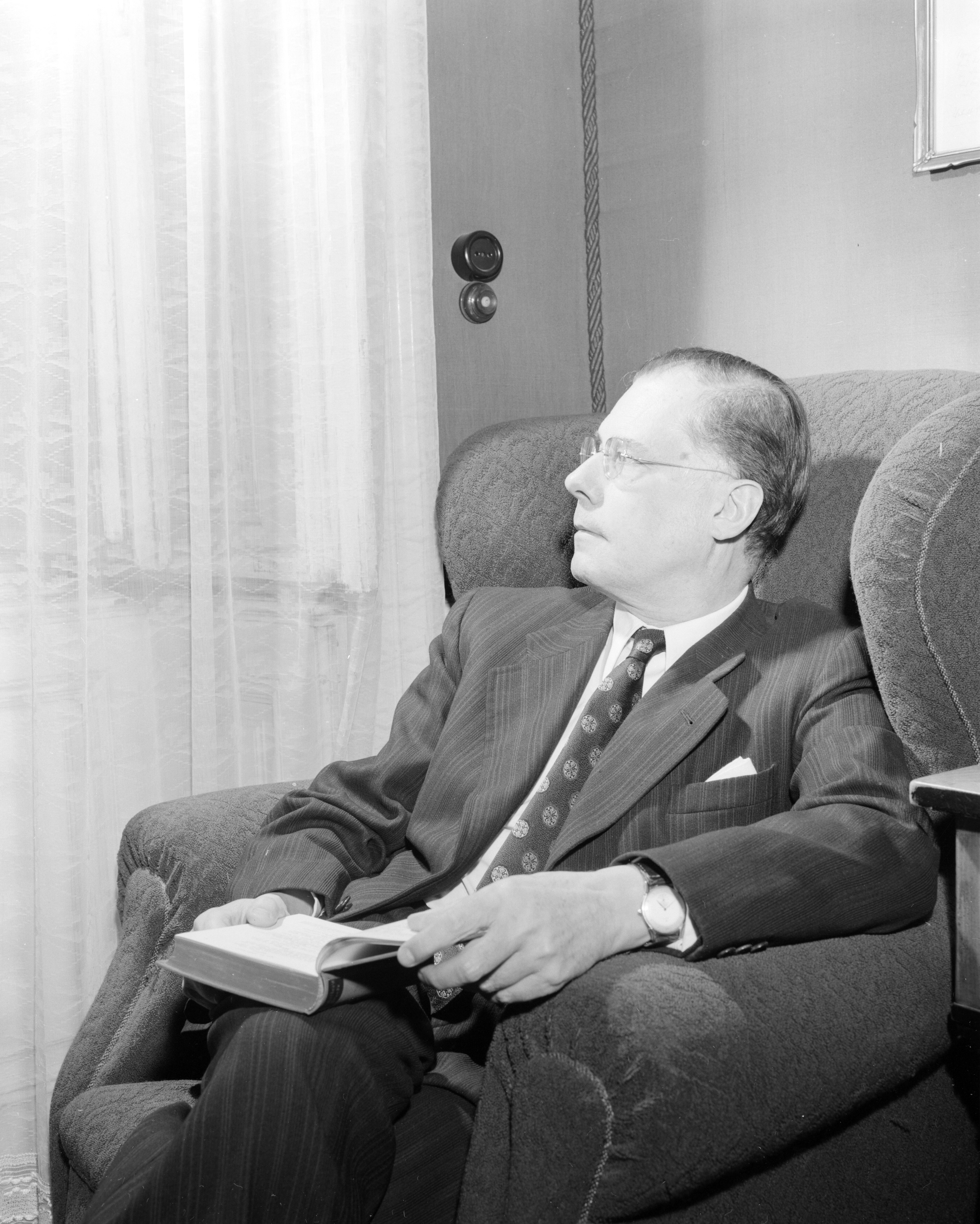
- Photo from the 1950s
- Born: 28 August 1894; Graz, Austria-Hungary
- Died: 14 August 1981 (aged 86); Salzburg, Austria
- Occupation: Conductor
- Spouse: Thea Linhard
- Children: Karlheinz Böhm
- Relatives: Katharina Böhm (granddaughter)

Signature
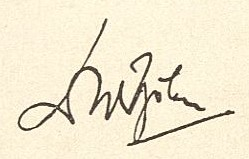

Karl August Leopold Böhm (28 August 1894 – 14 August 1981) was an Austrian conductor. He was best known for his performances of the music of Mozart, Beethoven, Wagner, and Richard Strauss.

== Life and career ==
=== Education ===
Karl Böhm was born in Graz, Styria, Austria. The son of a lawyer, he studied law and earned a doctorate in this subject before entering the music conservatory in his home town of Graz. He later enrolled at the Vienna Conservatory, where he studied under Eusebius Mandyczewski, a friend of Johannes Brahms.

=== Munich, Darmstadt, Hamburg ===
In 1917, Böhm became a rehearsal assistant in his home town, making his debut as a conductor in Viktor Nessler's Der Trompeter von Säckingen in 1917. He became the assistant director of music in 1919, and the following year, the senior director. On the recommendation of Karl Muck, Bruno Walter engaged him at the Bavarian State Opera, Munich in 1921. An early assignment here was Mozart's Die Entführung aus dem Serail, with a cast which included Maria Ivogün, Paul Bender, and Richard Tauber. In 1927, Böhm was appointed as chief musical director in Darmstadt. In 1931, he was appointed to the same post at the Hamburg State Opera, a position he held until 1934.

=== Vienna, Dresden, Salzburg ===
External audio
- You may hear Karl Böhm conducting Ludwig van Beethoven's Piano Concerto No. 4 in G major, Op. 58 with Walter Gieseking and the Saxon State Orchestra in 1939 Here on archive.org

In 1933, Böhm conducted in Vienna for the first time, in Tristan und Isolde by Wagner. In 1934, he succeeded Fritz Busch, who had gone into exile, as head of Dresden's Semper Opera remaining there until 1942. This was an important period for him, in which he conducted the first performances of works by Richard Strauss: Die schweigsame Frau (1935) and Daphne (1938), which is dedicated to him. He also conducted the first performances of Romeo und Julia (1940) and Die Zauberinsel (1942) by Heinrich Sutermeister, and Strauss's Horn Concerto No. 2 (1943).

Böhm first appeared at the Salzburg Festival in 1938, conducting Don Giovanni, and thereafter he became a permanent guest conductor. He secured a top post at the Vienna State Opera in 1943, eventually becoming music director. On the occasion of the 80th birthday of Richard Strauss, on 11 June 1944, he conducted the Vienna State Opera performance of Ariadne auf Naxos.

=== After World War II ===
After he had completed a two-year post-war denazification ban, Böhm led Don Giovanni at La Scala, Milan (1948) and gave a guest performance in Paris with the Vienna State Opera company (1949). From 1950 to 1953 he directed the German season at the Teatro Colón in Buenos Aires, and he conducted the first performance in Spanish of Wozzeck by Alban Berg, translated for the occasion. In 1953 he was responsible for the first performance of Gottfried von Einem's work Der Prozess. From 1954 to 1956 he directed the Vienna State Opera at its reconstructed home. He additionally resumed ties post-war in Dresden, at the Staatskapelle.

=== Success in New York ===
In 1957, Böhm made his debut with the Metropolitan Opera in New York, conducting Don Giovanni, and quickly became one of the favorite conductors of Rudolf Bing's tenure at the Met, conducting 262 performances there, including the Met premieres of Wozzeck, Ariadne auf Naxos and Die Frau ohne Schatten, which was the first major success in the Met's new house at Lincoln Center in 1966. Böhm led many other major new productions in New York, including Fidelio for the 1970 Beethoven bicentennial, Tristan und Isolde (including the Met debut performance of Birgit Nilsson in 1959), Lohengrin, Otello, Der Rosenkavalier, Salome, and Elektra. His repertoire there also included Le nozze di Figaro, Parsifal, Der fliegende Holländer, Die Walküre, and Die Meistersinger von Nürnberg.

=== Bayreuth and Wagner ===
Böhm made his debut at the Bayreuth Festival in 1962 with Tristan and Isolde, which he conducted until 1970. In 1964, he led Wagner's Die Meistersinger von Nürnberg there, and from 1965 to 1967 the composer's Der Ring des Nibelungen cycle, which was the last production by Wieland Wagner. His Wagner conducting divided opinion; the recording producer John Culshaw wrote that Böhm's 1966 Walküre "was conducted with a stupefying indifference, as if the conductor could not wait to get back to Salzburg or wherever he was going for his next engagement”, but Grove's Dictionary of Music and Musicians praises Böhm's Bayreuth performances for "finely display[ing] his qualities". The Times took a middle view, finding his Wagner "light and positive" but "somewhat reluctant to let the drama find its full weight and depth". Performances of the Ring and Tristan were recorded live and issued on record. In 1971 he conducted Wagner's The Flying Dutchman at Bayreuth.

=== Indian summer in London ===
Late in life, he began a guest-conducting relationship with the London Symphony Orchestra (LSO) in a 1973 appearance at the Salzburg Festival. Several recordings were made with the orchestra for Deutsche Grammophon. Böhm was given the title of LSO President, which he held until his death. He twice conducted at the Royal Opera House, Covent Garden in the 1970s: Le nozze di Figaro in 1977 and Così fan tutte in 1979.

=== Death, family, legacy ===
Böhm died in Salzburg, at age 86. He conducted the premieres of Strauss's late works Die schweigsame Frau (1935) and Daphne (1938), of which he is the dedicatee, recorded all the major operas (but often made cuts to the scores), and regularly revived Strauss's operas with strong casts during his tenures in Vienna and Dresden, as well as at the Salzburg Festival.

Böhm was praised for his rhythmically robust interpretations of the operas and symphonies of Mozart, and in the 1960s he was entrusted with recording all the Mozart symphonies with the Berlin Philharmonic. His brisk, straightforward approach to Wagner won adherents, as did his readings of the symphonies of Brahms, Bruckner, and Schubert. His complete recordings of the Beethoven symphonies with the Vienna Philharmonic in 1971 was also highly regarded. On a less common front, he championed and recorded Alban Berg's avant-garde operas Wozzeck and Lulu before they gained a foothold in the standard repertory. Böhm mentioned in the notes to his recordings of these works that he and Berg discussed the orchestrations, leading to changes in the score (as he had similarly done, previously, with Richard Strauss). He was described by one critic as one of the greatest conductors of the 20th century. Grove says of him:

Mozart, Wagner and Richard Strauss are the composers with whom his name is most closely associated, followed by Haydn, Beethoven, Schubert, Bruckner, Brahms and Berg. Böhm’s musical approach, expressed in strictly functional gestures, was direct, fresh, energetic and authoritative, avoiding touches of romantic sentimentality or self-indulgent virtuoso mannerisms ... He was widely admired for his skilful balance and blend of sound, his feeling for a stable tempo and his sense of dramatic tension.

He received two exclusive titles: "Ehrendirigent" of the Vienna Philharmonic and Austrian "Generalmusikdirektor". He was widely fêted on his 80th birthday ten years later; his colleague Herbert von Karajan presented him with a clock to mark that occasion.

Böhm was married to the soprano Thea Linhard. His son Karlheinz Böhm was a successful actor.

=== Nazi sympathies ===
Although Böhm never joined the Nazi Party, in public and in private he continually expressed strong support for Hitler and his regime. The extent to which this was a matter of conviction rather than careerism is uncertain and the subject of much speculation. Böhm's son maintained that his father was warned that if he defected from Nazi Germany, every member of his family would be sent to a concentration camp, but Böhm's support of the Nazis predated their rise to power. The historian Michael H. Kater records that while Böhm was music director in Dresden (1934–43) he "poured forth rhetoric glorifying the Nazi regime and their cultural aims". Kater ranks Böhm in that group of artists in whom "we also find conflicting elements of resistance, accommodation, and service to the regime, so that in the end they cannot be definitively painted as either Nazis or non-Nazis." Kater also argues that Böhm's move to the Dresden Opera in 1934, where he replaced Fritz Busch after the latter's "politically motivated" dismissal by Nazi authorities, as evidence of Böhm's "extreme careerist opportunism at the expense of personal morality" and was facilitated directly by Hitler, who obtained an early release for Böhm from his previous contract. Kater contrasts this conduct with Böhm's "aesthetically faultless and sometimes politically daring" choice of repertory, and his collaborations with anti-Nazi directors and designers, which "could have been interpreted by enemies of the Nazi regime as a brave attempt to preserve the principle of artistic freedom". In 2015, the Salzburg Festival announced that it would affix a plaque in its Karl Böhm refreshment lobby (Karl-Böhm-Saal) acknowledging the conductor's complicity with Nazi Germany: "Böhm was a beneficiary of the Third Reich and used its system to advance his career. His ascent was facilitated by the expulsion of Jewish and politically out-of-favor colleagues". (Note: "Böhm war ein Profiteur des Dritten Reichs und arrangierte sich für die Karriere mit dem System. Sein Aufstieg wurde durch die Vertreibung jüdischer und politisch missliebiger Kollegen begünstigt".)

== Recordings ==
Böhm recorded extensively for Deutsche Grammophon, but also made recordings with Decca and EMI. He is primarily known for his recordings of Mozart. He recorded with the Vienna Philharmonic, Berlin Philharmonic and Staatskapelle Dresden. His recordings of the complete Mozart symphonies were one of the first to be commercially released. Some of his most famous recordings include those of operas, such as Mozart's Cosi fan tutte with EMI and Wagner's Tristan und Isolde with DG.

=== Notable recordings ===
- Beethoven, Complete Symphonies and Overtures with the Vienna Philharmonic
- Beethoven, Piano Concertos No. 3 and 4 with Maurizio Pollini and Vienna Philharmonic (DG)
- Bruckner, Symphony No. 4 with the Vienna Philharmonic, 1973 (Decca-Legends)
- Haydn, The Seasons with Gundula Janowitz, Peter Schreier, Martti Talvela, Vienna Singverein and Vienna Philharmonic (DG)
- Mozart, Complete Symphonies with the Berlin Philharmonic
- Mozart, Clarinet Concerto, Flute Concerto No. 1, Bassoon Concerto with the Vienna Philharmonic (DG)
- Mozart, Cosi Fan Tutte with Elisabeth Schwarzkopf, Christa Ludwig, Giuseppe Taddei, Walter Berry and the Philharmonia Orchestra and Choir, 1963 (EMI, Great Recordings of the Century)
- Mozart, Le Nozze di Figaro, recorded with Dietrich Fischer-Dieskau, Edith Mathis, Gundula Janowitz, Hermann Prey, Tatiana Troyanos, the Ocherstra and Choir of Deutsche Oper Berlin (DG-The Originals)
- Mozart, The Magic Flute, recorded with Dietrich Fischer-Dieskau, Fritz Wunderlich, Evelyn Lear, Roberta Peters, the Berlin Philharmonic, 1964 (DG-The Originals)
- Mozart, Piano Concerto No. 27 Concerto for Two Pianos K365, with Emil and Elena Gilels and Vienna Philharmonic (DG-The Originals)
- Mozart, Requiem with Edith Mathis, Karl Ridderbusch, the Vienna Philharmonic and Vienna State Opera Choir (DG)
- Strauss, Eine Alpensinfonie / Till Eulenspiegel with the Staatskapelle Dresden, 1959, (DG -The Originals)
- Strauss, Der Rosenkavalier, Marianne Schech, Irmgard Seefried, Rita Streich, Dietrich Fischer-Dieskau, Kurt Böhme, Sächsische Staatskapelle Dresden, 1958 (DG)
- Wagner, Tristan und Isolde with Birgit Nilsson, Wolfgang Windgassen, Christa Ludwig, Eberhard Wächter, Martti Talvela and Bayreuth Festival Orchestra and Chours, 1966 (DG -The Originals)

== Honours and awards ==
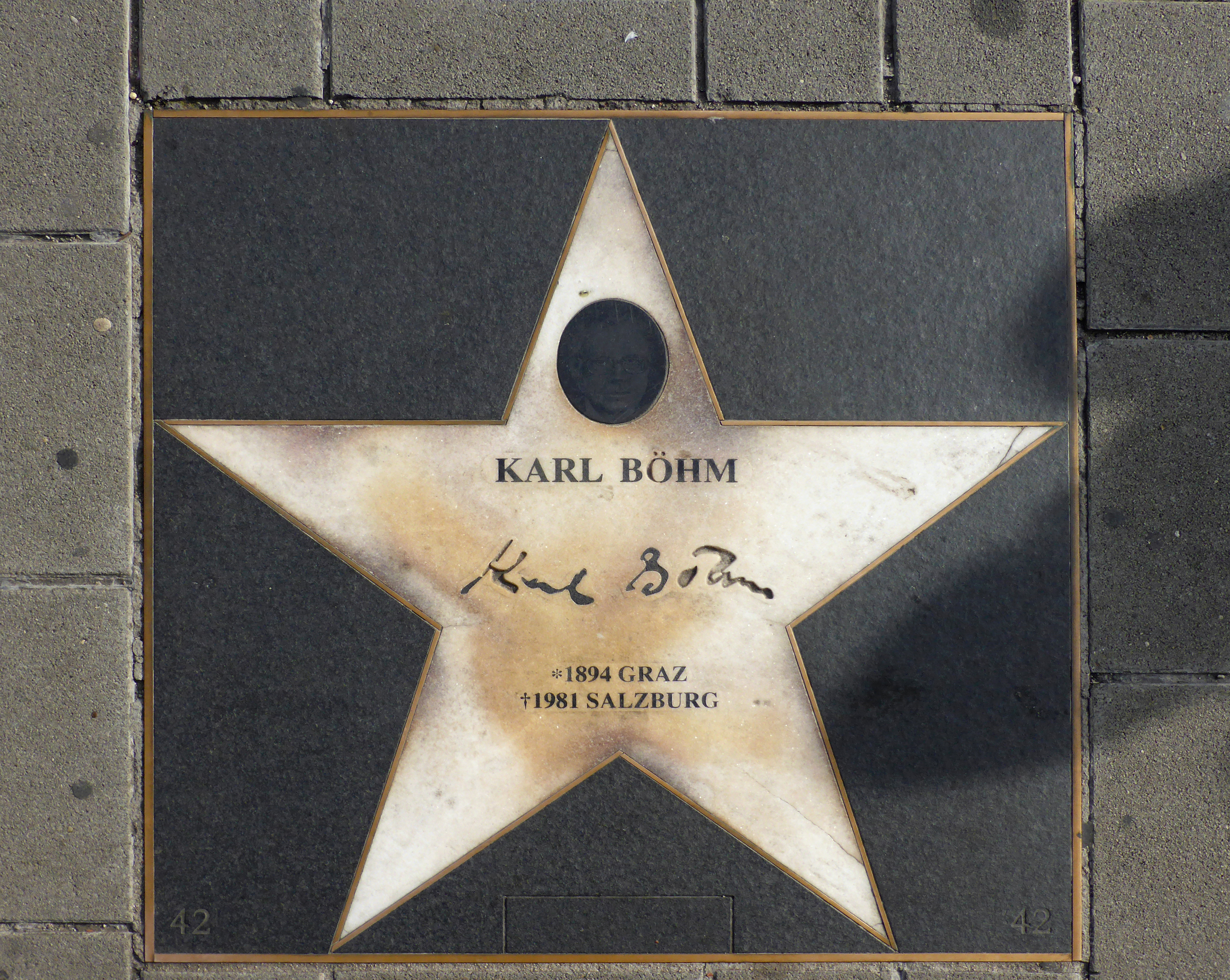
Böhm's star on the Vienna Walk of Fame

Böhm's awards include: 1943: War Merit Cross, 2nd class without swords (Kriegsverdienstkreuz II. Klasse ohne Schwerter); 1959: Grand Decoration of Honour in Silver for Services to the Republic of Austria; 1960: Grand Merit Cross of the Federal Republic of Germany (Großes Verdienstkreuz); 1964: Honorary Ring of Vienna; 1967: Berlin Art Prize; 1970: Austrian Cross of Honour for Science and Art; 1976: Commander of the Legion of Honour; Honorary Ring of Styria; and 2012: Gramophone Magazine Hall of Fame.

== See also ==
- List of Austrians in music
