= List of paintings by Suzanne Valadon =

This is an incomplete list of paintings by French artist Suzanne Valadon (1865–1938).

== Painting ==
Image	Article	Creation date	Collection	Inventory number	Depicts	Genre	Material used
	Self-portrait	1883			Suzanne Valadon	self-portrait	pastel
	Portrait of Erik Satie	1892	Musée National d'Art Moderne	AM 1974-117	Erik Satie beard hat eyeglasses	portrait	canvas oil paint
	Self-Portrait	1898	Museum of Fine Arts, Houston	98.306	Suzanne Valadon	self-portrait	oil paint canvas
	Adam and Eve	1909	Georges Pompidou Center, Paris, France	AM 2325 P		nude	oil paint canvas
(image)	Tree at Montmagny Quarry	c.1910	Carnegie Museum of Art	65.17.2			oil paint canvas
	Joy of Life	1911	Metropolitan Museum of Art	67.187.113			oil paint canvas
	Portraits de famille	1912	Musée d'Orsay	RF 1976 22	painter family woman	portrait	oil paint canvas
	The Tree	1912					oil paint canvas
	La Couturière	1914	Musée d'Orsay	AM 2208		genre art	oil paint canvas
	Casting the Net	1914	Museum of Fine Arts of Nancy	AM 2312 P		nude	
	Nudes	1919	São Paulo Museum of Art	MASP.00127		nude	oil paint cardboard
(image)	Utrillo devant son chevalet	1919	Musée d'Art Moderne de Paris	AMVP 1711	Maurice Utrillo	portrait	oil paint canvas
	Nude on a Red Sofa	1920	Musée du Petit Palais, Geneva			nude	
	The Abandoned Doll	1921	National Museum of Women in the Arts		woman doll mirror	nude	oil paint canvas
	Maurice Utrillo	1921			Maurice Utrillo	portrait	oil paint canvas
	Portrait of Mme Zamaron	1922	Museum of Modern Art	581.1964		portrait	oil paint canvas
(image)	Nude with Striped Blanket	1922	Musée d'Art Moderne de la Ville de Paris	AMVP 1710	Woman	nude	oil paint canvas
	The Blue Room	1923	Musée National d'Art Moderne	LUX 1506 P	Woman		oil paint canvas
	The Violin Case	1923	Musée d'Art Moderne de Paris	AMVP 1712	Violin violin case		oil paint canvas
	Woman in White Stockings	1924	Musée des beaux-arts de Nancy				
(image)	Nature morte à la draperie et au bouquet	1924	Musée d'Art Moderne de Paris	AMVP 1864		Still life	oil paint canvas
(image)	Nude	1925	Musée d'Art Moderne de Paris	AMVP 1057		nude	oil paint canvas
	Germaine Utter in front of her Window	1926	Seiji Togo Memorial Sompo Japan Nipponkoa Museum of Art.				
	Reclining Nude	1928	Metropolitan Museum of Art	1975.1.214			oil paint canvas
	Spring Flowers	1928	Statens Museum for Kunst	KMSr157			oil paint canvas
	Lilacs and Peonies	1929	Metropolitan Museum of Art	67.187.112	Syringa vulgaris Paeonia		oil paint canvas
	Young Girl in Front of a Window	1930	San Diego Museum of Art	1976.306			oil paint canvas
	Bouquet de Roses, Bleuets et Fougères	1930	Deji Art Museum, Nanjing				
(image)	Nu au châle bleu	1930	Musée d'Unterlinden, Colmar	2008.8.117			oil paint canvas
(Image)	Bouquet of Roses	1936	Musée des Beaux-Arts de Brest, France	AM1974-119		still life	oil paint on plywood
(image)	Still Life with Fruit	1937	Carnegie Museum of Art	67.17		still life	oil paint canvas
