= Rififi in Tokyo =

1963 French-Italian crime film

- Directed by: Jacques Deray
- Written by: Auguste Le Breton (novel); José Giovanni; Jacques Deray; Rodolphe-Maurice Arlaud; José Giovanni
- Produced by: Jacques Bar; Luigi Nannerini
- Starring: Karlheinz Böhm; Charles Vanel; Barbara Lass
- Cinematography: Tadashi Aramaki
- Edited by: Albert Jurgenson
- Music by: Georges Delerue
- Production companies: Compagnia Cinematografica Mondiale; Compagnie Internationale de Productions Cinématographiques
- Distributed by: Metro-Goldwyn-Mayer
- Release date: 29 March 1963
- Running time: 98 minutes
- Countries: France; Italy
- Language: French

Rififi in Tokyo (French: Rififi à Tokyo) is a 1963 French-Italian crime film directed by Jacques Deray and starring Karlheinz Böhm, Charles Vanel and Barbara Lass.

== Plot ==
The veteran gangster Van Hekken arrives in Tokyo to pull off a heist of a precious diamond from a bank vault. However, when his planned second-in command is killed he turns to the dead man's friend Carl Mersen.

== Cast ==
- Karlheinz Böhm as Carl Mersen
- Charles Vanel as Van Hekken
- Barbara Lass as Françoise Merigné
- Keiko Kishi as Asami
- Michel Vitold as Pierre Merigné
- Eiji Okada as Danny Riquet
- Masao Oda as Kan
- Dante Maggio as Luigi
- Hideaki Suzuki as Itoushi
- Eijiro Yanagi as Ishimoto

== Bibliography ==
- Monaco, James. The Encyclopedia of Film. Perigee Books, 1991.
