= Katharina Böhm =

Austrian actress (born 1964)

- Born: Katharina Böhm; 20 November 1964 (age 61); Sorengo, Switzerland
- Occupation: Actress
- Partner: Rick Ostermann
- Children: 1
- Parents: Karlheinz Böhm (father); Barbara Kwiatkowska-Lass (mother)
- Relatives: Karl Böhm (grandfather)

Katharina Böhm (born 20 November 1964) is a Swiss-born Austrian actress. Between 1999 and 2002 she played the role of Livia Burlando in the Italian TV series Il commissario Montalbano, based on the character Salvo Montalbano from the novels created by Andrea Camilleri.

Böhm was born in Sorengo, Switzerland, the daughter of Karlheinz Böhm and Barbara Kwiatkowska-Lass, as well as the granddaughter of Karl Böhm. She first appeared on camera in 1978, when she played a lead role (Klara) in the Austrian television production of Heidi. She played Susanne 'Nane' von Guldenburg in Das Erbe der Guldenburgs (1987 to 1990). Her more recent work includes four different roles in different episodes of The Old Fox between 2002 and 2010. In 2010 she was in Season 8, Episode 3 of Stolberg. Since 2012 she starred as First Police Chief Inspector Vera Lanz in Die Chefin.

Böhm is the longtime companion of assistant director Rick Ostermann, the couple live in Baldham near Munich, Germany with her son Samuel (born 1998).
