= Die Chefin =

2012 German crime television series

- Genre: Crime drama
- Written by: Orkun Ertener; Sven Poser; Daniel Douglas Wissmann
- Starring: Katharina Böhm; Stefan Rudolf; Jürgen Tonkel; Nicole Marischka; Stephan Kampwirth; Olga von Luckwald; Hermann Beyer
- Country of origin: Germany
- Original language: German
- No. of seasons: 13
- No. of episodes: 80

Production
- Producers: Wolfgang Cimera; Susanne Flor
- Production locations: Munich, Bavaria
- Running time: 60 minutes
- Production company: Network Movie Film- und Fernsehproduktion

Original release
- Network: ZDF
- Release: 24 February 2012 – present

Die Chefin is a German crime drama television series starring Katharina Böhm as First Police Chief Inspector Vera Lanz, a Munich police detective who has to balance her professional and private life. The show premiered on 24 February 2012 on ZDF.

== Plot ==
Vera Lanz is First Police Chief Inspector of the Homicide division in Munich. After the mysterious death of her husband, a fellow inspector, Vera raises her daughter Zoe alone. Successful in her professional life, Vera struggles personally as she's having an affair with the married state's attorney. Her co-worker, Police Chief Inspector Paul Böhmer, is the former partner of her late husband, which provides tension between the investigators. In the first episode, Jan Trompeter completes Vera's team.

== Characters ==
=== Main ===
Chief Inspector Vera Lanz (Katharina Böhm) works in the homicide division in Munich. Her husband died under unexplained circumstances, and the series follows her professional work alongside her personal life.

Police Chief Inspector Paul Böhmer (Jürgen Tonkel) is the former partner of Vera's husband. Even though he seems very loyal and even protective of Vera, there exists a lot of tension between them.

Police Inspector Jan Trompeter (Stefan Rudolf) is the new colleague of Vera and Paul, who's very good as his job and seems to have caught the eye of his boss.

=== Recurring ===
Medical Examiner Heike Steinbeck (Nicole Marischka) works in the coroner's office; she is a friend of Vera.

State Attorney Marc Berger (Stephan Kampwirth) is involved in Vera's professional and private life. Even though he's married, Marc has an affair with Vera.

Zoe Lanz (Olga von Luckwald) is Vera's teenage daughter, who's about to finish school and plans to move in together with her boyfriend.

Georg Lanz (Hermann Beyer) is the father of Vera's late husband and is still investigating his son's mysterious death.

== Episodes ==
=== Season 1 (2012) ===
No.	Title	Directed by	Written by	Original release date	Viewers (millions)
1	"Enthüllung"	Maris Pfeiffer	Orkun Ertener	24 February 2012	5.80
The 24-year-old Kim Landau, daughter of a prominent innkeeper, is thrown from the balcony of her apartment after returning home from a nightclub. It looks like a suicide at first, but soon Vera Lanz and her co-workers find proof that Kim Landau was murdered. The investigation focuses on Kim's ex-boyfriend and his prominent family. The father of the victim is holding a former business partner responsible and in his grief and pain seems capable of everything.

== Production ==
Filming for the first season, for which the ZDF network ordered four episodes, started on 31 May 2011 and wrapped up on 8 August 2011. Intentionally planned for Saturday nights, Die Chefin became part of the network's famous Friday night line-up, with many crime dramas like Der Alte or Ein Fall für zwei. Die Chefin is the first Friday night crime drama that revolves around a female investigator.

== Reception ==
Die Chefin was positively received by critics. Der Spiegel wrote that Böhm could "believably show the balance between a successful inspector and a struggling woman". The online magazine Quotenmeter gave the show 80 out of 100 and wrote that "the opposing team of investigators can claim all sympathy".
