= Adam and Eve (Valadon) =

Painting by Suzanne Valadon

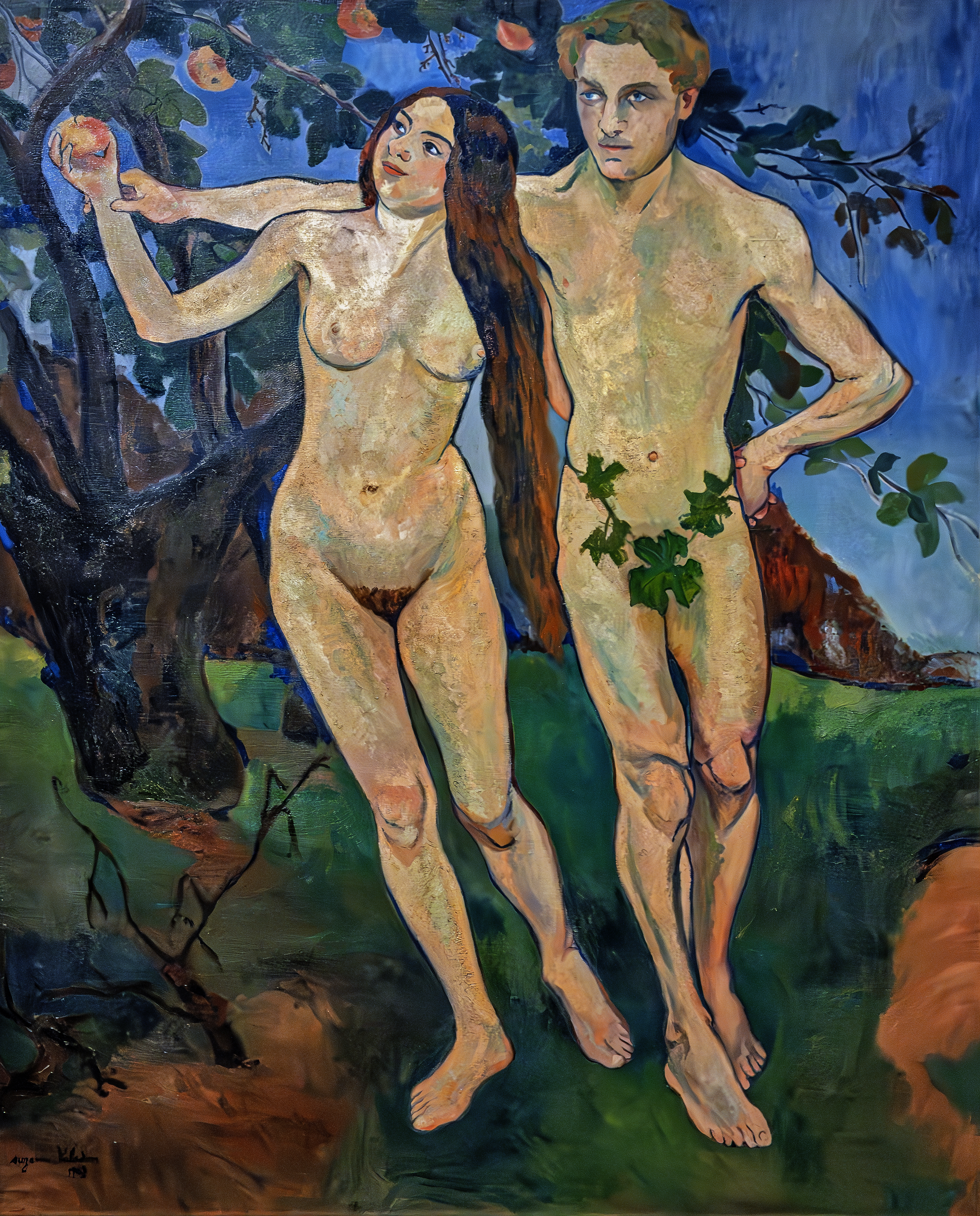
- Artist: Suzanne Valadon
- Year: 1909
- Medium: Oil on canvas
- Dimensions: 162 cm × 131 cm (64 in × 52 in)
- Location: Musée National d'Art Moderne, Paris

Adam and Eve is an oil-on-canvas painting by French artist Suzanne Valadon, executed in 1909. Its dimensions are 162 by 131 cm. It is held at the Musée National d'Art Moderne, in Paris.

== History and description ==
Valadon was in a romantic relationship with the painter André Utter, who was 24 years younger, when she created this painting. In it she depicts herself, appearing younger than she was at the time, and Utter as Adam and Eve in the Garden of Eden. The original canvas showed Utter completely nude, but the artist decided to add the leaves covering his genitals to allow her work to be exhibited at the Salon in 1920. It is important to notice that they both do not realize they are nude as Suzanne depicts them as Adam has his hand on Eve's wrist begging her to not eat the forbidden fruit.

This is the first painting that Valadon created depicting an outdoors scene. It is also believed to have been the first painting by a female artist portraying a nude couple that was exhibited publicly. In the painting Eve reaches happily for the apple, while she is entwined with Adam. There is no serpent in the painting. It can be interpreted as a metaphor for Valadon's relationship with a younger man, as if it was the forbidden fruit.

According to biographer Catherine Hewitt: "The couple, Suzanne confessed, were caught in a timeless paradise and they were both responsible for their sin".

== See also ==
- List of paintings by Suzanne Valadon
