= The Abandoned Doll =

Painting by Suzanne Valadon

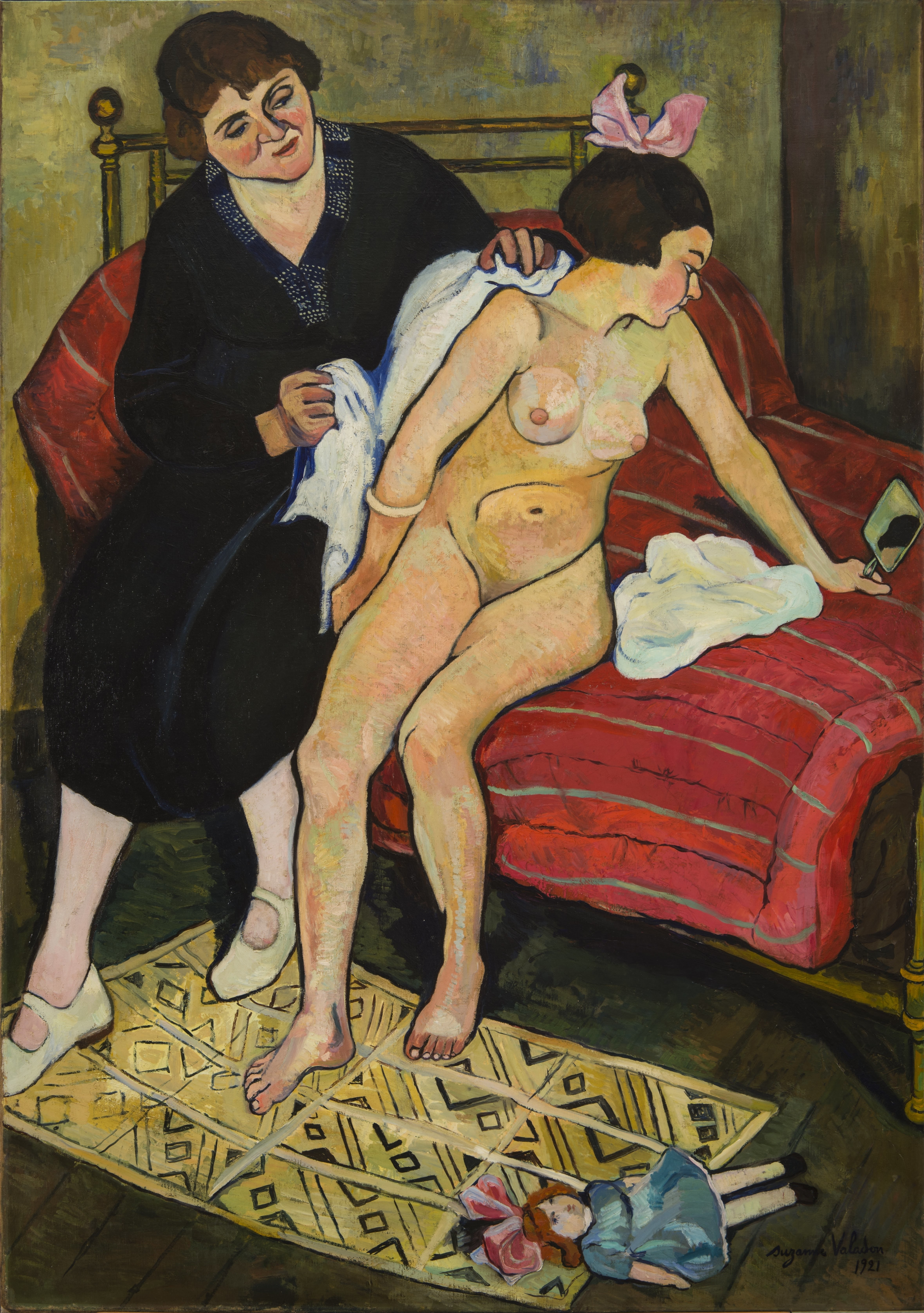
- Artist: Suzanne Valadon
- Year: 1921
- Medium: Oil on canvas
- Dimensions: 135 cm × 95 cm (53 in × 37 in)
- Location: National Museum of Women in the Arts, Washington, D.C.

The Abandoned Doll is an oil-on-canvas painting executed in 1921 by French artist Suzanne Valadon. It has the dimensions of 135 by 95 cm. It is held at the National Museum of Women in the Arts, in Washington, D.C.

== History and analysis ==
Suzanne Valadon was known for her unconventional and controversial paintings, often depicting nude women. Abandoned Doll is one of two paired portraits of Marie Cola, with her daughter Gilberte, niece of the artist.

This painting is an example of Valadon's mature art: brightly colored forms with dark contours, strange and somewhat uncomfortable poses, simplified and distorted anatomy. Similar features can be found in the work of Paul Gauguin and Henri Matisse, but Valadon denied their influence and avoided any attempt to classify her own style.

The painting depicts an ambiguous scene set in a small room. In the center is a girl with a very childish hairstyle and a developed female body. In front of her on the ground lies a doll. A woman is seated next to the girl on the bed, wiping her body with a towel. The woman is fully clothed and the girl is undressed. The young girl is turned away and carefully examines herself in a small hand mirror. She is sitting on a double bed. It remains unclear whether the woman is the girl's mother helping her overcome the problems of transitional age, or whether she is the mistress of a brothel preparing a young prostitute for defloration.

The doll has the same hairstyle with a big bow in her hair as the girl, and both her legs are tightly clenched. But the doll lies abandoned, symbolizing apparently the departure from childhood. The viewer can only guess what fate awaits this young girl, absorbed in looking at herself and not knowing all the intrigues that the adult world is preparing for her. Valadon does not give a single clue to understand the meaning of the painting.

== See also ==
- List of paintings by Suzanne Valadon
