= Effi Briest (1974 film) =

- Theatrical release poster
- Directed by: Rainer Werner Fassbinder
- Screenplay by: Rainer Werner Fassbinder
- Based on: Effi Briest by Theodor Fontane
- Starring: Hanna Schygulla
- Narrated by: Rainer Werner Fassbinder
- Cinematography: Dietrich Lohmann
- Edited by: Thea Eymèsz
- Music by: Camille Saint-Saëns
- Distributed by: Tango Film
- Release date: 5 July 1974
- Running time: 140 minutes
- Country: West Germany
- Language: German
- Budget: DEM 750,000
- Box office: ITL 38,500,000

Effi Briest (also known as Fontane Effi Briest; original title: Fontane Effi Briest oder Viele, die eine Ahnung haben von ihren Möglichkeiten und Bedürfnissen und trotzdem das herrschende System in ihrem Kopf akzeptieren durch ihre Taten und es somit festigen und durchaus bestätigen, literally Fontane Effi Briest or Many people who are aware of their own capabilities and needs just acquiesce to the prevailing system in their thoughts and deeds, thereby confirming and reinforcing it) is a 1974 West German black-and-white historical drama film directed, written and narrated by Rainer Werner Fassbinder. Fassbinder adapted the screenplay from German author Theodor Fontane's 1894 novel of the same name about a young 19th century woman whose affair with a charismatic womanizer has long-term effects on her marriage to an older man. The film uses Fontane's words in dialogue, narration and text of letters.

== Plot ==
The film begins with Effi von Briest, aged 17, on the swing in her parents' garden. Her mother comments on her wild nature, saying that she has an aerial spirit. Talking with other teenage girls, they discuss how Effi's mother was courted by Baron von Instetten when he was a soldier but she chose Effi's father, a councillor and landowner.

Later, Effi's mother tells her that Instetten, now aged 38 and an official, has asked for her hand. With her parents' encouragement, along with her own desire for prestige, she accepts. Effi and her mother begin to prepare for the honeymoon: although Effi does not want for most possessions, when she desires something only the best will do. Just before leaving, she admits to her mother that while Instetten is considerate, principled, and dashing, she is nonetheless frightened by him. Left alone, her parents discuss married life, during which Briest comments that his wife would have suited Instetten much better than Effi.

Effi and Instetten return to his home on the Baltic Sea in the fictional town of Kessin. They are greeted by the cold and distant housekeeper Johanna, who secretly loves her master and resents his new wife. Through her first night there, Effi is unable to sleep due to being frightened by what she thinks is a ghost. At dinner next day, she learns that they are the only nobles in the town and cannot socialise with its middle-class inhabitants. Instead, there are tedious exchanges of visits with nobles on surrounding estates. However, Effi does find a friend in the pharmacist Gieshübler, who loves music.

Instetten has to be away on duty one night, leaving Effi alone. Again she is unable to sleep, causing her to ask Johanna to keep her company through the night. Instetten reproaches her for this, as he does not want people discovering that his wife is afraid of ghosts, but neither does he relieve her fears.

Soon Effi becomes pregnant. While taking a walk one day, she meets a Catholic woman named Roswitha at the grave of her late employer. Seeing that she is a warm and open person, Effi asks her to become the nursemaid for her child. Eventually, Effi gives birth to a girl that they name Annie.

One day, Effi goes to the beach with Instetten and his friend, Major Crampas. Instetten believes Crampas to be a ladies' man, while Crampas describes Instetten as a born schoolteacher. Effi realizes that Instetten had been using the ghost she was frightened of to educate her, as well as a way to distinguish himself from ordinary men. Eventually, Instetten is unable to continue the excursions as his attention is required for a political campaign, leaving Crampas and Effi to continue alone. Soon, Effi is taking walks every day, to the point that even inclement weather cannot stop her.

After some years, Effi, Instetten, and Annie move to Berlin, where Instetten has gained a prominent position in a government ministry. Effi is glad of this, since she always found Kessin to be spooky. However, one day Instetten finds letters that Crampas had been writing to Effi. That the two had been lovers is obvious, but it is also clear that the affair ended some time ago. After going to his friend Wüllersdorf for advice, he commits himself to initiating a duel with Crampas, in which he shoots his rival dead.

He divorces Effi and gains custody over Annie, who he raises under the belief that she has no mother. Effi's parents refuse to let her come home, because of the scandal she has caused, so she moves into a small apartment in Berlin with the faithful Roswitha. A few years later, Annie is permitted a brief visit to Effi but the two are distant with each other. Effi is enraged with Instetten, blaming him for teaching her daughter to act like a stranger to her, and suffers a nervous collapse.

Her parents agree to take care of her in their home, but Instetten remains obdurate, believing that she has been the ruin of his life. Her own life failing, Effi asks her mother to tell Instetten that she forgives him and that she is now at peace. Sitting in the garden after her death, her mother wonders if they are somehow at fault for causing her fate, but her father dismisses the idea with his usual evasion: “Ach, Luise, laß … das ist ein zu weites Feld." ("Oh leave it, Luise. … it's too broad a subject.")

== Cast list ==
- Hanna Schygulla as Effi Briest
- Wolfgang Schenck as Baron Geert von Instetten
- Ulli Lommel as Major Crampas
- Lilo Pempeit as Frau von Briest (Effi's mother)
- Herbert Steinmetz as Herr von Briest (Effi's father)
- Irm Hermann as Johanna
- Hark Bohm as Gieshübler, the pharmacist
- Karlheinz Böhm as Councillor Wüllersdorf
- Rudolf Lenz as Councillor Rummschuttel
- Eva Mattes as Hulda
- Ursula Strätz as Roswitha
- Karl Scheydt as Kruse
- An Dorthe Braker as Frau Paaschen
- Theo Tecklenburg as Pastor Niemeyer
- Andrea Schober as Annie von Instetten
- Barbara Valentin as Marietta Tripelli
- Peter Gauhe as Cousin Dagobert
- Barbara Kwiatkowska-Lass as the Polish cook

== Historical context ==
The original novel, Effi Briest by Theodor Fontane, was inspired by real-life events, as it was based on a scandal between an army officer and his wife. Apparently, the wife had entered an affair, and once the husband learned of it, he challenged and killed the lover in a duel. Although this was illegal, it was still considered an appropriate means of maintaining honor in Prussian society during Fontane's time period. Thus, the man was hardly punished at all, while the woman would resort to nursing for the remainder of her life. Fontane turned this story into a condemnatory portrayal about how the 19th-century code of honor can both constrain and ruin a person's life.

While in the year of 1968 the student-led protests movement known as the German student movement or the movement of 1968, and the attempted assassination of their leader, Rudi Dutschke all occurred. These students were infuriated that many leaders of the Nazi regime continued to hold positions of power, as well as various restrictive legal reforms and their lack of power in the running of their universities.

In the 1970s, the women's civil rights movement gained popularity and began to form an individual movement, having previously been a part of the student protests since 1968. Women were coming to realize that they were being suppressed by society's double standards for men and women. Perceiving the patriarchal nature of society, they aimed to change their position. This movement would ultimately prove successful when in 1977 legislation granted married women the right to divorce and the ability to work outside of home.

Similarities between Effi Briest and 20th-century Germany were easily found, helping to explain the popularity of the book and its subsequent film adaptions there. During the 1970s, West Germany was being racked by civil unrest as people sought to effect change, among these movements was the women's civil rights movement, which became a major influence for the film, as it compared the repressive nature in society between 19th century Prussia and 1970s West Germany.

== Analysis ==
As the double title of the film indicates, the ultimate purpose of the film is to analyze how a social system can restrict the freedom of people. During the time of Theodor Fontane, it was actually common to include a second title by adding an or statement. With such an arrangement, the first title was usually the name of the main character, while the second is used to describe the social stigma being critiqued. However, Theodor Fontane did not include the second in the original novel Effi Briest, but was instead added by Fassbinder in his production of the film.

Throughout the film, Fassbinder attempts to demonstrate the effects of the restraints of society on the suppression of emotions. This is done by distancing the audience from the action, primarily through techniques such as keeping the most dramatic scenes off-screen and the segmentation of events. For instance, there is never a single scene depicting the affair between Effi and Crampas, with all of it remaining off-screen. And rather than being shown Annie's birth, the narrator rather tells us about it, further separating the audience from the action. With such techniques the audience is denied the melodramatic scenes expected from a film about adultery, using this restraint to heighten the theme of repression.

Although the ending to the film is very tragic, it is not due to Effi's death. Rather, it is because she believed that she died believing that the guilt had been her own responsibility, and because it demonstrates how social conventions are able to prevent one from loving one another with their entire capacity. This film demonstrates how being a principled man can result in his own enervation.

== Production ==
This movie was of extreme personal importance to Fassbinder, as he hoped that it would become his directorial debut. However, it would take three years of both conceptualizing Effi Briest, and raising the funds necessary to produce it before he would actually be able to film it. As Fassbinder described it, the reason he was so enraptured with Effi Briest and Fontane was due to how he "rejected everybody and found everything alienating and yet fought all his life for recognition". The production of this film took an even more personal turn for Fassbinder when he chose to cast his own mother, Lilo Pempeit, as the mother of Effi Briest, and decided to narrate the movie himself, personally rereading and interpreting Fontane's own words.

== Reception ==
The film received generally positive reviews. Effi Briest was also named one of the Best 1,000 Movies Ever Made by The New York Times.

Awards

The film won the 1974 Interfilm Award at the 24th Berlin International Film Festival and was nominated for the Golden Bear.
