= Violent Life =

Violent Life (Una vita violenta)
- VHS cover
- Directed by: Paolo Heusch; Brunello Rondi
- Written by: Pier Paolo Pasolini (novel), Paolo Heusch, Brunello Rondi, Pier Paolo Pasolini, Franco Solinas
- Starring: Franco Citti, Enrico Maria Salerno
- Cinematography: Armando Nannuzzi
- Edited by: Nino Baragli
- Music by: Piero Piccioni
- Distributed by: Zebra Film
- Release date: March 29, 1962 (Italy)
- Running time: 115 minutes
- Country: Italy
- Language: Italian

Una vita violenta (internationally released as Violent Life) is a 1962 Italian drama film by Paolo Heusch and Brunello Rondi, at his directorial debut. It is based on a novel with the same name by Pier Paolo Pasolini.

The film was shown as part of a retrospective "Questi fantasmi: Cinema italiano ritrovato" at the 65th Venice International Film Festival.

== Plot ==
The film tells the story of a group of young adults who live in a township of the poorest and most disreputable neighborhoods of Rome. The story is set in the economically depressed climate of the Second World War's end. In this neighborhood, some people are living in makeshift shacks on the outskirts of the city. The postwar prosperity has not yet materialized. Tommaso is a youth who lives at the expense of others, like all his other companions, stealing cars, and wasting time and occasionally terrorizing complete strangers. Tommaso, in fact, is seen as a leader of this “gang”, stealing anything of value, such as pieces of iron, flour, whatever is not to difficult to steal and turn a profit on. Thus, with a few thousand lira, Tommaso and friends can have fun going to prostitutes or watching movies at the cinema.
Tommaso lives this dissolute lifestyle, returning home only for dinner and going out each night, looking for opportunities to enrich himself and his friends at the expense of others. Some of his companions are enamored with Mussolini and are hostile to those who support the Italian Communist Party. Yet, they visit the local communist party headquarters where dances are held and young people congregate. At one of the dances he meets a girl, Irene, with whom he becomes enamored. She agrees to go on a date to the cinema with him, but he is only interested in gaining sexual experience and she is quite uncomfortable with his clumsy approach. Inexplicably, something about him keeps attracting her. One night, Tommaso, after trying to reconcile with his estranged girlfriend, kills a man. He is arrested, and sentenced to 2 years in prison.
Tommaso comes out of prison a somewhat changed man, and the old neighborhood has also changed. Many new apartments have been built and his mother has been able to receive one.
Tommaso is a heavy smoker and he develops tuberculosis. He is sent to a sanitarium to recover. While there, he continues to reflect on his life, shows concern for others, and starts to think about his future and regret his past.
Returning home, Tommaso gets engaged to the beautiful Irene and also decides to join the Communist Party to please her father. However, he resumes smoking cigarettes and risks his life, while taking altruistic action on behalf of a complete stranger in a driving rainstorm. Although his inner spiritual health is much improved his physical health deteriorates again and he meets his demise before realizing his dreams.

== Cast ==
- Franco Citti: Tommaso
- Serena Vergano: Irene
- Enrico Maria Salerno: Bernardini, the trade-union representative
- Angelo Maria Santiamantini: Lello
