= Werewolf in a Girls' Dormitory =

1961 film directed by Paolo Heusch

- Italian theatrical release poster
- Italian: Lycanthropus
- Directed by: Paolo Heusch
- Written by: Ernesto Gastaldi
- Produced by: Guido Giambartolomei
- Starring: Barbara Lass; Carl Schell
- Cinematography: Renato Del Frate
- Edited by: Giuliana Attenni
- Music by: Armando Trovajoli
- Production company: Royal Film
- Distributed by: Cineriz
- Release date: 9 November 1961 (Italy)
- Running time: 82 minutes
- Country: Italy
- Language: Italian
- Box office: ₤115 million

Werewolf in a Girls' Dormitory (Italian: Lycanthropus, also released as Monster Among the Girls) is a 1961 Italian mystery horror film directed by Paolo Heusch, written by Ernesto Gastaldi, and starring Barbara Lass, Carl Schell, Curt Lowens, and Maurice Marsac. The plot follows a girls' detention facility that is plagued by attacks from an unknown entity.

== Plot ==
Wolves have been roaming around a girls' reformatory. When the girls begin to get murdered, suspicion focuses on both the wolves and on a handsome, newly hired science teacher, who might be a werewolf.

== Cast ==
- Barbara Lass as Priscilla
- Carl Schell as Julian Olcott
- Curt Lowens as Director Swift
- Maurice Marsac as Sir Alfred Whiteman
- Donatella Marrosu as Sandy
- Michela Roc as Mary Smith
- Grazia Fachini as Leonore MacDonald
- Luciano Pigozzi as Walter Geoffrey
- Anny Degli Uberti as Sheena Whiteman
- Liliana Rondoni as Ms. Schultz
- Giuseppe Transocchi as Tommy
- John Karlsen as Old Man (uncredited)

== Production ==
Werewolf in a Girls' Dormitory was shot in 1961 at Cinecittà Studios and on-location in Rome. Much of the cast and crew adopted English-sounding pseudonyms for the film, such as 'Richard Benson' (director Paolo Heusch), 'Julian Berry' (writer Ernesto Gastaldi), and 'Francis Berman' (composer Armando Trovajoli). Gastaldi later explained that it was mandatory to give yourself an English name in Italian productions of the time because "that's the way the producers wanted it."

German-American actor Curt Lowens plays the werewolf in the film. Lowens described the werewolf transformations as being shot in reverse starting with full make-up and shot in reverse with more elements of his transformations being removed, the whole process shot with dissolves taking over three hours. Lowens described shooting the film as a chaotic experience with actors all predominantly speaking different languages: English, Italian, French and German.

== Release ==
Werewolf in a Girls' Dormitory was released in Italy on November 9, 1961 where it was distributed by Cineriz. The film grossed a total of 115 million Italian lira on its theatrical run. The film was shown in the United States on June 6, 1963 where it was distributed by MGM.

The American version of the film added the rock song "The Ghoul in School" to the opening credits written by Marilyn Stewart and Frank Owens. The song had vocals by Adam Keefe and was released on a 45 RPM record distributed by Cub Records.

It was released on DVD in the United States by Retromedia and Alpha Video. It was released on Blu-Ray by Severin Films in October 2019.

== Reception ==
From contemporary reviews, The Globe and Mail stated that the film was "disfigured by bad dubbing and a silly attempt to establish the locale as the United States, it might have been a very respectable specimen of the horror school" A review in the Monthly Film Bulletin reviewed an 81-minute dubbed version of the film titled I Married a Werewolf, describing it as a "grotesque horror film" where "a certain relish can be derived in the early stages from the unspeakably foolish dialogue; but there is really nothing else on any level which one can possibly recommend."

Danny Shipka, author of Perverse Titillation: The Exploitation Cinema of Italy, Spain and France 1960-1980 stated the film "won't convert any fans to the genre", due to a slow pace and poor dubbing in the English-language version.

== See also ==
- List of horror films of 1961
- List of Italian films of 1961

== Notes ==
=== References ===
- Curti, Roberto (2015). Italian Gothic Horror Films 1957-1969. McFarland & Company. ISBN 978-1476619897.
- Shipka, Danny (2011). Perverse Titillation: The Exploitation Cinema of Italy, Spain and France 1960-1980. United States: McFarland & Company. ISBN 978-0786448883.
- McCallum, Lawrence (1998). Italian Horror Films of the 1960s: A Critical Catalog of 62 Chillers. United States: McFarland & Company. ISBN 0786404353.
