= Maurice Marsac =

French actor (1915–2007)

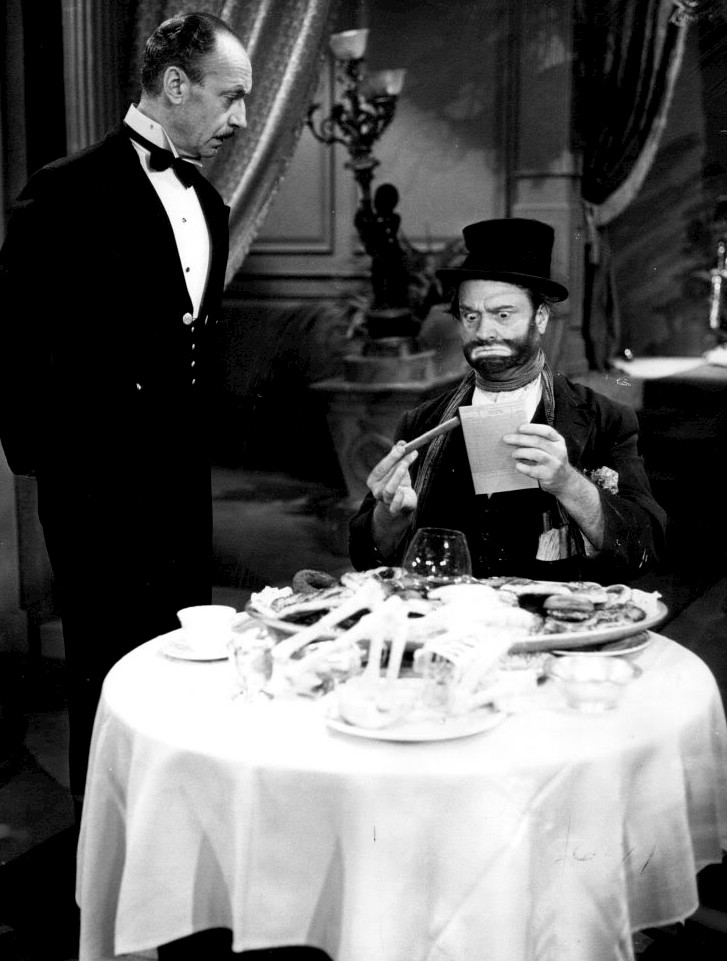
- Marsac (left) and Red Skelton on The Red Skelton Hour December 1954 episode "The Cop and the Anthem"
- Born: Maurice Louis Clement Ferrat; 23 March 1915; La Croix-Valmer, Provence-Alpes-Côte d'Azur, France
- Died: 6 May 2007 (aged 92); Santa Rosa, California, U.S.
- Occupation: Actor
- Years active: 1943–1987
- Spouse: Melanie Adelina Tenorio de Marsac (1952–2007; her death)

Maurice Marsac (born Maurice Louis Clement Ferrat; 23 March 1915 – 6 May 2007) was a French actor who had a long career in the United States, with over 150 appearances in American films and television. He was also a nationally ranked croquet player.

== Early life ==
Marsac was born in La Croix-Valmer, Provence-Alpes-Côte d'Azur in 1915. He was a captain in the French Army Reserves and later worked as a clerk at the French embassy in Great Britain, until the outbreak of World War II led him to move to the United States. He made a string of minor acting appearances, then returned to France during the liberation with the Free French Forces. After the war, he permanently settled in Southern California, initially working as a sales representative for a French winemaking firm.

== Career ==
Marsac appeared in over 150 films and television series between 1943 and 1987, typically in small character roles as comic waiters and maitre d's. He played one in the films The Razor's Edge (1946, uncredited), Herbie Rides Again (1974) and The Jerk (1979), as well as episodes of I Love Lucy ("Ricky Asks for a Raise", 1952; "Paris at Last", 1956), Hazel (1966), Columbo ("Publish or Perish", 1975), Wonder Woman ("Death in Disguise", 1978), Soap (1979), The Fall Guy ("The Lady In Green", 1986), and L.A. Law ("The Douglas Fur Ball", 1987), among others. He also played Nicodemus in the 1961 biblical epic King of Kings. In the early 1960s, he also starred in an Italian (Werewolf in a Girls' Dormitory, 1961) and Spanish film (Perro golfo, 1963).

=== Croquet ===
He was a member of the Beverly Croquet Club and a resident pro in Newport Beach. In 1986, he was among the top 25 American players in the "informal rankings". He played in the 1994 US Croquet Open, a qualifier for the 1995 World Championships.

== Personal life ==
Melanie, his wife of 55 years, a Mexican national, was also a skilled croquet player. She was born on 12 May 1916 and died on 16 April 2007, aged 90.

=== Death ===
Marsac died of cardiac arrest on 6 May 2007, aged 92, less than three weeks after the passing of his wife.

== Partial filmography ==
- Paris After Dark (1943) - French soldier (uncredited)
- This Is the Life (1944) - Leon
- Our Hearts Were Young and Gay (1944) - Headwaiter (uncredited)
- To Have and Have Not (1944) - Gaullist (uncredited)
- Her Highness and the Bellboy (1945) - Footman (uncredited)
- The Searching Wind (1946) - French reporter (uncredited)
- The Razor's Edge (1946) - Maitre d'hotel (uncredited)
- The Foxes of Harrow (1947) - Minor role (uncredited)
- The Crime Doctor's Gamble (1947) - Anton Geroux
- The Woman from Tangier (1948) - Martine
- Rogues' Regiment (1948) - Lieutenant (uncredited)
- Take One False Step (1949) - Louis (uncredited)
- The Secret of St. Ives (1949) - Portuguese Joe (uncredited)
- Once More, My Darling (1949) - Henri (uncredited)
- Tyrant of the Sea (1950) - Phillipe Daumer
- The Iroquois Trail (1950) - Garon - French adjutant (uncredited)
- Last of the Buccaneers (1950) - Pirate captain (uncredited)
- Three Husbands (1950) - Frenchman in movie (uncredited)
- L'inconnue de Montréal (1950)
- Lydia Bailey (1952) - Sentry (uncredited)
- Captain Pirate (1952) - Captain Coulevain (uncredited)
- One Minute to Zero (1952) - M.F. Villon (uncredited)
- Assignment – Paris! (1952) - Gendarme (uncredited)
- The Golden Hawk (1952) - Captain at briefing (uncredited)
- The Happy Time (1952) - The Great Gaspari
- Against All Flags (1952) - Captain Moisson
- April in Paris (1952) - M. Dionne (uncredited)
- Tonight We Sing (1953) - Assistant stage manager (uncredited)
- The Desert Song (1953) - Sentry (uncredited)
- The Caddy (1953) - Mr. Gaston Leron
- How to Marry a Millionaire (1953) - Mr. Antoine (uncredited)
- Rhapsody (1954) - French servant (uncredited)
- The Black Shield of Falworth (1954) - Count de Vermois
- Athena (1954) - French butler (uncredited)
- Alfred Hitchcock Presents (1955) - Hotel clerk (season 1 episode "Into Thin Air", aka "The Vanishing Lady")
- Jump into Hell (1955) - Captain LeRoy
- Ride the High Iron (1956) - Maurice
- Four Girls in Town (1957) - Henri Dauray
- China Gate (1957) - Colonel De Sars
- Band of Angels (1957) - Auction participant (uncredited)
- The Helen Morgan Story (1957) - Dubois (uncredited)
- Les Girls (1957) - French house manager (uncredited)
- Lafayette Escadrille (1958) - Sergeant Parris
- Gigi (1958) - Prince Berensky (uncredited)
- Twilight for the Gods (1958) - Shipping clerk
- Me and the Colonel (1958) - French lieutenant
- It Started with a Kiss (1959) - Don Pablo (uncredited)
- The Black Chapel (1959) - Britischer Botschafter
- Scent of Mystery (1960) - Pepi
- Can-Can (1960) - Bailiff (uncredited)
- Armored Command (1961) - Jean Robert
- King of Kings (1961) - Nicodemus
- Werewolf in a Girls' Dormitory (1961) - Sir Alfred Whiteman
- Perro golfo (1963) - Cristino
- Come Fly with Me (1963) - Monsieur Rinard
- Captain Sindbad (1963) - Ahmed
- Take Her, She's Mine (1963) - M. Bonnet
- Natika (1963)
- Wild and Wonderful (1964) - Announcer
- What a Way to Go! (1964) - Rene
- The Pleasure Seekers (1964) - Jose
- The Beverly Hillbillies (1964) - Maurice (season 2 episodes "The Dress Shop"; "The House of Granny"; "The Continental Touch")
- The Art of Love (1965) - Prosecutor
- Clarence, the Cross-Eyed Lion (1965) - Gregory
- Hogan's Heroes (1965 -1967) - Le Professeur Dubois (season 1 episode "The Scientist"); Jacques Mornay (season 3 episode "An Evening of General")
- Gambit (1966) - Hotel clerk
- Monkeys, Go Home! (1967) - Fontanino
- Double Trouble (1967) - Frenchman
- Caprice (1967) - Auber
- How Do I Love Thee? (1970) - The Bishop
- The Poseidon Adventure (1972) - French naval officer (uncredited)
- Herbie Rides Again (1974) - French Waiter
- Cannon (1974) - Maitre'd (season 4 episode "The Sound of Silence")
- Barnaby Jones (1974–77) - Armand La Valle (season 3 episode "Time to Kill") and Michel (season 6 episode "The Damocles Gun")
- The Rockford Files (1977) - Chief Inspector Giono (season 4 episode "Irving the Explainer")
- The New Avengers (1977) - LeParge (season 2 episode "The Lion and the Unicorn") and General Gaspard (season 2 episodes "K Is For Kill: The Tiger Awakes" and "K Is For Kill: Tiger By the Tail")
- Missile X: The Neutron Bomb Incident (1979) - Russian general
- The Jerk (1979) - French waiter
- The Big Red One (1980) - Vichy colonel
- Hart to Hart (1981-1982, TV series) - Andre / Inspector Novier / Bechet
- Deal of the Century (1983) - Frenchman
- The Fall Guy (1986) - (season 5 episode "The Lady in Green")
- Dragnet (1987) - Maitre d' (final film role)
