= Paolo Heusch =

Italian film director (1924–1982)

- Born: 26 February 1924; Rome, Italy
- Died: 16 October 1982 (aged 58)
- Occupations: Film director Screenwriter
- Years active: 1949-1975

Paolo Heusch (26 February 1924 – 16 October 1982) was an Italian film director and screenwriter.

== Life and career ==
Born in Rome, Heush started his career immediately after the World War II as a script supervisor. Between 1949 and 1957 he was active as an assistant director for over twenty films. After directing a number of documentaries, he made his feature film debut in 1958 with The Day the Sky Exploded, the first science fiction film produced in Italy. His third film as a director was Werewolf in a Girls' Dormitory. He was then asked to co-direct Violent Life. based on Pier Paolo Pasolini's novel of the same name. He was hired by producer Moris Ergas to direct the film with Brunello Rondi as the produced wanted a technically gifted director to help the screenwriter direct his first film. Heusch was often brought on to co-direct films, and works that were credited to other filmmakers, such as The Commandant, Che fine ha fatto Toto baby? which is only credited to Ottavio Alessi and Toto d'Arabia which is credited to Jose Antonio de la Loma. Heusch continued to work in other genres including heist films, adventures, and erotic dramas in the 1960s. Heusch's last uncredited work was shooting some extra scenes for Massimo Dallamano's Venus in Furs for its 1975 re-release.

Heusch died in 1982 at the age of 58.

== Selected filmography ==
- Alarm Bells (1949 - screenwriter)
- The Day the Sky Exploded (1958)
- The Defeated Victor (1958)
- Werewolf in a Girls' Dormitory (1961)
- Violent Life (1961)
- The Commandant (1963)
- A Stroke of 1000 Millions (1966)
- Bali (1970)
