= Barbara Kwiatkowska-Lass =

Polish actress (1940–1995)

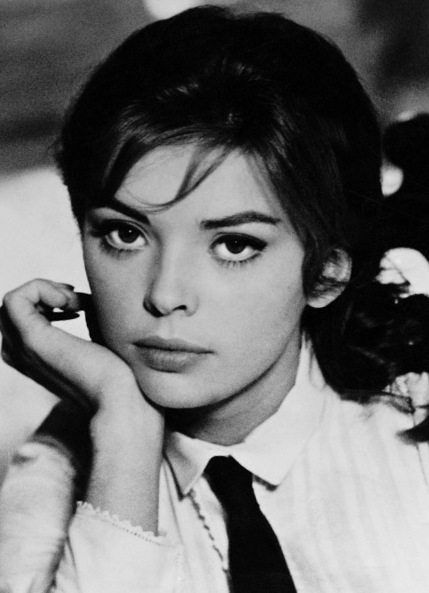
- Born: Barbara Kwiatkowska; 1 June 1940; Patrowo near Gostynin, German-occupied Poland
- Died: 6 March 1995 (aged 54); Munich, Bavaria, Germany
- Resting place: Rakowicki Cemetery, Kraków, Poland
- Other names: Barbara Lass; Barbara Kwiatkowska; Barbara Kwiatkowski
- Occupation: Actress
- Years active: 1958–1995
- Spouses: Roman Polanski (m. 1959; div. 1962) Karlheinz Böhm (m. 1963; div. 1980) Leszek Żądło (m. 1980)
- Children: Katharina Böhm

Barbara Kwiatkowska-Lass (1 June 1940 – 6 March 1995) was a Polish actress.

== Early life and career ==
Barbara Kwiatkowska was born in Patrowo, a village near Gostynin in central Poland, then under German-occupied Poland, which the Germans had renamed Gasten in 1939 through 1941 (at time of her birth). Then changed to Walrode from June 1941 until the end of the war. Although she received ballet and dance education, she eventually took up an acting career. After her debut role in Tadeusz Chmielewski's comedy Ewa chce spać (1957) she gained wider popularity in Poland. The role had been offered to her after she took the first place in a contest organized by a popular Polish cinema magazine.

In 1959 she left Poland for the West and soon starred in a few major films like La millième fenêtre (with Jean-Louis Trintignant) and The Joy of Living (with Alain Delon). She played roles in several Italian, French and German films such as Krzysztof Zanussi's Bluebeard (1984) and in Sting in the Flesh (1981).

== Personal life ==
She married film director Roman Polanski in 1959; they divorced in 1962. The following year she met Karlheinz Böhm in Tokyo on the set of the film Rififi in Tokyo (1963); the couple later married, their daughter is actress Katharina Böhm. Kwiatkowska-Lass divorced Böhm in 1980, and married Polish jazz musician Leszek Żądło, with whom she lived until her death.

=== Politics ===
Kwiatkowska was opposed to the Communist regime in Poland and cooperated with the United States-controlled Radio Free Europe/Radio Liberty, which transmitted anti-communist propaganda, information and programmes free from censorship to Poland.

== Death ==
On 6 March 1995, Kwiatkowska-Lass collapsed and died from a brain hemorrhage, aged 54, in Munich. She was interred in Kraków's Rakowicki Cemetery.

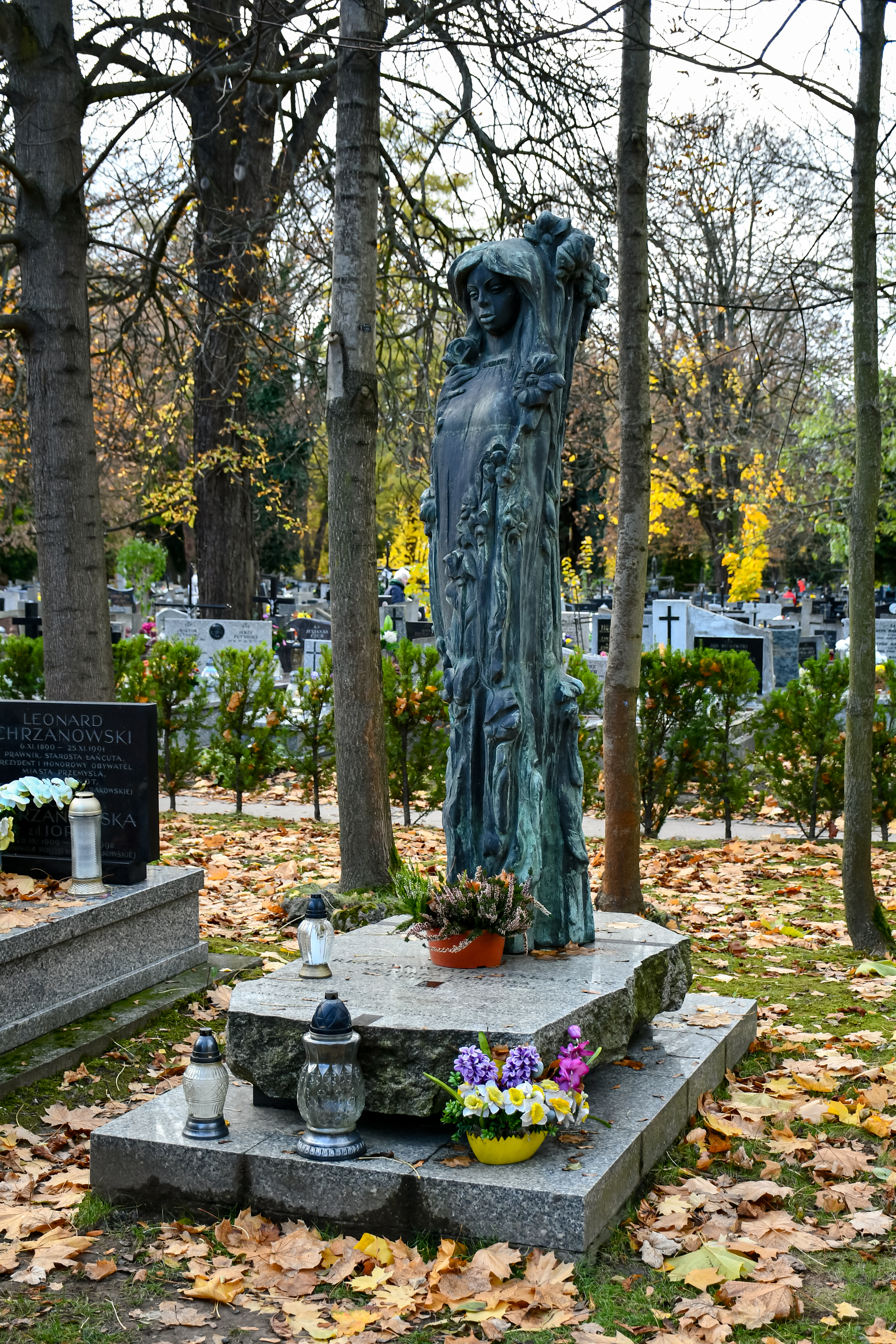
Tomb of Barbara Kwiatkowska-Lass Rakowicki Cemetery, 26 Rakowicka Street, Kraków

== Filmography ==
Film
Year	Title	Role	Notes
1958	Ewa chce spać	Ewa Bonecka	Credited as Barbara Kwiatkowska
1958	Żołnierz królowej Madagaskaru	Sabinka Lemiecka	
1958	Pan Anatol szuka miliona	Iwona Slowikowska	
1959	When Angels Fall		Short, Alternative title: Gdy spadają anioły Credited as Barbara Kwiatkowska
1960	Tysiąc talarów	Kasia Wydech	
1960	Zezowate szczeście	Jola Wrona-Wronska	Alternative title: Bad Luck; Credited as Barbara Kwiatkowska
1960	La 1000eme fenêtre	Ania	
1961	Ostroznie, Yeti!	Bride	
1961	Che gioia vivere	Franca Fossati	Alternative title: The Joy of Living
1961	Lycanthropus	Priscilla	Alternative title: Werewolf in a Girls' Dormitory
1962	L'Amour à vingt ans	Basia	Alternative title: Love at Twenty (segment "Warszawa")
1963	Vice and Virtue	Prisoner	
1963	Rififi in Tokyo	Françoise Merigne	Alternative title: Rififi in Tokyo
1965	Serenade für zwei Spione	Tamara	Alternative title: Serenade for Two Spies
1967	Jowita	Agnieszka "Jowita"	Credited as Barbara Kwiatkowska
1970	Der Pfarrer von St. Pauli	Dagmar	Alternative title: The Priest of St. Pauli
1974	Effi Briest	Polnische Köchin	
1974	Jak to sie robi	Holiday-Maker	Alternative title: How It's Done
1981	Sting in the Flesh	Ines	
1986	Rosa Luxemburg	Rosa's mother	
1986	The Silence of the Poet	Janina	
Television
Year	Title	Role	Notes
1970	Hauser's Memory	Angelika	TV movie
1972	Doppelspiel in Paris	Renée Borni, seine Geliebte	TV movie
1984	Bluebeard	Rosalinde	TV movie
1990	Wahnsinnsehe	Herta	TV movie
1991	Moskau - Petuschki	Fürstin	TV movie, (final film role)
