= The Joy of Living (film) =

1961 French-Italian film by René Clément

- Film poster
- Directed by: René Clément
- Written by: Leonardo Benvenuti; Pierre Bost; René Clément; Piero De Bernardi; Gualtiero Jacopetti
- Produced by: Robert Chabert
- Starring: Alain Delon
- Cinematography: Henri Decaë
- Music by: Angelo Francesco Lavagnino
- Distributed by: Cinédis
- Release date: May 1961
- Running time: 132 minutes
- Countries: Italy; France
- Language: Italian
- Box office: 1,091,442 admissions (France)

The Joy of Living (Italian: Che gioia vivere, French: Quelle joie de vivre) is a 1961 Italian-French comedy film directed by René Clément. It was entered into the 1961 Cannes Film Festival.

== Plot ==
The story is set in Rome, in the year 1921. Ulisse (Alain Delon) enrolls in the Italian Fascist party because he cannot find any employment. The first task entrusted to him by the party leads Ulysses to the printer Fossati, where he's hired as an apprentice. This brings him into contact with a family of anarchists, who will turn him into a reluctant hero for love of the beautiful Franca (Barbara Lass). However, at a time when he must make a decisive choice, Ulysses obeys neither the anarchists nor the fascists, and risks his life for a different idea of freedom.

== Cast ==
- Alain Delon as Ulisse Cecconato
- Barbara Lass as Franca Fossati
- Gino Cervi as Olinto Fossati
- Rina Morelli as Rosa Fossati
- Carlo Pisacane as Grandfather "Fossati"
- Paolo Stoppa as Hairdresser
- Giampiero Littera as Turiddu
- Didi Perego as Isabella
- Nanda Primavera
- Ugo Tognazzi as Anarchist
- Aroldo Tieri
- Leopoldo Trieste
- Gastone Moschin
