= André Utter =

French painter

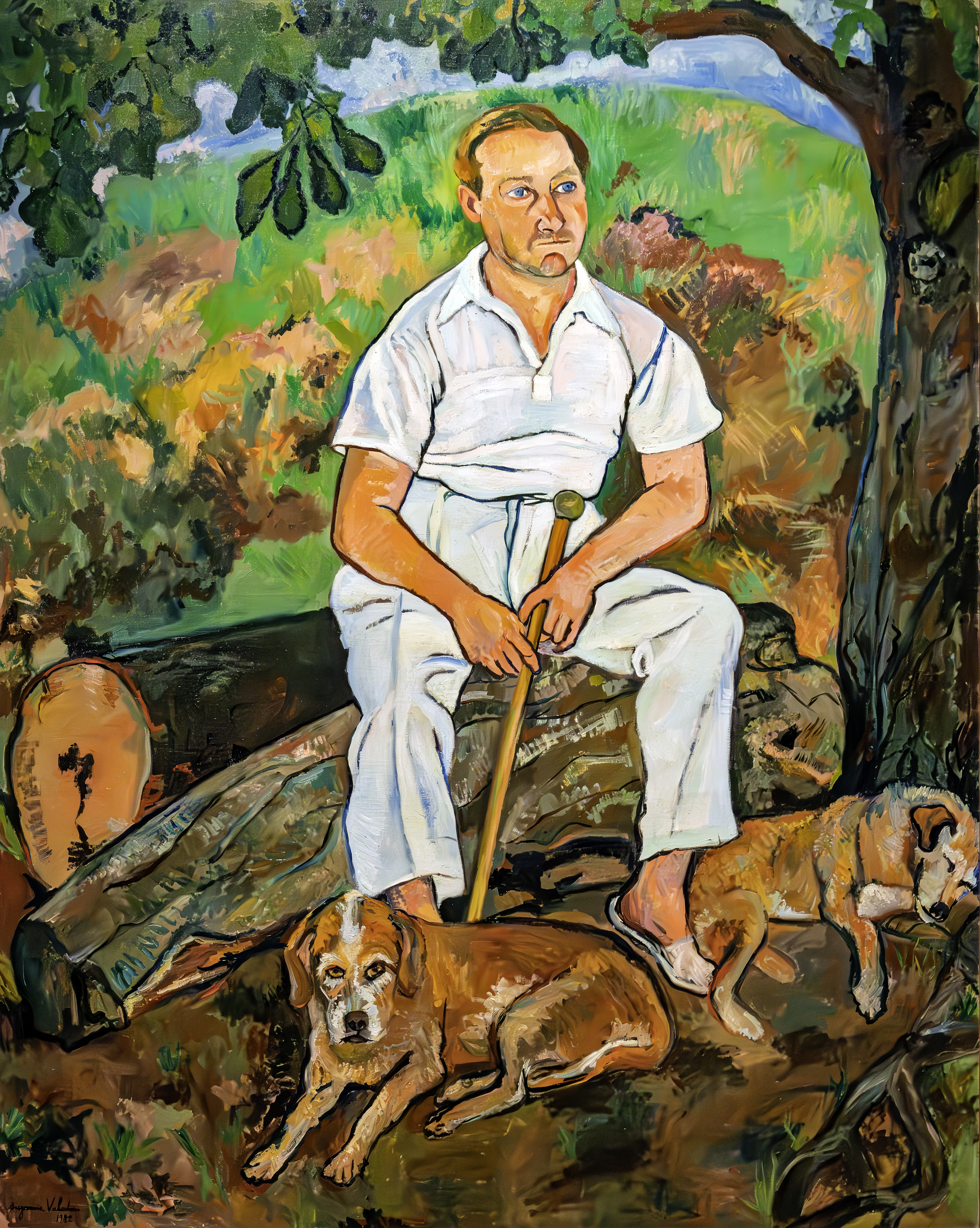
André Utter et ses chiens by Suzanne Valadon, 1932

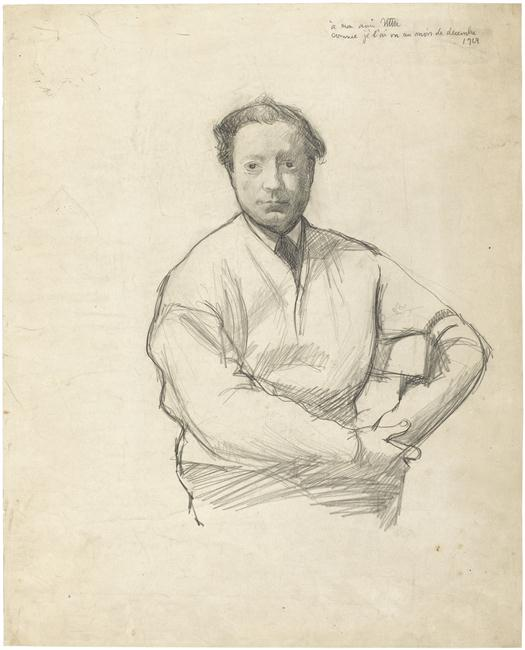
Portrait d'André Utter by Georges Kars, 1924

André Utter (20 March 1886 – 7 February 1948) was a French painter. He was born in the 18th arrondissement of Paris to parents of Alsatian origin. He is best known for having been the second husband and manager of French painter Suzanne Valadon and the step-father of her son, Maurice Utrillo. The trio have also been called the trinité maudite (cursed trinity) because of their quarrels, reconciliations, and alcoholism.

== Life ==
In 1906, Utter was introduced to Suzanne Valadon by his friend Maurice Utrillo, her son. Utter became her first male model, posing nude for her from 1909 to 1914. He is portrayed as Adam in Valadon's 1909 painting Adam et Ève.

Utter became Valadon's lover in 1913. The couple married shortly before Utter was drafted into World War I in 1914. When he returned to civilian life in 1918, he took over the management of the careers of both Valadon and Maurice Utrillo.

In 1934, the couple divorced; nonetheless, he remained part of her life until she died four years later. He is buried with Valadon in the Saint Ouen cemetery near Paris.

== Works ==
From 1910, Utter produced numerous landscape paintings, in particular, of rue Cortot where his studio was located. Inspired by cubism, his work took on a softer tone after World War I. After 1925, his work consisted mainly of portraits and still lifes. He also painted theatre sets. In 1925, he illustrated the "Théâtre à lire" by Oscar Wilde.

Between 1915 and 1922 and again from 1925 and 1932, he exhibited his work in several joint exhibitions in Paris, including in the gallery of Berthe Weill. Throughout their marriage, Utter regularly exhibited his work together with Suzanne Valadon. He had a solo exhibition in Geneva in 1932, but was not successful as a painter.

One of André Utter's best-known works is Suzanne Valadon se coiffant (Suzanne Valadon combing her hair), painted in 1913 and displayed in the Petit Palais museum in Geneva. Other works are displayed in many museums including the Brou Museum in Bourg-en-Bresse; the museum of Fine Arts in Lyon; the modern art museum of Troyes and the musée d'art Moderne et Contemporain in Strasbourg.

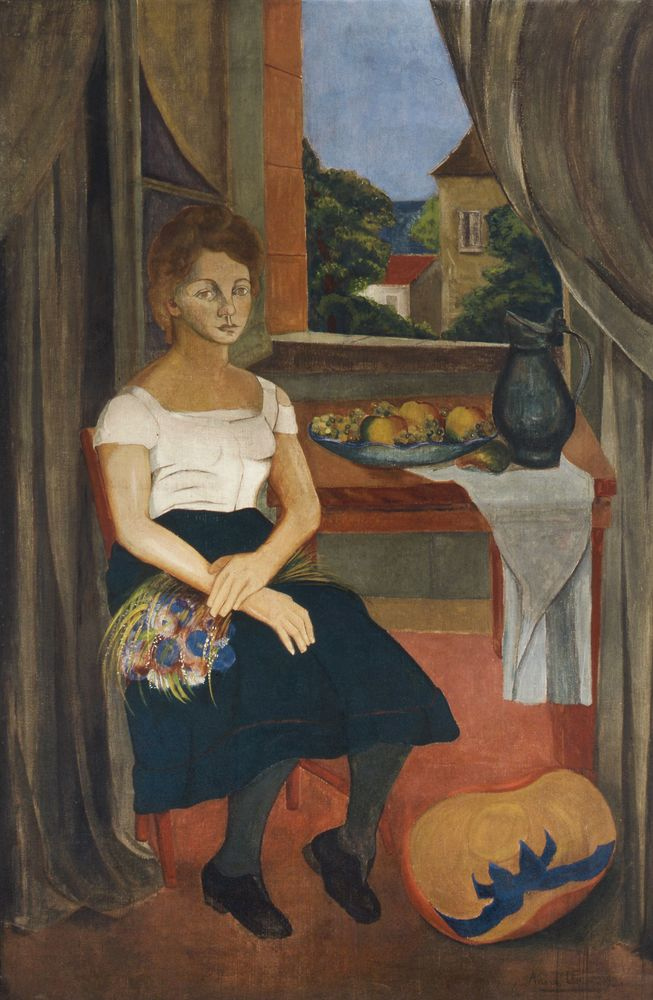
Portrait de Suzanne Valadon, by André Utter, 1921

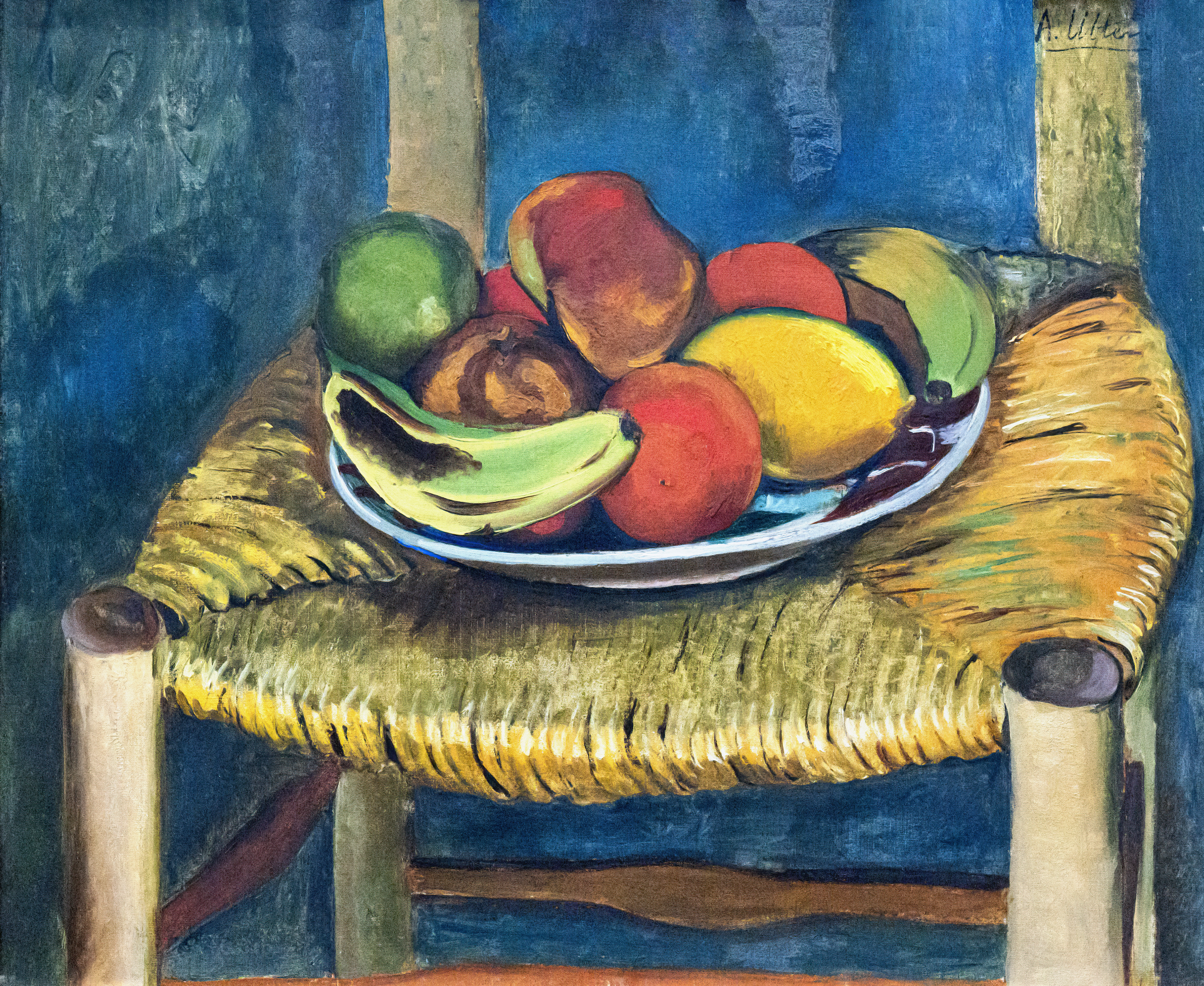
Nature morte au tabouret, by André Utter, Musée Toulouse-Lautrec Albi

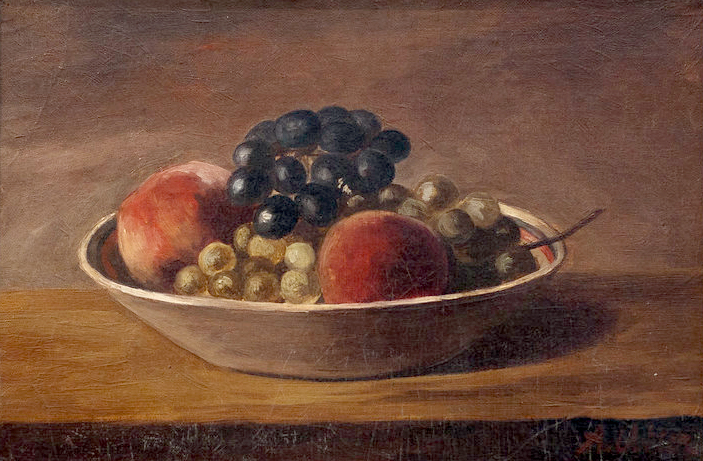
Coupe de fruits (1911), by André Utter, musée des Beaux-Arts de Brest

== Bibliography ==
- Beachboard, Robert (1952). La Trinité maudite : Valadon, Utter, Utrillo. Paris: Amiot-Dumont.
- Doll, Valeska (2001). Suzanne Valadon (1865 - 1938); Identitätskonstruktion im Spannungsfeld von Künstlermythen und Weiblichkeitsstereotypen. München. ISBN 978-3-8316-0036-6.
- Martine Willot, Bertrand Willot, Michèle Michy-Quizet, Alphonse Quizet et ses amis, 1955–2005, il y a cinquante ans disparaissaient Alphonse Quizet et Maurice Utrillo, La Vie d'artiste AWD, 2005 (ISBN 2-913639-05-4).
- Wilde, Oscar (1925). Théâtre à lire. Paris: André Delpeuch.
