= Cinema of Germany =

- Max Schreck as Count Orlok in the 1922 film Nosferatu. Critic and historian Kim Newman declared it as a film that set the template for the genre of horror film.
- No. of screens: 4,757 (2025)
  - Per capita: 6.2 per 100,000 (2011)
- Main distributors: Walt Disney (25.9%); Warner (17.7%); Constantin Film (12.8%); Sony Pictures (12.5%); Universal (12.3%)

Produced feature films (2025)
- Total: 237 (incl. int. co-prod.)
- Fictional: 149
- Documentary: 88

Number of admissions (2025)
- Total: 91,938,547
  - Per capita: 1.48 (2017)
- National films: 24,300,000 (27.4%)

Gross box office (2025)
- Total: €924 million

The cinema of Germany can be traced back to the late 19th century. The film industry in Germany made major technical and artistic contributions to early film, broadcasting and television technology. Babelsberg became a household synonym for the early 20th century film industry in Europe, similar to Hollywood later. Early German and German-speaking filmmakers and actors heavily contributed to early Hollywood, many of whom were Jewish refugees fleeing Nazi persecution.

Germany witnessed major changes to its identity during the 20th and 21st century. Those changes determined the periodisation of national cinema into a succession of distinct eras and movements.

German movies and German artists earned 230 Oscar nominations and 54 Oscar wins.

== History ==
=== 1895–1918 German Empire ===
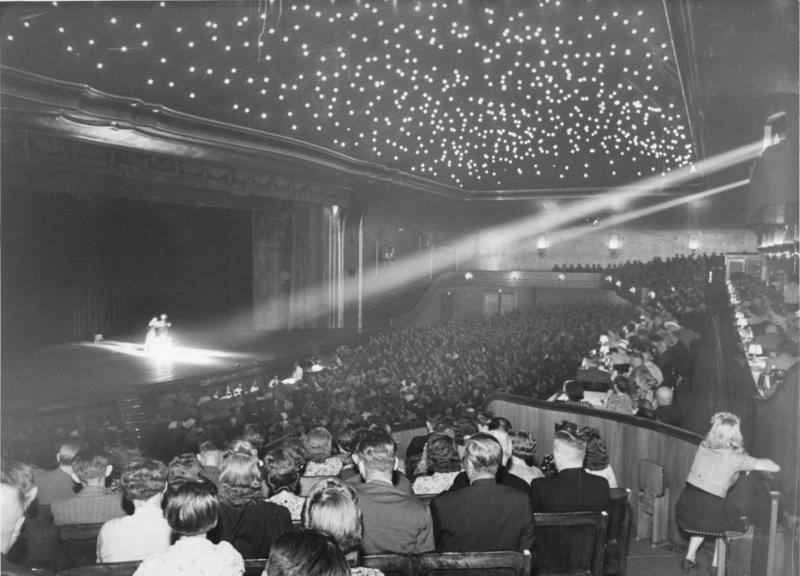
The Berlin Wintergarten theatre, here in 1940, was the site of the first cinema screening ever, with 8 short films presented by the Skladanowsky brothers on 1 November 1895.

The history of cinema in Germany can be traced back to the years of the medium's birth. Ottomar Anschütz held the first showing of life sized pictures in motion on 25 November 1894 at the Postfuhramt in Berlin. On 1 November 1895, Max Skladanowsky and his brother Emil demonstrated their self-invented film projector, the Bioscop, at the Wintergarten music hall in Berlin. A 15-minute series of eight short films were shown – the first screening of films to a paying audience. This performance pre-dated the first paying public display of the Lumière brothers' Cinematographe in Paris on 28 December of the same year, a performance that Max Skladanowsky attended and at which he was able to ascertain that the Cinematographe was technically superior to his Bioscop. Other German film pioneers included the Berliners Oskar Messter and Max Gliewe, two of several individuals who independently in 1896 first used a Geneva drive (which allows the film to be advanced intermittently one frame at a time) in a projector, and the cinematographer Guido Seeber.

In its earliest days, the cinematograph was perceived as an attraction for upper class audiences, but the novelty of moving pictures did not last long. Soon, trivial short films were being shown as fairground attractions aimed at the working class and lower-middle class. The booths in which these films were shown were known in Germany somewhat disparagingly as Kintopps. Film-makers with an artistic bent attempted to counter this view of cinema with longer films based on literary models, and the first German "artistic" films began to be produced from around 1910, an example being the Edgar Allan Poe adaptation The Student of Prague (1913) which was co-directed by Paul Wegener and Stellan Rye, photographed by Guido Seeber and starring actors from Max Reinhardt's company.

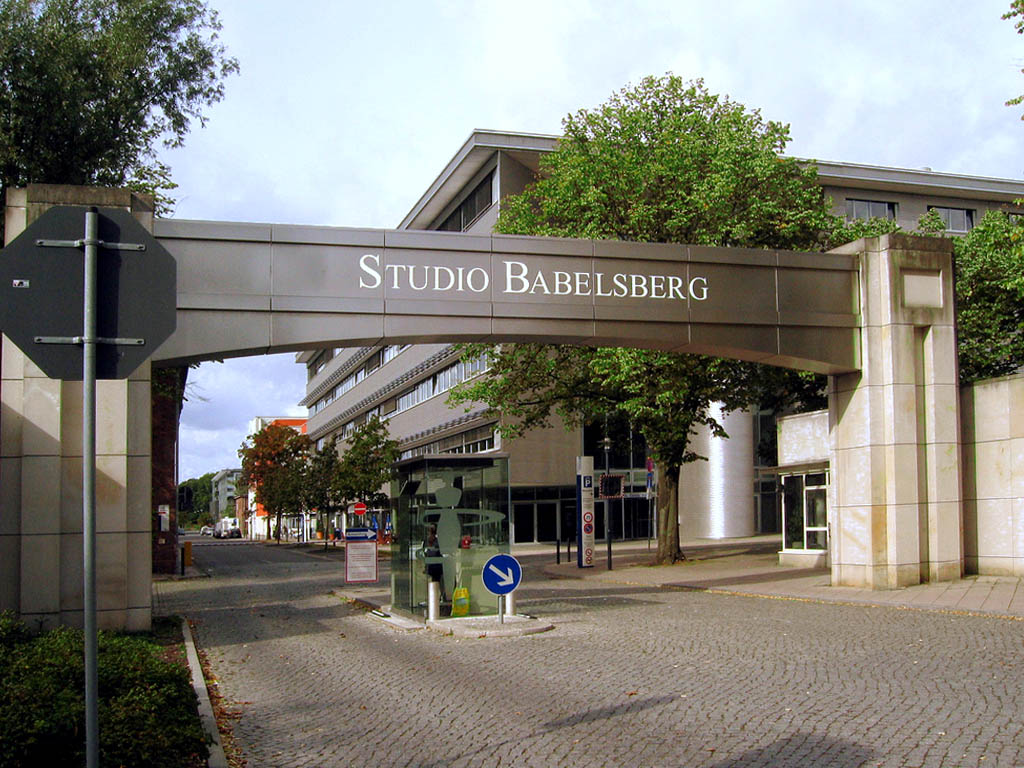
The Babelsberg Studio near Berlin was the first large-scale film studio in the world (founded 1912) and the forerunner to Hollywood. It still produces global blockbusters every year.

Early film theorists in Germany began to write about the significance of Schaulust, or "visual pleasure", for the audience, including the Dada movement writer Walter Serner: "If one looks to where cinema receives its ultimate power, into these strangely flickering eyes that point far back into human history, suddenly it stands there in all its massiveness: visual pleasure." Visually striking sets and makeup were key to the style of the expressionist films that were produced shortly after the First World War.

Cinemas themselves began to be established landmarks in the years immediately before World War I. Before this, German filmmakers would tour with their works, travelling from fairground to fairground. The earliest ongoing cinemas were set up in cafes and pubs by owners who saw a way of attracting more customers. The storefront cinema was called a Kientopp, and this is where films were viewed for the most part before the First World War broke out. The first standalone, dedicated cinema in Germany was opened in Mannheim in 1906, and by 1910, there were over 1000 cinemas operating in Germany. Henny Porten and Asta Nielsen (the latter originally from Denmark) were the first major film stars in Germany.

Prior to 1914, however, many foreign films were imported. In the era of the silent film there were no language boundaries and Danish and Italian films were particularly popular in Germany. The public's desire to see more films with particular actors led to the development in Germany, as elsewhere, of the phenomenon of the film star; the actress Henny Porten was one of the earliest German stars. Public desire to see popular film stories being continued encouraged the production of film serials, especially in the genre of mystery films, which is where the director Fritz Lang began his illustrious career.

The outbreak of World War I and the subsequent boycott of, for example, French films left a noticeable gap in the market. By 1916, there already existed some 2000 fixed venues for movie performances and initially film screenings were supplemented or even replaced by variety turns. In 1917 a process of concentration and partial nationalisation of the German film industry began with the founding of Universum Film AG (UFA), which was partly a reaction to the very effective use that the Allied Powers had found for the new medium for the purpose of propaganda. Under the aegis of the military, so-called Vaterland films were produced, which equalled the Allies' films in the matter of propaganda and disparagement of the enemy. Audiences however did not care to swallow the patriotic medicine without the accompanying sugar of the light-entertainment films which, consequently, Ufa also promoted. The German film industry soon became the largest in Europe.

=== 1918–1933 Weimar Republic ===
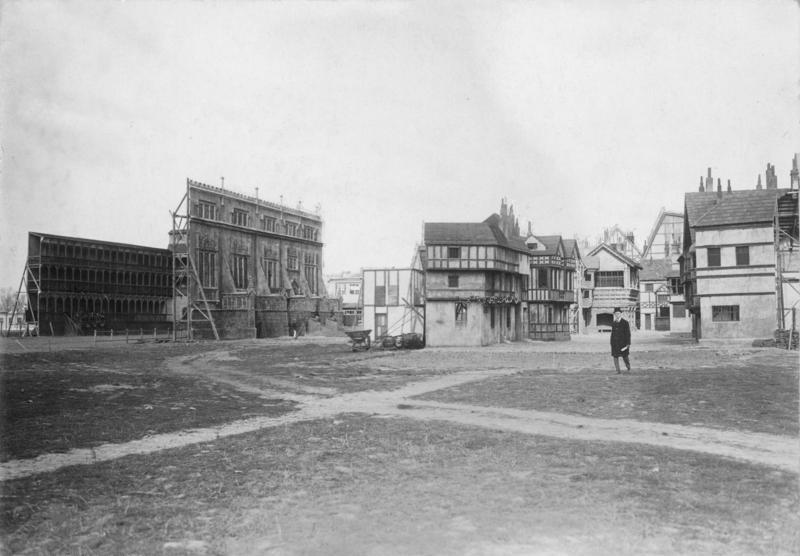
UFA Studios in Berlin-Tempelhof, 1920

The German film industry, which was protected during the war by the ban on foreign films import, became exposed at the end of the war to the international film industry while having to face an embargo, this time on its own films. Many countries banned the import of German films and audiences themselves were resisting anything that was "German". But the ban imposed on German films involved commercial considerations as well – as an American president of one of the film companies was quoted, "an influx of such films in the United States would throw thousands of our own... out of work, because it would be absolutely impossible for the American producers to compete with the German producers". At home, the German film industry confronted an unstable economic situation and the devaluation of the currency made it difficult for the smaller production companies to function. Film industry financing was a fragile business and expensive productions occasionally led to bankruptcy. In 1925 UFA itself was forced to go into a disadvantageous partnership called Parufamet with the American studios Paramount and MGM, before being taken over by the nationalist industrialist and newspaper owner Alfred Hugenberg in 1927.

Metropolis (1927), directed by Fritz Lang, first film to be inscribed on UNESCO's Memory of the World Register

Nevertheless, the German film industry enjoyed an unprecedented development – during the 14 years which comprise the Weimar period, an average of 250 film were being produced each year, a total of 3,500 full-feature films. Apart from UFA, about 230 film companies were active in Berlin alone. This industry was attracting producers and directors from all over Europe. The fact that the films were silent and language was not a factor, enabled even foreign actors, like the Danish film star Asta Nielsen or the American Louise Brooks, to be hired even for leading roles. This period can also be noted for new technological developments in film making and experimentation in set design and lighting, led by UFA. Babelsberg Studio, which was incorporated into UFA, expanded massively and gave the German film industry a highly developed infrastructure. Babelsberg remained the centre of German filmmaking for many years, became the largest film studio in Europe and produced most of the films in this "golden era" of German cinema. In essence it was "the German equivalent to Hollywood".

Films about an exaggerated version of Japanese culture that included "geishas, samurai, and Shinto shrines" were popular in Germany during this era.

Due to the unstable economic condition and in an attempt to deal with modest production budgets, filmmakers were trying to reach the largest audience possible and in that, to maximize their revenues. This led to films being made in a vast array of genres and styles.

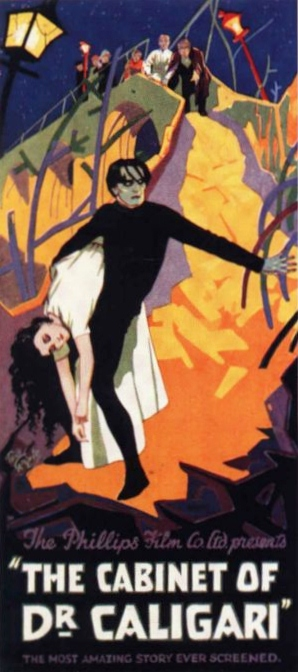
The Cabinet of Dr. Caligari (1920), directed by Robert Wiene, a major influence on film noir

One of the main film genres associated with the Weimar Republic cinema is German Expressionism which was inspired by the expressionist movement in art. Expressionist movies relied heavily on symbolism and artistic imagery rather than stark realism to tell their stories. Given the grim mood in post-World War I, it was not surprising that these films focused heavily on crime and horror. The film usually credited with sparking the popularity of expressionism is Robert Wiene's The Cabinet of Dr. Caligari (1920), produced by Erich Pommer. The film tells the story of a demented hypnotist who is using a sleepwalker to perform a series of murders. The film featured a dark and twisted visual style – the set was unrealistic with geometric images painted on the floor and shapes in light and shadow cast on walls, the acting was exaggerated and the costumes bizarre. These stylistic elements became trademarks of this cinematic movement. Other notable works of Expressionism are Friedrich Wilhelm Murnau's Nosferatu (1922), a classic period-piece horror film that remains the first feature-length film adaptation of Bram Stoker's Dracula, Carl Boese and Paul Wegener's The Golem: How He Came Into the World (1920), a Gothic retelling of the Jewish folktale, and Metropolis (1927), a legendary science-fiction epic directed by Fritz Lang. The Expressionist movement began to wane during the mid-1920s, but perhaps the fact that its main creators moved to Hollywood, California, allowed this style to remain influential in world cinema for years to come, particularly in American horror films and film noir and in the works of European directors such as Jean Cocteau and Ingmar Bergman.

Despite its significance, expressionist cinema was not the dominant genre of this era. Many other genres such as period dramas, melodramas, romantic comedies, and films of social and political nature, were much more prevalent and definitely more popular.

The "master" of period-dramas was undoubtedly Ernst Lubitsch. His most notable films of this genre were Madame Dubarry (1919) which portrayed King Louis XV of France's mistress, and Anna Boleyn (1920) on the tragic end of King Henry VIII's second wife. In these films, Lubitsch presented prominent historic personalities who are caught up by their weaknesses and petty urges and thus, ironically, become responsible for huge historical events. Despite modest budgets, his films included extravagant scenes which were meant to appeal to a wide audience and insure a wide international distribution.

As the genre of expressionism began to diminish, the genre of the New Objectivity (die neue Sachlichkeit) began to take its place. It was influenced by new issues which occupied the public in those years, as the rampant inflation caused deterioration in the economic status of the middle class. These films, often called "street films" or "asphalt films", tried to reflect reality in all its complexity and ugliness. They focused on objects surrounding the characters and cynically symbolized the despair felt by the German people, whose lives were shattered after the war. The most prominent film maker who is associated with this genre is Georg Wilhelm Pabst in his films such as: Joyless Street (1925), Pandora's Box (1929), and The Loves of Jeanne Ney (1927). Pabst is also credited with innovations in film editing, such as reversing the angle of the camera or cutting between two camera angles, which enhanced film continuity and later became standards of the industry.

Pabst is also identified with another genre which branched from the New Objectivity – that of social and political films. These filmmakers dared to confront sensitive and controversial social issues which engaged the public in those days; such as anti-Semitism, prostitution and homosexuality. To a large extent, Weimar cinema was playing a vibrant and important role by leading public debate on those issues. Pabst, in his film Diary of a Lost Girl (1929), tells the story of a young woman who has a child out of wedlock, is thrown out into the street by her family and has to resort to prostitution to survive. As early as 1919, Richard Oswald's film Different from the Others portrayed a man torn between his homosexual tendencies and the moral and social conventions. It is considered to be the first German film to deal with homosexuality and some researchers even believe it to be the first in the world to examine this issue explicitly. That same year, the film Ritual Murder (1919) by Jewish film producer Max Nivelli came to the screen. This film was the first to make the German public aware of the consequences of anti-Semitism and xenophobia. It portrayed a "pogrom" which is carried out against the Jewish inhabitants of a village in Tsarist Russia. In the background, a love story also evolves between a young Russian student and the daughter of the leader of the Jewish community, something that was considered a taboo at the time. Later on, in an attempt to reflect the rapidly growing anti-Semitic atmosphere, Oswald confronted the same issue with his film Dreyfus (1930), which portrayed the 1894 political scandal of the "Dreyfus affair", which until today remains one of the most striking examples of miscarriage of justice and blatant anti-Semitism.

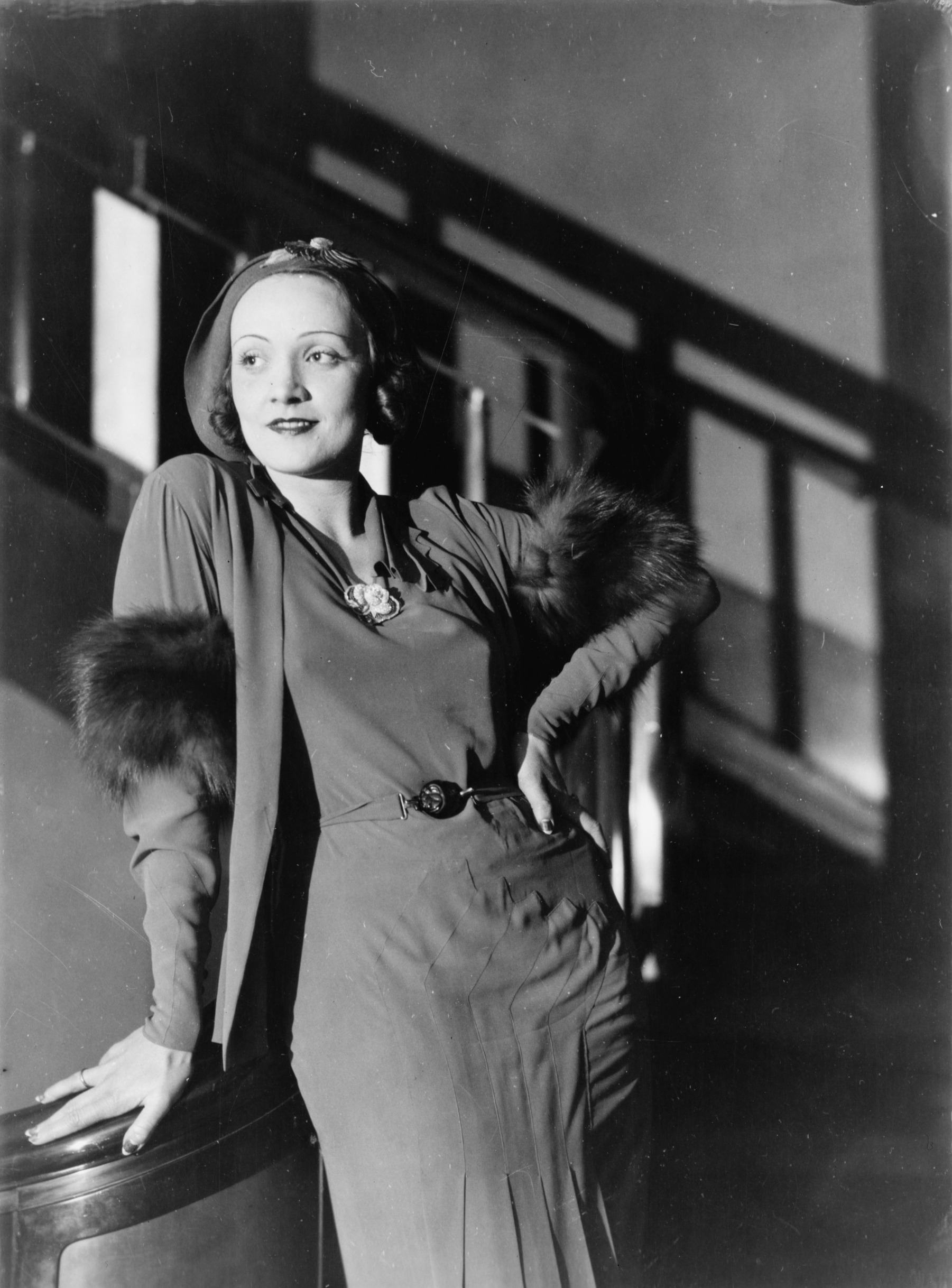
Marlene Dietrich, one of the biggest stars in German cinema history, was also a vocal figure in terms of politics.

The polarised politics of the Weimar period were also reflected in some of its films. A series of patriotic films about Prussian history, starring Otto Gebühr as Frederick the Great were produced throughout the 1920s and were popular with the nationalist right-wing, who strongly criticised the "asphalt" films' decadence. Another dark chapter of the Weimar period was reflected in Joseph Delmont's film Humanity Unleashed (1920). The film was an adaptation of a novel by the same name, written by Max Glass and published in 1919. The novel described a dark world consumed by disease and war. The filmmakers decided to take the story to a more contemporary context by reflecting the growing fear among the German public of political radicalization. They produced what was to become the first fictional account of the events of January 1919 in Berlin, the so-called "Spartacist Uprising". This film is also considered one of the anti-Bolshevik films of that era.

Another important film genre of the Weimar years was the Kammerspiel or "chamber drama", which was borrowed from the theater and developed by stage director, who would later become a film producer and director himself, Max Reinhardt. This style was in many ways a reaction against the spectacle of expressionism and thus tended to revolve around ordinary people from the lower-middle-class. Films of this genre were often called "instinct" films because they emphasized the impulses and intimate psychology of the characters. The sets were kept to a minimum and there was abundant use of camera movements to add complexity to the rather intimate and simple spaces. Associated with this particular style is also screenwriter Carl Mayer and films such as Murnau's The Last Laugh (1924).

The Adventures of Prince Achmed (1926), directed by Charlotte Reiniger, the oldest surviving animated feature film and first use of a multiplane camera

Nature films, a genre referred to as Bergfilm, also became popular. Most known in this category are the films by director Arnold Fanck, in which individuals were shown battling against nature in the mountains. Animators and directors of experimental films such as; Lotte Reiniger, Oskar Fischinger and Walter Ruttmann, were also very active in Germany in the 1920s. Ruttman's experimental documentary Berlin: Symphony of a Metropolis (1927) epitomised the energy of 1920s Berlin.

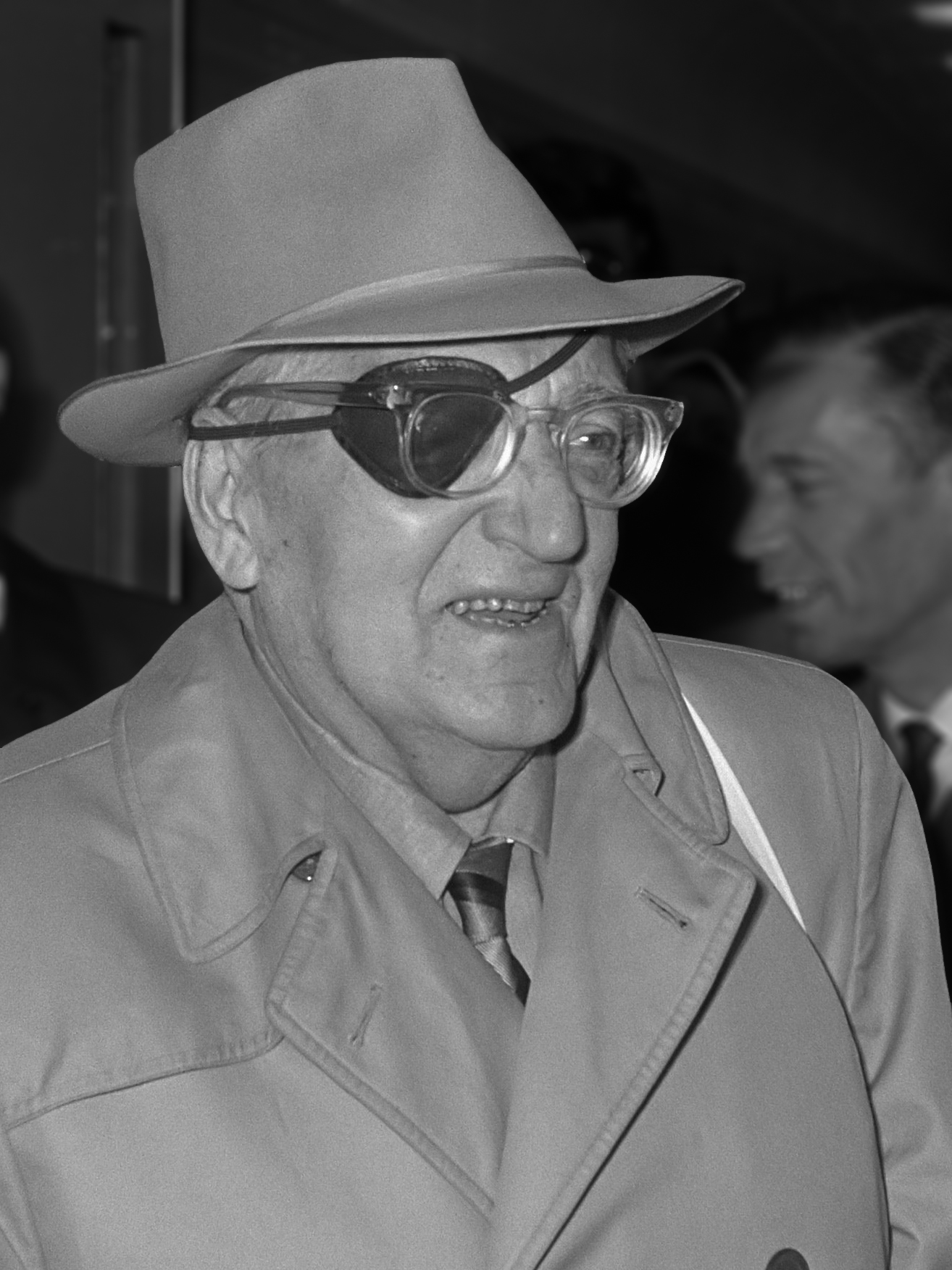
Fritz Lang, director of important German expressionist films like M from 1931, an indispensable influence on modern crime and thriller fiction

The arrival of sound at the very end of the 1920s, produced a final artistic flourish of German film before the collapse of the Weimar Republic in 1933. As early as 1918, three inventors came up with the Tri-Ergon sound-on-film system and tried to introduce it to the industry between 1922 and 1926. UFA showed an interest, but possibly due to financial difficulties, never made a sound film. But in the late 1920s, sound production and distribution were starting to be adopted by the German film industry and by 1932 Germany had 3,800 cinemas equipped to play sound films. The first filmmakers who experimented with the new technology often shot the film in several versions, using several soundtracks in different languages. The film The Blue Angel (1930), directed by the Austrian Josef von Sternberg and produced by Erich Pommer, was also shot in two versions – German and English, with a different supporting cast in each version. It is considered to be Germany's first "talkie" and will always be remembered as the film that made an international superstar of its lead actress Marlene Dietrich. Other notable early sound films, all from 1931, include Jutzi's adaptation to Alfred Döblin's novel Berlin Alexanderplatz, Pabst's Bertolt Brecht adaptation The Threepenny Opera and Lang's M, as well as Hochbaum's Raid in St. Pauli (1932). Brecht was also one of the creators of the explicitly communist film Kuhle Wampe (1932), which was banned soon after its release.

In addition to developments in the industry itself, the Weimar period saw the birth of film criticism as a serious discipline whose practitioners included Rudolf Arnheim in Die Weltbühne and in Film als Kunst (1932), Béla Balázs in Der Sichtbare Mensch (1924), Siegfried Kracauer in the Frankfurter Zeitung, and Lotte H. Eisner in the Filmkurier. German cinema developed into an identity shaped by the cultural instability, modernization, and the aftermath of World War I. distorted perspectives, and dramatic uses of lights and shadows. These tricks were used to show the psychological tension and anxiety in the films such as The Cabinet of Dr. Caligari and Nosferatu. Film historian Lotte Eisner argues that the Expressionist style was deeply influenced by German Romanticism and by innovations of director Max Reinhardt, whose emphasis on atmosphere and lighting shaped the visuals of early cinema. Siegfried Kracauer similarly interpreted Weimar films as reflections of the nation’s collective psychological state. In From Caligari to Hitler, he emphasizes the recurring themes of authority, fear, and disorder shown in films of the 1920s revealed the underlying fears that later contributed to the rise of authoritarian politics in Germany.

This era was also was marked by the uses of light and shadow that continued beyond Expressionism. Weimar filmmakers developed a visual way to express things with lighting techniques that reflected broader cultural and psychological conditions. these contrasts between illumination and darkness were not aesthetic choices but were to show the deeper meanings that were related to the uncertainty the country felt, and the shifting social identities. The Harvard Film Archive’s program emphasizes how the films of this period captured a society in crisis combining the artistic experimentation with themes of lack of control, social unrest, and the underlying psychological aspects that foreshadowed the rise of Nazism. The legacy of Weimar era filmmaking spreads into later movements as well such as noir lighting. it just shows how the stylistic techniques in 1920s German cinema especially the use of shadows, urban alienation, and how expressionism resurfaced in American noir of the 1940s and beyond. Despite the things caused by the Nazi period, The Weimar Republic remains one of the most influential points in film history. Its innovations in visual style, narrative experimentation, and cultural commentary continue to shape the way scholars and filmmakers understand cinema’s artistic possibilities.

=== 1933–1945 Nazi Germany ===
The uncertain economic and political situation in Weimar Germany had already led to a number of film-makers and performers leaving the country, primarily for the United States; Ernst Lubitsch moved to Hollywood as early as 1923, the Hungarian-born Michael Curtiz in 1926. Some 1,500 directors, producers, actors and other film professionals emigrated in the years after the Nazis came to power. Among them were such key figures as the producer Erich Pommer, the studio head of Ufa, stars Marlene Dietrich and Peter Lorre, and director Fritz Lang. Lang's exodus to America is legendary; it is said that Metropolis so greatly impressed Joseph Goebbels that he asked Lang to become the head of his propaganda film unit. Lang fled to America instead, where he had a long and prosperous career. Many up-and-coming German directors also fled to the U.S., having a major influence on American film as a result. A number of the Universal Horror films of the 1930s were directed by German emigrees, including Karl Freund, Joe May and Robert Siodmak. Directors Edgar Ulmer and Douglas Sirk and the Austrian-born screenwriter (and later director) Billy Wilder also emigrated from Nazi Germany to Hollywood success. Not all those in the film industry threatened by the Nazi regime were able to escape; the actor and director Kurt Gerron, for example, perished in a concentration camp.

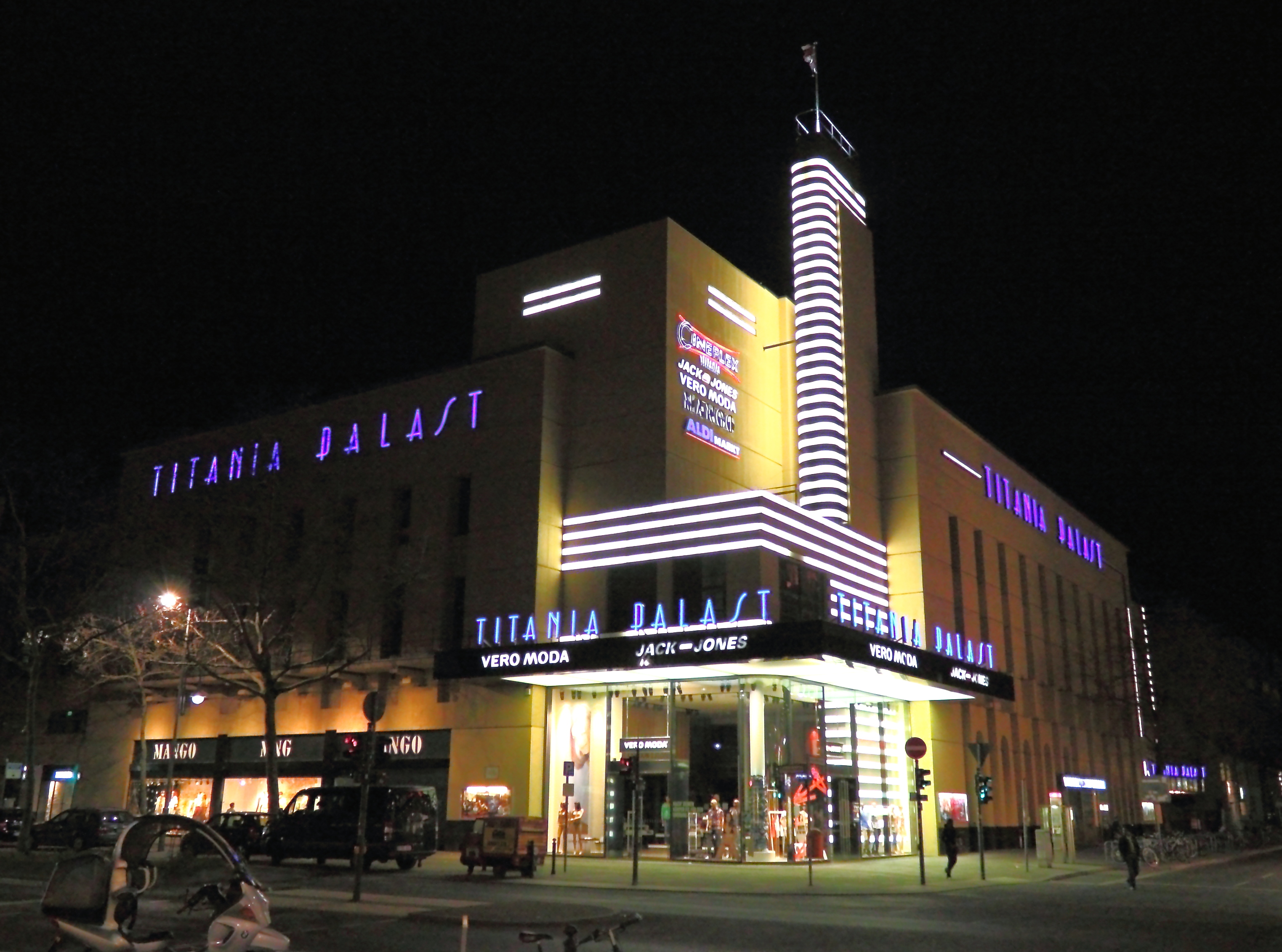
The Titania-Palast in Berlin-Steglitz, an Art Deco style movie theater opened in 1928

Within weeks of the Machtergreifung, Alfred Hugenberg had effectively turned over Ufa to the ends of the Nazis, excluding Jews from employment in the company in March 1933, several months before the foundation in June of the Reichsfilmkammer (Reich Chamber of Film), the body of the Nazi state charged with control of the film industry, which marked the official exclusion of Jews and foreigners from employment in the German film industry. As part of the process of Gleichschaltung all film production in Germany was subordinate to the Reichsfilmkammer, which was directly responsible to Goebbel's Propaganda ministry, and all those employed in the industry had to be members of the Reichsfachschaft Film. "Non-Aryan" film professionals and those whose politics or personal life were unacceptable to the Nazis were excluded from the Reichsfachschaft and thus denied employment in the industry. Some 3,000 individuals were affected by this employment ban. In addition, as journalists were also organised as a division of the Propaganda Ministry, Goebbels was able to abolish film criticism in 1936 and replace it with Filmbeobachtung (film observation); journalists could only report on the content of a film, not offer judgement on its artistic or other worth.

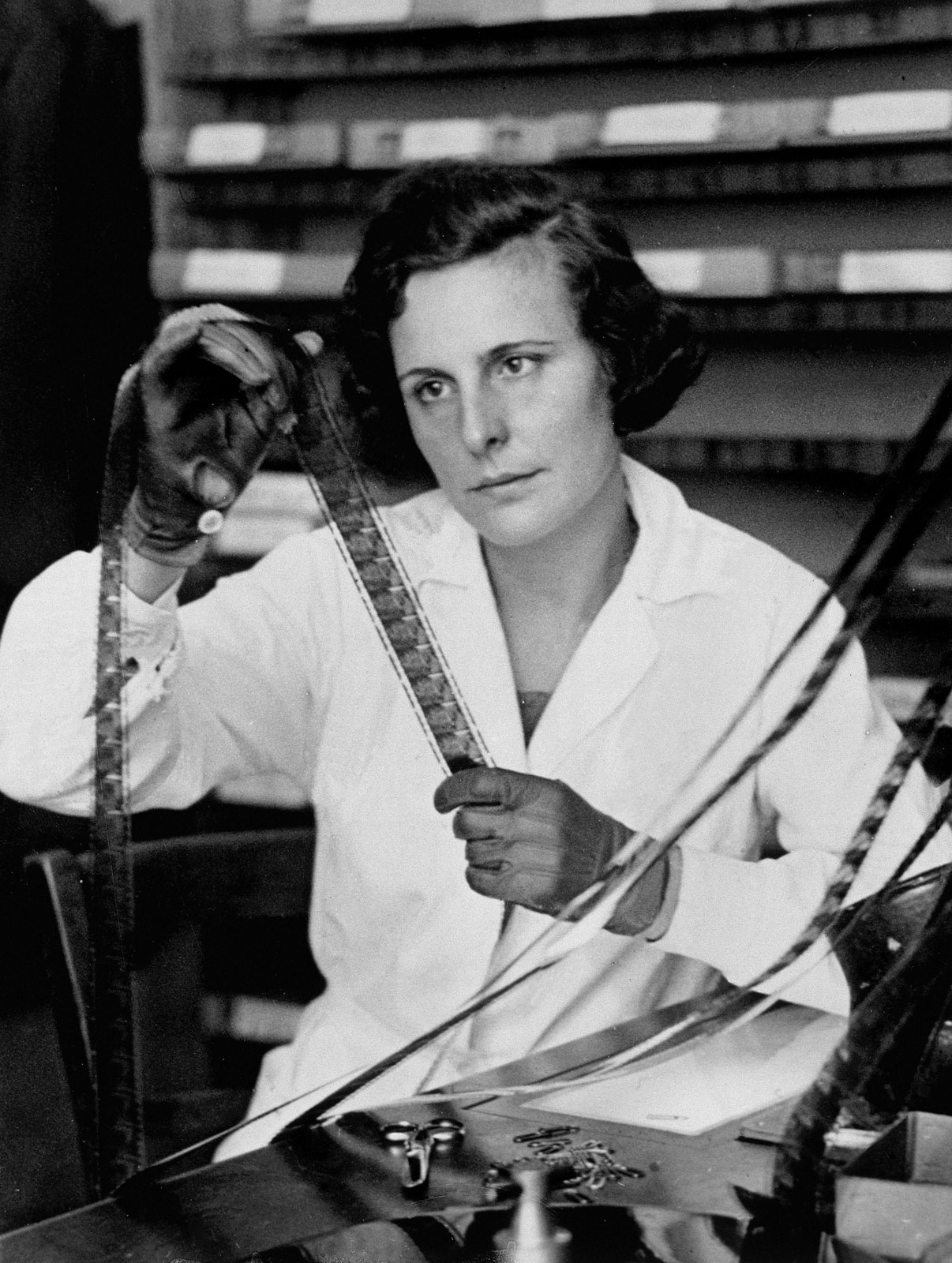
Leni Riefenstahl was a major director in Nazi Germany. Her film Olympia from 1938 about the 1936 Summer Olympics had a major impact on modern sports coverage

With the German film industry now effectively an arm of the totalitarian state, no films could be made that were not ostensibly in accord with the views of the ruling regime. However, despite the existence of anti-semitic propaganda works such as The Eternal Jew (1940)—which was a box-office flop—and the more sophisticated but equally anti-semitic Jud Süß (1940), which achieved commercial success at home and elsewhere in Europe, the majority of German films from the National Socialist period were intended principally as works of entertainment. The import of foreign films was legally restricted after 1936 and the German industry, which was effectively nationalised in 1937, had to make up for the missing foreign films (above all American productions). Entertainment also became increasingly important in the later years of World War II when the cinema provided a distraction from Allied bombing and a string of German defeats. In both 1943 and 1944 cinema admissions in Germany exceeded a billion, and the biggest box office hits of the war years were Die große Liebe (1942) and Wunschkonzert (1941), which both combine elements of the musical, wartime romance and patriotic propaganda, Frauen sind doch bessere Diplomaten (1941), a comic musical which was one of the earliest German films in colour, and Vienna Blood (1942), the adaptation of a Johann Strauß comic operetta. Titanic (1943) was another big-budget epic that arguably inspired other films about the ill-fated ocean liner. The importance of the cinema as a tool of the state, both for its propaganda value and its ability to keep the populace entertained, can be seen in the filming history of Veit Harlan's Kolberg (1945), the most expensive film of the Nazi era, for the shooting of which tens of thousands of soldiers were diverted from their military positions to appear as extras.

Despite the emigration of many film-makers and the political restrictions, the period was not without technical and aesthetic innovations, the introduction of Agfacolor film production being a notable example. Technical and aesthetic achievement could also be turned to the specific ends of the Nazi state, most spectacularly in the work of Leni Riefenstahl. Riefenstahl's Triumph of the Will (1935), documenting the 1934 Nuremberg Rally, and Olympia (1938), documenting the 1936 Summer Olympics, pioneered techniques of camera movement and editing that have influenced many later films. Both films, particularly Triumph of the Will, remain highly controversial, as their aesthetic merit is inseparable from their propagandising of Nazi ideals.

=== 1945–1989 East Germany ===
East German cinema initially profited from the fact that much of the country's film infrastructure, notably the former UFA studios, lay in the Soviet occupation zone which enabled film production to get off the ground more quickly than in the Western sectors. The authorities in the Soviet Zone were keen to re-establish the film industry in their sector and an order was issued to re-open cinemas in Berlin in May 1945 within three weeks of German capitulation. The film production company DEFA was founded on 17 May 1946, and took control of the film production facilities in the Soviet Zone which had been confiscated by order of the Soviet Military Administration in Germany in October 1945. A joint-stock company on paper, the majority interest in DEFA was actually held by the Socialist Unity Party of Germany (SED) which became the ruling party of the German Democratic Republic (GDR) after 1949, formally placing DEFA as the state-owned monopoly for film production in East Germany. A sister "company", Progress Film, had also been established as a similar monopoly for domestic film distribution, its principal "competition" being Sovexportfilm, which handled distribution of Soviet films.

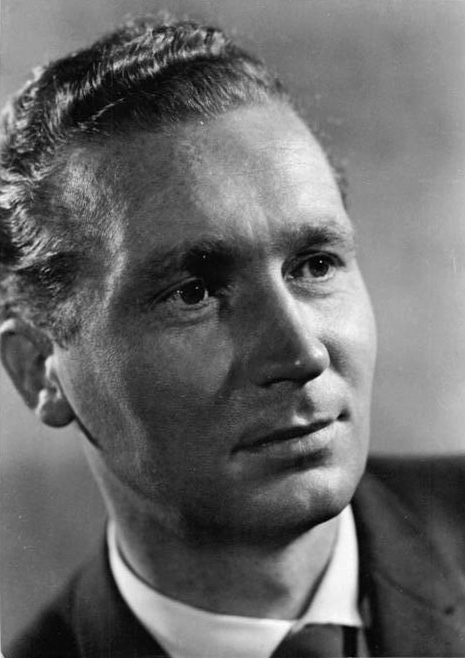
Frank Beyer, director of Jacob the Liar (1975), the only East German film ever nominated for an Academy Award

In total, DEFA produced some 900 feature films during its existence as well as around 800 animated films and over 3000 documentaries and short films. In 1946 DEFA produced The Murderers are Among Us, which was the first German film released after World War II and created the groundwork for the so-called Trümmerfilme, or rubble films, which were filmed amidst the rubble of structures bombed during World War II. Early on, production of East German film was limited due to strict controls imposed by the authorities which restricted the subject-matter of films to topics that directly contributed to the Communist project of the state. Excluding newsreels and educational films, only 50 films were produced between 1948 and 1953. However, in later years numerous films were produced on a variety of themes. DEFA had particular strengths in children's films, notably fairy tale adaptations such as Drei Haselnüsse für Aschenbrödel (Three Hazelnuts for Cinderella) (1973), but it also attempted other genre works: science-fiction, for example Der schweigende Stern (The Silent Star) (1960), an adaptation of a Stanisław Lem novel, or "red westerns" such as The Sons of the Great Mother Bear (1966) in which, in contrast to the typical American western, the heroes tended to be Native Americans. Many of these genre films were co-productions with other Warsaw Pact countries.

Notable non-genre films produced by DEFA include Wolfgang Staudte's adaptation of Heinrich Mann's Der Untertan (1951); Konrad Wolf's Der geteilte Himmel (Divided Heaven) (1964), an adaptation of Christa Wolf's novel; Frank Beyer's adaptation of Jurek Becker's Jacob the Liar (1975), the only East German film to be nominated for an Oscar; The Legend of Paul and Paula (1973), directed by Heiner Carow from Ulrich Plenzdorf's novel; and Solo Sunny (1980), again the work of Konrad Wolf.

However, film-making in the GDR was always constrained and oriented by the political situation in the country at any given time. Ernst Thälmann, the communist leader in the Weimar period, was the subject of several hagiographical films in the 1950s (Ernst Thälmann, 1954), and although East German filmmaking moved away from this overtly Stalinist approach in the 1960s, filmmakers were still subject to the changing political positions, and indeed the whims, of the SED leadership. For example, DEFA's full slate of contemporary films from 1966 were denied distribution, among them Frank Beyer's Traces of Stones (1966) which was pulled from distribution after three days, not because it was antipathetic to communist principles, but because it showed that such principles, which it fostered, were not put into practice at all times in East Germany. The huge box-office hit The Legend of Paul and Paula was initially threatened with a distribution ban because of its satirical elements and supposedly only allowed a release on the say-so of Party General Secretary Erich Honecker.

In the late 1970s, numerous film-makers left the GDR for the West as a result of restrictions on their work, among them director Egon Günther and actors Angelica Domröse, Eva-Maria Hagen, Katharina Thalbach, Hilmar Thate, Manfred Krug and Armin Mueller-Stahl. Many had been signatories of a 1976 petition opposing the expatriation of socially critical singer-songwriter Wolf Biermann and had had their ability to work restricted as a result.

In the final years of the GDR, the availability of television and the programming and films on television broadcasts reaching into the GDR via the uncontrollable airwaves, reduced the influence of DEFA productions, although its continuing role in producing shows for East German television channel remained. Following the Wende, DEFA had ceased production altogether, and its studios and equipment was sold off by the Treuhand in 1992, but its intellectual property rights were handed to the charitable DEFA-Stiftung (DEFA Foundation) which exploits these rights in conjunction with a series of private companies, especially the quickly privatized Progress Film GmbH, which has issued several East German films with English subtitles since the mid-1990s.

=== 1945–1989 West Germany ===
==== 1945–1960 Reconstruction ====
The occupation and reconstruction of Germany by the Four Powers in the period immediately after the end of World War II brought a major and long-lasting change to the economic conditions under which the industry in Germany had previously operated. The holdings of Ufa were confiscated by the Allies and, as part of the process of decartelisation, licences to produce films were shared between a range of much smaller companies. In addition, the Occupation Statute of 1949, which granted partial independence to the newly created Federal Republic of Germany, specifically forbade the imposition of import quotas to protect German film production from foreign competition, the result of lobbying by the American industry as represented by the MPAA.

The postwar Western Allied military government's Information Control Division (ICD) authorized the film industry to return slower than all other media. It did not license new production during the first year of occupation, in part because of the shortage of film stock and equipment. Movie exhibitors also had to be licensed, and more than 80% of them had been Nazi party members which ICD did not want to again profit from films. The first 15 theaters reopened in July 1945 to show newsreels such as Welt im Film; 350 were open by the end of the year. Amidst the devastation of the Stunde Null year of 1945 cinema attendance was unsurprisingly down to a fraction of its wartime heights, but already by the end of the decade it had reached levels that exceeded the pre-war period.

For the first time in many years, German audiences had free access to cinema from around the world and in this period the films of Charlie Chaplin remained popular, as were melodramas from the United States. Nonetheless, the share of the film market for German films in this period and into the 1950s remained relatively large, taking up some 40 percent of the total market. American films took up around 30 percent of the market despite having around twice as many films in distribution as the German industry in the same time frame. After the mediocre Operetta had 60% larger audiences than American films, ICD required theaters to show American films for two weeks before and after a German film. It wanted to propagate a positive view of the West so, for example, quickly withdrew from circulation The Maltese Falcon, which seemed to support Nazi rhetoric about American decadence.

Many of the German films of the immediate post-war period can be characterised as belonging to the genre of the Trümmerfilm (literally "rubble film"). These films show strong affinities with the work of Italian neorealists, not least Roberto Rossellini's neorealist trilogy which included Germany Year Zero (1948), and are concerned primarily with day-to-day life in the devastated Germany and an initial reaction to the events of the Nazi period (the full horror of which was first experienced by many in documentary footage from liberated concentration camps). Such films include Wolfgang Staudte's Die Mörder sind unter uns (The Murderers are among us) (1946), the first film made in post-war Germany (produced in the soviet sector), and Wolfgang Liebeneiner's Liebe 47 (Love 47) (1949), an adaptation of Wolfgang Borchert's play Draußen vor der Tür.

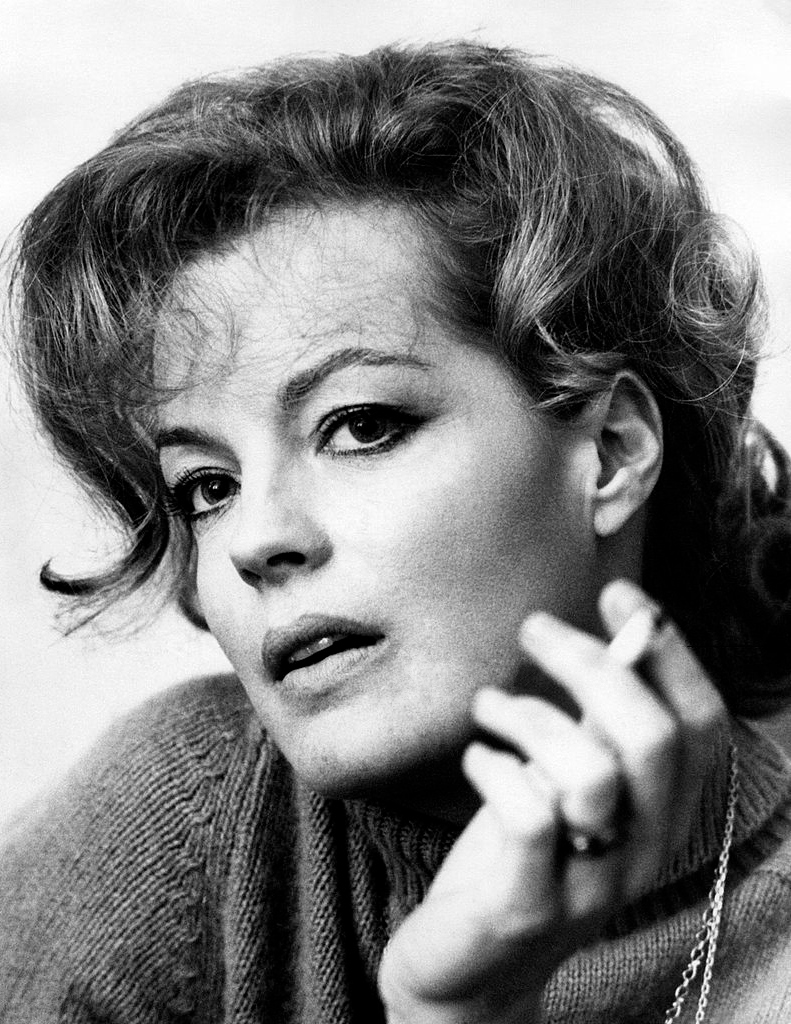
Romy Schneider, an early star of the Heimatfilm

Despite the advent of television service in the Federal Republic in 1952, cinema attendances continued to grow through much of the 1950s, reaching a peak of 817.5 million visits in 1956. The majority of the films of this period set out to do no more than entertain the audience and had few pretensions to artistry or active engagement with social issues. The defining genre of the period was arguably the Heimatfilm ("homeland film"), in which morally simplistic tales of love and family were played out in a rural setting, often in the mountains of Bavaria, Austria or Switzerland. In their day Heimatfilms were of little interest to more scholarly film critics, but in recent years they have been the subject of study in relation to what they say about the culture of West Germany in the years of the Wirtschaftswunder. Other film genres typical of this period were adaptations of operettas, hospital melodramas, comedies and musicals. Many films were remakes of earlier Ufa productions.

Rearmament and the founding of the Bundeswehr in 1955 brought with it a wave of war films which tended to depict the ordinary German soldiers of World War II as brave and apolitical. The Israeli historian Omer Bartov wrote that German films of the 1950s showed the average German soldier as a heroic victim: noble, tough, brave, honourable, and patriotic while fighting hard in a senseless war for a regime that he did not care for. The 08/15 trilogy of 1954–55 concerns a sensitive young German soldier who would rather play the piano than fight, and who fights on the Eastern Front without understanding why; however, no mention is made of the genocidal aspects of Germany's war in East. The last of the 08/15 films ends with Germany occupied by a gang of American soldiers portrayed as bubble-gum chewing, slack-jawed morons and uncultured louts, totally inferior in every respect to the heroic German soldiers shown in the 08/15 films. The only exception is the Jewish American officer, who is shown as both hyper-intelligent and very unscrupulous, which Bartov noted seems to imply that the real tragedy of World War II was the Nazis did not get a chance to exterminate all of the Jews, who have now returned with Germany's defeat to once more exploit the German people.

In The Doctor of Stalingrad (1958) dealing with German POWs in the Soviet Union, Germans are portrayed as more civilized, humane and intelligent than the Soviets, who are shown for the most part as Mongol savages who brutalized the German POWs. One of the German POWs successfully seduces the beautiful and tough Red Army Captain Alexandra Kasalniskaya (Eva Bartok) who prefers him to the sadistic camp commandant, which as Bartov comments also is meant to show that even in defeat, German men were more sexually virile and potent than their Russian counterparts. In Hunde, wollt ihr ewig leben? (Dogs, do you want to live forever?) of 1959, which deals with the Battle of Stalingrad, the focus is on celebrating the heroism of the German soldier in that battle, who are shown as valiantly holding out against overwhelming odds with no mention at all of what those soldiers were fighting for, namely National Socialist ideology or the Holocaust. This period also saw a number of films that depicted the military resistance to Hitler. In Des Teufels General (The Devil's General) of 1954, a Luftwaffe general named Harras loosely modeled after Ernst Udet, appears at first to be cynical fool, but turns out to an anti-Nazi who is secretly sabotaging the German war effort by designing faulty planes. Bartov commented that in this film, the German officer corps is shown as a group of fundamentally noble and civilized men who happened to be serving an evil regime made up of a small gang of gangsterish misfits totally unrepresentative of German society, which served to exculpate both the officer corps and by extension Germany society. Bartov wrote that no German film of the 1950s showed the deep commitment felt by many German soldiers to National Socialism, the utter ruthless way the German Army fought the war and the mindless nihilist brutality of the later Wehrmacht. Bartov wrote that German film-makers liked to show the heroic last stand of the 6th Army at Stalingrad, but none has so far showed the 6th Army's massive co-operation with the Einsatzgruppen in murdering Soviet Jews in 1941.

Even though there are countless film adaptations of Edgar Wallace novels worldwide, the crime films produced by the German company Rialto Film between 1959 and 1972 are the best-known of those, to the extent that they form their own subgenre known as Krimis (abbreviation for the German term "Kriminalfilm" (or "Kriminalroman"). Other Edgar Wallace adaptations in a similar style were made by the Germans Artur Brauner and Kurt Ulrich, and the British producer Harry Alan Towers.

The international significance of the West German film industry of the 1950s could no longer measure up to that of France, Italy, or Japan. German films were only rarely distributed internationally as they were perceived as provincial. International co-productions of the kind which were becoming common in France and Italy tended to be rejected by German producers (Schneider 1990:43). However a few German films and film-makers did achieve international recognition at this time, among them Bernhard Wicki's Oscar-nominated Die Brücke (The Bridge) (1959), and the actresses Hildegard Knef and Romy Schneider.

==== 1960–1970 cinema in crisis ====
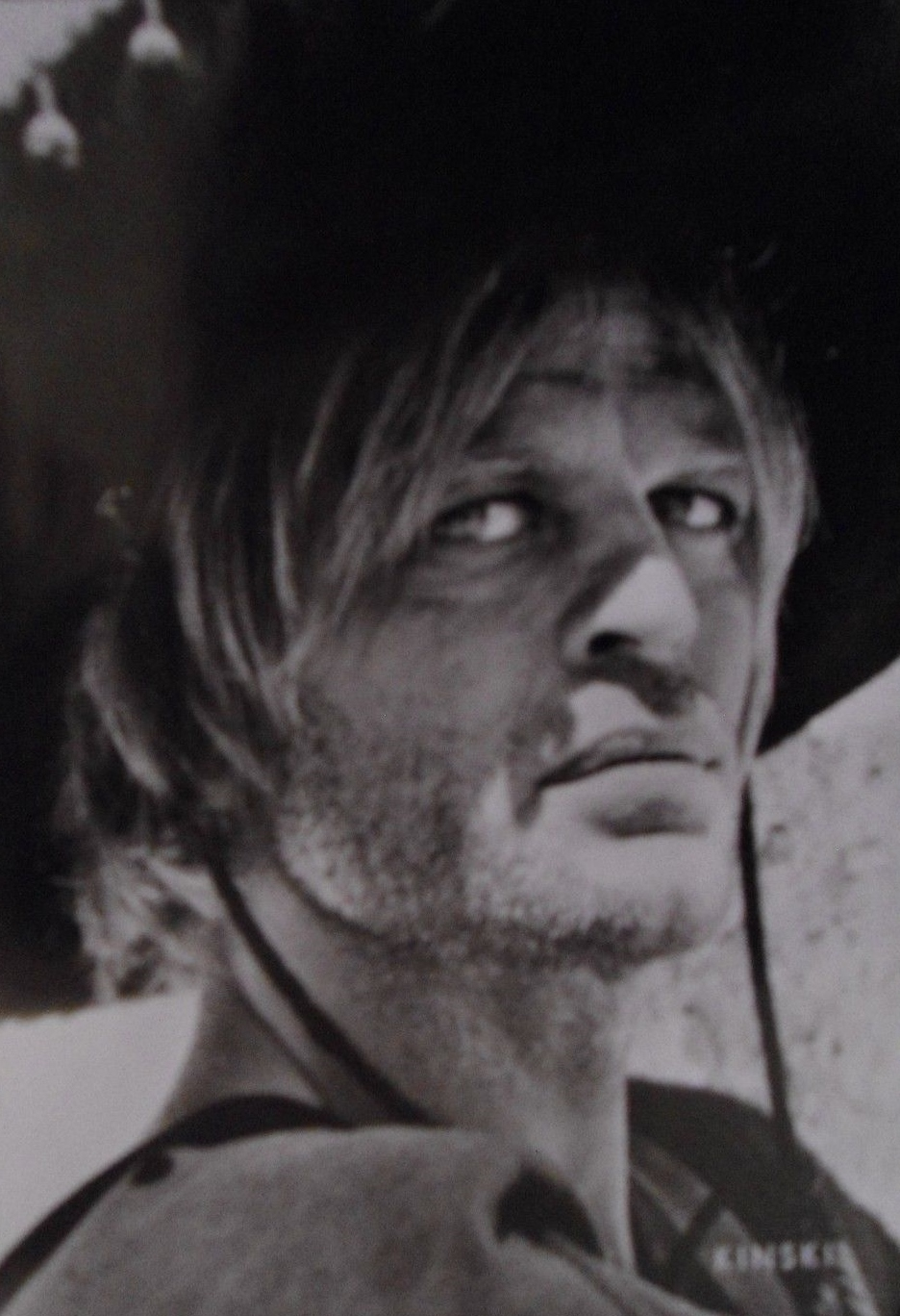
Klaus Kinski

In the late 1950s, the growth in cinema attendance of the preceding decade first stagnated and then went into freefall throughout the 1960s. By 1969 West German cinema attendance at 172.2 million visits per year was less than a quarter of its 1956 post-war peak. As a consequence of this, numerous German production and distribution companies went out of business in the 1950s and 1960s and cinemas across the Federal Republic closed their doors; the number of screens in West Germany almost halved between the beginning and the end of the decade.

Initially, the crisis was perceived as a problem of overproduction. Consequently, the German film industry cut back on production. 123 German movies were produced in 1955, only 65 in 1965. However, many German film companies followed the 1960s trends of international co-productions with Italy and Spain in such genres as spaghetti westerns and Eurospy films with films shot in those nations or in Yugoslavia that featured German actors in the casts.

The roots of the problem lay deeper in changing economic and social circumstances. Average incomes in the Federal Republic rose sharply and this opened up alternative leisure activities to compete with cinema-going. At this time too, television was developing into a mass medium that could compete with the cinema. In 1953 there were only 1,000,000 sets in West Germany; by 1962 there were 7 million (Connor 1990:49) (Hoffman 1990:69).

The majority of films produced in the Federal Republic in the 1960s were genre works: westerns, especially the series of movies adapted from Karl May's popular genre novels which starred Pierre Brice as the Apache Winnetou and Lex Barker as his white blood brother Old Shatterhand; thrillers and crime films, notably a series of Edgar Wallace movies from Rialto Film in which Klaus Kinski, Heinz Drache, Karin Dor and Joachim Fuchsberger were among the regular players. The traditional Krimi films expanded into series based on German pulp fiction heroes such as Jerry Cotton played by George Nader and Kommissar X played by Tony Kendall and Brad Harris. West Germany also made several horror films including ones starring Christopher Lee. The two genres were combined in the return of Doctor Mabuse in a series of several films of the early 1960s.

At the end of the 1960s softcore sex films, both the relatively serious Aufklärungsfilme (sex education films) of Oswalt Kolle and such exploitation films as Schulmädchen-Report (Schoolgirl Report) (1970) and its successors were produced into the 1970s. Such movies were commercially successful and often enjoyed international distribution, but won little acclaim from critics.

==== 1960–1980 New German Cinema ====
In the 1960s more than three-quarters of the regular cinema audience were lost as consequence of the rising popularity of TV sets at home. As a reaction to the artistic and economic stagnation of German cinema, a group of young film-makers issued the Oberhausen Manifesto on 28 February 1962. This call to arms, which included Alexander Kluge, Edgar Reitz, Peter Schamoni and Franz-Josef Spieker among its signatories, provocatively declared "Der alte Film ist tot. Wir glauben an den neuen" ("The old cinema is dead. We believe in the new cinema"). Other up-and-coming filmmakers allied themselves to this Oberhausen group, among them Rainer Werner Fassbinder, Volker Schlöndorff, Werner Herzog, Jean-Marie Straub, Wim Wenders, Werner Schroeter and Hans-Jürgen Syberberg in their rejection of the existing German film industry and their determination to build a new cinema founded on artistic and social measures rather than commercial success. Most of these directors organized themselves in, or partially co-operated with, the film production and distribution company Filmverlag der Autoren established in 1971, which throughout the 1970s brought forth a number of critically acclaimed films. Rosa von Praunheim, who formed the German lesbian and gay movement with his film It Is Not the Homosexual Who Is Perverse, But the Society in Which He Lives (1971), also played an important role.

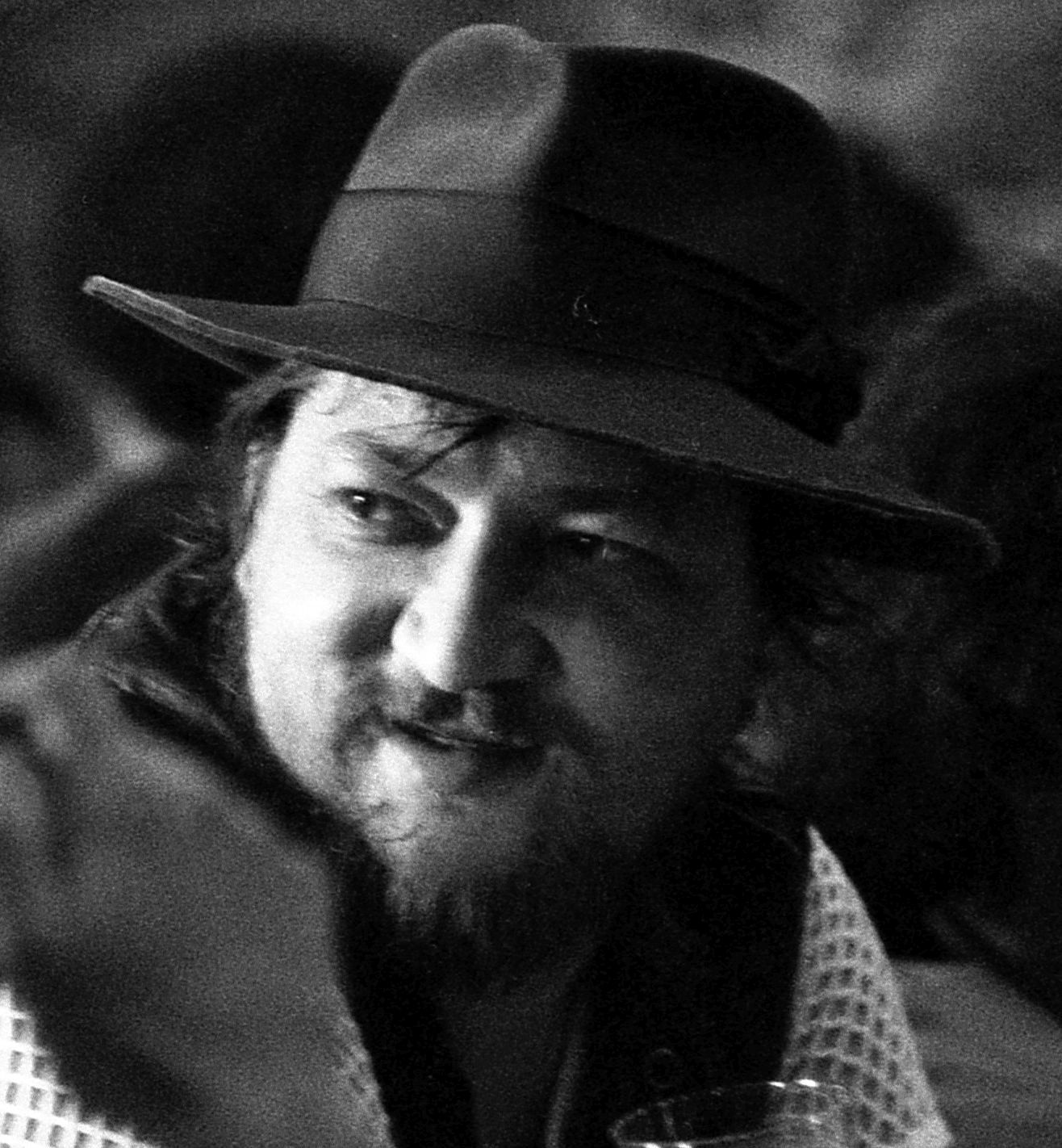
Rainer Werner Fassbinder, one of the major figures and catalysts of the New German Cinema movement

Despite the foundation of the Kuratorium Junger Deutscher Film (Young German Film Committee) in 1965, set up under the auspices of the Federal Ministry of the Interior to support new German films financially, the directors of this New German Cinema were consequently often dependent on money from television. Young filmmakers had the opportunity to test their mettle in such programmes as the stand-alone drama and documentary series Das kleine Fernsehspiel (The Little TV Play) or the television films of the crime series Tatort. However, the broadcasters sought TV premieres for the films which they had supported financially, with theatrical showings only occurring later. As a consequence, such films tended to be unsuccessful at the box office.

This situation changed after 1974 when the Film-Fernseh-Abkommen (Film and Television Accord) was agreed between the Federal Republic's main broadcasters, ARD and ZDF, and the German Federal Film Board (a government body created in 1968 to support film-making in Germany). This accord, which has been repeatedly extended up to the present day, provides for the television companies to make available an annual sum to support the production of films which are suitable for both theatrical distribution and television presentation. (The amount of money provided by the public broadcasters has varied between 4.5 and 12.94 million euros per year. Under the terms of the accord, films produced using these funds can only be screened on television 24 months after their theatrical release. They may appear on video or DVD no sooner than six months after cinema release. Nevertheless, the New German Cinema found it difficult to attract a large domestic or international audience.

The socially critical films of the New German Cinema strove to delineate themselves from what had gone before and the works of auteur film-makers such as Kluge and Fassbinder are examples of this, although Fassbinder in his use of stars from German cinema history also sought a reconciliation between the new cinema and the old. In addition, a distinction is sometimes drawn between the avantgarde "Young German Cinema" of the 1960s and the more accessible "New German Cinema" of the 1970s. For their influences the new generation of film-makers looked to Italian neorealism, the French Nouvelle Vague and the British New Wave but combined this eclectically with references to the well-established genres of Hollywood cinema. The New German Cinema dealt with contemporary German social problems in a direct way; the Nazi past, the plight of the Gastarbeiter ("guest workers"), and modern social developments, were all subjects prominent in New German Cinema films.

Films such as Kluge's Abschied von Gestern (1966), Herzog's Aguirre, the Wrath of God (1972), Fassbinder's Fear Eats the Soul (1974) and The Marriage of Maria Braun (1979), and Wenders' Paris, Texas (1984) found critical approval. Often the work of these auteurs was first recognised abroad rather than in Germany itself. The work of post-war Germany's leading novelists Heinrich Böll and Günter Grass provided source material for the adaptations The Lost Honour of Katharina Blum (1975) (by Schlöndorff and Margarethe von Trotta) and The Tin Drum (1979) (by Schlöndorff alone) respectively, the latter becoming the first German film to win the Academy Award for Best Foreign Language Film. The New German Cinema also allowed for female directors to come to the fore and for the development of a feminist cinema which encompassed the works of directors such as Margarethe von Trotta, Helma Sanders-Brahms, Jutta Brückner, Helke Sander and Cristina Perincioli.

German production companies have been quite commonly involved in expensive French and Italian productions from Spaghetti Westerns to French comic book adaptations.

==== 1980–1989 popular productions ====
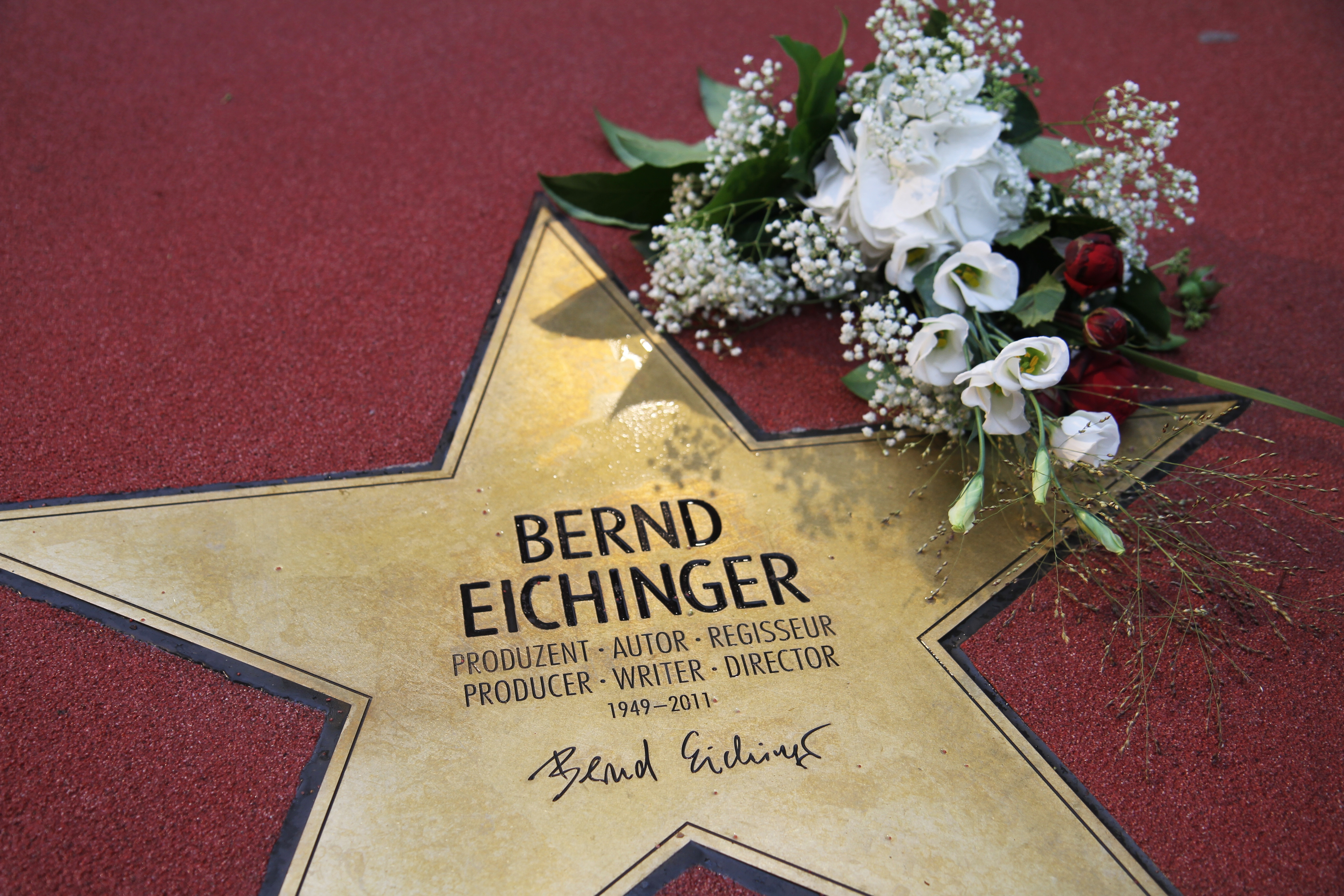
Bernd Eichinger "star" at the Boulevard of Stars in Berlin

Having achieved some of its goals, among them the establishment of state funding for the film industry and renewed international recognition for German films, the New German Cinema had begun to show signs of fatigue by the 1980s, even though many of its proponents continued to enjoy individual success.

Among the commercial successes for German films of the 1980s were the Otto film series beginning in 1985 starring comedian Otto Waalkes, Wolfgang Petersen's adaptation of The NeverEnding Story (1984), and the internationally successful Das Boot (1981), which still holds the record for most Academy Award nominations for a German film (six). Other notable film-makers who came to prominence in the 1980s include producer Bernd Eichinger and directors Doris Dörrie, Uli Edel, and Loriot.

Away from the mainstream, the splatter film director Jörg Buttgereit came to prominence in the 1980s. The development of arthouse cinemas (Programmkinos) from the 1970s onwards provided a venue for the works of less mainstream film-makers like Herbert Achternbusch, Hark Bohm, Dominik Graf, Oliver Herbrich, Rosa von Praunheim or Christoph Schlingensief.

From the mid-1980s the spread of videocassette recorders and the arrival of private TV channels such as RTL Television provided new competition for theatrical film distribution. Cinema attendance, having rallied slightly in the late 1970s after an all-time low of 115.1 million visits in 1976, dropped sharply again from the mid-1980s to end at just 101.6 million visits in 1989. However, the availability of a back catalogue of films on video also allowed for a different relationship between the viewer and an individual film, while private TV channels brought new money into the film industry and provided a launch pad from which new talent could later move into film.

=== 1990–Modern Germany ===
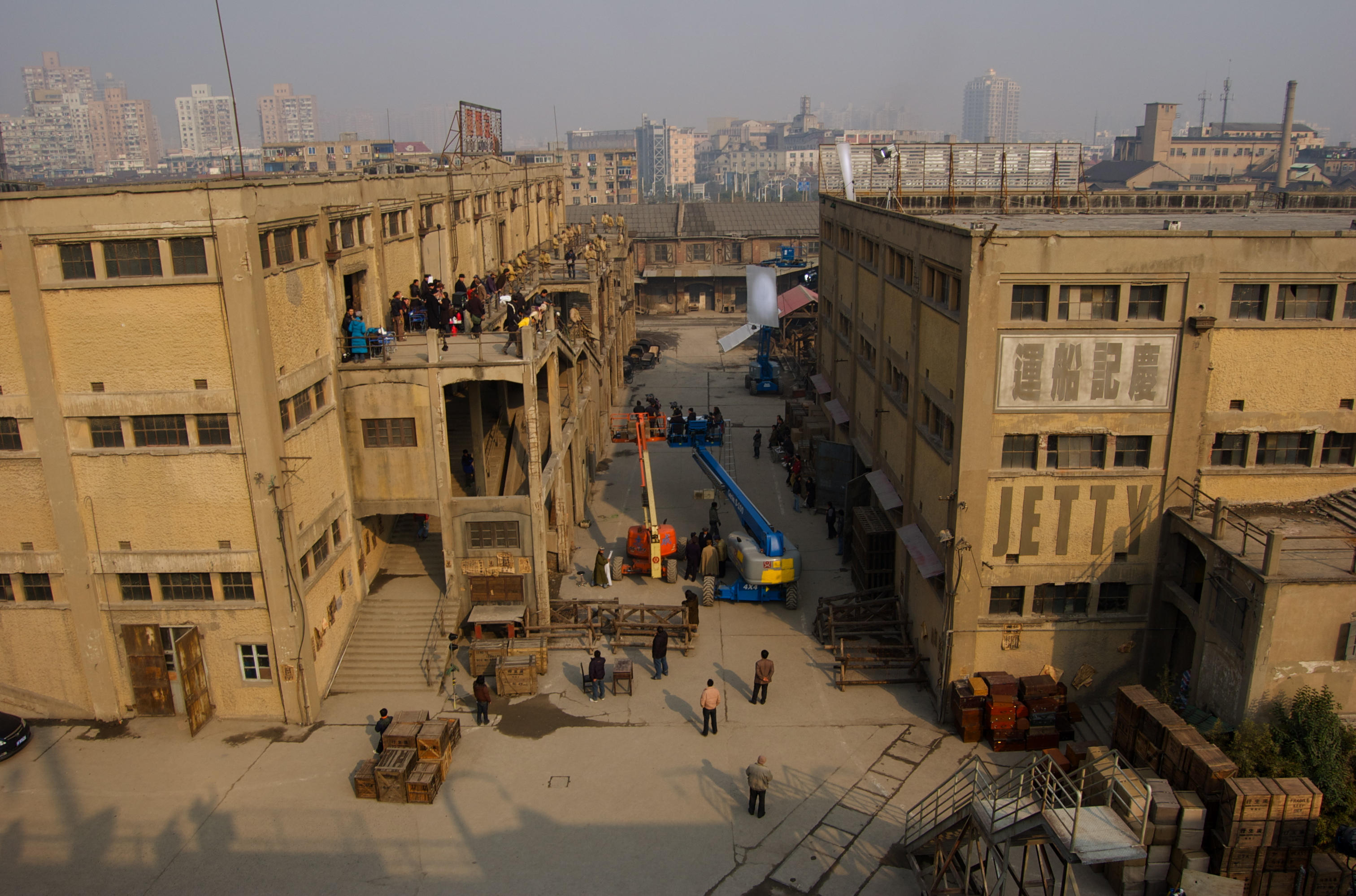
John Rabe (2009), directed by Florian Gallenberger, filming on location in Shanghai harbour

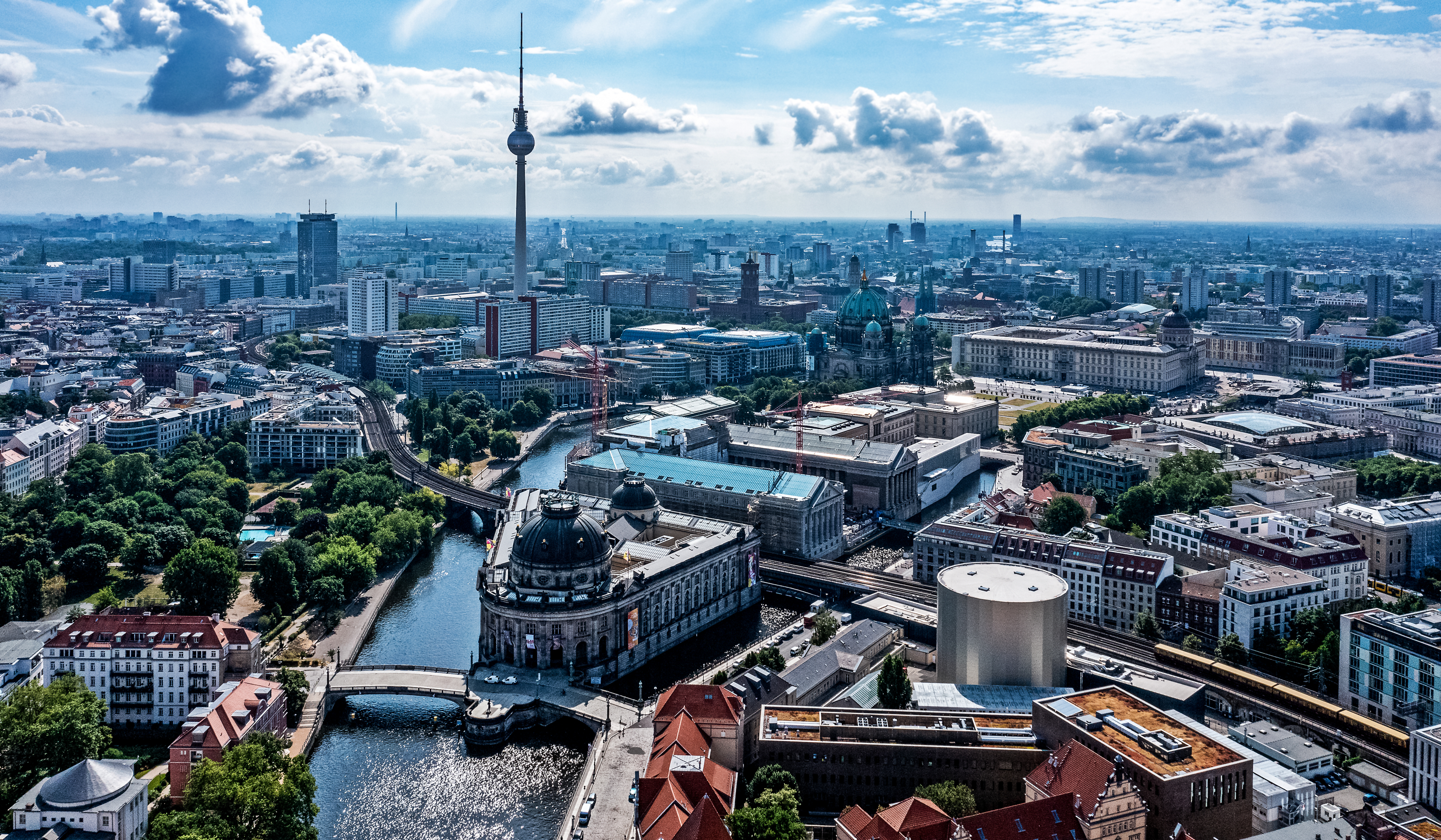
Berlin returned to being the capital of the German film industry since the German reunification in 1990.

Today's biggest German production studios include Babelsberg Studio, Bavaria Film, Constantin Film and UFA. Film releases such as Run Lola Run by Tom Tykwer, Good Bye Lenin! by Wolfgang Becker, Head-On by Fatih Akin, Perfume by Tom Tykwer and The Lives of Others by Florian Henckel von Donnersmarck, have arguably managed to recapture a provocative and innovative nature. Movies like The Baader Meinhof Complex produced by Bernd Eichinger achieved some popular success.

Notable directors working in German currently include Sönke Wortmann, Caroline Link (winner of an Academy Award), Romuald Karmakar, Dani Levy, Hans-Christian Schmid, Andreas Dresen, Dennis Gansel and Uli Edel as well as comedy directors Michael Herbig and Til Schweiger.

Internationally, German filmmakers such as Roland Emmerich or Wolfgang Petersen or Uwe Boll built successful careers as directors and producers. Hans Zimmer, a film composer, has become one of the world's most acclaimed producers of movie scores. Michael Ballhaus became a renowned cinematographer.

Germany has a long tradition of cooperation with the European-based film industry, which started as early as during the 1960s. Since 1990 the number of international projects financed and co-produced by German filmmakers has expanded.

The new millennium since 2000 has seen a general resurgence of the German film industry, with a higher output and improved returns at the German box office.

The collapse of the GDR had a large effect on the German cinema industry. The viewer count increased with the new population's access to western movies. The movies produced in the United States were the most popular, due to the fact that the market was dominated by them and the production was more advanced than Germany's. Some other genres that were popular consisted of Romantic Comedies, and Social Commentaries. Wolfgang Petersen and Roland Emmerich both established international success.

Internationally, German productions are benefitting from streaming. Their global market share is rising. Domestically, the German movies improved their market share of about 16% in 1996 to around 30% in 2021., so the movie culture is partly recognized to be underfunded, problem laden and rather inward looking.

In 2026, the German Directors Guild conducted a survey painting a bleak picture for Germany's directing community, put in the context of an overarching crisis affecting audiovisual production.

== Film financing ==
The main production incentive provided by governmental authorities is the Deutscher Filmförderfonds (DFFF) (German Federal Film Fund). The DFFF is a grant given by the Staatsministerin für Kultur und Medien (Federal Government Commissioner for Culture and the Media). To receive the grant a producer has to fulfill different requirements including a cultural eligibility test. The fund offers 50 million euros a year to film producers and or co-producers and grants can amount to up to 20% of the approved German production costs. At least 25% the production costs must be spent in Germany, or only 20%, if the production costs are higher than 20 million euros. The DFFF has been established in 2007 and supported projects in all categories and genres.

In 2015, the Deutsche Filmförderungsfond was reduced from 60 million euros to 50 million euros. To compensate, Finance minister Gabriel announced that the difference will be made up from the budget of the Bundesministerium für Wirtschaft und Klimaschutz (Federal Ministry for Economic Affairs and Climate Action). For the first time in Germany high-profile tv series and digital filmmaking will be funded at a federal level in the same manner as feature films. Funding is also increasingly flowing to international co-productions.

In 1979, the German states also began to establish funding institutions, often with the intention of supporting their own production locations. Today, film funding by the federal states makes up the largest share of film funding in Germany. A total of more than 200 million euros in grants are distributed annually, with an upward trend.

The history of film funding began in Germany with the founding of the UFA GmbH (1917), which was to produce pro-German propaganda films - equipped with funds from industry and banks. During the period of National Socialism (1933–1945), the state indirectly promoted the financing of film projects by establishing the Filmkreditbank GmbH (FKB) (Film Credit Bank).

After the end of World War II, many feature films were initially supported by federal guarantees. However, film funding in its current form did not develop until the 1950s, when television began to supplant motion pictures. In 1967, a film funding law was passed for the first time. The Berlin-based Filmförderungsanstalt (FFA) (Film Funding Agency) was the first major funding institution to be founded in 1968.

Critics accuse film funding in Germany of being institutionally fragmented, making it virtually impossible to coordinate all measures, which would ultimately benefit the quality of productions. They also say that a blanket distribution of grants stifles the incentive to produce films that recoup their production costs.

=== Film funding institutions ===
Film funding in Germany is provided, among others, by the following institutions:

==== Federal ====
- Deutscher Filmförderfonds (DFFF) (German Federal Film Fund) of the Beauftragten der Bundesregierung für Kultur und Medien (Federal Government Commissioner for Culture and the Media)
- Filmförderungsanstalt (FFA) (Film Funding Agency), since 1968
- Kuratorium junger deutscher Film (Board of Trustees for Young German Film)

==== Regional ====
- MFG Medien- und Filmgesellschaft Baden-Württemberg, since 1995
- FilmFernsehFonds Bayern, seit 1996
- Medienboard Berlin-Brandenburg, since 1994
- Filmbüro Bremen
- MOIN Filmförderung Hamburg Schleswig-Holstein
- Filmbüro Hessen
- Hessische Filmförderung
- Film- und Medienbüro Niedersachsen
- Nordmedia – Film- und Mediengesellschaft Niedersachsen/Bremen mbH
- Film- und Medienstiftung NRW
- Filmbüro Nordrhein-Westfalen
- Mitteldeutsche Medienförderung, since 1998
- MV Filmförderung, since 2020
- Filmbüro Mecklenburg-Vorpommern, until 2020
- Stiftung Rheinland-Pfalz für Kultur
- Saarländisches Filmbüro, until 1998
- Gesellschaft zur Förderung des Medienstandortes Saarland
- Filmverband Sachsen
- Kulturelle Filmförderung des Landes Sachsen-Anhalt through the Kunststiftung des Landes Sachsen-Anhalt
- Filmbüro Schleswig-Holstein
- Kulturelle Filmförderung Schleswig-Holstein
- Kulturelle Filmförderung Thüringen

Lokal:

- Filmbüro Franken (City of Nürnberg)
- Förderverein Filmkultur Bonn

== Festival ==
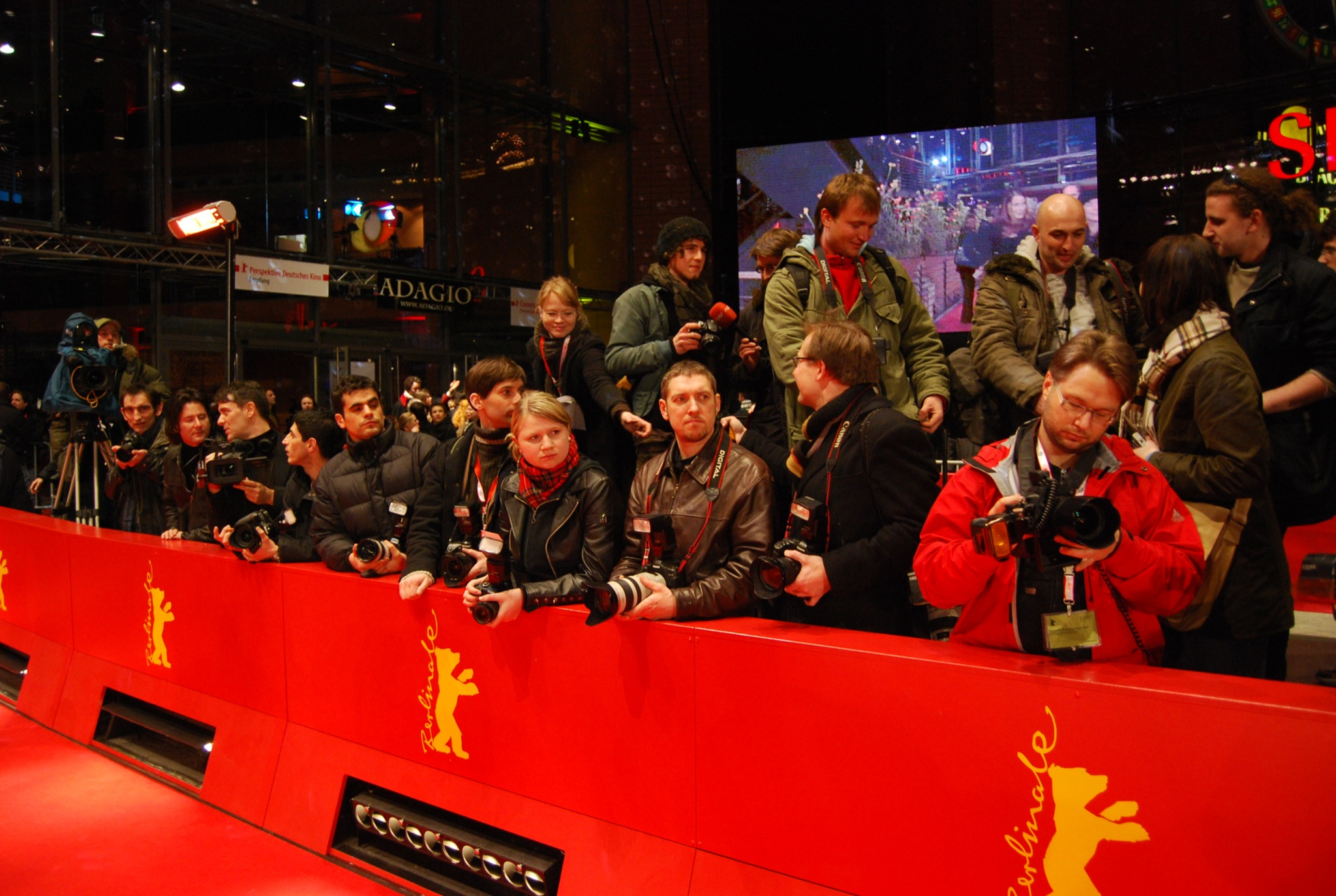
The Berlin International Film Festival, also known as Berlinale

The Berlin International Film Festival, also called Berlinale, is one of the world's leading film festivals and most reputable media events. It is held in Berlin, Germany. Founded in West Berlin in 1951, the festival has been celebrated annually in February since 1978. With 274,000 tickets sold and 487,000 admissions it is considered the largest publicly attended film festival worldwide. Up to 400 films are shown in several sections, representing a comprehensive array of the cinematic world. Around twenty films compete for the awards called the Golden and Silver Bears. Since 2001 the director of the festival has been Dieter Kosslick.

The festival, the EFM and other satellite events are attended by around 20,000 professionals from over 130 countries. More than 4200 journalists are responsible for the media exposure in over 110 countries. At high-profile feature film premieres, movie stars and celebrities are present at the red carpet.

== German Film Academy ==
The Deutsche Filmakademie was founded in 2003 in Berlin and aims to provide native filmmakers a forum for discussion and a way to promote the reputation of German cinema through publications, presentations, discussions and regular promotion of the subject in the schools.

=== Awards ===
Since 2005, the winners of the Deutscher Filmpreis, also known as the Lolas are elected by the members of the Deutsche Filmakademie. With a cash prize of three million euros it is the most highly endowed German cultural award.

Year	English title	Original title	Director(s)
2005	Go for Zucker	Alles auf Zucker!	Dani Levy
2006	The Lives of Others	Das Leben der Anderen	Florian Henckel von Donnersmarck
2007	Four Minutes	Vier Minuten	Chris Kraus
2008	The Edge of Heaven	Auf der anderen Seite	Fatih Akın
2009	John Rabe	John Rabe	Florian Gallenberger
2010	The White Ribbon	Das weiße Band	Michael Haneke
2011	Vincent Wants to Sea	Vincent will Meer	Ralf Huettner
2012	Stopped on Track	Halt auf freier Strecke	Andreas Dresen
2013	A Coffee in Berlin	Oh Boy	Jan-Ole Gerster
2014	Home from Home	Die andere Heimat	Edgar Reitz
2015	Victoria	Victoria	Sebastian Schipper
2016	The People vs. Fritz Bauer	Der Staat gegen Fritz Bauer	Lars Kraume

== Film schools ==
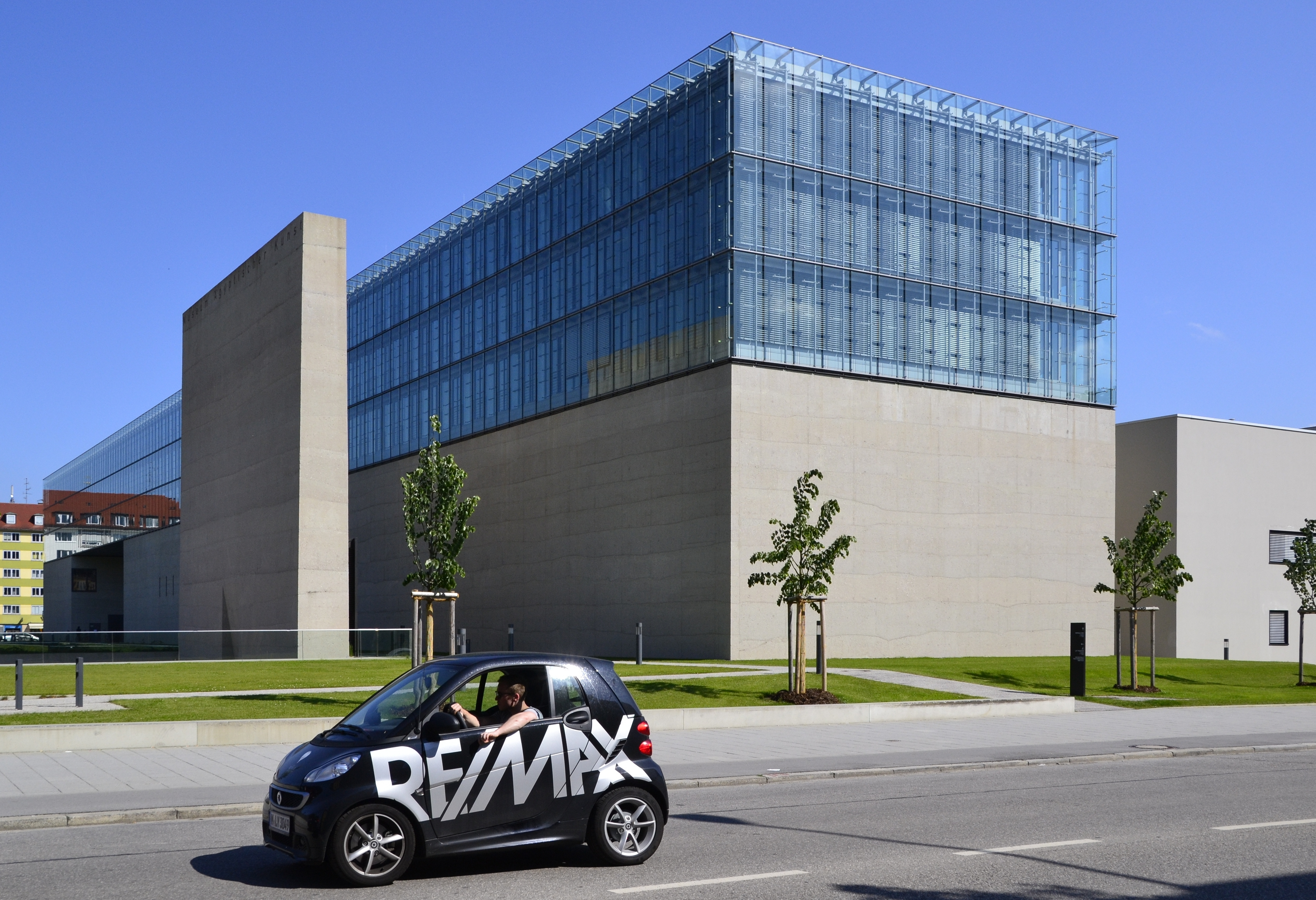
University of Television and Film Munich

Several institutions, both government run and private, provide formal education in various aspects of filmmaking.

- Deutsche Film- und Fernsehakademie Berlin (dffb) Berlin
- Hochschule für bildende Künste Hamburg (HfbK) Hamburg
- Film Academy Baden-Württemberg, Ludwigsburg
- International Film School Cologne, Cologne
- University of Television and Film Munich, Munich
- Filmuniversität Babelsberg, Potsdam

== Personalities ==
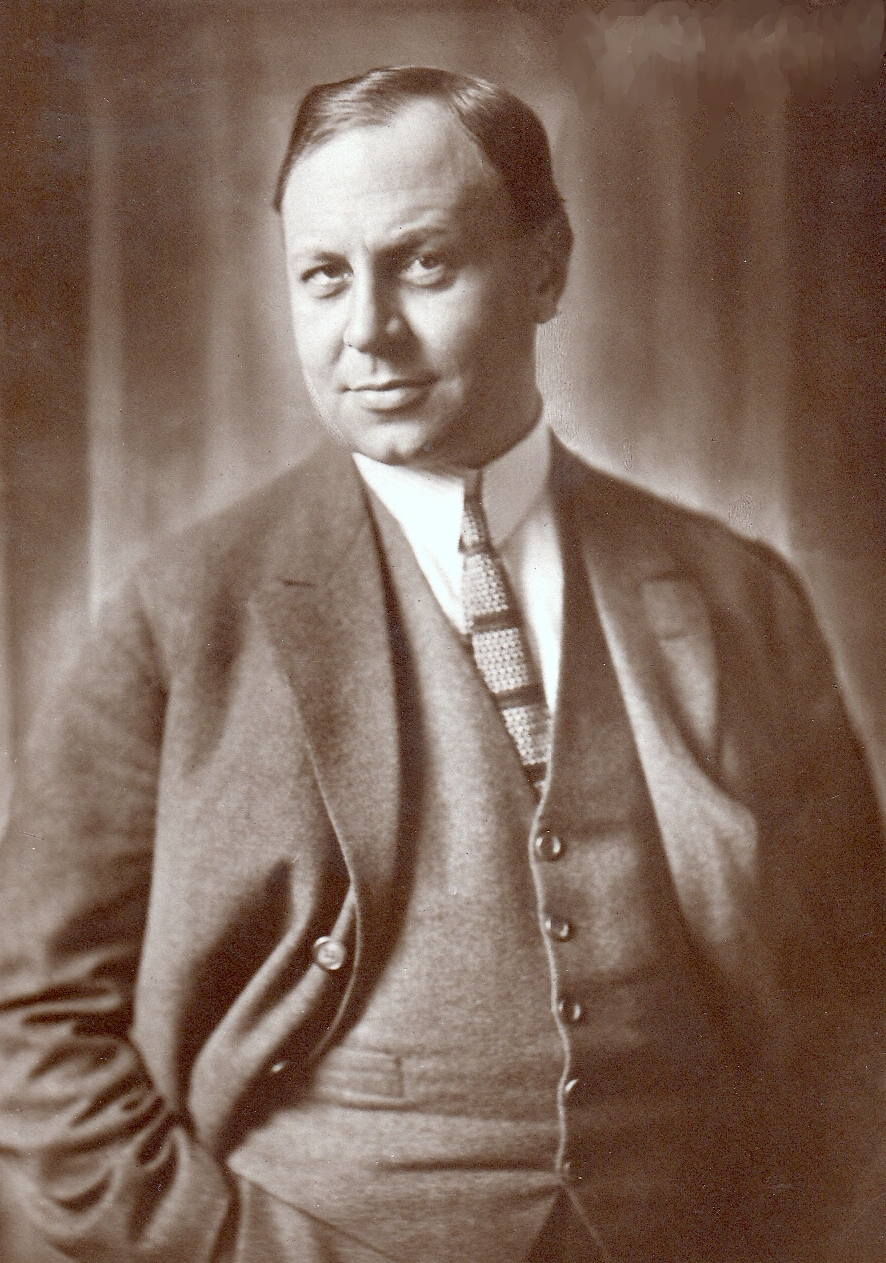
Emil Jannings

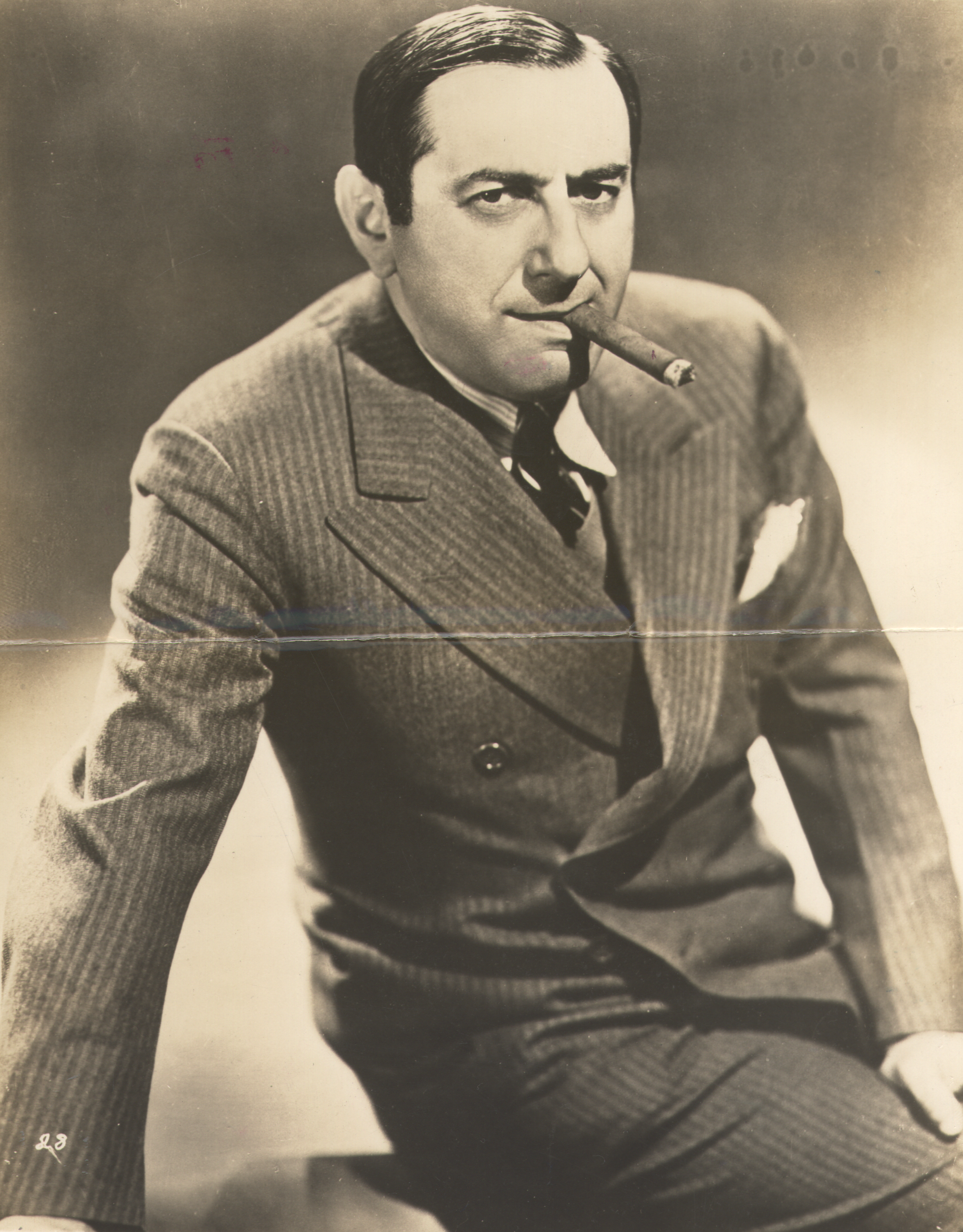
Ernst Lubitsch

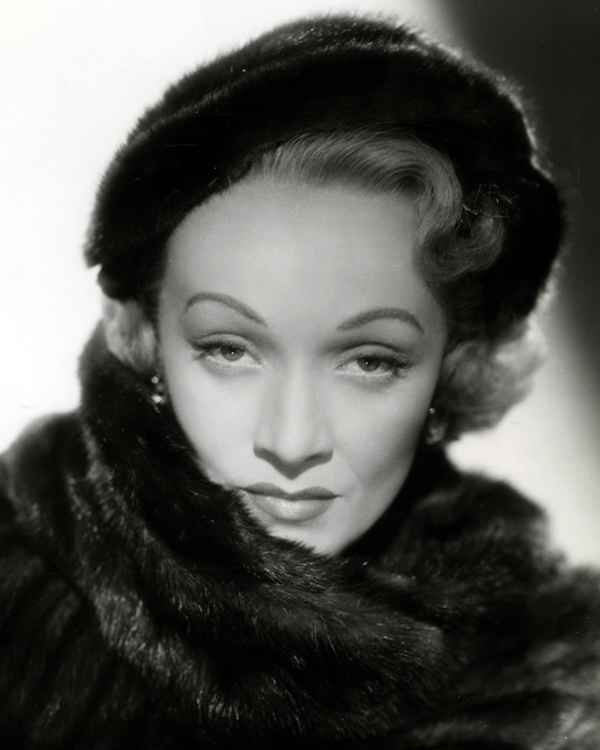
Marlene Dietrich

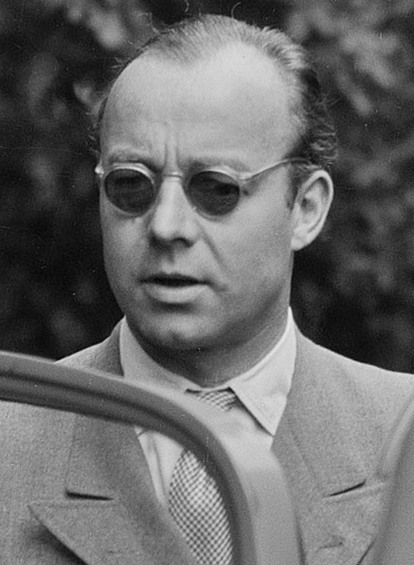
Heinz Rühmann

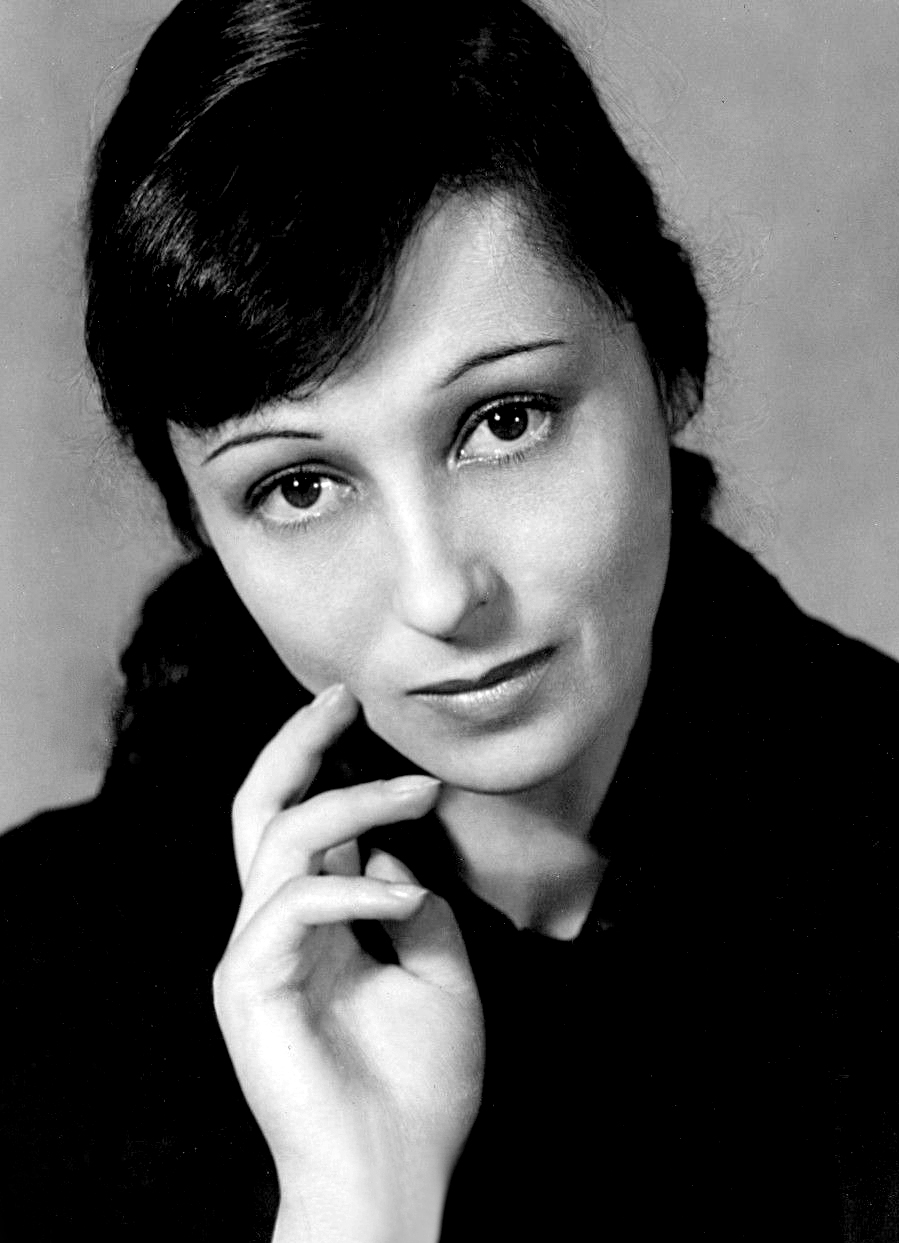
Luise Rainer

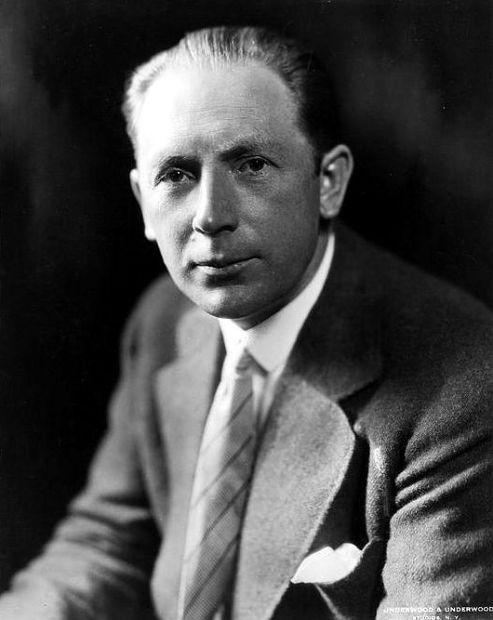
F. W. Murnau

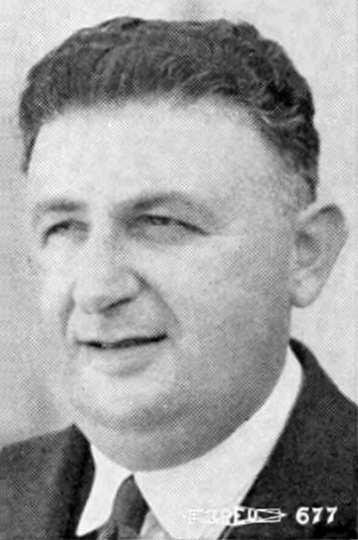
Karl Freund

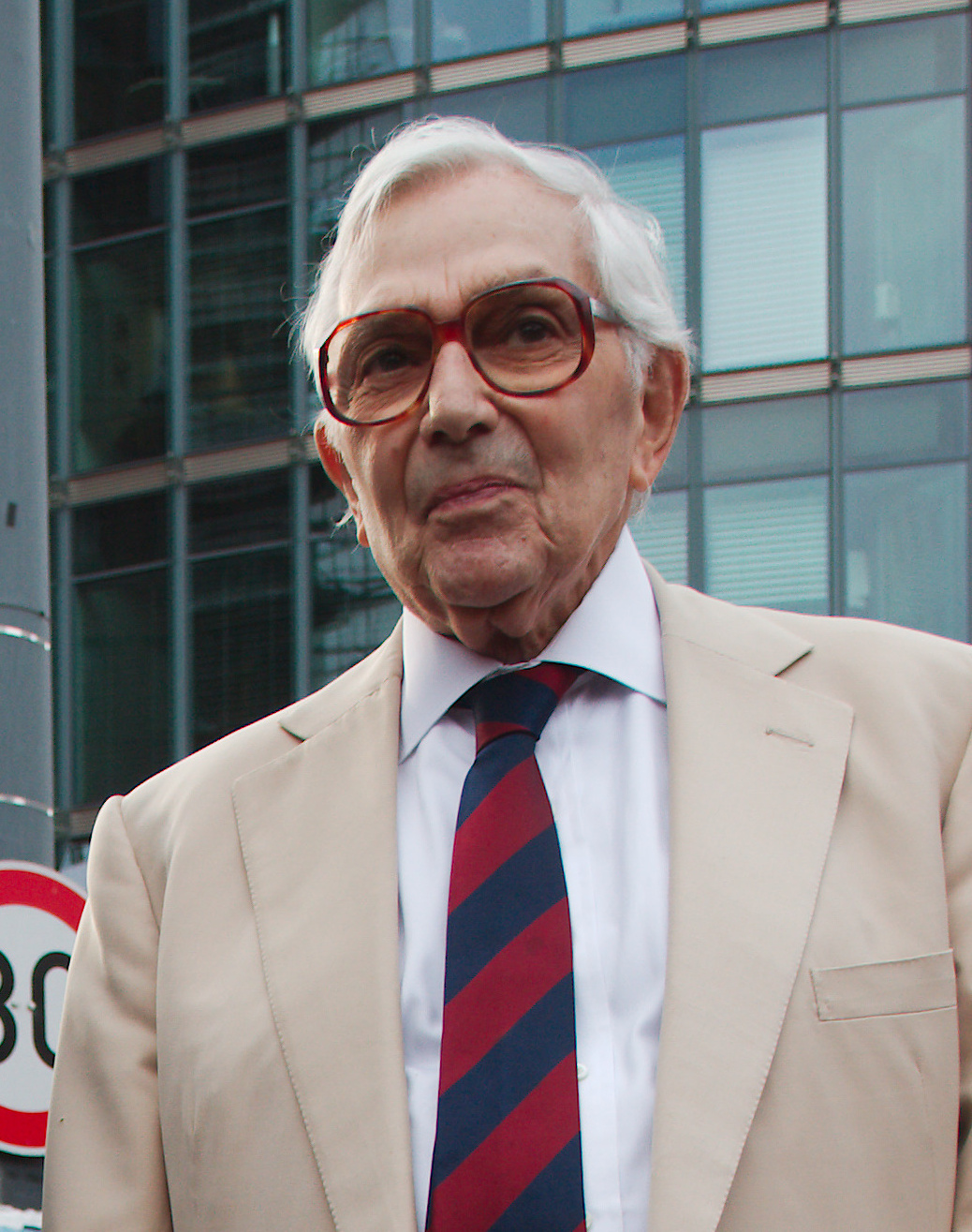
Ken Adam

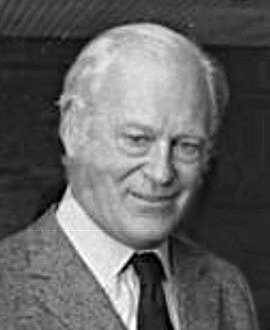
Curd Jürgens

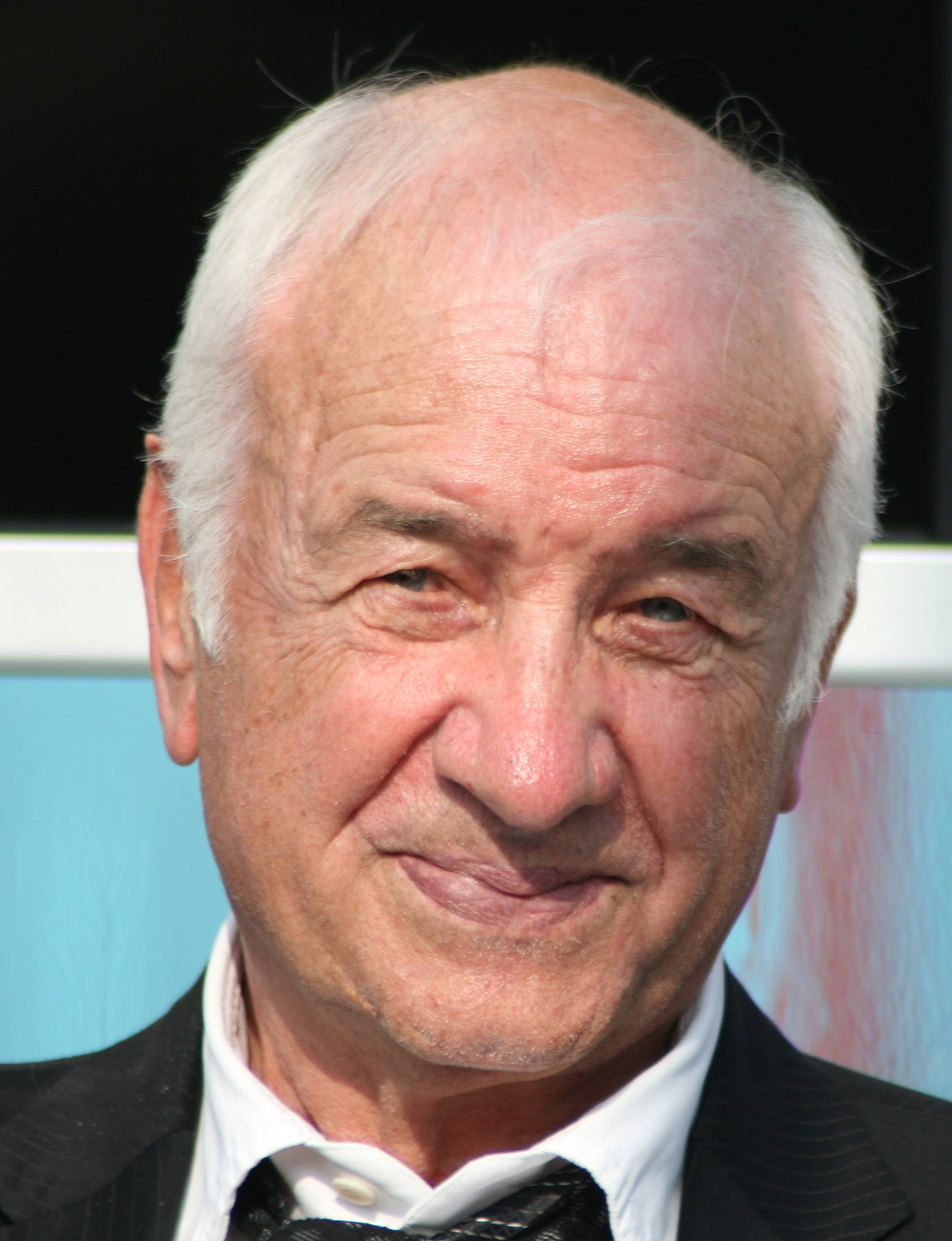
Armin Mueller-Stahl

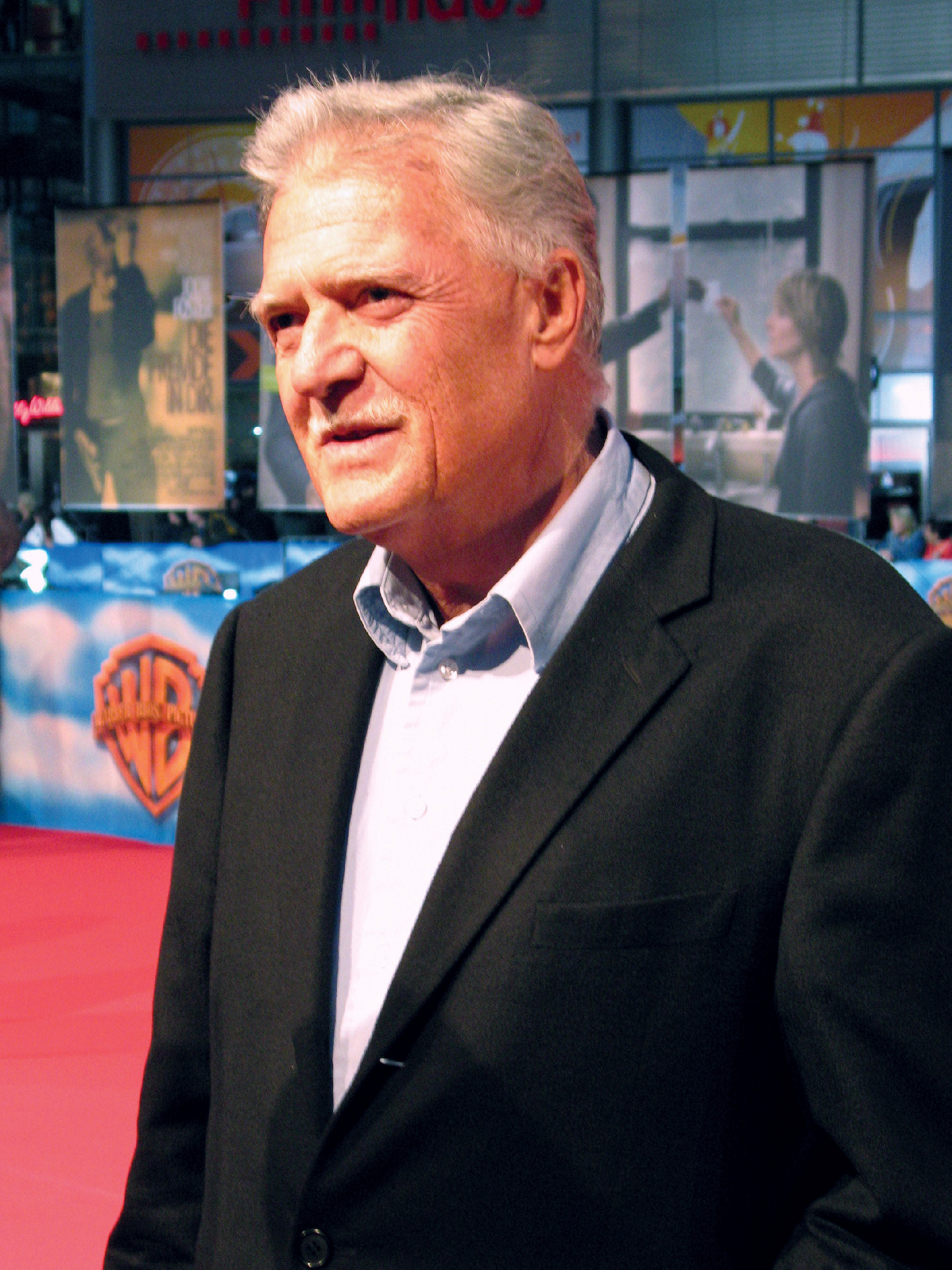
Michael Ballhaus

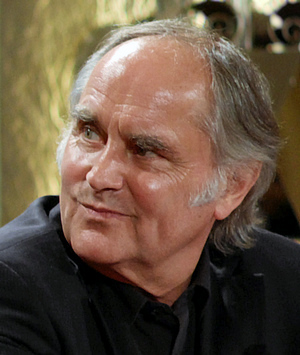
Michael Verhoeven

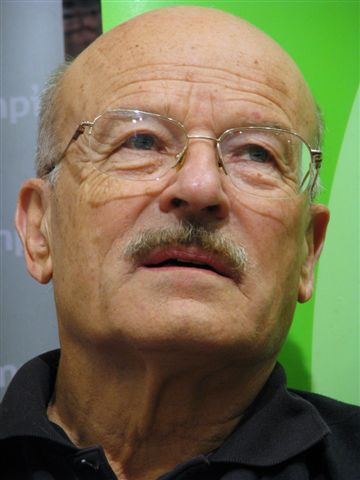
Volker Schloendorff

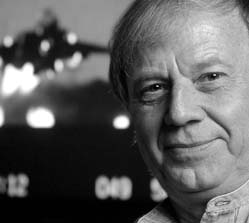
Wolfgang Petersen

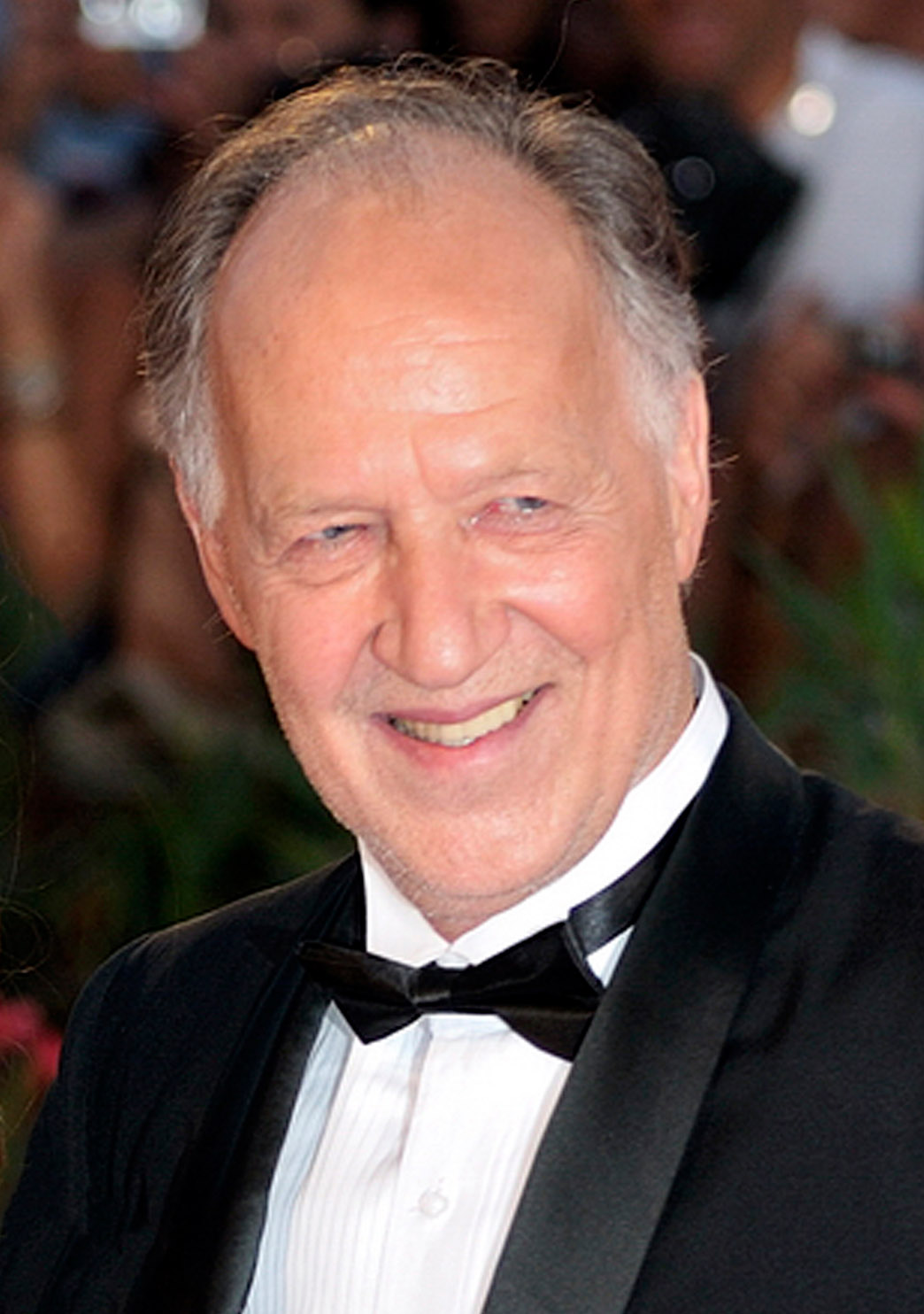
Werner Herzog

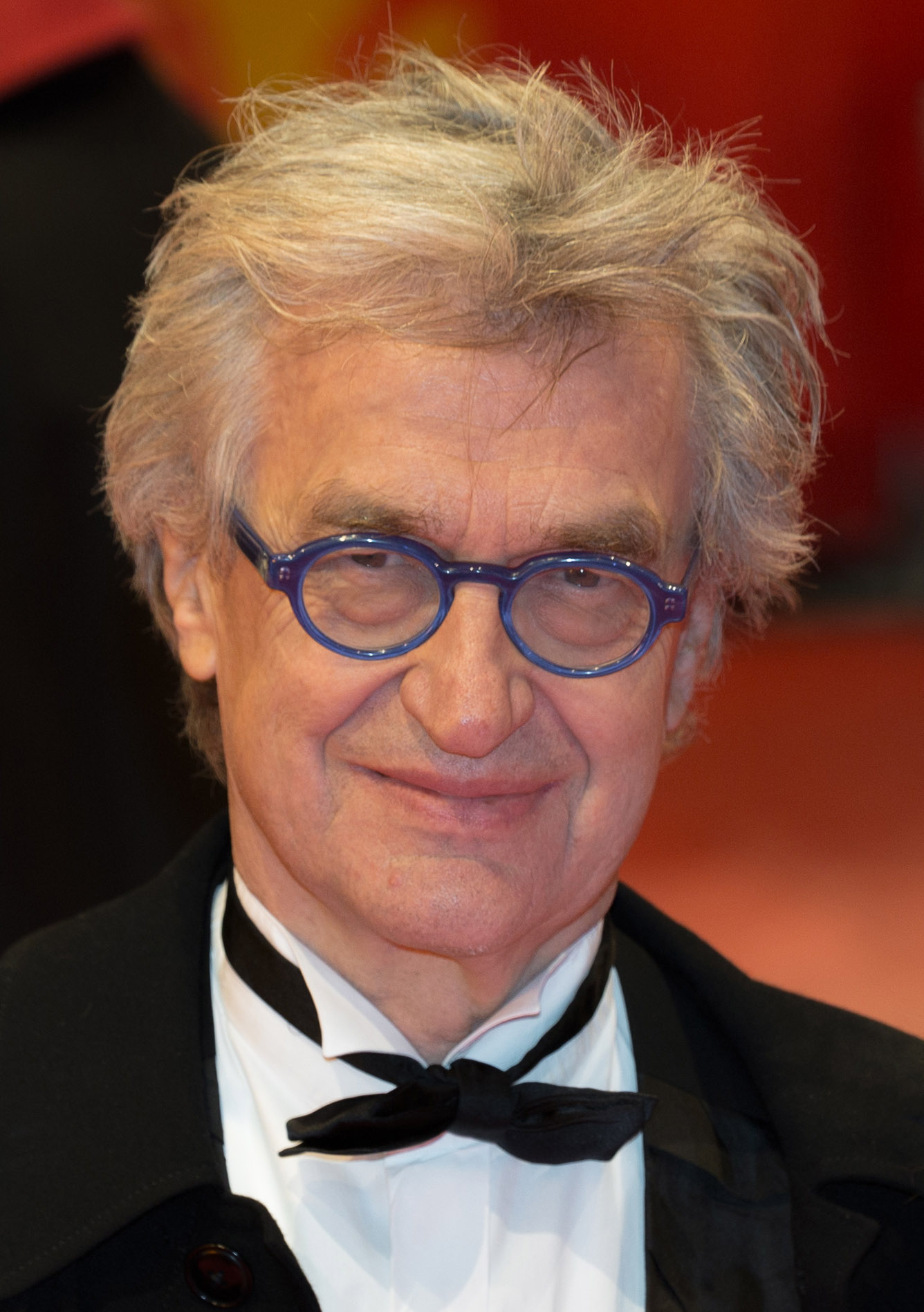
Wim Wenders

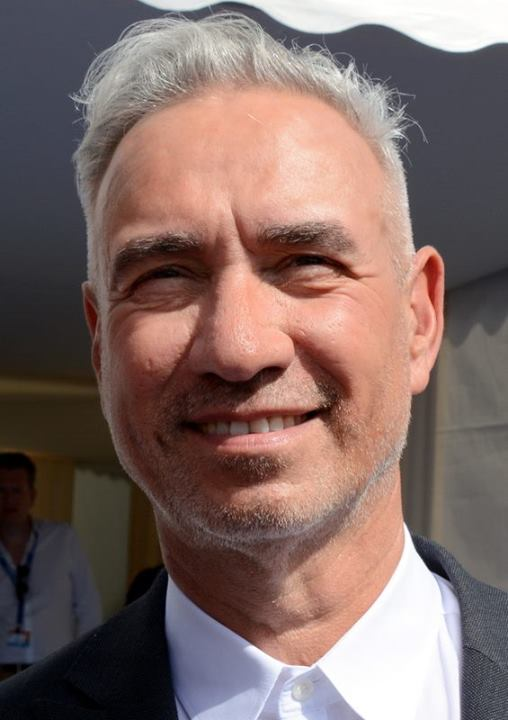
Roland Emmerich

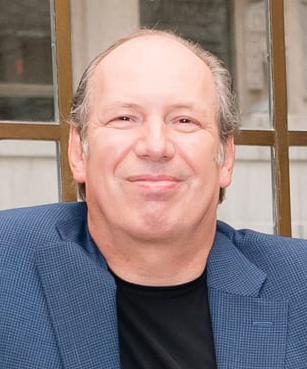
Hans Zimmer

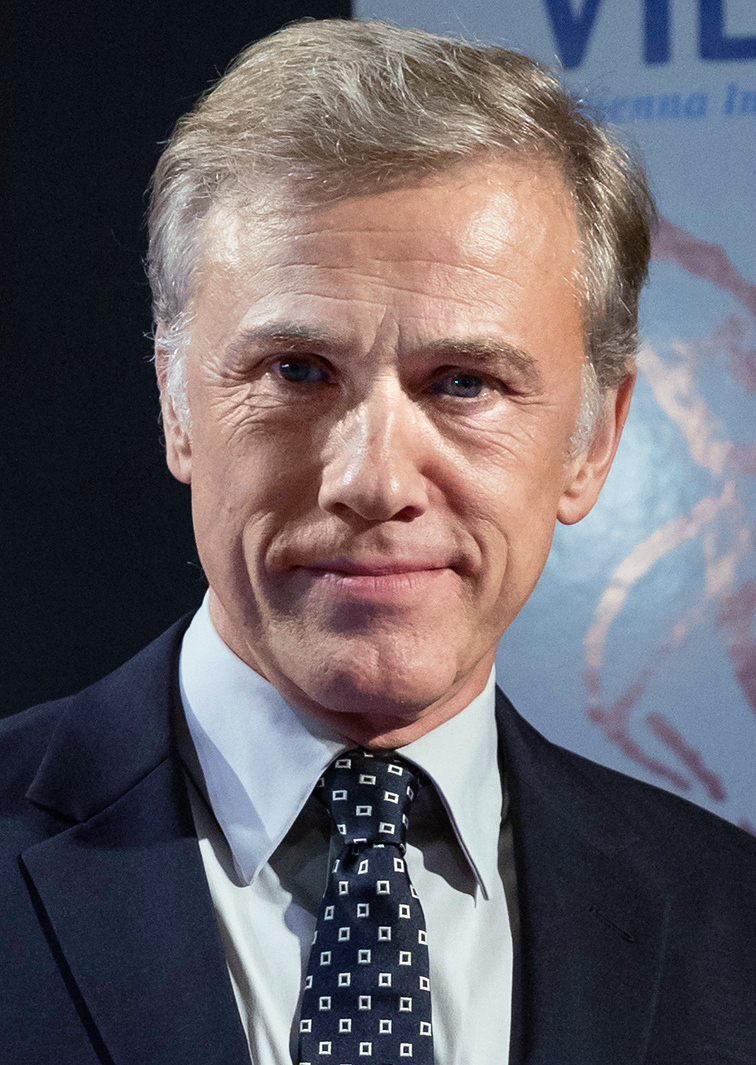
Christoph Waltz

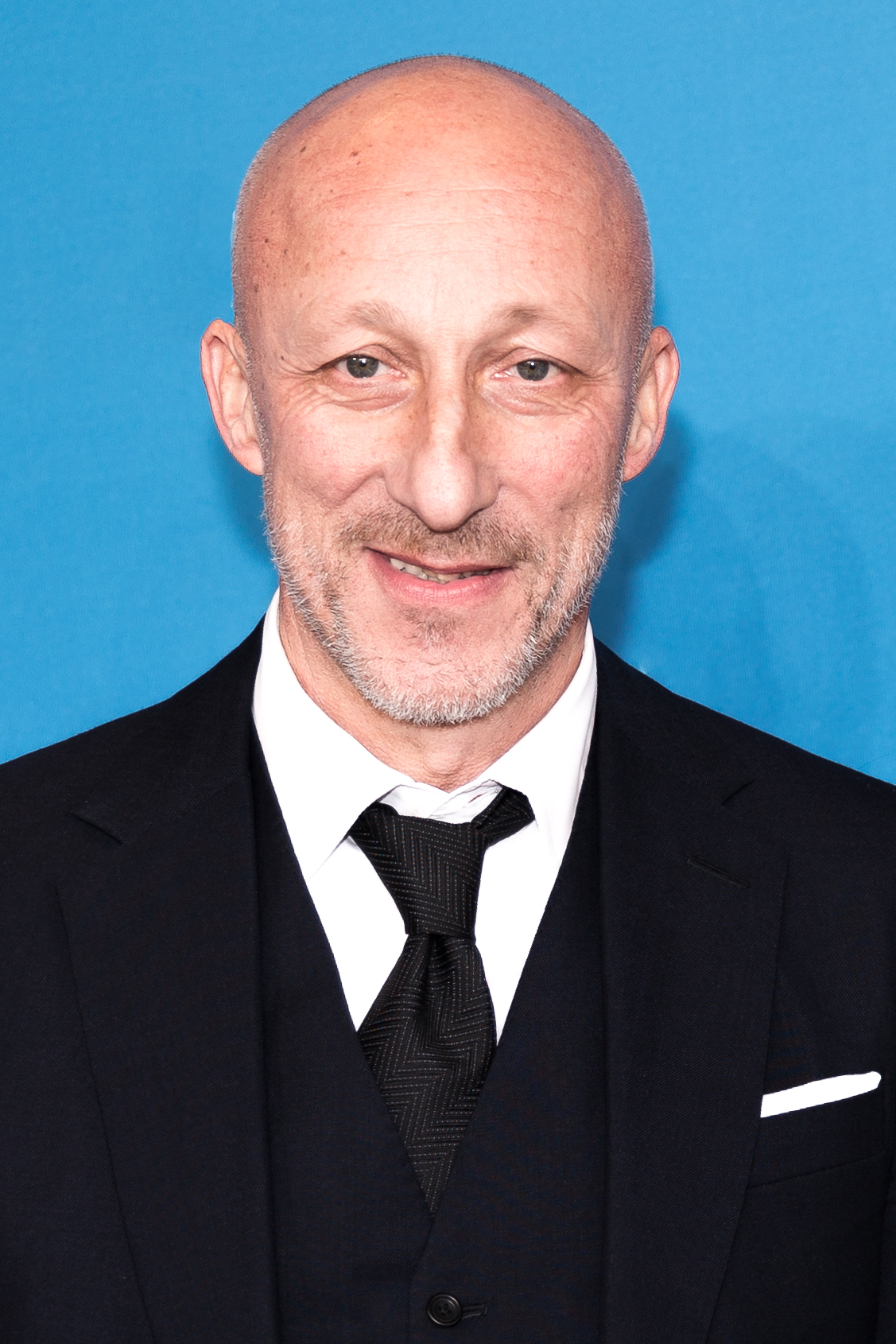
Oliver Hirschbiegel

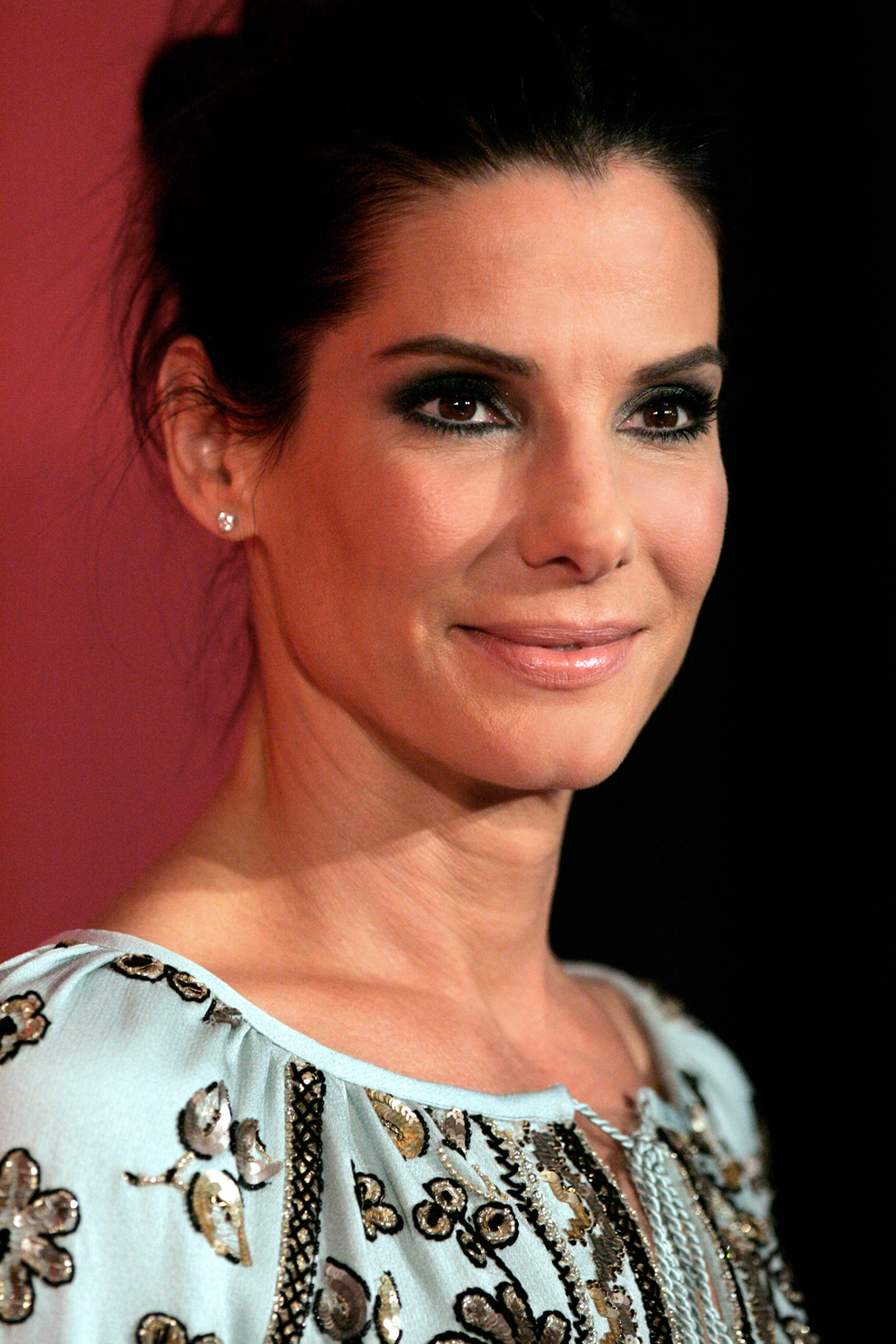
Sandra Bullock

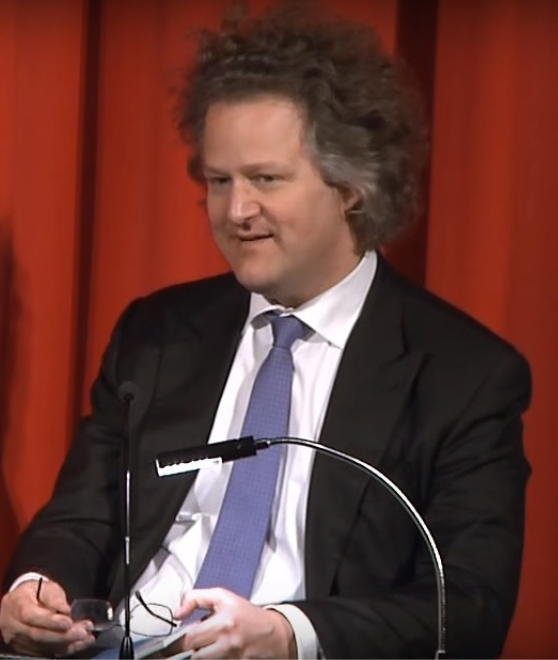
Florian Henckel von Donnersmarck

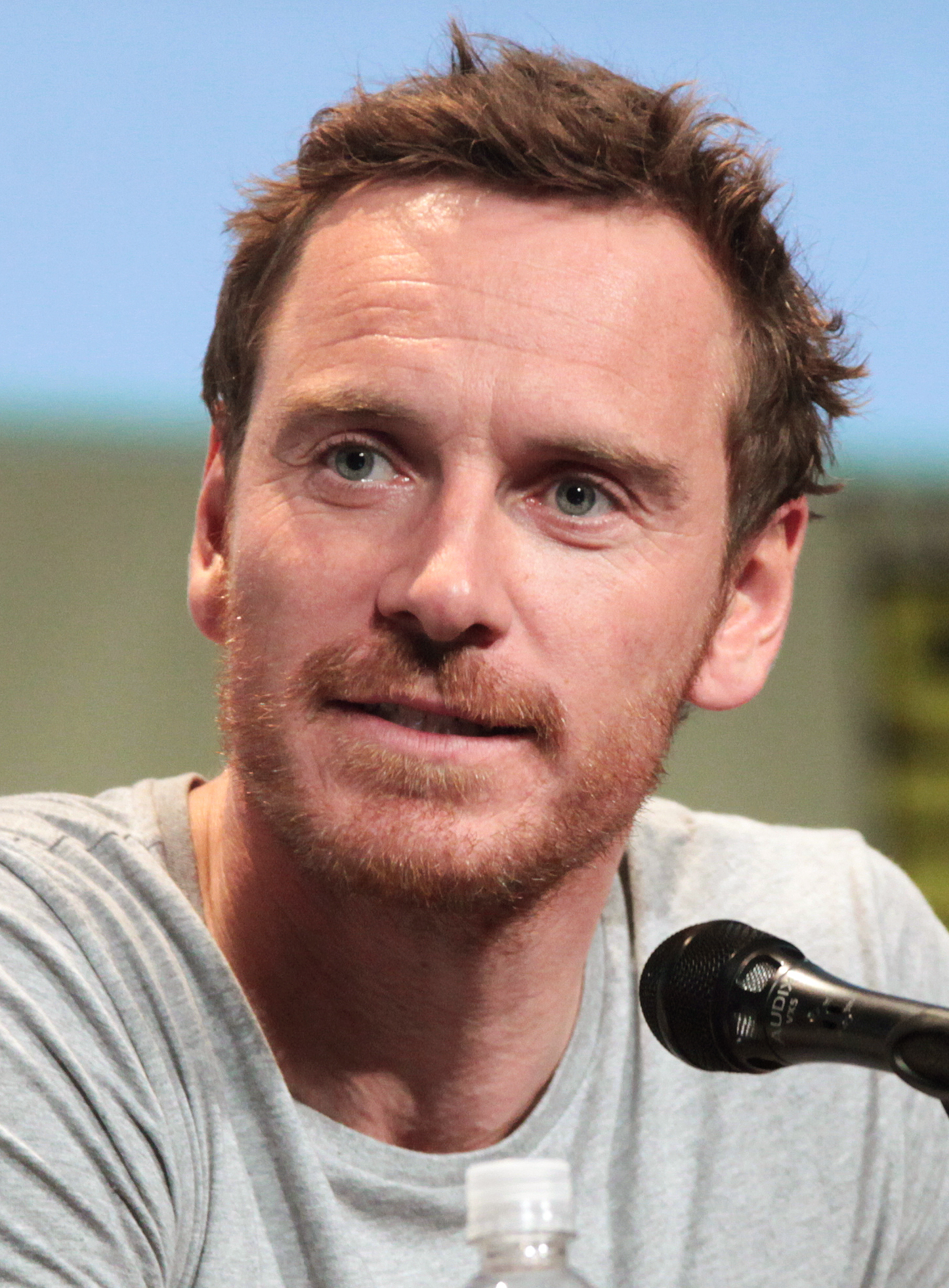
Michael Fassbender

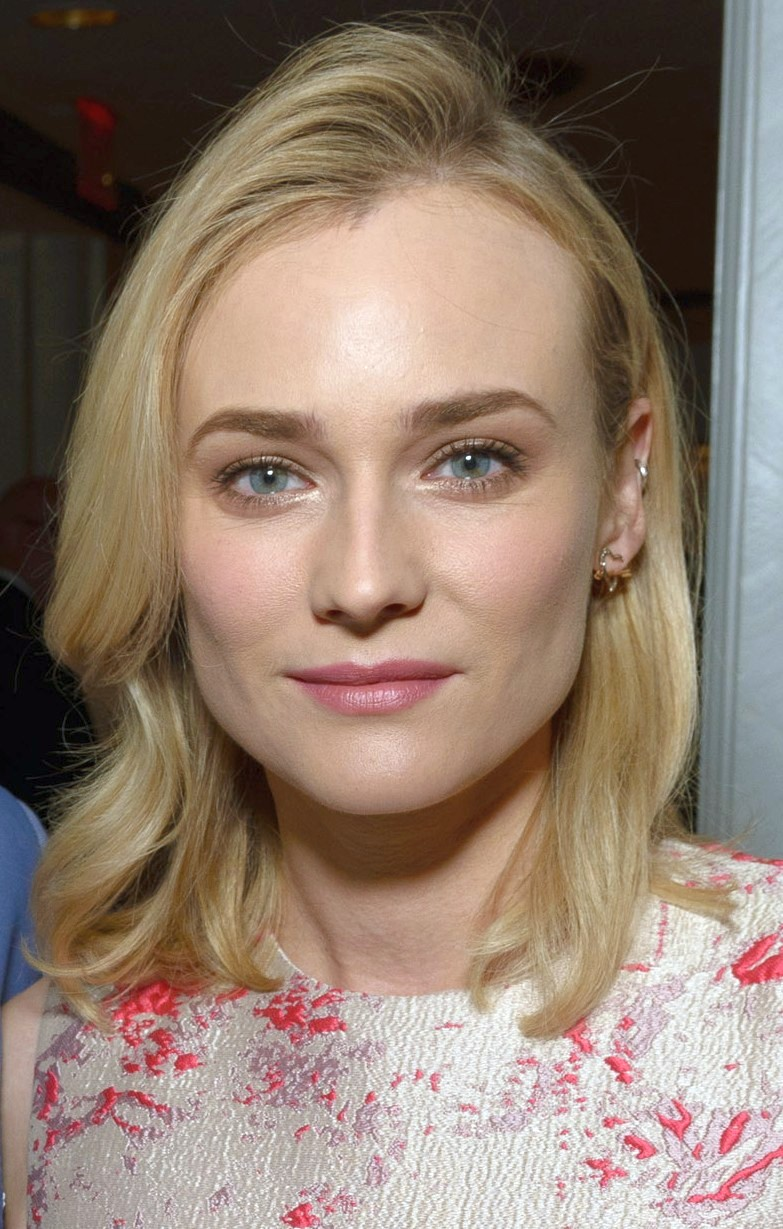
Diane Kruger

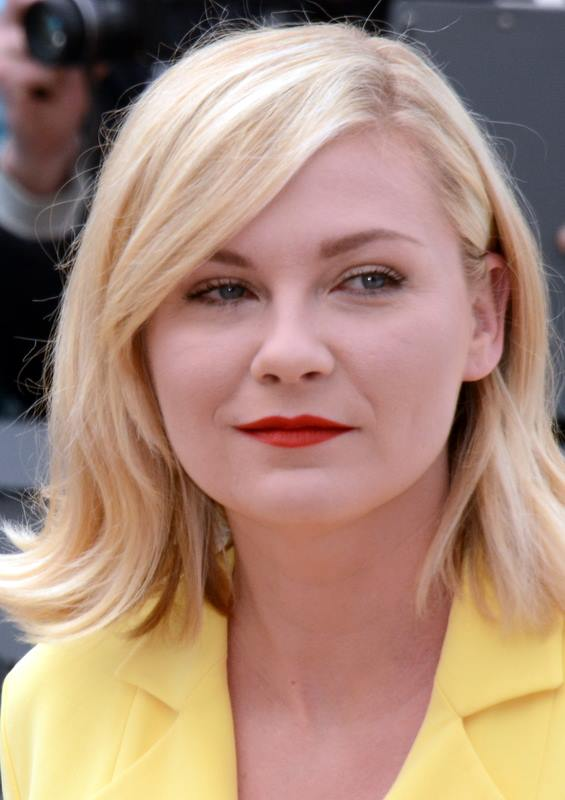
Kirsten Dunst

== See also ==
- Lists of German films
- List of German Academy Award winners and nominees
- List of highest-grossing films in Germany
- European Film Academy
- Kammerspielfilm
- German underground horror
- List of films set in Berlin
- Media of Germany
- Cinema of the world
- History of cinema
- World cinema
