= Katharina Knie =

Katharina Knie may refer to:

- Katharina Knie (play), a 1928 play by the German writer Carl Zuckmayer
- Katharina Knie (film), a 1929 German silent film adaptation directed by Karl Grune
- Katharina Knie (musical), a 1957 musical adaptation composed by Mischa Spoliansky with a libretto by Robert Gilbert
