= Scampolo (1928 film) =

1928 film directed by Augusto Genina

- Directed by: Augusto Genina
- Written by: Augusto Genina; Dario Niccodemi (play)
- Produced by: Seymour Nebenzal
- Starring: Carmen Boni; Livio Pavanelli; Hans Junkermann
- Cinematography: Victor Arménise; Axel Graatkjær
- Production company: Nero Film
- Distributed by: National Film
- Release date: 17 April 1928
- Running time: 80 minutes
- Country: Germany
- Languages: Silent; German intertitles

Scampolo is a 1928 German silent comedy film directed by Augusto Genina and starring Carmen Boni, Livio Pavanelli and Hans Junkermann. The film featured an early appearance from the future star Anna Magnani. The story of Scampolo, a fictional street child from Rome, has been made into several films.

It was made by the Berlin-based production company Nero Film. The film's sets were designed by the art directors Otto Erdmann and Hans Sohnle.

== Cast ==
- Carmen Boni as Scampolo, römisches Bettelmädchen
- Livio Pavanelli as Tito Sacchi, Ingenieur
- Hans Junkermann as Bertini, sein Freund
- Lya Christy as Lia Bertini, seine Frau
- Carla Bartheel as Franka
- Max Schreck as Ein Kellner
- Carl Goetz as Professor Giglioli
- Karl Platen as Hotelportier
- Mary Kid
- Anna Magnani

== See also ==
- Scampolo (1932)
- Scampolo (1958)

== Bibliography ==
- Teresa Viziano Fenzi & Gastone Bosio. Anna Magnani: una voce umana. Titivillus, 2008.
