= Heaven Only Knows (film) =

1947 film directed by Albert S. Rogell

- Theatrical release poster
- Directed by: Albert S. Rogell
- Screenplay by: Art Arthur; Rowland Leigh
- Adaptation by: Ernest Haycox
- Story by: Aubrey Wisberg
- Produced by: Seymour Nebenzal
- Starring: Robert Cummings; Brian Donlevy; Marjorie Reynolds
- Cinematography: Karl Struss
- Edited by: Edward Mann
- Music by: Heinz Roemheld
- Production company: Nero Films
- Distributed by: United Artists
- Release date: September 12, 1947
- Running time: 100 minutes
- Country: United States
- Language: English

Heaven Only Knows is a 1947 American Western fantasy film directed by Albert S. Rogell and starring Robert Cummings, Brian Donlevy and Marjorie Reynolds. Produced by German émigré Seymour Nebenzal's Nero Films, it was distributed by United Artists. In 1887, an angel is sent to Montana to help a man who was accidentally born without a soul to obtain his rightful spirit and fulfill his destiny as a powerful influence for good.

== Plot ==
Due to an error in Heaven, Adam "Duke" Byron, is born without a soul in 1858. The "Book of Destiny" shows that he was supposed to marry a minister's daughter in 1885 and set a fine moral example. Instead, he is a saloon keeper and gambling hall owner in Glacier, Montana. As it was the fault of his department, Michael is sent in 1887 to set Duke on the life path for which he was destined, but Michael must do so as a human being, without miracles, not even a small one.

Michael encounters Bill Plummer. Plummer and Duke are rival saloon keepers and partners in a mining company, but due to a dispute between them, the mine is closed, leaving many of the townspeople destitute. Plummer has hired the Kansas City Kid, a gunslinger, to kill Duke. When Bill finds out that Duke knows about his plan, he gives Michael a lift into town and as Plummer hopes, Duke mistakes Michael for the Kid. Duke's satanic henchman, Treason, takes a shot at Michael, narrowly missing a young girl. Furious, parson's daughter and schoolmarm Drusilla Wainwright storms into the "Copper Queen", Duke's saloon, and slaps him.

Drusilla and most of the other residents want to take the law into their own hands to take back their town, but Sheriff Matt Bodine talks them into waiting until Plummer and Duke's men kill each other first.

Michael accidentally foils the Kid's attempt to shoot Duke. When Duke learns that the dead assassin is actually the Kansas City Kid, he believes that Michael is a smart, ambitious outlaw, so he hires him. Showgirl Ginger, Duke's girlfriend, takes a great liking to Michael; Treason hates him on sight.

Plummer sets fire to Duke's saloon, trapping him inside, with Plummer's men waiting for him to come out. Duke's secret passageway is locked from the outside, but Michael opens it and rescues him. They take refuge in the school. While they wait for darkness, they start talking to Drusilla. Duke admits that he feels that he is "meant for something... something big, something important", not what he is doing now, but he does not know what it is. Before he leaves, Duke kisses Drusilla; she resists at first, but not for long.

In retaliation, Treason, who walked through the blaze unharmed, sets fire to Plummer's saloon. Speck O'Donnell, a sickly child Duke likes, is trapped inside. Michael goes in after him, but Duke follows, sends Michael out and rescues Speck.

Sheriff Bodine maneuvers Duke and Plummer into a showdown for sole ownership of the mine. Duke accepts the challenge, even though he is at a great disadvantage against skilled gunman Plummer. Duke is wounded, but Plummer is blinded by sunlight, perhaps by divine intervention. Speck runs to Duke, pursued by Judd, who is shot saving the boy. Duke manages to kill Plummer with his last shot. In a daze, he walks to the church, where Drusilla waits. Dying, Judd recognizes Michael.

With Plummer dead, vigilantes plot to lynch Duke. Drusilla persuades Duke to flee rather than shoot it out, but he insists he will only go if she comes with him. She agrees. Once they are safely away, she confesses her love but refuses to marry him. Thwarted, the mob decides to lynch Michael instead, but the horse he is on refuses to move. At the last minute, Duke rides back with Drusilla, to save Mike's life and reform. Treason vanishes. That night, Mike rides off on a special coach to Heaven, taking Speck with him. Speck's tearful mother somehow knows her child's fate.

== Cast ==
- Robert Cummings as an angel named Michael (not the Archangel)
- Brian Donlevy as Adam "Duke" Byron
- Marjorie Reynolds as Ginger, aka "The Copper Queen"
- Jorja Curtright as Drusilla Wainwright
- Bill Goodwin as Bill Plummer
- John Litel as Reverend Wainwright
- Stuart Erwin as Sheriff Matt Bodine
- Gerald Mohr as Treason
- Edgar Kennedy as Judd
- Lurene Tuttle as Mrs. O'Donnell
- Peter Miles as Speck O'Donnell
- Will Orleans as Kansas City Kid (as Will Orlean)
- Ray Bennett as Lawyer Creel
- William Farnum as Gabriel (uncredited)
- Dwayne Hickman as Heavenly Pageboy (uncredited)
- Tom London as Townsman (uncredited)

== Production ==
The producer bought the rights to the story in July 1946 and Brian Donlevy was discussed as a star from the start.

On November 26, 1946 the producer announced he had signed Cummings and Donlevy (Cummings had just made The Chase for the producer ). Filming began December 2. Helen Walker was originally to have starred; because of her devastating December 1946 auto accident, she was replaced by Marjorie Reynolds.

Censors restricted Michael's behavior and insisted that the character not be identified with the Archangel. The Archangel Gabriel does appear among the angels in Heaven, where there is a brief mention of his blowing his trumpet at the end of the world.

== Reception ==
The New York Times critic wrote that "On the whole 'Heaven Only Knows' comes through as a tolerable entertainment, with such good moral intentions that one may overlook its self-conscious awkwardness in this regard." However, "Mr. Cummings, it seemed to us, never did quite make up his mind whether to be serious or plain supercilious as the detached Archangel Michael. Brian Donlevy as the Duke also never gets any conviction into his role."

Variety called it "an amusing fantasy done in an almost straight manner to give it credence... It's a tongue-in-cheek treatment that lends a lightness to what, otherwise, could have been-rather heavy drama."

== See also ==
- List of films about angels
