= Gad Granach =

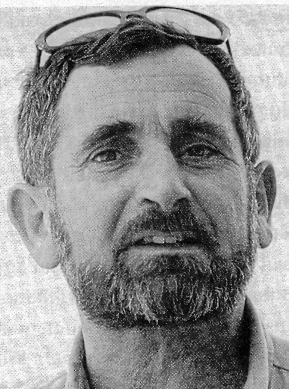
- Gad Granach
- Born: 29 March 1915; Rheinsberg, German Empire
- Died: 6 January 2011 (aged 95); Jerusalem, Israel
- Occupation: Author
- Spouse: Miki Haviv
- Parent: Alexander Granach Martha Guttmann

Gad Granach (29 March 1915 – 6 January 2011) was the son of German actor Alexander Granach known for his roles in Nosferatu, Ninotchka, and For Whom the Bell Tolls. Gad Granach fled Germany at the age of 21 during the rise of Nazism, immigrating to the then-British Mandate of Palestine in 1936. He published a memoir entitled Where is Home? Stories from the Life of a German-Jewish Émigré (originally in German: Heimat los! Aus dem Leben eines jüdischen Emigranten) recounting of his early life in Berlin and subsequent life in Israel.

== Literature ==
- Gad Granach: Where is Home? Stories from the Life of a German-Jewish Émigré, Atara Press, Los Angeles 2009, ISBN 978-0-9822251-1-0
- Gad Granach: Heimat los! Aus dem Leben eines jüdischen Emigranten, Ölbaum-Verlag, Augsburg 1997, ISBN 3-927217-31-X; Fischer Taschenbuch Verlag, Frankfurt 2000, ISBN 3-596-14649-6, Random House/Bertelsmann, Munich 2008, ISBN 978-3-442-73630-0
- Alexander Granach: Da geht ein Mensch, Ölbaum-Verlag, Augsburg 2003, ISBN 3-927217-38-7
- Alexander Granach: There Goes a Mensch: A Memoir, Atara Press, Los Angeles 2019, ISBN 9780982225158
- Alexander Granach: "From the Shtetl to the Stage: The Odyssey of a Wandering Actor" Transaction Publishers, 2010.

== Film ==
- Israel, Why (Pourquoi Israel), directed by Claude Lanzmann, France, 1973
- Granach der Jüngere, directed by Anke Apelt, Germany, 1997
- Alexander Granach - Da geht ein Mensch, directed by Angelika Wittlich, Germany, 2012

== Audio recordings ==
- Ach So! Gad Granach und Henryk Broder on Tour CD, Ölbaum-Verlag, Augsburg 2000, ISBN 3-927217-40-9
