= The Story of a Little Parisian =

1928 film directed by Augusto Genina

- Directed by: Augusto Genina
- Written by: Jane Bess; Pierre Soulaine
- Produced by: Seymour Nebenzal
- Starring: Carmen Boni
- Cinematography: Victor Arménise; Friedl Behn-Grund
- Music by: Hansheinrich Dransmann
- Production companies: Nero Film; Société des Cinéromans
- Distributed by: National Film (Germany)
- Release date: 26 January 1928
- Countries: France; Germany; Italy
- Languages: Silent; Italian intertitles

The Story of a Little Parisian (French: Totte et sa chance, German: Der Sprung ins Glück, Italian: La storia di una piccola Parigina) is a 1928 silent film directed by Augusto Genina. It was made as a co-production between France, Germany and Italy. The film was created in conjunction with Maurice Yvain's operetta Yes; a stage work which shares the same story as the film and which starred French singer and actress Arletty as Totte. Both works simultaneously premiered in Paris on January 26, 1928.

The film's art direction was by Otto Erdmann and Hans Sohnle.

== Cast ==
- Carmen Boni as Totte
- André Roanne as Renato Gavard
- Hermann Vallentin as Gavards Vater
- Carla Bartheel as Nénesse
- Lya Christy as Lucette
- Hans Junkermann as Ein alter Graf
- Magnus Stifter as Diener
- Oreste Bilancia as Loysel, Sekretär
- Max Lentlos as Julien, Friseur
- Ossip Darmatow as Lebemann
- Loni Nest as Lehrmädchen
- Anton Pointner
- Angelo Ferrari
- Rosa Valetti

== Bibliography ==
- Parish, James Robert. Film Actors Guide. Scarecrow Press, 1977.
