= White Cargo (1937 film) =

1937 film by Robert Siodmak

Cargaison blanche, or Le Chemin de Rio
- Directed by: Robert Siodmak
- Written by: Henri Jeanson; Herbert Juttke; Jean Masson
- Produced by: Seymour Nebenzal
- Starring: Käthe von Nagy; Jean-Pierre Aumont; Jules Berry; Suzy Prim
- Cinematography: René Gaveau
- Edited by: Marguerite Beaugé; Marguerite Renoir
- Music by: Paul Dessau
- Production company: Production Nero Film
- Distributed by: Sfera Film
- Release date: 4 February 1937
- Running time: 100 minutes
- Country: France
- Language: French

Cargaison blanche or Le Chemin de Rio (English literal translation: White Cargo or The Road To Rio) is a 1937 French crime film directed by Robert Siodmak and starring Käthe von Nagy, Jules Berry and Suzy Prim. in which two journalists go on the trail of gangsters who are kidnapping women to sell in South America. The film was made by Nero Film, with sets designed by the art director Lucien Aguettand. It was remade in 1958 directed by Georges Lacombe.

It was released in the United States in 1950 by Distinguished Films Inc. as French White Cargo, and reissued there in 1952 by Joseph Brenner as Woman Racket. Some sources claim it may also have been known in the USA as Traffic in Souls.

== Main cast ==
- Jean-Pierre Aumont as Henri Voisin
- Käthe von Nagy as Marion Baker
- Jules Berry as Moreno
- Suzy Prim as Estella
- Marcel Dalio as Pedro Férez
- Charles Granval as Blanco
- Gisèle Préville as Béatrice
- Marcelle Praince as Juana, the Madame
- Gaston Modot as Álvarez, her agent
- Mady Berry as Madame Blanco
- Georges Jamin as Henchman Manuel
- Abel Jacquin as Henchman Constantin
- Max Maxudian as Le commandant
- Sylvia Bataille as Yvette Martin
- Annie France as Une girl

== Bibliography ==
- Greco, Joseph. The File on Robert Siodmak in Hollywood, 1941-1951. Universal-Publishers, 1999.
