= Carla Bartheel =

German film actress and photographer

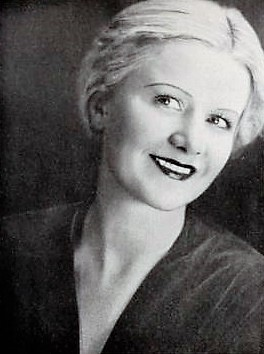
- Bartheel, circa 1932
- Born: Charlotte Franziska Johanna Barthel; 5 July 1902; Schwientochlowitz, German Empire (now Świętochłowice, Silesia, Poland)
- Died: 28 December 1983 (aged 81); West Berlin, West Germany
- Other name: Karla Barteel
- Occupations: Actress, photographer
- Years active: 1927–1933 (film)

Carla Bartheel (born Charlotte Franziska Johanna Barthel; 5 July 1902 – 28 December 1983) was a German film actress and photographer.

== Biography ==
Carla Bartheel was born Charlotte Franziska Johanna Barthel on 5 July 1902. She took acting and singing lessons and planned to train as a dancer, but a cardiac defect prevented this, and led her to acting.

She made her film debut in Addio giovinezza! (1927), starring Walter Slezak, Elena Sangro, and Carmen Boni. Several other silent films soon followed. That same year, she played supporting roles in A Girl of the People, the anti-abortion film Children's Souls Accuse You, and Herkules Maier.

She is perhaps best known for her roles in Todessturz im Zirkus Cesarelli (1927), Die weiße Sonate (1928), and The Hound of the Baskervilles (1929). Her last film appearance was in the Nazi propaganda film Hans Westmar (1933).

After Bartheel retired from acting, she traveled throughout Europe as a photographer. She published two books containing her photographs, Abenteuer an der Eismeerstraße (1939) and Unter Sinai-Beduinen und Mönchen. Eine Reise (1943).

Bartheel died on 28 December 1983 in West Berlin.

== Selected filmography ==
- Children's Souls Accuse You (1927)
- Goodbye Youth (1927)
- The Curse of Vererbung (1927)
- A Girl of the People (1927)
- Der Ladenprinz (1928)
- Under the Lantern (1928)
- Herkules Maier (1928)
- His Strongest Weapon (1928)
- He Goes Right, She Goes Left! (1928)
- The White Sonata (1928)
- Scampolo (1928)
- Tales from the Vienna Woods (1928)
- The Story of a Little Parisian (1928)
- The Youths (1929)
- Der Hund von Baskerville (1929)
- Land Without Women (1929)
- Tragedy of Youth (1929)
- Lux, King of Criminals (1929)
- Katharina Knie (1929)
- The Man Without Love (1929)
- The Dance Goes On (1930)
- The Mask Falls (1931)
- Hans Westmar (1933)
- A City Upside Down (1933)

== Bibliography ==
- Giesen, Rolf. Nazi Propaganda Films: A History and Filmography. McFarland, 2003.
