= Love's Masquerade (1928 film) =

1928 film directed by Augusto Genina

- Directed by: Augusto Genina
- Written by: Augusto Genina (novel); Franz Schulz
- Produced by: Georg C. Horetsky; Seymour Nebenzal
- Starring: Carmen Boni; Hans Junkermann; Olga Engl
- Cinematography: Theodor Sparkuhl; Friedrich Weinmann
- Production company: Nero Film
- Distributed by: National Film
- Release date: 24 July 1928
- Country: Germany
- Languages: Silent; German intertitles

Love's Masquerade (German: Liebeskarneval) is a 1928 German silent film directed by Augusto Genina and starring Carmen Boni, Hans Junkermann and Olga Engl.

The film's art direction was by Robert Neppach.

== Cast ==
- Carmen Boni as Jacqueline, junge Gräfin
- Hans Junkermann as Alter Graf
- Olga Engl as Alte Gräfin
- Jack Trevor as Schriftsteller
- Asta Gundt as Geliebte des Schriftstellers
- Karl Platen as Diener
- Camilla Spira as Zofe
- Teddy Bill as Herr im Auto
- Oreste Bilancia as Freund des Schriftstellers
- Heinrich Gotho

== Bibliography ==
- Alfred Krautz. International directory of cinematographers, set- and costume designers in film, Volume 4. Saur, 1984.
