= Agitated Women =

1927 film

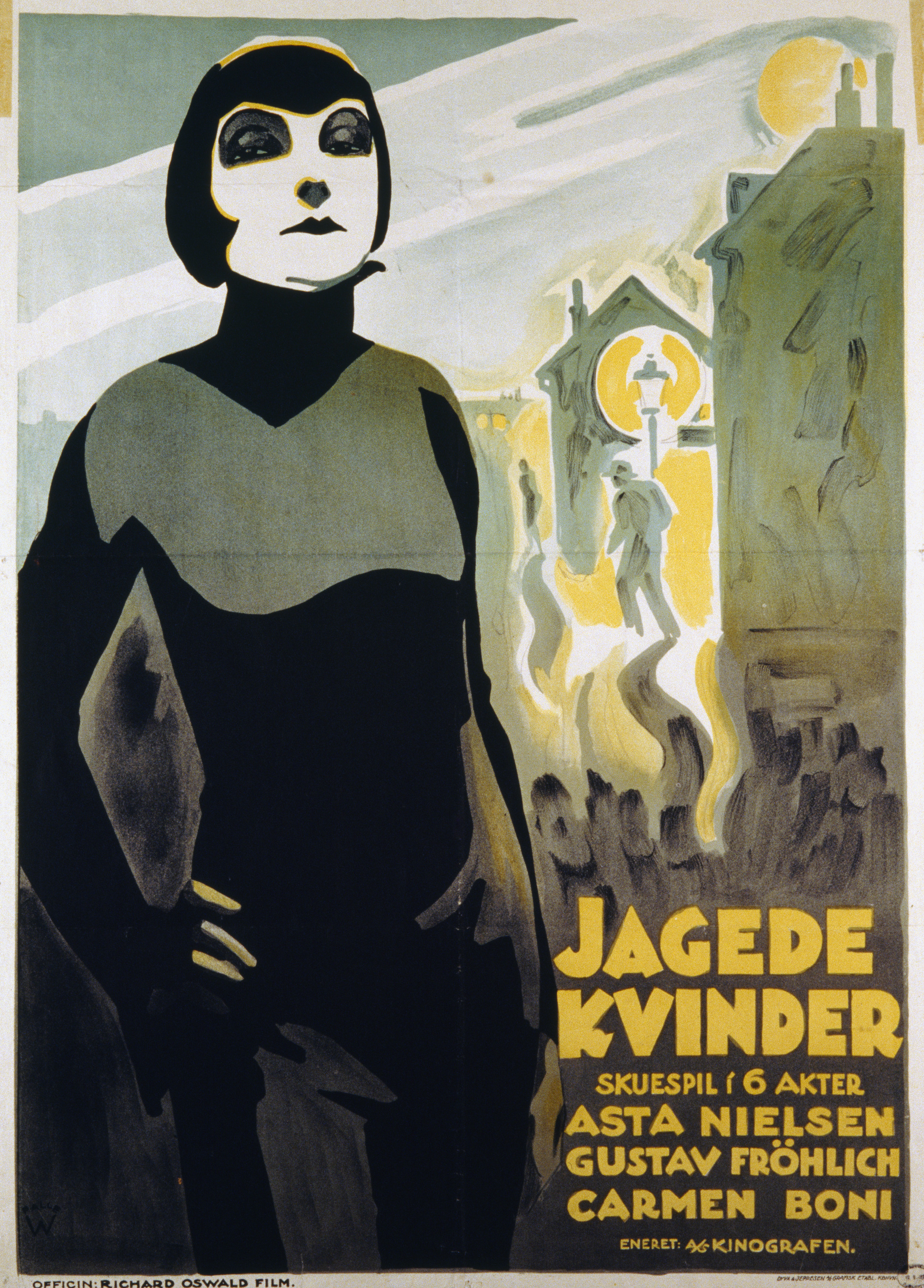
- Danish theatrical release poster
- Directed by: Richard Oswald
- Written by: Herbert Juttke; Georg C. Klaren; Annie von Brabenetz (novel Brettlfliegen)
- Produced by: Richard Oswald
- Starring: Asta Nielsen; Carmen Boni; Gustav Fröhlich
- Cinematography: Edgar S. Ziesemer
- Production company: Richard-Oswald-Produktion
- Distributed by: Deutsch-Nordische Film
- Release date: August 1927
- Running time: 70 minutes
- Country: Germany
- Languages: Silent; German intertitles

Agitated Women (German: Gehetzte Frauen) is a 1927 German silent drama film directed by Richard Oswald and starring Asta Nielsen, Carmen Boni and Gustav Fröhlich. It was shot at the EFA Studios in Berlin. The film's sets were designed by the art director Gustav A. Knauer. The film was released in August 1927.

== Cast ==
- Asta Nielsen as Clarina, Tänzerin
- Carmen Boni as Angelica, Clarinas Tochter
- Gustav Fröhlich as junger Fürst
- Adolphe Engers as Lutschku
- Alexander Murski as Graf Korvin
- Kurt Gerron as Wladimir, Besitzer des 'Maison Mouche'
- Camilla von Hollay as Gildi
- Olga Limburg as Fürstin Natalie Radnay
- Albert Florath as Schuster Kruk
- Jakob Tiedtke as Dr. Baran
- Harry Nestor as Eugen, Diener der Fürstin
- Georg John
- Albert Paul
- Betty Astor
- Lidiya Tridenskaya as Barbara Kruk
- Theodor Pistek
- Kurt Winkler

== Bibliography ==
- Rentschler, Eric, ed. (2013). German Film and Literature. Routledge. ISBN 978-1-136-36873-8.
