= Kohlhiesel's Daughters (1930 film) =

1930 film

- German film poster
- German: Kohlhiesels Töchter
- Directed by: Hans Behrendt
- Written by: Hanns Kräly (play); Julius Urgiß; Wilhelm Raff
- Produced by: Seymour Nebenzal; Henny Porten
- Starring: Henny Porten; Fritz Kampers; Leo Peukert; Heinz-Leo Fischer
- Cinematography: Otto Kanturek
- Edited by: Martha Dübber
- Music by: Robert Gilbert; Felix Günther
- Production company: Nero Film
- Distributed by: Vereinigte Star-Film
- Release date: 5 November 1930
- Running time: 90 minutes
- Country: Germany
- Language: German

Kohlhiesel's Daughters (German: Kohlhiesels Töchter) is a 1930 German comedy film directed by Hans Behrendt and starring Henny Porten, Fritz Kampers, and Leo Peukert. It is an adaptation of the play Kohlhiesel's Daughters by Hanns Kräly, which has been made into a number of films. The film was a significant success at the box office, establishing the silent actress Porten as a sound star. Porten plays the role of twin sisters, one of whom is pleasant and vivacious while the other is boorish and crude.

It was shot at the Babelsberg Studios in Berlin. The film's sets were designed by the art director Franz Schroedter.

== Cast ==
- Henny Porten as Liesel and Gretel, Kohlhiesel's daughters
- Fritz Kampers as Pepi
- Leo Peukert as Kohlhiesel
- Heinz-Leo Fischer as Toni
- Franz Groß as Uncle Xaver
- Karl Harbacher as Seppl, head waiter
- Gustl Gstettenbaur as Gustl, boy waiter
