= The Hearth Turned Off =

1925 film directed by Augusto Genina

- Directed by: Augusto Genina
- Written by: Augusto Genina; Edmondo De Amicis (novel)
- Produced by: Augusto Genina
- Starring: Carmen Boni
- Cinematography: Cesare Cavagna
- Production company: Genina Film
- Release date: March 1925
- Country: Italy
- Languages: Silent; Italian intertitles

The Hearth Turned Off (Italian: Il focolare spento) is a 1925 Italian silent film directed by Augusto Genina and starring Carmen Boni.

== Cast ==
- Jeanne Brindeau as The mother
- Ubaldo Cocchi as The Father
- Arnold Kent as François Gaspari - the son
- Carmen Boni as Marie
- Carlo Tedeschi as Professor Antonio Mazzara
- Rina De Liguoro as Manoela
- Dolly Grey
- Marcella Sabbatini
- Giorgio Bianchini

== Bibliography ==
- Stewart, John. Italian film: a who's who. McFarland, 1994.
