= The White Sonata =

1928 film

- Directed by: Louis Seeman
- Written by: Edmund Hahn (novel); Jacques Bachrach
- Starring: Carla Bartheel; Vladimir Sokoloff; Paul Askonas
- Cinematography: Max Nekut
- Production company: Listo Film
- Distributed by: Liddy Hegewald Film (Germany)
- Release date: 1928
- Country: Austria
- Languages: Silent; German intertitles

The White Sonata (German: Die weiße Sonate) is a 1928 Austrian silent drama film directed by Louis Seeman and starring Carla Bartheel, Vladimir Sokoloff and Paul Askonas.

The film's sets were designed by the art director Emil Stepanek.

== Cast ==
- Carla Bartheel as Dina Dellmar, eine Tänzerin
- Vladimir Sokoloff as Violinvirtuose Dollhofer, Dinas Vater
- Paul Askonas as Fürst Saxenburg, Chef der Geheimpolizei
- Werner Pittschau as Oberleutnant Graf Boris Utomski
- Vivian Gibson as Nata Ignatiew, Frau des Governeurs
- Richard Waldemar as Ramolli
- Hanni Hoess
- Clementine Plessner
- Hans Melzer
- Hanns Marschall
- René Pryken

== Bibliography ==
- James Robert Parish. Hollywood character actors. Arlington House, 1978.
