= Passion for People =

1921 film

- Directed by: Giuseppe Sterni
- Starring: Carmen Boni
- Cinematography: Arrigo Cinotti
- Production company: Sterni Film
- Distributed by: Sterni Film
- Release date: 1921
- Country: Italy
- Languages: Silent; Italian intertitles

Passion for People (Italian: Passione di popolo) is a 1921 Italian silent film directed by Giuseppe Sterni.

== Cast ==
- Alex Bernard
- Carmen Boni
- Annunziata Pasquali
- Giuseppe Sterni
- Cecyl Tryan
- Michele Ugazzi

== Bibliography ==
- Stewart, John. Italian film: a who's who. McFarland, 1994.
