= The Novel of Werther =

1938 film

- Theatrical film poster
- French: Le Roman de Werther
- Directed by: Max Ophüls
- Written by: Hans Wilhelm; Fernand Crommelynck; Max Ophüls
- Based on: The Sorrows of Young Werther by Johann Wolfgang Goethe
- Produced by: Seymour Nebenzal
- Starring: Pierre Richard-Willm; Annie Vernay; Jean Galland; Jean Périer
- Cinematography: Fédote Bourgasoff; Paul Portier; Eugen Schüfftan
- Edited by: Gérard Bensdorp; Jean Sacha
- Music by: Paul Dessau
- Production company: Nero Film
- Distributed by: Monopol Film
- Release date: 14 December 1938
- Running time: 85 minutes
- Country: France
- Language: French

The Novel of Werther (French: Le Roman de Werther) is a 1938 French historical drama film directed by Max Ophüls and starring Pierre Richard-Willm, Annie Vernay and Jean Galland. It is based on the 1774 novel The Sorrows of Young Werther by Goethe.

The film was made by Nero Film, a company run by German exiles who had left following the Nazi rise to power.

== Cast ==
- Pierre Richard-Willm as Werther
- Annie Vernay as Charlotte
- Jean Galland as Albert
- Paulette Pax as Aunt Emma
- Jean Périer as President
- Edmond Beauchamp as murderer
- Georges Bever as chamberlain
- Geno Ferny as portraitist
- Fernand Blot as Werther's colleague
- Denise Kerny as the right one
- Henri Guisol as Schertz, the clerk
- Roger Legris as Franz, valet
- Jean Buquet as little Gustave
- Maurice Schutz as le sonneur
- Léonce Corne asle majordome
- Philippe Richard as Grand Duke
- Charles Nossent as le cocher
- Léon Larive as comedian
- Georges Vitray as bailiff
- Génia Vaury as girl
- Henri Beaulieu
- Henri Darbrey
- Pierre Darteuil
- Maurice Devienne
- Martial Rèbe
- Robert Rollis
