= The Mayor's Dilemma =

1939 film directed by Raymond Bernard

- Directed by: Raymond Bernard
- Written by: Jean Anouilh; Leo Mittler; Victor Trivas
- Produced by: Seymour Nebenzal; André Chemel; Ralph Baum
- Starring: Annie Vernay; Saturnin Fabre; Fernand Charpin
- Cinematography: Léon Bellet; Jean Brévignon; Robert Lefebvre
- Edited by: Charlotte Guilbert
- Music by: Darius Milhaud
- Production company: Nero Film
- Distributed by: Gray-Film
- Release date: 23 March 1939
- Running time: 105 minutes
- Country: France
- Language: French

The Mayor's Dilemma (French: Les otages) is a 1939 French drama film directed by Raymond Bernard and starring Annie Vernay, Saturnin Fabre and Fernand Charpin. It was shot at the Billancourt Studios in Paris and on location in Chézy-sur-Marne. The film's sets were designed by the art directors André Barsacq and Jean Perrier.

== Cast ==
- Annie Vernay as Annie Beaumont
- Saturnin Fabre as Rossignol, le châtelain
- Fernand Charpin as Beaumont, le maire
- Dorville as Rodillar, le braconnier
- Pierre Larquey as Fabien, l'huissier
- Pierre Labry as Rameau, le coiffeur
- Noël Roquevert as Le garde-champêtre
- Palmyre Levasseur as Mme Rossignol
- Georges Douking as Brazoux
- Mady Berry as Maria
- Jean Pâqui as Pierre Rossignol
- Marguerite Pierry as Madame Fabien
- Florian as Le gendarme
- Léon Larive as Le cafetier
- Marcel Pérès as Tartagnac
- Jean Sinoël as Le père Labiche
- Paul Villé as Le chef de gare

== Bibliography ==
- Bessy, Maurice & Chirat, Raymond. Histoire du cinéma français: 1935-1939. Pygmalion, 1986.
- Crisp, Colin. Genre, Myth and Convention in the French Cinema, 1929-1939. Indiana University Press, 2002.
- Rège, Philippe. Encyclopedia of French Film Directors, Volume 1. Scarecrow Press, 2009.
