= The Prisoners of Shanghai =

1927 German film

- German film poster
- German: Die Gefangene von Shanghai
- Directed by: Géza von Bolváry; Augusto Genina
- Written by: Curt J. Braun; Gennaro Righelli; Werner Scheff
- Produced by: Georg C. Horetsky; Seymour Nebenzal
- Starring: Carmen Boni; Jack Trevor; Bernhard Goetzke
- Cinematography: Hans Karl Gottschalk
- Production company: Nero Film
- Distributed by: Bavaria Film
- Release date: 22 September 1927
- Running time: 79 minutes
- Country: Germany
- Languages: Silent; German intertitles

The Prisoners of Shanghai (German: Die Gefangene von Shanghai) is a 1927 German silent drama film directed by Géza von Bolváry and Augusto Genina and starring Carmen Boni, Jack Trevor, and Bernhard Goetzke. The film's sets were designed by the art director István Szirontai Lhotka. It focuses on similar themes to the subsequent Hollywood films Shanghai Express (1932) and The Bitter Tea of General Yen (1933).

== Synopsis ==
Mary, the wife of a British consul Ralph Sinclair, is detained by Chinese General Hai Lung. He offers to spare her husband from execution if she will become his lover.

== Cast ==
- Carmen Boni as Maria
- Jack Trevor as Ralph Sinclair, English consul
- Bernhard Goetzke as General Hai Lung
- Kurt Vespermann as Teddy Knickerbocker, reporter
- Agnes Petersen-Mozzuchinowa as Chinese Li
- Nien Soen Ling as General's adjutant

== Bibliography ==
- Trumpbour, John. Selling Hollywood to the World: US and European Struggles for Mastery of the Global Film Industry, 1920-1950. Cambridge University Press, 2007.
