= The Crisis is Over =

1934 film

- Directed by: Robert Siodmak
- Written by: Jacques Constant; Frederick Kohner; Max Kolpé; Curt Siodmak
- Produced by: Seymour Nebenzal
- Starring: Albert Préjean; Danielle Darrieux; Marcel Carpentier
- Cinematography: Maurice Forster; Eugen Schüfftan
- Music by: Jean Lenoir; Franz Waxman
- Production company: Nero Films
- Distributed by: Paramount Pictures
- Release date: 5 October 1934
- Running time: 74 minutes
- Country: France
- Language: French

The Crisis is Over (French: La crise est finie) is a 1934 French musical comedy film directed by Robert Siodmak and starring Albert Préjean, Danielle Darrieux and Marcel Carpentier. Many of those who worked on the film were exiles from Nazi Germany. It was made by Nero Films, which until recently had been based in Berlin.

The plot is about the challenges that a troupe of young comedians faces as they decide to put on their own show.

== Cast ==
- Albert Préjean as Marcel
- Danielle Darrieux as Nicole
- Marcel Carpentier as Bernouillin
- Pedro Elviro as Hercule
- Paul Velsa as Le machiniste
- Paul Escoffier as Le manager
- Milly Mathis as La gouvernante
- Jeanne Marie-Laurent as La mère de Nicole
- Régine Barry as Lola Garcin
- Jane Loury as Mme Bernouillin
- Suzanne Dehelly as Olga
- René Lestelly as Alex
- Alla Donell as Une girl
- Wanda Barcella as Une girl
- De Silva as Une girl
- Sherry as Une girl
- Véra Ossipova as Une girl
- Adrienne Trenkel as Une girl
- Albert Malbert as Le commissaire
- Jacques Beauvais as Le maître d'hôtel
- Raymond Blot as Un impresario

== Bibliography ==
- Bock, Hans-Michael & Bergfelder, Tim. The Concise CineGraph. Encyclopedia of German Cinema. Berghahn Books, 2009.
