= Kameradschaft =

1931 film

- Swedish theatrical release poster by Eric Rohman
- Directed by: G. W. Pabst
- Screenplay by: Peter Martin Lampel; Herbert Rappaport; Ladislaus Vajda
- Story by: Karl Otten
- Produced by: Seymour Nebenzal
- Starring: Alexander Granach; Fritz Kampers; Daniel Mendaille; Ernst Busch; Elisabeth Wendt; Gustav Püttjer
- Cinematography: Fritz Arno Wagner
- Edited by: Jean Oser
- Music by: G. von Rigelius
- Production companies: Nero-Film; Gaumont-Franco Film-Aubert
- Distributed by: Vereinigte Star-Film; Cineldé; Associated Cinemas
- Release dates: 17 November 1931 (Germany); 29 January 1932 (France); 8 November 1932 (US)
- Running time: 88 minutes
- Countries: Weimar Republic; France
- Languages: German; French

Kameradschaft (English: Comradeship, known in France as La Tragédie de la mine) is a 1931 dramatic film directed by Austrian director G. W. Pabst. The French-German co-production drama is noted for combining expressionism and realism.

The film concerns a mine disaster where German miners rescue French miners from an underground fire and explosion. The story takes place in the Lorraine–Saar regions, along the border between France and Germany. It is based on one of the worst industrial accidents in history, the Courrières mine disaster in 1906 in Courrières, France, where rescue efforts after a coal dust explosion were hampered by the lack of trained mine rescuers. Expert teams from Paris and miners from the Westphalia region of Germany came to the assistance of the French miners. There were 1,099 fatalities, including children.

Kameradschaft in German means a bond between soldiers or those who have similar opinions and are in friendship. The word is similar to comradeship, camaraderie or fellowship.

== Plot ==
Two boys, one French and the other German, are playing marbles near the border. When the game is over, both boys claim to have won, and complain that the other is trying to steal their marbles. Their fathers, border guards, come and separate the boys.

In 1919, at the end of World War I the border changes, and an underground mine is divided, with a gate dividing the two sections. An economic downturn and rising unemployment adds to tension, as German workers seek employment in France but are turned away, since there are hardly enough jobs for French workers. In the French part of the mine fires break out, which they try to contain by building brick walls, with the bricklayers wearing breathing apparatus. The Germans continue to work in their section, but start to feel the heat from the French fires.

Three German miners visit a French dance hall and one almost provokes a fight when Francoise, a young French woman, refuses to dance with him. The rejected miner thinks it is because he's German, but it is actually because she is tired. She and her boyfriend, Emile, a miner, leave, and she expresses her distress over the stories about fires and explosions in the mine. The next morning, he stops in to say goodbye to her before she leaves for Paris, then he and her brother, Jean, another miner, leave for work.

The fire gets out of control, igniting gas and causing roof collapses that traps many French miners. In response, the German miner, Wittkopp, appeals successfully to his bosses to send a rescue team. As the German rescue team leave in two lorries, its leader explains to his wife that the French are men with women and children and he would hope that they would come to his aid in similar circumstances. In the mine itself, a trio of German miners breaks through the grille on the border between the two countries. On the French side, an old retired miner sneaks into the shaft hoping to rescue his young grandson. The Germans rescue the French miners, not without difficulties. After all the survivors are rescued, there is a big party with speeches about friendship between the French and Germans. French and German officials then reinstall the underground border grille and things return to the way they were before.

== Cast ==
- Alexander Granach as Kasper
- Fritz Kampers as Wilderer
- Daniel Mendaille as Jean Leclerc
- Ernst Busch as Wittkopp
- Elisabeth Wendt as Anna Wittkopp
- Gustav Püttjer as Kaplan
- Oskar Höcker as Mine foreman
- Héléna Manson as Rose, Albert's wife
- Andrée Ducret as Françoise Leclerc
- Alex Bernard as Grandfather Jacques, Le Vieux Mineur
- Pierre-Louis as Georges, Jacques's grandson
- Georges Charlia as Emile
- Willem Holsboer as German mine engineer
- Marcel Lesieur as Albert
- Georges Tourreil as Engineer Vidal
- Fritz Wendhausen as German mine director

== Production ==
Although the scenes which take place inside the mine look extremely real, they were, in fact, sets designed by Erno Metzner and Karl Vollbrecht, who were meticulous about their authenticity and detail. All the scenes involving the mines were done in a converted Hangar in Berlin. This film was funded by Gaumont, a French studio, and Nero-Film, a German studio, making it a Franco-German production.

As with his previous film, Westfront 1918, his first talkie, Pabst did not utilize the soundproof booths which Hollywood studios used to mask the sound of the camera from the microphone, instead employing a sound-proof case called a "blimp", which gave the freedom to move the camera around.

== Critical response ==
Film critic Daniel Curran calls the film "A heartfelt plea for peace and internationalism." While calling the narrative over-sentimental, Curran wrote, "Pabst's plea for a peaceful future is both noble and honest, his direction of the heartbreak and devastation [is] enhanced by the brilliant cinematography by Fritz Arno Wagner and Robert Baberske, and the frighteningly real set design by Erno Metzner and Karl Vollbrecht."

When the film was released in the United States in 1932, Mordaunt Hall, film critic for The New York Times, praised the realism and the screenplay, writing "[Kameradschaft is] one of the finest examples of realism that has come to the screen ... [the] scenes in the mine are so real that one never thinks of them as being staged ... [and] [t]hroughout the length of this tale of horror one feels as though one were permitted through some uncanny force to look into all parts of the mine ...All the noises and sounds are wonderfully natural."

Variety also gave the film a positive review, praising the direction, story, and cinematography, writing that "Pabst has made [the film] a powerful recounting and accentuates more the happenings than the men ... Photography and architecture are excellent and the sound is clear. Picture is sometimes abrupt and there are some superfluous scenes but this is an outstanding film."

In a retrospective review, American film critic Pauline Kael commented, "In the early 30s it was still possible for large audiences to believe in the symbolic revolutionary meaning of smashing through artificial frontiers for the sake of natural brotherhood. This movie belongs to a genre that has disappeared."

In a list of the 100 most important German films, compiled in 1994 by the Association of German Cinémathèques, Kameradschaft was placed at #77.

== Accolades ==
Kameradschaft was named by the National Board of Review as the Best Foreign Film of 1932.

== See also ==
- List of German films of 1919–1932
