= The Testament of Dr. Mabuse =

1933 film by Fritz Lang

- Austrian film poster
- Directed by: Fritz Lang
- Written by: Thea von Harbou; Fritz Lang
- Produced by: Seymour Nebenzal
- Starring: Rudolf Klein-Rogge; Otto Wernicke; Oscar Beregi Sr. Gustav Diessl
- Cinematography: Karl Vash; Fritz Arno Wagner
- Edited by: Conrad von Molo (Note: This refers to the German version of the film only.); Lothar Wolff (Note: This refers to the French version of the film only.)
- Music by: Hans Erdmann
- Production company: Nero-Film
- Release date: 21 April 1933 (Hungary)
- Running time: 124 minutes
- Country: Germany
- Language: German

The Testament of Dr. Mabuse (German: Das Testament des Dr. Mabuse), also called The Last Will of Dr. Mabuse, is a 1933 German crime-thriller film directed by Fritz Lang. The movie is a sequel to Lang's silent film Dr. Mabuse the Gambler (1922) and features many cast and crew members from Lang's previous films. Dr. Mabuse (Rudolf Klein-Rogge) is in an insane asylum where he is found frantically writing his crime plans. When Mabuse's criminal plans begin to be implemented, Inspector Lohmann (Otto Wernicke) tries to find the solution with clues from gangster Thomas Kent (Gustav Diessl), the institutionalized Hofmeister (Karl Meixner) and Professor Baum (Oscar Beregi Sr.) who becomes obsessed with Dr. Mabuse.

The Testament of Dr. Mabuse was based on elements of author Norbert Jacques' unfinished novel Mabuse's Colony. It was Lang's second sound film for Nero-Film and was his final collaboration with screenwriter Thea von Harbou, then his wife. To promote the film to a foreign market, a French-language version of the film was made by Lang with the same sets but different actors with the title Le Testament du Dr. Mabuse.

According to Siegfried Kracauer, Lang intended the film to suggest the Mabuse-like qualities of Adolf Hitler, who was on his rise to become Chancellor of Germany while the film was being written. When Hitler came to power, Joseph Goebbels became Minister of Propaganda and banned the film in Germany, suggesting that the film would undermine the audience's confidence in its statesmen. The French-language and German-language versions of the film were released in Europe while several versions of the film were released in the United States. The sequel The Thousand Eyes of Dr. Mabuse (1960) was also directed by Lang. Although it initially received a mixed reception, critics would later review the film favorably, and it has influenced filmmakers Claude Chabrol, Artur Brauner and Christopher Nolan.

== Plot ==
Chased by a bunch of criminals, disgraced former police detective Hofmeister seeks refuge in a noisy print shop. He telephones his former superior Inspector Karl Lohmann and explains frantically that he has discovered a huge criminal conspiracy. Before he can disclose the identity of its mastermind, the lights go out, shots are fired, and Hofmeister succumbs to madness. He vanishes only to be found later singing every time he feels watched, and he is institutionalized at the asylum run by Professor Baum.

Professor Baum introduces the case of Dr. Mabuse, the criminal mastermind and hypnotist who ten years earlier went mad. Mabuse spends his days frantically writing detailed plans for crimes while a criminal gang is committing them according to "the plans of the Doctor", with whom they confer only from behind a curtain. When Baum's colleague Dr. Kramm by chance discovers that recent crimes implement Mabuse's writings, Kramm is shot by the gang's execution squad, Hardy and Bredow. A clue scratched in a glass window pane at Hofmeister's crime scene causes Lohmann to suspect Mabuse. On arrival at the asylum, Baum reveals that Mabuse has died. When Lohmann disparagingly talks about "Mabuse the criminal", Baum emphatically speaks about "Mabuse the genius", whose brilliance would have destroyed a corrupt world.

Baum continues to study Mabuse's writings and communes with the ghost of Dr. Mabuse. The spirit of Mabuse speaks about an "unlimited reign of crime" and merges with the Professor's silhouette. During the same night, a hidden figure confers with sections of his organisation, preparing various crimes such as an attack on a chemical plant, robbing a bank, counterfeiting, poisoning water and destroying harvests. One of the gang members, Thomas Kent, is conflicted between his criminal work, which he needs to do for money, and his affection for a young woman named Lilli. Devoted to Kent, Lilli begs him to confide in her. Kent finally confesses his past and his current situation to her. The two decide to inform the police but are abducted and locked in the strange meeting room with the curtain. The hidden figure announces their death when they discover that the curtained alcove contains only a loudspeaker and that there is a time bomb. After several escape attempts have failed, they flood the place to lessen the impact of the explosion and break free when the time bomb goes off.

Meanwhile, the police are besieging a flat where several gangsters, including Hardy and Bredow, are staying. After a shootout, Hardy commits suicide while the other gangsters surrender. As Bredow testifies that they assassinated Dr. Kramm in the vicinity of the asylum, Lohmann arranges a confrontation between the gangsters and the Professor, which proves inconclusive. On Kent and Lilli's arrival, Baum's shocked reaction to Kent makes Lohmann suspicious. Lohmann and Kent visit the asylum, where they discover that Baum is the mastermind and has planned an attack on a chemical plant that night. Lohmann and Kent go to the exploding plant, where they discover Baum watching from afar. Baum flees to the asylum with Lohmann and Kent pursuing. Mabuse's spirit leads Baum to Hofmeister in his cell where he introduces himself as Dr. Mabuse, ending Hofmeister's shock. Baum tries to kill Hofmeister but is stopped by guards, just as Lohmann and Kent arrive. The final scene shows the insane Baum in the cell, tearing Mabuse's writings to shreds.

== Cast ==
- Rudolf Klein-Rogge as Dr. Mabuse
- Otto Wernicke as Inspector Lohmann
- Karl Meixner as Detective Hofmeister
- Oscar Beregi Sr. as Professor Baum
- Theodor Loos as Dr. Kramm
- Gustav Diessl as Thomas Kent
- Wera Liessem as Lilli

- Rudolf Schündler as Hardy
- Oskar Höcker as Bredow
- Theo Lingen as Karetzki
- Hadrian Maria Netto as Nicolai Griforiew
- Camilla Spira as Juwelen-Anna
- Georg John as Baum's servant
- Klaus Pohl as Müller, Lohmann's assistant

Cast notes:

- Wernicke reprises the character Inspector Lohmann, a role he first played a year earlier in Lang's film, M.

== Production ==
=== Development ===
Norbert Jacques wrote the original Dr. Mabuse books in the style of other popular thrillers in Europe at the time, such as Nick Carter, Fantomas, and Fu Manchu. Jacques expanded the traits of these books to include critiques on Weimar Germany. In 1930, Jacques was approached by a film producer to develop a story for a new Dr. Mabuse film with a female villain. This caused Jacques to start writing a new novel called Mabuse's Colony. In the novel, a character named Frau Kristine obtains a copy of Mabuse's testament which outlines plans for a future world of terrorism and crime that she uses.

At this time, Lang and his wife Thea von Harbou were developing the film M. Von Harbou and Lang were friends with Jacques since creating the first Mabuse film Dr. Mabuse the Gambler, and they went on vacation with each other. Lang asked Jacques for help with the screenplay for M and asked for suggestions for a new Mabuse project. Jacques sent Lang his unfinished work for Mabuse's Colony. Lang used the idea of Mabuse's will from the story and began working on an outline to what would become The Testament of Dr. Mabuse.

Using the outline that Lang proposed, Jacques signed a contract in July 1931 for the movie to be written by von Harbou and directed by Lang based on Lang's own outline. The film was released in tandem with Jacques's book. Jacques' contributions are not mentioned in the film. The Testament of Dr. Mabuse is a direct sequel to Dr. Mabuse the Gambler and is related to the film M which features the Inspector Lohmann character.

=== Pre-production ===
Many members of the cast and crew had worked with Lang on his earlier films. Rudolf Klein-Rogge returned to play Dr. Mabuse as he did in Dr. Mabuse the Gambler. Klein-Rogge acted in Lang's earlier films including Destiny, Die Nibelungen, Metropolis and Spies. Otto Wernicke reprises his role as Inspector Lohmann from Lang's M. Klaus Pohl plays Lohmann's assistant Müller. Pohl acted in Lang's Woman in the Moon and in an uncredited role in M. Theodor Loos, who portrays Dr. Kramm, had earlier appeared in both Metropolis (as Josaphat) and M (as Inspector Groeber).

The Testament of Dr. Mabuse was Lang's second film for the company Nero-Film and producer Seymour Nebenzal. The film would be the last film collaboration between Lang and his wife Thea von Harbou, who had worked with Lang on all his directorial efforts since Destiny. Lang's relationship with von Harbou was ending and the two would file divorce papers during 1933. Cinematographer Fritz Arno Wagner returned to work with Lang. Their film credits together include M, Spies and Destiny.

=== Filming ===
A ghostly Dr. Mabuse announces his testament of crime. After the film's release, director Fritz Lang felt these supernatural scenes should not have been included.

Lang filmed The Testament of Dr. Mabuse at the end of 1932 and the beginning of 1933, desiring to have the film viewed worldwide. In his film, where gun-play, fires, or explosions are needed, Lang often used real weapons. In the opening scene, during a power outage, a stunt actor did the gun play. Cinematographer Fritz Arno Wagner stated that he spent most of the production in a state of panic due to the way Lang would endanger his crew. The film is generally filmed in a realistic style with the exception of Mabuse's ghostly appearances throughout the film. Lang admitted later in interviews that if he could re-do the film, he would not have included these supernatural scenes.

Wagner filmed the explosion scenes at the factory on location during nighttime. These explosion scenes were the first scenes of the film to be filmed before returning to the studio to film the rest of the film. The film crew had three weeks to prepare for the factory scene by clearing trees and bringing in some artificial trees to match Lang's idea for the scene. The explosion was triggered by Lang himself.

During the early years of sound films before dubbing and subtitling, one way to present a film to a foreign audience was to record the film with a translated screenplay with foreign-language cast. As this was a time-consuming and expensive procedure, most filmmakers who did this tended to only make one alternative language feature. Producer Seymour Nebenzal felt that creating this alternative version would enhance international sales for The Testament of Dr. Mabuse. The French-language screenplay was adapted by René Sti. Lang was fluent in French and directed The Testament of Dr. Mabuse in both French and German. Actor Karl Meixner played Hofmeister in both versions of the film as he was bilingual. Rudolf Klein-Rogge also features as Mabuse in the French version with his lines being dubbed. The French version, titled Le Testament du docteur Mabuse, was edited by Lothar Wolff in France while the film was still in production.

=== Post-production ===
For the film, Lang commissioned a composer for the first time. Hans Erdmann created the opening theme and the music played during Professor Baum's madness. The soundtrack in the film is deceptive. As in Lang's M, the film's music and sound are a subtle mix of actual silence with accompanying music and more or less realistic sound effects. Lang worked with his editor Conrad von Molo directly on the post-production process. Lang was known for making very long films and to suit foreign fashions, editor Lothar Wolff was contracted to shorten the French-language version. This version deletes parts from the romantic sub-plot between Lilli and Kent.

== Release ==
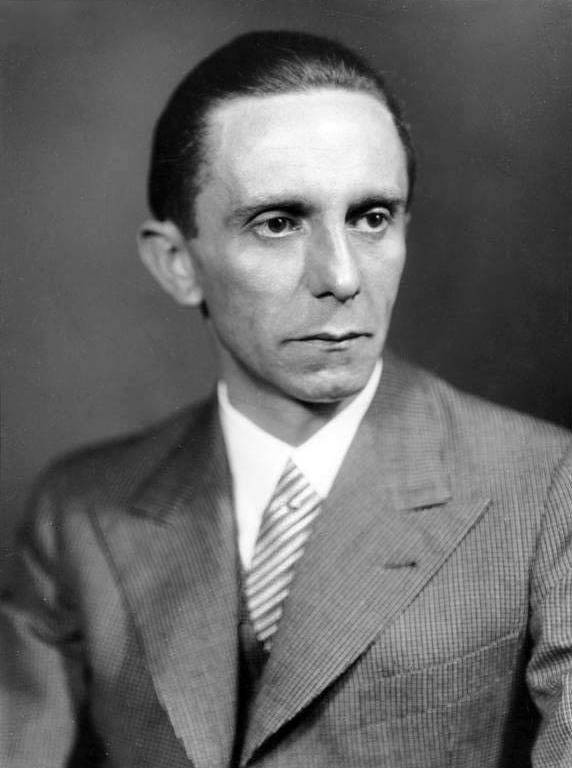
Joseph Goebbels (pictured) withheld the release of Testament of Dr. Mabuse, stating that the film "showed that an extremely dedicated group of people are perfectly capable of overthrowing any state with violence".

The film was scheduled for release on March 24, 1933, at the UFA-Palast am Zoo, the same theater that hosted the original premiere of Dr. Mabuse the Gambler in 1922. Adolf Hitler came to power at the end of January 1933, and on March 14 he established the new Ministry of Public Enlightenment and Propaganda headed by Joseph Goebbels. Lang had not finished editing the film, and would not have a print for Goebbels to view until March 23. After a screening for Goebbels, he declared that the premiere would be delayed for technical reasons. Goebbels hosted a meeting at his home between himself, Lang and several other German filmmakers on discussions on what films would be permitted by Nazi censorship. Goebbels referred to Lang's films as the style that Hitler wanted for Nazi Germany.

By March 30, the Ministry of Propaganda banned The Testament of Dr. Mabuse as a menace to public health and safety. Goebbels stated that he would not accept the film as it "showed that an extremely dedicated group of people are perfectly capable of overthrowing any state with violence". During the 1940s, Lang stated that a meeting occurred between Goebbels and himself, in which, in particular, Goebbels expressed his admiration for Lang's 1927 film Metropolis. Goebbels expressed the desire for Lang to work for him to create films for the Nazis. This offer caused Lang to leave Germany to France that very night. Goebbels' diary makes no mention of such a meeting and Lang's passport also shows that he did not leave until June and made repeated trips between France and Germany throughout 1933.

The German version of The Testament of Dr. Mabuse premiered on April 21, 1933, in Budapest, Hungary with a playing time of 124 minutes. The French-language version was distributed through Europe. The French with English subtitles was released in the United States in 1943 with the title The Last Will of Dr. Mabuse. In 1951, the German version was released in a 75-minute version with the title The Crimes of Dr.Mabuse which featured an English dub. The English subtitles for the 1943 release and the 1952 dub added allusions to Adolf Hitler that were not part of the original script. The Testament of Dr. Mabuse was first shown publicly in Germany on August 24, 1961, with a 111-minute running time. In 1973, the unedited German version of the film was released in the United States with the title The Testament of Dr. Mabuse with English subtitles.

Lang wrote a "Screen Foreword" for the American release:

The film was made as an allegory to show Hitler's processes of terrorism. Slogans and doctrines of the Third Reich have been put into the mouths of criminals in the film. Thus I hoped to expose the masked Nazi theory of the necessity to deliberately destroy everything which is precious to a people. ... Then, when everything collapsed and they were thrown into utter despair, they would try to find help in the 'New order'.

German cultural critic Siegfried Kracauer, in his book From Caligari to Hitler (1947), commented that Lang's comment "smacks of hindsight", but his own analysis of the film indicates that it "foreshadows Nazi practices", and retroactively reveals Dr. Mabuse the Gambler, Lang's first Mabuse film, to be "one of those deep-rooted premonitions which spread over the German post[-World War I] screen". Still, despite the Nazi ban of the film, Kracauer is dubious that the average German film-goer would have seen the analogy between Baum/Mabuse's elaborate criminal organization and the Nazis.

=== Reception ===
In 1938, Goebbels wrote that on looking at the film that he was "struck by the dullness of its portrayal, the coarseness of its construction, and the inadequacy of its acting". Despite Goebbels' statement, he would present the film uncensored from time to time in private screening rooms for close personal friends. On the French release, The New York Times wrote that "it is the French version of Fritz Lang's production, "Le Testament du Dr. Mabuse" ("Dr. Mabuse's Will"). It is a hallucinating and horrifying story, depicted with great power and the extraordinary beauty of photography that Lang has led his admirers to expect." At the Hungarian premiere of the German-language print in 1933, Variety wrote that the film "...certainly shows the influence of American mystery pictures. The story is very long-winded and even an ingenious director like Fritz Lang could not prevent its being rather slow-moving in places."

Bosley Crowther wrote a negative review in The New York Times on the film's 1943 release, stating that "it is a good, old film, well played and beautifully directed – but a battered antique, none the less." On the 1973 re-release, the same newspaper wrote a positive review of the film, stating that it "yields a sensational torrent of images that almost make the early nineteen-seventies seem tame" and "while this "Mabuse" lacks most of the surrealistic effects and the dazzling hallucinations that gave its predecessor such magic, it's rich in the images and the shocks at which Lang excelled."

Some years later, Siegfried Kracauer, writing in From Caligari to Hitler, accuses the film of "repetitious shock effects [which] tend to neutralize each other, [resulting in] monotony rather than an increase in suspense." He deems the film to be inferior to Lang's 1931 film M. Nevertheless, he goes on the describe several sequences in the film which illustrate Lang's "uncanny genius for evoking terror out of the simplest things". He also finds fault with the lack of any strong positive character the audience can identify with, since the police captain who destroys the criminal organization is a colorless bureaucratic official whose "victory lacks moral significance". If any in the film's audience was aware of any allegorical connection between the criminals and the Nazis, there is no-one for them to turn to as an alternative to the Nazis. Kracauer writes: "As so often with Lang, the law triumphs and the lawless glitters. This anti-Nazi film betrays the power of Nazi spirit over minds insufficiently equipped to counter its peculiar fascination."

Modern critical reception of the film has been generally positive. Channel 4 gave the film a four stars out of five rating, describing the film as a "sensational crime drama" and "some of the dialogue is clunky, much of the acting...is alien to modern audiences...The final sequence involving the destruction of a huge chemical works and a car chase through eerily lit woods, round hairpin bends and over a closing level crossing is one of the triumphs of early cinema." TV Guide gave the film a five out of five star rating terming it "a haunting, suspenseful sequel". Critic Leonard Maltin gave the film three and a half stars out of four and compared it to Dr. Mabuse The Gambler stating that it is "less stylized but no less entertaining". Leslie Halliwell gave it two of four stars: "Fast-moving penny dreadful, alleged by its director to be a denouncing of the doctrines of Hitler, but showing little evidence of being more than a very slick entertainment." The online film database AllMovie rated the film four stars out five, stating that by "mixing several genres including cop drama, mystery, and horror, Lang created a rare hybrid picture full of striking characters and images."

=== Legacy ===
After the film's initial release, producer Seymour Nebenzal used scenes from the car chase in The Testament of Dr. Mabuse for his own production of Le roi des Champs-Élysées (1934) featuring Buster Keaton. Producer Artur Brauner cited the Dr. Mabuse films as the reason he went into the film industry, describing it as "the most exciting film I've ever seen". Brauner later bought the rights to the Dr. Mabuse films and hired Fritz Lang to film a sequel titled The Thousand Eyes of Dr. Mabuse. The film was released in 1960 and was Lang's final film as a director. In 1962, a remake of The Testament of Dr. Mabuse was released by director Werner Klingler.

Director Claude Chabrol identified The Testament of Dr. Mabuse as his primary inspiration to become a filmmaker. Chabrol made his own Mabuse-inspired film that was released in 1990 titled Dr. M. The 2008 film The Dark Knight features a version of The Joker inspired by Mabuse. Throughout the film, the character recites monologues promoting chaos and disorder which borrow heavily from Mabuse's own in 1933's The Testament of Dr. Mabuse. Director Christopher Nolan has stated: "I think I made Jonah (Nolan's brother) watch Fritz Lang’s Dr. Mabuse prior to writing the Joker".

=== Home media ===
A Region 1 DVD of The Testament of Dr. Mabuse was released by The Criterion Collection on May 18, 2004. This DVD release consists of two discs and contains both the German-language and French-language versions of the film. Film critic Dave Kehr wrote the German print is "the definite version". The German print of the film on the DVD is missing small parts of the film and runs at 121 minutes.

The film was also released by Eureka! for its Masters of Cinema series, first as a Region 2 DVD on October 19, 2009, which was part of a box set titled The Complete Fritz Lang Mabuse Box Set (which included the two other Mabuse films directed by Lang: Dr. Mabuse the Gambler and The Thousand Eyes of Dr. Mabuse) and later as a single Region B Blu-ray on September 24, 2012. Both releases include an audio commentary by David Kalat.
