= Latin Quarter (1929 film) =

1929 film directed by Augusto Genina

- Directed by: Augusto Genina
- Written by: Curt J. Braun; Fritz Falkenstein; Augusto Genina
- Based on: Quartier Latin by Maurice Dekobra
- Produced by: Georg Jacoby
- Starring: Gina Manès; Carmen Boni; Helga Thomas; Iván Petrovich
- Cinematography: Eduard Hoesch
- Production company: Orplid-Film
- Distributed by: Messtro-Film
- Release date: 3 June 1929
- Running time: 115 minutes
- Country: Germany
- Languages: Silent; German intertitles

Latin Quarter (German title: Quartier Latin) is a 1929 German silent drama film directed by Augusto Genina and starring Gina Manès, Carmen Boni and Helga Thomas. It was based on a novel by Maurice Dekobra. It was shot at the Staaken Studios and on location in Paris. The film's art direction was by Franz Schroedter. It premiered at the Ufa-Palast am Zoo in Berlin.

== Cast ==
- Gina Manès as Prinzessin Bolinsky (Salome)
- Carmen Boni as Louisette Mercier (Mimi)
- Helga Thomas as Laura
- Iván Petrovich as Ralph O'Connor Rodolpho
- Gaston Jacquet as Baron Harvey
- Maurice Braddell as Mario
- Augusto Bandini as Jaques
- Nino Ottavi as Jean
- Magnus Stifter as Diener

== Bibliography ==
- Goble, Alan (1999). The Complete Index to Literary Sources in Film. Berlin: Walter de Gruyter. ISBN 978-3111816142.
