= Alexander Granach =

German-Austrian actor (1890-1945)

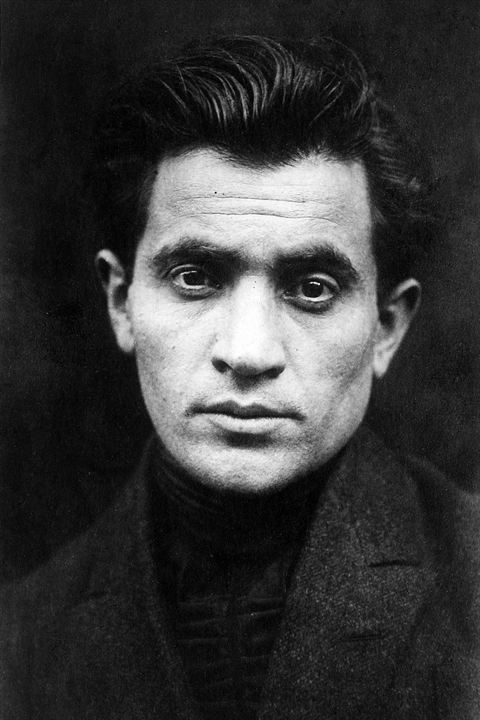
- Alexander Granach c. 1920
- Born: Jessaja Szajko Gronach; April 18, 1890; Werbowitz, Galicia, Austria-Hungary
- Died: March 14, 1945 (aged 54); New York City, New York, U.S.
- Resting place: Montefiore Cemetery
- Other name: Jessaja Granach
- Occupation: Actor
- Years active: 1920–1944
- Spouse: Martha Guttmann (m. 1914; div. 1921)
- Partner: Lotte Lieven (1933–1945, his death)
- Children: Gad Granach

Alexander Granach (born Jessaja Szajko Gronach; April 18, 1890 – March 14, 1945) was a German-Austrian actor in the 1920s and 1930s who emigrated to the United States in 1938.

== Life and career ==
Granach was born Jessaja Szajko Gronach in Werbowitz (Wierzbowce/Werbiwci) (Austrian Galicia then, now Verbivtsi, Kolomyia Raion, Ivano-Frankivsk Oblast, Ukraine), to Jewish parents and rose to theatrical prominence at the Volksbühne in Berlin. Granach entered films in 1922; among the most widely exhibited of his silent efforts was Nosferatu (1922), F.W. Murnau's loose adaptation of Dracula, in which the actor was cast as Knock, the film's counterpart to Renfield. He co-starred in such major early German talkies as Kameradschaft (1931).

The Jewish Granach fled to the Soviet Union when Adolf Hitler came to power in Germany. When the Soviet Union also proved inhospitable, he settled in Hollywood, where he made his first American film appearance as Kopalski in Ninotchka (1939) starring Greta Garbo and directed by Ernst Lubitsch, released by Metro-Goldwyn-Mayer. Granach proved indispensable to film makers during the war years, effectively portraying both dedicated Nazis (he was Julius Streicher in The Hitler Gang, 1944) and loyal anti-fascists. He portrayed Gestapo Inspector Alois Gruber in Fritz Lang's Hangmen Also Die! (1943). One of his final film appearances was in MGM's The Seventh Cross (1944), starring Spencer Tracy, in which nearly the entire cast of supporting actors were prominent European refugees.

Granach died on March 14, 1945, in New York from a pulmonary embolism following an appendectomy. He was buried in Montefiore Cemetery in Springfield Gardens, Queens. Granach's autobiography, There Goes an Actor (1945) was republished in 2010 under the new title, From the Shtetl to the Stage: The Odyssey of a Wandering Actor (Transaction Publishers). He was survived by his long time partner, Lotte Lieven, and by his son, Gad Granach. His son, who lived in Jerusalem, wrote his own memoirs with many references to his father.

== Partial filmography ==
- Das goldene Buch (1919)
- Die Liebe vom Zigeuner stammt... (1920)
- Camera Obscura (1921) – Der große Chef
- The Big Big Boss (1921) – Der große Chef
- Nosferatu (1922) – Knock
- Lucrezia Borgia (1922) – Prisoner
- Mignon (1922) – Il Gobbo
- Earth Spirit (1923) – Schigolch
- Fridericus Rex (1923) – Hans Joachim von Ziethen
- Paganini (1923) – Ferucchio
- Man by the Wayside (1923) – Shoemaker
- Schatten – Eine nächtliche Halluzination (1923) – Shadowplayer
- A Woman, an Animal, a Diamond (1923) – Archivar Lindhorst
- I.N.R.I. (1923) – Judas Ischariot
- Die Radio Heirat (1924)
- Wood Love (1925) – Waldschrat – a sprite
- Torments of the Night (1926) – Murphy
- Hoppla, wir leben! (1927)
- Svengali (1927) – Geiger Gecko
- The Famous Woman (1927) – Diener bei Alfredo
- I Once Had a Beautiful Homeland (1928) – Pollaczek, sein Bursche
- The Adjutant of the Czar (1929) – Stranger
- The Last Fort (1929) – Gestino
- Pavement Butterfly (1929) – Coco
- Flucht in die Fremdenlegion (1929) – Beppo, Legionär
- The Last Company (1930) – Haberling
- 1914 (1931) – Friend of Jaurès
- Danton (1931) – Marat
- The Theft of the Mona Lisa (1931) – Redner
- Kameradschaft (1931) – Kasper
- Gypsies (1936) – Danilo – Camp Driver
- Bortsy (1936) – Rovelli
- Ninotchka (1939) – Comrade Kopalski
- The Hunchback of Notre Dame (1939) – Soldier (uncredited)
- Foreign Correspondent (1940) – Hotel Valet (uncredited)
- So Ends Our Night (1941) – The Pole
- A Man Betrayed (1941) – T. Amato
- It Started with Eve (1941) – Popalard – Apartment Tenant (uncredited)
- Marry the Boss's Daughter (1941) – Nick (uncredited)
- Joan of Paris (1942) – Gestapo Agent
- Joan of Ozark (1942) – Guido
- Halfway to Shanghai (1942) – Mr. Nikolas
- Northwest Rangers (1942) – Pierre – Man in Casino (uncredited)
- Wrecking Crew (1942) – Joe Poska
- Hangmen Also Die! (1943) – Gestapo Insp. Alois Gruber
- Mission to Moscow (1943) – Russian Air Force Officer (uncredited)
- For Whom the Bell Tolls (1943) – Paco
- Three Russian Girls (1943) – Major Braginski
- Voice in the Wind (1944) – Angelo
- The Hitler Gang (1944) – Julius Streicher
- The Seventh Cross (1944) – Zillich
- My Buddy (1944) – Tim Oberta (final film role)

== Literature ==
- Alexander Granach: There Goes an Actor. Doubleday, Dorian and Co, Inc., Garden City 1945, ASIN B0007DSBEM
- Alexander Granach: There Goes a Mensch: A Memoir. Atara Press, Los Angeles 2019, ISBN 9780982225158
- Alexander Granach: Da geht ein Mensch. Ölbaum-Verlag, Augsburg 2003, (Neuauflage) ISBN 3-927217-38-7
- Alexander Granach: From the Shtetl to the Stage: The Odyssey of a Wandering Actor. Transaction Publishers, 2010, ISBN 978-1-4128-1347-1
- Albert Klein and Raya Kruk: Alexander Granach: fast verwehte Spuren. Edition Hentrich, Berlin 1994, ISBN 3-89468-108-X
- Alexander Granach: Mémoires d'un gardien de bordel. Anatolia, Paris 2009, ISBN 978-2-35406-040-4
- Gad Granach: Heimat los!. Ölbaum-Verlag, Augsburg 1997, ISBN 3-927217-31-X
- Gad Granach: Where Is Home? Stories from the Life of a German-Jewish Émigré. Atara Press, Los Angeles 2009, ISBN 9780982225110
