= Jean Rigaux =

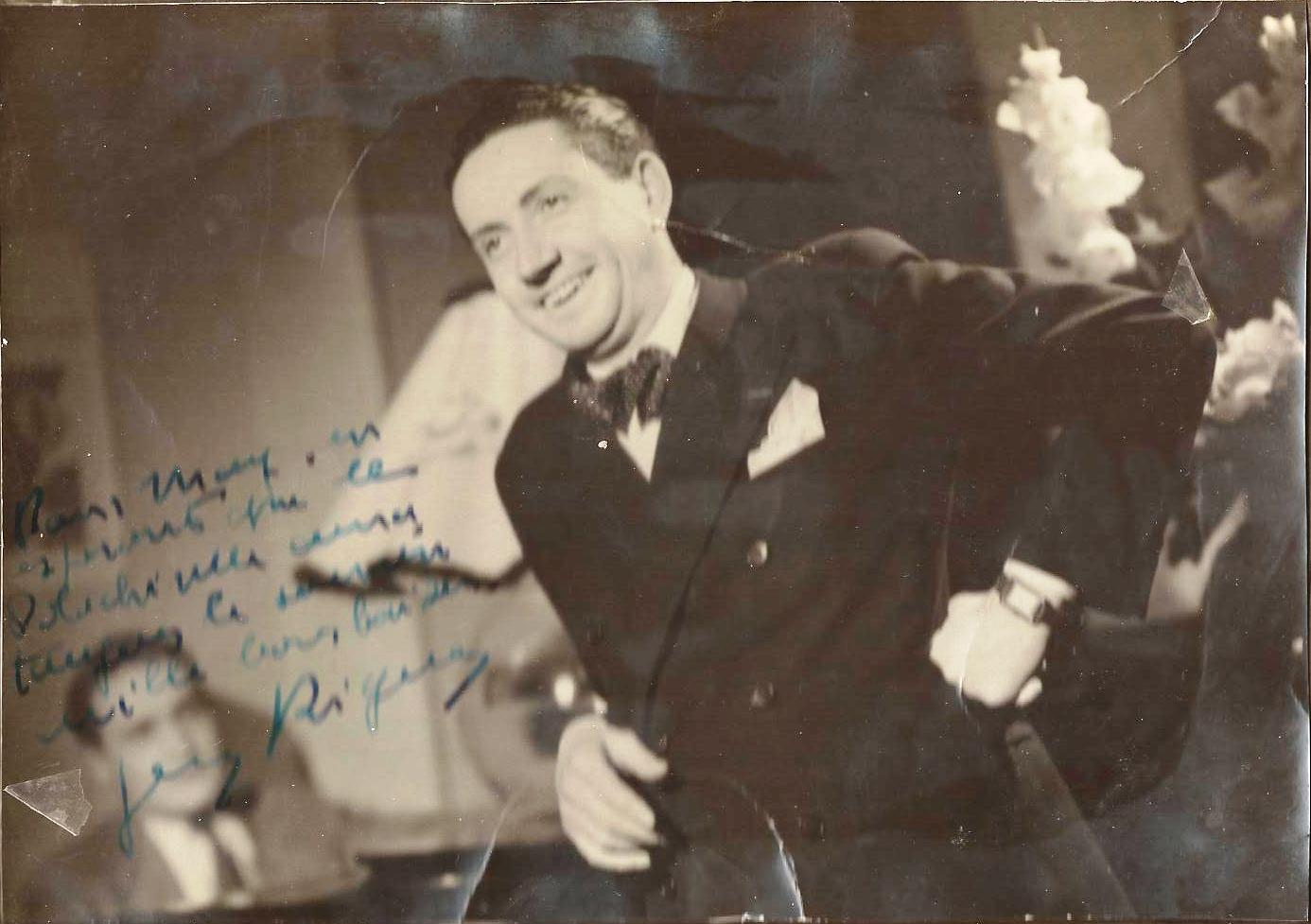
- Jean Rigaux in 1941
- Born: 10 February 1909; Paris, French Third Republic
- Died: 10 December 1991 (aged 82); Champcueil, Essonne, France
- Occupations: Songwriter, actor
- Spouse: Carmen Boni (m. 1936; died 1963)

Jean Rigaux (10 February 1909 – 10 December 1991) was a French songwriter and actor.

== Selected filmography ==
- The Lost Woman (1942)
- No Love Allowed (1942)
- Madly in Love (1943)
- Sins of Paris (1953)
- Three Make a Pair (1957)
