= The Last Fort =

1928 film

- Directed by: Curtis Bernhardt
- Written by: Curt J. Braun; Marcel Hellman; Henry Koster; Hans Wilhelm
- Produced by: Georg C. Horetsky; Seymour Nebenzal; Gustav Schwab
- Starring: Rolla Norman; Maria Paudler; Albert Steinrück; Fritz Odemar
- Cinematography: Artur von Schwertführer; Fritz Arno Wagner
- Production company: Nero Film
- Release date: 1928
- Running time: 90 minutes
- Country: Germany
- Languages: Silent; German intertitles

The Last Fort (German: Das letzte Fort) is a 1928 German silent war film directed by Curtis Bernhardt and starring Rolla Norman, Maria Paudler and Albert Steinrück.

== Cast ==
- Rolla Norman as Major Leblanc
- Maria Paudler as Yvonne, seine Tochter
- Albert Steinrück as Lensky, Kommandant
- Fritz Odemar as Lieutenant Brand
- Heinrich George as Croff
- Alexander Granach as Gestino
- Alfred Gördel as Capitän Andrieux

== Bibliography ==
- Koepnick, Lutz Peter. The Dark Mirror: German Cinema Between Hitler and Hollywood. University of California Press, 2002.
- Prawer, S.S. Between Two Worlds: The Jewish Presence in German and Austrian Film, 1910–1933. Berghahn Books, 2005.
