= Hans Erdmann =

German composer (1882–1942)

- Born: 7 November 1882; Breslau, German Empire
- Died: 21 November 1942 (aged 60); Berlin, Nazi Germany
- Occupation: Composer
- Years active: 1922 – 1936

Hans Erdmann (7 November 1882 – 21 November 1942) was a German composer. He produced several film scores for German films.

== Selected filmography ==
- Nosferatu (1922)
- Le testament du Dr. Mabuse/The Testament of Dr. Mabuse (1933)
- Augustus the Strong (1936)

== Bibliography ==
- Kester, Bernadette. Representations of the First World War in German Films of the Weimar Period (1919-1933). Amersterdam University Press, 2003.
