= Princess Olala =

1928 film

- Directed by: Robert Land
- Written by: Jean Gilbert (operetta); Rudolf Bernauer (operetta); Rudolph Schanzer (operetta); Franz Schulz
- Produced by: Julius Haimann
- Starring: Carmen Boni; Walter Rilla; Marlene Dietrich; Hans Albers
- Cinematography: Willy Goldberger
- Production company: Super-Film
- Distributed by: Deutsche Lichtspiel-Syndikat
- Release date: 5 September 1928
- Running time: 116 minutes
- Country: Germany
- Languages: Silent; German intertitles

Princess Olala (German: Prinzessin Olala) is a 1928 German silent drama film directed by Robert Land and starring Carmen Boni, Walter Rilla, Marlene Dietrich and Hans Albers. It is also known by the alternative title of Art of Love. It was made at the Tempelhof Studios in Berlin. The film's sets were designed by the art director Robert Neppach.

== Cast ==
- Hermann Böttcher as Der Fürst
- Walter Rilla as Prince Boris, his son
- Georg Alexander as Der Kammerherr
- Carmen Boni as Prinzessin Xenia
- Illa Meery as Hedy, her friend
- Marlene Dietrich as Chichotte de Gastoné
- Hans Albers as René Chichotte's friend
- Gyula Szőreghy as a strong man
- Lya Christy as Lady Jackson
- Aribert Wäscher as Police superintendent
- Carl Goetz as an old cavalier
- Alfred Abel in an undefined role

== Bibliography ==
- Wood, Ean. Divine Dietrich: Venus in Tails. Sanctuary, 2002.
