= M (1931 film) =

1931 film by Fritz Lang

- Theatrical release poster
- Directed by: Fritz Lang
- Written by: Fritz Lang; Thea von Harbou
- Produced by: Seymour Nebenzal
- Starring: Peter Lorre; Otto Wernicke; Gustaf Gründgens
- Cinematography: Fritz Arno Wagner
- Edited by: Paul Falkenberg
- Production company: Nero-Film A.G.
- Distributed by: Vereinigte Star-Film GmbH
- Release date: 11 May 1931
- Running time: 111 minutes
- Country: Germany
- Language: German

M is a 1931 German mystery thriller film directed by Fritz Lang and starring Peter Lorre as Hans Beckert, a serial killer who targets children, in his third screen role. Both Lang's first sound film and an early example of a procedural drama, M centres on the efforts of both a city's police force and its criminal syndicates to apprehend a serial child-murderer.

The film's screenplay was written by Lang and his wife Thea von Harbou. It features many cinematic innovations, including the use of long tracking shots and a musical leitmotif in the form of "In the Hall of the Mountain King", which is repeatedly whistled by Lorre's character. Lang regarded the film as his magnum opus, and it is widely considered one of the greatest films of all time and an indispensable influence on modern crime and thriller fiction.

An American remake under the same title, directed by Joseph Losey, was released in 1951. As a published work from 1931, M will enter the American public domain on January 1, 2027.

== Plot ==
In Berlin, a group of children are playing an elimination game in the courtyard of an apartment building using a macabre chant about a child-killer. Frau Beckmann sets the table for lunch, waiting for her daughter Elsie to come home from school. A wanted poster warns of a serial killer preying on children, as anxious parents wait outside a school.

Elsie leaves school, bouncing a ball on her way home. She is approached by Hans Beckert, who is whistling "In the Hall of the Mountain King" by Edvard Grieg. He offers to buy her a balloon from a blind street vendor, and walks and talks with her. Elsie's place at the table remains empty, her ball rolls away through a patch of grass, and her balloon gets briefly caught in the telephone lines overhead before blowing away in the wind.

In the wake of Elsie's disappearance, anxiety runs high among the public. Beckert sends an anonymous letter to the newspapers taking responsibility for the child murders and promising that he will commit others. The police extract clues from the letter using the new techniques of fingerprinting and handwriting analysis. Under mounting pressure from the government, the police work around the clock. Inspector Karl Lohmann, head of the homicide squad, instructs his men to intensify their search and to check the records of recently released psychiatric patients, focusing on any with a history of violence against children.

They stage frequent raids in seedier parts of the city to question known criminals, disrupting organized crime so badly that Der Schränker ("The Safecracker") summons the bosses of Berlin's Ringvereine to a conference to address the situation. They decide to organize their own manhunt, assigning beggars to watch the children. The police search Beckert's rented room, find evidence there connecting him to both the letter and a past crime scene, and lie in wait to arrest him.

Beckert sees a young girl in the reflection of a shop window and begins to follow her, but stops when the girl meets her mother. He encounters another girl and befriends her, but the blind balloon vendor recognizes his whistling. The vendor alerts one of his friends, who follows Beckert and sees him inside a shop with the girl. As the two exit onto the street, the man chalks the letter "M" (for Mörder, "murderer") onto his palm, pretends to trip, and bumps into Beckert, marking the back of his overcoat with the letter. The girl eventually notices the chalk and offers to clean it for him, but before she finishes, Beckert realizes he is being watched and flees without her.

Attempting to evade the beggars, Beckert hides inside a large office building just before the workers leave for the evening. The beggars call Der Schränker, who arrives at the building with a team of other criminals. They capture and torture one of the watchmen for information and, after capturing the other two, search the building and catch Beckert in the attic. When one of the watchmen trips the silent alarm, the criminals narrowly escape with their prisoner before the police arrive. Franz, one of the criminals, is left behind in the confusion and captured by the police. By falsely claiming that one of the watchmen was killed during the break-in, Lohmann tricks Franz into admitting that the gang's only motive was to find Beckert and revealing their plans for him.

The criminals take Beckert to an abandoned distillery to face a kangaroo court. He finds a large, silent crowd awaiting him. Beckert is given a "lawyer" who gamely argues in his defense but fails to win any sympathy from the improvised jury. Beckert delivers an impassioned monologue, saying that he cannot control his homicidal urges, while the other criminals present break the law by choice. He questions why they believe they have any right to judge him:

What right have you to speak? Criminals! Perhaps you are even proud of yourselves! Proud of being able to crack into safes, or climb into buildings or cheat at cards. All of which, it seems to me, you could just as easily give up, if you had learned something useful, or if you had jobs, or if you were not such lazy pigs. I can not help myself! I have no control over this evil thing that is inside me—the fire, the voices, the torment!

Beckert pleads to be handed over to the police. His "lawyer" points out that Der Schränker, presiding over the proceedings, is wanted on three counts of manslaughter, and that it is unjust to execute an insane man. Just as the mob is about to kill Beckert, the police arrive to arrest both him and the criminals.

As a panel of judges prepares to deliver their verdict at Beckert's trial, the mothers of three of his victims weep in the gallery. Frau Beckmann says that "no sentence will bring the dead children back" and "one has to keep closer watch over the children". The screen fades to black as she adds, "All of you".

== Cast ==
- Peter Lorre as Hans Beckert. M was Lorre's first major starring role and boosted his career, though he was typecast as a villain for years afterward in films such as Mad Love and Crime and Punishment. Before M, Lorre had been mostly a comedic actor. After fleeing the Nazis, he landed a role in Alfred Hitchcock's The Man Who Knew Too Much (1934), learning his lines phonetically in order to improve his English.
- Otto Wernicke as Inspector Karl Lohmann. Wernicke made his breakthrough with M after playing many small roles in silent films for over a decade. After his part in M he was in great demand due to the success of the film, including returning to the role of Lohmann in Lang's The Testament of Dr. Mabuse, and he played supporting roles for the rest of his career.
- Gustaf Gründgens as Der Schränker ("The Safecracker"). Gründgens received acclaim for his role in the film and established a successful career for himself during the Nazi era, ultimately becoming director of the Staatliches Schauspielhaus (National Dramatic Theatre).
- Ellen Widmann as Mrs. Beckmann
- Inge Landgut as Elsie Beckmann
- Theodor Loos as Inspector Groeber
- Friedrich Gnaß as Franz, the burglar
- Fritz Odemar as Falschspieler (cheater)
- Paul Kemp as Taschendieb (pickpocket with seven watches)
- Theo Lingen as Bauernfänger (con man)
- Rudolf Blümner as Beckert's defender
- Georg John as blind balloon-seller
- Franz Stein as minister
- Ernst Stahl-Nachbaur as police chief
- Gerhard Bienert as criminal secretary
- Karl Platen as Damowitz, a night-watchman
- Rosa Valetti as innkeeper
- Hertha von Walther as prostitute
- Heinrich Gotho as passer-by who tells a kid the time

Uncredited

- Hanna Maron as girl in circle at the beginning
- Klaus Pohl as witness / one-eyed man (uncredited)

== Inspiration ==
M has been said, by various critics and reviewers, to be based on serial killer Peter Kürten—the "Vampire of Düsseldorf"—whose crimes took place in the 1920s. Lang denied that he drew from this case in an interview in 1963 with film historian Gero Gandert: "At the time I decided to use the subject matter of M, there were many serial killers terrorizing Germany—Haarmann, Großmann, Kürten, Denke, [...]".

Inspector Karl Lohmann is based on Ernst Gennat, then director of the Berlin criminal police.

Lang's depiction of the Berlin underworld in the film was inspired by the real Ringvereine (lit. "Ring clubs"). The film's portrayal of the Ringvereine as organized with a board of directors that were dominated by a charismatic master criminal was based on reality. Likewise, the practice of the Ringvereine shown in the film of providing financial support for the families of imprisoned members was also based on reality. The break-in of an office building depicted in the film was inspired by the real-life 1929 break-in of the Disconto Bank in Berlin by the Sass brothers gang, though unlike in the film the objective was larceny, not to capture a serial killer.

The Ringvereine, which were officially wrestling associations that existed for the physical betterment of German men, always sought to promote a very 'respectable', almost middle-class image of themselves. Like the Mafia, the Ringvereine paradoxically portrayed themselves as the guardians of society's values, who upheld a certain social order. The image the Ringvereine sought to project was as "professionals" whose crimes did not harm ordinary people.

Though the Ringvereine were known to be gangsters, their hierarchal structure and strict discipline led to a certain popular admiration for them as a force for social order unlike the psychopathic serial killers who murdered random strangers for reasons that often seemed unfathomable, sparking widespread fear and dread. In an article originally published in Die Filmwoche, Lang wrote that the crime scene in Germany was "such compelling cinematic material that I lived in constant fear that someone else would exploit this idea before me".

== Production ==
Lang placed an advertisement in a newspaper in 1930 stating that his next film would be Mörder unter uns (Murderer Among Us) and that it was about a child murderer. He immediately began receiving threatening letters in the mail and was also denied a studio space to shoot the film at the Staaken Studios. When Lang confronted the head of Staaken Studio to find out why he was being denied access, the studio head informed Lang that he was a member of the Nazi Party and that the party suspected that the film was meant to depict the Nazis. This assumption was based entirely on the film's original title and the Nazi Party relented when told the plot.

M was eventually shot in six weeks at a Staaken Zeppelinhalle studio, just outside Berlin. Lang made the film for Nero-Film, rather than with UFA or his own production company. It was produced by Nero studio head Seymour Nebenzal who later produced Lang's The Testament of Dr. Mabuse. Working titles for the film included Eine Stadt sucht einen Mörder (A City Searches for a Murderer) and Dein Mörder sieht Dich an (Your Murderer Looks at You).

While researching for the film, Lang spent eight days inside a mental institution in Germany and met several child murderers, including Peter Kürten. He used several real criminals as extras in the film and eventually 25 cast members were arrested during the film's shooting. Peter Lorre was cast in the lead role of Hans Beckert, acting for the film during the day and appearing on stage in Valentin Kataev's Squaring the Circle at night.

Lang did not show any acts of violence or deaths of children on screen and later said that by only suggesting violence, he forced "each individual member of the audience to create the gruesome details of the murder according to their personal imagination".

Peter Lorre as Hans Beckert, gazing into a shop window. Lang used glass and reflections throughout the film for expressive purposes.

=== Use of sound ===
M was Lang's first sound film, and he experimented with the new technology. It has a dense and complex soundtrack, as opposed to the more theatrical "talkies" being released at the time. The soundtrack includes sounds occurring off-camera, sounds motivating action and suspenseful moments of silence before sudden noise. Lang was also able to make fewer cuts in the film's editing, since sound effects could now be used to inform the narrative.

The film was one of the first to use a leitmotif, a technique borrowed from opera. It associates a melody with Lorre's character, who whistles "In the Hall of the Mountain King" from Edvard Grieg's Peer Gynt. Later in the film, the mere sound of the song lets the audience know that he is nearby. This association of a musical theme with a particular character or situation is now a film staple. As Lorre could not whistle, Lang dubbed Beckert's whistling.

== Release ==
M premiered on 11 May 1931 at the Ufa-Palast am Zoo in Berlin, in a version lasting 117 minutes. The original negative is preserved at the Federal Film Archive in a 96-minute version. In 1960, an edited 98-minute version was released. The film was restored in 2000 by the Netherlands Film Museum in collaboration with the Federal Film Archive, the Cinemateque Suisse, Kirsch Media and ZDF/ARTE., with Janus Films releasing the 109-minute version as part of its Criterion Collection using prints from the Cinemateque Suisse and the Netherlands Film Museum. A complete print of the English version and selected scenes from the French version were included in the 2010 Criterion Collection release of the film.

The film was released in the United States in April 1933 by Foremco Pictures. After playing in German with English subtitles for two weeks, it was pulled from theaters and replaced by an English-language version. The re-dubbing was directed by Eric Hakim, and Lorre was one of the few cast members to reprise his role in the film.

As with many other early talkies from the years 1930–1931, M was partially reshot with actors (including Lorre) performing dialogue in other languages for foreign markets after the German original was completed, apparently without Lang's involvement. An English-language version was filmed and released in 1932 from an edited script with Lorre speaking his own words, his first English part. An edited French version was also released but despite the fact that Lorre spoke French his speaking parts were dubbed.

In 2013, a DCP version was released by Kino Lorber and played theatrically in North America in the original aspect ratio of 1.19:1. Critic Kenneth Turan of the Los Angeles Times called this the "most-complete-ever version" at 111 minutes. The film was restored by TLEFilms Film Restoration & Preservation Services (Berlin) in association with Archives françaises du film – CNC (Paris) and PostFactory GmbH (Berlin).

== Critical reception ==
=== Initial response ===
A Variety review said that the film was "a little too long. Without spoiling the effect—even bettering it—cutting could be done. There are a few repetitions and a few slow scenes." Graham Greene compared the film to "looking through the eye-piece of a microscope, through which the tangled mind is exposed, laid flat on the slide: love and lust; nobility and perversity, hatred of itself and despair jumping at you from the jelly".

=== Reassessment ===
In later years, the film received widespread critical praise. On the review aggregator website Rotten Tomatoes, 100% of 63 critics' reviews are positive, with an average rating of 9.80/10. The site's critics consensus reads: "A landmark psychological thriller with arresting images, deep thoughts on modern society, and Peter Lorre in his finest performance."

Marc Savlov of Austin Chronicle awarded the film five out of five stars, calling it, "One of the greatest of all German Expressionistic films". Savlov praised the film's cinematography, the use of sound and Lorre's performance. In 1997, critic Roger Ebert added M to his "Great Movies" list. He proposed Lang's limited use of dialogue was a critical factor in the film's success, in contrast with many early sound films which "felt they had to talk all the time". Ebert also argued the film's characters, nearly all grotesques, embodied Lang's distaste for his adopted homeland: "What I sense is that Lang hated the people around him, hated Nazism, and hated Germany for permitting it."

In 2015, Taste of Cinema ranked the film 18th among the "30 Great Psychopath Movies That Are Worth Your Time", and in 2024 Paste ranked the character of Beckert 1st among "the best portrayals of cinematic sociopaths".

== Themes ==
The Weimar Republic was marked by intense debates about the morality and efficiency of capital punishment, with the political left arguing that the death penalty was barbaric while the right-wing argued that the death penalty was needed to maintain law and order. Adding to the debate was popular interest in the new science of psychiatry, with many psychiatrists arguing that crime was caused by damaged minds and emotions which could be cured. In the background was a popular obsessive fear of crime and social breakdown, which was fed by sensationalist newspaper coverage of crime.

In addition, for many conservative Germans, the Weimar republic was itself born of crime, namely the November Revolution of 1918 which began with the High Seas Fleet mutiny. According to this viewpoint, its origins in mutiny and revolution made the Weimar Republic an illegitimate state that could not maintain social order. Lang followed these debates closely and incorporated them into several of his Weimar-era films. The debate at Beckert's "trial" about whether he deserved to be killed or not paralleled the contemporary debates about capital punishment in Germany.

The fact that Der Schränker, a career criminal, serves as both the prosecutor and judge at the kangaroo court, egging on the mob of criminals to kill Beckert, seems to suggest that Lang's sympathy was with the abolitionists. The arguments that Der Schränker makes at the kangaroo court, namely that certain people are so evil that they deserved to be killed for the good of society, was precisely the same argument made by supporters of the death penalty.

== Legacy ==
Lang considered M to be his favorite of his own films because of the social criticism in the film. In 1937, he told a reporter that he made the film "to warn mothers about neglecting children". The film has appeared on multiple lists as one of the greatest films ever made. It was voted the best German film of all time with 306 votes in a 1994 poll of 324 film journalists, film critics, filmmakers, and cineastes organized by the Association of German Cinémathèques. It is included in Empire's 100 Best Films of World Cinema in 2010 and the film reference book 1001 Movies You Must See Before You Die.

In 2018, it was voted the thirteenth greatest foreign-language film of all time in BBC's poll of 209 critics in 43 countries. The film is also referenced in the song "In Germany Before the War" by American songwriter Randy Newman in his 1977 album Little Criminals.

A scene from the movie was used in the 1940 Nazi propaganda movie The Eternal Jew.

=== Remakes and adaptations ===
A Hollywood remake of the same title was released in 1951, shifting the action from Berlin to Los Angeles. Nero Films head Seymour Nebenzal and his son Harold produced the film for Columbia Pictures. Lang had once told a reporter: "People ask me why I do not remake M in English. I have no reason to do that. I said all I had to say about that subject in the picture. Now, I have other things to say." The remake was directed by Joseph Losey and starred David Wayne in Lorre's role. Losey stated that he had seen M in the early 1930s and watched it again shortly before shooting the remake, but that he "never referred to it. I only consciously repeated one shot. There may have been unconscious repetitions in terms of the atmosphere, of certain sequences." Lang later said that when the remake was released, he "had the best reviews of [his] life".

Argentine film noir The Black Vampire, released in 1953 and directed by Román Viñoly Barreto, is based on Lang's original script.

In 2003, M was adapted for radio by Peter Straughan and broadcast on BBC Radio 3 on 2 February, later re-broadcast on BBC Radio 4 Extra on 8 October 2016. Directed by Toby Swift, this drama won the Prix Italia for Adapted Drama in 2004.

Writer Jon J. Muth adapted the screenplay into a four-part comic book series in 1990, which was reissued as a graphic novel in 2008.

In 2015, Joseph D. Kucan adapted the screenplay into a theatrical stageplay entitled A Summons from the Tinker to Assemble the Membership in Secret at the Usual Place for the Las Vegas-based theatre company A Public Fit.

In 2019, a six-episode Austrian-German miniseries adaptation of the film was released, entitled M — A City Hunts a Murderer.

== Home media ==
The Criterion Collection released the film on DVD on October 20, 1998, and they upgraded it to Blu-ray on May 11, 2010. On February 22, 2010, Eureka Video released the film under their Masters of Cinema series.

== See also ==
- Trial film
- List of cult films
- List of films featuring surveillance
- List of films with a 100% rating on Rotten Tomatoes
- List of films considered the best
- List of films featuring psychopaths and sociopaths

== Bibliography ==
- Kaes, Anton; Dimendberg, Edward; Jay, Martin (1994). The Weimar Republic Sourcebook. Los Angeles: University of California Press. ISBN 9780520067752.
- Lee, Daryl (2014). The Heist Film Stealing with Style. New York: Wallflower. ISBN 9780231169691.
- Lessing, Theodor (1993) [1925]. Monsters of Weimar: Haarmann, the Story of a Werewolf. London: Nemesis Books. pp. 293–306. ISBN 1897743106.
- Schneider, Steven Jay, ed. (2015). 1001 Movies You Must See before You Die. Cassel. ISBN 9781844038794.
- Schulte-Bockholt, Schulte-Bockholt (2006). The Politics of Organized Crime and the Organized Crime of Politics A Study in Criminal Power. Latham: Lexington Books. ISBN 9780739113585.
- Thomas, Sarah (2012). Peter Lorre, Face Maker: Stardom and Performance Between Hollywood and Europe. United States: Berghahn Books. ISBN 9780857454423.
