= Venus in Evening Wear =

1927 film

- Directed by: Robert Land
- Written by: Thilde Förster; Erich Nossen; Ladislaus Vajda
- Produced by: Günther Stapenhorst; Arthur Ziehm
- Starring: Carmen Boni; Georg Alexander; Henri De Vries
- Cinematography: Edgar S. Ziesemer
- Music by: Walter Ulfig
- Production company: International Film-Exchange
- Distributed by: International Film-Exchange
- Release date: 13 April 1927
- Country: Germany
- Languages: Silent; German intertitles

Venus in Evening Wear (German: Venus im Frack) is a 1927 German silent film directed by Robert Land and starring Carmen Boni, Georg Alexander and Henri De Vries.

The art direction was by Oscar Friedrich Werndorff and Erich Zander.

== Cast ==
- Carmen Boni

and in alphabetical order

- Georg Alexander
- Henri De Vries
- Karl Elzer
- Evi Eva
- Max Hansen
- Karl Harbacher
- Valerie Jones
- Paul Morgan
- Hermann Picha
- Albert Steinrück
- Robert Thiem]
- Borwin Walth
- Ida Wüst
- Wolfgang Zilzer

== Bibliography ==
- Grange, William. Cultural Chronicle of the Weimar Republic. Scarecrow Press, 2008.
