= Whistle Stop (1946 film) =

1946 film by Léonide Moguy

- Theatrical release poster
- Directed by: Léonide Moguy
- Screenplay by: Philip Yordan
- Based on: Whistle Stop; 1941 novel by Maritta M. Wolff
- Produced by: Seymour Nebenzal
- Starring: George Raft; Ava Gardner; Victor McLaglen; Tom Conway
- Cinematography: Russell Metty
- Edited by: Gregg C. Tallas
- Music by: Dimitri Tiomkin
- Color process: Black and white
- Production company: Nero Films
- Distributed by: United Artists
- Release date: January 25, 1946 (United States)
- Running time: 85 minutes
- Country: United States
- Language: English

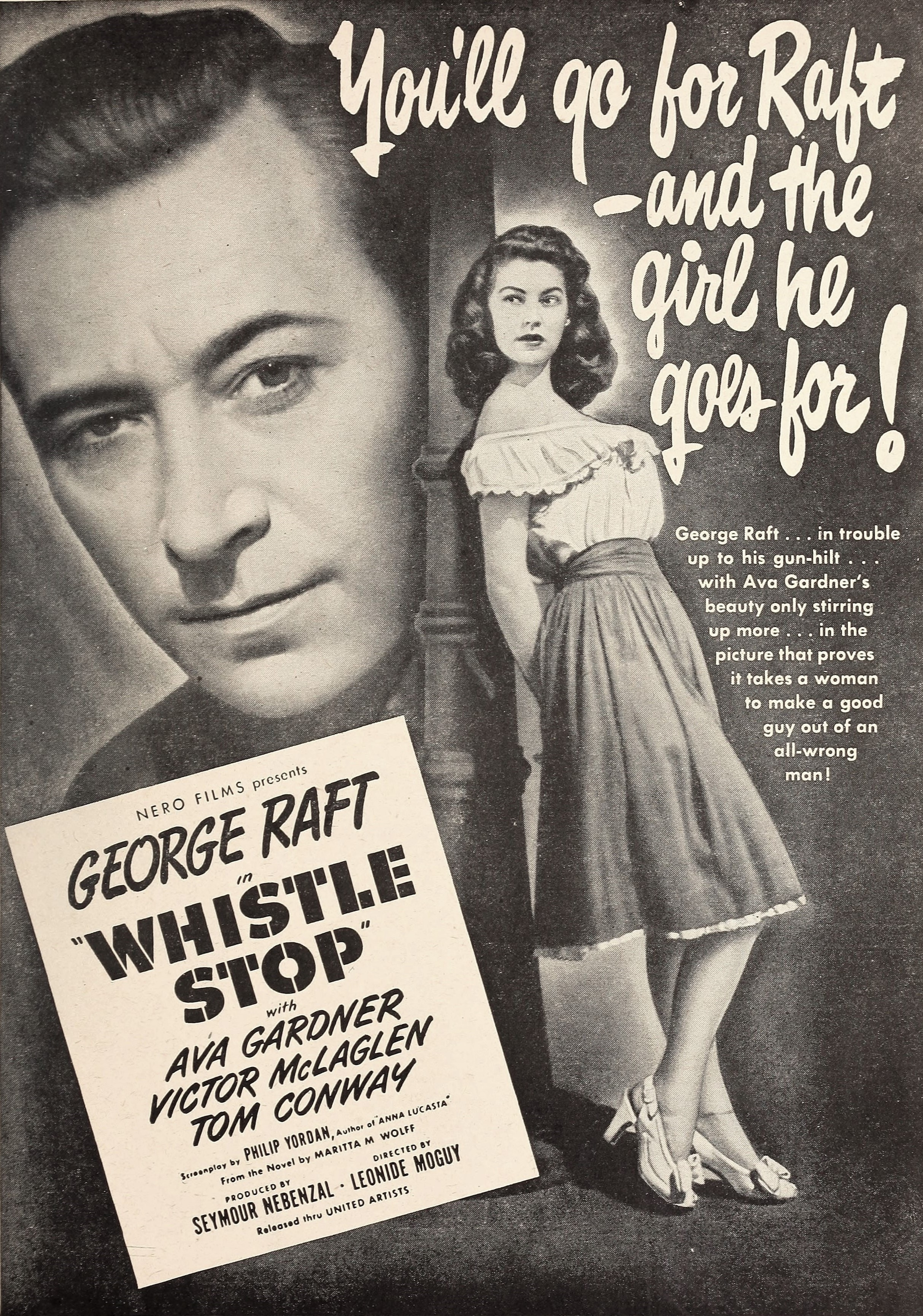
Lobby card for the film

Whistle Stop is a 1946 American film noir crime film directed by Léonide Moguy and starring George Raft, Ava Gardner, Victor McLaglen, and Tom Conway. It was produced by Seymour Nebenzal's Nero Films and distributed by United Artists. The screenplay was written by Philip Yordan, based on a 1941 novel of the title by Maritta M. Wolff.

== Plot ==
Away for two years, a woman named Mary (Ava Gardner) returns to her home in a small town (a 'whistle stop'). She attempts to reconcile with Kenny Veech (George Raft), her former romantic interest, but he is jealous and bitter, particularly after she takes up with Veech's mortal enemy, nightclub owner Lew Lentz (Tom Conway).

Gitlo (Victor McLaglen), a friend of Kenny's who works for Lentz, talks Kenny into a scheme to rob and kill Lentz at a train station as he leaves for Detroit, then hide his corpse to make Mary believe he chose not to return. Mary manages to foil Veech's plans, but she remains torn between the two men.

Seeking vengeance, Lentz tries to pin a murder on Veech and Gitlo, who barely make a getaway. Gitlo and Lentz end up killing one another, and Mary finds Veech recovering from a gunshot wound to the arm he had suffered while making his and Gitlo's escape. The movie ends with them arm-in-arm, walking away to live happily ever after.

== Cast ==
- George Raft as Kenny Veech
- Ava Gardner as Mary
- Victor McLaglen as Gitlo
- Tom Conway as Lew Lentz
- Jorja Curtright as Fran
- Jane Nigh as Josie Veech
- Florence Bates as Molly Veech
- Charles Drake as Ernie
- Charles Judels as Sam Veech
- Carmel Myers as Estelle
- Jimmy Conlin as Al - the Barber
- Jimmy Ames as Mr. Barker
- Mack Gray as Bartender
- Robert Homans as Sheriff

== Production ==
=== Original novel ===
The film was based on the debut novel by 23 year old Maritta Wolff who wrote it in her senior year at the University of Michigan.

Philip Yordan bought the film rights in November 1944 and wrote a screenplay. He said the rights were only $7,500 and the deal was negotiated by Charles Feldman.

Yordan later said "I used a small portion of the actual book and developed the story from there" because he said the book was too explicit sexually. Among the changes made to the plot of the novel was the removal of an incestuous relationship between a brother and sister.

=== Development ===
In February 1945 Yordan sold the project to producer Seymour Nebenzal. Yordan remained associate producer in exchange for 50% of the profits. He was paid $2,000 a week.

The film was financed by a bank in Palm Springs. Yordan says this was Security Pacific who put up 60% of the budget.

=== Casting ===
Ava Gardner was borrowed from MGM for $5,000. Yordan said "her voice was poor, thin; she was woefully miscast." Tom Conway was borrowed from RKO.

Yordan said "my script was very good" but felt the producer made a mistake casting Raft. "He had been a big name around the world and he was on the skids and we could afford him, but he looked like hell and who wanted to see this old man with Ava Gardner? It should have been a young guy like Burt Lancaster."

=== Shooting ===
Filming started June 29, 1945. Gardner wrote that the director "was a dear man I liked very much." She said everyone on the film including her "rated it as a piece of rubbish" but she enjoyed making it because George Raft "was such fun."

Yordan said he had to constantly rewrite the dialogue so Raft and Gardner could say it.

According to Gardner, Raft constantly tried to seduce his co-star; she refused but greatly enjoyed his company "and he made Whistle Stop worthwhile."

== Reception ==
=== Box office ===
The film was a box office hit. It was one of a series of popular movies Raft made as a freelancer following leaving Warner Bros. Gardner said the film "was my first leading role and as such did finally get me noticed."

=== Critical response ===
When the film was released, film critic Bosley Crowther, dismissed it, writing, "A slice of sordid life in a small mid-Western town was somewhat faithfully reflected in Maritta Wolff's novel, Whistle Stop, but the same can't be said for the picture, based upon it, which came to the Globe on Saturday. This plainly remote and artificial concoction lacks flavor, consistency, reason and even dramatic suspense. And it is also abominably acted—which covers about everything ... The film was directed by Leonide Moguy, late of France. Don't ask us why."

Variety, however, was more positive in their review. The staff wrote, "Heavy melodrama, adapted from the Maritta M. Wolff novel of same title, is somber melodrama, vignetting a seamy side of life in a small town. Production and playing are excellent and the direction strong, although latter is given to occasional arty tone ... Gardner displays her best work to date as the girl who must have her man. McLaglen hits top form as the not too bright bartender, and Conway is smooth as the heavy. Score is an aid in projecting the somber mood."

== In popular culture ==
In 2000, Bay-Tek Incorporated released an arcade skill-game under the name "Whistle Stop". In a 2015 interview with Noah Simmons, the artist who worked on the designs for the game, it was revealed that a main inspiration for the theme of the game was the "...elements of noir genre found in the 1946 film 'Whistle Stop' ... but most influential to the development was the train-station scene." The game borrows multiple sound effects from the film.
