= Jorja Curtright =

American actress and interior designer

- Born: August 14, 1923; Amarillo, Texas, U.S.
- Died: May 11, 1985 (aged 61); Los Angeles, California, U.S.
- Occupations: Actress and interior designer
- Spouse: Sidney Sheldon (m. 1952)
- Children: 1

Jorja Curtright, also known after marriage as Jorja Sheldon (August 14, 1923 – May 11, 1985) was an American stage and film actress, who later became an interior designer.

== Life ==
Jorja Curtright was born August 14, 1923 in Amarillo, Texas. In her first film, the wartime propaganda film Hitler's Madman (1943), she played a young woman, Clara Janek, who leaps to her death from a hospital window rather than submit to Nazi sterilization.

In 1952, she married the novelist and producer Sidney Sheldon, and the pair had a daughter, Mary. She and Sheldon were good friends of Groucho Marx, who thought highly of her ability as an actress. In later life Jorja Sheldon became an interior designer. By the time of her death she had decorated over 200 homes for friends and celebrities across the United States. She also edited her husband's novels.

Jorja Curtright died on May 11, 1985 from a heart attack, at Cedars Sinai Medical Center in Los Angeles. She was 61 years old.

== Filmography ==
- Hitler's Madman (1943).
- Whistle Stop (1946).
- Heaven Only Knows (1947).
- M (1951).
- Dangerous Assignment (1951). S1E11
- Love Is a Many-Splendored Thing (1955).
- The Revolt of Mamie Stover (1956).
- Bonanza (1966) S7E27
- I Dream of Jeannie (1966) S1E25

Gunsmoke (1956) S1E36 as Cara
