= The Adjutant of the Czar =

1929 film

- Directed by: Vladimir Strizhevsky
- Written by: Vladimir Strizhevsky
- Produced by: Herman Millakowsky; Georg Witt
- Starring: Mozzhukhin; Carmen Boni; Fritz Alberti
- Cinematography: Nikolai Toporkoff
- Production company: Greenbaum Film
- Distributed by: Aafa-Film
- Release date: 12 February 1929
- Running time: 110 minutes
- Country: Germany
- Language: German

The Adjutant of the Czar (German: Der Adjutant des Zaren) is a 1929 German drama film directed by Vladimir Strizhevsky and starring Ivan Mozzhukhin, Carmen Boni and Fritz Alberti. It is set in Tsarist Russia.

The film's sets were designed by the art directors Otto Erdmann and Hans Sohnle.

== Plot ==
The Adjutant of the Czar takes place before the outbreak of World War I. After his ex-fiancée cancelled their engagement, Prince Kurbski, Adjutant of the Czar, returns to Russia on the train from Paris to Petersburg. On the train, he makes the acquaintance of Helena di Armore, a young Italian lady. On the German-Russian border, her handbag, containing her ticket and passport, is stolen by a pickpocket.

Since Kurbski was planning to return with his newly betrothed wife, he has paperwork indicating that he is travelling with spouse and offers her to travel with him to Petersburg, pretending that they are married. He warns her that they risk heavy punishment if this comes out but as she is urgently expected in Petersburg, she agrees anyway.

Once the charade is underway, they bump into General Koloboff, a superior and old friend of Kurbski who is also travelling on the train and is excited to meet the "newlyweds". As a surprise he also telegraphs ahead to arrange a committee of fellow soldiers to welcome them at Petersburg train station and celebrate the marriage. When they arrive, they need to keep playing the happy couple and the situation spirals further out of control when the Czar himself insists to meet Kurbski's new wife. As he has developed feelings for her by now, Kurbski suggests to Helena to marry for real and after some hesitation she agrees, as she also likes him, so they secretly get properly married.

One evening soon after, Kurbski returns from his duties at the Winter Palace earlier than usual and observes his wife leaving their house in a carriage with another man (which is actually the same person who “stole” her handbag at the German border). He secretly follows them to a meeting of an underground organisation where the other members praise her for managing to achieve their plans so far. She pleads that she does not want to continue with the plan but the other participants pay no attention and insist that a certain plan must be carried out on the following Sunday, which is the day when Helena is supposed to be introduced to the Czar at a ballet performance.

Back at their house, Kurbski confronts Helena with what he found out and she tearfully insists that her love to him is genuine. He takes her to see the chief of police where he does not betray her but requests a passport for her to leave the country and tells her she should never come back. Kurbski tells the chief that Helena needs to leave the country urgently on a family matter.

On the train, Helena meets the leader of her organisation who threatens to kill Kurbski if she does not return to the event where she was supposed to meet the Czar. To save Kurbsky, she agrees. At the ballet, Kurbski meets her again. She tells him that they threatened to murder him if she would not attend. Moved by this confession, he promises her to protect her and leads her out on the street. On their way out, they are spotted by the chief of police who gets suspicious as Helena is supposed to be out of the country. Outside in the carriage, Helena notices that she lost her handbag inside and Kurbski returns to the building to retrieve it. But the bag was already spotted by the chief of police who finds a small pistol inside.

When Kurbski returns outside, Helena and her carriage are gone. He returns to his house where he is arrested by the chief of police. Soon after that, he learns from his servant that Helena was abducted by her secret organisation. He persuades the chief of police to let him try to find her under the condition that the chief of police will accompany him. They chase the carriage with the plotters to the Finish border and most of the conspirators are shot during the chase. When they find Helena, the chief of police turns a blind eye to Korbski accompanying Helena to the Finish border. She asks him to leave together with her but he insists that she must leave the country and he will return to fulfil his service obligations. She says that she will wait for him forever.

== Cast ==
- Ivan Mozzhukhin as Prince Boris Kurbski
- Carmen Boni as Helena di Armore
- Eugen Burg as Baron Korff
- George Seroff as General Koloboff
- Fritz Alberti as General Trunoff
- Daniel Dolski as Prince's manservant
- Alexander Polonsky as Servant
- Alexander Granach as Stranger
