= Annie Vernay =

Swiss actress

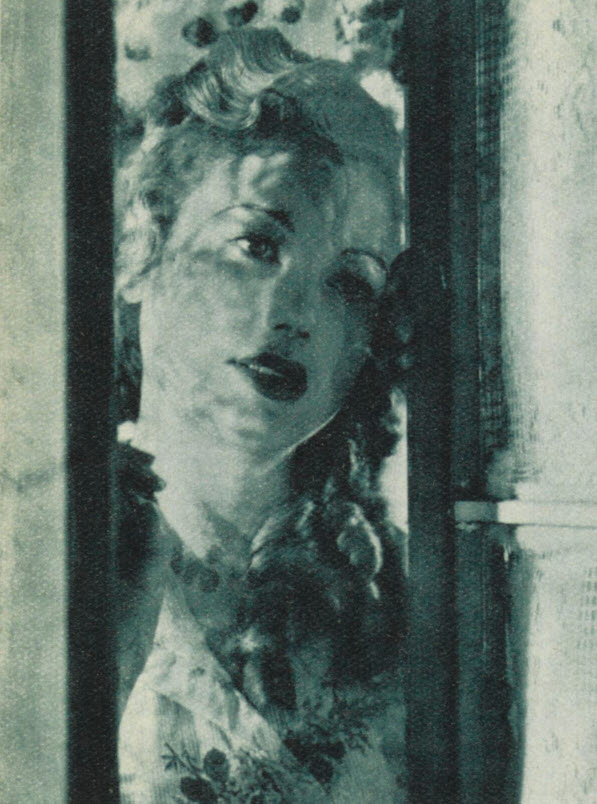
- Annie Vernay in 1939
- Born: 21 November 1921; Geneva, Switzerland
- Died: 15 August 1941 (aged 19); Buenos Aires, Argentina
- Other name: Annie Martine Jacqueline Vermeersch
- Occupation: Actress

Annie Vernay (November 21, 1921 – August 15, 1941) was a French actress, who emerged as a star of the French cinema before her sudden death at the age of nineteen. After winning a beauty contest, Vernay appeared in seven French films including Max Ophüls's The Novel of Werther (1938).

Her performances attracted interest from American studios. While en route to Hollywood via the Atlantic, she contracted typhus and died in Buenos Aires.

== Selected filmography ==
- The Lie of Nina Petrovna (1938)
- Princess Tarakanova (1938)
- The Novel of Werther (1938)
- The Mayor's Dilemma (1939)
- Hangman's Noose (1940)
- Sing Anyway (1940)

== Bibliography ==
- Goble, Alan. The Complete Index to Literary Sources in Film. Walter de Gruyter, 1999.
