= Yes (operetta) =

1928 operetta by Maurice Yvain

Yes is an operetta in three acts with music by composer Maurice Yvain, lyrics by Albert Willemetz, and a book by René Pujol and Pierre Souvaine. It was written as a starring vehicle for the French singer and actress Arletty. The work shares the same story as the 1928 silent film The Story of a Little Parisian (French: Totte et sa chance) and the two works were released in conjunction with one another. It premiered at the Théâtre des Capucines in Paris on January 26, 1928.
