= Tragedy at the Royal Circus =

1928 film

- Directed by: Alfred Lind
- Written by: Alfred Lind; Armin Petersen
- Produced by: Seymour Nebenzal
- Starring: Bernhard Goetzke; Ellen Kürti; Werner Pittschau
- Cinematography: Edgar S. Ziesemer
- Music by: Alexander Schirmann
- Production company: Nero Film
- Distributed by: Deutsche Lichtspiel-Syndikat
- Release date: 23 February 1928
- Country: Germany
- Languages: Silent; German intertitles

Tragedy at the Royal Circus (German: Tragödie im Zirkus Royal) is a 1928 German silent drama film directed by Alfred Lind and starring Bernhard Goetzke, Ellen Kürti, and Werner Pittschau.

The film's art direction was by Willi Herrmann and Bernhard Schwidewski

== Cast ==
- Bernhard Goetzke as Dr. Magirus
- Ellen Kürti as Ziska
- Werner Pittschau as Frank
- Sig Arno as Atto
- Helene von Bolváry as Frau Direktor Saltarelli
- Carl Auen as Armand

== Bibliography ==
- Greco, Joseph (1999). The File on Robert Siodmak in Hollywood, 1941–1951. Universal-Publishers. ISBN 978-1-58112-081-3.
