= Seymour Nebenzal =

American film producer

- Born: 22 July 1899; New York City, U.S.
- Died: 23 September 1961 (aged 62); Munich, West Germany
- Occupation: Film producer
- Years active: 1927–1961

Seymour Nebenzal (22 July 1899 – 23 September 1961) was an American-born Jewish-German film producer. He produced 46 films between 1927 and 1961.

== Biography ==
=== Germany ===
He got into film production through his father Heinrich Nebenzahl (1870–1938), who, in the early 1920s, worked with German action star Harry Piel.

In 1926, Heinrich Nebenzahl and director-producer Richard Oswald founded the company Nero-Film. As head of this company Seymour Nebenzal became one of the most important producers of the transition period from silent to sound film in Germany. He worked with the directors Georg Wilhelm Pabst, Arthur Ripley, Douglas Sirk, Harold S. Bucquet, Edgar G. Ulmer, Léonide Moguy, Paul Czinner and Fritz Lang among others. In 1933, he was forced into exile, fleeing the Nazis.

=== France ===
In Paris he produced films by other exiles from Germany such as his cousin Robert Siodmak and Max Ophüls as well as Anatole Litvak, Fedor Ozep, and Raymond Bernard.

=== Hollywood ===
In 1939, he went on to Hollywood where he became one of the first independent producers. He made films with Edgar G. Ulmer, Douglas Sirk, Léonide Moguy, Arthur Ripley, and Albert S. Rogell. He produced remakes of his successes from the early 1930s: Siren of Atlantis with Maria Montez and M (1951), that was directed by Joseph Losey.

In October 1946, he paid $150,000 for the world rights to Madame Butterfly. He signed Jean-Pierre Aumont to a three-film contract following Atlantis. He had screen rights to Look Homeward, Angel but the film was not made. Maria Montez successfully sued Seymour for unpaid salary for Atlantis.

Seymour Nebenzal died of a heart attack at his Munich home.

Harold Nebenzal (born 31 March 1922, Berlin – died 14 February 2019 in Los Angeles), associate producer of M (1951), was his son. Harold became a script writer (The Wilby Conspiracy), film producer (Cabaret, Gabriela) and novelist (Cafe Berlin). Harold, husband of actress Rita Corday, was in charge of foreign film production for many years for MGM, and also worked on many of the films of Billy Wilder including Fedora. Seymour Nebenzal had, many years earlier, made possible Wilder's first film, People on Sunday, by borrowing the needed funds to make the picture from his own father, Heinrich Nebenzahl, the first Nebenzal film producer.

== Selected filmography ==
- His Greatest Bluff (1927)
- The Prisoners of Shanghai (1927)
- Night of Mystery (1927)
- The Last Fort (1928)
- Love's Masquerade (1928)
- The Story of a Little Parisian (1928)
- Tragedy at the Royal Circus (1928)
- Scampolo (1928)
- Die Büchse der Pandora (1929)
- Perjury (1929)
- Diary of a Coquette (1929)
- Marriage in Trouble (1929)
- People on Sunday (1930)
- Westfront 1918 (1930)
- Scandalous Eva (1930)
- The Widow's Ball (1930)
- Kohlhiesel's Daughters (1930)
- Die 3-Groschen-Oper (1931)
- Ariane (1931)
- A Night at the Grand Hotel (1931)
- M (1931)
- Ariane (1931)
- 24 Hours in the Life of a Woman (1931)
- Kameradschaft (1931)
- L'Atlantide (1932) three versions: German, French, and English
- Das Testament des Dr. Mabuse (1933)
- Le sexe faible (1933)
- Three Lucky Fools (1933)
- The Crisis is Over (1934)
- Parisian Life (1936)
- Mayerling (1936)
- White Cargo (1937)
- The Novel of Werther (1938)
- Princess Tarakanova (1938)
- The Mayor's Dilemma (1939)
- We Who Are Young (1940)
- Hitler's Madman (1943)
- Summer Storm (1944)
- Whistle Stop (1945)
- The Chase (1946)
- Siren of Atlantis (1948)
- M (1951)
- Girl from Hong Kong (1961)
