= Katharina Knie (musical) =

Getman musician

Katharina Knie is a German musical composed by Mischa Spoliansky with a libretto by Robert Gilbert. It is based on the 1928 play Katharina Knie by Carl Zuckmayer. It was first performed on 20 January 1957 at the Staatstheater am Gärtnerplatz in Munich. Hans Albers appeared in the original production, his final stage role.

== Plot ==
In a small town, the traveling circus Knie is devastated by the effects of inflation. Acrobat Karl Knie asserts himself as a sort of manager, unimpressed with the main attraction of the circus and the circus band. When his daughter Katharina falls in love with a farmer named Roth Acker, a decision has to be made to either continue their lives as wanderers in the circus, or change their way of life completely. Katharina's decision poses challenges to the circus dynasty.

== Bibliography ==
- Kosta, Barbara. Willing Seduction: The Blue Angel, Marlene Dietrich, and Mass Culture. Berghahn Books, 2012.
