= Katharina Knie (film) =

1929 film directed by Karl Grune

- Directed by: Karl Grune
- Written by: Franz Höllering
- Based on: Katharina Knie by Carl Zuckmayer
- Produced by: Karl Grune; Curt Prickler
- Starring: Eugen Klöpfer; Carmen Boni; Adele Sandrock; Fritz Kampers
- Cinematography: Karl Hasselmann
- Music by: Werner Schmidt-Boelcke
- Production company: Karl Grune Film
- Distributed by: Bavaria Film
- Release date: 13 December 1929
- Running time: 81 minutes
- Country: Germany
- Languages: Silent; German intertitles

Katharina Knie is a 1929 German silent drama film directed by Karl Grune and starring Eugen Klöpfer, Carmen Boni and Adele Sandrock. It is based on the 1928 play of the same title by Carl Zuckmayer. It was shot at the Babelsberg Studios in Berlin. The film's art direction was by Robert Neppach and Erwin Scharf. It was distributed by the Munich-based Bavaria Film.

== Cast ==
- Eugen Klöpfer as Der alte Knie
- Carmen Boni as Katherina Knie
- Adele Sandrock as Bibo
- Fritz Kampers as Ignaz Scheel, Trapezkünstler
- Vladimir Sokoloff as Julius, der Clown
- Viktor de Kowa as Lorenz Knie
- Peter Voß as Rothhacker, Gutsbesitzer
- Frida Richard as Rothhackers Mutter
- Fraenze Roloff as Magd
- Willi Forst as Dr. Schindler
- Ilse Bachmann as Seine Freundin
- Louis Treumann as Variétedirektor
- Wilhelm Diegelmann as Gerichtsvollzieher
- Carla Bartheel
- Ernst Busch
- Karl Etlinger
- Ursula Grabley
- Otto Sauter-Sarto
- Ludwig Stössel
- Michael von Newlinsky
- Aribert Wäscher

== Bibliography ==
- Kreimeier, Klaus. The Ufa Story: A History of Germany's Greatest Film Company, 1918-1945. University of California Press, 1999.
