= Edgar Ziesemer =

German cinematographer

- Born: 18 July 1895; Berlin; German Empire
- Died: 21 October 1971 (aged 76); West Berlin
- Other name: Edgar S. Ziesemer
- Occupation: Cinematographer
- Years active: 1918 - 1954

Edgar Ziesemer (1895–1971) was a German cinematographer.

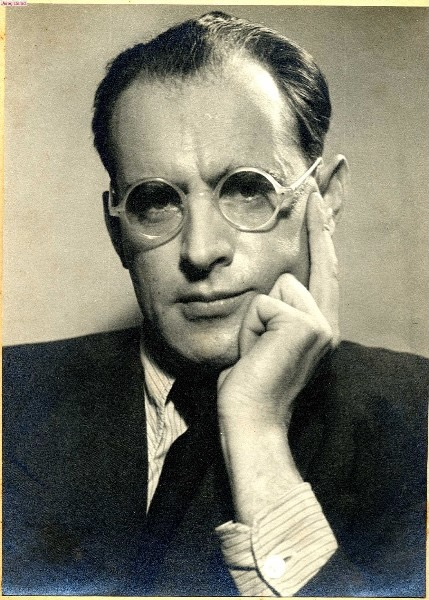
Portrait of Edgar Ziesemer

== Selected filmography ==
- Derby (1926)
- State Attorney Jordan (1926)
- Venus im Frack (1927)
- A Crazy Night (1927)
- One Plus One Equals Three (1927)
- Always Be True and Faithful (1927)
- Yacht of the Seven Sins (1928)
- Because I Love You (1928)
- Tragedy at the Royal Circus (1928)
- At Ruedesheimer Castle There Is a Lime Tree (1928)
- Black Forest Girl (1929)
- Scapa Flow (1930)
- Cavaliers of the Kurfürstendamm (1932)
- Thunder, Lightning and Sunshine (1936)
- The Vagabonds (1937)
- Autobus S (1937)
- Sherlock Holmes (1937)
- Monika (1938)
- The Holm Murder Case (1938)
- Frieder und Catherlieschen (1940)

== Bibliography ==
- Kester, Bernadette. Film Front Weimar: Representations of the First World War in German films of the Weimar Period (1919-1933). Amsterdam University Press, 2003.
