= M (1951 film) =

1951 film directed by Joseph Losey

- Original film poster
- Directed by: Joseph Losey
- Screenplay by: Norman Reilly Raine; Leo Katcher
- Additional dialogue by: Waldo Salt
- Based on: M by: Fritz Lang; Thea von Harbou
- Produced by: Seymour Nebenzal
- Starring: David Wayne; Howard Da Silva; Luther Adler; Martin Gabel; Steve Brodie; Raymond Burr; Glenn Anders; Karen Morley; Norman Lloyd
- Cinematography: Ernest Laszlo
- Edited by: Edward Mann
- Music by: Michel Michelet
- Production company: Superior Pictures
- Distributed by: Columbia Pictures
- Release date: March 1951 (U.S.)
- Running time: 88 minutes
- Country: United States
- Language: English

M is a 1951 American thriller film noir directed by Joseph Losey, an English-language remake of Fritz Lang's 1931 German film about a child murderer. The film stars David Wayne, Howard da Silva, Luther Adler and Martin Gabel in the leading roles. This version shifts the location of the action from Berlin to Los Angeles. Both versions of M were produced by Seymour Nebenzal, whose son, Harold, was associate producer of the 1951 version.

The film was produced independently, and released by Columbia Pictures in March 1951. Much as the original film was widely interpreted as an allegory for Nazism, Losey's interpretation was influenced by his experiences in the Red Scare and the Hollywood blacklist. Several of the cast and crew would be targeted by the blacklist, and Losey himself would move to Europe soon after the film's release when he was subpoenaed by the House Un-American Activities Committee.

== Plot ==
In Los Angeles, a string of child murders terrorizes the populace. The perpetrator stalks and lures his victims, before killing them via strangulation and taking their shoes as mementos. The police start a crackdown on criminal operations, dive bars and hangouts in the city, hoping that the murderer will turn up in one of the many raids. Several innocent people are caught up in the hysteria.

This pressure is preventing the city's crime syndicate from doing business, and its boss, Charlie Marshall, organizes his forces to find and stop the murderer so that the police will stop the crackdown and Marshall return to business as usual. Marshall hopes the positive publicity from capturing the so-called "baby killer" will sway public opinion in his favor in an upcoming racketeering trial.

Meanwhile, Police Detective Carney has a psychologist examining patients who have been released from mental hospitals as possible suspects, profiling the perpetrator as a possible paranoid schizophrenic with childhood trauma.

Searching the apartment of one of the suspects, Martin W. Harrow, police find a collection of young girls' shoes behind a hidden panel. Meanwhile, Harrow lures another girl at a carnival, but is recognized by a blind balloon vendor due to a distinctive tune he plays on a recorder. One of Marshall's street hooligans covertly marks Harrow with the letter 'M' (for 'murderer') on his back. Harrow is swiftly pursued by both police and the mobsters, and flees with his intended victim to the Bradbury Building. When the building's night watchman inadvertently locks him and the girl in a storage room on the top floor, Harrow panics and struggles frantically to break out.

Marshall brings an army of accomplices to the Bradbury to search it, breaking in and knocking out the watchman. They track Harrow down by his knocking (from trying to open the locked door), and break into the room, freeing the girl and taking Harrow captive just as police arrive.

Two of Marshall's men are captured. Detective Carney falsely claims that the watchman died of his injuries to get them to reveal Marshall's hideout, an underground garage, where Harrow is being placed on trial by his "peers" in the Los Angeles criminal underworld. However, a gathered crowd of bystanders (including some of the parents of Harrow's victims) calls for his death. Fearing Harrow will be lynched and himself implicated for the killing, Marshall orders his alcoholic lawyer Dan Langley to "defend" Harrow before police and the press arrive.

Harrow makes an impassioned plea for his life, explaining that he is unable to stop himself from committing his unspeakable crimes. Langley, experiencing withdrawal, defends Harrow and denounces Marshall for his own criminality. Marshall shoots and kills Langley just as police arrive, taking both him and Harrow into custody.

== Cast ==
- David Wayne as Martin W. Harrow
- Howard Da Silva as Det. Carney
- Luther Adler as Dan Langley
- Martin Gabel as Charlie Marshall
- Steve Brodie as Lt. Becker
- Raymond Burr as Pottsy
- Glenn Anders as Riggert
- Karen Morley as Mrs. Coster
- Norman Lloyd as Sutro
- John Miljan as Blind balloon vender
- Walter Burke as MacMahan
- Roy Engel as Police Chief Regan
- Benny Burt as Jansen
- Leonard Bremen as Lembre
- Jim Backus as The Mayor
- Janine Perreau as Last girl
- Robin Fletcher as Elsie Coster
- Bernard Szold as Bradbury Building watchman
- Jorja Curtright as Mrs. Stewart

== Production ==
“In a way my being blacklisted was one of best things that ever happened to me as a filmmaker. Otherwise I might have stayed on in Hollywood merely making money instead of making pictures I want to make. What could be worse than that.” - Joseph Losey interview with Gene D. Phillips, Journal of Popular Film (1976)

=== Development ===
Producer Seymour Nebenzel's Nero Films produced the original 1931 version of M directed by Fritz Lang, and Nebenzal retained the rights when he fled Nazi Germany and began to make films in Hollywood, primarily "B" pictures for major studios and low-budget independents. Nebenzal decided in 1950 to remake M, reset to Los Angeles—perhaps inspired by the anti-Communist mass hysteria then predominant in the country—and approached Lang about directing it, but Lang was appalled and outraged by the idea of anyone remaking a film he considered to be his masterpiece. Nebenzal then approached another expatriate German film director, Douglas Sirk, who also turned him down.

Joseph Losey took on the job, despite his being under suspicion of being a Communist by the FBI and the House Un-American Activities Committee. Losey registered discontent with Columbia Pictures’ financing of the film and the limitations placed on altering the structure of the Lang original. Denying that the film was merely a “remake,” Losey “regretted that he wasn't able to make more extensive changes to the original.”

=== Casting ===
Losey's casting included actors who were also under suspicion from the Hollywood blacklist. M was Howard Da Silva's last film appearance until 1962's David and Lisa. Karen Morley was blacklisted in 1947, and this was one of her final film roles. Luther Adler was also blacklisted for a time, as was screenwriter Waldo Salt. M was also the screen debut of Martin Gabel, an original member of Orson Welles' Mercury Theatre troupe.

Losey would later leave the U.S. and settle in the UK to make films there, notably his collaborations with writer Harold Pinter: The Servant (1963), Accident (1967) and The Go-Between (1971).

J. Roy Hunt was originally hired as the film's cinematographer, but left early in filming and was replaced by Ernest Laszlo.

=== Filming locations ===
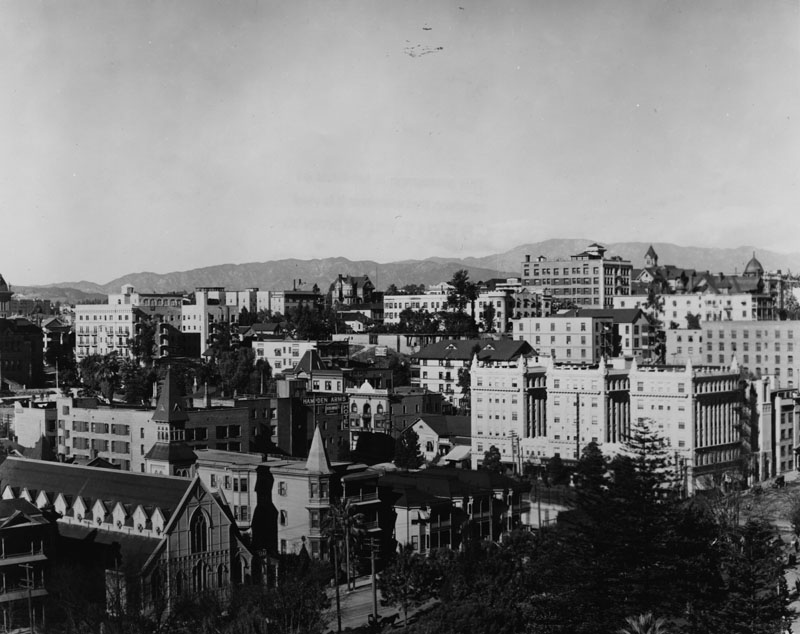
Old Bunker Hill, c. 1900

The film was shot on location in downtown Los Angeles, including the now demolished Victorian neighborhood of Bunker Hill. David Wayne's character lived at an eccentric Victorian mansion on Bunker Hill Avenue known as the Max Heindel house because Heindel, a famous astrologer in the early 20th century, had once lived there.

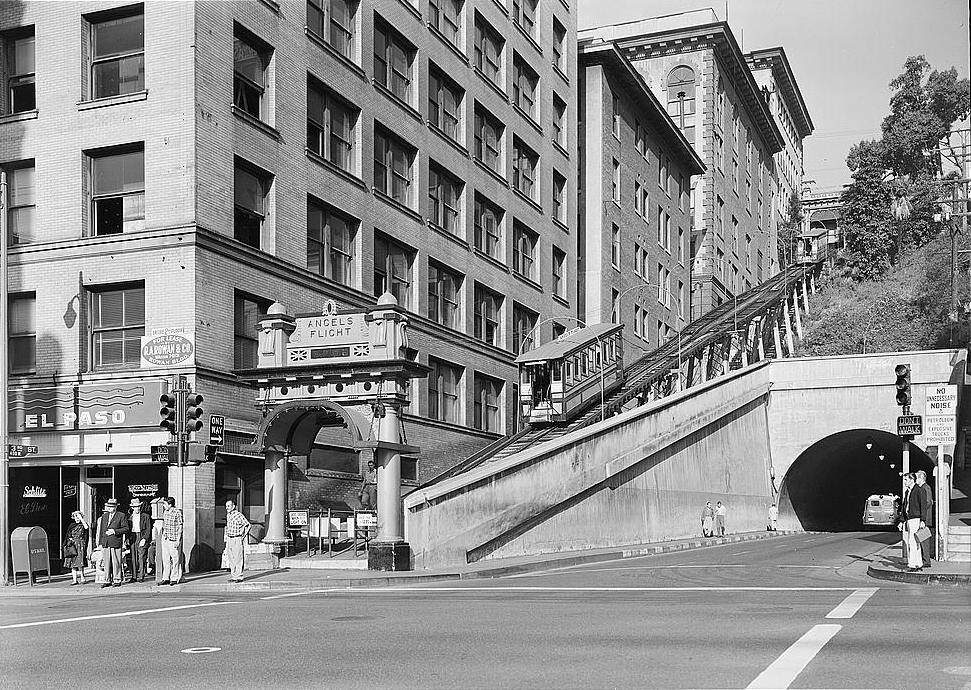
Angels Flight in 1960.

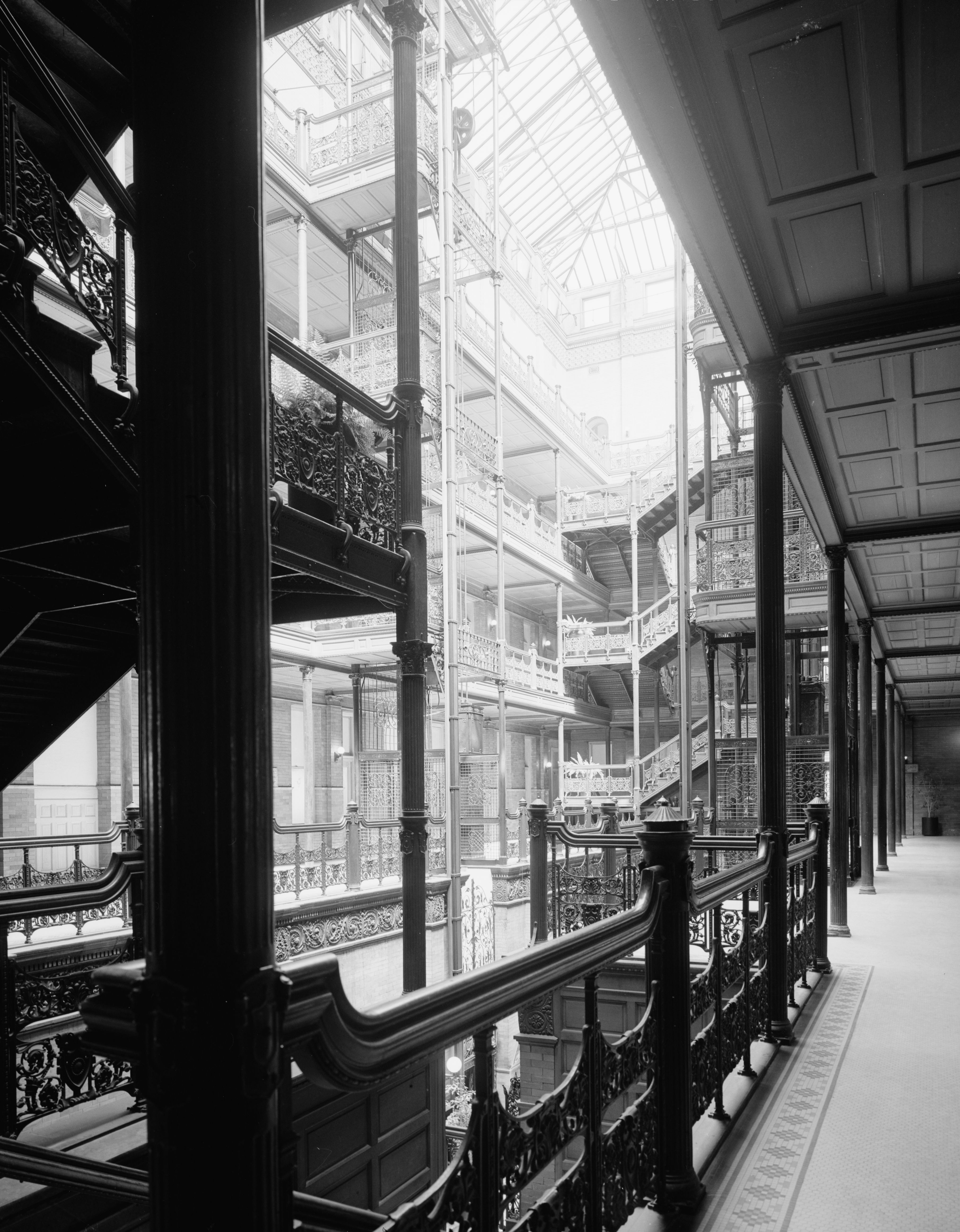
Interior of the Bradbury Building.

Some scenes were shot on and around the funicular Angels Flight on Third Street. The most spectacular footage occurs in a lengthy sequence shot inside the Bradbury Building on the southeast corner of Broadway and Third, a block east of Angels Flight. Losey used the basement, the distinctive stairways, elevators and balconies, and the roof of the building.

Studio interiors were filmed at Motion Picture Center Studios.

Robert Aldrich was Losey's assistant director on the film.

== Comparison to 1931 film ==
Just as the rising threat of fascism in Germany informed director Fritz Lang's 1931 original production, Losey's treatment was influenced by the Red Scare and blacklist of the late 1940s and 1950s. In his M, a reactionary community proves itself “mercilessly efficient in exorcizing alien elements from its midst.”

Film historian Foster Hirsch points to stylistic and thematic parallels between the two versions, but cautions that Losey may suffer from comparisons. Lang demonstrated “unsurpassed” cinematic control over his resources: “his M is the work of a film master.” Losey's remake was crafted when he was developing his talents, lacking the “experience and artistic freedom to compete with Lang.” Studio constraints limited Losey to making stylistic facsimile of the earlier film, and, “wasn't permitted a truly original handling of the material.” Nonetheless, similarities emerge:

Both directors are preoccupied with enclosure and entrapment; both share a deterministic world-view. A grim fate stalks Losey’s character as much as it does Lang’s. The meticulously preplanned mise-en-scène of both directors allows no space for the spontaneous, the accidental, or the fortuitous.

Losey diverges sharply from Lang's M in his conception of the pedophilic murderer. Peter Lorre's diminutive “M” in the original is furtive, socially isolated and distinctly repellent. Losey's sociopath, played by David Wayne, is by all appearances a well-adjusted Midwesterner. As such, he makes a favorable first impression on the local community. Wayne's confession and plea for psychiatric treatment suggests the possibility of redemption and pity from the community. Senses of Cinema’s Dan Callahan reports that “Wayne ... delivers this complex speech superbly (Losey reports that when he finished the cast and crew burst into applause.)”

Lorre's “ecstatic” interpretation is reminiscent of characters from Greek mythology or Christian scripture, invoking “Orestes Pursued by the Furies, or Satan expelled from heaven and suffering the torments of hell.”

== Reception ==
When the film was released, an anonymous reviewer at Variety wrote: "David Wayne, as the killer of small children, is effective and convincing. Luther Adler, as a drunken lawyer member of a gangster mob, turns in an outstanding performance, as do Martin Gabel, the gang-leader, and Howard da Silva and Steve Brodie as police officials ... Joseph Losey's direction has captured the gruesome theme skilfully [sic]." Wayne in particular received good reviews.

Fritz Lang remarked that the release of the 1951 film earned his 1931 original the best reviews of his career.

In a retrospective review, film historian David Thomson wrote "Losey’s M is a marvelous, frightening film, years ahead of its time and typical of his American virtues: narrative economy; sustained camera setups based on dynamic composition; the ability to make characters reveal themselves quickly and naturally; and the power to get good performances from actors."

== Censorship ==
M was boycotted in some cities because of director Losey's political views.

The film was classified by Ohio film censors as unacceptable for public screenings. At the end of 1953, the film's producers appealed to the U.S. Supreme Court, and in 1954, M was approved for exhibition in Ohio without any cuts.

== See also ==
- List of American films of 1951

== Sources ==
- Callahan, Dan. 2003. Losey, Joseph. Senses of Cinema, March 2003. Great Directors Issue 25.https://www.sensesofcinema.com/2003/great-directors/losey/#:~:text=The%20dominant%20themes%20of%20Losey's,love%20story%20in%20his%20films. Accessed 12 October 2024.
- Hirsch, Foster. 1980. Joseph Losey. Twayne Publishers, Boston, Massachusetts. ISBN 0-8057-9257-0
- Palmer, James and Riley, Michael. 1993. The Films of Joseph Losey. Cambridge University Press, Cambridge, England. ISBN 0-521-38386-2
- Thomson, David. 2002. The New Biographical Dictionary of Film. Alfred A. Knopf, New York. ISBN 0-375-41128-3
