= Katharina Knie (play) =

Katharina Knie is a 1928 play by the German writer Carl Zuckmayer. It was first performed on 20 December 1928 at the Lessing Theater in Berlin starring Elisabeth Lennartz and Albert Bassermann.

== Adaptations ==
- In 1929 the film was turned into a silent film Katharina Knie directed by Karl Grune
- In 1957 it served as the basis for the musical Katharina Knie composed by Mischa Spoliansky with a libretto by Robert Gilbert
- It was also adapted for two television films released in 1964 and 1973.

== Bibliography ==
- Wagener, Hans. Carl Zuckmayer Criticism: Tracing Endangered Fame. Camden House, 1995.
