= Pourquoi Israël =

- Directed by: Claude Lanzmann
- Written by: Claude Lanzmann
- Produced by: Véra Belmont; Maurice Bidermann
- Cinematography: William Lubtchansky; Colin Mounier
- Edited by: Françoise Belloux; Ziva Postec
- Production companies: Stéphan Films; Compagnie d'Entreprise et de Gestion (CEG); Parafrance Films; Vides Cinematografica
- Distributed by: NEF Diffusion; Planfilm
- Release date: 7 October 1973 (NYFF)
- Running time: 185 minutes
- Countries: Italy; France
- Languages: French; German; Hebrew; English; Russian

Pourquoi Israël (Israel, Why) is a 1973 French documentary film by Claude Lanzmann in his directorial debut. Premiered just three days after the Yom Kippur War in Israel, it examines life in Israel 25 years after the birth of the state. Lanzmann spends time with, among others, German-Jewish émigrés, intellectuals, dock workers, police, prison inmates and the newly arrived, surveying life in the new homeland. The title is often incorrectly given as a question ("Why Israel?"); however, Lanzmann intended it as an answer or an explanation from a collection of viewpoints.

International media attention arose following an incident in Hamburg, where leftist groups violently prevented a showing in October 2009, claiming the movie took a one-sided Zionist perspective.
