= Carmen Boni =

Italian actress (1901–1963)

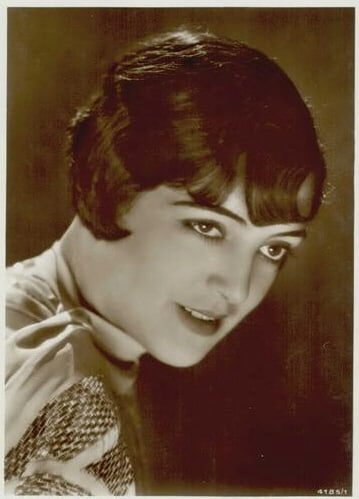
- Born: Maria Carmela Bonicatti; 8 April 1901; Rome, Kingdom of Italy
- Died: 18 November 1963 (aged 62); Paris, France
- Occupation: Actress
- Years active: 1919–1948
- Spouses: Augusto Genina (m. 1924; div. 1934) Jean Rigaux (m. 1936)

Carmen Boni (born Maria Carmela Bonicatti; 8 April 1901 – 18 November 1963) was an Italian actress.

== Biography ==
Maria Carmela Bonicatti was born on 8 April 1901 in Rome to a colonel and Teresa Rovere di Bergeggi. Her birth date has also been given as 17 April 1904. Her brother was the cinematographer Mario Bonicatti.

In 1919, Bonicatti made her film debut in Ave Maria, gratia plena!, which was directed by Diana Karenne. She took on the stage name Carmen Boni, which was suggested by Karenne, and in the following years mostly played young, naïve girls in Italian comedies and romances and quickly advanced to leading roles, often directed by Guglielmo Zorzi.

In 1924, she acted in The Beautiful Wife, directed by Augusto Genina. They married and she became his muse, appearing in most of his films throughout the course of their marriage, including The Hearth Turned Off (1925), The Last Lord (1926), and Goodbye Youth (1927). Boni attracted international attention for her role in The Last Lord, which led to her receiving an offer from Germany to take on the leading role in Agitated Women (1927) alongside Asta Nielsen and Gustav Fröhlich.

She remained in Germany and starred in films such as The Prisoners of Shanghai (1927), The Story of a Little Parisian (1928), Love's Masquerade (1928), Princess Olala (1928), The Adjutant of the Czar (1929), Latin Quarter (1929), and Katharina Knie (1929).

With the advent of talkies, Boni's career in Germany came to an end due to the language barrier. She returned to Italy, where she made her talkie debut in The Call of the Heart (1930). In France, she starred in The Woman Dressed As a Man (1932).

Boni and Genina divorced in 1934, which also effectively ended their professional collaboration. Boni attempted suicide shortly after their divorce, and married the French actor and songwriter Jean Rigaux in 1936. She did not appear in any films until The Count of Monte Cristo – Part 2: Retribution (1943). Her final screen appearance was in Man to Men (1948).

== Death ==
Boni died on 18 November 1963 in a traffic accident; another car crashed into hers on the Place des Ternes when she was on her way to have lunch with Rigaux.

== Selected filmography ==
- Passion for People (1921)
- La dama de Chez Maxim's (1923)
- The Hearth Turned Off (1925)
- The Prisoners of Shanghai (1927)
- Venus in Evening Wear (1927)
- Goodbye Youth (1927)
- Agitated Women (1927)
- The Merry Farmer (1927)
- Love's Masquerade (1928)
- Princess Olala (1928)
- Scampolo (1928)
- The Story of a Little Parisian (1928)
- Katharina Knie (1929)
- The Adjutant of the Czar (1929)
- Latin Quarter (1929)
- The Woman Dressed As a Man (1932)
- The Count of Monte Cristo (1943)
- Man to Men (1948)
