= Nero-Film =

German film company

Nero-Film AG was a German film production company founded in 1925 and based in Berlin during the Weimar era.

== History ==
The company's name was derived from the names of its two founders: the letters "NE" stood for the name of the entrepreneur Heinrich Nebenzahl, and the letters "RO" for the initials of director Richard Oswald. It was founded as Nero-Film GmbH, a limited liability company, and was converted into an Aktiengesellschaft, Nero-Film AG, in 1927.

Under the influence of Nebenzahl's son Seymour Nebenzal, Nero-Film was one of the most artistically ambitious production companies in Germany, and with directors like G.W. Pabst and Fritz Lang it produced a number of major films of the Weimar era, such as Pandora's Box, Westfront 1918, The Threepenny Opera, M, Kameradschaft, L'Atlantide and The Testament of Dr. Mabuse. In the film industry, the bourgeois-democratic Nero-Film and the proletarian Prometheus Film were the last bulwark against the rise of artistic Nazism. After the Nazi seizure of power in 1933, Seymour Nebenzal was forced to emigrate, and Nero-Film AG was put out of business. The Testament of Dr. Mabuse became the first film censored by the Nazi government; Nebenzal and Director Fritz Lang appeared before Reich Minister of Propaganda Joseph Goebbels, who ordered Mabuse destroyed and banned it from the Reich.

Nebenzal, using his American passport, fled that evening to Switzerland and then to France, where he re-established his company as Production Nero Film and, among other French productions, collaborated with the Director Anatole Litvak to produce Mayerling, a huge success for the star, Charles Boyer. Fleeing again to Los Angeles, as the Nazis invaded France, Nebenzal again re-established the company under the name of Nero Films Inc. Nebenzal's son, Harold, still manages the films in the Nero collection, including supervising a new print of his father's remake for Columbia Pictures in 1951 of M, directed by Joseph Losey that was featured at Cannes Film Festival in 2016.

== Selected filmography ==
- Die Gefangene von Shanghai (1927)
- Das letzte Fort (1928)
- Tragödie im Zirkus Royal (1928)
- Die Büchse der Pandora (1929)
- Menschen am Sonntag (1930)
- Vier von der Infanterie (1930)
- Skandal um Eva (1930)
- Die 3 Groschen-Oper (1931)
- Ariane (1931)
- M (1931)
- Kameradschaft (1931)
- L'Atlantide (1932) three versions: German, French, and English
- Das Testament des Dr. Mabuse (1933)

As Production Nero Film

- Le Sexe faible (1933)
- La crise est finie (1934)
- La Vie parisienne (1936)
- Mayerling (1936)
- Le Roman de Werther (1938)
- The Mayor's Dilemma (1939)

As Nero Films Inc.

- We Who Are Young (1940)
- Hitler's Madman (1943)
- Summer Storm (1944)
- Whistle Stop (1945)
- The Chase (1946)
- Heaven Only Knows (1947)
- Siren of Atlantis (1948)
- M (1951)
- Bis zum Ende aller Tage (1961)

Seymour Nebenzal's son Harold Nebenzal continued the three-generation tradition of Nero-Film through the production of such motion picture masterpieces as Cabaret and Gabriela.
