= New Objectivity (filmmaking) =

Movement in film

New Objectivity (a translation of the German Neue Sachlichkeit, alternatively translated as "New Sobriety" or "New matter-of-factness") was an art movement that emerged in Germany in the early 1920s as a counter to expressionism. The term applies to a number of artistic forms, including film.

== History ==
In film, New Objectivity reached its high point around 1929. It translated into realistic cinematic settings, straightforward camerawork and editing, a tendency to examine inanimate objects as a way to interpret characters and events, a lack of overt emotionalism, and social themes.

== Notable directors ==
The director most associated with the movement is Georg Wilhelm Pabst. Pabst's films of the 1920s concentrate on subjects such as abortion, prostitution, labor disputes, homosexuality, and addiction. His cool and critical 1925 Joyless Street is a landmark of the objective style. Pabst's 1930 pacifist sound film Westfront 1918 views the World War I experience in a bleak, matter-of-fact way. With its clear denunciation of war, it was soon banned as unsuitable for public viewing.

Other directors in the style included Ernő Metzner, Berthold Viertel, and Gerhard Lamprecht.

== Decline ==
The movement ended essentially in 1933 with the fall of the Weimar Republic.

== Films ==
Films with New Objectivity themes and visual style include:

- Joyless Street, 1925
- Secrets of a Soul, 1926
- Uneasy Money, 1926
- The Love of Jeanne Ney, 1927
- Police Report: Hold-Up, short subject, 1928
- Pandora's Box, 1929
- People on Sunday, 1930
- Westfront 1918, 1930
