= André Andrejew =

Russian art director (1887–1967)

André Andrejew (21 January 1887 – 13 March 1967) was an art director of international cinema of the twentieth century.

== Early life ==
André Andrejew was born in Schawli (Lithuanian: Šiauliai), Russian Empire (now Lithuania), on 21 January 1887 as Andrej Andreyev (Russian: Андрей Андреев). He studied architecture at the Fine Arts Academy in Moscow. At the time in Russia, architecture could be studied at technical universities and with a more artistic angle at art academies, where the accent was on interior design and decor and students were trained as artists. After his studies, Andrejew worked as a scene designer at the Konstantin Stanislavski's Moscow Art Theatre.

== In Berlin ==
After the October Revolution of 1917, Andrejew left Russia. In Germany and Austria, he worked as a stage designer in theater productions in Berlin and Vienna, working among others with Max Reinhardt. In 1921/1922, he designed stage decorations for the Jasha Jushny's Der Blaue Vogel (Blue Bird), a legendary Russian émigré cabaret at Goltzstrasse in Berlin.

In 1923, he designed his first cinema décor for Raskolnikow, directed by Robert Wiene, film based upon Dostoyevsky's Crime and Punishment. This expressionist work made him the foremost art director in Germany. Rudolf Kurtz in his Expressionismus und Film (1926) wrote: "Andrejew is a typical Moscow mixture, distinction of the streaked folk art (his decors) dissolves the rhythm of images, creates gentle forms, establishes balance even when everything is broken and torn."

Germany produced at the time hundreds of feature movies each year, and as cinema was silent, they were often produced in a co-production with France and released in both countries with different language inter-titles. Andrejew designed décors for several major German and Franco-German productions directed by Pabst, Feyder, Duvivier, Christian-Jacque. The titles of this period include Dancing Vienna, Pandora's Box, The Threepenny Opera, Don Quixote, The Golem, Meyerling. For The Threepenny Opera (1930), directed by G.W. Pabst, Andrejew built huge sets of imaginary London in the vein of German Expressionism of the 1920s.

== France, Great Britain, Czechoslovakia: 1933-1940 ==
Immediately after Hitler took power in Germany in 1933, Andrejew as several other Russian artists living in Berlin left for Paris. At first, he worked with the directors who also left Germany (Fedor Ozep, Alexis Granowsky, G. W. Pabst), but later with the most successful French filmmakers of the time, working on art direction of numerous film productions in France, England, and Czechoslovakia. In collaboration with Pimenoff, Andrejew art directed 'Les Yeux Noirs'. Following this came sumptuous sets for 'Les Nuits Moscovites' and 'Myerling'. His sets for Duvivier's 'Golem' made in Prague were remarkable, the camera reproducing the artist's original designs very faithfully. Toeplitz brought Andrejew to England in 1937 to make 'The Dictator', and he stayed on to make 'Whom the Gods Love' for Basil Dean. Both these films were set against lavish eighteenth century backgrounds on which he was so much at home(...)Until 1937 he was associated with many productions for London Films but returned to his chateau in France in 1938. Just before the World War II, Andrejew was active in France making decors for two films with Pabst and several other films with L'Herbier, Ozep, Pottier, Lacombe and Mirande.

== War years in France: 1940-1944 ==
When Germany invaded France in May 1940 and the Vichy regime was established, German producer Alfred Greven and his firm Continental Films continued to produce French films. These films were shown in cinemas in France and other occupied by Germany countries, where cinema was seen by the Nazi regime as an important propaganda tool. Several directors left France escaping the Nazis as Luis Buñuel and Jean Renoir, but the directors who stayed in France like Marcel Carné, Jean Cocteau, Sacha Guitry continued to make films and André Andrejew continued to design and build film décors. These French films had nothing to do with the occupiers ideology. Their default was to pretend normality, while Europe suffered under the Nazi German occupation.

== Le Corbeau controversy ==
In 1943, Andrejew worked as a production designer on Le Corbeau, a thriller by Henri-Georges Clouzot. This anti-authoritarian film became very controversial during the occupation, when it was seen as indirectly attacking the Nazi system, and censored; yet after the liberation of France in August 1944, Le Corbeau was perceived as being made by collaborators, and it was rumored to have been released in Germany as Nazi anti-French propaganda, when in fact it was suppressed by the Germans.

However, the film was disliked by all political parties in postwar France, and there was a strong consensus to treat this movie as a scapegoat for a national feeling of guilt for not putting up enough resistance against Nazi Germany. Clouzot was at first banned for life from directing films in France; his actors, who acted also in other movies, were sentenced to long prison terms.

Several important personalities in France, including artist Jean Cocteau and philosopher Jean-Paul Sartre, went to the defense of Le Corbeau and Clouzot himself. Clouzot's ban was commuted to three years, counted from the release of Le Corbeau, which in fact meant two years' ban. Andrejew, as his close collaborator, was banned for nine months, forcing him to renew his English contacts.

The French ban on Le Corbeau was lifted only in 1969.

== Final years — Hollywood productions ==
Andrejew continued to work as a production designer in England, France, and from 1948, he designed décors for several major international productions as Anna Karenina, Alexander the Great (shot in Spain), and Anastasia.

Anna Karenina, produced by Alexander Korda and directed by Julien Duvivier, with the cinematography by Henri Alekan, costumes by Cecil Beaton and Vivien Leigh in the title part, stoods out in Andrejew's work. 'Andre Andrejew has done something that very few set designers for films set in czarist Russia are able to do: create the impression of sumptuous wealth without making the rooms look like nearly barbaric combination of harems and safaris. The seeming alien-ness of Russia, particularly before 1917, has influenced many set designers to make the place look strange and combine several bizarre cultures which have nothing to do with anything. This production of Anna Karenina takes into account something very important: Upper class Russians were, in effect, Europeans, and they tended to live in the same sort of surroundings as other Victorian-era Europeans did.´

In Alexander the Great (1956), Andrejew used existing elements of primitive Spanish architecture to create the richness and glory of ancient Greece and Persia in far more authentic way, than the plaster and plywood decorations in similar Hollywood films of the time. Andrejew's ideas were continued a decade later in the mythological films directed by Pier Paolo Pasolini, Edipo re (Oedipus Rex, 1967) with the production design by Luigi Scaccianoce, and Medea (1969) with the production design by Dante Ferretti.

Andrejew briefly returned to Berlin in 1952, to work on a Carol Reed's The Man Between. He made his last movies in the mid-1950s in Germany (then West Germany).

André Andrejew died of natural causes in Loudun, south of Paris on 13 March 1967.

== Influence of Andrejew on production design in film ==
Through his individual style of the art directing, the visual wealth and the artistic quality of his decors and the sheer number of films produced in different countries, Andrejew influenced for more than thirty years aesthetics of the art directing in Europe and America. Several production designers were following his style and today Andrejew is regarded as a classic. Edith C. Lee writes about him: As critics began to condemn any strongly stated art direction as distracting, Andrejew slightly toned down his style. Nonetheless, he maintained his belief in the importance of intrinsic meaning in design.

Andrejew's production drawings are today in the collections in France and Great Britain, they also appear on art auctions and offering by the commercial galleries in France. Cinémathèque Française in Paris presented several of Andrejew's gouaches during the exhibition 'Le cinéma expressionniste allemand — Splendeurs d'une collection (French Expressionist Cinema — Splendors of the Collection) ´ - held in winter of 2007. They were collected by Lotte H. Eisner, German film historian living in France, who documented for the Cinémathèque works of the most important Filmarchitekte of the German expressionist cinema.

French writer Lucie Derain described Andrejew at the peak of his career as "an artist of the grand style, blessed with a vision of lyrical quality." Edith C. Lee wrote: "Believing in creative freedom rather than academic reconstruction, André Andrejew fulfilled the 20th century's notion of the romantic, individualistic artist. The unusual titillated his imagination."

== Filmography ==
This is a filmography of films made by André Andrejew as a production designer or an art director, as in Europe at the time there was no sharp distinction between these functions. This filmography lists a year of release (not of production), an original title of the film and the name of its director. Eventual Andrejew's collaborators are mentioned before the film director's name. Additionally, after some titles, some significant names of the cast or of the crew have been noted.

=== Germany: 1923 – 1933 ===
Silent films:

- 1923: Raskolnikov, Directed by Robert Wiene
- 1923: Die Macht der Finsternis, in collaboration with Heinrich Richter, Directed by Conrad Wiene
- 1925: Letters Which Never Reached Him, in collaboration with Gustav A. Knauer, Directed by Frederic Zelnik
- 1925: Old Mamsell's Secret, in collaboration with Gustav A. Knauer, Directed by Paul Merzbach
- 1925: The Dealer from Amsterdam, in collaboration with Gustav A. Knauer, Directed by Victor Janson
- 1925: The Bank Crash of Unter den Linden, in collaboration with Gustav A. Knauer, Directed by Paul Merzbach
- 1926: The Bohemian Dancer, in collaboration with Gustav A. Knauer, Directed by Frederic Zelnik, Cast: Lya Mara (Försterchristl)
- 1926: The Mill at Sanssouci, in collaboration with Gustav A. Knauer, Directed by Siegfried Philippi and Frederic Zelnik
- 1926: The Circus of Life, in collaboration with Karl Görge and August Rinaldi, Directed by Mario Bonnard and Guido Parish
- 1926: The Violet Eater, in collaboration with Hermann Krehan, Directed by Frederic Zelnik
- 1926: Superfluous People, in collaboration with Stefan Lhotka, Directed by Alexander Rasumny
- 1926: Fadette, in collaboration with Alexander Ferenczy, Directed by Frederic Zelnik
- 1927: The Gypsy Baron, in collaboration with Alexander Ferenczy, Directed by Frederic Zelnik
- 1927: The Weavers, Directed by Frederic Zelnik, Makeup designer: George Grosz
- 1927: Alpine Tragedy, Directed by Robert Land
- 1927: The Golden Abyss, Directed by Mario Bonnard
- 1927: Dancing Vienna, also known as An der schönen blauen Donau. 2. Teil, Directed by Frederic Zelnik
- 1927: Die Spielerin, in collaboration with Alexander Ferenczy; Directed by Graham Cutts, based upon Dostoyevski's The Player
- 1927: Im Luxuszug, Directed by Erich Schönfelder
- 1928: Thérèse Raquin, Directed by Jacques Feyder
- 1928: Mariett Dances Today, in collaboration with Erich Zander, Directed by Frederic Zelnik
- 1928: Two Red Roses, Directed by Robert Land
- 1928: Marie Lou, Directed by Frederic Zelnik
- 1928: Der Ladenprinz, Directed by Erich Schönfelder
- 1928: The Saint and Her Fool, Directed by Wilhelm Dieterle
- 1929: My Heart is a Jazz Band, Directed by Frederic Zelnik; Cast: Lya Mara, Carl Goetz, Iwan Kowal-Samborskij, Alfred Abel
- 1928: Rapa-nui, Directed by Mario Bonnard
- 1928: Volga Volga, Directed by Victor Tourjansky
- 1928: Der Herzensphotograph, Directed by Max Reichmann
- 1929: Diane, Directed by Erich Waschneck, Cast: Henry Victor (Oberst Guy de Lasalle, Kommandant von Tschamschewa), Olga Chekhova (Diane), Pierre Blanchar (Leutnant Gaston Mévil)
- 1929: Pandora's Box, in collaboration with Gottlieb Hesch (Bohumil Heš); Directed by Georg Wilhelm Pabst, Cast: Louise Brooks (Loulou)
- 1929: The Love of the Brothers Rott, Directed by Erich Waschneck, Cast: Olga Chekhova aka Olga Tschechova (Theresa Donath) who also produced the film
- 1929: Der Narr seiner Liebe, Directed by Olga Chekhova aka Olga Tschechova
- 1929: Sprengbagger 1010, Directed by Carl Ludwig Achaz-Duisberg, Cast: Heinrich George (Direktor March), Viola Garden (Olga Lossen)
- 1930: Revolte im Erziehungshaus, Directed by Georg Asagaroff

sound films:

- 1930: The Last Company, Directed by Curtis Bernhardt (as Kurt Bernhardt)
- 1931: The Threepenny Opera, Directed by Georg Wilhelm Pabst; Treatment by Bertolt Brecht based upon the musical by Bertolt Brecht with the music by Kurt Weill. Screenplay by Leo Lania, Ladislaus Vajda and Béla Balázs
- 1931: The Theft of the Mona Lisa, in collaboration with Robert A. Dietrich; Directed by Geza von Bolvary
- 1931: His Highness Love, in collaboration with Erich Kettelhut; Directed by Robert Péguy and Erich Schmidt
- 1931: Liebeskommando, in collaboration with Robert A. Dietrich; directed by Geza von Bolvary
- 1932: Don Quixote, Directed by Georg Wilhelm Pabst; Cast: Feodor Chaliapin (Don Quixotte)
- 1932: Mirages de Paris, in collaboration with Lucien Aguettand; Directed by Fedor Ozep - * Note: a film produced in Germany in a co-production with France
- 1933: Grosstadtnacht, Directed by Fédor Ozep - * Note: a film produced in Germany in a co-production with France

=== France, Great Britain, Czechoslovakia : 1933 – 1940 ===
- 1933: The Old Devil, Directed by Anatole Litvak, Cast: Harry Baur (Professor Vautier), Alice Field (Helene), Kiki de Montparnasse aka Alice Prin (Kiki)
- 1933: On the Streets, Directed by Victor Trivas
- 1933: Volga in Flames, Directed by Victor Tourjansky
- 1934: Moscow Nights, Directed by Alexis Granowsky; Music Bronisław Kaper aka Bronislau Kapper and Walter Jurmann
- 1934: Whom the Gods Destroy, Directed by Walter Lang, Cast: Walter Connolly (John Forrester aka Eric Jann aka Peter Korotoff); * Note: a film produced in Great Britain
- 1935: The Dictator, Directed by Victor Saville; * Note: a film produced in Great Britain
- 1935: Taras Bulba, Directed by Alexis Granowsky
- 1936: Mayerling, Directed by Anatole Litvak, Written by: Marcel Achard, Claude Anet (novel), Joseph Kessel, Irma von Cube, Cast: Charles Boyer (Archduke Rudolph of Austria) and Danielle Darrieux (Marie Vetsera)
- 1936: Le Golem, in collaboration with Štěpán Kopecký; Directed by Julien Duvivier, * Note: a film produced in France, shot in Czechoslovakia
- 1936: The Beloved Vagabond, Directed by Curtis Bernhardt; * Note: film by a German director produced in Great Britain
- 1936: Das Gäßchen zum Paradies, Directed by W.L. Bagier and Martin Frič, Written by: Hugo Haas and Otakar Vávra; * Please Note: a film produced in Czechoslovakia
- 1937: Dark Journey originally released as The Anxious Years, with the collaboration of Ferdinand Bellan; Directed by Victor Saville; Cast: Conrad Veidt (Baron Karl Von Marwitz), Vivien Leigh (Madeleine Goddard); * Please note: a film produced in Great Britain
- 1937: The Citadel of Silence, Directed by Marcel L'Herbier
- 1938: Princess Tarakanova, Directed by Fedor Ozep, Cast: Annie Vernay
- 1938: The Shanghai Drama, Directed by Georg Wilhelm Pabst
- 1938: Lights of Paris, Directed by Richard Pottier
- 1939: The White Slave, Directed by Marc Sorkin; Supervised by Georg Wilhelm Pabst
- 1939: Jeunes filles en détresse, Directed by Georg Wilhelm Pabst
- 1939: Les Musiciens du ciel, Directed by Georges Lacombe
- 1939: Paris-New York, Directed by Yves Mirande

=== France, war time: 1940 – 1944 ===
- 1940: They Were Twelve Women, Directed by Georges Lacombe
- 1941: Caprices, Directed by Léo Joannon
- 1941: The Last of the Six, Directed by Georges Lacombe
- 1941: La Symphonie fantastique, Directed by Christian-Jacque
- 1941: Les évadés de l'an 4000, in collaboration with André Chaillez, Directed by Marcel Carné
- 1942: The Murderer Lives at Number 21, Directed by Henri-Georges Clouzot
- 1942: Twisted Mistress, Directed by André Cayatte
- 1942: La Main du diable, Directed by Maurice Tourneur
- 1942: Picpus, Directed by Richard Pottier
- 1942: Simplet, Directed by Fernandel and Carlo Rim
- 1943: Au bonheur des dames, Directed by André Cayatte
- 1943: Le Corbeau, Directed by Henri-Georges Clouzot
- 1943: La Ferme aux loups, Directed by Richard Pottier
- 1943: Mon amour est près de toi, Directed by Richard Pottier
- 1943: Pierre and Jean, Directed by André Cayatte
- 1944: Le dernier sou, Directed by André Cayatte; *Note: the movie released in 1946

=== Great Britain: 1947 – 1952 ===
- 1947: A Man About the House, Directed by Leslie Arliss
- 1948: Anna Karenina, Directed by Julien Duvivier, Produced by Alexander Korda, Screenplay by Julien Duvivier, Guy Moran and Jean Anouilh from Leo Tolstoy's novel, Photography by Henri Alekan, Costumes by Cecil Beaton, Cast: Vivien Leigh (Anna Karenina)
- 1948: The Winslow Boy, Directed by Anthony Asquith, cast: Robert Donat (Sir Robert Morton), Cedric Hardwicke (Arthur Winslow)
- 1949: That Dangerous Age also known in US as If This Be Sin, Directed by Gregory Ratoff, Cast: Myrna Loy (Lady Cathy Brooke)
- 1949: Britannia Mews, Directed by Jean Negulesco, Cast: Dana Andrews (Gilbert Lauderdale/Henry Lambert)
- 1950: The Angel with the Trumpet, Directed by Anthony Bushell
- 1950: My Daughter Joy, Directed by Gregory Ratoff; Set Decoration by Dario Simoni; Cast: Edward G. Robinson (George Constantin)
- 1953: The Man Between, Directed by Carol Reed, Cast: James Mason (Ivo Kern), Claire Bloom (Susanne Mallison)

=== Big Hollywood productions: 1953 – 1956 ===
- 1953: Melba, Directed by Lewis Milestone, Cast: Patrice Munsel (Nellie Melba)
- 1954: Mambo, Directed by Robert Rossen, Produced by Dino De Laurentiis and Carlo Ponti, Cast: Silvana Mangano (Giovanna Masetti), Vittorio Gassman (Mario Rossi), Shelley Winters (Toni Salerno)
- 1955: Alexander the Great, Directed by Robert Rossen, Cast: Richard Burton (Alexander the Great); *Note: a film shot in Spain
- 1956: Anastasia, Directed by Anatole Litvak, Cast: Ingrid Bergman (Anastasia), Yul Brynner (General Sergei Pavlovich Bounine)

=== Germany (West): 1956 – 1957 ===
- 1956: Bonjour Kathrin, Directed by Karl Anton, Cast: Caterina Valente (Kathrin)
- 1957 (released in January 1958): Escape from Sahara, in collaboration with Helmut Neutwig and Fritz Lippman; Directed by Wolfgang Staudte
