= Ernő Metzner =

Film director and production designer (1892–1953)

Ernő Metzner (February 25, 1892 – September 25, 1953) was a film director and production designer.

Metzner was born in Subotica (then Austria-Hungary). He studied art at the Budapest Academy of Fine Arts, then worked as a painter and graphic artist. In 1920 he moved to Berlin and began working as an art director and production designer with some of the best-known German directors of the time: Ernst Lubitsch (Sumurun, The Loves of Pharaoh), Robert Wiene (I.N.R.I.) and Karl Grune (Arabella). From the 1926 Secrets of a Soul he developed a close and continuous partnership with Georg Wilhelm Pabst. Metzner was art director for seven major Pabst films from 1926 to 1933, notably designing the production of Kameradschaft (1931), for which Metzner constructed realistic mining tunnels in the studio.

In 1927 Metzner began to direct films himself. His first short films are documentaries commissioned by the Social Democratic Party of Germany. His most important work is probably the 1928 short film Polizeibericht Überfall ("Police Report: Hold-Up", known in English as "Accident"). Metzner both wrote and directed this landmark of the New Objectivity movement in film, banned by authorities as "brutalizing and demoralizing."

As a Hungarian Jew, in 1933 Metzner emigrated from Germany to France and then to England, where he reunited with Austrian director Friedrich Feher. From 1936 Metzner moved with his family to the United States, but found only occasional work in Hollywood.

He died in Hollywood, California on September 25, 1953.

== Filmography ==
- Sumurun (1920) - Production Design
- The Bull of Olivera (1921) - Costumes
- The Loves of Pharaoh (1922) - Costumes
- Don Juan (1922) - Costumes
- Fridericus Rex (in four parts, 1922-1923) - Production Design
- Salome (1923) - Production Design
- Old Heidelberg (1923) - Production Design
- I.N.R.I. (1923) - Production Design, Costumes
- Explosion] (1923) - Costumes
- Arabella (1924) - Costumes
- Wood Love (1925) - Production Design, Costumes
- Secrets of a Soul (1926) - Production Design
- At the beginning was the Word (1927) - Director
- Naftalin (1927) - Director
- Free Ride (1928) - Director
- It rises (1928) - Director
- Mikosch Comes In (1928)
- Accident (1928) - Director, Screenplay
- Destiny (1928) - Director
- Hotel of Secrets (1929) - Production Design
- Diary of a Lost Girl (1929) - Production Design
- The White Hell of Pitz Palu (1929) - Features
- Westfront 1918 (1930) - Production Design
- Rivals for the World Record (1930) - Director, Screenwriter, Production Design
- Kameradschaft (1931) - Production Design
- The Unknown Guest (1931)
- The Firm Gets Married (1931)
- L'Atlantide (1932) - Production Design
- Monsieur, Madame and Bibi (1932) - Production Design
- Scandal on Park Street (1932)
- A Bit of Love (1932)
- Gypsies of the Night (1932)
- The Marathon Runner (1933)
- High and Low (1933) - Production Design
- Princess Charming (1934) - Production Design
- Chu Chin Chow (1934) - Production Design
- Oh, Daddy! (1935) - Production Design
- The Tunnel (1935) - Production Design
- The Robber Symphony (1936) - Production Design
- Seven Sinners (1936) - Production Design
- O.H.M.S. (1937) - Production Design
- Take My Tip (1937) - Production Design
- The Great Awakening (1941) - Production Design
- It Happened Tomorrow (1944) - Production Design
- The Macomber Affair (1947) - Production Design
