= University of Regina Department of Film =

Film school in Saskatchewan, Canada

Department of Film University of Regina

Location
- ED 243; University of Regina, S4S 0A2 Canada (Canada) Regina, Saskatchewan

Information
- Type: Public
- Established: 1970
- Campus: Urban
- Information: 306-585-4796

The Department of Film at the University of Regina is a Canadian film school that offers the only BFA in film production between Vancouver and Toronto.

The department also has BA and BA honours programs in film studies, as well as MFA and MA degree programs.

Film is one of four departments in the Faculty of Media, Art, and Performance (formerly the Faculty of Fine Arts), along with the departments of Visual Arts, Theatre, and Music. The university offers undergraduate and graduate programs.

== Focus ==
The department teaches film and digital media in an interdisciplinary environment, encouraging students' development in critical reasoning and creative expression. Students are provided with a wide range of learning experiences and practices in film production and film studies, preparing students to become film/media artists, craftspeople, historians, programmers, critics, and arts educators.

== History ==
The film program at the University of Regina began in the early 1970s, with courses taught by Jean (Hans) Oser, a German editor and filmmaker, whose career began in Berlin in the 1920s. Oser appeared in Hans Richter's 1928 film Ghosts Before Breakfast and Oser was editor on GW Pabst's The Threepenny Opera, Westfront 1918 and Kameradeschaft. With the rise of the Nazis, Oser's career continued in France and Hollywood, and included directing the 1953 Oscar-winning short film Light in the Window.

The department's first name was the Department of Film and Video. In 2003 the name was changed to the Department of Media Production & Studies and in 2013 it became the Department of Film.

== Alumni ==
Graduates from the programs include Gemini Award-winning Producers, Directors and Editors; independent filmmakers whose films have screened around the world; screenwriters, cinematographers, crew members, curators, festival programmers, and educators.

== Film Festival ==
Students have organised a student film festival since 1988. The film festival was renamed the Living Skies Student Film Festival in 2011, and takes place in late February/early March.
