= Four Infantrymen on the Western Front 1918 =

1929 novel by Ernst Johannsen

- Author: Ernst Johannsen
- Original title: Vier von der Infanterie
- Translator: A. W. Wheen
- Language: German
- Publication date: 1929
- Publication place: Germany
- English publication date: 1930

Four Infantrymen on the Western Front 1918 (German: Vier von der Infanterie. Ihre letzten Tage an der Westfront 1918) is a 1929 novel by the German writer Ernst Johannsen. It follows a group of German infantrymen on the Western Front near the end of World War I. It was one of two World War I novels by Johannsen published in 1929, along with Memories of a War Horse. Both novels have prominent anti-war sentiments.

A. W. Wheen's English translation of Four Infantrymen on the Western Front 1918 was published in the United Kingdom and United States in 1930. The novel was the basis for the 1930 film Westfront 1918 directed by G. W. Pabst. After the film's release, the novel was sometimes advertised in Germany under the name Westfront or Westfront 18, with Vier von der Infanterie as subtitle.
