= Mila Parély =

French actress (1917–2012)

- Born: Olga Colette Peszynski; 7 October 1917; Paris, France
- Died: 14 January 2012 (aged 94); Vichy, France
- Occupation: Actress
- Years active: 1932–1991
- Spouse: Thomas Alastair Sutherland Ogilvie Mathieson (m. 1947; died 1991)

Mila Parély (7 October 1917 – 14 January 2012), born Olga Colette Peszynski, was a French actress of Polish ancestry best known for the roles of Félicie, Belle's eldest sister, in Jean Cocteau's La Belle et la Bête (1946), and as Geneviève in La Règle du jeu (1939).

She had a relationship with actor Jean Marais, with whom she worked on Beauty and the Beast: they remained lifelong friends, and in the 1970s she became his business associate in a pottery shop and art gallery.

She gave up acting in the late 1950s in order to take care of her racing car driving husband Taso Mathieson, who had been injured in an accident.

She also worked with such notable directors as Max Ophüls, Jean Renoir, Robert Bresson, Fritz Lang and G.W. Pabst. She returned to acting briefly in the late 1980s.

Mila Parély died on 14 January 2012, aged 94, in Vichy, where she had spent the last fifty years of her life.

== Selected filmography ==
- Compliments of Mister Flow (1936)
- Royal Waltz (1936)
- The Brighton Twins (1936)
- The Shanghai Drama (1938)
- The Rules of the Game (1939)
- The White Slave (1939)
- The Phantom Carriage (1939)
- Extenuating Circumstances (1939)
- They Were Twelve Women (1940)
- Le Lit à colonnes (1942)
- The White Truck (1943)
- My Last Mistress (1943)
- Father Serge (1945)
- The Black Cavalier (1945)
- Beauty and the Beast (1946)
- Women's Games (1946)
- Destiny (1946)
- Star Without Light (1946)
- Last Refuge (1947)
- Snowbound (1948)
- Mission in Tangier (1949)
- Véronique (1950)
- Le Plaisir (1952)
- Blood Orange (1953)
