= The White Slave (1939 film) =

1939 film

- Directed by: Marc Sorkin
- Written by: Lilo Dammert; Léo Lania; Ákos Tolnay; Steve Passeur
- Produced by: Romain Pinès
- Starring: Viviane Romance; John Lodge; Marcel Dalio
- Cinematography: Michel Kelber
- Edited by: Louisette Hautecoeur
- Music by: Maurice Jaubert; Paul Dessau
- Production company: Lucia Film
- Distributed by: Les Distributions Associées
- Release date: 18 February 1939
- Running time: 98 minutes
- Country: France
- Language: French

The White Slave (French: L'esclave blanche) is a 1939 French drama film directed by Marc Sorkin and starring Viviane Romance, John Lodge and Marcel Dalio. German director Georg Wilhelm Pabst acted as a supervisor on the production. It was shot at the Saint-Maurice Studios in Paris. The film's sets were designed by the art directors Andrej Andrejew and Guy de Gastyne, while the costumes were by Marcel Escoffier. It is a loose remake of the 1927 German silent film of the same title.

== Synopsis ==
At the beginning of the twentieth century, a Frenchwoman marries a westernised Turkish diplomat and travels with him to his homeland with romantic expectations of an Arabian Nights lifestyle. However, she is shocked on getting there by the repressive attitude towards women. Worse, her husband falls out of favour with the Sultan, who faces growing dissent from the Young Turk movement.

== Cast ==
- Viviane Romance as Mireille
- John Lodge as Vedad Bey
- Marcel Dalio as Le sultan Soliman
- Sylvie as Safète – la mère de Vedad
- Mila Parély as Tarkine
- Paulette Pax as L'amie de Safète
- Marcel Lupovici as Mourad
- Roger Blin as Maïr
- Odile Pascal as Akilé, la soeur de Mourad
- Joe Alex as Ali
- Jacques Mattler as Un conseiller
- Louise Carletti as Sheyla
- Saturnin Fabre as Djemal Pacha
- Nicolas Amato as Un voyageur
- Jean Brochard as Le chef électricien
- Yvonne Yma as Une Turque dans le train
- Léon Larive as Un fonctionnaire
- Claire Gérard as Une visiteuse
- Odette Talazac as La mère de Soliman
- Gaby André as Une femme du harem

== Bibliography ==
- Rentschler, Eric. The Films of G.W. Pabst: An Extraterritorial Cinema. Rutgers University Press, 1990.
- Slavin, David Henry . Colonial Cinema and Imperial France, 1919–1939: White Blind Spots, Male Fantasies, Settler Myths. JHU Press, 2001.
