= Hertha von Walther =

German actress (1903–1987)

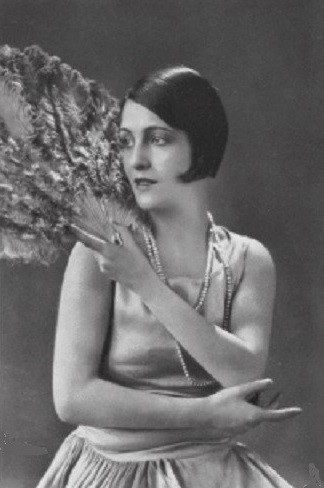
- Born: Hertha Stern und Walter von Monbary; 12 June 1903; Hildesheim, German Empire
- Died: 12 April 1987 (aged 83); Munich, West Germany
- Occupation: Actress
- Years active: 1921–1983
- Spouse(s): Paul May (m. 1935; div. 1936) Alexander Scherbina

Hertha von Walther (born Hertha Stern und Walter von Monbary; 12 June 1903 – 12 April 1987) was a German film actress. She appeared in 80 films between 1921 and 1983.

== Biography ==
Hertha von Walther was born Hertha Stern und Walther von Monbary on 12 June 1903 to Clara Stern und Walther von Monbary (née Gabain) and the Prussian general Arthur Stern und Walther von Monbary (1853–1917). Her father had been born Arthur Stern-Gwiazdowski in Poland to a mother of French descent and was the adopted son of Rudolf Walther von Monbary.

At 17 years old, von Walther left the boarding school she had been attending in Wolfenbüttel and went to the Leipzig acting school with a scholarship. Her first stage experience came at the Leipzig Opera, where she played as an extra. She later moved to Berlin and found work at the Theater am Zoo and the Renaissance Theater.

von Walther made her film debut in Destinée (1920), followed by Julot the Apache (1921), and Duke Ferrante's End (1922). She appeared as an extra in Tragedy of Love (1923), which starred Mia May, Emil Jannings, and a young Marlene Dietrich, as well as played an uncredited role in Joyless Street (1925), directed by G.W. Pabst and starring Asta Nielsen and a pre-Hollywood fame Greta Garbo.

von Walther's first major success was Mountain of Destiny (1924), which she acted in alongside Hannes Schneider, Frida Richard, and Erna Morena. She was directed by Pabst again in films such as Secrets of a Soul (1926), The Love of Jeanne Ney (1927), and The Devious Path (1928).

Other successful films von Walther appeared in include Faust (1926), The Weavers (1927), The Transformation of Dr. Bessel (1927), and Spione (1928).

von Walther successfully made the transition to talkies, and continued to appear in films in the early 1930s, among them Fritz Lang's M, in which she played as a prostitute.

In 1935, she married director Paul May, who, along with her mother, encouraged von Walther to quit acting. von Walther and May divorced in 1936, and von Walther returned to acting in minor roles, appearing in Sergeant Berry (1938) and Ich verweigere die Aussage (1938).

During World War II, von Walther participated in troop support tours throughout France, the Netherlands, and Russia. In June 1943, the Gestapo attempted to employ her as an agent, which resulted in her fleeing to the neutral country Portugal, and later to Brazil in 1948. There, she lived with her second husband, the Russian geologist Alexander Scherbina, in a remote mining region.

von Walther returned to stage acting at the Deutsche Kammerspiele in Rio de Janeiro, before returning to Germany alone in 1960. In Germany, she went on tour and continued to appear on the stage, as well as played small roles in films and television shows.

Her final screen appearance was in the TV movie Solo Run (1983).

Hertha von Walther died on 12 April 1987 in Munich.

== Selected filmography ==
- Destinée (2000)
- Julot the Apache (1921) - Zofe
- Herzog Ferrantes Ende (1922)
- At the Edge of the Great City (1922)
- Women You Rarely Greet (1922)
- The Frankish Song (1923)
- Tragödie der Liebe (1923)
- Mountain of Destiny (1924) - Hella, Tochter des Bergsteigers
- Joyless Street (1925) - Else (uncredited)
- Ways to Strength and Beauty (1925) - Mieze
- Die vom anderen Ufer (1926)
- Secrets of a Soul (1926) - Fellmans Assistentin
- Fausto (1926) - (uncredited)
- Das Geheimnis von St. Pauli (1926)
- Only a Dancing Girl (1926) - Anna Berner - Maries syster
- The Master of Death (1926) - Maja
- The Flight in the Night (1926) - Kammermädchen
- That Was Heidelberg on Summer Nights (1927) - Hertha
- The Weavers (1927) - Emma - dessen Tochter
- Eva and the Grasshopper (1927)
- Svengali (1927) - Tänzerin Sascha
- Ghost Train (1927) - Julia Price
- The Love of Jeanne Ney (1927) - Margot
- The Transformation of Dr. Bessel (1927) - Eine Miß
- Doña Juana (1928) - Doña Ines
- Ledige Mütter (1928)
- The Market of Life (1928)
- It Attracted Three Fellows (1928) - Tänzerin
- Spione (1928) - Lady Leslane
- Charlotte Somewhat Crazy (1928) - Hertha
- Man Against Man (1928) - Emita
- The Devious Path (1928) - Liane, ihre Freundin
- Number 17 (1928) - Nora Brant
- The Third Confession (1929)
- The Storyteller of Venice (1929)
- Furnished Room (1929) - Käthe
- Die Ehe (1929)
- Inherited Passions (1929)
- Osudné noci (1929)
- Once at Midnight (1929) - Kammersängerin
- The Veil Dancer (1929)
- Das Donkosakenlied (1930) - Lujbka, Geliebte des Räubers
- Helene Willfüer, Student of Chemistry (1930)
- The Tiger Murder Case (1930) - Die Ausländerin
- It Happens Every Day (1930)
- The Shot in the Sound Film Studio (1930) - Atelierbesucherin
- The Copper (1930) - Flossie (German Version)
- Ratten der Grosstadt (1930)
- Road to Rio (1931) - Marietta
- Mary (1931)
- M (1931) - Prostitute
- The Trunks of Mr. O.F. (1931) - Jeans Frau
- Teilnehmer antwortet nicht (1932) - Jockey-Lilly
- Tannenberg (1932) - Schwägerin Sonja
- The First Right of the Child (1932)
- Das erste Recht des Kindes (1932)
- Kampf um Blond (1933) - Frau Kluge
- Das Blumenmädchen vom Grand-Hotel (1934)
- So Ended a Great Love (1934)
- The Castle in Flanders (1936) - Baronin (uncredited)
- The Tiger of Eschnapur (1938) - Gast auf Fürbringers Fest
- Sergeant Berry (1938) - Juanita (uncredited)
- The Night of Decision (1938) - Mrs. Vivanco
- Ich verweigere die Aussage (1939) - Lisbeth Ottendorf
- Was wird hier gespielt? (1940)
- Der Sündenbock (1940)
- Unser kleiner Junge (1941)
- Voice of the Heart (1942) - Elisabeth
- Wild Bird (1943) - Bergsteigerin
- Küsse, die töten (1958)
- Wilder Reiter GmbH (1967)
- Jonathan (1970) - Thomas' Mutter
- Angels with Burnt Wings (1970) - Frau Kuhn
- Schulmädchen-Report 1. Teil - Was Eltern nicht für möglich halten (1970) - Woman (uncredited)
- Une femme fatale (1976) - Frau Korber
- Rosemary's Daughter (1976)
- The Serpent's Egg (1977) - Woman in street (uncredited)
- Passion Flower Hotel (1978)
