= The Shanghai Drama =

1938 film

- Film poster
- Directed by: G. W. Pabst
- Written by: Oscar-Paul Gilbert (novel); Alexandre Arnoux; Henri Jeanson; Léo Lania
- Produced by: Romain Pinès; Marc Sorkin
- Starring: Christl Mardayn; Louis Jouvet; Raymond Rouleau
- Cinematography: Curt Courant; Eugen Schüfftan
- Edited by: Louisette Hautecoeur; Jean Oser
- Music by: Ralph Erwin
- Production company: Lucia Film
- Distributed by: Compagnie Cinématographique de France
- Release date: 27 October 1938
- Running time: 105 minutes
- Country: France
- Language: French

The Shanghai Drama (French: Le drame de Shanghaï) is a 1938 French drama film directed by G. W. Pabst and starring Christl Mardayn, Louis Jouvet and Raymond Rouleau. An exiled White Russian woman works as a cabaret singer in Shanghai to support her daughter through school. The film's sets were designed by the art directors Andrej Andrejew and Guy de Gastyne. It was shot at the Joinville Studios in Paris and on location in Saigon in French Indochina.

== Cast ==
- Raymond Rouleau as Franchon
- Louis Jouvet as Ivan
- Christl Mardayn as Kay Murphy, cabaret singer
- Elina Labourdette as Nana, the nurse
- Valéry Inkijinoff as Black Dragon Agent
- Dorville as Bill, cabaret owner
- André Alerme as Mac Tavish
- Suzanne Desprès as Vera
- Gabrielle Dorziat as Superintendent of school
- Marcel Lupovici as Assassin for Black Dragon
- Robert Manuel as Le client attaqué
- PierreasLouis as Un marin américain
- LinhasNam as Cheng
- Foun-Sen as Wife of Black Dragon Agent
- Mila Parély as Dancing Girl

== See also ==
- A Countess from Hong Kong (1967)
- The White Countess (2005)

== Bibliography ==
- Kennedy-Karpat, Colleen (11 April 2013). Rogues, Romance, and Exoticism in French Cinema of the 1930s. Fairleigh Dickinson, Bloomsbury Publishing PLC. ISBN 978-1-61147-613-2.
