= Secrets of a Soul =

1926 film

- Directed by: G. W. Pabst
- Screenplay by: Colin Ross; Hans Neumann
- Produced by: Hans Neumann
- Starring: Werner Krauss
- Cinematography: Guido Seeber; Curt Oertel; Walter Robert Lach
- Music by: Giuseppe Becce
- Production company: Neumann-Film-Produktion GmbH
- Distributed by: Universum Film AG
- Release date: 24 March 1926 (Berlin)
- Running time: 75 minutes
- Country: Germany
- Languages: Silent; German intertitles

Secrets of a Soul (German: Geheimnisse einer Seele) is a 1926 silent German drama film directed by G. W. Pabst.

== Plot ==
Martin Fellman, a learned professor, experiences nightmares that make him believe he is going insane. He fears that he is on the verge of murdering his wife, who loves him dearly. He hires Dr. Orth, a psychiatrist, to help him work out his psychoses.

== Cast ==
- Werner Krauss as Martin Fellman
- Ruth Weyher as Seine Frau
- Ilka Grüning as Die Mutter
- Jack Trevor as Erich
- Pavel Pavlov as Dr. Orth (as Pawel Pawloff)
- Hertha von Walther as Fellmans Assistentin
- Renate Brausewetter as Dienstmädchen
- Colin Ross as Kriminalkommissar
- Lili Damita (uncredited)

== Production ==
Secrets of a Soul's producer Hans Neumann was a firm believer in the theories of Sigmund Freud and tried to get Freud to participate in the making of the film. Freud did not respond, so he hired Karl Abraham, a close associate of Freud's, as an adviser on the project, to help Neumann make the most psychologically realistic film possible.

The film was shot between September and November 1925, and was released in Berlin on 24 March 1926.

== Reception ==
From retrospective reviews, Tom Milne in the Monthly Film Bulletin stated the film is split into "roughly three unequal parts" commenting that the "first and best, combining psychological subtlety and stark dramatic effect in the manner that was to become Pabst's trademark, is the opening sequence" while calling the final sequence of the film a "truly hideous final sequence, a tacked-on happy ending." Milne concluded that the film sees Pabst "engaged on a trial run for the much more integrated approach to the unconscious and its aberrations which lowered in The Love of Jeanne Ney, Crisis and Pandora's Box."

Troy Howarth commented in his book Tome of Terror: Horror Films of the Silent Era that the film was "a reasonably compelling psychological thriller" and that "Krauss is too old for the part, which requires the viewer to believe that he's married to a childhood sweetheart easily 20 years younger than he is."
