= The Comedians (1941 film) =

1941 film

- German: Komödianten
- Directed by: G. W. Pabst
- Written by: Olly Boeheim; Axel Eggebrecht; Georg Wilhelm Pabst; Walter von Hollander
- Produced by: Hans Schweikart
- Starring: Käthe Dorsch; Hilde Krahl; Henny Porten
- Cinematography: Bruno Stephan
- Edited by: Ludolf Grisebach
- Music by: Lothar Brühne
- Production company: Bavaria Film
- Distributed by: Bavaria Film
- Release date: 5 September 1941
- Running time: 111 minutes
- Country: Nazi Germany
- Language: German

The Comedians (German: Komödianten) is a 1941 German historical drama film directed by G. W. Pabst and starring Käthe Dorsch, Hilde Krahl and Henny Porten. It is based on the novel Philine by Olly Boeheim. The film is set in the eighteenth century, and portrays the development of German theatre. The film was shot at the Bavaria Studios in Munich with sets designed by the art director Julius von Borsody.

== Plot ==
Karoline Neuber attempts to improve the lot of actors, who are looked down upon as vagabonds. When the Duchess refuses to let her son marry an actress, she defends them with such vehemence that she is driven from the country and finally dies in solitude.

== Cast ==
- Käthe Dorsch as Karoline Neuber
- Hilde Krahl as Philine Schröder
- Henny Porten as Amalia, Duchess of Weißenfels
- Gustav Diessl as Ernst Biron, Duke of Kurland
- Richard Häussler as Armin von Perckhammer
- Friedrich Domin as Johann Neuber
- Ludwig Schmitz as Müller, Hanswurst
- Sonja Gerda Scholz as Feigin
- Lucy Millowitsch as Lorenz
- Bettina Moissi as Victorine
- Walter Janssen as Koch, actor
- Alexander Ponto as Kohlhardt, young lover
- Viktor Afritsch as Count Paul, brother of Duchess of Weißenfels
- Kurt Müller-Graf as Studiosus Gotthold
- Harry Langewisch as Professor Gottsched
- Arnulf Schröder as Klupsch, Councilman of Leipzig
- Karin Evans as Vera
