= The Weavers (1927 film) =

1927 film

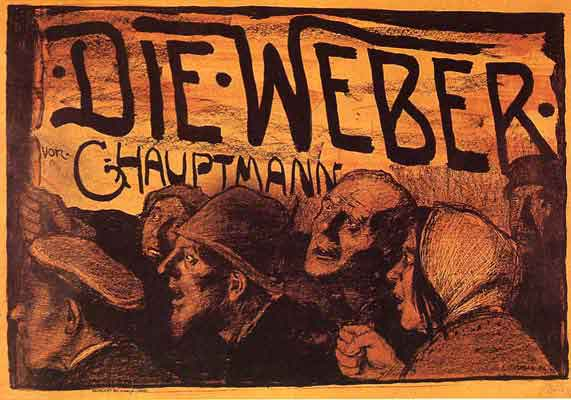
- Poster for the play on which the film is based.
- Directed by: Frederic Zelnik
- Written by: Gerhart Hauptmann (play); Fanny Carlsen; Willy Haas
- Starring: Paul Wegener; Valeska Stock; Hermann Picha; Hertha von Walther
- Cinematography: Frederik Fuglsang; Friedrich Weinmann
- Music by: Willy Schmidt-Gentner
- Production company: Zelnik-Film
- Distributed by: Deutsche Lichtspiel-Syndikat
- Release date: 14 May 1927
- Running time: 93 minutes
- Country: Germany
- Languages: Silent; German intertitles

The Weavers (German: Die Weber) is a 1927 German silent historical drama film directed by Frederic Zelnik and starring Paul Wegener, Valeska Stock and Hermann Picha. The film is based on the 1892 play of the same title by Gerhart Hauptmann based on a historical event. The film's sets were designed by the art director Andrej Andrejew.

== Synopsis ==
During the 1840s a group of Silesian weavers stage an uprising due to their concerns about the Industrial Revolution's impact of their lives.

== Cast ==
- Paul Wegener as Fabrikant Dreißiger
- Valeska Stock as Frau Dreißiger
- Hermann Picha as Baumert
- Hertha von Walther as Emma, dessen Tochter
- Camilla von Hollay as Bertha, dessen Tochter
- Arthur Kraußneck as Der alte Hilse
- Hans Heinrich von Twardowski as Gottfried Hilse, sein Sohn
- Dagny Servaes as Luise Hise, dessen Frau
- William Dieterle as Moritz Jäger
- Theodor Loos as Bäcker
- Georg John as Ansorge
- Georg Burghardt as Pastor Kittelhaus
- Hanne Brinkmann as Frau Kittelhaus
- Julius Brandt as Neumann
- Emil Lind as Expedient Pfeiffer
- Hans Stemberg as Gendarm Kutsche
- Willy Kruszinski as Polizeimeister
- Emil Biron as König Friedrich Wilhelm IV

== Bibliography ==
- Prawer, S.S. Between Two Worlds: The Jewish Presence in German and Austrian Film, 1910–1933. Berghahn Books, 2005.
