= Scandalous Eva =

1930 film

- Film poster
- Directed by: G. W. Pabst
- Written by: Heinrich Ilgenstein; Friedrich Raff; Julius Urgiß
- Produced by: Seymour Nebenzal; Henny Porten; Wilhelm von Kaufmann
- Starring: Henny Porten; Oskar Sima; Ludwig Stössel
- Cinematography: Fritz Arno Wagner
- Edited by: Marc Sorkin
- Music by: Giuseppe Becce
- Production company: Nero Film
- Distributed by: Vereinigte Star-Film
- Release date: 13 June 1930
- Running time: 96 minutes
- Country: Germany
- Language: German

Scandalous Eva (German: Skandal um Eva) is a 1930 German comedy film directed by G. W. Pabst and starring Henny Porten, Oskar Sima, and Ludwig Stössel. The film's sets were designed by the art director Franz Schroedter.

== Cast ==
- Henny Porten as Dr. Eva Rüttgers
- Oskar Sima as Dr. Kurt Hiller
- Ludwig Stössel as Dir. Rohrbach
- Paul Henckels as Prof. Hagen
- Adele Sandrock as Vulpius
- Käthe Haack as Käte Brandt
- Fritz Odemar as Lämmerberg
- Claus Clausen as Schlotterbeck
- Frigga Braut as Frau Schlotterbeck
- Karl Etlinger as Steinlechner

== Bibliography ==
- Rentschler, Eric (1990). The Films of G. W. Pabst: An Extraterritorial Cinema. New Brunswick, NJ: Rutgers University Press. ISBN 978-0-8135-1533-5.
