= They Were Twelve Women =

- The Twelve Women of the title
- Directed by: Georges Lacombe
- Written by: Yves Mirande
- Produced by: Arys Nissotti; Pierre O'Connell
- Starring: Gaby Morlay; Françoise Rosay; Micheline Presle; Betty Stockfeld
- Cinematography: Victor Arménise
- Edited by: Andrée Danis
- Music by: Marcel Lattès
- Production companies: Filmsonor; Regina Films
- Distributed by: Films EMKA
- Release date: 17 April 1940
- Running time: 80 minutes
- Country: France
- Language: French

They Were Twelve Women (French: Elles étaient douze femmes) is a 1940 French comedy film directed by Georges Lacombe and starring Gaby Morlay, Françoise Rosay and Micheline Presle. It was shot at the Buttes-Chaumont Studios in Paris. The film's sets were designed by the art director André Andrejew.

== Cast ==
- Gaby Morlay as Madame Marion
- Françoise Rosay as La duchesse de Vimeuse
- Micheline Presle as Lucie
- Betty Stockfeld as La princesse Kadikoff
- Simone Berriau as Madame Bernier
- Nina Myral as La bonne
- Simone Renant as Gaby
- Marion Delbo as Madame de Bélières
- Mila Parély as Madame de Vitrac
- Primerose Perret as Janine de Vimeuse
- Pamela Stirling as Madame de Turgis
- Blanchette Brunoy as Geneviève

== Bibliography ==
- Dayna Oscherwitz & MaryEllen Higgins. (2009) The A to Z of French Cinema. Scarecrow Press.
