= Cette nuit-là =

1933 German film directed by Marc Sorkin and G. W. Pabst

- Theatrical poster
- Directed by: Marc Sorkin; Georg Wilhelm Pabst
- Screenplay by: Henry d'Erlanger
- Based on: the play Tűzmadár (The Firebird) by Lajos Zilahy
- Produced by: Georg Wilhelm Pabst
- Starring: Lucien Rozenberg
- Cinematography: Georges Raulet; Lucien Joulin
- Music by: Jacques Célérier; Georges Célérier
- Distributed by: Pathé Consortium Cinéma
- Release date: 29 December 1933
- Running time: 80 minutes
- Country: Germany

Cette nuit-là (English: That Night) is a German crime film, directed by Marc Sorkin and Georg Wilhelm Pabst, which premiered on 29 December 1933.

== Plot summary ==
A man dies in mysterious circumstances. Following the investigation, an innocent woman, believing her daughter guilty, sacrifices herself by confessing to the murder. However, the unexpected truth is that the man committed suicide.

== Cast ==
- Lucien Rozenberg as the Divisional Commissioner
- Madeleine Soria as Mme. de Lovat
- William Aguet as Balkany
- Camille Bert as M. de Lovat
- Hubert Daix as the stage manager
- Colette Darfeuil as Yolande
- Louisa de Mornand as Mme. Demokos
- Paulette Dubost as Alice
- Pedro Elviro as Antonio
- Pierre Etchepare as the manager
- Georges Flateau as the man
- Heritza as the princess
- Mireille Séverin as Mariette
