= Marc Sorkin =

Russian-born film editor and director

- Born: 14 March 1902; Vilnius, Russian Empire
- Died: 25 February 1986 (aged 83); New York, New York, United States
- Occupations: Editor, Director
- Years active: 1924–1956 (film)

Marc Sorkin or Mark Sorkin (1902–1986) was a Russian-born film editor and director. He worked with Georg Wilhelm Pabst on a number of films as editor or assistant director.

He was born in the Lithuanian capital Vilnius which was then part of the Russian Empire. He began working in the German film industry in Berlin in the 1920s. Following the Nazi Party's takeover of power in 1933, the Jewish Sorkin left for France where he worked in that country's cinema industry. After the Invasion of France by the Germans in 1940 he left for the United States via Casablanca.

== Selected filmography ==
- Joyless Street (1925)
- The Love of Jeanne Ney (1927)
- The Devious Path (1928)
- Westfront 1918 (1930)
- Morals at Midnight (1930)
- Scandalous Eva (1930)
- Mountains on Fire (1931)
- Kameradschaft (1931)
- The Five Accursed Gentlemen (1932)
- Teilnehmer antwortet nicht (co-director: Rudolph Cartier, 1932)
- Three on a Honeymoon (1932)
- Honeymoon Trip (1933)
- Cette nuit-là (1933)
- Street of Shadows (1937)
- The Shanghai Drama (1938)
- The White Slave (1939)
- Serenade (1940)
- Pictura (1951)

== Bibliography ==
- Rentschler, Eric. The Films of G.W. Pabst: An Extraterritorial Cinema. Rutgers University Press, 1990.
