= Willy Haas =

German screenwriter

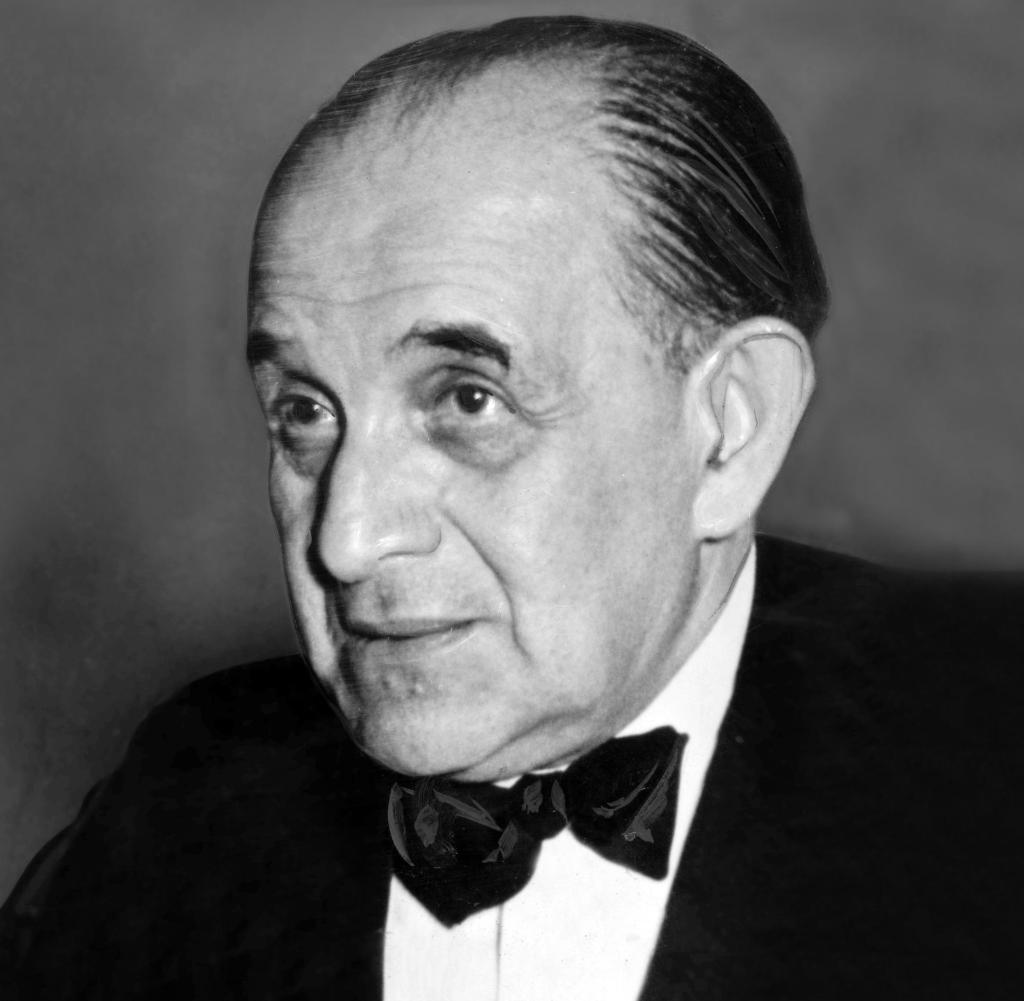
- mid-20th century
- Born: 7 June 1891; Prague, Bohemia, Austria-Hungary (now Czech Republic)
- Died: 4 September 1973 (aged 82); Hamburg, West Germany
- Occupation: Screenwriter
- Years active: 1922–1933

Willy Haas (7 June 1891 – 4 September 1973) was a German editor, film critic, and screenwriter. He wrote for 19 films between 1922 and 1933, and was a member of the jury at the 8th Berlin International Film Festival.

== Biography ==
Willy Haas was the son of a Jewish lawyer. He studied law himself, and at a young age joined a literary circle with his friends Franz Werfel, Paul Kornfeld and Johannes Urzidil. He had personal contacts with Franz Kafka and Max Brod. This circle, which met in Prague at the Café Arco, also included Ernst Polak, the husband of Milena Jesenská.

From 1911 to 1912 in Prague, the press of the Johann Gottfried Herder Association published the Herder-Blätter (Literary Journal of the Herder Association), whose editors were Willy Haas and Norbert Eisler. The journal published several essays by Haas. For the last two issues (# 4 and # 5), Otto Pick was involved. The Herder-Blätter published the work of many literary authors for the first time.

After World War I Haas went to Berlin, where he did editorial work and also worked as a screenwriter and film critic. Together with Ernst Rowohlt, he founded the weekly Die literarische Welt in 1925.

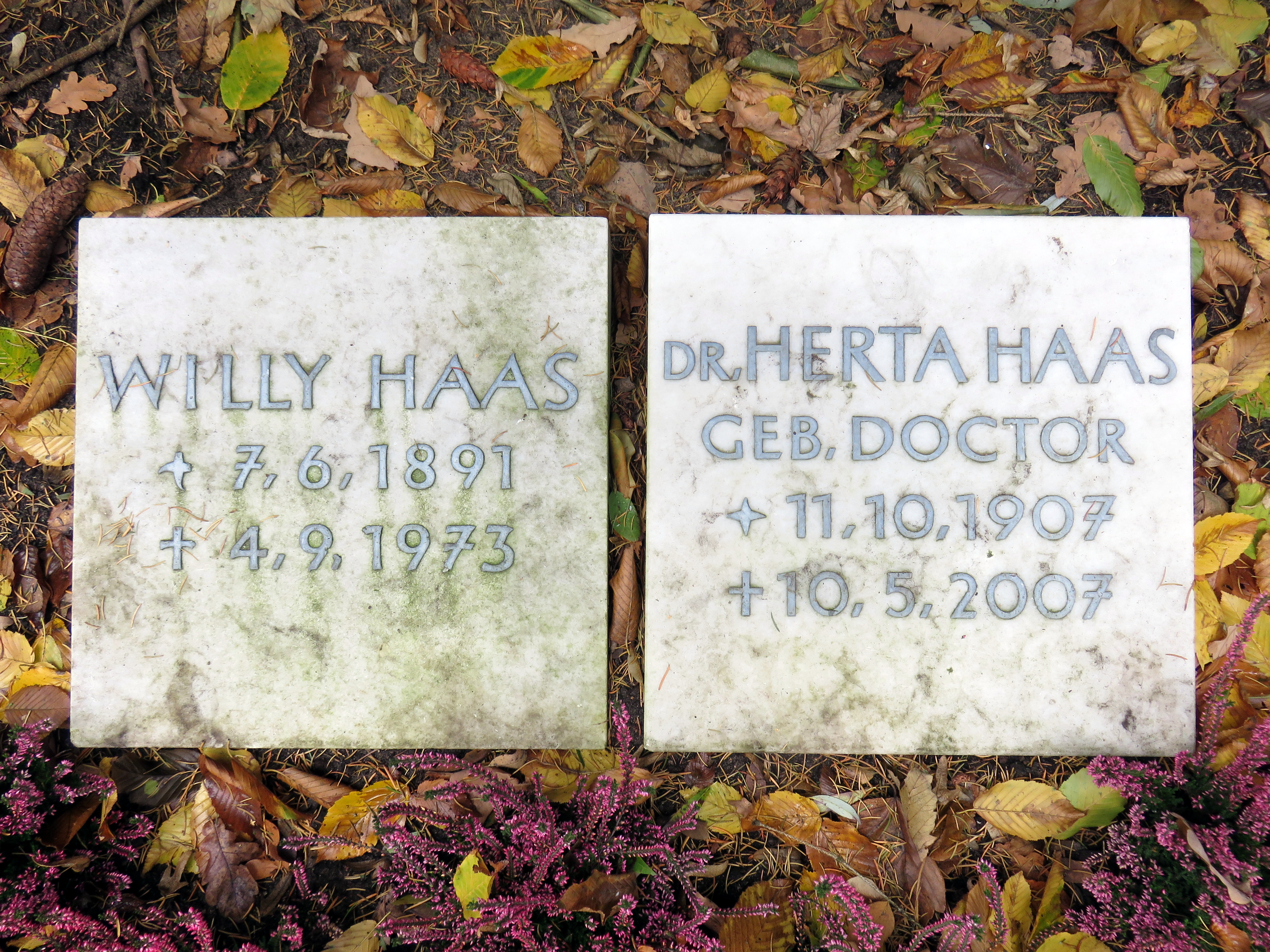
Grave of Willy Haas and Herta Haas, Ohlsdorf Cemetery

When his apartment in Berlin was repeatedly searched in 1933, he emigrated to Prague, where he worked as a newspaper editor. The literary magazine Welt im Wort (World in the Word), founded by Haas in Prague, soon ceased publication for financial reasons. After the German occupation of Prague in 1939, he went first to Italy and from there to India, where he worked as a screenwriter for at least two Indian films by Mohan Bhavnani. He also earned a salary as a censor for the British army in India. In 1948 he returned to Germany and lived in Hamburg. There he wrote for Die Welt and Welt am Sonntag, as well as for other magazines and newspapers.

Haas was married three times: from 1921 to 1925 with the translator Jarmila Ambrozova, from 1925 to 1936 with Hanna Waldeck (who gave birth to their son in 1925), and from 1947 with Herta Doctor. Willy Haas and his wife Herta were buried in Ohlsdorf Cemetery in Hamburg.

== Selected filmography ==
- The Burning Soil (1922)
- Doctor Wislizenus (1924)
- In the Name of the King (1924)
- Joyless Street (1925)
- The Girl with a Patron (1925)
- One Does Not Play with Love (1926)
- The Brothers Schellenberg (1926)
- Dancing Vienna (1927)
- The Weavers (1927)
- Mariett Dances Today (1928)
- The Beaver Coat (1928)
- Napoleon at Saint Helena (1929)
- Ways to a Good Marriage (1933)
