= Gustav Diessl =

Austrian actor (1899–1948)

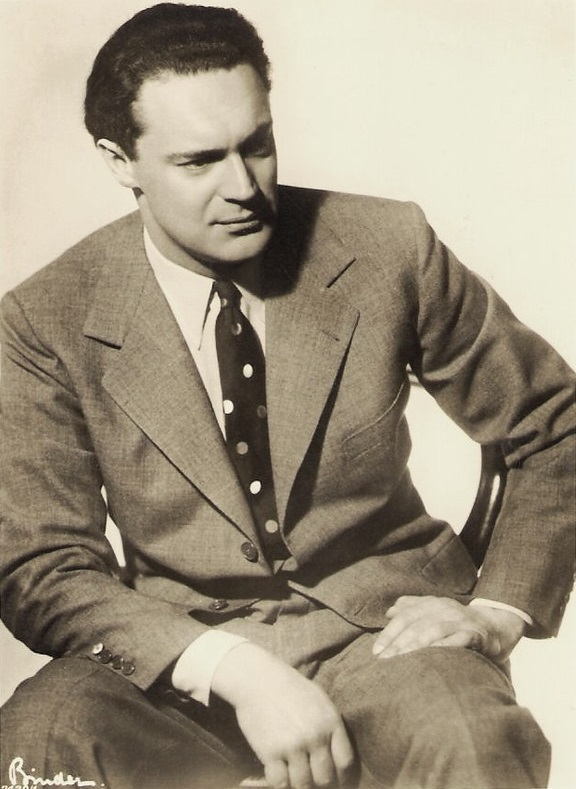
- Diessl c. 1925
- Born: Gustav Karl Balthasar Diessl; 30 December 1899; Vienna, Austria-Hungary
- Died: 20 March 1948 (aged 48); Vienna, Allied-occupied Austria
- Occupation: Actor

Gustav Diessl (30 December 1899 – 20 March 1948) was an Austrian artist, and film and stage actor.

== Biography ==
Diessl was born Gustav Karl Balthasar Diessl in Vienna. In 1916, he was an extra on different stages in Vienna but was soon recruited into the army for World War I. During his military service, he was held prisoner for a year.

After the war, Diessl started training as a stage designer but left to pursue a professional career in acting. Meanwhile, he played for a touring company and in 1921 had his first fixed engagement at the Neue Wiener Bühne. That same year he made his film debut, appearing in Im Banne der Kralle, which was produced in Austria and directed by Carl Froelich (G. W. Pabst, who would later direct Diessl in Westfront 1918, made his only appearance as a screen actor in this film). Over the years, Diessl compiled an extensive filmography, including many romantic comedies, several of which were filmed in war-time Italy. One of his more notable roles is in the German 1945 propaganda epic Kolberg, which Nazi officials designed to bolster the peoples' morale at a time when a German victory in World War II seemed increasingly hopeless.

After his first marriage ended, Diessl lived with actress Camilla Horn for several years. After this, he married a second time in 1938 to soprano Maria Cebotari. Diessl died in 1948 following two strokes.

== Selected filmography ==
- In Thrall to the Claw (1921) – Ingenieur
- Vineta, the Sunken City (1923)
- Ssanin (1924)
- The Revenge of the Pharaohs (1925) – Hussein – Kemal
- Sensations-Prozess (1928) – Dr. Spindler
- Abgründe (1928) – Thomas Beck, Lawyer
- The Devious Path (1928)
- Pandora's Box (1929) – Jack the Ripper
- The Living Corpse (1929) – Viktor Mikhajlovich Karenin
- That Murder in Berlin (1929)
- Marriage (1929)
- The Man Without Love (1929) – Mérone – ein Schauspieler
- A Mother's Love (1929) – Hans Immermann
- The White Hell of Pitz Palu (1929) – Dr. Johannes Krafft
- Women on the Edge (1929) – Robert Stevens
- Three Around Edith (1929) – Roger Brown
- Westfront 1918 (1930) – Karl
- Morals at Midnight (1930) – Brat, ein Gefangener
- Lieutenant, Were You Once a Hussar? (1930) – Fedor Karew
- Hans in Every Street (1930) – Soranzo
- The Great Longing (1930) – Himself
- The Yellow House of Rio (1931) – King-Fu / Scalpa
- Men Behind Bars (1931) – Morris
- Nights in Port Said (1932) – Seaman Hans
- Die Herrin von Atlantis (1932) – Morhange
- Teilnehmer antwortet nicht (1932) – Konrad Quandt
- Eine von uns (1932) - Martin
- Die Herrgottsgrenadiere (1932) - Faletti
- The Testament of Dr. Mabuse (1933) - Thomas Kent
- Roman einer Nacht (1933) - Der Fremde
- S.O.S. Eisberg (1933) - Professor Dr. Karl Lorenz
- Weiße Majestät (1934) - Jakob Burghardt, Bergführer
- Un de la montagne (1934) - Jacques Burgard
- Everything for a Woman (1935) - Frederic Keyne, Flugzeuginsustrieller
- Demon of the Himalayas (1935) - Dr. Norman - Ethnologe
- The Love of the Maharaja (1936) - Maharadscha
- A Woman Between Two Worlds (1936) - Dr. Hellwig
- Moscow-Shanghai (1936) - Serge Smrirnow
- Shadows of the Past (1936)
- Starke Herzen (1937) - Rittmeister Alexander von Harbin
- The Tiger of Eschnapur (1938) - Sascha Demidoff, Abenteurer
- The Indian Tomb (1938) - Sascha Demidoff, Ingenieur
- Fortsetzung folgt (1938) - Fred, sein Freund
- Rubber (1938) - Don Alonzo de Ribeira
- The Green Emperor (1939) - Henry Miller / Hendrik Mylius
- Ich verweigere die Aussage (1939) - Robert Lenart
- I Am Sebastian Ott (1939) - Strobl
- The Star of Rio (1940) - Don Felipe Escobar
- Herz ohne Heimat (1940) - Alexander Diersberg, sein Stiefbruder
- Senza cielo (1940) - Dr. Martin
- The Comedians (1941) - Ernst Biron, Count of Kurland
- Clarissa (1941) - Bankdirektor Feerenbach
- The Hero of Venice (1941) - Marco Fuser
- People in the Storm (1941) - Alexander Oswatic
- The Woman of Sin (1942)
- Maria Malibran (1943)
- Calafuria (1943) - Tommaso Bardelli
- La danza del fuoco (1943) - Giulio Boldrini
- Nora (1944) - Dr. Rank
- Mist on the Sea (1944) - Pietro Rosati
- Ein Blick zurück (1944) - Erwin Corbach
- Kolberg (1944) - Lt. Schill
- The Trial (1948) - Prosecutor Both
- The Appeal to Conscience (1949) - Dr. Gregor Karpinski (final film role)
