= Morals at Midnight =

1930 film

- Directed by: Marc Sorkin
- Written by: Hans H. Zerlett
- Produced by: Georg Wilhelm Pabst
- Starring: Gustav Diessl; Camilla Horn; Vladimir Sokoloff
- Cinematography: Frederik Fuglsang
- Production company: Hom-Film
- Distributed by: Süd-Film
- Release date: 20 June 1930
- Running time: 102 minutes
- Country: Germany
- Language: German

Morals at Midnight (German: Moral um Mitternacht) is a 1930 German romance film directed by Marc Sorkin and starring Gustav Diessl, Camilla Horn and Vladimir Sokoloff.

The film's sets were designed by Heinrich Richter.

== Cast ==
- Gustav Diessl as Brat, ein Gefangener
- Camilla Horn as Nelly Wendt
- Vladimir Sokoloff as Ein Aufseher
- Karl Falkenberg as Zweiter Aufseher
- Michael von Newlinsky as Edgar, Nellys Freund
- Lya Lys as Nora
- Drei Antonys as Drei Clowns

== Bibliography ==
- Rentschler, Eric (1990). The Films of G.W. Pabst: An Extraterritorial Cinema. Rutgers University Press. ISBN 978-0-8135-1533-5.
