= On the Streets (film) =

1933 film

- Directed by: Victor Trivas
- Written by: J.-H. Rosny aîné; Alexandre Arnoux
- Starring: Vladimir Sokoloff; Jean-Pierre Aumont; Madeleine Ozeray
- Cinematography: Rudolph Maté; Louis Née
- Music by: Hanns Eisler
- Production company: Societé Internationale Cinématographique
- Distributed by: Arthur Mayer & Joseph Burstyn (US)
- Release date: 26 July 1933
- Running time: 81 minutes
- Country: France
- Language: French

On the Streets (French: Dans les rues) is a 1933 French crime drama film directed by Victor Trivas and starring Vladimir Sokoloff, Jean-Pierre Aumont and Madeleine Ozeray. The film was based on novel of J.-H. Rosny aîné. The film's sets were designed by the art director Andrej Andrejew.

The film is also known under the title Song of the Streets, and was the first film of French actor Jean Marais.

== Synopsis ==
The plot focuses on a gang of young criminals and their redemption through the intervention of a sympathetic judge.

== Cast ==
- Jean-Pierre Aumont as Jacques
- Madeleine Ozeray as Rosalie
- Paulette Dubost as Pauline
- Vladimir Sokoloff as Father Schlamp
- Marcelle Worms as Madam Lérande
- Germaine Michel as Concierge
- Charlotte Dauvia as Jeanne
- Lucien Paris as Maurice
- Humbert as Cigare
- Roger Legris as Moutarde
- Pierre Lugan as Rosengart
- Le Petit Patachou as Moustique
- Emile Rosen as Gobiche
- François Llenas as Main Droite
- Jean Marais
- Rose-Mai

== Bibliography ==
- Crisp, Colin. French Cinema—A Critical Filmography: Volume 1, 1929–1939. Indiana University Press, 2015.
