= The Flowers of Virtue =

1942 play by Marc Connelly

The Flowers of Virtue is a 1942 play by Marc Connelly.

The action, which takes place in a single day, concerns an American businessman, Grover Bemis, who following a breakdown retires to rural southern Mexico to recuperate. But a corrupt fascist Mexican general, Orijas, gets out of jail and – backed by Nazi money – aims to set up a Hitler-like dictatorship in Mexico. His first target happens to be the village Bemis has retired to. The general and his men cripple the power plant to put the villagers at their mercy, and capture the idealistic village leader Trinidad, bringing him to a drumhead trial as a communist. Bemis slips away, impersonates the village's patron saint, manages to restore power (by what the villagers consider a miracle), and gets a message through to the local government; Trinidad is saved and the villagers turn out Orijas. Bemis gives a speech at the curtain, avowing as to how it all really was a miracle, as the good in man always fights against evil, and this is the greatest miracle of all.

The Flowers of Virtue opened on January 19, 1942, at the National Theatre in Washington, D. C. It then went on to Broadway, opening at the Royale Theatre on Broadway on February 5, 1942. Grover Bemis was played by Frank Craven, the general by Vladimir Sokoloff, and other players included Thomas Gomez, Jess Barker, Peter Beauvais, Leon Belasco, Charles Bell, and Isobel Elsom; Connelly himself directed. The Flowers of Virtue flopped, closing on February 7 after three or four performances.

Burns Mantle, drama critic of the New York Daily News, expressed dismay that the play couldn't have been saved, writing that "It had a grand idea, that of the spiritual and physical regeneration" of the protagonist and "a cast of colorful and likeable humans". According to Mantle, other reviews had been less positive, although not scathing ("the critical fraternity had congratulated [Connelly] upon the idea that inspired the play but regretted that he had not been able to inject more spirit into it"), although according to Thomas Hischak "The reviewers were dismissive and the public was not interested".

Eleanor Roosevelt attended a Washington performance and wrote in her newspaper column that she and Alexander Woollcott agreed that "the first act needed some going over. The play is increasingly good as it progresses, and the third act we thought very moving." But Billboard was much harsher ("cheap and silly melodrama... trying to cash in on a national crisis... Not content with a plot like that, Mr. Connelly has peopled it entirely with caricatures... Evidently seeing the weakness of his nonsensical fable, Mr. Connelly has tried to daub splotches of red, white, and blue paint on its crumbling stucco... tasteless effort to wrap the flag around the glaring weaknesses of the play"). Billboard did avow that the cast was generally excellent, and in a later issue singled out Thomas Gomez for the "humanity and finely effective detail of his character work" in the play while archly summarizing the work itself as one where "Marc Connelly suggested that the way to cure incipient Fascism in Mexico is to have an American business man go down there and pretend to be a venerated local saint" after (in earlier issue) dismissing it with "As for... Marc Connelley's The Flowers of Virtue, it seems silly to mention [it] in a discussion of adult drama".

At any rate, the play has apparently never been staged since its 1942 Broadway flop, nor published.
