= Alexandre Arnoux =

French screenwriter

- Born: 27 February 1884; Digne-les-Bains, Alpes-de-Haute-Provence, France
- Died: 5 January 1973 (aged 88); Paris, France
- Occupation: Writer
- Years active: 1923-1961 (film)

Alexandre Arnoux (French pronunciation: [alɛksɑ̃dʁ aʁnu]; 27 February 1884, Digne-les-Bains - 4 January 1973, Boulogne-Billancourt) was a French screenwriter and novelist.

French composer Angèle Ravizé used Arnoux’s text in her composition “Chanson.”

== Selected filmography ==
- Quatre-vingt-treize (film) (1921)
- Tillers of the Soil (1923)
- Misdeal (1928)
- The Faceless Voice (1933)
- On the Streets (1933)
- The Tunnel (1933)
- Ultimatum (1938)
- The Shanghai Drama (1938)
- The Corsican Brothers (1939)
- La Loi du Nord (1939)
- The Phantom Carriage (1939)
- First on the Rope (1944)
- The Last Days of Pompeii (1950)

== Bibliography ==
- Powrie, Phil & Rebillard, Éric. Pierre Batcheff and stardom in 1920s French cinema. Edinburgh University Press, 2009.
