= Berthold Viertel =

Austrian screenwriter and film director (1885–1953)

- Born: 28 June 1885; Vienna, Austria-Hungary
- Died: 24 September 1953 (aged 68); Vienna, Austria
- Spouse(s): Grete Viertel (m. 19??; div. 1918) Salomea Steuermann (m. 1918; div. 1947) Elisabeth Neumann (m. 1947)

Berthold Viertel (28 June 1885 – 24 September 1953) was an Austrian screenwriter and film director, known for his work in Germany, the UK and the US.

== Early career ==
Viertel was born in Vienna, the capital of the Austro-Hungarian Empire, but later went to work in Berlin. Viertel developed a reputation as a poet and theatre director, before moving into film work from 1922. As a screenwriter and director, he collaborated with some of the leading figures of the silent era of German cinema and worked on several influential films. Uneasy Money (1926) is a work of New Objectivity film movement.

He was married to screenwriter and actress Salka Viertel from 30 April 1918 to 20 December 1947.

== Arrival in America ==
Following the collapse of Viertel's theatre troupe, he faced severe financial difficulties and accepted an offer from the Fox Film Corporation. He came to Los Angeles in 1928 planning to stay for just three years. Viertel wanted to gain experience working for the booming Hollywood film industry and hoped to earn enough to return to Europe. For four years, he worked for Fox then Paramount Pictures, and Warner Brothers.

Viertel grew to intensely dislike the atmosphere in Hollywood, which he found paranoid and which he believed placed too many artistic restraints on him. Viertel wanted to produce socially relevant films and did not believe Hollywood had the capacity to do so. This came to a head when he was working on the Paramount film The Cheat (1928) and after clashing with studio bosses he was replaced by George Abbott.

== Europe ==
With the uncertain political situation in Germany in 1932, the Viertels decided to stay in the United States with their children rather than return to an uncertain future in Europe. The Viertels' house in Santa Monica Canyon was the site of salons and meetings of the Hollywood "intelligentsia" and European intellectuals. It was also an important gathering place for the émigré community.

== Personal life ==
Previously, Berthold Viertel had been married to Grete Viertel, but they divorced in 1918. After his divorce from Salka in 1947, he married for a third time, this time to Elisabeth Neumann to whom he remained married until his death in 1953.

His marriage to Salka Viertel produced three sons: Hans, Peter and Thomas. Peter Viertel (1920–2007) was a book and screenplay writer.

== Filmography ==
=== Screenwriter ===
- Nora (Germany, 1923)
- The Wig (Germany, 1925)
- 4 Devils (1928)
- City Girl (1930)
- The Sacred Flame (1931)
- Little Friend (UK, 1934)
- Das gestohlene Jahr (Austria, 1951)

=== Director ===
- Nora (Germany, 1923)
- The Wig (Germany, 1925)
- Uneasy Money (Germany, 1926)
- The One Woman Idea (1929)
- Seven Faces (1929)
- Man Trouble (1930)
- The Sacred Flame (1931)
- The Spy (1931)
- The Magnificent Lie (1931)
- The Wiser Sex (1932)
- The Man from Yesterday (1932)
- Little Friend (UK, 1934)
- The Passing of the Third Floor Back (UK, 1935)
- Rhodes of Africa (UK, 1936)

== Bibliography ==
- Bergfelder, Tim & Cargnelli, Christian (ed). Destination London: German-speaking Emigres and British Cinema, 1925-1950. Berghahn Books, 2008.
- Jansen, Irene. Berthold Viertel: Leben und künsterlerische Arbeit im Exil. New York: Peter Lang, 1992.
- Richards, Jeffrey (ed). The Unknown 1930s: An Alternative History of the British Cinema, 1929-1939. I.B. Tauris, 1998.
- Viertel, Salka. The Kindness of Strangers. New York: Holt, Rinehart, and Winston, 1969.
- Prager, Katharina. Berthold Viertel. Eine Biografie der Wiener Moderne. Wien: Böhlau 2018, ISBN 978-3-205-20503-6, online.
