= Vladimir Sokoloff =

Russian actor (1889–1962)

- Владимир Соколов
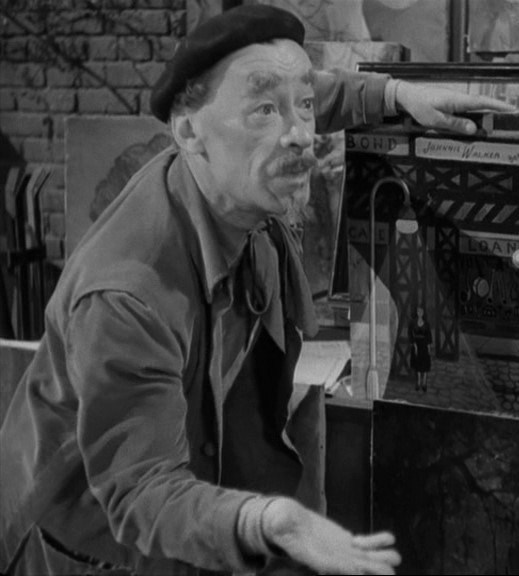
- Vladimir Sokoloff in Scarlet Street (1945)
- Born: Vladimir Aleksandrovich Sokoloff; 26 December 1889; Moscow, Russian Empire
- Died: 15 February 1962 (aged 72); West Hollywood, California, U.S.
- Other names: Wladimir Sokoloff; Waldemar Sokoloff; Wladimir Sokolow
- Occupation: Actor
- Years active: 1926–1962
- Spouse: Elizabeth Alexanderoff (m. 1922; died 1948)

Vladimir Aleksandrovich Sokoloff (Russian: Влади́мир Алекса́ндрович Соколо́в; 26 December 1889 – 15 February 1962) was a Russian actor of stage and screen. After studying theatre in Moscow, he began his professional film career in Germany and France during the Silent era, before emigrating to the United States in the 1930s. He appeared in over 100 films and television series, often playing supporting characters of various nationalities and ethnicities.

== Early life and education ==
Sokoloff was born in Moscow, Russian Empire. He was raised bilingual, speaking both Russian and German. He studied theatre in Moscow, first at the Moscow State University and later at the Russian Academy of Theatre Arts, graduating in 1913. At one point a pupil of Constantin Stanislavski, he would later reject Method acting (as well as all other acting theories).

== Career ==
Upon graduation, he joined the Moscow Art Theatre as an actor and assistant director. Later in the decade, he joined the Kamerny Theatre. In the early 1923, he toured with his troupe in Germany, where he met theatre director and producer Max Reinhardt, who invited him to stay in Berlin. He appeared in numerous stage productions, and began acting in German and Austrian films, including The Love of Jeanne Ney (1927), The Ship of Lost Souls (1929), Farewell (1930), and Darling of the Gods (1930).

With the rise of Nazism, the Jewish Sokoloff moved first to Paris in 1932, where he continued to act on stage and screen. In 1937, he emigrated to the United States. Although he spoke very little English at the time of his arrival, his first stage role there was a lead in Georg Büchner's play Danton's Death, under the direction of Orson Welles.

That same year, he had his English-language breakthrough starring in fellow expat William Dieterle's The Life of Emile Zola, portraying Paul Cézanne. He appeared in a number of Broadway plays from 1937 to 1950. He also quickly found work in American films, playing characters of a wide variety of nationalities (he himself once estimated 35), for example, Filipino (Back to Bataan), French (Passage to Marseille), Greek (Mr. Lucky), Arab (Road to Morocco), Romanian (I Was a Teenage Werewolf), and Chinese (Macao). Among his better known parts are the Spanish guerrilla Anselmo in For Whom the Bell Tolls (1943) and the Mexican Old Man in The Magnificent Seven (1960).

In the late 1950s and early 1960s, he also appeared on a number of television series, including three episodes of CBS's The Twilight Zone ("Dust", "The Gift" and "The Mirror"). On 1 January 1961, Sokoloff guest-starred as "Old Stefano", a wise shepherd, in the ABC/Warner Brothers western series Lawman, with John Russell and Peter Brown. He also appeared in one episode of The Untouchables entitled "Troubleshooter".

His final roles were in Escape from Zahrain and Taras Bulba, both of which starred Yul Brynner. Both films were released posthumously.

== Death ==
After a long career, he died of a stroke in 1962 in Hollywood, California, aged 72.

== Partial stage credits ==
| Run | Title | Role | Theatre | Refs. |
|---|---|---|---|---|
| 12/07/27 - 12/31/27 | Jedermann | Death / The Devil | Century Theatre | |
| 12/20/27 - 01/01/27 | Dantons Tod | Maximilien Robespierre | Century Theatre | |
| 01/02/28 - 01/31/28 | Peripherie | Judge | Cosmopolitan Theatre | |
| 11/02/38 - 11/19/38 | Danton's Death | Maximilien Robespierre | Mercury Theatre | |
| 02/05/42 - 02/07/42 | The Flowers of Virtue | General Orijas | Royale Theatre | |
| 12/22/47 - 01/24/48 | Crime and Punishment | Porfiry Petrovitch | National Theatre | |
| 12/27/48 - 01/07/50 | The Madwoman of Chaillot | The Prospector | Royale Theatre | |

== Filmography ==
| Year | Title | Role | Notes |
|---|---|---|---|
| 1926 | Uneasy Money | Rag Collector | |
| 1927 | Out of the Mist | Poleto | |
| 1927 | The Love of Jeanne Ney | Zacharkiewicz | |
| 1928 | The White Sonata | Dinas Vater | |
| 1929 | Sensation im Wintergarten | Berry | |
| 1929 | The Ship of Lost Souls | Grischa | |
| 1929 | Katharina Knie | Julius | |
| 1930 | Westfront 1918 | Meal Orderly | Uncredited |
| 1930 | Morals at Midnight | The Overseer | |
| 1930 | Farewell | The Baron | |
| 1930 | Darling of the Gods | Boris Jussupoff | |
| 1930 | The Flute Concert of Sanssouci | Russian Envoy | |
| 1931 | Kismet | | |
| 1931 | The Threepenny Opera | Smith, the Jailer | |
| 1931 | L'opéra de quat'sous | Smith, the Jailer | |
| 1931 | The Sacred Flame | | |
| 1931 | Hell on Earth | Lewin | |
| 1932 | L'Atlantide | Graf Bielowski | |
| 1932 | Teilnehmer antwortet nicht | Zeichner Body | |
| 1932 | Strafsache von Geldern | | |
| 1932 | Haunted People | | |
| 1933 | Don Quichotte | Gypsy King | |
| 1933 | Don Quixote | Servant | Uncredited |
| 1933 | On the Streets | Father Schlamp | |
| 1933 | High and Low | Monsieur Berger | |
| 1934 | Lake of Ladies | Baron Dobbersberg | |
| 1934 | Count Woronzeff | Petroff | |
| 1935 | Le secret des Woronzeff | Petroff | |
| 1935 | Napoléon Bonaparte | Trista Fleuri | |
| 1936 | Mayerling | The Chief of Police | |
| 1936 | Under Western Eyes | Rector | |
| 1936 | Compliments of Mister Flow | Merlow | |
| 1936 | The Lower Depths | Kostylev | |
| 1937 | The Life of Emile Zola | Paul Cézanne | |
| 1937 | Alcatraz Island | The Flying Dutchman | |
| 1937 | Conquest | Dying Soldier | |
| 1937 | West of Shanghai | Chow Fu-Shan | |
| 1937 | Expensive Husbands | Andrew Brenner | |
| 1937 | Beg, Borrow or Steal | Sascha | |
| 1937 | Tovarich | | Scenes deleted |
| 1938 | Arsène Lupin Returns | Ivan Pavloff | |
| 1938 | Blockade | Basil | |
| 1938 | The Amazing Dr. Clitterhouse | Popus | |
| 1938 | Spawn of the North | Dimitri | |
| 1938 | Ride a Crooked Mile | Glinka | |
| 1939 | Juarez | Camilo | |
| 1939 | Sons of Liberty | Jacob | Short; uncredited |
| 1939 | The Real Glory | The Datu | |
| 1940 | Comrade X | Michael Bastakoff | |
| 1941 | Love Crazy | Dr. Klugle | |
| 1942 | Crossroads | Carlos Le Duc | Uncredited |
| 1942 | Road to Morocco | Hyder Khan | |
| 1943 | Mission to Moscow | President Mikhail Kalinin | |
| 1943 | Mr. Lucky | Greek Priest | Uncredited |
| 1943 | For Whom the Bell Tolls | Anselmo | |
| 1944 | Song of Russia | Alexander Meschkov | |
| 1944 | Passage to Marseille | Grandpère | |
| 1944 | Till We Meet Again | Cabeau | |
| 1944 | The Conspirators | Miguel | |
| 1945 | A Royal Scandal | Malakoff | |
| 1945 | Back to Bataan | Señor Buenaventura J. Bello | |
| 1945 | Paris Underground | Undertaker | |
| 1945 | Scarlet Street | Pop LeJon | |
| 1946 | Two Smart People | Monsieur Jacques Dufour | |
| 1946 | A Scandal in Paris | Uncle Hugo | |
| 1946 | Cloak and Dagger | Polda | |
| 1948 | To the Ends of the Earth | Commissioner Lum Chi Chow | |
| 1950 | The Baron of Arizona | Pepito | |
| 1952 | Macao | Kwan Sum Tang | |
| 1956 | While the City Sleeps | George "Pop" Pilski | |
| 1957 | Istanbul | Aziz Rakim | |
| 1957 | Monster from Green Hell | Dr. Lorentz | |
| 1957 | I Was a Teenage Werewolf | Pepe the Janitor | |
| 1957 | Sabu and the Magic Ring | Old Fakir | |
| 1958 | Twilight for the Gods | Feodor Morris | |
| 1960 | Man on a String | Sergei Mitrov | |
| 1960 | Beyond the Time Barrier | The Supreme | |
| 1960 | The Magnificent Seven | The Old Man | |
| 1960 | Cimarron | Jacob Krubeckoff | |
| 1961 | Mr. Sardonicus | Henryk Toleslawski | |
| 1962 | Escape from Zahrain | Abdul | Uncredited; posthumous release |
| 1962 | Taras Bulba | Old Stepan | Posthumous release |

== Television credits ==
| Year | Title | Role | Episodes |
|---|---|---|---|
| 1955 | Crusader | Grandfather | "The Bargain" |
| 1956 | The Millionaire | Uncle Jacques Monet | "The Story of Lucky Swanson" |
| 1957 | Wire Service | Prime Minister | "No Peace in Lo Dao" / "A Matter of Conscience" |
| 1957 | Cavalcade of America | Jake Bartosh | "The Last Signer" |
| 1957 | Suspicion | Enrique Bartolo | "The Flight" |
| 1957 | Have Gun – Will Travel | Gourken | "Helen of Abajinian" |
| 1957-1959 | Playhouse 90 | Bartok / Anselmo | "For I Have Loved Strangers" / "For Whom the Bell Tolls", parts 1 and 2 |
| 1958 | Alfred Hitchcock Presents | Uncle Fernaud | Season 3 Episode 22: "The Return of the Hero" |
| 1958 | Father Knows Best | Man | "The Great Experiment" |
| 1959 | Peter Gunn | Victor Majeski | "Edge of the Night" |
| 1959 | Johnny Staccato | Father Keeley | "Nature of the Night" |
| 1959 | Sunday Showcase | Dr. Alexis Rostov | "Murder and the Android" |
| 1960 | Five Fingers | Peter Vestos | "The Judas Goat" |
| 1960 | Tightrope! | Emile Kovacs | "Cold Ice" |
| 1960 | The Alaskans | Chanook | "Peril at Caribou Crossing" |
| 1960 | Dick Powell's Zane Grey Theatre | Alf | "Knife of Hate" |
| 1960 | Lawman | Old Stefano | "Old Stefano" |
| 1960-1961 | The Untouchables | Stanley Tannenbaum / Sam | "The Tommy Karpeles Story" / "The Troubleshooter" |
| 1961 | The Law and Mr. Jones | Dr. Harding | "Lethal Weapons" |
| 1961 | Hennesey | Papa Bronsky | "Max Remembers Papa" |
| 1961 | Maverick | Pedro Rubio | "The Forbidden City" |
| 1961 | The Donna Reed Show | Dr. Steinhaus | "Donna's Helping Hand" |
| 1961 | Death Valley Days | Tarabal | "The Stolen City" |
| 1961 | Adventures in Paradise | Sada | "Adam San" |
| 1961 | Harrigan and Son | Kowalski | "The Legacy" |
| 1961 | Wagon Train | Felipe | "The Don Alvarado Story" |
| 1961 | The Rifleman | Abuelito | "The Vaqueros" |
| 1961 | Whispering Smith | Father Antonio | "Prayer of a Chance" |
| 1961 | Checkmate | Pedro Moreno | "Juan Moreno's Body" |
| 1961-1962 | Thriller | Papa Glockstein / The Janitor | "The Terror in Teakwood" / "Flowers of Evil" |
| 1961-1962 | The Twilight Zone | Gallegos / Father Tomas / Guitarist | "Dust" / "The Mirror" / "The Gift" |
| 1962 | The Dick Powell Show | Marco | "Death in a Village" |
| 1962 | Hawaiian Eye | Dr. Anton Miklos | "The Missile Rogues" |
