= Uneasy Money (1926 film) =

1926 film

Die Abenteuer eines Zehnmarkscheines
- Directed by: Berthold Viertel
- Written by: Béla Balázs
- Produced by: German Club Film AG (DEFA German Fox)
- Starring: Mary Nolan; Oskar Homolka; Werner Fuetterer
- Release date: 28 October 1926
- Countries: Germany, United States
- Language: Silent

Die Abenteuer eines Zehnmarkscheines (K. 13513), also known as Adventures of a Ten Mark Note and Uneasy Money, is a German silent film directed by Berthold Viertel. It was released in 1926. This film is considered lost.

== Cast ==
- Mary Nolan as Anna - ihre Tochter
- Oskar Homolka as Direktor Haniel
- Werner Fuetterer as Andreas, Anna's freund und nachbar
- Maly Delschaft as Ein Stubenmädchen
- Francesco von Mendelssohn as Ein Klavierspieler
- Walter Frank as Robert, ihr Sohn
- Harald Paulsen as Fritz
- Iwa Wanja as Frieda
- Ressel Orla as Frau Hamel, seine Frau
- Otto Wallburg as Herr Fischer
- Karl Etlinger as Ein Chauffeur
- Vladimir Sokoloff as Ein Lumpensammler
- Margo Lion as Ein Bufettdame
- Luise Morland as Eine Zimmervermieterin
- Julius Hermann as Der Hauswirt
- Geza L. Weiss as Eir Bierjunge
