= Accident (1928 film) =

1928 film

- German: Polizeibericht Überfall
- Directed by: Ernő Metzner
- Written by: Grace Chiang; Ernő Metzner
- Cinematography: Eduard von Borsody
- Release date: 1928
- Running time: 21 minutes
- Country: Weimar Republic
- Language: German

Accident (German: Polizeibericht Überfall) is a 1928 German short film directed by Ernő Metzner.

== Plot ==
Accident (1928)

The film centers on the struggles of a German citizen who happens upon a counterfeit coin lying in a gutter. The opening sequence of the movie gives a brief glimpse into the notion that the coin might be "cursed," as another passerby is struck down by a car while reaching for the coin in the middle of the road. Although the finder of the coin is at first glad, he soon regrets ever having picked it up.

== Cast ==
- Heinrich Gotho
- Eva Schmid-Kayser
- Sybille Schmitz
- Alfred Loretto
- Han Ruys
- Rudolf Hilberg
- Heinrich Falconi
