= High and Low (1933 film) =

1933 film

- Directed by: G. W. Pabst
- Written by: Ladislaus Bus-Fekete (play); Anna Gmeyner (screenplay); Georges Dolley (dialogue)
- Starring: Ariane Borg
- Cinematography: Eugen Schüfftan
- Edited by: Jean Oser
- Music by: Marcel Lattès
- Distributed by: Films Sonores Tobis
- Release date: 8 December 1933
- Running time: 79 minutes
- Country: France
- Language: French

High and Low (French: Du haut en bas) is a 1933 French drama film directed by G. W. Pabst. It adapts a play (Du haut en bas) by Ladislaus Bus-Fekete.

== Cast ==
In alphabetical order

- Ariane Borg as (as Olga Muriel)
- Pauline Carton as Seamstress
- Janine Crispin as Marie de Ferstel (as Jeannine Crispin)
- Christiane Delyne
- Pedro Elviro as Bretzel, the sweeper
- Jean Gabin as Charles Boulla
- Catherine Hessling as Girl in Love
- Margo Lion as Mme Binder, the landlord
- Peter Lorre as Beggar
- Milly Mathis as Poldi
- Mauricet as M. Binder
- Michel Simon as M. Bodeletz
- Vladimir Sokoloff as M. Berger

== Reception ==
High an Low, described as a "realistic and social film about the life of the inhabitants of a block of flats in Vienna" was said to remain between two worlds, Austria and France.
