= Joyless Street =

1925 film by Georg Wilhelm Pabst

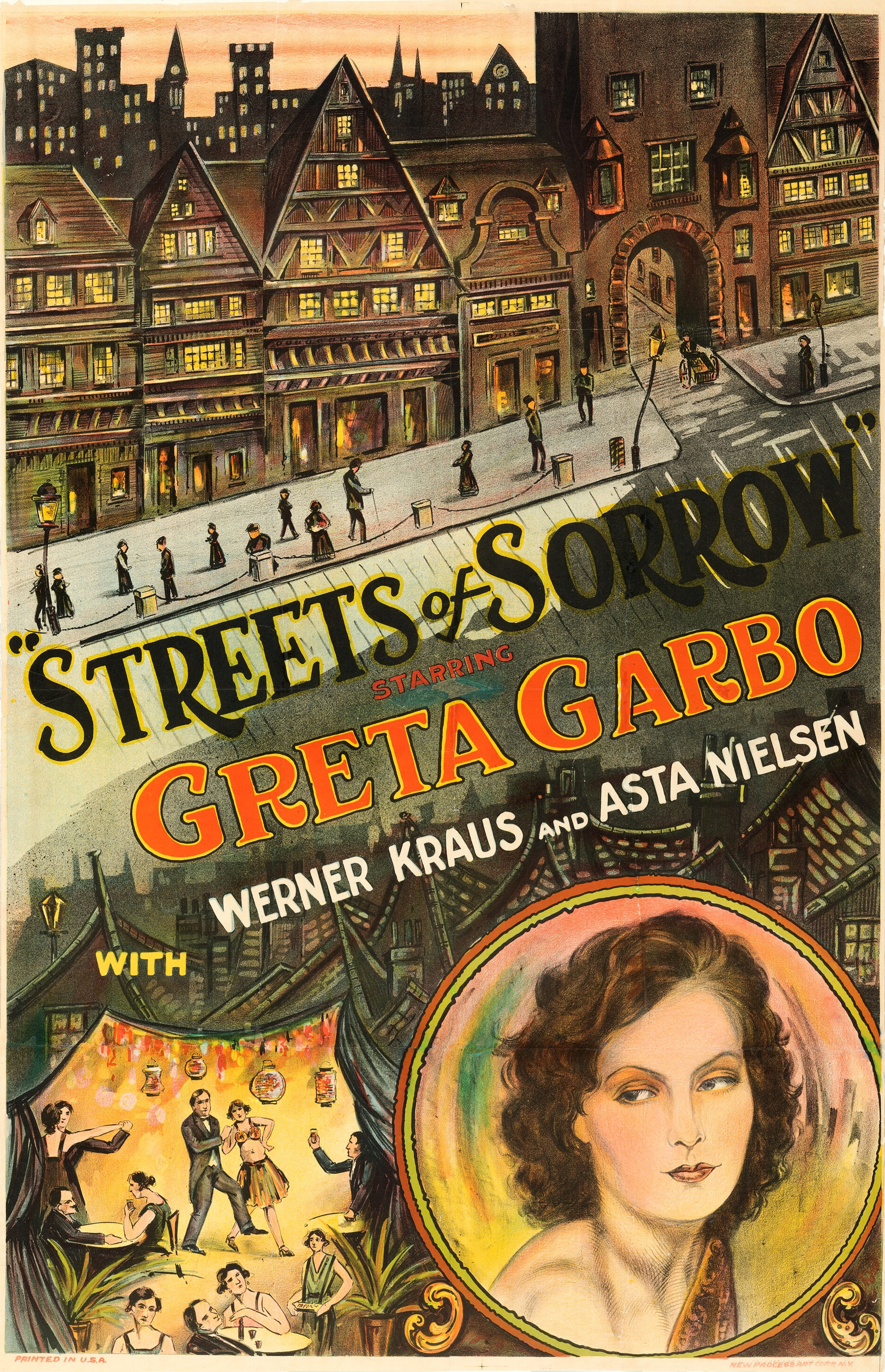
- American theatrical release poster
- Die freudlose Gasse
- Directed by: Georg Wilhelm Pabst
- Written by: Willy Haas
- Based on: Die freudlose Gasse by Hugo Bettauer
- Produced by: Michael Salkin; Romain Pinès
- Starring: Greta Garbo; Asta Nielsen; Werner Krauss; Loni Nest; Jaro Fürth; Agnes Esterhazy
- Cinematography: Guido Seeber; Curt Oertel; Walter Robert Lach
- Edited by: Mark Sorkin
- Production company: Sofar-Film-Produktion GmbH
- Distributed by: Sofar-Film-Produktion GmbH
- Release date: 18 May 1925 (Germany)
- Running time: 151 minutes (restored version)
- Country: Germany
- Languages: Silent film; German intertitles

Joyless Street (German: Die freudlose Gasse), also titled The Street of Sorrow or The Joyless Street, is a 1925 German silent film directed by Georg Wilhelm Pabst starring Greta Garbo, Asta Nielsen and Werner Krauss. It is based on a novel by Hugo Bettauer and widely considered an expression of New Objectivity in film.

== Plot ==
In an alley called Melchiorgasse in a poor quarter of 1921 Vienna, Austria, the lives of several people coincide. Marie, daughter of an abusive war veteran father, hopes to escape her home with the help of her boyfriend Egon, a bank clerk. Grete is the elder daughter of impoverished civil servant Rumfort. Marie and Grete join the overnight line of waiting customers outside of the butcher's shop run by the abusive Josef Geiringer, but Grete passes out and loses her place. Marie and her friend Else manage to enter Geiringer's shop, where they receive a piece of meat in exchange for Else's sexual services. Else offers Marie to share the meat with her, but Marie declines, knowing that Else, whose husband is unemployed, has a young child to feed.

Marie runs away from home and asks Egon to take her in, but Egon, who is entangled with two women of Vienna's high society, hoping that they will help him climb up the social ladder, declines. With the help of Mrs. Greifer, owner of a fashion boutique and a night club, Marie becomes the mistress of Canez, a speculator on the stock exchange market. During a date with Canez, she witnesses Egon meeting with Mrs. Leid, one of his female acquaintances. When Mrs. Leid is later found strangled, Marie states that she saw Egon commit the murder.

Meanwhile, Rumfort loses his pension in a share transaction in which Canez was involved, while Grete is dismissed from her job for rejecting her employer's sexual advances. To pay for their expenses, the Rumfort family offers a room to let to American Red Cross officer Davy, who is enamoured with Grete's charms. When Davy's adjutant accuses Grete's younger sister of stealing from their supplies, Grete's father insists that they leave. Grete borrows money from Mrs. Greifer, who in turn tries to talk Grete into working for her.

Out of bad conscience, Marie confesses to the police that it was she who murdered Mrs. Leid, and that she falsely accused Egon out of jealousy. When Davy witnesses Grete during a nightclub event, he scolds her for her amorality, but forgives her when he learns from her father that she only participated to save her family from starving. Outside of the nightclub, the Melchiorgasse residents have gathered and start throwing stones through the windows. Else kills Geiringer after he refuses to deliver her more meat. When the house where she lives with her husband and child catches fire, the couple manage to save their child before they both die in the flames.

== Cast ==
- Jaro Fürth as Councilor Rumfort
- Greta Garbo as Grete Rumfort
- Loni Nest as Mariandl Rumfort
- Asta Nielsen as Marie Lechner
- Max Kohlhase as Marie's father
- Sylvia Torf as Marie's mother
- Karl Etlinger as Max Rosenow
- Ilka Grüning as Frau Rosenow
- Agnes Esterhazy as Regina Rosenow
- Alexander Murski as Dr. Leid
- Tamara Tolstoi as Lia Leid
- Henry Stuart as Egon Stirner
- Robert Garrison as Canez
- Einar Hanson as Lt. Davy
- Mario Cusmich as Colonel Irving
- Valeska Gert as Frau Greifer
- Gräfin Tolstoi as Fräulein Henriette
- Edna Markstein as Frau Merkl
- Werner Krauss as Geiringer, the butcher
- Hertha von Walther as Else
- Otto Reinwald as Else's husband
- Gregori Chmara as Pjotr Orlow, waiter
- M. Raskatoff as Trebitsch
- Krafft-Raschig as American soldier
- Renate Brausewetter as woman (uncredited)
- Maria Forescu as woman (uncredited)
- Lya Mara as woman (uncredited)
- Iván Petrovich as man (uncredited)

== Production ==
Screenwriter Willy Haas recalled in his memoirs that Pabst rang him up in 1924, asking him to read Bettauer's novel, which Pabst thought would make for a good film story. Haas read the book, which he regarded an awful crime potboiler ("Reißer"). He and Pabst agreed that the social aspect should be emphasised, "the strident imagery of the inflation, the bankruptcy of civil servants and academics, the corruption, the moral decay" (Haas), while the criminalistic aspect should be cast aside. The film's sets were designed by the art directors Otto Erdmann and Hans Sohnle, Mark Sorkin served as assistant director and editor.

== Release history ==
Shortly after its release, different versions of the film circulated because of censorship cuts. One US release version was shortened to one hour running time, omitting the Asta Nielsen storyline. Between 1995 and 1998, with the help of international archives, the Munich Film Archive restored the film to its current length of 151 minutes, which is still approx. half an hour shorter than the original version. A region 2 DVD version with documentary extras is available.

The film was exhibited in the US as The Street of Sorrow and in the UK as The Joyless Street.

== Reception and legacy ==
In her 1955 book Die dämonische Leinwand (engl. The Haunted Screen), German film historian Lotte H. Eisner criticised the film's studio sets, Expressionist lightning and formulaic depiction of poverty: "everything is artificial, too condensed, too symbolically accentuated". Rudolf Thome, reviewing Joyless Street for the Süddeutsche Zeitung in 1964, disagreed with this view, calling it "Pabst's masterpiece", whose scenes do not represent ideas and whose images only conveye the meaning of what can actually be seen.

30 years after Eisner, critic Pauline Kael titled Joyless Street an "extraordinary triumph of cinematography and Expressionist design", which despite its weak parts "makes a very strong visual impression". Dave Kehr, writing for the Chicago Reader in 1985, was more reserved, calling it "heavy going" and "an official classic that hasn't quite earned the title". In a list of the 100 most important German films, compiled in 1994 by the Association of German Cinémathèques, Joyless Street was placed at #9.
