= The Love of Jeanne Ney =

1927 film by Georg Wilhelm Pabst

- Directed by: Georg Wilhelm Pabst
- Screenplay by: Ilya Ehrenburg; Ladislaus Vajda; Rudolf Leonhard
- Based on: Ljubov' Žanny Nej by Ilya Ehrenburg
- Starring: Édith Jéhanne; Brigitte Helm; Hertha von Walther; Uno Henning
- Cinematography: Fritz Arno Wagner; Walter Robert Lach
- Edited by: Georg Wilhelm Pabst; Mark Sorkin
- Music by: Hans May (premiere)
- Production company: UFA
- Distributed by: Parufamet
- Release date: 6 December 1927 (Germany)
- Running time: 107 mins. (Germany); 86 mins. (US) (Note: Running times taken from the German and US versions on the Blu-ray releases by Kino (2020) and Eureka Masters of Cinema (2021).)
- Country: Germany
- Languages: Silent film; German intertitles

The Love of Jeanne Ney (German: Die Liebe der Jeanne Ney), released as Lusts of the Flesh in the United Kingdom, is a 1927 German silent drama film directed by Georg Wilhelm Pabst based on a novel by Ilya Ehrenburg.

== Plot ==
The German (left) and U.S. (right) versions of The Love of Jeanne Ney

Jeanne is the daughter of André Ney, a French diplomat and political observer in Crimea during the Russian Revolution. To finance his excessive, decadent lifestyle, Khalibiev sells Ney a list with names of alleged Bolshevik agents. Jeanne's lover, Andreas Labov, and one of his Bolshevik comrades show up in her father's office, demanding that Ney hands over the list. Ney shoots at the intruders and is shot dead in return. Soon after, the revolutionary army storms the city. Jeanne flees to Paris with the help of a Bolshevik officer, who secretly gives Andreas her address.

In Paris, Jeanne takes up a job as a secretary at her uncle Raymond's detective agency. Khalibiev, who followed her to Paris, sets about seducing Raymond's blind daughter Gabrielle, planning to murder her after their marriage and run away with her money. Margot, a young woman working at a bar whom Khalibiev told of his plan, warns Gabrielle and Raymond. Andreas, who has been sent to Paris as a political agitator, reunites with Jeanne and spends the night with her at a hotel.

Khalibiev sneaks into Raymond's office, murders him and steals a diamond which had been declared missing and found by one of Raymond's employees. He frames Andreas by leaving behind Andreas' coat and photo. Andreas is arrested by the police, appearing all the more suspicious due to the money he has been carrying for his agitational work.

When Jeanne learns of Andreas' arrest, she looks for Khalibiev to help clear Andreas of the charges brought against him, as they ran into one another on the night of the murder. She boards the train Khalibiev took to flee the city, trying to convince him to testify on Andreas' behalf. Khalibiev makes sexual advances to her and attempts to silence her with his handkerchief, exposing the stolen diamond. Jeanne cries for help, and Khalibiev is arrested. Inside the diamond, Jeanne sees an image of Andreas being released from prison.

== Cast ==
- Édith Jéhanne as Jeanne Ney
- Uno Henning as Andreas Labov
- Fritz Rasp as Khalibiev
- Brigitte Helm as Gabrielle
- Adolf E. Licho as Raymond Ney
- Eugen Jensen as André Ney
- Hans Jaray as Poitras
- Sig Arno as Gaston
- Hertha von Walther as Margot
- Vladimir Sokoloff as Zacharkiewicz
- Jack Trevor as Mr. Jack
- Mammey Terja-Basa as servant
- Josefine Dora
- Heinrich Gotho
- Margarete Kupfer
- Robert Scholz

== Production and release ==
The Love of Jeanne Ney was shot at the UFA film studios in Babelsberg and on location in Paris. For reasons of authenticity, Pabst had the partying White Russians in the opening sequence played by actual White Russian expatriates. Ehrenburg, initially excited about the opportunity to work with Pabst, whose films he held in esteem, was soon disappointed to find that the director was more concerned with set details than the "absurdity" (Ehrenburg) of the script. Protesting in vain against Pabst's changes to his original work (including a happy ending not in the book), he tried to have his name removed from the titles, condemning the resulting film for its philistine morals, such as having communist Andreas kneel in front of the holy virgin. After Alfred Hugenberg had acquired the producing company UFA, more changes were demanded against Pabst's will, including the almost complete deletion of the scene with Jeanne and Andreas spending the night at the hotel.

The Love of Jeanne Ney premiered in Berlin on 6 December 1927. It was released by Parufamet, a joint distribution company by UFA, Paramount Pictures and Metro-Goldwyn-Mayer. For the American release version, 20 minutes were cut from the film and, in certain scenes, different camera angles used.

Because the film negatives of both the German and US version are lost, HD restorations were made based on negative duplicates and prints. The German version was restored in 2016 from a duplicate made by the Museum of Modern Art in the 1930s, the US version from a German archive copy. The restored German version was first screened with live music at the UFA Filmnächte in Berlin in August 2017 and premiered on Arte TV the following month. It was released on home media in Germany, the US and the UK between 2018 and 2021.

== Reception and legacy ==
Initial reactions to The Love of Jeanne Ney were mixed. Shortly after the film's premiere, Edmund Meisel, composer of the scores of Battleship Potemkin and other films of the era, wrote a letter to Sergei Eisenstein in which he called the film's changes to the novel, apart from moments of unintentional humour, "not funny but profoundly sad". Kenneth MacPherson, co-editor of film magazine Close Up, gave The Love of Jeanne Ney coverage in several issues, rating it superior to Pabst's Joyless Street for being "more complete" and "dynamic" and calling Édith Jéhanne's performance "admirable". MacPherson had been shown Pabst's original cut in Berlin before the film's release and gave the director the opportunity to explain his technique of editing on actors' movements.

Shortly after World War II, film historian Siegfried Kracauer noted in his book From Caligari to Hitler, "The Love of Jeanne Ney exceeds [Pabst's] Joyless Street not only in scope of vision, but in the determination with which it records reality". Kracauer nonetheless commented negatively on the production company's deletion of all provoking political and moral content of the source material.

For James Monaco (writing in 1991), The Love of Jeanne Ney "marked an important advance in Pabst's technique". His rapid cutting on movement "foreshadowed the dialogue cutting of sound film" and adds to the "surprisingly modern" appearance of his silent films. Reflecting on Pabst's filmography in his 2006 essay for the Criterion Collection, J. Hoberman rated The Love of Jeanne Ney as one of "the culminating works of silent cinema", being "an ambitious attempt to synthesize Soviet montage, Hollywood action-melodrama, and German mise-en-scène."
