= Don Quixote (1933 film) =

1933 film by Georg Wilhelm Pabst

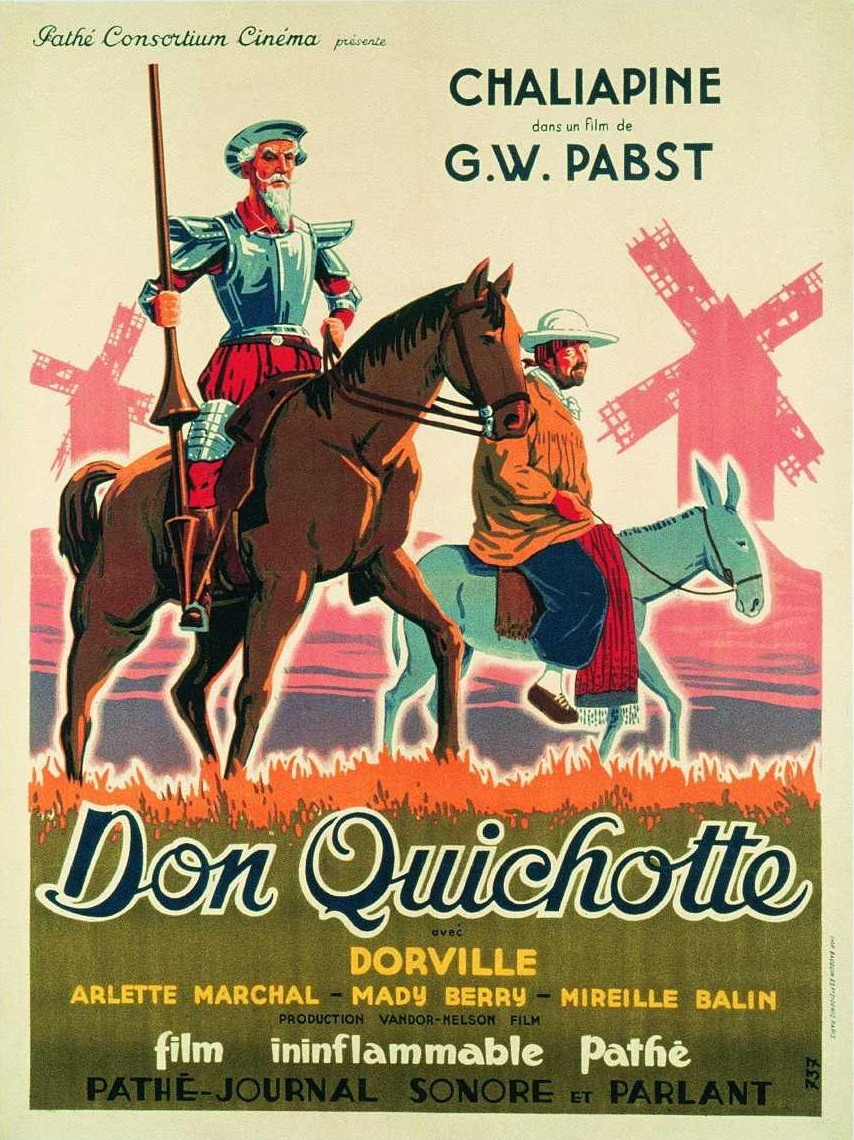
- Directed by: G. W. Pabst
- Written by: Alexandre Arnoux; Paul Morand; John Farrow (English version)
- Based on: Don Quixote by Miguel de Cervantes
- Produced by: G. W. Pabst; Nelson Vandor
- Starring: Feodor Chaliapin; George Robey; Oscar Asche; Emily Fitzroy
- Cinematography: Nicolas Farkas
- Music by: Jacques Ibert
- Distributed by: United Artists
- Release dates: 25 May 1933 (London); 23 December 1934 (U.S.)
- Running time: 73 minutes
- Countries: France; United Kingdom

Don Quixote (1933) is a British-French film adaptation of the classic Miguel de Cervantes novel, directed by Georg Wilhelm Pabst, starring the famous operatic bass Feodor Chaliapin. Although the film stars Chaliapin, it is not an opera. However, he does sing four songs in it. It is the first sound film version of the Spanish classic. The supporting cast in the English version includes George Robey, René Donnio, Miles Mander, Lydia Sherwood, Renée Valliers, and Emily Fitzroy. The film was made in three versions—French, English, and German—with Chaliapin starring in all three versions.

The producers separately commissioned five composers (Jacques Ibert, Maurice Ravel - who wrote three songs -, Marcel Delannoy, Manuel de Falla and Darius Milhaud) to write the songs for Chaliapin. Each composer believed only he had been approached.

Ibert's music was chosen for the film, but this caused him some embarrassment as he was a close friend of Ravel's. Ravel considered a lawsuit against the producers. He dropped the action, and the two composers remained close friends. EMI released excerpts from the soundtrack of the French version on 78-rpm and LP discs.

== Changes to plot ==
The film condenses the novel significantly and scrambles up the order of Don Quixote's adventures. There are several changes. Don Quixote is "dubbed" a knight not by an innkeeper, but by a traveling actor who is appearing as a king in a play that Don Quixote mistakenly believes to be real. As in the later 1957 Russian film version of the novel, the attack on the windmills is moved to near the end of the film. The mill workers are seen returning from their labor, and unlike the novel, Don Quixote is caught up by the windmill but not thrown. The windmill is stopped by the mill workers, who then assist Sancho in carrying Quixote down.

The final scene is the most radically changed of all. Totally defeated, and brought home imprisoned in a cage, Don Quixote sees that his niece, the village priest, and Sanson Carrasco (who in this version is the niece's fiancee, as in Man of La Mancha) have burnt his beloved books of chivalry. The shock literally kills Don Quixote; he collapses and dies in Sancho's arms, while the townsfolk, who only a few moments prior, were laughing and jeering at him as he sat in the cage, are deeply moved and now kneel in respect for the dead "knight". In a bit of trick photography, the pages of the original 1605 edition of Cervantes's novel arise from the flames rather than being consumed by them - a sign that Don Quixote has achieved immortality.

Dulcinea, who appears in the film, is depicted as a not-too-bright milkmaid, and cruelly, she is among those who laugh the hardest when Don Quixote is brought back in a cage.

Don Quixote's name is Don Quixote in this version. He is never referred to as Alonso Quixano.

== Trick photography in the film ==
The film makes several striking early uses of trick photography. Immediately after the opening credits, we see a page of a medieval romance, and the figures on it seem to come to animated life. (This is deleted on some prints.) The windmill sequence, in which Don Quixote is lifted into the air by the sails, gives the impression that Chaliapin himself has been caught up by the windmill, not a dummy or a stunt double. It is an impressive achievement by 1933 standards, and was imitated both in the 1957 screen version of Cervantes' novel and in the 1972 film version of Man of La Mancha. And the scene in which the pages of the novel seemingly arise from the flames has already been mentioned.

== Cannes ==
The film was screened out of competition at the 1987 Cannes Film Festival.

The French and English versions were released on DVD on 30 May 2006 by Video Artists International.

== Cast ==
- Feodor Chaliapin as Don Quixote
- George Robey as Sancho Panza
- René Donnio as Carrasco (as Donnio)
- Renée Valliers as Dulcinea
- Emily Fitzroy as Sancho Panza's wife
- Sidney Fox as Maria the niece
- Miles Mander as Duke of Fallanga
- Wally Patch as Gypsy King (English version)
- Vladimir Sokoloff as Gypsy King (French version)
- Oscar Asche as Police Captain
- Lydia Sherwood as Duchess of Fallanga
- Frank Stanmore as Priest
- Andreas Malandrinos as Innkeeper/Jester (uncredited)
- Vladimir Sokoloff as Servant (English version) (uncredited)

See also List of Don Quixote characters

== Reception ==
The film reportedly lost £100,000 and led to the collapse of Nelson Films.

== See also ==
- Don Quichotte à Dulcinée
