= The Devious Path =

1928 film by Georh Wilhelm Pabst

- Directed by: Georg Wilhelm Pabst
- Written by: Adolf Lantz; Ladislaus Vajda; Helen Gosewisch; Franz Schulz (story)
- Produced by: Fred Lyssa
- Starring: Gustav Diessl; Brigitte Helm; Hertha von Walther
- Cinematography: Theodor Sparkuhl
- Edited by: Georg Wilhelm Pabst; Mark Sorkin
- Music by: Elena Kats-Chernin; (1999 restored version)
- Production company: Erda-Film GmbH
- Distributed by: Deutsche Universal-Film
- Release date: 10 August 1928 (Germany)
- Running time: 98 minutes
- Country: Germany
- Languages: Silent film; German intertitles

The Devious Path (German: Abwege), also titled Crisis, is a 1928 German silent drama film directed by Georg Wilhelm Pabst starring Gustav Diessl and Brigitte Helm.

== Plot ==
Irene is frustrated by the inattentiveness of her lawyer husband Thomas, who refuses to go out with her and makes no secret of his aversion against her friend Liane. Attracted by artist Walter Frank, Irene visits him in his studio and agrees to his proposal to elope to Austria together, but Thomas puts an end to their plan. Later, she accompanies Thomas's colleague Möller to a nightclub, where she meets Liane and her friends and makes the acquaintance of boxer Sam. When Irene returns home, the couple seems to come closer to each other again, but when Thomas discovers a mascot which she took with her from the nightclub, he withdraws from her.

The next day, Liane and her friends pay Irene a visit, who is still lying in bed. Enervated by her guests, she becomes even more infuriated when Thomas makes no move to send them away. She visits Sam's workout place and talks him into visiting Frank's studio together. After fighting off Sam's advances, Liane causes a scene by making Thomas, who was told of her whereabouts by Liane, believe that she was about to sleep with Frank.

Some time later, Irene and Thomas appear at court for their divorce, but no sooner that their marriage has been dissolved, they rediscover their feelings for each other and decide to get married again.

== Cast ==
- Gustav Diessl as Dr. Thomas Beck
- Brigitte Helm as Irene Beck
- Hertha von Walther as Liane
- Jack Trevor as Walter Frank
- Fritz Odemar as Councillor Möller
- Nico Turoff as Sam Taylor
- Ilse Bachmann as Anita Haldern
- Richard Sora as André
- Peter Leschka as Robert
- Irm Cherry as Daisy
- Irma Green as Gina
- Tita Christescu as maid
- Jimmy Lygelt as second boxer

== Production ==
The Devious Path was produced by Berlin-based company Erda Film for Universal Pictures. The film's sets were designed by the art directors Otto Erdmann and Hans Sohnle.

== Release and legacy ==
The Devious Path premiered in Hamburg on 10 August 1928 and in Berlin on 5 September 1928.

In 1998, a restored version of the film was compiled from an incomplete German film negative and an incomplete print with French intertitles. This version premiered on Arte TV on 10 June 1999.

== Reception ==
In his 1947 study From Caligari to Hitler, film historian Siegfried Kracauer rated The Devious Path as "negligible if it were not for the nightclub scenes in which Pabst manages to evoke the impression that his characters are as they are because of the emptiness of the world they inhabit". Commenting on the film's restoration, the Filmdienst called Pabst's film a chamber play which "clear-sightedly reflects its characters' hollow rituals" and has remained "remarkably timeless" in its handling of subject and form.
