= Westfront 1918 =

1930 war film directed by G. W. Pabst

- Film poster from the world premiere
- Directed by: Georg Wilhelm Pabst
- Screenplay by: Ladislaus Vajda
- Based on: Four Infantrymen on the Western Front 1918 ("Vier von der Infanterie") (1929 novel) by Ernst Johannsen
- Produced by: Seymour Nebenzal
- Starring: Fritz Kampers; Gustav Diessl; Hans-Joachim Moebis; Claus Clausen
- Cinematography: Fritz Arno Wagner; Charles Métain
- Edited by: Jean Oser
- Music by: Alexander Laszlo
- Distributed by: Nero-Film
- Release date: 23 May 1930
- Running time: 96 minutes
- Country: Germany
- Language: German

Westfront 1918 is a German war film, set mostly in the trenches of the Western Front during World War I. It was directed in 1930 by G. W. Pabst, from a screenplay by Ladislaus Vajda based on the novel Four Infantrymen on the Western Front 1918 by Ernst Johannsen. The film shows the effect of the war on a group of infantrymen portrayed by an ensemble cast led by screen veterans Fritz Kampers and Gustav Diessl.

The film bears a very strong resemblance to its close contemporary All Quiet on the Western Front (1930), an American production, although it has a much bleaker tone, consistent with Pabst's New Objectivity work through the late 1920s. It was particularly pioneering in its early use of sound – it was Pabst's first "talkie" – in that Pabst managed to record live audio during complex tracking shots through the trenches.

Westfront 1918 was a critical success when it was released. Following the rise of National Socialism only a few years later, the new government banned the film from public viewing for its extremely harsh criticism, similar to many war poets of the era it depicts, of the mechanized and systematic slaughter of a generation of young men during a mere four years of trench warfare. Nazi Party Propaganda Minister Joseph Goebbels accordingly denounced Westfront 1918 as, "cowardly defeatism". Some shots from the film were used for scene-setting purposes in a 1937 BBC Television adaptation of the play Journey's End.

== Plot ==
Westfront 1918 (1930)

In 1918 in France during the last months of the First World War, four infantrymen – the Bavarian, a young man known as 'the Student', Karl, and the Lieutenant – spend a few rest-days behind the front. The Student falls in love with a French peasant girl, Yvette. Back at the front, the four suffer again the everyday hardships of war: dirt, trench warfare and the constant danger of death. The Bavarian, Karl and the Lieutenant become trapped when part of the trench collapses and the Student digs them out. Later they are mistakenly fired upon by their own artillery due to a misjudgement of distance and are again saved by the Student, who as a messenger risks his life to relay instructions to the soldiers setting the firing range of the artillery.

Karl receives leave, returning to his starving home town and promptly catches his wife in bed with the butcher's adult son. Embittered, he returns to the front. In his absence, the Student is stabbed in a melee; his body lying in the mud of a shell-hole, only one hand sticking out. An offensive by the Allies begins, supported by tanks, and a mass of French Army Poilus breaks through the German defences. During the battle against the French, Karl and the Bavarian are seriously wounded, covering the remaining members of the group. The Lieutenant has a nervous breakdown and falls into insanity. Shouting "Hurrah" non-stop, he salutes a pile of corpses. He is admitted to the field hospital together with Karl and the Bavarian. While the Lieutenant is being carried though the hospital, many injured soldiers can be seen. In a fever, Karl sees his wife again and gasps, "We are all to blame!". He dies and is covered up, while his hand still hangs out. The wounded French Poilu lying beside him grasps Karl's hand and says, "Comrades, not enemies". The final message is then displayed, "The End?!"

== Cast ==
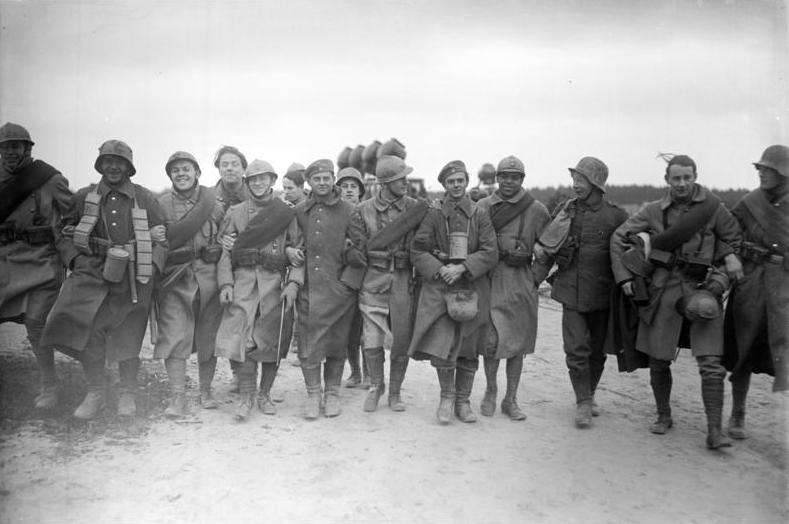
Some of the background actors

- Fritz Kampers as The Bavarian
- Gustav Diessl as Karl
- Hans-Joachim Moebis as The Student
- Claus Clausen as The Lieutenant
- Jackie Monnier as Yvette
- Hanna Hoessrich as Karl's Wife
- Else Helle as Karl's Mother
- Carl Ballhaus as Journeyman butcher
- Vladimir Sokoloff as Purser

== Reception ==
Contemporary reviews for Westfront 1918 were generally positive, according to film scholar Jan-Christopher Horak in a video interview accompanying the Criterion Collection release package. Alfred Kerr writing in the Berliner Tageblatt in 1930 said of it: "Apart from anything I saw in the winter, a sound film stirred me most: because it exposes the face of war for non-participants in the most shocking way. The numbing impression lasted for weeks and months. One should perform this piece every New Year's Day in every village, in every school by law. What are theatre plays?" In the Frankfurter Zeitung in the same year, Siegfried Kracauer wrote: "From the truthful reproduction of horror that prevails here, two scenes that almost exceed the limit of expression stand out. One: a single battle ends with an infantryman being drowned in the swamp in front of everyone. (The fact that you can still see his hand protrude from the bubbling mud later is unnecessary sensationalism.) The other is the front military hospital in the church with the maimed, nurses and doctors who can barely operate from exhaustion. It is as if medieval torture pictures come to life".

More recent reviews of the film, though generally positive, are more subdued. The review aggregator Rotten Tomatoes records 9/9 positive professional reviews, with the average score 7.9/10. Walter Goodman, in his review in The New York Times on 22 November 1987, compares the film unfavourably to Lewis Milestone's All Quiet in the Westfront, stating: "Although the German work ... isn't nearly as moving as "All Quiet", it has a power of its own... Pabst is especially good at giving a gritty documentary quality to the battle scenes; the pointless slaughter comes through. The movie is weaker when it focuses on individual soldiers. ... The truth of the movie is all in the trenches." J. Hoberman reviewed the film positively in The Village Voice on 10 May 2005, writing "The always protean Pabst made a brilliant adjustment to sound."

In a list of the 100 most important German films, compiled in 1994 by the Association of German Cinémathèques, Westfront 1918 was placed at #50.

== Home video ==
The Criterion Collection releases the film in the 2014 2K digital restoration by Deutsche Kinemathek in Blu-ray and DVD formats.
