= Jean Oser =

German-American film editor (1908–2002)

- Born: 1908; Straßburg, Alsace–Lorraine, German Empire
- Died: 20 February 2002 (aged 93–94); Regina, Saskatchewan, Canada
- Occupation: Editor
- Years active: 1928–1970 (film)

Jean Oser (1908–2002) was a German-American film editor. He was born in the Alsatian capital of Straßburg (French: Strasbourg), which then was part of the German Empire but was subsequently transferred to France. He never had a French citizenship. He is sometimes credited as Hans Oser.

In the 1970s, he taught at the University of Regina Department of Film.

== Selected filmography ==
- Land Without Women (1929)
- The Call of the North (1929)
- The Night Belongs to Us (1929)
- Dreyfus (1930)
- End of the Rainbow (1930)
- The Corvette Captain (1930)
- The Song of Life (1931)
- The Threepenny Opera (1931)
- L'Atlantide (1932)
- Happy Arenas (1935)
- The Lafarge Case (1938)
- The Postmaster's Daughter (1938)
- Final Accord (1938)
- Sarajevo (1940)

== Bibliography ==
- Susan M. White. The Cinema of Max Ophuls: Magisterial Vision and the Figure of Woman″. Columbia University Press, 1995.
