= The Threepenny Opera (1931 film) =

1931 film

- Promotional art in German film program
- Die Dreigroschenoper
- Directed by: G. W. Pabst
- Written by: Béla Balázs; Leo Lania; Ladislaus Vajda
- Based on: Die Dreigroschenoper (stage play with music, 1928) by Bertolt Brecht and Kurt Weill
- Produced by: Seymour Nebenzal
- Starring: Rudolf Forster; Margo Lion; Carola Neher; Lotte Lenya; Reinhold Schünzel
- Cinematography: Fritz Arno Wagner
- Edited by: Hans Oser (German version); Henri Rust (French version)
- Music by: Kurt Weill
- Production companies: Gemeinschaft mit Tobis; Warner Bros. Pictures GmbH
- Distributed by: Nero-Film; Tobis Filmkunst; Warner Bros. Pictures GmbH
- Release date: 19 February 1931
- Running time: 110 minutes (German version); 107 minutes (French version)
- Country: Germany
- Languages: German- and French-language versions

The Threepenny Opera (German: Die 3 Groschen-Oper) is a 1931 German musical film directed by G. W. Pabst. Produced by Seymour Nebenzal's Nero-Film for Tonbild-Syndikat AG (Tobis), Berlin and Warner Bros. Pictures GmbH, Berlin, the film is loosely based on the 1928 musical theatre success of the same name by Bertolt Brecht and Kurt Weill. As was usual in the early sound film era, Pabst also directed a French-language version of the film, L'Opéra de quat'sous, with some variation of plot details (the French title literally translates as "the fourpenny opera"). A planned English version went unproduced. The two existing versions were released on home video by The Criterion Collection. This film was shot at Staaken Studios

The Threepenny Opera differs in significant respects from the play and the internal timeline is somewhat vague. The whole of society is presented as corrupt in one form or another. Only some of the songs from the play are used, in a different order.

== Plot ==
In 19th century London, Macheath — known as Mackie Messer ("Mack the Knife") — is a Soho crime lord whose former lover is Jenny, a prostitute in a brothel on Turnbridge Street. On first meeting Polly Peachum, however, he persuades her to marry him. His gang steals the props required for a mock wedding in a dockside warehouse in the dead of night. The celebration is attended by Jackie "Tiger" Brown, Mackie's old comrade-in-arms from their army days in India who is now Chief of Police and about to oversee a procession through the city for the queen's coronation.

Polly's father, Mr Peachum, who runs a protection racket for the city's beggars, outfitting each with an appropriate costume, is furious at losing his daughter to a rival criminal. Visiting Brown, he denounces Mackie as a murderer and threatens to disrupt the queen's procession with a protest march of beggars if Mackie is not incarcerated. Tipped off by Brown to lie low, Mackie goes to the brothel, where the jealous Jenny betrays his presence to Mrs Peachum and the police. After a dramatic rooftop escape, he is arrested and imprisoned.

Meanwhile, Polly, who has been left in charge of the gang, takes over a bank and runs it with Mackie's henchmen. This impresses her parents who have a change of heart. Peachum tries to stop the protest march at the last minute but fails, and the procession escalates into a battle between beggars and police, enraging the new queen. Jenny visits the prison and, by distracting the jailer with her feminine wiles, allows Mackie to escape. He makes his way to the bank, where he discovers his new status as director. Peachum and Brown, whose careers are both ruined by the beggar demonstration, also come to the bank and agree to join forces with Mackie. Banking, after all, is a safer and more lucrative form of stealing. In a final shot the viewer sees the protesting beggars fading from sight into darkness.

== Cast ==
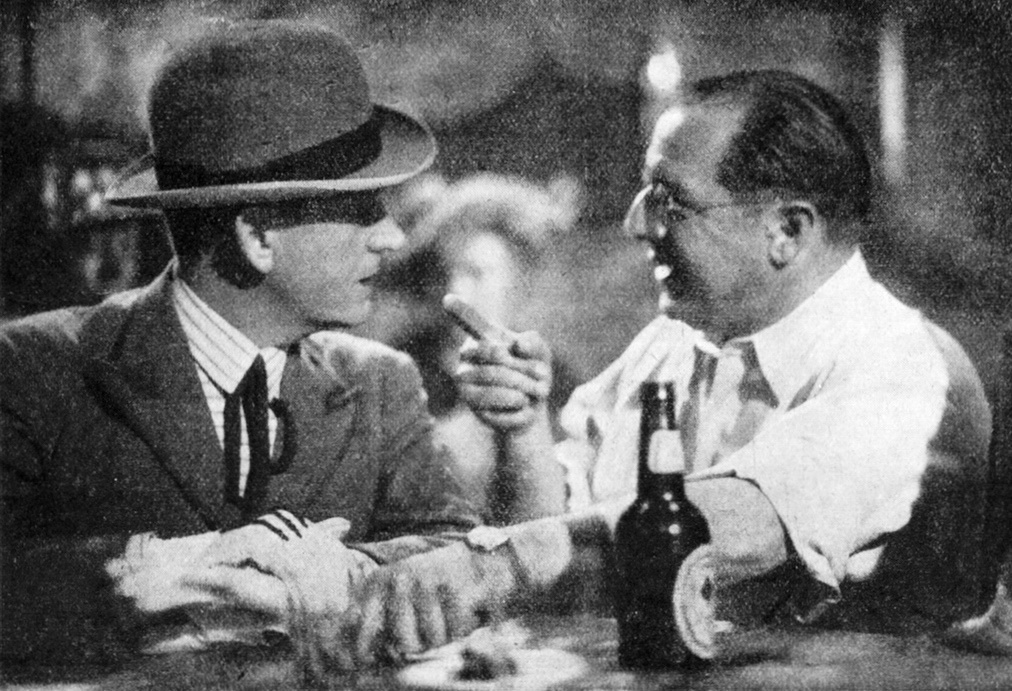
Film director Georg Wilhelm Pabst (right) and actor Albert Préjean (as Mackie Messer) during the filming of L'Opéra de quat'sous (The Threepenny Opera) in 1931

=== German-language version ===
- Rudolf Forster as Mackie Messer
- Carola Neher as Polly Peachum
- Reinhold Schünzel as Tiger Brown
- Fritz Rasp as Peachum
- Valeska Gert as Mrs Peachum
- Lotte Lenya as Jenny
- Hermann Thimig as the pastor
- Ernst Busch as the street singer
- Vladimir Sokoloff as jailer
- Paul Kemp as member of gang
- Gustav Püttjer as member of gang
- Oscar Höcker as member of gang
- Krafft Raschig as member of gang
- Herbert Grünbaum as Filch

==== Cast notes ====
- Rudolf Forster, Carola Neher and Lotte Lenya reprised their roles from the stage production. Neher later died in a Gulag in 1942 where she was sent to during the Great Purge.

=== French-language version ===
- Florelle as Polly Peachum
- Albert Préjean as Mackie
- Gaston Modot as Peachum
- Margo Lion as Jenny
- Vladimir Sokoloff as Smith, jailer
- Lucy de Matha as Mrs Peachum
- Jacques Henley as Tiger Brown
- Hermann Thimig as parson
- Antonin Artaud as beggar
- Roger Gaillard as beggar
- Marie-Antoinette Buzet as whore at Turnbridge

== Production ==
Bertolt Brecht and Kurt Weill, the playwright and composer of the stage play that the film is based on, were originally hired to adapt the play for film, but Brecht quit in the middle of production, while Weill continued working on the film until he was fired. The two each sued Warner Bros. and the German production company on the basis that the contract on the sale of the rights stipulated that nothing in the stage production could be changed for the film. Brecht and Weill intended the piece as a satire on capitalism, and claimed that the ideological basis of the story was softened by director G. W. Pabst, who wanted the film to be more entertaining. Brecht was accused of breach of contract and his suit was rejected, but Weill won his suit.

=== Censorship ===
In August 1933, Pabst's film was banned by the Nazis, and the negative and all prints that could be located were destroyed. The film was later reconstructed in 1960 by Thomas Brandon with the assistance of the Museum of Modern Art.

The French version was originally rejected by the British Board of Film Classification, but was eventually passed PG in 1998.

== Songs ==
Not all the songs from the stage production were used in the film. Songs that were used include "The Ballad of Mackie Messer", "Love Duet", "Barbara Song", "Is It a Lot I'm Asking?", "The Ballad of the Ship with Fifty Cannons", "The Cannon Song", and "Song of the Insufficiency of Human Endeavor".

== Release ==
The Threepenny Opera was the first film presented at Warner Brothers' new foreign-language theater in New York City.

The versions of the film released in the United States and the United Kingdom were shorter than the 110 minutes of the original German version.

== Reception ==
The Japanese filmmaker Akira Kurosawa cited this movie as one of his 100 favorite films. Leonard Maltin gave it three and a half of four stars: "Fine musical satire chronicling activities of dashing gangster Forster, his cohorts, and antagonists, with Lenya outstanding as Pirate Jenny." In a list of the 100 most important German films, compiled in 1994 by the Association of German Cinémathèques, The Threepenny Opera was placed at #51.
