= G. W. Pabst =

Austrian film director (1885–1967)

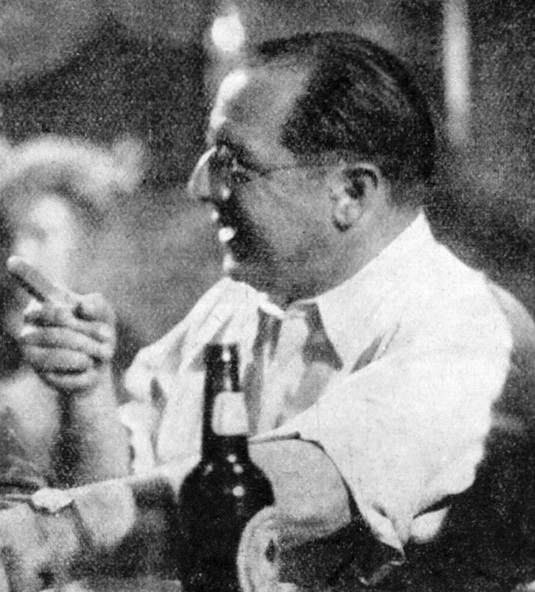
- G. W. Pabst during production of the film L'Opéra de quat'sous (The Threepenny Opera) in 1931
- Born: Georg Wilhelm Pabst; 25 August 1885; Raudnitz, Bohemia, Austria-Hungary
- Died: 29 May 1967 (aged 81); Vienna, Austria
- Resting place: Zentralfriedhof
- Years active: 1901–1957
- Spouse: Gertrude Hennings (m. 1924)
- Children: Michael Pabst (1941–2008)

Georg Wilhelm Pabst (25 August 1885 – 29 May 1967) was an Austrian film director and screenwriter. He started as an actor and theater director, before becoming one of the most influential German-language filmmakers during the Weimar Republic.

== Early years ==
Pabst was born in Raudnitz, Bohemia, Austria-Hungary (today's Roudnice nad Labem, Czech Republic), the son of a railroad official. While growing up in Vienna, he studied drama at the Academy of Decorative Arts and began his career as a stage actor in Switzerland, Austria and Germany. In 1910, Pabst traveled to the United States, where he worked as an actor and director at the German Theater in New York City.

In 1914, he decided to become a director, and he returned to recruit actors in Europe. Pabst was in France when World War I began. He was arrested and held as an enemy alien and interned in a prisoner-of-war camp near Brest. While imprisoned, Pabst organised a theatre group at the camp and directed French-language plays. Upon his release in 1919, he returned to Vienna, where he became director of the Neue Wiener Bühne, an avant-garde theatre.

== Career ==
Pabst began his career as a film director at the behest of Carl Froelich who hired Pabst as an assistant director. He directed his first film, The Treasure, in 1923. He developed a talent for "discovering" and developing the talents of actresses, such as Louise Brooks and Leni Riefenstahl.

Film theorist Karel Reisz noted that Pabst was among the first filmmakers to time his cuts to specific movements, using cutting on action to create seamless transitions and enhance the fluidity of his films.

Pabst's best known films concern the plight of women, including The Joyless Street (1925) with Greta Garbo and Asta Nielsen, Secrets of a Soul (1926) with Lili Damita, The Loves of Jeanne Ney (1927) with Brigitte Helm, and Pandora's Box (1929) and Diary of a Lost Girl (1929) with American actress Louise Brooks. He also co-directed with Arnold Fanck a mountain film entitled The White Hell of Pitz Palu (1929) starring Leni Riefenstahl.

After the coming of sound, he made a trilogy of films that secured his reputation: Westfront 1918 (1930), The Threepenny Opera (1931) with Lotte Lenya (based on the Bertolt Brecht and Kurt Weill musical), and Kameradschaft (1931). Pabst also filmed three versions of Pierre Benoit's novel L'Atlantide in 1932, in German, English, and French, titled Die Herrin von Atlantis, The Mistress of Atlantis, and L'Atlantide, respectively. In 1933, Pabst directed Don Quixote, once again in German, English, and French versions. He made A Modern Hero (1934) in the USA and Street of Shadows (1937) in France.

Pabst was planning to emigrate to the United States, but when war was declared in 1939 he found himself trapped in Austria on a visit to his mother. He was forced to remain in Nazi Germany. Under the auspices of propaganda minister, Josef Goebbels, Pabst made two films in Germany during this period: The Comedians (1941) and Paracelsus (1943).

Pabst directed four opera productions in Italy in 1953: La forza del destino for the Maggio Musicale Fiorentino in Florence (conducted by Dimitri Mitropoulos, the cast included Renata Tebaldi, Fedora Barbieri, Mario del Monaco, Aldo Protti, Cesare Siepi), and a few weeks later, for the Arena di Verona Festival, a spectacular Aïda, with Maria Callas in the title role (conducted by Tullio Serafin, with del Monaco), Il trovatore and again La forza del destino.

He directed The Last Ten Days (1955), the first post-war German feature film to feature Adolf Hitler as a character.

== Death ==
On 29 May 1967, Pabst died in Vienna at the age of 81. He was interred at the Zentralfriedhof in Vienna.

== Awards ==
- 1941, Venice Film Festival: Gold Medal of the Biennale for Best Director for his film The Comedians

== Legacy ==
=== In fiction ===
Daniel Kehlmann's 2023 novel, The Director, shows Pabst's moral struggles under the Nazi regime.

== Filmography ==
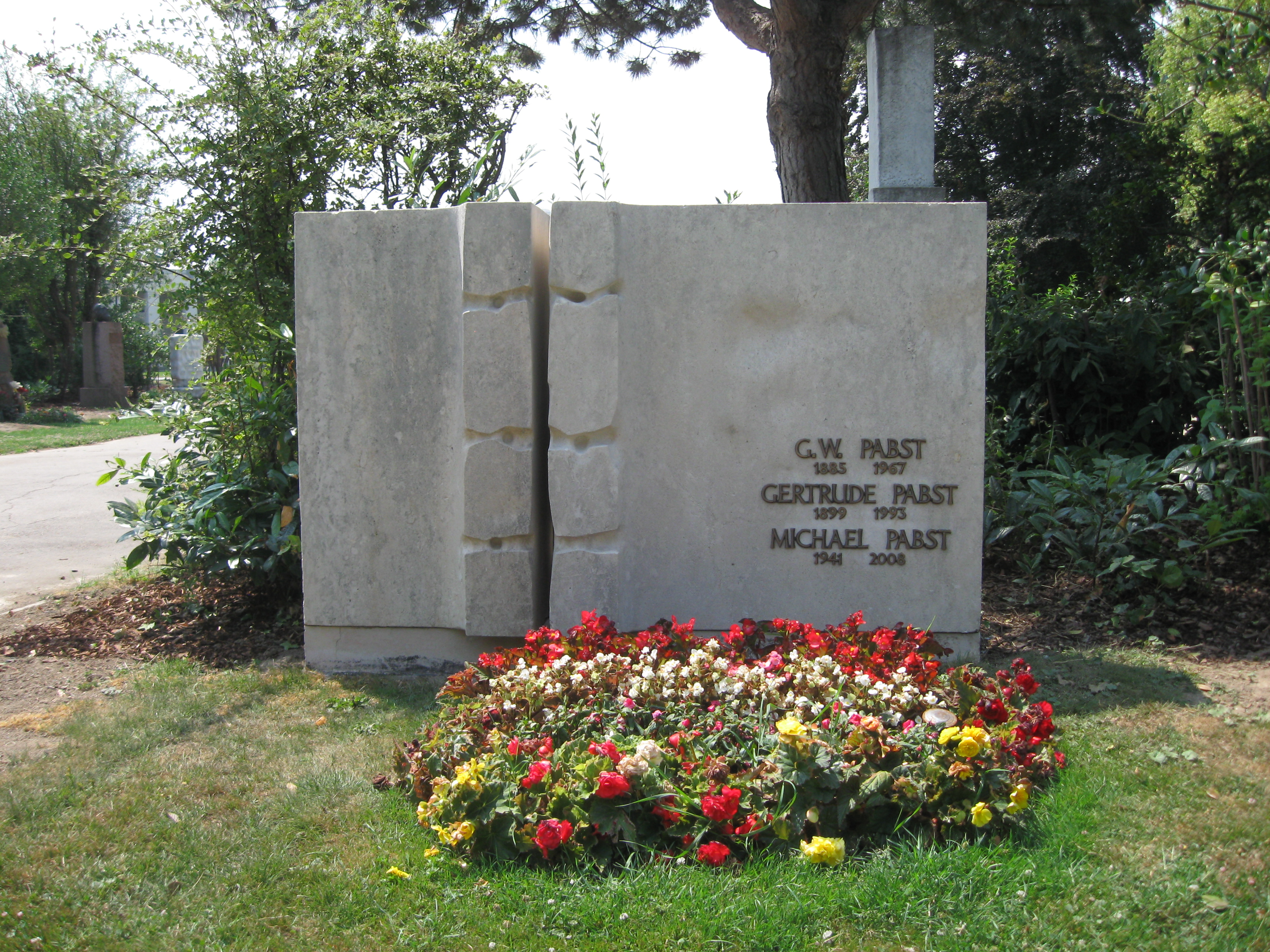
Grave of G.W. Pabst, his wife and son at the Zentralfriedhof in Vienna

- The Treasure (1923)
- Countess Donelli (1924)
- Joyless Street (1925)
- Secrets of a Soul (1926)
- One Does Not Play with Love (1926)
- The Love of Jeanne Ney (1927)
- The Devious Path (1928)
- Pandora's Box (1929)
- Diary of a Lost Girl (1929)
- The White Hell of Pitz Palu (dir. Arnold Fanck, 1929)
- Westfront 1918 (1930)
- Scandalous Eva (1930)
- Morals at Midnight (dir. Marc Sorkin, 1930)
- The Threepenny Opera (1931) two versions: German and French
- Kameradschaft (1931)
- L'Atlantide (1932) three versions: German, French, and English
- Don Quixote (1933) three versions: German, French, and English
- High and Low (1933)
- Cette nuit-là (1933)
- A Modern Hero (1934)
- Street of Shadows (1937)
- The Shanghai Drama (1938)
- Girls in Distress (1939)
- The Comedians (1941)
- Paracelsus (1943)
- Der Fall Molander (1945)
- The Trial (1948)
- Mysterious Shadows (1949)
- Duel with Death (1949)
- Call Over the Air (dir. Georg C. Klaren, 1951)
- Voice of Silence (1953)
- Cose da pazzi (1953)
- The Confession of Ina Kahr (1954)
- The Last Ten Days (1955)
- Jackboot Mutiny (1955)
- Ballerina (1956)
- Through the Forests and Through the Trees (1956)

== See also ==
- Max Deutsch, composer
