= The inmates are running the asylum =

The inmates are running the asylum is:

- A reference to 1989 cult film Dr. Caligari.
- A reference to the 1920 film The Cabinet of Dr. Caligari.
- A reference to the 2014 film Stonehearst Asylum.
- A 1998 book by software designer and programmer Alan Cooper (software designer), "the father of Visual Basic".
- See also, the 1981 song by British band, Fun Boy Three, "The Lunatics Have Taken Over the Asylum".
