= Nightdreams =

- VHS released by Wonderful World of Video and Caballero Control Corporation
- Directed by: Francis Delia
- Written by: Jerry Stahl; Stephen Sayadian
- Produced by: Stephen Sayadian
- Cinematography: Francis Delia
- Edited by: Pearl Diamond
- Music by: Mitchell Froom; Wall of Voodoo
- Production company: Caribbean Films
- Distributed by: Wonderful World of Video; Caballero Control Corporation
- Release date: 1981 (United States)
- Running time: 78 minutes
- Country: United States
- Language: English
- Budget: $60,000

Nightdreams is a 1981 pornographic film with strong horror elements, directed by Francis Delia and written by Jerry Stahl and Stephen Sayadian (credited as "Herbert W. Day" and "Rinse Dream", respectively).

== Plot ==
Two scientists use electric jolts to induce surreal and erotic dreams in a woman named Mrs. Van Houten. The dreams include a series of bizarre scenes, ranging from having sex with a man inside a Cream of Wheat box to a descent into the abyss of Hell. A surprise ending ultimately reveals the true identity of the woman receiving the electric shocks.

== Cast ==
- Dorothy LeMay as Mrs. Van Houten
- Loni Sanders as The Demon's Slave
- Jennifer West as Doctor
- Kevin James as Heaven Man
- Fast Steppin' Freddie as Cream of Wheat
- Paul Berthell as Slice of Bread
- Ken Starbuck as The Demon
- Jacqueline Lorians as Brunette Cowgirl
- Danielle as Blonde Cowgirl
- Andy Nichols as Doctor
- Michelle Bauer as Chained Girl

== Production ==
Producer Stephen Sayadian said in an interview: "We did it as a series of six or seven vignettes; we just sat down and hashed out the concepts. We’ll go to Heaven, we’ll go to Hell, we’ll have one in the Wild West. It was supposed to be like an old Vaudeville review." His studio also produced one sheets and promotional posters for horror movies such as Dressed to Kill and The Funhouse and the sets used in both movies' posters were also used in filming Nightdreams. It cost $60,000 to make.

== Release ==
=== Reception ===
The film has received generally positive reviews. It was described by Playboy magazine as “the first avant-garde adult film…Fellini meets Eraserhead,” and by Velvet magazine as “the Citizen Kane of adult films.” Adult Video News, Adam Film World and Hustler all gave it ratings of between four and five stars in their reviews. Adam Film World said, "The film is outstanding for its superb and visually exciting cinematography and extraordinarily imaginative erotic fantasies.

Pornographic film historian Jim Holliday called it "the most unusual, unique and innovative adult film yet made" and said Nightdreams "pioneered a whole new subgenre within the industry" within five years of its release due to its "raunchy gritty sexuality…combined with truly new wave sets and the Miami Vice '80s look".

=== Box office ===
According to Sayadian "neither Nightdreams or Café Flesh were ever that successful as porn films. But they broke house records as midnight movies."

=== Home media ===
The film was subsequently released on VHS by Caballero Home Video, which re-released it in 2006 on DVD.

=== Accolades and awards ===
The film was voted into the XRCO Hall of Fame in 1992.

In 1986, Holliday placed it in 13th place on a list of the top 40 best adult films as selected by a consensus of industry experts. In 2001, Adult Video News placed it in 62nd place on its list of the greatest adult movies of all time. In 2007, AVN called it one of the "50 most influential adult releases of all time" for starting the alt-porn genre, which uses "MTV-inspired, rock-video schtick, hipster references and underground music."

== Soundtrack ==
The soundtrack includes "Ring of Fire" as covered by Wall of Voodoo as well as renditions of "Ol' Man River" and Gymnopédies.

== Sequels ==
Nightdreams was followed by Nightdreams II in 1989, and Nightdreams 3 in 1991. Both of these films were directed by Stephen Sayadian. The Mrs. Van Houten character also appeared in Sayadian and Stahl's 1989 effort Dr. Caligari.

== See also ==
- Golden Age of Porn

== Works cited ==
- Macfarlane, Steve (2024). "Dream Work". Filmmaker. Vol. 33, no. 1. The Gotham Film & Media Institute.
