= Francis Delia =

American film director (born c. 1948)

- Born: 1947 or 1948 (age 77–78)
- Other names: Frank Delia, F.X. Pope, Francis X. Wolfe
- Occupations: Director, writer, producer, cinematographer, photographer, guitarist
- Years active: 1965–1966 (with The Bruthers); 1975–present (photography, film and television)
- Relatives: Joe Delia (brother)

Francis Delia (born c. 1948) is an American filmmaker, photographer, writer and musician, at times credited as Francis X. Wolfe or F.X. Pope

As Frank Delia, he was the guitarist of The Bruthers, a 1960s New York garage rock band whose four members were all brothers.

Delia worked as a photographer in the 1970s, working for a time with Hustler magazine. His first experiences as a cinematographer and director were in the pornographic film genre.

After relocating to Los Angeles with Hustler in 1978, he became co-founder and president of Wolfe Co., a film production company. He directed music videos in the 1980s, such as the videos for Wall of Voodoo's "Mexican Radio", "Somebody's Watching Me" by Rockwell as well as several videos for The Ramones, including the video for "Psycho Therapy", which made Rolling Stone's 1993 list of "The Top 100 Videos".

He also directed episodes of several television series in the 1980s and 1990s, as well as the feature films Freeway, Trouble Bound and Time of Her Time.

== Career ==
=== The Bruthers ===
Delia was one of nine brothers and grew-up in Pearl River, New York. In 1960, Delia and his three of brothers — Mike, Al and Joe — formed the garage band The Bruthers and toured colleges for several years. The band was signed to RCA Records and released the single Bad Way to Go/Bad Love in 1966.

Delia told The Morning Call in 1966 that their father, Alfred W. Delia, was always supportive of his sons' creative endeavors. He also co-managed the band with famed music promoter and talent manager Sid Bernstein. The band broke up in 1967 after they were dropped by RCA.

=== Work in visual media ===
Delia attended the Cooper Union School of Art and started work as a photographer in 1975, working for ad agencies and publications such as National Lampoon and High Times. His first experience with a film camera was after meeting director Abel Ferrara, who frequently collaborated with Delia's brother, film composer Joe Delia. Delia served as Ferrara's cinematographer for his 1976 pornographic film, 9 Lives of a Wet Pussy, under the pseudonym Francis X. Wolfe.

Delia worked as a photographer for Hustler magazine, along with creative director Stephen Sayadian and writer Jerry Stahl. The three men relocated to Los Angeles with the magazine in 1978. After the move, the trio formed an art design company that created posters and one sheets for films, such as The Fog (1980), Dressed to Kill (1980), The Exterminator (1980) and Escape from New York (1981).

Delia's first experience as a film director was the 1981 pornographic horror Nightdreams, which was written by Sayadian and Stahl. Delia also acted as cinematographer and producer of Sayadian's 1982 pornographic science fiction film Café Flesh. Delia was credited under the pseudonym F.X. Pope for both films.

In 1982, Delia founded the film and visual media production company, Wolfe Company, which employed filmmakers such as Jean-Pierre Dutilleux, Russell Mulcahy, Brian Grant. The company started out producing movie trailers. including trailers for the films A Night In Heaven and Revenge of the Nerds, which were both directed by Delia, but within a couple of years the company's focus shifted to mostly music video production.

Delia's first music video was for the Wall of Voodoo single "Mexican Radio". The band were longtime friends of Delia's and their practice space was in the same building as the art studio he shared with Sayadian and Stahl. The Ramones liked the video and asked him to create a video for their single "Psycho Therapy". The video features a man who undergoes a lobotomy. The Ramones were pleased with the video, but MTV refused to air it until some scenes were cut. The video made Rolling Stone's 1993 list of "The Top 100 Videos". Delia also directed video for the Ramones' "Howling at the Moon (Sha–La–La)".

Some of the other songs for which he directed videos include "The Real World" by The Bangles, "A Million Miles Away" by The Plimsouls, "Somebody's Watching Me" by Rockwell, "Heard The News" by David Johansen, "Colored Lights" by The Blasters, "The Right to Rock" by Keel and "Love Always" by El DeBarge. Delia also directed videos for Starship's singles "We Built This City", "Sara", and "Tomorrow Doesn't Matter Tonight". He filmed The Fleshtones for The Beast of IRS Video, Vol I, a compilation of clips of music artists on the I.R.S. Records label, in addition to a film of Gary Numan in concert and a series of public service announcements for the campaign titled "Fight the Fear with Facts" by the AIDS Project Los Angeles.

Delia's feature film debut was the 1988 thriller Freeway, starring Darlanne Fluegel, James Russo and Michael Callan, which Delia both wrote and directed. He directed the 1993 crime comedy-drama film Trouble Bound, starring Patricia Arquette, Billy Bob Thornton and Michael Madsen. He directed the 1999 erotic film, Time of Her Time, starring Linden Ashby, and adapted the script from the short story "The Time of Her Time" by Norman Mailer. He also directed episodes of the television series Max Headroom, Friday the 13th: The Series (and wrote one episode), Against the Law and War of the Worlds.

In the 2000s Delia founded the film production company called Radioactive Digital Pictures, or RADPics, and in the 2010s it was announced that Delia was working on two film projects with musician Phil Driscoll, a music feature film titled Symphony of the Universe, as well as A Long Day Journey, a biopic about Driscoll's life starring Danny Glover, Derek Luke and Brian Dennehy that was to be released in 3D format, although these films have yet to be released.

== Filmography ==
=== Films ===
Year	Title	Director	Writer	Producer	Cinematographer	Notes
1976	9 Lives of a Wet Pussy	No	No	No	Yes	Credited as Francis X. Wolfe
1981	Nightdreams	Yes	No	No	Yes	Credited as F.X. Pope
1982	Café Flesh	No	No	Yes	Yes	Credited as F.X. Pope
1988	Freeway	Yes	Yes	No	No	
1993	Trouble Bound	No	Yes	No	No	Co-producer
1999	Time of Her Time	Yes	Yes	No	No	
2005	An American Haunting	No	No	No	No	Co-executive producer
2008	The Game: Life After the Math	Yes	Yes	No	No	Documentary about rapper The Game

=== Music videos ===
Year	Song	Artist
1983	"Mexican Radio"	Wall of Voodoo
1983	"Psycho Therapy"	Ramones
1983	"The Real World"	The Bangles
1983	"A Million Miles Away"	The Plimsouls
1984	"Somebody's Watching Me"	Rockwell
1984	"Howling at the Moon (Sha-La-La)"	Ramones
1984	"Heard the News"	David Johansen
1985	"The Right to Rock"	Keel
1985	"We Built This City"	Starship
1985	"Sara"	Starship
1985	"Tomorrow Doesn't Matter Tonight"	Starship
1986	"Love Always"	El DeBarge

=== Television ===
Year	Title	Episode	Director	Writer
1986	Crime Story	"Hide and Go Thief" (season 1, episode 13)	Yes	No
1986	Crime Story	"Strange Bedfellows" (season 1, episode 14)	Yes	No
1987	Max Headroom	"Body Banks" (season 1, episode 3)	Yes	No
1988	Friday the 13th: The Series	"Read My Lips"	Yes	No
1988	Friday the 13th: The Series	"Symphony in B-Sharp"	Yes	No
1989	Friday the 13th: The Series	"The Butcher"	Yes	Yes
1989	Friday the 13th: The Series	"Femme Fatale"	Yes	No
1989	War of the Worlds	"The Second Wave"	Yes	No
1990	War of the Worlds	"Synthetic Love"	Yes	No
1990	Against the Law	"The Price of Life"	Yes	No
