= Theory of Film (Kracauer) =

1960 nonfiction book by S. Kracauer

Theory of Film: The Redemption of Physical Reality is a realist film theory book by Siegfried Kracauer. It was originally published in 1960 by Oxford University Press.

== See also ==
- From Caligari to Hitler also by Siegfried Kracauer
- The Cabinet of Dr. Caligari a noted silent film directed by Robert Wiene
- Talking pictures
