= From Caligari to Hitler =

Book by Siegfried Kracauer

- First edition
- Author: Siegfried Kracauer
- Language: English
- Genre: Non-fiction
- Publisher: Princeton University Press
- Publication date: 1947
- Publication place: United States

From Caligari to Hitler: A Psychological History of the German Film is a book by film theorist and writer Siegfried Kracauer, published in 1947.

== Background ==
This work of film theory is one of the first major studies of German film between World War I and World War II and is best known for proposing a link between the apolitical and escapist orientation of Weimar-era cinema and later German totalitarianism. Kracauer—known as an important film critic in Germany from the 1920s onward—moved from exile in France to the United States in 1941. Once settled in New York City, he received support from the Rockefeller and Solomon R. Guggenheim foundations to conduct research on Nazi film. His first publication from these investigations, Propaganda and the Nazi War Film (1942), examines visual themes in Nazi propaganda films as tools of psychological influence. The second work Kracauer published from his research is From Caligari to Hitler in 1947.

== Summary ==
The book identifies and examines four chronological phases of German film between the wars: The Archaic Period (1895–1918), The Postwar Period (1918–1924), The Stabilized Period (1924–1929) and The Pre-Hitler Period (1930–1933). The volume also reprints Propaganda and the Nazi War Film, the author's critical and psychological analysis of Nazi propaganda film. As a film critic, Kracauer reviewed many of the films discussed in the book at the time they were released. From Caligari to Hitler melds his understanding of trends in the film market with analysis of political tendencies of German social politics.

Kracauer proposes that Robert Wiene's film The Cabinet of Dr. Caligari is an allegory for German social attitudes. Kracauer argued that Caligari symbolizes autocratic tendencies inherent in the German system, observing that the character "stands for an unlimited authority that idolizes power as such, and, to satisfy its lust for domination, ruthlessly violates all human rights and values."

== Reception and legacy ==
In Weimar Cinema and After, Thomas Elsaesser describes the legacy of Kracauer's work as a "historical imaginary". Elsaesser argues that Kracauer had not studied enough films to make his thesis about the social mindset of Germany legitimate and that the discovery and publication of the original screenplay of The Cabinet of Dr. Caligari undermines his argument about the revolutionary intent of its writers. Elsaesser's alternative thesis is that the filmmakers adopted an Expressionist style as a method of product differentiation, establishing a distinct national product against the increasing importation of American films. Dietrich Scheunemann, somewhat in defense of Kracauer, noted that he did not have "the full range of materials at (his) disposal". However, that fact "has clearly and adversely affected the discussion of the film", referring to the fact that the script of Caligari was not rediscovered until 1977 and that Kracauer had not seen the film for around 20 years when he wrote the work.

The 2014 documentary film From Caligari To Hitler: German Cinema In The Age Of The Masses by Rüdiger Suchsland, drew its title from the book and shares some of Kracauer's opinions on Weimar cinema.

== See also ==
- Theory of Film (1960) also by Siegfried Kracauer
