= Fox Harris =

American actor (1936–1988)

- Born: May 3, 1936; Pennsylvania, United States
- Died: December 27, 1988 (aged 52); Century City, California, United States
- Occupation: Actor

Fox Harris (May 3, 1936 – December 27, 1988) was an American actor known for such films as Repo Man, Sid and Nancy, Straight to Hell, Hollywood Chainsaw Hookers, The Underachievers and Dr. Caligari.

Harris worked frequently with film directors Alex Cox and Fred Olen Ray.

Harris appeared in three of Cox's films, most notably in Repo Man as the mad scientist J. Frank Parnell. Cox first met Harris when Cox was working as an unpaid caretaker at the Actors Studio in Hollywood, saying that "The only actor who was friendly was Fox Harris: He put on no airs, treated us as if we were human, and didn’t steal our food." He described Harris as "a generous, exciting actor" who "became the focus of any scene he was in", but also a "self-made character" who had run-ins with the law in his youth, and did not tell Cox that he could not drive even after being cast in Repo Man as a character who drives a Chevy Malibu, a fact Cox only learned when Harris drove the car straight into a gas pump.

Harris died of lung cancer in 1988 at age 52 in Century City, California. In his memoir X Films, Cox says that Harris had been diagnosed with AIDS around 1987, shortly before filming Walker.

== Partial filmography ==
- Forbidden World (1982) — Cal Timbergen
- Hammett (1982) — Frank the News Vendor
- Human Highway (1982) — Sheik
- My Favorite Year (1982) — Curt / Featured Player
- Lookin' to Get Out (1982) — Harvey, The Elevator Operator
- Rock 'n' Roll Hotel (1983)
- Repo Man (1984) — J. Frank Parnell
- Sid and Nancy (1986) — Old Stain
- Armed Response (1986) — Club Owner
- Straight to Hell (1987) — Kim Blousson
- Evil Spawn (1987) — Harry
- Walker (1987) — District Attorney
- The Underachievers (1987) — Margrave
- Hollywood Chainsaw Hookers (1988) — Hermie
- Deep Space (1988) — Prof. Whately
- Warlords (1988) — Colonel Cox
- Terminal Force (1989) — Hendrix
- Mutant on the Bounty (1989) — Captain Ferris
- Dr. Caligari (1989) — Dr. Avol
- Terror Eyes (1989) — Ticket Man
- Alienator (1990) — Burt
- Nerds of a Feather (1990) — Russian Scientist
