= Freeway (1988 film) =

1988 film directed by Francis Delia

- Theatrical release poster
- Directed by: Francis Delia
- Screenplay by: Darrell Fetty; Francis Delia
- Based on: Freeway by Deanne Barkley
- Produced by: Peter S. Davis; William N. Panzer
- Starring: Darlanne Fluegel; James Russo; Richard Belzer; Michael Callan; Billy Drago
- Cinematography: Frank Byers
- Edited by: Philip Sgriccia
- Music by: Joe Delia
- Production company: Gower Street Pictures
- Distributed by: New World Pictures
- Release date: September 2, 1988 (United States)
- Running time: 91 minutes
- Country: United States
- Language: English
- Box office: $295,493

Freeway is a 1988 American neo-noir thriller film directed by Francis Delia from a screenplay by Darrell Fetty and Delia, based on the 1978 novel of the same name by the then-head of NBC programming, Deanne Barkley. It stars Darlanne Fluegel, James Russo, Richard Belzer, Michael Callan, and Billy Drago.

== Plot ==
After her husband’s murderer escapes justice, Sarah "Sunny" Harper (Fluegel) witnesses the work of a spree killer (Drago) who shoots people on the freeway and later quotes Bible passages to a local radio station’s psychiatrist disc jockey (Belzer). Police are unwilling to listen to Sunny, but a former cop named Frank Quinn (Russo) agrees to protect her, and later the two join forces to find the deranged freeway killer before he strikes again. The killer, who turns out to be a man who calls himself "Father Eddie," drives a beat-up 1969 Lincoln Continental sedan. The story takes place in southern California.

== Cast ==
- Darlanne Fluegel as Sarah "Sunny" Harper
- James Russo as Frank Quinn
- Billy Drago as Edward Anthony Heller
- Richard Belzer as Dr. David Lazarus
- Michael Callan as Lt. Boyle
- Joey Palase as Detective Gomez
- Steve Franken as Lawyer
- Brain Kaiser as Morrie
- Julienne Dallara as Roseanne Rivera
- Kenneth Tobey as Monsignor Kavanaugh
- Clint Howard as Ronnie
- Gene LeBell as Officer Berryman

== Release ==
Freeway grossed $14,945 in its opening weekend. The film grossed $295,493 worldwide.

=== Home media ===
Freeway was released on DVD on July 18, 2017, by Lakeshore Entertainment.
