= The Bruthers =

American garage rock band (1965–1966)

- Origin: Pearl River, New York, United States
- Genre: Garage rock
- Years active: 1965–1966
- Label: RCA
- Past members: Alf Delia; Frank Delia; Mike Delia; Joe Delia

The Bruthers were an American garage rock band from Pearl River, New York, active in the mid to late 1960s, and whose membership consisted the four brothers, Alf, Frank, Mike, and Joe of the Delia family. They recorded several songs for RCA records, of which, "Bad Way to Go" is the best known. The song is included on the compilation album, Pebbles Vol. 8, and is regarded by enthusiasts and collectors as a classic in the genre.

== History ==
The four Delia brothers started playing as a group in the early 1960s. They were signed with manager, Sid Bernstein, best known for promoting the Beatles' Shea Stadium concerts in New York City, and who managed successful acts, such as The Young Rascals and The Blues Project. Bernstein was able to arrange a recording contract with RCA Records. In 1966, they released the single, "Bad Way to Go" / "Bad Love." Though its A-side has come to be regarded as a classic in garage rock, the single failed to chart. Also that year, one of their unreleased songs, "Rock It to Me," was used as background music for the Muppets' first network TV appearance on the September 18 episode of The Ed Sullivan Show. Though the Bruthers continued to recorded several more songs for RCA, such as "The Courtship Of Rapunzel," which would later be included on the Garage Beat '66 Vol. 6: Speak of the Devil compilation issued by Sundazed, they were soon dropped from the label, and broke up in 1967.

After the Bruthers disbanded, keyboard player, Joe Delia, played as a sideman to numerous artists, such as David Johansen (a.k.a. Buster Poindexter) in his 1987 hit "Hot, Hot, Hot" and went on to work on soundtracks for various movies, documentaries, and TV shows. Guitarist, "Frank" (now known as director Francis Delia), worked as a commercial photographer for several Madison Avenue Advertising agencies, as well as magazines including National Lampoon and High Times. Delia also served as Cinematographer on Abel Ferrara's early films. Francis went on to direct over eighty music videos which include "Sara" & "We Built This City" for Starship, Rockwell's Michael Jackson infused "Somebody’s Watching Me", Wall of Voodoo's "Mexican Radio", The Ramones’ "Psychotherapy", and many many more. Alf wrote the song "We Want Lava" which was recorded by The Beaver Trail Boys and had a moderate amount of radio airplay in 1980. He continued to record into the 2010s. The Bruthers complete recordings for RCA were released on the compilation, Bad Way to Go, issued by Sundazed on October 21, 2003.

== Personnel ==
- Alf Delia (vocals)
- Frank Delia (guitar)
- Joe Delia (organ, keyboards)
- Mike Delia (drums)

== Discography ==
=== Singles ===
- "Bad Way to Go" b/w "Bad Love" (RCA, rel. 1966)

=== Compilations ===
- Bad Way to Go (Sundazed SC 6209, rel. 2003) – CD collection of the RCA recordings
