= Stephen Sayadian =

American multimedia artist (born 1953)

- Born: October 18, 1953 (age 72); Chicago, Illinois, USA
- Occupations: Creative director, production designer, film director
- Writing career
- Pen name: Rinse Dream
- Years active: 1980s–1990s

Stephen Sayadian, also known as Rinse Dream, is a multimedia artist and pornographer who was active in the 1980s and 1990s.

He was the advertising creative director for Larry Flynt Publications and an art director and production designer for VHS box art covers and movie posters of the 1980s. Later, he wrote, produced, and directed stylised pornographic and erotic films, including Nightdreams (1981), Café Flesh (1982), and Dr. Caligari (1989).

== Career ==
Sayadian began his career as a magazine satirist, having submitted work to Mad, Marvel Comics, and National Lampoon. In the fall of 1976, Sayadian took his portfolio to publisher Larry Flynt. who immediately hired him as the creative director of humor and advertising for Larry Flynt Publications, where he conceptualized ad campaigns for Hustler.

After Hustler relocated to Los Angeles in 1978, Sayadian continued to work with the magazine as a contractor. He founded Wolfe Studio, an art direction company, with photographer Francis Delia. Together they designed one-sheet imagery for film posters and VHS box covers of the 1980s, including Brian De Palma's Dressed to Kill (1980), John Carpenter's The Fog (1980), and Tobe Hooper's The Funhouse (1981).

In 1981, Sayadian and Delia teamed with former Hustler writer Jerry Stahl and began collaborating on avant-garde pornographic films. It was at this time that Sayadian began using the pseudonym Rinse Dream because of the risk involved with using his actual name for creating pornographic films. Nightdreams (1981) was co-written by Sayadian (as Rinse Dream) and Stahl (as Herbert W. Day) with Delia (as F.X. Pope) behind the camera as the cinematographer and director. Nightdreams was produced on a budget of $65,000 and used recycled sets from Wolfe Studio's Dressed to Kill and The Funhouse photoshoots to save money.

The trio followed up the horror themed Nightdreams with the post-apocalyptic science-fiction themed Café Flesh in 1982 with Sayadian as the director. The film had a budget of $100,000 and was made in two separate parts, using the non-pornographic elements of the film to attract financiers.

Nightdreams and Café Flesh were financially unsuccessful in the pornographic market, but they broke house records as midnight movies and replaced David Lynch's Eraserhead (1977) and John Waters' Pink Flamingos (1972) as they toured the country.

The April 1984 edition of Hustler featured a 21-page spread that Sayadian produced and directed in collaboration with musician Frank Zappa for his triple album Thing-Fish (1984). Flynt was going to pay for the production of a Broadway show based on the spread but reversed his decision when Thing-Fish did not result in increased magazine sales.

In 1989, Sayadian directed and co-wrote with Stahl the film Dr. Caligari, whose title is inspired by the 1920 film The Cabinet of Dr. Caligari. Made on a budget of $175,000, the film went on to become a midnight movie that found a cult following after it was released on home video.

Sayadian continued to write and direct surreal alt porn films as Rinse Dream, releasing a total of six feature length video releases between 1990 and 1993 before advanced cirrhosis impeded further work. Initially told by doctors that he had six months to live, Sayadian was seriously ill for over a decade before receiving a liver transplant in 2008.

== Filmography ==
- 1981: Nightdreams – film; co-writer and producer (as Rinse Dream)
- 1982: Café Flesh – film; co-writer and director (as Rinse Dream)
- 1987: "Do It Again" – music video for Wall of Voodoo; director
- 1989: Dr. Caligari – film; co-writer and director
- 1990: Nightdreams II – film; co-writer and director (as Rinse Dream)
- 1991: Party Doll A Go-Go – home video; writer and director (as Rinse Dream)
- 1991: Party Doll A Go-Go Part 2 – home video; writer and director (as Rinse Dream)
- 1991: Nightdreams 3 – home video; writer and director (as Rinse Dream)
- 1993: Untamed Cowgirls of the Wild West Part 1: The Pillowbiters – home video; writer and director (as Rinse Dream)
- 1993: Untamed Cowgirls of the Wild West Part 2: Jammy Glands from the Rio Grande – home video; writer and director (as Rinse Dream)
- 2015: The Art of the Sell: Stephen Sayadian – featurette included in the Criterion Collection's Blu-ray release of Dressed to Kill; commentator

== Awards ==
- 1984 AVN Award for Best Art Direction – Café Flesh
- 1992 XRCO Hall of Fame inductee – Nightdreams
- 2007 XRCO Hall of Fame inductee – Film Creator
- 2017 AVN Hall of Fame inductee – Director
