= Relative Fear =

1994 Canadian thriller film

- VHS cover
- Directed by: George Mihalka
- Written by: Kurt Wimmer
- Produced by: Tom Berry; Stefan Wodoslawsky; Franco Battista (co-producer); William Webb (executive producer)
- Starring: Matthew Dupuis; Darlanne Fluegel; James Brolin; Martin Neufeld; Bruce Dinsmore
- Cinematography: Rodney Gibbons
- Edited by: Ion Webster
- Music by: Marty Simon
- Distributed by: Norstar Entertainment; West Wind Entertainment; Allegro Films; Republic Pictures Home Video
- Release date: 1994
- Running time: 90-94 minutes
- Country: Canada
- Language: English

Relative Fear (also known as The Child and Le silence d'Adam) is a 1994 Canadian independent psychological horror film that references the 1956 film The Bad Seed. An autistic child is seemingly born to kill and does so.

== Cast ==
- Matthew Dupuis as Adam Pratman (Adam Madison)
- Darlanne Fluegel as Linda Pratman
- James Brolin as Det. Atwater
- Martin Neufeld as Peter Pratman
- Bruce Dinsmore as Clive (Gary Madison)
- M. Emmet Walsh as Earl Ladelle
- Michael Caloz as Manny Dorff
- Denise Crosby as Connie Madison
- Linda Sorenson as Margaret Ladelle
- Jason Blicker as Dennison
- Vlasta Vrána as Mr. Schulman
- Liz MacRae as Ms. Roark
- Gisèle Rousseau as Dr. Hoyer
- Jenny Campbell as Paige
- Frank Schorpion as Dr. Shane
- Alan West as Henry Pratman
- Victoria Barkoff as Ms. Smith
- Tyrone Benskin as Cop
- Roger E. Reid as Police Officer

== Reception ==
In the book Representing Autism: Culture, Narrative, Fascination, Stuart Murray describes the film as "the worst kind of example of the prosthetic narrative, where the idea of disability simply becomes part of a genetic method". He states that there is "little recognizably autistic in anything Adam does"
