= Siegfried Kracauer =

German writer (1889–1966)

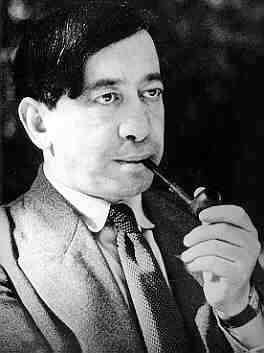
- A young Siegfried Kracauer
- Born: February 8, 1889; Frankfurt am Main, German Empire (present-day Germany)
- Died: November 26, 1966 (aged 77); New York City, United States
- Occupations: Journalist, sociologist, film theorist
- Writing career
- Notable work: From Caligari to Hitler (1947)
- Literary movement: Frankfurt School

Siegfried Kracauer (/ˈkrækaʊ.ər/; German: [ˈkʁakaʊɐ]; February 8, 1889 – November 26, 1966) was a German writer, journalist, sociologist, cultural critic, and film theorist. He has sometimes been associated with the Frankfurt School of critical theory. He is notable for arguing that realism is the most important function of cinema.

== Life and career ==
Born to a Jewish family in Frankfurt am Main, Kracauer studied architecture from 1907 to 1913, eventually obtaining a doctorate in engineering in 1914 and working as an architect in Osnabrück, Munich, and Berlin until 1920.

Near the end of the First World War, he befriended the young Theodor W. Adorno, to whom he became an early philosophical mentor. In 1964, Adorno recalled the importance of Kracauer's influence:

[f]or years Siegfried Kracauer read the Critique of Pure Reason with me regularly on Saturday afternoons. I am not exaggerating in the slightest when I say that I owe more to this reading than to my academic teachers. [...] If in my later reading of philosophical texts I was not so much impressed with their unity and systematic consistency as I was concerned with the play of forces at work under the surface of every closed doctrine and viewed the codified philosophies as force fields in each case, it was certainly Kracauer who impelled me to do so.

From 1922 to 1933 he worked as the leading film and literature editor of the Frankfurter Zeitung (a leading Frankfurt newspaper) as its correspondent in Berlin, where he worked alongside Walter Benjamin and Ernst Bloch, among others. Between 1923 and 1925, he wrote an essay entitled Der Detektiv-Roman (The Detective Novel), in which he concerned himself with phenomena from everyday life in modern society.

Kracauer continued this trend over the next few years, building up theoretical methods of analyzing circuses, photography, films, advertising, tourism, city layout. In 1927, he published the work Ornament der Masse (published in English as The Mass Ornament) which emphasizes the tremendous value of studying the masses and popular culture. His essays in Ornament der Masse shows Kracauer's fascination with popular culture, particularly within the capitalist society of the United States.

In 1930, Kracauer published Die Angestellten (The Salaried Masses), a critical look at the lifestyle and culture of the new class of white-collar employees. Spiritually homeless, and divorced from custom and tradition, these employees sought refuge in the new "distraction industries" of entertainment. Observers note that many of these lower-middle class employees were quick to adopt Nazism, three years later. In a contemporary review of Die Angestellten, Benjamin praised the concreteness of Kracauer's analysis, writing that "[t]he entire book is an attempt to grapple with a piece of everyday reality, constructed here and experienced now. Reality is pressed so closely that it is compelled to declare its colors and name names."

Kracauer became increasingly critical of capitalism (having read the works of Karl Marx) and eventually broke away from the Frankfurter Zeitung. About this same time (1930), he married Lili Ehrenreich. He was also very critical of Stalinism and the "terrorist totalitarianism" of the Soviet government.

With the rise of the Nazis in Germany in 1933, Kracauer migrated to Paris. In March 1941, thanks to the French ambassador Henri Hoppenot and his wife, Hélène Hoppenot, he emigrated to the United States, with other German refugees like John Rewald.

From 1941 to 1943 he worked in the Museum of Modern Art in New York City, supported by Guggenheim and Rockefeller scholarships for his work in German film. Eventually, he published From Caligari to Hitler: A Psychological History of the German Film (1947), which traces the birth of Nazism from the cinema of the Weimar Republic as well as helping lay the foundation of modern film criticism.

In 1960, he released Theory of Film: The Redemption of Physical Reality, which argued that realism is the most important function of cinema.

In the last years of his life Kracauer worked as a sociologist for different institutes, amongst them in New York as a director of research for applied social sciences at Columbia University. He died there, in 1966, from the consequences of pneumonia.

His last book is the posthumously published History, the Last Things Before the Last (New York, Oxford University Press, 1969).

== Theories on memory ==
Siegfried Kracauer's theories on memory revolved around the idea that memory was under threat and was being challenged by modern forms of technology. His most often cited example was the comparison of memory to photography. The reason for this comparison was that photography, in theory, replicates some of the tasks currently done by memory.

The differences in the functions of memory and the functions of photography, according to Kracauer, is that photography creates one fixed moment in time whereas memory itself is not beholden to a singular instance. Photography is capable of capturing the physicality of a particular moment, but it removes any depth or emotion that might otherwise be associated with the memory. In essence, photography cannot create a memory, but rather, it can create an artifact. Memory, on the other hand, is not beholden to one particular moment of time, nor is it purposefully created. Memories are impressions upon a person that they can recall due to the significance of the event or moment.

Photography can also work to record time in a linear way, and Kracauer even hints that floods of photographs ward off death by creating a sort of permanence. However, photography also excludes the essence of a person, and over time photographs lose meaning and become a "heap of details." This isn't to say that Kracauer felt that photography has no use for memory, it is simply that he felt that photography held more potential for historical memory than for personal memory. Photography allows for a depth of detail that can be to the advantage of a collective memory, such as how a city or town once appeared because those aspects can be forgotten, or overridden throughout time as the physical landscape of the area changes.

== Reception ==
Although he wrote for both popular and scholarly publications throughout much of his career, in the United States (and in English) he mainly concentrated on philosophical and sociological writings. This attracted some criticism from American scholars who found his style difficult to penetrate. At the time of his death in 1966, Kracauer was somewhat marginal in both American and German intellectual contexts. He had long ago abandoned writing in German, yet his research remained difficult to place within American scientific and academic categories.

In the decades following Kracauer's death, translations of his earlier essays and works, such as "The Mass Ornament," and the publication of his letters in German, revealed a fuller portrait of Kracauer's style and gradually brought greater recognition in the United States. His former colleague from Frankfurt, Leo Löwenthal, expressed pleasant surprise at the newfound fame that seemed to accumulate around Kracauer in his death. Since the 1980s and 1990s a new generation of film theorists and critics, including Gertrud Koch, Miriam Hansen, Tom Levin and Thomas Elsaesser have interpreted and introduced his work for a new generation of scholars.

== Works ==
- Kracauer, Siegfried (1928). Ginster.
- Kracauer, Siegfried (1947). From Caligari to Hitler.
- Kracauer, Siegfried (1960). Theory of Film: The Redemption of Physical Reality.
- Kracauer, Siegfried; Paul Oskar Kristeller (1969). History: The Last Things Before the Last.
- Kracauer, Siegfried (1971). Der Detektiv-Roman – Ein philosophischer Traktat.
- Kracauer, Siegfried (1973). Georg.
- Kracauer, Siegfried; Thomas Y. Levin (1995). The Mass Ornament: Weimar Essays.
- Kracauer, Siegfried; Quintin Hoare (1998). The Salaried Masses: Duty and Distraction in Weimar Germany.
- Kracauer, Siegfried; Gwenda David; Eric Moshbacher (2002). Jacques Offenbach and the Paris of His Time.
- Kracauer, Siegfried; Johannes von Moltke (2012). Siegfried Kracauer's American Writings: Essays on Film and Popular Culture.
- Kracauer, Siegfried; trans. Carl Skoggard (2016). Georg. ISBN 9781624621406

== See also ==
- Frankfurt School
- Exilliteratur
