= The Cabinet of Dr. Caligari =

1920 film by Robert Wiene

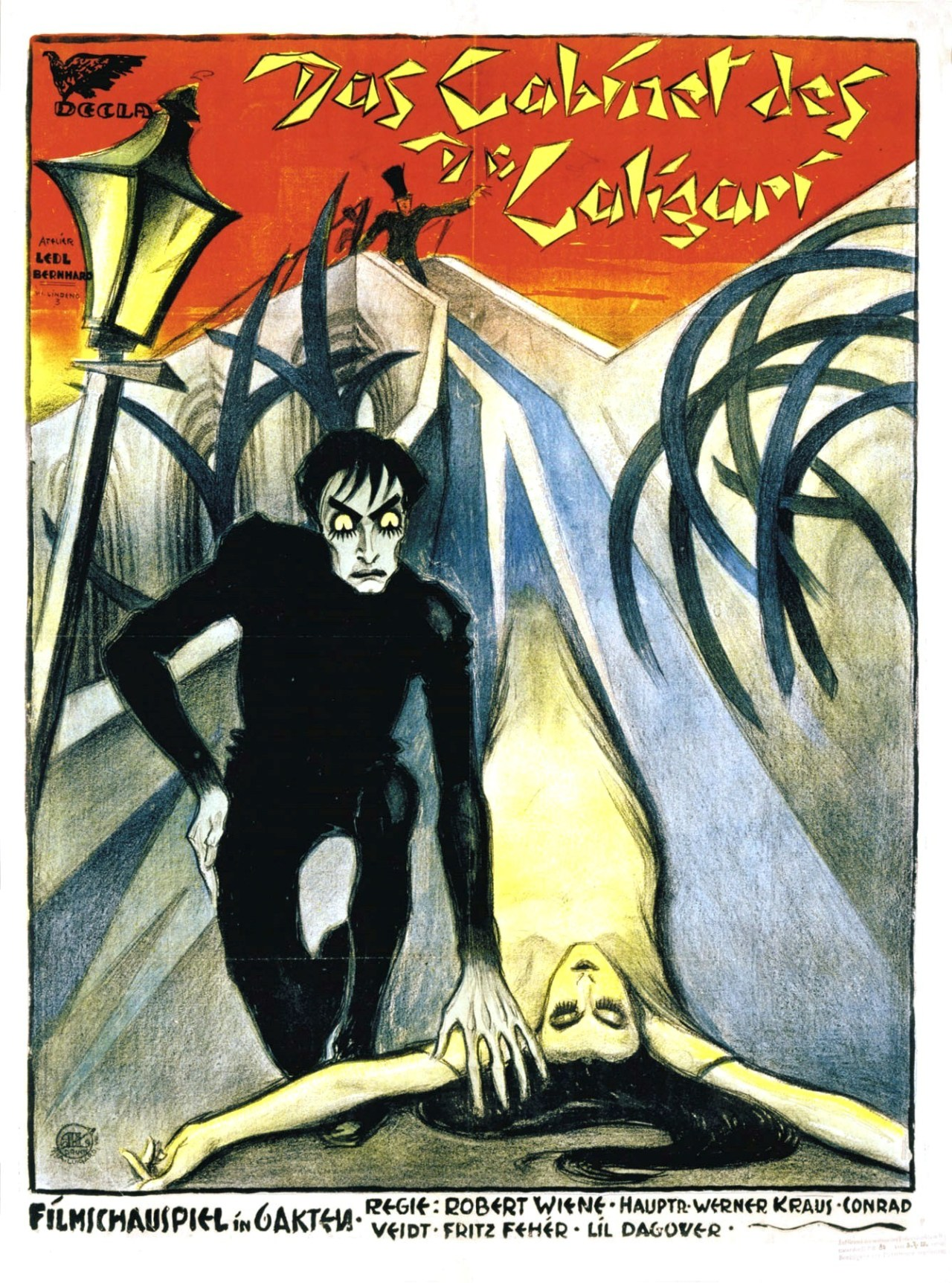
- Theatrical release poster
- Directed by: Robert Wiene
- Written by: Carl Mayer; Hans Janowitz
- Starring: Conrad Veidt; Werner Krauss; Friedrich Feher; Lil Dagover; Hans Heinrich von Twardowski; Rudolf Lettinger
- Cinematography: Willy Hameister
- Music by: Giuseppe Becce
- Production company: Decla-Film
- Release date: 26 February 1920 (Germany)
- Running time: 74 minutes
- Country: Germany
- Languages: Silent film; German intertitles
- Budget: $12,371 (Note: $18,000 in 1959 dollars or approximately $146,307 in 2024)

The Cabinet of Dr. Caligari (German: Das Cabinet des Dr. Caligari) is a 1920 German silent horror film directed by Robert Wiene and written by Hans Janowitz and Carl Mayer. The quintessential work of early German Expressionist cinema, it tells the story of a hypnotist (Werner Krauss) who uses a somnambulist Cesare (Conrad Veidt) to commit murders. The film features a dark, twisted visual style, with sharp-pointed forms; oblique, curving lines; structures and landscapes that lean and twist in unusual angles; and shadows and streaks of light painted directly onto the sets. The set design is "anti-realistic, claustrophobic" and "harsh" which is "coupled with feverish anxiety [that] entered the vocabulary of filmmakers and film viewers" particularly during the Weimar Republic, when this film was made.

The script was inspired by various experiences from the lives of Janowitz and Mayer, both pacifists who were left distrustful of authority after their experiences with the military during World War I. The film makes use of a frame story, with a prologue and epilogue combined with a twist ending. Janowitz said this device was forced upon the writers against their will. The film's design was handled by Hermann Warm, Walter Reimann and Walter Röhrig, who recommended a fantastic, graphic style over a naturalistic one.

The film thematises brutal and irrational authority. Writers and scholars have argued the film reflects a subconscious need in German society for a tyrant, and is an example of Germany's obedience to authority and unwillingness to rebel against deranged authority. Some critics have interpreted Caligari as representing the German war government, with Cesare symbolic of the common man conditioned, like soldiers, to kill. Other themes of the film include the destabilised contrast between insanity and sanity, the subjective perception of reality, and the duality of human nature.

The Cabinet of Dr. Caligari was released when foreign film industries were easing restrictions on the import of German films after World War I, so it was screened internationally. Accounts differ as to its financial and critical success upon release, but modern film critics and historians have largely praised it as a revolutionary film. The film was voted number 12 on the prestigious Brussels 12 list at the 1958 World Expo. Critic Roger Ebert called it arguably "the first true horror film", and reviewer Danny Peary called it cinema's first cult film and a precursor for arthouse films. The film helped draw worldwide attention to the artistic merit of German cinema, and had a major influence on American films, particularly in the genres of horror and film noir.

== Plot ==
The Cabinet of Dr. Caligari (1920)

In what appears to be a park, Franzis sits on a bench with an older man who complains that spirits have driven him away from his family and home. When a dazed woman passes them, Franzis explains she is his fiancée Jane and that they have suffered a great ordeal. The primary crux of the film is a flashback of Franzis' story, which takes place in Holstenwall, a shadowy town of twisted buildings and spiralling streets.

Franzis and his friend Alan, who are good-naturedly competing for Jane's affections, plan to visit the town fair. Meanwhile, a mysterious man named Dr. Caligari seeks a permit from the rude town clerk to present a spectacle at the fair, which features Cesare, a somnambulist. The clerk shouts at Caligari to wait, but ultimately approves the permit. That night, the clerk is stabbed to death in his bed.

The next morning, Franzis and Alan visit Caligari's sideshow attraction, where he opens a coffin-like box to reveal the sleeping Cesare. On Caligari's order, Cesare awakens and answers questions from the audience. Despite Franzis' protests, Alan asks, "How long shall I live?" To Alan's horror, Cesare answers, "Until dawn tomorrow." Later that night, a figure breaks into Alan's home and stabs him to death in his bed. A grief-stricken Franzis investigates Alan's murder with help from Jane and her father, Dr. Olsen, who obtains police authorisation to investigate the somnambulist. That night, the police apprehend a criminal in possession of a knife who is caught attempting to murder an elderly woman. When questioned by Franzis and Dr. Olsen, the criminal confesses he tried to kill the elderly woman, but denies any part in the two previous deaths; he was merely taking advantage of the situation to divert blame away from himself.

At night, Franzis spies on Caligari and observes what appears to be Cesare sleeping in his box. However, the real Cesare sneaks into Jane's home as she sleeps. He raises a knife to stab her, but instead abducts her after a struggle, dragging her through the window onto the street. Chased by an angry mob, Cesare eventually drops Jane and flees; he soon collapses and dies of exhaustion. Franzis confirms that the criminal who confessed to the elderly woman's murder is still locked away and could not have been Jane's attacker. Franzis and the police investigate Caligari's sideshow and discover that the "Cesare" sleeping in the box is only a dummy. Caligari escapes in the confusion. Franzis follows him and sees Caligari go into an insane asylum.

Upon further investigation, Franzis is shocked to learn that Caligari is the asylum's director. With help from the staff, Franzis studies the director's records and diary while the director sleeps. The writings reveal his obsession with the story of an 18th-century mystic named Caligari, who used a somnambulist named Cesare to commit murders in northern Italian towns. The director, attempting to understand the earlier Caligari, experiments on a somnambulist admitted to the asylum, who becomes his Cesare. The asylum director screams, "I must become Caligari!" After the flashback, Franzis and the doctors call the police to Caligari's office, where they show him Cesare's corpse. Caligari attacks one of the staff before he is subdued, restrained in a straitjacket, and becomes committed in his own asylum.

The narrative returns to the present, where Franzis' story concludes. In a twist ending, Franzis is depicted as an asylum inmate. Jane and Cesare are patients as well; Jane believes that she is a queen, while Cesare is not a somnambulist but awake, quiet, and not visibly dangerous. The man Franzis refers to as "Dr. Caligari" is the kind, benevolent asylum director. Franzis attacks him and is restrained in a straitjacket, then placed in the same cell where Caligari was confined in Franzis' story. The director announces that he now understands Franzis' delusion, and that he is confident he can cure him.

== Cast ==
- Conrad Veidt as Cesare
- Werner Krauss as Dr. Caligari
- Friedrich Feher as Franzis
- Lil Dagover as Jane Olsen
- Hans Heinrich von Twardowski as Alan
- Rudolf Lettinger as Dr. Olsen

== Production ==
=== Writing ===
The Cabinet of Dr. Caligari was written by Hans Janowitz and Carl Mayer, both of whom were pacifists by the time they met following World War I. Janowitz served as an officer during the war, but the experience left him embittered with the military, which affected his writing. Mayer feigned madness to avoid military service during the war, which led him to intense examinations from a military psychiatrist. The experience left him distrustful of authority, and the psychiatrist served as a model for the Caligari character. Janowitz and Mayer were introduced in June 1918 by a mutual friend, actor Ernst Deutsch. Both writers were penniless at the time. Gilda Langer, an actress with whom Mayer was in love, encouraged Janowitz and Mayer to write a film together. She later became the basis for the Jane character. Langer also encouraged Janowitz to visit a fortune teller, who predicted that Janowitz would survive his military service during the war, but Langer would die. This prediction proved true, as Langer died unexpectedly in 1920 at the age of 23, and Janowitz said it inspired the scene in which Cesare predicts Alan's death at the fair.

Although neither had any associations with the film industry, Janowitz and Mayer wrote a script over six weeks during the winter of 1918–19. In describing their roles, Janowitz called himself "the father who planted the seed, and Mayer the mother who conceived and ripened it". The Expressionist filmmaker Paul Wegener was among their influences. The story was partially inspired by a circus sideshow the two visited on Kantstrasse in Berlin, called "Man or Machine?", in which a man performed feats of great strength after becoming hypnotised. They first visualised the story of Caligari the night of that show. Several of Janowitz's past experiences influenced his writing, including memories of his hometown of Prague, and, as he put it, a mistrust of "the authoritative power of an inhuman state gone mad" due to his military service. Janowitz also believed he had witnessed a murder in 1913 near an amusement park on Hamburg's Reeperbahn, beside the Holstenwall, which served as another inspiration for the script. According to Janowitz, he observed a woman disappear into some bushes, from which a respectable-looking man emerged a few moments later, and the next day Janowitz learned the girl was murdered. Holstenwall later became the name of the town setting in Caligari.

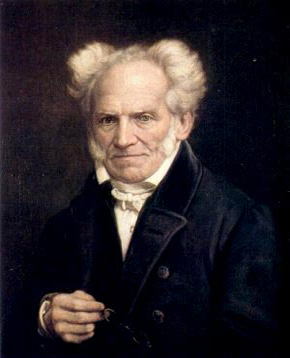
The physical appearance of the Caligari character (left) was inspired by portraits of the German philosopher Arthur Schopenhauer (right).

Janowitz and Mayer are said to have set out to write a story denouncing arbitrary authority as brutal and insane. Janowitz said it was only years after the film was released that he realised exposing the "authoritative power of an inhuman state" was the "subconscious intention" of the writers. Hermann Warm, who designed the film's sets, said Mayer had no political intentions when he wrote the film. Film historian David Robinson noted that Janowitz did not refer to anti-authority intentions in the script until many decades after Caligari was released, and he suggested Janowitz's recollection may have changed in response to later interpretations of the film.

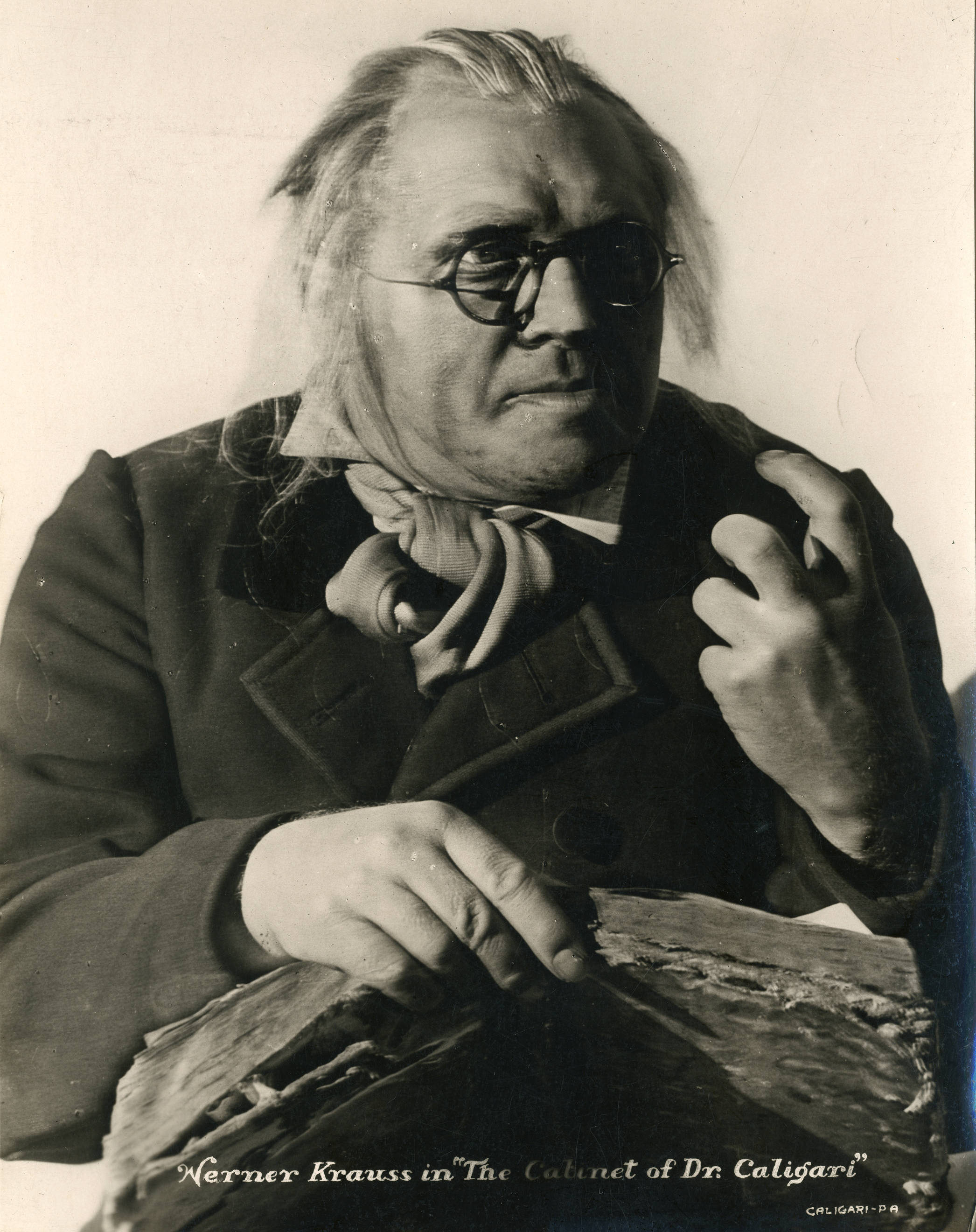
Werner Krauss as Caligari, 1920

The film they wrote was entitled Das Cabinet des Dr. Caligari, using the English spelling Cabinet rather than the German Kabinett. The completed script contained 141 scenes. Janowitz has claimed the name Caligari, which was not settled upon until after the script was finished, was inspired by a rare book called Unknown Letters of Stendhal, which featured a letter from the French novelist Stendhal referring to a French officer named Caligari he met at the La Scala theatre in Milan. However, no record of any such letter exists, and film historian John D. Barlow suggested Janowitz may have fabricated the story. The physical appearance of Caligari was inspired by portraits of the German philosopher Arthur Schopenhauer. The character's name is spelled Calligaris in the only known surviving script, although in some instances the final s is removed. Other character names are also spelled differently from the final film: Cesare appears as Caesare, Alan is Allan or sometimes Alland and Dr. Olsen is Dr. Olfens. Likewise, unnamed characters in the final film have names in the script, including the town clerk ("Dr. Lüders") and the house-breaker ("Jakob Straat").

The story of Caligari is told abstractly, like a fairy tale, and includes little description about or attention toward the psychological motivations of the characters, which is more heavily emphasised in the film's visual style. The original script shows few traces of the Expressionist influence prevalent in the film's sets and costumes. Through film director Fritz Lang, Janowitz and Mayer met with Erich Pommer, head of production at the Decla-Film studio in Weissensee, on 19 April 1919, to discuss selling the script. According to Pommer, he attempted to get rid of them, but they persisted until he agreed to meet with them. Pommer reportedly asked the writers to leave the script with him, but they refused, and instead Mayer read it aloud to him. Pommer and his assistant, Julius Sternheim, were so impressed that he refused to let them leave until a contract was signed, and he purchased the script from them that night. The writers had originally sought no fewer than 10,000 marks, but were given 3,500, with the promise of another 2,000 once the film went into production and 500 if it was sold for foreign release, which the producers considered unlikely. The contract, today preserved at Berlin's Bundesfilmarchiv, gave Pommer the right to make any changes to the script deemed appropriate. Pommer said he was drawn to the script because he believed it could be filmed inexpensively, and it bore similarities to films inspired by the macabre horror shows of the Grand Guignol theatre in Paris, which were popular at the time. Pommer later said: "They saw in the script an 'experiment'. I saw a relatively cheap film".

==== Frame story ====
The Cabinet of Dr. Caligari makes use of a Rahmenerzählung, or frame story; a prologue and epilogue establish the main body of the film as a delusional flashback, a novel technique. Lang has said that, during early discussions about his possible involvement with the film, he suggested the addition of an opening scene with a "normal" style, which would lead the public into the rest of the film without confusion. It remains unclear whether Lang suggested the frame story structure or simply gave advice on how to write a frame story that was already agreed, and some writers, like David Robinson, have questioned whether Lang's recollection is correct. The director, Robert Wiene, was supportive of the changes. Janowitz has said he and Mayer were not privy to discussions about adding the frame story and strongly opposed its inclusion, believing it had deprived the film of its revolutionary and political significance; he wrote that it was "an illicit violation, a raping of our work" that turned the film "into a cliché ... in which the symbolism was to be lost". Janowitz says the writers sought legal action to stop the change but failed. He also says they did not see the finished film with the frame story until a preview was shown to studio heads, after which the writers "expressed our dissatisfaction in a storm of thunderous remonstrances". They had to be persuaded not to publicly protest against the film.

In his 1947 book From Caligari to Hitler, Siegfried Kracauer argued, based largely on an unpublished typescript written and provided by Janowitz, that the film originally included no frame story and started with the fair coming to town and ended with Caligari becoming institutionalised. Kracauer argued that the frame story glorified authority and was added to turn a "revolutionary" film into a "conformistic" one. No surviving copies of the script were believed to exist until the early 1950s when actor Werner Krauss revealed he still had his copy. He refused to part with it; only in 1978, two decades after his death, was it purchased by the German film archive Deutsche Kinemathek. It remained unavailable for public consumption until 1995, when a full transcript was published.

The script revealed that a frame story was part of the original Caligari screenplay, albeit a different one from that in the film. The original manuscript opens on an elegant terrace of a large villa, where Franzis and Jane are hosting a party and the guests insist that Franzis tell them a story that happened to him 20 years earlier. The conclusion to the frame story is missing from the script. Critics widely agree that the discovery of the screenplay strongly undermines Kracauer's theory, with some, like the German film historian Stephen Brockmann, even arguing it disproves his claims altogether. Others, like John D. Barlow, argue that it does not settle the issue, as the original screenplay's frame story simply serves to introduce the main plot, rather than subvert it as the final film's version does.

=== Development ===
Many details about the making of The Cabinet of Dr. Caligari are in dispute and will probably remain unsettled due to the large number of people involved in the making of the film, many of whom recalled it differently or dramatised their own contributions to its production. Production of the film was delayed about four or five months after the script was purchased. Pommer originally chose Lang as the director of Caligari, and Lang even went so far as to hold preparatory discussions about the script with Janowitz, but he became unavailable due to his involvement with the filming of The Spiders, so Wiene was selected instead. According to Janowitz, Wiene's father, a successful theatre actor, had "gone slightly mad when he could no longer appear on the stage", and Janowitz believed that experience helped Wiene bring an "intimate understanding" to the source material of Caligari.

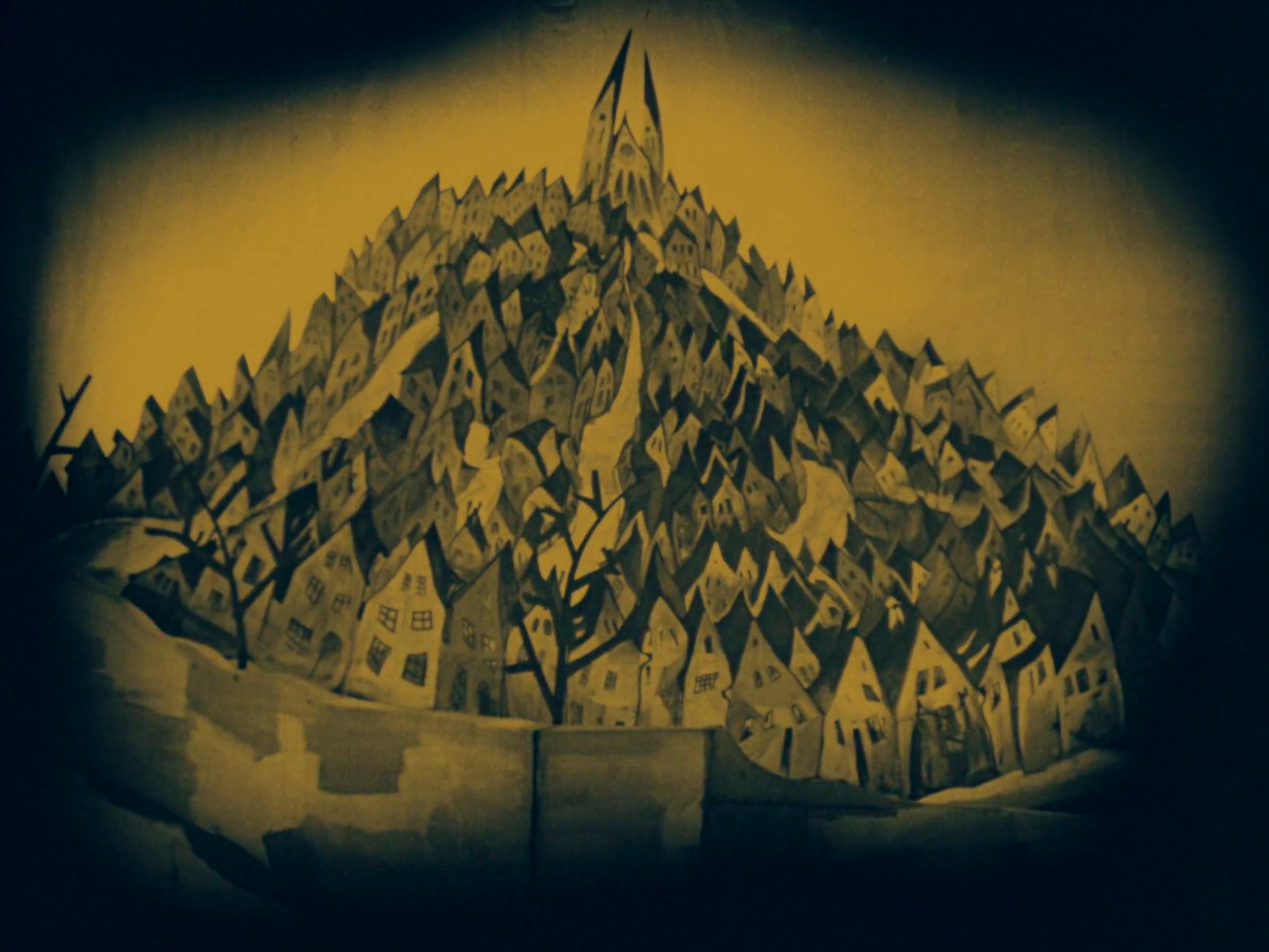
The designers of The Cabinet of Dr. Caligari chose a fantastic, graphic visual style instead of a naturalistic one; this included twisted city scenes that were painted directly onto canvases.

Decla producer Rudolf Meinert introduced Hermann Warm to Wiene and provided Warm with the Caligari script, asking him to come up with proposals for the design. Warm believed "films must be drawings brought to life", and felt a naturalistic set was wrong for the subject of the film, instead recommending a fantastic, graphic style, in which the images would be visionary, nightmarish and out of the ordinary. Warm brought to the project his two friends, painters and stage designers Walter Reimann and Walter Röhrig, both of whom were associated with the Berlin art and literary magazine Der Sturm. The trio spent a full day and part of the night reading the script, after which Reimann suggested an Expressionist style, a style often used in his own paintings. They also conceived the idea of painting forms and shadows directly onto the sets to ensure a dark and unreal look. According to Warm, the three approached Wiene with the idea and he immediately agreed, although Wiene has made claims that he conceived the film's Expressionist style. Meinert agreed to the idea after one day's consideration, telling Warm, Reimann and Röhrig to make the sets as "crazy" and "eccentrically" as possible. He embraced the idea for commercial, not aesthetic reasons: Expressionism was fashionable at the time, so he concluded even if the film received bad reviews, the artistic style would garner attention and make it profitable.

Wiene filmed a test scene to demonstrate Warm, Reimann and Röhrig's theories, and it so impressed the producers that the artists were given free rein. Pommer later said he was responsible for placing Warm, Reimann and Röhrig in charge of the sets, but Warm has claimed that, although Pommer was in charge of production at Decla when Caligari was made, he was not actually a producer on the film itself. Instead, he says Meinert was the film's true producer, and that it was he who gave Warm the manuscript. Warm claimed Meinert produced the film "despite the opposition of a part of the management of Decla". Meinert said Pommer had "not sanctioned" the film's abstract visual style. Nevertheless, Pommer claimed to have supervised Caligari, and that the film's Expressionistic style was chosen in part to differentiate it from competing Hollywood films. The predominant attitude at the time was that artistic achievement led to success in exports to foreign film markets. The dominance of Hollywood at the time, coupled with a period of inflation and currency devaluation, forced German film studios to seek projects that could be made inexpensively, with a combination of realistic and artistic elements so the films would be accessible to American audiences, yet also distinctive from Hollywood films. Pommer has claimed while Mayer and Janowitz expressed a desire for artistic experimentation in the film, his decision to use painted canvases as scenery was primarily a commercial one, as they would be a significant financial saving over building sets.

Janowitz claims he attempted to commission the sets from designer and engraver Alfred Kubin, known for his heavy use of light and shadow to create a sense of chaos, but Kubin declined to participate in the project because he was too busy. In a conflicting story, however, Janowitz claimed he requested from Decla "Kubin paintings", and that they misread his instructions as "cubist painters" and hired Reimann and Röhrig as a result. David Robinson argues this story was probably an embellishment stemming from Janowitz's disdain for the two artists. Janowitz has claimed that he and Mayer conceived the idea of painting the sets on canvas, and that the shooting script included written directions that the scenery be designed in Kubin's style. However, the later rediscovery of the original screenplay refutes this claim, as it includes no such directions about the sets. This was also disputed in a 1926 article by Barnet Braverman in Billboard magazine, which claimed the script included no mention of an unconventional visual style, and that Janowitz and Mayer in fact strongly opposed the stylisation. She claims Mayer later came to appreciate the visual style, but that Janowitz remained opposed to it years after the film's release.

The set design, costumes and props took about two weeks to prepare. Warm worked primarily on the sets, while Röhrig handled the painting and Reimann was responsible for the costumes. Robinson noted the costumes in Caligari seem to resemble a wide variety of time periods. For example, Caligari and the fairground workers' costumes resemble the Biedermeier era, while Jane's embody Romanticism. Additionally, Robinson wrote, Cesare's costume and those of policemen in the film appear abstract, while many of the other characters' seem like ordinary German clothes from the 1920s. The collaborative nature of the film's production highlights the importance that both screenwriters and set designers held in German cinema of the 1920s, although film critic Lotte H. Eisner said sets held more importance than anything else in German films at that time. The Cabinet of Dr. Caligari was the first German Expressionist film, although Brockmann and film critic Mike Budd claim it was also influenced by German Romanticism; Budd notes the film's themes of insanity and the outcry against authority are common among German Romanticism in literature, theatre and the visual arts. Film scholar Vincent LoBrutto said the theatre of Max Reinhardt and the artistic style of Die Brücke were additional influences on Caligari.

=== Casting ===
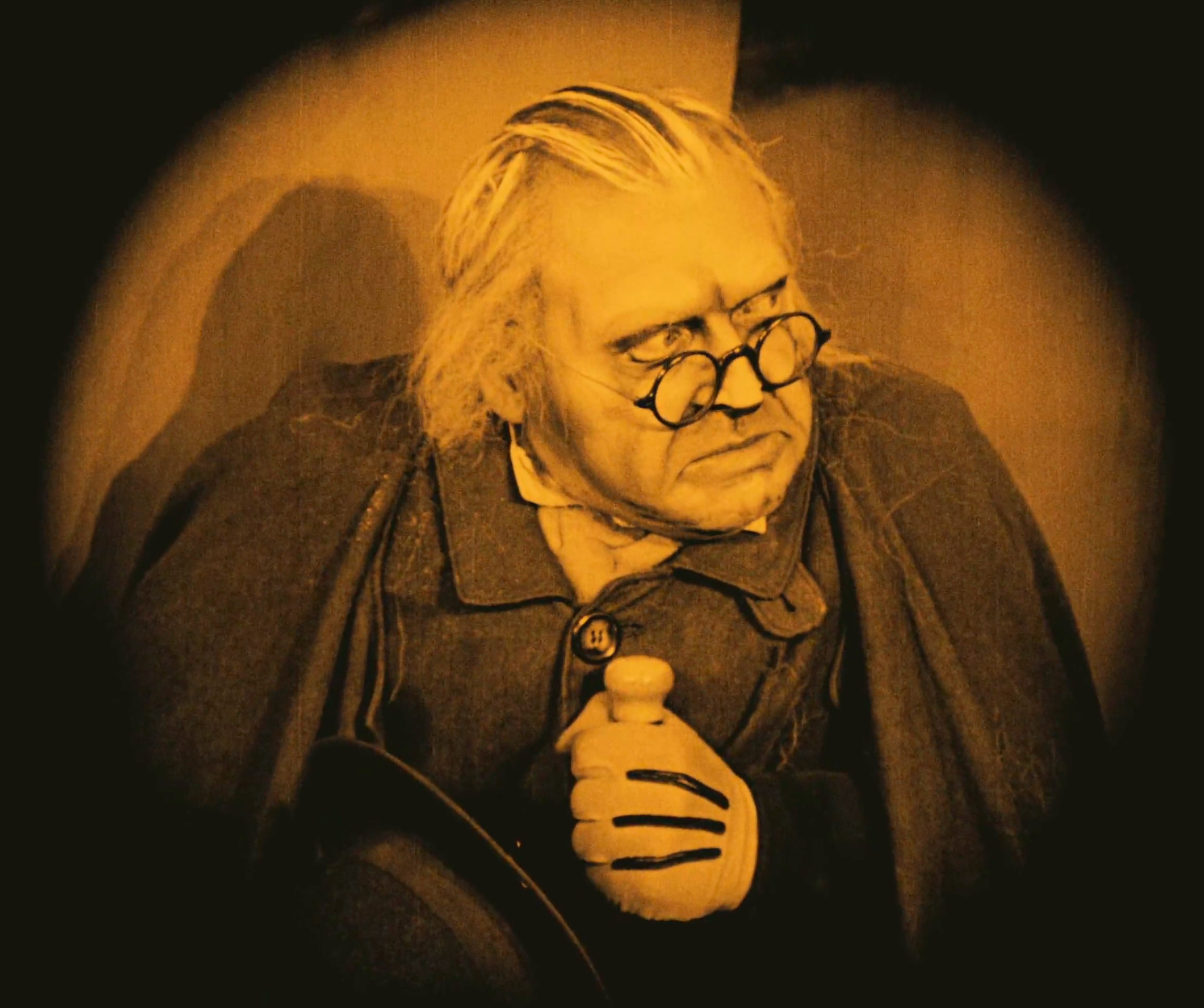
Werner Krauss, who portrayed Caligari, suggested changes to his own make-up and costumes so they would match the film's Expressionist style.

Janowitz originally intended the part of Cesare to go to his friend, actor Ernst Deutsch. Mayer wrote the part of Jane for Gilda Langer, but by the time the film was cast Langer's interests had moved on from Janowitz and Mayer to director Paul Czinner, leaving the role to be played by Lil Dagover. Janowitz claimed he wrote the part of Caligari specifically for Werner Krauss, whom Deutsch had brought to his attention during rehearsals for a Max Reinhardt play; Janowitz said only Krauss or Paul Wegener could have played the part. The parts of Caligari and Cesare ultimately went to Krauss and Conrad Veidt, respectively, who enthusiastically took part in many aspects of the production. Krauss suggested changes to his own make-up and costumes, including the elements of a top hat, cape and walking stick with an ivory handle for his character. The actors in Caligari were conscious of the need to adapt their make-up, costumes and appearance to match the visual style of the film. Much of the acting in German silent films at the time was already Expressionistic, mimicking the pantomimic aspects of Expressionist theatre. The performances of Krauss and Veidt in Caligari were typical of this style, as they both had experience in Expressionist-influenced theatre, and as a result, John D. Barlow said they appear more comfortable in their surroundings in the film than the other actors. Prior to filming, Kraus and Veidt appeared on stage in the winter of 1918 in an Expressionist drama, Reinhold Goering's Seeschlacht, at the Deutsches Theater. By contrast, Dagover had little experience in Expressionist theatre, and Barlow argues her acting is less harmonious with the film's visual style.

Wiene asked the actors to make movements similar to dance, most prominently from Veidt, but also from Krauss, Dagover and Friedrich Feger, who played Franzis. Krauss and Veidt are the only actors whose performances fully match the stylisation of the sets, which they achieved by concentrating their movements and facial expressions. Barlow notes that "Veidt moves along the wall as if it had 'exuded' him ... more a part of a material world of objects than a human one", and Krauss "moves with angular viciousness, his gestures seem broken or cracked by the obsessive force within him, a force that seems to emerge from a constant toxic state, a twisted authoritarianism of no human scruple and total insensibility". Most of the other actors besides Krauss and Veidt have a more naturalistic style. Alan, Jane and Franzis play the roles of an idyllically happy trio enjoying youth; Alan in particular represents the archetype of a sensitive 19th-century student. Mike Budd points out realist characters in stylised settings are a common characteristic in Expressionist theatre. However, David Robinson notes even the performances of the more naturalistic supporting roles in Caligari have Expressionist elements, like Hans-Heinz von Twardowski's "strange, tormented face" as Alan. He also cites Feher's "large angular movements", especially in the scene where he searches the deserted fairground. Other minor roles are Expressionistic in nature, like two policemen who sit facing each other at their desks and move with exaggerated symmetry, and two servants who awaken and rise from their beds in perfect synchronisation. Vincent LoBrutto said of the acting in the film:

The acting style is as emotionally over-the-top as the narrative and visual style of The Cabinet of Dr. Caligari. The behavior of the characters represents the actors' emotional responses to the expressionistic environment and the situations in which they find themselves. Staging and movement of the actors respond to the hysteria of Caligari's machinations and to the fun-house labyrinth that appears to be the reflection of a crazy mirror, not an orderly village.

=== Filming ===
Shooting for The Cabinet of Dr. Caligari began at the end of December 1919 and concluded at the end of January 1920. It was shot entirely in a studio without any exterior shots, which was unusual for films of the time, but dictated by the decision to give the film an Expressionist visual style. The extent to which Mayer and Janowitz participated during filming is disputed: Janowitz claims the duo repeatedly refused to allow any script changes during production, and Pommer claimed Mayer was on the set for every day of filming. Hermann Warm, however, claimed they were never present for any of the shooting or involved in any discussions during production.

Caligari was filmed in the Lixie-Film studio (formerly owned by Continental-Kunstfilm) at 9 Franz Joseph-Strasse (now Liebermannstraße), Weißensee, a north-eastern suburb of Berlin. Decla had been making films at the Lixie studio since October 1919, having previously released three titles, The Plague of Florence (Die Pest in Florenz) (1919) and the two parts of The Spiders (Die Spinnen). The relatively small size of the studio (built some five years earlier in 1914) meant most of the sets used in the film did not exceed six metres (20 ft) in width and depth. Certain elements from the original script had to be cut from the film due to the limited space, including a procession of gypsies, a handcart pushed by Caligari, Jane's carriage, and a chase scene involving horse-cabs. Likewise, the script called for a fairground scene with roundabouts, barrel organs, sideshow barkers, performers and menageries, none of which could be achieved in the restrictive space. Instead, the scenes use a painting of the Holstenwall town as a background; throngs of people walk around two spinning merry-go-round props, which creates the impression of a carnival. The script also made references to modern elements like telephones, telegrams and electric light, but they were eliminated during the filming, leaving the final film's setting with no indication of a specific time period.

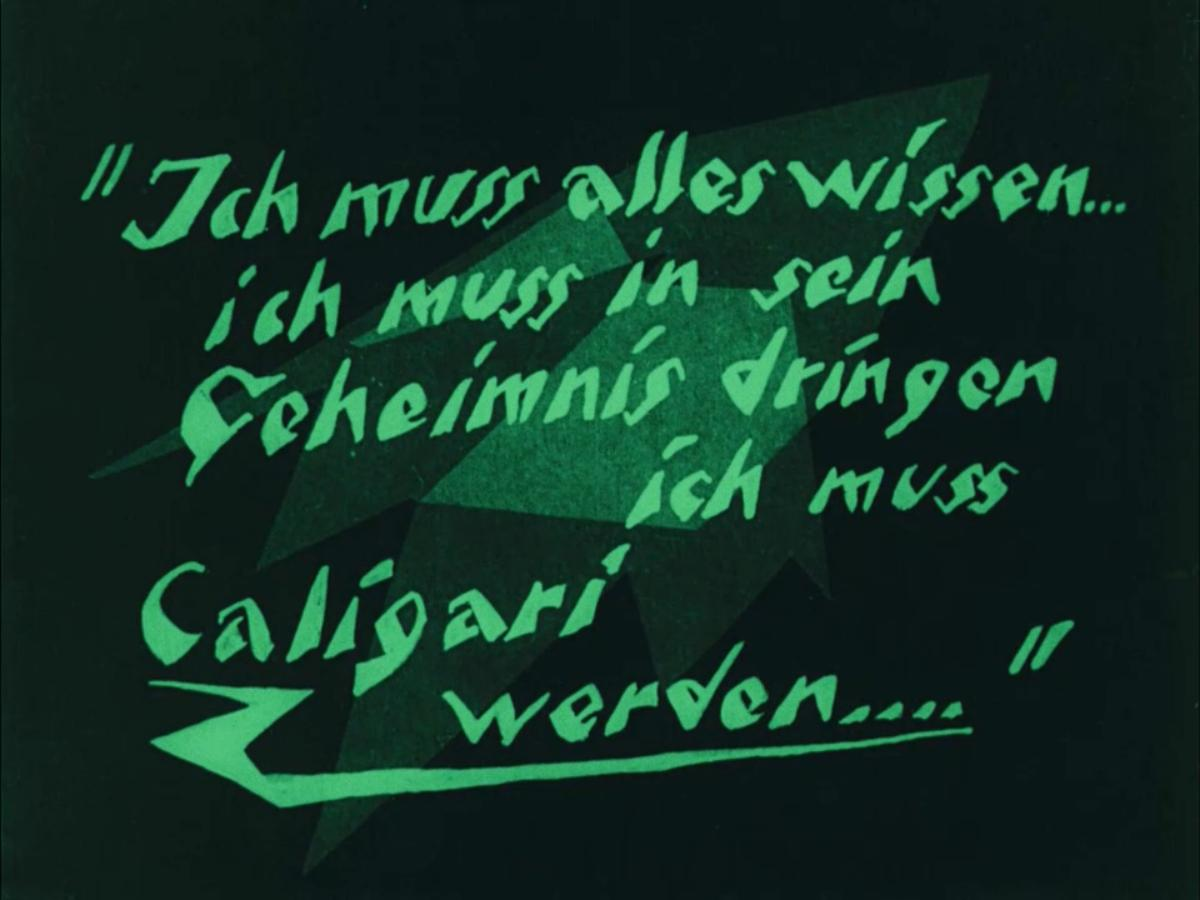
The Cabinet of Dr. Caligari used stylised intertitles.

Several scenes from the script were cut during filming, most of which were brief time lapses or transitioning scenes, or title screens deemed unnecessary. One of the more substantial scenes to be cut involved the ghost of Alan at a cemetery. The scene with the town clerk berating Caligari deviated notably from the original script, which simply called for the clerk to be "impatient". He is far more abusive in the scene as it was filmed, and is perched atop an exaggeratedly high bench that towers over Caligari. Another deviation from the script comes when Caligari first awakens Cesare, one of the most famous moments in the film. The script called for Cesare to gasp and struggle for air, then shake violently and collapse in Caligari's arms. As it was filmed, there is no such physical struggling, and instead the camera zooms in on Cesare's face as he gradually opens his eyes. The original title cards for Caligari featured stylised, misshapen lettering with excessive underlinings, exclamation points and occasionally archaic spellings. The bizarre style, which matches that of the film as a whole, mimics the lettering of Expressionistic posters at the time. The original title cards were tinted in green, steely-blue and brown. Many modern prints of the film do not preserve the original lettering.

Photography was provided by Willy Hameister, who went on to work with Wiene on several other films. The camerawork in Caligari is fairly simple and is used primarily to show the sets, mostly alternating between medium shots and straight-on angles, with occasionally abrupt close-ups to create a sense of shock. There are few long shots or panning movement within the cinematography. Likewise, there is very little interscene editing. Most scenes follow the other without intercutting, which gives Caligari more of a theatrical feel than a cinematic one. Heavy lighting is typically absent from the film, heightening the sense of darkness prevalent in the story. However, lighting is occasionally used to intensify the uneasiness created by the distortions of the sets. For example, when Cesare first awakens at the fair, a light is shone directly on a close-up of his heavily made-up face to create an unsettling glow. Additionally, lighting is used in a then-innovative way to cast a shadow against the wall during the scene in which Cesare kills Alan, so the viewer sees only the shadow and not the figures themselves. Lighting techniques like this became frequently used in later German films.

== Visual style ==
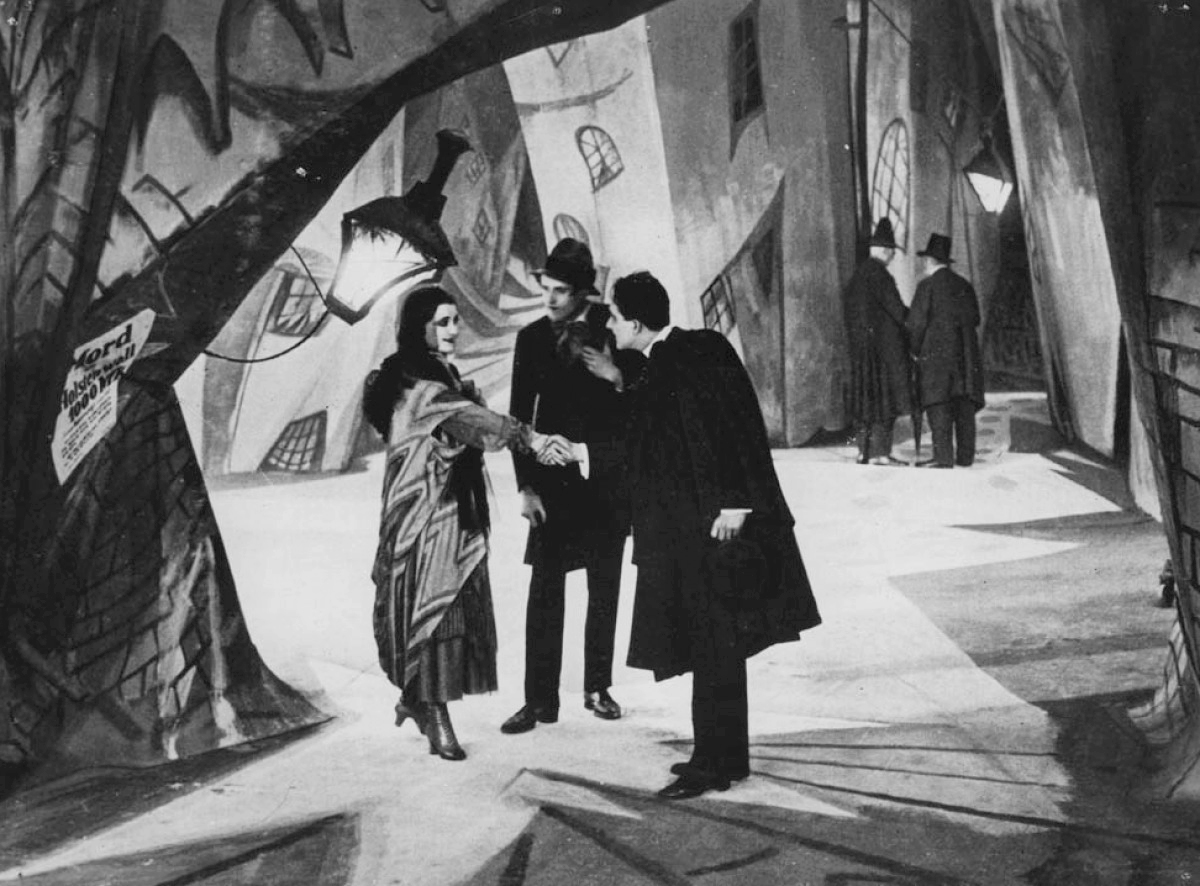
The visual style of The Cabinet of Dr. Caligari included deliberately distorted forms, and shadows and streaks of light painted directly onto the sets.

The visual style of The Cabinet of Dr. Caligari is dark, twisted and bizarre; radical and deliberate distortions in perspective, form, dimension and scale create a chaotic and unhinged appearance. The sets are dominated by sharp-pointed forms and oblique and curving lines, with narrow and spiralling streets, and structures and landscapes that lean and twist in unusual angles, giving the impression they could collapse or explode at any given moment. Film critic Roger Ebert described it as "a jagged landscape of sharp angles and tilted walls and windows, staircases climbing crazy diagonals, trees with spiky leaves, grass that looks like knives". The sets are characterised by strokes of bold, black paint. The landscape of Holstenwall is painted on canvas, as opposed to a constructed set, and shadows and streaks of light are painted directly onto the sets, further distorting the viewer's sense of perspective and three-dimensionality. Buildings are clustered and interconnected in a cubist-like architecture, surrounded by dark and twisted back alleys. Lotte H. Eisner, author of The Haunted Screen, writes that objects in the film appear as if they are coming alive and "seem to vibrate with an extraordinary spirituality". Rudolf Kurtz, screenwriter and author of Expressionismus und Film, likewise wrote "the dynamic force of objects howls their desire to be created". The rooms have radically offset windows with distorted frames, doors that are not squared, and chairs that are too tall. Strange designs and figures are painted on the walls of corridors and rooms, and trees outside have twisted branches that sometimes resemble tentacles.

German film professor Anton Kaes wrote, "The style of German Expressionism allowed the filmmakers to experiment with filmic technology and special effects and to explore the twisted realm of repressed desires, unconscious fears, and deranged fixations". The visual style of Caligari conveys a sense of anxiety and terror to the viewer, giving the impression of a nightmare or deranged sensibility, or a place transformed by evil, in a more effective way than realistic locations or conventional design concepts could. Siegfried Kracauer wrote that the settings "amounted to a perfect transformation of material objects into emotional ornaments". The majority of the film's story and scenes are memories recalled by an insane narrator, and as a result the distorted visual style takes on the quality of his mental breakdown, giving the viewers the impression that they are inside the mind of a madman. As with contemporary Expressionist paintings, the visual style of Caligari reflects an emotional reaction to the world, and the film's characters represent an emotional response to the terror of society as embodied by Caligari and Cesare. Often in the film, set pieces are emblematic of the emotional state of the characters in the scene. For example, the courtyard of the insane asylum during the frame story is vastly out of proportion. The characters seem too big for the small building, and the courtyard floor features a bizarre pattern, all of which represent the patients' damaged frames of mind. Likewise, the scene with the criminal in a prison cell features a set with long vertical painted shadows resembling arrowheads, pointing down at the squatting prisoner in an oppressive effect that symbolises his broken-down state.

Stephen Brockmann argues the fact that Caligari was filmed entirely in a studio enhances the madness portrayed by the film's visuals because "there is no access to a natural world beyond the realm of the tortured human psyche". The sets occasionally feature circular images that reflect the chaos of the film, presenting patterns of movement that seem to be going nowhere, such as the merry-go-round at the fair, moving at a tilted angle that makes it appear at risk of collapsing. Other elements of the film convey the same visual motifs as the sets, including the costumes and make-up design for Caligari and Cesare, both of which are highly exaggerated and grotesque. Even the hair of the characters is an Expressionistic design element, especially Cesare's black, spiky, jagged locks. They are the only two characters in the film with Expressionistic make-up and costumes, making them appear as if they are the only ones who truly belong in this distorted world. Despite their apparent normalcy, however, Franzis and the other characters never appear disturbed by the madness around them reflected in the sets; they instead react as if they are parts of a normal background.

A select few scenes disrupt the Expressionistic style of the film, such as in Jane's and Alan's homes, which include normal backgrounds and bourgeois furniture that convey a sense of security and tranquility otherwise absent from the film. Eisner called this a "fatal" continuity error, but John D. Barlow disagrees, arguing it is a common characteristic for dream narratives to have some normal elements in them, and that the normalcy of Jane's house in particular could represent the feeling of comfort and refuge Franzis feels in her presence. Mike Budd argues while the Expressionistic visual style is jarring and off-putting at first, the characters start to blend more harmoniously as the film progresses, and the setting becomes more relegated into the background.

Robinson suggested Caligari is not a true example of Expressionism at all, but simply a conventional story with some elements of the art form applied to it. He argues the story itself is not Expressionistic, and the film could have easily been produced in a traditional style, but that Expressionist-inspired visuals were applied to it as decoration. Similarly, Budd has called the film a conventional, classical narrative, resembling a detective story in Franzis's search to expose Alan's killer, and said it is only the film's Expressionist settings that make the film transgressive. Hans Janowitz has entertained similar thoughts as well: "Was this particular style of painting only a garment in which to dress the drama? Was it only an accident? Would it not have been possible to change this garment, without injury to the deep effect of the drama? I do not know."

== Release ==
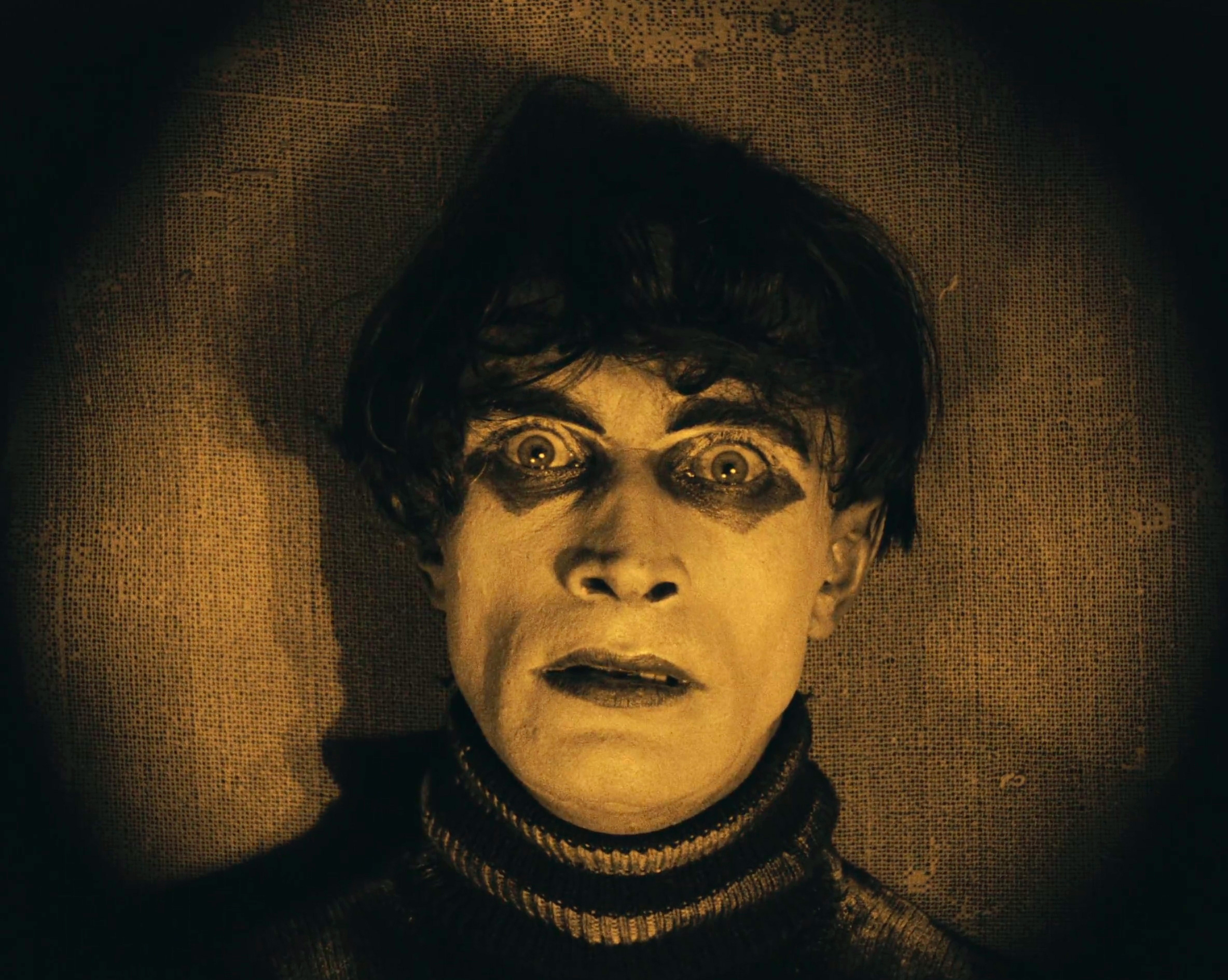
The premiere of The Cabinet of Dr. Caligari was so successful that women in the audience were said to have screamed during the scene in which Cesare (Conrad Veidt) is revealed.

Though often considered an art film by some modern critics and scholars, Caligari was produced and marketed the same way as a normal commercial production of its time period, able to target both the elite artistic market as well as a more commercial horror genre audience. The film was marketed extensively leading up to the release, and advertisements ran even before the film was finished. Many posters and newspaper advertisements included the enigmatic phrase featured in the film, "Du musst Caligari werden!", or "You must become Caligari!" Caligari premiered at the Marmorhaus theatre in Berlin on 26 February 1920, less than one month after it was completed. The filmmakers were so nervous about the release that Erich Pommer, on his way to the theatre, reportedly exclaimed, "It will be a horrible failure for all of us!" As with the making of the film, several urban legends surround the film's premiere. One, offered by writers Roger Manvell and Heinrich Fraenkel in The German Cinema, suggests the film was shelved "for lack of a suitable outlet", and was only shown at Marmorhaus because another film had fallen through. Another suggested the theatre pulled the film after only two performances because audiences demanded refunds and demonstrated against it so strongly. This story was told by Pommer, who claimed the Marmorhaus picked Caligari back up and ran it successfully for three months after he spent six months working on a publicity campaign for the film. David Robinson wrote that neither of these urban legends were true, and that the latter was fabricated by Pommer to increase his own reputation. On the contrary, Robinson said the premiere was highly successful, showing at the theatre for four weeks, an unusual amount for the time, and then returning two weeks later. He said it was so well received that women in the audience screamed when Cesare opened his eyes during his first scene, and fainted during the scene in which Cesare abducts Jane.

Caligari was released at a time when foreign film industries had just started easing restrictions on the import of German films following World War I. The film was acquired for American distribution by the Goldwyn Distributing Company, and had its American premiere at the Capitol Theatre in New York City on 3 April 1921. It was given a live theatrical prologue and epilogue, which was not unusual for film premieres at major theatres at the time. In the prologue, the film is introduced by a character called "Cranford", who identifies himself as the man Franzis speaks with in the opening scene. In the epilogue, Cranford returns and exclaims that Franzis has fully recovered from his madness. Mike Budd believes these additions simplified the film and "adjusted [it] for mass consumption", though Robinson argued it was simply a normal theatrical novelty for the time. Capitol Theatre manager Samuel Roxy Rothafel commissioned conductor Ernö Rapée to compile a musical accompaniment that included portions of songs by composers Johann Strauss III, Arnold Schoenberg, Claude Debussy, Igor Stravinsky and Sergei Prokofiev. Rotafel wanted the score to match the dark mood of the film, saying: "The music had, as it were, to be made eligible for citizenship in a nightmare country".

Caligari had its Los Angeles premiere at Miller's Theater on 7 May 1921, but the theatre was forced to pull it due to demonstrations by protestors. However, the protest was organised by the Hollywood branch of the American Legion due to fears of unemployment stemming from the import of German films into America, not over objections to the content of Caligari itself. After running in large commercial theatres, Caligari began to be shown in smaller theatres and film societies in major cities. Box office figures were not regularly published in the 1920s, so it has been difficult to assess the commercial success or failure of Caligari in the United States. Film historians Kristin Thompson and David B. Pratt separately studied trade publications from the time in an attempt to make a determination, but reached conflicting findings; Thompson concluded it was a box office success and Pratt concluded it was a failure. However, both agreed it was more commercially successful in major cities than in theatres in smaller communities, where tastes were considered more conservative.

Caligari did not immediately receive a wide distribution in France due to fears over the import of German films, but film director Louis Delluc organised a single screening of it on 14 November 1921, at the Colisée cinema in Paris as part of a benefit performance for the Spanish Red Cross. Afterward, the Cosmograph company bought the film's distribution rights and premiered it at the Ciné-Opéra on 2 March 1922. Caligari played in one Paris theatre for seven consecutive years, a record that remained intact until the release of Emmanuelle (1974). According to Janowitz, Caligari was also shown in such European cities as London, Rome, Amsterdam, Stockholm, Brussels, Prague, Vienna, Budapest and Bucharest, as well as outside Europe in China, Japan, India and Turkey, and also in South American nations.

== Reception ==
=== Critical response ===
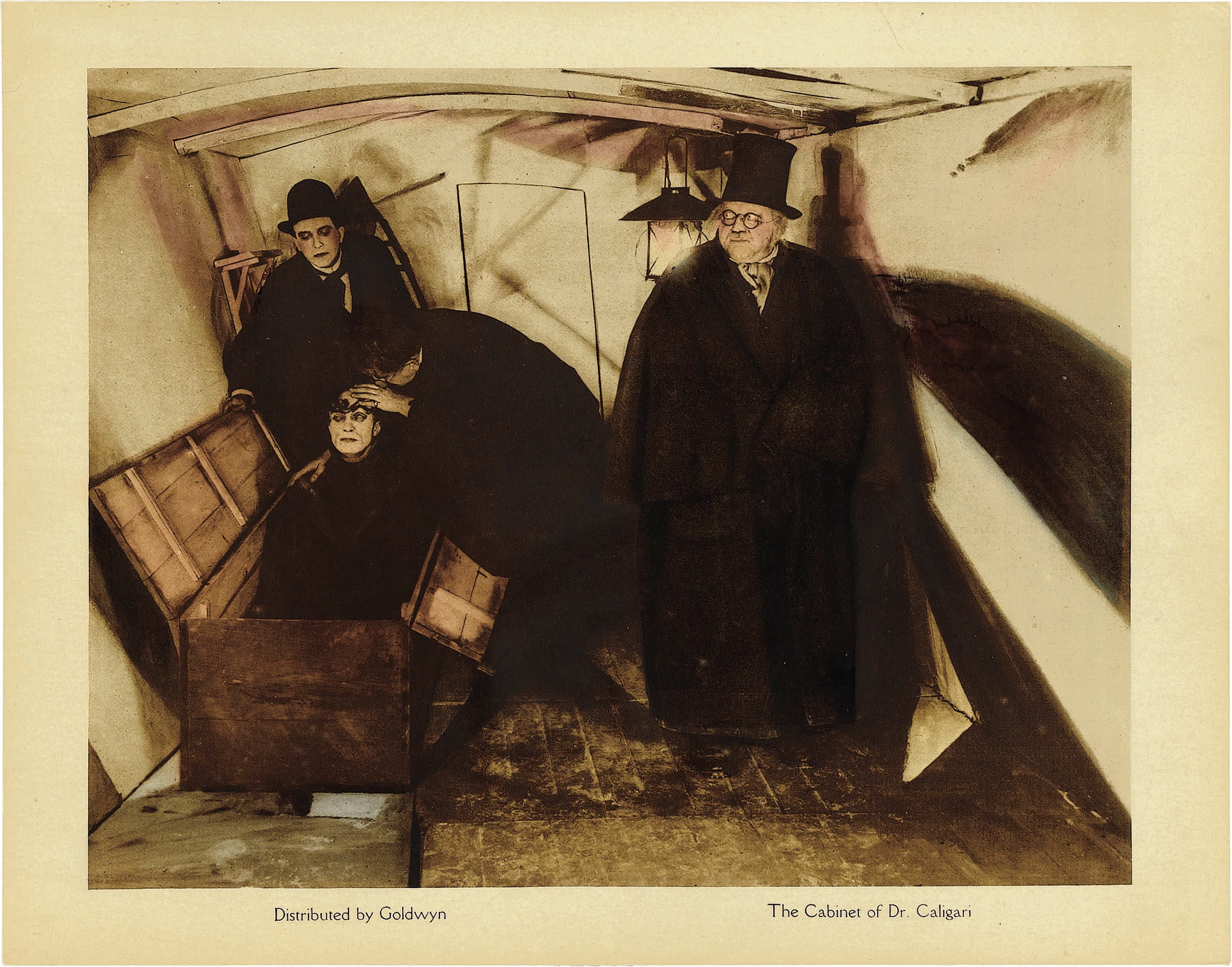
Goldwyn Releasing lobby card from Caligari showing doctors examining Cesare

There are differing accounts as to how Caligari was first received by audiences and critics immediately after its release. Stephen Brockmann, Anton Kaes and film theorist Kristin Thompson say it was popular with both the general public and well-respected by critics. Robinson wrote, "The German critics, almost without exception, ranged from favourable to ecstatic". Kracauer said critics were "unanimous in praising Caligari as the first work of art on the screen", but also said it was "too high-brow to become popular in Germany". Barlow said it was often the subject of critical disapproval, which he believes is because early film reviewers attempted to assign fixed definitions to the young art of cinema, and thus had trouble accepting the bizarre and unusual elements of Caligari. Some critics felt it imitated a stage production too closely. Other commentators, like critic Herbert Ihering and novelist Blaise Cendrars, objected to the presentation of the story as a madman's delusion because they felt it belittled Expressionism as an artform. Theatre critic Helmut Grosse condemned the film's visual design as clichéd and derivative, calling it a "cartoon and [a] reproduction of designs rather than from what actually took place on stage". Several reviewers, like Kurt Tucholsky and Blaise Cendrars, criticised the use of real actors in front of artificially-painted sets, saying it created an inconsistent level of stylisation. Critic Herbert Ihering echoed this point in a 1920 review: "If actors are acting without energy and are playing within landscapes and rooms which are formally 'excessive', the continuity of the principle is missing".

While Robinson said the response from American critics was largely positive and enthusiastic, Kaes said American critics and audiences were divided: some praised its artistic value and others, particularly those distrustful of Germany following World War I, wished to ban it altogether. Some in the Hollywood film industry felt threatened by the potential rivalry and spoke out against Caligari's release, condemning it as a "foreign invasion". Nevertheless, the film remained popular in the United States. Several American reviewers compared it to an Edgar Allan Poe story, including in a 1921 review in Variety magazine, which praised the direction and "perfect tempo" of the film, as well as the sets that "squeeze and turn and adjust the eye, and through the eye the mentality". A New York Times review likened it to modernist art, comparing the film's sets to Marcel Duchamp's Nude Descending a Staircase, No. 2, and said the film "gives dimensions and meaning to shape, making it an active part of the story, instead of merely the conventional and inert background", which was key to the film's "importance as a work of cinematography". Albert Lewin, a critic who eventually became a film director and screenwriter, called Caligari "the only serious picture, exhibited in America so far, that in anything like the same degree has the authentic thrills and shock of art". A story in a November 1921 edition of Exceptional Photoplays, an independent publication issued by the National Board of Review of Motion Pictures, said it "occupies the position of unique artistic merit", and said American films in comparison looked like they were made for "a group of defective adults at the nine-year-old level".

Caligari was a critical success in France, but French filmmakers were divided in their opinions after its release. Abel Gance called it "superb" and wrote, "What a lesson to all directors!" and René Clair said it "overthrew the realist dogma" of filmmaking. Film critic and director Louis Delluc said the film has a compelling rhythm: "At first slow, deliberately laborious, it attempts to irritate. Then when the zigzag motifs of the fairground start turning, the pace leaps forward, agitato, accelerando, and leaves off only at the word 'End', as abruptly as a slap in the face." Jean Epstein, however, called it "a prize example of the abuse of décor in the cinema" and said it "represents a grave sickness of cinema". Likewise, Jean Cocteau called it "the first step towards a grave error which consists of flat photography of eccentric decors, instead of obtaining surprise by means of the camera". French critic Frédéric-Philippe Amiguet wrote of the film: "It has the odor of tainted food. It leaves a taste of cinders in the mouth." The Russian director Sergei Eisenstein especially disliked Caligari, calling it a "combination of silent hysteria, partially coloured canvases, daubed flats, painted faces, and the unnatural broken gestures and action of monstrous chimaeras".

While early reviews were more divided, modern film critics and historians have largely praised Caligari as a revolutionary film. Film reviewer Roger Ebert called it arguably "the first true horror film", and critic Danny Peary called it cinema's first cult film and a precursor for arthouse films. In October 1958, Caligari was ranked as the twelfth-best film of all time during a poll organised at the Brussels World's Fair. With input from 117 film critics, filmmakers and historians from around the world, it was the first universal film poll in history. American film historian Lewis Jacobs said "its stylized rendition, brooding quality, lack of explanation, and distorted settings were new to the film world". Film historian and critic Paul Rotha wrote of it, "For the first time in the history of the cinema, the director has worked through the camera and broken with realism on the screen; that a film could be effective dramatically when not photographic and finally, of the greatest possible importance, that the mind of the audience was brought into play psychologically". Likewise, Arthur Knight wrote in Rogue: "More than any other film, (Caligari) convinced artists, critics and audiences that the movie was a medium for artistic expression". Entertainment Weekly included Caligari in their 1994 "Guide to the Greatest Movies Ever Made", calling it a "landmark silent film" and saying, "No other film's art direction has ever come up with so original a visualization of dementia".

The film holds an approval rating of 96% on Rotten Tomatoes based on 83 reviews, with a weighted average of 9.30/10. The site's critics' consensus states: "Arguably the first true horror film, The Cabinet of Dr. Caligari set a brilliantly high bar for the genre – and remains terrifying nearly a century after it first stalked the screen." In a list of the 100 most important German films, compiled in 1994 by the Association of German Cinémathèques, The Cabinet of Dr. Caligari was placed at #2, behind only Fritz Lang's M. Akira Kurosawa, the Japanese director, named this movie as one of his 100 favourite films.

=== Legacy ===
Caligari is the quintessential work of German Expressionist cinema, and by far the most famous example of it. It is considered a classic film, often shown in introductory film courses, film societies and museums, and is one of the most famous German films from the silent era. Film scholar Lewis Jacobs called it the "most widely discussed film of the time". Caligari helped draw worldwide attention to the artistic merit of German cinema, while also bringing legitimacy to the cinema among literary intellectuals within Germany itself. Lotte Eisner has said it was in Expressionism, as epitomised in Caligari, that "the German cinema found its true nature". The term caligarism was coined as a result, referring to a style of similar films that focus on such themes as bizarre madness and obsession, particularly through the use of visual distortion. Expressionism was late in coming to cinema, and by the time Caligari was released, many German critics felt the art form had become commercialised and trivialised; such well-known writers as Kasimir Edschmid, René Schickele, and Yvan Goll had already pronounced the Expressionist movement dead by the time Caligari arrived in theatres. Few other purely Expressionistic films were produced, and Caligari was the only one readily accessible for several decades. Among the few films to fully embrace the Expressionist style were Genuine (1920) and Raskolnikow (1923), both directed by Wiene, as well as From Morn to Midnight (1920), Torgus (1921), Das Haus zum Mond (1921), Das Haus des Dr. Gaudeamus (1921) and Waxworks.

While few other purely Expressionistic films were made, Caligari still had a major influence over other German directors, and many of the film's Expressionist elements – particularly the use of setting, light and shadow to represent the specific psychology of its characters – became prevalent in German cinema. Among the films to use these elements were Murnau's Nosferatu (1922) and The Last Laugh (1924), G. W. Pabst's Secrets of a Soul (1926), and Lang's Metropolis (1927) and M (1931). The success of Caligari also affected the way in which German films were produced during the 1920s. For example, the majority of major German films over the next few years moved away from location shooting and were fully filmed in studios, which assigned much more importance to designers in German cinema. Robinson argues this led to the rise of a large number of film designers – such as Hans Dreier, Rochus Gliese, Albin Grau, Otto Hunte, Alfred Junge, Erich Kettelhut and Paul Leni – and that effect was felt abroad as many of these talents later emigrated from Germany with the rise of the Nazi Party. Additionally, the success of Caligari's collaborative effort – including its director, set designers and actors – influenced subsequent film production in Germany for many years, making teamwork a hallmark of German cinema in the Weimar Republic.

The effect of Caligari was felt not just in German cinema, but internationally as well. Both Rotha and film historian William K. Everson wrote that the film probably had as much of a long-term effect on Hollywood directors as Battleship Potemkin (1925). In his book The Film Til Now, Rotha wrote that Caligari and Potemkin were the "two most momentous advances in the development of the cinema", and said Caligari "served to attract to the cinema audience many people who had hitherto regarded the film as the low watermark of intelligence". Caligari influenced the style and content of Hollywood films in the 1920s and early 1930s, particularly in films such as The Bells (1926), The Man Who Laughs (1928) and Murders in the Rue Morgue (1932), and had a major influence on American horror films of the 1930s, some of which featured an antagonist using Caligari-like supernatural abilities to control others, such as Dracula (1931), Svengali (1931) and The Mad Genius (1931). Kaes said both Caligari's stylistic elements, and the Cesare character in particular, influenced the Universal Studios horror films of the 1930s, which often prominently featured some sort of monster, such as Frankenstein (1931), The Mummy (1932), The Black Cat (1934), and Bride of Frankenstein (1935). The Expressionism of Caligari also influenced American avant-garde film, particularly those that used fantastic settings to illustrate an inhuman environment overpowering an individual. Early examples include The Fall of the House of Usher (1928), The Last Moment (1928) and The Life and Death of 9413: a Hollywood Extra (1928). LoBrutto wrote, "Few films throughout motion picture history have had more influence on the avant-garde, art, and student cinema than Caligari".

Caligari and German Expressionism heavily influenced the American film noir period of the 1940s and '50s, both in visual style and narrative tone. Noir films tended to portray everyone, even the innocent, as the object of suspicion, a common thread in Caligari. The genre also employs several Expressionistic elements in its dark and shadowy visual style, stylised and abstract photography, and distorted and expressive make-up and acting. Caligari also influenced films produced in the Soviet Union, such as Aelita (1924) and The Overcoat (1926). Observers have noted the black and white films of Ingmar Bergman bear a resemblance to the German films of the 1920s, and film historian Roy Armes has called him "the true heir" of Caligari. Bergman himself, however, has downplayed the influence of German Expressionism on his work. Caligari has also affected stage theatre. Siegfried Kracauer wrote that the film's use of the iris shot has been mimicked in theatrical productions, with lighting used to single out a lone actor.

Caligari continues to be one of the most discussed and debated films from the Weimar Republic. Two major books have played a large part in shaping the perception of the film and its effect on cinema as a whole: Siegfried Kracauer's From Caligari to Hitler (1947) and Lotte Eisner's The Haunted Screen (1974). From Caligari to Hitler based its claims about the film largely on an unpublished typescript by Hans Janowitz called Caligari: The Story of a Famous Story, which gave Janowitz and Carl Mayer principal credit for the making of Caligari. Mike Budd wrote of Kracauer's book: "Perhaps no film or period has been so thoroughly understood through a particular interpretation as has Caligari, and Weimar cinema generally, through Kracauer's social-psychological approach". Prior to the publication of From Caligari to Hitler, few critics had derived any symbolic political meaning from the film, but Kracauer's argument that it symbolised German obedience toward authority and a premonition of the rise of Adolf Hitler drastically changed attitudes about Caligari. Many of his interpretations of the film are still embraced, even by those who have strongly disagreed with his general premise, and even as certain claims Kracauer made have been disproven, such as his statement that the original script included no frame story. Eisner's book, meanwhile, placed Caligari into historical context by identifying how it influenced Expressionist features in other films of the 1920s.

Film historian David Robinson claimed Wiene, despite being the director of Caligari, is often given the least amount of credit for its production. He believes this is in part because Wiene died in 1938, closer to the release of the film than any other major collaborators, and was therefore unable to defend his involvement in the work while others took credit. In fact, Robinson argues Caligari ultimately hurt Wiene's reputation because his subsequent films did not match its success, so he is often wrongly considered "a one-film director" for whom Caligari was "a lucky fluke".

Japanese visual kei rock band Cali Gari derived their name from the film.

== Themes and interpretations ==
=== Authority and conformity ===
Caligari, like a number of Weimar films that followed it, thematises brutal and irrational authority by making a violent and possibly insane authority figure its antagonist. Kracauer said Caligari was symbolic of the German war government and fatal tendencies inherent in the German system, saying the character "stands for an unlimited authority that idolizes power as such, and, to satisfy its lust for domination, ruthlessly violates all human rights and values". Likewise, John D. Barlow described Caligari as an example of the tyrannical power and authority that had long plagued Germany, while Cesare represents the "common man of unconditional obedience". Janowitz has claimed Cesare represents the common citizen who is conditioned to kill or be killed, just as soldiers are trained during their military service, and that Caligari is symbolic of the German government sending those soldiers off to die in the war. The control Caligari wields over the minds and actions of others results in chaos and both moral and social perversion. Cesare lacks any individuality and is simply a tool of his master; Barlow writes that he is so dependent on Caligari that he falls dead when he strays too far from the source of his sustenance, "like a machine that has run out of fuel".

In his book From Caligari to Hitler, Kracauer argues the Caligari character is symptomatic of a subconscious need in German society for a tyrant, which he calls the German "collective soul". Kracauer argues Caligari and Cesare are premonitions of Adolf Hitler and his rule over Germany, and that his control over the weak-willed, puppet-like somnambulist prefigures aspects of the mentality that allowed the Nazi Party to rise. He calls Caligari's use of hypnotism to impose his will foreshadowing of Hitler's "manipulation of the soul". Kracauer described the film as an example of Germany's obedience to authority and failure or unwillingness to rebel against deranged authority, and reflects a "general retreat" into a shell that occurred in post-war Germany. Cesare symbolises those who have no mind of their own and must follow the paths of others; Kracauer wrote he foreshadows a German future in which "self-appointed Caligaris hypnotized innumerable Cesares into murder". Barlow rejects Kracauer's claims that the film glorifies authority "just because it has not made a preachy statement against it", and said the connection between Caligari and Hitler lies in the mood the film conveys, not an endorsement of such tyrant on the film's part.

Everyday reality in Caligari is dominated by tyrannical aspects. Authorities sit atop high perches above the people they deal with and hold offices out of sight at the end of long, forbidding stairways. Most of the film's characters are caricatures who fit neatly into prescribed social roles, such as the outraged citizens chasing a public enemy, the authoritarian police who are deferential to their superiors, the oft-harassed bureaucratic town clerk, and the asylum attendants who act like stereotypical "little men in white suits". Only Caligari and Cesare are atypical of social roles, instead serving as, in Barlow's words, "abstractions of social fears, the incarnations of demonic forces of a nightmarish world the bourgeoisie was afraid to acknowledge, where self-assertion is pushed to willful and arbitrary power over others". Kracauer wrote the film demonstrates a contrast between the rigid control, represented by such characters as Caligari and the town clerk, and chaos, represented by the crowds of people at the fair and the seemingly never-ending spinning of the merry-go-rounds. He said the film leaves no room for middle ground between these two extremes, and that viewers are forced to embrace either insanity or authoritarian rigidity, leaving little space for human freedom. Kracauer writes: "Caligari exposes the soul wavering between tyranny and chaos, and facing a desperate situation: any escape from tyranny seems to throw it into a state of utter confusion".

Caligari is not the only symbol of arrogant authority in the film. In fact, he is a victim of harsh authority himself during the scene with the dismissive town clerk, who brushes him off and ignores him to focus on his paperwork. Film historian Thomas Elsaesser argues that Caligari's murderous rampage through Cesare can be seen as a rebellious, anti-authoritarian streak in response to such experiences as these, even in spite of his own authoritarianism. The Expressionistic set design in this scene further amplifies the power of the official and the weakness of his supplicant; the clerk towers in an excessively high chair over the small and humiliated Caligari. The scene represents class and status differences, and conveys the psychological experience of being simultaneously outraged and powerless in the face of a petty bureaucracy. Another common visual motif is the use of stairways to illustrate the hierarchy of authority figures, such as the multiple stairs leading up to police headquarters, and three staircases ascending to Caligari in the asylum.

Franzis expresses resentment of all forms of authority, particularly during the end of the frame story, when he feels he has been institutionalised because of the madness of the authorities, not because there is anything wrong with him. Franzis can be seen, at least within the main narrative, as a symbol of reason and enlightenment triumphing over the irrational tyrant and unmasking the absurdity of social authority. But Kracauer contended the frame story undermines that premise. He argues if not for the frame story, the tale of Franzis's efforts against Caligari would have been a praiseworthy example of independence and rebellion against authority. However, with the addition of the frame story, which places the veracity of Franzis's claims into question, Kracauer argues the film glorifies authority and turns a reactionary story into an authoritarian film: "The result of these modifications was to falsify the action and to ultimately reduce it to the ravings of a madman." Kracauer believed these changes were not necessarily intentional, but rather an "instinctive submission to the necessities of the screen" because commercial films had to "answer to mass desires". Fritz Lang disagreed with Kracauer's argument, and instead believes the frame story makes the film's revolutionary inclinations more convincing, not less. David Robinson said, as time passed, filmgoers have been less inclined to interpret the film as a vindication of authority because modern audiences have grown more sceptical of authority in general, and are more inclined to believe Franzis's story and interpret the asylum director as wrongly committing Franzis to silence him.

=== Point of view and perception of reality ===
Another major theme of Caligari is, Stephen Brockmann writes, "the destabilized contrast between insanity and sanity and hence the destabilization of the very notion of sanity itself". By the end of the film, according to Brockman, viewers realise the story they have been watching has been told from the perspective of an insane narrator, and therefore they cannot accept anything they have seen as reliable. The film's unusual visual abstractions and other stylised elements serve to show the world as one experienced by a madman. Similarly, the film has been described as portraying the story as a nightmare and the frame story as the real world. John D. Barlow said the film exemplifies a common Expressionist theme that "the ultimate perception of reality will appear distorted and insane to the healthy and practical mind". The film serves as a reminder that any story told through a flashback subjectivises the story from the perspective of the narrator. At the film's conclusion, the asylum director shows no indication of ill will toward Franzis; in fact, he appears to genuinely care for his patients, at least from Barlow's perspective. But Franzis still believes he is being persecuted, and thus, in his version of the story, Caligari assumes the role of persecutor.

However, the Expressionistic visual elements of the film are present not only in the main narrative, but also in the epilogue and prologue scenes of the frame story, which are supposed to be an objective account of reality. For example, the frame story scenes still have trees with tentacle-like branches and a high, foreboding wall in the background. Strange leaf and line patterns are seen on the bench Franzis sits upon, flame-like geometric designs can be seen on the walls, and his asylum cell has the same distorted shape as in the main narrative. If the primary story were strictly the delusions of a madman, the frame story would be completely devoid of those elements, but the fact they are present makes it unclear whether that perspective can be taken as reliable either. Instead, the film offers no true or normal world to oppose to that of the twisted and nightmarish world as described by Franzis. As a result, after the film's closing scene, it can be seen as ambiguous whether Franzis or the asylum director is truly the insane one, or whether both are insane. Likewise, the final shot of the film, with an iris that fades to a close-up on the asylum director's face, further creates doubt over whether the character is actually sane and trustworthy. In Brockman's words, "In the end, the film is not just about one unfortunate madman; it is about an entire world that is possibly out of balance". Mike Budd notes that, during the scene in which asylum doctors restrain Franzis, his movements closely mimic those of Caligari from a similar scene during the main story. Budd says this suggests a "dream logic of repetition" that throws further confusion on which perspective is reality.

Beyond Franzis's individual circumstances, the use of the narrator's perspective in Dr. Caligari can be seen as reflective of a worldview of the screenwriters. Mayer and Janowitz were pacifists opposed to what Eisner described as the willingness of Germans to commit themselves to the dark forces, such as demoniac magic and supernatural powers, that led to death on the battlefield. Although he does not think it possible to reduce the narrative or the film to the beliefs of its makers, Eisner claims Franzis can be seen as embodying the politics of Expressionism's anti-naturalism, through which a protagonist does not see the world objectively, but has "visions" that are abstracted from individuality and psychology. The framing device of an insane asylum, for Eisner, has a broader connotation as a statement on social reality in the context of the "state of exception". Here, Eisner claims, the militarist and imperialist tendency of monopoly capitalism is combined with what Sigmund Freud would later refer to as the longing for protection by a tyrannical father figure, or what Kracauer characterised as "asocial authority".

=== Double life ===
Duality is another common theme in Caligari. Caligari is portrayed in the main narrative as an insane tyrant, and in the frame story as a respected authority and director of a mental institution. As a result of this duality, it is possible for the viewer to suspect a malevolent aspect of him at the conclusion of the film, even despite evidence indicating he is a kind and caring man. Even within the main narrative alone, Caligari lives a double life: holding a respectable position as the asylum director, but becoming a hypnotist and murderer at night. Additionally, the character is actually a double of the "real" Caligari, an 18th-century mystic whom the film character becomes so obsessed with that he desires to penetrate his innermost secrets and "become Caligari". Franzis also takes on a double life of sorts, serving as the heroic protagonist in the main narrative and a patient in a mental institution in the frame story. Anton Kaes described the story Franzis tells as an act of transference with his psychiatrist, as well as a projection of his feelings that he is a victim under the spell of the all-powerful asylum director, just as Cesare is the hypnotised victim of Caligari. The Cesare character serves as both a persecutor and a victim, as he is both a murderer and the unwilling slave of an oppressive master.

Siegfried Kracauer said by coupling a fantasy in which Franzis overthrows a tyrannical authority with a reality in which authority triumphs over Franzis, Caligari reflects a double aspect of German life, suggesting they reconsider their traditional belief in authority even as they embrace it. A contrast between levels of reality exists not only in the characterisations, but in the presentation of some of the scenes as well. This, Barlow writes, "reveals a contrast between external calm and internal chaos". For example, flashback scenes when Franzis reads Caligari's diary, in which the doctor is shown growing obsessed with learning hypnotic powers, take place as Caligari is sleeping peacefully in the present. Another example is the fair, which on the surface appears to represent fun and escapism, but reveals a lurking sense of chaos and disaster in the form of Caligari and Cesare. The visual elements of the film also convey a sense of duality, particularly in the contrasts between black and white. This is especially prevalent in the sets, where black shadows are set against white walls, but also in other elements like the costumes and make-up. For instance, Caligari wears mostly black, but white streaks are present in his hair and on his gloves. Cesare's face is a ghostly white, but the darks of his eyes are heavily outlined in black. Likewise, Jane's white face contrasts with her deep, dark eyes.

=== Reflection on post-World War I Germany ===
Critics have suggested that Caligari highlights some of the neuroses prevalent in Germany and the Weimar Republic when the film was made, particularly in the shadow of World War I, at a time when extremism was rampant, reactionaries still controlled German institutions, and citizens feared the harm the Treaty of Versailles would have on the economy. Siegfried Kracauer wrote that the paranoia and fear portrayed in the film were signs of things to come in Germany, and that the film reflected a tendency in Germans to "retreat into themselves" and away from political engagement following the war. Vincent LoBrutto wrote that the film can be seen as a social or political analogy of "the moral and physical breakdown of Germany at the time, with a madman on the loose wreaking havoc on a distorted and off-balanced society, a metaphor for a country in chaos".

Anton Kaes, who called Caligari "an aggressive statement about war psychiatry, murder and deception", wrote that Alan's question to Cesare, "How long have I to live?" reflected the trauma German citizens experienced during the war, as that question was often on the minds of soldiers and of family members back home concerned about their loved ones in the military. Franzis's despair after Alan's murder can likewise be compared to that of the many soldiers who survived the war but saw their friends die on the battlefield. Kaes noted other parallels between the film and war experiences, noting that Cesare attacked Alan at dawn, a common time for attacks during the war. Thomas Elsaesser called Caligari an "outstanding example of how 'fantastic' representations in German films from the early 1920s seem to bear the imprint of pressures from external events, to which they refer only through the violence with which they disguise and disfigure them".

== Sequels, remakes and musical works ==
=== Film ===
Several unsuccessful attempts were made to produce sequels and remakes in the decades following Caligari's release. Wiene purchased the rights to Caligari from Universum Film AG in 1934 with the intention of filming a sound remake, which never materialised before Wiene's death in 1938. He intended to cast Jean Cocteau as Cesare, and a script, believed to be written by Wiene, indicated the Expressionist style would have been replaced with a French surrealist style. In 1944, Erich Pommer and Hans Janowitz each separately attempted to obtain the legal rights to the film, with hopes of a Hollywood remake. Pommer attempted to argue he had a better claim to the rights because the primary value of the original film came not from the writing, but "in the revolutionary way the picture was produced". However, both Janowitz and Pommer ran into complications related to the invalidity of Nazi law in the United States, and uncertainty over the legal rights of sound and silent films. Janowitz wrote a treatment for a remake, and in January 1945 was offered a minimum guarantee of $16,000 against a five-percent royalty for his rights to the original film for a sequel directed by Fritz Lang, but the project never came to fruition. Later, Janowitz planned a sequel called Caligari II, and unsuccessfully attempted to sell the property to a Hollywood producer for $30,000.

Around 1947, Hollywood agent Paul Kohner and Hungarian filmmaker Ernst Matray planned a Caligari sequel; Matray and his wife Maria Solveg wrote a screenplay called The Return of Caligari, which would have reimagined Caligari as a former Nazi officer and war criminal, but the film was ultimately unproduced. In 1960, independent producer Robert Lippert acquired the rights from Matray and Universum Film AG for $50,000, and produced a film called The Cabinet of Caligari, released in 1962. Screenwriter Robert Bloch did not intend to write a Caligari remake, and in fact the title was forced upon his untitled screenplay by director Roger Kay. The film had few similarities to the original Caligari, save for its title and a plot twist at the end, in which it is revealed the story was simply the delusion of the protagonist, who believed she was being held captive by a character named Caligari. Instead, he was her psychiatrist, and he cures her at the end of the film.

The 1983 film Caligari's Cure, by avant-garde filmmaker Tom Palazzolo, was an experimental updating of The Cabinet of Dr. Caligari that features extensive archive footage. While Caligari's Cure remains obscure, it was generally well-received.

A quasi-sequel, titled Dr. Caligari, was released in 1989, directed by Stephen Sayadian and starring Madeleine Reynal as the granddaughter of the original Caligari, now running an asylum and performing bizarre hormonal experiments on its patients. The sex-driven story has little in common with the original film. In 1992, theatre director Peter Sellars released his only feature film, The Cabinet of Dr. Ramirez, an experimental film loosely based on Caligari. However, the storyline was created as the film was being made, so it has few similarities with the original. The film was screened only at the 1992 Sundance Film Festival and never theatrically released. An independent remake, edited, written and directed by David Lee Fisher, was released in 2005, in which new actors were placed in front of the original backdrops. The actors performed in front of a green screen, then their performances were superimposed in front of matte shots based on the original sets. Doug Jones played the role of Cesare.

=== Music and stage ===
Numerous musicians have composed scores to accompany the film.

- The Club Foot Orchestra premiered a score penned by ensemble founder and artistic director Richard Marriott in 1987.
- Israeli Electronica group TaaPet composed a soundtrack and performed it several times through Israel in 2000.
- The British composer and musician Geoff Smith composed a new soundtrack in 2003.
- In 2013, the Dallas Chamber Symphony commissioned composer Brian Satterwhite to write an original musical score, which premiered during a concert screening at Moody Performance Hall on February 26, 2013 with Richard McKay conducting.
- Dutch psychedelic band Monomyth composed a new score and performed it during a screening at the Imagine Film Festival in the Netherlands in April 2016. Bertelsmann/BMG commissioned Timothy Brock to adapt his 1996 score for string orchestra for a 2014 restoration; Brock conducted the premiere in Brussels on 15 September 2014.
- In 2012, the Chatterbox Audio Theatre recorded a live soundtrack, including dialogue, sound effects, and music for Caligari, released on YouTube on 30 October 2013.
- Two new scores were recorded for a 2016 DVD release: a traditional score by Timothy Brock performed by the Brussels Philharmonic, and an electroacoustic score by Edison Studio, a collective of composers.
- In 1981, Bill Nelson was sought by the Yorkshire Actors Company to create a soundtrack for a stage adaptation. The score was later recorded for his 1982 album Das Kabinet (The Cabinet of Doctor Caligari).
- Caligari was adapted into an opera in 1997 by composer John Moran, that premiered at the American Repertory Theater in Cambridge, Massachusetts, in a production by Robert McGrath.
- A two-act musical adaptation premiered at the 2001 Midtown International Theatre Festival. Music and lyrics were by Douglas Hicton, with the book by Richard Lawton and Hicton. The production was directed by David Leidholdt.
- Joseph Kahn and Rob Zombie directed a music video for the 1999 single "Living Dead Girl" with imagery directly inspired by The Cabinet of Dr. Caligari, with Zombie's wife Sheri Moon Zombie playing the Cesare part as the titular character.
- In 2015, Indian scenographer and director Deepan Sivaraman adapted the film into an hour-long mixed-media piece with the performance studies students at Ambedkar University Delhi as part of a course entitled "Space and Spectatorship".
- Scottish Opera's Connect Company commissioned composer Karen MacIver and librettist Allan Dunn to produce an opera based on The Cabinet of Dr. Caligari, which was first performed in 2016. Though it shared the same story as the film, the setting was changed to Glasgow Green and Gartloch in Glasgow, Scotland.
- In 2020, Spanish post-rock band Toundra released their own soundtrack. It was released exactly 100 years after the original film premiere. The album consists of seven songs, which match the film structure - opening title sequence, plus six film acts. The songs are also the same length as the acts, so the music can be synchronised to the film.
- In 2024, German musician and ex-Kraftwerk member Karl Bartos released a new soundtrack. It premiered on February 17 at the Alte Oper in Frankfurt am Main.
- In 1998, an audio adaptation written and directed by Yuri Rasovsky was released by Tangled Web Audio on audio cassette. The cast included John de Lancie, Kaitlin Hopkins, and Robertson Dean. The dramatisation won the Independent Publisher Book Award for Best Direct-to-Audio Production in 1998. In 2008, BBC Radio 3 broadcast an audio adaptation by Amanda Dalton entitled Caligari, starring Luke Treadaway, Tom Ferguson, Sarah McDonald Hughes, Terence Mann, and countertenor Robin Blaze as Cesare. Caligari was an entirely silent character in this adaptation.
- In 2024, film and television composer Jeff Beal composed a new score, which premiered live-to-picture at Carnegie Hall, and is presented on the Kino-Lorber 4K UHD release.

== See also ==
- List of cult films
