= Café Flesh =

- DVD cover
- Directed by: Rinse Dream; Mark S. Esposito (uncredited)
- Written by: Rinse Dream; Herbert W. Day
- Produced by: F.X. Pope; Stephen Sayadian
- Cinematography: F.X. Pope
- Edited by: Sidney M. Katz
- Music by: Mitchell Froom
- Distributed by: VCA Pictures
- Release date: 1982
- Running time: 74 minutes
- Country: United States
- Language: English

Café Flesh is a 1982 post-apocalyptic cult pornographic science fiction film designed and directed by Stephen Sayadian (under the pseudonym "Rinse Dream") and co-written by Sayadian and Jerry Stahl (credited as "Herbert W. Day"). Music was composed and produced by noted music producer Mitchell Froom (and later appeared in his album, Key of Cool).

Two sequels, Café Flesh 2 and Café Flesh 3, were released in 1997 and 2003, without the participation of the original creators. The sequels were written and directed by Antonio Passolini and did not have the same degree of popularity and cult appeal as the first film.

== Plot ==
In the aftermath of nuclear apocalypse, 99% of the survivors are sex Negatives – they become violently ill if they attempt to have sex. The minority sex Positives are forced to engage in carnal theater for the entertainment of the Negatives at Café Flesh. Everyone is excited about the arrival at the club of the famous Positive Johnny Rico, and one Negative woman is beginning to question her negativeness as she and her husband grow more distant from each other.

== History ==
By the early 1970s, the pornographic film industry had gained popularity, through the success of films such as Behind the Green Door and Deep Throat. During this period, there were many attempts to create artistic pornography, including The Devil in Miss Jones. There were also non-pornographic films with hardcore sex, such as I Am Curious (Yellow) and In the Realm of the Senses. By the early 1980s, home video technology shifted the porn industry, and pornography theaters were becoming less successful.

In 1982, Café Flesh, which mixed sex, satire, and avant-garde theater, was released. The film was created and co-written by Stephen Sayadian, under the name "Rinse Dream", and journalist Jerry Stahl, under the name "Herbert W. Day". Sayadian and Stahl made the film in two separate parts, using the non-pornographic elements of the film to attract financiers.

Two actors involved in this film went on to notable work in mainstream productions. Lead actress Michelle Bauer, using the name Pia Snow in this film, became a prolific B-movie actress. Richard Belzer, a noted comedian at the time who later became known for his role as John Munch in Homicide: Life on the Street and Law & Order: Special Victims Unit, appears as an audience member, but does not appear in any of the sexual scenes.

In a 2024 interview, Sayadian said that Cafe Flesh was shot in 10 days on a $90,000 budget. He noted some rejected ideas for the ending included having the Nick character chop off his own penis during the performance or hanging himself. (In fact, the movie ends abruptly but less dramatically with Nick being led out of the cafe in a daze.)

== Reception ==
Scholar Bradford K. Mudge has said of Café Flesh, that it, "Like all great satire...stands in parodic opposition to the very generic forms out of which it evolved. Its brilliance results from a bifurcated vision: it dramatizes at once the death of pornography and its disturbing resurrection as culture itself. In so doing, the film marks a juncture—historically arbitrary to be sure—when 'pornography' is finally capable of critical self-reflection, capable of seeing its own 'imagination' as distinct from but integral to both its aesthetic predecessors and its larger cultural environment."

Jacob Smith noted that "Sayadian's stylistic choices regarding performance--in large part pragmatic responses to the logistical imperatives of porn production--ended up shaping an aesthetic that ran parallel to a punk subculture that took an unsentimental, jaded view of sex and rejected the 1960s countercultural assertion of the liberating potential of free love. Cafe Flesh offers a metaphoric depiction of changing sexual mores in the Reagan era, when AIDS, punk, and a conservative cultural backlash would drive a stake through the heart of the free love ideals of the counterculture."

Erotica author Hapax Legomenon notes that Cafe Flesh includes themes which were typically taboo in 1980s porn movies (violence, family structures and rules, impotence, illness and morality). He wrote that the movie leaves ambiguous whether the lead female character (Lana) was always secretly a Sex Positive or had somehow become transformed into a Sex Positive by watching the final sex scene with Johnny Rico.

== Restoration and re-release ==
When interviewed for a 2022 podcast, film preservationist Daniel Bird (who worked on the 2021 restoration of Sayadian's Dr. Caligari) said that he would work with Sayadian to restore Cafe Flesh as well. The Blu Ray/4K restoration was released in April 2025 by Mondo Macabro to general praise. In a social media post, Mondo Macabro announced a general Blu Ray release in July 2025.

One reviewer notes, "As well as serving as a commentary on porn and voyeurism, Café Flesh distils the obsessions of its era, from 1950s nostalgia (seen in other 1980s films such as Blue Velvet, Parents and Back to the Future) to nuclear terror and Aids."

Another reviewer of the 2025 restored movie wrote, "While Cabaret may have provided the overall structure for Café Flesh, the individual tableaux were inspired by Arthur Freed and Busby Berkeley musicals instead. The opening sequence is directly lifted from the “Triplets” number in The Band Wagon, with three grown men dressed up as babies in highchairs sitting in the background."

Another reviewer wrote, "Perhaps a more fully realized version of the movie might have leaned heavily on the surreal horror side, but the version that endures with this majestic restoration is hypnotic and alluring, but also restrained. The story is so short and simple that it feels like a fairy tale with humor, cynicism and longing."

== In popular culture ==
The intro of the 1995 White Zombie single More Human Than Human contains samples from Café Flesh.

== Awards ==
Café Flesh won the 1984 AVN Award for Best Art Direction - Film and has been inducted into the XRCO Hall of Fame. Café Flesh 2 won the 1998 XRCO Award for Best Video and the 1999 AVN Award for Best Video Feature and Best Special Effects.

== See also ==
- List of cult films
