= Darlanne Fluegel =

American actress (1953–2017)

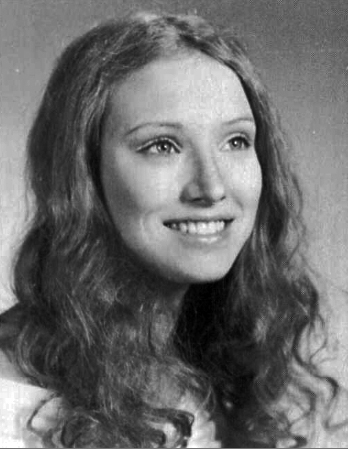
- Fluegel in 1971
- Born: November 25, 1953; Wilkes-Barre, Pennsylvania, U.S.
- Died: December 15, 2017 (aged 64); Orlando, Florida, U.S.
- Occupations: Actress; model; professor; producer
- Years active: 1971–2010
- Spouse: Michael Ira Small (m. 1983; div. 2004)
- Children: 2

Darlanne Fluegel (November 25, 1953 – December 15, 2017) was an American actress, fashion model, film producer, and professor. Fluegel played the female lead role in a number of films and television shows throughout the 1980s and 1990s.

== Early life and education ==
Fluegel was born November 25, 1953, in Wilkes-Barre, Pennsylvania, the second child of Donald Raymond and Jane (née Warnecke) Fluegel's five children. She had one older sister and three younger brothers, as well as an older maternal half-sister. Fluegel graduated from Binghamton Central High School in Binghamton, New York, in 1971, the year after her father died.

== Career ==
=== Modeling ===
Fluegel started modeling at 16 and moved to New York City at 18 to start her professional modeling career, saying it was "a quick way out of Binghamton" so she would "not ...be a burden" on her mother.

In 1971, Fluegel was hired as a model by Eileen Ford, initially earning $100 per hour and ended her modeling career in 1981 earning $300 per hour (equivalent to $1,062 in 2025). She was represented for 15 years by Ford Models and then with the Zoli Agency in New York while studying acting at Stella Adler. Fluegel said "I never wanted bimbo parts. When I was in New York, I figured I'd rather model than come to California and take those kind of parts".

Reflecting on her modeling career in 1986, Fluegel said "It hasn't been easy. It is tough to get people in the acting world to take you seriously if you've been a successful model. Some models turn out to be good actresses; most are terrible". Her modeling mentor, Eileen Ford, said Fluegel's difference was "... she approached her acting scientifically. She worked at it and didn't let the hype go to her head. A lot of models wouldn't have done that."

=== Acting ===
Fluegel said "I realized I was washed up as a model at 25. I'd been in the business for years, and a lot of people thought I was even older than I was. I realized I had to make a drastic change in my life." Fluegel made her screen debut in a supporting role as a model in the 1978 Irvin Kershner film Eyes of Laura Mars. Discussing her debut, she said "I wasn't ready after Laura Mars. Let's just say that it wasn't much of a stretch to portray a New York model being chased by a weirdo. But when I was 25 I decided to go for it. What the hell, right? I was always determined to succeed at whatever I did and I figured Hollywood was a tough nut to crack—but one that could be broken."

Her first major film role was as Nanelia in the cult sci-fi movie Battle Beyond the Stars (1980).

Fluegel was featured as Robert De Niro's girlfriend Eve in Sergio Leone's 1984 film Once Upon a Time in America. Fluegel's role in the film opened the door for Fluegel to a wide array of different character types.

She was featured in Tough Guys (1986) as Kirk Douglas' girlfriend.

In 1985, she appeared in To Live and Die in L.A. as Ruth Lanier, an undercover informant, heroin addict, and a woman whose relationship with Secret Service Agent Richard Chance, portrayed by William Petersen, is primarily physical and transactional.

In 1986, she portrayed Billy Crystal's ex-wife Anna in the buddy-cop action comedy Running Scared. The film's director, Peter Hyams, later said he had "had a huge crush on Fluegel since he saw her in To Live and Die in L.A.".

Fluegel had a primary role during the first season of Michael Mann's NBC film noir drama series Crime Story playing Julie Torello, Detective Michael Torello's (portrayed by actor Dennis Farina) wife in 11 episodes from 1986 to 1987. A New York Times review said of Fluegel's performance: "A smoldering Darlanne Fluegel played Torello's wife, Julie. Their marriage crumbled over the show's first season, as Torello let the violence of his job bleed into his family life..." Fluegel described her character as "a woman trying to come to terms with the 60s. She wants the American dream—a nice home, a husband, a family—but those things are falling apart."

Fluegel joined Fred Dryer's character Sgt. Rick Hunter in the cast of NBC's detective series Hunter, playing the role of Hunter's sidekick, Metro Division officer Joanne Molenski. Fluegel said she was pleased to have earned the part, saying "...this time I've got a part that's not a stereotyped female role as a wife or girlfriend. This is bigger, so I can show a broad spectrum of Joanne's emotional and physical life. And I was delighted to get to play a cop. (Acting) as a wife, you only deal with how the job affects someone on the periphery. But here you learn that they risk their lives every day and the job never leaves them. That's why this part took so much preparation."

After seven episodes Fluegel announced she would leave the series early, saying "Having completed my obligation to the series, I feel it's time to move on to other roles in both television and features." Fluegel's publicist, Lili Unger, said at that time "I wouldn't say there was any tension or conflict on the set. I think she had hoped that her character would evolve beyond a certain point, but it hasn't." Fluegel's character was written out of the show as a shooting victim. Her last episode aired in January 1991.

As a lead actress, Fluegel starred in the independent film Freeway (1988). In 1989, she starred in Lock Up with Sylvester Stallone. She later had a recurring role on Wiseguy.

=== Teaching ===
Fluegel taught acting and drama as a professor at University of Central Florida's School of Film and Digital Media program from 2002 to 2007.

At the New Beverly Cinema in Los Angeles in 2011, Fluegel encouraged the audience to be receptive to their life experiences. She said "it could be the greatest thing you could do. Just being in your life, talking to people, just doing what you're doing, let it bring into you. Bring it back in."

=== Film producer ===
Fluegel co-produced the 2010 documentary film The Land of the Rising Fastball, an examination of Japan's interest in baseball and the sociological role it has held throughout that nation's growth, from its introduction in 1872, through World War II, to today.

== Personal life ==
Fluegel said she was pressured into changing her surname when she started her acting career. "There was a lot of pressure from agents, publicists and even Gene Shalit on The Today Show asked why I (kept) it, but I want my family to be proud of me. And I find that once people hear the name, they don't soon forget it." Kirk Douglas, who worked with Fluegel in the film Tough Guys said "With a name like Fluegel, she'd better be good." The surname "Fluegel" means "wing" in conversational German.

From 1983 until 2004, Fluegel was married to Michael Ira Small, a rodeo rider and American bullfighter who also acted under the name Michael J. Moore and was an inductee of the Texas Rodeo Cowboy Hall of Fame. They had two children, a daughter and a son.

=== Death ===
Fluegel was diagnosed at age 56 with early-onset Alzheimer's disease. On December 15, 2017, she died from the disease at her home in Orlando, Florida. Fluegel's body was cremated and her ashes were given to family members.

== Accolades ==
- 2010 – LAPD 100 Years: Celebrating the Women Sworn to Protect and to Serve: The Los Angeles Police Department honored Fluegel and her Hunter predecessor Stepfanie Kramer for their portrayals of LAPD Officer Joanne Molenski and LAPD Sgt. Dee Dee McCall, respectively, in an event celebrating female Los Angeles police officers.

== Filmography ==
=== Films ===
Year	Title	Role
1978	Eyes of Laura Mars	Lulu
1980	Battle Beyond the Stars	Nanelia
1983	The Last Fight	Sally
1984	Once Upon a Time in America	Eve
1985	To Live And Die In L.A.	Ruth Lanier
1986	Running Scared	Anna Costanzo
1986	Tough Guys	Skye
1988	Bulletproof	Capt. Devon Shepard
1988	Deadly Stranger	Peggy Martin
1988	Freeway	Sarah 'Sunny' Harper
1989	Lock Up	Melissa
1990	Fatal Sky	Phyllis 'Bird' McNamara
1992	Pet Sematary Two	Renee Hallow
1993	Slaughter of the Innocents	Susan Broderick
1994	Scanner Cop	Dr. Joan Alden
1994	Breaking Point	Dana Preston / Molly Carpenter
1994	Relative Fear	Linda Pratman
1996	Darkman III: Die Darkman Die	Dr. Bridget Thorne

=== Television ===
Year	Title	Role	Notes
1984	Concrete Beat	Stephanie	TV movie
1985	MacGyver	Barbara Spencer	Episode 1.1: Pilot
1986	The Twilight Zone	Mom	Episode: "Gramma/Personal Demons/Cold Reading"
1986	Alfred Hitchcock Presents	Zoe	Episode: "Enough Rope for Two"
1986–1987	Crime Story	Julie Torello	Main role (season 1), 11 episodes
1990	Wiseguy	Lacey	Recurring role, 5 episodes
1990–1991	Hunter	Off. Joanne Molenski	Main role (season 7), 12 episodes
1994	Come Die with Me	Pat Chambers	TV movie
