= Dr. Caligari (film) =

1989 film by Stephen Sayadian

- Theatrical release poster
- Directed by: Stephen Sayadian
- Written by: Stephen Sayadian; Jerry Stahl
- Produced by: Joseph F. Robertson
- Starring: Madeleine Reynal
- Cinematography: Ladi von Jansky
- Edited by: G. Martin Steiner
- Music by: Mitchell Froom
- Distributed by: Manley Films
- Release date: 1989
- Running time: 80 minutes
- Country: United States
- Language: English
- Budget: <$500,000

Dr. Caligari is a 1989 American avant-garde horror erotic film co-written and directed by Stephen Sayadian and starring Madeleine Reynal, Laura Albert, Gene Zerna, David Parry, Fox Harris and Jennifer Balgobin. It is a quasi-sequel to the 1920 film The Cabinet of Dr. Caligari. The film details a disturbed doctor (the granddaughter of the original Dr. Caligari) and her illegal experiments on her patients.

Originally and briefly billed as Dr. Caligari 3000 when it debuted at select theaters in 1989, the film promptly faded into obscurity. Since it was released on VHS and limited Betamax format, the title has been Dr. Caligari. The film is considered a cult classic and has been shown as a "midnight movie" at various times.

In the film, Dr. Caligari conducts mindswapping experiments on unwilling mental patients, in an attempt to cure them. She succeeds only in transferring certain mental conditions and character traits from one person to others. The main themes explored in these experiments are human cannibalism, nymphomania, and transvestism.

== Plot ==
The main plot involves Dr. Caligari's experiments with her patients at the C.I.A. (Caligari Insane Asylum), where she transfers glandular brain fluids from one patient to another. Two of her main patients, Mr. Pratt, a cannibalistic serial killer, and Mrs. Van Houten, a nymphomanical housewife, are the primary subjects of her mindswapping. Mrs. Van Houten becomes the cannibal and Mr. Pratt the nymphomaniac, although they seem to still retain some elements of themselves as well. Apparently, Caligari's unconventional idea is to cure people by introducing equally opposite traits to balance out disturbed minds, but this is never explicitly stated in the film.

Several other doctors, a married couple (Mr. and Mrs. Lodger) become concerned with Caligari's experiments and approach Mrs. Lodger's father, Dr. Avol, who confronts Caligari only to fall victim to her mindswapping and receive an injection of Mrs. Van Houten's brain fluid, turning him into a transvestite nymphomaniac.

Sex is a prominent theme throughout the movie, especially for Mrs. Van Houten, who appears topless and performs masturbation at several points, but there are no hardcore scenes, as this was released as an R-rated feature. By the end of the film, Mrs. Van Houten has injected Dr. Caligari with her own nymphomaniacal brain fluid and herself with Caligari's ancestor's (the original Dr. Caligari from The Cabinet of Dr. Caligari); thus the patient becomes the doctor, the doctor becomes the patient and the inmates are left to run the asylum.

== Cast ==
- Madeleine Reynal as Dr. Caligari
- Fox Harris as Dr. Avol
- Laura Albert as Mrs. Van Houten
- Jennifer Balgobin as Ramona Lodger
- John Durbin as Gus Pratt
- Gene Zerna as Les Van Houten
- David Parry as Dr. Lodger
- Barry Phillips as Cesare
- Magie Song as Patient in Straitjacket
- Jennifer Miro as Miss Koonce
- Stephen Quadros as Scarecrow
- Carol Albright as Screaming Patient
- Catherine Case as Patient with Extra Hormones
- Debra De Liso as Grace Butler (as Debra Deliso)
- Lori Chacko as Patient in Bed
- Marjean Holden as Patient in Bed

== Production ==
Producer Gerald Steiner approached Stephen Sayadian about doing a modern update of The Cabinet of Dr. Caligari as the film was in the public domain and Steiner thought the unusual camera angles Sayadian utilized in his film Nursery Crimes would make Sayadian an ideal choice for director. Sayadian liked the idea shooting only interiors and working with the expressionist style but also making the film his own, in particular giving the film overt S&M overtones and changing Dr. Caligari from a little old man to an intense female Dominatrix. Sayadin said when making the film he was trying to play towards the midnight movie audience rather than a more conventional horror film.

=== Filming ===
Sayadian shot the film during the 1988 Writers Guild of America strike using only interiors and due to the strike the production was able to use many production resources around the Los Angeles area that otherwise wouldn't have been available due to the work stoppage caused by the strike.

== Release ==
Dr. Caligari was shown at the Toronto Festival of Festivals on August 30, 1989.

== Critical reaction ==
From a contemporary review, "Devo." of Variety found the film to have a "weak attempt" at "campy dialog and bizarre plot twists" and that "even discriminating cult movie mavens may sit this one out."

A retrospective review from the Los Angeles Times wrote "One of the kinkiest artifacts ever to come out of Orange County has to be the movie "Dr. Caligari.""

== Home video ==
The film was released in the United States on Laserdisc by Image Entertainment. At the same time, Shapiro Glickenhaus Entertainment released it on VHS. Excalibur Films, despite mostly dealing with pornographic film, released it on DVD on August 23, 2002. as the company was formed by the film's executive producer. In 2023, Mondo Macabro released the film as a limited edition 4K Ultra HD.
