= List of German films of 1927 =

This is a list of the most notable films produced in the Cinema of Germany in 1927.

Title	Director	Cast	Genre	Notes
1927
Aftermath	Erich Waschneck	Jenny Hasselquist, Hubert von Meyerinck, Fritz Alberti	Drama	
Agitated Women	Richard Oswald	Asta Nielsen, Carmen Boni, Gustav Fröhlich	Drama	
Alpine Tragedy	Robert Land	Lucy Doraine, Arnold Korff, Fritz Kortner	Drama	
Always Be True and Faithful	Reinhold Schünzel	Rosa Valetti, Sig Arno, Lydia Potechina	Comedy	
Assassination	Richard Oswald	Eduard Rothauser, Mathilde Sussin	Thriller	
At the Edge of the World	Karl Grune	William Dieterle, Brigitte Helm	Drama	
Attorney for the Heart	Wilhelm Thiele	Lil Dagover, Jean Murat	Romance	
The Awakening of Woman	Fred Sauer	Grete Mosheim, Hermann Vallentin	Comedy	
Babette Bomberling	Victor Janson	Xenia Desni, Karl Elzer	Comedy	
The Beggar Student	Jacob Fleck, Luise Fleck	Harry Liedtke, Ágnes Esterházy	Silent	
Behind the Altar	Julius Brandt, William Dieterle	Marcella Albani, Alfred Gerasch	Drama	
Benno Stehkragen	Trude Santen	Margit Barnay, Käthe Haack	Silent	
Bigamy	Jaap Speyer	Heinrich George, Maria Jacobini	Drama	
Bismarck 1862–1898	Kurt Blachy	Franz Ludwig, Erna Morena	Historical	
The Bordello in Rio	Hans Steinhoff	Vivian Gibson, Albert Steinrück, Hans Stüwe	Drama	
The Bordellos of Algiers	Wolfgang Hoffmann-Harnisch	Maria Jacobini, Camilla Horn, Warwick Ward	Drama	
Break-in	Franz Osten	Erika Glässner, Camilla von Hollay	Crime	
Carnival Magic	Rudolf Walther-Fein, Rudolf Dworsky	Harry Liedtke, Grete Mosheim	Comedy	
Caught in Berlin's Underworld	Martin Berger	Fritz Kortner, Maly Delschaft	Drama	
The Cavalier from Wedding	Wolfgang Neff	Kurt Vespermann, Maly Delschaft	Silent	
Chance the Idol	Graham Cutts	Jack Trevor, Ágnes Esterházy	Drama	
Children's Souls Accuse You	Curtis Bernhardt	Albert Steinrück, Nathalie Lissenko	Drama	
Circle of Lovers	Rudolf Walther-Fein, Rudolf Dworsky	Hans Mierendorff, Marcella Albani	Silent	
Circus Beely	Harry Piel	Harry Piel, Charly Berger	Thriller	
Circus Renz	Wolfgang Neff	Angelo Ferrari, Mary Kid, Ernst Winar	Adventure	
The City of a Thousand Delights	Carmine Gallone	Paul Richter, Adele Sandrock	Drama	
The Convicted	Rudolf Meinert	Eugen Klöpfer, Margarete Schlegel	Drama	
A Crazy Night	Richard Oswald	Ossi Oswalda, Harry Liedtke	Comedy	
Crooks in Tails	Manfred Noa	Nils Asther, Suzy Vernon	Silent	
The Csardas Princess	Hanns Schwarz	Liane Haid, Imre Ráday	Romance	Co-production with Hungary
The Curse of Vererbung	Adolf Trotz	Marcella Albani, Maly Delschaft	Drama	
Dancing Vienna	Frederic Zelnik	Lya Mara, Ben Lyon	Silent	
The Dashing Archduke	Robert Land	Liane Haid, Ellen Kürti	Silent	Co-production with Austria
A Day of Roses in August	Max Mack	Eduard von Winterstein, Margarete Schön	Drama	
Did You Fall in Love Along the Beautiful Rhine?	James Bauer	Philipp Manning, Dorothea Wieck	Romance	
The Dollar Princess and Her Six Admirers	Felix Basch	Liane Haid, Georg Alexander	Silent	
Doña Juana	Paul Czinner	Elisabeth Bergner, Walter Rilla	Drama	
Durchlaucht Radieschen	Richard Eichberg	Xenia Desni, Werner Fuetterer	Silent	
Das edle Blut	Carl Boese	Hanna Ralph, Eugen Burg	Silent	
Ehekonflikte	Bruno Rahn	Werner Pittschau, Victor Colani	Comedy	
Eheskandal im Hause Fromont jun. und Risler sen.	A. W. Sandberg	Lucy Doraine, Nora Gregor, Fred Louis Lerch	Silent	
The Eighteen Year Old	Manfred Noa	Andrée Lafayette, Ernő Verebes	Drama	
The Eleven Devils	Zoltan Korda, Carl Boese	Gustav Fröhlich, Evelyn Holt	Silent	
Endangered Girls	Heinz Schall	Nina Vanna, Margarete Kupfer, Harry Hardt	Silent	
Eva and the Grasshopper	Georg Asagaroff	Camilla Horn, Gustav Fröhlich, Warwick Ward	Silent	
Excluded from the Public	Conrad Wiene	Werner Krauss, Maly Delschaft, Vivian Gibson	Silent	
Fabulous Lola	Richard Eichberg	Lilian Harvey, Harry Halm	Comedy	
Der Fahnenträger von Sedan	Johannes Brandt	Walter Slezak, Camilla von Hollay	Silent	
The False Prince	Heinz Paul	Harry Domela, Ekkehard Arendt	Silent	
Family Gathering in the House of Prellstein	Hans Steinhoff	Erika Glässner, Sig Arno	Comedy	
The Famous Woman	Robert Wiene	Lili Damita, Fred Solm	Drama	
The Field Marshal	Romano Mengon	Cilly Feindt, Harry Hardt	War	
Flirtation	Jacob Fleck, Luise Fleck	Fred Louis Lerch, Henry Stuart, Evelyn Holt	Drama	
Forbidden Love	Friedrich Feher	Magda Sonja, Evi Eva	Drama	
Frühere Verhältnisse	Arthur Bergen	Fritz Kampers, Ossi Oswalda, Paul Heidemann	Comedy	
Der Geheimtresor	Eddie Polo	Erich Kaiser-Titz, Paul Morgan	Thriller	
German Women – German Faithfulness	Wolfgang Neff	Eugen Neufeld, Philipp Manning	Drama	
Ghost Train	Géza von Bolváry	Guy Newall, Louis Ralph	Crime	Co-production with Britain
The Girl from Abroad	Franz Eckstein	Carl Auen, Frida Richard, Albert Steinrück	Silent	
The Girl from Frisco	Wolfgang Neff	Rudolf Klein-Rogge, Erna Morena	Silent	
A Girl of the People	Jacob Fleck, Luise Fleck	Xenia Desni, Harry Liedtke, Livio Pavanelli	Historical	
The Girl with the Five Zeros	Curtis Bernhardt	Elsa Wagner, Veit Harlan	Comedy	
The Girl Without a Homeland	Constantin J. David	Jenny Hasselquist, Oscar Homolka	Drama	Co-production with Austria
The Glass Boat	Constantin J. David	André Nox, Françoise Rosay	Silent	Co-production with France
Die glühende Gasse	Paul Sugar	Hans Albers, Helga Thomas	Silent	
The Golden Abyss	Mario Bonnard	Liane Haid, André Roanne	Silent	
Grand Hotel	Johannes Guter	Mady Christians, Dagny Servaes	Drama	
The Great Unknown	Manfred Noa	Jack Trevor, Andrée Lafayette	Crime	
The Gypsy Baron	Frederic Zelnik	Lya Mara, William Dieterle	Adventure	
His English Wife	Gustaf Molander	Lil Dagover, Gösta Ekman	Drama	Co-production with Sweden
The Great Leap	Arnold Fanck	Leni Riefenstahl, Luis Trenker, Paul Graetz	Comedy	
The Harbour Bride	Wolfgang Neff	John Mylong, Olga Engl, Robert Leffler	Drama	
His Greatest Bluff	Harry Piel, Henrik Galeen	Harry Piel, Marlene Dietrich	Comedy	
His Late Excellency	Adolf E. Licho, Wilhelm Thiele	Willy Fritsch, Olga Chekhova	Silent	
Heads Up, Charley	Willi Wolff	Ellen Richter, Anton Pointner	Comedy	
Heaven on Earth	Alfred Schirokauer, Reinhold Schünzel	Charlotte Ander, Adele Sandrock	Comedy	
Hello Caesar!	Reinhold Schünzel	Mary Nolan, Wilhelm Diegelmann	Comedy	
Höhere Töchter	Richard Löwenbein	Arnold Korff, Grete Mosheim	Silent	
The Holy Lie	Holger-Madsen	Otto Gebühr, Margarete Schlegel	Silent	
Homesick	Gennaro Righelli	Mady Christians, William Dieterle	Drama	
Hotel Rats	Jaap Speyer	Nils Asther, Ellen Kürti	Silent	
How Do I Marry the Boss?	Erich Schönfelder	Henri de Vries, Dina Gralla	Comedy	
The Hunt for the Bride	Georg Jacoby	Stewart Rome, Elga Brink	Silent	
I Stand in the Dark Midnight	Max Mack	Grete Reinwald, Gerd Briese	Silent	
I Was a Student at Heidelberg	Wolfgang Neff	Mary Kid, Eva Speyer	Silent	
Ich habe im Mai von der Liebe geträumt	Franz Seitz	William Dieterle, Grete Reinwald	Silent	
The Imaginary Baron	Willi Wolff	Reinhold Schünzel, Marlene Dietrich	Comedy	
The Impostor	Martin Berger	Ruth Weyher, Anton Pointner, Philipp Manning	Silent	
The Indiscreet Woman	Carl Boese	Jenny Jugo, Maria Paudler	Comedy	
Intoxicated Love	Georg Jacoby	Stewart Rome, Elga Brink	Silent	
The Island of Forbidden Kisses	Georg Jacoby	Stewart Rome, Elga Brink	Adventure	
Im Luxuszug	Erich Schönfelder	Adele Sandrock, Dina Gralla, Leopold von Ledebur	Silent	
King of the Centre Forwards	Fritz Freisler	Fritz Alberti, Colette Brettel	Silent	
Eine kleine Freundin braucht jeder Mann	Paul Heidemann	Julius Falkenstein, Vera Schmiterlöw, Charlotte Ander	Silent	
Klettermaxe	Willy Reiber	Dorothea Wieck, Ruth Weyher	Crime	
The Lady with the Tiger Skin	Willi Wolff	Ellen Richter, Mary Kid, Georg Alexander	Silent	
The Last Waltz	Arthur Robison	Liane Haid, Willy Fritsch	Romance	
Light Cavalry	Rolf Randolf	Alfons Fryland, Vivian Gibson	Silent	
Light-Hearted Isabel	Arthur Wellin	Lee Parry, Gustav Fröhlich	Comedy	
Linden Lady on the Rhine	Rolf Randolf	Maly Delschaft, Carl de Vogt	Comedy	
The Long Intermission	Carl Froelich	Henny Porten, Livio Pavanelli	Drama	
Lord of the Night	Carl Heinz Wolff	Kurt Brenkendorf, Aud Egede-Nissen	Thriller	
The Lorelei	Wolfgang Neff	Renate Brausewetter, Trude Hesterberg	Drama	
Love	Paul Czinner	Elisabeth Bergner, Ágnes Esterházy, Elza Temary	Silent	
The Love of Jeanne Ney	Georg Wilhelm Pabst	Édith Jéhanne, Fritz Rasp	Drama	
Lützow's Wild Hunt	Richard Oswald	Ernst Rückert, Arthur Wellin	Historical	
Madame Dares an Escapade	Hans Otto	Xenia Desni, Livio Pavanelli	Silent	
Make Up	Felix Basch	Marcella Albani, Sandra Milovanoff	Silent	
The Man with the Fake Banknote	Romano Mengon	Nils Asther, Vivian Gibson	Crime	
Der Mann ohne Kopf	Nunzio Malasomma	Carlo Aldini, Grit Haid, Else Reval	Silent	
Marie's Soldier	Erich Schönfelder	Xenia Desni, Harry Liedtke	Drama	
The Marriage Nest	Rudolf Walther-Fein	Livio Pavanelli, Harry Liedtke	Comedy	
The Master of Nuremberg	Ludwig Berger	Rudolf Rittner, Gustav Fröhlich	Historical	
Mata Hari	Friedrich Feher	Magda Sonja, Wolfgang Zilzer	Biopic	
Mary Stuart	Friedrich Feher, Leopold Jessner	Magda Sonja, Fritz Kortner	Historical	
Memoirs of a Nun	Arthur Bergen	Mary Nolan, Georg John	Drama	
Men Before Marriage	Constantin J. David	Nina Vanna, Hanni Weisse, Kurt Vespermann	Silent	
The Merry Farmer	Franz Seitz	Carmen Boni, Werner Krauss	Comedy	
The Merry Vineyard	Jacob Fleck, Luise Fleck	Rudolf Rittner, Camilla Horn, Lotte Neumann	Comedy	
Metropolis	Fritz Lang	Alfred Abel, Brigitte Helm	Science fiction	
The Mistress	Robert Wiene	Harry Liedtke, Eugen Burg	Drama	
The Mistress of the Governor	Friedrich Feher	Magda Sonja, Fritz Kortner	Silent	
A Modern Dubarry	Alexander Korda	María Corda, Alfred Abel	Drama	
The Most Beautiful Legs of Berlin	Willi Wolff	Ellen Richter, Dina Gralla, Bruno Kastner	Comedy	
The Mountain Eagle	Alfred Hitchcock	Nita Naldi, Bernhard Goetzke	Romantic drama	British-German co-production. Lost film
A Murderous Girl	Sidney Morgan	Cilly Feindt, Harry Hardt	Thriller	
My Aunt, Your Aunt	Carl Froelich	Angelo Ferrari, Henny Porten	Comedy	
My Heidelberg, I Can Not Forget You	James Bauer	Dorothea Wieck, Vivian Gibson	Silent	
Nameless Woman	Georg Jacoby	Elga Brink, Jack Trevor	Adventure	
Night of Mystery	Harry Piel	Harry Piel, Dary Holm	Thriller	
On the Banks of the River Weser	Siegfried Philippi	Carl Auen, Olga Engl	Drama	
One Against All	Nunzio Malasomma	Carlo Aldini, Hanni Reinwald	Silent	
One Plus One Equals Three	Felix Basch	Veit Harlan, Georg Alexander, Claire Rommer	Silent	
Orgelstäbe	Oskar Fischinger			
Orient Express	Wilhelm Thiele	Lil Dagover, Heinrich George	Silent	
The Orlov	Jacob Fleck, Luise Fleck	Vivian Gibson, Hans Junkermann	Silent	
Out of the Mist	Fritz Wendhausen	Mady Christians, Werner Fuetterer	Silent	
The Owl	Eddie Polo	Eddie Polo, Erich Kaiser-Titz	Thriller	Released in Two Parts
Paragraph 182	Ernst Winar	Colette Brettel, Gerhard Ritterband	Drama	
Petronella	Hanns Schwarz	Maly Delschaft, William Dieterle, Oscar Homolka	Historical	Co-production with Switzerland
The Pink Slippers	Franz Hofer	Ernst Rückert; Anna von Palen	Drama	
The Pirates of the Baltic Sea	Valy Arnheim	Valy Arnheim, Fritz Kampers	Mystery	
Poor Little Colombine	Franz Seitz	Paul Rehkopf, Hilde Jennings	Drama	
Poor Little Sif	Arthur Bergen	Paul Wegener, Adele Sandrock	Comedy	
Potsdam	Hans Behrendt	Christa Tordy, Hans Stüwe, Camilla von Hollay	Drama	
The Prince's Child	Jacob Fleck, Luise Fleck	Harry Liedtke, Vivian Gibson, Evi Eva	Comedy	
Prinz Louis Ferdinand	Hans Behrendt	Christa Tordy, Hans Stüwe	Historical	
The Prince of Pappenheim	Richard Eichberg	Mona Maris, Curt Bois, Dina Gralla, Lydia Potechina	Comedy	
The Prisoners of Shanghai	Géza von Bolváry, Augusto Genina	Carmen Boni, Jack Trevor	Drama	
The Queen of the Variety	Johannes Guter	Ellen Kürti, Harry Halm	Comedy	
Regine	Erich Waschneck	Lee Parry, Harry Liedtke, Vivian Gibson	Drama	
The Right to Live	Robert Wohlmuth	Maly Delschaft, Erna Morena, Elizza La Porta	Drama	Co-production with Austria
Rinaldo Rinaldini	Max Obal, Rudolf Dworsky	Luciano Albertini, Olga Engl	Adventure	
The Spinning Ball	Erich Schönfelder	Harry Liedtke, Erna Morena	Silent	
Queen of the Boulevards	Manfred Noa	Paul Wegener, Andrée Lafayette	Drama	
Queen Louise	Karl Grune	Mady Christians, Mathias Wieman	Historical	Released in Two Parts
The Queen of Spades	Aleksandr Razumny	Jenny Jugo, Rudolf Forster	Drama	
The Queen Was in the Parlour	Graham Cutts	Lili Damita, Louis Ralph	Drama	
R-1 Ein Formspiel	Oskar Fischinger			
Radio Magic	Richard Oswald	Werner Krauss, Xenia Desni	Comedy	
Die raffinierteste Frau Berlins	Franz Osten	Mary Johnson, Luigi Serventi, Nina Vanna	Drama	
Rhenish Girls and Rhenish Wine	Johannes Guter	Xenia Desni, Jack Trevor	Silent	
The Salvation Army Girl	William Kahn	Camilla von Hollay, Ernst Rückert	Silent	
The Sea	Peter Paul Felner	Heinrich George, Olga Chekhova	Drama	
A Serious Case	Felix Basch	Ossi Oswalda, Alfons Fryland	Comedy	
Der Sieg der Jugend	Fred Sauer	Hans Brausewetter, Charlotte Susa	Silent	
Sindflut	Josef Berger			
Sister Veronika	Gerhard Lamprecht	Aud Egede-Nissen, Paul Richter	Drama	
Das Spielzeug einer schönen Frau	Fritz Freisler	Ruth Weyher, Evi Eva	Silent	
The Sporck Battalion	Holger-Madsen	Otto Gebühr, Walter Rilla, Grete Mosheim	War	
The Standard-Bearer of Sedan	Johannes Brandt	Walter Slezak, Camilla von Hollay, Vera Schmiterlöw	Historical	
Stolzenfels am Rhein	Richard Löwenbein	Eduard von Winterstein, Maria Minzenti, Grete Reinwald	Silent	
Storm Tide	Willy Reiber	Dorothea Wieck, Helen von Münchofen	Silent	
Der Sträflingskavalier	Rudolf Meinhard-Jünger	Hilde Jennings, Johanna Ewald	Silent	
The Strange Case of Captain Ramper	Max Reichmann	Paul Wegener, Max Schreck	Drama	
Students' Love	Robert Land	Fritz Kortner, Agnes Straub, Wolfgang Zilzer	Silent	
Svengali	Gennaro Righelli	Paul Wegener, Anita Dorris	Drama	
That Dangerous Age	Jenő Illés	Asta Nielsen, Bernhard Goetzke	Drama	
That Was Heidelberg on Summer Nights	Emmerich Hanus	Fritz Alberti, Charlotte Susa	Romance	
Their Last Love Affair	Max Reichmann	Gustav Fröhlich, Carmen Boni	Romance	
Tough Guys, Easy Girls	Carl Boese	Lissy Arna, Gustav Fröhlich	Comedy	
The Tragedy of a Lost Soul	Hans Steinhoff	Alfred Abel, Helga Molander	Drama	
Tragedy of a Marriage	Maurice Elvey	Isobel Elsom, Alfred Abel, Paul Richter	Drama	
Tragedy of the Street	Bruno Rahn	Asta Nielsen, Oscar Homolka	Drama	
Die 3 Niemandskinder	Fritz Freisler	Xenia Desni, Willi Forst, Adele Sandrock	Drama	
The Transformation of Dr. Bessel	Richard Oswald	Jakob Tiedtke, Sophie Pagay	Silent	
The Trial of Donald Westhof	Fritz Wendhausen	Oscar Homolka, Karin Evans	Crime	
The Trousers	Hans Behrendt	Werner Krauss, Jenny Jugo	Comedy	
Two Under the Stars	Johannes Guter	Margarete Schlegel, Ernst Deutsch	Silent	
U-9 Weddigen	Heinz Paul	Carl de Vogt, Ernst Hofmann	War	
Vacation from Marriage	Victor Janson	Harry Halm, Lilian Harvey, Jutta Jol	Comedy	
Valencia	Jaap Speyer	Dorothea Wieck, Oskar Marion, Johannes Riemann	Silent	
Venus in Evening Wear	Robert Land	Carmen Boni, Georg Alexander	Silent	
The Vice of Humanity	Rudolf Meinert	Asta Nielsen, Werner Krauss	Drama	
The Villa in Tiergarten Park	Franz Osten	Joe Stöckel, Aud Egede-Nissen	Romance	
Was die Kinder ihren Eltern verschweigen	Franz Osten	Erich Kaiser-Titz, Nina Vanna, Mary Johnson	Drama	
The Ways of Love Are Strange	Fritz Kaufmann	Maly Delschaft, Walter Slezak, Fritz Alberti	Drama	
The Weavers	Frederic Zelnik	Paul Wegener, Valeska Stock	Drama	
Weekend Magic	Rudolf Walther-Fein	Harry Liedtke, Lissy Arna	Romance	
Die Welt ohne Waffen	Gernot Bock-Stieber	Paul Wegener, Carl Auen, Hanni Reinwald	Drama	
Wenn Menschen reif zur Liebe warden	Jacob Fleck, Luise Fleck	Evelyn Holt, Henry Stuart, Egon von Jordan	Drama	
Wer wirft den ersten Stein?	Erich Eriksen	Kurt Gerron, Hella Kürty	Silent	
When the Young Wine Blossoms	Carl Wilhelm	Robert Scholz, Lotte Lorring	Comedy	
The White Slave	Augusto Genina	Liane Haid, Vladimir Gajdarov	Drama	
The White Spider	Carl Boese	Maria Paudler, Walter Rilla, John Loder	Silent	
Witches' Night	James Bauer	Gerd Briese, Vivian Gibson	Silent	
The Woman in the Cupboard	Rudolf Biebrach	Willy Fritsch, Fee Malten	Comedy	
The Woman Who Couldn't Say No	Fred Sauer	Lee Parry, Gustav Fröhlich	Silent	
The Woman with the World Record	Erich Waschneck	Lee Parry, Henry Stuart	Silent	
You Walk So Softly	Reinhold Schünzel	Reinhold Schünzel, Jakob Tiedtke	Silent	

== Documentaries ==
Title	Director	Featured cast	Genre	Note
...und hätte der Liebe nicht	Gertrud David		documentary	
Acht Maler und ein Modell	Alwin Steinitz		documentary	
An African Adventurell			documentary	
Assorted Babies			documentary	Released in the US as one of the MGM Oddities
Berlin: Die Sinfonie der Großstadt (Berlin: Symphony of a Great City)	Walter Ruttmann		Experimental documentary	Runtime: 65 min.
Bilder aus der Sudan-Pionier-Mission im Nillande			documentary	
Dog Days			documentary	Released in the US as one of the MGM Oddities
Erfinderin Natur	Ulrich K. T. Schultz		documentary	
Fahrendes Volk	Christoph Maria Baumann		documentary	
Die fränkische Schweiz	Christoph Maria Baumann		documentary	
Das heilige Land und Vater Schnellers Liebeswerk			documentary	
Helfende Liebe – Kaiserswerther Schwestern daheim und im Morgenlande			documentary	
Hidden Death Traps			documentary	Released in the US as one of the MGM Oddities
Die innere Mission in den Nöten und Leiden des Alltags	Gertrud David		documentary	
Jackie Coogan in Europa			documentary	
Jewels of Venus			documentary	Released in the US as one of the MGM Oddities
Im Lande des silbernen Löwen	Bernhard Kellermann		documentary	
Kling, klang Gloria	Gertrud David		documentary	
The Lion Hunt			documentary	Released in the US as one of the MGM Oddities
Die Machnower Schleuse	Phil Jutzi		documentary	
Mosaik	Hans Cürlis		documentary	
Natur und Liebe	Ulrich K. T. Schultz		documentary	
The Parasol Ant			documentary	Released in the US as one of the MGM Oddities
Soaring Wings			documentary	Released in the US as one of the MGM Oddities
Eine Symphonie des Kampfwillens (A Symphony of the Will to Fight)			NSDAP propaganda	The first documentary of a Nuremberg Rally
Tierkünste unter der Zeitlupe	Ulrich K. T. Schultz		documentary	
Vom Reiche der sechs Punkte	Hugo Rütters		documentary	
Im Vogelschutzgebiet auf Langeoog	Ulrich K. T. Schultz		documentary	
Die von der Sanitätskolonne	Gertrud David		documentary	
Der Weltkrieg, 1. Teil – Des Volkes Heldengang	Léo Lasko		documentary	
Winged Death			documentary	Released in the US as one of the MGM Oddities

== Animation ==
Title	Director	Featured cast	Genre	Note
The Chinese Nightingale	Lotte Reiniger		animation	
Dort, wo der Rhein...	Walter Ruttmann		Animation	
Im Filmatelier	Julius Pinschewer		animation	

== Other ==
Title	Director	Featured cast	Genre	Note
München-Berlin Wanderung	Oskar Fischinger		Experimental film	
Seelische Konstruktionen (Spiritual Construction)	Oskar Fischinger		Experimental film	Runtime: 10 min.
Wachsexperimente	Oskar Fischinger		experimental film	"Wax experiments"
