= Hotel of Secrets =

1929 film

- Directed by: Friedrich Feher
- Written by: Anton Kuh
- Starring: Gertrud Eysoldt; Magda Sonja; Angelo Ferrari
- Cinematography: Leopold Kutzleb
- Music by: Bernard Homola
- Production company: Deutsch-Russische Film-Allianz
- Release date: 19 March 1929
- Running time: 95 miunutes
- Country: Germany
- Languages: Silent; German intertitles

Hotel of Secrets (German: Hotelgeheimnisse) or The Adventuress from Biarritz (Die Abenteurerin von Biarritz) is a 1929 German silent film directed by Friedrich Feher and starring Gertrud Eysoldt, Magda Sonja and Angelo Ferrari. It was shot at the Staaken Studios in Berlin and on location in Biarritz. The film's art direction was by Ernst Meiwers and Ernö Metzner.

== Cast ==
- Gertrud Eysoldt as Herzogin
- Magda Sonja as Gesellschafterin der Herzogin
- Angelo Ferrari as Der Hochstapler
- Wolfgang Zilzer as Komplize des Hochstaplers
- Livio Pavanelli as Prosecutor
- Gertrud de Lalsky as Gräfin de Suzy
- May Calvin as Lila
- Harry Frank as Lilas Verlobter
- Alfred Gerasch as Kriminalinspektor
- Bobby Burns as Kind

== Bibliography ==
- Sara Pendergast. Writers and production artists. St. James Press, 2000.
