= The Grey House =

1926 silent drama film

- Directed by: Friedrich Feher
- Written by: Georg Hirschfeld; Herbert Juttke; Georg C. Klaren
- Starring: Magda Sonja; Erna Morena; Werner Krauss
- Cinematography: Max Fassbender; Gustave Preiss
- Music by: Hans May
- Production company: Internationaler Film
- Distributed by: Internationaler Film
- Release date: 22 October 1926
- Running time: 107 minutes
- Country: Germany
- Languages: Silent; German intertitles

The Grey House (German: Das graue Haus) is a 1926 German silent drama film directed by Friedrich Feher and starring Magda Sonja, Erna Morena and Werner Krauss. It was shot at the Staaken Studios in Berlin. The film's sets were designed by the art director Alfred Kunz.

== Cast ==
- Magda Sonja as Maria
- Erna Morena as Hochstaplerin
- Werner Krauss as Vater
- Gretl Dupont as Die Spitzbübin
- Angelo Ferrari as Hochstapler
- Alf Blütecher as Herzog
- Lotte Lorring as Die Herzogin
- Gustav Adolf Semler as Arzt
- Julia Serda as Mutter
- Georg John as Der Henker
- Eva Speyer as Die Kranke

== Bibliography ==
- Bock, Hans-Michael & Bergfelder, Tim. The Concise CineGraph. Encyclopedia of German Cinema. Berghahn Books, 2009.
