= Leo Birinski =

Russian playwright, screenwriter and director

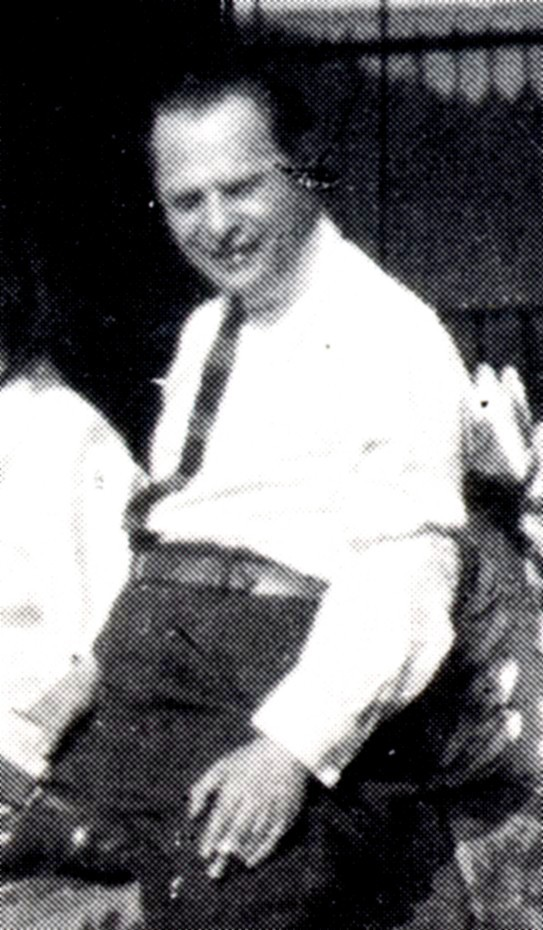
- Leo Birinski (approx. 1923)
- Born: June 8, 1884; Lysianka, Kiev Governorate, Russian Empire (in present-day Cherkasy Oblast, Ukraine)
- Died: October 23, 1951 (aged 67); The Bronx, New York City, NY, United States
- Resting place: Potter's Field, Hart Island, New York City
- Other name: Leo Gottesmann
- Occupations: Screenwriter, Film director Playwright
- Spouse: Felicia Aschkenas
- Parent(s): Hersch (Hermann) Gottesmann (father), Carna Birinska (mother)

Leo Birinski (June 8, 1884 – October 23, 1951) was a playwright, screenwriter and director. He worked in Austria-Hungary, Germany and in the United States. As a playwright in Europe, he gained his biggest popularity from 1910 to 1917 but was ultimately forgotten. From the 1920s to 1940s he worked mainly as a screenwriter, first in Germany, later in the United States, to which he emigrated in September 1927. In the United States, he also returned to writing stage plays. He wrote in German and English. Until recently, only a minimal amount of information about his life has been available. Complicating matters, there have been many legends and rumours concerning Birinski's person, including the false report of his "suicide" in 1920 that found its way from newspaper obituaries into encyclopedias.

== Variations in his name ==
Born Leo Gottesmann, he was most commonly known as Leo Birinski, the name he began to use after approximately 1908. “Birinski” was his mother's surname, and “Gottesmann,” his birth name, was his father's surname.

Other recorded variations in spelling and form: Leo G. Birinski, Leo Birinsky, Lev G. Birinski, Lev Birinskij, Lav Birinski, Leó Birinszki, Lev Birinszki, and Leon Birinski.

== Biography ==
The circumstances of Birinski's early life are unclear, as; different sources offer a variety of possibilities for his place and date of birth.

He was probably born on June 8, 1884, in Lysianka, Kiev Governorate, Russian Empire (in present-day Ukraine). He occasionally presented this information in official documents, though it is impossible to confirm because the local birth records for Lysianka were not preserved.

His father, Hersch Gottesmann, was born in Borschiv in eastern Galicia and was a salesman (he indicated "Agent" as his employment in registration forms). His mother, Carna, born Berinska or Birinska, was a tenant's daughter from Lysianka. Birinski spent his childhood in Ukraine and Czernowitz, the capital city of the Austro-Hungarian province of Bukovina.

At the beginning of the 20th century (either in 1901 or 1904, according to varying sources), he moved to Vienna. He worked in a bookshop, turned to translating, and started to write by himself. During his time in Vienna, he wrote three plays, the tragedies, Der Moloch (The Moloch) and Raskolnikoff (after the novel Crime and Punishment by Dostoevsky), and his most successful comedy or tragicomedy, Narrentanz (Dance of Fools), written in 1912. In March 1920, a rumor of suicide, caused by a case of mistaken identity with a man named Leon Gottesmann, was spread in the local newspapers. Although repeatedly discredited, the report was included in several contemporary encyclopedias. In April 1921, Birinski left Vienna and moved to Berlin.

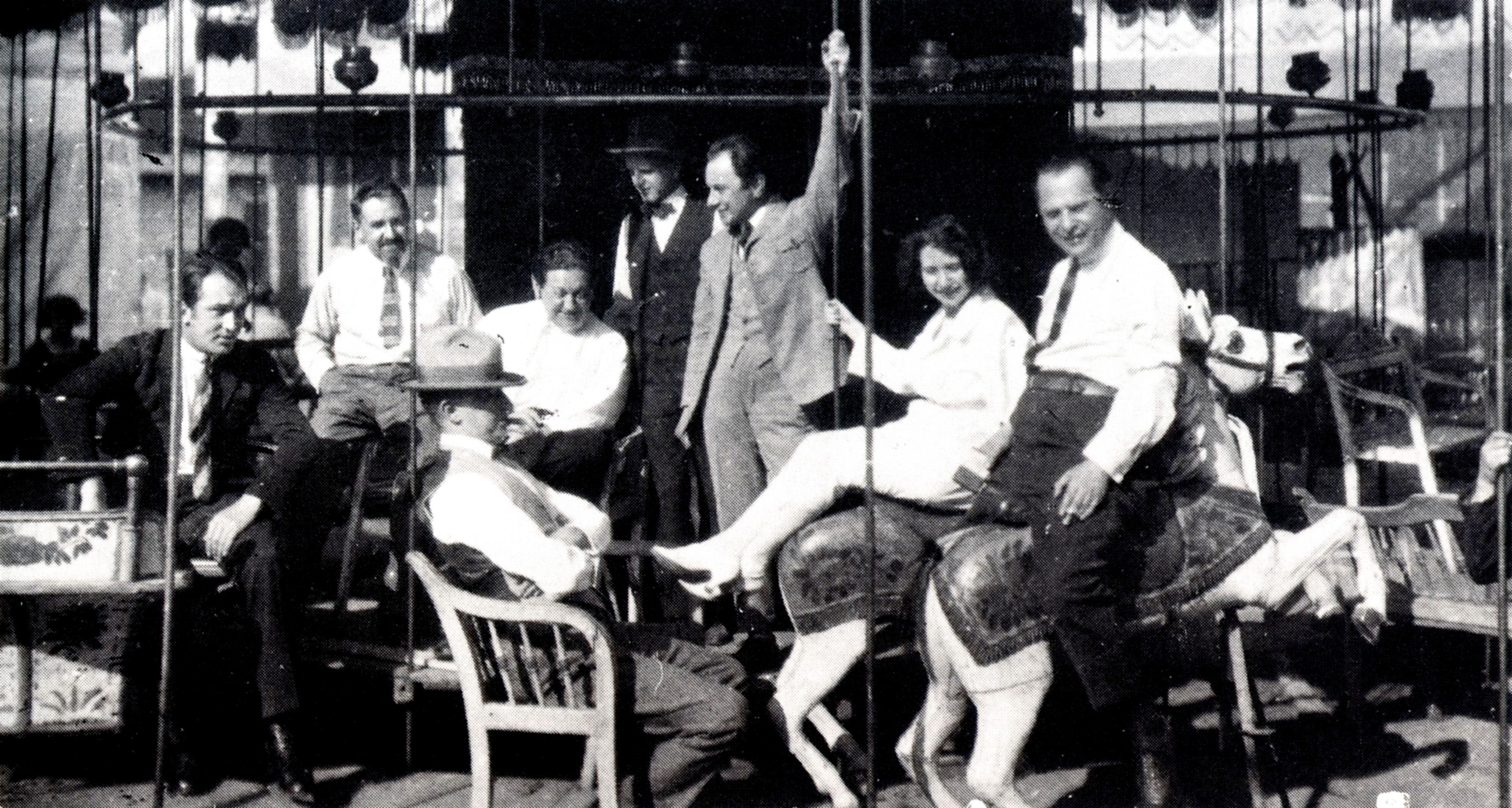
One of the few known images of Birinski. Break during the shooting of the motion picture Das Wachsfigurenkabinett; Leo Birinski is on the right, sitting on the white horse (c. 1923).

In Germany, Birinski appears to have married Jewish pianist Felicia Aschkenas, who born around 1902 in Warsaw. At this time, he worked primarily for the film industry, wrote many screenplays, and together with Paul Leni, directed the motion picture Das Wachsfigurenkabinett. During his time in Germany, he contributed to the screenplays of thirteen films, including Tragedy of Love with Marlene Dietrich, Varieté by Ewald André Dupont, and several pictures by Gennaro Righelli. Birinski also wrote the stage play, Der heilige Teufel (Rasputin). Its original German text was lost, but a later English version still exists. Around September 1927, Birinski left for the USA; two years later, his wife followed him. They both identified themselves to the immigration officers by Nicaraguan passports. Birinski even listed the city of Bluefields in Nicaragua as his birthplace. He had no known ties to Nicaragua.

In the United States, he continued his work as a screenwriter and director and worked on ten documented films. His first American work was probably as the director of Das große Glück – the German version of A Ship Comes In from 1928. His other notable films of the period include Mata Hari with Greta Garbo, Mamoulian's movie, The Song of Songs, with Marlene Dietrich, and The Gay Desperado. He again took on the role of film director with Flirtation in 1934. The last known picture by Birinski was the spy comedy, The Lady Has Plans, in 1942. An adaptation of this film for the radio series, Lux Radio Theater, was also created and broadcast in April 1943 on the CBS radio network with Rita Hayworth and William Powell in the leads.

Birinski also wrote several stage plays in the United States. His play, Nowhere Bound, was presented on Broadway in January 1935 at the Imperial Theatre, and The Day Will Come in September 1944 at the National Theatre. In addition to these works, a manuscript of a stage play, The Holy Devil (Rasputin), by Birinski was found among the papers left by Herman Bernstein, a journalist and writer who died in August 1935. This play was likely never performed or published.

The events of the last seven years of Birinski's life are largely unknown. According to his death certificate, Leo Birinski died on October 23, 1951, at Lincoln Hospital in The Bronx, New York City. The certificate includes almost no information about the deceased. It appears that Birinski died in poverty and alone. He was buried at the Potter's Field at Hart Island in a mass-grave ("plot 45, section 2, no. 14"). In 2009, Birinski's relatives living in Israel and the United States were found.

== Works ==
=== Theatre ===
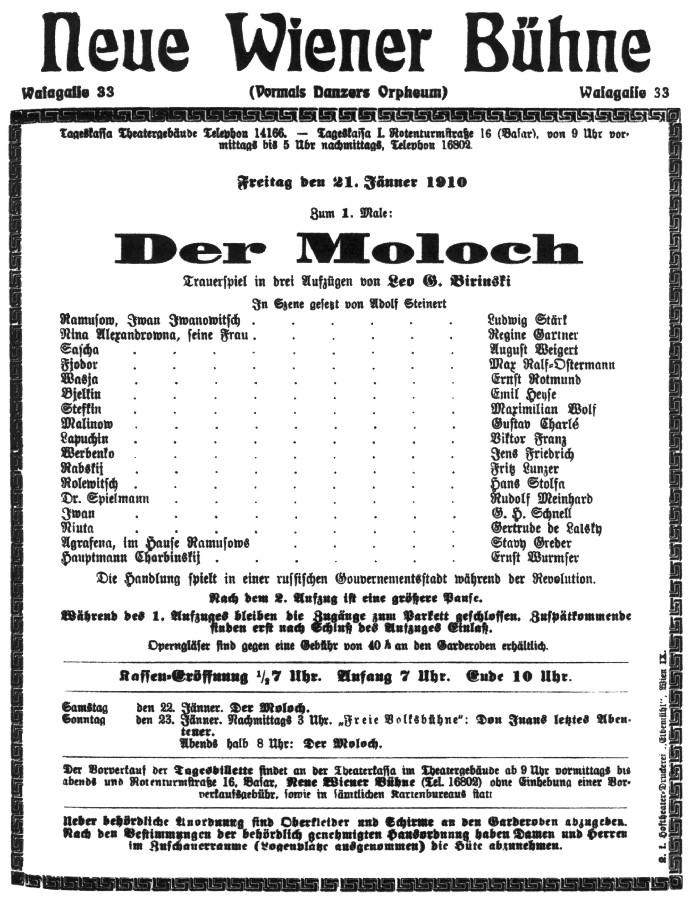
Poster for world premiere of Moloch. Neue Wiener Bühne Vienna: January 21, 1910.

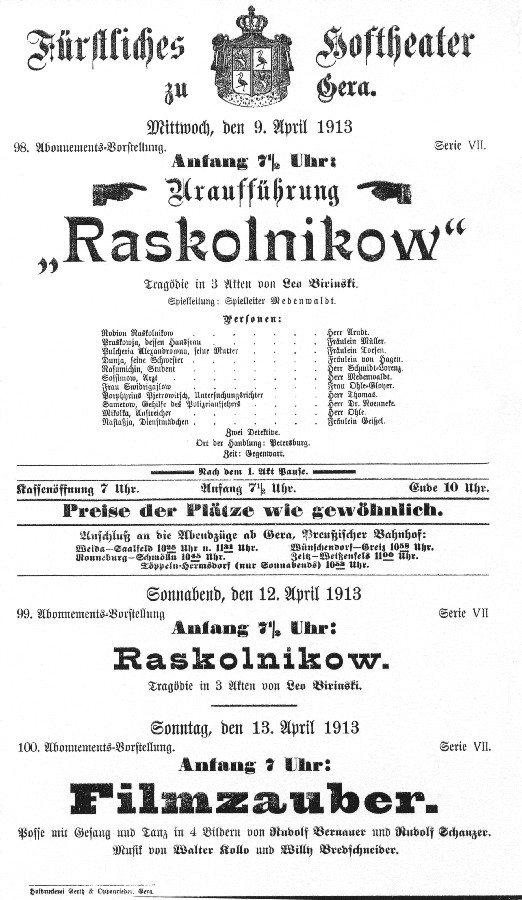
Poster for world premiere of Raskolnikoff. Fürstliches Hoftheater Gera: April 9, 1913.

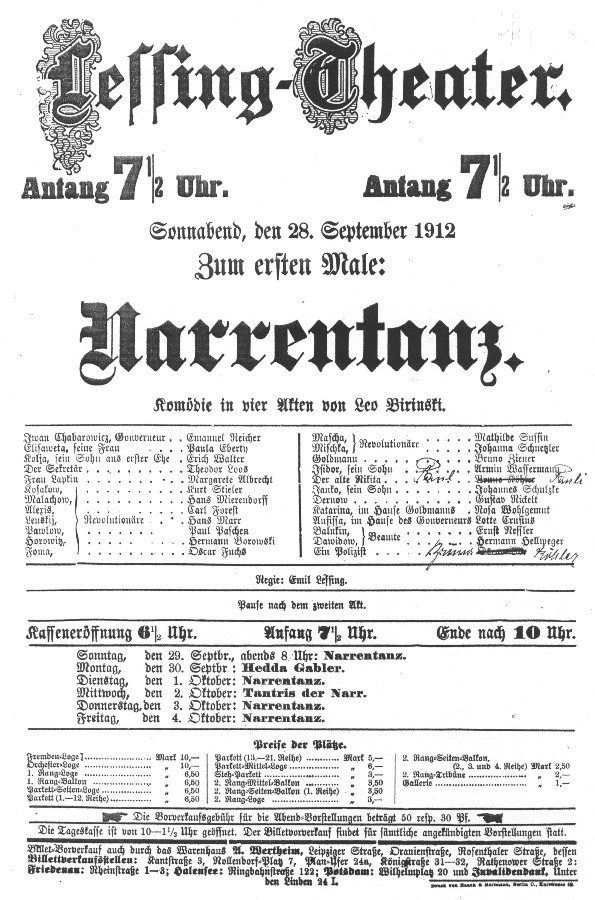
Poster for world premiere of Narrentanz. Lessing-Theater Berlin: September 28, 1912.

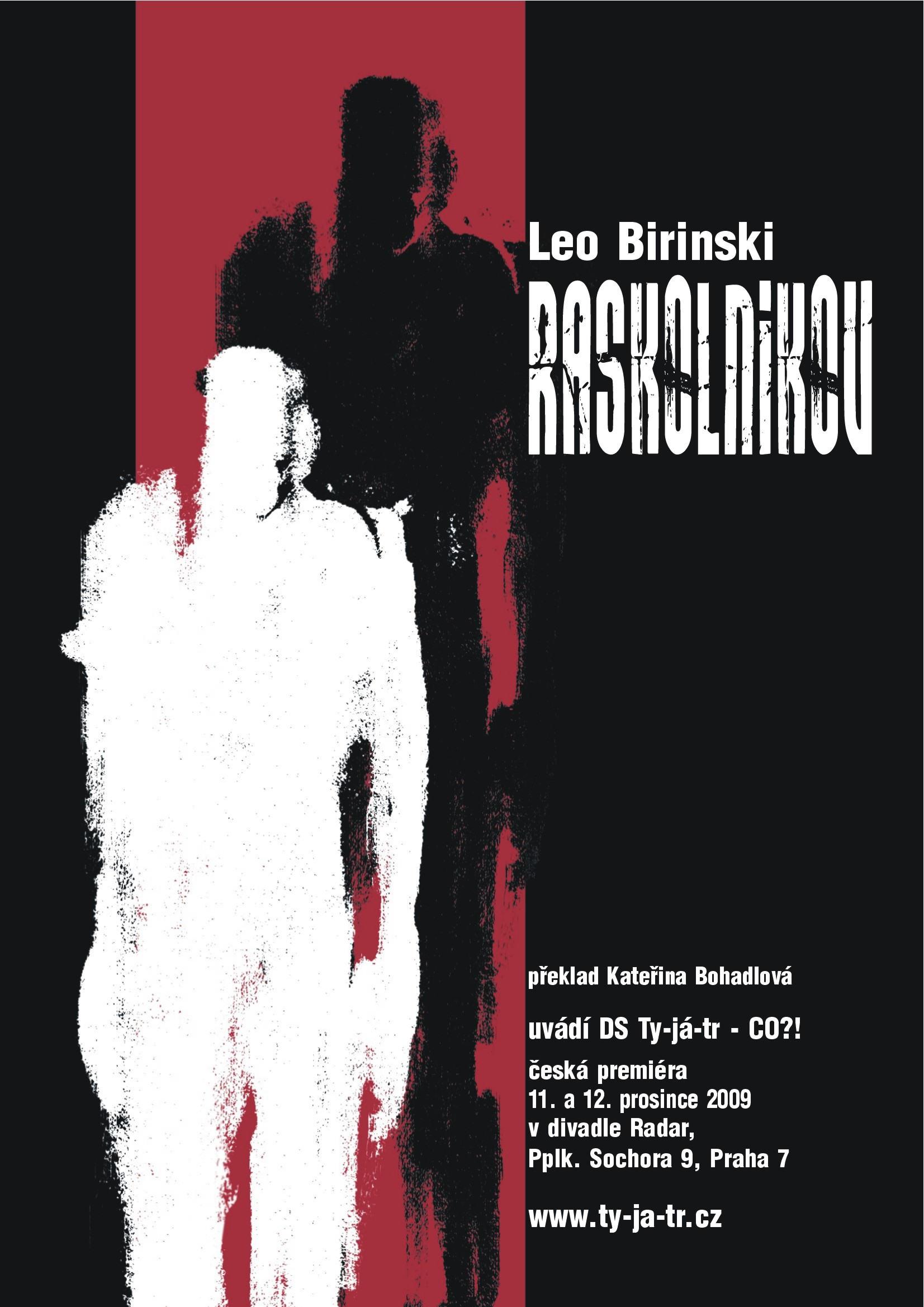
Poster for Czech premiere of Raskolnikov. Theatre Ty-já-tr Prague: December 11, 2009.
- Der Moloch (The Moloch), tragedy in three acts (1910). Premiere: January 21, 1910, Neue Wiener Bühne Vienna.
  - Other productions in German: Modernes Theater Berlin (1910), Deutsches Theater Cologne (1911), Volkstheater Munich (season 1910 / 1911), Altes Stadt-Theater Leipzig (season 1910 / 1911) etc.
  - Translated into:
    - Czech: Vincenc Červinka (1910), title Moloch, not produced, published in 1924.
    - Slovenian: Etbin Kristan (1910), title Moloh, production in Ljubljana (1910), Trieste (1912), Maribor (1925).
    - Croatian: August Harambašić (1911), title Moloh, production in Zagreb (1911).
- Raskolnikoff (aka Raskolnikow), tragedy in three acts after Dostoevsky (the first reference in 1910, published 1912). Play based on the novel Crime and Punishment. Premiere: April 9, 1913, Fürstliches Hoftheater Gera.
  - Other productions in German: Residenz-Theater Berlin (1917), Wiener Kammerspiele Vienna (1917).
  - Translated into:
    - Croatian: Joza Ivakić (1916), title Raskoljnikov, production in Osijek (1916).
    - Slovenian: Silvester Škerl (1922), title Raskolnikov, production in Maribor (1922).
    - Czech: Kateřina Bohadlová (2007), title Raskolnikov, produced by theatre Ty-já-tr in Prague in 2009 (as stage reading in 2007).
- Narrentanz (The Dance of Fools), tragicomedy in four acts (1912). Premiere: September 28, 1912, Lessing-Theater Berlin.
  - Global premiere at the same time on September 28, 1912: Neues Deutsches Theater Prague, Neue Wiener Bühne Vienna, Schauspielhaus Munich, Schauspielhaus Dresden, Schauspielhaus Cologne, Stadttheater Königsberg (now Kaliningrad), Schauspielhaus Leipzig, Neues Theater Frankfurt, and Deutsches Theater Hannover.
  - Other productions in German: about 40 productions in various towns through the whole German language area. On November 13, 1912, it was produced even at Irving Place German Theatre in New York City.
  - Reversal translation from Czech into German (!!!): Jiří Vrba and Stephan Stroux (1969), title Mummenschanz. Premiere: September 5, 1971, Volkstheater, Vienna.
  - Translated into:
    - Czech: Vincenc Červinka (1912), title Mumraj, production in National Theatre Prague (1912), National Theatre Brno (1912 at a former house), amateur theatre Maryša Prague (1976), The Drama Club Prague (1991), The Vinohrady Theatre Prague (2009), The Drama Club Prague (2017) etc.
    - Polish: Jarosław Czesław Pieniążek (1913), title Taniec czynowników, production in Lviv – Teatr miejski (City Theatre, 1913), Kraków (1913 and 1920), Poznań (1913), Warsaw (1915), Łódź (1915), Lublin (1915), Płock (1915), Vilnius (1922).
    - Slovenian: Anton Melik (1913), title Vrtoglavci, production in Ljubljana (1913), Nova Gorica (1987).
    - Hungarian: Ferenc Herczeg (1913), title Bolondok tánca, production in Budapest (1913). Miklós Győrffy (1994), title Bolondok tánca; production in Szeged (1994), Marosvásárhely (1995), Budapest (1998), Pécs (2009). An unknown translator (2002), title Maskarádé, production in Budapest (2002).
    - Danish: Carl Behrens (1913), title Narredans, production in Copenhagen (1913).
    - Dutch: Herman Heijermans (1913), title Narrendans, production in Amsterdam (1914).
    - French: Maurice Rémon (1914), title La Danse des fous, production in Paris (1914).
    - Macedonian: Vladimir Milčin (1980), title Бркотница (Brkotnica), production in Skopje (1980).
    - Croatian: Tomislav Lipljin (1982), title Maskerada, production in Varaždin (1982).
    - Serbian: Vida Ognjenović (1988), title Луда игрa (Luda igra), production in Novi Sad (1988).
    - Slovak: Martin Porubjak (1991), title Chaos, production in Bratislava (1991).
    - Russian: Oleg Malevych and Viktoria Kamenskaya (2004), title: Хоровод масок (Khorovod masok), in: Baltiyskiye sezony no. 10/2004, Saint Petersburg. Produced as one-time diploma performance at State Theater Institute in Yaroslavl (June 2010).
    - There are mentioned translations into English and Japanese too, but they are not credited.
- Nur Ruhe!, farce in three acts by Johann Nestroy, adapted for modern stage by Leo Birinski (published 1913). Premiere: January 5, 1914, Deutsches Volkstheater Vienna.
- Der heilige Teufel (Rasputin), play written before 1927. Not published and not produced till this time. Its German text was not found.
- The Holy Devil (Rasputin), play in three acts (written before 1935). English version of the older German play. Not published and not produced till this time. Typescript of its text was found in Herman Bernstein papers.
- Nowhere Bound, play in three acts (1935). Premiere: January 22, 1935, Imperial Theatre New York City. Director: Archimedes H. van Buren.
- The Day Will Come, play in three acts (1944). Premiere: September 7, 1944, National Theatre New York City. Director: Lee Elmore.
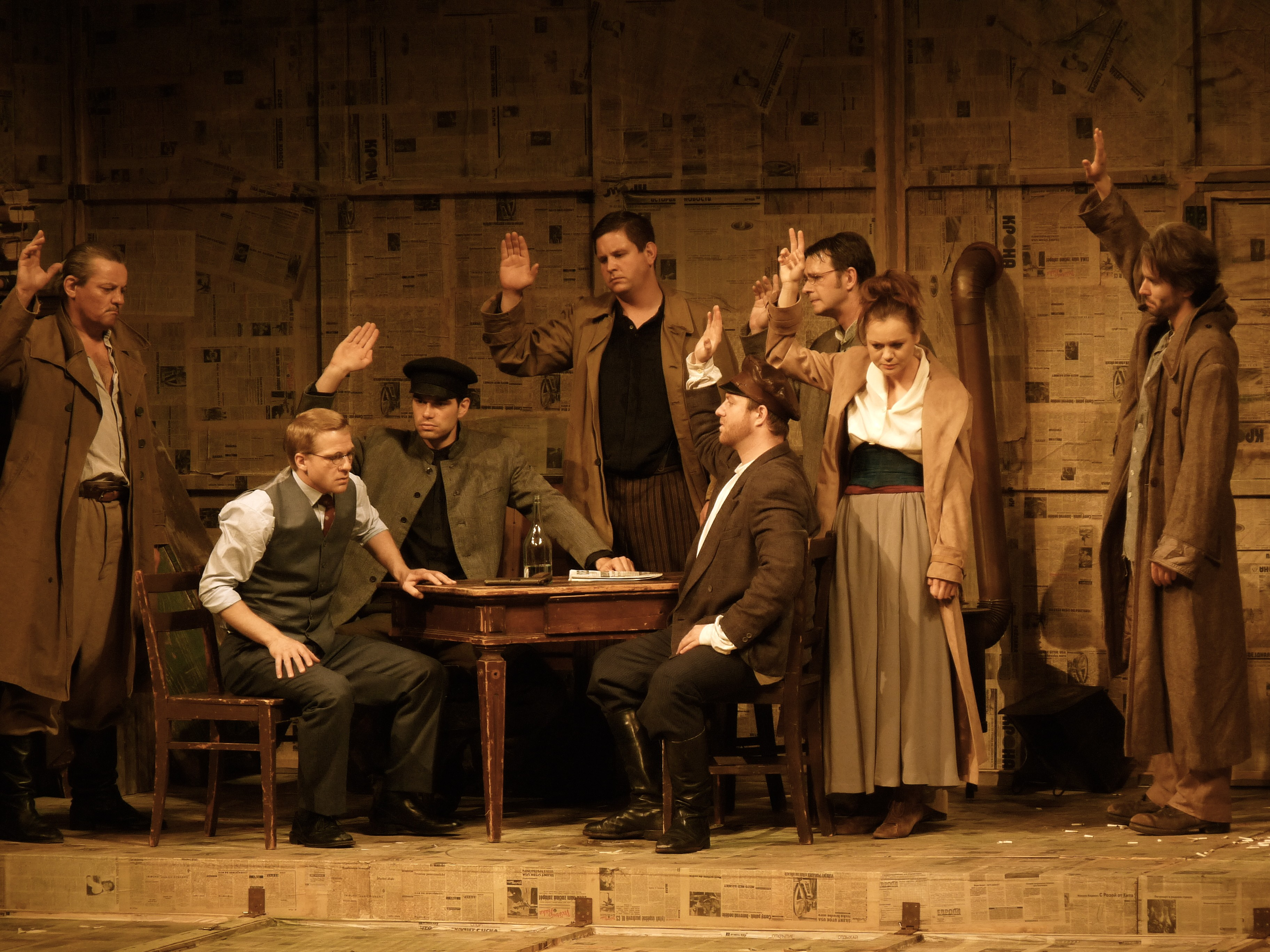
Mumraj (Narrentanz) in The Vinohrady Theatre, Prague, 2009.

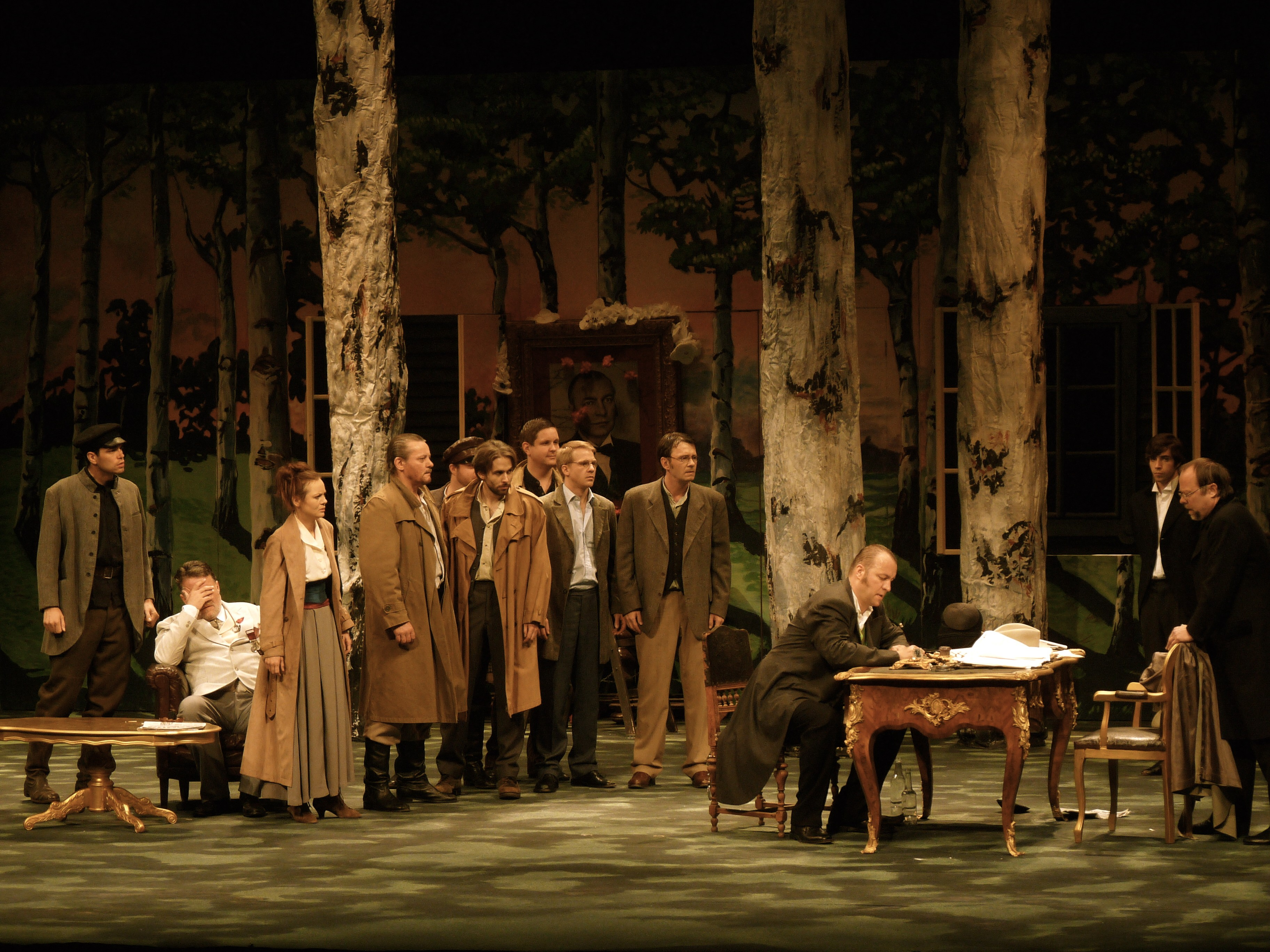
Mumraj (Narrentanz) in The Vinohrady Theatre, Prague, 2009.
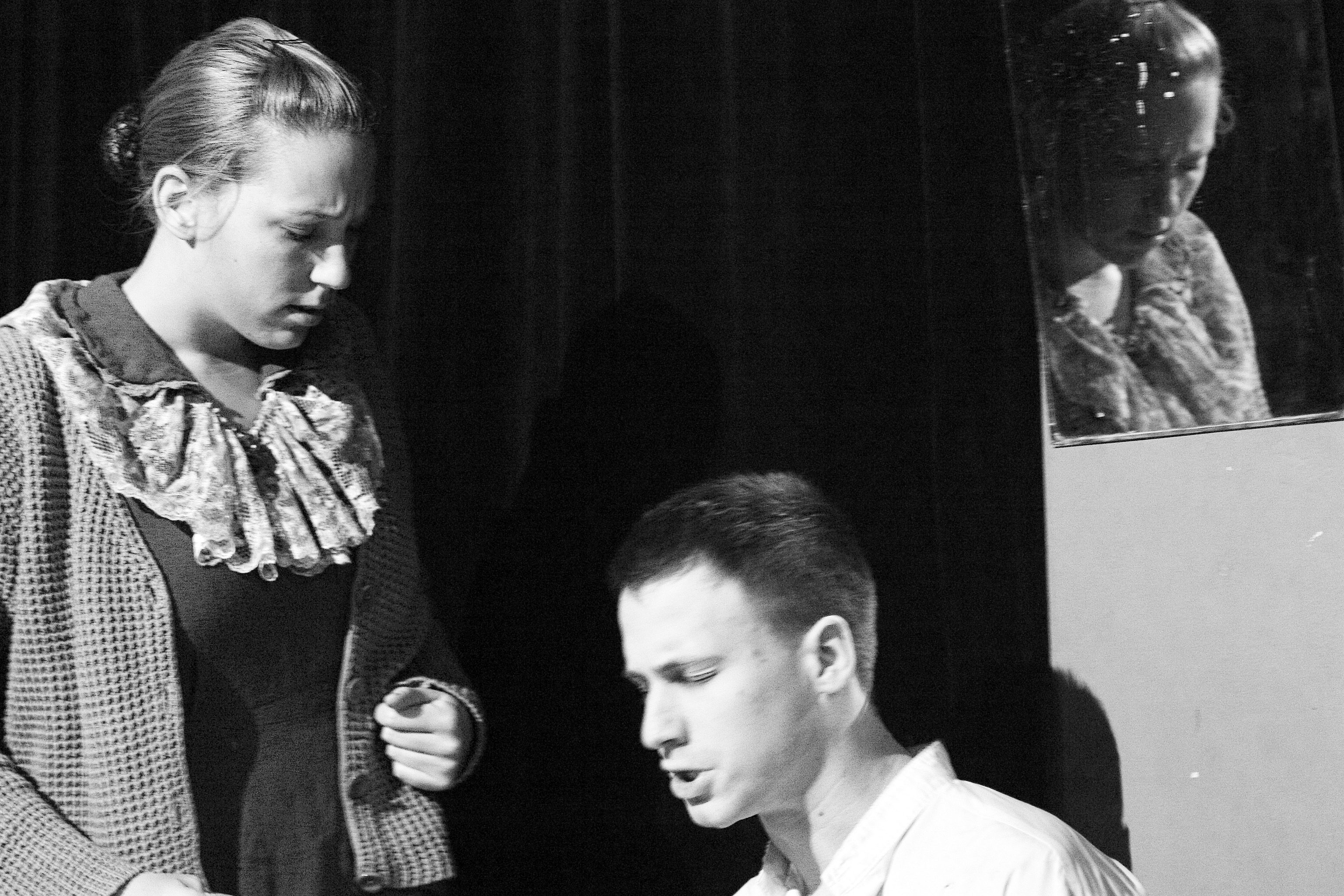
Raskolnikov in theatre Ty-já-tr, Prague 2009.

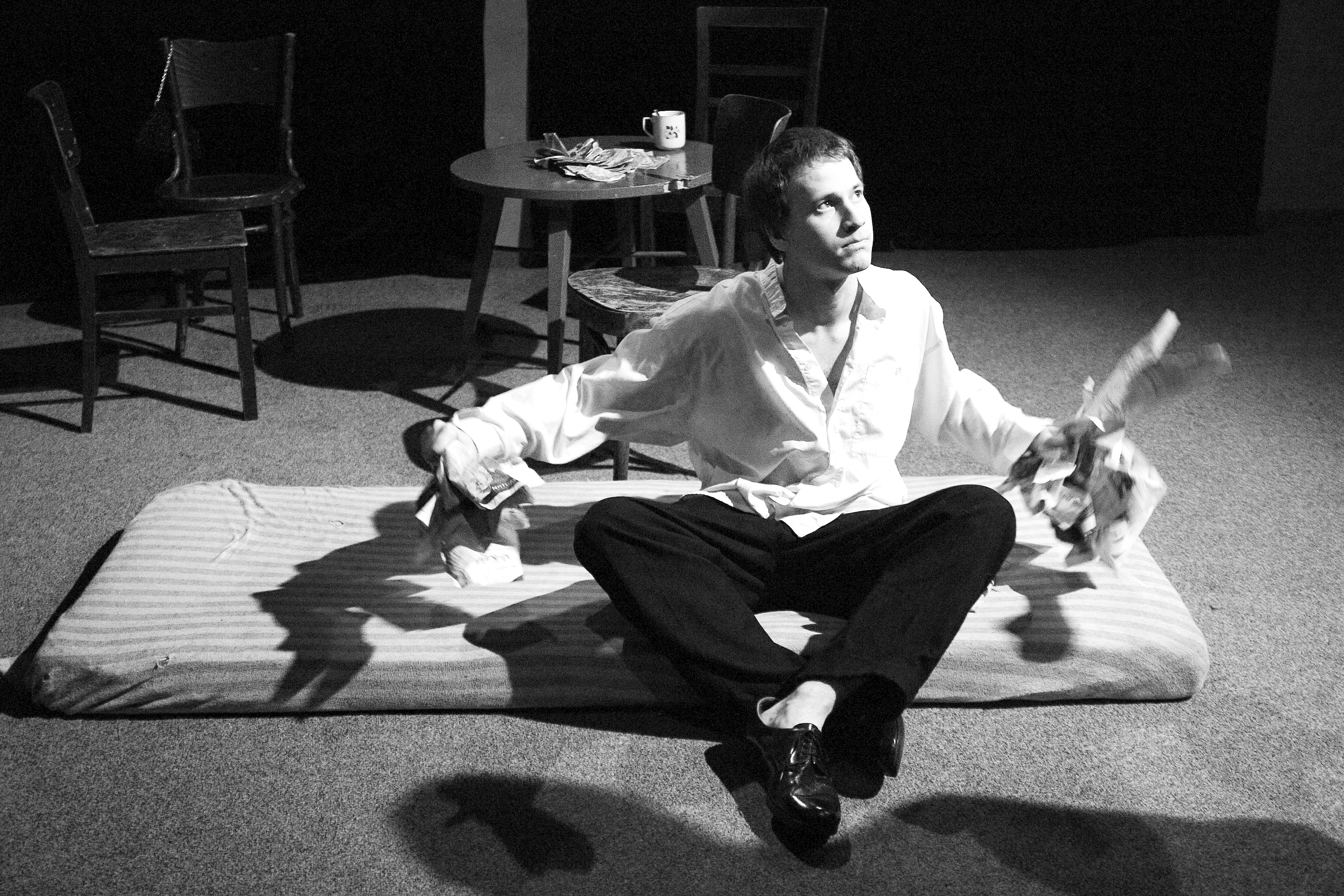
Raskolnikov in theatre Ty-já-tr, Prague 2009.

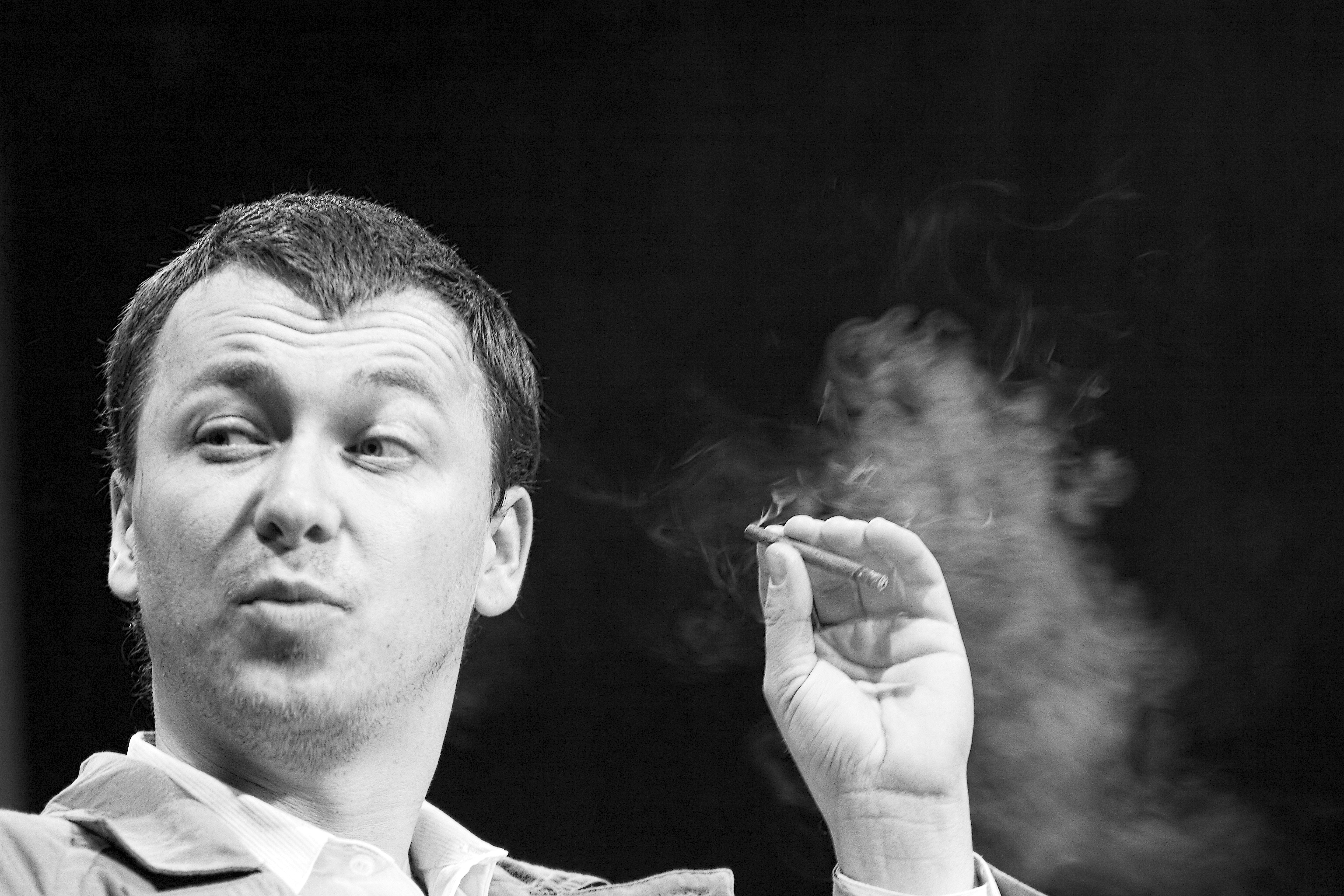
Raskolnikov in theatre Ty-já-tr, Prague 2009.

=== Film ===
- Tragedy of Love – screenplay, Germany 1923. Director: Joe May, starring: Emil Jannings, Mia May, Charlotte Ander, Marlene Dietrich. Movie studio: May-Film.
- Waxworks – second director and producer, Germany 1924. The main director: Paul Leni, starring: Wilhelm Dieterle, Emil Jannings, Werner Krauss, Conrad Veidt, Olga Belajeff. Movie studio: Neptun Film AG.
- Love's Finale – screenplay, Germany 1925. Director: Felix Basch, starring: Lucy Doraine. Movie studio: Lucy Doraine-Film GmbH.
- Variety – screenplay, Germany 1925. Director: Ewald André Dupont, starring: Emil Jannings, Maly Delschaft, Lya de Putti, Warwick Ward, Georg John, Kurt Gerron, Georg Baselt, Enrico Rastelli. Movie studio: Universum-Film AG (UFA).
- Der Bastard – screenplay, Germany 1925. Director: Gennaro Righelli. Movie studio: Phoebus Film.
- Der Mann aus dem Jenseits – screenplay, Germany 1925. Director: Manfred Noa, starring: Paul Wegener, Hans Albers, Olga Chekhova. Movie studio: Gloria-Film GmbH.
- The Prince and the Dancer – screenplay, Germany 1926. Director: Richard Eichberg, starring: Hans Albers, Lucy Doraine, Adolphe Engers, Willy Fritsch, Fritz Kampers, Hermann Picha. Movie studio: Richard Eichberg Film.
- The Circus of Life – screenplay, Germany 1926. Director: Guido Parish (as Schamberg) and Mario Bonnard, starring: Marcella Albani, Fritz Kampers, Henry Bender, Eugen Burg, Wilhelm Dieterle, Hermann Picha. Movie studio: Greenbaum-Film GmbH.
- Winnetou (not realised) – screenplay, Germany 1926. Scheduled Director: Gennaro Righelli, scheduled star: Wilhelm Dieterle. Scheduled movie studio: Universum-Film AG (UFA).
- The Mistress – screenplay, Germany 1927. Director: Robert Wiene, starring: Harry Liedtke, Eugen Burg, Hedwig Pauly-Winterstein. Movie studio: Pan Europa-Film GmbH.
- Forbidden Love – screenplay, Germany 1927. Director: Friedrich Feher, starring: Magda Sonja, Evi Eva, Paul Otto, Fritz Kampers. Movie studio: Deitz & Comp. GmbH., National-Film AG.
- Marie's Soldier – screenplay, Germany 1927. Director: Erich Schönfelder, starring: Xenia Desni, Harry Liedtke, Grit Haid, Hilde Maroff, Margarete Kupfer, Julia Serda, Siegfried Arno, Hans Albers, Hermann Picha. Movie studio: Eichberg-Film GmbH.
- The Champion of the World (1927 film) – screenplay, Germany 1927. Director: Gennaro Righelli, starring: Xenia Desni, Olga Chekhova, Paul Graetz, Fritz Kampers. Movie studio: Greenbaum-Film GmbH.
- The Vice of Humanity – screenplay, Germany 1927. Director: Rudolf Meinert, starring: Asta Nielsen, Werner Krauss, Alfred Abel, Charles Willy Kayser, Trude Hesterberg, Ekkehard Arendt. Movie studio: International Film-AG (IFA).
- Mata Hari – screenplay, Germany 1927. Director: Friedrich Feher, starring: Magda Sonja, Wolfgang Zilzer, Fritz Kortner, Mathias Wieman, Alexander Murski. Movie studio: National-Film AG.
- Das große Glück – Director, USA, probably 1929, starring: Rudolph Schildkraut, Louise Dresser, Fritz Feld. Movie studio: De Mille Pictures Corp., A William K. Howard Production. A recorded German-dialogue version of the silent American movie A Ship Comes In (1928), it is not clear from available materials if this was a dubbed version or a remake of the silent original.
- Love and the Devil – story, USA 1929. Director: Alexander Korda, starring: Milton Sills, María Corda, Ben Bard. Movie studio: First National Pictures.
- The Bargain in the Kremlin (not realised) – screenplay, USA 1929. Scheduled Director: Paul Leni, scheduled star: Joseph Schildkraut.
- Black Eagles (not realised) – screenplay, USA 1929. Scheduled director: Lothar Mendes, scheduled stars: Fay Wray, Gary Cooper, William Powell.
- Queen Kelly – one version of screenplay, USA 1929. Realised after another screenplay.
- Olympia – screenplay, USA 1930. Director: Jacques Feyder, starring: Nora Gregor, Theo Shall, Julia Serda, Karl Etlinger, Arnold Korff. Movie studio: Metro-Goldwyn-Mayer. The German version of the movie His Glorious Night by Lionel Barrymore (1929).
- Murders in the Rue Morgue – one version of screenplay, USA 1931. Realised after another screenplay.
- Mata Hari – screenplay, USA 1931. Director: George Fitzmaurice, starring: Greta Garbo, Ramón Novarro, Lionel Barrymore, Lewis Stone, Karen Morley. Movie studio: Metro-Goldwyn-Mayer, Loew's Inc., George Fitzmaurice Production Distribution Co.
- Cheaters at Play – contributing to screenplay, USA 1932. Director: Hamilton MacFadden. Movie studio: Fox Film Corporation.
- The Song of Songs – screenplay, USA 1933. Director: Rouben Mamoulian, starring: Marlene Dietrich, Brian Aherne, Lionel Atwill, Alison Skipworth, Hardie Albright. Movie studio: Paramount Pictures Inc., Rouben Mamoulian Production Distribution Co.
- Stamboul Quest – story and contributing to screenplay, USA 1934. Director: Sam Wood, starring: Myrna Loy, George Brent, Lionel Atwill, C. Henry Gordon, Mischa Auer. Movie studio: Loew's Inc., A Sam Wood Production Distribution Co.
- Flirtation (aka Mating Time) – Director and probably screenplay, USA 1934. Starring: Jeanette Loff, Ben Alexander, Emma Dunn, Franklin Pangborn, William Pawley. Movie studio: Salient Pictures Corp.
- Nana – contributing to story, USA 1934. Director: Dorothy Arzner, starring: Anna Sten. Movie studio: Samuel Goldwyn Company, United Artists Corp.
- Tornado (not realised) – story, USA 1935. Scheduled screenwriter: Reginald Berkeley, scheduled film producer: Erich Pommer.
- The Gay Desperado – story, USA 1936. Director: Rouben Mamoulian, starring: Nino Martini, Ida Lupino, Leo Carrillo, Harold Huber, Stanley Fields, Mischa Auer. Movie studio: Pickford-Lasky Productions Inc., Rouben Mamoulian Production Distribution Co., United Artists Corp.
- Mademoiselle Docteur – screenplay, France 1936. Director: Georg Wilhelm Pabst, starring: Dita Parlo, Pierre Blanchar, Pierre Fresnay, Roger Karl, Viviane Romance, Jean-Louis Barrault, Gaston Modot. Movie studio: Film Trocadéro. The French remake of the movie Stamboul Quest.
- I Gave My Wife to the King (not realised) – story, USA 1936. Banned by MPPDA according to Hays Code. Movie should concern about the affair of former king Edward VIII and Wallis Simpson.
- Full Confession – story, USA 1939. Director: John Farrow, starring: Victor McLaglen, Sally Eilers, Joseph Calleia, Barry Fitzgerald, Elisabeth Risdon. Movie studio: RKO Radio Pictures Inc.
- Whitechapel (not realised) – screenplay, USA 1939. Scheduled star: Robert Montgomery. Scheduled movie studio: Metro-Goldwyn-Mayer.
- Palace of Thousand Lies (not realised) – story, USA 1942. Scheduled star: Claudette Colbert. Scheduled movie studio: Paramount Pictures Inc. The story was used for the following movie.
- The Lady Has Plans – story, USA 1942. Director: Sidney Lanfield, starring: Paulette Goddard, Ray Milland, Roland Young, Albert Dekker, Margaret Hayes, Cecil Kellaway, Genia Nikolaieva. Movie studio: Paramount Pictures Inc.
