= The Mistress of the Governor =

1927 film

- A poster advertising the film as part of a double bill with Mary Stuart.
- Directed by: Friedrich Feher
- Written by: Friedrich Feher; Fritz Kortner
- Produced by: Frederic Brunn
- Starring: Magda Sonja; Fritz Kortner; Otto Wallburg
- Cinematography: Karl Hasselmann
- Music by: Felix Bartsch
- Production company: National Film
- Distributed by: National Film
- Release date: 16 December 1927
- Running time: 127 minutes
- Country: Germany
- Languages: Silent; German intertitles

The Mistress of the Governor (German: Die Geliebte des Gouverneurs) is a 1927 German silent historical drama film directed by Friedrich Feher and starring Magda Sonja, Fritz Kortner and Otto Wallburg. It was shot at the Staaken Studios in Berlin. The film's set designer was Max Knaake.

The film is based on the life and assassination of the Serbian queen Draga Mašin. However, under the political pressure to avoid offending the sensibilities of Yugoslavia, the film was considerably reworked and the final version was set in an undefined counry, with only vague references to the actual historical events. In particular, the protagonists committed double suicide rather than having been assassinated, and the initial title Die Geliebte auf dem Königsthron (The Mistress on the King's Throne) was changed to the current one.

== Cast ==
- Magda Sonja as The lady-in-waiting / Chambermaid
- Fritz Kortner as Tsarevich Alexander / Governor's Son
- Otto Wallburg as Tsar
- Alexander Murski as Prime Minister
- Robert Garrison as Variety owner
- Aribert Wäscher
- Eberhard Leithoff as Member of Parliament of the Farmers' Party (Abgeordneter der Bauernpartei)
- Hedwig Wangel as tsarina / Gouverneurs wife
- Wolfgang Zilzer as Hussar officer
- Werner Pittschau as Adjutant of Tsarevich / Adjutant of the son
- Heinrich Witte as Adjutants Sekretär
- Paul Rehkopf
- Esther Korten as Variétébesitzers Sekretärin
- Julius Brandt as Court physician
- Elza Temary as Abgeordneters Frau

== Bibliography ==
- Bock, Hans-Michael & Bergfelder, Tim. The Concise CineGraph. Encyclopedia of German Cinema. Berghahn Books, 2009.
