= Haunted People =

1932 film

- Directed by: Friedrich Feher
- Written by: Alfred Machard (novel)
- Starring: Magda Sonja; Hans Feher; Eugen Klöpfer
- Cinematography: Ewald Daub
- Edited by: Marie Bourová; Josef Zora
- Production company: Emco Film
- Distributed by: Deutsche Lichtspiel-Syndikat
- Release date: 6 December 1932
- Running time: 94 minutes
- Countries: Germany; Czechoslovakia
- Language: German

Haunted People (German: Gehetzte Menschen) is a 1932 German-Czech drama film directed by Friedrich Feher and starring Magda Sonja, Hans Feher, and Eugen Klöpfer. It was shot at the Staaken Studios in Berlin and on location in Marseille. The film's sets were designed by the art directors Robert Neppach and Erwin Scharf.

== Cast ==
- Magda Sonja as Dame ohne Unterleib
- Eugen Klöpfer as Vincenz Olivier
- Hans Feher as Boubou, sein Sohn
- Friedrich Ettel as Bürgermeister
- Emilia Unda as seine Frau
- Camilla Spira as Louise, beider Tochter
- Vladimir Sokoloff as Trödler
- Hugo Fischer-Köppe as Ausrufer
- Fritz Odemar as Polizeichef
- Hermann Picha as Mann in der Pferdehaut
- Gustav Püttjer as André, Tischlergehilfe
- Paul Rehkopf as Polizeikommissar
- Joseph Schmidt
- Ferdinand Hart

== Bibliography ==
- Goble, Alan (1999). The Complete Index to Literary Sources in Film. Walter de Gruyter. ISBN 978-3-11-095194-3.
