= Waxworks (1924 film) =

1924 film by Paul Leni, Leo Birinski

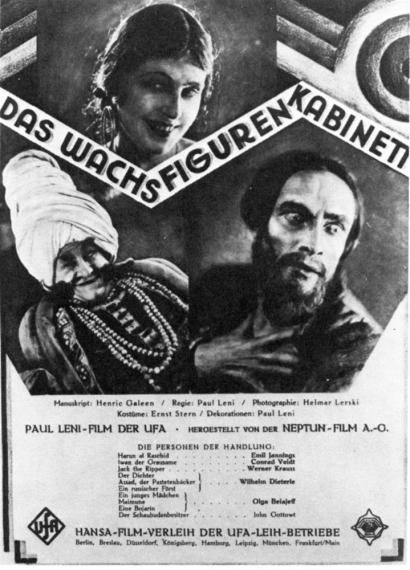
- Directed by: Paul Leni; Leo Birinski
- Screenplay by: Henrik Galeen
- Starring: Emil Jannings; Conrad Veidt; Werner Krauß; Wilhelm Dieterle
- Cinematography: Helmar Lerski
- Production company: Neptun-Film AG
- Distributed by: UFA
- Release dates: 6 October 1924 (Austria); 13 November 1924 (Berlin)
- Running time: 82 minutes
- Country: Germany

Waxworks (German: Das Wachsfigurenkabinett) is a 1924 German silent anthology film directed by Paul Leni. Its stories are linked by a plot thread about a writer (William Dieterle) who accepts a job from a waxworks proprietor to write a series of stories about the exhibits of Caliph of Baghdad (Emil Jannings), Ivan the Terrible (Conrad Veidt) and Jack the Ripper (Werner Krauss) in order to boost business.

== Plot ==
Waxworks (1924) by Paul Leni.

A young nameless poet enters a wax museum where the proprietor works in the company of his daughter Eva. The proprietor hires the poet to write a backstory for his wax models of Harun al-Rashid, Ivan the Terrible, and Jack the Ripper in order to draw an audience to the museum. With his daughter by his side, the poet notices that the arm of Harun al-Rashid is missing and writes a story incorporating the missing arm.

=== Harun al-Rashid ===
The poet sees himself in his story as a pie baker, Assad, where he lives with his wife Maimune directly by the walls of the palace where Harun Al-Rashid lives. Smoke from Assad's bakery covers the front of the palace, where Al-Rashid loses a game of chess, leading him to want the head of the baker. He sends his Grand Vizier to find the man, Assad, but in doing so, he finds Assad's wife with whom he is enchanted. After being captivated by her beauty and also captivating her with his status among the royals, he returns to tell Al-Rashid that he does not have the baker's head but rather something better – news about the baker's wife. Al-Rashid then resolves to go out that night, incognito, and visit the beauty. When he steals away from his castle, the ruler witnesses an argument between the jealous Assad and Maimune, who both seem dissatisfied with their poverty-laden life. Assad then says he will rob Al-Rashid's wishing ring to solve their problems.

While Al-Rashid visits the bakery that night, Assad slips into the palace to steal the wishing ring from the finger of Al-Rashid by slicing his arm off (later it is revealed to be only a wax figurine). He is spotted by the palace guards and is chased to the rooftops where he escapes. Meanwhile, unbeknownst to him, the real Al-Rashid is in Assad's house trying to impress his wife. The returning Assad penetrates the locked house by force, while Maimune hides Al-Rashid in the baking-oven. The guards rush in to arrest Assad for the attack at the palace, but Assad's wife uses the wishing ring to wish that Al-Rashid spring forth unharmed, as he secretly comes out of the oven. She then wishes that Assad be named the official baker for Al-Rashid. Her wish is granted and the couple come under the caliph's protection. (40 minutes)

=== Ivan the Terrible ===
The second episode, treated in a slower and more somber vein, deals with the Czar of Russia, Ivan the Terrible, whom the poet describes as making 'cities into cemeteries'. The czar takes physical delight in watching his victims die, after poisoning them. Ivan's "Poison-Mixer" writes the name of the victim on an hour glass, and once they are poisoned, the glass is turned over, the man dying just as the last sand falls. The Poison-Mixer, who has taken pity on one of the victims, is singled out by Ivan as the next to be poisoned. But, unseen, the Poison-Mixer writes "ZAR IWAN" on the next hourglass. Ivan is supposed to attend the wedding of a nobleman's son; paranoid that he is being targeted, dresses the nobleman as himself, and drives the sleigh to the wedding. There, the nobleman is killed with an arrow, and his daughter (Eva) and her bridegroom (the poet) are in shock as Ivan takes over their festivities, eventually absconding with her and holding the groom in his torture chamber. On the wedding night, Ivan hears that he has been poisoned, and races to the torture chamber to reverse his fate by turning the hour-glass over; he does it again and again, and the final title says that Ivan 'became mad and turned the glass over and over til the end of his days.' (37 minutes)

=== Jack the Ripper ===
After the poet finishes the last two stories, he wakes up to find that the wax model of Jack the Ripper has come to life (the character’s name was changed to that of Victorian urban-legend character Spring-heeled Jack in British prints to pass the British Board of Film Censors, who felt referring to and depicting a real mass murderer was offensive). Jack stalks both the poet and the waxworks owner's daughter. The Poet and the girl flee but find that they can't escape Jack through the dark, twisted halls of the museum. As Jack draws close enough, multiple versions of him appear, and as his knife begins to slash, it provokes the poet to wake up to realize that the last experience was a dream. (6 minutes)

== Cast ==
- Emil Jannings as Harun al-Rashid: Jannings plays the role of the pot-bellied Caliph Harun al-Rashid in the Arabian Nights tale.
- Conrad Veidt as Ivan the Terrible: Veidt plays the role of the Russian czar Ivan the Terrible.
- Werner Krauss as Jack the Ripper / Spring-Heeled Jack: Krauss plays the role of both killer figures in the film, referred to twice by different names.
- William Dieterle as The Poet / Assad the Baker / A Russian noble (Boyar): Dieterle plays various roles in the film as the poet: his character writes himself into each of his own stories.
- John Gottowt as the waxworks proprietor
- Olga Belajeff as Eva / Maimune / Boyar bride
- Georg John
- Ernst Legal

== Production ==
Waxworks was shot between June and September 1923. It was initially going to include a fourth story of Rinaldo Rinaldini based on the character from Christian August Vulpius' novel. The character was to be played by William Dieterle and he would be portrayed as the hero of the story. These sequences were set to be shot on location in Italy in 1923.

== Style ==
General consensus of Waxworks is that it was primarily a prototype of the horror film. Joel Westerdale discussed this The German Quarterly, Westerdale wrote that despite the bleak synopsis, the film had substantial comedic material such as the Baghdad themed film which was the longest in running time compared to the more grim Ivan the Terrible and Jack the Ripper sequences. Westerdale concluded that the film predominantly attempts to provoke laughter over fear. Contemporary reviews noted the humorous elements in the film as well, with one critic noting its different stories gave the film a Bric-à-brac feeling.

== Release ==
Waxworks was shown in Austria on October 6, 1924. It premiered in Berlin on November 13, 1924, at the U.T. Kurfurstendamm. At the screening, the film was structured differently, starting with the Ivan the Terrible sequence, followed by the Jack the Ripper sequence which was an interlude before the Harun al Rashid sequence.

The version seen in issues circulated today follows Galeen's original script which Leni had organized the film by a month after the German premiere.

== Preservation and home video status ==
English language print from the National Film Library.

The film survives only in 35mm export prints.

Kino International released Waxworks on DVD in 2002. This edition has been mastered from a restoration print produced by the Cineteca di Bologna, with restoration lab work by L’Immagine Retrovata. English language intertitles from a 1924 British print have been inserted for this edition. (These give the name of the baker's wife as Zarah. The other characters played by Belajeff are not named.) The film runs 83 minutes and is accompanied by a piano score composed and performed by Jon C. Mirsalis.

A 2019 restoration undertaken by the Deutsche Kinemathek, Fondazione Cineteca di Bologna and L’Immagine Ritrovata was released on Blu-ray in November 2020.

== Live score ==
In 2013, vocalist Mike Patton and three percussionists: Matthias Bossi, Scott Amendola, and William Winant, performed a live score for the silent film, the performance of which was filmed.

== See also ==
- List of films made in Weimar Germany

== Works cited ==
- "Das Wachsfigurenkabinett". Filmportal.de.
- Lohmeyer, Walter Gottfried (14 November 1924). "Das Wachsfiguren-Kabinett (U.T. Kurfurstendamm)". Film-Kurier.
- Westerdale, Joel (2012). "The Lighter Side of Early Weimar Cinema's Dark Canon: Paul Leni's Das Wachsfigurenkabinett". The German Quarterly. 85 (1). doi:10.1111/j.1756-1183.2012.00134.x.
