= Mata Hari (1927 film) =

1927 film by Friedrich Feher

- American release poster
- Directed by: Friedrich Feher
- Written by: Leo Birinsky
- Starring: Magda Sonja; Wolfgang Zilzer; Fritz Kortner
- Cinematography: Leopold Kutzleb
- Music by: Willy Schmidt-Gentner
- Production company: National Film
- Distributed by: National Film
- Release date: 2 May 1927
- Running time: 80 minutes
- Country: Germany
- Languages: Silent; German intertitles

Mata Hari: The Red Dancer (German: Mata Hari, die rote Tänzerin), often shortened on release to Mata Hari, is a 1927 German silent drama film directed by Friedrich Feher and starring Magda Sonja, Wolfgang Zilzer and Fritz Kortner. It depicts the life and death of the German World War I spy Mata Hari. It was the first feature-length portrayal of Hari. It was shot at the Staaken Studios in Berlin with sets designed by the art director Alfred Junge.

== Synopsis ==
Before the First World War the Dutch dancer Mata Hari is the lover of a Russian Grand Duke, but throws him over for a young peasant named Grigori. He has Grirgori arrested and then uses his prisoner as a bargaining chip to blackmail Mata Hari into becoming a spy. Started on her now famous course, she is eventually captured and sentenced to death for espionage.

== Cast ==
- Magda Sonja as Mata Hari
- Wolfgang Zilzer as Erzherzog Oskar
- Fritz Kortner as Graf Bobrykin
- Mathias Wieman as Grigori
- Emil Lind as Defense lawyer
- Eduard Rothauser as Military Auditor
- Max Maximilian as Kosaken Unteroffizier
- Leo Connard as Polizeihofrat
- Elisabeth Bach as Mata Hari's Indische Dienerin
- Dorothea Albu as Dancer
- Alexander Murski
- Hermann Wlach
- Lewis Brody
- Eberhard Leithoff
- Georg Paeschke
- Zlatan Kasherov
- Carl Zickner
- Nico Turoff
- Georg Gartz

== See also ==
- Mata Hari (1931)
- Mata Hari, Agent H21 (1964)
- Mata Hari (1985)

== Bibliography ==
- Kelly, Andrew. Cinema and the Great War. Routledge, 1997.
