= The Other I (film) =

- Directed by: Fritz Freisler
- Written by: Ladislaus Tuszynski
- Produced by: Alexander Kolowrat; Arnold Pressburger
- Starring: Raoul Aslan; Fritz Kortner; Magda Sonja
- Production company: Sascha-Film
- Release date: 6 September 1918
- Running time: 66 minutes
- Country: Austria-Hungary
- Languages: Silent; German intertitles

The Other I (German: Das andere Ich) is a 1918 Austrian silent fantasy film directed by Fritz Freisler and starring Raoul Aslan, Fritz Kortner and Magda Sonja.

== Cast ==
- Raoul Aslan as Fritz
- Fritz Kortner as Professor
- Magda Sonja as Therese

== Plot ==
A young Viennese woman, Magdalena Menzel, relocates to Berlin to find a job as a technical drafts person. She fumbles her interview at Wuellner-Werke so is only able to secure a night shift position in the workshop office. Later the chief engineer changes his mind and offers her a job in the drafting department, but she also keeps her job on the night shift. One day she meets Martin, an engineer and the owner's son, who has been masquerading as a regular employee in order to learn more about the company. Martin catches sight of her at night and she claims to be Lena, the twin sister of Magdalena. Now she has to play the roles of Magdalena by day and Lena at night. Martin falls in love with the Lena persona, but pledges to marry Magdalena after she seduces him. This is all against a backdrop of company security searching for fraud and possible espionage.

== Bibliography ==
- Bock, Hans-Michael & Bergfelder, Tim. The Concise CineGraph. Encyclopedia of German Cinema. Berghahn Books, 2009.
