= Flirtation (1934 film) =

1934 American drama film directed by Leo Birinsky

- Directed by: Leo Birinsky
- Written by: Wells Root; Leo Birinsky
- Produced by: Leo Birinsky
- Starring: Jeanette Loff; Ben Alexander; Arthur Tracy
- Cinematography: Paul Ivano
- Edited by: Louis Sackin
- Production company: Salient Pictures
- Release date: November 9, 1934
- Running time: 58 minutes
- Country: United States
- Language: English

Flirtation is a 1934 American drama film directed by Leo Birinsky and starring Jeanette Loff, Ben Alexander and Arthur Tracy.

== Plot ==
A young man from the country moves to the city and falls in love with a burlesque dancer.

== Cast ==
- Jeanette Loff as Nancy Poole
- Ben Alexander as Dudley
- Arthur Tracy as The Street Singer
- Emma Dunn as Mrs. Poole
- Franklin Pangborn as Veterinarian
- Helen MacKellar as Mrs. Smith
- Cissy Fitzgerald as Mrs. Nerps
- William Pawley as Gangster

== Bibliography ==
- Clifford McCarty. Film Composers in America: A Filmography, 1911-1970. Oxford University Press, 2000.
