= Enemy of Women =

1944 film by Alfred Zeisler

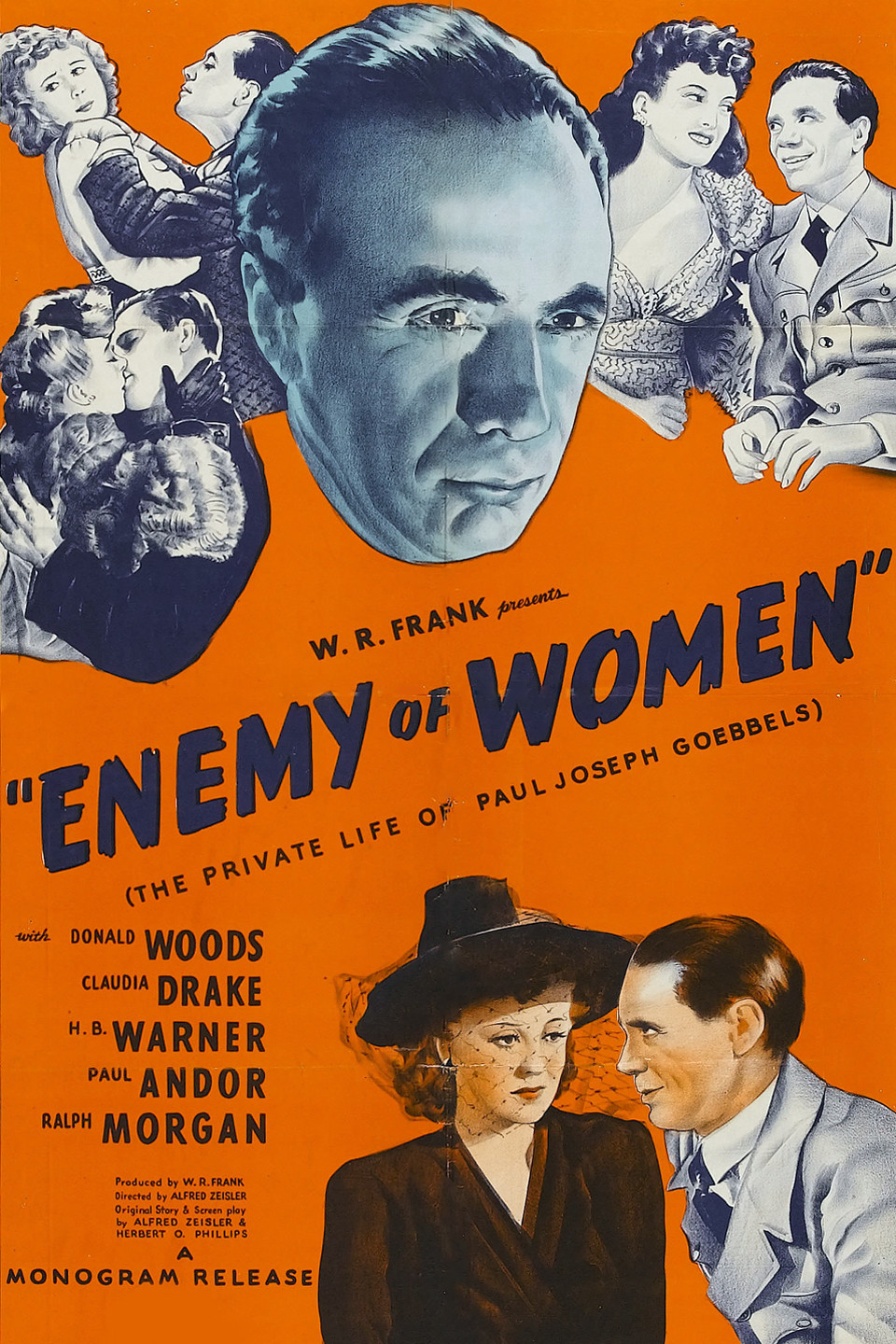
- Directed by: Alfred Zeisler
- Screenplay by: Alfred Zeisler; Herbert O. Phillips
- Produced by: W. R. Frank
- Starring: Paul Andor
- Cinematography: John Alton
- Edited by: Douglas Bagier
- Music by: Artur Guttmann
- Production company: W. R. Frank Productions
- Distributed by: Monogram Pictures
- Release date: November 10, 1944
- Running time: 85 minutes
- Country: United States
- Language: English

Enemy of Women is a 1944 American anti-Nazi propaganda film directed by Alfred Zeisler. The lead character is Joseph Goebbels, played by Paul Andor.

== Plot ==
Paul Joseph Goebbels, a down-on-his-luck playwright, boards with German military pensioner Colonel Eberhardt Brandt. While there, Goebbels falls in love with Brandt's daughter, Maria, an aspiring actress who does not return his affections. When Goebbels tries to kiss Maria, Col. Brandt kicks him out of the house, demanding Paul never return. Then Goebbels attends a rally and hears Hitler speak. This inspires him to joins the Nazis, where he achieves great success. Later, as propaganda minister, Goebbels manipulates Maria's career to her benefit, but again attempts to force her into a relationship. Maria again rejects him, and he uses his power to blacklist her.

== Cast ==
- Claudia Drake as Maria Brandt
- Paul Andor as Joseph Goebbels
- Donald Woods as Dr. Hans Traeger
- H. B. Warner as Col. Eberhardt Brandt
- Sigrid Gurie as Magda Quandt
- Ralph Morgan as Mr. Quandt
- Gloria Stuart as Bertha
- Robert Barrat as Heinrich Wallburg
- Beryl Wallace as Jenny Hartman
- Byron Foulger as Krause
- Lester Dorr as Hanussen
- Crane Whitley as Hanke
- Charles Halton as Uncle Hugo
- Marin Sais as Mrs. Bendler

== Release ==
Enemy of Women was originally released November 10, 1944. The film made $6,900 in its first 9 days.

== Reception ==
Bosley Crowther of The New York Times called it lurid and "pitifully unprofessional in virtually every way". John Sinnot of DVD Talk rated it 3/5 stars and wrote, "While Enemy of Women won't win any awards as an exemplary example of war time propaganda, it does have a certain charm to it and is very interesting to watch."

== See also ==
- List of American films of 1944
