= The Robber Symphony =

- Directed by: Friedrich Feher
- Starring: Hans Feher; Magda Sonja
- Music by: Friedrich Feher
- Color process: black and white
- Release date: April 1936
- Running time: 2h 16min
- Country: United Kingdom
- Language: English

The Robber Symphony is a 1936 British musical film directed by Friedrich Feher.

== Cast ==
- Hans Feher as Giannino
- Magda Sonja as Giannino's mother
- George Graves as Giannino's grandfather
- Michael Martin Harvey as Man with straw hat
- Webster Booth as Singer
- Jack Tracy as Bassoon Player
- Oscar Asche as Chief Gendarme
- Alexandre Rignault as Black Devil
- George André Martin as The Mayor

== Reception ==
Writing for The Spectator in 1936, Graham Greene gave the film a mixed reception. Despite characterizing the picture as "certainly the most interesting film of the last twelve months", Greene found the film to deliver a "priggish[] reprimand [with] a didactic note". Praising the story as "excellent" and dwelling on the "superb sequence of four player-pianos dragged across the Alps", Greene nevertheless complained that "in so far as [Feher's] experiment is original, it is barren."

== Trivia ==
The leading roles of Giannino and Giannino's mother were played by the director's son and wife.
