= George André Martin =

French actor

- Born: 1910
- Died: 1957 (aged 46–47)
- Other names: Georges André-Martin
- Occupation: Actor

George André Martin (1910–1957), also known as Georges André-Martin, was a French actor and variety performer. In addition to performing on stage, he also appeared in a number of films and on television shows.

== Filmography ==
- 1932: Baleydier
- 1932: L'affaire de la rue Mouffetard
- 1933: The Abbot Constantine
- 1936: The Robber Symphony (as the Mayor)
- 1954: On the Reeperbahn at Half Past Midnight

== Finger dancing act ==
Martin's signature act consisted in making his fingers take on human-like qualities and perform different kinds of dances, "[using] the forefingers of both hands to show taps, ballet, and ballroom stuff, covering his wrists with various cuffs". A reviewer from Time magazine, in 1936, described the act thus:

"M. Martin amiably drew on a pair of black gloves whose first and second fingers were missing. Over his four bare fingers he pulled two pairs of little red pants, apologizing for 'dressing in public.' Thus costumed, M. Martin's agile fingers looked like bare legs, his hands became an incredibly realistic team of tiny dancers."

There exists a short video, produced by British Pathé and entitled "Finger Dancing!", which shows him performing this act at the Trocadero Restaurant in London in 1933.
