= Mary Stuart (film) =

1927 film

- Directed by: Friedrich Feher; Leopold Jessner
- Written by: Friedrich Feher; Leopold Jessner; Anton Kuh
- Starring: Magda Sonja; Fritz Kortner; Walter Janssen
- Music by: Pasquale Perris
- Production company: National Film
- Distributed by: National Film
- Release date: December 1927
- Country: Germany
- Languages: Silent; German intertitles

Mary Stuart (German: Maria Stuart) is a 1927 German silent historical film directed by Friedrich Feher and Leopold Jessner and starring Magda Sonja, Fritz Kortner and Walter Janssen. It portrays the reign of Mary, Queen of Scots. It was shot at the Staaken Studios in Berlin. The film's sets were designed by the art director Robert A. Dietrich. It was made by the production company National Film and released in two parts.

== Cast ==
- Magda Sonja as Mary, Queen of Scots
- Fritz Kortner as Marschall Bothwell
- Walter Janssen as Lord Darnley
- Anton Pointner as Graf Leicester
- Franz Blei as John Knox
- Anton Kuh as Dr. Marias
- Arthur Kraußneck as Norfolk Vater
- Eberhard Leithoff as Norfolk Sohn
- Martin Herzberg as Der Page
- Heinrich Witte as Der erste Soldat
- Erich Dunskus as Der zweite Soldat

== Bibliography ==
- Parrill, Sue & Robison, William B. The Tudors on Film and Television. McFarland, 2013.
