= Das Haus des Dr. Gaudeamus =

1921 Austrian film

- Directed by: Friedrich Feher
- Written by: Johannes Brandt; Friedrich Feher
- Based on: Das Haus ohne Tür und Fenster by Thea von Harbou
- Starring: Friedrich Feher; Lili Breda; Carl Goetz
- Cinematography: Eugen Hamm; Josef Besci
- Production company: Vita-Film
- Release date: 5 September 1921
- Running time: Unknown
- Country: Austria
- Languages: Silent; German intertitles

Das Haus des Dr. Gaudeamus (English: The House of Dr. Gaudeamus) is a 1921 Austrian silent film, directed by and starring Friedrich Feher, and inspired by German expressionist cinema. The story is based on the 1920 novel Das Haus ohne Tür und Fenster (English: The House Without Doors and Windows) by the German author and screenwriter Thea von Harbou. It is considered to be a lost film.

== Plot ==
According to the Deutsches Filminstitut und Filmmuseum:

Hans Irrgang, an avid mountaineer, embarks on a high-altitude expedition with his fiancée shortly before their wedding. She has an accident and breaks both legs; a full recovery proves impossible. The marriage still takes place, and the young couple retreats to a peculiar refuge known as the "house without doors or windows". It was originally designed by a visionary, albeit eccentric, architect and proponent of expressionist design.

In this house of Dr. Gaudeamus, the Irrgangs' marriage gradually deteriorates to an unbearable state, as Bettina, confined to a wheelchair since breaking her legs, unintentionally makes married life a living hell for the outdoors-loving Irrgang. After some time, Bettina realises that her husband would wither away by her side and is ready to let him go. Irrgang leaves and upon his return, he finds Bettina dying. She directs him towards the architect's daughter, his former lover.

== Cast ==
- Friedrich Feher as Hans Irrgang
- Lili Breda as Bettina, his wife
- Carl Goetz as Dr. Gaudeamus
- Karl Ehmann
- Bella Muzsnay
- Rosa Gaty

== Production ==
Das Haus des Dr. Gaudeamus was filmed in Vienna in the spring of 1921 and premiered there on 5 September 1921. The German premiere of the five-act film took place on 26 January 1922.

According to the Neues Wiener Tagblatt in its edition of 9 December 1921, the film's sets were based on the expressionist decorations of Robert Wiene's 1920 masterpiece The Cabinet of Dr. Caligari, in which Feher had appeared as an actor.

== Critical reception ==
A contemporary review in the Neues Wiener Tagblatt wrote:

A film whose tendencies lean so heavily on literature, and moreover on a psychological-mystical theme, naturally cannot offer much to the general public. Even chamber dramas are not written for everyone. The muted color palette inherent in epic narratives was bound to hinder the film's popular appeal here… The prologue presents uniquely beautiful images of the high mountains. Other visual effects are also well captured artistically and photographically. The dance vision of the death of Byzantium is memorable. However, the vision of the Saviour is a misstep. It seems inorganically inserted into the film.

The film is today considered to be an early example of the fantastical thematic tendency of expressionism and a template for German expressionist cinema.

== Status ==
No surviving prints are known to be held in major film archives, and the film is considered to be lost.

== See also ==
- List of lost films
