= Alpine Tragedy =

1927 film

- Directed by: Robert Land
- Written by: Curt J. Braun
- Based on: Alpine Tragedy by Richard Voß
- Starring: Lucy Doraine; Arnold Korff; Vladimir Gajdarov
- Cinematography: Sepp Allgeier; Willy Goldberger
- Music by: Walter Ulfig
- Production company: Deutsche Film Union
- Distributed by: Deutsche First National Pictures
- Release date: 19 September 1927
- Running time: 97 minutes
- Country: Germany
- Languages: Silent; German intertitles

Alpine Tragedy (German: Alpentragödie) is a 1927 German silent drama film directed by Robert Land and starring Lucy Doraine, Arnold Korff and Vladimir Gajdarov. The film was based on the 1909 novel of the same title by Richard Voß. It was shot at the Staaken Studios in Berlin. The film's sets were designed by the art directors Andrej Andrejew and Erich Zander. It was released by the German branch of the American company First National Pictures.

== Cast ==
- Lucy Doraine as Gräfin Josette da Rimini
- Arnold Korff as Graf da Rimini
- Vladimir Gajdarov as Maler Sivo Courtien
- Hanni Hoess as Maira
- Fritz Kortner as Mairas Vater
- Wolfgang Zilzer as Fredo, Lehrer
- Eugen Neufeld as Graf Pinedo
- Dene Morel as Prinz René
- Louis Ralph as Vital, Bergführer

== Bibliography ==
- Grange, William (2008). Cultural Chronicle of the Weimar Republic. Lanham, MD: Scarecrow Press. ISBN 978-0-8108-5967-8.
