= Confessions of a Monk =

1922 film directed by Friedrich Feher

- German: Die Memoiren eines Mönchs
- Directed by: Friedrich Feher
- Written by: Friedrich Feher; Leopold Jacobson
- Based on: Das Kloster bei Sendomir by Franz Grillparzer
- Starring: Magda Sonja; Max Neufeld; Friedrich Feher
- Cinematography: József Bécsi
- Production company: Vita-Feher-Film
- Release date: 29 December 1922
- Country: Austria
- Languages: Silent; German intertitles

Confessions of a Monk (German: Die Memoiren eines Mönchs) is a 1922 Austrian silent drama film written and directed by Friedrich Feher and starring Magda Sonja, Max Neufeld and Friedrich Feher.

The film's sets were designed by the art directors Alfred Kunz and Franz Meschkan.

== Cast ==
- Magda Sonja as Elga
- Max Neufeld as Graf Starschensky
- Friedrich Feher as Oginski
- Viktor Franz as Diener
- Tini Senders
- Victor Kutschera
- Max Devrient
- Auguste Stärk-Liedermann

== See also ==
- The Monastery of Sendomir (1919)
- The Monastery of Sendomir (1920)
