= List of German films of 1919–1932 =

This is a list of the most notable films produced in Germany of the Weimar Republic era from 1919 until 1932, in year order. This period, between the end of World War I and the advent of the Nazi regime, is considered an early renaissance in world cinema, with many influential and important films being made. The style of many of these films is called German Expressionism.

For an alphabetical list of articles on Weimar German films see Category:Films of the Weimar Republic.

== 1919 ==
See List of German films of 1919

== 1920 ==
See List of German films of 1920

== 1921 ==
See List of German films of 1921

== 1922 ==
See List of German films of 1922

== 1923 ==
See List of German films of 1923

== 1924 ==
See List of German films of 1924

== 1925 ==
See List of German films of 1925

== 1926 ==
See List of German films of 1926

== 1927 ==
See List of German films of 1927

== 1928 ==
See List of German films of 1928

== 1929 ==
See List of German films of 1929

== 1930 ==
See List of German films of 1930

== 1931 ==
See List of German films of 1931

== 1932 ==
See List of German films of 1932

== See also ==
- Universum Film AG
- Cinema of Germany
- German Expressionism
- List of films set in Berlin
- List of films made in Poland in the Interwar Period
- List of films made in First Republic of Czechoslovakia
- List of Dutch Films made in the Interwar period (1919-1940)
