= Hilde Jennings =

German actress

- Born: Elisabeth Hildegard Rogge; 21 December 1906; Bad Freienwalde, Brandenburg, German Empire
- Died: Unknown, after 1955; Karakol, Soviet Union
- Occupation: Actress
- Years active: 1924–1937 (film)

Hilde Jennings (born Elisabeth Hildegard Rogge; 21 December 1906 – unknown) was a German film actress. She was married to Soviet film director Mikhail Iosifovich Dubson.

== Selected filmography ==
- The Brigantine of New York (1924)
- Oh Those Glorious Old Student Days (1925)
- Poor Little Colombine (1927)
- Ghost Train (1927)
- Tragedy of the Street (1927)
- The Woman from the Folies Bergères (1927)
- Orient Express (1927)
- The Green Alley (1928)
- The Last Performance of the Circus Wolfson (1928)
- Affair at the Grand Hotel (1929)
- Circumstantial Evidence (1929)
- The White Paradise (1929)
- Two Brothers (1929)
- Sin and Morality (1929)
- Spring Days (1934)
- The Shack of Old Louvain (1935)
- Big Wings (1937)

== Bibliography ==
- Goble, Alan. The Complete Index to Literary Sources in Film. Walter de Gruyter, 1999.
