= The Lady Has Plans =

1942 film by Sidney Lanfield

- Directed by: Sidney Lanfield
- Screenplay by: Harry Tugend
- Based on: a story by Leo Birinski
- Produced by: Fred Kohlmar
- Starring: Ray Milland; Paulette Goddard; Roland Young
- Cinematography: Charles Lang
- Edited by: William Shea
- Music by: Leigh Harline; Leo Shuken
- Production company: Paramount Pictures
- Distributed by: Paramount Pictures
- Release date: January 24, 1942 (US)
- Running time: 77 minutes
- Country: United States
- Language: English
- Box office: $1,250,000 (US rentals)

The Lady Has Plans is a 1942 American comedy spy thriller directed by Sidney Lanfield and starring Ray Milland, Paulette Goddard and Roland Young. This film was released on January 24, 1942, by Paramount Pictures as a World War II espionage film set in neutral Portugal.

== Plot ==
A gang of criminals murder a scientist, steal plans for a "radio-controlled torpedo" and have them tattooed in invisible ink on the back of a woman named Rita, planning to sell them to the highest bidder. Paul Baker then murders the tattooer. Rita is to take the place of reporter Sidney Royce (Paulette Goddard) on an airplane bound for Lisbon. Baker has informed the British and the Nazis to contact "Sidney" there for the auction. Joe Scalsi is given the task of making sure that Sidney does not board the plane, but he is taken into custody by government agents. Rita witnesses this.

Meanwhile, the real Sidney Royce is being sent to Lisbon to work for the very demanding Kenneth Harper, who has fired the last four reporters. They were all men, so Mr. Weston decides to try sending a woman instead.

== Cast ==
- Ray Milland as Kenneth Clarence Harper
- Paulette Goddard as Sidney Royce
- Roland Young as Ronald Dean
- Albert Dekker as Baron Von Kemp
- Margaret Hayes as Rita Lenox
- Cecil Kellaway as Peter Miles
- Addison Richards as Paul Baker
- Edward Norris as Frank Richards
- Charles Arnt as Pooly
- Hans Schumm as 1st German
- Hans von Morhart as 2nd German
- Genia Nikolaieva as German Maid
- Gerald Mohr as Joe Scalsi
- Lionel Royce as Guard

== Reception ==
Bosley Crowther panned the film in his New York Times review, calling it a "silly fable, without rhyme or reason" and a "thoroughly implausible tale".

== Adaptations ==
The Lady Has Plans was adapted for The Lux Radio Theatre, with William Powell and Rita Hayworth replacing Milland and Goddard in the title roles. It was aired on April 26, 1943.
