= Poor Little Colombine =

1927 film directed by Franz Seitz

- German: Arme kleine Colombine
- Directed by: Franz Seitz
- Written by: Alfred Schirokauer; Franz Seitz
- Produced by: Alfred Zeisler
- Starring: Paul Rehkopf; Hilde Jennings; Wolfgang Zilzer
- Cinematography: Karl Attenberger
- Production company: Deulig Film
- Distributed by: Deulig Film
- Release date: 7 April 1927
- Country: Germany
- Languages: Silent; German intertitles

Poor Little Colombine (German: Arme kleine Colombine) is a 1927 German silent drama film directed by Franz Seitz and starring Paul Rehkopf, Hilde Jennings and Wolfgang Zilzer. It was shot at the Johannisthal Studios in Berlin. The film's sets were designed by the art director Max Heilbronner.

== Cast ==
- Paul Rehkopf as Peter Lanner, woodcarver
- Hilde Jennings as Aennchen, his daughter
- Wolfgang Zilzer as Christoph Burger
- Walter Rilla as Ernst Honsel
- Wilhelm Diegelmann as Karl Meinert, his uncle
- Egon von Jordan as Fritz Helbig
- Charlotte Susa as Lotte Monti
- Hermann Picha as Johannes Rabe
- Valeska Stock as Frau Rabe
- Maria Forescu as Frau Tratsch, fortune teller
