= Forbidden Love (1927 film) =

1927 film

- Directed by: Friedrich Feher
- Written by: Leo Birinsky
- Starring: Magda Sonja; Evi Eva; Paul Otto
- Cinematography: Giovanni Vitrotti
- Production company: Deitz Film
- Distributed by: Deitz Film
- Release date: 24 February 1927
- Country: Germany
- Languages: Silent; German intertitles

Forbidden Love (German: Verbotene Liebe) is a 1927 German silent drama film directed by Friedrich Feher and starring Magda Sonja, Evi Eva, and Paul Otto.

The film's sets were designed by the art director Gustav A. Knauer.

== Cast ==
- Magda Sonja as Gräfin
- Evi Eva as Liesl
- Paul Otto as Herr von Bürgen
- Gerd Briese as Hans
- Gretl Dupont as Magd Kati
- Paula Eberty as Wirtin
- Fritz Kampers as Freund von Hans
- Karl Platen as Haushofmeister
- Olaf Storm as Rudolf
- Wolfgang Zilzer as Freund von Hans

== Bibliography ==
- Grange, William (2008). Cultural Chronicle of the Weimar Republic. Lanham, MD: Scarecrow Press. ISBN 978-0-8108-5967-8.
