= The Vice of Humanity =

1927 film directed by Rudolf Meinert

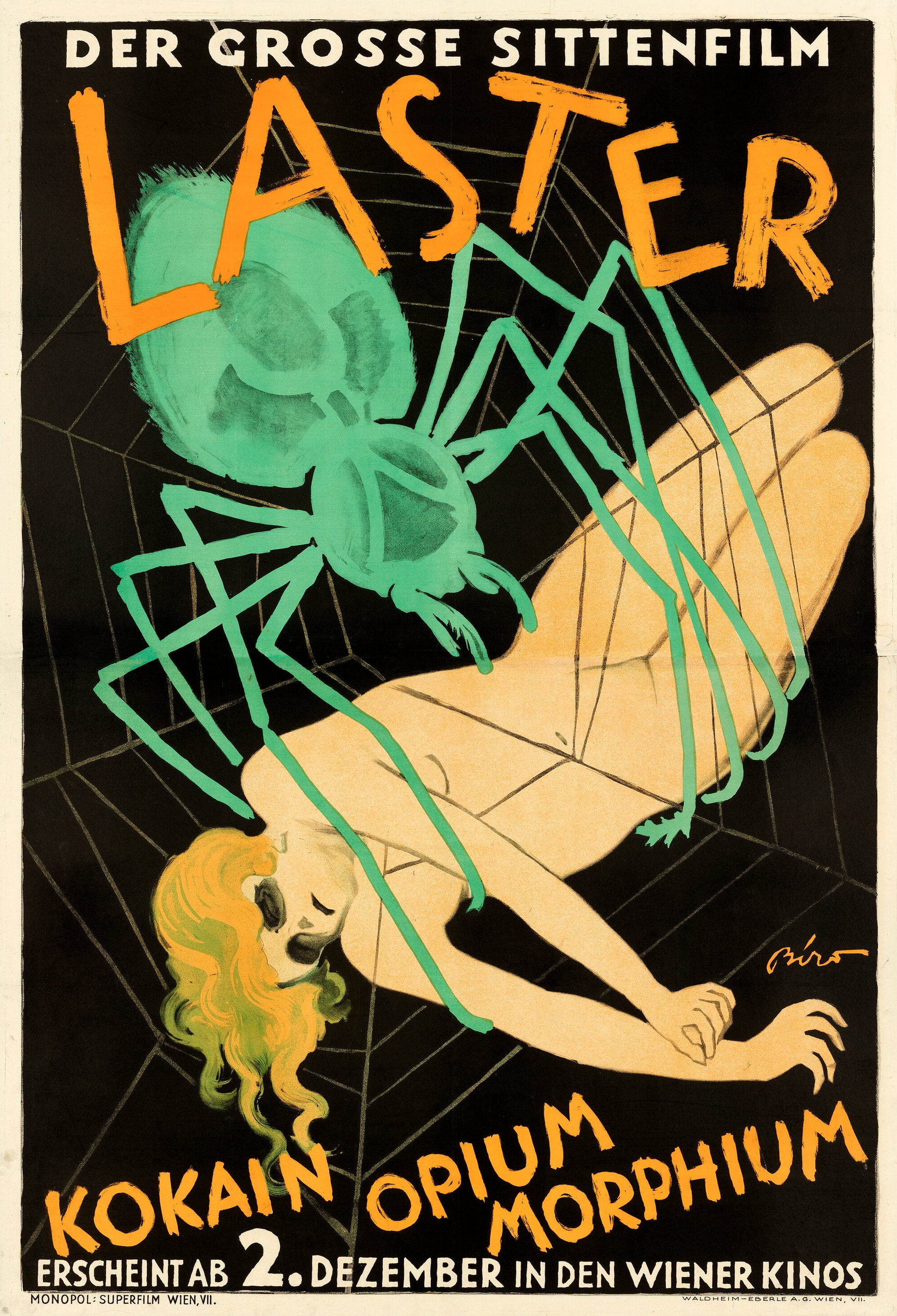
- Austrian film poster
- German: Laster der Menschheit
- Directed by: Rudolf Meinert
- Written by: Leo Birinski
- Starring: Asta Nielsen; Werner Krauss; Alfred Abel; Charles Willy Kayser
- Cinematography: Ludwig Lippert
- Music by: Willy Schmidt-Gentner
- Production company: International Film-AG
- Distributed by: International Film-AG
- Release date: 5 April 1927
- Country: Germany
- Languages: Silent; German intertitles

The Vice of Humanity (German: Laster der Menschheit) is a 1927 German silent drama film directed by Rudolf Meinert and starring Asta Nielsen, Werner Krauss and Alfred Abel. It premiered at the Marmorhaus in Berlin.

Full movie

== Plot ==
Opera singer Tamara is heavily addicted to cocaine. Her manager Mangol, who also acts as their coke supplier, goes in and out of her house and uses it as his drug transshipment point. Due to her addiction, Tamara has now lost both her husband and her daughter, who is growing up with her ex-husband. In order to spare his daughter's greater suffering, Mangol tells them both that their mother had died. When her daughter sits in the audience for one evening, she becomes a great admirer of Tamara's singing skills.

For Mangol, the young girl is nothing more than another potential customer whom he wants addicted to cocaine, but Tamara is on guard, and won't let it happen. Tamara decides to snatch her daughter from the dirty hands of the dealer and put her back in the safe hands of her ex-husband. Tamara sees no hope and commits an act of desperation. She snatches her daughter while Mangol is strangled by one of his junkie customers.

== Cast ==
- Asta Nielsen as Tamara
- Werner Krauss as cocainist
- Alfred Abel as Mangol
- Charles Willy Kayser
- Elizza La Porta
- Trude Hesterberg
- Maria Forescu
- Carla Meissner
- Sybille Lerchenfeld as Countess
- Ekkehard Arendt
- Eberhard Leithoff
