= Orient Express (1927 film) =

1927 film

- Lil Dagover in a scene from the film
- Directed by: Wilhelm Thiele
- Written by: Wilhelm Thiele
- Starring: Lil Dagover; Heinrich George; Angelo Ferrari
- Cinematography: Karl Puth
- Music by: Willy Schmidt-Gentner
- Production company: Phoebus Film
- Distributed by: Phoebus Film
- Release date: December 1927
- Country: Germany
- Languages: Silent; German intertitles

Orient Express (German: Orientexpress) is a 1927 German silent thriller film directed by Wilhelm Thiele and starring Lil Dagover, Heinrich George and Angelo Ferrari. The film's sets were designed by the art directors Hans Baluschek and Karl Machus.

== Cast ==
- Lil Dagover as Beate von Morton
- Heinrich George as Peter Karg
- Angelo Ferrari as Vicomte Antoine d'Arcier
- Walter Rilla as Allan Wilton
- Maria Paudler as Mimi
- Hilde Jennings as Lisbeth
- Uwe Jens Krafft as Brauereibesitzer Müller

== Bibliography ==
- Waldman, Harry & Slide, Anthony. Hollywood and the Foreign Touch: A Dictionary of Foreign Filmmakers and Their Films from America, 1910-1995. Scarecrow Press, 1996.
