= The Marriage Nest =

1927 film

- Advertising poster for the film
- Directed by: Rudolf Walther-Fein
- Written by: Walter Reisch
- Starring: Livio Pavanelli; Harry Liedtke; Wolfgang Zilzer
- Cinematography: Guido Seeber
- Music by: Felix Bartsch
- Production company: Aafa-Film
- Distributed by: Aafa-Film
- Release date: 2 September 1927
- Country: Germany
- Languages: Silent; German intertitles

The Marriage Nest (German: Das Heiratsnest) is a 1927 German silent film directed by Rudolf Walther-Fein and starring Livio Pavanelli, Harry Liedtke, and Wolfgang Zilzer.

The film's sets were designed by Botho Hoefer and August Rinaldi. It was made by the Berlin-based Aafa-Film.

== Cast ==
- Livio Pavanelli as Oberst v. Grodicki
- Harry Liedtke as Rittmeister von Derfling
- Wolfgang Zilzer as Leutnant Wranow
- Julia Serda as Die Generalin
- Gritta Ley as Helene, deren Tochter
- Iwa Wanja as Emmy, deren Tochter
- Margarete Lanner as Frau von Sorner
- Hans Tost as Prinz August
- Hans Junkermann as Kriegsminister Graf Henkstein
- Viktor Senger as General a.D. v. Bialkonsky
- Ida Wüst as Madame Rosa
- Sophie Pagay as Die Wirtin
- Hermann Picha as Der Bürgermeister
- Marie Grimm-Einödshofer as Die Bürgermeisterin
- Cläre Lotto as Kati, Stubenmädchen
- Hugo Fischer-Köppe as Toni, Bursche des Rittmeisters
- Max Menden as Stanislaw
- Anni Litschauer as Eine nervöse Dame

== Bibliography ==
- Grange, William (2008). Cultural Chronicle of the Weimar Republic. Lanham, MD: Scarecrow Press. ISBN 978-0-8108-5967-8.
