= Wolfgang Zilzer =

German-American stage and film actor

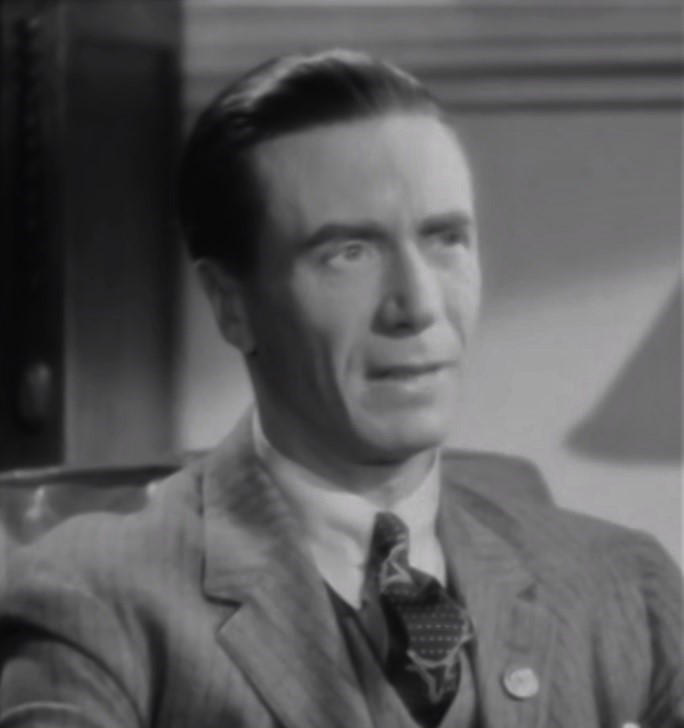
- Zilzer in Enemy of Women (1944)
- Born: January 20, 1901; Cincinnati, Ohio, U.S.
- Died: June 26, 1991 (aged 90); Berlin, Germany
- Other names: Paul Andor; John Voight, John Voigt
- Occupation: Actor
- Years active: 1915–1986
- Spouse: Lotte Palfi

Wolfgang Zilzer (January 20, 1901 – June 26, 1991) was a German-American stage and film actor, often under the stage name Paul Andor.

== Biography ==
Zilzer was born in Cincinnati, Ohio, to German-Jewish emigrant Max Zilzer, who was employed at the local theater. Zilzer's mother died soon after his birth, and his father returned to Germany in 1905.

Zilzer appeared on stage in child roles and made his first movie appearance in the age of 14. Around 1930, he moved back to the United States, but had only small success as an actor. He returned to Germany. According to a 1943 Jewish Telegraphic Agency newspaper article, he "was a featured player of UFA in the palmy days before the Furore [Hitler]", but after Adolf Hitler's rise to power, Zilzer fled to France, where he worked dubbing voices in several French versions of Hollywood productions. In 1935, Zilzer returned to Germany again, finally emigrating to the US in 1937. Applying for a visa at the U.S. embassy, he first realized he already had US citizenship. After his emigration, he started to work with Ernst Lubitsch in several anti-Nazi movies, using pseudonyms to protect his father, who was still living in Berlin. With appearances in films from 1915 to 1986, Zilzer had one of the longest careers in cinema history. The Internet Broadway Database lists a single credit for a Wolfgang Zilzer, in the 1943 play The Barber Had Two Sons.

Zilzer married the German-Jewish actress Lotte Palfi (1903–1991); both appeared in the 1942 movie Casablanca. Zilzer played the man without a passport who is shot by French policemen at the beginning of the film. After World War II, Zilzer performed on stage in the United States and in Germany. In 1944, Zilzer had a rare lead role as Joseph Goebbels in the 1944 propaganda film Enemy of Women.

Later in life he became known to a new audience as a recurring character "Henry" on Late Night with David Letterman, who Letterman would continuously fire for mundane reasons. These exchanges were almost always prefaced by Henry mentioning he was a short time away from collecting his pension.

At the end of the 1980s Zilzer contracted Parkinson's disease and decided to return to Germany. His wife refused to do so, and their marriage ended in divorce after almost 50 years, close to both their deaths.

Wolfgang Zilzer died in Berlin on June 26, 1991, aged 90 and is buried at the Waldfriedhof Zehlendorf.

== Selected filmography ==
- Der Barbier von Flimersdorf (1915)
- Professor Erichsons Rivale (1916)
- Die Spinne (1917)
- The Ancient Law (1923) – Page
- Vineta. Die versunkene Stadt (1923)
- Schützenliesel (1926) – Dr. Blasius Nestl
- Das edle Blut (1927) – Von Günsfeld
- Forbidden Love (1927) – Freund von Hans
- Poor Little Colombine (1927) – Christoph Burger
- Venus im Frack (1927)
- Mata Hari (1927) – Erzherzog Oskar
- Primanerliebe (1927) – Rolf Karsten
- The Marriage Nest (1927) – Leutnant Wranow
- Alpine Tragedy (1927) – Fredo, Lehrer
- The Awakening of Woman (1927) – Fritz Wille, Sohn
- The White Spider (1927) – Diener bei Lord Barrymore
- Schwere Jungs - leichte Mädchen (1927) – Hoppler
- Die Geliebte des Gouverneurs (1927) – Husarenoffizier
- Alraune (1928) – Wölfchen
- Thérèse Raquin (1928) – Camille Raquin
- Eve's Daughters (1928) – Baron Hans von Stetten / Jean de Stetten
- When the Mother and the Daughter (1928)
- Sir or Madam (1928)
- Lemke's Widow (1928)
- Docks of Hamburg (1928) – The nipper
- The Abduction of the Sabine Women (1928) – Balsamo, Intrigant
- Hotelgeheimnisse (1929) – Komplize des Hochstaplers
- Painted Youth (1929) – Walter
- The Right of the Unborn (1929) – Fredy
- The Woman in the Advocate's Gown (1929) – Leif Andersen
- Crucified Girl (1929)
- Tragedy of Youth (1929) – Emil
- Revolt in the Reformatory (1930) – Hans
- Karriere (1930)
- Such Is Life (1930) – Wooer
- Marriage in Name Only (1930) – Max Benken
- Retreat on the Rhine (1930) – Karl, Oskars Bursche
- Boycott (1930)- Möller, Oberprimaner
- Bookkeeper Kremke (1930)
- Wibbel the Tailor (1931) – Schneidergeselle Zimpel
- Ash Wednesday (1931) – Neufert
- Casanova wider Willen (1931)
- Raid in St. Pauli (1932) – Musiker-Leo
- Strafsache von Geldern (1932)
- Ever in My Heart (1933) – Voice of Hugo Wilbrandt (French version) (uncredited)
- Bluebeard's Eighth Wife (1938) – Book Salesman (uncredited)
- Crime Ring (1938) – Hans, the Forger (uncredited)
- I'll Give a Million (1938) – Citizen (uncredited)
- Hotel Imperial (1939) – Limping Tenor (uncredited)
- Confessions of a Nazi Spy (1939) – Westphal (as John Voigt)
- Espionage Agent (1939) – Heinrich (uncredited)
- Ninotchka (1939) – Taxi Driver (uncredited)
- Hitler - Beast of Berlin (1939) – Kleswing (as John Voight)
- Television Spy (1939) – Frome
- Everything Happens at Night (1939) – Thief at Dock (uncredited)
- Dr. Ehrlich's Magic Bullet (1940) – Kellner (uncredited)
- Four Sons (1940) – Peasant (uncredited)
- Three Faces West (1940) – Dr. Rudolf Preussner (uncredited)
- A Dispatch from Reuter's (1940) – Post Office Clerk (uncredited)
- Escape (1940) – Pavilion Counter Clerk (uncredited)
- So Ends Our Night (1941) – Vogt (uncredited)
- Forbidden Passage (1941 short) – Otto Kestler
- Out of Darkness (1941 short) – Leon Rochelle – Second Editor of La Libre Belgique (uncredited)
- Shining Victory (1941) – Subordinate (uncredited)
- Underground (1941) – Hoffman
- World Premiere (1941) – Bushmaster's Aide (uncredited)
- All Through the Night (1941) – Frascher (uncredited)
- The Lady Has Plans (1942) – German Clerk – Baron's Office (uncredited)
- To Be or Not to Be (1942) – Man in Bookstore (uncredited)
- Joan of Ozark (1942) – Kurt
- Invisible Agent (1942) – Von Porten (uncredited)
- Berlin Correspondent (1942) – Patient (uncredited)
- The Devil with Hitler (1942 short) – Otto Schultz (uncredited)
- Casablanca (1942) – Man with Expired Papers (uncredited)
- Margin for Error (1943) – Bit Part (uncredited)
- They Got Me Covered (1943) – Cross (uncredited)
- Assignment in Brittany (1943) – Captain Deichgraber's Aide (uncredited)
- They Came to Blow Up America (1943) – Schlegel
- Hitler's Madman (1943) – SS Colonel (uncredited)
- Appointment in Berlin (1943) – Cripple (uncredited)
- Bomber's Moon (1943) – Nazi Doctor Treating Jeff
- Behind the Rising Sun (1943) – Max (uncredited)
- The Strange Death of Adolf Hitler (1943) – Attorney
- Paris After Dark (1943) – German Announcer (uncredited)
- In Our Time (1944) – Father Józef (uncredited)
- They Live in Fear (1944) – Old Man (uncredited)
- Enemy of Women (1944) – Dr. Paul Joseph Goebbels (as Paul Andor)
- Hotel Berlin (1945) – Walter Baumler (uncredited)
- Counter-Attack (1945) – Krafft (as Paul Andor)
- Week-End at the Waldorf (1945) – Waiter (uncredited)
- Stairway to Light (1945 short) – Dr. Philippe Pinel (uncredited)
- Carnegie Hall (1947) – Waiter (uncredited)
- Women in the Night (1948) – German Doctor (as Paul Ander)
- Walk East on Beacon! (1952) – August Helmuth (as Paul Andor)
- Singing in the Dark (1956) – Refugee (as Paul Andor)
- Terror After Midnight (1962) – Vater Reynolds
- No Survivors, Please (1964)
- Mister Buddwing (1966) – Man on the Street (uncredited)
- The Diary of Anne Frank (1967, TV film)
- Union City (1980) – Ludendorff (as Paul Andor)
- Lovesick (1983) – Analyst (as Paul Andor)
- FDR: A One Man Show (1986 TV film) – Understudy
- The Passenger – Welcome to Germany (1988) – Levi (final film role)

== Partial television credits ==
- Claudia: The Story of a Marriage (1952 TV series)
- The United States Steel Hour (1957 TV episode "The Bottle Imp")
- Late Night with David Letterman (1983–85) (recurring role, as Paul Andor or "Old Henry")

== Bibliography ==
- John Holmstrom, The Moving Picture Boy: An International Encyclopaedia from 1895 to 1995, Norwich, Michael Russell, 1996, p. 17.
