= Anton Kuh =

Austrian-Jewish journalist and essayist

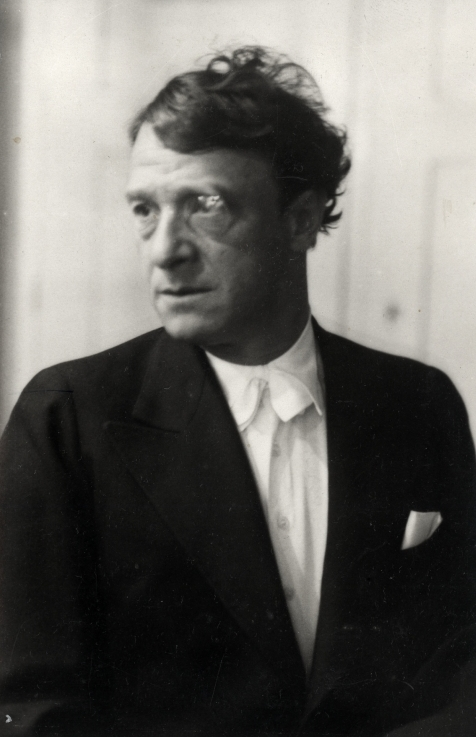
Anton Kuh (1890–1941), Austrian journalist and essayist.

Anton Kuh (12 July 1890 in Vienna – 18 January 1941 in New York City) was an Austrian-Jewish journalist and essayist.

== Works ==
- Juden und Deutsche, Erich Reiss, Berlin 1921

== Selected filmography ==
- Never Trust a Woman (1930)
- The Land of Smiles (1930)

== See also ==
- List of Austrian writers
