= Magda Sonja =

Austrian-American actress (1886–1974)

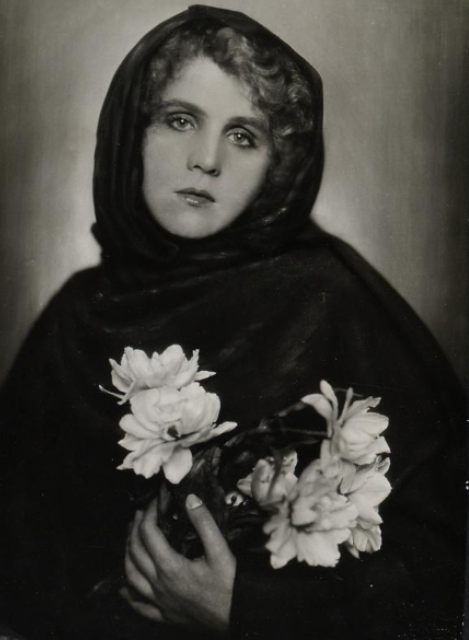
- Magda Sonja by Madame d'Ora, 1925
- Born: Věnceslava Johana Veselá; 23 May 1886; Hradištko, Austria-Hungary (present-day Czech Republic)
- Died: 20 August 1974 (aged 88); Los Angeles, California, U.S.
- Resting place: Hollywood Forever Cemetery
- Other name: Magda Slawa
- Occupation: Actress
- Years active: 1907–1936
- Spouse: Friedrich Feher
- Children: Hans Feher

Magda Sonja (born Věnceslava Johana Veselá; 23 May 1886 – 20 August 1974) was an Austrian-American actress. She appeared in 42 films between 1917 and 1936, although she is perhaps best known for her portrayal of Mata Hari in Mata Hari: The Red Dancer (1927). Prior to becoming an actress, she was a cabaret performer and chansonnière. She is considered to be one of Austria's first movie stars, only paralleled by Liane Haid.

== Biography ==
Věnceslava Johana Veselá was born on 23 May 1886 to Czech parents. She was affectionately called "Slava" by her family. She trained in music and dance, and took on the pseudonym Magda Slawa, which would eventually derive into Magda Sonja. In 1907, she was a choir singer at the Theater an der Wien, and appeared in classical and modern roles at the Vienna City Theater, where she met her husband, Friedrich Feher. She also worked as a diseuse in various Viennese cabarets.

Magda Sonja made her screen debut in The Waning Heart (1917). That same year, she signed to Sascha-Film, the leading film company in Austria at the time. There, she appeared in films such as Um ein Weib (1917), in which she played as a vamp, The Other I (1918), and Don Juan's Last Adventure (1918), amongst others. In the 1920s, she began to advance into leading roles, and rose to prominence after starring in Queen Draga (1920) as the title role; she would later reprise her role as Draga in the 1927 film Draga Maschin.

Beginning in 1922, she exclusively starred in films directed by her husband, such as Ssanin (1924), which was an adaptation of the novel by Mikhail Artsybashev. At the peak of her career, she portrayed Mata Hari in Mata Hari: The Red Dancer (1927). She next acted as Mary, Queen of Scots in Mary Stuart, followed by The Mistress of the Governor (both 1927), and Hotel of Secrets (1929).

In 1930, Sonja made her talkie debut in the Czechoslovak drama Když struny lkají, which is considered to be the first Czechoslovak film fully made with synchronized sound. The film also marked the screen debut of Sonja and Feher's son, Hans Feher. Unable to make the transition to sound, Sonja's career declined and she only appeared in three more films, her final screen appearance being in the British musical The Robber Symphony (1936).

Sonja, her son, and her husband, who was Jewish, evaded the Nazis by fleeing to Britain in 1933. The family permanently moved to the U.S. in July 1937, settling in Los Angeles, where Sonja died on 20 August 1974. She was interred at Hollywood Forever Cemetery.

== Selected filmography ==
- The Other I (1918)
- Queen Draga
- The Venus (1922)
- Confessions of a Monk (1922)
- Ssanin (1924)
- Mary Stuart (1927)
- Forbidden Love (1927)
- Mata Hari (1927)
- Die Geliebte des Gouverneurs (1927)
- The Red Dance (1928)
- Hotel of Secrets (1929)
- Když struny lkají (1930)
- Haunted People (1932)
- The Robber Symphony (1936)

== Bibliography ==
- Brinson, Charmian & Dove, Richard Dove & Taylor, Jennifer. Immortal Austria?: Austrians in Exile in Britain. Rodopi, 2007. ISBN 978-94-012-0403-3
- Kreimeier, Klaus (1999). The Ufa story: a history of Germany's greatest film company, 1918-1945. University of California Press. ISBN 9780520220690.
