= Friedrich Feher =

Austrian actor and director (1889–1950)

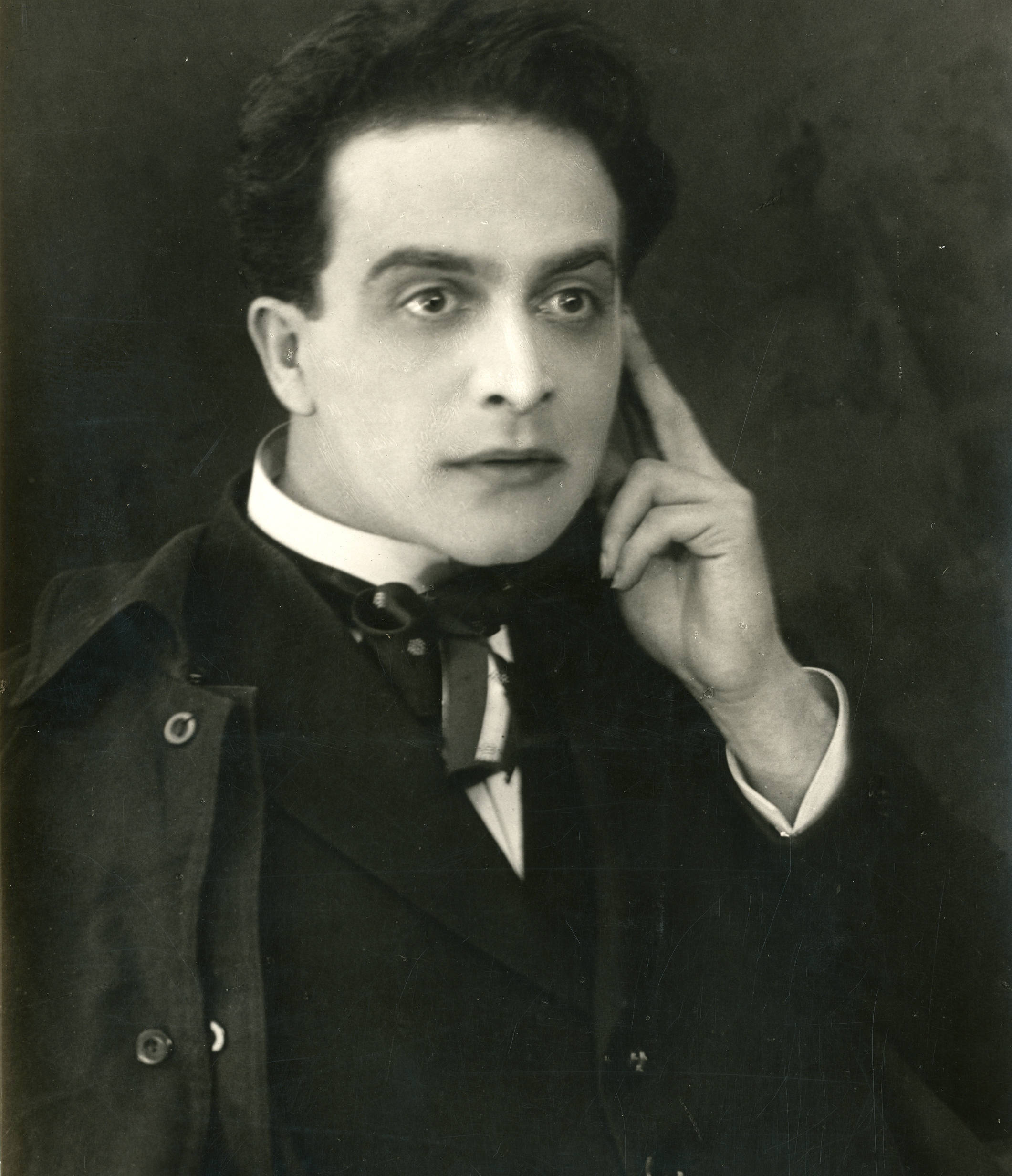
- Feher in 1920
- Born: Friedrich Weiß; 16 March 1889; Vienna, Austria-Hungary
- Died: 30 September 1950 (aged 61); Stuttgart, West Germany
- Other names: Friedrich Fehér
- Occupations: Actor, director
- Years active: 1913–1950
- Spouse: Magda Sonja
- Children: Hans Feher

Friedrich Feher (born Friedrich Weiß, 16 March 1889 – 30 September 1950. Sometimes spelled with an accent as Friedrich Fehér) was an Austrian actor and film director. He first entered the film business in 1913, starting out as an actor but quickly gravitating toward directing.

He is perhaps best remembered as Francis, the protagonist of The Cabinet of Dr. Caligari (1920). He directed Das Haus des Dr. Gaudeamus (English: The House Without Windows) the following year, based on a book by Thea von Harbou, in which his art directors mimicked the Expressionist set designs of Dr. Caligari; it is now considered a lost film.

Feher died in 1950 in Stuttgart at age 61.

== Selected filmography ==
Actor

- Kabale und Liebe (1913)
- Emilia Galotti (1913) - Odoardo
- Die Räuber (1913) - Karl Moor
- Die Ehe der jungen Felicitas (1913)
- Stürme (1913)
- Die Befreiung der Schweiz und die Sage vom Wilhelm Tell (1913) - Hermann Gessler
- Theodor Körner (1914) - Theodor Körner
- Alexandra (1915) - Graf Erwin
- The Robber Bride (1916, Short)
- Lebenswogen (1917)
- Das neue Leben (1918)
- Bergblumen (1919) - Kunstler Daniel Thom Suhn
- Pro domo, das Geheimnis einer Nacht (1919)
- Der unsichtbare Gast (1919)
- Wie das Schicksal spielt (1920) - Erwin Freiburg
- The Cabinet of Dr. Caligari (1920) - Francis
- The Three Dances of Mary Wilford (1920)
- Die tote Stunde (1920)
- Tyrannei des Todes (1920) - Toter
- Die sieben Gesichter (1920)
- Marionetten des Teufels (1920)
- Die rote Hexe (1921)
- Das Haus des Dr. Gaudeamus (1921)
- Die Geburt des Antichrist (1922)
- Die Memoiren eines Mönchs (1922) - Oginski
- The Tales of Hoffmann (1923)
- Der Rosenkavalier (1926) - Valzacchi
- Ihr Junge (1931) - Michowski
- Jive Junction (1943) - Frederick Feher (final film role)

Director

- Diamonds (1920)
- Das Haus des Dr. Gaudeamus (1921)
- Confessions of a Monk (1922)
- Ssanin (1924)
- Forbidden Love (1927)
- Mary Stuart (1927)
- That Murder in Berlin (1929)
- Když struny lkají (1930)
- Haunted People (1932)
- The Robber Symphony (1936)

== Bibliography ==
- Jung, Uli & Schatzberg, Walter. Beyond Caligari: The Films of Robert Wiene. Berghahn Books, 1999.
