= Staaken Studios =

Historic film studios in Berlin

- Company type: Film studio
- Industry: Film
- Defunct: After 1934
- Headquarters: Staaken, Berlin, Germany

Staaken Studios was a film studio located in Staaken on the outskirts of the German capital Berlin. A large former zeppelin hangar, it was converted to film use following the First World War and operated during the Weimar Republic. In July 1923 it was the largest studio in the world, with floor space of around 18,000 square feet. It was used for the construction of massive sets on a series of major productions of the silent era, including I.N.R.I., Metropolis, The Holy Mountain and The Ship of Lost Souls. These epics were a part of the German attempt on world markets during the decade. The 1927 Anglo-German co-production The Ghost Train was shot at Staaken.

In 1929, following the Wall Street crash, the studio's owners collapsed financially and Staaken was acquired by the Deutsche Lichtspiel-Syndikat. It was equipped for sound film, but it increasingly struggled to attract new productions. Amongst the films shot during the early 1930s were The Threepenny Opera and Ariane. After 1934 it was no longer available as a film studio.

== See also ==
- Tempelhof Studios

== Bibliography ==
- Bergfelder, Tim & Cargnelli, Christian. Destination London: German-speaking emigrés and British cinema, 1925–1950. Berghahn Books, 2008.
- Kreimeier, Klaus. The Ufa Story: A History of Germany's Greatest Film Company, 1918–1945.University of California Press, 1999.
