= List of films set in Vienna =

This is a list of films set in Vienna. While they have traditionally featured "opulent interiors and romantic exteriors", some New Wave films have subverted this image by selecting obscure locations or modern urban spaces.

Due to Vienna's rich musical heritage, many of the movies set there are about music or have a strong musical element in the storyline.

== List of films ==
- 360 (film)
- 1914 (film)
- Almost Angels
- Amadeus (film)
- The Angel with the Trumpet (1948 film)
- The Angel with the Trumpet (1950 film)
- Angeli senza paradiso
- Anni (film)
- Anton the Last
- Anuschka (film)
- Bad Timing
- Beauty and the Boss
- Beethoven Lives Upstairs
- Beethoven's Great Love
- Before Dawn (film)
- Before Sunrise
- Beloved Augustin (1940 film)
- The Best Offer
- Beware of Pity
- Bitter Sweet (1933 film)
- Bitter Sweet (1940 film)
- Blind Man's Bluff (1936 film)
- Blossom Time (1934 film)
- The Bohemian Dancer (1926 film)
- Bride of the Wind
- Burgtheater (film)
- Calling Philo Vance
- Canaris (film)
- Captain America: Civil War
- Carry On Spying
- Castles in the Air (1939 film)
- Champagne Waltz
- The Chocolate Soldier (film)
- The City Without Jews
- The Climax
- Come to Vienna, I'll Show You Something!
- Congress Dances
- The Congress Dances (1955 film)
- Conquest (1937 film)
- Dancing Vienna
- The Dancing Years (film)
- A Dangerous Method
- They Dare Not Love
- Downstairs (film)
- Dreams Come True (1936 film)
- Emperor Charles (film)
- The Emperor Waltz (1953 film)
- The Emperor Waltz
- Escapade (1935 film)
- Eternal Melodies
- Evenings for Sale
- Exit... nur keine Panik
- Falstaff in Vienna
- The Fate of the House of Habsburg
- Fearless (1978 film)
- The Firebird (1934 film)
- Die Fledermaus (1923 film)
- Die Fledermaus (1946 film)
- Die Fledermaus (1962 film)
- Die Fledermaus (1979 film)
- The Florentine Dagger
- Florian (film)
- Foreign Intrigue (film)
- Forget Mozart
- Four in a Jeep
- Franz Schubert (film)
- Fräulein Else (1929 film)
- Freud: The Secret Passion
- Gently My Songs Entreat
- Goodbye, Mr. Chips (1939 film)
- Goodnight, Vienna
- Grand Duchess Alexandra
- The Great Awakening (film)
- The Great Waltz (1938 film)
- The Greater Glory
- The Guardsman
- Hauptmann Florian von der Mühle
- Heart's Desire (1935 film)
- Her Sister from Paris
- The Higher Command
- Hitler: The Rise of Evil
- The House of Rothschild
- The House of Three Girls (1918 film)
- The House of Three Girls (1958 film)
- I, Don Giovanni
- The Illusionist (2006 film)
- Immortal Waltz
- Invisible Adversaries
- The Iron Duke
- It's Only Love (film)
- Jeannie (film)
- Jewel Robbery
- Johann Mouse
- Joyless Street
- Killer's Carnival
- The King Steps Out
- Kings Row
- The Kiss Before the Mirror
- Klimt (film)
- Kolberg (film)
- Der Kongreß tanzt
- Last Stop (film)
- The Last Waltz King
- Letter from an Unknown Woman (1948 film)
- The Lie of Nina Petrovna
- The Living Daylights
- The Long Shadow (1961 film)
- Love Me and the World Is Mine
- A Love Story (1933 film)
- Malina (film)
- The Man with Two Brains
- Maria Ilona
- Maria Theresa (film)
- Marie Antoinette (1938 film)
- The Marriage Circle
- Maskerade (film)
- Mayerling (1968 film)
- Mayerling (1936 film)
- Mayerling (1957 film)
- Melba (film)
- The Melody Man
- The Merry Wives of Vienna
- Merry-Go-Round (1923 film)
- Mesmer (film)
- Miracle of the White Stallions
- Mission: Impossible – Rogue Nation
- The Mistress (1927 film)
- Money on the Street
- Mozart (1955 film)
- The Murderer with the Silk Scarf
- Museum Hours
- My Daughter Lives in Vienna
- The Mysterious Lady
- Napoleon (1955 film)
- The Night Is Young
- The Night Porter
- The Odessa File (film)
- Once Upon a Honeymoon
- Oh... Rosalinda!!
- One Does Not Play with Love
- Operetta (film)
- The Piano Teacher (film)
- Poor as a Church Mouse
- Die Pratermizzi
- Premiere (1937 film)
- The Red Danube
- Reunion in Vienna
- Das Riesenrad
- La Ronde (1950 film)
- Rush (2013 film)
- Salome, Where She Danced
- Sarajevo (1940 French film)
- School for Love
- Schrammeln
- Schubert's Dream of Spring
- Scorpio (film)
- Le Secret de Mayerling
- The Secret Diary of Sigmund Freud
- Sehnsucht 202
- Sensational Janine
- Serenade (1927 film)
- Serenade (1940 film)
- The Seven-Per-Cent Solution (film)
- Shots in Threequarter Time
- Silva (film)
- The Singing City
- Sisi (miniseries)
- Sissi (film)
- Sissi – The Young Empress
- Sissi – Fateful Years of an Empress
- The Smiling Lieutenant
- So Ends Our Night
- A Song for You (film)
- The Song You Gave Me
- Spring Parade (1934 film)
- Spring Parade
- Stolen Identity (film)
- The Strange Vice of Mrs. Wardh
- Strauss Is Playing Today
- Such Great Foolishness
- Sunshine Susie
- Swelling Melodies
- Tales from the Vienna Woods
- Tales of Old Vienna
- The Third Man
- To Skin a Spy
- To the Bitter End
- The Tobacconist
- Tragedy in the House of Habsburg
- Ultimatum (1938 film)
- Und Jimmy ging zum Regenbogen
- Vienna 1910
- Vienna Blood (film)
- Vienna Tales
- Vienna, City of My Dreams (1957 film)
- Vienna, City of Song
- Vienna, City of Song (1923 film)
- Vienna, How it Cries and Laughs
- Viennese Girls
- Viennese Nights
- V13 (film)
- The Virtuous Sinner
- Voices of Spring (1933 film)
- A Waltz by Strauss
- A Waltz by Strauss (1925 film)
- A Waltz Dream (film)
- The Waltz King (film)
- Waltz Time (1933 film)
- Waltz Time (1945 film)
- Waltz War
- Waltzes from Vienna
- Watermarks (film)
- We Belong to the Imperial-Royal Infantry Regiment
- The Wedding March (1928 film)
- When Nietzsche Wept
- Whom the Gods Love (1936 film)
- Woman In Gold
- A Woman of Experience

== See also ==
- Lists of Austrian films
- List of films set in Rome
