= The Waltz King (disambiguation) =

The Waltz King is a nickname for Johann Strauss II (1825–1899), an Austrian composer.

The Waltz King may also refer to:

== People ==
- Clyde Moody (1915–1989), American singer-songwriter, dubbed the "Hillbilly Waltz King"
- Jose Estella (1870–1943), Filipino composer and conductor, dubbed the "Philippine Waltz King"
- Wayne King (1901–1985), American songwriter and bandleader

== Arts and entertainment ==
- The Waltz King (film), 1930 film
- Strauss: The Waltz King, 1928 film
- The Waltz King, 1963 film on The Magical World of Disney

== See also ==
- The Last Waltz King, 1922 film
