= Queen Draga (film) =

1920 film

- German: Königin Draga
- Directed by: Hans Otto
- Starring: Magda Sonja; Karl Leiter; Hans Homma
- Cinematography: Eduard Hoesch
- Production company: Allianz-Film
- Distributed by: Allianz-Film
- Release date: 1920
- Country: Austria
- Languages: Silent; German intertitles

Queen Draga (German: Königin Draga) is a 1920 Austrian silent film directed by Hans Otto and starring Magda Sonja, Karl Leiter and Hans Homma. It portrays Draga Mašin, the wife of Alexander I of Serbia, who was killed together with her husband in the May Coup of 1903.

== Cast ==
- Magda Sonja as Queen Draga
- Karl Leiter as King Alexander
- Hans Homma as Colonel Machin
- Louis Nerz as King Milan
- Maria West
- Emmy Schleinitz
- Anita Muthsam
- Paul Askonas
- Herr Weißhapel
- Heinz Altringen
- Herr Berndt
