= The Guardsman (1925 film) =

1925 film directed by Robert Wiene

- Directed by: Robert Wiene
- Written by: Ferenc Molnár (play); Ludwig Nerz; Robert Wiene
- Starring: Alfred Abel; María Corda; Anton Edthofer
- Cinematography: Hans Androschin
- Production company: Pan Film
- Distributed by: Phoebus Film (Germany)
- Release date: 24 October 1925
- Country: Austria
- Languages: Silent; German intertitles

The Guardsman (German: Der Gardeoffizier) is a 1925 Austrian silent comedy film directed by Robert Wiene and starring Alfred Abel, María Corda and Anton Edthofer. The film was shot at the Schönbrunn Studios in Vienna. It was based on the play Testőr by Ferenc Molnár and in 1931 remade as a movie by Sidney Franklin.

== Synopsis ==
An actor, jealous of his wife's suspected infidelity, disguises himself as an officer of the royal guard and begins courting her to try to catch her out.

== Cast ==
- Alfred Abel as Schauspieler
- María Corda as Schauspielerin
- Anton Edthofer as Kritiker
- Karl Forest as Garderobier
- Alice Hetsey as Mama
- Biela Friedell
- Alma Hasta

== Bibliography ==
- Jung, Uli & Schatzberg, Walter. Beyond Caligari: The Films of Robert Wiene. Berghahn Books, 1999.
