= The Dancer from Tanagra =

1920 film

- Directed by: Heinz Paul
- Written by: Hans Brennert
- Starring: Fritz Alten; Hella Moja; Josef Reithofer
- Cinematography: Hans Karl Gottschalk
- Production company: Terra Film
- Release date: 1920
- Country: Germany
- Language: German

The Dancer from Tanagra (German: Die Tänzerin von Tanagra) is a 1920 German silent film directed by Heinz Paul and starring Fritz Alten, Hella Moja and Josef Reithofer.

== Cast ==
- Fritz Alten as Bildhauer Avardos
- Hella Moja as Mündel Praxedis
- Josef Reithofer as Piero Bacistini
- Richard Georg
- Henri Peters-Arnolds
