= Reinhold Häussermann =

Austrian actor

- Born: 10 February 1884; Stuttgart, German Empire
- Died: 4 April 1947 (aged 63); Vienna, Austria
- Occupations: Film actor Stage actor
- Years active: 1902 – 1940

Reinhold Häussermann (10 February 1884 – 4 April 1947) was a German-born Austrian stage and film actor. Haussermann appeared in twenty-one films during his career, largely in supporting roles in films such as Karl Leiter's The Missing Wife (1929). He was the father of the actor and director Ernst Haeussermann. His daughter in law was the actress Susi Nicoletti.

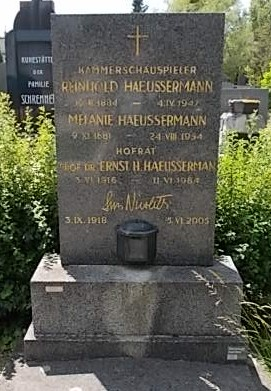
Reinhold Häussermann's grave at Döbling Cemetery

== Selected filmography ==
- The Moon of Israel (1924)
- The Curse (1924)
- Ssanin (1924)
- The Third Squadron (1926)
- The Missing Wife (1929)
- The Prince of Arcadia (1932)
- A Star Fell from Heaven (1934)
- The Emperor's Candlesticks (1936)
- Confetti (1936)
- Konzert in Tirol (1938)
- A Mother's Love (1939)
- Anton the Last (1939)
- I Am Sebastian Ott (1939)
- Der Postmeister (1940)

== Bibliography ==
- Youngkin, Stephen. The Lost One: A Life of Peter Lorre. University Press of Kentucky, 2005.
