= A Waltz by Strauss =

A Waltz by Strauss may refer to:

- A Waltz by Strauss (1931 film), a German historical musical film
- A Waltz by Strauss (1925 film), an Austrian silent film
