= Carmen Cartellieri =

Austrian actress

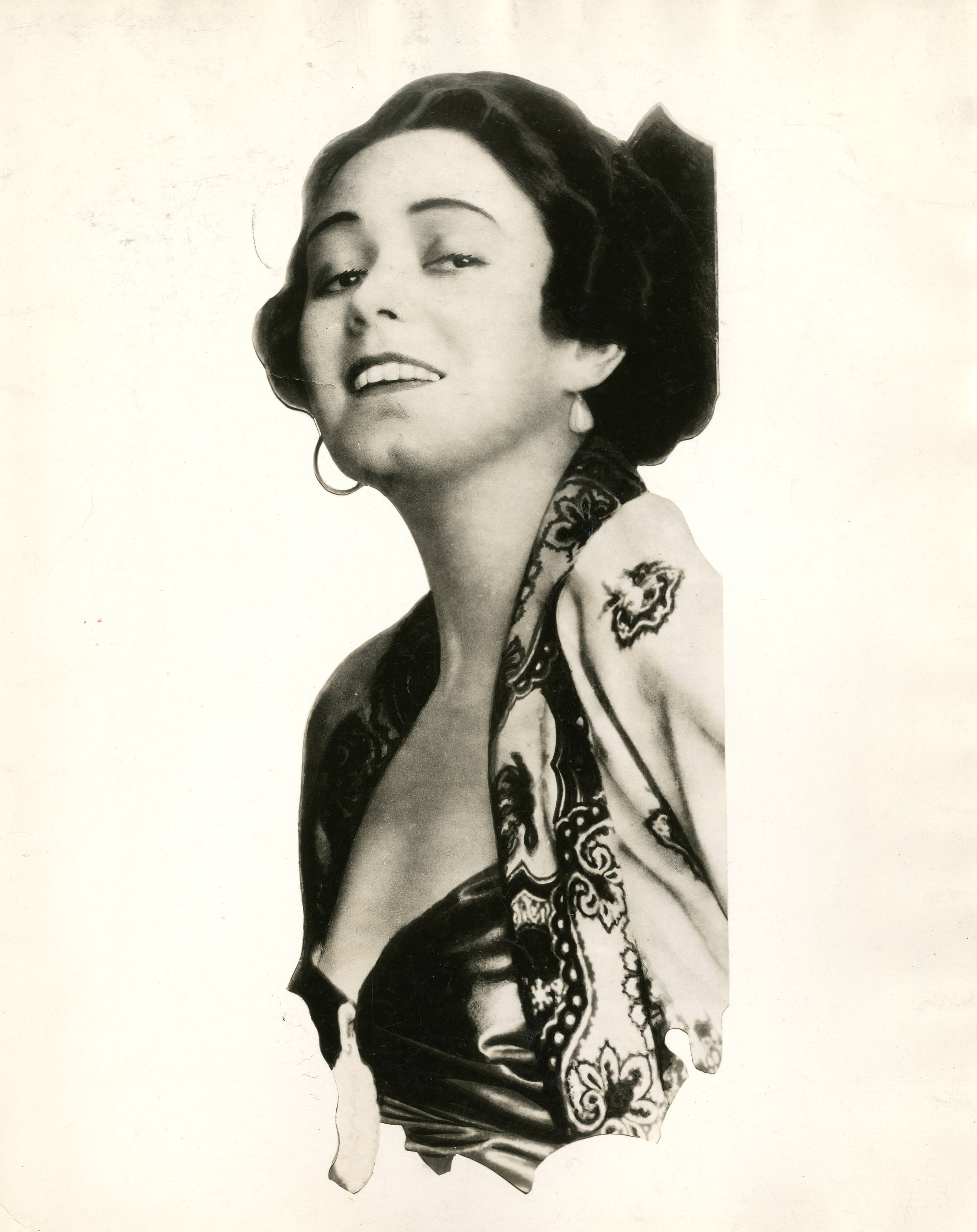
- Carmen Cartellieri, photographed by Dora Kallmus, 1919
- Born: Franziska Ottilia Cartellieri; 28 June 1891; Proßnitz, Austria-Hungary (present-day Prostějov, Czech Republic)
- Died: 17 October 1953 (aged 62); Vienna, Austria
- Other name: Carmen Teschen
- Occupations: Actress, producer
- Years active: 1918–1928
- Spouse: Mano Ziffer-Teschenbruk (m. 1907)
- Children: 1

Carmen Cartellieri (born Franziska Ottilia Cartellieri, 28 June 1891 – 17 October 1953), also known as Carmen Teschen, was an Austrian actress and producer.

== Early life ==
Carmen Cartellieri was born on 28 June 1891, as Franziska Ottilia Cartellieri. She was born in Proßnitz, Austria-Hungary (now Prostějov, Czech Republic), but spent most of her childhood in Innsbruck, Austria. Her father was an engineer. When she was 16, she married Emanuel Ziffer Edler von Teschenbruck, known as Mano Ziffer-Teschenbruk. Teschenbruck was an aristocrat who was originally an artist who later became a director. They had one child together, Ruth (born 1910).

== Career ==
Cartellieri's early career was developed with help from her husband, Teschenbruck, and Cornelius Hintner, a Tyrolean director in Hungary who used to be a cameraman for Pathé. Cartellieri featured in various Hungarian silent films throughout 1918 to 1919. Her stage name was Carmen Teschen. She acted in her first Austrian film, The Gypsy Girl (1919), directed by Hinter. Supposedly, she cowrote the film. She also starred in Hinter's film, The Strangling Hand/The Hand of the Devil, in 1920. Political situations after the war in Hungary forced her to move from Budapest to Vienna. Carmen was able to become a big star, acting in German-language films during the 1920s.

In 1920, Carmen founded the Cartellieri-Film company with Teschenbruck and Hinter. She also used her surname to suggest she was from Italy. The first production of her company was a comedy directed by Teschenbruck called Carmen Learns to Ski (1920). The Viennese public liked her a lot and chose her as 'the most beautiful actress of Vienna'. The second production of the company was The Strangling Hand/The Hand of the Devil (1920), directed by Hinter. This film was critically praised for the effectiveness of its narrative and Carmen's performance.

Carmen continued to act in the company's films including The White Death (1921), The Tragedy in the Dolomites (1921), Creature from the Starworld (1922), The Yellow Danger (1922), and The Sin of Inge Lars (1922).

Creature from the Starworld (1922) was directed by Teschenbruk with Carmen, and was the first full-feature length silent film dealing with outer space not adapted from writings by Jules Verne. Carmen also produced Hinter's Die Sportlady (1922), which gave her the "vamp" image. Carmen often preferred to work with Tilde Fogl and Rita Barré, female screen writers, during her acting and producing career.

Carmen won many beauty and fashion prizes from 1921 to 1923 and became more famous than other female film stars such as Liane Haid and Magda Sonja. She starred in Wilhelm Thiele's Fiat Lux (1923), Robert Wiene's The Hands of Orlac (1924), and Hans Homma’s Die Puppe des Maharadscha/The Doll of the Maharajah (1924).

Her decline as a lead actress began after Robert Wiene's Austrian silent epic, The Cavalier of the Rose (1926). Once the silent era ended, Carmen was not able to move her career into sound. Her last appearance was in The Fate of the Habsburgs (1928).

=== Theater ===
Cartellieri also worked in the theater during the 1920s. She often appeared at the Ronacher theater in Vienna, but she was also seen in the 1926 Pantomime Der Todesring (The Ring of Death).

== Partial filmography ==
- A sors ökle (1918) - Hella
- Kettös álarc alatt (1918) - Wilson detektíva detektív nõvére
- A cigányleány (1919) - A cigányleány
- Az összeesküvök (1919) - Santini énekesnõ
- A bosszú (1919) - Mirjam, Uziel lánya
- Teherán gyöngye (1919)
- Marion Delorme (1919)
- Az elrabolt szerencse (1920) - Éva / Mária
- Büßer der Leidenschaft (1920)
- Die Würghand (1920) - Rose
- Die Liebe vom Zigeuner stammt... (1920)
- Der weiße Tod (1921) - Carmen Riccardi
- The Dead Wedding Guest (1922) - Donna Clara
- Die Sünde der Inge Lars (1922)
- Die Frauen des Harry Bricourt (1922)
- Parema - Das Wesen aus der Sternenwelt (1922)
- Die Menschen nennen es Liebe... (1922)
- Die gelbe Gefahr (1922)
- Die Sportlady (1922)
- Töte sie! (1922)
- Fiat Lux (1923) - Tochter des Ingenieurs
- Eines Vaters Söhne (1923)
- Das Geheimnis der Schrift (1924)
- Die Tragödie einer Frau (1924)
- The Hands of Orlac (1924) - Regine
- Die Puppe des Maharadscha (1924)
- Was ist Liebe...? (1924)
- Boarding House Groonen (1925)
- Frauen aus der Wiener Vorstadt (1925)
- Der Rosenkavalier (1925) - Annina
- Der Balletterzherzog. Ein Wiener Spiel von Tanz und Liebe (1926) - Madame Spalanzoni - the Prima Ballerina
- The Family without Morals (1927) - Sophie
- Infantrist Wamperls dreijähriges Pech (1927)
- Todessturz im Zirkus Cesarelli (1927)
- Madame Dares an Escapade (1927)
- Die Strecke (1927) - Anna - die Kassierin in der 'Traube'
- Die Ehe einer Nacht (1927) - Dina Elkström
- The Man with the Limp (1928) - Madame Pique
- Ein Wiener Musikantenmädel (1928)
- The Gambling Den of Montmartre (1928) - Die Zimmervermieterin
- The Fate of the House of Habsburg (1928) - Countess Larisch
- The Midnight Waltz (1929) - (final film role)

== Bibliography ==
- Jung, Uli & Schatzberg, Walter. Beyond Caligari: The Films of Robert Wiene. Berghahn Books, 1999.
