= The Street of Forgetting =

1926 film

- Directed by: Heinz Paul
- Written by: F. Ladewig; Hella Moja
- Starring: Hella Moja; Henry Stuart; Ida Wüst
- Cinematography: Friedl Behn-Grund
- Music by: Alexander Schirmann
- Production company: Pantomim-Film
- Distributed by: Pantomim-Film
- Release date: 19 December 1926
- Country: Germany
- Languages: Silent; German intertitles

The Street of Forgetting (German:Die Straße des Vergessens) is a 1926 German silent film directed by Heinz Paul and starring Hella Moja, Henry Stuart and Ida Wüst.

The film's sets were designed by the art directors Botho Hoefer and Bernhard Schwidewski.

== Cast ==
- Hella Moja as Viola de Revera
- Henry Stuart as Juan Alvaro, Kapitän der spanischen Armee
- Ida Wüst as Marquise de Revera
- Olga Engl as ihre Gouvernante
- Paul Otto as José Mendoza, Großindustrielle
- Ferdinand von Alten as sein Freund, Fernando Cordova
- Antonio Lopez as Bursche des Kapitäns
- Fritz Ruß as Diener im Hause Revera
- Heinz Büthe as Soldat

== Bibliography ==
- Jill Nelmes & Jule Selbo. Women Screenwriters: An International Guide. Palgrave Macmillan, 2015.
