= Emperor Charles =

Emperor Charles or Emperor Karl may refer to:

- Charlemagne (742–814), first Holy Roman Emperor
- Charles the Bald (823–877), counted as Emperor Charles II
- Charles the Fat (839–888), counted as Emperor Charles III
- Charles IV, Holy Roman Emperor (1316–1378)
- Charles V, Holy Roman Emperor (1500–1558)
- Charles VI, Holy Roman Emperor (1685–1740)
- Charles VII, Holy Roman Emperor (1697–1745)
- Charles I of Austria (1887–1922), Emperor of Austria, King of Hungary and Bohemia
- Charles of Valois, titular Emperor of Constantinople
- Emperor Charles (film), a 1921 Austrian silent film
