= Der Rosenkavalier (disambiguation) =

Der Rosenkavalier is an opera by Richard Strauss.

Der Rosenkavalier may also refer to:

- Der Rosenkavalier (1926 film), an Austrian film adaptation directed by Robert Wiene
- Der Rosenkavalier (1962 film), a British film adaptation directed by Paul Czinner
