= White Paradise =

White Paradise may refer to:

- White Paradise (1924 film), a 1924 Czechoslovak film
- The White Paradise, a 1929 Austrian silent film
- White Paradise (2022 film), a 2022 French film
