= The Monte Cristo of Prague =

1929 film

- Directed by: Hans Otto
- Written by: Hans Otto; Václav Wasserman
- Produced by: Oskar Glück
- Starring: Albert Heine; Valerie Boothby; Walter Rilla
- Cinematography: Viktor Gluck; Josef Strecha
- Production companies: Bratri Deglové; Projektograph Film
- Distributed by: Südfilm (Germany)
- Release date: 1929
- Countries: Austria; Czechoslovakia
- Languages: Silent; German intertitles

The Monte Cristo of Prague (German: Der Monte Christo von Prag) is a 1929 Austrian-Czech silent adventure film directed by Hans Otto and starring Albert Heine, Valerie Boothby and Walter Rilla.

== Cast ==
- Albert Heine as John Orel
- Valerie Boothby as Mary
- Walter Rilla as Fred Born
- Jan W. Speerger as Egon Bernhard
- Clementine Plessner as Fred's Mother
- Iris Arlan as Elly Hubert
- Josef Rovenský as George Richell
- Theodor Pistek as Prison Guard
- Hans Homma as Examining Judge
- Hans Effenberger

== Bibliography ==
- Hans-Michael Bock and Tim Bergfelder. The Concise Cinegraph: An Encyclopedia of German Cinema. Berghahn Books, 2009.
