= Hans Ziegler =

Hans Ziegler may refer to:

- Hans K. Ziegler (1911–1999), solar cell/satellite engineer
- Hans Severus Ziegler (1893–1978), Nazi official
- Hans Ziegler (physicist) (1910–1985), Swiss physicist
- Hans Ziegler (actor) (1879–1961), German-born Austrian stage director and stage actor
- Hans Ziegler (politician) (1887–1957), mayor of Nuremberg
