= The Hell of Barballo =

1923 film directed by Hans Homma

- Directed by: Hans Homma
- Written by: Paul Frank (play); Louis Nerz
- Starring: Grit Haid; Hilde Schulz; Albert von Kersten
- Cinematography: Viktor Gluck; Ludwig Schaschek
- Production company: Pan-Film
- Release date: 23 February 1923
- Country: Austria
- Languages: Silent; German intertitles

The Hell of Barballo (German: Die Hölle von Barballo) is a 1923 Austrian silent drama film directed by Hans Homma and starring Grit Haid, Hilde Schulz and Albert von Kersten.

== Cast ==
- Grit Haid
- Hilde Schulz
- Pauline Schweighofer
- Albert von Kersten
- Peer Andersen
- Louis Nerz
- Viktor Franz
- Marek Martoff
- Alexander Polonsky

== Bibliography ==
- Paolo Caneppele & Günter Krenn. Elektrische Schatten. Filmarchiv Austria, 1999.
- Ryan Shand, Small-Gauge Storytelling: Discovering the Amateur Fiction Film: Discovering the Amateur Fiction Film. Edinburgh University Press, 2013.
