= Father Radetzky =

1929 film

- Directed by: Karl Leiter
- Written by: Franz Pollak
- Starring: Karl Forest; Otto Hartmann; Theodor Pištěk
- Cinematography: Max Nekut
- Production company: Sascha-Film
- Release date: 13 September 1929
- Country: Austria
- Languages: Silent; German intertitles

Father Radetzky (German: Vater Radetzky) is a 1929 Austrian war film directed by Karl Leiter and starring Karl Forest, Otto Hartmann and Theodor Pištěk. It is a biopic of the nineteenth century Austrian soldier Joseph Radetzky von Radetz. It was made by Sascha-Film in Vienna and was released on 13 September 1929. The film's sets were designed by the art director Emil Stepanek.

== Cast ==
- Karl Forest as Feldmarschall Radetzky
- Otto Hartmann as Lorenz Hauser
- Theodor Pištěk as Leonhard Planinger
- Iris Arlan as Annerl, seine Tochter
- Ágnes Esterházy as Itala Fassotti
- Joseph Sneyden as Mario Gallone
- Vilma Astay as Metternich
- Grete Natzler
- Annie Rosar

== Bibliography ==
- Holmes, Deborah & Silverman, Lisa. Interwar Vienna: culture between tradition and modernity. Camden House, 2009.
