= V13 (film) =

2025 film directed by Richard Ledes

- Release poster
- Directed by: Richard Ledes
- Written by: Richard Ledes; Alain-Didier Weill
- Produced by: Richard Ledes; Daniel Sollinger
- Starring: Alan Cumming; Liam Aiken; Samuel H. Levine
- Cinematography: Antonio Rossi
- Edited by: Richard Ledes
- Music by: Silent Strike
- Production companies: Footnote Four; Vienna 1913 Productions
- Distributed by: Deskpop Entertainment
- Release date: April 4, 2025 (Vimeo)
- Running time: 103 minutes
- Country: United States
- Language: English

V13 is a 2025 American historical drama film directed by Richard Ledes starring Alan Cumming, Samuel H. Levine, and Liam Aiken. Its an adaptation of Alain Didier-Weill's play Vienne 1913.

== Premise ==
The plot follows the meeting of Sigmund Freud, Adolf Hitler and pianist Hugo in Vienna on the eve of the World War I.

== Cast ==
- Alan Cumming — Freud
- Liam Aiken — Hugo
- Ross Alden — Lanz
- Carol Axel — Lydia
- Kyle Bary — Friedrich
- Ehad Berisha — Guido
- Thomas Blackburne — Matthew
- Cara Buono — Ida
- Cara Corrigan — Olga
- India Ennenga — Molly
- Ronald Guttman — Lieberman
- Andrew Keenan-Bolger — Hanisch
- Samuel H. Levine — Adolf Hitler
- Brian Mueller — Hans
- Cavan Rogers — Fritz
- Taylor Marie Scott — Elizabeth
- Aya Siberia — Gallery Assistant/Greta
- David Sitler — Park Guardian/Conductor
- Andrew Stewart-Jones — Carl Jung
- Sam Tsoutsouvas — Professor Panofski
- Max Vaupen — Wilhelm
- Robert Verlaque — Professor Kreijbach
- Michael Winther — Johann

== Release ==
It was released on Vimeo On Demand on April 4, 2025, and other VOD services on May 13, 2025.

== Reception ==
On Film Threat, Tom Atkinson scored the film an 8 out of 10 writing in his review consensus section: "beneath the intellectual thicket lies real emotional heft." On Crooked Marquee, Josh Bell rated it a "C−" describing it as "tedious" and "stilted drama".

Writing for The Forward, PJ Grisar praised Samuel H. Levine's performance as Hitler, and commenting on the film wrote that "from the first minute, Ledes’ film is overstuffed with enough ideas to bowl over Tom Stoppard."

== See also ==
- List of World War I films
- List of American films of 2025
- List of drama films of the 2020s
- List of films set in Vienna
