= The Marquise of Clermont =

1922 film directed by Hans Homma

- Directed by: Hans Homma
- Written by: Honoré de Balzac (novel); Louis Nerz
- Starring: Grit Haid; Egon Friedell; Adolf Weisse
- Cinematography: Hans Androschin
- Production company: Pan-Film
- Release date: 1 September 1922
- Country: Austria
- Languages: Silent; German intertitles

The Marquise of Clermont (German: Die Marquise von Clermont) is a 1922 Austrian silent film directed by Hans Homma and starring Grit Haid, Egon Friedell and Adolf Weisse.

== Cast ==
- Grit Haid as Germaine
- Egon Friedell as König
- Adolf Weisse as Herzog von Clermont
- Kurt von Lessen as Schreiber Collin
- Hanns Marschall as Yves
- Rida Waldeck
- Franz Bronen
- Louis Nerz

== Bibliography ==
- Paolo Caneppele & Günter Krenn. Elektrische Schatten. Filmarchiv Austria, 1999.
