= Ludwig Schaschek =

Austrian cinematographer

Ludwig Schaschek (9 August 1888 – 28 January 1948) was an Austrian cinematographer.

== Selected filmography ==
- Flora Mystica (1922)
- Tales of Old Vienna (1923)
- The Hell of Barballo (1923)
- Die heiratsfähige Puppe (1925)
- A Waltz by Strauss (1925)
- Die Königin von Moulin Rouge (1926)
- Der Rosenkavalier (1926)
- The Right to Live (1927)
- Das weisse Paradies (1929)

== Bibliography ==
- Jung, Uli & Schatzberg, Walter. Beyond Caligari: The Films of Robert Wiene. Berghahn Books, 1999.
