= Department Store Princess =

1926 film

- Theatrical film poster
- German: Die Warenhausprinzessin
- Directed by: Heinz Paul
- Written by: Herbert Juttke; Georg C. Klaren; Hella Moja
- Starring: Hella Moja; Hans Albers; Paul Heidemann
- Cinematography: Friedl Behn-Grund
- Music by: Pasquale Perris
- Production company: Boston-Films
- Release date: 17 December 1926
- Country: Germany
- Languages: Silent; German intertitles

Department Store Princess (German: Die Warenhausprinzessin) is a 1926 German silent film directed by Heinz Paul and starring Hella Moja, Hans Albers and Paul Heidemann. No copies of the film are known to survive.

The film's sets were designed by the art director Karl Machus.

== Synopsis ==
An exiled Russian Princess is so impoverished that she begins working as a mannequin in the clothes section of a department store.

== Cast ==
In alphabetical order

- Hans Albers
- Karl Beckersachs
- Oreste Bilancia
- Julius Falkenstein
- Paul Graetz
- Paul Heidemann as decorator in the department store
- Lotte Lorring as saleswoman in the laundry department
- Hella Moja as impoverished Russian princess
- Albert Paulig
- Hermann Picha
- Vicky Werckmeister
- Hugo Werner-Kahle
