= What a Girl =

1920 film directed by Urban Gad

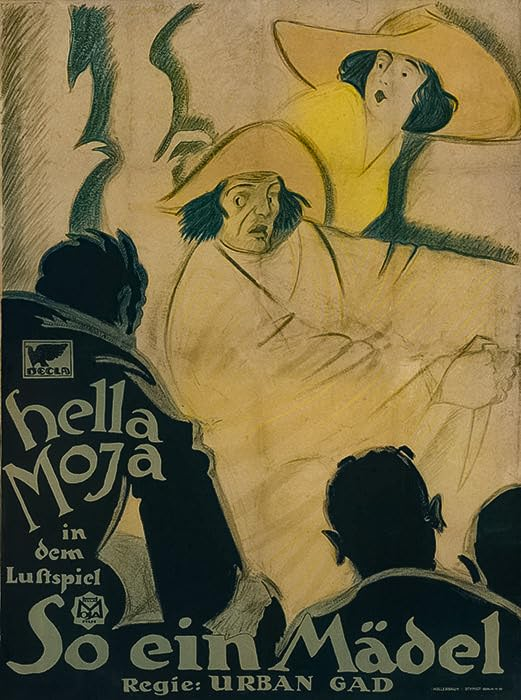
- Directed by: Urban Gad
- Written by: Hella Moja
- Produced by: Hella Moja
- Starring: Hella Moja; Harry Liedtke; Ferry Sikla
- Production company: Hella Moja-Film
- Release date: 1920
- Country: Germany
- Languages: Silent; German intertitles

What a Girl (German: So ein Mädel) is a 1920 German silent film directed by Urban Gad and starring Hella Moja, Harry Liedtke and Ferry Sikla.

== Cast ==
- Hella Moja
- Harry Liedtke
- Ferry Sikla
- Hermann Picha
- Ada Sorel
- Erner Huebsch
- Frida Richard
- Adolf Suchanek
- Georgine Sobjeska
- Karl Harbacher
- Max Maximilian
- Eva Sorel

== Bibliography ==
- Jill Nelmes & Jule Selbo. Women Screenwriters: An International Guide. Palgrave Macmillan, 2015.
