= Karl Forest =

Austrian actor

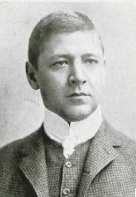
Karl Forest anno 1904

Karl Forest (1874–1944) was an Austrian actor. He was married to the actress Traute Carlsen.

== Selected filmography ==
- The Tales of Hoffmann (1923)
- The Money Devil (1923)
- Boarding House Groonen (1925)
- The Guardsman (1925)
- Der Rosenkavalier (1925)
- The Queen of Moulin Rouge (1926)
- Grandstand for General Staff (1926)
- Father Radetzky (1929)
- Little Veronica (1929)
- The Squeaker (1931)
- Die Fledermaus (1931)
- The Ringer (1932)
- Mamsell Nitouche (1932)
- Wehe, wenn er losgelassen (1932)
- Gently My Songs Entreat (1933)
- Asew (1935)
- Lumpaci the Vagabond (1936)
- Woman in the River (1939)
- Immortal Waltz (1939)

== Bibliography ==
- Jung, Uli & Schatzberg, Walter. Beyond Caligari: The Films of Robert Wiene. Berghahn Books, 1999.
