= Boarding House Groonen =

1925 film directed by Robert Wiene

- Directed by: Robert Wiene
- Written by: Louis Nerz
- Starring: Anton Edthofer; Karl Forest; Harry Nestor
- Cinematography: Hans Androschin; Günther Krampf
- Production company: Pan Film
- Release date: January 1925
- Country: Austria
- Languages: Silent; German intertitles

Boarding House Groonen (German: Pension Groonen) is a 1925 Austrian silent comedy film directed by Robert Wiene and starring Anton Edthofer, Karl Forest and Harry Nestor. It was Wiene's first film in Vienna, where he had moved to from Berlin to work for Pan Film. The film was made in 1924, but its premiere was delayed until 9 January 1925.

== Cast ==
- Anton Edthofer
- Karl Forest
- Harry Nestor
- Claude France
- Carmen Cartellieri
- Charlotte Ander
- Albert Heine

== Bibliography ==
- Jung, Uli & Schatzberg, Walter. Beyond Caligari: The Films of Robert Wiene. Berghahn Books, 1999.
