= The Money Devil =

1923 film

- Directed by: Heinz Goldberg
- Written by: Heinz Goldberg; Erich Pabst
- Starring: Stella Arbenina; Karl Forest; Otto Gebühr
- Cinematography: Max Lutze
- Production company: Wörner-Filmgesellschaft
- Distributed by: Wörner-Filmgesellschaft
- Release date: 30 July 1923
- Country: Germany
- Languages: Silent; German intertitles

The Money Devil (German: Der Geldteufel) is a 1923 German silent drama film directed by Heinz Goldberg and starring Stella Arbenina, Karl Forest and Otto Gebühr.

== Cast ==
In alphabetical order

- Stella Arbenina as Die Schwarze
- Karl Forest as Der Alte
- Otto Gebühr as Leonid Fenton
- John Gottowt as Black
- Suzanne Marwille as Marquise
- Luigi Serventi as Marquis Redonc
- Alexandra Sorina as Cyproenne Marlén
- Ferdinand von Alten as Chartelier

== Bibliography ==
- Bock, Hans-Michael & Bergfelder, Tim. The Concise CineGraph. Encyclopedia of German Cinema. Berghahn Books, 2009.
