= The Dice Game of Life =

1925 film

- Directed by: Heinz Paul
- Written by: Heinz Paul
- Starring: Frida Richard; Hella Moja; Margarete Lanner
- Cinematography: Willy Goldberger
- Production company: Pantomim-Film
- Distributed by: Pantomim-Film
- Release date: 21 August 1925
- Country: Germany
- Languages: Silent; German intertitles

The Dice Game of Life (German:Des Lebens Würfelspiel) is a 1925 German silent film directed by Heinz Paul and starring Frida Richard, Hella Moja and Margarete Lanner.

The film's art direction was by Botho Hoefer and Bernhard Schwidewski.

== Cast ==
- Frida Richard as Frau Witwe Krüger
- Hella Moja as Aenne, ihre Tochter
- Margarete Lanner as Lotte, Aennes Freundin
- Gerhard Ritterband as Laufbursche im Blumenhaus
- Paul Hartmann as Hanns Freiherr v. Rhoden
- Arnold Korff as Kommandeur des Ulanen-Regiments
- Hans Brausewetter as Emil Päschke, sein Bursche
- Wilhelm Diegelmann as Wilh. Päschke, Vater
- Ilka Grüning as Emils Mutter
- Hermann Vallentin as Kommerzienrat Reichenberg
- Olga Engl as Reichenbergs Frau
- Frizzi Richard as Ise - beider Tochter
- Ferdinand von Alten as Bankier George Neumann
- Karl Platen as Sein Diener
- Albert Paulig as Theaterdirektor
- Rudolf Klein-Rhoden as Großindustrieller Stenis
- Fritz Beckmann as Stellenvermittler
- Fritz Ruß as Lohndiener

== Bibliography ==
- Grange, William. Cultural Chronicle of the Weimar Republic. Scarecrow Press, 2008.
