= The Other Side (1931 film) =

1931 film

- Directed by: Heinz Paul
- Written by: Hella Moja; Hans Reisiger
- Based on: Journey's End by R.C. Sherriff
- Produced by: Joseph Candolini
- Starring: Conrad Veidt; Theodor Loos; Friedrich Ettel; Viktor de Kowa
- Cinematography: Viktor Gluck
- Edited by: Max Brenner
- Music by: Ernst Erich Buder
- Production company: Cando-Film
- Distributed by: Cando-Film
- Release date: 29 October 1931
- Running time: 107 minutes
- Country: Germany
- Language: German

The Other Side (German: Die andere Seite) is a 1931 German war film directed by Heinz Paul and starring Conrad Veidt, Theodor Loos and Friedrich Ettel. It is an adaptation of R.C. Sherriff's 1928 First World War play Journey's End which had been turned into a British-American film the previous year. Paul's film attempted to be faithful to the play, retaining the British setting rather than switching the story to feature German soldiers and going to great lengths to portray the "Britishness" of the characters. The film was positively received on its release. It was shot at the Johannisthal Studios in Berlin. The film's sets were designed by the art director Robert A. Dietrich.

== Synopsis ==
On the Western Front in 1918, shortly before the German Spring Offensive, young Lieutenant Raleigh arrives from England to join the company in the British trench lines. He is delighted to be serving under Captain Stanhope, whom he had known at school, and who is engaged to his elder sister. However, he discovers Stanhope is suffering from the effects of the war and has become disillusioned and alcoholic, while trying to maintain the façade of a courageous British officer.

== Cast ==
- Conrad Veidt as Hauptmann Stanhope
- Theodor Loos as Oberleutnant Osborne
- Friedrich Ettel as Leutnant Trotter
- Viktor de Kowa as Leutnant Hibbert
- Wolfgang Liebeneiner as Leutnant Raleigh
- Paul Otto as Oberst
- William Trenk as Koch
- Reinhold Bernt as Feldwebel
- John Mylong as Hauptmann Hardy

== Bibliography ==
- Kester, Bernadette (2003). Film Front Weimar: Representations of the First World War in German films of the Weimar Period (1919–1933). Amsterdam University Press. ISBN 978-90-5356-598-8.
- Schneider, Thomas F.; Hans, Wagener, eds. (2007). "Huns" Vs. "Corned Beef": Representations of the Other in American and German Literature and Film on World War I. V & R Unipress GmbH. ISBN 978-3-89971-385-5.
