= Roman Holiday =

1953 American romantic comedy

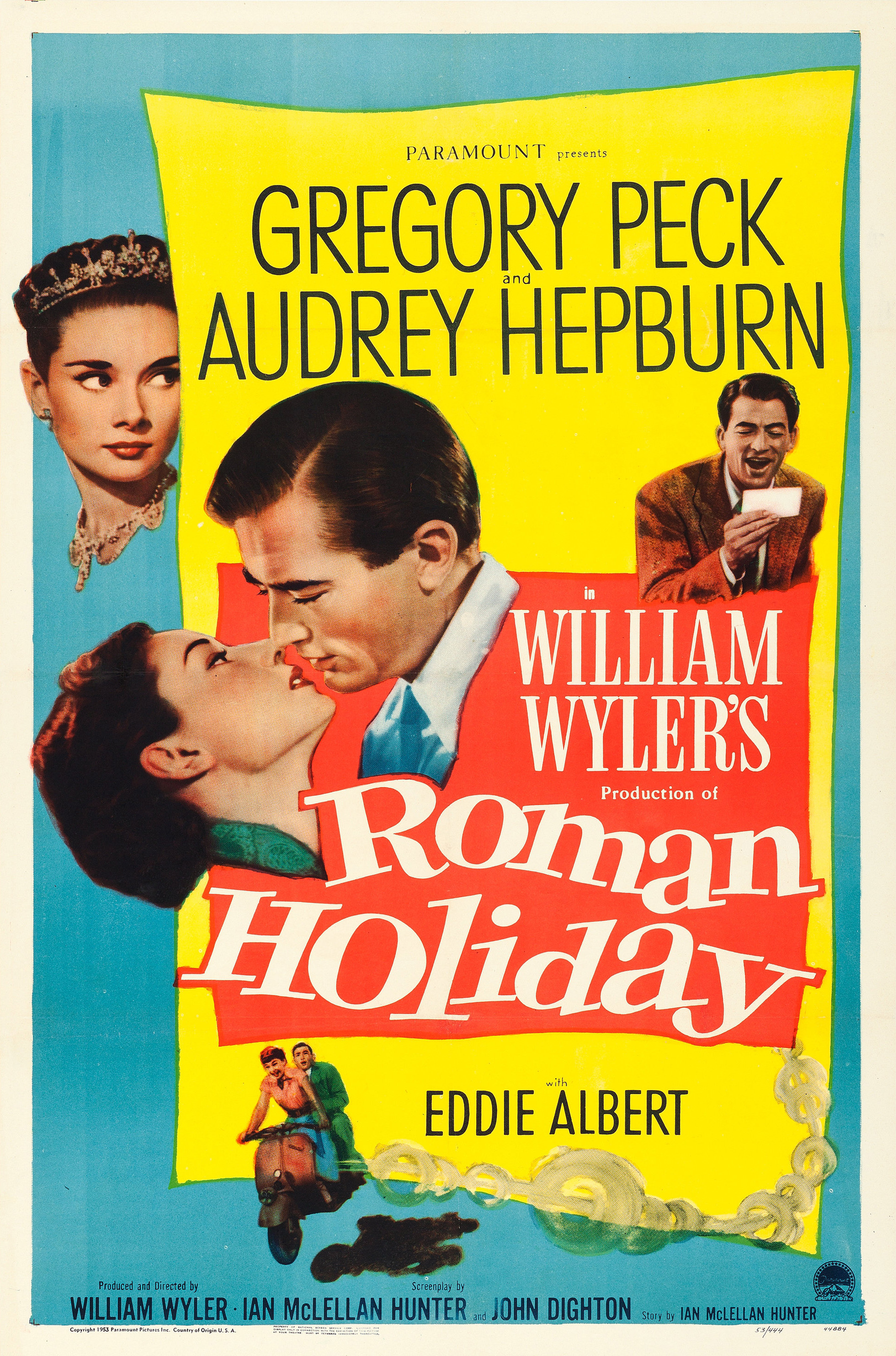
- Theatrical release poster
- Directed by: William Wyler
- Screenplay by: Dalton Trumbo; Ian McLellan Hunter; John Dighton
- Story by: Dalton Trumbo
- Produced by: William Wyler
- Starring: Gregory Peck; Audrey Hepburn; Eddie Albert
- Cinematography: Henri Alekan; Franz Planer
- Edited by: Robert Swink
- Music by: Georges Auric; Victor Young
- Distributed by: Paramount Pictures
- Release dates: August 20, 1953 (Venice); August 27, 1953 (USA)
- Running time: 118 minutes
- Country: United States
- Languages: English; Italian
- Budget: $1.5 million
- Box office: $12 million

Roman Holiday is a 1953 American romantic comedy film directed and produced by William Wyler. It stars Audrey Hepburn as a princess out to see Rome on her own and Gregory Peck as a reporter. Hepburn won an Academy Award for Best Actress for her performance; the film also won the Academy Award for Best Story and the Academy Award for Best Costume Design.

The script was written by Dalton Trumbo and John Dighton, though with Trumbo on the Hollywood blacklist, he did not receive a credit, and Ian McLellan Hunter fronted for him. Trumbo's name was reinstated when the film was released on DVD in 2003, and on December 19, 2011, full credit for Trumbo's work was restored. Blacklisted director Bernard Vorhaus worked on the film as an assistant director under a pseudonym.

The film was shot at the Cinecittà studios and on location around Rome during the "Hollywood on the Tiber" era. The film opened the 14th Venice International Film Festival within the official program. In 1999, Roman Holiday was selected for preservation in the United States National Film Registry by the Library of Congress as being "culturally, historically, or aesthetically significant". The film has been considered one of the most romantic films in cinema history.

== Plot ==
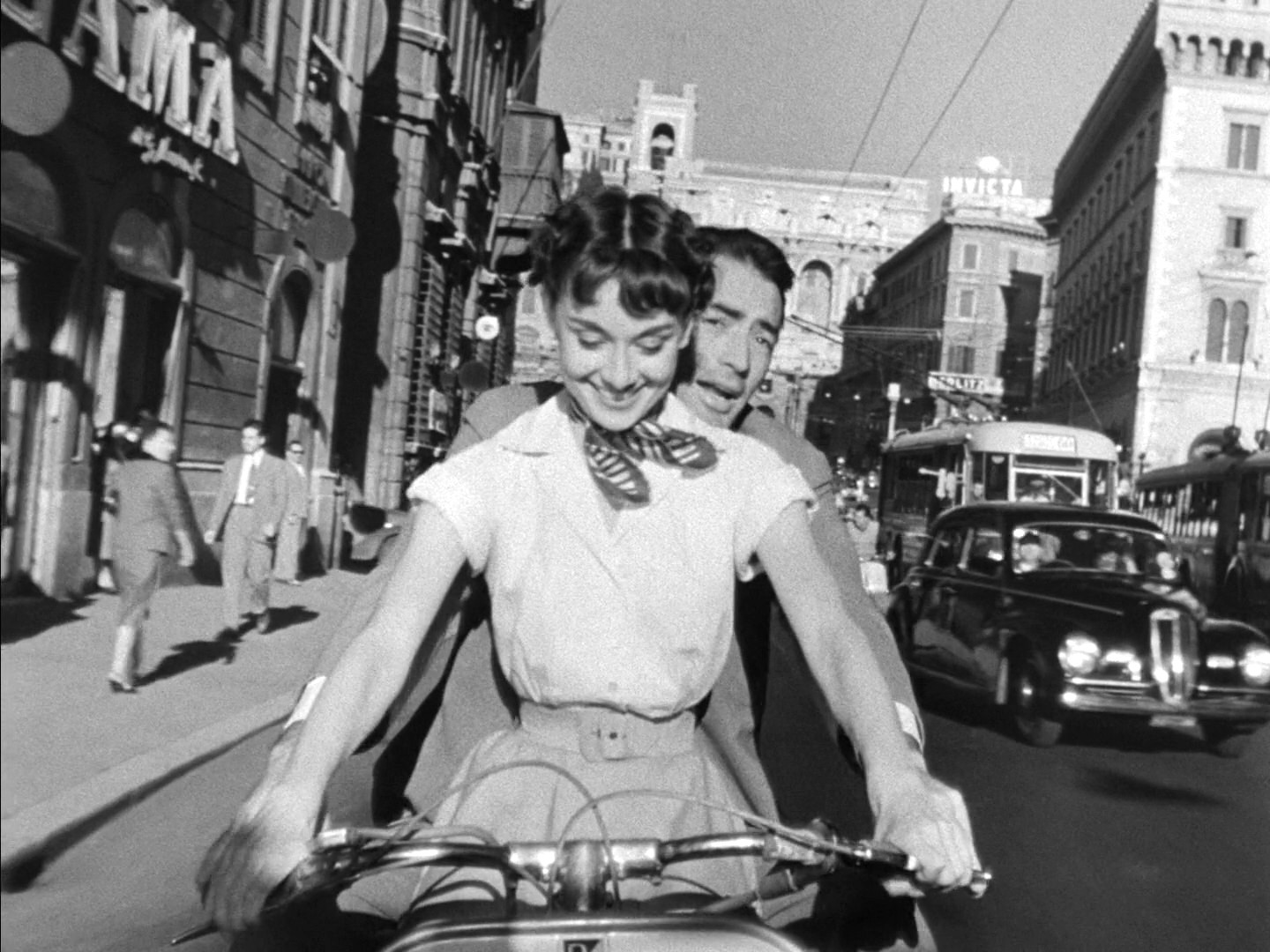
Joe and Ann career through Rome on a Vespa scooter.

Crown Princess Ann is on a loosely scheduled tour of European capital cities for her unnamed nation. After an especially hard day in Rome, her doctor gives her an injection and advises: "Best thing I know is to do exactly what you wish for a while." She secretly leaves the embassy to explore the city and, as the drug takes effect, falls asleep atop a low wall, where Joe Bradley, an American reporter, finds her. Not recognizing her, he thinks she is intoxicated and takes her to his apartment to sleep it off.

Joe oversleeps and misses the princess's scheduled press conference, but claims to his editor, Hennessy, that he attended. Hennessy shows him a news item about the cancellation of the press conference due to the princess's "sudden illness". Joe realizes the woman in his apartment is the princess from the newspaper photograph, and asks Hennessy what he would pay for an exclusive interview with her. Hennessy offers $5000, and counters with a $500 bet that Joe will not be able to get it.

Joe calls his photographer friend, Irving Radovich, and offers to show "Anya" around Rome, without revealing that he is a reporter and that he knows her true identity. Ann cites an important appointment and leaves. Joe follows and sees her explore an outdoor market, buy shoes, and get her long hair cut short. Joe contrives to bump into her on the Spanish Steps and convinces her to spend the day with him, taking her to a street café to meet up with Irving, who takes pictures with a camera concealed in his cigarette lighter. Ann claims to be playing truant from school. When Ann clumsily drives a Vespa through Roman traffic with Joe as a passenger, they are arrested, but Joe and Irving show their "fake" press passes, claiming Joe and Anya are to be married and are released. They tour the Colosseum. Joe then takes Ann to the Mouth of Truth and tells her the legend attached to it: if a liar puts their hand in the mouth, it will be bitten off. After Ann tries it after hesitating, it is Joe's turn, and he startles her by pretending that his hand has been cut off.

As they attend a dance on a boat that her barber had invited her to, agents from Ann's government try to forcibly take her back. Ann joins Joe, Irving, and the barber to fight them, and smashes a guitar over one of the pursuers' heads. When Joe is knocked into the river, Ann jumps in after him. They swim away and kiss as they sit shivering on the riverbank. While drying their wet clothes at Joe's apartment, a radio bulletin says that the people of Ann's country are concerned that her illness may be serious. Ann asks Joe to drive her to a corner near the embassy, where they kiss again. She bids him a tearful farewell, commanding him not to follow.

Upon her return, the princess replies to those attempting to remind her of her duty, "Were I not completely aware of my duty to my family and my country, I would not have come back tonight...or indeed ever again." Joe tells a disbelieving Hennessy that he did not get the story, but tells Irving he cannot stop him from selling the photographs. Joe and Irving attend the rescheduled press conference, to Ann's surprise. She asserts her faith in relations between nations just as between people, and Joe assures her that her faith is not misplaced. When asked which city she most enjoyed visiting, she begins to say it would be difficult to choose before declaring "Rome. By all means, Rome." Other photographers take pictures with their large press cameras, while Irving makes a show of using his cigarette lighter. Ann speaks briefly with each journalist, and Irving presents her with his photographs as a memento of Rome. Joe remains behind after everyone else leaves, before walking from the room.

== Cast ==
- Gregory Peck as Joe Bradley
- Audrey Hepburn as Princess Ann/Anya 'Smitty' Smith
- Eddie Albert as Irving Radovich
- Hartley Power as Mr Hennessy
- Harcourt Williams as Ambassador
- Margaret Rawlings as Countess Vereberg
- Tullio Carminati as General Provno
- Paolo Carlini as Mario Delani
- Claudio Ermelli as Giovanni
- Paola Borboni as charwoman
- Alfredo Rizzo as taxi driver
- Laura Solari as secretary
- Gorella Gori as shoe seller
- Hans Hinrich as Dr. Bonnachoven (uncredited)

== Production ==
=== Casting ===
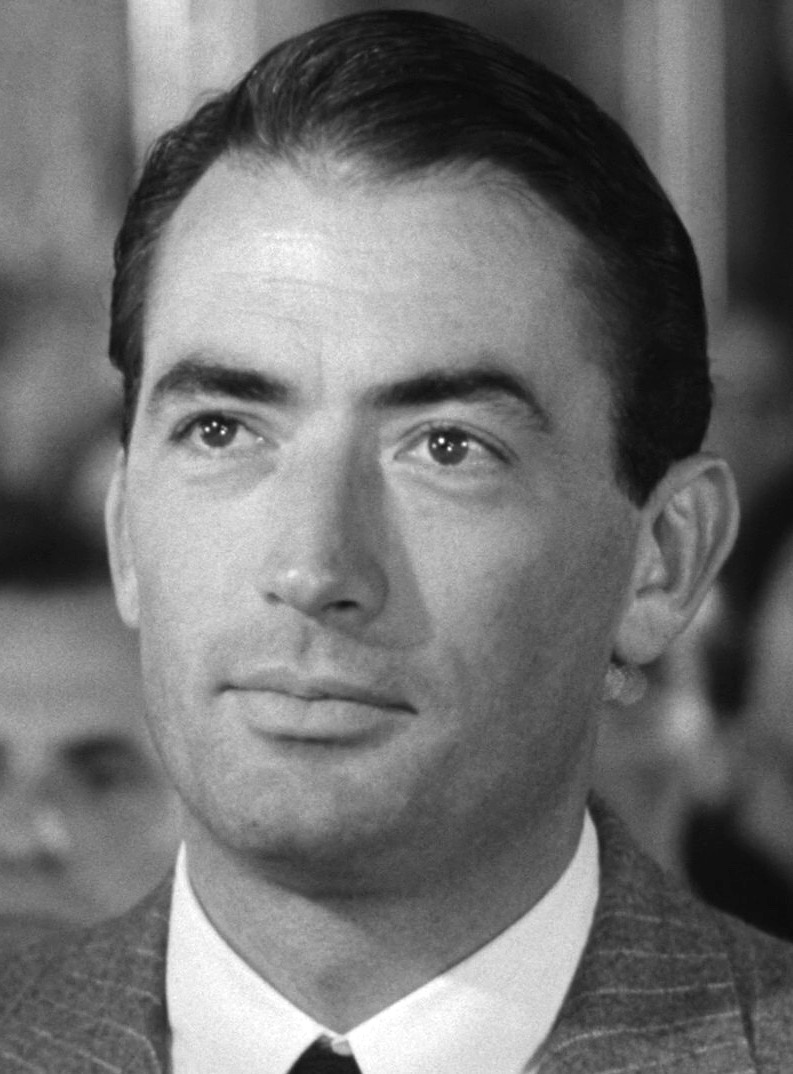
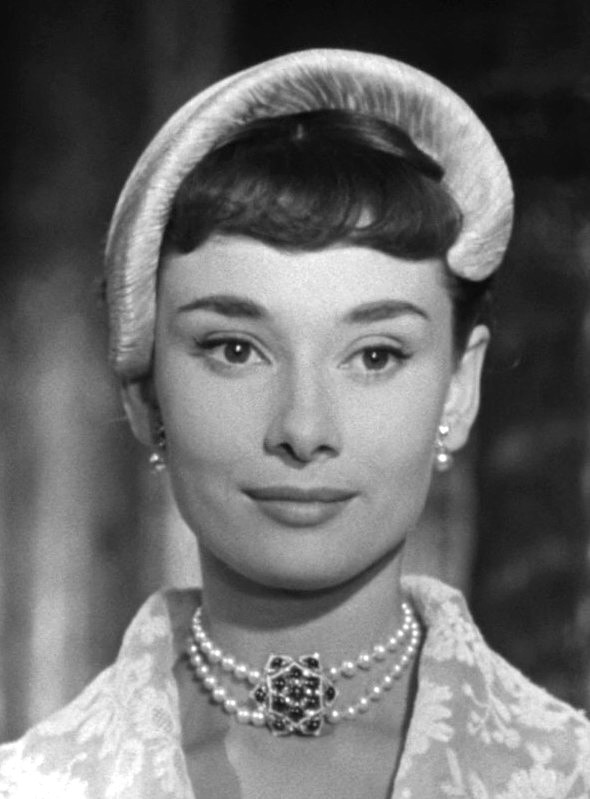
Gregory Peck and Audrey Hepburn as Joe Bradley and Princess Ann

Wyler first offered the role to Hollywood favorite Cary Grant. Grant declined, believing he was too old to play Hepburn's character's love interest, though he would do so ten years later in Charade. Other sources say Grant declined because he knew all of the attention would be centered on the princess. Peck's contract gave him solo star billing, with newcomer Hepburn listed much less prominently in the credits. Halfway through the filming, Peck suggested to Wyler that he elevate her to equal billing—an almost unheard-of gesture in Hollywood.

Wyler had initially considered Elizabeth Taylor and Jean Simmons for the princess role, but both were unavailable. On 18 September 1951, director Thorold Dickinson made a screen test with Hepburn and sent it to director William Wyler, who was in Rome preparing Roman Holiday. Wyler wrote to Dickinson, saying that "as a result of the test, a number of the producers at Paramount have expressed interest in casting her." Roman Holiday was not Hepburn's first acting role, as she had appeared in Dutch and British films from 1948 and on stage, but it was her first major film role and her first appearance in an American film. Wyler wanted an "anti-Italian" actress who was different from the curvy Italian stars of that era: She was perfect; his new star had, in words attributed to Wyler, "no arse, no tits, no tight-fitting clothes, no high heels. In short a Martian. She will be a sensation."

=== Filming locations ===
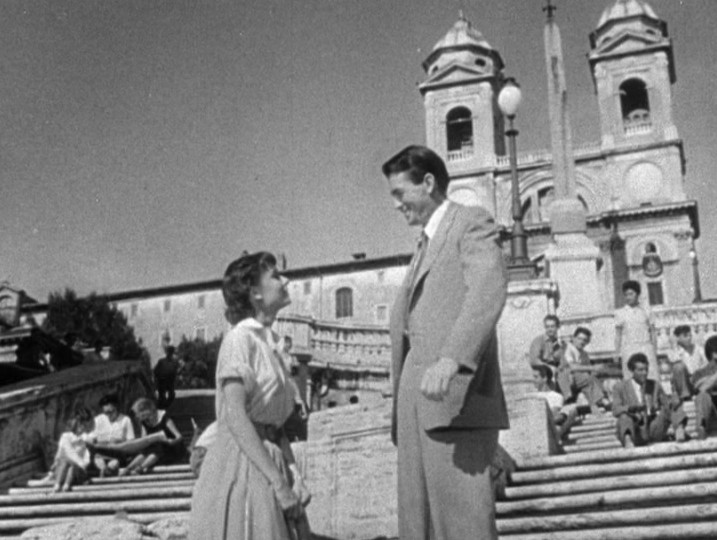
Ann and Joe meet on the Spanish Steps in the Piazza di Spagna.

The Italian Ministry of Tourism had originally refused permission for the movie to be filmed in Rome on the grounds that it would "degrade Italians". Once the matter was resolved, filming took place entirely in Rome and in the studios of Cinecittà. Wyler wanted to shoot the film in color, but doing so on location was so expensive that it had to be done in black and white.

Locations include:

- Mouth of Truth, Piazza Bocca della Verità, Church of Santa Maria in Cosmedin
- Caffè Rocca, Piazza della Rotonda and Pantheon
- Castel Sant'Angelo
- Trevi Fountain
- Piazza Venezia
- Piazza di Spagna
- Spanish Steps
- Trinità dei Monti
- Colosseum
- Tiber River
- Via Margutta 51, the location of Joe's apartment where he hosts Princess Ann
- Via dei Fori Imperiali
- Via della Stamperia 85, the barber shop where Ann has her hair cut
- Palazzo Colonna Gallery, shown in the final scenes of the princess's press appearance
- Palazzo Brancaccio, the princess' ornate Roman bedroom.

== Reception and accolades ==
The film's trailer

=== Critical response ===
The film opened the 14th Venice International Film Festival on August 20, 1953. It opened at Radio City Music Hall in New York City on August 27, 1953, grossing $165,000 in its first week. The film also opened the same week in two theatres in Portland, Oregon, on a double bill with Murder Without Tears, grossing $14,000.

The film received critical acclaim from reviewers of its initial release. Milton Luban of The Hollywood Reporter said the movie "proves a charming, laugh-provoking affair that often explodes into hilarity... it has a delightful screenplay that sparkles with wit and outrageous humor that at times comes close to slapstick" and that the "cinematographers do a fine job of incorporating Roman landmarks into the storyline". The New York Times observed that it was "a natural, tender and amusing yarn" with "laughs that leave the spirits soaring".

Roman Holiday was the second most popular film at the US box office during September 1953 behind From Here to Eternity, grossing almost $1 million. It earned an estimated $3 million at the United States and Canadian box office during its first few months of release, and a total of $5 million. While the domestic box office disappointed Paramount, it was very successful elsewhere, including the UK, where the film benefited from both the current romance between Princess Margaret and commoner Peter Townsend—"No film studio could have bought such publicity", Alexander Walker wrote—and a fad for Italian culture. It earned around $12 million in the overseas market.

Due to the film's popularity, both Peck and Hepburn were approached about filming a sequel, but this project never got off the ground.

The film has been well received, with a 95% rating at Rotten Tomatoes, based on 63 reviews with an average rating of 8.50/10. The website's critical consensus reads: "With Audrey Hepburn luminous in her American debut, Roman Holiday is as funny as it is beautiful, and sets the standard for the modern romantic comedy." It is considered a classic by twenty-first-century viewers and reviewers. Peter Bradshaw of The Guardian noted that the film is a "modern fairytale whose two leads have a charm and innocence that irradiate the whole movie", giving the film five out of five. Empire concluded that the film is a "timeless, exuberant classic, with Hepburn's naïve sense of fun and perfectly charming performance matched equally by Peck's louche and charismatic worldy American". James Berardinelli of ReelViews gave the film three and a half stars out of four, calling the movie a "staple of the romantic comedy fan's library", and "remains one of only a few black-and-white movies that modern audiences willingly watch".

The film was very popular outside of the United States. As late as of 1990, it was cited as the favorite foreign film of all time for Japanese audiences.

The February 2020 issue of New York Magazine lists Roman Holiday as among "The Best Movies That Lost Best Picture at the Oscars."

=== Awards and nominations ===
Award	Category	Nominee(s)	Result	Ref.
Academy Awards	Best Motion Picture	William Wyler	Nominated	
Academy Awards	Best Director	William Wyler	Nominated	
Academy Awards	Best Actress	Audrey Hepburn	Won	
Academy Awards	Best Supporting Actor	Eddie Albert	Nominated	
Academy Awards	Best Screenplay	Ian McLellan Hunter and John Dighton	Nominated	
Academy Awards	Best Story	Dalton Trumbo	Won	
Academy Awards	Best Art Direction – Black-and-White	Hal Pereira and Walter H. Tyler	Nominated	
Academy Awards	Best Cinematography – Black-and-White	Franz Planer and Henri Alekan	Nominated	
Academy Awards	Best Costume Design – Black-and-White	Edith Head	Won	
Academy Awards	Best Film Editing	Robert Swink	Nominated	
Bambi Awards	Best Actor – International	Gregory Peck	Nominated	
Bambi Awards	Best Actress – International	Audrey Hepburn	Nominated	
British Academy Film Awards	Best Film		Nominated	
British Academy Film Awards	Best Foreign Actor	Eddie Albert	Nominated	
British Academy Film Awards	Best Foreign Actor	Gregory Peck	Nominated	
British Academy Film Awards	Best British Actress	Audrey Hepburn	Won	
Directors Guild of America Awards	Outstanding Directorial Achievement in Motion Pictures	William Wyler	Nominated	
Golden Globe Awards	Best Actress in a Motion Picture – Drama	Audrey Hepburn	Won	
Huabiao Film Awards	Outstanding Translated Foreign Film		Won	
National Board of Review Awards	Top Ten Films		6th Place	
National Film Preservation Board	National Film Registry		Inducted	
New York Film Critics Circle Awards	Best Film		Nominated	
New York Film Critics Circle Awards	Best Actress	Audrey Hepburn	Won	
Venice International Film Festival	Golden Lion	William Wyler	Nominated	
Writers Guild of America Awards	Best Written American Comedy	Ian McLellan Hunter, Dalton Trumbo, and John Dighton	Won	

- The Academy Award for Best Story was initially given to Ian McLellan Hunter, since he took story credit on behalf of Dalton Trumbo (who was blacklisted). The Academy of Motion Picture Arts and Sciences later credited the win to Trumbo, and in 1993 Trumbo's widow, Cleo, received her late husband's Oscar.
- In 1999, Roman Holiday was selected for preservation in the United States National Film Registry by the Library of Congress as being "culturally, historically, or aesthetically significant".
- The American Film Institute lists the film at No. 4 in its AFI's 100 Years...100 Passions, and at No. 4 in the romantic comedy category in its AFI's 10 Top 10.

== Adaptations ==
Several films were later claimed to be based on Roman Holiday or to be similar to it. They include the Malayalam Kilukkam (1991), the Tamil-language May Madham (1994),, Basta't Kasama Kita (1995) - which is a loose Philippine adaptation, and Notting Hill (1999) - which a review described as "a 90's London-set version of Roman Holiday"

When Lewis Gilbert was making The Adventurers for Paramount, he said Charles Bludhorn, whose company owned the studio, wanted the director to make a musical remake of Roman Holiday with songs by the Sherman Brothers. Gilbert agreed but said Paramount then got "cold feet" and the film was cancelled. The director went on to make Seven Nights in Japan (1976), which was in the style of Roman Holiday. Paramount Pictures has since licensed three musical adaptations of Roman Holiday: Toho's Japanese version of 1998; Teatro Sistina's Vacanze romane (2004), using the Cole Porter score, supplemented with music by Armando Trovajoli, which has since toured Italy and Spain; and the American stage version of 2012, described as a jukebox musical using the songs of Cole Porter.

== See also ==
- List of films set in Rome
- List of oldest and youngest Academy Award winners and nominees — Youngest winners for Best Lead Actress
