= Modern Marriages =

1924 film directed by Hans Otto

- Directed by: Hans Otto
- Written by: Felix Salten; Paul Busson; Béla Balázs; Hans Otto; Josef Kokeisl
- Starring: Fritz Kortner; Helena Makowska
- Cinematography: Fritz Baier; Gustav Roth
- Production companies: Filmindustrie; Welt-Film
- Distributed by: UFA
- Release date: 10 December 1924
- Countries: Czechoslovakia; Germany
- Languages: Silent; German intertitles

Modern Marriages (German: Moderne Ehen) is a 1924 Czech-German silent comedy film directed by Hans Otto and starring Fritz Kortner and Helena Makowska.

== Cast ==
- S. Polonsky as Prof. Holstein
- Helena Makowska as Thea Holstein
- Ernst Stahl-Nachbaur as Baron von Norden
- Claude France as Baronin von Norden
- Harry Nestor as Dr. Fritz Röller
- Fritz Kortner as Diener
- Ellen Reith as Baronin Elsa Bassian
- Paul Askonas as Möller
- William Dieterle as Prof. Heinrich
- Dagny Servaes as Heinrichs Frau
- Suzanne Marwille as Manon
- Theodor Pištěk as Kwiatkowski
- Mario Karas as Jirí Brodský
- Joe Jencík as Ferry
- Kamil Veselý as Mitglied der Kommission
- Sasa Dobrovolná as Manons Tante
- Bonda Szynglarski as Kellner
- Ella Hrabánková as Kind / Tänzerin

== Bibliography ==
- Grange, William. Cultural Chronicle of the Weimar Republic. Scarecrow Press, 2008.
