= The Venus =

1922 film directed by Hans Homma

- Directed by: Hans Homma
- Written by: Prosper Mérimée (novel); Louis Nerz
- Starring: Raoul Aslan; Magda Sonja; Nora Gregor
- Cinematography: Hans Androschin
- Production company: Pan-Film
- Release date: 13 January 1922
- Country: Austria
- Languages: Silent; German intertitles

The Venus (German: Die Venus) is a 1922 Austrian silent film directed by Hans Homma and starring Raoul Aslan, Magda Sonja and Nora Gregor.

== Cast ==
- Raoul Aslan as Paul Greville
- Magda Sonja as Gräfin
- Nora Gregor as Yvonne
- Louis Nerz as Graf
- Franz Everth as Juan Salvador
- Robert Balajthy
- Sevrol Taipeth

== Bibliography ==
- Paolo Caneppele & Günter Krenn. Elektrische Schatten. Filmarchiv Austria, 1999.
