= The Ghost of Morton's Castle =

1922 film directed by Hans Homma

- Directed by: Hans Homma
- Starring: Grit Haid; Egon von Jordan
- Cinematography: Hans Androschin
- Production company: Pan-Film
- Release date: 18 August 1922
- Country: Austria
- Languages: Silent; German intertitles

The Ghost of Morton's Castle (German: Das Gespenst auf Mortons Schloß) is a 1922 Austrian silent film directed by Hans Homma and starring Grit Haid and Egon von Jordan.

== Cast ==
- Grit Haid
- Egon von Jordan
- Lia Landt
- Ellinor Kersten
- Harry De Loon as Gref Ludwig Salm
- Julius Strobl
- Ernst Ludwig
- Hermann Wail

== Bibliography ==
- Paolo Caneppele & Günter Krenn. Elektrische Schatten. Filmarchiv Austria, 1999.
