= Franz Lehár (film) =

1923 film

- Directed by: Wilhelm Thiele; Hans Torre
- Music by: Franz Lehár
- Production company: Thalia-Film
- Release date: 19 March 1923
- Country: Austria
- Languages: Silent; German intertitles

Franz Lehár is a 1923 Austrian silent biographical film directed by Wilhelm Thiele and Hans Torre. It portrays the life of the composer Franz Lehár. Lehár was supportive of the film and wrote a score to accompany it based on his own operettas.

== Bibliography ==
- Fawkes, Richard (2000). Opera on Film. London: Duckworth. ISBN 978-0-7156-2943-7.
