= Johannes Brandt =

Austrian screenwriter and film director

Johannes Brandt (1884–1955) was an Austrian screenwriter and film director.

== Selected filmography ==
=== Screenwriter ===
- Diamonds (1920)
- The Three Dances of Mary Wilford (1920)
- Das Haus des Dr. Gaudeamus (1921)
- Ash Wednesday (1921)
- The Call of Destiny (1922)
- Felicitas Grolandin (1923)
- King of Women (1923)
- The Clever Fox (1926)
- Trude (1926)
- Excluded from the Public (1927)
- Women on the Edge (1929)
- The White Roses of Ravensberg (1929)
- The Flute Concert of Sanssouci (1930)
- The Prosecutor Hallers (1930)
- The Other (1930)
- The Song of the Nations (1931)
- The Street Song (1931)
- Hooray, It's a Boy! (1931)
- This One or None (1932)
- Gitta Discovers Her Heart (1932)
- Under False Flag (1932)
- The Hymn of Leuthen (1933)

=== Director ===
- The Standard-Bearer of Sedan (1927)

== Bibliography ==
- Jung, Uli & Schatzberg, Walter. Beyond Caligari: The Films of Robert Wiene. Berghahn Books, 1999.
