= Immortal Melodies (1935 film) =

1936 film

- Directed by: Heinz Paul
- Written by: Alice Lach; Hella Moja
- Produced by: Franz Antel
- Starring: Alfred Jerger; Maria Paudler; Lizzi Holzschuh
- Cinematography: Karl Kurzmayer
- Music by: Oskar Stalla
- Production company: Tassul-Film
- Release date: 14 November 1935
- Running time: 75 minutes
- Country: Austria
- Language: German

Immortal Melodies (German: Unsterbliche Melodien) is a 1935 Austrian historical musical drama film directed by Heinz Paul and starring Alfred Jerger, Maria Paudler and Lizzi Holzschuh. The film was inspired by the life of the Austrian composer Johann Strauss known as the Waltz King. It was distributed in the Germany the following year.

== Synopsis ==
Johann Strauss has married a ballet student whose lack of maturity makes him realise she is too young for him and they divorce. Instead he finds fresh inspiration from an operetta singer who has left the United States to return to the Austrian Empire.

== Cast ==
- Alfred Jerger as Johann Strauss
- Maria Paudler as Maria Geistinger
- Lizzi Holzschuh as Lily Dietrich
- Leo Slezak as Verleger Haslinger
- Hans Homma as Director vom Theater an der Wien
- Kurt von Lessen as Genee, Librettist
- Eduard Wesener as Ferrandt
- Iris Arlan as Fini
- Rudolf Carl as Stephan, Butler
- Annie Rosar as Brigitte, the cook
- Richard Eybner as Der Ballettmeister
- Oskar Pouché as Nicki
- Richard Waldemar as Der Portier
- Mizi Griebl as Die Garderobierin
- Lina Frank as Frau Wimberger

== Bibliography ==
- Klaus, Ulrich J. Deutsche Tonfilme: Jahrgang 1935. Klaus-Archiv, 1988.
- Riethmüller, Albrecht & Kater, Michael H. Music and Nazism: Art Under Tyranny, 1933-1945. Laaber, 2003.
- Von Dassanowsky, Robert. Screening Transcendence: Film Under Austrofascism and the Hollywood Hope, 1933-1938. Indiana University Press, 2018
