= Eddy Polo in the Wasp's Nest =

1928 film

- Directed by: Léo Lasko
- Written by: Richard Hutter
- Starring: Eddie Polo; Grit Haid; Heddy Waldow
- Cinematography: Eduard von Borsody
- Production company: Boston Film
- Release date: 13 July 1928
- Country: Germany
- Languages: Silent; German intertitles

Eddy Polo in the Wasp's Nest (German: Eddy Polo im Wespennest) is a 1928 German silent action film directed by Léo Lasko and starring Eddie Polo, Grit Haid and Heddy Waldow.

The film's sets were designed by the art director Karl Görge.

== Cast ==
- Eddie Polo as Eddy Polo
- Grit Haid as Ellinor van der Straaten
- Heddy Waldow as Sigrid, ihre Freundin
- Alfred Krafft-Lortzing as Fritz Clarens
- Nico Turoff as Athletenkarl
- Steffi Lorée as Nelly, seine Schwester
- Max Maximilian as Stummelmaxe
- Aruth Wartan as Nebenpaule
- Harry Nestor as Kavalierharry
- Bruno Ziener as Diener bei Clarens

== Bibliography ==
- Alfred Krautz. International directory of cinematographers, set- and costume designers in film, Volume 4. Saur, 1984.
