= The Woman of Yesterday and Tomorrow =

1928 film

- German poster
- Directed by: Heinz Paul
- Written by: Alfred Schirokauer
- Based on: The Woman of Yesterday and Tomorrow by Alfred Schirokauer
- Produced by: Josef W. Beyer
- Starring: Arlette Marchal; Vivian Gibson; Livio Pavanelli
- Cinematography: Hans Theyer
- Production company: Ottol-Film
- Distributed by: Werner Film
- Release date: 13 July 1928
- Running time: 101 minutes
- Country: Austria
- Languages: Silent; German intertitles

The Woman of Yesterday and Tomorrow (German: Die Frau von gestern und morgen) is a 1928 Austrian silent drama film directed by Heinz Paul and starring Arlette Marchal, Vivian Gibson, Livio Pavanelli. It was shot at Schönbrunn Studios in Vienna. It is based on the novel of the same title by Alfred Schirokauer. The film's sets were designed by the art director Hans Ledersteger .

== Synopsis ==
A famous divorce lawyer falls in love with a woman but is reluctant to commit to her because his work has left him so cynical about marriage.

== Cast ==
- Arlette Marchal as Hilde von Lobach
- Vivian Gibson as Marya Fjodrowna Jsajeff
- Livio Pavanelli as Dr. Röhn - Scheidungsanwalt
- Fritz Alberti as Oberst von Lobach
- Igo Sym as Erwin Oven
- Hans Homma
- Fritz Strassny
- Viktor Franz
- Julia Janssen
- Helene Lauterböck
- Maria Korten
- Cornelius Kirschner
- Hermann Frischler
- Karl Friedl
- Alfred Lohner
- Wilhelm Völcker
- Hermann Benke
- Anna Kallina

== Bibliography ==
- Klapdor, Heike. Mit anderen Augen: Exil und Film. Edition Text & Kritik, 2021.
