= Countess Walewska (1920 film) =

1920 film directed by Otto Rippert

- Directed by: Otto Rippert
- Written by: Paul Georg; Willy Rath
- Produced by: Heinz Paul
- Starring: Hella Moja; Rudolf Lettinger; Anton Edthofer
- Cinematography: Max Lutze
- Production company: Terra Film
- Distributed by: Terra Film
- Release date: 1920
- Country: Germany
- Languages: Silent; German intertitles

Countess Walewska (German: Gräfin Walewska) is a 1920 German silent historical film directed by Otto Rippert and starring Hella Moja, Rudolf Lettinger and Anton Edthofer.

The film's sets were designed by the art director Ernst Stern.

== Cast ==
- Hella Moja as Gräfin Walewska
- Rudolf Lettinger as Napoleon
- Arnold Czempin as von Branicki
- Anton Edthofer as Graf D'Evians, zeitweiliger Adjutant
- Emil Heyse as Graf Walewska
- Margarete Kupfer as Frau von Laczinska, Gräfin Walewskas Mutter
- Auguste Prasch-Grevenberg as Josefa Czeliga
- Magnus Stifter as Duroc, Großmarschall
- Mechthildis Thein as Frau von Czytkowska
- Wolfgang von Schwindt as Ruston, Leib-Mameluk des Kaisers

== Bibliography ==
- Waltraud Maierhofer & Gertrud M. Roesch. Women Against Napoleon: Historical and Fictional Responses to His Rise and Legacy. Campus Verlag, 2007.
