= Grit Haid =

Austrian actress (1900–1938)

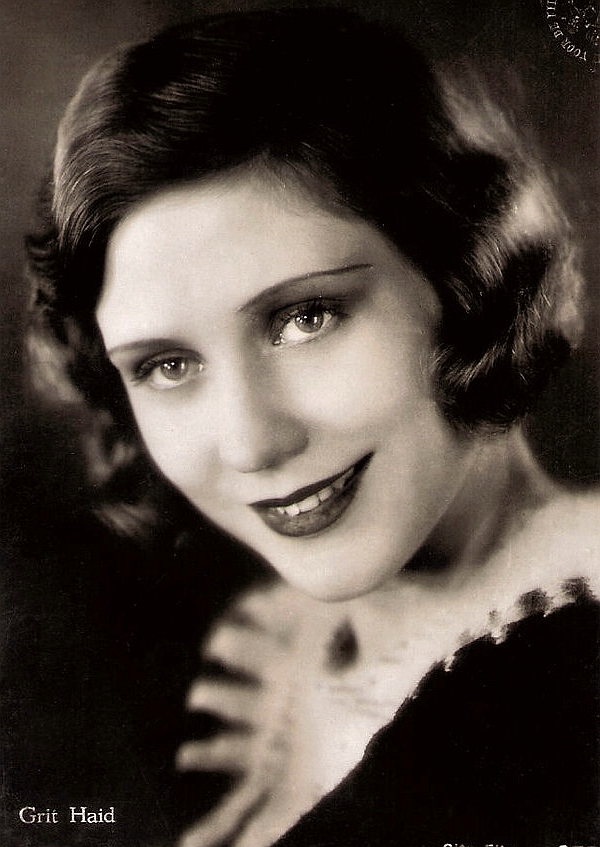
- Born: Margarete Haid; 14 March 1900; Vienna, Austria-Hungary
- Died: 13 August 1938 (aged 38); Schwarzwald, Nazi Germany
- Other name: Grete Haid
- Occupation: Actress
- Years active: 1915–1935
- Relatives: Liane Haid (sister)

Grit Haid (born Margarete Haid, 14 March 1900 – 13 August 1938) was an Austrian stage and film actress. She was the younger sister of the actress Liane Haid. She died in a plane crash in 1938.

== Selected filmography ==
- Don Cesar, Count of Irun (1918)
- Emperor Charles (1921)
- The Daughter of the Brigadier (1922)
- The Marquise of Clermont (1922)
- The Ghost of Morton's Castle (1922)
- Tales of Old Vienna (1923)
- The Hell of Barballo (1923)
- The Three Mannequins (1926)
- People to Each Other (1926)
- We Belong to the Imperial-Royal Infantry Regiment (1926)
- Young Blood (1926)
- Marie's Soldier (1927)
- Carnival Magic (1927)
- Rinaldo Rinaldini (1927)
- A Girl with Temperament (1928)
- Eddy Polo in the Wasp's Nest (1928)
- Suzy Saxophone (1928)
- Give Me Life (1928)
- From a Bachelor's Diary (1929)
- His Best Friend (1929)
- Andreas Hofer (1929)
- Marriage in Name Only (1930)
- Reckless Youth (1931)
- Gypsy Blood (1934)

== Bibliography ==
- Jennifer M. Kapczynski & Michael D. Richardson. A New History of German Cinema.
