= Lizzi Holzschuh =

Austrian singer and actress

- Born: 3 January 1908; Vienna, Austro-Hungarian Empire
- Died: 23 July 1979 (aged 71); Vienna
- Occupations: Actress, singer
- Years active: 1932–1962 (film & TV)

Lizzi Holzschuh (1908–1979) was an Austrian singer and Actor.

== Selected filmography ==
- Our Emperor (1933)
- The Cousin from Nowhere (1934)
- The Gentleman Without a Residence (1934)
- Heaven on Earth (1935)
- Immortal Melodies (1935)
- The Fairy Doll (1936)
- Rendezvous in Vienna (1936)
- The Charm of La Boheme (1937)
- Escape to the Adriatic (1937)
- Falstaff in Vienna (1940)
- Viennese Girls (1945)
- Candidates for Marriage (1958)

== Bibliography ==
- Goble, Alan. The Complete Index to Literary Sources in Film. Walter de Gruyter, 1999.
