= Hans Homma =

Austrian actor and film director

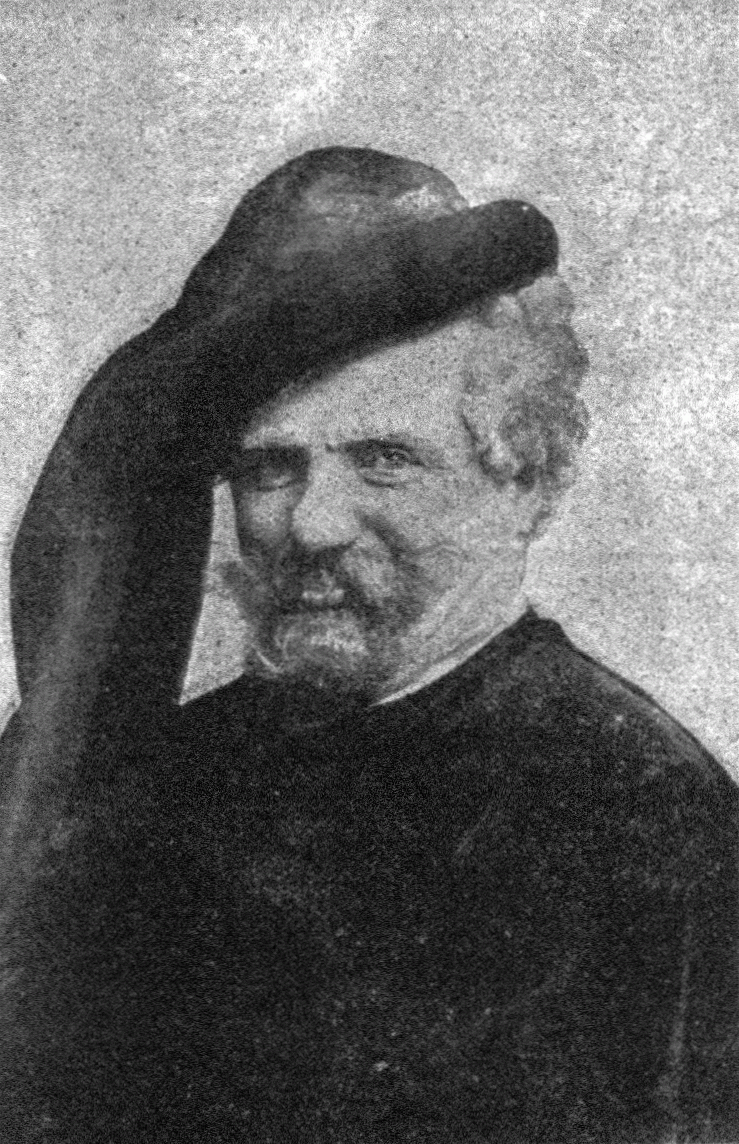
- Homma as Falstaff in 1906
- Born: 22 April 1874; Vienna, Austro-Hungarian Empire
- Died: 8 May 1943 (aged 69); Vienna, Nazi Germany
- Occupations: Actor, director
- Years active: 1912–1936 (film)

Hans Homma (1874–1943) was an Austrian stage and film actor. He also directed a number of silent films.

Homma was known for his work at Vienna's Burgtheater.

== Filmography ==
=== Actor ===
- Queen Draga (1920) – Dr. White
- The Hands of Orlac (1924) – Dr. Serral
- The Woman of Yesterday and Tomorrow (1928)
- Modellhaus Crevette (1928)
- Archduke John (1929) – Fürst Metternich, Staatskanzler
- Die Dame auf der Banknote (1929)
- The Monte Cristo of Prague (1929) – Examining Judge
- Spring Parade (1934) – Ein Hofrat (uncredited)
- Leap into Bliss (1934) – Braun – Geschäftsführer
- The Secret of Cavelli (1934) – General von Ketterer
- Bretter, die die Welt bedeuten (1935) – Herr Rainer, Pauls Vater
- Immortal Melodies (1935) – Director vom Theater an der Wien
- Last Love (1935) – Direktor der Wiener Oper
- Her Highness Dances the Waltz (1935) – Fürst Franz von Hohenau
- Flowers from Nice (1936) – Francois (final film role)

=== Director ===
- The Venus (1922)
- The Ghost of Morton's Castle (1922)
- The Marquise of Clermont (1922)
- The Hell of Barballo (1923)

== Bibliography ==
- Ryan Shand, Small-Gauge Storytelling: Discovering the Amateur Fiction Film: Discovering the Amateur Fiction Film. Edinburgh University Press, 2013.
