= Albert Heine =

German-Jewish stage and film actor

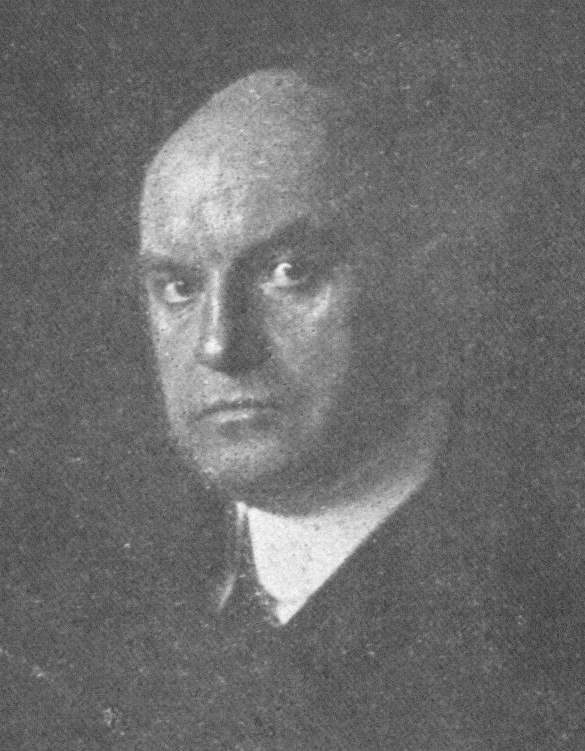
Albert Heine

Albert Heine (16 November 1867, in Braunschweig – 13 April 1949, in Westerland) was a German-Jewish stage and film actor. He also directed two silent films. He was the director of the Burgtheater in Vienna between 1918 and 1921.

== Selected filmography ==
- Don Juan (1922)
- The Curse (1924)
- Boarding House Groonen (1925)
- The Arsonists of Europe (1926)
- The Monte Cristo of Prague (1929)
- Play Around a Man (1929)
- Daughter of the Regiment (1933)

== Bibliography ==
- Jung, Uli & Schatzberg, Walter. Beyond Caligari: The Films of Robert Wiene. Berghahn Books, 1999.
