= The Life of Beethoven =

1927 film directed by Hans Otto

- Directed by: Hans Otto
- Written by: Emil Kolberg
- Starring: Fritz Kortner
- Cinematography: Viktor Gluck
- Music by: Max Hellmann
- Production company: Allianz-Film
- Release date: 18 February 1927
- Country: Austria
- Languages: Silent; German intertitles

The Life of Beethoven (German: Das Leben des Beethoven) is a 1927 Austrian silent drama film directed by Hans Otto and starring Fritz Kortner, Heinz Altringen and Ernst Baumeister.

== Cast ==
- Fritz Kortner as Ludwig van Beethoven
- Heinz Altringen
- Ernst Baumeister
- Dely Drexler
- Lilian Gray
- Willy Schmieder

== Bibliography ==
- Jeongwon Joe & Sander L. Gilman. Wagner and Cinema. Indiana University Press, 2010.
