= Ash Wednesday (1921 film) =

1921 film directed by Otto Rippert

- Directed by: Otto Rippert
- Written by: Johannes Brandt; Wilhelm Hauff
- Starring: Hella Moja; Ernst Winar; Rudolf Lettinger
- Cinematography: Max Lutze
- Production companies: Hella Moja-Film; Terra Film
- Distributed by: Terra Film
- Release date: 30 January 1921
- Running time: 60 minutes
- Country: Germany
- Languages: Silent; German intertitles

Ash Wednesday (German: Aschermittwoch) is a 1921 German silent drama film directed by Otto Rippert and starring Hella Moja, Ernst Winar and Rudolf Lettinger.

== Cast ==
- Hella Moja
- Ernst Winar
- Rudolf Lettinger
- Carl Bayer
- Paul Otto
- Magnus Stifter
- Dora Bergner
- Emil Heyse

== Bibliography ==
- Grange, William (2008). Cultural Chronicle of the Weimar Republic. Lanham, MD: Scarecrow Press. ISBN 978-0-8108-5967-8.
