= Madame Dares an Escapade =

1927 film directed by Hans Otto

- Livio Pavanelli and Betty Bird
- Directed by: Hans Otto
- Written by: Hans Otto
- Starring: Xenia Desni; Livio Pavanelli; Carmen Cartellieri
- Cinematography: Walter Weiße
- Production company: Domo-Strauß-Film
- Distributed by: Domo-Strauß-Film
- Release date: June 1927
- Country: Germany
- Languages: Silent; German intertitles

Madame Dares an Escapade (German: Madame wagt einen Seitensprung) is a 1927 German silent film directed by Hans Otto and starring Xenia Desni, Livio Pavanelli and Carmen Cartellieri. It was shot in Vienna.

== Cast ==
- Xenia Desni as Frau Claire
- Livio Pavanelli as Herr Anatol Huber
- Hermann Thimig as Fred - His Friend
- Betty Bird as Pia - Anatol's Girlfriend
- Carmen Cartellieri as Lo - Fred's Girlfriend
- Hans Moser as Train passenger

== Bibliography ==
- Bock, Hans-Michael; Bergfelder, Tim, eds. (2009). The Concise CineGraph. Encyclopedia of German Cinema. Berghahn Books. ISBN 978-1-57181-655-9.
