= The Love Market =

1930 German film

- Directed by: Heinz Paul
- Written by: Hella Moja
- Starring: Jean Murat; Erna Morena; Renée Héribel
- Cinematography: Gustave Preiss
- Production company: Cinema-Film-Vertriebs
- Distributed by: Süd-Film
- Release date: 5 March 1930
- Country: Germany
- Languages: Silent; German intertitles

The Love Market (German: Der Liebesmarkt) is a 1930 German silent film directed by Heinz Paul and starring Jean Murat, Erna Morena, and Renée Héribel.

The film's sets were designed by the art director Gustav A. Knauer and Willy Schiller.

== Cast ==
- Jean Murat
- Erna Morena
- Fritz Beckmann
- Ernst Behmer
- Gaston Briese
- Renée Héribel
- Georgia Lind
- Albert Paulig

== Bibliography ==
- Kasten, Jürgen; Bruns, Brigitte (2005). Erna Morena. Munich: Belleville. ISBN 978-3-936298-52-9.
