= Julia Janssen =

German actress

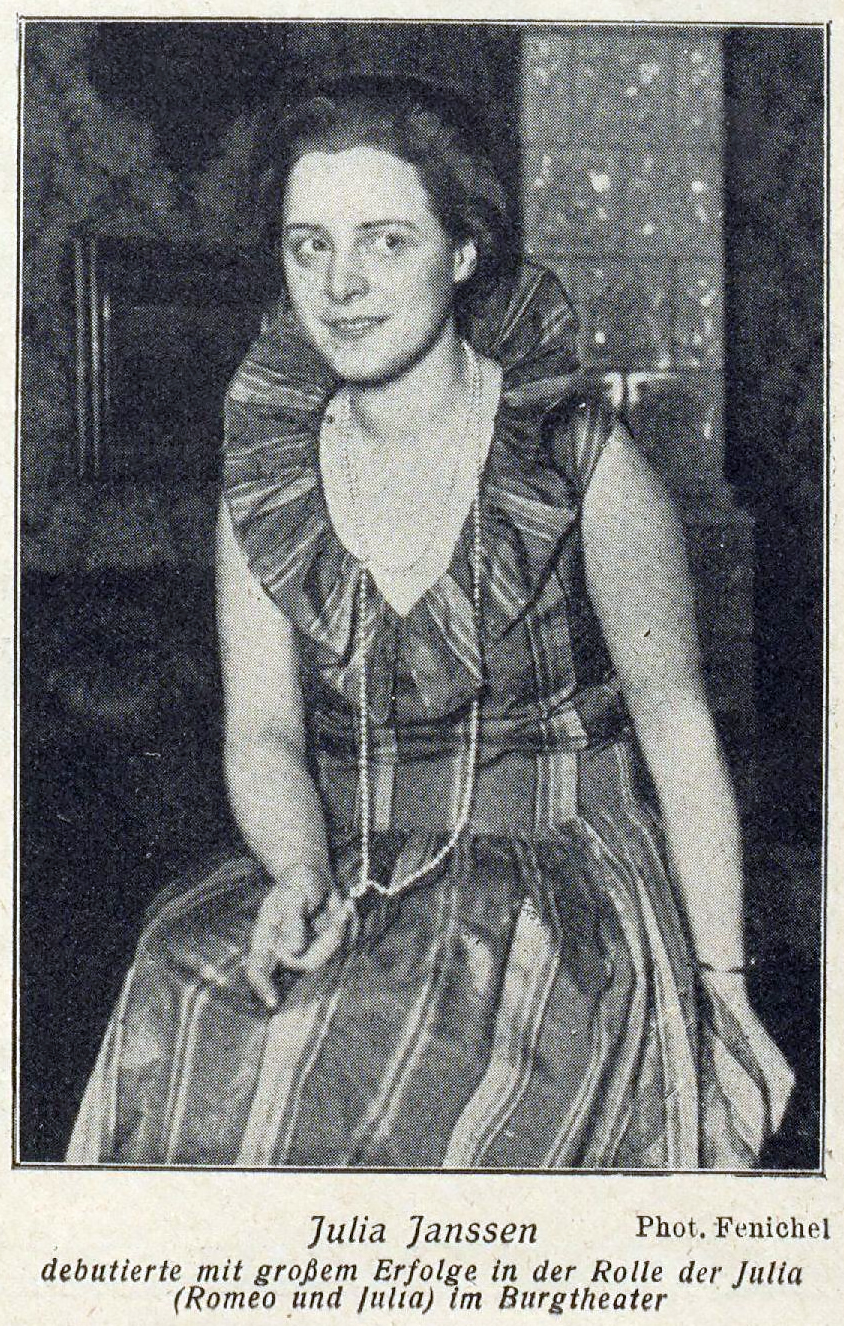
- Julia Janssen (1927)
- Born: 19 December 1900; Dortmund, North Rhine-Westphalia, German Empire
- Died: 24 December 1982 (aged 82); Herdecke, North Rhine-Westphalia, West Germany
- Occupation: Actress
- Years active: 1928–1967 (film & TV)

Julia Janssen (1900–1982) was a German stage actress. She also appeared in several films.

== Selected filmography ==
- The Woman of Yesterday and Tomorrow (1928)
- Heaven on Earth (1935)
- William Tell (1956)

== Bibliography ==
- von Dassanowsky, Robert. Austrian Cinema: A History. McFarland, 2005.
