= Fiat Lux (film) =

1923 film

- Directed by: Wilhelm Thiele
- Written by: Wilhelm Thiele
- Produced by: Emil Leyde
- Starring: Hella Moja; Carmen Cartellieri; Liese Leyde
- Production company: Leyde-Film
- Release date: 27 September 1923
- Country: Austria
- Languages: Silent; German intertitles

Fiat Lux is a 1923 Austrian silent film directed by Wilhelm Thiele and starring Hella Moja, Carmen Cartellieri and Liese Leyde.

== Cast ==
- Hella Moja as Blinde
- Carmen Cartellieri as Tochter des Ingenieurs
- Liese Leyde
- J.W. Steinbeck
- Jacob Feldhammer

== Bibliography ==
Robert von Dassanowsky. Austrian Cinema: A History. McFarland, 2005.
