= Felicitas Grolandin =

1923 film

- Directed by: Rudolf Biebrach
- Written by: Johannes Brandt
- Starring: Hella Moja; Hans Marr; Theodor Becker
- Cinematography: Julius Balting
- Production company: Hella Moja-Film
- Release date: 19 February 1923
- Country: Germany
- Languages: Silent; German intertitles

Felicitas Grolandin is a 1923 German silent film directed by Rudolf Biebrach and starring Hella Moja, Hans Marr and Theodor Becker.

The film's sets were designed by the art director Gustav A. Knauer. Location shooting took place in Bamberg in Bavaria.

== Cast ==
- Hella Moja
- Hans Marr
- Theodor Becker
- Rudolf Biebrach
- Hans Karl Georg
- Fritz Richard
- Kurt Vespermann
- Margit von Banlaky
- Leopold von Ledebur
- Carl Zickner

== Bibliography ==
- Alfred Krautz. International directory of cinematographers, set- and costume designers in film, Volume 4. Saur, 1984.
