= The Four Musketeers (1934 film) =

1934 German drama film

- Directed by: Heinz Paul
- Written by: Siegmund Graff (play); Hella Moja; Heinz Paul
- Produced by: Heinz Paul
- Starring: Fritz Kampers; Paul Westermeier; Erhard Siedel
- Cinematography: Bruno Timm
- Edited by: Paul May
- Music by: Herbert Windt
- Production company: Terra Film
- Distributed by: Terra Film
- Release date: 27 April 1934
- Running time: 119 minutes
- Country: Germany
- Language: German

The Four Musketeers (German: Die vier Musketiere) is a 1934 German drama film directed by Heinz Paul and starring Fritz Kampers, Paul Westermeier and Erhard Siedel. It was shot at the Terra Studios in Berlin. The film's art direction was by Robert A. Dietrich.

== Synopsis ==
Four comrades of the First World War meet up many years later and discover they have very different views on the political future of Germany.

== Cast ==
- Fritz Kampers as Musketier Schlumberger aus Bayern
- Paul Westermeier as Musketier Stempel aus Berlin
- Erhard Siedel as Musketier Krause aus Sachsen
- Hans Brausewetter as Musketier Gisevius aus Hamburg
- Hermann Speelmans as Gefreiter Eberle
- Werner Schott as Hauptmann der Kompanie
- Fritz Odemar as Ortskommandant
- Friedrich Ettel as Feldwebel Hülsebeck
- Liselotte Schaak as Hildegard Gievius
- Agnes Straub as Frau Schlumberger
- Martha Ziegler as Fräulein Meyer
- Carsta Löck as Minna
- Arthur Reinhardt as Kompanie-Feldwebel
- Gustav Püttjer as Kommandantur-Ordonanz
- Hans Albin as Ein Leutnant
- Ernst Behmer as Ein Hotelportier
- Renée Burzat as Eine Französin
- Peter Erkelenz as Divisionsadjutant
- Käthe Haack as Frau Krause
- Willy Mendau as Ordonanzoffizier Schmidt
- Leo Peukert as Proviantamts-Inspektor

== Bibliography ==
- Waldman, Harry (2008). Nazi Films in America, 1933–1942. McFarland. ISBN 978-0-7864-3861-7.
