= Anton Edthofer =

Austrian actor

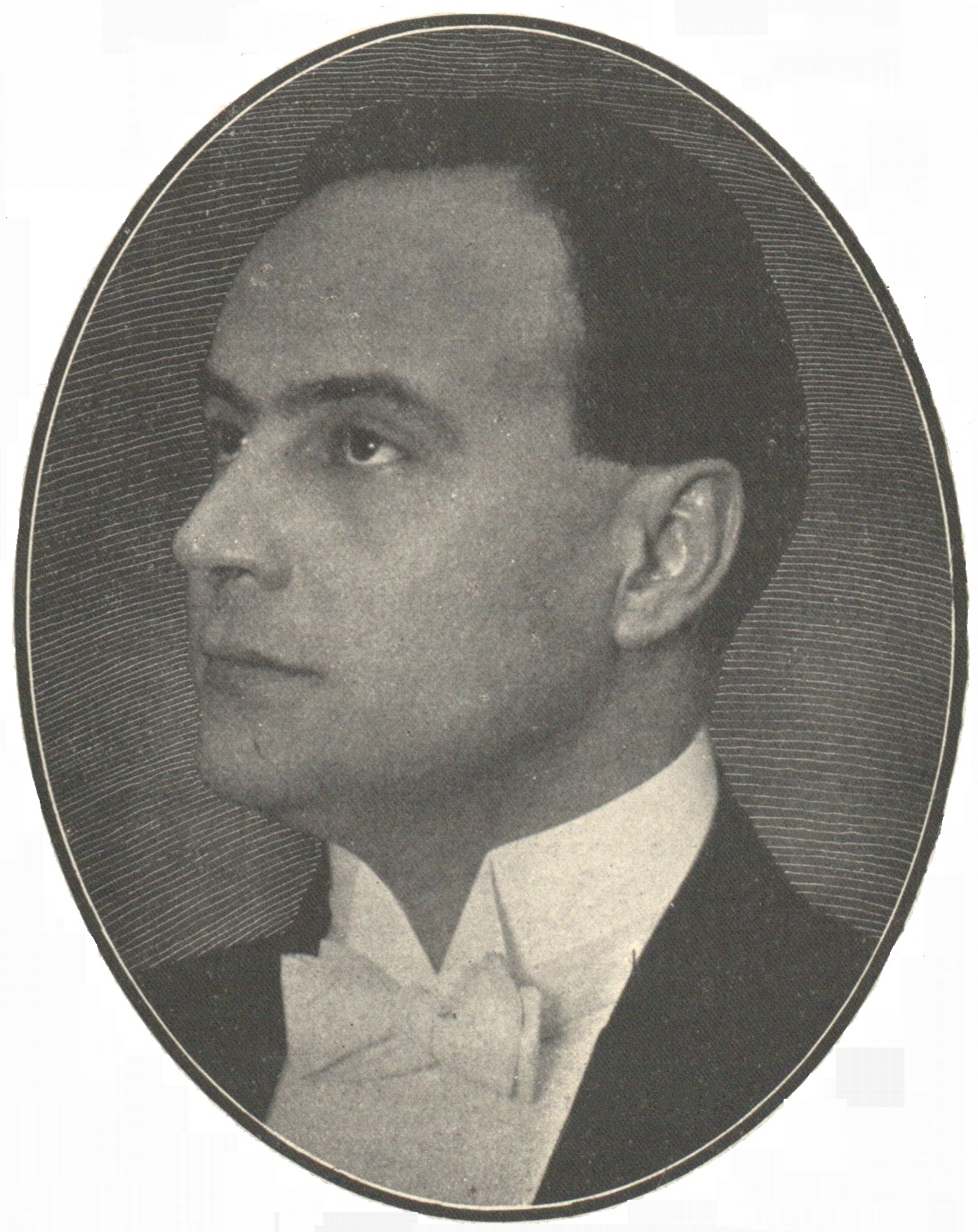
Anton Edthofer (1883–1971), Austrian actor

Anton Franz Edthofer (18 September 1883 – 21 February 1971) was an Austrian actor. He married Helene Thimig on 4 December 1948 and they remained married until his death.

== Partial filmography ==
- The Sacrifice (1918)
- Freier Dienst (1918) – Landovsky
- Maria Magdalena (1919)
- The Eyes of the World (1920) – Heinz Kay
- Moj (1920) – Josef Tschamberl
- The Secret of Bombay (1921) – Schiffsarzt Vittorio
- Four Around a Woman (1921) – Werner Krafft – William Krafft sein Zwillingsbruder
- The Love Corridor (1921) – Graf Troll
- Eine Frau mit Vergangenheit (1921)
- Hazard (1921) – Ihr Bruder, der Gentleman Dieb
- Playing with Fire (1921)
- The Oath of Stephan Huller (1921) – Friedrich Huller
- Father Won't Allow It (1921) – Toni Biebelhuber
- Barmaid (1922) – Dr. Harry Dorn
- Countess Walewska (1922) – Graf D'Evians, zeitweiliger Adjutant
- Insulted and Humiliated (1922)
- Shadows of the Past (1922) – Jens Holmberg – Artist
- Phantom (1922) – Wigottschinski
- Nora (1923) – Dr. Rank
- Fridericus Rex – 3. Teil: Sanssouci (1923) – Prinz Wilhelm
- The Princess Suwarin (1923) – Mniewski
- Bob und Mary (1923) – Bob
- The Street (1923) – Zuhälter
- Boarding House Groonen (1925)
- The Guardsman (1927) – Kritiker
- Die Strecke (1927) – Unterbeamter Kramer
- Artists (1928) – Der Todesfahrer Henrik Elcot
- Sensations-Prozess (1928) – Baron Gart
- The Burning Heart (1929) – Baron
- Poor as a Church Mouse (1931) – Baron Thomas von Ullrich
- Madame Bluebeard (1931) – Schiereisen
- Dreaming Lips (1932) – Peter
- Moral und Liebe (1933)
- A Precocious Girl (1934) – Dr. Lohnau
- A Woman Who Knows What She Wants (1934) – Erik Mattisson, Großindustrieller
- Pygmalion (1935) – Oberst Pickering
- Die Pompadour (1935) – Ludwig XV
- The Emperor's Candlesticks (1936) – Erzherzog Ludwig
- The Unexcused Hour (1937) – Dr. Karl Henning – Professor
- The Jumping Jack (1938) – Nikolaus Rohr
- Wie ein Dieb in der Nacht (1945)
- The Other Life (1948) – General Rissius
- The Angel with the Trumpet (1948) – Kaiser Franz Josef
- Viennese Girls (1949) – Hofrat Munk
- The Angel with the Trumpet (1950) – Emperor Franz Joseph

== Bibliography ==
- Jung, Uli & Schatzberg, Walter. Beyond Caligari: The Films of Robert Wiene. Berghahn Books, 1999.
