= Black Monday (film) =

1922 film

- Directed by: Robert A. Dietrich
- Written by: Bobby E. Lüthge
- Starring: Erich Kaiser-Titz; Hella Moja; F.W. Schröder-Schrom
- Production company: Terra Film
- Distributed by: Terra Film
- Release date: 15 February 1922
- Country: Germany
- Languages: Silent; German intertitles

Black Monday (German: Der schwarze Montag) is a 1922 German silent film directed by Robert A. Dietrich and starring Erich Kaiser-Titz, Hella Moja and F.W. Schröder-Schrom.

== Cast ==
- Erich Kaiser-Titz as Ölkönig
- Hella Moja
- F.W. Schröder-Schrom
- Ernst Rotmund
- Kurt Vespermann
- Emil Albes
- Emil Heyse
- Richard Starnburg
