= Don Juan (1922 film) =

1922 film

- Directed by: Albert Heine; Robert Land
- Written by: Willy Rath
- Starring: Hans Adalbert Schlettow; Margarete Lanner; Margit Barnay
- Cinematography: Hans Kämpfe
- Music by: Pasquale Perris
- Production company: Vera-Filmwerke
- Release date: 29 October 1922
- Country: Germany
- Languages: Silent; German intertitles

Don Juan is a 1922 German silent film directed by Albert Heine and Robert Land and starring Hans Adalbert Schlettow, Margarete Lanner, and Margit Barnay.

== Cast ==
In alphabetical order

- Vilma Aknay as Conchita
- Inez Allegri as Donna Elvira
- Margit Barnay as Prinzessin
- Julius Falkenstein as Prinz
- Willy Favart as Don Diego
- Julius Kobler as Notar
- Margarete Lanner as Donna Anna
- Emil Mamelok as Comtur
- Gert Sascha as Hofmarschall
- Hans Hermann Schaufuß as Leporello
- Hans Adalbert Schlettow as Don Juan
- Emil Stettner as Hofmeister
- Arthur Wellin as Pfarrer

== Bibliography ==
- Bock, Hans-Michael; Bergfelder, Tim, eds. (2009). The Concise Cinegraph: Encyclopaedia of German Cinema. New York: Berghahn Books. ISBN 978-1-57181-655-9.
