= The Missing Wife =

1929 film

- Directed by: Karl Leiter
- Written by: Max Dürr (novel); Franz Pollak; Karl Leiter
- Starring: Harry Halm; Iris Arlan; Mary Kid
- Cinematography: Eduard von Borsody
- Production company: Österreichische Film
- Distributed by: Hegewald Film (Germany)
- Release date: 23 January 1929
- Running time: 100 minutes
- Country: Austria
- Languages: Silent; German intertitles

The Missing Wife (German: Die verschwundene Frau) is a 1929 Austrian silent film comedy crime film directed by Karl Leiter and starring Harry Halm, Iris Arlan and Mary Kid. The sets were designed by the art director Hans Ledersteger. It was subject to a 1937 sound film remake of the same title.

The film is notable for marking the screen debut of Peter Lorre. The film was believed lost until 1984. It was not until it was restored in 1996 that Lorre's small role was noted. Lorre had never spoken about the film and always maintained that M (1931) was his first film, which was a breakthrough role as opposed to a brief, uncredited cameo.

== Cast ==
- Harry Halm as Adam Bertram
- Iris Arlan as Eva
- Mary Kid as Dr. Med. Hanna Karsten
- Peter C. Leska as Dr. Fritz Steiner
- Reinhold Häussermann as Polizeirat Alois Hartl
- Richard Waldemar as Tobias Ameisel
- Albert Kersten
- Clementine Plessner
- Peter Lorre as Patient of a Dentist

== Bibliography ==
- Youngkin, Stephen. The Lost One: A Life of Peter Lorre. University Press of Kentucky, 2005.
