= Marriage in Name Only =

1930 film

- Directed by: Heinz Paul
- Written by: Hella Moja; Alfred Schirokauer
- Produced by: Arthur Haase
- Starring: Evelyn Holt; Erika Dannhoff; Wolfgang Zilzer
- Cinematography: Viktor Gluck
- Music by: Erik Bergson; Fritz Hemman
- Production company: Haase-Filmproduktion
- Distributed by: Haase-Filmverleih
- Release date: 2 December 1930
- Running time: 89 minutes
- Country: Germany
- Language: German

Marriage in Name Only (German: Namensheirat) is a 1930 German drama film directed by Heinz Paul and starring Evelyn Holt, Erika Dannhoff, and Wolfgang Zilzer.

The film's sets were designed by Robert A. Dietrich.

== Cast ==
- Evelyn Holt as Eva Helmer
- Erika Dannhoff as Erika, ihre Freundin
- Wolfgang Zilzer as Max Benken
- Annemarie Hase as Rosa Schulz
- Walter Rilla as Baron Hans v. Velten
- Oskar Marion as Haberland, sein Freund
- Grit Haid as dessen Frau
- Ida Wüst as Frau Margarete Kühleborn
- Hans Mierendorff as Gen.-Dir. Niedergesäß
- Valerie Boothby as Seine Freundin Olga
- Hermine Sterler as Hanna v. Späth, Schwester Veltens
- Anna Müller-Lincke as Frau Lebrecht
- Else Reval
- Eva Speyer
- Petta Frederik
- Ernst Behmer
- Hermann Böttcher
- Ernst Pröckl
- Ernst Rückert as Ein Journalist
- Hans Sternberg
- Otto Reinwald
- Robert Thiem
- Franz Stein
- Willy Kaiser-Heyl
- Curt Cappi
- Raymund Geßler as Stimmungssänger

== Bibliography ==
- Bock, Hans-Michael; Bergfelder, Tim, eds. (2009). The Concise Cinegraph: Encyclopaedia of German Cinema. New York: Berghahn Books. ISBN 978-1-57181-655-9.
