= Otto Hartmann (actor) =

Austrian actor (1904–1994)

- Born: 22 January 1904; Vienna, Austro-Hungarian Empire
- Died: 14 March 1994 (aged 90); Vienna, Austria
- Occupation: Actor
- Years active: 1927–1943 (film)

Otto Hartmann (20 January 1904 – 14 March 1994) was an Austrian stage and film actor. Following Austria's incorporation into Nazi Germany, Hartmann acted as an informer for the authorities (Gestapo). After the Second World War, he was imprisoned for his wartime activities.

== Selected filmography ==
- Bright Eyes (1929)
- Father Radetzky (1929)
- Madame Bluebeard (1931)
- The Case of Colonel Redl (1931)
- The Hymn of Leuthen (1933)
- Our Emperor (1933)
- Suburban Cabaret (1935)
- Asew (1935)
- Court Theatre (1936)
- The White Dream (1943)

== During the war ==
Hartmann was a member of the Österreichische Freiheitsbewegung (Austrian freedom movement, a nonviolent conservative catholic resistance group), whose goal was the liberation from National Socialism and the detachment of Austria from the German Reich. He collected Information about this group and other resistance groups and assembled lists of their members. He gave this information to the Gestapo, leading to the arrest of 450 members of the resistance movement, some of which were subsequently sentenced to death, others to long terms in prison.

== After the war ==
As Vienna was conquered by the Russian Red Army, in spring 1945, Hartmann, with about 200 other Gestapo informants, traveled from Vienna to Innsbruck to hide from the authorities. Through contacts with the Austrian resistance, he got a job at the police, but was arrested by the French occupation forces in September 1945, who handed him over to the Austrian authorities in Vienna. On 22 November 1947, Hartmann was sentenced to life in prison by the People's Court in Vienna for denunciation resulting in death.

== Pardon and future life ==
He repeatedly tried to obtain a retrial or a pardon, which was rejected in the subsequent period. Eventually, as part of an amnesty, he was pardoned in 1957 for a trial period of five years. Hartmann then worked as a seller and a clerk at various Viennese companies.

== Bibliography ==
- Thomas Weyr. The Setting of the Pearl: Vienna under Hitler. Oxford University Press, 2005.
