= Hans Androschin =

Austrian cinematographer

Hans Androschin (born Johann Androschin, 16 March 1892 in Vienna – 18 May 1976 in Vienna) was an Austrian cinematographer.

== Life and career ==
He started his career at the age of 17 as simple cinematographer in Viennese studios. During World War I, he served as soldier. Afterwards he went abroad to work for foreign film companies. When he came back to Vienna, he became chief cinematographer at Sascha-Film in Vienna. He realised well known or historically important German and Austrian films, such as the scandalous Ecstasy (1933) with Hedy Lamarr or the early horror film The Hands of Orlac (1924).

His work as cinematographer also includes Café Elektric (1927) with the first main roles of the German movie star Marlene Dietrich and the later important Austrian actor and director Willi Forst.

In 1928, Androschin moved to Poland, where he worked as Hans Andruszin in studios of Warsaw and Bydgoszcz. With the beginning of sound films, Androschin focussed on documentary films. After Germany occupied Austria in 1938, he became sound master of the film department of the Wehrmacht. After World War II, he worked again as cinematographer of documentary films about the Austrian nature and culture.

== Selected filmography ==
- Zwischen 12 und 1 (1920)
- Brennendes Land (1921)
- Gevatter Tod (1921)
- Das Weib des Irren (1921)
- The Venus (1922)
- William Ratcliff (1922)
- The Ghost of Morton's Castle (1922)
- The Marquise of Clermont (1922)
- Pflicht und Ehre (1923)
- The Hands of Orlac (1924)
- Boarding House Groonen (1925)
- The Guardsman (1925)
- The Queen of Moulin Rouge (1926)
- Der Rosenkavalier (1926)
- Café Elektric (1927)
- Glück bei Frauen (1928)
- Scampolo (1932)
- Madame Wants No Children (1933)
- Ecstasy (1933)
- Arlberg Express (1948)
- Verträumtes Niederösterreich (1952)
