= Poor as a Church Mouse =

1931 film directed by Richard Oswald

- Directed by: Richard Oswald
- Written by: Ladislas Fodor (play); Heinz Goldberg; Felix Salten
- Produced by: Emil Justitz
- Starring: Grete Mosheim; Anton Edthofer; Hans Thimig; Paul Hörbiger
- Cinematography: Robert Lach
- Music by: Ralph Benatzky
- Production company: Richard-Oswald-Produktion
- Distributed by: Deutsche Lichtspiel-Syndikat
- Release date: 5 November 1931
- Running time: 101 minutes
- Country: Germany
- Language: German

Poor as a Church Mouse (German: Arm wie eine Kirchenmaus) is a 1931 German musical comedy film directed by Richard Oswald and starring Grete Mosheim, Anton Edthofer and Hans Thimig. It was based on the 1928 play A templom egere by Ladislas Fodor, which has been turned into several films including the 1934 British comedy The Church Mouse. The film's art direction was overseen by Franz Schroedter. It premiered at the Gloria-Palast in Berlin.

== Cast ==
- Grete Mosheim as Susi Sachs
- Anton Edthofer as Baron Thomas von Ullrich
- Hans Thimig as Frany, der Barons Sohn
- Paul Hörbiger as Count Friedrich Thalheim
- Fritz Grünbaum as Schünzl
- Paul Morgan as Quapil
- Charlotte Ander as Olly Frey, Sekretärin
- Trude Hesterberg
- Senta Söneland
- Rina Marsa
- Ernst Wurmser
- Arthur Mainzer
- Monsieur Thonny
- Gerd Oswald

== Production and reception ==
In that production, "Oswald emphasized the importance of sustaining the source text while applying the laws of films" according to Christiane Schönfield.

The film was noted for the scene in "which includes performances of the film's title song in which lengthy moving camera shots show multiple actors who sing in traversing large sets."

== Bibliography ==
- Kasten, Jürgen; Loacker, Armin, eds. (2005). Richard Oswald: Kino zwischen Spektakel, Aufklärung und Unterhaltung. Vienna: Verlag Filmarchiv Austria. ISBN 978-3-901932-68-7.
