= Heinz Paul =

German screenwriter, film producer and director

Heinz Paul (13 August 1893 – 14 March 1983) was a German screenwriter, film producer and director. His speciality was military film; he also filmed various pseudo-documentaries. He was married to the actress Hella Moja.

== Selected filmography ==
=== Director ===
- The Street of Forgetting (1923)
- The Dice Game of Life (1925)
- Department Store Princess (1926)
- U-9 Weddigen (1927)
- The False Prince (1927)
- The Carousel of Death (1928)
- The Woman of Yesterday and Tomorrow (1928)
- The Midnight Waltz (1929)
- Marriage in Name Only (1930)
- The Love Market (1930)
- Namensheirat (1930)
- Student Life in Merry Springtime (1931)
- The Other Side (1931)
- Circus Life (1931)
- Tannenberg (1932)
- Trenck (1932)
- Marschall Vorwärts (1932)
- William Tell (1934)
- The Four Musketeers (1934)
- Miracle of Flight (1935)
- Immortal Melodies (1935)
- Paul and Pauline (1936)
- Hilde and the Volkswagen (1936)
- Comrades at Sea (1938)
- Come Back to Me (1944)
- Good Fortune in Ohio (1950)
- Operation Edelweiss (1954)
- Marriages Forbidden (1957)
- The Elephant in a China Shop (1958)
- Hula-Hopp, Conny (1959)
- Oriental Nights (1960)

=== Producer ===
- The Castle in the South (1933)

=== Screenwriter ===
- Countess Walewska (1920)

== Bibliography ==
- Kester, Bernadette. Film Front Weimar: Representations of the First World War in German films of the Weimar Period (1919-1933). Amsterdam University Press, 2003.
