= List of films set in Rome =

Over the past century, there have been numerous films set in Rome, and the city has a particularly strong cinematic tradition. The city hosts the Cinecittà Studios, the largest film and television production facility in continental Europe and the centre of the Italian cinema, where a large number of today's biggest box office hits are filmed. The 99-acre (40-ha) studio complex is 5.6 miles (9 km) from the centre of Rome and is part of one of the biggest production communities in the world, second only to Hollywood.

== List of films ==
- 20 Million Miles to Earth (1957)
- All Roads Lead to Rome (2015)
- Angels & Demons (2009)
- The Belly of an Architect (1987)
- Bicycle Thieves (1948)
- A Cat in the Brain (1990)
- Coins in the Fountain (1990)
- The Core (2003)
- The Da Vinci Code (2006)
- La Dolce Vita (1960)
- Double Team (1997)
- Eat Pray Love (2010)
- L'eclisse (1962)
- EuroTrip (2004)
- The First Omen (2024)
- Gidget Goes to Rome (1963)
- The Girl Who Knew Too Much (1963)
- Godzilla x Kong: The New Empire (2024)
- The Great Beauty (2013)
- Hudson Hawk (1991)
- L'immensità (2022)
- John Wick: Chapter 2 (2017)
- John Wick: Chapter 3 – Parabellum (2019)
- Jumper (2008)
- Light in the Piazza (1962)
- Love Live! The School Idol Movie: Over the Rainbow
- The Lizzie McGuire Movie (2003)
- Madagascar 3: Europe's Most Wanted (2012)
- The Man from U.N.C.L.E (2015)
- Megiddo: The Omega Code 2 (2001)
- Mignon Has Come to Stay (1988)
- Mission: Impossible III (2006)
- Nine (2009)
- Ocean's Twelve (2004)
- Only You (1994)
- The Omega Code (1999)
- The Omen (2006)
- The Pink Panther 2 (2009)
- The Pope Must Die (1991)
- Roma (1972)
- Roman Holiday (1953)
- The Roman Spring of Mrs. Stone (1961)
- The Roman Spring of Mrs. Stone (2003)
- Rome 11:00 (1952)
- Rome Adventure (1962)
- Rome, Open City (1945)
- Rome Tram
- Room in Rome (2010)
- Sabrina Goes to Rome (1998)
- Scooby-Doo and the Cyber Chase (2001)
- Shooting the Moon (1998)
- Spectre (2015)
- The Talented Mr. Ripley (1999)
- Terminal Station (1953)
- There's Still Tomorrow (2023)
- Three Coins in the Fountain (1954)
- Three Girls from Rome (1952)
- Three Strangers in Rome (1958)
- The Tiger and the Snow (2005)
- To Rome with Love (2012)
- Umberto D. (1952)
- Way of the Dragon (1972)
- When in Rome (1952)
- When in Rome (2002)
- When in Rome (2010)
- Zoolander 2 (2016)
