= Hella Moja =

German screenwriter, film producer and actress

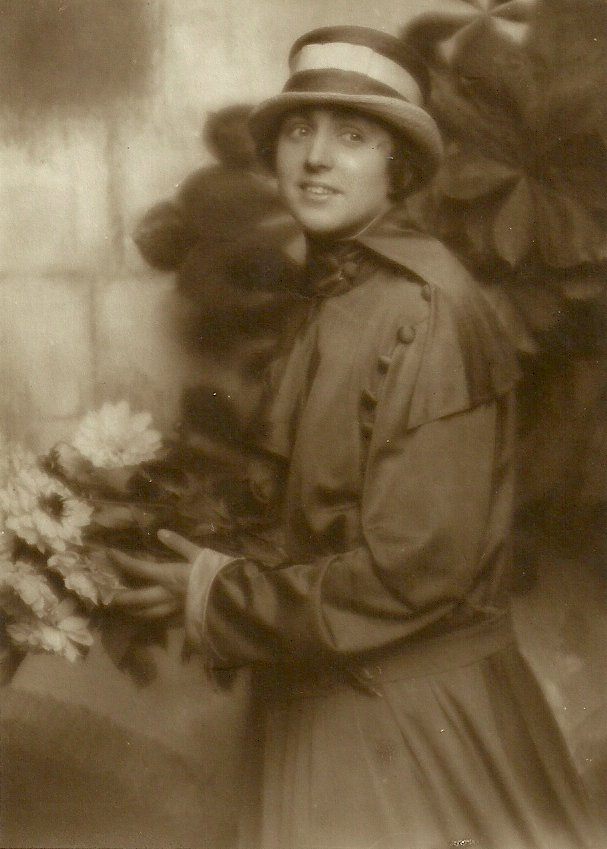
- Born: Helene Gertrud Schwerdtfeger; 18 January 1896; Cienin Zaborny, Posen, German Empire
- Died: December 1951 (aged 55); Kiel, Schleswig-Holstein, West Germany
- Other names: Helene Morawsky; Helene Gertrud Moyzysczyck; Helene Gertrud Paluckowski; Helka Moroff; Elka Moroff; Hella Sewa
- Occupations: Actress, writer, producer
- Years active: 1913–1938
- Spouses: Erich Morawsky (divorced): Heinz Paul

Hella Moja (born Helene Gertrud Schwerdtfeger; 18 January 1896 – December 1951) was a German screenwriter, film producer and film actress. She was married to the director Heinz Paul.

== Biography ==
Hella Moja was born Helene Gertrud Schwerdtfeger on 18 January 1896. Some sources list her birthdate as 2 February 1890.

Early in her career, Moja appeared at the Teatr Artystyczny in Warsaw. After both of her parents died, she worked as a translator for Polish and Russian, and as a writer for the Deutsche Presse-Korrespondenz in Hannover, the Ullstein-Verlag, and the Scherl-Verlag.

Moja began taking acting lessons with Emmanuel Reicher and Frida Richard and made her debut in 1913 at the Lessing Theater in Berlin. Alwin Neuß took notice of Moja, and she made her film debut in The White Rose (1915). Some of her early film appearances include The Path of Tears (1916), The Oath of Renate Rabenau (1917), The Stranger (1917), and The Enchanted Castle (1918). In 1918, Moja founded her own film company, Hella Moja Filmgesellschaft, which would produce 16 films. Her first production was Wondrous is the Fairy Tale of Love (1918) with Ernst Hofmann, for which critics praised her acting.

In the 1920s, Moja starred in films such as Countess Walewska (1920), directed by Otto Rippert, What a Girl (1920), Felicitas Grolandin (1923), Department Store Princess (1926), U-9 Weddigen (1927), and The Carousel of Death (1928).

In addition to acting and producing, she is credited with writing 13 films, including Department Store Princess (1926), The False Prince (1927), Three Days of Life and Death (1929), The Other Side (1931), and the Nazi propaganda film The Four Musketeers (1934), all of which her husband Heinz Paul directed.

Moja only appeared in seven films in the 1930s, making her final screen appearance in Comrades at Sea (1938). In 1938, she was expelled from the Reichsfilmkammer on the grounds that she was only a part-time screenwriter.

Moja legally changed her name to Helka Moroff in 1934, to Elka Moroff in 1937, and to Hella Sewa in 1942. She worked as a prompter at Theater Kiel from 1942 until her death in 1951.

Moja committed suicide in December 1951, although a newspaper reported her death in 1937, and some sources list her death date as 15 January 1937. She was buried at Friedhof Heerstraße, but her tomb was later leveled.

== Selected filmography ==
- The Dancer from Tanagra (1920)
- Countess Walewska (1920)
- What a Girl (1920)
- Ash Wednesday (1921)
- Black Monday (1922)
- The Beautiful Girl (1923)
- Fiat Lux (1923)
- Felicitas Grolandin (1923)
- The Man at Midnight (1924)
- The Dice Game of Life (1925)
- Department Store Princess (1926)
- The False Prince (1927)
- U-9 Weddigen (1927)
- The Carousel of Death (1928)
- Marriage in Name Only (1930)
- The Love Market (1930)
- The Other Side (1931)
- Student Life in Merry Springtime (1931)
- Marshal Forwards (1932)
- The Four Musketeers (1934)
- Immortal Melodies (1935)
- Comrades at Sea (1938)

== Bibliography ==
- Giesen, Rolf (2003). Nazi Propaganda Films: A History and Filmography. Jefferson, NC: McFarland. ISBN 978-0-7864-3870-9.
- Kester, Bernadette (2003). Film Front Weimar: Representations of the First World War in German films of the Weimar Period (1919–1933). Amsterdam: Amsterdam University Press. ISBN 978-90-5356-598-8.
