= Der Rosenkavalier (1926 film) =

1926 film directed by Robert Wiene

- Directed by: Robert Wiene
- Written by: Richard Strauss (opera) and Hugo von Hofmannsthal; Ludwig Nerz; Robert Wiene
- Produced by: Robert Wiene
- Starring: Michael Bohnen; Huguette Duflos; Paul Hartmann; Jaque Catelain
- Cinematography: Hans Androschin; Ludwig Schaschek; Hans Theyer
- Production company: Pan Film
- Distributed by: Filmhaus Bruckmann
- Release date: 10 January 1926
- Country: Austria
- Languages: Silent; German intertitles

Der Rosenkavalier is a 1926 Austrian silent film of the opera of the same name by Richard Strauss (music) and Hugo von Hofmannsthal (libretto). Directed by Robert Wiene, it premiered on 10 January 1926 at the Dresden Semperoper, which had also hosted the actual opera's premiere 15 years earlier. Hofmannsthal considerably changed the storyline for the film version (which included a final scene in the formal gardens behind the Field Marshal's residence) and Strauss' score included music not only from the opera but also sections of his Couperin Suite and a march for the Field Marshal, who appears in this version.

The film was shot at the Schönbrunn Studios in Vienna. The music during the film's performances was provided by an orchestra. At the premiere, this was conducted by Richard Strauss himself. The film's projection speed had to be adjusted by the projector in order to fit the speed of the orchestra. This task fell to the film's cameraman, Hans Androschin, because only he knew the exact length of each scene and cut. In later performances, a special recording, also conducted by Strauss, provided the music. Strauss conducted the Vienna and London premieres (and recorded excerpts from the film score on the Victrola label at that time. A planned tour of the United States in 1927 by Strauss and his orchestra failed to go ahead because of the emergence of sound films.

The American premiere took place at Yale University's Woolsey Hall with the Yale Symphony Orchestra conducted by John Mauceri (who received special permission from Strauss' son) on 29 March 1974. A copy of the film was found in the Czech National Archive and Mauceri translated the titles with Glenn Most into English. The final sequence was missing from the print and was performed with orchestral music and titles alone. The score and parts were held by the Library of Congress. The audience at Yale included the famed Strauss soprano Maria Jeritza, who was living in New Jersey at the time.

== Cast ==
- Michael Bohnen as Ochs von Lerchenau
- Huguette Duflos as Marschallin
- Paul Hartmann as Marschall
- Jaque Catelain as Octavian
- Elly Felicie Berger as Sophie
- Carmen Cartellieri as Annina
- Karl Forest as Herr von Faninal
- Friedrich Feher as Valzacchi

== Bibliography ==
- Jung, Uli & Schatzberg, Walter. Beyond Caligari: The Films of Robert Wiene. Berghahn Books, 1999.
