= Karl Leiter =

- Occupations: screenwriter; Film director

Karl Leiter (1890-1957) was an Austrian screenwriter and film director.

== Selected filmography ==
- Queen Draga (1920)
- Pratermizzi (1927)
- Father Radetzky (1929)
- The Missing Wife (1929)
- Das Ferienkind (1943)
- Ich bitte um Vollmacht (1944)
- The Fall of Valentin (1951)
- Emperor's Ball (1956)
- Wiener Luft (1958)
