= The White Paradise =

1929 film

- Directed by: Max Neufeld
- Written by: Erwin Rainer; Louis Rokos
- Produced by: Hugo Engel
- Cinematography: Ludwig Schaschek; Artur von Schwertführer
- Production company: Max Neufeld-Film
- Distributed by: Hugo Engel-Filmgesellschaft
- Release date: 16 May 1929
- Country: Austria
- Languages: Silent; German intertitles

The White Paradise (German: Das weisse Paradies) is a 1929 Austrian silent film directed by Max Neufeld and starring Fred Doederlein, Hilde Jennings and Hans Marr.

The film's sets were designed by the art director Artur Berger.

== Cast ==
- Fred Doederlein as Kurt Bergen - Skilehrer
- Hilde Jennings as Inge
- Hans Marr as Kommerzialrat Krüger, ihr Vater
- Illa Meery as Lucy Erskine
- Hans Thimig as Donald Evans
- Peter C. Leska as Olaf Hardt
- Eugen Neufeld as John Bird
- Clementine Plessner as Kramer-Resi

== Bibliography ==
- Armin Loacker. Kunst der Routine: der Schauspieler und Regisseur Max Neufeld. Filmarchiv Austria, 2008.
