= Hans Ziegler (actor) =

Austrian actor

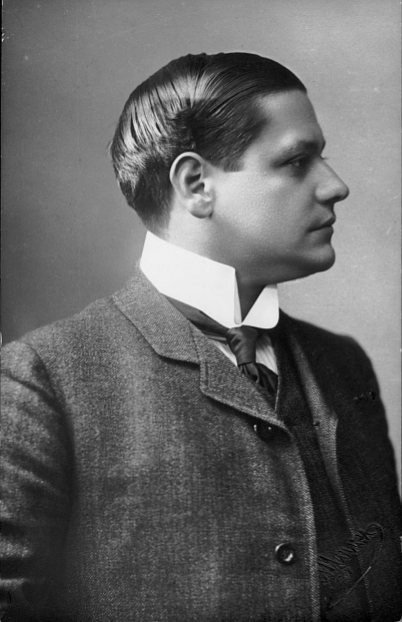
- Born: 9 May 1879; Karlsruhe, German Empire
- Died: 24 December 1961 (aged 82); Vienna, Austria
- Occupation: Actor
- Years active: 1922-1963 (film & TV)

Hans Ziegler (1879–1961) was a German-born Austrian stage director and stage actor. He also acted in around a dozen films spread out through his long career.

== Selected filmography ==
- A Waltz by Strauss (1925)
- The Other Life (1948)
- 1. April 2000 (1952)
- Sissi – Fateful Years of an Empress (1957)

== Bibliography ==
- Ernesto G. Laura. Tutti i film di Venezia, 1932-1984. La Biennale, Settore cinema e spettacolo televisivo, 1985.
