= Grand Duchess Alexandra =

1933 film

- Directed by: Wilhelm Thiele
- Written by: Arthur Rebner; Hanns Sassmann
- Produced by: Oskar Glück
- Starring: Maria Jeritza; Paul Hartmann; Leo Slezak
- Cinematography: Otto Kanturek
- Edited by: Carl Behr
- Music by: Franz Lehár
- Production company: Projektograph Film
- Distributed by: Robert Müller GmbH
- Release date: 22 November 1933
- Running time: 102 minutes
- Country: Austria
- Language: German

Grand Duchess Alexandra (German: Großfürstin Alexandra) is a 1933 Austrian operetta film directed by Wilhelm Thiele and starring Maria Jeritza, Paul Hartmann and Leo Slezak. It is based on Franz Lehár's operetta of the same title.

The film's sets were designed by the art director Artur Berger.

== Cast ==
- Maria Jeritza as Großfürstin Alexandra
- Paul Hartmann as Großfürst Michael
- Leo Slezak as Fürst Nikolai
- Johannes Riemann as Martin Werner - Kapelmeister der Wiener Oper
- S.Z. Sakall as Dimitri, Chefkoch im Hause der Großfürstin
- Hans Marr as Großfürst Konstantin
- Hans Hübner as Fürst Schirbatoff
- Ernst Pröckl as Der rote Grenzpolizist mit Dimitri
- Inge List as Mädchen das in der Oper vorsingen will
- Alexander Netschipor as Sänger
- Johannes Roth as Der Knecht am Gut Litauen
- Wolfgang Staudte as Einer der Flüchtlinge vor den Roten
- Gisa Wurm as Die Wirtschafterin bei Kapelmeister Werner

== Bibliography ==
- Liora R. Halperin. Babel in Zion: Jews, Nationalism, and Language Diversity in Palestine, 1920-1948. Yale University Press, 2014.
