= Wilhelm Thiele =

Austrian film director (1890–1975)

- Born: May 10, 1890; Vienna, Austria
- Died: September 7, 1975 (aged 85); Woodland Hills, Los Angeles, U.S.

Wilhelm Thiele, also William Thiele (1890–1975) was an Austrian screenwriter and film director. He directed over 40 films between 1921 and 1960.

== Life and career ==
Thiele started his show career as a stage actor. He got his start in Austrian and German film during the 1920s, most often as a director of film comedies. His biggest success was the highly influential musical film The Three from the Filling Station (1930), the highest-grossing film in Germany that year. Thiele, who was of Jewish descent, left Germany during the Nazi Era.

His first film in Hollywood, Lottery Lover in 1935, was without success and Thiele never achieved the same level of fame in Hollywood as he had in Germany. He mostly made B-Pictures, but is credited with giving actress Dorothy Lamour her big start in movies with The Jungle Princess (1936). He also directed the first two RKO Tarzan films, starting in 1943.

In the 1950s, he worked as a director in American television including 26 episodes of The Lone Ranger and 36 episodes of Cavalcade of America.

His last two films, The Last Pedestrian and Sabine und die hundert Männer, were both made in Germany and released in 1960.

== Personal life ==
Wilhelm Thiele was married and had three children. His younger brother was the director Eugen Thiele.

== Partial filmography ==
- The Last Waltz King (1922)
- Fiat Lux (1923)
- Tales of Old Vienna (1923)
- Franz Lehár (1923)
- Two Children (1924)
- The Island of Dreams (1925)
- Fire of Love (1925)
- The Little Variety Star (1926)
- His Toughest Case (1926)
- Countess Ironing-Maid (1926)
- Eva and the Grasshopper (1927)
- The Csardas Princess (1927)
- His Late Excellency (1927)
- Orient Express (1927)
- Attorney for the Heart (1927)
- Hurrah! I Live! (1928)
- The Lady with the Mask (1928)
- The Model from Montparnasse (1929)
- The Three from the Filling Station (1930)
- The Road to Paradise (1930)
- Waltz of Love (1930)
- The Private Secretary (1931)
- The Typist (1931)
- The Girl and the Boy (1931)
- Two Hearts Beat as One (1932)
- Madame Makes Her Exit (1932)
- Girls to Marry (1932)
- Marry Me (1932)
- Amourous Adventure (1932)
- Grand Duchess Alexandra (1933)
- Waltz Time (1933)
- The Lottery Lover (1935)
- The Jungle Princess (1936)
- London by Night (1937)
- Bridal Suite (1939)
- Bad Little Angel (1939)
- Tarzan Triumphs (1943)
- Tarzan's Desert Mystery (1943)
- The Du Pont Story (1950)
- The Last Pedestrian (1960)
- Sabine und die 100 Männer (1960)
