= Tales of Old Vienna =

1923 film

- Directed by: Wilhelm Thiele
- Written by: Wilhelm Thiele; Hans Torre
- Starring: Grit Haid; Frieda Kiesewetter; Hugo Thimig
- Cinematography: Ludwig Schaschek
- Music by: Otto Römisch
- Production company: Thalia-Film
- Release date: 6 February 1923
- Country: Austria
- Languages: Silent; German intertitles

Tales of Old Vienna or Carl Michael Ziehrer's Tales of Old Vienna (German: Carl Michael Ziehrers Märchen aus Alt-Wien) is a 1923 Austrian silent film directed by Wilhelm Thiele and starring Grit Haid, Frieda Kiesewetter and Hugo Thimig. It is based on the life of the composer Karl Michael Ziehrer. It is a sequel to another film about Ziehrer, The Last Waltz King, that Thiele had directed the previous year.

== Cast ==
- Hans Lackner as Karl Michael Ziehrer
- Grit Haid as Donaunixe
- Hugo Thimig as Wendelin Frohgemut sen.
- Frieda Kiesewetter as Lore, seine Frau
- Hans Thimig as Wendelin Frohgemut jun.
- Anton Maria Girardi
- Harry Norbert
- Frieda Linck

== Bibliography ==
- Murphy, Robert. Directors in British and Irish Cinema: A Reference Companion. British Film Institute, 2006.
