= Louis Nerz =

Austrian screenwriter and actor

Louis Nerz (1866 in Mimoň – 1938 in Vienna) was an Austrian screenwriter and actor. He is also credited as Ludwig Nerz.

== Selected filmography ==
Screenwriter

- Das grinsende Gesicht (1921)
- The Venus (1922)
- The Marquise of Clermont (1922)
- Meriota the Dancer (1922)
- The Hell of Barballo (1923)
- The Hands of Orlac (1924)
- Pension Groonen (1925)
- Der Rosenkavalier (1926)
- Eros in Chains (1929)

== Bibliography ==
- Jung, Uli & Schatzberg, Walter. Beyond Caligari: The Films of Robert Wiene. Berghahn Books, 1999.
