= Hans Otto Löwenstein =

Austrian film director and screenwriter

- Born: 11 October 1881; Oderfurt, Moravia, Austria-Hungary
- Died: 8 May 1931 (aged 49); Vienna, First Austrian Republic
- Occupations: Director, writer
- Years active: 1913–1929

Hans Otto Löwenstein (11 October 1881 – 8 May 1931) was an Austrian film director and screenwriter of the silent era.

== Selected filmography ==
- Emperor Charles (1921)
- The Ragpicker of Paris (1922)
- Modern Marriages (1924)
- Colonel Redl (1925)
- Kissing Is No Sin (1926)
- Grandstand for General Staff (1926)
- The Life of Beethoven (1927)
- Madame Dares an Escapade (1927)
- Endangered Girls (1928)

== Bibliography ==
- Zipes, Jack. The Enchanted Screen: The Unknown History of Fairy-Tale Films. Routledge, 2011.
