= The Last Waltz King =

1922 film

- Directed by: Wilhelm Thiele
- Written by: Wilhelm Thiele
- Starring: Fritz Schroeter; Gabriele Modl; Richard Waldemar
- Production company: Ideal-Film
- Release date: 24 October 1922
- Country: Austria
- Languages: Silent; German intertitles

The Last Waltz King or Carl Michael Ziehrer, the Last Waltz King (German:Carl Michael Ziehrer, der letzte Walzerkönig) is a 1922 Austrian silent film written and directed by Wilhelm Thiele and starring Fritz Schroeter, Gabriele Modl and Richard Waldemar. It is based on the life of the nineteenth century composer Karl Michael Ziehrer. A sequel, Tales of Old Vienna, was released the following year.

== Cast ==
- Wilhelm Thiele
- Fritz Schroeter
- Gabriele Modl
- Richard Waldemar
- Franz Glawatsch
- Emil De Varney
- Karl Schöpler

== See also ==
Viennese Girls (1945/49), another film about Karl Michael Ziehrer

== Bibliography ==
- Murphy, Robert. Directors in British and Irish Cinema: A Reference Companion. British Film Institute, 2006.
