= A Waltz by Strauss (1925 film) =

1925 film directed by Max Neufeld

- German: Ein Walzer von Strauß
- Directed by: Max Neufeld
- Written by: Jacques Bachrach; Max Neufeld; Walter Reisch
- Starring: Eugen Neufeld; Tessy Harrison; Svet Petrovich
- Cinematography: József Bécsi; Eduard Hoesch; Ludwig Schaschek
- Music by: Alexander Schirmann
- Production company: Helios-Filmproduktion
- Release date: 23 October 1925
- Country: Austria
- Languages: Silent; German intertitles

A Waltz by Strauss (German: Ein Walzer von Strauß) is a 1925 Austrian silent film directed by Max Neufeld and starring Eugen Neufeld, Tessy Harrison, and Svet Petrovich.

The film's sets were designed by the art director Julius von Borsody.

== Cast ==
- Eugen Neufeld as Bankpräsident Mario Velloni
- Tessy Harrison as Elisabeth Velloni
- Svet Petrovich as Rittmeister Baron
- Max Sterenyi as Lengsfelder
- Fred Louis Lerch as Dr. Poldi Mahler
- Charlotte Ander as Lintschi Ebeseder
- Robert Valberg as Nicolaus Baransky
- Hans Ziegler as Prokurist Leiser
- Max Nekut as President of the Foreign Bank Association
- Armin Seydelmann as President of the Paris Bank Trust
- Hans Melzer as Colonel of the Reichswehr
- Anton Amon as Velloni's valet
- Ferdinand Mayerhofer as Master of the Club
- Otto Schmöle as man in a tailcoat
- Strauß Johann as Nephew
- Anita Berber as dancer
- Philipp von Zeska as Franz Schubert
- Bella Siris as dancer
- Georg Kundert
