= The Waltz King (film) =

1930 film

- Directed by: Manfred Noa
- Written by: Curt J. Braun; Bobby E. Lüthge
- Starring: Hans Stüwe; Claire Rommer; Fred Louis Lerch
- Cinematography: Willy Goldberger
- Music by: Eduard Künneke; Artur Guttmann
- Production company: Merkur-Film
- Distributed by: Deutsche First National Pictures
- Release date: 8 May 1930
- Running time: 90 minutes
- Country: Germany
- Language: German

The Waltz King (German: Der Walzerkönig) is a 1930 German historical musical drama film directed by Manfred Noa and starring Hans Stüwe, Claire Rommer and Fred Louis Lerch. It portrays the life of the nineteenth century composer Johann Strauss II. The film's sets were designed by the art director Max Heilbronner. It was distributed by the German branch of First National Pictures.

== Cast ==
- Hans Stüwe as Johann Strauß
- Claire Rommer as Jetty Treffz
- Fred Louis Lerch as Josef Strauß
- Ida Wüst as Jettys Mutter
- Victor Janson as Fürst Pawlowsky
- Ita Rina as Seine Tochter
- Henri Baudin as Baron Todesco
- Jean Golescu as Zigeunerkapelle

== Bibliography ==
- Jörg Schöning. Fantaisies russes: russische Filmmacher in Berlin und Paris, 1920–1930. Edition Text + Kritik, 1995.
