= Emperor Charles (film) =

1921 film directed by Hans Otto

- Directed by: Hans Otto
- Written by: Béla Balázs
- Produced by: Hans Otto
- Starring: Josef Staetter; Louise Seemann; Grit Haid
- Production company: Löwenstein Film
- Release date: 1921
- Country: Austria
- Languages: Silent; German intertitles

Emperor Charles (German: Kaiser Karl) is a 1921 Austrian silent film directed by Hans Otto and starring Josef Staetter, Louise Seemann, and Grit Haid. It portrays the life of Charles I of Austria, the last ruler of the Austro-Hungarian Empire.

== Cast ==
- Josef Staetter as Kaiser Karl I
- Louise Seemann
- Grit Haid

== Bibliography ==
- Von Dassanowsky, Robert (2005). Austrian Cinema: A History. Jefferson, NC: McFarland. ISBN 978-1-4766-2147-0.
