= Benno Vigny =

French-German novelist and screenwriter (1889–1965)

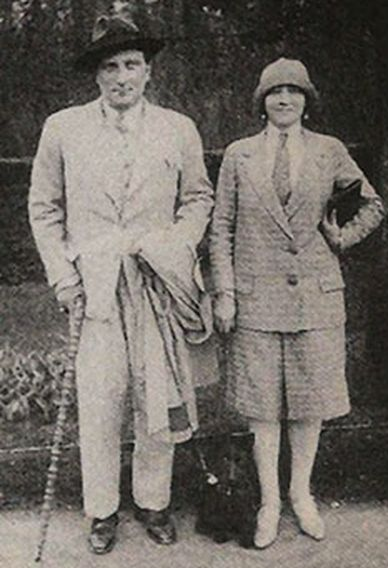
Benno Vigny and Marie-Louise Caussat in c. 1920

Benno Vigny (real name Benoit Philippe Weinfeld; 28 October 1889 – 31 October 1965) was a French-German screenwriter, novelist, songwriter, and librettist. Born into a Jewish family in France and raised in Vienna, Austria, Vigny's first significant work as a writer was the libretto for Robert Winterberg's operetta Fasching in Paris (1910). After serving in the French Army during World War I, he began a relationship with Marie-Louise Caussat, the mother of French songwriter Charles Trenet. She divorced her first husband in 1920, and married Vigny in 1922.

Vigny, his new wife, and her children moved to Berlin in the early 1920s. There he established a jazz nightclub which played an instrumental role in the musical development of Charles Trenet during his formative years. He began working as a screenwriter for Vita-Film in 1924. He wrote several screenplays in partnership with other writers, many of them German-British film collaborations. In the early 1930s he relocated to Paris. He continued to write screenplays for a variety of international film companies into the early 1950s. His final screenplay was for the 1951 war drama The Lost One which he co-authored with the film's director, Peter Lorre.

As a novelist, Vigny's best known work was Amy Jolly, die Frau aus Marrakesch (1927) which was marketed as an autobiographical work based on his experiences serving in the French Foreign Legion in Morocco. The people depicted in the novel were allegedly real people Vigny met while in Marrakesh. It was adapted by Paramount Pictures into the 1930 film Morocco. The film starred Marlene Dietrich in an Academy Award nominated performance as a bisexual nightclub singer; a portrayal regarded as an early icon of queer cinema.

== Early life ==
Vigny was born on 28 October 1889 in Commercy, France. His family was Jewish. He had dual citizenship in both Germany and France, and grew up in Vienna. With Louis Windhopp he co-wrote the libretto to the 1910 operetta Fasching in Paris by composer Robert Winterberg. It premiered in Vienna at the Venedig in Wien on May 13, 1910.

In 1917 Vigny was wounded while serving in the French Army in World War I. While hospitalized in Narbonne he met his future wife Marie-Louise Caussat. At that time she was married to her first husband, Lucien Trenet, with whom she had two young sons, including the future singer-songwriter Charles Trenet. Vigny and Caussat had an extramarital affair and Caussat divorced her first husband in 1920; later marrying Vigny in 1922.

== Later life and career ==
Vigny moved with his wife and two stepsons to Berlin in the early 1920s where Vigny owned and operated a jazz nightclub. His stepson Charles was heavily influenced by the jazz musicians he heard performing at this club, and they informed his musical tastes as a songwriter.

Vigny began working as a screenwriter for Vita-Film; creating the screenplay for the 1924 picture Ssanin which was based on the novel Sanin by Mikhail Artsybashev. He next worked in collaboration with Adolf Lantz in crafting the screenplay for the 1927 film Ghost Train which was a German-British collaboration between Phoebus Film and Gainsborough Pictures. The film was adapted from the 1923 play The Ghost Train by Arnold Ridley. He collaborated with Lantz again on the screenplay for another German-British film, Number 17 (1928), which they adapted from the 1925 play of the same name by Joseph Jefferson Farjeon.

In 1927 he published the novel Amy Jolly, die Frau aus Marrakesch (English: Amy Jolly, the Woman from Marrakesh) which was marketed as an autobiographical novel based on Vigny's experiences serving in the Moroccan Division of the French Foreign Legion and the people he met while in Marrakesh. The novel was adapted by Joseph von Sternberg into the 1930 film Morocco for Paramount Pictures. The actress Marlene Dietrich was nominated for the Academy Award for Best Actress for her performance in this film, and her work in this picture as a bisexual tuxedo wearing nightclub singer is considered an early iconic role in queer cinema. Another novel, Nell John. Der Roman einer Verjüngten (English: Nell John, The Tale of a Rejuvenated Woman), also appeared in 1927.

At the beginning of the 1930s, Vigny went to Paris, where he continued to collaborate as a screenwriter for international co-productions. The little-known film Bariole (1932), from this period, is his only work as a film director.

After this period, Vigny worked only occasionally as a screenwriter. His last screenplay was the critically acclaimed Der Verlorene (The Lost One) (1951), co-written with Peter Lorre, who also directed and acted in the film.

He died in Munich on 31 October 1965.

== Filmography ==
- Ssanin (dir. Friedrich Feher, 1924)
- Ghost Train (dir. Géza von Bolváry, 1927)
- Knights of the Night (dir. Max Reichmann, 1928)
- Number 17 (dir. Géza von Bolváry, 1928)
- The Wrecker (dir. Géza von Bolváry, 1929)
- Tonka of the Gallows (dir. Karl Anton, 1930)
- Morocco (dir. Josef von Sternberg, 1930)
- A Girl from the Reeperbahn (dir. Karl Anton, 1930)
- The Indictment (dir. Dimitri Buchowetzki, 1931) - French-language version of Manslaughter (1930)
- Reckless Youth (dir. Leo Mittler, 1931) - German-language version of Manslaughter (1930)
- The Case of Colonel Redl (dir. Karl Anton, 1931)
- The Rebel (1931) (dir. Adelqui Migliar, 1931) - French-language version of The Virtuous Sin (1930)
- The Night of Decision (dir. Dimitri Buchowetzki, 1931) - German-language version of The Virtuous Sin (1930)
- Rive gauche (dir. Alexander Korda, 1931) - French-language version of Laughter (1930)
- Lo mejor es reir (dir. Florián Rey and E. W. Emo, 1931) - Spanish-language version of Laughter (1930)
- The Men Around Lucy (dir. Alexander Korda, 1931) - German-language version of Laughter (1930)
- Côte d'Azur (dir. Roger Capellani, 1932)
- Transit Camp (dir. Max Reichmann, 1932)
- Baroud (dir. Rex Ingram and Alice Terry, 1932)
- Bariole (dir. Benno Vigny, 1934)
- Odette (dir. Jacques Houssin and Giorgio Zambon, 1934)
- Parisian Life (dir. Robert Siodmak, 1936)
- Barry (dir. Richard Pottier, 1949)
- The Trip to Marrakesh (dir. Richard Eichberg, 1949)
- Vienna Waltzes (dir. Emil-Edwin Reinert, 1951)
- The Lost One (dir. Peter Lorre, 1951)
