= The Battle Against Berlin =

1926 film

- Soviet poster
- Directed by: Max Reichmann
- Written by: Curt J. Braun
- Produced by: Willy Zeunert
- Starring: Carlo Aldini; Jenny Jugo; Raimondo Van Riel
- Cinematography: Giovanni Vitrotti
- Production company: Phoebus Film
- Distributed by: Phoebus Film
- Release date: 22 January 1926
- Running time: 70 minutes
- Country: Germany
- Languages: Silent; German intertitles

The Battle Against Berlin (German: Der Kampf gegen Berlin) is a 1926 German silent crime thriller film directed by Max Reichmann and starring Carlo Aldini, Jenny Jugo and Raimondo Van Riel. The film's sets were designed by the art director Alfred Junge. It premiered at the Marmorhaus cinema in Berlin.

== Cast ==
- Carlo Aldini as Mac Nilson
- Jenny Jugo as Evi
- Raimondo Van Riel as William Tesborn
- Max Magnus as der Fremde
- Hanns Leo Reich as der Komplice
- Henri De Vries as Randolf
- Alexander Murski as Onkel
- Philipp Manning as Bob Nilson

== Bibliography ==
- Bock, Hans-Michael; Bergfelder, Tim, eds. (2009). The Concise Cinegraph: Encyclopaedia of German Cinema. New York: Berghahn Books. ISBN 978-1-57181-655-9.
