= Ssanin =

1924 film

- Directed by: Friedrich Feher; Boris Nevolin
- Written by: Mikhail Petrovich Artzybashev (novel); Friedrich Feher; Benno Vigny
- Starring: Magda Sonja; Inez Allegri; Oscar Beregi Sr.
- Cinematography: Eugen Hamm
- Production companies: Warszawskie Biuro Kinematograficzne Feniks; Vita-Film
- Release date: 7 November 1924
- Countries: Austria; Poland
- Languages: Silent; German intertitles

Ssanin is a 1924 Austrian-Polish silent film directed by Friedrich Feher and Boris Nevolin and starring Magda Sonja, Inez Allegri and Oscar Beregi Sr. It is based on the novel Sanin by Mikhail Petrovich Artzybashev.

== Cast ==
- Magda Sonja as Lydia Ssanina, Wladimir's sister
- Inez Allegri as Karssavina
- Oscar Beregi Sr. as Wladimir Petrowitsch Ssanin
- Babette Devrient as Mutter Ssanins
- Hans Moser as Diener bei Ssanin
- Józef Węgrzyn as Viktor Sergejewitsch Sarudin
- Reinhold Häussermann as Diener bei Sarudin
- Richard Edon as Dr. Nowikow
- Günther Hadank as Jurij Swaretschitsch
- Richard Duschinsky as Semjenow
- Viktor Franz as Sselowejtschik
- Robert Valberg as Malinowsky
- Nikolaus von Lovrie as Tanarew
- Hans Marr as Pjetr Iljitsch
- Karl Forest as Betrunkenener
- Fritz Strassny
- Frau. Newolina
- Boris Nevolin
- Gustav Diessl
- Viktoria Pohl-Meiser

== See also ==
- Lyda Ssanin (1923)

== Bibliography ==
- Otto Boele. Erotic nihilism in late imperial Russia the case of Mikhail Artsybashev's Sanin.. University of Wisconsin Press, 2009
