= Wrong Number, Miss =

1932 film

- Directed by: E. W. Emo
- Written by: Herbert Rosenfeld (story); Ernst Wolff
- Produced by: Alberto Giacalone
- Starring: Magda Schneider; Johannes Riemann; Trude Berliner
- Cinematography: Willy Goldberger
- Edited by: Fernando Tropea; Roger von Norman
- Music by: Otto Stransky
- Production company: Itala-Film
- Distributed by: Deutsche Lichtspiel-Syndikat
- Release date: 22 January 1932
- Running time: 76 minutes
- Country: Germany
- Language: German

Wrong Number, Miss (German: Fräulein – Falsch verbunden) is a 1932 German romantic comedy film directed by E. W. Emo and starring Magda Schneider, Johannes Riemann, and Trude Berliner. The film was shot at the Staaken Studios in Berlin with sets designed by the art directors Robert Neppach and Erwin Scharf. It was remade in Italian the same year as The Telephone Operator. In 1934 it was remade as a British film Give Her a Ring.

== Synopsis ==
Charmed by one of the callers she speaks to, a telephone operator arranges a rendezvous with him. Unfortunately it is at the same place where her boss is also having a secret assignation.

== Cast ==
- Magda Schneider as Inge Becker, Telefonistin
- Johannes Riemann as Rainer, Direktor im Fernsprechamt
- Trude Berliner as Lotte Schröder
- José Wedorn as Kammersänger West
- Flockina von Platen as Frau West
- Alexa von Porembsky as Telefonistin
- Jakob Tiedtke as Kantinenwirt Sperling
- Aenne Goerling as Aufsichtsdame
- Siegfried Berisch
- Karl Etlinger

== Bibliography ==
- Goble, Alan (1999). The Complete Index to Literary Sources in Film. Berlin: Walter de Gruyter. ISBN 978-3-11-095194-3.
- Klaus, Ulrich J. Deutsche Tonfilme: Jahrgang 1932. Klaus-Archiv, 1988.
