= Life's Circus =

1928 film

- Directed by: Max Reichmann
- Written by: Walter Angel (novel); Curt J. Braun
- Starring: Raimondo Van Riel; Ernst Van Duren; Kurt Gerron
- Cinematography: Herbert Körner; Friedrich Weinmann
- Production company: Deutsche Film Union
- Distributed by: Deutsche First National Pictures
- Release date: 1928
- Country: Germany
- Languages: Silent; German intertitles

Life's Circus (German: Manege) is a 1928 German silent drama film directed by Max Reichmann and starring Raimondo Van Riel, Ernst Van Duren and Kurt Gerron. It was shot at the Staaken Studios in Berlin. The film's sets were designed by Leopold Blonder. It was made by the German branch of First National Pictures and premiered at the Marmorhaus in Germany's capital city.

== Cast ==
- Raimondo Van Riel as Gaston Flamingo
- Ernst Van Duren as Ralf Flamingo
- Kurt Gerron as Bela Garay
- Lucie Höflich as Seine Frau
- Mary Johnson as Eve Garay
- Valerie Boothby as Frau im Nordexpress
- Valy Arnheim as Der Stallmeister
- Alexander Murski as Der Direktor

== Bibliography ==
- Bock, Hans-Michael & Bergfelder, Tim. The Concise Cinegraph: Encyclopaedia of German Cinema. Berghahn Books, 2009.
