= The Telephone Operator (1932 film) =

1932 film directed by Nunzio Malasomma

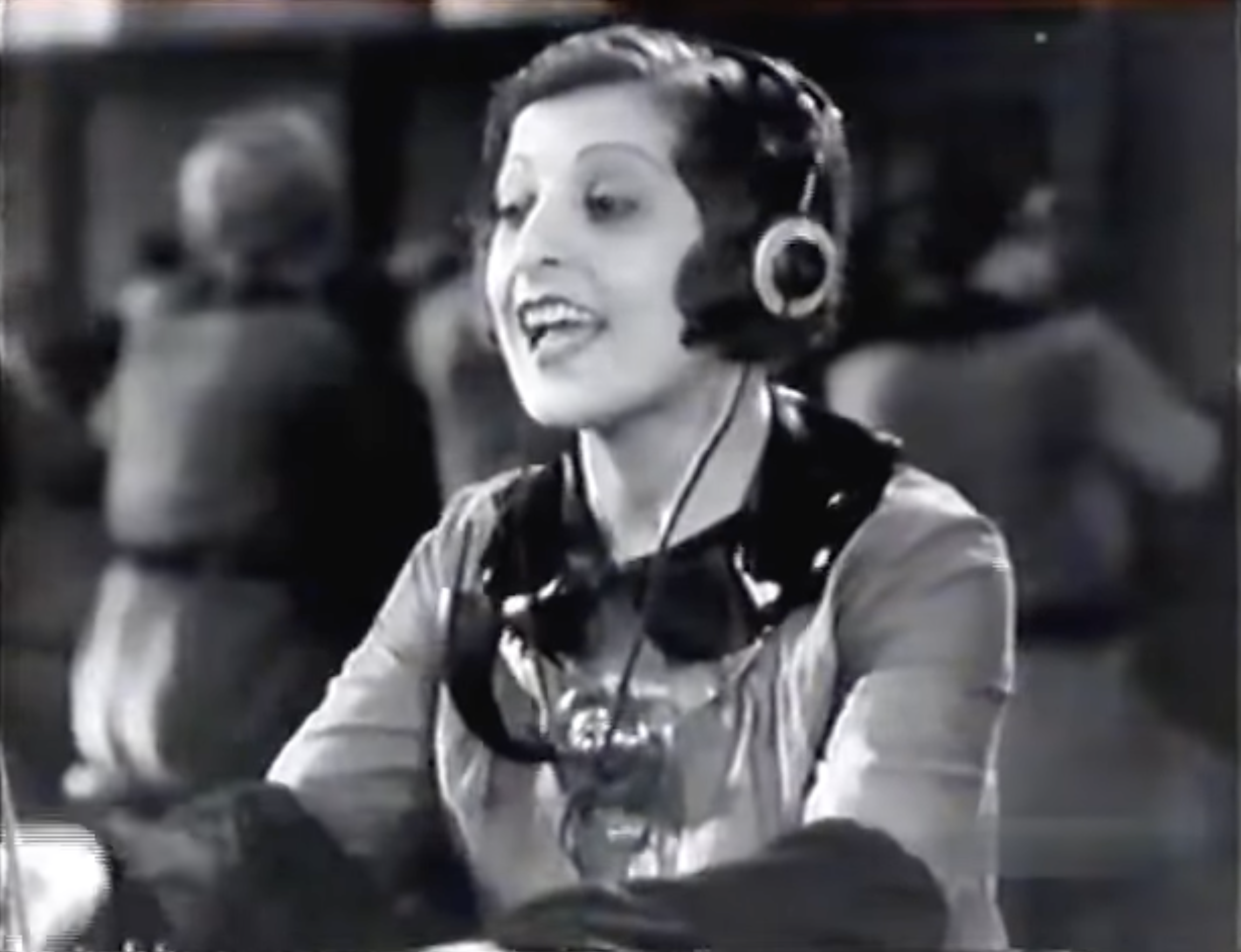
- Pola in a film scene
- Directed by: Nunzio Malasomma
- Written by: Friedrich Dammann; Herbert Rosenfeld (story); Aldo Vergano; Raffaello Matarazzo; Ernst Wolff
- Starring: Isa Pola; Mimì Aylmer; Luigi Cimara; Sergio Tofano
- Cinematography: Anchise Brizzi
- Edited by: Nunzio Malasomma
- Music by: Otto Stransky
- Production company: Società Italiana Cines
- Distributed by: Cinès-Pittaluga
- Release date: 1932
- Running time: 80 minutes
- Country: Italy
- Language: Italian

The Telephone Operator (Italian: La telefonista) is a 1932 Italian comedy film directed by Nunzio Malasomma and starring Isa Pola, Mimì Aylmer and Luigi Cimara. It was a remake of the German film Wrong Number, Miss, released the same year.

The future star María Denis had a small role in the film.

== Cast ==
- Isa Pola as Clara – the telephone operator
- Mimì Aylmer as Renée – the mannequin
- Luigi Cimara as the telephone director
- Sergio Tofano as Bàttigo – the tenor
- Giovanni Grasso as Gedeone
- Marcella Rovena as Bàttigo's wife

== Bibliography ==
- Reich, Jacqueline & Garofalo, Piero. Re-viewing Fascism: Italian Cinema, 1922-1943. Indiana University Press, 2002.
- Mancini, Elaine. Struggles of the Italian film industry during fascism, 1930-1935. UMI Research Press, 1985.
