= Ariadne in Hoppegarten =

1928 film directed by Robert Dinesen

- Directed by: Robert Dinesen
- Written by: Curt J. Braun; Ludwig Wolff (novel)
- Produced by: Paul Ebner; Maxim Galitzenstein
- Starring: Alfred Abel; Maria Jacobini; Paul Henckels
- Cinematography: Georg Bruckbauer; Carl Drews
- Production company: Maxim-Film
- Distributed by: Bavaria Film
- Release date: 1928
- Country: Germany
- Languages: Silent; German intertitles

Ariadne in Hoppegarten is a 1928 German silent sports film directed by Robert Dinesen and starring Alfred Abel, Maria Jacobini and Paul Henckels. It takes place in Hoppegarten, a traditional centre of horseracing in the German capital of Berlin.

The film's sets were designed by Leopold Blonder.

== Cast ==
- Alfred Abel as Valentin Zorn, Fabrikant
- Maria Jacobini as Anna, seine Frau
- Paul Henckels as Mathias, sein Bruder
- Jean Bradin as Graf Widmann
- Gerhard Ritterband as Gatterer, sein Bursche
- Andreas Behrens-Klausen as Gilchrist, Jockey
- Corry Bell as Tutti
- Karl Junge-Swinburne

== See also ==
- List of films about horses

== Bibliography ==
- Bock, Hans-Michael; Bergfelder, Tim, eds. (2009). The Concise Cinegraph: Encyclopaedia of German Cinema. New York: Berghahn Books. ISBN 978-1-57181-655-9.
