= Knights of the Night =

1928 film

- Directed by: Max Reichmann
- Written by: Benno Vigny
- Starring: Ivan Koval-Samborsky; Georges Charlia; La Jana
- Cinematography: Frederik Fuglsang
- Music by: Pasquale Perris
- Production company: Deutsche Film Union
- Distributed by: Deutsche First National Pictures
- Release date: 17 October 1928
- Country: Germany
- Languages: Silent; German intertitles

Knights of the Night (German: Ritter der Nacht) is a 1928 German silent film directed by Max Reichmann and starring Ivan Koval-Samborsky, Georges Charlia, and La Jana.

The film's art direction was by Leopold Blonder.

== Cast ==
- Ivan Koval-Samborsky as André de Frontignan
- Georges Charlia as François de Frantignan
- La Jana as Marie-Louise
- William Dieterle as Marius
- Raimondo Van Riel as Mimile
- Suzanne Delmas as Louisette
- Robert Garrison as Der alte Pascal
- Harry Grunwald
- Edith Meinhard as Mimiles Mädel
- Steffie Vida

== Bibliography ==
- Bock, Hans-Michael; Bergfelder, Tim, eds. (2009). The Concise Cinegraph: Encyclopaedia of German Cinema. New York: Berghahn Books. ISBN 978-1-57181-655-9.
