= Morocco (film) =

1930 film by Josef von Sternberg

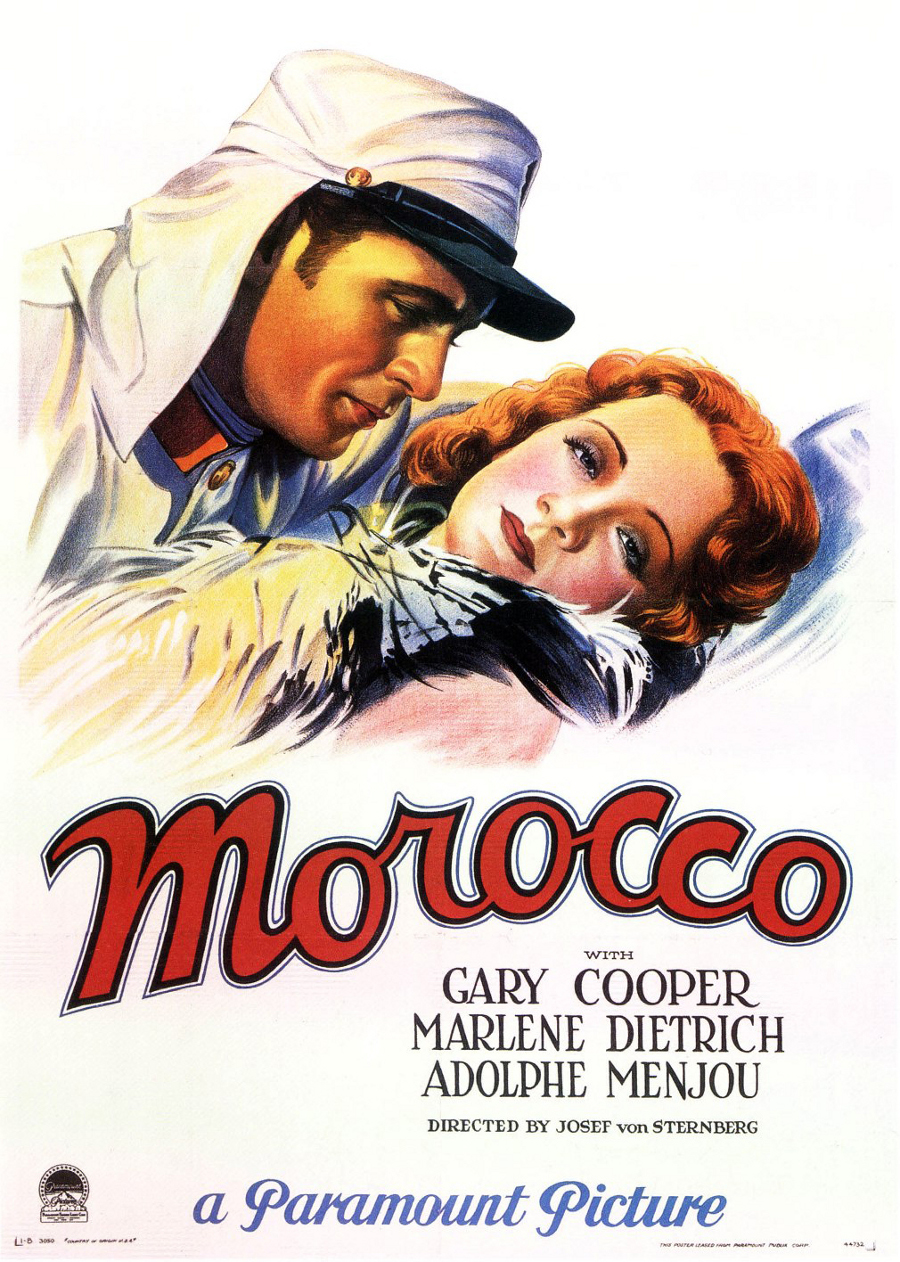
- Theatrical release poster
- Directed by: Josef von Sternberg
- Screenplay by: Jules Furthman (adapted by)
- Based on: Amy Jolly, die Frau aus Marrakesch; 1927 novel by Benno Vigny
- Produced by: Hector Turnbull (uncredited)
- Starring: Gary Cooper; Marlene Dietrich; Adolphe Menjou
- Cinematography: Lee Garmes
- Edited by: Sam Winston (uncredited)
- Music by: Karl Hajos (uncredited)
- Production company: Paramount Pictures
- Distributed by: Paramount Publix Corporation
- Release date: November 14, 1930 (United States)
- Running time: 91 minutes
- Country: United States
- Languages: English; French; Spanish; Italian; Arabic
- Budget: $491,299.36

Morocco is a 1930 American pre-Code romantic drama film directed by Josef von Sternberg and starring Gary Cooper, Marlene Dietrich, and Adolphe Menjou. Based on the 1927 novel Amy Jolly (the on-screen credits state: from the play 'Amy Jolly') by Benno Vigny and adapted by Jules Furthman, the film is about a cabaret singer and a Legionnaire who fall in love during the Rif War, and whose relationship is complicated by his womanizing and the appearance of a rich man who is also in love with her. The film is famous for a scene in which Dietrich performs a song dressed in a man's tailcoat and kisses another woman (to the embarrassment of the latter), both of which were considered scandalous for the period.

Dietrich was nominated for the Academy Award for Best Actress in a Leading Role, von Sternberg for Best Director, Hans Dreier for Best Art Direction, and Lee Garmes for Best Cinematography. In 1992, Morocco was selected for preservation in the United States National Film Registry by the Library of Congress as being "culturally, historically, or aesthetically significant".

== Plot ==
Morocco (1930)

In Mogador, Morocco in the late 1920s, a unit of the French Foreign Legion returns from a campaign, among them Private Tom Brown. Meanwhile, on a ship bound for Mogador is the disillusioned nightclub singer Amy Jolly. Wealthy La Bessière tries to make her acquaintance, but she rebuffs him.

Amy becomes the headliner at a nightclub. After a performance, she sells apples to audience members, including La Bessière and Brown. When Amy gives the latter his "change", she slips him her key.

On the way to Amy's house, Tom encounters Adjutant Caesar's wife. She clearly has a clandestine relationship with him, which she desires to maintain, but Tom rejects her. He enters Amy's house and the two become acquainted. Amy is embittered with life and men after repeated betrayals, and asks if Tom can restore her faith in men. He answers that he is the wrong man for that. She asks him to leave.

Back in the street, Tom encounters Caesar's wife again, while her husband watches undetected from the shadows. Meanwhile, Amy changes her mind and comes after Tom; they go back to her house. Madame Caesar hires two ruffians to attack Tom, but he seriously wounds both.

The next day, Tom is brought before Caesar, Tom's commanding officer, for injuring the two natives. Amy testifies that he was attacked, but Caesar makes Tom aware that he knows about Tom's involvement with his wife. La Bessière, whose affections for Amy continue unabated, knows of her feelings for Tom and offers to use his influence to lighten Tom's punishment. Instead of a court-martial, Tom is reassigned to a detachment commanded by Caesar that is leaving soon for Amalfa Pass. Suspecting that Caesar intends to rid himself of his romantic rival, Tom decides to desert and run away with Amy.

Tom goes to Amy's nightclub dressing room. He overhears La Bessière offer to marry her and her polite rejection, before knocking on the door. La Bessière leaves Amy alone with Tom, who tells her that, if she will join him, he will desert and board a freighter to Europe. She agrees to go along and asks Tom to wait while she performs. Once he is alone, he notices a lavish bracelet that La Bessière gave her. Tom decides Amy would be better off with a rich man than with a poor legionnaire. He writes on the mirror, "I changed my mind. Good luck!", and leaves.

In the morning, Amy, after a drunken, miserable night, arrives in the town square with La Bessière so she can bid Tom farewell. She asks La Bessière about some women following the company, remarking that the women must be mad. He responds, "I don't know. You see, they love their men."

On the way to Amalfa Pass, Tom's detachment runs into a machine-gun nest. Caesar orders Tom to deal with it, and Tom suspects it is a suicide mission. To his surprise, Caesar decides to accompany him. After drawing his pistol (apparently to kill Tom), Caesar is shot and killed by the enemy.

Back in Mogador, Amy accepts La Bessière's marriage proposal and tries to make herself love him, but she still pines for Tom. At an engagement party, she learns that Tom's detachment has returned. She leaves the party and is told Tom was wounded and left behind to recuperate in a hospital. She informs La Bessière that she must go to Tom, and, wanting only her happiness, he drives her to the hospital. It turns out Tom had been faking an injury to avoid combat and, when this was discovered, he was assigned to a new unit in the Legion. Amy goes to a bar where Tom is, briefly talks with him, and when he leaves, finds he carved into the table the name "Amy Jolly" and a heart.

The next morning, Amy and La Bessière watch Tom's new unit preparing to march away. Tom and Amy briefly speak, then wave goodbye. When Amy sees a handful of women following the legionnaires, she impulsively leaves La Bessière, kicks off her high-heeled shoes, and joins them, following Tom into the desert.

== Cast ==
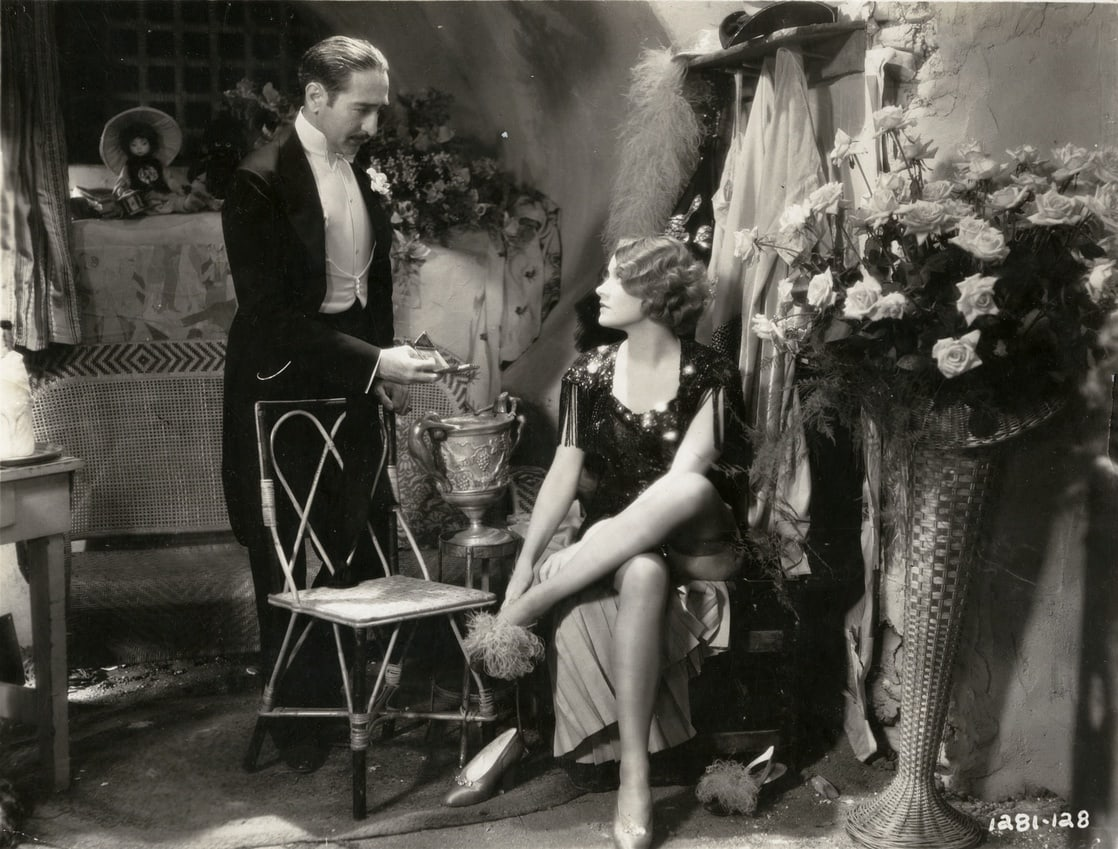
L–R: La Bessière (Adolphe Menjou) and Amy Jolly (Marlene Dietrich)

- Gary Cooper as Légionnaire Tom Brown
- Marlene Dietrich as Mademoiselle Amy Jolly
- Adolphe Menjou as Monsieur La Bessière
- Ullrich Haupt as Adjutant Caesar
- Eve Southern as Madame Caesar
- Francis McDonald as Sergeant Tatoche
- Paul Porcasi as Lo Tinto

Uncredited (in order of appearance)

- Albert Conti as Colonel Quinnovieres
- Thomas A. Curran as a nightclub patron
- Émile Chautard as French General
- Michael Visaroff as Colonel Alexandre Barratière
- Juliette Compton as Anna Dolores, a woman who clings to Tom
- Theresa Harris as a camp follower

== Background ==
Even before Josef von Sternberg's The Blue Angel was released to global acclaim in 1930, Paramount Pictures took a keen interest in its new star, Marlene Dietrich. When the Berlin production was completed in January, Sternberg departed Germany before its premiere on April 1, confident his work would be a success. Legend has it that Dietrich included a copy of author Benno Vigny's story Amy Jolly in a going-away gift package to Sternberg when he sailed for America. He and screenwriter Jules Furthman would write a script for Morocco based on the Vigny story.

On the basis of test footage Sternberg provided from the yet unreleased The Blue Angel, producer B. P. Schulberg agreed to bring Dietrich to Hollywood in February 1930 under a two-picture contract. When she arrived in the United States, Sternberg welcomed her with gifts, including a green Rolls-Royce Phantom II, which featured in some scenes of Morocco.

Dietrich "was subjected to the full power of Paramount's public relations machine", launching her into "international stardom" before American moviegoers had seen her as Lola Lola in The Blue Angel, which appeared in U.S. theaters in 1931.

== Production ==
The character of Amy was toned down considerably from the novel. As in the book, in the film the name aimee jolie (French for "beloved and pretty") is meant ironically as Amy is portrayed as a fallen star past her prime, a desperately lonely woman lost in despair who has gone to Morocco to die. However, in the book, the character of Amy was a prostitute and a drug addict, both of which were unacceptable even under the looser censorship in 1930 Hollywood, and these aspects of Amy's character were removed from the film during the script-writing. Likewise, the ending was changed from the book to the film. In the book, Amy abandons Tom and at the conclusion of the novel, boards a ship to Buenos Aires. Sternberg disliked the ending in the book, and gave the film the more romantic ending where Amy chooses to be with Brown by going with him into the Sahara.

Sternberg's depiction of "picturesque" Morocco elicited a favorable response from the Moroccan government, which ran announcements in The New York Times inviting American tourists to enjoy the country "just as Gary Cooper [was seduced by the] unforgettable landscapes and engaging people." However, the film was filmed entirely in southern California, and Sternberg felt compelled to personally reassure the Pasha of Marrakesh that Morocco had not been shot in his domain.

Cinematographer Lee Garmes and Sternberg (himself a skilled camera technician) developed the distinctive lighting methods that served to enhance Dietrich's best facial features, while obscuring her slightly bulbous nose.

According to Robert Osborne of Turner Classic Movies, Cooper and Sternberg did not get along. Sternberg filmed so as to make Cooper look up at Dietrich, emphasizing her at his expense. Cooper complained to his studio bosses and got it stopped. Cooper greatly disliked Sternberg, complaining that he received little in the way of direction from him about how to play Brown. It was open knowledge on the set that Sternberg and Dietrich were lovers, and Cooper felt that he was very much a secondary figure in the film as Sternberg devoted all of his attention to Dietrich. As a way of compensation, Cooper brought his mistress, the Mexican actress Lupe Vélez, onto the set and went out of his way to demonstratively show his affections by having her sit on his lap between takes and passionately kissing her as often as possible.

Shooting for Morocco was completed in August 1930.

The final scene of Morocco is recreated in the 1946 Mexican film Enamorada, directed by Emilio Fernández.

== Radio Adaptation ==
Morocco was adapted as a one-hour radio broadcast by the Lux Radio Theatre on June 1, 1936 (under the title The Legionnaire and the Lady), with Marlene Dietrich reprising her film role, and with Clark Gable assuming the role of the Legionnaire. This was Lux Radio's debut broadcast from Hollywood, following its move from New York City.

== Home media ==
Morocco was released by Universal Studios in DVD on April 25, 2011, under label Universal Vault Series.

== Reception ==
Premiering in New York City on December 6, 1930, Morocco's success at the box office was "immediate and impressive".

Accolades for the film were issued by Soviet director Sergei Eisenstein, screenwriter Robert E. Sherwood, and filmmaker Charles Chaplin, who said of the film, "yes, [Sternberg] is an artist ... it is his best film [to date]."

In a contemporary review, the French critic Michel Vauclaire wrote: "Every year in the US, half a dozen novels are published about the Legion, in general very severe and quite fantastic. It's obviously on this sort of fiction that Sternberg has based his research. Perhaps the film reflects the American public's idea of the Legionaries. In France, despite its dramatic pretensions, it will raise a laugh".

The film garnered Academy Award nominations for Best Director (Sternberg), Best Actress (Dietrich), Best Art Direction (Hans Dreier), and Best Cinematography (Lee Garmes), though it did not win any awards.

The Japanese filmmaker Akira Kurosawa cited this movie as one of his 100 favorite films.

== Box Office ==
Director von Sternberg reported in his 1965 autobiography that producer Adolph Zukor informed him that Paramount “had been saved from bankruptcy” by the box office success of Morocco.

== Retrospective appraisal ==
Charles Silver, curator at the Museum of Modern Art's Department of Film, offers this assessment of Morocco:

"Sternberg was the first director to attain full mastery and control over what was essentially a new medium by restoring the fluidity and beauty of the late silent period. One of the key elements in this was his understanding of the value of silence itself. Morocco contains long sections sustained only by its stunning visual beauty, augmented with appropriate music and aural effects. Sternberg was the first artist to make an authentic virtue of the arrival of sound.

== Theme ==
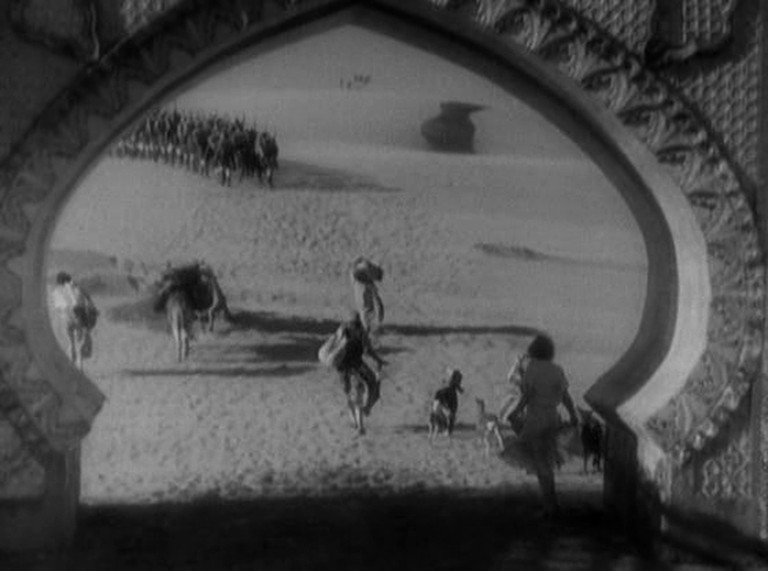
Amy Jolly (Marlene Dietrich) pursues her lover into the desert: "The most romantic gesture in Sternberg's visual vocabulary."

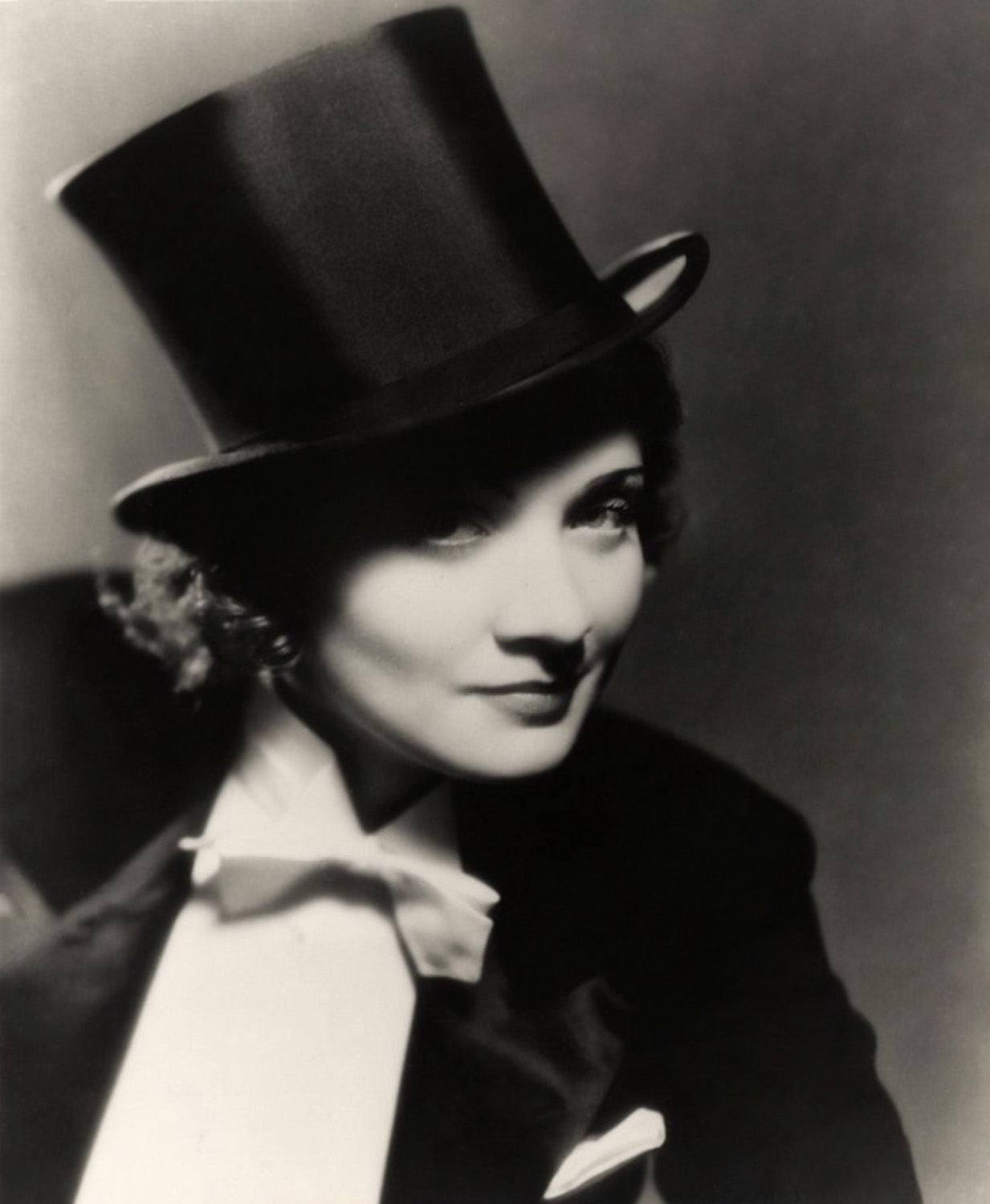
"The purveyor of pansexuality and the supreme lover, male or female."

With Morocco, Sternberg examines the "interchange of masculine and feminine characteristics" in a "genuine interplay between male and female."

=== Tom Brown ===
The character of Tom Brown was portrayed as an example of a lost soul, a tough, jaded American serving in the French Foreign Legion with a name that was so bland that it was clearly a pseudonym. In the film, it is strongly implied that Brown was attempting to escape a painful past by enlisting in the French Foreign Legion, which famously "asks no questions" about an applicant's background. Likewise, Brown seems to have no future beyond fighting for a cause that he does not believe in, in Morocco, and seemingly sleeping with every woman in sight. It is only when he meets Amy that he finds someone that he actually cares about and a reason to be hopeful about the future. Most notably Brown, who was portrayed as an entirely cynical, selfish character prior to meeting Amy, displays an altruistic side as he encourages Amy to marry La Bessière who is more capable of supporting her financially due to his wealth than Brown is under his private's salary. Despite Brown's efforts to push Amy out of his life, when he is alone, he carves the "Amy Jolly" onto the table along with a heart.

=== "When Love Dies": Dietrich's male impersonation ===
Dietrich's "butch performance" dressed in "top hat, white tie and tails" includes a "mock seduction" of a pretty female cabaret patron, whom Dietrich "outrages with a kiss." Dietrich's costume simultaneously mocks the pretensions of one lover (Menjou's La Bessière) and serves as an invitation to a handsome soldier-of-fortune (Cooper's Tom Brown), the two men being presented by Sternberg as contrasting conceptions of masculinity."

This famous sequence provides an insight into Dietrich's character, Amy Jolly, as well as the director himself: "Dietrich's impersonation is an adventure, an act of bravado that subtly alters her conception of herself as a woman, and what begins as self-expression ends in self-sacrifice, perhaps the path also of Sternberg as an artist," according to critic Andrew Sarris

=== La Bessière's humiliation ===
Amy Jolly's devoted suitor, Menjou's La Bessière, "part stoic, part sybarite, part satanist", is destined to lose the object of his desire. La Bessière's response to Jolly's desertion reveals the nature of the man and presents a key thematic element of the film:

In Menjou's pained politeness of expression is engraved the age-old tension between Apollonian and Dionysian demands of art, between pride in restraint and passion in excess ... when Dietrich kisses him goodbye, Menjou clutches her wrist in one last spasmodic reflex of passion, but the other hand retains its poise at his side, the gestures of form and feeling thus conflicting to the very end of the drama.

The La Bessière character has autobiographical overtones for Sternberg, as Menjou has looks and mannerisms that resemble the director. Critic Andrew Sarris observed: "Sternberg has never been as close to any character as he is to this elegant expatriate."

=== Dietrich's high-heeled march into the dunes ===
There has been the criticism that an effect of a trek across the desert in high heels is unrealistic and while not noted would reach a definition of camp. The observation is technically correct. Dietrich's character does set out in her society shoes but within yards breaks her stride and removes them.

The "absurdity" of the closing sequence, in which Dietrich, "sets out into the desert sands on spike heels in search of Gary Cooper", was noted by critics at the time of the film's release. The image, however odd, is part of the "dream décor" that abandoned "documentary certification" to create "a world of illusions." As Sarris points out, "The complaint that a woman in high heels would not walk off into the desert is nonetheless meaningless. A dream does not require endurance, only the will to act."

Film historian Charles Silver considers the final scene as one that "no artist today would dare attempt":

"The film's unforgettable ending works dramatically because it comes at a moment of panic, one in a series of such moments that have brought Dietrich to the brink. Sternberg says, 'The average human being lives behind an impenetrable veil and will disclose his deep emotions only in a crisis which robs him of control.' Amy Jolly had hidden behind her veil for many years and many men, and her emergence, the sublimation of her fear and pride to her desire, is one of the most supremely romantic gestures in film."

== Accolades ==
Award	Year	Category	Recipient	Result
National Board of Review Awards	1930	Top Ten Films	Morocco	Won
Academy Awards	1931	Best Director	Josef von Sternberg	Nominated
Academy Awards	1931	Best Actress	Marlene Dietrich	Nominated
Academy Awards	1931	Best Art Direction	Hans Dreier	Nominated
Academy Awards	1931	Best Cinematography	Lee Garmes	Nominated
Kinema Junpo Awards	1932	Best Foreign Language Film	Josef von Sternberg	Won
National Film Registry	1992	Narrative feature	Morocco	Won

The film was ranked 83rd on the American Film Institute's 2002 list AFI's 100 Years...100 Passions.
