= Once in the Summer =

- Directed by: Khanan Shmain
- Written by: Ilya Ilf; Yevgeni Petrov
- Starring: Igor Ilyinsky; Leonid Kmit; Ivan Koval-Samborsky
- Cinematography: Vitali Filippov; Aleksandr Lavrik
- Music by: Vyacheslav Volkov
- Production company: Dovzhenko Film Studios
- Release date: 28 April 1936
- Country: Soviet Union
- Language: Russian

Once in the Summer (Russian: Odnazhdy letom) is a 1936 Soviet comedy film directed by Khanan Shmain and starring Igor Ilyinsky, Leonid Kmit and Ivan Koval-Samborsky.

== Plot ==
Two friends, Telescop (Igor Ilyinsky) and Zhora (Leonid Kmit), assemble a car in their workshop and embark on a journey with the dream of reaching Moscow. Along the way, they meet a respectable man who introduces himself as Professor Sen-Verbud (Igor Ilyinsky) and his niece Fenya (Elena Savitskaya). The young men are charmed by Fenya, but the professor discourages conversation, claiming they are in a hurry for a lecture.

In a small town, Sen-Verbud performs a simple trick for the local club manager and persuades him to announce an evening lecture by the "famous Indian professor," known for debunking miracles and superstitions. The news spreads quickly, drawing a full house. Before the performance, the manager reminds the professor that a quarter of the ticket sales must go to the club. Sen-Verbud promises to settle up after the lecture but flees with Fenya before the event concludes. Outside, the pair encounter Zhora and Telescop, who, unaware of the professor's deceit, help them escape the pursuing crowd.

The professor's schemes come to an end when a criminal investigator recognizes him as a notorious con artist, known for posing as "the third son of Lieutenant Schmidt," "Karl Marx's nephew," and "a wealthy suitor from Argentina." The professor is taken into custody, while Zhora and Telescop invite Fenya to join them on their journey to Moscow. Near the city, their car merges with a column of vehicles in a nationwide motor rally but breaks down at the finish line. In the final scene, the friends, now in work overalls at a car factory's gates, ask Fenya if she loves either of them. Her response is drowned out by the sound of the factory whistle.

== Cast ==
- Igor Ilyinsky as Teleskop / professor Sen-Verbuda
- Leonid Kmit as Zhora
- Ivan Koval-Samborsky
- B. Movchan as Kotya
- A. Savitskaya
- Ivan Tverdokhleb

== Bibliography ==
- Rollberg, Peter. Historical Dictionary of Russian and Soviet Cinema. Scarecrow Press, 2008.
