= Derby (1926 film) =

1926 film directed by Max Reichmann

- Directed by: Max Reichmann
- Written by: Ernst Klein (novel); Curt J. Braun; Wilhelm Stücklen
- Produced by: Joe May
- Starring: Barbara von Annenkoff; Henry Stuart; Grete Mosheim
- Cinematography: Carl Drews; Albert Schattmann; Edgar S. Ziesemer
- Music by: Willy Schmidt-Gentner
- Production company: May-Film
- Distributed by: Phoebus Film
- Release date: 15 November 1926
- Country: Germany
- Languages: Silent; German intertitles

Derby (German: Derby. Ein Ausschnitt aus der Welt des Trabersports) is a 1926 German silent sports film directed by Max Reichmann and starring Barbara von Annenkoff, Henry Stuart and Grete Mosheim. The film's sets were designed by Erich Zander. It was based on a novel of the same title by Ernst Klein.

== Cast ==
- Barbara von Annenkoff as Kitty Roy
- Henry Stuart as Baron von Reiffenberg
- Alexandra Nalder as Liesel, seine Tochter
- Otto Wallburg as Emil Henschke, Fleischwaren en gros
- Grete Mosheim as Edith, seine Tochter
- Franz Lingner as Arpad Varady
- Gerd Fricke as Alf Winkfield
- Robert Leffler as Claren
- Max Nosseck

== See also ==
- List of films about horses

== Bibliography ==
- Hans-Michael Bock & Claudia Lenssen. Joe May: Regisseur und Produzent. 1991.
