= Ivan Koval-Samborsky =

Ukrainian stage and film actor

- Born: Іван Іванович Коваль-Самборський; Ivan Ivanovich Koval-Samborsky; 16 September 1893; Kharkiv, Russian Empire
- Died: 10 January 1962 (aged 68); Soviet Union
- Occupation: Actor
- Years active: 1925-1961 (film)

Ivan Koval-Samborsky (Ukrainian: Іван Коваль-Самборський; 16 September 1893 – 10 January 1962) was a Ukrainian stage and film actor. After establishing himself in the Soviet film industry in the 1920s, he briefly went to work in Germany during the late 1920s before returning to Russia following the arrival of sound. In 1938 he was arrested by the Soviet authorities, leading to his most recent film, the anti-Nazi The Swamp Soldiers, having to be reshot to minimize his role. He did not appear in another film until 1957.

== Selected filmography ==
- Chess Fever (1925)
- His Call (1925)
- Mother (1926)
- Man from the Restaurant (1927)
- The Forty-First (1927)
- The Prince of Rogues (1928)
- Mary Lou (1928)
- Love in the Cowshed (1928)
- The Yellow Ticket (1928)
- Knights of the Night (1928)
- Mariett Dances Today (1928)
- When the Guard Marches (1928)
- Cagliostro (1929)
- My Heart is a Jazz Band (1929)
- Mascots (1929)
- Alraune (1930)
- Bookkeeper Kremke (1930)
- Busy Girls (1930)
- The Big Attraction (1931)
- Transit Camp (1932)
- Once in the Summer (1936)

== Bibliography ==
- Olga Gershenson. The Phantom Holocaust: Soviet Cinema and Jewish Catastrophe. Rutgers University Press, 2013.
