= André Picard (playwright) =

French playwright (1873–1926)

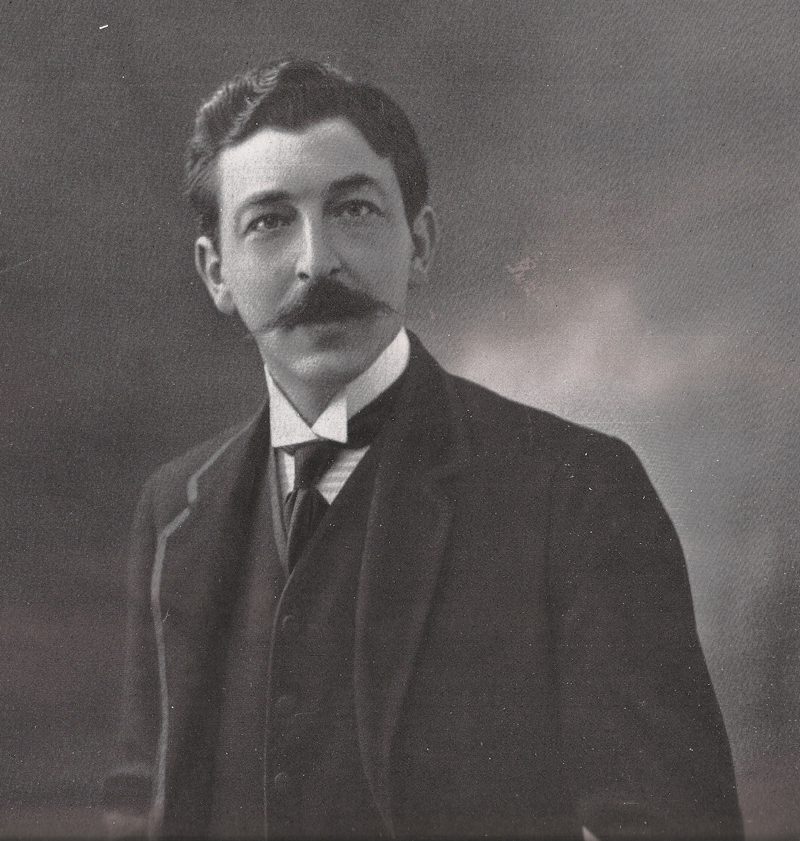
Photograph of Picard by Henri Manuel

André Picard (7 November 1873 – 25 February 1926) was a French playwright. He co-authored the plays Mon Homme and The Man in Evening Clothes which were adapted to film. His French play Kiki was adapted to the stage in the United States by David Belasco and into several films.

He was born in Paris. David Belasco adapted and produced his show Kiki.

He was in the Legion of Honor. He died in Paris.

== Theater ==
- Jeunesse, adapted to the stage in the U.S. by H. B. Irving in 1906
- L' Ange (1910)
- Fugitive (1911)
- Mon Homme (1921), co-authored with Francis Carco
- The Man in Evening Clothes
- Kiki

== Filmography ==
- Shadows of Paris (1924)
- She Wolves (1925)
- Kiki (1926 film)
- Kiki (1931 film)
- Kiki (1932 film)
