= Bookkeeper Kremke =

1930 film

- Directed by: Marie Harder
- Written by: Herbert Rosenfeld
- Starring: Hermann Vallentin; Anna Sten; Ivan Koval-Samborsky
- Cinematography: Robert Baberske; Franz Koch
- Production company: Naturfilm Hubert Schonger
- Release date: 15 September 1930
- Country: Germany
- Languages: Silent; German intertitles

Bookkeeper Kremke (German: Lohnbuchhalter Kremke) is a 1930 German silent drama film directed by Marie Harder and starring Hermann Vallentin, Anna Sten and Ivan Koval-Samborsky.

It was made with backing from Germany's Socialist Party. Along with Brothers (1929), it was one of two contemporary films espousing the movement's left-wing ideology. The film's sets were designed by Carl Ludwig Kirmse.

It was not a commercial success on its release, which is generally attributed to its theme and to the fact that it was a released as a silent at a time when cinemas had gone over almost entirely to showing sound films.

== Synopsis ==
After losing his job, a clerk is devastated by the threatened drop in social status now that he is unemployed. However, his daughter falls in love with a chauffeur who encourages her to embrace her new working-class status.

== Cast ==
- Hermann Vallentin as Kremke
- Anna Sten as Kremkes Tochter
- Ivan Koval-Samborsky as Junger Arbeiter
- Else Heller
- Inge Landgut
- Wolfgang Zilzer

== Bibliography ==
- Tim Bergfelder, Erica Carter & Deniz Göktürk. The German Cinema Book. BFI, 2002.
- Bruce Arthur Murray. Film and the German Left in the Weimar Republic: From Caligari to Kuhle Wampe. University of Texas Press, 1990.
