= Woman in Flames =

1928 film

- Directed by: Max Reichmann
- Written by: George Froeschel (novel); Hans Rameau
- Produced by: Robert Wüllner
- Starring: Olga Chekhova; Alexej Bondireff; Ferdinand von Alten
- Cinematography: Franz Planer
- Production company: Tschechowa Film
- Distributed by: Bavaria Film
- Release date: 28 November 1928
- Running time: 102 minutes
- Country: Germany
- Languages: Silent; German intertitles

Woman in Flames (German: Weib in Flammen) is a 1928 German silent drama film directed by Max Reichmann and starring Olga Chekhova, Alexej Bondireff and Ferdinand von Alten. The film's sets were designed by the art director Alexander Ferenczy. It premiered at the Marmorhaus in Berlin.

== Synopsis ==
Countess Clarissa Thalberg, in a passionless marriage to her much older husband, falls head over heels for a dashing aviator Baron Demeter von Thurzo she meets one day. She abandons her husband while he leaves his fiancée, leading to his father disowning him. The couple struggle financially and socially, as his conduct has led to him being shunned, and he makes heavily losses at the gaming tables. Clarissa is reduced to working as a clothes model in a fashion salon where she was once a valued customer, in order to support them. Her lover's father prepares a fresh attempt to get her to abandon his son by buying her off, but she heroically chooses to sacrifice her life saving another when a devastating fire hits the fashion house.

== Cast ==
- Olga Chekhova as Gräfin Clarissa Thalberg
- Alexej Bondireff as Graf Thalberg
- Ferdinand von Alten as Baron Demeter von Thurzo
- Arthur Pusey as Baron Alexander von Thurzo, sein Sohn
- Hedwig Pauly-Winterstein as Baronin Livia Széchenyi
- Ines Monlosa as Baronesse Lily Széchenyi
- Mignon Georgian as Ilonka
- Angelo Ferrari as Marchese di Terna
- Hans Albers as Abteilungsleiter im Warenhaus

== Bibliography ==
- Grange, William. Cultural Chronicle of the Weimar Republic. Scarecrow Press, 2008.
