= Ship Without a Harbour =

1932 film directed by Harry Piel

- French release poster
- Directed by: Harry Piel
- Written by: Werner Scheff
- Produced by: Harry Piel
- Starring: Harry Piel; Trude Berliner; Charly Berger
- Cinematography: Ewald Daub
- Edited by: Alice Ludwig
- Music by: Fritz Wenneis
- Production company: Ariel Film
- Distributed by: Atlas-Filmverleih
- Release date: 25 December 1932
- Running time: 102 minutes
- Country: Germany
- Language: German

Ship Without a Harbour (German: Das Schiff ohne Hafen) is a 1932 German thriller film directed by Harry Piel and starring Piel, Trude Berliner and Charly Berger. The film was made at the Staaken Studios and at the Berlin Wintergarten. The film's sets were designed by Willi Herrmann. It was partly shot on location at the North German port of Bremerhaven.

== Cast ==
- Harry Piel as Seepolizist Klaus Hansen
- Ingrid Lindström as Kitty Korff, seine Frau
- Trude Berliner as Lilly Steffens
- Hans Lorenz as Steuermann Jochen Hübner, ihr Geliebter
- Eugen Rex as Seepolizist Martin
- Charly Berger as Seepolizist Behrendt
- Philipp Manning as Inspektor Burghardt
- Friedrich Kayßler as Chef der Seepolizei
- Paul Rehkopf as Kapitän
- Bruno Ziener as Theaterdirektor
- Erwin Fichtner as ein Kollege Hansens
- Maria Forescu as Lokalinhaberin
- Ida Krill as Aufwartefrau im Theater
- Klaus Seiwert as Kollege Hansens

== Bibliography ==
- Grange, William. Cultural Chronicle of the Weimar Republic. Scarecrow Press, 2008.
