= The Shot in the Sound Film Studio =

1930 film

- Directed by: Alfred Zeisler
- Written by: Rudolph Cartier; Egon Eis; Curt Siodmak
- Produced by: Alfred Zeisler
- Starring: Gerda Maurus; Harry Frank; Berthe Ostyn
- Cinematography: Werner Brandes
- Production company: UFA
- Distributed by: UFA
- Release date: 25 July 1930
- Running time: 73 minutes
- Country: Germany
- Language: German

The Shot in the Sound Film Studio (German: Der Schuß im Tonfilmatelier) is a 1930 German mystery thriller film directed by Alfred Zeisler and starring Gerda Maurus, Harry Frank and Berthe Ostyn. It was shot at the Babelsberg Studios in Potsdam. The film's sets were designed by the art directors Willi Herrmann and Herbert O. Phillips.

== Cast ==
- Gerda Maurus as Filmdiva
- Harry Frank as Hauptdarsteller
- Berthe Ostyn as Schauspielerin Saylor
- Erwin Kalser as Regisseur
- Paul Kemp as Aufnahmeleiter
- Erich Kestin as Regieassistent
- Ewald Wenck as Kameramann
- Ernst Behmer as Kameraassistent
- Friedrich Franz Stampe as Tonmeister
- Georg Schmieter as Oberbeleuchter Bahlke
- Eva Behmer as Cutterin
- Peter Illing as Arzt
- Hertha von Walther as Atelierbesucherin
- Robert Thoeren as Komparse Seemann
- Ilse Korseck as Komparsin
- Jens Keith as Choreograph
- Valeska Stock as Witwe Bollmann
- Ernst Stahl-Nachbaur as Kriminalrat Holzknecht
- Alfred Beierle as Kriminalkommissar Moeller
- Petta Frederik as Komparsin
- Robert Klein-Lörk as Beleuchter

== Bibliography ==
- Bock, Hans-Michael & Bergfelder, Tim. The Concise CineGraph. Encyclopedia of German Cinema. Berghahn Books, 2009.
- Klaus, Ulrich J. Deutsche Tonfilme: Jahrgang 1930. Klaus-Archiv, 1988.
- Weinstein, Valerie. Antisemitism in Film Comedy in Nazi Germany. Indiana University Press, 2019.
