= Herbert Körner =

German cinematographer (1902–1966)

- Born: 8 February 1902; Fürstenwalde, German Empire
- Died: 27 May 1966 (aged 64); West Berlin, West Germany
- Occupation: Cinematographer
- Years active: 1926–1959 (film)

Herbert Körner (8 February 1902 – 27 May 1966) was a German cinematographer.

== Selected filmography ==
- The Strange Case of Captain Ramper (1927)
- Life's Circus (1928)
- Mariett Dances Today (1928)
- Taxi at Midnight (1929)
- Spell of the Looking Glass (1932)
- The Hunter from Kurpfalz (1933)
- Stolen Wednesday (1933)
- You Are Adorable, Rosmarie (1934)
- Pappi (1934)
- Financial Opportunists (1934)
- What Am I Without You (1934)
- Forget Me Not (1935)
- My Life for Maria Isabella (1935)
- Family Parade (1936)
- Martha (1936)
- Woman's Love—Woman's Suffering (1937)
- Love Can Lie (1937)
- The Coral Princess (1937)
- White Slaves (1937)
- We Danced Around the World (1939)
- Sky Hounds (1942)
- When the Young Wine Blossoms (1943)
- The Appeal to Conscience (1949)
- When Men Cheat (1950)
- Wedding Night In Paradise (1950)
- Dark Eyes (1951)
- Not Without Gisela (1951)
- The Chaste Libertine (1952)
- Fritz and Friederike (1952)
- My Wife Is Being Stupid (1952)
- The Seven Dresses of Katrin (1954)
- My Leopold (1955)
- Love, Summer and Music (1956)
- Moonwolf (1959)

== Bibliography ==
- Giesen, Rolf. Nazi Propaganda Films: A History and Filmography. McFarland, 2003.
