= Never Trust a Woman (film) =

1930 film

- Directed by: Max Reichmann
- Written by: Curt J. Braun; Anton Kuh; Walter Reisch; Werner Scheff
- Starring: Richard Tauber; Paul Hörbiger; Werner Fuetterer; Maria Matray
- Cinematography: Reimar Kuntze; Charles Métain
- Music by: Paul Dessau
- Production company: Münchner Lichtspielkunst
- Distributed by: Bavaria Film
- Release date: 3 February 1930
- Running time: 90 minutes
- Country: Germany
- Language: German

Never Trust a Woman (German: Ich glaub nie mehr an eine Frau) is a 1930 German musical film directed by Max Reichmann and starring Richard Tauber, Paul Hörbiger and Werner Fuetterer. It was shot at the Bavaria Studios in Munich. It premiered on 3 February 1930. Five early sound-film prints are now known to have survived, though in very poor condition. The complete soundtrack on Tri-Ergon Discs, each synchronized to accompany one reel of the film, was discovered in 2015 and transferred to the Jewish Museum in Berlin. Austrian, Portuguese and Belgian prints were used to compile and digitize a complete version of the film in 2020.

== Cast ==
- Richard Tauber as Stefan
- Paul Hörbiger as Joachim
- Werner Fuetterer as Peter
- Maria Matray as Katja
- Agnes Schulz-Lichterfeld as Die Mutter
- Gustaf Gründgens as Jean
- Edith Karin as Rote Finna
- Sven Sandberg as Singer

== Bibliography ==
- Grange, William (2008). Cultural Chronicle of the Weimar Republic. Scarecrow Press. ISBN 978-0-8108-5967-8.
