= War in Peace =

1925 film directed by Carl Boese

- Directed by: Carl Boese
- Written by: Emanuel Alfieri
- Produced by: Arthur Bredow
- Starring: Trude Berliner; Hans Sternberg; Charles Willy Kayser
- Cinematography: Julius Reinwald
- Production company: Henny Porten-Froelich-Produktion
- Distributed by: Internationale Film-AG
- Release date: 30 March 1925
- Country: Germany
- Languages: Silent; German intertitles

War in Peace (German: Krieg im Frieden) is a 1925 German silent film directed by Carl Boese and starring Trude Berliner, Hans Sternberg, and Charles Willy Kayser.

The film's sets were designed by the art director Fritz Kraencke.

== Cast ==
- Alfred Walters as von Etvös, ungarischer General
- Trude Berliner as Ilka von Etvös - Tochter des Generals
- Lillibel Schroth as Lony, Ilkas Zofe
- Hans Sternberg as Kommerzienrat Heindorf
- Magda Elgen as Mathilde von Hochberg
- Alfred Krafft-Lortzing as Oskar - Gymnasiast
- Hermann Blaß as Bürgermeister Henkel
- Helene Voß as Sophie - seine robuste Ehehälfte
- Käte Kassner as Else
- Siegfried Berisch as Bommel - sein Gehilfe
- Wilhelm Chandron as General von Sonnenfels
- Charles Willy Kayser as Oberleutnant von Folgen
- Henri Peters-Arnolds as Leutnant von Reif Reiflingen
- Hugo Fischer-Köppe as Meyer - der strammste Unteroffizier der Armee
- Rudolf Maas as Fritz - Bursche bei Reif
- Else Reval as Minna - der Küchendragoner bei Heindorf
- Ernst A. Becker as Diener bei Heindorf
- Max Schreck as Apotheker

== Bibliography ==
- Gerhard Lamprecht. Deutsche Stummfilme, Volume 8.
