= Circus Life =

1931 film

- Directed by: Heinz Paul
- Written by: Paula Busch (book); Fritz Falkenstein
- Starring: Liane Haid; Oscar Marion; Trude Berliner
- Cinematography: Georg Bruckbauer; Viktor Gluck
- Music by: Ernst Erich Buder
- Production company: Haase-Film
- Distributed by: Haase-Film
- Release date: 20 February 1931
- Running time: 79 minutes
- Country: Germany
- Language: German

Circus Life (Austrian title, Zirkus Leben, German: Schatten der Manege) is a 1931 German mystery drama film directed by Heinz Paul, starring Liane Haid, Oscar Marion and Trude Berliner. It was shot at the Babelsberg Studios in Berlin and at the Zirkus Busch in the city. It was released in America in 1932.

== Synopsis ==
An acrobat has affairs with both Elvira Starke, who owns and runs the circus, and Kitty, who performs in an equestrian act. He is then shot dead and police investigate.

== Cast ==
- Liane Haid as Elvira Starke, Zirkusdirektrice
- Luigi Bernauer as Refaingesang
- Fred Bird Rhythmicans as Singer
- Oscar Marion as Oskar Haupt, Dompteur
- Trude Berliner as Kitty Rallay
- Rolf von Goth as Fred Rallay, ihr Bruder
- Karl Ludwig Diehl as Luftakrobat
- Walter Rilla as Morini. Kunstschütze
- Hermann Picha as Edorado, Clown
- Hermann Blaß as Lilienfeldt, Argent
- Valy Arnheim as Sprechstallmeister
- Rudolf Meinhard-Jünger as Chef der Mordkommission
- Georg H. Schnell as 1. Kriminalkommissar
- Heinrich Wilde as 2. Kriminalkommissar

== Bibliography ==
- Klaus, Ulrich J. Deutsche Tonfilme: Jahrgang 1931. Klaus-Archiv, 2006.
- Quinlan, David. The Illustrated Encyclopedia of Movie Character Actors. Harmony Books, 1986.
