= Kiki (1931 film) =

1931 film by Sam Taylor

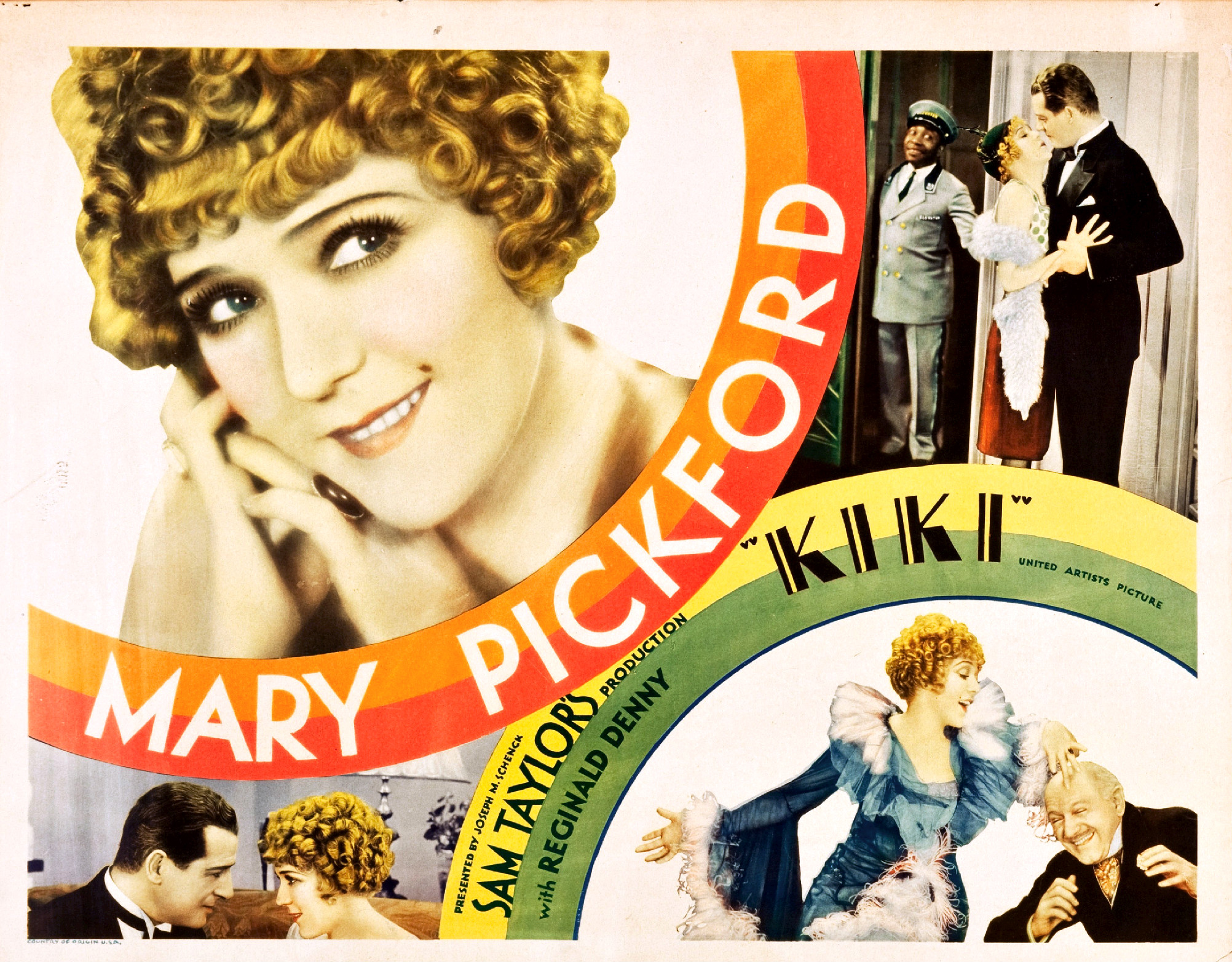
- Lobby card
- Directed by: Sam Taylor
- Written by: David Belasco (play); André Picard (play); Sam Taylor (screenplay)
- Produced by: Joseph M. Schenck
- Starring: Mary Pickford; Reginald Denny
- Cinematography: Karl Struss
- Music by: Alfred Newman
- Production company: Art Cinema
- Distributed by: United Artists
- Release date: March 14, 1931
- Running time: 84 minutes
- Country: United States
- Language: English
- Box office: $400,000

Kiki is a 1931 American pre-Code romantic comedy, starring Mary Pickford and Reginald Denny, which was directed by Sam Taylor. It was based upon the André Picard and David Belasco play of the same name. The film is a remake of the 1926 version starring Norma Talmadge.

== Plot ==
Kiki is a hapless French chorus girl who has just been fired from her job. She doesn't accept it and goes to see producer Victor Randall. He, however, is really busy and is annoyed by her presence. To get her out of his office, he promises her job back. Before she leaves, she drops her purse and clippings of Victor shaped in hearts fall out. It becomes clear Kiki is secretly in love with him.

When the next show becomes a disaster because of Kiki, she is again fired. She goes complaining at Victor Randall's office for the second time. He is now charmed by her and invites Kiki to his apartment. There, she notices a photo of his ex-wife Paulette Vaile. He kisses her, but she is insulted and slaps him. She hides in another room and makes clear she feels used and thinks Victor is still not over Paulette.

She eventually falls asleep in the room and finds a letter from Paulette the next morning. Although it's for Victor, she reads it. It says she is sorry about last night and wants to make up with Victor. Kiki becomes jealous and ruins the letter. Meanwhile, the servants are irritated by Kiki and try to get her out of Victor's apartment. Victor confronts her when the servants inform him Kiki has stolen a few of Paulette's letters. He eventually finds the letters and reads them.

Victor and Kiki have a conversation and flirt for the first time. Kiki becomes angry when Victor receives a phone call from Paulette and answers it. Paulette later visits Victor's apartment. Kiki is outraged and tells Paulette she is in love with Victor and intends to marry him. Victor catches Kiki intimidating and scaring Paulette and orders her to get out.

Victor and Paulette fall in love with each other again, but they find out Kiki hasn't left the apartment. Kiki pretends to be unconscious. Victor puts her in bed to rest and Kiki kisses him. He tells Paulette he can't leave Kiki alone. Paulette feels betrayed and leaves him. Victor and Kiki finally fall in love and kiss.

== Cast ==
- Mary Pickford as Kiki
- Reginald Denny as Victor Randall
- Joseph Cawthorn as Alfred Rapp
- Margaret Livingston as Paulette Vaile
- Phil Tead as Eddie
- Fred Walton as Bunson
- Edwin Maxwell as Dr. Smiley
- George Davis (uncredited)
- Betty Grable as Goldwyn girl (uncredited)
- Edmund Mortimer (uncredited)
- Fred Warren (uncredited)
- Blue Washington (uncredited)
- Dorothy White as Goldwyn girl (uncredited)

== Release ==
The film was released in 1931. New York Times film critic Mordaunt Hall credited the film for its comedy and characterizations of the stars in the movie; however longtime Pickford fans were not used to the loose adult role that the star traded for her earlier ingenuousness and it eventually flopped at the box office.

A copy of Kiki is preserved at the UCLA Film and Television Archive. It was released on DVD by Alpha Video on March 1, 2016, the last Mary Pickford talkie to be released. It was the first Mary Pickford film since the formation of United Artists to lose money.
