= A Thousand for One Night =

1933 film directed by Max Mack

- German: Tausend für eine Nacht
- Directed by: Max Mack
- Written by: Franz Arnold (play:Stöpsel); Ernst Bach (play:Stöpsel); Jacques Companéez; Herbert Juttke; Charlie Roellinghoff
- Produced by: Dagobert Koßmann
- Starring: Claire Rommer; Trude Berliner; Harald Paulsen
- Cinematography: Robert Lach
- Music by: Otto Stransky
- Production companies: Avanti-Tonfilm; UFA; Wolfram-Film
- Release date: 10 January 1933
- Running time: 79 minutes
- Countries: Czechoslovakia; Germany
- Language: German

A Thousand for One Night (German: Tausend für eine Nacht) is a 1933 Czech-German comedy film directed by Max Mack and starring Claire Rommer, Trude Berliner and Harald Paulsen. A separate Czech-language version was also produced.

The film's sets were designed by Erich Zander. The film was partly shot on location at the Czech spa resort of Marienbad which was then part of the German-speaking Sudetenland.

== Plot ==
Its plot concerns a German mother who is anxious for her daughter to marry an aristocrat rather than a jazz musician.

== Cast ==
- Claire Rommer as Erika Lauff, daughter
- Trude Berliner as Tanzsoubrette Ossy Walden
- Harald Paulsen as Frank Wellner, jazz musician
- Jakob Tiedtke as Jakob Lauff
- Johanna Terwin as Adele, his wife
- Eugen Jensen as Haberland, her friend
- Willy Stettner as Peter Stengel, his nephew
- F.W. Schröder-Schrom
- Alfred Gerasch
- Alexander Murski
- Kardosch-Sänger as Vocal group

== Bibliography ==
- Klaus, Ulrich J. Deutsche Tonfilme: Jahrgang 1933. Klaus-Archiv, 1988.
