= Raimondo Van Riel =

Italian actor (1881–1962)

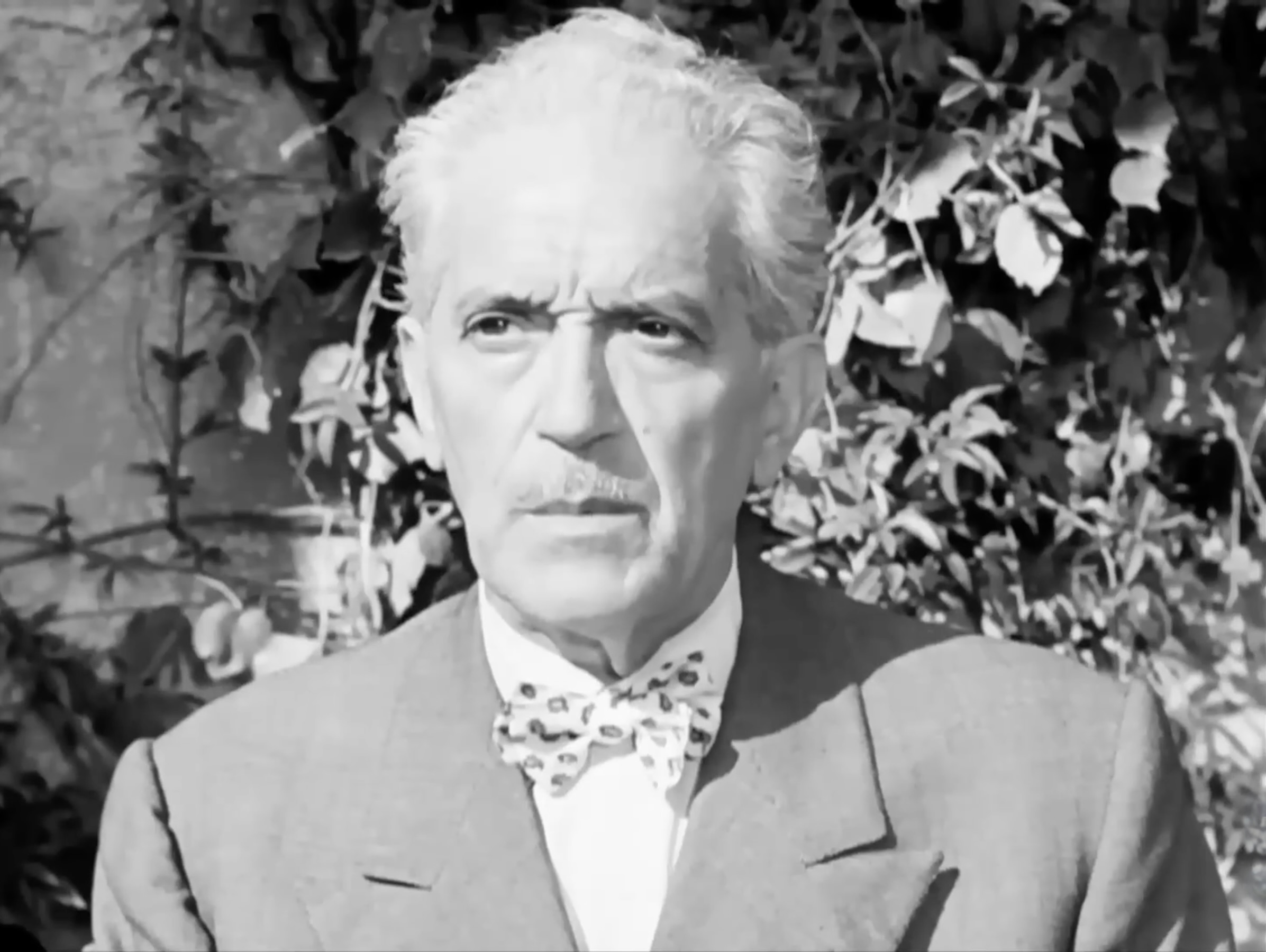
Van Riel in Welcome, Reverend! (1950)

Raimondo Van Riel (22 January 1881, in Rome – 9 May 1962, in Mentana) was an Italian actor.

Raimondo Van Riel was born on January 22, 1881, in Rome, Lazio, Italy. He is known for his work on Quo Vadis? (1924), The Magnificent Rogue (1935) and Scipione l'africano (1937). He was married to Aidé Bongini. He died on May 9, 1962, in Rome.

== Selected filmography ==
- Fiamma simbolica (1918)
- La ladra di fanciulli (1920)
- The Sack of Rome (1920)
- L'amica (1920)
- Primavera (1921)
- La morte piange, ride e poi... (1921)
- Le tre ombre (1921)
- The Youth of the Devil (1921)
- L'amico (1921)
- Un fiore nel fango (1921)
- La congrega dei ventiquattro (1921)
- Tre persone per bene (1922)
- La tormenta (1922)
- The Betrothed (1922)
- La madre folle (1923)
- Un viaggio nell'impossibile (1923)
- Quo Vadis? (1924) - Tigellinus
- Il cammino delle stelle (1924)
- 'Nfama! (1924)
- La giovinezza del diavolo (1925) - Il diavolo
- The Fiery Cavalcade (1925)
- Zigano (1925) - Herzog Ludowico
- Der Kampf gegen Berlin (1926) - William Tesborn
- Lives in Danger (1926) - Emilio Reval
- Risa e lacrime napoletane (1926) - Mimi'o Guappo
- Beatrice Cenci (1926)
- El moroso de la nona (1927)
- I rifiuti del Tevere (1927)
- The Golden Abyss (1927) - Ein Sträflingsanführer
- Behind the Altar (1927) - Becelli
- The Strange Case of Captain Ramper (1927)
- The Last Performance of the Circus Wolfson (1928) - Der Satan, Pantomime
- Escape from Hell (1928)
- Life's Circus (1928) - Gaston Flamingo
- Gaunerliebchen (1928) - Cremer
- Die Republik der Backfische (1928) - Thomas van Santen
- Knights of the Night (1928) - Mimile
- Das letzte Souper (1928) - Zemikoff
- Kif Tebbi (1928)
- Der Herzensphotograph (1928) - Ein Abenteuerer
- Dva pekelné dny (1928) - Dr. Van Straaten
- My Heart is a Jazz Band (1929) - Jack
- Misled Youth (1929) - Der 'Bananenpeter'
- Ship in Distress (1929) - Flavio, Marios Freund
- The Smuggler's Bride of Mallorca (1929) - Tolomeo
- The League of Three (1929) - Baramo
- Busy Girls (1930)
- You'll Be in My Heart (1930) - Krassow
- Die Jagd nach der Million (1930) - Baron Falcone
- Achtung! – Auto-Diebe! (1930) - Robert Radek
- Im Kampf mit der Unterwelt (1930) - Verbrecher
- Wellen der Leidenschaft (1930) - Mart Martens
- Before the Jury (1931) - Il procuratore generale
- Mother Earth (1931) - Un contadino nella taverna
- The Devil's Lantern (1931)
- Figaro and His Great Day (1931) - Un delegato di polizia
- Queen of the Night (1931) - Lo sconosciuto
- Patatrac (1931) - Il creditore alto
- Lorenzino de' Medici (1935) - Benvenuto Cellini
- Luci sommerse (1936)
- Scipio Africanus: The Defeat of Hannibal (1937) - Maharbale
- Blood Red Rose (1939)
- Two Million for a Smile (1939) - L'oste
- Il ponte dei sospiri (1940)
- Il leone di Damasco (1942)
- The Gorgon (1942) - Pietro Capronesi
- L'apocalisse (1947)
- Baron Carlo Mazza (1948) - Zio Casimiro Pezza
- Letter at Dawn (1948) - Paolo
- City of Pain (1948) - Don Felice
- Welcome, Reverend! (1950)
- Margaret of Cortona (1950) - messer Dal Monte
- First Love (1959) - Nonno di Andreina
- Esterina (1959)
- Ben Hur (1959) - Old Man (uncredited) (final film role)
