= The Republic of Flappers =

1926 film

- Directed by: Constantin J. David
- Written by: Axel Eggebrecht; Constantin J. David
- Starring: Käthe von Nagy; Raimondo Van Riel; Ernst Stahl-Nachbaur; Ernest Verne
- Cinematography: Mutz Greenbaum
- Production company: Greenbaum-Film
- Distributed by: Aafa-Film
- Release date: 15 October 1928
- Country: Germany
- Languages: Silent; German intertitles

The Republic of Flappers (German: Die Republik der Backfische) is a 1928 German silent comedy film directed by Constantin J. David and starring Käthe von Nagy, Raimondo Van Riel and Ernst Stahl-Nachbaur. The title refers to flappers.

== Cast ==
- Käthe von Nagy as Billie van Santen
- Raimondo Van Riel as Thomas van Santen
- Ernst Stahl-Nachbaur as John Enders
- Ernest Verne as Robert-Steffens
- Hermine Sterler as Fräulein Helmers
- Betty Mayfair as Baby
- Ilse Stobrawa as Alice
- Molly Stengrit as Molly
- Ruth Albu as Eva, ein Dienstmädchen
- Ernst Senesch as Ras-Ullah
- Max Schreck as Tulipan
- Karl Harbacher as Rosiman
- Michael von Newlinsky as Basiloff
- Alexander Murski as Der Chefredakteur
- Arthur Duarte as Ein junger Mann
- Daisy Lorand
- Tsching Fuh Won

== Bibliography ==
- Eickhoff, Stefan. Max Schreck: Gespenstertheater. Belleville, 2009.
