= You'll Be in My Heart (film) =

1930 film

- Directed by: Max Reichmann
- Written by: Friedrich Stein
- Produced by: Henry Blanke
- Starring: Camilla Horn; Fritz Schulz; Victor Varconi
- Cinematography: Frederik Fuglsang
- Production company: National Film
- Distributed by: National Film
- Release date: 23 February 1930
- Country: Germany
- Language: German

You'll Be in My Heart (German: Mein Herz gehört Dir...) is a 1930 German drama film directed by Max Reichmann and starring Camilla Horn, Fritz Schulz and Victor Varconi.

The film's sets were designed by the art director Hans Jacoby.

== Cast ==
- Camilla Horn as Diane D'Artois
- Fritz Schulz as Tjurkod
- Victor Varconi
- Werner Fuetterer as Marquis Duverge
- Olga Limburg as his daughter
- Raimondo Van Riel as Krassow
- Yvette Darnys as Yvonne Dupon
- Alexander Murski

== Bibliography ==
- Bock, Hans-Michael & Bergfelder, Tim. The Concise CineGraph. Encyclopedia of German Cinema. Berghahn Books, 2009.
