= Der Herzensphotograph =

1928 film

- Directed by: Max Reichmann
- Written by: Curt J. Braun
- Produced by: Max Reichmann
- Starring: Harry Liedtke; Robert Garrison; La Jana; Betty Bird
- Cinematography: Frederik Fuglsang; Hans Scheib
- Production company: Deutsche Film Union
- Distributed by: Deutsche First National Pictures
- Release date: December 1928
- Country: Germany
- Languages: Silent; German intertitles

Der Herzensphotograph (The Heart Photographer) is a 1928 German silent film directed by Max Reichmann starring Harry Liedtke and Robert Garrison and also with La Jana and Betty Bird. The film's art direction was by Andrej Andrejew.

== Cast ==
- Harry Liedtke as Peter, the assistant (the title character)
- Robert Garrison as Wendulin
- La Jana as Dodo - his daughter
- Betty Bird as Ilse, his daughter
- Raimondo Van Riel as an adventurer
- Else Reval as Yvette
- Edith Meinhard as Yvonne
- Walter Kubbilun as the apprentice
