= Transit Camp (film) =

1932 film

- Directed by: Max Reichmann
- Written by: Benno Vigny
- Starring: Ivan Koval-Samborsky; Berthe Ostyn; Meg Lemonnier
- Music by: Francis Gromon
- Production company: Les Studios Paramount
- Distributed by: Les Films Paramount
- Release date: 1932
- Running time: 84 minutes
- Countries: France; Germany
- Language: French

Transit Camp or Temporary Shelter (French: Camp volant) is a 1932 French-German drama film directed by Max Reichmann and starring Ivan Koval-Samborsky, Berthe Ostyn and Meg Lemonnier. It was made as a polyglot film with each actor speaking in their own language. It is set amongst the travelling circus community.

== Cast ==
- Ivan Koval-Samborsky as Marco
- Berthe Ostyn as Lydia
- Meg Lemonnier as Gloria
- Roberto Rey as Bobby Barnes
- Thomy Bourdelle as Cesare
- Lili Ziedner as Esmeralda
- Jeannie Luxeuil as Senta
- Lissy Arna
- Louis Lavata
- Jean Houcke
- Ilona Karolewna
- Barbara La May
- Eugène Stuber
- Pierre Sergeol
- Josef Breitbart

== Bibliography ==
- Crisp, Colin. Genre, Myth and Convention in the French Cinema, 1929-1939. Indiana University Press, 2002. ISBN 978-0-253-21516-1.
- Neale, Stephen. The Classical Hollywood Reader. Routledge, 2012.
