= My Heart is a Jazz Band =

1929 film

- German film poster
- German: Mein Herz ist eine Jazzband
- Directed by: Frederic Zelnik
- Written by: Curt J. Braun
- Starring: Lya Mara; Raimondo Van Riel; Heinrich Gotho; Charles Puffy
- Cinematography: Frederik Fuglsang; Paul Rischke
- Music by: Artur Guttmann
- Production company: Efzet Film
- Distributed by: Deutsche First National Pictures
- Release date: 28 January 1929
- Running time: 100 minutes
- Country: Germany
- Languages: Silent; German intertitles

My Heart is a Jazz Band (German: Mein Herz ist eine Jazzband) is a 1929 German silent drama film directed by Frederic Zelnik and starring Lya Mara, Raimondo Van Riel and Heinrich Gotho. The film's art direction was by Andrej Andrejew. It premiered on 28 January 1929. It shares its title with a popular 1920s song of the same name.

== Cast ==
- Lya Mara as Jessie
- Raimondo Van Riel as Jack
- Heinrich Gotho as Reggie
- Charles Puffy as Odyddeus
- Bobby Burns as Bobby
- Karl Harbacher as Worvester
- Lydia Potechina as Miss Betta
- Hermann Böttcher as Stanfield
- Michael von Newlinsky as Johnson
- Alfred Abel as Gellony
- Carl Goetz as Little Nick
- Ivan Koval-Samborsky as Jerry
