= Berthe Ostyn =

German actress

- Born: 23 February 1900; Aachen, German Empire
- Died: 29 May 1992 (aged 92); Perth, Australia
- Other names: Josephine Bertha Offermann; Bertha Ottow; Bertha Schultz; Berthe Shaw
- Occupation: Actress
- Years active: 1929-1934 (film)

Berthe Ostyn (23 February 1900 – 29 May 1992) was a German film actress active in the 1930s.

== Selected filmography ==
- The Night Belongs to Us (1929)
- The Blonde Nightingale (1930)
- The Shot in the Sound Film Studio (1930)
- The Great Longing (1930)
- The Son of the White Mountain (1930)
- Duty is Duty (1931)
- Headfirst into Happiness (1931)
- The Paw (1931)
- Everyone Asks for Erika (1931)
- I Go Out and You Stay Here (1931)
- Transit Camp (1932)
- Kiki (1932)
- The Champion Shot (1932)
- A City Upside Down (1933)

== Bibliography ==
- Goble, Alan. The Complete Index to Literary Sources in Film. Walter de Gruyter, 1999.
