= The Opera Ball =

1931 film directed by Max Neufeld

- Directed by: Max Neufeld
- Written by: Jacques Bachrach; Ida Jenbach; Max Neufeld
- Produced by: Herman Millakowsky
- Starring: Iván Petrovich; Liane Haid; Georg Alexander
- Cinematography: Otto Kanturek
- Edited by: Herbert Selpin
- Music by: Otto Stransky
- Production companies: Greenbaum Film; Münchner Lichtspielkunst
- Distributed by: Bavaria Film
- Release date: 26 July 1931
- Running time: 85 minutes
- Country: Germany
- Language: German

The Opera Ball (German: Opernredoute) is a 1931 German musical comedy film directed by Max Neufeld and starring Iván Petrovich, Liane Haid and Georg Alexander. It was shot at the Halensee Studios in Berlin. The film's sets were designed by the art directors Karl Weber and Erich Zander. It was part of a large group of operetta films made during the decade, although the film is not based on the operetta Der Opernball. The following year it was remade in French as Beauty Spot. A 1932 British remake After the Ball was also made.

== Cast ==
- Iván Petrovich as Dr. Peter v. Bodo
- Liane Haid as Helga Bodo, seine Frau
- Georg Alexander as Georg, sein bester Freund
- Otto Wallburg as von Arnolds - Helgas Vater
- Betty Bird as Vicky, die Zofe
- Irene Ambrus as Ilona Antalffy, die Tänzerin
- Maria Koppenhöfer as Tante Clementine
- Hermann Blaß
- Ludwig Stössel
- Hans Lipschütz

== Bibliography ==
- Grange, William (2008). Cultural Chronicle of the Weimar Republic. Scarecrow Press. ISBN 978-0-8108-5967-8.
