= End of the Rainbow (1930 film) =

1930 film

- Directed by: Max Reichmann
- Written by: Walter Forster; Paul Hörbiger
- Starring: Richard Tauber; Lucie Englisch; Sophie Pagay
- Cinematography: Reimar Kuntze
- Edited by: Jean Oser; Geza Pollatschik
- Music by: Paul Dessau
- Production company: Richard Tauber Tonfilm
- Distributed by: Bavaria Film
- Release date: 19 April 1930
- Running time: 95 minutes
- Country: Germany
- Language: German

End of the Rainbow (German: Das lockende Ziel) is a 1930 German musical film directed by Max Reichmann and starring Richard Tauber, Lucie Englisch and Sophie Pagay.

The film's sets were designed by Hans Jacoby.

== Cast ==
- Richard Tauber as Toni Lechner
- Maria Elsner as Cora Garden
- Sophie Pagay as Mutter Lechner
- Lucie Englisch as Leni
- Oskar Sima as Loisl
- Karl Elzer as Mannheimer - Manager
- Edith Karin
- Toni Tetzlaff
- Julius Falkenstein
- Karl Platen
- Karl Etlinger
- Gerhard Ritterband
- Fritz Rotter as Schlagerkomponist

== Bibliography ==
- Fawkes, Richard (2000). Opera on Film. London: Duckworth. ISBN 978-0-7156-2943-7.
