= A Girl from the Reeperbahn =

1930 film directed by Karl Anton

- German: Ein Mädel von der Reeperbahn
- Directed by: Karl Anton
- Written by: Karl Anton; Benno Vigny
- Produced by: Liddy Hegewald; Josef Stein
- Starring: Olga Chekhova; Trude Berliner; Hans Adalbert Schlettow
- Cinematography: Eduard Hoesch
- Edited by: Karl Anton
- Music by: Willy Engel-Berger (songs)
- Production companies: Hegewald Film; Sonor-Film
- Distributed by: Hegewald Film
- Release date: 16 December 1930
- Running time: 98 minutes
- Countries: Czechoslovakia; Germany
- Language: German

A Girl from the Reeperbahn (German: Ein Mädel von der Reeperbahn) is a 1930 Czech-German musical film directed by Karl Anton and starring Olga Chekhova, Trude Berliner, and Hans Adalbert Schlettow.

It was made in studios in the Czech capital Prague. Julius von Borsody worked on the film's set design. The film is set in a lighthouse on a small island and on the Reeperbahn, the nightlife area of the port city of Hamburg.

== Cast ==
- Olga Chekhova as Hanne Bull
- Trude Berliner as Margot
- Hans Adalbert Schlettow as Uwe Bull
- Josef Rovenský as Nemý Jens
- Manfred Koempel-Pilot as Sailor Pepito
- Antonin Fric as churchman
- Josef Kytka as bar visitor
