= I Go Out and You Stay Here =

1931 film

- Film poster
- German: Ich geh' aus und Du bleibst da
- Directed by: Hans Behrendt
- Written by: Wilhelm Speyer (novel); Hans H. Zerlett
- Produced by: Felix Pfitzner; Joe Pasternak
- Starring: Camilla Horn; Berthe Ostyn; Hermine Sterler
- Cinematography: Willy Goldberger
- Edited by: Andrew Marton
- Music by: Theo Mackeben; Otto Stransky
- Production company: Cicero Film
- Distributed by: Deutsche Universal-Film
- Release date: 9 April 1931
- Running time: 86 minutes
- Country: Germany
- Language: German

I Go Out and You Stay Here (German: Ich geh' aus und Du bleibst da) is a 1931 German comedy film directed by Hans Behrendt and starring Camilla Horn, Berthe Ostyn, and Hermine Sterler. A separate French-language film was also produced.

The film's sets were designed by the art director Willi Herrmann and Herbert O. Phillips.

== Cast ==
- Camilla Horn as Gaby, Mannequin
- Berthe Ostyn as Christa, Mannequin
- Hermine Sterler as Stephanie Derlett, Inhaberin eines Modesalons
- Hans Brausewetter as Georg, Fahrlehrer
- Fritz Ley as Walter, Bankbeamter
- Theodor Loos as Konstantin von Haller
- Oskar Sima as Maximilian von Wachmeister
- Margo Lion as Maria, Maximilians Frau
- Peter Wolff as Kadi, der 15jährige Sohn
- Max Gülstorff as Diener Tottleben
