= Kiki (1932 film) =

1932 film

- Directed by: Carl Lamac
- Written by: André Picard (play); Hans H. Zerlett
- Produced by: Carl Lamac; Anny Ondra
- Starring: Anny Ondra; Hermann Thimig; Berthe Ostyn
- Cinematography: Otto Heller
- Music by: Rolf Marbot; Bert Reisfeld
- Production companies: Ondra-Lamac-Film; Vandor Film
- Release date: 22 September 1932
- Countries: France; Germany
- Language: German

Kiki is a 1932 French-German musical comedy film directed by Carl Lamac and starring Anny Ondra, Hermann Thimig and Berthe Ostyn. It is based on the 1918 play Kiki by André Picard. The film's sets were designed by the art director Heinz Fenchel. A separate French-language version was made, also starring Ondra.

== Cast ==
- Anny Ondra as Kiki
- Hermann Thimig as Leroy – Theaterdirektor
- Berthe Ostyn as Cervinette
- Paul Otto as Baron Péron
- Willi Schaeffers as Arzt
- Josef Eichheim as Diener
- Edith Schultze-Westrum
- Edith d'Amara
- Walter Pittschau

== Bibliography ==
- Bock, Hans-Michael; Bergfelder, Tim, eds. (2009). The Concise Cinegraph: Encyclopaedia of German Cinema. New York: Berghahn Books. ISBN 978-1-57181-655-9.
