= Trude Berliner =

German actress (1903–1977)

- Born: Gertrude Berliner; 28 February 1903; Berlin, Germany
- Died: 26 February 1977 (aged 73); San Diego, California, U.S.
- Occupation: Actress
- Years active: 1916–1945

Trude Berliner (28 February 1903 – 26 February 1977) was a German actress. She was one of many Jewish actors and actresses who were forced to flee Europe when the Nazis came to power in 1933.

== Biography ==
Berliner was born Gertrude Berliner in Berlin, Germany]. She became a famous cabaret performer in Berlin. In 1925, she appeared in her first movie, a silent film called Krieg im Frieden. Berliner would wait four years before her second movie, but her film career would then take off. In 1929, she appeared in Dich hab ich geliebt, which would become the first German talkie released in the United States. Berliner appeared in a number of well known movies in Germany during the 1930s, including Masken, The Invisible Front, Großstadtnacht and Kaiserwalzer. Es war einmal ein Musikus (1933) was her last movie in Germany; it also featured S.Z. Sakall, in the fourth German movie that the two appeared in together.

Being Jewish, she left Germany when Hitler and the Nazi Party came to power in 1933 and went to France. In 1939, she immigrated to the United States. However, in Hollywood Berliner was not able to continue her promising movie career, receiving only bit roles in four movies. Her first role in an American film did not come until 1942, in Casablanca. She portrayed a woman playing baccarat with a Dutch banker (played by Torben Meyer). She appears in a scene with her four-time co-star from her career in Germany, S.Z. Sakall, when she says to his character, Carl the waiter, "Will you ask Rick if he will have a drink with us?", to which Carl responds, "Madame, he never drinks with customers. Never. I have never seen it."

Later that year, she had another bit part in the World War II romance Reunion in France, and in 1943 she played Frau Reitler in The Strange Death of Adolf Hitler. Her last American movie was a small uncredited role as a German actress in the musical The Dolly Sisters in 1945, again appearing with S.Z. Sakall. She did not appear on film again until 1955, with a small role in her final film, the West German production Before God and Man.

Berliner lived quietly in California until she died on February 26, 1977, in San Diego, just two days shy of her 74th birthday.

== Selected filmography ==
- Adamants letztes Rennen (1916) - Kind
- The Secret Agent (1924) - Zofe
- The Fire Dancer (1925)
- War in Peace (1925) - Ilka von Etvös - Tochter des Generals
- A Modern Casanova (1928) - Nina Ly
- Tempo! Tempo! (1929) - Mila
- The Circus Princess (1929)
- Hungarian Nights (1929)
- It's You I Have Loved (1929) - Edith Karin
- Marriage in Trouble (1929)
- Sturm auf drei Herzen (1930)
- Masks (1930)
- The Tiger Murder Case (1930) - Trude
- The Rhineland Girl (1930) - Grete
- Ein Walzer im Schlafcoupé (1930) - Lolo Marelli - Chansonette
- Pension Schöller (1930) - Fiffi
- The Singing City (1930) - Carmela - neapolitanisches Mädchen
- A Girl from the Reeperbahn (1930) - Margot
- Three Days of Love (1931) - Carla
- Circus Life (1931) - Kitty Rallay
- Every Woman Has Something (1931) - Olivia Dangerfield
- Ich heirate meinen Mann (1931) - Liane Colberg
- Der Stumme von Portici (1931) - Carmen
- Checkmate (1931) - Erika, Tänzerin
- My Heart Longs for Love (1931) - Elly Wallis
- Der verjüngte Adolar (1931) - Dodo Domani, Tänzerin
- Weekend in Paradise (1931) - Tutti, Animierdame
- Der Hochtourist (1931) - Lore Heller
- The Pride of Company Three (1932) - Vera, Stimmungssängerin
- Night Convoy (1932) - Spielklarissa
- Fräulein - Falsch verbunden (1932) - Lotte Schröder
- Durchlaucht amüsiert sich (1932) - Fifi
- Ein Prinz verliebt sich (1932)
- Modern Dowry (1932) - Molly Barun
- Die Zwei vom Südexpress (1932) - Marie
- Großstadtnacht (1932) - Juliette
- Ship Without a Harbour (1932) - Lilly Steffens
- The Invisible Front (1932) - Trude
- A Thousand for One Night (1933) - Tanzsoubrette Ossy Walden
- The Emperor's Waltz (1933) - Annemarie Schulz aus Berlin
- Es war einmal ein Musikus (1933) - Eva
- Casablanca (1942) - Baccarat Player at Rick's (uncredited)
- Reunion in France (1942) - Customer (uncredited)
- The Strange Death of Adolf Hitler (1943) - Frau Reitler
- The Dolly Sisters (1945) - German Actress (uncredited)
- Before God and Man (1955) - Frau Vikarin (final film role)
