= The Strange Case of Captain Ramper =

1927 film

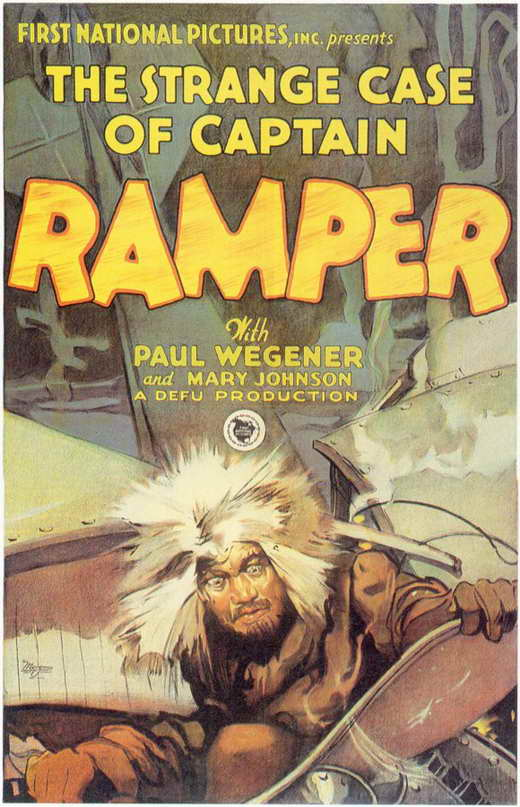
- Directed by: Max Reichmann
- Screenplay by: Curt Johannes Braun; Paul Wegener
- Based on: Ramper by Max Mohr
- Starring: Paul Wegener; Mary Johnson
- Cinematography: Friedrich Weinmann; Herbert Körner
- Music by: Walter Ulfig
- Production company: Deutsche Film-Union AG
- Release date: 31 October 1927 (Berlin)
- Country: Germany
- Language: Silent

The Strange Case of Captain Ramper (German: Ramper, der Tiermensch), released in the UK as In the Path of Peril, is a 1927 German silent film directed by Max Reichmann and starring Paul Wegener and Mary Johnson. It was produced by Defu Company of Berlin, an American production unit associated with First National Pictures, Inc. The rights to the film were acquired by First National Pictures in 1928 for copyright and distribution.

== Plot ==
Captain Ramper and his mechanic Charles Ipling set out on a daring flight to conquer the North Pole. Their aircraft is last seen over the furthest outposts of civilization before vanishing without a trace.

The pair crash-land in the frozen wilds of northern Greenland, their plane shattered and unusable. There, they discover the abandoned depot of an earlier expedition. Sustained by its remaining provisions, the two men endure brutal winters. But time stretches on, and hope fades. Ipling succumbs and dies; Ramper, shattered by isolation and grief, loses his mind. He becomes a creature of the Arctic, living like a beast among polar bears — howling, scavenging, forgotten.

Years later, a whaling ship The Polar Star, locked in Arctic ice, captures a strange man-like creature. They bring him back to Europe, where he is sold to a fairground showman, Chocolat. The creature is Ramper — no longer recognized as the famed aviator, but displayed like a sideshow beast.

Only one person can approach him without fear: Zizi, the gentle sister of the booth-owner Chocolat. Ramper, drawn to her with a deep and primal tenderness, obeys her every gesture. But Freddy, her devoted lover, grows uneasy about the strange connection between them.

At the fairground, psychiatrist Dr. Barbazin, accompanied by his assistant Doctor, visits out of curiosity. To his shock, he recognizes the "animal" as the long-lost Captain Ramper. Barbazin buys Ramper and takes him to his sanatorium, determined to awaken the human mind dormant beneath the savage mask. Slowly and miraculously, he succeeds.

Ramper, though healed in mind, finds himself spiritually alienated. The modern world — with its machines, its noise, its greed — horrifies him. He sees clearly the dehumanizing pace of progress. He cannot understand or accept it. Even Zizi, the one soft light in this new life, cannot love him — her heart belongs to Freddy.

When a charity fund is raised to support his rehabilitation, Ramper instead gives it to Zizi and Freddy, selflessly supporting their future together. He has no place in this world. Longing for the only peace he has ever known — the frozen solitude of the North — he signs aboard a whaling ship as a simple seaman. Ironically, it is the same vessel that once brought him out of the wilderness.

As the ship vanishes again into the white silence of the polar sea, Captain Ramper returns to the only life that made sense to him — far from men, back among the ice and the bears.

== Cast ==
Cast adapted from Michael Pitt's book Thrills Untapped and Filmportal.de.

- Paul Wegener as Captain Ramper
- Camillo Kossuth as Charles Ipling
- Kurt Gerron as Jim Chocolat
- Mary Johnson as Tony
- Hugo Döblin as The Doctor
- Georg Guertler as Freddy
- Max Schreck as The Thin One
- Hermann Vallentin as Barbazin
- Raimondo van Riel as The Captain of The Polar Star

== Production ==
The Strange Case of Captain Ramper was based on the play Ramper play by Max Mohr. The film's sets were designed by the art director Leopold Blonder.

== Release ==
The Strange Case of Captain Ramper was released in Berlin on October 31, 1927.

It was released in the United States by First National in 1928. On the film's American release, it was re-edited, with brief spoken prologues added about a dirigible catastrophe as the lead-in to the film's plot.

The film was believed to be a lost film, with only some fragmentary visual material remaining, but a 50 minute version under the original title "Ramper, der Tiermensch" has been uploaded to Youtube and is Public Domain due to its age. The closing sequence, of Ramper giving away the charity fund and returning to the North, is lost.

== Reception ==
From contemporary reviews, a reviewer in Variety found the film "somewhat better than the Contemporary German pictures seen on this side during the last season or two", but that it was also "draggy", concluding that the film was "fair to middling screen fare" and suggested it needed more editing. Photoplay described it simply as a "German picture with original plot. Just a bit heavy."
