= Leopold Blonder =

Austrian art director (1893-1932)

- Born: 1 July 1893; Vienna, Austro-Hungarian Empire
- Died: 20 September 1932 (aged 39); Innsbruck, Austria
- Occupations: Director, Art Director
- Years active: 1921-1932 (film )

Leopold Blonder (1893–1932) was an Austrian art director active in the silent and early sound eras. He also directed five short films during the early 1920s. He worked on several mountain films with Arnold Fanck and Leni Riefenstahl.

== Selected filmography ==
- The Mountaineers (1924)
- The Holy Mountain (1926)
- The Strange Case of Captain Ramper (1927)
- The Curse of Vererbung (1927)
- Knights of the Night (1928)
- Ariadne in Hoppegarten (1928)
- The Way Through the Night (1929)
- Two People (1930)
- Storm Over Mont Blanc (1930)
- Mountains on Fire (1931)
- White Ecstasy (1931)
- The Blue Light (1932)
- The Rebel (1932)
- The Dancer of Sanssouci (1932)

== Bibliography ==
- Rother, Rainer. Leni Riefenstahl: The Seduction of Genius. Bloomsbury Publishing, 2003.
