= Otto Stransky =

Austrian composer

- Born: 15 May 1889; Brno, Austria-Hungary
- Died: 23 November 1932 (aged 43); Berlin, Germany
- Occupation: Composer
- Years active: 1929–1932

Otto Stransky (15 May 1889 – 23 November 1932) was an Austrian composer. He worked in the German film industry for a number of years. He also composed a number of operettas. He died in 1932 following a car accident.

== Selected filmography ==
- His Majesty's Lieutenant (1929)
- Two Worlds (1930)
- The Blonde Nightingale (1930)
- Queen of the Night (1931)
- The Opera Ball (1931)
- A Night at the Grand Hotel (1931)
- The Night Without Pause (1931)
- I Go Out and You Stay Here (1931)
- The Testament of Cornelius Gulden (1932)
- This One or None (1932)
- Spies at the Savoy Hotel (1932)
- Grandstand for General Staff (1932)
- After the Ball (1932)
- The Telephone Operator (1932)
- Marion, That's Not Nice (1933)
- Model Wanted (1933)
- A Thousand for One Night (1933)
- There Goes Susie (1934)
