= Max Reichmann =

- Born: 29 November 1884; Strasbourg, German Empire
- Died: 3 February 1958 (aged 73); San Francisco, California; United States
- Occupation: Film director
- Years active: 1921–1933

Max Reichmann (1884–1958) was a German film director active during the silent and early sound eras. Before making his own films, Reichmann worked as an assistant director on several E.A. Dupont productions. After graduating to directing, he directed the tenor Richard Tauber in several films following the introduction of sound in the late 1920s.

Reichmann was Jewish, and was therefore forced to go into exile in France when the Nazi Party took power in Germany in 1933. He later emigrated to the United States, where he died in 1958. Reichmann left France in August 1935 and initially stayed in Havana, Cuba. In July 1937, Reichmann traveled to New York via Miami. He married there in 1938, and then moved to California . There he settled in Beverly Hills; there is no evidence of film activities in the USA despite its proximity to Hollywood. Reichmann was naturalized in 1943 and died 15 years later in San Francisco.

== Selected filmography ==
=== Director ===
- The Battle Against Berlin (1926)
- Derby (1926)
- The Strange Case of Captain Ramper (1927)
- Knights of the Night (1928)
- Life's Circus (1928)
- Weib in Flammen (1928)
- Der Herzensphotograph (1928)
- Never Trust a Woman (1930)
- End of the Rainbow (1930)
- How Do I Become Rich and Happy? (1930)
- You'll Be in My Heart (1930)
- The Land of Smiles (1930)
- The Big Attraction (1931)
- Transit Camp (1932)
- Bolero (1933)
- L'Apprenti Sorcier (1933)

=== Screenwriter ===
- The Flower Girl of Potsdam Square (1925)

== Bibliography ==
- Bock, Hans-Michael & Bergfelder, Tim. The Concise CineGraph. Encyclopedia of German Cinema. Berghahn Books, 2009.
