= Curt Johannes Braun =

German screenwriter (1903–1961)

- Born: 11 September 1903; Guttstadt, East Prussia, German Empire (now Dobre Miasto, Poland)
- Died: 5 June 1961 (aged 57); Munich, West Germany
- Occupation: Screenwriter
- Years active: 1922–1959

Curt Johannes Braun (11 September 1903 – 5 June 1961) was a German screenwriter.

== Selected filmography ==
- The Tower of Silence (1924)
- The Woman without Money (1925)
- The Wooing of Eve (1926)
- Hunted People (1926)
- The Man in the Fire (1926)
- Derby (1926)
- Lives in Danger (1926)
- The Armoured Vault (1926)
- Chance the Idol (1927)
- The Strange Case of Captain Ramper (1927)
- The Prisoners of Shanghai (1927)
- Alpine Tragedy (1927)
- Miss Chauffeur (1928)
- Life's Circus (1928)
- The Last Fort (1928)
- The House Without Men (1928)
- Der Ladenprinz (1928)
- The Secret Courier (1928)
- Der Herzensphotograph (1928)
- Ariadne in Hoppegarten (1928)
- The Saint and Her Fool (1928)
- The Night of Terror (1929)
- My Heart is a Jazz Band (1929)
- The Call of the North (1929)
- The Three Kings (1929)
- The Green Monocle (1929)
- Latin Quarter (1929)
- Never Trust a Woman (1930)
- Helene Willfüer, Student of Chemistry (1930)
- The Copper (1930)
- The King of Paris (1930, French)
- The King of Paris (1930, German)
- The Land of Smiles (1930)
- Without Meyer, No Celebration is Complete (1931)
- The Big Attraction (1931)
- The Unknown Guest (1931)
- Checkmate (1931)
- Marriage with Limited Liability (1931)
- No More Love (1931)
- The Black Hussar (1932)
- The Four from Bob 13 (1932)
- The Ladies Diplomat (1932)
- The Heath Is Green (1932)
- The Mad Bomberg (1932)
- The Fugitive from Chicago (1933)
- The Peak Scaler (1933)
- The Little Crook (1933)
- Inge and the Millions (1933)
- Financial Opportunists (1934)
- Love and the First Railway (1934)
- Little Dorrit (1934)
- The Double (1934)
- Between Two Hearts (1934)
- Black Roses (1935)
- Romance (1936)
- Stronger Than Regulations (1936)
- The Castle in Flanders (1936)
- Winter in the Woods (1936)
- Serenade (1937)
- The Ruler (1937)
- You and I (1938)
- The Merciful Lie (1939)
- My Daughter Lives in Vienna (1940)
- Goodbye, Franziska (1941)
- Bismarck's Dismissal (1942)
- Secret File W.B.1 (1942)
- My Friend Josephine (1942)
- The Thing About Styx (1942)
- Don't Talk to Me About Love (1943)
- Das Mädchen Juanita (1945)
- Arlberg Express (1948)
- Dear Friend (1949)
- Torreani (1951)
- The Bird Seller (1953)
- The Last Waltz (1953)
- The Immortal Vagabond (1953)
- Baron Tzigane (1954)
- On the Reeperbahn at Half Past Midnight (1954)
- Son of St. Moritz (1954)
- The Angel with the Flaming Sword (1954)
- The Gypsy Baron (1954)
- Secrets of the City (1955)
- Stresemann (1957)
- At the Green Cockatoo by Night (1957)
- Spring in Berlin (1957)
- Victor and Victoria (1957)
- The Copper (1958)
- Peter Voss, Thief of Millions (1958)
- Peter Voss, Hero of the Day (1959)
- Paradise for Sailors (1959)
