= Alexander Murski =

German actor

- Born: Alexander Alexandrovich Murski; 1 November 1869; Saint Petersburg, Russia
- Died: April 1943 (aged 74); Toulouse, France
- Occupation: Actor
- Years active: 1924-1943

Alexander Alexandrovich Murski (Russian: Александр Александрович Мурский) (1 November 1869 – April 1943) was a Russian-born German actor. Murski died in 1943 in Toulouse, Haute-Garonne, France.

Murski known for his acting in The Hound of the Baskervilles (1929), Michael (1924) and Zwei Kinder (1924).

He was occasionally credited with the names Alexander Mursky and Aleksandr Murskij.

== Selected filmography ==
- Zaida, the Tragedy of a Model (1923)
- Michael (1924)
- Comedy of the Heart (1924)
- Two Children (1924)
- The Blackguard (1925)
- The Adventure of Mr. Philip Collins (1925)
- The Telephone Operator (1925)
- The Island of Dreams (1925)
- The Found Bride (1925)
- Love is Blind (1926)
- State Attorney Jordan (1926)
- The Son of Hannibal (1926)
- His Toughest Case (1926)
- Mata Hari (1927)
- A Murderous Girl (1927)
- The Queen of Spades (1927)
- Homesick (1927)
- The False Prince (1927)
- The Famous Woman (1927)
- Linden Lady on the Rhine (1927)
- Luther (1928)
- Rasputins Liebesabenteuer (1928)
- The Republic of Flappers (1928)
- Parisiennes (1928)
- Sajenko the Soviet (1928)
- Two Red Roses (1928)
- Life's Circus (1928)
- Eva in Silk (1928)
- Hungarian Nights (1929)
- Fräulein Else (1929)
- The Man with the Frog (1929)
- The Circus Princess (1929)
- His Majesty's Lieutenant (1929)
- The Hound of the Baskervilles (1929)
- The Man Without Love (1929)
- The White Devil (1930)
- Cyanide (1930)
- You'll Be in My Heart (1930)
- Chasing Fortune (1930)
- Johann Strauss (1931)
- Everyone Asks for Erika (1931)
- The Case of Colonel Redl (1931)
- In the Employ of the Secret Service (1931)
- The Unfaithful Eckehart (1931)
- Rasputin, Demon with Women (1932)
- A Thousand for One Night (1933)

== Bibliography ==
- Bordwell, David. The Films of Carl Theodor Dreyer. University of California Press, 1992.
- Eisner, Lotte H. The Haunted Screen: Expressionism in the German Cinema and the Influence of Max Reinhardt. University of California Press, 2008.
