= Sanin (novel) =

Novel by Mikhail Artsybashev

Sanin (Russian: Санин) is a novel by the Russian writer Mikhail Artsybashev.

The book was written in 1907, at a time of substantial political reaction to enormous changes in Russian society (democratic activities, first democratically elected Duma in 1906, as well as the Russian Revolution of 1905). It was banned on the grounds of pornography and blasphemy in 1908, which prevented further publication but did not immediately restrict the serialized version nor anything already published. When Artsybashev emigrated to Poland after the Russian Revolution of 1917, he was condemned by the Soviet authorities and his books were banned from publication. They were revived in the 1990s.

== Plot summary ==
Though the book starts with Vladimir Sanin's return to his family home, mother and sister, the plot largely follows Lida Sanina, Sanin's younger, socialite sister, and Yuri Svarogitsch, a previous student who has been removed from university following his involvement in revolutionary activities. The two share a group of friends who, together, explore concepts of sexuality, social pressure and revolution, as well as life and death as fellow student Semenov battles with the fatal sentence of consumption.

Sanin often takes a background role in his own book and shows up most often to discuss various philosophies. In one instance, Sanin states that "Desire is everything. When a man's desires cease, his life ceases, too, and if he kills his desires, he kills himself," a position that is a throughline in the book, emphasizing themes of personal freedom, no matter if those desires are objectively good or evil — something that is clearly found in Sanin himself as he acts as both a morally progressive backbone for the book and a character who indulges in several injurious desires, like the constant, incestual pursuit of his sister and the sexual assault of her friend.

Characters wrestle with and spar by using a variety of in-vogue philosophies, including egoism, nihilism, Tolstoyanism, Christianity, utopian socialism, and middlebrow morality. One of the characters reaches a point where he admits "that life was the realization of freedom, and consequently that it was natural for a man to live for enjoyment". Lida feels conflicts between her internalization of society's condemnation of premarital sex and her more spontaneous conclusion that "I wanted to do it and I did it; and I felt so happy."

Sanin focuses much of its attention on sex and the sexuality of youth, and the novel puts forth several strikingly feminist ideals on female sexual freedom. When Sanin discovers that his sister, Lida, is pregnant while unmarried, he urges her to get an abortion on the grounds that women face unfair persecution in comparison to men and deserve to choose to abort a child the same way women who are endangered by childbirth have a right to abortion. There are also many depictions of sex as characters understand their own sexual urges and what urges they are and not comfortable enacting, whether it is a matter of morals or preference.

== Critical reception ==
Colin Wilson wrote about Sanin:

"The book's hero sneers at the unhealthy moral preoccupations of most Russians, and preaches a doctrine of sunlight and frank sensuality. The book had an enormous impact on Russian youth, who were eager to put its doctrines into practice. Probably no book in world literature has been responsible for the loss of so many maidenheads."

Wilson added that Sanin deserves more study in English.

According to Czech scholar and president Tomas Masaryk, "Saninism" absorbed some of the energy that tsarist repression prevented from expressing itself politically, inspiring a "crude hedonism" in a "section of the intelligentsia" and prompting the formation of student societies promoting "free love." Otto Boele, however, has argued that alarm over young people becoming "saninstvos" was exaggerated by the tsarist regime. While Sanin details sex more graphically than the average novel at that time, there were other sentiments that went against the government's current interests, and Sanin does not explain sex enough for it to be pornographic in nature. It wasn't until the 1980s that critics began to look at Sanin's other themes and analyze the hero's progressive dreams as well as his glaring faults and what that meant for the novel in a bigger scheme.

The novelty of Sanin lies in its insertion of progressive and liberal thoughts and ideals in the literary form of a novel. Critics in 1907 and later in the Russian SFSR were furious to find such views as Sanin's in existence. They put their efforts to discrediting the book, whose references to the Bible, Shakespeare, Dickens, Dostoevsky, Nietzsche, and whose precipitation of the dramatic changes in the morality and political life of the following decades were, in their view, dangerous for the Russian people.

Sanin was translated into English by Percy Edward Pinkerton in 1910.
