= Mikhail Artsybashev =

Russian writer and playwright

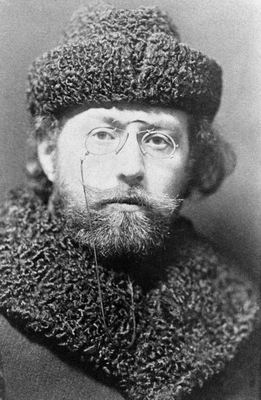
- Born: November 5, 1878; Kharkov, Russian Empire
- Died: March 3, 1927 (aged 48); Warsaw, Poland
- Children: Boris Artzybasheff
- Writing career
- Period: 1900s-1920s
- Genres: Fiction, drama
- Literary movement: Naturalism

Mikhail Petrovich Artsybashev (Russian: Михаи́л Петро́вич Арцыба́шев; Polish: Michał Arcybaszew; Ukrainian: Михайло Петрович Арцибашев; November 5, 1878 – March 3, 1927) was a Russian writer and playwright, and a major proponent of the literary style known as naturalism. He was the great-grandson of Tadeusz Kościuszko and father of Boris Artzybasheff, who emigrated to the United States and became famous as an illustrator. Following the Russian Revolution, in 1923 Artsybashev emigrated to Poland, where he died in 1927.

== Biography ==
=== Early life ===
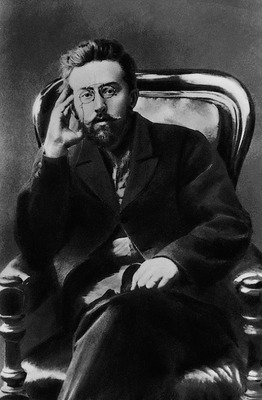
Artsybashev, c. 1905.

Artsybashev was born in khutor Dubroslavivka, Okhtyrka county, Kharkov Governorate (currently Sumy Oblast, Ukraine). His father was a small landowner and a former officer. His mother, who was Polish, died of tuberculosis when he was only three years old. His other ethnic roots included French, Georgian and Tatar. He attended school in Okhtyrka until the age of 16. From 1895 to 1897 he was an office worker. He studied at the Kharkov School of Drawing and Art (1897–98). During this time he lived in poverty, and was often unable to buy art supplies. In 1897 he attempted suicide. In 1898 he married Anna Vasilyevna Kobushko, with whom he had his son Boris. The couple separated in 1900.

=== Career ===
In 1898 he relocated to Saint Petersburg, where he worked as a freelance journalist, and published humorous stories. In 1901 he was expelled from the city for taking part in a demonstration. He wrote his first important work of fiction, the story Pasha Tumanov in 1901, but was unable to publish it until 1905 due to its being banned by the censor.

He considered his novel The Death of Ivan Lande (1904) to be his best work, but his major success was the novel Sanin (1907), which scandalized his Russian readers and was prohibited in many countries. He wrote Sanin in 1903, but was unable to publish it until 1907, again due to censorship. The protagonist of the novel ignores all social conventions and specializes in seducing virgin country girls. In one notorious scene, a girl tries to wash embarrassing white stains off her dress after sexual intercourse with Sanin, an incident omitted from the 1914 English version. The novel was written under the influence of the philosophy of Max Stirner, and was meant to expound the principles of Individualist anarchism.

Artsybashev said the following in regard to his development as a writer:

"My development was very strongly influenced by Leo Tolstoy, although I never shared his views on non-resistance to evil. As an artist he overpowered me, and I found it difficult not to model my work on his. Fyodor Dostoyevsky, and to a certain extent Anton Chekhov, played almost as great a part, and Victor Hugo and Johann Wolfgang von Goethe were constantly before my eyes. These five names are those of my teachers and literary masters."

In a 1913 interview he gave his views on literature:

"Common sense, consistency, argumentation, a clear and concrete idea of one's subject that constitutes the plot of the work, a thoughtful evaluation of the phenomena introduced in the novel, clarity and concreteness—these are the things I demand of a literary work."

He made this comment concerning Friedrich Nietzsche:

"It is often thought here (in Russia) that Nietzsche exercised a great influence over me. This surprises me, for the simple reason that I have never read Nietzsche. This brilliant thinker is out of sympathy with me, both in his ideas and in the bombastic form of his works, and I have never got beyond the beginnings of his books. Max Stirner is to me much nearer and more comprehensible."

=== Later life ===
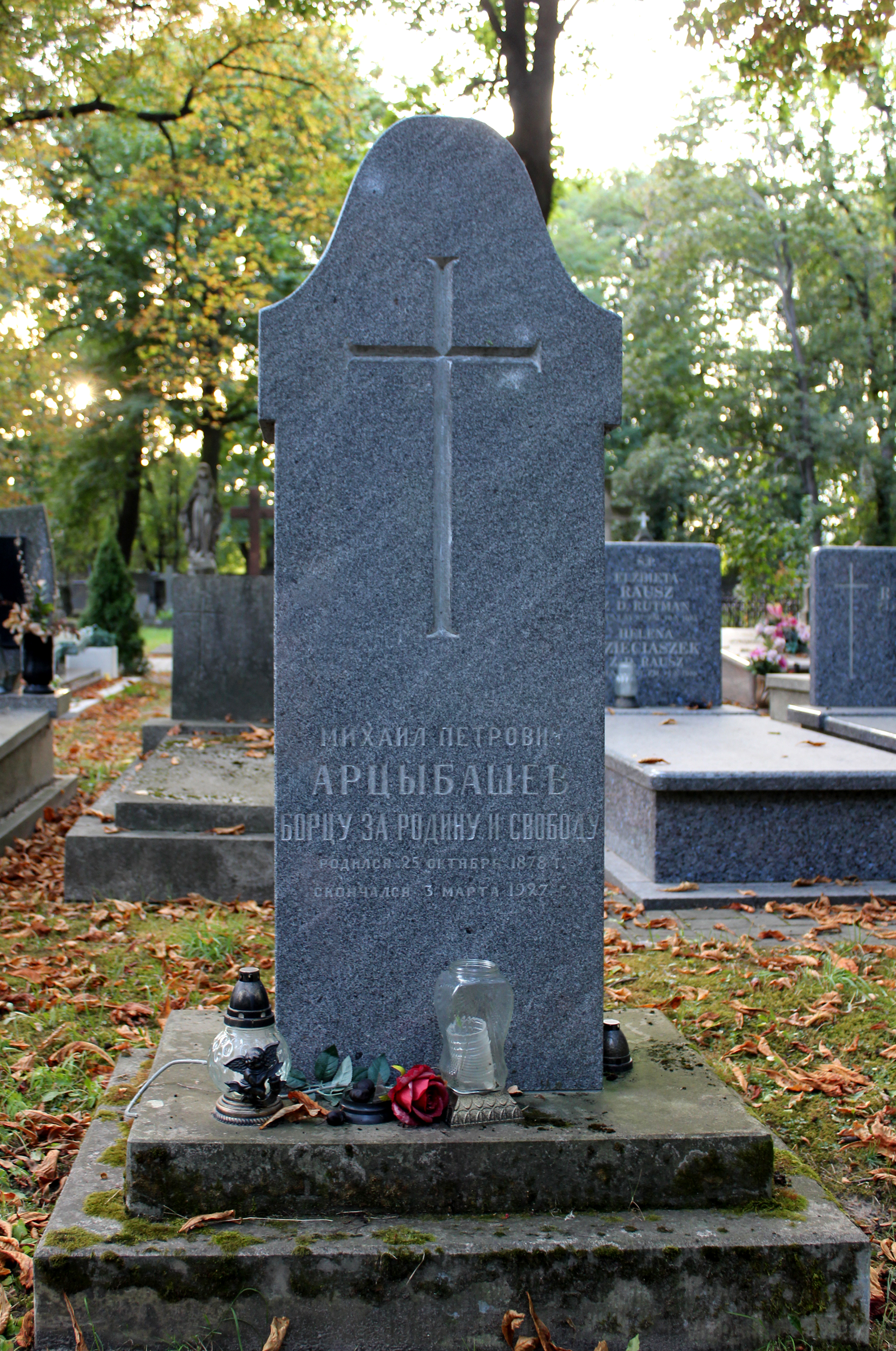
The grave of M. Artsybashev in Warsaw, 2023; fot. Ivonna Nowicka

Artsybashev moved to Moscow in 1912. In 1917–18 he published his anti-Bolshevik work Notes of a Writer. In 1923 he emigrated to Poland as an optant (his mother was Polish), where he edited the newspaper For Liberty! (За свободу!). He was an irreconcilable enemy of the Bolshevik regime, and Soviet critics dubbed the novels of his followers saninstvo and artsybashevchina (both terms are considered derogatory). He died in Warsaw on March 3, 1927, from tuberculosis and was buried at the Orthodox Cemetery in Warsaw.

== English translations ==
- The Millionaire, Ivan Lande, and Nina, (stories/short novels), B.W. Huebsch, NY, 1915. from Archive.org
- The Revolutionist, (story), from Best Russian Short Stories, Boni and Liveright, 1917. from Archive.org
- Tales of the Revolution, (stories/short novels), B.W. Huebsch, NY, 1917. from Archive.org
- The Jew, (story), from The Shield, Alfred A. Knopf, NY, 1917. from Archive.org
- War, (play), Grant Richards LTD, London, 1918. from Archive.org
- Breaking Point, (novel), B.W. Huebsch, NY, 1920. from Archive.org
- Sanin, (novel). from Gutenberg.org
