= 1950 in Germany =

Events in the year 1950 in West Germany and East Germany.

== Incumbents ==
=== West Germany ===
- President – Theodor Heuss
- Chancellor – Konrad Adenauer

=== East Germany ===
- First Secretary of the Socialist Unity Party – Walter Ulbricht
- President – Wilhelm Pieck
- Minister-President – Otto Grotewohl

== Events ==
- April 30 - The last Ration stamps (for sugar) expire in West Germany; In the GDR, food stamps were still in use until 1958.
- June 5 - German broadcaster ARD started.
- July 6 - Treaty of Zgorzelec was signed between the Republic of Poland and East Germany (GDR).
- July 19 - The Central Council of Jews in Germany is founded.
- August 5 - Publication of the Charter of German Expellees.
- September 7 - Schwarzwaldmädel, the first German color film after the end of the war, premieres in Stuttgart. It ushers in an era of local film in West Germany.
- September 19 - At the conference of foreign ministers of the three Western powers in New York, the federal government in Bonn was recognized as the only “free and legally constituted” government in Germany.
- October 5–9 - Himmerod memorandum
- October 19 - East German general election, 1950

== Births ==
- January 9 - Rio Reiser, singer (died 1996)
- January 21 - Marion Becker, athlete
- January 22 - Werner Schulz, politician (died 2022)
- January 27 - Ulrich Deppendorf, journalist
- January 30 - Reinhold Kauder, canoeist
- February 2 - Barbara Sukowa, actress
- February 8 - Manfred Milinski, biologist
- March 6 - Felix Genn, German bishop of Roman Catholic Church
- March 12 – Traudl Treichl, German alpine skier
- March 22 - Hugo Egon Balder, actor and comedian
- March 22 - Herman Weigel, German film producer
- April 25 - Peter Hintze, German politician (died 2016)
- April 30 - Christine Hohmann-Dennhardt, German judge
- May 12 - Renate Stecher, athlete
- May 16 - Georg Bednorz, physicist
- May 18 - Thomas Gottschalk, actor and television presenter
- May 26 - Werner Bergmann, sociologist
- May 31 - Christine Kurzhals, politician (died 1998)
- June 15 - Heidi Schüller, long jumper
- June 16 - Klaus Lage, singer
- June 21 - Ferdinand Kirchhof, judge
- June 20 - Gudrun Landgrebe, actress
- July 7 - Gerda Hasselfeldt, politician
- July 27- David Storl, track and field athlete who specialises in the shot put
- August 5 - Rosi Mittermaier, alpine ski racer (died 2023)
- August 12 – Iris Berben, actress
- September 2 - Michael Rother, musician
- September 23 - Dietmar Lorenz, judoka (died 2021)
- October 13 - Annegret Richter, athlete
- October 28 - Annette Humpe, singer
- November 10 - Bernd-Ulrich Hergemöller, historian (died 2023)
- November 17 - Roland Matthes, swimmer (died 2019)
- November 28 - Hans Fassnacht, swimmer

== Deaths ==
- 8 February - Arthur Kampf, German painter (born 1864)
- 9 February - Franz Justus Rarkowski, German bishop of Roman-Catholic Church (born 1873)
- 12 February — Max Beckmann, German painter, draftsman, printmaker, sculptor and writer (born 1884)
- 3 March - Eugen Klöpfer, German actor (born 1886)
- 11 March - Heinrich Mann, German writer (born 1871)
- 3 April - Kurt Weill, German composer (born 1900)
- 22 April - Günther Rüdel, German general (born 1883)
- 27 April — Karl Straube, German organist (born 1873)
- 2 May — Paul Eugen Sieg, physicist and writer (born 1899)
- 3 May — August Marahrens, German Protestant bishop who served as Landesbischof of the Evangelical-Lutheran Church of Hanover (born 1875)
- 29 May — Wilhelm Bendow, German actor (born 1884)
- 29 June — Melitta Bentz, German inventor and entrepreneur (born 1873)
- 1 September - Fritz Kampers, German actor (born 1891)
- 10 October - Josef Straßberger, German weightlifter (born 1894)
- 1 November - Heinrich Tessenow, German architect (born 1876)
- 2 November - Kurt Schmitt, German economic leader and the Reich Economy Minister (born 1886)
- 8 November — Carl Wilhelm Erich Zimmer, German zoologist (born (1873)
- 30 November - Werner Haase, German surgeon (born 1900)
- 21 December - Konrad von Preysing, German prelate of Roman-Catholic Church (born 1880)
- 27 December — Max Beckmann, German painter, draftsman, printmaker, sculptor and writer (born 1884)
