= Max Terpis =

Swiss dancer, choreographer, director and psychologist

Max Terpis, né Max Pfister, also Max Pfister-Terpis, (1 March 1889 in Zürich – 18 March 1958 in Zollikon) was a Swiss dancer, choreographer, director and psychologist.

== Publications ==
- Tanz und Tänzer (1946)

== Filmography ==
- Marriage

== Bibliography ==
- Robert Heiß, Hildegard Hiltmann (editor): Der Farbpyramiden-Test nach Max Pfister. Huber, Bern 1951.
- Wolfgang Martin Schede: Farbenspiel des Lebens. Max Pfister Terpis. Architekt Tänzer Psychologe 1889–1958. Atlantis, Zürich 1960.
- Elisa Frasson: Max Terpis, Tanz und Tänzer. Dissertation. Universität Venedig 2005, OCLC 601339304.
- Bernd-Ulrich Hergemöller, Klaus Sator: Terpis, Max. In: Bernd-Ulrich Hergemöller (editor): Mann für Mann. Biographisches Lexikon zur Geschichte von Freundesliebe und mannmännlicher Sexualität im deutschen Sprachraum. Part 2: Rat–Z. Lit, Münster 2010, ISBN 978-3-643-10693-3, p. 1165. (Google books).
