= Sieg =

Sieg may refer to:

- Sieg, German for victory
- Sieg, alternative form of Sig (given name)

== People ==
- Carl Sieg (1784–1845), German painter and lithographer
- Victor Sieg (1837–1899), French composer and organist
- Lee Paul Sieg (1879–1963), a former president of the University of Washington
- Paul Eugen Sieg (1899–1950), German physicist and writer
- John Sieg (1903–1942), railroad worker and journalist who publicized Nazi atrocities
- Jack Sieg (1914–1968), American swimmer who used the butterfly stroke in 1935
- Edward Chan Sieg (1928–2007), American director, photographer and writer
- Shane Sieg (1982–2017), NASCAR driver
- Ryan Sieg (born 1987), NASCAR driver
- Trent Sieg (born 1995), American football long snapper
- Kyle Sieg (born 2001), NASCAR driver

== Other ==
- Sieg Railway, Germany
- Sieg automatic rifle
- Sieg (river), a tributary of the Rhine in Germany

== See also ==
- Sieg Heil
