= Hermann Plüddemann =

German painter

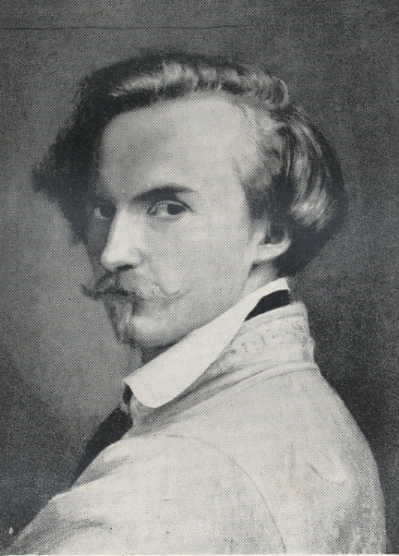
Hermann Plüddemann (artist unknown)

Hermann Friedhold Plüddemann (17 July 1809, Kolberg – 24 June 1868, Dresden) was a German history painter and illustrator.

== Life and work ==
His father was a prosperous merchant and shipowner. He initially studied with Carl Sieg in Magdeburg then, in 1828, he entered the studios of Carl Joseph Begas in Berlin. Three years later, he enrolled at the Kunstakademie Düsseldorf, where he worked with Friedrich Wilhelm von Schadow.

Together with Heinrich Mücke, he completed a number of frescoes for Count Franz von Spee at Heltorf Castle, including a monumental representation of the Battle of Iconium; from sketches by Karl Friedrich Lessing. In 1843, together with Mücke, Lorenz Clasen and Joseph Fay, he was chosen to create frescoes depicting the early history of the Germans, up to the Battle of the Teutoburg Forest, at the Altes Elberfelder Rathaus.

He moved to Dresden in 1848, to become a professor at the Academy of Fine Arts. From 1852 to 1856, he was almost exclusively occupied in creating illustrations for a book of German ballads by Georg Wigand, and German History in Pictures, published by C. C. Meinhold & Söhne. He was best known for his series of paintings depicting the lives of Christopher Columbus and Frederick Barbarossa. Much of his work was lost during World War II.

== Selected illustrations ==
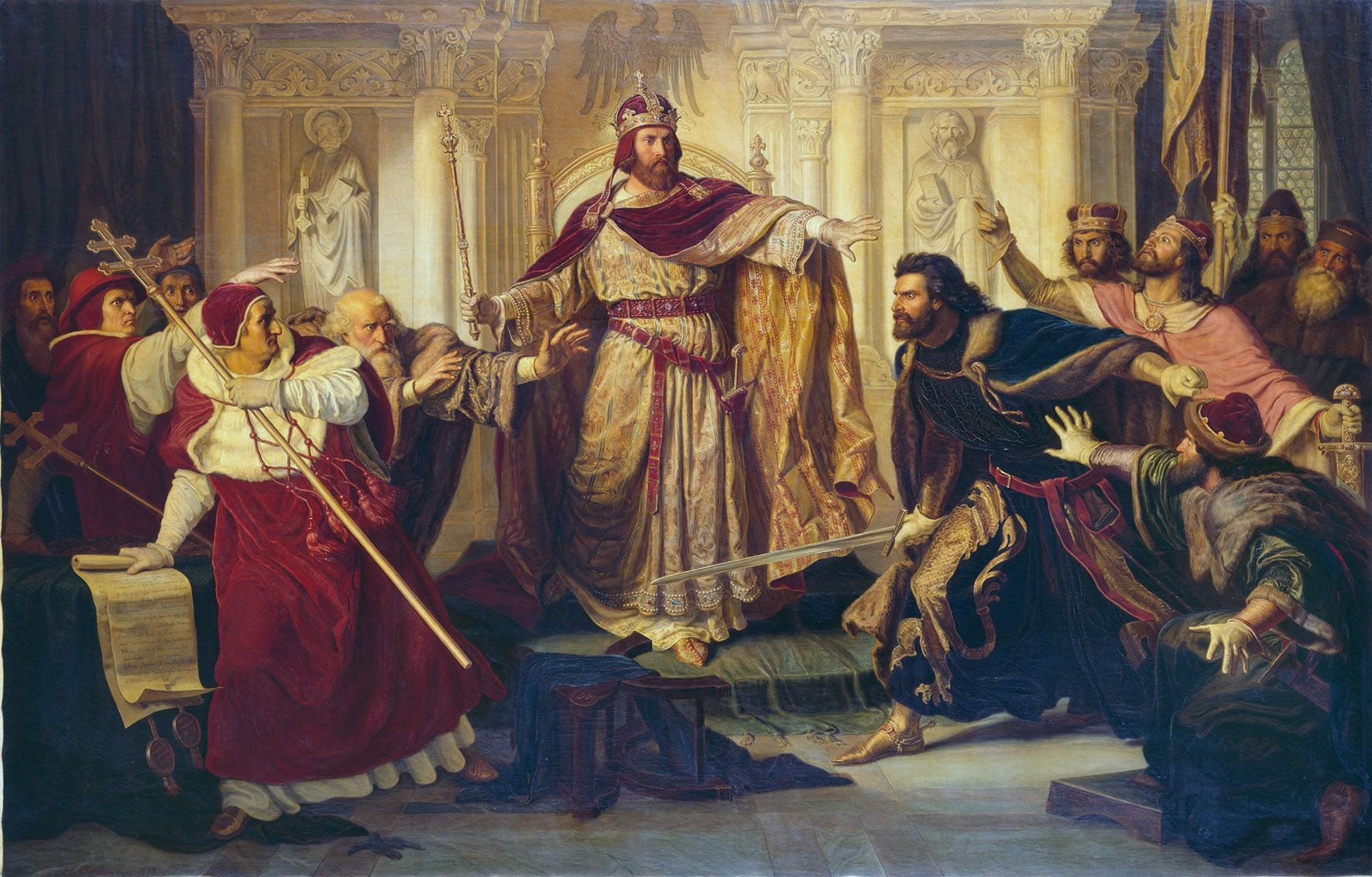
Frederick Barbarossa at the Imperial Diet in Besançon.

- Album deutscher Künstler in Originalradirungen. - Düsseldorf : Buddeus, 1841. (Online)
- Deutsche Dichtungen mit Randzeichnungen deutscher Künstler. - Düsseldorf : Buddeus, (Vols.1–2) 1843. (Online)
- Reumont, Alfred von. Sagas légendes des bords du Rhin : orné de 8 gravures sur acier. - Aix-la-Chapelle: Kohnen, 1838. (Online)
- Kugler, Franz. Skizzenbuch. - Berlin : Reimer, 1830. (Online)

== Sources ==
- Franz Schnorr von Carolsfeld (1888). "Plüddemann, Hermann" . Allgemeine Deutsche Biographie (in German). Vol. 26. Leipzig: Duncker & Humblot. pp. 323–324.
- Arthur Schulz: "Hermann Freihold Plüddemann (1809–1868)". In: Martin Wehrmann, Adolf Hofmeister, Wilhelm Braun (Eds.): Pommersche Lebensbilder, Vol.2: Pommern des 19. und 20. Jahrhunderts, Stettin 1936, pp. 85–92
- Ekkehard Mai: Hermann Freihold Plüddemann. Maler und Illustrator zwischen Spätromantik und Historismus (1809–1868). Ein Werkverzeichnis, Böhlau, Köln 2004, ISBN 3-412-06204-9
- "Plüddemann, Hermann" In: Meyers Konversations-Lexikon 1885–1892, Vol.13, pg.138
- Odila Schütz: "Herrmann Freihold Plüddemann 1809–1868", In: Sächsische Heimatblätter, Jahrgang 1999, Vol.1, pp. 34–40
