= The Almighty Dollar (1923 film) =

1923 film

- Directed by: Jaap Speyer
- Written by: Anneliese Hofer (novel)
- Cinematography: Heinrich Gärtner
- Music by: Oswald Stiller
- Production company: Magnus-Film
- Release date: 22 June 1923
- Country: Germany
- Languages: Silent; German intertitles

The Almighty Dollar (German: Der allmächtige Dollar) is a 1923 German silent film directed by Jaap Speyer. The film's sets were designed by the art director Siegfried Wroblewsky.

== Cast ==
In alphabetical order

- Lena Amsel
- Hugo Döblin
- Olga Engl
- Fred Immler
- Charles Willy Kayser
- Margarete Kupfer
- Friedrich Kühne
- Mia Pankau
- Albert Paulig
- Emil Rameau
- Paul Rehkopf
- Eduard von Winterstein

== Bibliography ==
- Parish, James Robert; Canham, Kingsley (1976). Film Directors Guide: Western Europe. Metuchen, NJ: Scarecrow Press. ISBN 978-0-8108-0908-6.
