= The Morals of the Alley =

1925 film

- Directed by: Jaap Speyer
- Written by: Jane Bess; Adolf Lantz
- Starring: Werner Krauss; Ernst Hofmann; Mary Odette
- Cinematography: Nicolas Farkas
- Production company: Export Film
- Release date: 30 October 1925
- Country: Germany
- Languages: Silent; German intertitles

The Morals of the Alley (German: Die Moral der Gasse) is a 1925 German silent film directed by Jaap Speyer and starring Werner Krauss, Ernst Hofmann, and Mary Odette.

The film's sets were designed by the art director Franz Schroedter.

== Cast ==
- Werner Krauss as Viehhändler Engros
- Ernst Hofmann as Engros Sohn
- Mary Odette as Mädchen aus der Gasse
- Evi Eva as Schustermeisters Tochter
- Johannes Riemann as Herr über Jazzband und Sekt
- Adolphe Engers as Der ausgelernte Lebemann
- Margarete Kupfer as Emilie
- Mia Pankau as Herrs Frau
- Hermann Picha as Der alte ehrliche Schustermeister
- Hugo Fischer-Köppe as Hans
- Rosa Valetti
- Ellen Plessow as Die giftige Zunge
- Hedy Searle

== Bibliography ==
- Bock, Hans-Michael; Bergfelder, Tim, eds. (2009). The Concise Cinegraph: Encyclopaedia of German Cinema. New York: Berghahn Books. ISBN 978-1-57181-655-9.
- Grange, William (2008). Cultural Chronicle of the Weimar Republic. Lanham, MD: Scarecrow Press. ISBN 978-0-8108-5967-8.
