= Oscar Schlitter =

German banker

- Born: 10 January 1868; Lennep, Rhine Province, Prussia
- Died: 30 November 1939 (aged 71); Berlin, Germany
- Occupation: Banker
- Spouse: Anna Bandhauer
- Children: Oskar Hermann Artur Schlitter

"Schlitter – das ist ein Mann der keine Feinde hat"
"Schlitter – that is a man without enemies"

tribute by the Deutsche Bank

Oscar Schlitter (10 January 1868 – 30 November 1939) was a German banker. Reflecting the long-standing "hands-on" approach of banks in Germany, Schlitter was involved in several major commercial and industrial mergers. He played a leading role in the 1929 merger of the indebted German VGF company with the Dutch ENKA business, creating one of the leading European producers of rayon.

== Biography ==
=== Early years ===
Schlitter's father, Albert, served as a soldier as a young man and later worked in a post office at Lennep, at that time a separate town, but subsequently subsumed into Remscheid. Oscar was born in Lennap in 1868. The family relocated to Düsseldorf in 1869. Düsseldorf was becoming a centre for the rapidly expanding railway network, and Albert took work as a train conductor. Schlitter grew up in Dusseldorf, attended school and then undertook commercial training.

=== Banking ===
After a banking apprenticeship with the Bergisch-Märkische Bank in Elberfeld, he switched in 1894 to the Credit-Anstalt Bank in Essen, where he drove an expansion of the bank's activities into large-scale industrial investment. He was appointed to the Executive Board of Directors in 1901.

In 1906, at the instigation of Carl Klönne, he took a directorship with Deutsche Bank. Just two years later he moved on again, becoming in 1908 the General Director of the Bergisch-Märkische Bank. The move took place in the context of an existing close relationship between the two banks, though it was not until 1914 that Deutsche Bank formally took over the Bergisch-Märkische Bank. In 1912 he returned to Deutsche Bank, now as a full member of the executive board, and was much involved in the fusion of the two banks which was, at the time, the largest such bank merger to date.

By 1912 Schlitter had acquired a strong reputation within the banking community for his knowledge of the burgeoning industrial sector. His career mirrored the developments of his time. He was involved in the building and financing of the heavy industry sector in the Rhineland and Westphalia, as well as in the mechanical and electrical engineering sectors becoming focused on the Ruhr region in particular, and the surrounding area more generally. Later, in the 1930s, he was deeply immersed in the consolidation of the insurance sector following the collapse of the Weimar democracy.

He became a member of the supervisory board (Aufsichtsrat) of Algemene Kunstzijde Unie (AKU), the holding company created in 1929 as part of the merger of the German VGF company with the Dutch ENKA business. He also became a supervisory board member for various other major corporations including IG Farben (1931–1935), the industrial conglomerates Deutsch-Luxemburgische Bergwerks- und Hütten-AG and Phoenix AG für Bergbau und Hüttenbetrieb, the Gelsenkirchener Bergwerks-AG mining company, the power company RWE and Mannesmann. He was involved in the founding of Vereinigte Stahlwerke AG.

Massive mergers within the German industrial sector were consciously mirrored in the banking sector. Schlitter was closely engaged in the 1929 mega-merger of Deutsche Bank with its rival, the Disconto-Gesellschaft bank organisation, remaining for three years on the executive board of the combined entity. In 1932 he switched to the supervisory board, chairing it every other year between 1933 and 1939, alternating with Franz Urbig, the former boss of Disconto-Gesellschaft.

== Family ==
Schlitter's paternal ancestors came from Schlitters in the west of the Tyrol, but the family successfully relocated further north as protestant refugees.

In 1904 Oscar Schlitter married Anna Bandhauer, the daughter of Otto Bandhauer, Director of the Essen-based West German Insurance and Investment Bank ("Westdeutsche Versicherungs-Aktienbank"). Their son was Oskar Hermann Artur Schlitter who in 1932 married the film actress and former Miss Germany, Daisy D'ora, joined the Nazi Party in 1934 and spent the twelve Nazi years working in a succession of important diplomatic and government posts; after 1952 Oskar (junior) resumed a diplomatic career.

=== Family home ===
Oscar Schlitter lived in the Berlin quarter of Schwanenwerder, which on German language Monopoly boards before 1933 occupied the square that English players of the game associated with Mayfair. It was an expensive area and many of his neighbours were, like him, bankers, some of whom the Nazi Party identified as Jewish. By the end of the 1930s houses in the locality were the homes not of Jewish bankers but of party members. Schlitter sold his own home, and the substantial plot that it occupied at 8–10 Island Street (Inselstraße 8–10) in the summer of 1935, to Joseph Goebbels for a price of 270,000 Reichsmarks, described later by one authority as "a very modest sum".

== Beyond banking ==
Schlitter was a member of the Mittwochsgesellschaft (Wednesday Society) between 1932 and 1939.
