= Hedda's Revenge =

1919 film

- Directed by: Jaap Speyer
- Production company: Progreß-Film
- Release date: 26 July 1919
- Country: Germany
- Languages: Silent; German intertitles

Hedda's Revenge (German: Heddas Rache) is a 1919 German silent film directed by Jaap Speyer.

== Cast ==
In alphabetical order

- Karl Beckersachs as Bernd Olden, Ingenieur
- Arnold Czempin
- Bruno Eichgrün as Henry Milner, Bankier
- Gertrude Hoffman
- Mia Pankau as Hedda
- Emil Rameau as Ludwig Gerlach, Kaufmann
- Kaethe Richter as Martha
- Reinhold Schünzel as Georg
- Grete Weixler as Kitty

== Bibliography ==
- Parish, James Robert; Canham, Kingsley (1976). Film Directors Guide: Western Europe. Metuchen, NJ: Scarecrow Press. ISBN 978-0-8108-0908-6.
