= Hotel Rats =

1927 film

- Directed by: Jaap Speyer
- Written by: Johannes Brandt
- Starring: Nils Asther; Ellen Kürti; Mia Pankau
- Cinematography: Hans Karl Gottschalk
- Music by: Hans May
- Production company: Ewe Film
- Distributed by: Süd-Film
- Release date: 14 April 1927
- Country: Germany
- Languages: Silent; German intertitles

Hotel Rats (German: Hotelratten) is a 1927 German silent film directed by Jaap Speyer and starring Nils Asther, Ellen Kürti, and Mia Pankau.

== Cast ==
- Nils Asther as Fürst Ladrone
- Ellen Kürti as Fürstin Ladrone
- Mia Pankau as Lilian Bellmann
- Gyula Szőreghy as Ober
- Hans Mierendorff as Mister Bellmann
- Carl Fenz as Professor Behlings
- Alfred Gerasch as Jenkins
- Hélène Hallier as Ethel Bellmann

== Bibliography ==
- Grange, William (2008). Cultural Chronicle of the Weimar Republic. Lanham, MD: Scarecrow Press. ISBN 978-0-8108-5967-8.
