= Last Testament =

Last Testament may refer to:

- Quran
- Will and testament
- Church of the Last Testament
- The Last Testament
