= The Red Night =

1921 film

- Directed by: Jaap Speyer
- Written by: Helmuth Orthmann
- Cinematography: Heinrich Gärtner
- Production company: Vera-Filmwerke
- Release date: 22 October 1921
- Country: Germany
- Languages: Silent; German intertitles

The Red Night (German: Die rote Nacht) is a 1921 German silent film directed by Jaap Speyer.

== Cast ==
- Mia Pankau as Daytons Tochter
- Hermann Wlach as Tom Hood, Detektiv
- Oskar Marion Fred Harding, Maler
- Max Wogritsch as Robert Cowper
- Ludwig Max as Viscount Dayton
- Julius Kobler as Mörder
- Gerhard Ritterband as Zeitungsjunge
- Fred Markussen
- Margarete Otto-Körner
- Arthur Schröder
- Erich Ziegel

== Bibliography ==
- Parish, James Robert; Canham, Kingsley (1976). Film Directors Guide: Western Europe. Metuchen, NJ: Scarecrow Press. ISBN 978-0-8108-0908-6.
