= The Doll of Luna Park =

1925 film

- Directed by: Jaap Speyer
- Written by: Hans Behrendt
- Starring: Alice Hechy; Walter Rilla; Fritz Rasp
- Cinematography: Paul Holzki; Karl Koennecke
- Production company: Westi Film
- Distributed by: Westi Film
- Release date: 7 July 1925
- Country: Germany
- Languages: Silent; German intertitles

The Doll of Luna Park (German: Die Puppe vom Lunapark) is a 1925 German silent drama film directed by Jaap Speyer and starring Alice Hechy, Walter Rilla, and Fritz Rasp.

The film's sets were designed by Franz Schroedter.

== Cast ==
- Alice Hechy
- Walter Rilla
- Fritz Rasp
- Anna von Palen
- Peter Berneis
- Hermann Vallentin
- Eugen Rex
- Adolphe Engers
- Jenny Jugo

== Bibliography ==
- Grange, William (2008). Cultural Chronicle of the Weimar Republic. Lanham, MD: Scarecrow Press. ISBN 978-0-8108-5967-8.
