= The Elegant Bunch =

1925 film

- Directed by: Jaap Speyer
- Written by: Heinz Goldberg; Adolf Lantz
- Starring: Eugen Klöpfer; Mary Odette; Ralph Arthur Roberts
- Cinematography: Otto Kanturek
- Production company: Domo-Film
- Distributed by: Westfalia-Film
- Release date: 28 August 1925
- Country: Germany
- Languages: Silent; German intertitles

The Elegant Bunch (German: Elegantes Pack) is a 1925 German silent film directed by Jaap Speyer and starring Eugen Klöpfer, Mary Odette, and Ralph Arthur Roberts.

The film's sets were designed by the art director Franz Schroedter.

== Cast ==
- Eugen Klöpfer as Anton Paudler
- Mary Odette as Hilde
- Ralph Arthur Roberts as Harry Brückner
- Hanni Weisse as Erika
- Johannes Riemann as Dr. Leo Bärenreither
- Ilka Grüning as Leos Mutter
- Paul Morgan as Erwin Griebel
- Margarete Kupfer as Alma Kupfer
- Mia Pankau as Else
- Frida Richard as Tante Ida
- Louis Ralph as Antons Freund
- Hans Brausewetter as Paul Markert
- Adolphe Engers as Barbesitzer
- Hermann Picha as Portier
- Max Grünberg as Kriminalbeamter
- Ellen Lange
- Lissy Arna as Erna Kallweit

== Bibliography ==
- Grange, William (2008). Cultural Chronicle of the Weimar Republic. Lanham, MD: Scarecrow Press. ISBN 978-0-8108-5967-8.
