= Jimmy: The Tale of a Girl and Her Bear =

1923 film

- Directed by: Jaap Speyer
- Written by: Helmuth Orthmann
- Starring: Mia Pankau; Ernst Hofmann; Margarete Lanner
- Cinematography: Hans Kämpfe; Max Lutze
- Music by: Hansheinrich Dransmann
- Production company: Vera-Filmwerke
- Release date: 15 June 1923
- Country: Germany
- Languages: Silent; German intertitles

Jimmy: The Tale of a Girl and Her Bear (German: Jimmy, ein Schicksal von Mensch und Tier) is a 1923 German silent film directed by Jaap Speyer and starring Mia Pankau, Ernst Hofmann, and Margarete Lanner.

== Cast ==
- Mia Pankau as Artistin Maud
- Ernst Hofmann as Herzog Percy von Glauburne
- Margarete Lanner as Percys Freundin Ethel
- Hermann Wlach as Lord O'Cornell
- Fred Markussen as Kapitän Bryde
- Julius Kobler as Bärenwärter Rove
- Maria Forescu
- Konrad Gebhard
- Max Laurence
- Hans Hermann Schaufuß

== Bibliography ==
- Grange, William (2008). Cultural Chronicle of the Weimar Republic. Lanham, MD: Scarecrow Press. ISBN 978-0-8108-5967-8.
