= Colombine (film) =

1920 film

- Directed by: Martin Hartwig
- Written by: Emil Rameau; Jaap Speyer
- Starring: Emil Jannings; Margarete Lanner; Alex Otto
- Cinematography: Hans Kämpfe
- Production company: Vera-Filmwerke
- Distributed by: Martin Dentler
- Release date: 7 December 1920
- Country: Germany
- Languages: Silent; German intertitles

Colombine is a 1920 German silent film directed by Martin Hartwig and starring Emil Jannings, Margarete Lanner and Alex Otto.

== Cast ==
- Emil Jannings as Carlo
- Margarete Lanner
- Alex Otto
- Gustav Adolf Semler
- Erich Ziegel

== Bibliography ==
- Monaco, James. The Encyclopedia of Film. Perigee Books, 1991.
