= EHE =

EHE, EHe or Ehe may refer to:

- Epithelioid hemangioendothelioma (abbreviated EHE), a type of tumor
- Extreme helium star (abbreviated EHe), a type of star
- Elective home education (abbreviated EHE), a form of education
- Marriage (1929 film) (German: Die Ehe, abbreviated Ehe), a 1929 German silent film
