= Sator =

Sator may refer to:

- Šator, a mountain in Bosnia and Herzegovina
- Sator (band), a Swedish band
- Sator (film), a 2020 American supernatural horror film
- Sator (lizard), a genus of lizard
- Sator bean (Parkia speciosa), or stink bean, a bean with a strong smell popular in South East Asian cuisine
- Sator Square (or Rotas Square), a first-century word square containing a five-word Latin palindrome
- Sator (the "Sower"), a minor Roman agricultural deity or cult title
- Andrei Sator, a character from the film Tenet

== People with the surname ==
- Klaus Sator (born 1956), German historian
- László Sátor (born 1953), Hungarian racewalker
- Senihad Šator (born 1996), German politician
- Ted Sator (born 1949), American ice hockey coach
