= Schede =

Schede may refer to:

- Schede (river), of Lower Saxony, Germany

== People with that surname ==
- Max Schede (1844–1902), German surgeon
- Paulus Melissus (1539–1602), also Paul Schede, humanist Neo-Latin writer, translator and composer
- Wolfgang Martin Schede (1898–1975), German writer, choreographer and photographer
