= Diet of Besançon =

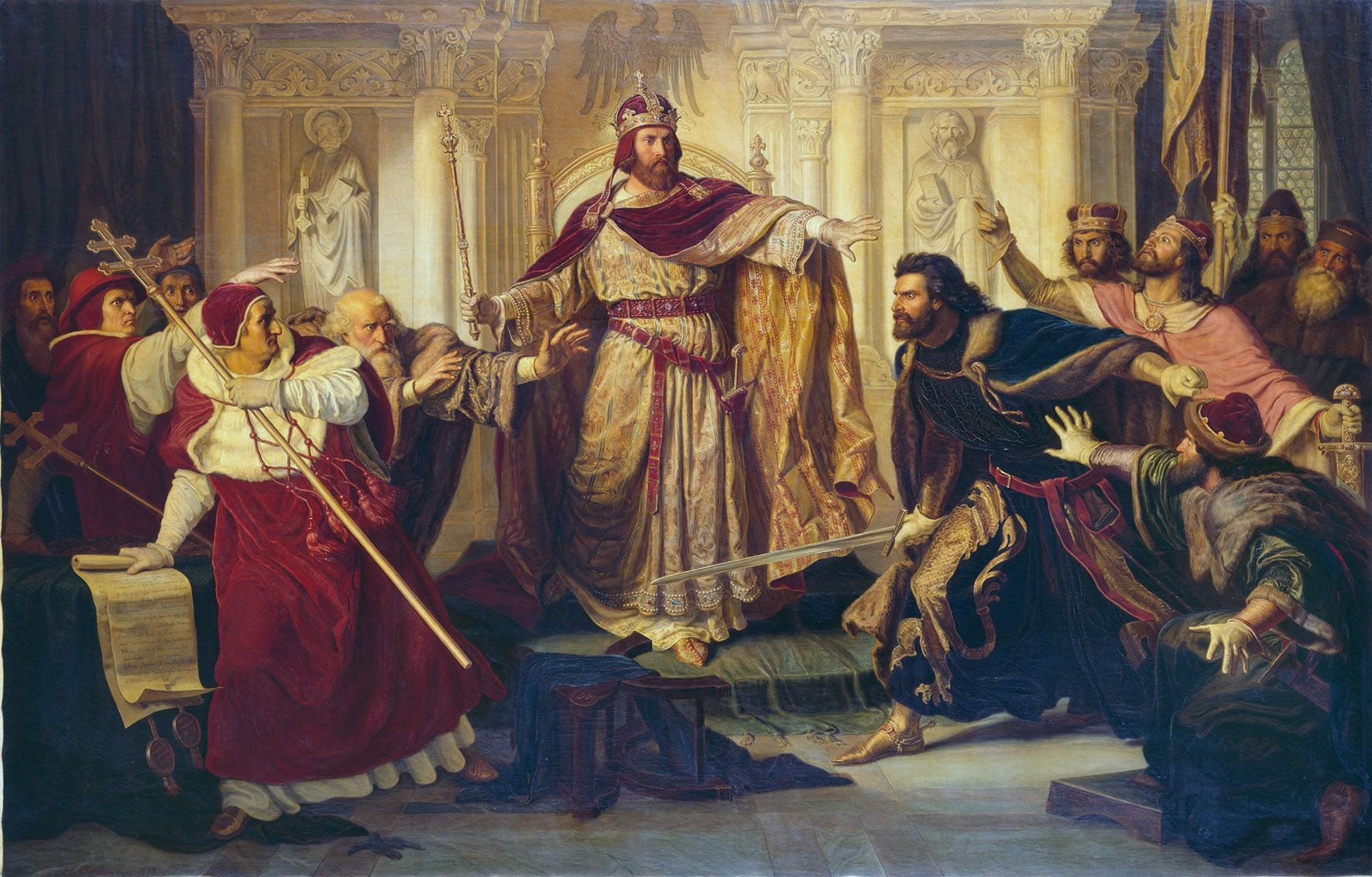
Frederick stops Duke Otto from striking Cardinal Roland. A romantic painting by Hermann Plüddemann (1859).

The Diet of Besançon was a Hoftag (diet) of the Holy Roman Empire held in the city of Besançon by the Emperor Frederick Barbarossa in October 1157.

The contemporary historian Rahewin provides important coverage of the diet. Two charters issued by Frederick during the diet are known, dated 24 and 27 October. The diet must have begun at least a few days before this.

The purpose of the diet was to order "the affairs of the empire" in the Kingdom of Arles. According to Rahewin, Frederick was so successful in bringing peace to that kingdom that he could have travelled its entire length almost unescorted. Although limited in its official purpose, the diet attracted persons from throughout the Empire and also foreign dignitaries. Rahewin lists Romans, Apulians, Tuscans, Venetians, Frenchmen, Englishmen and Spaniards. Extoling Frederic, Rahewin states that "the whole world recognized him as the most powerful and most merciful ruler".

The most significant event at Besançon, however, was not on Frederick's agenda. Pope Adrian IV was represented by two cardinals, Roland of San Marco and Bernard of San Clemente, who publicly read out a papal letter declaring Frederick to be a vassal of the Holy See. The letter so offended Duke Otto I of Bavaria that he threatened Roland with his sword until Frederick reminded him that the cardinals had a safe conduct. Frederick responded to the letter with a strong protest to the pope.

Frederick remained in Besançon until 25 November.

== Bibliography ==
- Freed, John (2016). Frederick Barbarossa: The Prince and the Myth. Yale University Press.
