= Letters Which Never Reached Him =

1925 film

- German: Briefe, die ihn nicht erreichten
- Directed by: Frederic Zelnik
- Written by: Elisabeth von Heyking (novel); Paul Merzbach; Siegfried Philippi
- Produced by: Frederic Zelnik
- Starring: Albert Bassermann; Marcella Albani; Mia Pankau
- Cinematography: Frederik Fuglsang
- Production company: Friedrich Zelnick-Film
- Distributed by: Süd-Film
- Release date: 9 October 1925
- Country: Germany
- Languages: Silent; German intertitles

Letters Which Never Reached Him (German: Briefe, die ihn nicht erreichten) is a 1925 German silent film directed by Frederic Zelnik and starring Albert Bassermann, Marcella Albani and Mia Pankau.

The film's sets were designed by the art directors André Andrejew and Gustav A. Knauer.

== Cast ==
- Albert Bassermann as Consul Werner Gerling
- Marcella Albani as Elena
- Mia Pankau as Bessie, her friend
- Oreste Bilancia as William Charles O'Doyle, her husband
- Nils Asther as Georg von Arnim
- Bernhard Goetzke as Chü-Hi-Yin
- Tzwetta Tzatschewa as Tsu-Hsi, his daughter
- Alf Blütecher as Sir Anstrutter
- Mira Brandt as Vivian
- Wilhelm Diegelmann as Lord Dayton
- Edith Sklarz as his daughter
- Nien Soen Ling as Ta-Kwan-Li, a Kuli
