= Hermann Wlach =

Austrian actor

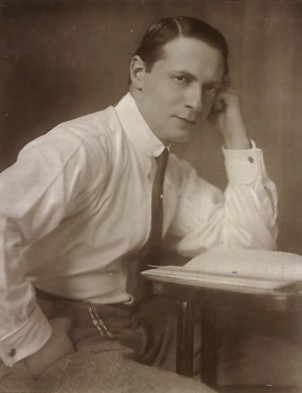
- Born: Armin Wlach; 11 August 1884; Vienna, Austria-Hungary
- Died: 28 January 1962 (aged 77); Zollikon, Switzerland
- Occupation(s): Actor, Stage
- Years active: 1920-1957

Hermann Wlach (11 August 1884 – 28 January 1962) was an Austrian stage and film actor.

Born Armin Wlach in Vienna, he died in 1962 at age 77 in Zollikon, Switzerland.

== Filmography ==
Year	Title	Role	Notes
1915	Sein schwierigster Fall	Ralph Bourgh	
1916	The Sin of Helga Arndt		
1916	Aussage verweigert	Verdächtiger	
1916	Der Fall Hoop	Phil Obrynd	
1916	Seine letzte Maske		
1920	Whitechapel	Jac	
1920	Manolescus Memoiren	Rudolf Berg, Oberkellner	
1921	Queen of the Streets	Maler	
1921	The Pearl Maker of Madrid		
1921	Banditen im Frack		
1921	Die rote Nacht	Tom Hood, Detektiv	
1922	Strandgut der Leidenschaft		
1922	Das Geheimnis der grünen Villa		
1922	Jimmy: The Tale of a Girl and Her Bear	Lord O'Cornell	
1922	Das blonde Verhängnis		
1927	Mata Hari		
1931	1914	Count von Jagow	
1931	The Captain from Köpenick	Entlassungsbeamter	
1957	Der 10. Mai	Julius Herz	

== Bibliography ==
- Evans, T.F. George Bernard Shaw: The Critical Heritage. Routledge, 1997.
