= Eberhard Frowein =

German screenwriter and film director

- Born: 24 May 1881; Elberfeld, German Empire
- Died: 15 January 1964 (aged 82); Altaussee, Austria
- Occupations: Film director Screenwriter
- Years active: 1921–1954

Eberhard Frowein (1881–1964) was a German screenwriter and film director. He was also a director of the Comedia-Film production company. As a screenwriter he is noted for his work on the controversial 1941 Nazi film I Accuse. He later retired to Austria.

== Selected filmography ==
=== Director ===
- The Pearl Maker of Madrid (1921)
- Marriage (1929)
- Fertility (1929)

=== Screenwriter ===
- The Wig (1925)
- The Flower Girl from the Grand Hotel (1934)
- Demon of the Himalayas (1935)
- By a Silken Thread (1938)
- Target in the Clouds (1939)
- I Accuse (1941)

== Bibliography ==
- Hailey, Christopher. Franz Schreker: 1878-1934: A Cultural Biography. CUP Archive, 1993.
- Welch, David. Propaganda and the German Cinema, 1933-1945. I.B.Tauris, 2001.
