= White Slave Traffic =

1926 film

- Directed by: Jaap Speyer
- Written by: Lothar Knud Frederik; Paul Rosenhayn; E. Sulke
- Starring: Rudolf Klein-Rogge; Erich Kaiser-Titz; Fritz Alberti
- Cinematography: Paul Holzki
- Music by: Hans May
- Production company: Liberty-Film
- Distributed by: Süd-Film
- Release date: 1926
- Country: Germany
- Languages: Silent; German intertitles

White Slave Traffic (German: Mädchenhandel – Eine internationale Gefahr, lit. 'Trafficking in girls – an international threat') is a 1926 German silent thriller film directed by Jaap Speyer and starring Rudolf Klein-Rogge, Erich Kaiser-Titz, and Fritz Alberti. When a Berlin nightclub worker moves to Budapest to take up a job that has been arranged for her, she finds herself being kidnapped by white slave traffickers. She is eventually rescued from a brothel in Athens. The film opened with a warning from a group committed to combating white slavery, but the film's sensationalist tone provoked controversy. In Britain it was refused a licence by the British Board of Film Censors although it is possible it had some private screenings. One contemporary review described it as a "crude melodrama on an unpleasant subject".

== Cast ==
- Rudolf Klein-Rogge as Simpat Karamanian, Arut Akkunian, ein deutscher Professor, ein asiatischer Hausierer und Dr. Papamarkos
- Erich Kaiser-Titz as Polizeihauptmann von Budapest
- Fritz Alberti as Justizminister
- Charles Lincoln as Geza Farkacz
- Wera Engels as Irene Wendtland
- Frau Szlikay as Frau Generalin von Dingolstaedt
- Trude Hesterberg as Meta Pohlmann
- Mary Kid as Ida Schulz
- Wilhelm Diegelmann as Vater Schulz
- Sophie Pagay as Mutter Schulz
- Paul Rehkopf as Sylviani
- Mira Hildebrand as Margarete
- Kurt Gerron as Direktor des Purpur-Paradieses
- Maria Forescu as Eine menschenfreundliche Frau
- Mia Pankau as Aranka von Erdödyi

== Bibliography ==
- Robertson, James Crighton (1993). The Hidden Cinema: British Film Censorship in Action, 1913–1975. London: Routledge. ISBN 978-0-415-09034-6.
