= Queen of the Streets =

1921 film

- Directed by: Ernst Mölter
- Written by: Fred Feldern; Ernst Mölter
- Produced by: Traute Trauneck
- Cinematography: Curt Courant
- Distributed by: Trauneck-Film
- Release date: 4 February 1921
- Country: Germany
- Languages: Silent; German intertitles

Queen of the Streets (German:Die Gassenkönigin) is a 1921 German silent film directed by Ernst Mölter.

== Cast ==
- Traute Trauneck
- Else Andresen
- Arthur Beder
- Gertrude De Lalsky
- Ernst Hallenstein
- Kurt Hardegg
- Katherina Kock
- Erich Moller
- Hermann Wlach as Maler

== Bibliography ==
- Hans-Michael Bock and Tim Bergfelder. The Concise Cinegraph: An Encyclopedia of German Cinema. Berghahn Books.
