= The Man with the Fake Banknote =

1927 film

- Directed by: Romano Mengon
- Written by: Romano Mengon
- Starring: Nils Asther; Vivian Gibson; Margarete Lanner
- Cinematography: Paul Rischke
- Production company: Continental-Film
- Distributed by: Continental-Film
- Release date: 1 February 1927
- Country: Germany
- Languages: Silent; German intertitles

The Man with the Fake Banknote or The Man with the Counterfeit Money (German: Der Mann mit der falschen Banknote) is a 1927 German silent crime film directed by Romano Mengon and starring Nils Asther, Vivian Gibson and Margarete Lanner.

The film's art direction was by Robert A. Dietrich.

== Cast ==
- Nils Asther
- Vivian Gibson
- Margarete Lanner
- Sig Arno
- Philipp Manning
- Karl Platen

== Bibliography ==
- Hans-Michael Bock and Tim Bergfelder. The Concise Cinegraph: An Encyclopedia of German Cinema. Berghahn Books.
- Grange, William. Cultural Chronicle of the Weimar Republic. Scarecrow Press, 2008.
