= Mia Pankau =

German actress

- Born: 14 February 1891; Friedland in Oberschlesien, Upper Silesia, German Empire
- Died: 6 November 1974 (aged 83); Hoisdorf, Schleswig-Holstein, West Germany
- Other name: Martha Elisabeth Pankau
- Occupation: Actress
- Years active: 1917–1931 (film)

Mia Pankau (1891–1974) was a German film actress. She was married to the director Jaap Speyer, who directed her in a number of films during the silent era.

== Selected filmography ==
- Hedda's Revenge (1919)
- Lilli (1919)
- Lilli's Marriage (1919)
- The Red Night (1921)
- The Marriage Swindler (1922)
- King of Women (1923)
- Jimmy: The Tale of a Girl and Her Bear (1923)
- The Almighty Dollar (1923)
- The Elegant Bunch (1925)
- Letters Which Never Reached Him (1925)
- The Morals of the Alley (1925)
- White Slave Traffic (1926)
- Hotel Rats (1927)
- The Three Women of Urban Hell (1928)
- The First Kiss (1928)
- The Last Testament (1929)

== Bibliography ==
- Grange, William. Cultural Chronicle of the Weimar Republic. Scarecrow Press, 2008.
