= Karl Alwin =

German orchestra conductor

External audio
- Shellac recordings with Karl Alwin the Online Archive of the Österreichische Mediathek

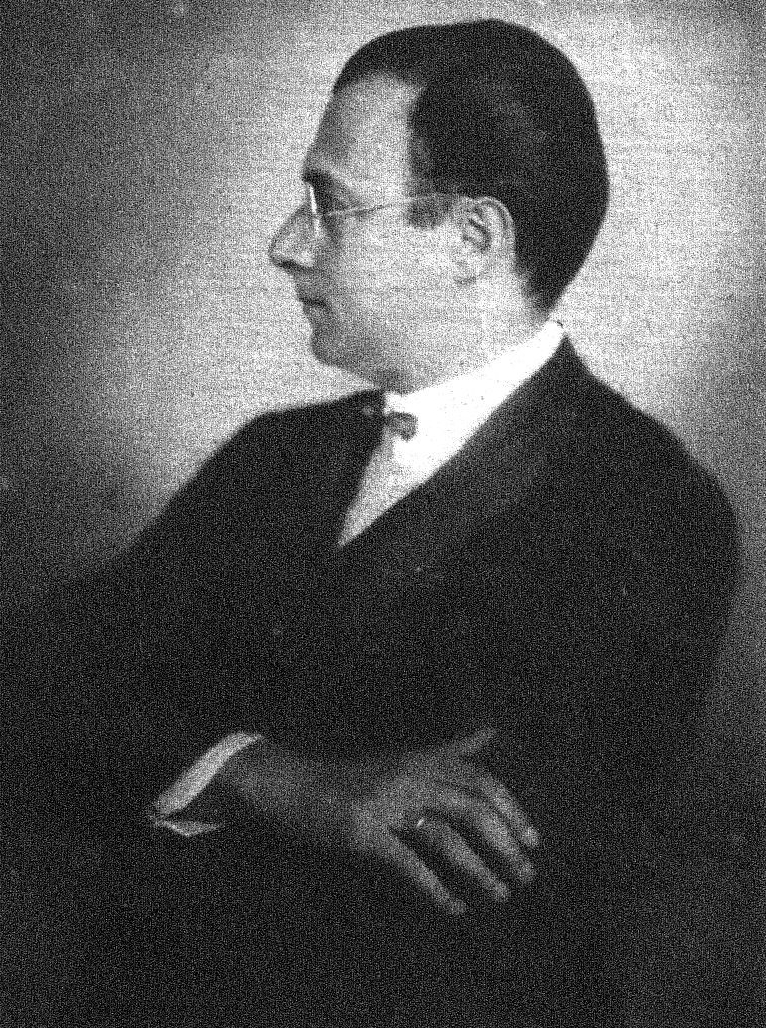
Karl Alwin, around 1925 (photo by Franz Xaver Setzer)

Karl Alwin often Carl Alwin (formerly known as Alwin Oskar Pinkus; 15 April 1891 – 15 October 1945) was a German orchestra conductor.

== Biography ==
Alwin was born in Königsberg. He studied philosophy, literature and music in Berlin alongside his friends Engelbert Humperdinck and Hugo Kaun. After his education, he worked from 1910 at the Berlin Court Opera and from 1912 in Bayreuth as an assistant. He then started his career as a conductor in 1913 in Halle (Saale), 1914 in Poznań, 1915–1917 in Düsseldorf and then until 1920 in Hamburg. From 1920 to 1938 he conducted at the Vienna State Opera until after the takeover by the Nazis due to a professional disqualification became unoccupied. Because of his Jewish origin, Alwin had to emigrate to the United States. He worked for the Chicago Civic Opera but after the season of 1939/40, he moved to Mexico and conducted in Mexico City at the Opera Nacional from 1941 until his death there in 1945. He also taught at the State Conservatory.

From 1920 to 1933 he was married to the soprano Elisabeth Schumann.
