= Jaap Speyer =

Dutch film director

- Born: 29 November 1891; Amsterdam, Netherlands
- Died: 17 September 1952 (aged 60); Amsterdam, Netherlands
- Occupation: Film director
- Years active: 1917–1949

Jaap Speyer (1891–1952) was a Dutch film director. He was married to the German actress Mia Pankau.

== Selected filmography ==
- Hedda's Revenge (1919)
- Entblätterte Blüten (1920)
- Colombine (1920)
- Die rote Nacht (1921)
- King of Women (1923)
- Jimmy: The Tale of a Girl and Her Bear (1923)
- Der allmächtige Dollar (1923)
- The Flower Girl of Potsdam Square (1925)
- The Doll of Luna Park (1925)
- The Elegant Bunch (1925)
- The Morals of the Alley (1925)
- The Three Mannequins (1926)
- White Slave Traffic (1926)
- Valencia (1927)
- Bigamie (1927)
- Hotelratten (1927)
- Liebeshandel (1927)
- The Schorrsiegel Affair (1928)
- Miss Chauffeur (1928)
- Die drei Frauen von Urban Hell (1928)
- Tales from the Vienna Woods (1928)
- Ein kleiner Vorschuß auf die Seligkeit (1929)
- Jennys Bummel durch die Männer (1929)
- Retreat on the Rhine (1930)
- Tingel-Tangel (1930)
- Tänzerinnen für Süd-Amerika gesucht (1931)
- Moritz Makes his Fortune (1931)
- Kampf um Blond (1933)
- The Tars (1934)
- Malle Gevallen (1934)
- De Familie van mijn Vrouw (1935)
- Kermisgasten (1936)
- Op een Avond in Mei (1937)
- A Kingdom For a Horse (1949)

== Bibliography ==
- Robertson, James C. (1993). The Hidden Cinema: British Film Censorship in Action, 1913–1975. London: Routledge. ISBN 978-0-203-99007-0.
- Kreimeier, Klaus (1999). The Ufa Story: A History of Germany's Greatest Film Company, 1918–1945. Berkeley: University of California Press. ISBN 978-0-520-22069-0.
