= Lena Amsel =

German dancer and actor

Lisette Verea
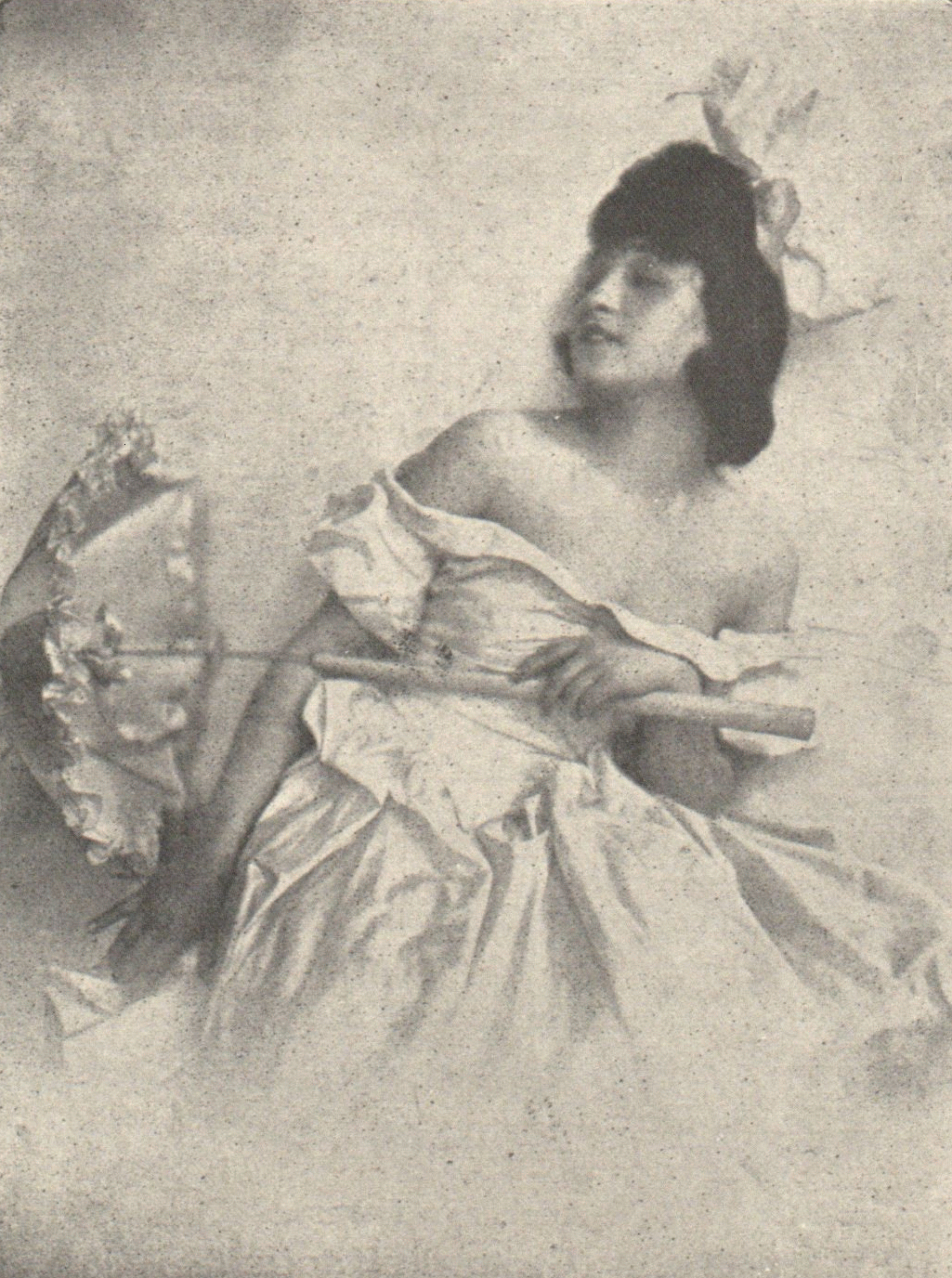
- Lena Amsel, photo taken by Franz Xaver Setzer (1918)
- Born: July 27, 1898; Łódź, Congress Poland, Russian Empire
- Died: November 2, 1929 (aged 31); Paris, French Third Republic
- Occupations: Dancer, actress

Lena Amsel (27 July 1898 in Łódź – 2 November 1929 in Paris) was a dancer and actress.

== Biography ==
She came from a Jewish manufacturer family. In 1914, she moved to Dresden, in 1915 to Berlin. At the beginning of her career, she sought contact with the greats of variety, film and theatre. In 1916, in the Café des Westerns in Berlin, she met Karl Gustav Vollmoeller and Max Reinhardt. Vollmoeller became her lover and sponsor for several years.

In 1917, she became a dancer on the stage in the conservatory (Varieté), shortly afterwards she began working in front of the camera in Vienna. In 1917/18, she played in several silent films. Most notably: Pinselputzi causes mischief and a marriage, Brush cleaning rendevouzelt, Lena's noble acquaintance, my daughter, your daughter and the road to wealth.

Although she had no dance education, Lena Amsel was kept for a few years on German and Austrian stages as a dancer. Her film career continued at the beginning of the 20s. In 1922/23, she appeared in the four episodes of The Tragedy of Love, directed by Joe May, she played alongside Emil Jannings, Mia May, Curt Goetz and Marlene Dietrich. Her last film was "The Mighty Dollar", 1923, with Eduard von Winterstein.

In her private life, the 1917-1924 ongoing affair with Vollmoeller was interrupted by three short marriages and three divorces. In 1927, Lena Amsel moved to Paris. Vollmoeller brought her into contact with well-known artists: André Derain, Georges Braque, Pablo Picasso, Ossip Zadkine, Louis Aragon, André Breton, René Crevel and Paul Éluard.

On 2 November 1929, she organized a car race with André Derain near Paris. Both drove Bugatti sports cars. Amsel's car slammed, overturned and caught fire. Lena Amsel and her friend Florence Pitron died in the accident.

== Filmography ==
- 1917: Pinselputzi causes mischief and a marriage
- 1918: Brush cleaning rendevouzelt
- 1918: Lena's noble acquaintance
- 1918: My daughter, your daughter
- 1918: The road to wealth
- 1918: Lene or Lena?
- 1923: Tragedy of love
- 1923: The Almighty Dollar
