= Joseph Fay (artist) =

German painter and illustrator (1812-1875)

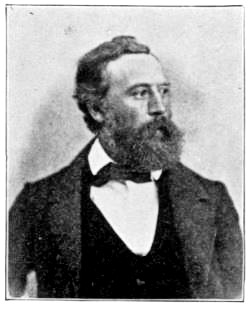
Joseph Fay (date unknown)

Joseph Fay (6 August 1812 – 27 July 1875) was a German painter and illustrator; associated with the Düsseldorfer Malerschule.

== Life and work ==
He was born in Cologne. From 1833 to 1844, he studied at the Academy of fine arts in Düsseldorf (de: Kunstakademie Düsseldorf); initially under the tutelage of Karl Ferdinand Sohn. He took an active interest in the Academy, including a directorship of the school until he passed. From 1841 to 1842, he attended master classes taught by Friedrich Wilhelm von Schadow.

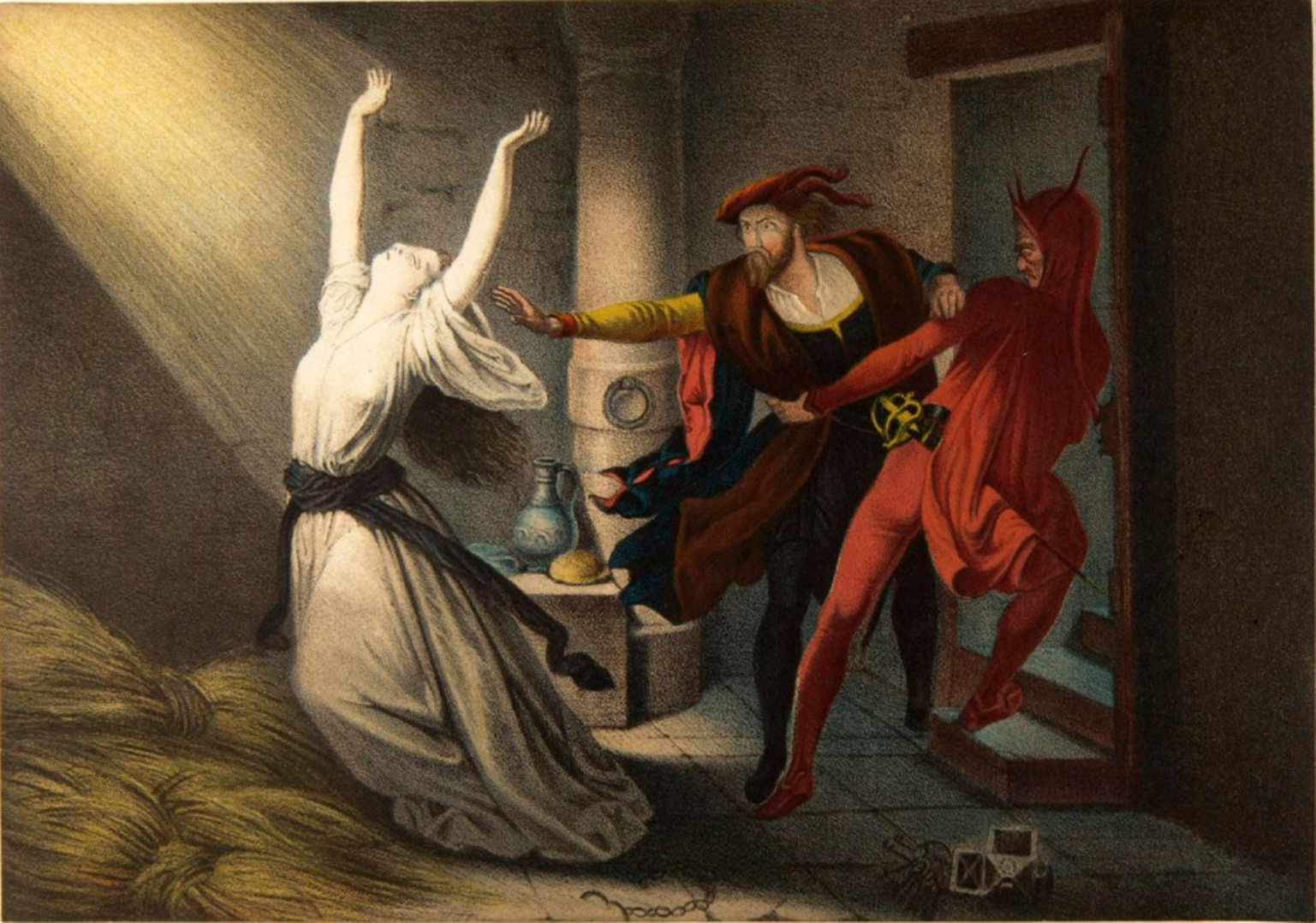
Faust and Mephisto in the Dungeon

In 1840, Fay made a successful debut at an exhibition with his painting of Samson and Delilah (de: Sampson trahi par Dalillah) followed by Cleopatra (fr: une mort d Cleopatre). In the same year, together with Lorenz Clasen, Heinrich Mücke and Hermann Plüddemann, he won a competition sponsored by the Kunstverein für die Rheinlande und Westfalen, to create a frescos depicting the early history of the Germans, up to the Battle of the Teutoburg Forest, at the Altes Elberfelder Rathaus. Fay's fresco, entitled Customs and Life of the Ancient Germans, executed in 1843, proved to be his artistic breakthrough and received enthusiastic reviews and brought him numerous successes. Poet, Wolfgang Müller von Königswinter placed Fay's fresco alongside the work of Rethel, stating that "among painters, there is only one who bears resemblance to Rethel [that of the work by Joseph Fay]". The frescos were destroyed during World War II.

He went to Paris in 1844, where he studied history painting alongside two acquaintances from Düsseldorf, and became a pupil of Paul Delaroche with a particular emphasis on the study of painting history. Following his return to Düsseldorf, he produced no major works.

In 1848, he became one of the co-founders of the progressive artists' association "Malkasten" (Paintbox). After the revolution of 1848, Fay, like many other Düsseldorf artists, withdrew from politically charged history painting and mainly focused on simple genre scenes and works inspired by literature, including a melodramatic last scene from Faust by Goethe, Mephisto in the Dungeon (de: Mephisto im Kerker) which he also lithographed, and Italian motifs such as the Bathing Roman Women (de: die Badenden Römerinnen). Many of his paintings featured Italian motifs, and he became a regular visitor to Italy. The background landscapes in his works were often painted by August Weber. He occasionally worked as an interior designer, and took a few private students; notably Karl Ferdinand Wimar.

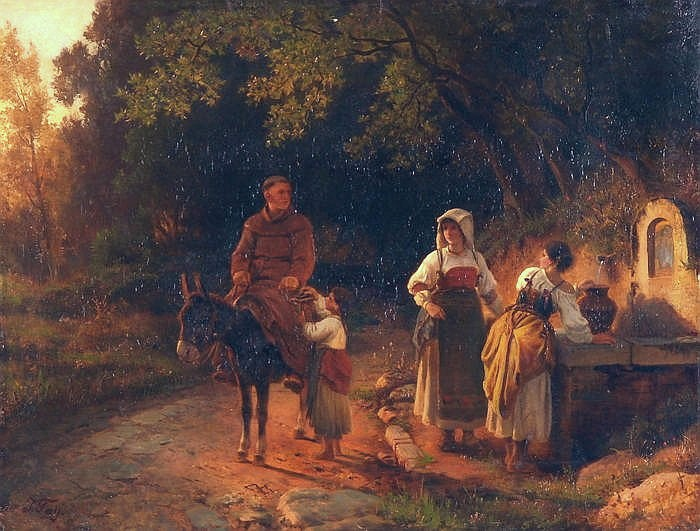
Roman peasant women at the well, with a Capuchin friar on his donkey

His wife, Marie (*1825), was the daughter of Heinrich Arnz (1785–1854), an owner of a publishing bookseller and printing shop (Arnz & Comp.). Through marriage, Fay was brother-in-law to the landscape painters Albert and Otto Arnz. Additionally, he was related to the painters Oswald Achenbach and Albert Flamm, who had both married his wife's sisters. Marie and Joseph fathered a son, who was the animal painter, Ludwig Fay.

Fay died in Düsseldorf on 27 July 1875, two weeks prior to his 62nd birthday.

== Reception ==
Joseph Fay's works bear witness to his significant capability in terms of both conception and technical ability. His earlier works frequently contained historical and romantic subjects, whilst his later paintings mainly featured genre scenes.

Fay extensively researched Italian life and culture across many trips to Italy, which are present in his pictures. His works are characterised by vivid colours, perceptive insight and skilful brushwork.

== Works ==
- Eine lauschende Thisbe
- Romeo et Julia
- Gretchen im Gefängnis
- Der nächtliche Ritter, um 1840
- Sampson trahi par Dalillah
- une mort d Cleopatre
- Customs and Life of the Ancient Germans
- Faust et Margurite
- Mephisto im Kerker
- die Badenden Römerinnen
- Still Waters Sydney Harbour
- Im Herbstwald
- Junge Frau
- Road from Blowering Dam
- Around the Campfire (1868)

== Sources ==
- Moritz Blanckarts (1877). "Fay, Josef" . Allgemeine Deutsche Biographie (in German). Vol. 6. Leipzig: Duncker & Humblot. pp. 590–591.
- Fay, Joseph. In: Friedrich von Boetticher: Malerwerke des neunzehnten Jahrhunderts. Beitrag zur Kunstgeschichte. Vol.I, Dresden 1895, pg. 288 f.
- Lisa Hackmann: "Fay (Fey), Joseph (Josef)" In: Bénédicte Savoy (Ed.): Pariser Lehrjahre. Ein Lexikon zur Ausbildung deutscher Maler in der französischen Hauptstadt. Vol.2: 1844–1870, De Gruyter, 2015 ISBN 978-3-11-031477-9
