= Albert Arnz =

German painter

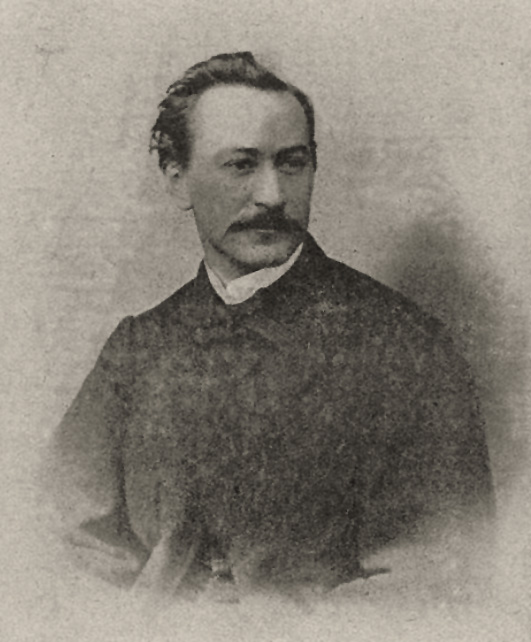
- Photo of Arnz
- Born: 24 January 1832; Düsseldorf, Kingdom of Prussia
- Died: 9 September 1914 (aged 82); Düsseldorf, Kingdom of Prussia, German Empire
- Known for: Painting
- Movement: Landscape

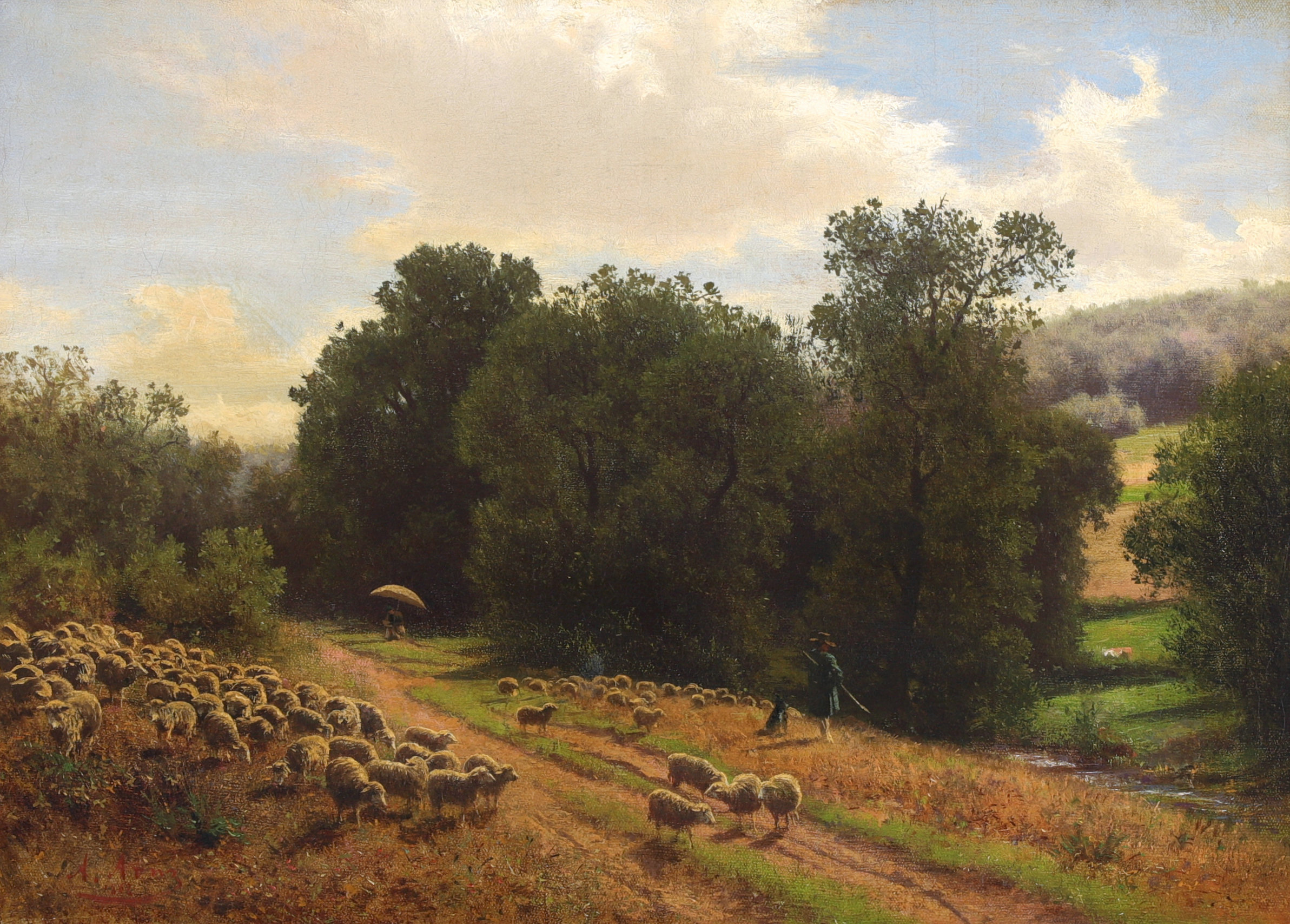
Shepherd with Sheep in a River Landscape

Albert Arnz (24 January 1832 – 9 September 1914) was a German landscape painter of the Düsseldorf school.

== Biography ==
Albert Arnz was the son of Maria Catharina Carolina and Heinrich Arnz (1785–1854), a well-known bookseller and printer (he owned Arnz & Comp.). He studied painting from 1854 to 1860 at the Kunstakademie Düsseldorf, there two of his teachers were Andreas and Oswald Achenbach. The latter married Arnz's sister Julie (born 1827), and with him he traveled to Italy a number of times. Another brother in law, the husband of his sister Marie Anna Fernandine (born 1829), was the Düsseldorfer painter Albert Flamm. Yet another brother in law, husband of Arnz's oldest sister Marie (born 1825), was the historical painter Joseph Fay. Arnz's brother August (born 1813) was the manager of the Arnz & Comp. location in Leiden until his death in 1846; his brother Carl (born 1821) was likewise a location manager for the company, while his brother Otto (born 1823) became a landscape painter like Albert, but oriented more toward realism. Finally, Friedrich (born 1826) married Antonetta Josepha, the sister of Düsseldorfer portrait and genre painter Philipp Schmitz (1824–1887), in 1851. Combined driver Benno von Achenbach and naval engineer Oswald Flamm were nephews of Arnz.

Arnz was a member of the art society Malkasten and participated in their tableaux vivants beginning in 1875. He lived at Schadowstraße 52, the location where in 1900 the Jugendstil-styled Ibach-Haus was built.

== Selected works ==
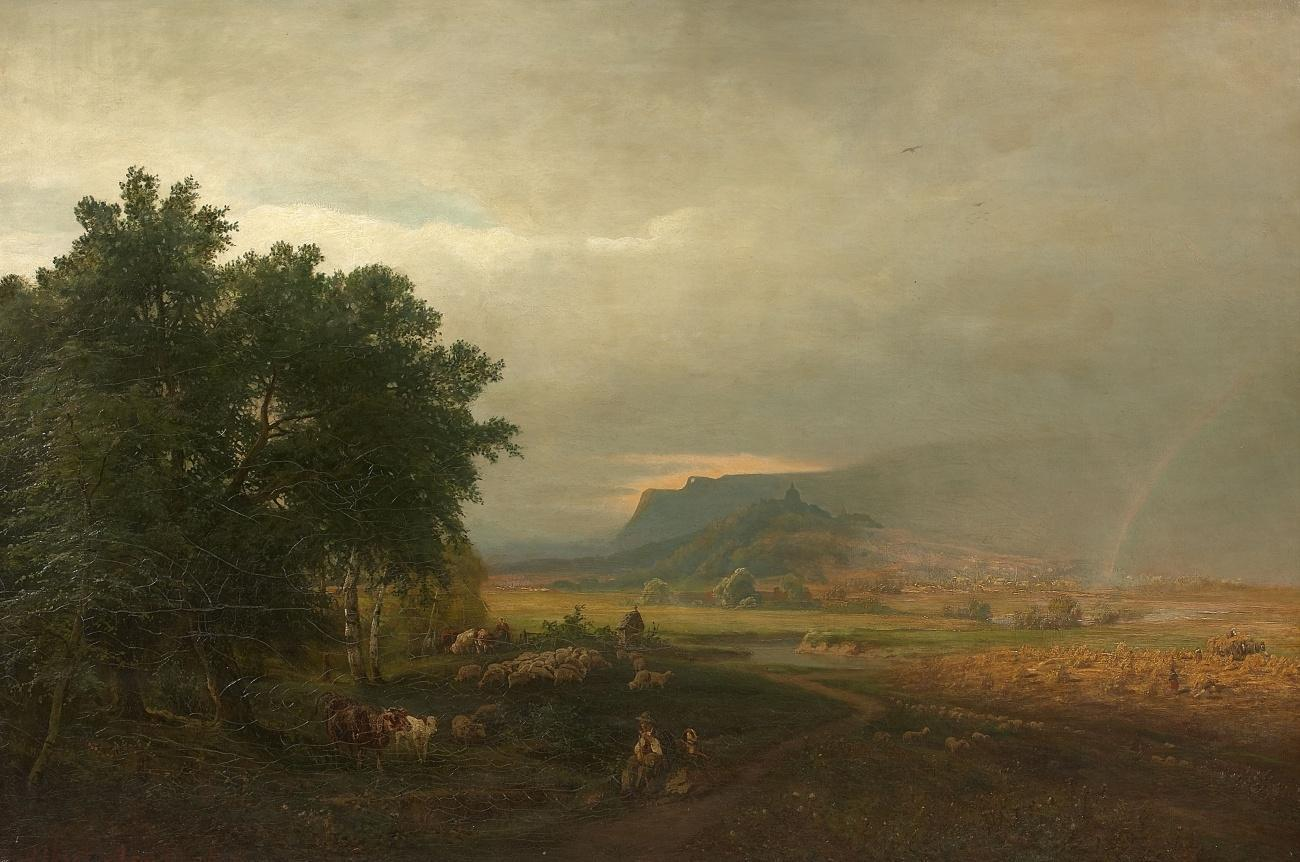
Blick auf die Burg Regenstein im Harz

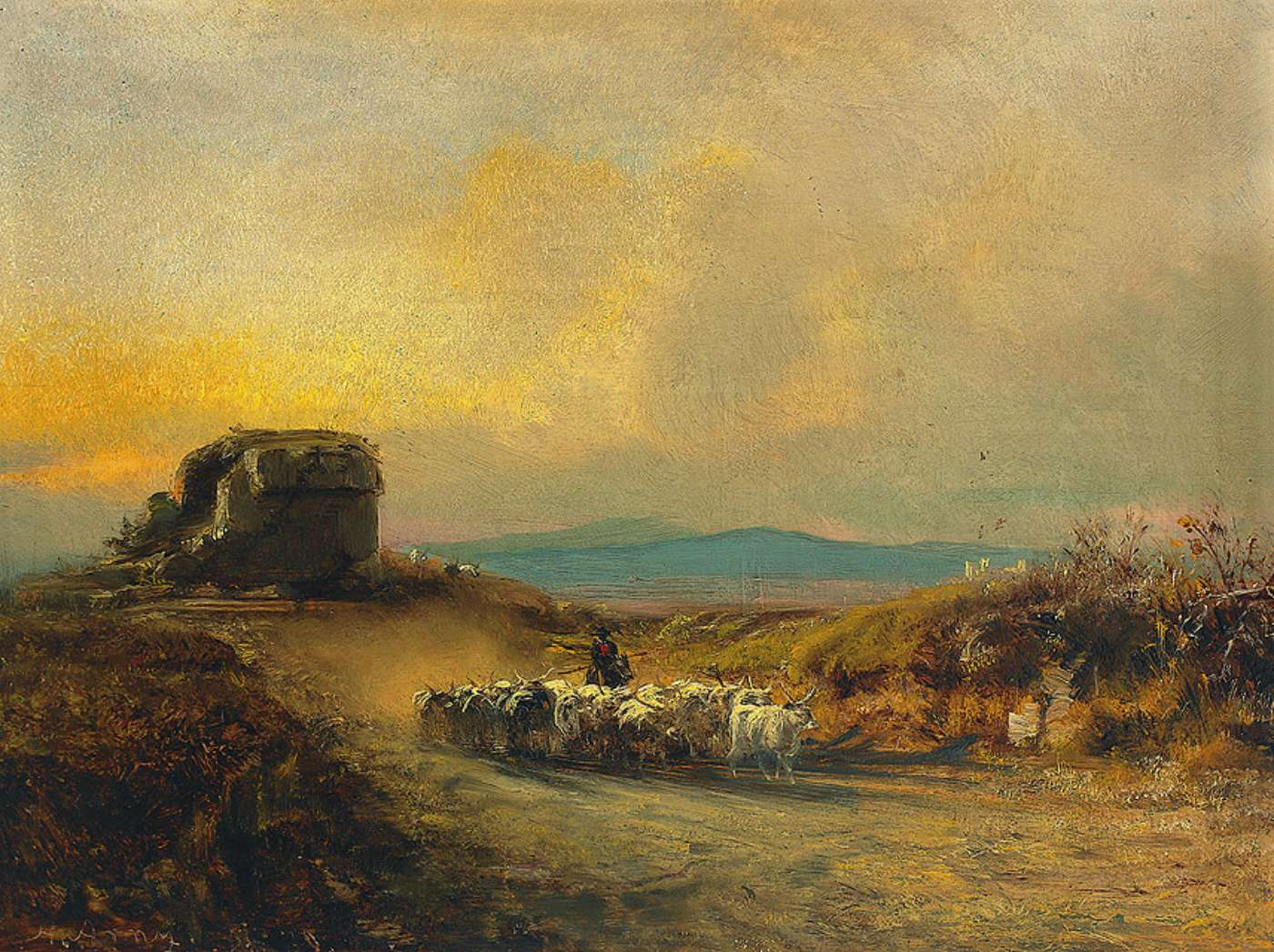
Heimkehrende Langhornrinder in der Campagna Romana, 1879

Arnz painted landscapes of Germany, Italy, and Switzerland. His paintings show his membership of the Düsseldorfer Schule, and many show a kinship with his teacher Oswald Achenbach, especially in their effective treatment of light and color.

- Blick auf die Burg Regenstein im Harz
- Schweizer Landschaft
- Waldlandschaft mit Schafherde
- Ruinen des alten Rom, 1869
- Das Kolosseum
- Strand bei Neapel, 1871
- Heimkehrende Langhornrinder in der Campagna Romana (Abendstimmung), 1879
- Der Venustempel von Baiae am Golf von Neapel, 1897
- Engelsbrücke in Rom mit Engelsburg und Petersdom, 1902

== Literatur ==
- Hermann Alexander Müller: Biographisches Künstler-Lexikon. Verlag des Bibliographischen Instituts, Leipzig 1882, S. 19 (Digitalisat)
- Hans Wolfgang Singer (ed.): Allgemeines Künstler-Lexikon. Sechster Band, zweiter Nachtrag mit Berichtigungen, Literarische Anstalt Rütten & Loening, Frankfurt am Main 1922, S. 3 (Digitalisat)
- Friedrich von Boetticher: Malerwerke des 19. Jahrhunderts. I/1, Dresden 1891, S. 40, Nr. 8
- Adolf Rosenberg: Geschichte der modernen Kunst. Volume 2: Die deutsche Kunst. F. W. Grunow, Leipzig 1894, p. 1
