= A Small Down Payment on Bliss =

1929 film

- Directed by: Jaap Speyer
- Written by: Jacques Bachrach; Max Ehrlich
- Produced by: Richard Eichberg
- Starring: Dina Gralla; Paul Hörbiger; Imre Ráday
- Cinematography: Bruno Mondi; Hugo von Kaweczynski
- Music by: Otto Stenzeel
- Production companies: British International Pictures; Richard Eichberg-Film
- Distributed by: Süd-Film
- Release date: 9 April 1929
- Country: Germany
- Languages: Silent; German intertitles

A Small Down Payment on Bliss (German: Ein kleiner Vorschuß auf die Seligkeit) is a 1929 German silent comedy film directed by Jaap Speyer and starring Dina Gralla, Paul Hörbiger, and Imre Ráday.

The film's art direction was by Willi Herrmann and Herbert O. Phillips.

== Cast ==
- Dina Gralla as Dolly Peters
- Paul Hörbiger as Theobald Nuddlich, Fabrikant
- Imre Ráday as Victor Santen
- Mimo von Delly as Ninette von der Haller-Revue
- Henry Bender as Gaston
- Adolphe Engers as Autohändler
- Jutta Jol as Alice
- Paul Michelo Kramer
- Sophie Pagay as Rosalie, Nuddlichs Frau
- Max Ralph-Ostermann as Mr. Hobby
- Bruno Ziener as Ein alter Roué
