= Fertility (film) =

1929 film

- Directed by: Eberhard Frowein
- Written by: Eberhard Frowein
- Produced by: Eugen Kürschner
- Cinematography: Kurt Kahle
- Production company: Verlag wissenschaftler Film
- Distributed by: Deutsche Universal-Film
- Release date: 1929
- Country: Germany
- Languages: Silent; German intertitles

Fertility (German: Fruchtbarkeit) is a 1929 German silent film directed by Eberhard Frowein. It was shot at the Terra Studios in Berlin.

== Cast ==
In alphabetical order

- Edward Barby as Dr. Friedrich Witte
- Valeria Blanka as Elinor, seine Frau
- Anny Eberty as Maria Huber
- Paul Henckels as Dr. Paul Märker
- Hanna Hoessrich as Marianne, seine Tochter
- Hans Oberländer as Ein Pfarrer
- Walter Steinbeck as Direktor Roeder

== Bibliography ==
- Ginsberg, Terri & Mensch, Andrea (ed.) A Companion to German Cinema. John Wiley & Sons, 2012.
