= Franz Xaver Setzer =

Austrian photographer

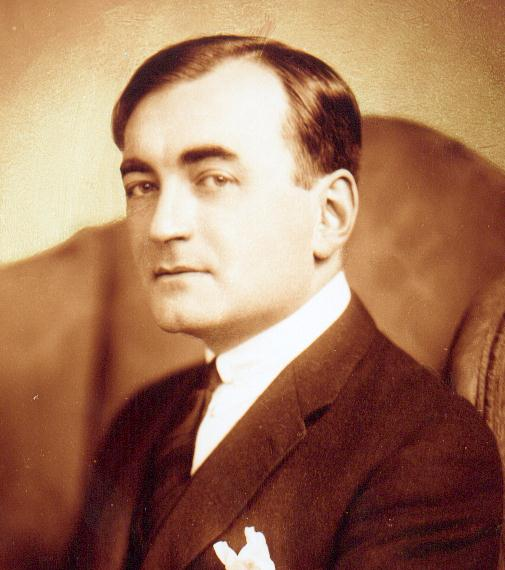
- Setzer in 1933
- Born: Franz Anton Adolf Xaver Setzer; 6 February 1886; Vienna, Austria-Hungary
- Died: 5 January 1939 (aged 52); Vienna, Austria
- Occupation: Photographer
- Known for: Portrait photography
- Spouse: Marie Gutheil-Schoder (m. 1920; died 1935)

Franz Xaver Setzer, actually Franz Anton Adolf (6 August 1886 in Vienna – 10 January 1939 in ibid) was an Austrian photographer.

== Biography ==
He received his training at the Imperial Royal Institute of Prints and Drawings, he later founded his own studio in 1909. Setzer saw his portraits as works of art, and the style of portraiture against an unvarnished background he used was considered very modern at that time. The news that the portraits created in Setzer's studio were of the highest artistic quality had quickly spread in Vienna during the interwar years. The well-lit studio in the attic of the Museumstrasse 5 in the 7th district in Vienna was one of the first addresses for portraits.

The ambience of "Setzer – Photographische Bildnisse, behind the German Volkstheater" – as an advertising card from early years describes the location – met the high demands and was equipped with "a lift and a telephone". Personalities from the theatre, opera and cultural scene of Setzer were portrayed in their early years. Among the first customers before 1920 were the composer Arnold Schönberg, the actress Hedwig Bleibtreu and the writer Stefan Zweig. He ran the studio with his future wife Friederike von Winternitz. In 1920 Setzer married the opera singer Marie Gutheil-Schoder this marriage expanded his social position. In addition to contemporary artists, representatives of the aristocracy, politicians and economists were increasingly included in the group of people who were photographed by Setzer.

Alternating photos show that Franz Xaver Setzer also had friendly contacts with his contemporary colleagues, such as Madame d'Ora and Arthur Benda.

Setzer made repeated trips to Salzburg. The Salzburg Festival was an opportunity to make photos on location – for example, of Giacomo Puccini, Max Reinhardt and Maria Jeritza – as well as receiving commissions for the studio in Vienna. In April 1920, twenty-year-old Marie Karoline Tschiedel took up a position as assistant to the artist in the studio. She had also studied at the KuK Graphische Lehr- und Versuchsanstalt and specialized in the fields of portrait photography and negative retouching.

The global economic crisis in the 1930s also affected the work in the studio. The situation deteriorated and Setzer withdrew, also for health reasons. Tschiedel, who had already worked closely with Setzer in recent years, became the technical director of the studio in 1934 and increasingly assumed overall responsibility for the studio.

At the age of 52, Franz Xaver Setzer died in January 1939 as a result of a serious illness. The last shot of Setzer is listed in the record book number, 18448. Marie Karoline Tschiedel took over the studio from his heirs and continued it under the name Setzer-Tschiedel until 1980.

== Awards ==
In recognition of the high quality of his work, Franz Xaver Setzer received the Voigtländer Medal of the Photographic Society in 1917.

== Works (selection of notable people) ==
An excerpt from the record and negative booklet of the Setzer-Tschiedel archive gives an overview of the extensive oeuvre of portraits taken in the studio of Franz Xaver Setzer and in the following years under Marie Karoline Tschiedel :

- Lena Amsel (1898–1929), dancer and actress
- Raoul Aslan (1886–1958), actor, civil and role models
- Rudolf Bayr (1919–1990), writer
- Hedwig Bleibtreu (1868–1958), civil and role models
- Enrico Caruso (1873–1921), Italian opera singer
- Vilma Degischer (1911–1992), actress
- Leon Epp (1905–1968), director, theatre director and actor
- Alfred Gerasch (1877–1955), German actor
- Marie Gutheil-Schoder (1874–1935), civil and role models
- Nora Gregor (1901–1949), civil and role models
- Lo Hesse (1889–1983?), Dancer
- Hans Jaray (1906–1990), actors, civil and role models
- Maria Jeritza (1887–1982), actress, civil and role models
- Franz Lehár (1870–1948), composer
- Lotte Lehmann (1888–1976), singer, civil and role models
- Wilhelm Miklas (1872–1956), Federal President
- Hans Moser (1880–1964), actor
- Harald Paulsen (1895–1954), civil and role models
- Giacomo Puccini (1858–1924), composer
- Maurice Ravel (1875–1937), composer
- Max Reinhardt (1873–1943), theatre and film director, director, theatre producer and theatre founder
- Rosa Albach-Retty (1874–1980), civil and role images
- Felix Salten (1869–1945), actor
- Arthur Schnitzler (1862–1931), writer
- Ernst Rüdiger Starhemberg (1899–1956), politician and Heimwehr leader
- Richard Strauss (1864–1949), composer
- Richard Tauber (1891–1948), tenor
- Hans Thimig (1900–1991), actor and director
- Helene Thimig (1889–1974), actress, director and theatre director
- Otto Tressler (1871–1965), role models
- Conrad Veidt (1893–1943), actors, civil and role models
- Bruno Walter (1876–1962), conductor
- Paula Wessely (1907–2000), actress, civil and role models
- Grete Wiesenthal (1885–1970), role models
- Anton Wildgans (1881–1932), lyricist and playwright
- Stefan Zweig (1881–1942), writer
- Karl Alwin (1891–1945), Orchestra conductor
