= Margarete Lanner =

German actress

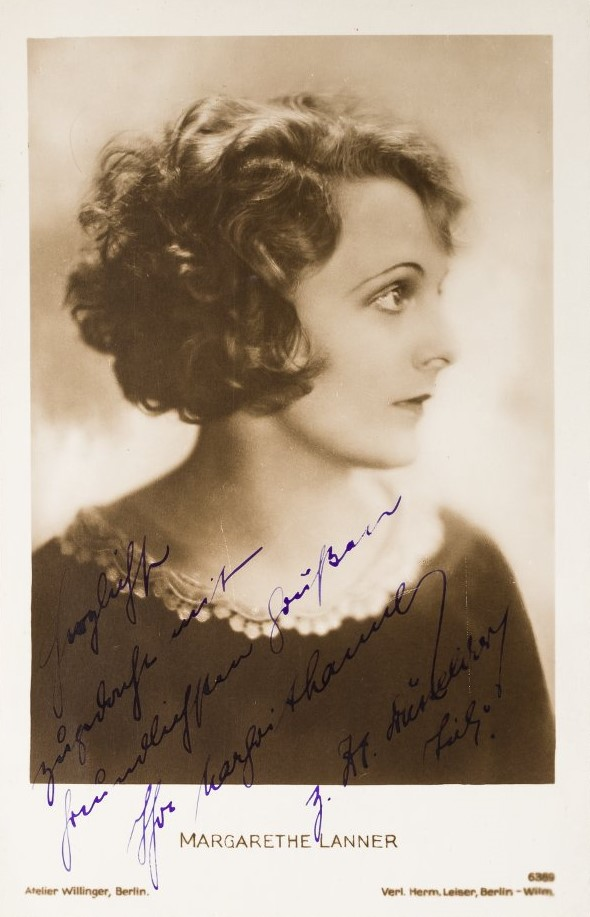
- Born: Margarethe Helene Langlotz; 17 February 1896; Hamburg, German Empire
- Died: 1981 (aged 84–85); Vienna, Austria
- Other names: Marga Lanner; Margaret, Countess Aichelburg
- Occupations: Film actor stage actor
- Years active: 1920–1936 (film)

Margarete Lanner (1896–1981) was a German stage and film actress. She appeared in around 30 films during the silent and early sound eras in a mixture of leading and supporting roles. She had a small part in Fritz Lang's 1927 film Metropolis.

== Partial filmography ==
- Colombine (1920)
- Love and Passion (1921)
- Don Juan (1922)
- Jimmy: The Tale of a Girl and Her Bear (1923)
- The Final Mask (1924)
- The Second Mother (1925)
- The Gentleman Without a Residence (1925)
- The Dice Game of Life (1925)
- The Telephone Operator (1925)
- Battle of the Sexes (1926)
- The Young Man from the Ragtrade (1926)
- Eternal Allegiance (1926)
- The Priest from Kirchfeld (1926)
- Metropolis (1927)
- The Woman from the Folies Bergères (1927)
- The Man with the Counterfeit Money (1927)
- A Girl of the People (1927)
- The Impostor (1927)
- The Woman from Till 12 (1928)
- The Hour of Temptation (1936)
- The Accusing Song (1936)

== Bibliography ==
- Jacobsen, Wolfgang & Sudendorf, Werner. Metropolis. Axel Menges, 2000.
