= The Pearl Maker of Madrid =

1921 film

- Directed by: Eberhard Frowein
- Written by: Emil Ferdinand Malkowski
- Starring: Hermann Wlach; Herma van Delden; Maria Merlott; Lo Bergner
- Cinematography: Willy Großstück
- Production company: Cela-Film
- Release date: 1 July 1921
- Country: Germany
- Languages: Silent; German intertitles

The Pearl Maker of Madrid (German:Der Perlenmacher von Madrid) is a 1921 German silent drama film directed by Eberhard Frowein and starring Hermann Wlach, Herma van Delden and Maria Merlott. It premiered in Berlin on 1 July 1921.

== Cast ==
- Hermann Wlach
- Herma van Delden
- Maria Merlott
- Lo Bergner
- Traute Berndt
- Eva Christa
- Richard Georg
- Kurt Hänsel
- Richard Kirsch
- Walter von Allwoerden

== Bibliography ==
- Grange, William. Cultural Chronicle of the Weimar Republic.Scarecrow Press, 2008.
