= Oskar Schlitter =

German diplomat and Nazi Party member

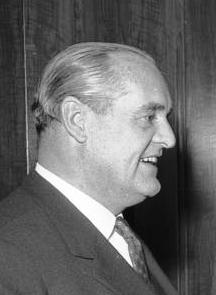
- Oskar Schlitter
- Born: Oskar Hermann Artur Schlitter; 15 June 1904; Essen, Germany
- Died: 12 November 1970 (aged 66); Offenstetten, Bavaria, West Germany
- Occupation: Diplomat
- Political party: Nazi Party (1934–1945)
- Spouse: Daisy D'ora (1913–2010)
- Children: Marion Schlitter von Cramm (1933–1984); Alexander Schlitter (1941-<2010)
- Parent: Oscar Schlitter (1868–1939)

Oskar Hermann Artur Schlitter (15 June 1904 – 12 November 1970) was a German diplomat. He was a Nazi Party member between 1934 and 1945 and excluded from the diplomatic service between 1945 and 1952, the year in which he returned to government service for what was now West Germany.

Between 1964 and 1970 he served as his country's ambassador in Athens.

Through his marriage to actress Daisy D'ora (Miss Germany 1931), he acquired a publicly popular wife to whom diplomatic discretion did not always come naturally.

== Life ==
=== Provenance and early years ===
Oskar Schlitter was born in Essen where his father, Oscar Schlitter (1868–1939), was the leading director at the Credit-Anstalt Bank.

He attended university in Munich and Berlin, studying law, economics and agriculture, and receiving a doctorate in the latter in 1928. He entered the diplomatic service in 1929 and in 1932 married the recently retired film actress and former Miss Germany, Daisy D'ora. Between 1932 and 1936, Schlitter was accredited to the German consulate in New York City.

=== Nazi years ===
It was during this period, in January 1933, that régime change came to Germany, and the new government lost no time in transforming the country into a one-party dictatorship. Oskar Schlitter joined the Nazi Party in 1934. Between 1936 and 1939 he was posted to the German embassy in London, serving under Ambassador von Ribbentrop with whom he worked closely.

In 1939 The Schlitters purchased the "schloss", together with the surrounding estate, at Offenstetten, in the hills east of Ingolstadt. The family moved to Offenstetten where Daisy and their two children lived during the World War II which resumed in September 1939, although Schlitter's work kept him away from home for most of this time.

=== War years ===
Between 1939 and 1943 he was based at the Foreign Office in Berlin's government quarter. He was involved in the diplomatic subterfuge preceding the invasion of Denmark in 1940, and carried instructions to the embassy, together with a general's uniform for Kurt Himer, in his diplomatic bag to Copenhagen on 9 April 1940, the day of the invasion. The information Schlitter delivered equipped Himer and the embassy staffs in Copenhagen and Oslo to know what was going on.

Within the service he was promoted from the rank of Legationssekretär to that of Legationsrat in April 1942.

Until 1942 Schlitter and Hans Schwarzmann were seconded to work for Otto Abetz on the subjugation of the occupied part of France. From 1943 till 1944 he was accredited as the German consul in Lugano (in neutral Switzerland). Thereafter, from 1944 till the end of the war in May 1945, Schlitter was employed in the Italian section of the commercial department of the foreign office.

=== Gentleman farmer ===
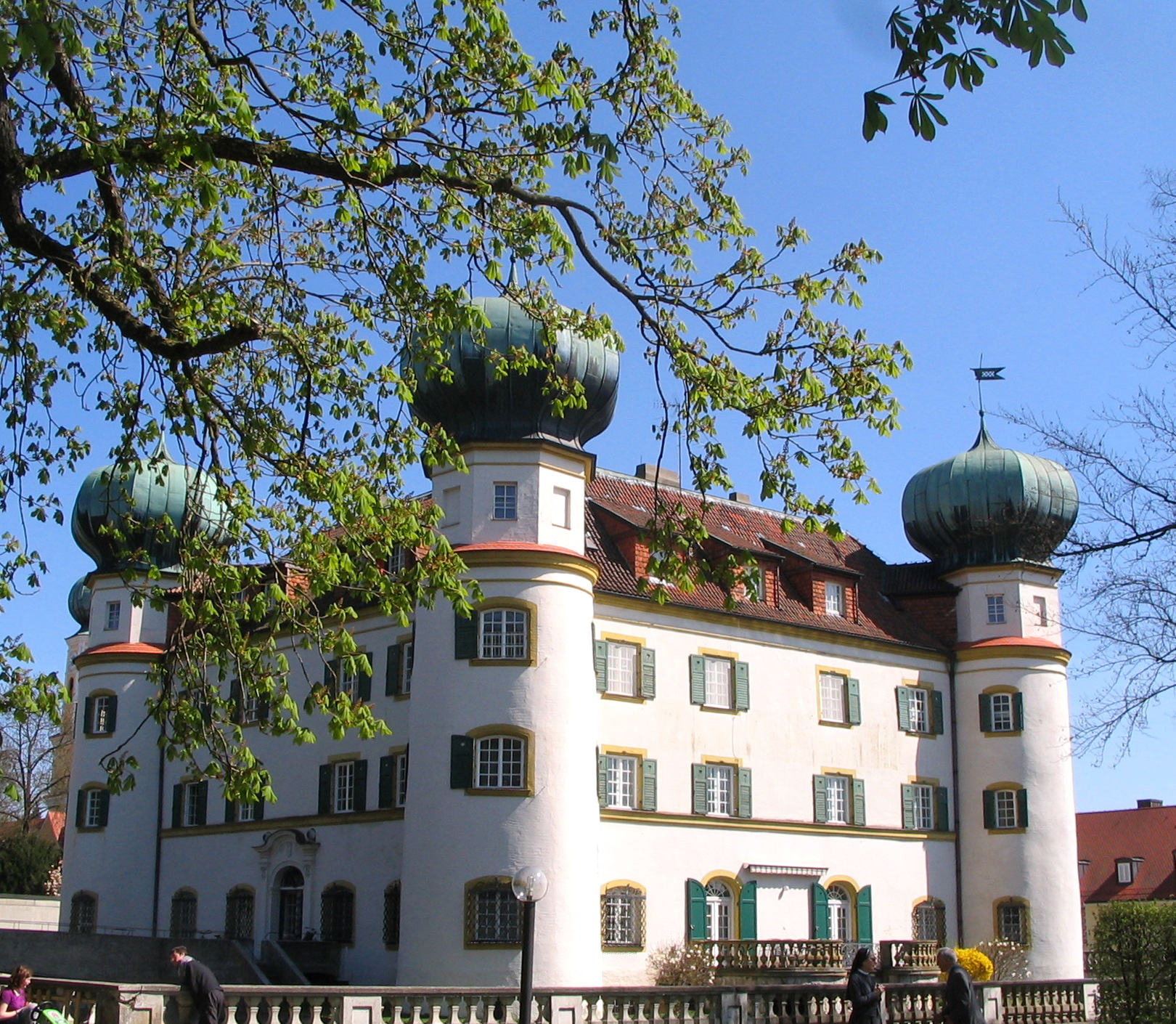
Schloss Offenstetten was acquired as a family home by Oskar Schlitter in 1939. He died there in 1970.

Between 1945 and 1952 Oskar Schlitter farmed the estate lands at Schloss Offenstetten. Directly after the war the southern part of Germany came under the military occupation of the US army. The grand home at Offenstetten was commandeered for use as an officers' training academy while the Schlitter family, according to one press report, inhabited a bomb shelter in the estate grounds.

By Christmas 1945, however, Daisy Schlitter had invoked the support of Bishop Michael Buchberger to have the Schloss converted into a refuge for some of the millions of the orphaned and refugee children arising from the war and ethnic cleansing in the confiscated territories to the east of the Oder-Neisse line. The refuge was administered by the Roman Catholic church. Oskar and Daisy Schlitter continued to live on the estate until, in the case of Daisy, the early years of the 21st-century.

=== Return to diplomacy ===
In 1949 the German Federal Republic, also known as West Germany, was founded in those parts of the country that since 1945 had been administered by the American, British and French armies. In 1952 Oskar Schlitter resumed his diplomatic career, with a posting to Madrid where for a year he served as deputy to the West German ambassador, Prince Adalbert of Bavaria. During this period Prince Adalbert took a three-month leave of absence and Schlitter found himself, as Chargé d'affaires, working as West German ambassador to Madrid in all but title.

After this he was switched to London, where the West German embassy was accommodated in the same premises as the German embassy where he had served under Joachim von Ribbentrop during the 1930s. According to one report Schlitter's transfer to London after so short a period in Madrid came about because of confusion on the part of Chancellor Adenauer between Oskar von John, a junior Minister for Agriculture, and Otto John, a diplomat with links to the intelligence community and an exceptionally controversial past. The West German ambassador in London between 1953 and 1955, Hans Schlange-Schöningen, had sought to have his friend, the junior agriculture minister Oskar von John, appointed to the London diplomatic post because, he said, he valued the man's agricultural expertise, but Adenauer thought he was being invited to endorse the appointment of Otto John. In the wake of the confusion the West German foreign office sent Oskar Schlitter, who also had a knowledge of agriculture along with his pre-war experience as a commercial attaché. Schlitter, accompanied by his distractingly glamorous wife, was nevertheless not the colleague his fellow West German diplomats in London had been expecting to welcome as their new chargé d'affaires.

=== Christmas party: Christmas speech ===
On 20 December 1954 the West German embassy held a Christmas party for embassy staff and their guests.

There were about 100 guests and the event was held in the grand "reception hall" of the embassy. Ambassador Schlange-Schöningen was away on holiday, and the event was hosted by Oskar Schlitter, as his chargé d'affaires. Schlitter faced a diary clash. Accompanied by his wife he greeted his guests, but then had to leave for a reception, being held to celebrate the European Coal and Steel Community, at the British Foreign Office. It would normally have fallen to the next person in the embassy chain of command to deliver a short speech of welcome to the assembled guests, but for some reason Oskar Schlitter instead asked his wife, Daisy to attend to this formality. Daisy duly improvised a speech. Reports of what she said are not totally consistent, but when translated into English it was reported that she had described the diplomatic posting to England as one to an "enemy country" or "enemy territory" ("Wir sind im feindlichen Ausland"). Someone reported the remark to the press and an embassy spokesmen hastened to reassure anyone listening that she had intended to use the less offensive word "fremdlich" (foreign) and not the toxic word "Feind" (enemy).

=== Media storm ===
Reports of Daisy Schlitter's remarks were picked up in London by the Daily Sketch, an English tabloid newspaper, and from there gained wider press traction internationally. Accompanied by his wife, and without waiting to be summoned, Oskar Schlitter departed for Bonn on Sunday 2 January 1955, leaving the embassy not in an embassy car but driven to the station by their daughter in her small black car, and taking a late night channel crossing on the Belgian ferry "Prince Baudouin". Schlitter insisted to reporters that his sudden departure had nothing to do with his wife's speech ten days earlier. Their children, Marion (then aged 21) and Alexander (then aged 12), remained in London: Marion was reported as telling journalists that she would run the home while their parents were away.

A helpful embassy spokesman was quoted as explaining that an enquiry had been set up concerning an indiscretion committed by a member of the chargé d'affaires's family. His offer to resign was communicated to Konrad Adenauer whose initial reaction was that any such resignation was out of the question. Josef Löns, the Foreign Office personnel chief, took a different view of the matter.

At this stage neither Schlitter's offer to resign nor Adenauer's instant dismissal of the idea had been communicated in writing, and having not been dismissed the Schlitters returned to the London embassy. Within the West German Foreign office, however, the matter was not so quickly laid to rest. British media interest rumbled on and the political establishment in London also appear to have remained resolutely unimpressed by the Schlitters' continued presence in their city.

Oskar Schlitter resigned from his London posting, effective 31 March 1955. For the diplomatic community one consequence of the affair was a tightening of the rules concerning what a diplomat's wife could and could not be permitted to do. A consequence for the Schlitters was a further lengthy period of "temporary retirement" ("einstweiligen Ruhestand") from Oskar's diplomatic career.

Back in London an agitated James Pettigrew, the Daily Sketch reporter who had given the affair such prominence since the beginning of January, attempted and failed to discuss the affair with the West German ambassador. He instead urged a bemused embassy press attaché that the ambassador should be recommended to lobby Chancellor Adenauer vigorously on the Schlitters' behalf. It was left to a German publication, Der Spiegel, to spell out, for the benefit of readers unfamiliar with English press priorities, that it would indeed be a terrible blow for the Daily Sketch if pictures of "Frau Daisy" were to disappear from the front pages.

=== Later years ===
Oskar Schlitter was welcomed back into the diplomatic world in 1958, working from that year until 1964 in the Trade and Development department of the Foreign Office. In 1963 he led an important series of trade negotiations with Yugoslavia. After the negotiations failed, on 13 July 1963 Schlitter found himself with an urgent appointment in London. Ordered back to Bonn by Secretary of state Carstens, on 19 July 1963 Schlitter explained to the US embassy official, Coburn Kidd, that Josip Broz Tito, the Yugoslav leader, had not been entitled to expect new West German credit guarantees or discussion of global restitution issues dating back to the war in the context of trade negotiations.

On simple humanitarian grounds, however, the government was prepared to increase damages payments for victims of pseudo-medical scientific experiments.

In February 1964, Schlitter was appointed West German ambassador to Athens. The posting was a sensitive one partly because the Civil War had ended in 1949 with Greece on the frontline in a politically divided Europe and because of raw memories dating back two decades to the German occupation of Greece. On 18 April 1966 Schlitter signed a double taxation treaty with the Greek government.

Schlitter was still in office as ambassador on 21 April 1967 when democracy in Greece formally ended, supplanted by dictatorship. The development did nothing to diminish the diplomatic sensitivity of the posting. On 27 June 1969 Schlitter found himself in negotiation with Georgios Papadopoulos and other members of Greece's ruling junta over a possible friendship agreement between their two countries. He tried to persuade the junta to loosen certain repressive measured on the home front in order that Bonn might persuade the Council of Europe against expelling Greece. As matters turned out, the junta were not prepared to compromise, however, and the Greek government anticipated expulsion by withdrawing from the Council of Europe in December 1969.

== Personal ==
Oskar Schlitter died in his wife's arms at the family home in Offenstetten on 12 November 1970. His death resulted from a heart attack.

Schlitter's 1932 marriage to Daisy D'ora (1913–2010) resulted in the birth of two children, both of whom were still alive in 1970, but would predecease their mother.
