= Marie Gutheil-Schoder =

German soprano

- Marie Gutheil-Schoder, as Salome, 1915
- Born: Marie Schoder; February 16, 1874; Weimar
- Died: October 4, 1935 (aged 61); Ilmenau, Germany
- Spouses: Gustav Gutheil (m. 1899; died 1914); Franz Xaver Setzer (m. 1920)

Marie Gutheil-Schoder (16 February 1874 – 4 October 1935) was an important German operatic soprano.

Born Marie Schoder in Weimar, she married Gustav Gutheil in 1899, with whom she lived until his death in 1914. In 1920, she married the photographer Franz Xaver Setzer.

She debuted in the secondary role of the First Lady at the Weimar Court Opera in The Magic Flute in her native city of Weimar in 1891. Gustav Mahler engaged her for the Vienna State Opera in 1900, where she remained until 1926. She played Octavian in the 1911 Austrian premiere of Der Rosenkavalier and many times thereafter. Another of her famous roles was her portrayal of a "strange, Nietzschean" Carmen. In 1914, she created Esmeralda in the world premiere of Franz Schmidt's opera Notre Dame. She was also seen in the 1922 Vienna premiere of Richard Strauss's ballet Josephslegende as Potiphar's Wife. Her other most frequent roles include Nedda in Pagliacci, Frau Fluth in The Merry Wives of Windsor, Martha in Tiefland, Mozart's Susanna, Pamina, and Donna Elvira, and the title roles in Richard Strauss's operas Salome and Elektra.

Gutheil-Schoder created the fiercely difficult single role of Arnold Schoenberg's monodrama Erwartung in 1924 in Prague; earlier that year, she performed his Pierrot lunaire. Mahler termed her "a musical genius," and she was highly regarded as a musician and singing-actress, although she seemed to be, as one Viennese critic wrote, "the singer without a voice."

In her fifties, Gutheil-Schoder became a stage director, supervising operas including Elektra (1926–31) and Le postillon de Lonjumeau (1927-1932) in Vienna.

She was a well-known teacher as well, one of her students being the mezzo-soprano Risë Stevens. She died at the age of 61, in Ilmenau, Germany.

== Recordings ==
In 1902, she recorded for Gramophone & Typewriter Company Records, in Vienna: Two excerpts from Carmen, an aria from The Merry Wives of Windsor, and duets from La dame blanche and Les contes d'Hoffmann were performed. She is heard in Volume I of EMI's The Record of Singing, in the duet from La dame blanche.

In 2004, Symposium Records issued a Compact Disc entitled Vienna – The Mahler Years. Included are the two duets Gutheil-Schoder recorded (with Franz Naval), along with recordings by Selma Kurz, Leo Slezak, Erik Schmedes, Lilli Lehmann, etc.
