= The Final Mask =

1924 film

- Directed by: Emmerich Hanus
- Starring: Margarete Lanner; Wilhelm Diegelmann
- Cinematography: Hans Kämpfe
- Distributed by: Vera-Filmwerke
- Release date: 11 January 1924
- Country: Germany
- Languages: Silent; German intertitles

The Final Mask (German:Die letzte Maske) is a 1924 German silent drama film directed by Emmerich Hanus and starring Margarete Lanner and Wilhelm Diegelmann.

== Cast ==
In alphabetical order

- Alf Blütecher
- Wilhelm Diegelmann
- Arnold Korff
- Margarete Lanner
- Martin Lübbert
- Louis Ralph

== Bibliography ==
- Grange, William. Cultural Chronicle of the Weimar Republic. Scarecrow Press, 2008.
