= Manfred Milinski =

German Biologist (born 1950)

Manfred Milinski (born 8 February 1950) is a German biologist who was Director of the Max Planck Institute for Evolutionary Biology.

== Career ==
He was born in 1950 in Oldenburg. He studied biology and mathematics in Bielefeld and Bochum, went to Oxford University on a Heisenberg Scholarship and in 1987 became Professor of Zoology and Behavioural Ecology at University of Bern. From 1999 to 2018 he has been Director and Scientific Member at the Max Planck Institute of Limnology, which in 2007 became the Max Planck Institute for Evolutionary Biology. He has been an Honorary professor at Kiel University since 2000.

His main research fields are Co-operation, Sexual selection and Host-parasite co-evolution. He is a member of the Leopoldina and the Faculty of 1000.

== Publications ==
His publications include:

- The collective-risk social dilemma and the prevention of dangerous climate change. PNAS 105:2291-2294 (2008) (with Sommerfeld, R. D., Krambeck, H.-J., Reed, F. A., Marotzke, J.)
- The efficient interaction of indirect reciprocity and costly punishment. Nature 444:718-723 (2006) (with Rockenbach, B.)
- Mate choice decisions of stickleback females predictably modified by MHC peptide ligands. PNAS 102:4414-4418 (2005) (with Griffiths, S., Wegner, K. M., Reusch, T. B. H., Haas-Assenbaum, A., Boehm, T.)
- Parasite selection for immunogenetic optimality. Science 301:1343 (2003) (with Wegner K. M., Kalbe M., Kurtz J., Reusch T. B. H.)
- Reputation helps solve the 'tragedy of the commons'. Nature 415:424-426 (2002) (with Semmann D., Krambeck H.-J.)
