= Daisy D'ora =

German model and actress (1913–2010)

- Born: Daisy Freiin von Freyberg zu Eisenberg; 26 February 1913; Potsdam, Germany
- Died: 12 June 2010 (aged 97); Munich, Germany
- Occupations: Actress, socialite
- Years active: 1928–1930
- Spouse: Oskar Schlitter
- Children: Alexander Schlitter; Marion Schlitter von Cramm (1933-1984)

Baroness Daisy von Freyberg zu Eisenberg, known professionally as Daisy D'ora, (26 February 1913 – 12 June 2010) was a German beauty queen, socialite and actress.

== Life and career ==
Born in Potsdam, Germany to an impoverished aristocratic family, she began her career in silent films, performing in the 1929 film Pandora's Box, starring Louise Brooks, which became a worldwide success. She earned acclaim for her star turn in The Missing Testament (1929), and appeared in a number of German features before leaving the screen around 1930. Her stage name was coined as a result of the taboo among German aristocratic families against using family names in mainstream industries. In May 1931, she was encouraged to enter the Miss Germany pageant, which would, in turn, take her to the Miss Universe contest.

D'ora died in Munich, Germany on 12 June 2010, at the age of 97. Her husband and their two children had died earlier.

== Selected filmography ==
- Pandora's Box (1929)
- The Last Testament (1929)
- The Youths (1929)
- Hungarian Nights (1929)
- The Man Without Love (1929)
- Only on the Rhine (1930)
