= Wolfgang Martin Schede =

German author (1898–1975)

Wolfgang Martin Schede (11 May 1898 – 4 January 1975) was a German writer, dancer, actor, choreographer, artist and photographer. He was credited with being for men's expressionist dance what Mary Wigman was for women's dance. After the experiment of running an expressionist theatre in Cologne, he founded a dance school there in 1923, and worked at the Theater Dessau from 1925. After World War II, he turned to writing, art and photography.

== Life ==
Born in Stuttgart, Schede ran an alternative theatre in Cologne after the First World War, named Kölner Expressionistische Bühne. Their announced goal was to be a new, "ecstatic" theatre of the people ("Wir wollen das neue Theater, das ekstatische Theater, das Theater des Menschen").") He and his collaborators had no money, made their stage sets from leftover paper rolls, and rejected traditions. They wanted to stage works by Ernst Toller, Ernst Barlach and Oskar Kokoschka, who had been neglected during the war. The first play was Toller's 1919 Die Wandlung (Transfiguration), performed three times and resulting in the town's demand to pay an entertainment tax (Vergnügungssteuer). The then-mayor, Konrad Adenauer, was impressed with the theatre program and cancelled the tax, but the theatre suffered from unprofessional acting.

Schede toured with recitations of poetry by Georg Trakl, Toller and Franz Werfel, and became interested in dance. He performed solo dance evenings with pieces expressing cult and religion, entitled for example Feierlicher Tanz (solemn dance) and Ägyptischer Tanz (Egyptian dance). In 1923, he founded a dance school called Institut für ästhetische Körpererziehung (Institute for Aesthetic Body Education), planning to focus on psyche and body experience (... das Psychische des Tanzes, das Erlebnis des Körpers) as a way to enlighten and liberate the child-like soul (... für eine Erhellung und Befreiung der ganzen kindlichen Psyche machen). He gave dance evenings to promote the school. When he performed the world premiere of Hiob, a Tanzlegende (dance legend) about Job at the Stadttheater Krefeld, a critic wrote: "Als Tänzer ist er das, was Mary Wigman als Tänzerin bedeutet. Eine eigenschöpferische Natur mit dem Weg ins Grosse, Absolute." (As a dancer he is what Mary Wigman meant for women dancers. An original nature with a way towards the great, absolute). Another reviewer noted that Schede made ancient cultures his own and expressed them in dance. A reviewer from an Essen paper wrote that Schede showed that he had used impulses from Sent M'ahesa and Mary Wigman, but in his own fresh way.

In the 1925–26 season, Schede was appointed ballet master at the theatre in Dessau. He formed a new troupe, including dancers from the Hamburg school of Rudolf von Laban such as Elvira Gläser, Carl von Hacht and Lore Jentsch. He staged classical ballets as well as chamber dance. He premiered an Inca legend Ogelala to music by Erwin Schulhoff. Bauhaus artist Oskar Schlemmer hoped for a collaboration.

Schede wrote poems, novels, plays and ballets. He wrote Kokua, a stage play, for which Harald Genzmer composed music in 1952/53. One of his novels was Einer namens Salvanel. Schede wrote a biography of Max Terpis, Farbenspiel des Lebens. Max Pfister Terpis. Architekt Tänzer Psychologe 1889–1958, published in 1960.

Schede was a prolific writer of educational radio plays for Schulfunk in Switzerland and Germany, including radio dramas, staged readings and literary adaptations.
