= The Last Testament =

1929 film

- Directed by: Rolf Randolf
- Written by: Emanuel Alfieri; Rolf Randolf; Otokar Hořký
- Starring: Carlo Aldini; Daisy D'Ora; Hans Junkermann
- Cinematography: Robert Lach
- Production companies: Hom-Film; Bratři Deglové
- Distributed by: Deutsch-Russische Film
- Release date: 5 July 1929
- Running time: 72 minutes
- Countries: Germany; Czechoslovakia
- Languages: Silent; German/Czech intertitles

The Last Testament (German: Das verschwundene Testament; Czech: Ztracená závěť) is a 1929 German-Czech silent film directed by Rolf Randolf and starring Carlo Aldini, Daisy D'Ora, and Hans Junkermann.

The film's art direction was by Heinrich Richter.

== Cast ==
- Carlo Aldini as Boxer Frank Ward
- Daisy D'Ora as Lily von Ehrenberg
- Hans Junkermann as Baron Walter Levkowitz
- Julia Serda as Clothilde, Baron's wife
- Jan W. Speerger as Thomas Black
- Sig Arno as Thief Pale
- John Mylong as von Malten
- Mia Pankau as Lulu, Mädel der Alhambra (as Maria Pankau)
- Ida Fuchs as Fru-Fru
- Grete Neusiedel as Schu-Schu
- Louis Brody

== Bibliography ==
- Bock, Hans-Michael; Bergfelder, Tim, eds. (2009). The Concise Cinegraph: Encyclopaedia of German Cinema. New York: Berghahn Books. ISBN 978-1-57181-655-9.
