= Marriage (1929 film) =

1929 film

- German: Die Ehe
- Directed by: Eberhard Frowein
- Written by: Theodoor Hendrik van de Velde
- Starring: Lil Dagover
- Cinematography: Kurt Kahle; Victor Trinkler
- Music by: Artur Guttmann
- Production company: Laender Film
- Distributed by: Länderfilm
- Release date: 23 April 1929
- Country: Germany
- Languages: Silent; German intertitles

Marriage (German: Die Ehe) is a 1929 German silent film directed by Eberhard Frowein and starring Lil Dagover.

== Cast ==
In alphabetical order:

- Lil Dagover
- Gustav Diessl
- Maria Matray
- Livio Pavanelli
- Daisy Spies
- Ernst Stahl-Nachbaur
- Antonie Strassmann
- Max Terpis
- Hertha von Walther
- Hanna Waag

== Bibliography ==
- Ginsberg, Terri & Mensch, Andrea (ed.) A Companion to German Cinema. John Wiley & Sons, 2012.
