= Georg Wigand =

German bookseller and publisher (1808–1858)

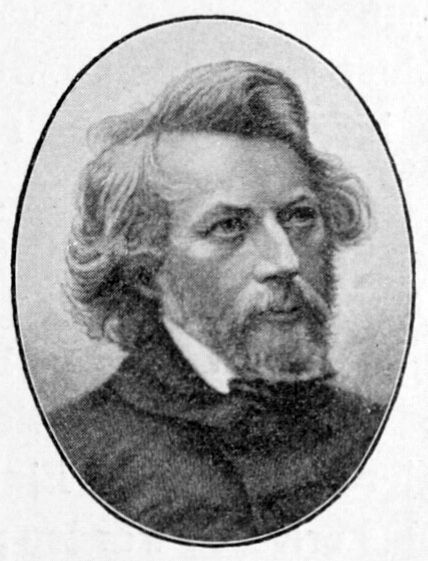
- Born: February 13, 1808; Göttingen, Kingdom of Hanover
- Died: February 9, 1858 (aged 49); Leipzig, Kingdom of Saxony
- Occupations: Bookseller, publisher
- Spouse: Caroline Heckenast (m. 1831)
- Children: 1 daughter, 2 sons
- Relatives: Otto Friedrich Wigand (brother)

Georg Wigand (13 February 1808 – 9 February 1858) was a German bookseller and publisher from Hanover. He founded a prominent publishing house in Leipzig that became known for its illustrated books and popular editions, particularly collaborating with renowned artists such as Ludwig Richter.

== Early life and career ==
Georg Wigand was born in Göttingen as the twelfth child of Friedrich and Johanna Wigand. He grew up in a prominent family that had been impoverished by war. In 1822, he moved to Košice in Upper Hungary, where he completed an apprenticeship at his brother Otto Friedrich Wigand's bookstore. Otto Friedrich later distinguished himself as both a publisher and politician.

In 1829, Georg took over his brother's business, and in 1831 he married Caroline Heckenast, with whom he had one daughter and two sons. The family relocated to Leipzig in 1834, where Wigand established his eponymous publishing house.

Politically, Wigand aligned himself with the Vormärz movement and belonged to a circle of moderate liberals.

== Publishing career ==
Wigand's publishing house quickly gained prominence through several successful ventures. He published the first popular German edition of the works of William Shakespeare and the multi-volume series Das malerische und romantische Deutschland (The Picturesque and Romantic Germany) from 1836 to 1842, both of which achieved considerable commercial success.

The publisher built his reputation primarily through illustrated books, working closely with celebrated painter Ludwig Richter, who created numerous drawings for works in Wigand's catalog. He also collaborated with other prominent artists including Peter von Cornelius, Moritz von Schwind, and Julius Schnorr von Carolsfeld. With Schnorr von Carolsfeld, he produced an illustrated Bible beginning in 1852. Wigand's initiatives and innovations contributed significantly to the development of wood engraving techniques.

His publishing catalog encompassed diverse genres including almanacs, children's literature, collections of fairy tales, and encyclopedias. He also published periodicals and scientific works, demonstrating the breadth of his editorial interests.

In Switzerland, he developed a close friendship with Albert Bitzius (known by his pen name Jeremias Gotthelf), a pastor and novelist from Lützelflüh. Between 1851 and 1853, Wigand published three stories by Gotthelf in his Deutscher Volkskalender: Ein deutscher Flüchtling, Le marchand de balais de Rychiswyl (featuring nine illustrations by Richter), and Ich strafe die Bosheit der Väter an den Kindern bis ins dritte und vierte Glied. He also republished Gotthelf's story Die Erbbase, which appeared in 1851 with seven lithographs by Adolf Erhardt in a volume of the Deutscher Volksbücher series.

== Death and succession ==
Georg Wigand died on 9 February 1858 in Leipzig. Following his death, the publishing house was initially taken over by his wife Caroline Wigand and Albrecht Kirchhoff, and later by his younger son, Martin Wigand, ensuring the continuation of the family business.

== Bibliography ==
- Pfau, Karl Friedrich: «Wigand, Georg», in: Allgemeine Deutsche Biographie, vol. 42, 1897, pp. 449–451.
- Schmidt, Rudolf: Deutsche Buchhändler. Deutsche Buchdrucker, vol. 6, 1908, pp. 1043–1047 (reprint 1979).
- Hunziker, Rudolf: «Jeremias Gotthelf und Georg Wigand. Ihr Briefwechsel», in: Muschg, Walter; Hunziker, Rudolf (ed.): Dichtung und Forschung. Festschrift für Emil Ermatinger. Zum 21. Mai 1933, 1933 (offprint).
- Aeberhardt, Werner E.: Hundert Jahre Illustrationen zu Gotthelf und Gotthelfbilder, 1937.
- Hundt, Martin (ed.): Der Redaktionsbriefwechsel der Hallischen, Deutschen und Deutsch-Französischen Jahrbücher (1837–1844), vol. 1, 2010, p. 190.
