= Klaus Sator =

German teacher, political scientist, historian, author and information manager

Klaus Sator (born 1956) is a German grammar school teacher, political scientist, historian, author and Information manager.

== Career ==
Sator wrote his doctoral thesis in 1994/95 at the Technische Hochschule Darmstadt on The rise of Hitler and Henlein and the Sudeten German labour movement. He published his own works on topics such as persecution of homosexuals in National Socialism, sexual denunciations and the relationship between sport and dance and homosexuality. Currently he works as literary editor in the press documentation at the Deutscher Bundestag in Berlin. Since 2012 he has been working in the Department of History, Politics and Contemporary History in the Academic Services of the Bundestag.

== Publications (selection) ==
- Bernd-Ulrich Hergemöller: Mann für Mann: Biographisches Lexikon zur Geschichte von Freundesliebe und mannmännlicher Sexualität im deutschen Sprachraum, with contributions by Klaus Sator et al., Berlin; Münster: Lit, 2010, ISBN 978-3-643-10693-3
- Klaus Vondung, Klaus Sator: Faunübernzaun / Neue Arbeiten zu einem mythologischen Prinzip / Olaf neopan Schwanke, Catalogue for the exhibition at the Städtische Galerie Haus Seel and subsequent exhibitions, Siegen [i.e. Biersdorf, Steinbaum 20]: O. n. Schwanke, 2004
- Klaus Sator: Anpassung ohne Erfolg / Die sudetendeutsche Arbeiterbewegung und der Aufstieg Hitlers und Henleins 1930–1938, zugleich Dissertation an der Technischen Hochschule Darmstadt, 1994/95 under the title: Sator, Klaus: Der Aufstieg Hitlers und Henleins und die sudetendeutsche Arbeiterbewegung, in the series WB-Edition Universität / mit der Carlo-und-Karin-Giersch-Stiftung der Technischen Hochschule Darmstadt, vol. 2, Darmstadt: Wissenschaftliche Buchgesellschaft [Abt. Verl.], 1996, ISBN 3-534-12925-3
- Klaus Sator: Grosskapital im Faschismus / dargestellt am Beispiel der IG-Farben, in the series Marxistische Taschenbücher, vol. 122, Frankfurt am Main: Marxistische Blätter publishing house, 1978, ISBN 3-88012-541-4
