= Erich Ziegel =

German theatre director and actor

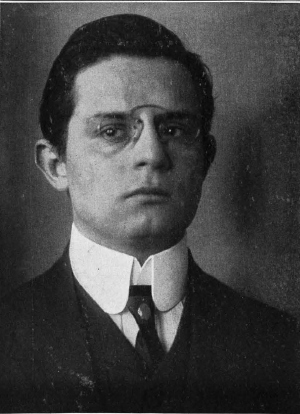
- Born: 26 August 1876; Schwerin an der Warthe, German Empire
- Died: 30 November 1950 (aged 74); Munich, West Germany
- Occupation: Actor
- Years active: 1920–1950

Erich Ziegel (26 August 1876 – 30 November 1950) was a German theatre director and actor. He appeared in more than forty films from 1920 to 1950. He was the founder of the Hamburg Kammerspiele.

== Selected filmography ==
Year	Title	Role	Notes
1948	The Trial		
1947	The Immortal Face		
1944	The Degenhardts		
1943	Back Then		
1941	Goodbye, Franziska		
1941	Six Days of Leave		
1939	We Danced Around the World		
1939	Midsummer Night's Fire		
1939	Detours to Happiness		
1938	The Deruga Case		
1938	Dance on the Volcano		
1938	The Mountain Calls		
1938	The Muzzle		
1938	Heimat		
1938	Sergeant Berry		
1937	Land of Love		
1937	The Citadel of Warsaw		
1937	To New Shores		
1921	The Red Night		
