= Carl Sieg =

German painter

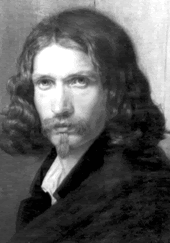
Self-portrait (date unknown)

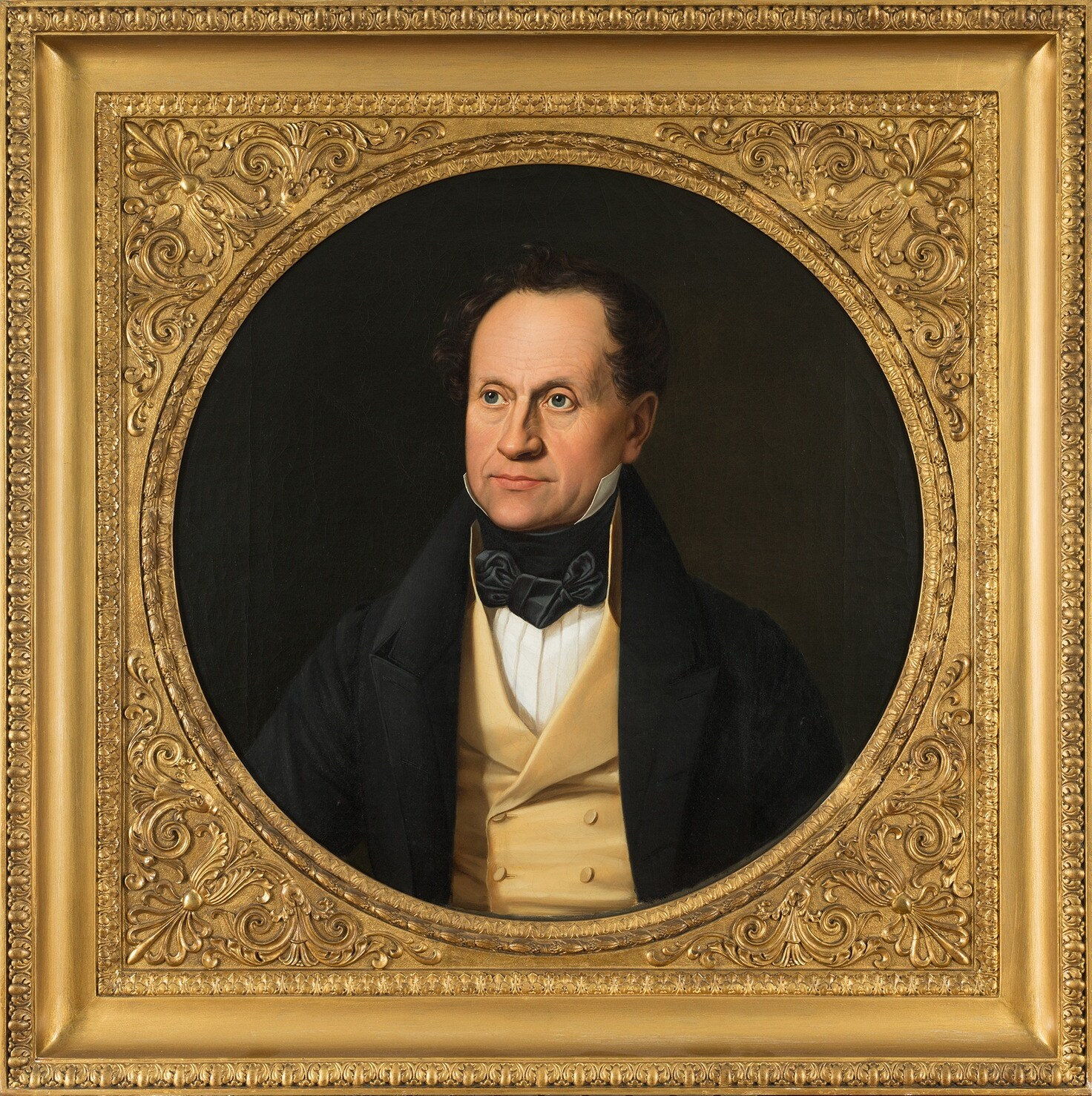
Portrait of Wilhelm Anton von Klewitz

Carl Sieg (4 August 1784 – 13 April 1845, in Magdeburg) was a German portrait painter and lithographer.

== Life and work ==
Born in Magdeburg, the son of bookbinder Friedrich Christian Sieg, he studied painting at the Academy of Arts in Berlin and at the provincial art school in Magdeburg. From 1808 he studied with Franz Ludwig Catel in Paris, where he also took classes in the painting school of Jacques-Louis David. From 1813 to 1816 he lived in Italy, mainly Rome, where he helped found the Künstlerhilfskasse and worked alongside artists Peter von Cornelius, Johann Friedrich Overbeck and Wilhelm von Schadow. Except for the years 1819–21, when he worked in Berlin, he spent the rest of his life in his hometown, working primarily as a lithographer and portraitist. In Magdeburg, he created numerous portraits of members of various prominent local families as well as portraits of clergymen and politicians.

A particularly praised piece he made was an altarpiece depicting the laying of Christ's body at the foot of the cross by Joseph of Arimathea (Niederlegung des Leichnams Christi am Fuße des Kreuzes durch Joseph von Arimathia, 1818) for the church of St. Sebastian in Magdeburg. In commemoration of the 200th anniversary of the destruction of Magdeburg (1631) during the Thirty Years' War, he painted a portrait of celebrated Lutheran pastor Reinhard Bake (1587–1657). A number of Sieg's works are in the collections of the Kulturhistorisches Museum in Magdeburg.

He died in Magdeburg at the age of 60.
