= Paul Eugen Sieg =

German physicist and writer

Paul Eugen Sieg (2 August 1899 – 2 May 1950) was a German physicist and science fiction writer. Initially popular during the 1930s, writing Detatom in 1936, his books were reprinted following World War II. Two of his books, Insula and Angolesa, were published posthumously in 1953 and 1954, respectively.
