= James Robert Parish =

American author, entertainment historian, and biographer

- Born: 21 April 1946 (age 80); Cambridge
- Occupation: Writer
- Alma mater: University of Pennsylvania
- Genre: Biography, history

Website
- www.jamesrobertparish.com

James Robert Parish (born April 21, 1946) is an American author, entertainment historian, and biographer. He also is a former entertainment reporter (for Variety), former book editor, former publicist and former lawyer (in New York).

He is the author of more than 100 books including biographies, histories and reference works, and is known for his knowledge of Hollywood legend and lore, fact, and anecdote. He is also claimed to have developed the genre of Hollywood nostalgia. Some of his notable books include Fiasco: A history of Hollywood's iconic flops, The Hollywood Book of Death, The Hollywood Book of Breakups, The Hollywood Book of Extravaganza, and It's Good to Be the King.

As a consultant for TV documentaries and biographies, he has appeared frequently on national news shows and specials dealing with the performing arts. Some of his notable appearances include Dateline NBC, A&E Biography, E!'s Mysteries and Scandals and E! True Hollywood Story, Court TV's Hollywood Justice, Fox News Channel's Rita Cosby Show and American Broadcasting Company's Cops on the Screen. He also worked for specials and series episodes produced by England's BBC, Granada TV, and Channel 4. He lives in Studio City, California.
