= Bernd-Ulrich Hergemöller =

German historian (1950–2023)

- Born: October 22, 1950; Münster, West Germany
- Died: October 14, 2023 (aged 72); Münster, Germany
- Occupations: Historian, medievalist, university professor
- Employer: University of Hamburg

Bernd-Ulrich Hergemöller (born 22 October 1950 in Münster; died 14 October 2023 in Münster) was a German historian and professor of medieval history at the University of Hamburg.

== Biography ==
Hergemöller was born in Münster and studied Catholic theology, philosophy and history. He received his doctorate in 1978; writing a dissertation about the Golden Bull of Emperor Charles IV of Luxembourg. In 1984, he qualified as a professor and received his habilitation with a thesis on the Pfaffenkriege ("priests’ wars") in the Hanseatic region during the High Middle Ages.

He served as a professor at Ruhr University Bochum from 1992 to 1996. In 1996, he was appointed professor of medieval studies in the Faculty of Humanities at the University of Hamburg, where he worked until 2012.

Hergemöller published approximately 300 books and articles, mainly focusing on urban social history and marginalized groups. He also translated numerous historical sources about the study of male homosexuality in medieval cities such as Cologne, Münster, Venice, Augsburg, and Basel.

In addition to his academic work, Hergemöller was active in local politics, serving as a city councillor in Münster from 1984 to 1987. He was a member of the Historical Commission for Mecklenburg too.

== Selected works ==
- Randgruppen der spätmittelalterlichen Gesellschaft, ein Hand- und Studienbuch, Warendorf 1994, Neue = 3. Aufl. 2001, ISBN 3-925522-20-4
- Mann für Mann, Biographisches Lexikon zur Geschichte von Freundesliebe und männlicher Sexualität im deutschen Sprachraum, Hamburg 1998, ISBN 3-928983-65-2
- Sodom und Gomorrha: Zur Alltagswirklichkeit und Verfolgung Homosexueller im Mittelalter, 2., überarbeitete und ergänzte Auflage. Hamburg 2000, Neuausg. Hamburg: MännerschwarmSkript-Verl., ISBN 3-928983-81-4
