= William Grange =

American liberal arts academic

William Marshall Grange is Professor of Theatre at the University of Nebraska–Lincoln's Johnny Carson School of Theatre and Film. His research publications are mostly concerned with the history of German-language theater and German-language literature. The author of over a dozen books, his most recent work was Cabaret (London, UK: Methuen, 2021). He is also the author of numerous book chapters, articles in scholarly journals, reviews of both books and productions, and has presented dozens of papers at scholarly conferences both in the United States and abroad.

== Biography ==
William Grange was born in Cincinnati and attended Thomas A. DeVilbiss High School in Toledo. During 1964 and 1965, DeVilbiss High School won two state titles and 1965 senior class president Randy Wertz nearly captured the state championship in tennis. The state championships awarded to DeVilbiss were in high school radio announcing (sponsored by Ohio State University) and in competitive patriotic speech (sponsored by the Sons of the American Revolution). Grange won the state championship in both contests.

=== Theatrical career ===
William Grange performed with the Light Opera of Manhattan and the Public Theater in New York while still attending Columbia University. He later acted with the Alabama Shakespeare Festival, TheatreWorks USA (New York), National Theatre Company (New York), Mark I Dinner Theatre (Florida), Haymarket Theatre Lincoln, and Nebraska Repertory Theatre. He has been a member of Actors' Equity Association since 1972.

=== Academic career ===
Grange graduated in 1970 from the University of Toledo with a Bachelor of Arts degree. In 1972 he received a Master of Fine Arts degree from Columbia University in New York City, with a thesis titled "The Role of Tusenbach in Chekhov's 'The Three Sisters.'" He received a doctorate from Indiana University in 1981 with a dissertation titled "The Collaboration of Carl Zuckmayer and Heinz Hilpert.".

=== Florida Southern College ===
At Florida Southern College, a small liberal arts institution in Lakeland, Florida and affiliated with the United Methodist Church, Grange chaired the Department of Theatre Arts and taught both academic and performance courses. He encountered difficulties with College officials when he staged the musicals Cabaret and Grease, because some considered the shows too racy for a Methodist institution. His productions of Shakespearean comedies and dramas by Henrik Ibsen, along with the Humperdinck opera Hansel and Gretel with mezzo-soprano Beverly Wolff met with approval. College administrators were nevertheless pleased when he left Florida Southern to accept a position at Marquette University in Milwaukee, Wisconsin.

=== Marquette University ===
Grange chaired the Performing Arts Department and directed numerous musicals at Marquette University, a Roman Catholic institution in Milwaukee, Wisconsin affiliated with the Jesuit Order. Among them were Happy End and A Funny Thing Happened on the Way to the Forum. He also directed new translations of dramas by Bertolt Brecht. He ran afoul of numerous Roman Catholic strictures at the Jesuit institution, though he published two books and several articles, and won fellowships from the German government and the National Endowment for the Humanities with full support from the Jesuit fathers. Other Roman Catholics, however, were glad when he departed in 1996 for the University of Nebraska.

=== University of Nebraska ===
At the University of Nebraska–Lincoln since 1996, Grange has published several books, scholarly articles, and received numerous international awards for his scholarship and teaching, including three Fulbrights and five fellowships from the Deutscher Akademischer Austauschdienst (German Academic Exchange Service). The Actors' Fund of America cited Grange in 2014 with its "Encore Award" for his "contributions to the acting profession." He has also received university awards from parents of Nebraska students. In the university's Johnny Carson School of Theatre and Emerging Media, he has taught mostly academic courses in theatre history, script analysis, film technology, and seminars on various film actors and genres. While serving as Chairman of the Graduate Committee in the Johnny Carson School, his colleagues elected him their representative to the Faculty Senate for several three-year terms. After terms in the Faculty Senate, he has served as a consultant for several European publication and institutional boards. He retired from active teaching and service at the University of Nebraska–Lincoln in 2023, but continues his research, scholarly, and editorial activity as Professor emeritus

== Honors ==
In 2010, Grange was guest professor at the University of Heidelberg; in 2007, he held the Fulbright Distinguished Chair in Humanities and Cultural Studies at the University of Vienna, teaching in German. He also taught in German during 2000–2001 as Fulbright Guest Professor at the University of Cologne.

He has received five research fellowships from the German Academic Exchange Service; he was also the recipient of awards and fellowships from the Harry Ransom Humanities Research Center; the National Endowment for the Humanities; the Dorot Foundation in Providence, Rhode Island; the Mellon Foundation, the International Institute of Education, the Hixson-Lied Trust Endowment, and the Jane Harrison Lyman Research Trust Fund. He twice received seed grants in the humanities from the vice-chancellor for research at the University of Nebraska–Lincoln.

== Publications ==
“Response to 'Thornton Wilder: Why here? Why now?’ by Emilio deGrazia, Thornton Wilder Journal 4 No. 2 (2023) 172–176. “Brecht’s Conception of Mehrwert (Added Value) in Acting for the Stage,” New England Theatre Journal 34 (2023) 13–25. “Forum: Humour” German History 33 No. 4 (2015), 609–623. “Oskar Blumenthal and the Lessing Theater in Berlin, 1888-1904,” Text and Presentation XXV (2004): 24–37. “The Theatrical Concession System in Prussia, 1811-1869,” Theatre Annual 57 (2004) 17–40. “Bernd Wilms and the Deutsches Theater in Transition,” Western European Stages XVI No. 1 (2004): 11–18. “Promise Me Nothing on Heroes’ Square: Marianne Hoppe's Twentieth Century,” New England Theatre Journal XIV (2003): 59-80. “Foreign-language Comedy Production in the Third Reich,” Metamorphoses, VII (Winter 2001) 179–196. “Theodor Lebrun and Industrial Comedy Space in Nineteenth Century Berlin,” On-Stage Studies XXII (Fall, 1999): 16–31. “Ersatz Comedy in the Third Reich,” Text and Presentation XXI (1999), 17–29. “Hitler’s ‘Whiff of Champagne:’ Curt Goetz and Celebrity in the Third Reich,” Theatre Annual 51 (1998): 15-26. “The Blondest of the Blondes: National Socialist Paradigms for a New German Theatre.” New England Theatre Journal VI No. 2 (1995): 33–45. “‘Tweaked Roman’ in The Menaechmus Twins by Plautus,” On-Stage Studies, 1994: 18-27. “Impulses Mirrored Darkly: Theatrical Images of Idealism in the Weimar Republic,” New England Theatre Journal I No. 1: (1989) 31–44. “Heinz Hilpert: The Revitalization of German Theatre After World War II,” Essays in Theatre Vol. 6 No. 2 (1988): 137–146. “Shakespeare in the Weimar Republic,” Theatre Survey XXVIII No. 2 (1987): 89–100. “Channing Pollock, The American Theatre’s Forgotten Polemicist,” Zeitschrift für Anglistik und Amerikanistik, Vol. 11 No. 2 (1987): 158–163.

Book chapters: “Offenbach’s Paradox and the Postwar German Theatre of the 1870s,” in Festschrift für Paul S. Ulrich, ed. Frank-Rüdiger Berger and Stephan Dörschel, Berlin: Akademie der Künste, 2024, 315–329. “Peter Stein,” in Great Directors, ed. Felicia Hardison Londré, London: Methuen 2019. “Ersatzkomödien verhatscht,” in Theater unter der NS-Herrschaft, ed. Veronika Zangl and Brigitte Dalinger, Göttingen: Vandenhoek und Ruprecht, 2019. “The Astonishing Career of Heinrich Conried,” Im Spiegel der Theatergeschichte ,Thalia Germanica Vol. 15, Ed. Paul S. Ulrich et al., Berlin: Hopf, 2015, 225–236. “The American Tours of Marie Geistinger, 1880-1907,” Polen und Europa : deutschsprachiges Theater in Polen und deutsches Minderheitentheater in Europa, Ed. Horst Fassel, et al. Lodz, Poland: University of Lodz Press, 2005, pp. 226–236. “Rules, Regulations, and the Reich,” Essays on Twentieth Century German Drama and Theatre, Ed. Helmuth Rennert, Frankfurt: Lang, 2004. pp. 196–201 “The Popular Repertory and the German-American Audience: the Pabst Theater in Milwaukee, 1885-1909,” Thalia Germanica Bern: Peter Lang, 2001, pp. 56–80. “Ordained Hands on the Altar of Art: Gründgens, Hilpert, and Fehling in Berlin,” The Theatre of the Third Reich, Ed. Glen Gadberry. New York: Greenwood, 1995: 75–89. “Choices of Evil: Brecht’s Modernism in the work with Eisler and Dessau,” Brecht Unbound, Ed. James A. Lyon and Hans-Peter Breuer. Newark, Del.: Univ. Delaware Press, 1995: 149–159.

=== Books ===
- Author, Cabaret (London, UK: Methuen, 2021). London, UK: Methuen, 2021. ISBN 9781350140257.
- Author, The Business of American Theatre, Oxford, UK: Routledge, 2020. ISBN 9780367460204.
- Author, Historical Dictionary of German Theater, Second Edition. Lanham, MD: Scarecrow Press, 2015. ISBN 9781442250192.
- Author, A Primer in Theatre History. Lanham, MD: University Press of America, 2013. ISBN 9780761860037.
- Author, Historical Dictionary of German Literature to 1945. Lanham, MD: Scarecrow Press, 2011. ISBN 9780810867710.
- Author, Historical Dictionary of Postwar German Literature. Lanham, MD: Scarecrow Press, 2009. ISBN 9780810859654
- Author, Cultural Chronicle of the Weimar Republic. Lanham, MD: Scarecrow Press, 2008. ISBN 9780810859678.
- Author, Historical Dictionary of German Theater. Lanham, MD: Scarecrow Press, 2006. ISBN 9780810853157.
- Author, Hitler Laughing: Comedy in the Third Reich. Lanham, MD: University Press of America, 2006.
- Author, Comedy in the Weimar Republic: A Chronicle of Incongruous Laughter. Westport, CT: Greenwood Press, 1996. ISBN 9780313299834.
- Author, Partnership in the German Theatre: Zuckmayer and Hilpert, 1925-1961. New York: P. Lang Pub, 1991. ISBN 9780820414058.
