= List of Austrian films of the 1920s =

A list of films produced in the Cinema of Austria in the 1920s ordered by year of release. For an alphabetical list of articles on Austrian films see Category:Austrian films.

== 1920 ==
Title	Director	Cast	Genre	Notes
Boccaccio	Michael Curtiz			
The Dancing Death	Jacob Fleck, Luise Fleck	Karl Ehmann, Liane Haid, Max Neufeld	Silent	
Doctor Ruhland	Max Neufeld	Liane Haid, Max Neufeld	Silent	Wiener Kunstfilm
Eva, The Sin	Jacob Fleck; Luise Fleck	Liane Haid; Max Neufeld	Drama	Wiener Kunstfilm
Der Feuertod; Burnt at the Stake	Dr. Franz Ferdinand			
Großstadtgift; Big City Poison	Jacob Fleck; Luise Fleck	Karl Ehmann; Dora Kaiser		Wiener Kunstfilm
Der Leiermann; The Organ-Grinder	Jacob Fleck; Luise Fleck	Liane Haid; Josef Bergauer		Wiener Kunstfilm
The Master of Life	Jacob Fleck, Luise Fleck	Liane Haid, Max Neufeld, Karl Ehmann	Drama	Wiener Kunstfilm
The Prince and the Pauper	Alexander Korda	Tibi Lubinsky, Franz Herterich	Historical	Sascha-Film
Die Gottesgeisel; The Scourge of God	Michael Curtiz	Lucy Doraine		
Der Stern von Damaskus; The Star of Damascus	Michael Curtiz	Lucy Doraine, Ivan Petrovich		

== 1921 ==
Title	Director	Cast	Genre	Notes
Die Festspiele 1921; The Festival of 1921		Alexander Moissi; Hedwig Bleibtreu; Werner Krauss	Documentary	Salzburger Kunstfilm
The Films of Princess Fantoche	Max Neufeld	Liane Haid, Hermann Benke	Silent	Vita-Film
Herzogin Satanella; Good and Evil	Michael Curtiz	Lucy Doraine, Alfons Fryland		
Das grinsende Gesicht	Julius Herzka	Franz Höbling, Nora Gregor, Lucienne Delacroix		
In Thrall to the Claw	Carl Froelich	Gustav Diessl, Eugen Jensen	Silent	
Kaiser Karl	Hans Otto Löwenstein	Josef Stätter; Grit Haid; Louise Seemann	Drama	Löwenstein Film
Labyrinth des Grauens; Labyrinth of Horror	Michael Curtiz	Lucy Doraine, Alfons Fryland	Drama	
Light of His Life	Max Neufeld	Liane Haid, Eugen Neufeld, Karl Ehmann	Silent	
Frau Dorothys Bekenntnis; Mrs. Dane's Confession	Michael Curtiz	Lucy Doraine, Alfons Fryland	Drama	
Mrs. Tutti Frutti	Michael Curtiz	Lucy Doraine, Alfons Fryland		
Theodor Herzl, der Bannerträger des jüdischen Volkes; Theodor Herzl, Vanguard of the Jewish People		Josef Schildkraut; Rudolf Schildkraut; Ernst Bath		
Um Haus und Hof; Around Home and Garden	Eduard Köck			Tiroler-Heimatfilm
The Woman in White	Max Neufeld	Liane Haid, Hermann Benke	Drama	Vita-Film

== 1922 ==
Title	Director	Cast	Genre	Notes
Confessions of a Monk	Friedrich Feher	Magda Sonja, Max Neufeld	Silent	
The Daughter of the Brigadier	Friedrich Porges	Grit Haid, Nora Gregor, Max Devrient	Silent	
The Dead Wedding Guest	Max Neufeld	Eugen Neufeld, Karl Ehmann, Carmen Cartellieri	Drama	Vita-Film
The Ghost of Morton's Castle	Hans Homma	Grit Haid, Egon von Jordan	Silent	
Gypsy Love	Thomas E. Walsh	Anny Ondra, Albert von Kersten	Silent	Sascha-Film
The House of Molitor	Hans Karl Breslauer	Alfred Abel, Anny Miletty	Silent	
Lead Us Not into Temptation	Sidney M. Goldin	Carl Lamac, Anny Ondra	Silent	
Look After Your Daughters	Sidney M. Goldin	Anny Ondra, Carl Lamac, Molly Picon	Comedy	
The Marquis of Bolibar	Friedrich Porges	Hans Schindler, Otto Schmöle	Silent	
The Marquise of Clermont	Hans Homma	Grit Haid, Egon Friedell	Silent	
Masters of the Sea	Alexander Korda	Victor Varconi, María Corda	Adventure	Sascha-Film
Meriota the Dancer	Julius Herska	Maria Mindzenty, Nora Gregor	Historical	
Oh, Dear Augustine	Hans Karl Breslauer	Willi Forst, Anny Miletty	Silent	
The Ragpicker of Paris	Hans Otto	Dora Kaiser, Franz Herterich, Olaf Fjord	Silent	
Samson and Delilah	Alexander Korda	María Corda, Paul Lukas	Epic	Vita-Film
The Separating Bridge	Julius Herska	Maria Mindzenty, Nora Gregor, Eugen Jensen	Silent	
Serge Panine	Maurice de Marsan, Charles Maudru	Albert von Kersten, Dora Kaiser	Silent	Sascha-Film. Co-production with France
Sodom and Gomorrah	Michael Curtiz	Walter Slezak, Victor Varconi, Lucy Doraine	Epic	Sascha-Film
A Vanished World	Alexander Korda	María Corda, Victor Varconi, Alberto Capozzi	Adventure	Sascha-Film
The Venus	Hans Homma	Raoul Aslan, Magda Sonja, Nora Gregor	Silent	
William Ratcliff	Heinz Hanus	Oscar Beregi, Hanna Ralph, Albert von Kersten	Silent	

== 1923 ==
Title	Director	Cast	Genre	Notes
Avalanche	Michael Curtiz	Victor Varconi, Mary Kid	Drama	Sascha-Film
The Blonde Geisha	Ludwig Czerny	Ferry Sikla, Ada Svedin	Silent	
Children of the Revolution	Hans Theyer	Oscar Beregi, Albert von Kersten	Silent	Sascha-Film
Fiat Lux	Wilhelm Thiele	Hella Moja, Carmen Cartellieri	Silent	
The Hell of Barballo	Hans Homma	Grit Haid, Albert von Kersten	Drama	
The Iron King	Max Neufeld	Siegmund Breitbart, Eugen Neufeld, Karl Ehmann	Silent	
Irrlichter der Tiefe; Will-o'-Wisps of the Deep	Fritz Freisler	Anita Berber; Nora Gregor		Freisler-Film
The Little Sin	Julius Herska	Nora Gregor, Hans Lackner	Silent	
Miss Madame	Hans Theyer	Albert von Kersten, Ica von Lenkeffy	Silent	Sascha-Film
Nameless	Michael Curtiz	Victor Varconi, Mary Kid, Karl Farkas	Drama	Sascha-Film
The Portrait	Jacques Feyder	Arlette Marchal, Malcolm Tod, Victor Vina	Drama	Co-production with France
The Slipper Hero	Reinhold Schünzel	Reinhold Schünzel, Liane Haid, Paul Hartmann	Comedy	Co-production with Germany
The Tales of Hoffmann	Max Neufeld	Max Neufeld, Karl Ehmann, Eugen Neufeld	Silent	Vita-Film
Tales of Old Vienna	Wilhelm Thiele	Grit Haid, Hans Thimig	Historical	
Tänze des Grauens, des Lasters und der Ekstase; Dances of Agony, Vice, and Ecstasy		Anita Berber; Fritz Freisler	Documentary	
The Three Marys	Reinhold Schünzel	Anita Berber, Lya De Putti	Silent	Co-production with Germany
Vienna, City of Song	Alfred Deutsch-German	Alice Hechy, Anita Berber	Silent	
Young Medardus	Michael Curtiz	Victor Varconi, Egon von Jordan, Agnes Esterhazy	Historical	Sascha-Film; based on a story by Arthur Schnitzler

== 1924 ==
Title	Director	Cast	Genre	Notes
The Curse	Robert Land	Lilian Harvey, Oscar Beregi	Drama	
Ein Spiel ums Leben; A Deadly Game	Michael Curtiz			
Everybody's Woman	Alexander Korda	Harry Nestor, May Hanbury	Drama	Sascha-Film
General Babka	Michael Curtiz			
Gulliver's Travels	Géza von Cziffra	Eugen Neufeld, Gyula Szöreghy	Adventure	
Orlacs Hände; The Hands of Orlac	Robert Wiene	Conrad Veidt; Fritz Kortner; Alexandra Sorina	Horror	Pan Film
Harun al Raschid	Michael Kertész	Adolf Weisse; Mary Kid		Sascha-Film
Modern Vices	Leopold Niernberger	Nora Gregor, Annemarie Steinsieck	Drama	
Pflicht und Ehre; Duty and Honour				
Die Sklavenkönigin; The Slave Queen, or The Moon of Israel	Michael Curtiz	María Corda; Oskar Beregi; Hans Marr		Sascha-Film; 70 minutes
Die Stadt ohne Juden; The City Without Jews	Hans Karl Breslauer	Johannes Riemann; Anna Milety; Hans Moser; Karl Thema	Drama	Walterskirchen und Bittner
Spring Awakening	Jacob Fleck; Luise Fleck	Frida Richard, Leopold von Ledebur, Erich Kaiser-Titz	Drama	
Die Tragödie des Carlo Pinetti; The Tragedy of Carlo Pinetti	Alphons Fryland			

== 1925 ==
Title	Director	Cast	Genre	Notes
Boarding House Groonen	Robert Wiene	Anton Edthofer, Karl Forest	Comedy	
Colonel Redl	Hans Otto	Robert Valberg, Eugen Neufeld	Drama	
Frauen aus der Wiener Vorstadt; Women of the Viennese Suburbs	Heinz Hanus	Paul Askonas; Carmen Cartellieri; Bertha Danegger	Drama	Hanus-Film
The Guardsman	Robert Wiene	Alfred Abel, María Corda	Comedy	
Leibfiaker Bratfisch; Coachman Bratfisch		Hans Otto Löwenstein		Geschichtsfilm concerns the suicide of Crown Prince Rudolf
The Revenge of the Pharaohs	Hans Theyer	Gustav Diessl, Suzy Vernon	Adventure	Sascha-Film
Salammbô	Pierre Marodon	Jeanne de Balzac; Rolla Norman; Adolf Weisse		Sascha-Film
Das Spielzeug von Paris; Red Heels (lit. Parisian Toy)	Michael Kertesz	Lili Damita; Hugo Thimig; Eric Barclay		Deutsche Film Gesellschaft; Sascha-Film
Wiener Bilderbogen Nr. 1	Luis Seel		animation	

== 1926 ==
Title	Director	Cast	Genre	Notes
The Arsonists of Europe	Max Neufeld	Charlotte Ander, Eugen Neufeld	Drama	
Cab No. 13; Fiaker Nr. 13	Michael Curtiz	Lili Damita, Jack Trevor	Drama	
The Golden Butterfly; Der goldene Schmetterling	Michael Curtiz	Hermann Leffler, Lili Damita, Nils Asther		
Her Highness Dances the Waltz	Fritz Freisler	Claire Rommer, Walter Rilla	Romance	
The Queen of Moulin Rouge	Robert Wiene	Mady Christians, André Roanne	Comedy	Pan Film
Der Rosenkavalier; The Cavalier of the Rose	Robert Wiene	Elly Felicie Berger; Michael Bohnen		Pan Film

== 1927 ==
Title	Director	Cast	Genre	Notes
Café Elektric	Gustav Ucicky	Marlene Dietrich; Willi Forst		Sascha-Film
The Family without Morals	Max Neufeld	Colette Brettel, Carmen Cartellieri, Paul Hartmann	Silent	
Der Geisterzug; Ghost Train	Géza von Bolváry			
Die Pratermizzi; Mizzi of the Prater	Eduard von Borsody; Karl Leiter; Gustav Ucicky	Anny Ondra; Nita Naldi; Igo Sym	Comedy	
The Right to Live	Robert Wohlmuth	Maly Delschaft, Erna Morena, Elizza La Porta	Drama	Co-production with Germany
Schweik in Civilian Life	Gustav Machatý	Karl Noll, Dina Gralla, Albert Paulig	Comedy	Co-production with Czechoslovakia
Vom Freudenhaus in die Ehe; From Bordello to Altar	Constantin David			
Sacco und Vanzetti; Sacco and Vanzetti	Alfréd Deésy	Paul Askonas; Louis V. Arco; Mizi Griebl	Drama	Gans-Film

== 1928 ==
Title	Director	Cast	Genre	Notes
Andere Frauen; Other Women	Heinz Hanus	Oskar Beregi; Vivian Gibson; Mizi Griebl	Drama	Otto Spitzer Film; Sascha-Film
Endangered Girls	Hans Otto	Max Landa, Cilly Feindt, Hermine Sterler	Drama	
Love in May	Robert Wohlmuth	Wolf Albach-Retty, Betty Astor, Igo Sym	Silent	
Marriage	Rudolf Walther-Fein	Fritz Kampers, Maria Paudler	Comedy	Co-production with Germany
Rich, Young and Beautiful	Fritz Freisler	Ernő Verebes, Igo Sym	Silent	
Das Schicksal derer von Habsburg; Fate of the Habsburgs	Rolf Raffé	Fritz Spira; Alfons Fryland; Franz Kammauf; Leni Riefenstahl		Essem-Film; Leo-Film
The White Sonata	Louis Seeman	Carla Bartheel, Vladimir Sokoloff	Drama	
The Woman of Yesterday and Tomorrow	Heinz Paul	Arlette Marchal, Vivian Gibson, Livio Pavanelli	Drama	

== 1929 ==
Title	Director	Cast	Genre	Notes
Das Annerl von Aussee; Annerl from Aussee	Josef Halbritter		Comedy	Halbritter-Film
Archduke John	Max Neufeld	Igo Sym, Xenia Desni	Historical	
Father Radetzky	Karl Leiter	Karl Forest, Otto Hartmann, Theodor Pistek	Historical	
G'schichten aus der Steiermark; Tales from Styria	Hans Otto Löwenstein			first Austrian sound film; premiere 23 August 1929 in Graz
The Midnight Waltz	Heinz Paul	Elisabeth Pinajeff, André Mattoni, Gritta Ley	Silent	
