= Cultural depictions of James II of England =

James II of England is a character in the novel The Man Who Laughs by Victor Hugo. James appears in Geoffrey Trease's 1947 novel, Trumpets in the West, which depicts him as a villain. He was portrayed by Josef Moser in the 1921 Austrian silent film Das grinsende Gesicht and by Sam De Grasse in the 1928 silent film The Man Who Laughs.

He has also been portrayed by Gibb McLaughlin in the 1926 silent film Nell Gwynne, based on a novel by Joseph Shearing, Lawrence Anderson in the 1934 film Nell Gwyn, Vernon Steele in the 1935 film Captain Blood, based on the novel by Rafael Sabatini, Douglas Matthews in the 1938 BBC TV drama Thank You, Mr. Pepys!, Henry Oscar in the 1948 film Bonnie Prince Charlie, John Westbrook in the 1969 BBC TV series The First Churchills, Guy Henry in the 1995 film England, My England, the story of the composer Henry Purcell, and Charlie Creed-Miles in the 2003 BBC TV miniseries Charles II: The Power & the Passion.

The squabbling surrounding James's kingship, the Monmouth Rebellion, the Glorious Revolution, James's abdication, and William of Orange's subsequent accession to the throne are themes in Neal Stephenson's 2003 novel Quicksilver.
