= The Man Who Laughs (1928 film) =

1928 film by Paul Leni

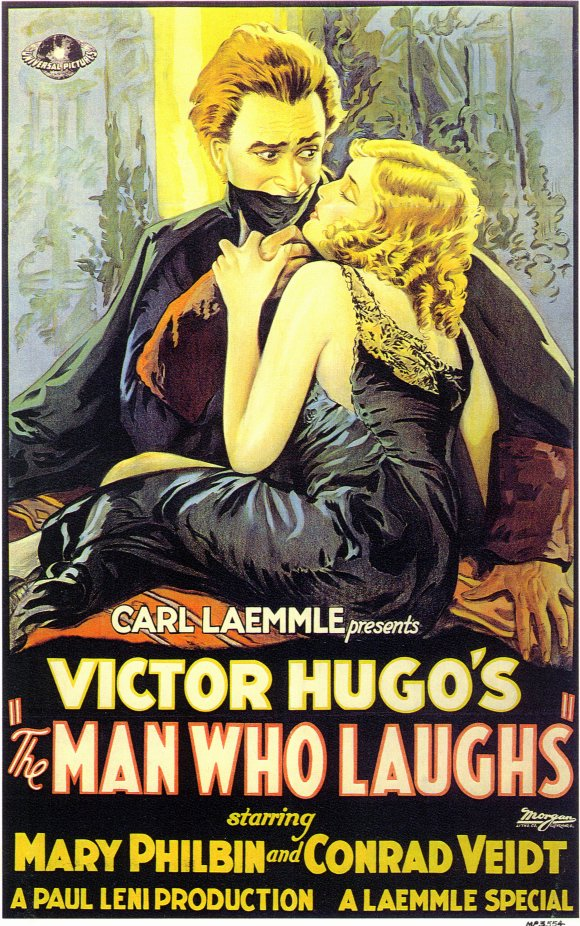
- Theatrical release poster
- Directed by: Paul Leni
- Screenplay by: J. Grubb Alexander; Walter Anthony; Mary McLean; Charles E. Whittaker
- Based on: The Man Who Laughs; 1869 novel by Victor Hugo
- Produced by: Carl Laemmle
- Starring: Mary Philbin; Conrad Veidt; Olga Baclanova; Brandon Hurst; Cesare Gravina; Stuart Holmes; Samuel de Grasse; George Siegmann; Josephine Crowell
- Cinematography: Gilbert Warrenton
- Edited by: Edward L. Cahn; Maurice Pivar
- Music by: Jeff Rapsis; Berklee College of Music
- Production company: Universal Pictures
- Distributed by: Universal Pictures
- Release dates: April 27, 1928 (NYC premiere); November 4, 1928
- Running time: 110 minutes (10 reels)
- Country: United States
- Language: English Intertitles

The Man Who Laughs is a 1928 American silent romantic drama film directed by the German Expressionist filmmaker Paul Leni. The film is an adaptation of Victor Hugo's 1869 novel of the same name, and stars Mary Philbin as the blind Dea and Conrad Veidt as Gwynplaine. The film is known for the grim carnival "freak-like" grin on the character Gwynplaine's face, which often leads it to be classified as a horror film. Film critic Roger Ebert stated "The Man Who Laughs is a melodrama, at times even a swashbuckler, but so steeped in expressionist gloom that it plays like a horror film."

The Man Who Laughs is a romantic melodrama similar to films such as The Hunchback of Notre Dame. The film was one of the earliest Universal Pictures films that made the transition from silent films to sound films using the Movietone sound system introduced by William Fox. While the film has no audible dialog, it was released with a synchronized musical score with sound effects using both sound-on-disc and sound-on-film processes. The film was completed in August 1927 but was set for general release as a "sound" film in October 1928 with sound effects and a musical score which included the song "When Love Comes Stealing".

The film entered the public domain in the United States in 2024.

== Plot ==
The Man Who Laughs

In late 17th-century England, court jester Barkilphedro informs King James II of the capture of Lord Clancharlie, an exiled nobleman, who has returned for his young son, Gwynplaine. The King tells Lord Clancharlie that a grin was carved upon the boy's face by Hardquanonne, a Comprachico surgeon. Lord Clancharlie is executed in an iron maiden.

Shortly afterward, the King issues a decree banishing all Comprachicos from England. A group of Comprachicos prepares to set sail from England, abandoning young Gwynplaine. The boy struggles through a snowstorm and rescues a baby girl whose mother had frozen to death. They are taken in by Ursus, a kindly philosopher-showman, and his pet wolf, Homo. Ursus realizes that the baby girl, named Dea, is blind.

Years later, Gwynplaine and Dea, now adults and in love, travel the countryside with Ursus, performing plays he has written for them. Gwynplaine's frozen smile has earned him widespread popularity as "The Laughing Man," but he is deeply ashamed of his disfigurement, believing himself unworthy of Dea's affections. Hardquanonne recognizes Gwynplaine at the Southwark Fair and sends a letter to the Duchess Josiana, which is intercepted by Barkilphedro, now an influential agent of the court. The letter claims knowledge of a living heir to the estates of Lord Clancharlie – currently being occupied by the Duchess – and suggests that she pay Hardquanonne for his silence. Barkilphedro shows the letter to Queen Anne, and his men take Hardquanonne to Chatham Prison to be tortured. The Queen sends the Duchess's fiancé, Lord Dirry-Moir, to retrieve her after she shirks her duties at the royal court. Dirry-Moir finds the Duchess shamelessly cavorting with the local men at the Southwark Fair. A brawl breaks out, and she leaves for Kensington Palace.

From a balcony, the Duchess watches Gwynplaine's act at the fair, and she finds herself both sexually aroused and repelled by his disfigurement. A messenger gives him a note arranging a rendezvous at midnight and, while conflicted over his feelings for Dea, he sneaks out of the caravan that night. His departure is heard by a worried and heartbroken Dea, who finds the letter. Gwynplaine is ushered inside the Duchess's estate, where she attempts to seduce him, but is interrupted by the delivery of a pronouncement informing her of Gwynplaine's noble lineage and the Queen's decree that she marry Gwynplaine, thereby legitimizing her occupation of the late Lord Clancharlie's estates, with her engagement to Dirry-Moir already having been annulled. The Duchess begins to laugh, causing Gwynplaine to rush away, devastated at again being made into a mockery.

Gwynplaine returns home and extracts the Duchess's letter clutched in Dea's hands as she sleeps. He tears the note into pieces before breaking down into tears, overcome by guilt. Dea wakes up, relieved to find he has returned. He guides her hands to feel his smile for the first time, and she reassures him that God made her sightless so she could see only the real Gwynplaine. Guards arrive to arrest Gwynplaine, and he is taken to Chatham Prison. When the guards later march out of the prison bearing Hardquanonne's coffin, Ursus mistakenly concludes that Gwynplaine has been executed. Barkilphedro arrives to notify Ursus he has been banished from England and cruelly lies to him that the "laughing mountebank" is dead. Hearing this from the stage, Dea faints in shock.

Gwynplaine is freed from prison and is to be made a peer in the House of Lords. The next day, he is brought to London for his introduction ceremony by Barkilphedro at the same time as Ursus and Dea head for the Thames docks to leave the country. Their vehicle carriage wheels lock and Ursus's pet wolf, Homo, leads Dea to the House of Lords. The peers are outraged that somebody whom they believe to be a clown has joined their ranks. Gwynplaine is presented to Queen Anne, who decrees Gwynplaine will marry the Duchess. Dirry-Moir brings Dea inside the building, but she is tricked into going back outside by Barkilphedro and brought to Ursus. Upset over the peers' mockery, Gwynplaine renounces his peerage and refuses to marry the Duchess. He escapes from the guards and runs through the streets, only to find his show closed. Gwynplaine heads to the docks when he learns that Dea and Ursus were ordered to leave England, managing to elude Barkilphedro's men with the help of the villagers. When he reaches the docks, Gwynplaine's cries are heard by Homo, who leaps off the ship and swims to him. The wolf-dog mauls Barkilphedro who was about to attack Gwynplaine. Gwynplaine and Homo are pulled aboard, where the former is reunited with Ursus and Dea; together, they sail away.

== Cast ==
=== Main ===
- Mary Philbin as Dea: A delicate, beautiful, blind young woman whom Gwynplaine rescues from the freezing arms of her dead mother when they are both children. Because of her blindness, she is completely unaware of Gwynplaine's mutilated face and loves him purely for his gentle soul.
- Conrad Veidt as Gwynplaine: A noble-born heir who is sold to the Comprachicos as a young boy and surgically disfigured to wear a permanent, grotesque grin by order of King James II. He grows up to become a famous, tragic traveling clown known as "The Laughing Man" who is deeply ashamed of his appearance, despite the pure love he shares with Dea.
  - Veidt also portrays Lord Clancharlie, Gwynplaine's father
    - Julius Molnar Jr. as young Gwynplaine
- Olga Baclanova as Duchess Josiana, A wealthy, decadent aristocrat and the sister of Queen Anne. She becomes erotically fascinated by Gwynplaine's disfigurement and attempts to seduce him, treating him as an amusing freak to alleviate her boredom.
- Brandon Hurst as Barkilphedro: A scheming and malicious court jester whose machinations drive much of the plot. He discovers Gwynplaine's true aristocratic lineage and uses this information to manipulate the royal court for his own cruel amusement.
- Cesare Gravina as Ursus: A cynical but kind-hearted mountebank and philosopher who takes in the orphaned Gwynplaine and Dea, raising them as his own children and building a successful traveling theatrical troupe around their talents.
- Stuart Holmes as Lord Dirry-Moir: An eccentric aristocratic nobleman and the betrothed of Duchess Josiana. He frequently visits the traveling shows and inadvertently becomes entangled in the court's schemes surrounding Gwynplaine's restoration to the peerage.
- Sam De Grasse as King James II: The tyrannical, cruel King of England who executes Gwynplaine's rebellious father and orders the young boy's horrific disfigurement as a twisted, lingering punishment.
- George Siegmann as Dr. Hardquanonne: The sinister Comprachico surgeon responsible for carving the permanent smile onto Gwynplaine's face. His later recognition of the adult Gwynplaine sets off the chain of events that exposes the clown's true identity.
- Josephine Crowell as Queen Anne: The reigning monarch of England during Gwynplaine's adulthood, who attempts to use his restored nobility as a pawn to humiliate her sister, Josiana, by ordering them to marry.
- Charles Puffy as the Innkeeper: A jovial, heavyset proprietor of the Southwark inn where Ursus's traveling theatrical troupe lodges. He provides a touch of comic relief while dealing with the massive, rowdy crowds of patrons who flock to his establishment to see the famous "Laughing Man" perform.
- Zimbo the Dog as Homo the Wolf: Ursus's fiercely loyal wolfdog, who travels with the theatrical troupe and acts as a protector for Gwynplaine, Dea, and Ursus.

=== Uncredited ===
- Tom Amandares as Shouting Man
- Carmen Castillo as Dea's Mother
- Carrie Daumery as Lady-in-Waiting
- Nick De Ruiz as Wapentake
- Louise Emmons as the Gypsy Hag
- John George as a Dwarf
- Frank Puglia & Jack A. Goodrich as Clowns
- Alexander P. Linton as a Sideshow: Sword Swallower
- George Marion as Man at Chatham Prison
- Torben Meyer as the Spy
- Joe Murphy as Hardquanonne's Messenger
- Edgar Norton as Lord High Chancellor
- Lon Poff as Townsman

=== Unknown roles ===
Henry A. Barrows, Richard Bartlett, Les Bates, Charles Brinley, Allan Cavan, D'Arcy Corrigan, Howard Davies, J.C. Fowler, Charles Hancock, Lila LaPon, Broderick O'Farrell, Henry Roquemore, Templar Saxe, Allan Sears, Scott Seaton, Louis Stern, Al Stewart and Anton Vaverka.

== Theme song ==
The film featured a theme song entitled "When Love Comes Stealing", composed by Ernö Rapée with lyrics by Walter Hirsch and Lew Pollack.

The song had been originally recorded acoustically by tenor Lewis James on 4 March 1924 as Victor 19326-A. The song achieved a resurgence of popularity in early 1928, due to the popularity of film theme songs with the public. Because of the success of Rapée and Pollack's theme songs "Charmaine" and "Diane" for the films What Price Glory? and 7th Heaven. Several electrical recordings of "When Love Comes Stealing" appeared between February and October on Edison, Victor, Columbia, and Brunswick, including versions by Bob Haring (Regent Club Orchestra), Nathaniel Shilkret (The Troubadours), Joe Green (Dixie Marimba Players) and other orchestras (e.g., Jack Stillman, Herman Kenin, Jimmy McHugh). Vocal records also appeared, including those by tenors James Melton and Harold Scrappy Lambert.

== Production ==
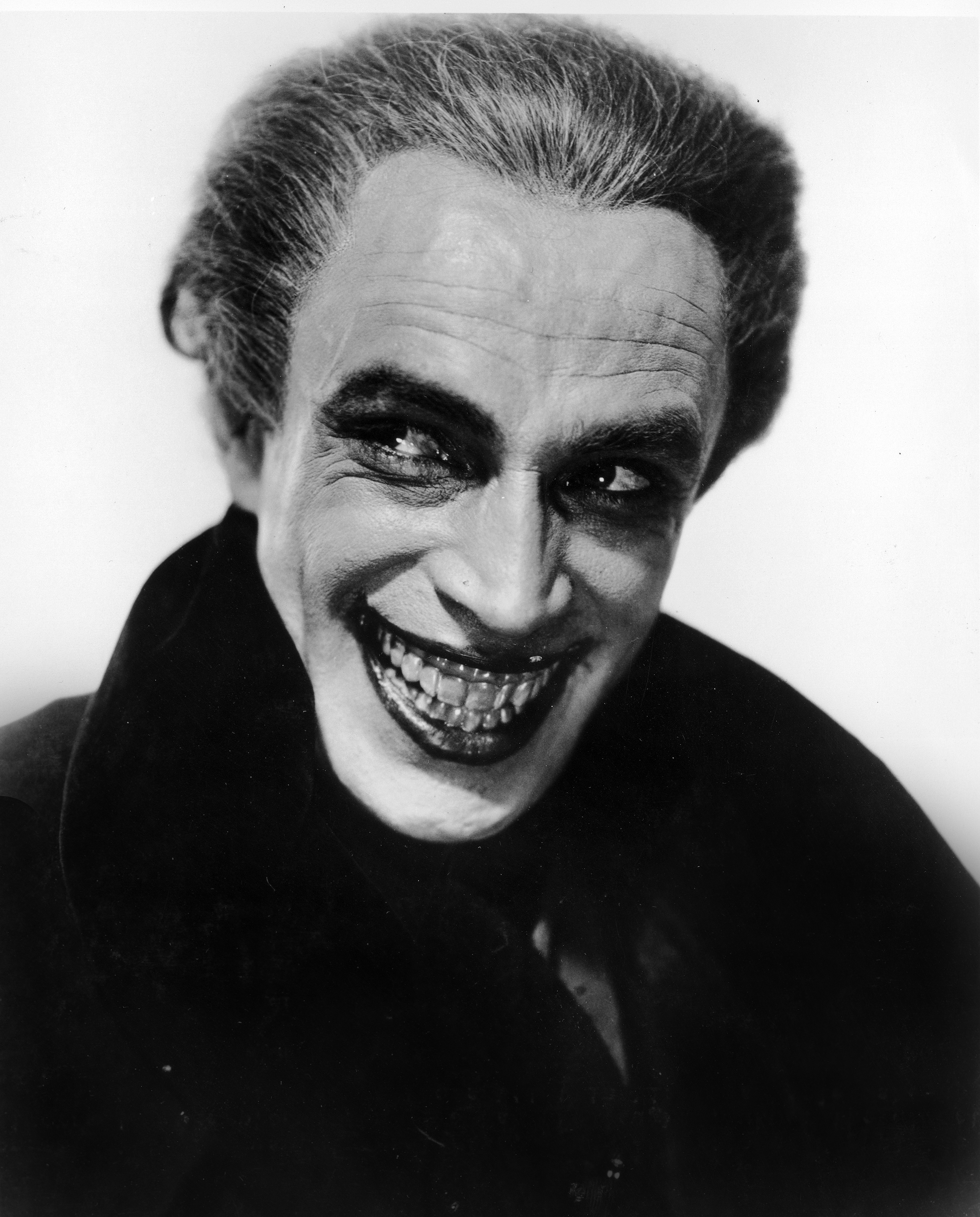
Conrad Veidt as Gwynplaine

Following the success of Universal Pictures's 1923 adaptation of Victor Hugo's The Hunchback of Notre-Dame, the company was eager to release another film starring Lon Chaney. A treatment adapting The Phantom of the Opera was prepared, but rejected by the Universal executives. In its place, Chaney was offered the lead in a film version of Hugo's The Man Who Laughs, to be produced under its French title (L'Homme Qui Rit) out of perceived similarity to Les Misérables. The Man Who Laughs, published in 1869, had been subject to significant criticism in both England and France, and was one of Hugo's least successful novels, but it had been filmed twice before. Pathé had produced L'Homme qui rit in France in 1908, and the Austrian film company Olympic-Film released a low-budget German version in 1921 as Das grinsende Gesicht.

Despite Chaney's contract, production did not begin. Universal had failed to acquire film rights to the Hugo novel from the French studio Société Générale des Films. Chaney's contract was amended, releasing him from The Man Who Laughs, but permitting him to name the replacement film, ultimately resulting in the 1925 The Phantom of the Opera. After the success of Phantom, studio chief Carl Laemmle returned to The Man Who Laughs for Universal's next Gothic film "super-production". Laemmle selected two fellow expatriate Germans for the project. Director Paul Leni had been hired by Universal following his internationally acclaimed Waxworks, and had already proven himself to the company with The Cat and the Canary. Countryman Conrad Veidt was cast in the Gwynplaine role that was previously intended for Chaney. Veidt had worked with Leni for Waxworks and several other German films, and was well known for his role as Cesare in The Cabinet of Dr. Caligari. American actress Mary Philbin, who had played Christine Daaé opposite Chaney in Phantom, was cast as Dea.

Leni was provided with a skilled crew. Charles D. Hall was chosen to design the sets. He had previously adapted Ben Carré's stage sets to film for Phantom and had worked with Leni for The Cat and the Canary. Jack Pierce became the head makeup artist at Universal in 1926, and was responsible for crafting Gwynplaine's appearance.

During the sequence where Gwynplaine is presented to the House of Lords, the extras were so moved by Veidt's performance that they burst into applause.

Universal put over $1,000,000 into The Man Who Laughs.

=== Music and sound ===
Like many other films from late 1927 and early 1928, The Man Who Laughs was given a first run at a limited amount of theatres as a silent film. The phenomenal success of 1927's The Jazz Singer, the first commercially successful sound film, heralded the demise of the silent era. By May the next year, virtually every Hollywood studio was licensed by Western Electric's newly created marketing subsidiary, Electrical Research Products, Incorporated, to use Western Electric equipment with the Movietone sound-on-film recording system. Technologically superior to the Vitaphone sound-on-disc system used by The Jazz Singer, Movietone enabled image and sound to be recorded simultaneously in the same (photographic) medium, ensuring their precise and automatic synchronization.

Universal used Movietone to provide The Man Who Laughs with an orchestral score in November 1928 that included occasional synchronized sounds including bells, knocks, and trumpets.

== Release ==
=== Theatrical release ===
The Man Who Laughs opened on April 27, 1928, at New York's Central Theatre. Proceeds from the opening night were donated to the non-profit organization American Friends of Blérancourt. The film was released in the United States on November 4, 1928.

The Man Who Laughs received two releases in the United Kingdom. The film originally released in London on May 16, 1928, completely silent, with a score provided by each theater's resident musicians. Universal later used the Movietone sound-on-film process to give the film a synchronized musical score, which released in London on November 30, 1928.

=== Home media ===
For many years, the film was not publicly available. In the 1960s, The Man Who Laughs was among the films preserved by the Library of Congress following a donation from the American Film Institute; along with 22 other such films, it was shown at the New York Film Festival in 1969. It was again screened by Peter Bogdanovich at the Telluride Film Festival in 1998, but remained largely unavailable until Kino International and the Cineteca di Bologna produced a restored version of the film made from two American prints and an Italian print. This restoration was released on DVD by Kino on November 16, 2007. Slant Magazine gave this DVD 3.5 out of 5 stars, citing the overall quality of the restoration and the uniqueness of the included extras, including a home movie of Veidt. Kino included this DVD in their five-volume American Silent Horror Collection box set on October 9, 2007. Sunrise Silents also produced a DVD of the film, edited to a slightly longer runtime than the Kino restoration, released in October 2008.

The Man Who Laughs was released on Blu-ray and DVD on June 4, 2019, sourced from a new 4K restoration, and features the original score performed by The Berklee College of Music Silent Film Orchestra. The film was also restored on August 17, 2020, by Masters of Cinema.

== Critical reception ==
=== Contemporary ===
Initially, the critical assessment of The Man Who Laughs judged the film mediocre, with some critics disliking the morbidity of the subject matter and others complaining that the German-looking sets did not evoke 17th-century England.

Paul Rotha was particularly critical. In his 1930 book on the history of film, The Film Till Now, he called The Man Who Laughs a "travesty of cinematic methods", and declared that in directing it, Leni "became slack, drivelling, slovenly, and lost all sense of decoration, cinema, and artistry". The New York Times gave the film a slightly positive review, calling it "gruesome but interesting, and one of the few samples of pictorial work in which there is no handsome leading man".

=== Modern ===
The Man Who Laughs has received critical acclaim from modern critics as an influential German Expressionist film made during the height of the silent era. Roger Ebert placed The Man Who Laughs on his Great Movies list, giving it four out of four stars and declaring the film to be "one of the final treasures of German silent Expressionism", commending Leni's "mastery of visual style". Kevin Thomas from the Los Angeles Times gave the film a glowing review, describing it as "precisely the kind of all-stops-out romantic adventure that needs the silent rather than sound medium for maximum impact", and calling Leni "its perfect director, for his bravura Expressionist style lifts this tempestuous tale above the level of tear-jerker to genuinely stirring experience". Slant Magazine's Eric Henderson gave the film three-and-a-half out of four stars, writing that The Man Who Laughs took Universal's series of Gothic horror films to "new and unparalleled heights in cinematic intelligence". Henderson noted the film's "obsessive dualism", citing its "fascination with bric-a-brac and its tendency towards spare, minimalist compositions" as "evidence of a stylistic schism". Time Out's Bob Baker called the film "a riot of Expressionist detail in Leni's forceful handling" anchored by Veidt's "sensitive rendering" of Gwynplaine. Baker credits Leni's "pictorial genius" as marking the film as "one of the most exhilarating of late silent cinema". Comparing the film to Leni's directorial effort from the previous year, The Cat and the Canary, the Chicago Reader's J. R. Jones found that The Man Who Laughs better demonstrates the director's "considerable dramatic and pictorial talents", with the love between Gwynplaine and Dea yielding "a sincere and extravagant sense of romance". Writing for Little White Lies, Anton Bitel describes the film as never reaching the same horror as Leni's other features, Waxworks and The Cat and the Canary, despite its sometimes grisly subject matter, likening it to "a sentimental romance and a political satire, with just a smidgin of rooftop swashbuckling thrown in near the end". He praised Veidt's ability to portray a full emotional range without being able to move "one of the face's most expressive parts" and called the theatricality and transgression of social norms within the film "carnivalesque", embodied most completely by Gwynplaine, "a man who is his mask".

On review aggregator Rotten Tomatoes, the film has a perfect 100% approval rate based on 23 reviews, with a weighted average rating of 8.4/10. The site's critical consensus reads, "A meeting of brilliant creative minds, The Man Who Laughs serves as a stellar showcase for the talents of director Paul Leni and star Conrad Veidt."

== Legacy ==
The Man Who Laughs had considerable influence on the later Universal Classic Monsters films. Pierce continued to provide the makeup for Universal's monsters; comparisons to Gwynplaine's grin were used to advertise The Raven. Hall's set design for The Man Who Laughs helped him develop the blend of Gothic and expressionist features he employed for some of the most important Universal horror films of the 1930s: Dracula, Frankenstein, The Old Dark House, The Invisible Man, The Black Cat, and Bride of Frankenstein. Decades later, the themes and style of The Man Who Laughs were influences on Brian De Palma's 2006 The Black Dahlia, which incorporates some footage from the 1928 film.

The Joker's distinctive grin, seen here in art by Alex Ross, was inspired by Veidt's role as Gwynplaine

The Joker, nemesis to DC Comics's Batman, owes his appearance to Veidt's portrayal of Gwynplaine in the film. Although Bill Finger, Bob Kane, and Jerry Robinson disagreed as to their respective roles in the 1940 creation of the Joker, they agreed that his exaggerated smile was influenced by a photograph of Veidt from the film. A 2005 graphic novel exploring the first encounter between Batman and the Joker was also titled Batman: The Man Who Laughs in homage to the 1928 film, as was The Batman Who Laughs, an alternate universe Batman who becomes more like Joker after managing to kill his enemy. In the Justice League episode, "Wild Cards", the Joker runs a TV production company called Gwynplaine Entertainment Company, after the character.

=== Later adaptations ===
Although prominent actors, including Christopher Lee and Kirk Douglas, expressed interest in taking the role of Gwynplaine in a hypothetical remake, there has been no American film adaptation of The Man Who Laughs in the sound era; however, there have been three adaptations by European directors. Italian director Sergio Corbucci's 1966 version, L'Uomo che ride (released in the United States as The Man Who Laughs, but in France as L'Imposture des Borgia) substantially altered the plot and setting, placing the events in Italy and replacing the court of King James II with that of the House of Borgia. Jean Kerchbron directed a three-part French television film adaptation, L'Homme qui rit, in 1971. Philippe Bouclet and Delphine Desyeux star as Gwynplaine and Dea; Philippe Clay appeared as Barkilphedro. Jean-Pierre Améris directed another French-language version, also called L'Homme qui rit, which was released in 2012. It stars Marc-André Grondin and Christa Théret, with Gérard Depardieu as Ursus.

Horror-film historian Wheeler Winston Dixon described the 1961 film Mr. Sardonicus, also featuring a character with a horrifying grin, as "The Man Who Laughs ... remade, after a fashion". However, its director, William Castle, has stated the film is an adaptation of "Sardonicus", an unrelated short story by Ray Russell originally appearing in Playboy.

== See also ==
- List of early sound feature films (1926–1929)

== Bibliography ==
- Altman, Rick (2007). Silent Film Sound. Film and Culture. Columbia University Press. ISBN 978-0-231-11663-3.
- Castle, William (1992) [1976]. Step Right Up! I'm Gonna Scare the Pants Off America: Memoirs of a B-Movie Mogul. Putnam. ISBN 978-0-88687-657-9.
- Conrich, Ian (2004). "Before Sound: Universal, Silent Cinema, and the Last of the Horror-Spectaculars". In Prince, Stephen (ed.). The Horror Film. Rutgers University Press. pp. 40–57. ISBN 978-0-8135-3363-6.
- DiLeo, John (2007). Screen Savers: 40 Remarkable Movies Awaiting Rediscovery. Hansen. ISBN 978-1-60182-654-1.
- Dixon, Wheeler Winston (2010). A History of Horror. Rutgers University Press. ISBN 978-0-8135-4795-4.
- Gleizes, Delphine, ed. (2005). L'œuvre de Victor Hugo à l'écran (in French). L'Harmattan. ISBN 978-2-7475-9094-5.
- Holston, Kim R. (2013). Movie Roadshows: A History and Filmography of Reserved-Seat Limited Showings, 1911–1973. McFarland. ISBN 978-0-7864-6062-5.
- Josephson, Matthew (2005) [1942]. Victor Hugo: A Realistic Biography of the Great Romantic. Jorge Pinto Books. ISBN 978-0-9742615-7-7.
- Long, Harry H (2012). "The Man Who Laughs". In Soister, John T.; Nicolella, Henry; Joyce, Stever; Long, Harry H; Chase, Bill (eds.). American Silent Horror, Science Fiction and Fantasy Feature Films, 1913–1929. McFarland. pp. 374–378. ISBN 978-0-7864-3581-4.
- Mank, Gregory William (2009) [1990]. Bela Lugosi and Boris Karloff: The Expanded Story of a Haunting Collaboration, with a Complete Filmography of Their Films Together (revised ed.). McFarland. ISBN 978-0-7864-3480-0.
- Melnick, Ross (2012). American Showman: Samuel 'Roxy' Rothafel and the Birth of the Entertainment Industry, 1908–1935. Columbia University Press. ISBN 978-0-231-15904-3.
- Richards, Rashna Wadia (2013). Cinematic Flashes: Cinephilia and Classical Hollywood. Indiana University Press. ISBN 978-0-253-00688-2.
- Riley, Philip J. (1996). The Phantom of the Opera. Hollywood Archives Series. Magicimage Filmbooks. ISBN 978-1-882127-33-7.
- Rotha, Paul (1930). The Film Till Now: A Survey of the Cinema. Jonathan Cape. OCLC 886633324.
- Slowik, Michael (2014). After the Silents: Hollywood Film Music in the Early Sound Era, 1926–1934. Columbia University Press. ISBN 978-0-231-16582-2.
- Soister, John T. (2002). Conrad Veidt on Screen: A Comprehensive Illustrated Filmography. McFarland. ISBN 978-0-7864-4511-0.
- Solomon, Matthew (2013). "Laughing Silently". In Pomerance, Murray (ed.). The Last Laugh: Strange Humors of Cinema. Wayne State University Press. pp. 15–30. ISBN 978-0-8143-3513-0.
- Stephens, Michael L. (1998). Art Directors in Cinema: A Worldwide Biographical Dictionary. McFarland. ISBN 978-0-7864-3771-9.
