= The Man Who Laughs =

Novel by Victor Hugo

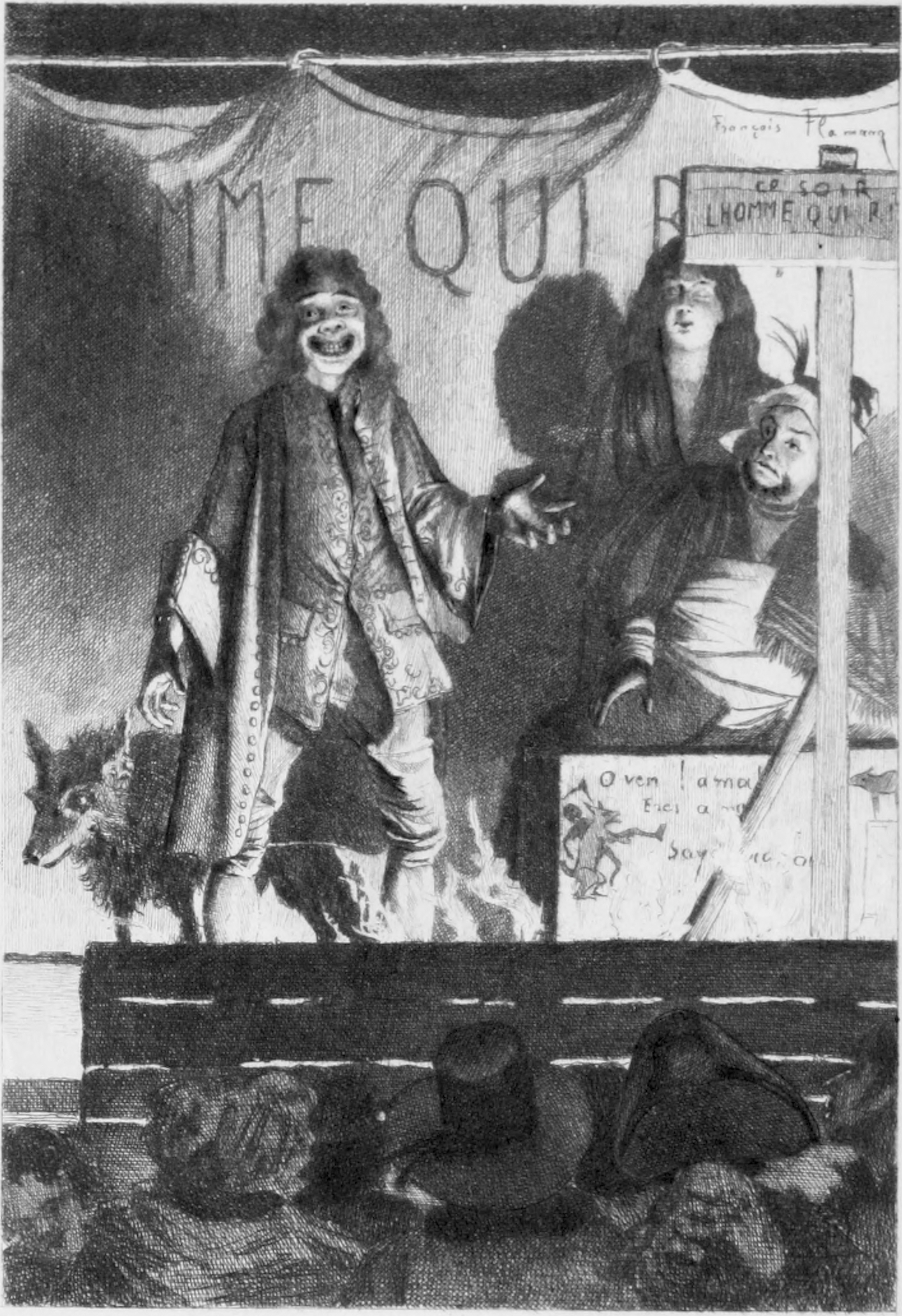
- "At the Green Box", frontispiece to volume II of the 1869 English translation
- Author: Victor Hugo
- Original title: L'Homme qui rit
- Language: French
- Published: April 1869; A. Lacroix, Verboeckhoven & Ce
- Publication place: France
- Media type: Print (Hardcover and Paperback)
- Pages: 386
- OCLC: 49383068

The Man Who Laughs (also published under the title By Order of the King from its subtitle in French) is a philosophical and dramatic romance novel by Victor Hugo, originally published in April 1869 under the French title L'Homme qui rit. It takes place in England beginning in 1690 and extends into the early 18th-century reign of Queen Anne. It depicts England's royalty and aristocracy of the time as cruel and power-hungry. Hugo intended parallels with the France of Louis-Philippe and the Régence.

The novel follows the life of a young nobleman who was disfigured as a child on the orders of the king. Exiled and renamed "Gwynplaine", he travels with his protector and companion, the vagabond philosopher Ursus, and Dea, who he rescued as a baby during a storm. The novel is famous for Gwynplaine's mutilated face, stuck in a permanent grin. The book has inspired many artists, dramatists, and filmmakers.

== Background ==
Hugo wrote The Man Who Laughs over a period of 15 months while he was living in the Channel Islands, having been exiled from his native France after opposing the regime of Napoleon III. The title comes from verses in the author's Le Roi s’amuse (1832) where the jester Triboulet says, comparing his fate with that of an executioner « Je suis l’homme qui rit, il est l’homme qui tue » - "I am the man who laughs, he is the man who kills". Despite an initially negative reception upon publication, The Man Who Laughs is considered one of Hugo's greatest works.

In his speech to the Lords, Gwynplaine asserts:

Je suis un symbole. Ô tout-puissants imbéciles que vous êtes, ouvrez les yeux. J’incarne Tout. Je représente l’humanité telle que ses maîtres l’ont faite.

I am a symbol. Oh, you all-powerful fools, open your eyes. I represent all. I embody humanity as its masters have made it.

— Gwynplaine, in Part 2, Book 8, Chapter VII

Making a parallel between the mutilation of one man and of human experience, Hugo touches on a recurrent theme in his work "la misère", and criticizes both the nobility which in boredom resorts to violence and oppression and the passivity of the people, who submit to it and prefer laughter to struggle.

In an unpublished note Hugo explained that the subject of the book is philosophical, not historical. "If this book relates to something, it is to the eternal nature of man, and not the transient. The action, no doubt, and this is the law of drama as it is the law of life, takes place in a country and in a time, but it takes place above all in the human soul. The reflection of a particular page of history which enlightens us all sets the location, but does not confine us within it. The infinity of the heart is not from any century. Man is not dated." In another shorter essay in his preface he said simply: "I felt the need to affirm the soul".

A few of Hugo's drawings can be linked with the book and its themes. For instance, the lighthouses of Eddystone and the Casquets in Book II, Chapter XI in the first part, where the author contrasts three types of beacon or lighthouse ('Le phare des Casquets' and 'Le phare d'Eddystone' – both 1866. Hugo also drew 'Le Lever ou la Duchesse Josiane' in quill and brown ink, for Book VII, Chapter IV (Satan) in part 2.

== Plot summary ==
The novel is divided into two parts: La mer et la nuit (The sea and the night) and Par ordre du roi (On the king's command).

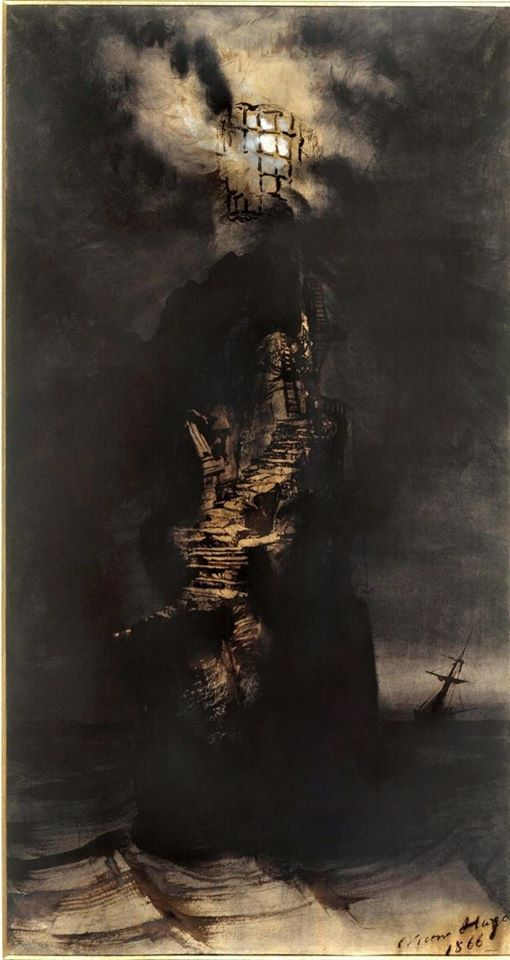
Le phare des Casquets (Hugo) 1866

In late 17th-century England, a homeless boy named Gwynplaine rescues an infant girl during a snowstorm, her mother having frozen to death. They meet an itinerant carnival vendor who calls himself Ursus, and his pet wolf, Homo (whose name is a pun on the Latin saying "Homo homini lupus"). Gwynplaine's mouth has been mutilated into a perpetual grin; Ursus is initially horrified, then moved to pity, and he takes them in. 15 years later, Gwynplaine has grown into a strong young man, attractive except for his distorted visage. The girl, now named Dea, is blind, and has grown into a beautiful and innocent young woman. By touching his face, Dea concludes that Gwynplaine is perpetually happy. They fall in love. Ursus and his surrogate children earn a meagre living in the fairs of southern England. Gwynplaine keeps the lower half of his face concealed. In each town, Gwynplaine gives a stage performance in which the crowds are provoked to laughter when Gwynplaine reveals his grotesque face.

The spoiled and jaded Duchess Josiana, the illegitimate daughter of King James II, is bored by the dull routine of court. Her fiancé, David Dirry-Moir, to whom she has been engaged since infancy, tells Josiana that the only cure for her boredom is Gwynplaine. She attends one of Gwynplaine's performances, and is aroused by the combination of his virile grace and his facial deformity. Gwynplaine is aroused by Josiana's physical beauty and haughty demeanor. Later, an agent of the royal court, Barkilphedro, who wishes to humiliate and destroy Josiana by compelling her to marry the 'clown' Gwynplaine, arrives at the caravan and compels Gwynplaine to follow him. Gwynplaine is ushered to a dungeon in London, where a physician named Hardquannone is being tortured to death. Hardquannone recognizes Gwynplaine, and identifies him as the boy whose abduction and disfigurement Hardquannone arranged 23 years earlier. A flashback relates the doctor's story.

During the reign of the despotic King James II, in 1685–1688, one of the King's enemies was Lord Linnaeus Clancharlie, Marquis of Corleone, who had fled to Switzerland. Upon the lord's death, the King arranged the abduction of his two-year-old son and legitimate heir, Fermain. The King sold Fermain to a band of wanderers called "Comprachicos", criminals who mutilate and disfigure children, and then force them to beg for alms or be exhibited as carnival freaks.

Confirming the story is a message in a bottle recently brought to Queen Anne. The message is the final confession from the Comprachicos, written in the certainty that their ship was about to founder in a storm. It explains how they renamed the boy "Gwynplaine", and abandoned him in a snowstorm before setting to sea. David Dirry-Moir is the illegitimate son of Lord Linnaeus. Now that Fermain is known to be alive, the inheritance promised to David on the condition of his marriage to Josiana will instead go to Fermain.

Gwynplaine is arrested and Barkilphedro lies to Ursus that Gwynplaine is dead. The frail Dea becomes ill with grief. The authorities condemn them to exile for illegally using a wolf in their shows.

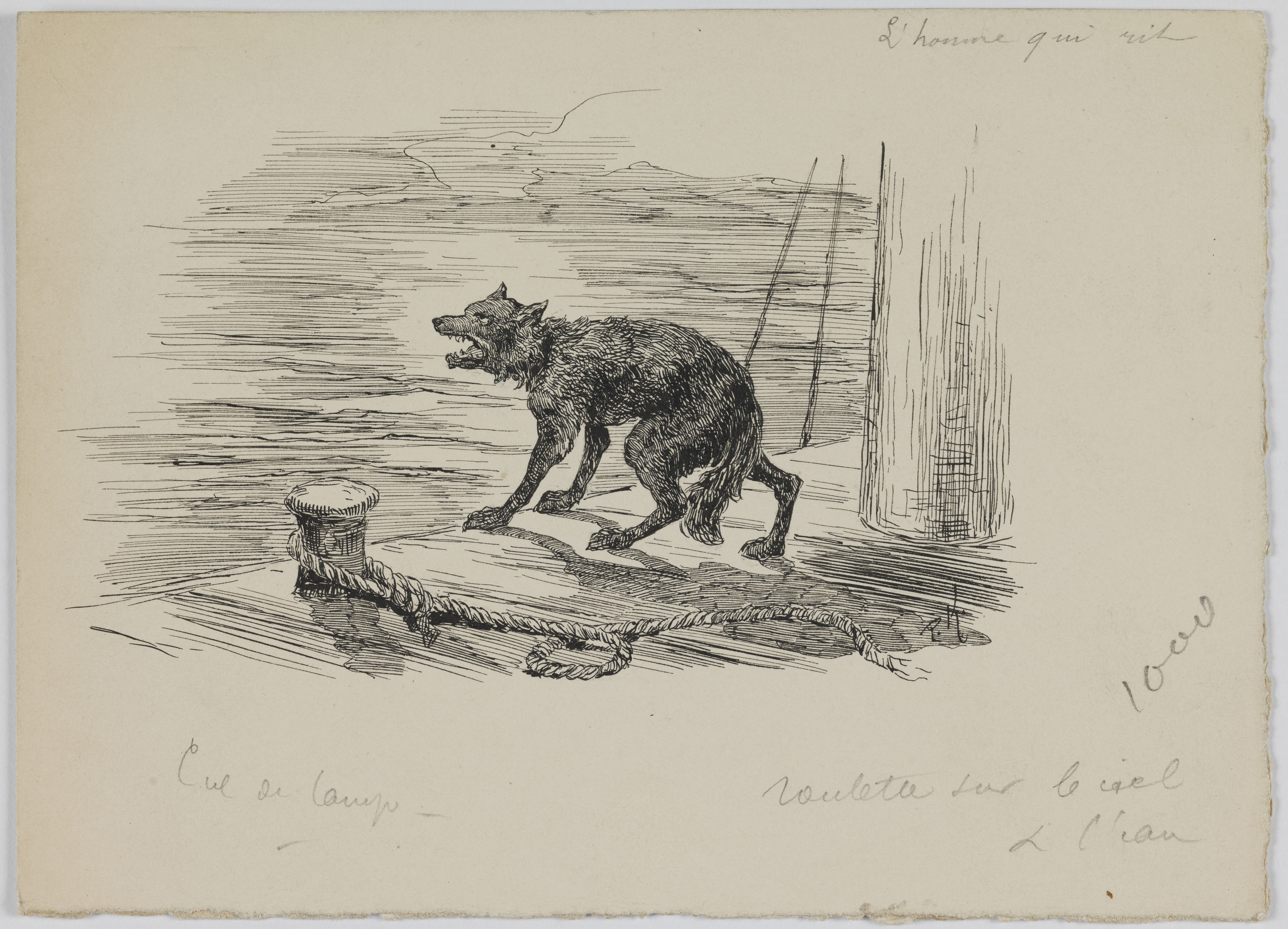
Homo howling at death - tail-piece for "Le Livre d'or de Victor Hugo" by Paul Adolphe Kauffmann

Josiana has Gwynplaine secretly brought to her so that she may seduce him. She is interrupted by the delivery of a pronouncement from the Queen, informing Josiana that David has been disinherited, and the Duchess is now commanded to marry Gwynplaine. Josiana rejects Gwynplaine as a lover, but dutifully agrees to marry him.

Gwynplaine is instated as Lord Fermain Clancharlie, Marquis of Corleone, and permitted to sit in the House of Lords. When he addresses the peerage with a fiery speech against the gross inequality of the age, the other lords are provoked to laughter by Gwynplaine's clownish grin. David defends him and challenges a dozen Lords to duels, but he also challenges Gwynplaine whose speech had inadvertently condemned David's mother, who abandoned David's father to become the mistress of Charles II.

Gwynplaine renounces his peerage and travels to find Ursus and Dea. He is nearly driven to suicide when he is unable to find them. Learning that they are to be deported, he locates their ship and reunites with them. Dea is ecstatic, but abruptly dies due to complications brought on by an already weak heart and her loss of Gwynplaine. Ursus faints. Gwynplaine, as though in a trance, walks across the deck while speaking to the dead Dea, and throws himself overboard. When Ursus recovers, he finds Homo sitting at the ship's rail, howling at the sea.

== Criticism ==
Hugo's romantic novel The Man Who Laughs places its narrative in 17th-century England, where the relationships between the bourgeoisie and the aristocracy are complicated by continual distancing from the lower class. According to Algernon Charles Swinburne, "it is a book to be rightly read, not by the lamplight of realism, but by the sunlight of his imagination reflected upon ours." Hugo's protagonist, Gwynplaine (a physically transgressive figure, something of a monster), transgresses these societal spheres by being reinstated from the lower class into the aristocracy—a movement which enabled Hugo to critique construction of social identity based upon class status. Stallybrass and White's "The Sewer, the Gaze and the Contaminating Touch" addresses several of the class theories regarding narrative figures transgressing class boundaries. Gwynplaine specifically can be seen to be the supreme embodiment of Stallybrass and White's "rat" analysis, meaning Hugo's protagonist is, in essence, a sliding signifier.

== Adaptations ==
=== Film ===
Film adaptations of The Man Who Laughs include:

- The Man Who Laughs (1909 film), made in France by the Pathé film company and produced by Albert Capellani. No copies of this film are known to survive.
- Das grinsende Gesicht (1921) (transl. The Grinning Face) an Austrian silent film produced by Olympic Films, directed by Julius Herzka, with Franz Höbling in the leading role as Gwynplaine. This low-budget film is faithful to the novel, but simplifies and condenses the plot.
- The Man Who Laughs (1928), an American silent film directed by Paul Leni and starring Conrad Veidt, Mary Philbin and Olga Baclanova. Veidt's appearance as Gwynplaine is cited as a key influence on the character design of the DC Comics villain The Joker, the nemesis of Batman. The film is also the namesake of an alternate version of Batman called The Batman Who Laughs.
- The Man Who Laughs (1966) (L'uomo che ride), an Italian-French film, also in an English dubbed version titled He Who Laughs, made in Italy and directed by Sergio Corbucci. This version features elaborate colour photography, but a very low production budget. The main action is shifted to Italy and moved backwards in time, with the deformed protagonist meeting Lucrezia Borgia instead of Queen Anne. In this version, Gwynplaine is renamed Angelo (played by Jean Sorel). His disfigurement is represented as a single broad slash across his mouth, crude yet convincing. The story (which is attributed, in the movie credits, to the director, producer and others involved in making the film, but not to Victor Hugo) is a swashbuckler pitting the disfigured acrobat against the henchmen of the Borgias. At the end, Dea (actress Lina Sini) miraculously acquires her eyesight and Angelo undergoes surgery that completely reverses his disfigurement and renders him perfectly handsome.
- L'Homme qui rit (fr:L'Homme qui rit (téléfilm) 1971), a three-part TV movie directed by Jean Kerchbron made and distributed in 1971 with a duration of nearly four hours. It is an adaptation of the novel in three episodes, starring Xavier Depraz as Ursus, Philippe Clay as Barkilphedro, Philippe Bouclet as the adult Gwynplaine and Delphine Desyeux as the adult Dea. Music was by Jean Wiéner.
- The Man Who Laughs (2012). This French movie features Gérard Depardieu as Ursus, Christa Théret as Dea and Marc-André Grondin as Gwynplaine.

=== Theatre ===
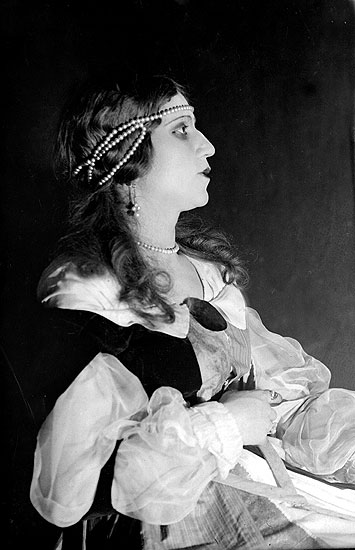
Azerbaijani actress Marziyya Davudova as Duchess Josiana (1929–1930)

- Clair de Lune, a stage play written by Blanche Oelrichs (under her male pseudonym Michael Strange), which ran for 64 performances on Broadway from April to June 1921. Oelrichs's husband at this time was the actor John Barrymore, who agreed to play Gwynplaine and persuaded his sister Ethel Barrymore to portray Queen Anne.
- In 2005, The Stolen Chair Theatre Company recreated the story as a "silent film for the stage". This drew equally from Hugo's novel, the 1928 Hollywood silent film, and from the creative minds of Stolen Chair. Stolen Chair's collectively created adaptation was staged as a live silent film, with stylized movement, original musical accompaniment, and projected intertitles. Gwynplaine was played by Jon Campbell. It played in New York, was published in the book Playing with Canons and was revived in 2013 by the same company.
- In 2006, the story was adapted into a musical by Alexandr Tyumencev (composer) and Tatyana Ziryanova (Russian lyrics), entitled 'The Man Who Laughs' ('Человек, который смеётся'). It was performed by the Seventh Morning Musical Theatre, opening November 6, 2006.
- In 2013, another musical version in Hampton Roads, VA featured a blend of Jewish, Gypsy and Russian song styles.
- In 2016, a musical adaptation titled The Grinning Man opened at the Bristol Old Vic, followed by a transfer to the Trafalgar Studios in London's West End from December 2017.
- In 2018, a musical adaptation written by Frank Wildhorn debuted in South Korea and starred Park Hyo Shin, EXO's Suho, and Kang-hyun Park. It won three awards including the Best Musical in the 2019 Korean Musical Awards. It was revived in 2020 with Suho (who won an award for his performance as Gwynplaine) and Kang-hyun Park returning to the title role, and joined by Super Junior's Kyuhyun. It was performed again in 2022. The musical is scheduled to return in 2025 with Kyuhyun, Park Eun-tae, Lee Seok-hoon and Doyoung (of NCT) as Gwynplaine.

=== Opera ===
- In 2023, Canadian composer Airat Ichmouratov composed an opera, The Man Who Laughs, to a libretto in French by poet Bertrand Laverdure, adapted from an eponymous novel. Commissioned by Festival Classica, it was premiered on May 31, 2023, in Montreal, Canada

=== Comics ===
- In May 1950, the Gilberton publishing company produced a comic-book adaptation of The Man Who Laughs as part of their prestigious Classics Illustrated series. This adaptation featured artwork by Alex Blum, much of it closely resembling the 1928 film (including the anachronistic Ferris wheel). The character of Gwynplaine is drawn as a handsome young man, quite normal except for two prominent creases at the sides of his mouth. A revised Classics Illustrated edition, with a more faithful script by Alfred Sundel, and a painted cover and new interior art by Norman Nodel, was issued in the spring of 1962. Nodel's artwork showed a Gwynplaine far more disfigured than the character's appearance in either the 1928 film or the 1950 Classics Illustrated edition.
- Another 1950s version, by Claude-Henri Juillard, was published in the Ce soir newspaper.
- A comic book version was produced by Spanish artist Fernando de Felipe in 1992, published by S. I. Artists and republished by Heavy Metal in 1994. This adaptation was intended for a mature audience and places more emphasis on the horrific elements of the story. De Felipe simplified and took some liberties with Hugo's storyline. His rendering emphasized the grotesque in Hugo and excluded the elements of the sublime that were equally important in the original.
- From 2003 to 2011 an adaptation created by Jean David Morvan (scenario) and Nicolas Delestret (drawings) was published in four volumes by Éditions Delcourt.
- A comic book version of the story was published by Self Made Hero in 2013, featuring writer David Hine and artist Mark Stafford.

=== Parody ===
Mark Twain wrote a parody of L'Homme qui Rit which attempted to offer parallels between Gwynplaine and Andrew Johnson.

== See also ==
- Glasgow smile
- Batman: The Man Who Laughs
