= The Girl with a Patron =

1925 film directed by Max Mack

- Directed by: Max Mack
- Written by: Willy Haas
- Produced by: Erich Pommer
- Starring: Ossi Oswalda; Willy Fritsch; Nora Gregor; Adele Sandrock
- Cinematography: Günther Krampf
- Production company: UFA
- Distributed by: UFA
- Release date: 21 December 1925
- Country: Germany
- Languages: Silent; German intertitles

The Girl with a Patron (German: Das Mädchen mit der Protektion) is a 1925 German silent comedy film directed by Max Mack and starring Ossi Oswalda, Willy Fritsch, and Nora Gregor. It was shot at the Babelsberg Studios in Berlin. It was one of a number of popular comedies released by UFA during the era alongside its more prestigious art films.

== Cast ==
- Ossi Oswalda as Tochter Marcelle
- Willy Fritsch as Neffe Charles
- Nora Gregor as Revuestar Orina Norowna
- Adele Sandrock as Madame
- Oreste Bilancia as Bankier Duval
- Paul Morgan as Theaterdirektor
- Karl Etlinger as Schneider Paul Poire
- Hugo Döblin as Giovanni Giovanelli
- Wilhelm Diegelmann as Assistant
- Georg Baselt as Vogel, der Maire
- Hans Junkermann as Bankdirektor
- Ernst Behmer as Ballettmeister
- Sophie Pagay
- Hans Albers

== Bibliography ==
- Kreimeier, Klaus (1999). The Ufa Story: A History of Germany's Greatest Film Company, 1918–1945. Berkeley: University of California Press. ISBN 978-0-520-22069-0.
