= The Rules of the Game =

1939 French film directed by Jean Renoir

- Theatrical release poster
- La Règle du jeu
- Directed by: Jean Renoir
- Written by: Jean Renoir; Carl Koch
- Produced by: Claude Renoir
- Starring: Nora Gregor; Paulette Dubost; Mila Parély; Marcel Dalio; Julien Carette; Roland Toutain; Gaston Modot; Pierre Magnier; Jean Renoir
- Cinematography: Jean Bachelet
- Edited by: Marguerite Renoir; Marthe Huguet
- Music by: Roger Désormière; Joseph Kosma
- Production company: Nouvelle Édition Française
- Distributed by: Gaumont
- Release date: July 7, 1939 (Paris)
- Running time: 110 minutes
- Country: France
- Language: French
- Budget: >5 million francs

The Rules of the Game (French: La Règle du jeu) is a 1939 French satirical comedy-drama film directed by Jean Renoir. The ensemble cast includes Nora Gregor, Paulette Dubost, Mila Parély, Marcel Dalio, Julien Carette, Roland Toutain, Gaston Modot, Pierre Magnier and Renoir.

Renoir's portrayal of the wise and mournful Octave anchors the fatalistic mood of this pensive comedy of manners. The film depicts members of upper-class French society and their servants just before the beginning of World War II, showing their moral callousness on the eve of destruction.

At the time, The Rules of the Game was the most expensive French film made: Its original budget of 2.5 million francs eventually increased to more than 5 million francs. Renoir and cinematographer Jean Bachelet made extensive use of deep-focus and long shots during which the camera is constantly moving—sophisticated cinematic techniques for 1939.

Renoir's career in France was at its pinnacle in 1939 and The Rules of the Game was eagerly anticipated. However, its premiere was met with scorn and disapproval by critics and audiences. Renoir reduced the film's running time from 113 minutes to 85, but even then, the film was a critical and financial disaster. In October 1939, it was banned by the wartime French government for "having an undesirable influence over the young".

For many years, the 85-minute version was the only one available; even so, its reputation slowly grew. However, in 1956, boxes of original material were discovered, and a reconstructed version of the film premiered that year at the Venice Film Festival, with only a minor scene from Renoir's first cut missing. Since then, The Rules of the Game has been called one of the greatest films in the history of cinema. Numerous film critics and directors have praised it highly, citing it as an inspiration for their own work. It is the only film to earn a place among the top ten films in the respected Sight & Sound (British Film Institute) decennial critics' poll for every decade from the poll's inception in 1952 through the 2012 list (in 2022 it fell to #13).

== Plot ==
Sensitive hearts, faithful hearts,
Who shun love whither it does range,
Cease to be so bitter:
Is it a crime to change?
If Cupid was given wings,
Was it not to flitter?

— Quotation at the beginning of the film, from Beaumarchais' Le Mariage de Figaro (IV, 10)

Aviator André Jurieux lands at Le Bourget Airfield outside Paris after crossing the Atlantic in his plane. He is greeted by his friend Octave, who tells André that Christine – the Austrian-French noblewoman André loves – has not come to greet him. André is heartbroken. When a radio reporter comes to broadcast André's first words upon landing, he explains his sorrow and denounces Christine. She is listening to the broadcast in her Paris apartment while attended by her maid, Lisette. Christine has been married to Robert, Marquis de la Chesnaye for three years. For two years, Lisette has been married to Schumacher – the gamekeeper at Robert's country estate, La Colinière in Sologne – but she is more devoted to Christine than to her husband. Christine's past relationship with André is openly known by her husband, her maid and their friend Octave. After Christine and Robert playfully discuss André's emotional display and pledge devotion to one another, Robert excuses himself to make a telephone call. He arranges to meet his mistress Geneviève the next morning.

At Geneviève's apartment, Robert says he must end their relationship but invites her to join them for a weekend retreat to La Colinière. Christine also invites her niece, Jackie. Later, Octave induces Robert to invite André to the estate as well. They joke that André and Geneviève will begin a relationship, thereby solving everyone's problems. At the estate, Schumacher is policing the grounds and trying to eliminate rabbits. Marceau – a poacher – sneaks onto the estate to retrieve a rabbit caught in a snare. Before Marceau can escape, Schumacher catches him and begins to escort him from the property when Robert demands to know what is happening. Marceau explains that he can catch rabbits and Robert hires him as a servant. Once inside the house, Marceau flirts with Lisette. The next morning the assembled guests go on a hunt led by Schumacher. On the way back to La Colinière's castle, Robert tells Geneviève that he no longer loves her. Geneviève unwillingly accepts but demands a kiss from Robert as a farewell, something that Christine accidentally sees while looking through a monocular. Because of this, later when Geneviève wants to pack up and leave Christine confronts her but persuades her to stay because this will make Robert pay less attention to Christine while André is present.

At a masked ball, various romantic liaisons are made. André and Christine declare their love for each other and plan to run away together. Marceau pursues Lisette, and the jealous Schumacher is upset. Robert and André come to an argument over Christine. In the secluded greenhouse, Octave declares that he too loves Christine – who is now having doubts about André – and they decide to run away together. Schumacher and Marceau, who have both been expelled from the estate by Robert after a fight over Lisette, watch Octave and Christine in the greenhouse. As in Beaumarchais' Marriage of Figaro, the literary basis for Mozart's opera, they mistake Christine for Lisette because Christine is wearing Lisette's cape and hood. Octave returns to the house for his coat and hat, where Lisette begs him not to leave with Christine.

Breaking his promise to Christine, Octave meets André and sends him out to Christine in the greenhouse, lending him his overcoat. When André reaches the greenhouse wearing Octave's coat, Schumacher mistakes him for Octave, whom he thinks is trying to run off with his wife Lisette, and Schumacher shoots him dead.

In the closing moments of the film, Octave and Marceau walk away into the night as Robert brings Schumacher back into the household and explains that he would report the killing to the authorities as nothing more than an unfortunate accident.

== Cast ==
- Nora Gregor as Christine, Marquise de la Chesnaye
- Paulette Dubost as Lisette, Christine's maid
- Marcel Dalio as Robert, Marquis de la Chesnaye, Christine's husband and Geneviève's lover
- Roland Toutain as André Jurieux, an aviator in love with Christine
- Jean Renoir as Octave, an old friend of Christine and friend of André
- Mila Parély as Geneviève de Marras, Robert's lover
- Julien Carette as Marceau, a poacher and Lisette's would-be lover
- Gaston Modot as Edouard Schumacher, Robert's gamekeeper and Lisette's husband
- Anne Mayen as Jackie, a niece of Christine
- Pierre Magnier as The General, a guest at Robert's estate
- Léon Larive as the cook
- Henri Cartier-Bresson as the English servant
- Marguerite de Morlaye as a guest
- Pierre Nay as Monsieur de St. Aubin, a guest at Robert's estate
- Richard Francœur as Monsieur La Bruyère, a guest at Robert's estate
- Odette Talazac as Madame de la Plante, a guest at Robert's estate
- Claire Gérard as Madame de la Bruyère, a guest at Robert's estate
- Lise Elina as the radio reporter at the airport
- Eddy Debray as Corneille, Robert's butler
- Géo Forster as the effeminate guest
- Tony Corteggiani as Monsieur Berthelin, a guest
- Nicolas Amato as Cava, a guest from South America
- Jenny Hélia as Germaine, a servant
- André Zwoboda as André's engineer at the airport
- Camille François as a radio reporter (voice)

Credits adapted from British Film Institute.

== Production ==
=== Background and writing ===
In 1938 the French film industry was booming, and Renoir was at the height of his career. He had had three consecutive hit films and La Grande Illusion had won awards from the New York Film Critics, the National Board of Review and the Venice Film Festival. The financial success of La Bête Humaine made it easy for Renoir to secure enough financial backing to form his own production company. In 1938 he founded Nouvelle Édition Française (NEF) with his brother Pierre Renoir, together with André Zwoboda, Oliver Billiou and Camille François. All five invested 10,000 francs into the company and intended to produce two films per year. The company was modeled after the American film production company United Artists, which was formed in 1919 as a film distribution company for independent artists by Charlie Chaplin, Douglas Fairbanks, D.W. Griffith and Mary Pickford. Renoir rallied his friends in the film industry around the company and got financial support from René Clair, Julien Duvivier, Jean Gabin and Simone Simon. NEF's headquarters on the Rue la Grange-Batelière was sublet from Marcel Pagnol's production company. On 8 December 1938 Georges Cravenne published a press release in Paris-Soir announcing that Renoir and Pagnol were about to sign an agreement to procure a large theatre where they would publicly screen "the films that they would direct from then on". The Rules of the Game was the only film produced by the company.

In May 1938, Renoir completed the historical drama La Marseillaise and wanted to make a comedy. He was anxious about the Munich Agreement and the strong possibility of another world war, and wanted to film a "happy dream" to subdue his pessimism. He wrote a synopsis for a film titled Les Millions d'Arlequin, which had characters similar to those in The Rules of the Game. When conceiving the film, Renoir was inspired by classical French art, such as the works of Pierre de Marivaux, Pierre-Augustin Caron de Beaumarchais and especially Alfred de Musset's play Les Caprices de Marianne, which Renoir initially intended to adapt; NEF first announced the film as an adaptation of it. Renoir later said he never intended to directly adapt Les Caprices de Marianne but only to re-read it and other classics of French literature for inspiration.

After returning from lecturing in London in January 1939, Renoir left Paris to work on a script. He told a reporter that his next film would be "A precise description of the bourgeois of our age." Renoir, Carl Koch and Zwoboda went to Marlotte to work on the script. Because Renoir wanted to allow the actors to improvise their dialogue, only one-third of the film was scripted and the rest was a detailed outline. Renoir later said that his "ambition when I made the film was to illustrate this remark: we are dancing on a volcano". Renoir called the film a "divertissement" for its use of baroque music and aspects of classical French comedies. Renoir's initial inspiration by Les Caprices de Marianne led to the film's four main characters correlating with those of the play; a virtuous wife, a jealous husband, a despairing lover and an interceding friend. In both the play and the film the interceding friend is named Octave. Octave is also the only one of the four characters inspired by the play that shares traits with its counterpart. In both works, Octave is a "sad clown" full of self-doubt and self-pity. The characters' names constantly changed between versions of the script; Renoir said that in an early draft, André Jurieux was an orchestra conductor rather than an aviator.

=== Casting ===
Nora Gregor in 1932. Renoir re-wrote the character Christine for the Austrian actress and reportedly fell in love with her during pre-production.

Renoir originally wanted the entire cast of La bête humaine – including Fernand Ledoux, Simone Simon, Jean Gabin and Julien Carette – for the film. Gabin was offered the role of André but rejected it and accepted a role in Marcel Carné's Le jour se lève instead. He was replaced by Roland Toutain. Simon was offered the role of Christine but wanted 800,000 francs, which was a third of the film's entire budget. Simon's salary request was vetoed by NEF administrator Camille François. Ledoux was offered the role of Schumacher. He was married to Simon at the time; he declined when her salary request was denied and instead took a role in Maurice Tourneur's Volpone. He was replaced by Gaston Modot. Claude Dauphin was offered the role of the Marquis de la Chesnaye; he refused it and instead acted with Simon in Raymond Bernard's Cavalcade d'amour. Renoir then cast Marcel Dalio as the Marquis. Years later, Dalio asked Renoir why he had been cast after having typically played burlesque or traitorous roles. Renoir told Dalio that he was the opposite of the cliché of what a Marquis was and that Dalio was the only actor he knew that could portray the character's insecurity. Renoir's brother Pierre was cast as Octave, and Carette was cast as Marceau.

François suggested newly famous stage actress Michele Alfa for the role of Christine, and Renoir went with his common-law wife Marguerite and Zwoboda to see her perform in a play. While at the play Renoir noticed Nora Gregor in a box seat in the audience and asked about her during the intermission. He learned that Gregor was the wife of Prince Ernst Rüdiger von Starhemberg, an Austrian nobleman. Renoir became friends with Gregor and her husband, getting to know them over several dinners in Paris. Starhemberg was forced to resign his leadership role in the Heimwehr – a paramilitary anti-democratic organization – because Gregor was Jewish and he was anti-fascist. When Germany annexed Austria in March 1938 Gregor and Starhemberg fled to France. Renoir said they were "in a state of great disarray. Everything they believed in was collapsing." Gregor was an actress from the Viennese Burgtheater and had appeared in some films, including Carl Theodor Dreyer's Michael. Gregor's first husband had been the concert pianist Mitja Nikisch, son of the renowned conductor Arthur Nikisch of the Leipzig Opera and according to film theorist Charles Drazin, a possible inspiration for some characteristics of Octave.

Despite objections from his NEF colleagues, Renoir hired Gregor for the role of Christine. She was older than the original character, and he made changes to the character based on Gregor's personality and on their dinner conversations, such as making Christine the daughter of an Austrian conductor. Many of Renoir's friends believed he fell in love with Gregor shortly after casting her. Zwoboda said Gregor had "that which Renoir loved above all; an incontestable class, a style, the gestures and bearing of a great distinction". Renoir said he cast Gregor because of her Austrian accent, which he believed would create "a little barrier ... between her and her surroundings" and because of her appearance, which he considered "birdlike" and "sincere".

Renoir finished casting the remaining roles by late January 1939. When asked who the main character of the film was, Renoir answered: "There isn't any! My conception at the beginning – and at the end – was to make a film d'ensemble, a film representing a society, a group of persons, almost a whole class, and not a film of personal affairs."

=== Filming ===
Filming for exterior scenes set in the country began on 15 February 1939, in Sologne and outside the Chateau de la Ferté-Saint-Aubin. Renoir later said he chose Sologne because his father Pierre-Auguste Renoir "regretted that he had never been able to paint [it]. How well I understand the sincerity of those regrets before these beautiful landscapes of Sologne, in astonishing colors, of a grace so melancholy yet so gentle." Renoir said Sologne's mist "took me back to the happy days of my childhood."

The cast and crew arrived in Sologne between 6 and 15 February. Renoir's son Alain worked as an assistant camera operator and Dido Freire worked as the script girl. Renoir's assistants on the film were Koch, Zwoboda and Henri Cartier-Bresson. Tony Corteggiani was hired as a technical advisor for the rabbit hunting sequence. The cast and crew stayed at Hotel Rat in Lamotte-Beuvron. Heavy rainfall prevented the start of shooting in Sologne for several weeks and Renoir rewrote parts of the script to accommodate the rain. While he finished the script the entire company played cards and bonded; they described it as a happy time in their lives just before the horrors of World War II began. Paulette Dubost said shooting the film was great fun.

The delays caused Pierre Renoir to pull out of the film because of prior commitments to stage plays in Paris. Renoir then asked Michel Simon to play Octave but Simon was busy with other projects. Renoir finally cast himself, later saying that he "was just waiting for the moment when Pierre would say 'Why don't you play the role yourself, Jean?' He didn't have to ask me twice." He added that after having gained experience and confidence as a director his "most stubborn dream has been to be an actor." Renoir rewrote the role of Octave to better suit himself since he and Pierre were physically and personally very different.

To raise additional funding for the over-running production, Zwoboda had used the success of La Bête Humaine to sell advanced screening rights in large theatres to Jean Jay, the director of Gaumont. When shooting in Sologne finally began progress was slow because of the constant improvisations of the actors – which Renoir encouraged – and Gregor's struggles with her role. Jay visited the set and was unhappy with the slow progress and with Renoir's performance. The cast and crew however admired Renoir and enjoyed the carefree atmosphere on set, forgetting about the impending political situation. The cast's improvisations caused some changes from the original script. Christine was initially written as a bored, upper class bourgeois whose main preoccupation was planning parties, but Renoir amended this to accommodate Gregor's acting. Renoir also cut most of the references to Christine's conductor father Stiller, such as his relationship with the Marquis. The Marquis was initially written as a patron of the arts and music instead of a collector of music boxes.

Journalists often visited the set and wrote positively about the production. The film was shot almost chronologically in Sologne and again in Joinville, Val-de-Marne, which Renoir considered important for the actors' performances. Renoir said he did not need to do much directing since the actors were so involved in their roles. When directing himself, Renoir arranged the performers movements first then acted in the scenes. Jay pushed Renoir to finish filming in Sologne and move the production to sets erected at the Pathé studios in Joinville. Renoir finally agreed and left Zwoboda, Corteggiani and Cartier-Bresson in Sologne to shoot B-roll footage of the rabbit hunting sequence. Hundreds of animals were killed during filming and local people were used as stand-ins for the actors.

Filming on the sets in Joinville continued at a slow pace. Renoir would often film fifteen to twenty takes of individual shots and change dialogue on the set, making previous takes useless. Film historian Joel Finler said the film "truly evolved " during its making, as Renoir worked on writing and rewriting the script, balancing and rebalancing the characters and relationships, plots and subplots." Cartier-Bresson said the improvisation during filming was like a jam session; both cast and crew members were encouraged to suggest ideas and dialogue would often change on the morning of the shoot.

On 16 March 1939, Germany invaded Czechoslovakia, breaking the Munich Agreement, which caused the French Army to start mobilizing in anticipation of a coming war. Shortly afterwards, several of the film's electricians and technicians left to join the army. Set designer Eugène Lourié left because he was Jewish and a communist, and Max Douy took over as the film's set designer.

During filming, Renoir became disappointed by Gregor's performance. He began to cut her scenes and add new scenes for Paulette Dubost and Mila Parély. Film historian Gerald Mast found Gregor's performance to be "as haunting and bewitching as a plastic giraffe." During production, Jay told Renoir he hated his performance as Octave. Renoir offered to replace himself with Michel Simon, but Jay refused because two-thirds of the film had already been shot. Jay asked Renoir to instead remove Octave's scenes, which had not yet been shot. Renoir refused, and throughout shooting he added new scenes for Octave. Shooting in Joinville finally wrapped in May 1939; the film was over schedule and the rented soundstage was needed for other films. Renoir originally wanted to release the film in June because the potential war would make a post-summer release impossible.

Renoir continued shooting additional scenes with some of the actors. The opening scene at the airfield was shot in mid-June at the Bourget Airport in the middle of the night with whatever extras they could find. Renoir almost ran out of money when he filmed the car crash scene, which was shot very quickly with Alain Renoir as the camera operator. Renoir never liked the scene and initially removed it. The principal photography was nine and a half weeks over schedule when it finally wrapped in June.

Despite beginning the shoot in love with Gregor, Renoir's infatuation remained unrequited. During the film's production, he ended his relationship with Marguerite and began another with script girl Dido Freire, whom he had known for 12 years and was Alain Renoir's nanny. Eventually Dido married Renoir.

== Release ==
=== Initial editing and previews ===
Renoir edited the film while shooting; his first cut was three hours long. He and editor Marguerite completed a 113-minute final cut of the film in July 1939. Jay hated it and demanded that Renoir make cuts, including the excision of Renoir's entire performance as Octave. Renoir refused to completely omit Octave but agreed to remove 13 minutes from the film.

The Rules of the Game was the most expensive film produced in France when it was released. Its original budget had been 2.5 million francs (which already made it the most expensive French film of that year) and was increased by another 2 million francs, costing over 5 million francs total.

The film had an elaborate advertising campaign that began one week before its release in anticipation of it becoming another hit film for Renoir. This campaign included a promotional crossword puzzle published three days before the film's opening night; the prize for solving the puzzle was free tickets.

The first preview screening of the 113-minute version of The Rules of the Game took place on 28 June 1939. It received a poor reaction from the audience. On 29 June, the film was screened for the Minister of National Education and Fine Arts Jean Zay and for the jury of the annual Louis Delluc Prize for the best French film. When the awards were announced 10 days later, Marcel Carne's Le Quai des brumes won the first prize and The Rules of the Game was not a runner-up. Because of the success and popularity of Renoir's previous films, The Rules of the Game was highly anticipated, and Zay had expected to award it the prize. Renoir later said he thought the film would be commercially successful.

=== Release and reception ===
The Rules of the Game premiered on Friday, 7 July 1939, at the Colisée Theatre in Paris to a full house and later at the Aubert Palace also in Paris. It was shown on a double bill with a patriotic documentary about French history. The audience at the screening consisted of members of the right-wing organisations, who booed. Paulette Dubost said people at the screening fought, and one person tried to set fire to the theater. Renoir said he "depicted pleasant, sympathetic characters, but showed them in a society in the process of disintegration, so that they were defeated at the onset ... the audience recognized this. The truth is that they recognized themselves. People who commit suicide do not care to do it in front of witnesses."

In France, film attendance was typically low in July; The Rules of the Game ended its run at the Colisée Theatre after three weeks because of poor attendance. It later was shown at the Aubert-Palace in Paris. Renoir said of the attendance "I was utterly dumbfounded when it became apparent that the film, which I wanted to be a pleasant one, rubbed most people the wrong way." Renoir initially wanted to screen the film at the 1939 World's Fair in New York City, but this idea was abandoned after the disastrous release in France.

Claude Gauteur surveyed reviews of The Rules of the Game published in Paris and said 12 were "unqualifiedly unfavorable", 13 were "favorable with reservations", and 10 were "favorable." Many reviews criticized the film for being "unpatriotic, frivolous and incomprehensible." One mixed review came from Nino Frank of Pour Vous, who called it "a copious work, even too much so, very complex and profoundly intelligent from one end to the other." Le Figaro called it a "bizarre spectacle" which was "one long succession of errors ... a heavy-handed fantasy with wooly dialogue." In the 1943 edition of Histoire du cinéma, Robert Brasillach wrote that The Rules of the Game was among Renoir's most "jumbled" and "confused" films but applauded the biting satire, which he considered "Proustian." Brasillach also praised the technical variation employed by the director and said the film was an unrealized masterpiece. In the United States, a negative review from Variety said Renoir "attempts to crowd too many ideas into 80 minutes of film fare, resulting in confusion." According to François Truffaut, the film was very disconcerting to audiences at the time because of its peculiar atmosphere, which explains its commercial failure.

Nora Gregor, Jean Renoir, Pierre Nay and Pierre Magnier during the rabbit hunt scene. Renoir cut most of his own performance as Octave after the film's negative reception.

While the film received mostly unfavorable reviews, most critics praised the acting – including Renoir's, and only the far right-wing press criticized Marcel Dalio's performance. In July 1939 a right-wing French newspaper criticized the film for portraying the Jewish Marquis married to the Austrian Christine. The Union Sacrée, a French clerical fascist group, organized demonstrations wherever the film was screened. Renoir was a known pacifist and supporter of the Communist Party, which made him unpopular in the tense weeks before World War II began. Years later Renoir said, "There was no question of contrivance; my enemies had nothing to do with its failure. At every session I attended I could feel the unanimous disapproval of the audience."

In the weeks that followed the premiere, Renoir reduced the film's running time from its original 113 minutes to 100 minutes, then to 90 minutes and finally to 85 minutes. He told Margurite Renoir and Zwoboda to cut the scenes that the audience had found the most upsetting. Renoir said he mostly cut his own scenes or dialogue "as though I were ashamed, after this rebuff, of showing myself on the screen." He later defended his own performance as being awkward – the way Octave should have been. The reduction in length removed Octave's complexity and completely changed the character's motives at the end of the film. In the 85-minute version, Octave does not intend to run away with Christine and merely lends André his coat for warmth before sending him out to the greenhouse. The omission of this item in the plot resulted in the misconception that the film has an alternative ending; this was first reported by Roger Manvell after he watched it at its London premiere in 1946. At one point, Jean Jay told Renoir to restore the film to the 100-minute version "to avoid commercial disaster", but none of the shorter versions improved its reception or attendance figures. When asked about the film's poor reception with audience members, Renoir said "I thought I was gentle with them, and they thought I was laughing at them."

In October 1939 The Rules of the Game officially was banned in France for being "depressing, morbid, immoral [and] having an undesirable influence over the young." Other films that were similarly banned included Marcel Carné's Le Quai des brumes and Le Jour Se Lève. The Ministry of Foreign Affairs stated "we are especially anxious to avoid representations of our country, our traditions, and our race that changes its character, lie about it, and deform it through the prism of an artistic individual who is often original but not always sound." The Marriage of Figaro, one of the inspirations for the film, had been banned for similar reasons. After the end of World War II, the 85-minute version of the film was re-released in Paris on 26 September 1945, and it was banned again.

Renoir said that of all his films, The Rules of the Game was the biggest failure at the time of its release. He also said its failure "so depressed me that I resolved to either give up the cinema or to leave France." During shooting, Renoir was offered the chance to film an adaptation of Tosca by Italian producers; he agreed to the deal on 14 July 1939, and saw it as an opportunity to leave France. Renoir and Carl Koch traveled to Rome on 10 August for pre-production, but had to leave on 23 August after the German-Soviet pact made his French citizenship an issue. Koch directed the film instead and Renoir emigrated to Hollywood.

== Rediscovery ==
In 1942, during one of the Allied bombings of Boulogne-sur-Seine, the G.M. Film Lab, which housed the original negative of The Rules of the Game, was destroyed. In 1946, a print of the 85-minute version was found in a box, and a new print was made from it. This version was occasionally screened at film clubs, cinematheques and film festivals, and its reputation slowly began to grow. It finally premiered in New York City in April 1950, but it was critically unsuccessful. A review in The New York Times called it "one for the buzzards" and stated "the master has dealt his admirers a pointless, thudding punch below the belt." In 1952, the 85-minute version was included in Sight & Sound's inaugural list of the 10 greatest films ever made.

In 1956, film enthusiasts Jean Gaborit and Jacques Maréchal founded the Société des Grands Films Classiques, a film restoration company focused on neglected films. The Rules of the Game was one of the company's early restorations; Gaborit and Maréchal persuaded Camille François to sell them the rights to the film. With François' help, they discovered records that led to 224 boxes that had been found at the bombed G.M. Film Lab site. These boxes included negative prints, duplicated prints, and sound mixes of the film. With the help and advice of Renoir and Jacques Durand, Gaborit and Maréchal restored most of the cut footage from Renoir's original version and assembled a 106-minute version of the film.

In mid-1959, Renoir saw the reconstructed version of the film for the first time and left the theater in tears. He said, "There is only one scene missing in this re-construction, a scene that isn't very important. It's a scene with me and Roland Toutain that deals with the maids' sexual interest." The restored version premiered at the 1959 Venice Film Festival, where it was called a masterpiece. Claude Chabrol, Alain Resnais and Louis Malle were all in attendance and publicly called Renoir their master while praising the reconstructed version of the film. In 1961 Howard Thompson of The New York Times stated the film "completely justified its European reputation ... [it is] a memorable experience." Archer Winsten of the New York Post praised the film for "showing the corruption of French society from top to bottom" and a New York Herald Tribune review called it "a satire on French society ... a sharp criticism of social pretenses." The reconstructed version of the film was exhibited in France on 23 April 1965. It won the 1966 Bodil Award for Best Non-American Film/Best European Film (Bedste europæiske film) in Denmark.

== Themes ==
"We are all 'mystified' – that is to say, fooled, duped, treated as of no account. I had the good fortune to have been taught to see through the trickery in my youth. In La Règle du Jeu, I passed on what I knew to the public. But this is something that people do not like; the truth makes them feel uncomfortable."

— Jean Renoir, from his autobiography

The Rules of the Game is remembered as a commentary on the moral callousness of the European upper class and their servants just before World War II. While making the film, Renoir knew a new world war was coming; he later said there was a sense of it in film, and wrote "it is a war film and yet there is no reference to the war". This sense of doom began just before shooting started in January when Barcelona fell to Franco and throughout the production when Prime Minister of France Édouard Daladier recognized Francoist Spain, Italy annexed Albania and Adolf Hitler prepared his Invasion of Poland. Renoir articulated this unmentioned theme of the film by saying:

what is interesting about this film, perhaps, is the moment when it was made. It was shot between Munich and the war, and I shot it absolutely impressed, absolutely disturbed by the state of mind of a part of French society, a part of English society, a part of world society. And it seemed to me that a way of interpreting this state of mind, to the world hopefully, was not to talk of that situation, but tell a frivolous story. I looked for inspiration to Beaumarchais, to Marivaux, to the classical authors of comedy.

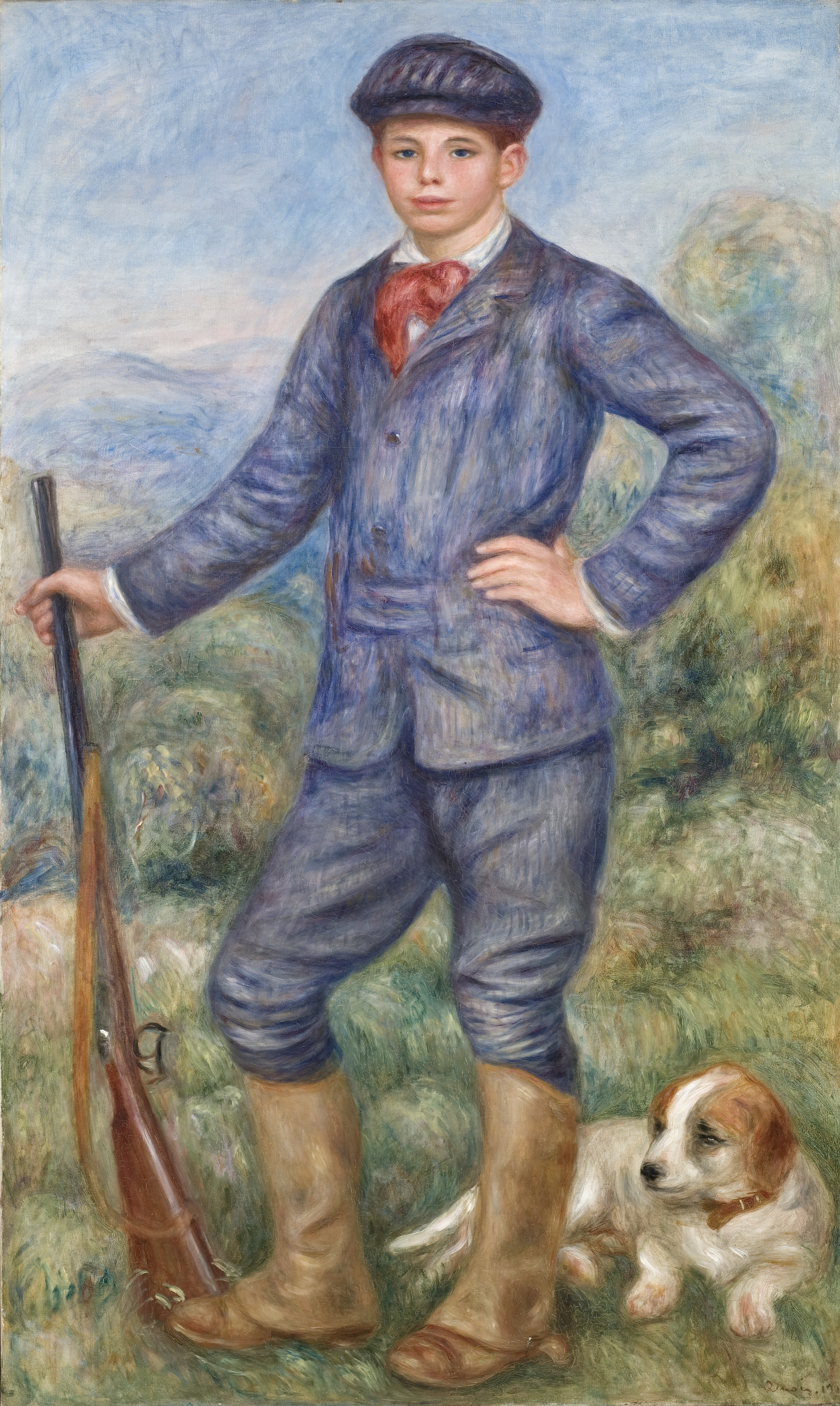
Renoir's father, Pierre-Auguste Renoir, painted him in Portrait of Jean Renoir as a hunter (1910). Jean considered hunting to be cruel, and did not film The Rules of the Game's hunting scene himself.

Renoir wanted to depict people as they truly were at that point in history; he said The Rules of the Game was "a reconstructed documentary, a documentary on the condition of a society at a given moment". He believed this depiction was the reason behind the film's disastrous premiere, saying "the audience's reaction was due to my candour". The Marriage of Figaro, an inspiration for the film, had also been considered controversial for its attack on the class system. The Rules of the Game remained controversial with the French public shortly after World War II when it was once again banned. Renoir's biographer Ronald Bergan said the film hit a raw nerve with the public by depicting "people, who might have had an influence in shaping the world, [but] did nothing to prevent an advance of Fascism; some of whom, indeed, actually welcomed it".

The rabbit hunt scene is often compared to the senseless death that occurs during war; Renoir said he wanted to show a certain class of people killing for no reason. Renoir himself had never killed an animal and called hunting "an abominable exercise in cruelty". Bergan saw the analogy to world events and wrote "in the great set piece of the hunt, the callous cruelty of the guests is laid bare as they fire at any rabbit and bird that moves after the beaters have led the game to slaughter".

The film's most-quoted line of dialogue, spoken by Octave, is "You see, in this world, there is one awful thing, and that is that everyone has his reasons". Renoir's sentiment of objective humanism for the film's characters is articulated by Octave's remark and shows his empathy for the people he was simultaneously criticizing. Richard Roud praised Renoir's role in the film, observing that Renoir's honesty compelled him to include his own role in his social criticism: "he did not wish to stand outside. And Renoir/Octave serves as the standard against which reality and fiction can be measured." In his original outline for the film, Renoir said he intended all the characters to be sincere and that the film would have no villains.

Renoir said André was "the victim, who, trying to fit into a world in which he does not belong, fails to respect the rules of the game", and that André thought he could shatter the rules by a world flight, while Christine thought she could do the same by following her heart. The "rules" of the film's title are its only villain. Renoir said "the world is made up of cliques ... Each of these cliques has its customs, its mores, indeed, its own language. To put it simply, each has its rules, and these rules determine the game." Renoir said all human activity is "subject to social protocols that are less apparent than, but just as strict as, those practiced by Louis XIV." Renoir's son Alain said the film continues to be relevant and popular because it shows the artificial joy of the modern age in contrast to the rules of that (or any) age.

== Style ==
Filming Émile Zola's La Bête Humaine inspired Renoir to "make a break, and perhaps get away from naturalism completely, to try to touch on a more classical, more poetic genre." While shooting, Renoir began listening to baroque music by Louis Couperin, Jean-Philippe Rameau, Jean-Baptiste Lully and André Grétry. He later said "Little by little, my idea took shape and the subject got simpler. I kept living on baroque rhythms, and after a few more days, the subject became more and more precise." He also said he began imagining Simone Simon "moving to the spirit of the music." This preoccupation with baroque music during filming led to Renoir's original idea of adapting Les Caprices de Marianne into a film.

The Rules of the Game is known for its early and elaborate use of deep focus cinematography. Renoir said he and his cinematographer Jean Bachelet "ordered some special lenses, very fast lenses, but ones that still gave us considerable depth, so that we could keep our backgrounds in focus almost all the time." This depth of field in his shots allowed Renoir to shoot in large rooms and long corridors in the chateau sequences, and characters were able to move freely between the background and the foreground. Approximately half of the shots in the film have camera movements. In many shots the camera moves, stops in place, changes direction and circles around the subjects. Film critic David Thomson said "one has the impression of a camera that is always moving to cover as much as possible. One does not notice cuts, one delights in a continuity which is often on the verge of chaos and finally leads to tragedy in the intrusion of subplot into plot, of the theatrical into the real and of disaster into balances."

Renoir used few close-ups or reverse shots and most of the shots are two shots. The hunt scene differs from the rest of the film; it uses rapid editing whereas most of the film uses long takes of dialogue or action. Renoir wanted to shoot the film in color to take advantage of the beauty of Sologne in the winter but he was unable to secure funding from Jean Jay. One week before filming began Renoir tried to persuade Technicolor to fund the color cinematography but the company refused.

The sound in the film was complex for its time; it included dialogue spoken over ambient noises such as crowds at the airport and gunfire during the hunt. Film director Jean Prat said the film's soundtrack was "of a perfection never equaled by any French film." Characters often talk at once or talk over each other's lines. One example of the dense soundtrack is the party scene, which includes dialogue over screams, gunfire and music. Except for the opening credits and the very end of the film, all of the music heard in the film is incidental. The sound engineer was Joseph de Bretagne. Music used in the film includes Mozart's Three German Dances, Monsigny's Le déserteur, Louis Byrec, Léon Garnier and Eugène Rimbault's En revenant de la revue, Strauss' Die Fledermaus, Saint-Saëns' Danse macabre, Chopin's Minute Waltz and Scotto's À Barbizon. The music was arranged by Joseph Kosma and Roger Désormière.

The film's set designers Eugène Lourié and Max Douy built one of the most expensive sets in French film history at the Joinville Studio. According to Douy they were based on the script and were not reproductions of the interior of Chateau de la Ferté-Saint-Aubin, where exterior scenes were shot. The music boxes used in the film were borrowed from several sources and some are now in a museum in Neuilly-sur-Seine. Renoir thought the musical organ scene and Dalio's performance in it was the best scene he had ever filmed. He shot the scene several times before he was satisfied with it. The costumes for the film were designed by Coco Chanel.

== Legacy ==
Since its restoration, The Rules of the Game has come to be regarded by many film critics and directors as one of the greatest films of all time. On Rotten Tomatoes, the film has a rating of 97% based on 59 reviews, with an average rating of 9.80/10. The website's consensus reads, "Its genius escaped many viewers at the time, but in retrospect, The Rules of the Game stands as one of Jean Renoir's—and cinema's—finest works." On Metacritic, which assigns films scores out of 100 based on aggregated reviews, The Rules of the Game has a rating of 99 based on 21 critics, indicating "Universal Acclaim". The decennial poll of international critics by Sight & Sound magazine ranked it #10 in 1952, elevated it to No. 3 in 1962, and #2 in 1972, 1982 and 1992. In 2002 it fell to No. 3 behind Citizen Kane and Vertigo. In 2012, it fell to No. 4, behind Vertigo, Citizen Kane, and Tokyo Story. It is the only film to have been included on every top ten list since 1952, that is until the 2022 list when it fell to #13. Empire magazine ranked at number 13 in its list of "The 100 Best Films Of World Cinema" in 2010. In Le Figaro's 2008 list of the greatest films ever made it tied for second with The Night of the Hunter, behind Citizen Kane. In 2018 the film ranked fifth on the BBC's list of the 100 greatest foreign-language films, as voted on by 209 film critics from 43 countries.

Critics and directors who have placed it on their Sight & Sound lists include Richard Peña, Michel Ciment, David Denby, Lawrence Kasdan, Steve McQueen and Paul Schrader. Schrader said the film "has it all ... [it] represents all that film can be." Martin Scorsese included it on a list of "39 Essential Foreign Films for a Young Filmmaker." French film critic André Bazin praised the film's mobile cinematographic style; he said its depth of field and deep focus mise-en-scène resembled that seen in Citizen Kane and The Best Years of Our Lives.

Many contemporary film critics have written favorably about the film. It has been hailed as a masterpiece by Kent Jones, Adolf Heinzlmeier, Berndt Schulz and Penelope Gilliatt, who said it was "not only a masterpiece of filmmaking, not only a great work of humanism in a perfect rococo frame, but also an act of historical testimony." Pauline Kael praised it: "Perhaps the most influential of all French films, and one of the most richly entertaining." Its themes have been analyzed by film scholar and Renoir's biographer Leo Braudy, who observed that the film "embodies a social world in which there are rules but no values. If you don't know the rules, you are crushed; but if you do know the rules you are cut off from your own nature." Dudley Andrew described the film's "complex social criticism" while Kenneth Browser and Peter Cowie wrote about its sense of humanity. Other critics have written about the film's darker themes; Andrew Sarris praised its depiction of class differences. The complexity of Renoir's storytelling techniques have been examined by Roger Ebert, who called it "so simple and so labyrinthine, so guileless and so angry, so innocent and so dangerous, that you can't simply watch it, you have to absorb it", Lucy Sante, who labeled it "a dense clockwork mechanism" and Robin Wood, who said the film "operates on all levels." Critics have praised its farcical elements: Pauline Kael characterized it as "a great satirical comedy, a dance of death" and Gerald Mast wrote "[it] depicts the failure of love, the failure of society, and the failure of men to rise above the ridiculous. Their only success is that they try and they care." David Thomson praised Renoir's performance and remarked on "Renoir's admission that the director, supposedly the authoritative and manipulating figure, is as much victim as originator of circumstances." Amy Taubin said "I can think of no other film that is as unfailingly generous – to its audience, its characters, its actors, the milieu and the medium." J. Hoberman wrote about its influence on Woody Allen, Robert Altman and Mike Leigh.

The film especially was appreciated by filmmakers and film critics associated with the French New Wave movement. Bazin said "as a conventional love story, the film could have been a success if the scenario had respected the rules of the movie game. But Renoir wanted to make his own style of drame gai [merry drama], and the mixture of genres proved disconcerting to the public." Film critic Claude Beylie called it "the cornerstone of the work of Jean Renoir, the point of arrival and the swan song of the French cinema of the thirties ...The Rules of the Game is a rare combination of satire, vaudeville and tragedy." It was a major source of inspiration for Alain Resnais, who said seeing the film was "the single most overwhelming experience I have ever had at the cinema";and Louis Malle, who said "for all of us, my generation of French filmmakers, La Règle du jeu was the absolute masterpiece." François Truffaut articulated the film's enormous influence and said "it isn't an accident that The Rules of the Game inspired a large number of young people who had first thought of expressing themselves as novelists to take up careers as filmmakers." He also said "It is the credo of movie lovers, the film of films, the film most hated when it was made and most appreciated afterwards, to the extent that it ultimately became a true commercial success."

Satyajit Ray called it "a film that doesn't wear its innovations on its sleeve ... Humanist? Classical? Avant-Garde? Contemporary? I defy anyone to give it a label. This is the kind of innovation that appeals to me." Other notable filmmakers who have praised it include Bernardo Bertolucci, Wim Wenders, Peter Bogdanovich, Noah Baumbach and Cameron Crowe. Henri Cartier-Bresson, who worked on the film before beginning a long career as a photojournalist, called it "one of the summits of art and a premonition of everything that was to happen in the world." Robert Altman said "The Rules of the Game taught me the rules of the game."

Altman's Gosford Park is similar to The Rules of the Game in many of its plot elements, including the relationship between wealthy people and their servants as well as the hunting sequence. Italian film critic Francis Vanoye stated The Rules of the Game has influenced numerous films that feature a group of characters who spend a short time together at a party or gathering – often while hunting animals – during which their true feelings about each other are revealed. Along with Gosford Park, these films include Jean Grémillon's Summer Light, Ingmar Bergman's Smiles of a Summer Night, Carlos Saura's The Hunt, Peter Fleischmann's Hunting Scenes from Bavaria, Nikita Mikhalkov's An Unfinished Piece for a Player Piano, Theo Angelopoulos's The Hunters and Denys Arcand's The Decline of the American Empire. Paul Bartel's Scenes from the Class Struggle in Beverly Hills and Lawrence Kasdan's The Big Chill have also been compared to The Rules of the Game.

== See also ==
- Cinema of France
- List of French-language films
- List of films considered the best
