= Eugen Jensen =

Austrian actor (1871–1957)

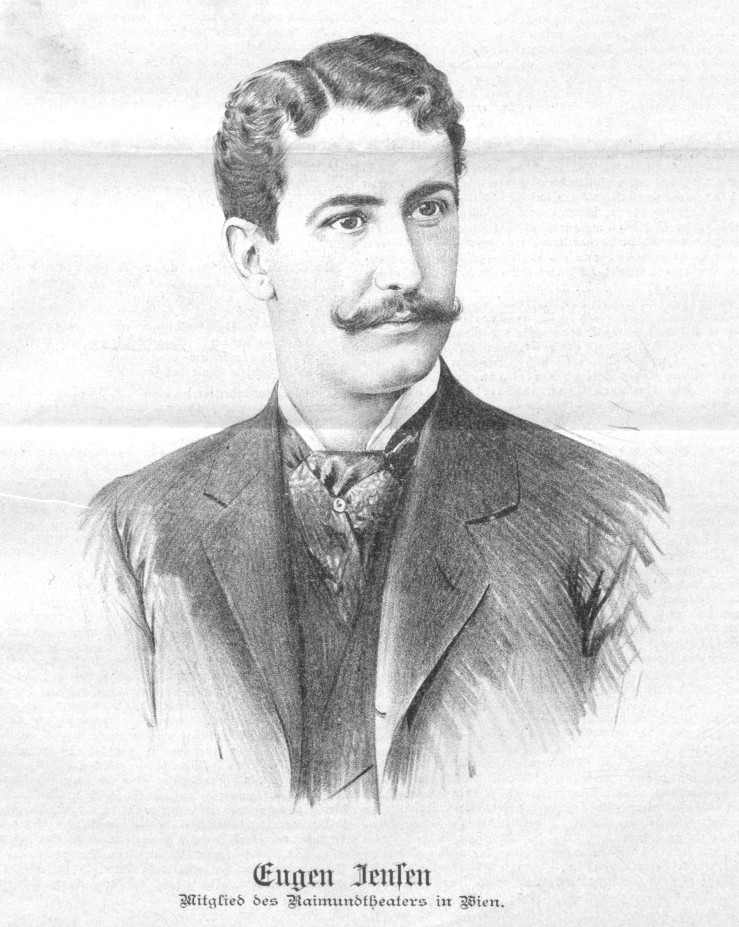
- A drawing of Jensen from 1898.
- Born: 26 January 1871; Vienna, Austro-Hungarian Empire
- Died: 23 November 1957 (aged 86); Munich, West Germany
- Occupations: Film actor Stage actor
- Years active: 1914-1950 (film)

Eugen Jensen (1871–1957) was an Austrian stage and film actor. He worked frequently in the Austrian and German cinemas during the silent era in supporting roles in films such as The Love of Jeanne Ney (1927). Following the Anchluss of 1938, Jensen emigrated to Switzerland. He was married to the actresses Alice Lach and Rosa Montani.

== Selected filmography ==
- In Thrall to the Claw (1921)
- Das grinsende Gesicht (1921)
- The House in Dragon Street (1921)
- The Separating Bridge (1922)
- The Portrait (1923)
- Hotel Potemkin (1924)
- The Uninvited Guest (1925)
- The Third Squadron (1926)
- Lützow's Wild Hunt (1927)
- The Love of Jeanne Ney (1927)
- Die Fledermaus (1931)
- Der Herzog von Reichstadt (1931)
- Reckless Youth (1931)
- Wehe, wenn er losgelassen (1932)
- The Magic Top Hat (1932)
- Adventures on the Lido (1933)
- A Thousand for One Night (1933)

== Bibliography ==
- Eisner, Lotte H. The Haunted Screen: Expressionism in the German Cinema and the Influence of Max Reinhardt. University of California Press, 2008.
