= Eduard Hoesch =

Austrian cinematographer (1890–1983)

Eduard Hoesch (15 March 1890 – 5 November 1983) was an Austrian cinematographer and film producer.

== Selected filmography ==
- The Grinning Face (1921)
- Meriota the Dancer (1922)
- The Separating Bridge (1922)
- The Little Sin (1923)
- Hotel Potemkin (1924)
- Colonel Redl (1925)
- A Waltz by Strauss (1925)
- The Young Man from the Ragtrade (1926)
- Her Highness Dances the Waltz (1926)
- The Arsonists of Europe (1926)
- The Orlov (1927)
- Flirtation (1927)
- The Prince's Child (1927)
- German Women - German Faithfulness (1927)
- The Merry Farmer (1927)
- The Gallant Hussar (1928)
- The Little Slave (1928)
- The Most Beautiful Woman in Paris (1928)
- Dyckerpotts' Heirs (1928)
- The Weekend Bride (1928)
- Number 17 (1928)
- Spring Awakening (1929)
- Latin Quarter (1929)
- Lieutenant of His Majesty (1929)
- The Tsarevich (1929)
- Black Forest Girl (1929)
- Rendezvous (1930)
- The Cabinet of Doctor Larifari (1930)
- A Girl from the Reeperbahn (1930)
- Love Songs (1930)
- Madame Bluebeard (1931)
- The Case of Colonel Redl (1931)
- Hyppolit, the Butler (1931)
- When the Soldiers (1931)
- Cadets (1931)
- An Auto and No Money (1932)
- The Triangle of Fire (1932)
- Laughing Heirs (1933)
- The Flower Girl from the Grand Hotel (1934)
- The Girlfriend of a Big Man (1934)
- The Lucky Diamond (1934)
- Frasquita (1934)
- A Woman Who Knows What She Wants (1934)
- The Gentleman Without a Residence (1934)
- Asew (1935)
- Heaven on Earth (1935)
- Circus Saran (1935)
- Eva (1935)
- Suburban Cabaret (1935)
- The Cossack and the Nightingale (1935)
- The Man with the Paw (1935)
- The White Horse Inn (1935)
- The Postman from Longjumeau (1936)
- The Fairy Doll (1936)
- Rendezvous in Vienna (1936)
- The Cabbie's Song (1936)
- Orders Are Orders (1936)
- The Missing Wife (1937)
- The Unexcused Hour (1937)
- The Optimist (1938)
- The Unfaithful Eckehart (1940)
- Everything for Gloria (1941)
- Alarm (1941)
- People in the Storm (1941)
- My Wife Teresa (1942)
- A Flea in Her Ear (1943)
- The Impostor (1944)
- Peter Voss, Thief of Millions (1946)
- Arlberg Express (1948)
- The Fourth Commandment (1950)
- No Sin on the Alpine Pastures (1950)
- The Landlady of Maria Wörth (1952)
- The First Kiss (1954)
- Her First Date (1955)
- Love, Summer and Music (1956)
- When the Bells Sound Clearly (1959)
- Romance in Venice (1962)

== Bibliography ==
- Kester, Bernadette. Film Front Weimar: Representations of the First World War in German films of the Weimar Period (1919-1933). Amsterdam University Press, 2003.
