= Anna Kallina =

Austrian actress (1874–1948)

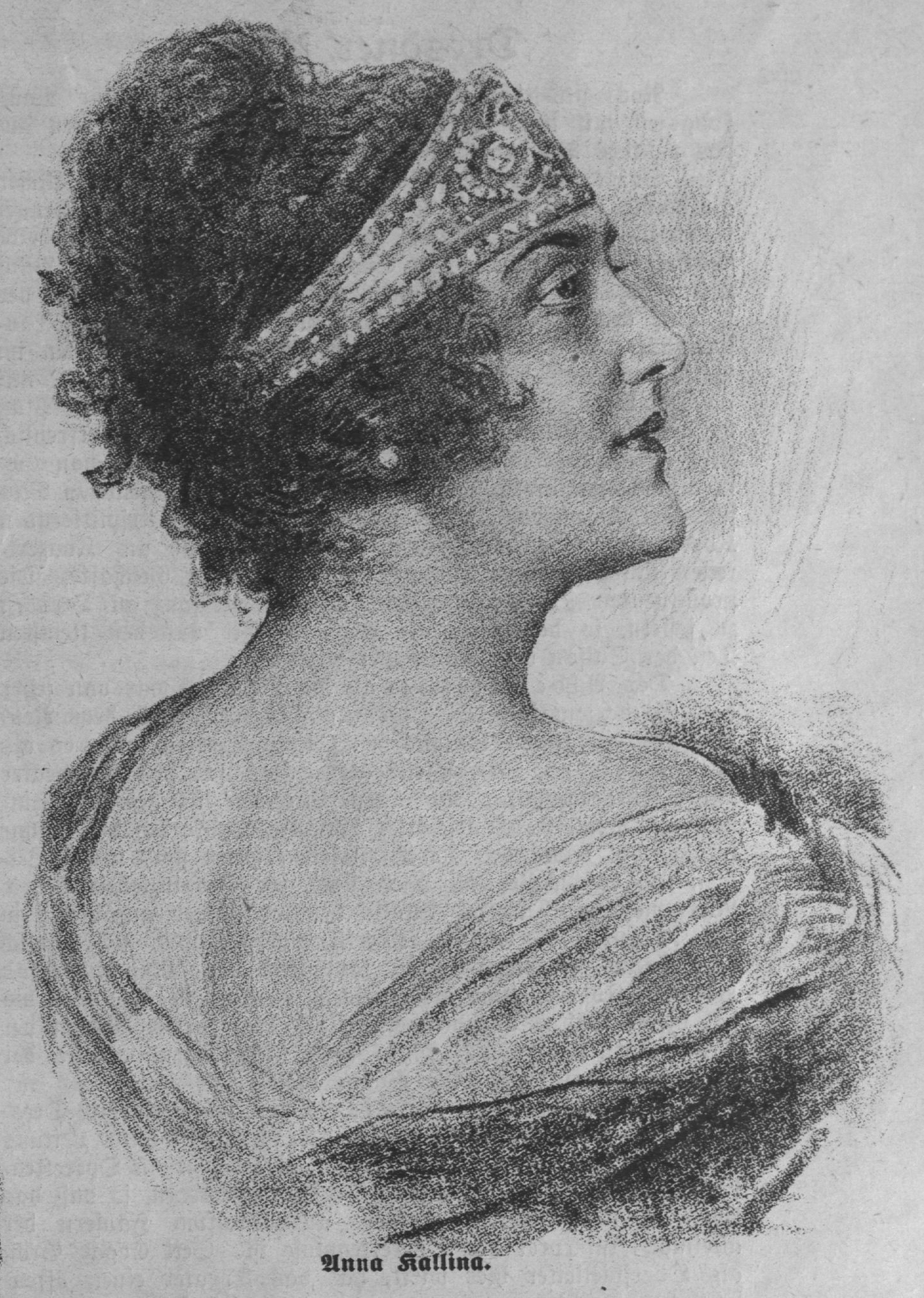
- A drawing of Kallina from 1925
- Born: 31 March 1874; Vienna, Austro-Hungarian Empire
- Died: 4 January 1948 (aged 73); Vienna, Austria
- Occupations: Film actor Stage actor
- Years active: 1919-1936 (film)

Anna Kallina (31 March 1874 – 4 January 1948) was an Austrian stage and film actress. She played the role of Anne, Queen of Great Britain, in the 1921 film The Grinning Face (1921).

Kallina first began acting on the state in the 1870s.

== Selected filmography ==
- Das grinsende Gesicht (1921)
- Die Totenhand (1921)
- Meriota the Dancer (1922)
- Look After Your Daughters (1922)
- The Right to Live (1927)
- The Family without Morals (1927)
- The Woman of Yesterday and Tomorrow (1928)
- Wiener Herzen (1930)
- Gently My Songs Entreat (1933)
- Lover Divine (1933)
- Her Highness Dances the Waltz (1935)
- The Affairs of Maupassant (1935)
- Where the Lark Sings (1936)

== Bibliography ==
- Gleizes, Delphine. L' oeuvre de Victor Hugo à l'écran: des rayons et des ombres. Presses Université Laval, 2005.
