= Adventures on the Lido =

1933 film directed by Richard Oswald

- Directed by: Richard Oswald
- Written by: Karl Farkas; Franz Schulz; Bedrich Wermuth
- Produced by: Leopold Meissner
- Starring: Alfred Piccaver: S.Z. Sakall; Nora Gregor
- Cinematography: Karl Puth; Hans Theyer
- Edited by: György Feld
- Music by: Bronislau Kaper
- Production company: Pan Film
- Distributed by: Atlantis Film
- Release date: 27 October 1933
- Running time: 91 minutes
- Country: Austria
- Language: German

Adventures on the Lido (German: Abenteuer am Lido) is a 1933 Austrian musical comedy film directed by Richard Oswald and starring Alfred Piccaver, S.Z. Sakall and Nora Gregor. It was shot at the Sievering Studios in Vienna and on location around Venice. The film's sets were designed by the art director Artur Berger. Because Oswald was a Jew, both this and another film of his were denied permission to be shown in Nazi Germany.

== Synopsis ==
After a scandal some years before singer Gennaro Mattei retired and went to live in a fishing village on the Adriatic. One day he rescues a young woman who is swimming and has run into trouble. A wealthy young American staying in Venice named Evelyn, she hears him singing and believes she has discovered a totally "new voice". Gennaro, attracted to the lively Evelyn, decides to play along with her idea of introducing him to the world as a major star. However, as his "debut" concert in Venice approaches he realises that she is actually smitten with the piano salesman Leonard.

== Cast ==
- Alfred Piccaver as Gennaro Mattei
- S.Z. Sakall as Michael
- Nora Gregor as Evelyn Norman
- Walter Rilla as Leonard
- Susi Lanner as Mitzi
- Hermine Sterler as Lucena
- John Mylong as Evelyn's admirer
- Eugen Jensen as Evelyn's admirer
- Teddy Bill as Eveleyn's admirer
- Eugen Neufeld as Konzertdirektor
- Robert Valberg as Bärtiger Professor
- Annie Rosar as woman at the restaurant
- Karl Skraup as Wirt

== Bibliography ==
- Kohl, Katrin & Robertson, Ritchie. A History of Austrian Literature 1918-2000. Camden House, 2006.
