= Hans Lackner =

Austrian actor (1876–1930)

- Born: 11 May 1876; Vienna, Austro-Hungarian Empire
- Died: 16 March 1930 (aged 53); Wiener Neustadt, Austria
- Occupation: Actor
- Years active: 1912–1929

Hans Lackner (11 May 1876 – 16 March 1930) was an Austrian stage and film actor.

== Selected filmography ==
- Bogdan Stimoff (1916)
- The Fool and Death (1920)
- Tales of Old Vienna (1923)
- The Little Sin (1923)
- Nameless (1924)
- The Girl Without a Homeland (1927)

== Bibliography ==
- Youngkin, Stephen. The Lost One: A Life of Peter Lorre. University Press of Kentucky, 2005.
