= Nora Gregor =

Austrian actress

- Nora Gregor in 1932
- Born: Eleonora Hermina Gregor; 3 February 1901; Görz, Austrian Littoral, Austria-Hungary (now in Italy)
- Died: 20 January 1949 (aged 47); Viña del Mar, Chile
- Years active: 1920–1945
- Spouse(s): Mitja Nikisch (ca. 1925 – ca. 1934); Ernst Ruediger, Prince von Starhemberg (1937–1949)

Nora Gregor (3 February 1901 – 20 January 1949) was an Austrian stage and film actress.

== Biography ==
She was born Eleonora Hermina Gregor in Görz, a town which then belonged to Austria-Hungary, but is now part of Italy, to Austrian-Jewish parents.

Her first husband was Mitja Nikisch, a pianist and son of celebrated orchestral conductor Arthur Nikisch. They divorced circa 1934.

In the mid-1930s, Gregor became the mistress of the married vice chancellor of Austria, the nationalist politician Prince Ernst Rüdiger von Starhemberg, with whom she had a son, Heinrich von Starhemberg (1934–1997). On 2 December 1937, five days after the prince's marriage to his first wife (the former Countess Marie-Elisabeth von Salm-Reifferscheidt-Raitz) was annulled, he and Gregor wed in Vienna.

In 1938, the Starhembergs emigrated to France through Switzerland, and her husband joined the French Army; cut off from their money and 80 family estates, they were supported for a period by Starhemberg's close friend Friedrich Mandl, the Austrian armaments magnate. In 1942, the Starhembergs moved to Argentina where they lived under humble circumstances. She was depressed by her exile to South America, and many sources claim her early death in Viña del Mar, Chile was a suicide. However, her biographer Hans Kitzmüller calls a suicide unlikely and notes that her death was probably from natural causes.

== Career ==
Gregor entered films in the early 1920s. She worked briefly in Hollywood during the early sound era, appearing in the foreign-language versions of films such as The Trial of Mary Dugan (1929) and His Glorious Night (1929). She was considered to be one of Austria's more popular film stars during this time, and she appeared as a stage actress at the famous Burgtheater.

During her French exile, Gregor played her most famous screen role as Christine de la Chesnaye in Jean Renoir's 1939 film La Règle du Jeu. Her last appearance was in the 1945 Chilean film La Fruta mordida.

== See also ==
- List of unsolved deaths

== Filmography ==
Year	Title	Role	Notes
1920	Gefesselt		
1920	Wie Satan starb		
1921	Das grinsende Gesicht	Herzogin Josiane	
1921	Die Schauspielerin des Kaisers		
1922	The Venus	Yvonne	
1922	Meriota the Dancer	Lukrezia Borgia	
1922	The Daughter of the Brigadier		
1922	The Separating Bridge		
1922	Der Mann, der das Lachen verlernte		
1923	Irrlichter der Tiefe		
1923	The Little Sin		
1924	Modern Vices		
1924	Mikaël	Fürstin Lucia Zamikoff	
1925	The Man Who Sold Himself	Daisy Bracca	
1925	The Girl with a Patron	Revuestar Orina Norowna	
1926	The Fiddler of Florence	Renées Stiefmutter	
1927	Eheskandal im Hause Fromont jun. und Risler sen.	Claire	
1930	Olympia	Olympia	
1931	The Murder Trial of Mary Dugan	Mary Dugan	
1931	That's All That Matters	Renée Roettlinck	
1931	Wir schalten um auf Hollywood	Herself	
1932	But the Flesh Is Weak	Mrs. Rosine Brown	
1933	What Women Dream	Rina Korff	
1933	Adventures on the Lido	Evelyn Norman	
1939	La règle du jeu	Christine de la Chesnaye	
1945	La Fruta mordida	La mère	final film role

== Names and Styles ==
- 1901 –ca. 1920: Fräulein Eleanora Gregor
- ca. 1925–ca.1934: Frau Mitja Nikisch (privately), Fräulein Nora Gregor (professionally)
- ca. 1934–1937: Fräulein Nora Gregor (professionally)
- 1937–1949: Her Most Serene Highness Princess von Starhemberg (privately; see Austrian nobility and Adelsaufhebungsgesetz), Fräulein Nora Gregor (professionally)
