= Meriota the Dancer =

1922 film directed by Julius Herzka

- Directed by: Julius Herska
- Written by: Louis Nerz
- Starring: Maria Mindzenty; Nora Gregor; Oscar Beregi Sr.
- Cinematography: Eduard Hoesch
- Production company: Olympia Film
- Release date: 27 January 1922
- Running time: 94 minutes
- Country: Austria
- Languages: Silent; German intertitles

Meriota the Dancer (German: Meriota, die Tänzerin) is a 1922 Austrian silent historical film directed by Julius Herska and starring Maria Mindzenty, Nora Gregor and Oscar Beregi Sr.

== Cast ==
- Maria Mindzenty as Meriota
- Nora Gregor as Lucrezia Borgia
- Oscar Beregi Sr. as Cesare Borgia
- Max Devrient as Pope Alexander VI
- Rudolf Bandler as Narr
- Victor Kutschera as Antonio Quirini
- Ferdinand Mayerhofer as Cecco, Wirt
- Susanne Osten as Teresa Quirini
- Norbert Schiller as Luigi Quirini
- Wilhelm Schmidt as Manrone Tosca
- Armin Seydelmann as Mateo Felice
- Hans Siebert as Pietro Campo
- Anna Kallina
- Hanns Kurth

== Bibliography ==
- Elisabeth Büttner & Christian Dewald. Das tägliche Brennen: eine Geschichte des österreichischen Films von den Anfängen bis 1945, Volume 1. Residenz, 2002.
