= The Man Who Laughs (1966 film) =

- US film poster
- Directed by: Sergio Corbucci
- Screenplay by: Filippo Sanjust; A. Issaverdens; A. Bertolotto; Luca Ronconi; Franco Rossetti; Sergio Corbucci; Dialogue: Giuseppe Patroni Griffi
- Based on: The Man Who Laughs; 1869 novel by Victor Hugo
- Produced by: Joseph Fryd
- Starring: Jean Sorel; Lisa Gastoni; Ilaria Occhini; Edmund Purdom
- Cinematography: Enzo Barboni
- Edited by: Mario Serandrei
- Music by: Carlo Savina
- Production companies: Sanson Film; Compagnie Internationale de Productions Cinématographiques
- Distributed by: Metro-Goldwyn-Mayer
- Release date: 3 February 1966
- Running time: 105 minutes
- Countries: Italy; France
- Language: Italian

The Man Who Laughs (Italian: L'uomo che ride) is a 1966 Italian historical drama film based on the 1869 novel of the same name by Victor Hugo.

== Plot ==
In this version, the character of Gwynplaine is renamed Angelo (played by Jean Sorel). His disfigurement is represented as a single broad slash across his mouth, crude yet convincing. While he deals with this, he also falls for a beautiful girl named Dea. The story (which is attributed, in the movie credits, to the director, producer and others involved in making the film, but not to Victor Hugo) has the disfigured acrobat being seduced by a noblewoman and in so doing becomes a henchman for the Borgias. Meanwhile, Dea miraculously acquires her eyesight and falls in love with a young nobleman. This nobleman is marked for death not just by Angelo's employers but by Angelo as well over the loss of Dea. Angelo's assassination attempt fails and he is mortally wounded. In the final scene the escaping Angelo staggers into a Leper Colony and falls dead.

== Cast ==
- Lisa Gastoni - Lucrezia Borgia
- Jean Sorel - Angelo Bello / Astorre Manfredi
- Edmund Purdom - Cesare Borgia
- Ilaria Occhini - Dea
- Nando Poggi - Umberto
- Pierre Clémenti
- Gianni Musy
- Linda Sini
