= Robert Valberg =

Austrian actor

Robert Valberg (28 April 1884 – 15 October 1955) was an Austrian stage and film actor.

== Selected filmography ==
- The Traitress (1911)
- Ivan Koschula (1914)
- The Silent Mill (1914)
- Laugh Bajazzo (1915)
- Money in the Streets (1922)
- The Tales of Hoffmann (1923)
- A Waltz by Strauss (1925)
- Colonel Redl (1925)
- The Arsonists of Europe (1926)
- Grandstand for General Staff (1926)
- The Girl Without a Homeland (1927)
- Huragan (1928)
- Adventures on the Lido (1933)
- Our Emperor (1933)
- Frasquita (1934)
- The Emperor's Candlesticks (1936)
- Where the Lark Sings (1936)
- The Love of the Maharaja (1936)
- His Daughter is Called Peter (1936)
- Thank You, Madame (1936)
- Manja Valewska (1936)
- Romance (1936)
- The Charm of La Boheme (1937)
- Premiere (1937)
- Mirror of Life (1938)
- Linen from Ireland (1939)
- Hotel Sacher (1939)
- Seven Years Hard Luck (1940)
- Maria Theresa (1951)

== Bibliography ==
- Kester, Bernadette. Film Front Weimar: Representations of the First World War in German films of the Weimar Period (1919-1933). Amsterdam University Press, 2003.
