= In Thrall to the Claw =

1921 film directed by Carl Froelich

- Directed by: Carl Froelich
- Written by: Leo Kronau; Willy Rath
- Produced by: Carl Froelich; Georg Wilhelm Pabst
- Starring: Eugen Jensen; Gustav Diessl
- Cinematography: Otto Kanturek
- Production company: Dreamland-Film
- Release date: 1921 (Austria)
- Country: Austria
- Languages: Silent; German intertitles

In Thrall to the Claw (German: Im Banne der Kralle) is a 1921 Austrian silent film directed by Carl Froelich and starring Eugen Jensen, Gustav Diessl, and Julius Strobl. While visiting the set, future director Georg Wilhelm Pabst made his only ever screen appearance as an actor.

The film's sets were designed by the art director Jacek Rotmil.

== Cast ==
- Eugen Jensen
- Gustav Diessl as Ingenieur
- Julius Strobl
- Emil Mamelok
- Lona Schmidt
- Cläre Lotto
- Valerie von Martens
- Stella Kadmon
- Elise Markl
- Georg Wilhelm Pabst
- Hans von Strobl
- Gustav Waldau

== Bibliography ==
- Bock, Hans-Michael; Bergfelder, Tim, eds. (2009). The Concise Cinegraph: Encyclopaedia of German Cinema. New York: Berghahn Books. ISBN 978-1-57181-655-9.
