= Colonel Redl (1925 film) =

1925 film directed by Hans Otto

- Directed by: Hans Otto
- Written by: Hans Otto; Walter Reisch; Hans Seeliger
- Starring: Robert Valberg; Eugen Neufeld; Dagny Servaes
- Cinematography: Eduard Hoesch
- Music by: Björn Maseng
- Production companies: FIAG-Filmindustrie; Ottol-Film
- Release date: 20 February 1925
- Running time: 112 minutes
- Country: Austria
- Languages: Silent; German intertitles

Colonel Redl (German: Oberst Redl) is a 1925 Austrian silent drama film directed by Hans Otto and starring Robert Valberg, Eugen Neufeld and Harry Norbert. It portrays the career of the Austrian Army Officer Alfred Redl, exposed as a foreign agent shortly before the First World War.

== Cast ==
- Robert Valberg as Oberst Alfred Redl
- Eugen Neufeld as Oberst Ullmanitzky
- Harry Norbert as Oberstleutnant Jamischewicz
- Albert von Kersten as Major Wierenkoff
- Eugen Dumont as Kriegsminister Rußlands
- Dagny Servaes as Sonja Uraskow
- Ellen Reith as Hauptmann Erdmann's Braut
- Carlos Gerspach as Hauptmann Erdmann
- Louis Seeman as Gendarmerieoberst Boreff
- Julius Stärk as Auditor
- Mella Baffa
- Louis Erdmann

== Bibliography ==
- Deborah Holmes & Lisa Silverman. Interwar Vienna: Culture Between Tradition and Modernity. Camden House, 2009.
