= The Separating Bridge =

1922 film directed by Julius Herzka

- Directed by: Julius Herska
- Written by: Julius Ludassy (novel)
- Starring: Maria Mindzenty; Nora Gregor; Eugen Jensen
- Cinematography: Eduard Hoesch
- Production company: Olympic-Film
- Release date: 18 April 1922
- Country: Austria
- Languages: Silent; German intertitles

The Separating Bridge (German: Die trennende Brücke) is a 1922 Austrian silent film directed by Julius Herska and starring Maria Mindzenty, Nora Gregor and Eugen Jensen.

== Cast ==
- Maria Mindzenty
- Nora Gregor
- Eugen Jensen
- Josef Becker
- Emil Bittner
- Viktor Flemmig
- Julius Klinkowström
- Maria Ley
- Charlotte Pohl
- Marietta Weber
- Theodor Weiß

== Bibliography ==
- Elisabeth Büttner & Christian Dewald. Das tägliche Brennen: eine Geschichte des österreichischen Films von den Anfängen bis 1945, Volume 1. Residenz, 2002.
