= The Little Sin =

1923 film directed by Julius Herzka

- Directed by: Julius Herska
- Written by: Julius Ludassy
- Starring: Nora Gregor; Anny Eversa; Senta Stillmark
- Cinematography: Eduard Hoesch
- Production company: Olympic-Film
- Release date: 7 July 1923
- Country: Austria
- Languages: Silent; German intertitles

The Little Sin (German: Die kleine Sünde) is a 1923 Austrian silent film directed by Julius Herska and starring Nora Gregor, Anny Eversa and Senta Stillmark.

== Cast ==
- Nora Gregor
- Anny Eversa
- Senta Stillmark
- Hans Lackner
- Viktor Flemmig

== Bibliography ==
- Rudolf Ulrich. Österreicher in Hollywood: ihr Beitrag zur Entwicklung des amerikanischen Films. 1993.
