= The Man Who Laughs (2012 film) =

- Film poster
- French: L'homme qui rit
- Directed by: Jean-Pierre Améris
- Written by: Jean-Pierre Améris; Guillaume Laurant
- Based on: The Man Who Laughs; 1869 novel by Victor Hugo
- Produced by: Thomas Anargyros; Edouard de Vésinne
- Starring: Gérard Depardieu; Marc-André Grondin; Christa Théret; Arben Bajraktaraj; Serge Merlin; Emmanuelle Seigner
- Cinematography: Gérard Simon
- Edited by: Philippe Bourgueil
- Music by: Stéphane Moucha
- Production company: EuropaCorp
- Distributed by: EuropaCorp
- Release dates: 2 September 2012 (VFF); 26 December 2012 (France, Belgium)
- Running time: 95 minutes
- Country: France
- Language: French

The Man Who Laughs (French: L'homme qui rit) is a 2012 French period romantic drama film based on the 1869 eponymous novel by Victor Hugo, directed by Jean-Pierre Améris and starring Marc-André Grondin, Christa Théret and Gérard Depardieu.

Produced by EuropaCorp, the film received mixed reviews and was unsuccessful at the box-office.

== Synopsis ==
In a unspecified country in 17th-century Europe, Ursus, a travelling showman, finds two abandoned children in the middle of a winter storm. The boy, Gwynplaine, has had his mouth mutilated into a perpetual grin and the girl, Dea, is blind. Ursus takes in and raises the two children. Gwynplaine and Dea grow up and fall in love. They travel the roads with Ursus, giving a show in which Gwynplaine becomes the star. As their show is more and more successful and the "Man who laughs" becomes a sensation, Gwynplaine gains the opportunity to join high society and discover the secret of his origins. But as he does so, he drifts apart from Dea and Ursus.

== Cast ==
- Marc-André Grondin as Gwynplaine
  - Romain Morelli as young Gwynplaine
- Christa Théret as Dea
  - Fanie Zanini as young Dea
- Gérard Depardieu as Ursus
- Arben Bajraktaraj as Hardquanone
- Emmanuelle Seigner as Duchess Josiane
- Serge Merlin as Barkilphedro
- Swann Arlaud as Sylvain
- Christèle Tual as Clémence
- Brice Fournier as Combarel
- Vincent de Boüard as magistrate
- Věra Kubánková as lady at court

== Production ==
Director Jean-Pierre Améris had the idea of adapting Victor Hugo's novel after watching a French television adaptation as a child, and later reading the book as a teenager.

Filming began in January 2012 at the Barrandov Studios in Prague, Czech Republic.

== Release ==
The film premiered in September 2012 at the 69th Venice International Film Festival. It was released theatrically in France on 26 December 2012.

== Reception ==
Boyd Van Hoeij from Variety was critical of the film, writing, "Less faithful to its source material and more concerned with delivering the goods visually, this handsome, studio-shot pic, somewhat ironically, lacks genuine pathos in telling its tale of how deceiving looks can be." Neil Young from The Hollywood Reporter gave it a positive review, writing, "Thoroughly old-fashioned but ultimately moving literary adaptation has more than enough exploitable features to indicate long-term commercial success." Jacques Mandelbaum of Le Monde reviewed the film negatively, finding it a lackluster, if respectful, adaptation of Hugo's novel and noting that it seemed unable to choose between a conventional narrative and overwrought "Hollywoodian" gothic visuals.

In December 2012, one of the film's lead actors, Gérard Depardieu, became embroiled in a controversy regarding his tax exile in Belgium. After being publicly criticized by the French government for his tax avoidance move, Depardieu announced that he would give up his French passport. Russian President Vladimir Putin then offered Depardieu citizenship and tax residence in Russia, which the actor accepted. The film was released theatrically in France in the midst of the affair, and bombed at the box-office. Améris acknowledged that the controversy surrounding Depardieu had significantly hurt the film's release in France. According to Améris, some theater owners even refused to show the film as part of the backlash against Depardieu.

== Home media ==
The film was released on DVD in 2013. It was later released on streaming on Canal+.
