= Julius Herska =

Austrian actor and director

- Born: 1 October 1859; Pest, Austrian Empire
- Died: 22 October 1925 (aged 66); Brno, Czechoslovakia
- Occupations: Actor, Director
- Years active: 1921-1923 (film)

Julius Herska or Julius Herzka (1859–1925) was an Austrian stage actor and director. He also directed eight films during the silent era including the Victor Hugo adaptation Das grinsende Gesicht.

== Selected filmography ==
- Das grinsende Gesicht (1921)
- Meriota the Dancer (1922)
- The Separating Bridge (1922)
- The Little Sin (1923)

== Bibliography ==
- John T. Soister & Henry Nicolella. Down from the Attic: Rare Thrillers of the Silent Era through the 1950s. McFarland, 2016.
