= Franz Höbling =

Austrian actor and film director

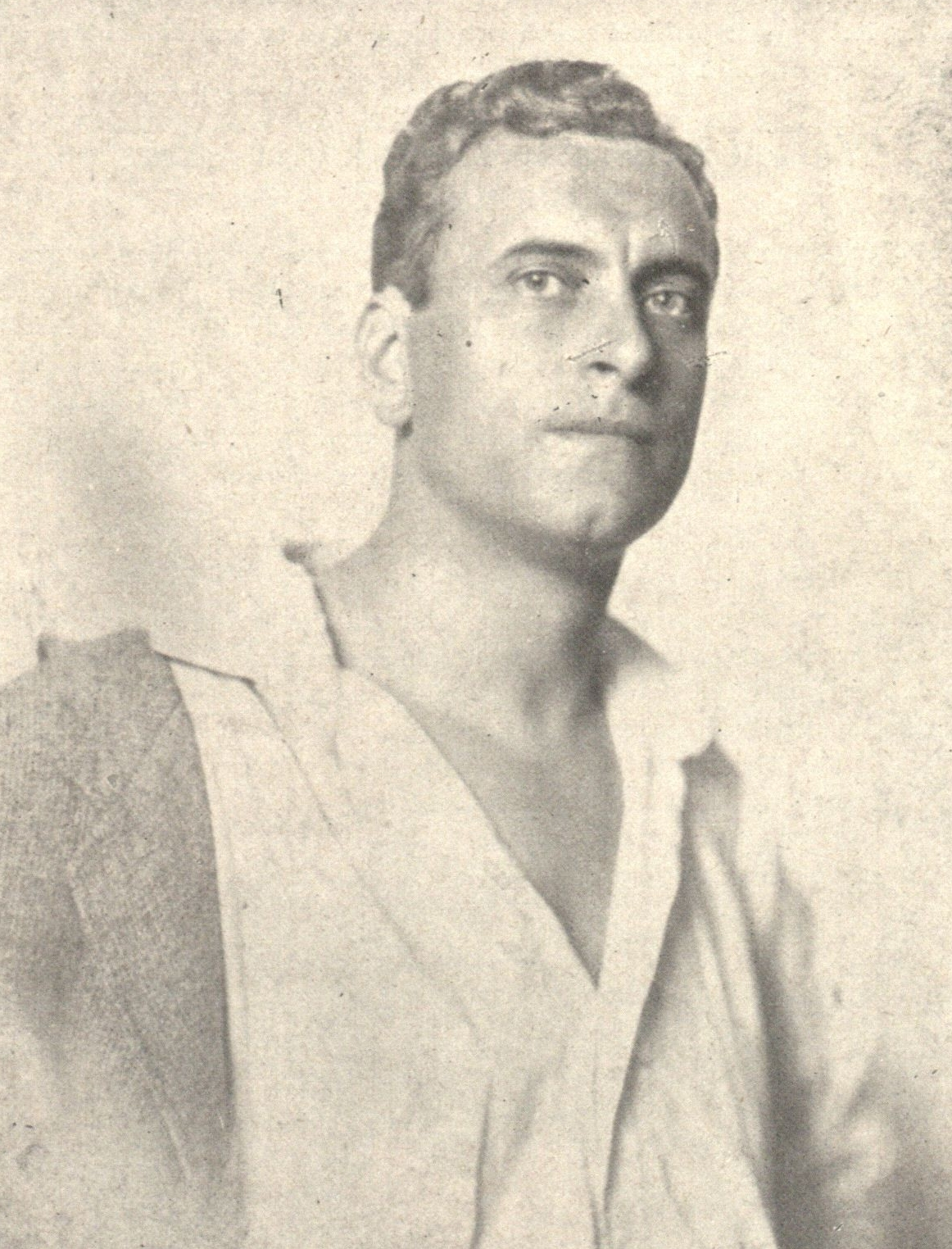
- Franz Höbling in 1918.
- Born: 9 September 1886; Vienna, Austro-Hungarian Empire
- Died: 14 February 1965 (aged 78); Vienna, Austria
- Occupation: Film director
- Years active: 1915–1923 (film)

Franz Höbling (1886 – 1965) was an Austrian actor and film director. He played the lead in the 1921 silent horror film Das grinsende Gesicht (1921). He co-starred several times with Magda Sonja.

== Selected filmography ==
=== Actor ===
- The Jewess of Toledo (1919)
- Der Traum im Walde (1919)
- Das grinsende Gesicht (1921)
- Der hinkende Teufel (1922)
- Look After Your Daughters (1922)

== Bibliography ==
- Barker, Clive. Clive Barker's A–Z of Horror. BBC Books, 1997.
