= Das grinsende Gesicht =

1921 film directed by Julius Herzka

- Film poster
- Directed by: Julius Herzka
- Screenplay by: Louis Nerz
- Based on: The Man Who Laughs by Victor Hugo
- Starring: Franz Höbling; Nora Gregor; Lucienne Delacroix; Anna Kallina
- Cinematography: Eduard Hoesch
- Production company: Olympic-Film
- Release date: March 18, 1921
- Running time: 2,200 meters
- Country: Austria

Das grinsende Gesicht (transl. The Grinning Face) is a 1921 Austrian film silent film directed by Julius Herzka. It stars Anna Kallina, Nora Gregor and Lucienne Delacroix. It is the first feature film adaptation of Victor Hugo's 1869 novel The Man Who Laughs.

== Plot ==
In the late 17th century in France, the young son of a widowed lord is kidnapped by gypsies, who carve a permanent grin on the child's face. When the disfigured youth (Franz Hobling) grows up, he falls in love with a blind girl named Dea (Lucienne Delacroix), and joins a touring company as a performer. Calling himself Gwynplaine, he develops an act in which he reveals his hideous face to the crowds for money. A sexually perverse, seductive socialite named Josiane becomes attracted to him and seeks to possess him. He later learns he is heir to a fortune, but chooses instead to remain with his adopted family.

== Cast ==
Cast according to Down from the Attic: Rare Thrillers of the Silent Era through the 1950s (2016).

- Anna Kallina as Queen Anne
- Nora Gregor as Duchess Josianne
- Jimmy Court as Lord David Dirry-Moir
- Armin Seydelmann as Lord Boilingborke
- Franz Höbling as Gwynplaine
- Lucienne Delacroix as Dea

== Production ==
Das grinsende Gesicht was a production of the small Austrian film company Olympic-Film. It is the second movie adaption, but the first feature film adaptation of Victor Hugo's novel The Man Who Laughs (1869). The director was Julius Herzka, who directed operas and plays and only a few films.

== Release and reception ==
Das grinsende Gesicht had a trade preview screening in Vienna on October 22, 1920, and a general release on March 18, 1921 before going in distribution in Austria and Germany. It had limited international distribution, being screened in Havana in October 1921 when it was imported by the Antillian Film Co.

From retrospective reviews, the authors of Down from the Attic: Rare Thrillers of the Silent Era through the 1950s (2016) describe the film as "an earnest and faithful - though somewhat uninspired" adaptation.

== See also ==
- Cinema of Austria
- List of Austrian films of the 1920s

== Bibliography ==
- "Das grinsende Gesicht". Filmportal.de. Archived from the original on 17 March 2014.
- Prince, Stephen (2004). The Horror Film. Rutgers University Press.
- Soister, John T.; Nicolella, Henry (2016). Down from the Attic: Rare Thrillers of the Silent Era through the 1950s. McFarland and Company, Inc. ISBN 978-0-7864-9831-4.
