= Kleider machen Leute =

Kleider machen Leute may refer to:

- Kleider machen Leute (novella), a short novel by Gottfried Keller
- Kleider machen Leute (film), a 1940 German film by director Helmut Käutner
- Kleider machen Leute (opera), an opera by Alexander Zemlinsky
- Kleider machen Leute (Suder), an opera by Joseph Suder

== See also ==
- Clothes Make the Man (disambiguation) (English for Kleider machen Leute)
