= Seldwyla Folks =

Sequence of novellas by Gottfried Keller

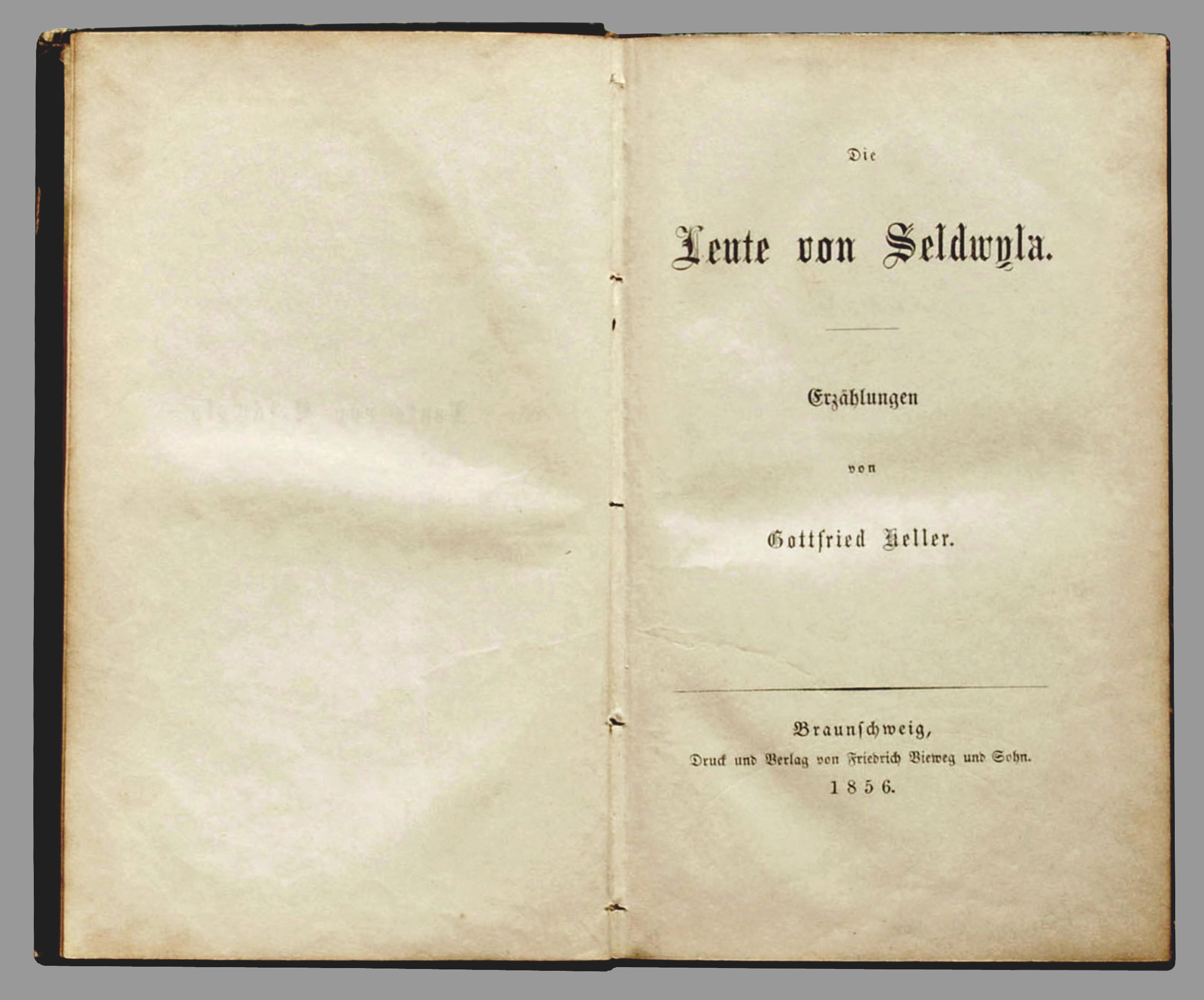
Title page from the first edition, 1856

Seldwyla Folks, also published as The People of Seldwyla (German: Die Leute von Seldwyla), is a sequence of novellas by the Swiss writer Gottfried Keller. The ten stories are set around the fictional small town of Seldwyla in Switzerland. Each story is about an obsession or fixation that leads to excess, bigotry or self-indulgence.

The first five stories were written from 1853 to 1855 and published together in 1856. The second half was written from 1860 to 1875, while the finished sequence was published together from 1873 to 1875.

== Stories ==
1. "Pankraz the Sulker" (German: Pankraz, der Schmoller)
2. "A Village Romeo and Juliet" (German: Romeo und Julia auf dem Dorfe)
3. "Regula Amrain and Her Youngest Son" (German: Frau Regel Amrain und ihr Jüngster)
4. "Three Decent Combmakers" (German: Die drei gerechten Kammmacher)
5. "Spiegel the Cat" (German: Spiegel, das Kätzchen)
6. "Clothes Make the Man" (German: Kleider machen Leute)
7. "The Smith of His Own Fortune" (German: Der Schmied seines Glückes)
8. "The Misused Love Letters" (German: Die mißbrauchten Liebesbriefe)
9. "Dietegen"
10. "The Lost Laugh" (German: Das verlorne Lachen)

== Selected adaptations ==
- A Village Romeo and Juliet, 1907 opera composed by Frederick Delius
- Kleider machen Leute, 1910 opera composed by Alexander von Zemlinsky
- Clothes Make the Man, 1921 Austrian-German film
- Kleider machen Leute, 1934 opera composed by Joseph Suder
- Clothes Make the Man, 1940 German film
- Spiegel the Cat, 1952 Australian radio play
