= Thimig =

Thimig is a German surname, principally associated with an Austrian theatrical family:

- Hans Emil Thimig (1900–1991), son of Hugo Thimig, Austrian stage and film actor
- Helene Thimig (1889–1974), daughter of Hugo Thimig, wife of Max Reinhardt
- Hermann Thimig (1890–1982), son of Hugo Thimig, Austrian stage and film actor
- Hugo August Thimig (1854–1944), actor in Vienna and director of the Burgtheater
