= Clothes Make the Man (disambiguation) =

Clothes Make the Man is a 1915 American film featuring Oliver Hardy.

Clothes Make the Man may also refer to:

- Clothes Make the Man (1921 film), an Austrian-German silent film
- Clothes Make the Man (1940 film), a 1940 German historical comedy film
- "Clothes Make the Man", a song from the 1972 animated television special The Enchanted World of Danny Kaye

== See also ==
- Kelider machen Leute (novella) (transl. Clothes Make the Man), a short story on which the 1915, 1921 and 1940 films are based
- Kleider machen Leute (disambiguation) (transl. Clothes Make the Man)
- Clothes Make the Woman, a 1928 American silent historical romantic drama film
