= Clothes Make the Man (novella) =

Clothes Make the Man (German: Kleider machen Leute) is a German-language short story or novella by Gottfried Keller. The story comes from Keller's cycle of novellas The People from Seldwyla (Die Leute von Seldwyla) and first appeared in 1874 in the third volume of the second edition of Keller's cycle. The plot concerns Wenzel, a penniless tailor of Seldwyla who—because of the luxurious suit he has made for himself—is mistaken for a young lord when arriving at the fictional town of Goldach. The tailor is feted by the townsfolk and attracts the attention of a high-born young woman, Nettchen.

== Adaptations ==
- 1910 opera by Zemlinsky
- 1921 silent film by Hans Steinhoff with Hermann Thimig as the tailor, Dora Kaiser as Nettchen, and Hugo Thimig as landlord of the inn.
- 1934 opera by Suder
- 1940 film, with Heinz Rühmann as Wenzel and Hertha Feiler as Nettchen
- 1963 German TV movie directed by Paul Verhoeven - starring Hanns Lothar as Wenzel Graf and Monika Peitsch as Nettchen.
