= Peter Roleff =

German ballet dancer, choreographer and dance teacher (1906 – 1994)

Peter Roleff (December 18, 1906, in Quadrath-Ichendorf – March 21, 1994, in Neubeuern) was a German ballet dancer, choreographer and dance teacher.

== Biography ==
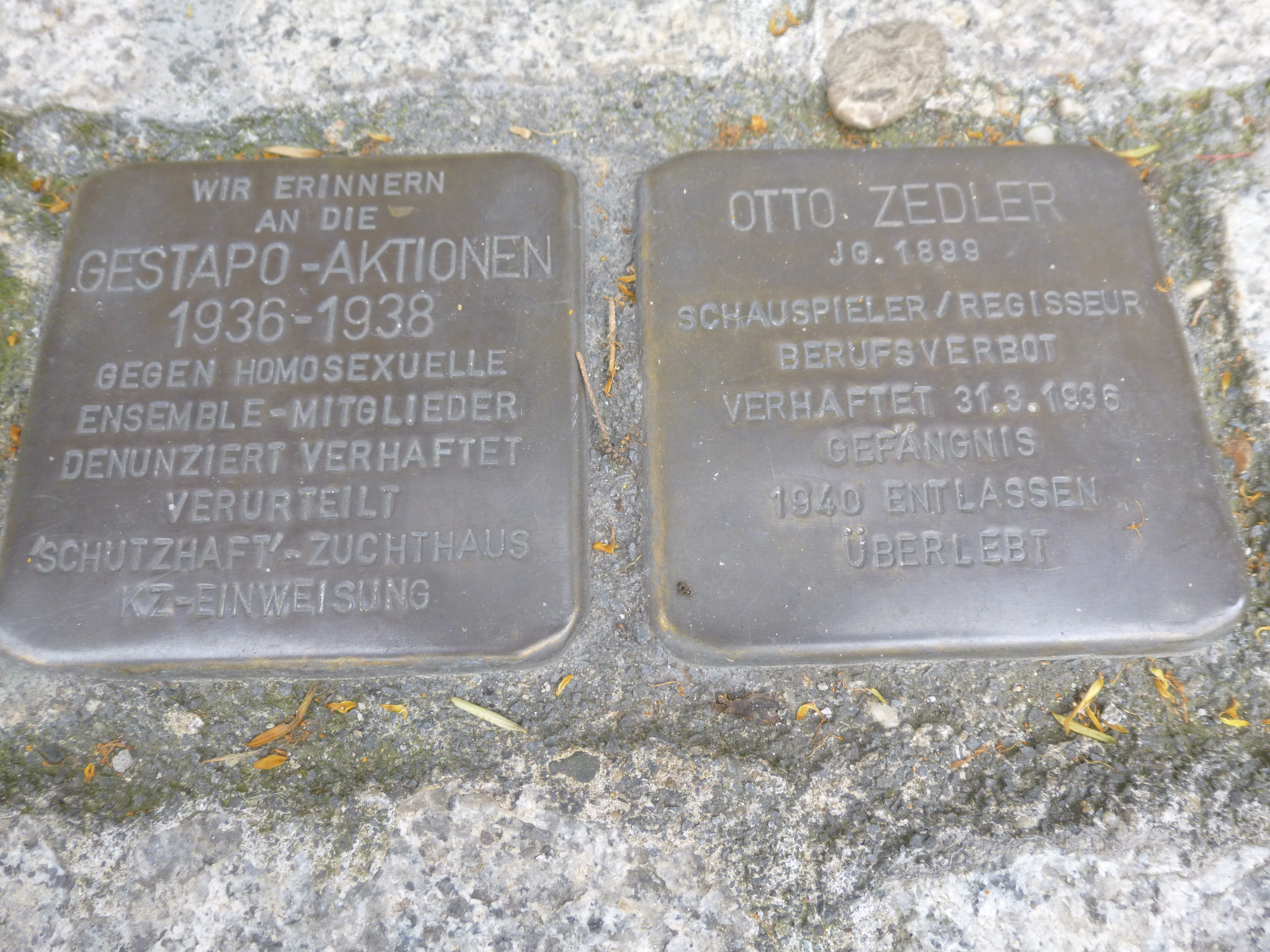
Stumbling blocks at the Grillo Theater in Essen to commemorate the persecution

Roleff studied with Victor Gsovsky and Berthold Schmid in Berlin. He debuted as a dancer with Lizzie Maudrik at the Städtische Oper Berlin, and then went to the theaters in Augsburg (1931) and Essen (1932). Starting in 1935, he worked as a freelance choreographer and ballet teacher in Berlin.

During the Nazi era, Roleff was arrested as a homosexual on March 23, 1936, for violating Paragraph 175, and sentenced to two years in prison by the Essen Regional Court on September 25, 1936.

After the war, Roleff worked as a ballet master and soloist at the Theater Wiesbaden in the 1946–47 season, then as a freelancer in Cologne and as director of the Cologne Tanzbrunnen Ballet from 1948 to 1951. He was then ballet master at the theaters in Bonn from 1951 to 1953 –56 in Bielefeld. Here he choreographed the premieres of Bernd Alois Zimmermann's Contrasts and Alagoana (1954).

In 1956, Roleff founded his ballet school in Munich with the dancer Karl-Heinz King, which still exists today under the name “Ballet Academy Roleff-King”.

Roleff appeared in the films The Congress Dances, Clothes Make the Man and The Post Leaves. His ballet Diana Sorpresa (music by Harald Banter) was broadcast on German television in 1960. Roleff's estate is in the German Dance Archive in Cologne.

== Bibliography ==
- Horst Koegler and Helmut Günther: Reclam's ballet lexicon. Philipp Reclam Jr., Stuttgart 1984, p. 377.
- Bernd-Ulrich Hergemöller (ed.): Man for Man - Biographical Lexicon. On the history of love between friends and male sexuality in the German-speaking world. Vol. 2, Lit Verlag, Berlin 2010, ISBN 978-3-643-10693-3, pp. 991–992.
