= Indlamu (disambiguation) =

Indlamu denotes several items:

- Indlamu (dress), the traditional short beaded skirt of young Swazi maidens during the Umhlanga (Reed Dance).
- Indlamu (dance) (Zoeloedans), traditional dance of the Zulu people of South Africa

as well as

- Indlamu (Zulu), clan of the Zulu people
- Indlamu (Ndebele), tribe of the Ndebele of Simbabwe
