= Helmut Günther =

German dance historian

Helmut Günther (4 August 1911 – 17 February 1983) was a German dancer, dance historian, and dance critic. He researched historic and contemporary African dances and introduced a novel approach to study them. He also worked in the field of sociology of dance and jazz dance. His works are frequently cited in literature relating to history of culture of Africa, particularly African dances.

== Life ==
Born in Michelfeld, Günther studied history, German, English, comparative linguistics and philosophy in Tübingen and Bristol. Afterwards he worked as a teacher and later as a councillor of studies in Neckarsulm and Stuttgart. Günther had come to folk dance as a member of the Sozialistische Arbeiter-Jugend, later also to social dance and dancesport. He also took ballet lessons at Albert Burger's school in Stuttgart. He first published on social dance, then increasingly on jazz dance and on non-Western dance cultures. He was the only dance expert to create terminology to deal with African dance featured. His numerous publications in professional journals, in the Stuttgarter Zeitung, Die Zeit and on radio also include his research on Albert Burger's collaboration with Oskar Schlemmer at the Triadic Ballet. At Stuttgart's John Cranko Schule, he taught dance history for a time.

Günther died in Stuttgart at the age of 71. Günther's estate is preserved in the Deutsches Tanzarchiv Köln.

== Research ==
Günther's research focused on translating African and Afro-American dances into literary descriptions, similar to scholarly works that discuss European dances. Günther documented challenges of doing so in a Euro-centric manner since both dances differed in their fundamentals. He wrote in his 1969 book that African and Afro-American dances tend to emphasize movements of different parts of the body, mostly independently from one another; this was in contrast to most European forms of dance, in which the body is viewed as a single entity. Günther hence described dances of Africa as "polycentric", where multiple "centers" (parts) of the body function independently, and that their different combinations lead to a more complex system of dance. He found that location of those motion centers generally corresponded with placement of ornaments, decoration, and clothing on the body; he further added that analysis of objects on the body could help in determining which centers would be involved in polyrhythmic movements. Günther theorized that body parts were painted with colors in African dances to highlight their movements more prominently; he described those body markings as "dance signals".

Against contemporary theories of the time, Günther and Helmut Schäfer argued that movements in African dances are "precise" and follow specific laws, and that they focus on "absolute control over muscles". A. M. Dauer praised Günther's analytical approach to African dances, and said that his work was a "convincing experiment in putting the complex matter of African and African-derived dancing into a plausible and communicable system of nomenclature". While G. T. Nurse appreciated his "competent treatment of the details of bodily motions", they reviewed his works negatively with regards to aesthetics, stating that Günther's theories "lack a sense of reality of the dance, any hint that it can be enjoyable to watch or perform".

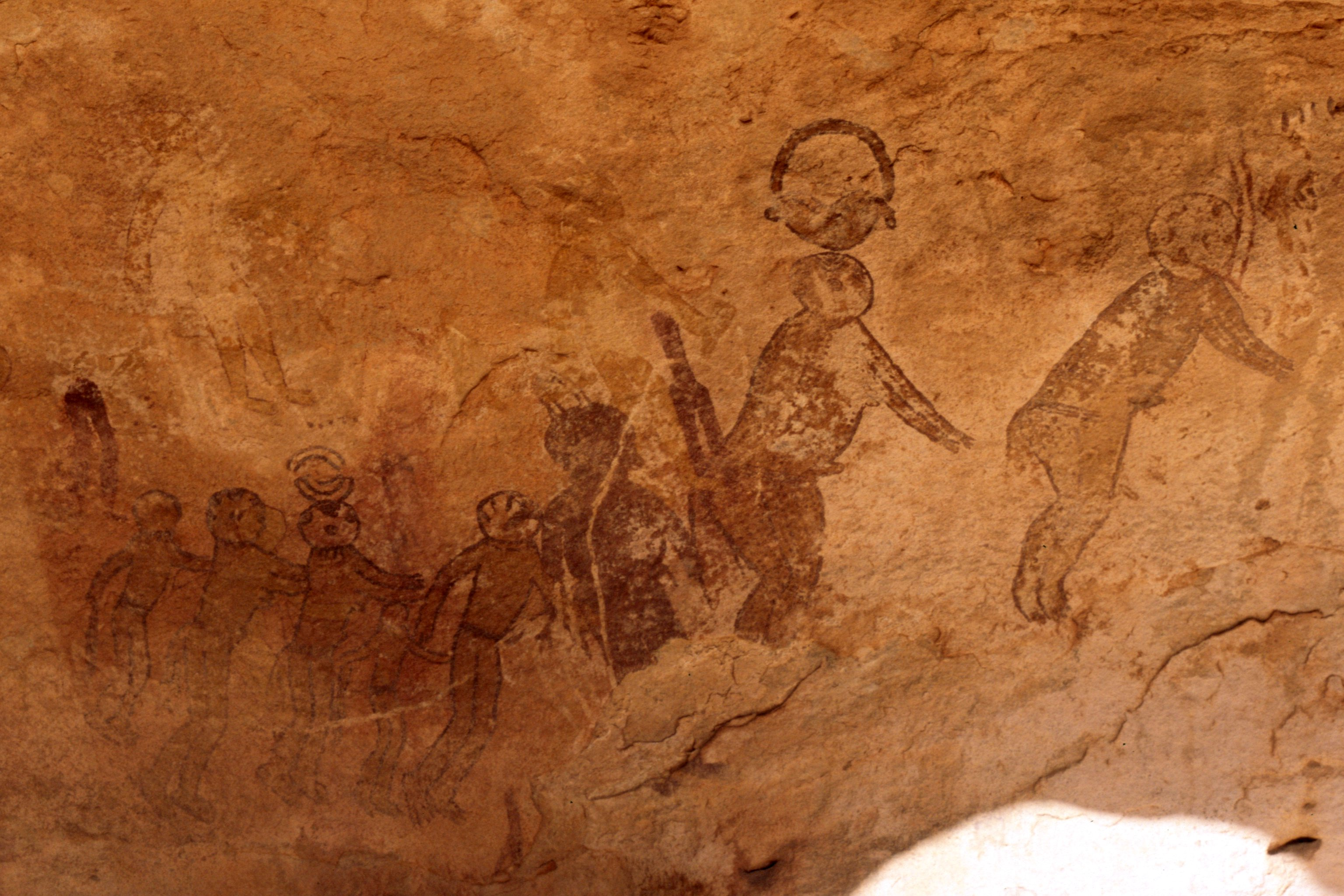
Eight dancers of the Tassili n'Ajjer rock art.

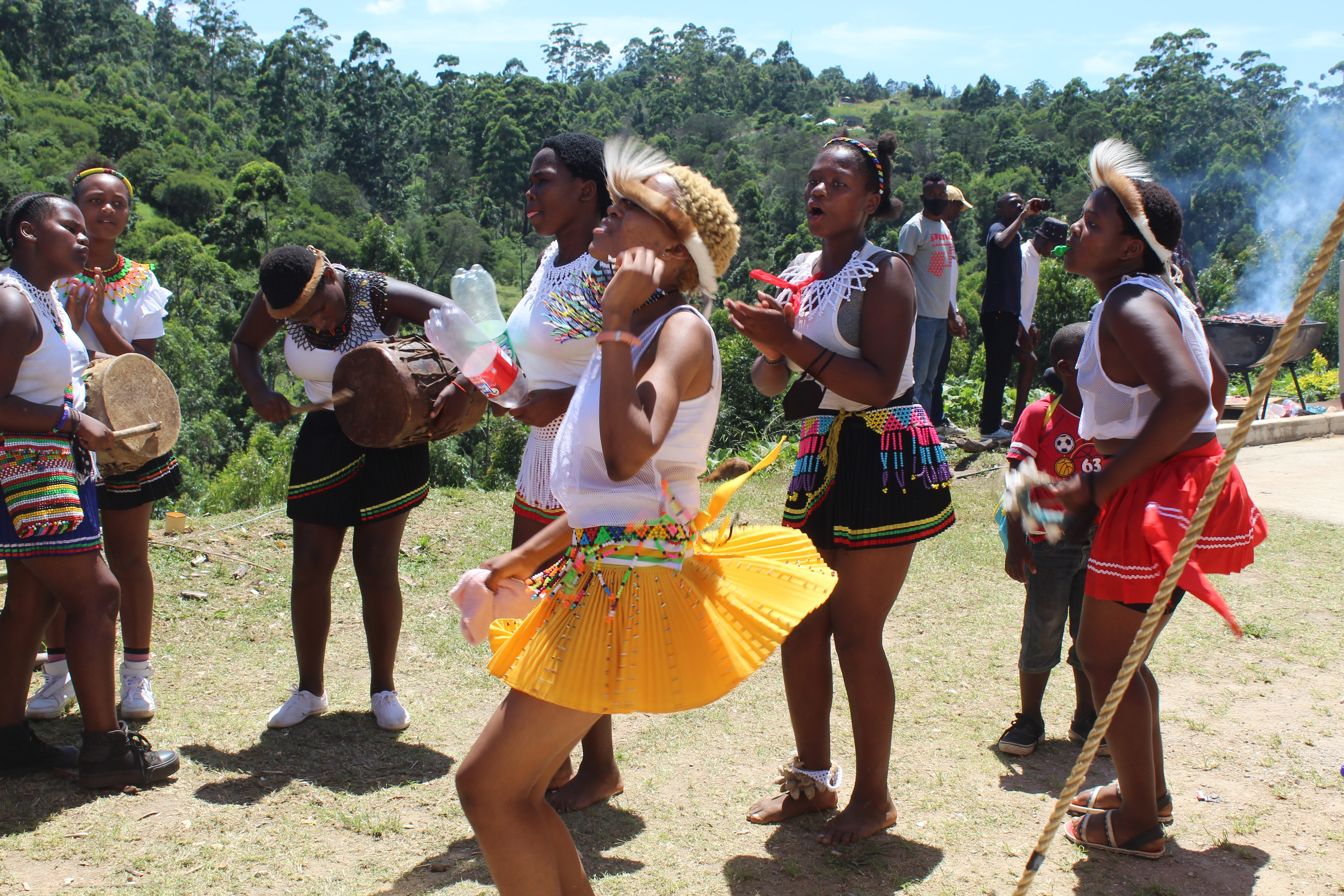
Indlamu, a contemporary Zulu dance.

Günther researched contemporary African dances. He documented introduction and influence of rumba in African culture after 1930, and its popularization after 1945. Günther suggested that a rock art discovered by Henri Lhote in Tassili n'Ajjer depicting eight dancers from 6000–4000 BC featured similarities to a contemporary Zulu dance, called indlamu.

In his 1975 book, Günther was disapproving of how rhythmic gymnastics had become a part of mainstream educational curriculum in Germany; he suggested that it was turning into a dance form which was "only for women, children and the sick". Performance philosopher Laura Cull Ó Maoilearca was critical of Günther's characterization, and presented a counterargument that "women of [rhythmic] gymnastics established a new form of practical reasoning", in that "each individual's own 'inner' rhythm must be developed on the basis of his or her particular needs". She further explained the changes by citing that women historically were unable to participate in the sport as freely, and that the then-prevailing philosophy of the sport was unduly male-centric.

== Work ==
- (with Helmut Schäfer): Vom Schamanentanz zur Rumba. Die Geschichte des Gesellschaftstanzes. Ifland, Stuttgart 1959, 3rd edition. 1993. ISBN 3-87372-029-9
- Grundphänomene und Grundbegriffe des afrikanischen und afro-amerikanischen Tanzes. Universal-Edition, Graz 1969, 3rd edition 1977. OCLC 581418
- Günther, Helmut (1991). Tanzunterricht in Deutschland eine kultursoziologische Studie (in German). Remscheid. ISBN 978-3-925318-19-1. OCLC 75305299.
- (with Hubert Haag): Vom Rock'n Roll bis Soul. Die modernen Poptänze von 1954 bis 1976. Hepp, Ostfildern-Nellingen 1976. OCLC 174498415
- Die Tänze und Riten der Afro-Amerikaner. Verlag Dance Motion, Bonn 1982. ISBN 978-3-7959-0445-6
- (with Horst Koegler, ed.): Reclams Ballettlexikon. Philipp Reclam jun., Stuttgart 1984. ISBN 3-15-010328-2
- Jazz dance: Geschichte, Theorie, Praxis (in German) [Jazz dance: history, theory, practice], Henschelverlag, Berlin 1980, 4th edition 1990. ISBN 978-3-89487-498-8 – Heinrichshofen 1982, Wilhelmshaven 3rd edition
