= Clothes Make the Man (1921 film) =

1921 film

- German: Kleider machen Leute
- Directed by: Hans Steinhoff
- Written by: Hans Steinhoff
- Starring: Hermann Thimig; Dora Kaiser; Hugo Thimig
- Cinematography: Anton Pucher
- Production company: Volo-Film
- Release date: 29 December 1921
- Countries: Austria; Germany
- Languages: Silent; German intertitles

Clothes Make the Man (German: Kleider machen Leute) is a 1921 Austrian-German silent film based on the 1874 novella by Gottfried Keller, directed by Hans Steinhoff and starring Hermann Thimig, Dora Kaiser and Hugo Thimig.

== Cast ==
- Hermann Thimig as Jaro Sprapinsky
- Dora Kaiser as Nettchen
- Hugo Thimig as Wirt zur goldenen Waage
- Thea Oesey as Erika
- Wilhelm Schmidt as Melchior Böhnli
- Franz Kammauf as bailiff
- Cornelius Kirschner as pastor
- Eugen Guenther as pharmacist
- Fritz Strassny as professor
- Josef Moser as notary
- Victor Kutschera as beggar
- Hans Thimig as fool

== Reception ==
Writing for the Deutsche Allgemeine Zeitung E. K. commented: "Hans Steinhoff leads an excellent stylistically true and artistically extremely commendable artistic direction, which really conjures back a 'happier' Biedermeier time and knows how to find amusing and trusting motifs. It's an absolutely German game with all the familiar beauty we love about Gottfried Keller. In the sometimes simple, undemanding way, Steinhoff's direction is reminiscent of Lang's Tired Death. A great success of Ufa".

== See also ==
- Clothes Make the Man (1940)
