= Franz Herterich =

German actor (1877–1966)

Franz Herterich (3 October 1877 – 28 October 1966) was a German actor. He was born in Munich and died in Vienna.

== Partial filmography ==
- The Eye of the Buddha (1919)
- Der Traum im Walde (1919) – alter Diener
- Todestreue (1919)
- The Prince and the Pauper (1920) – John Canty
- Dr. Hallin (1921) – Dr. Ernest Hallin
- Die Schauspielerin des Kaisers (1921)
- Samson and Delilah (1922) – Prince Andrei Andrewiwitch / Abimelech, Philistine King (double role)
- The Ragpicker of Paris (1922)
- Sodom und Gomorrha (1922)
- Children of the Revolution (1923)
- Das Gift der Borgia (1924)
- Der Musikant von Eisenstadt (1934) – Kaiser Franz
- So Ended a Great Love (1934)
- Dreams of Love (1935) – Franz Liszt
- Court Theatre (1936) – Director of the Burgtheaters
- Romance (1936)
- The Fire Devil (1940) – Emperor Francis I
- Thrice Wed (1941) – Great Prince
- Whom the Gods Love (1942)
- Aufruhr der Herzen (1944) – Raimund Brugger
- Kolberg (1945) – King Francis II
- Archduke Johann's Great Love (1950) – Kaiser Franz I
- Asphalt (1951)
- Maria Theresa (1951) – Nuncio
- 1. April 2000 (1952) – Amerik. Hochkommissar
- Franz Schubert (1953) – (uncredited) (final film role)

== Bibliography ==
- Kulik, Karol. Alexander Korda: The Man Who Could Work Miracles. Virgin Books, 1990.
