= The Fool and Death =

1920 film

- Directed by: Rudolf Stiaßny
- Written by: Siegfried Geyer (novel); Rudolf Stiaßny
- Starring: Lisa Kresse; Carl Goetz; Dora Kaiser
- Cinematography: Max Nekut
- Production company: Filmag
- Release date: 18 June 1920
- Country: Austria
- Languages: Silent; German intertitles

The Fool and Death (German: Narr und Tod) is a 1920 Austrian silent drama film directed by Rudolf Stiaßny and starring Lisa Kresse, Carl Goetz and Dora Kaiser.

== Cast ==
- Lisa Kresse
- Carl Goetz
- Dora Kaiser
- Hans Lackner
- Paul Kronegg

== Bibliography ==
- Janelle Blankenship & Tobias Nag.European Visions: Small Cinemas in Transition. Transcript, 2015
