= David Martin (poet) =

Australian poet

David Martin AM
- Born: Lajos/Ludwig Detsinyi; 22 December 1915; Budapest, Austria-Hungary
- Died: 1 July 1997 (aged 81); Beechworth, Victoria, Australia
- Citizenship: Australian
- Occupations: Novelist, poet, playwright, journalist, editor, literary reviewer and lecturer
- Writing career
- Notable awards: Member of the Order of Australia (1988); Patrick White Award (1991)

David Martin AM (22 December 1915 – 1 July 1997), born Lajos or Ludwig Detsinyi, into a Jewish family in Hungary (then part of Austria-Hungary), was an Australian novelist, poet, playwright, journalist, editor, literary reviewer and lecturer. He also used the names Louis Adam and Louis Destiny, adopting the name David Martin after moving to England.

== Biography ==
Martin was born in Budapest, but educated in Germany. He left Germany in 1934, spending time in the Netherlands, Hungary and Palestine. In 1937 he travelled to Spain. where he served as a volunteer in the medical service of the International Brigade of the Spanish Republican Army during the Spanish Civil War.

In 1938 Martin joined his father in London, working in his clothing factory, before moving to Glasgow in 1941 where he worked as a correspondent with the Daily Express. In 1941, Martin married Elizabeth Richenda Powell, great-granddaughter of the Quaker Elizabeth Fry. They had one son, Jan. Martin returned to London, working for the BBC until 1944. From 1945 to 1947 he was literary editor of Reynold's News. In 1948 he travelled to India as British correspondent for the Daily Express.

Martin and his family settled in Australia from 1950, settling in Melbourne, where Martin commenced work as a freelance journalist and editor of the Australian Jewish News. He joined the Communist Party in 1951, was active until 1956 and remained a member until 1959, when he was asked to resign. He had weekly current affairs columns in Free Press (1951–52) and the Sunday Observer (1969–71) and was foreign correspondent for the Indian newspaper Hindu (c. 1946–67) and for the Canadian newspaper the Montreal Star (c. 1966–69). In addition, he contributed an enormous number of articles, short stories and reviews to a variety of newspapers and journals, including Overland, Meanjin, Southerly and Quadrant, covering a diverse range of topics.

In 1988, Martin was made a Member of the Order of Australia for his services to Australian literature. He also won the Patrick White Award in 1991 and was given an Emeritus Award by the Literature Fund of the Australia Council in 1996. David Martin died in Beechworth, Victoria, on 1 July 1997.

One of his grandchildren, Toby Martin, is the guitarist and frontman of the rock band Youth Group.

== Bibliography ==
=== Poetry collections ===
- Battlefields and girls. 1942.
- Trident (1944)
- Rhyme and Reason : Thirty-Four Poems (1944)
- The Shoes Men Walk In (1946)
- From Life : Selected Poems (1953)
- Poems of David Martin 1938-58 (1958)
- The Gift: Poems 1959-65 (1966)
- The Idealist (1968)
- I Rhyme My Time : A Selection of Poems for Young People (1980)
- Foreigners (1981)
- Peppino (1983)
- David Martin’s Beechworth book: poems (1993)

=== Novels ===
- Tiger Bay (1946)
- The Stones of Bombay (1950)
- The Young Wife (1962)
- The Hero of Too (1965)
- The King Between (1966)
- Where a Man Belongs (1969)

=== Young adult and children's novels ===
- Hughie (1971)
- Frank and Francesca (1972)
- Gary (1972)
- The Chinese Boy (1973)
- Katie (1974)
- The Cabby’s Daughter (1974)
- Mister P and his Remarkable Flight (1975)
- The Devilish Mystery of the Flying Mum (1977)
- The Mermaid Attack (1978)
- The Man in the Red Turban (1978)
- Peppino Says Goodbye (1980)
- Peppino Turns His Luck (1982)
- Peppino (1983)
- Peppino in the Tobacco War (1984)
- The Girl Who Didn't Know Kelly (1985)
- The Kitten Who Wouldn’t Purr (1987)
- Clowning Sim (1988)

=== Drama ===
- The Shepherd and the Hunter (1946)
- Spiegel the Cat (1961)
- The Young Wife (1966)

=== Non-fiction ===
- On the Road to Sydney (1970) travel

=== Autobiography ===
- Fox On My Door (1987)
- My Strange Friend: An Autobiography (1991)
