= The Ragpicker of Paris =

1922 film directed by Hans Otto

- Directed by: Hans Otto
- Written by: Hans Otto
- Produced by: Hans Otto
- Starring: Dora Kaiser; Franz Herterich; Olaf Fjord
- Production company: Löwenstein Film
- Release date: 9 June 1922
- Country: Austria
- Languages: Silent; German intertitles

The Ragpicker of Paris (German: Der Lumpensammler von Paris) is a 1922 Austrian silent film directed by Hans Otto and starring Dora Kaiser, Franz Herterich and Olaf Fjord.

== Cast ==
- Dora Kaiser
- Franz Herterich
- Olaf Fjord
- Hans Otto Lundt
- Carl Huber
- Paul Baratoff
- Lola Urban-Kneidinger
- Dora Kaiser
- Tini Senders

== Bibliography ==
- Fritz, Walter & Lachmann, Götz. Im Kino erlebe ich die Welt--: 100 Jahre Kino und Film in Österreich. Verlag Christian Brandstätter, 1997.
