= The Eye of the Buddha =

- Directed by: Maurice Armand Mondet
- Written by: Alfred Deutsch-German
- Starring: Fritz Kortner; Franz Herterich; Nelly Hochwald
- Cinematography: Adolf Schlasy
- Production company: Filmag
- Release date: 21 March 1919
- Running time: 78 minutes
- Country: Austria
- Languages: Silent; German intertitles

The Eye of the Buddha (German: Das Auge des Buddha) is a 1919 Austrian silent film directed by Maurice Armand Mondet and starring Fritz Kortner, Franz Herterich and Nelly Hochwald.

== Cast ==
- Fritz Kortner as indischer Diener
- Franz Herterich
- Nelly Hochwald
- Grete Lundt
- Leopold Kramer

== Bibliography ==
- Bock, Hans-Michael & Bergfelder, Tim. The Concise CineGraph. Encyclopedia of German Cinema. Berghahn Books, 2009.
