= Spiegel the Cat =

- Genre: drama play
- Running time: 60 mins (8:00 pm – 9:00 pm)
- Country of origin: Australia
- Language: English
- Syndicates: ABC
- Written by: David Martin
- Original release: December 15, 1951

Spiegel the Cat is a 1952 Australian radio play by David Martin. It was adapted from Spiegel the Cat, a story from the Swiss writer Gottfried Keller.

It was first written as a poem then adapted for radio.

The play was one of the most regarded Australian radio plays of the 1950s. The Australian Jewish News called it "a wholly delightful piece of legendary, full of dancing wit and good humour, of sorcery and charm, mixing some of the folk flavour of Grimm with the versifying elegancies of Chaucer. It is certainly a novelty in ABC programmes."

It was repeated in 1952 and recorded again in 1953 and 1955.

It was adapted into a book in 1961.
