= The Uninvited Guest (1925 film) =

1925 film directed by Max Mack

- Directed by: Max Mack
- Production company: Dreamland-Film
- Release date: 29 September 1925
- Country: Austria
- Languages: Silent; German intertitles

The Uninvited Guest (German: Der ungebetene Gast) is a 1925 Austrian silent film directed by Max Mack.

== Cast ==
In alphabetical order

- Eugen Jensen
- Dora Kaiser
- Paul Kronegg
- Rudi Merstallinger
- [Oskar Sachs
- Julius Strobl]
- Hermann Thimig
- Hugo Werner-Kahle

== Bibliography ==
- Bock, Hans-Michael & Bergfelder, Tim. The Concise CineGraph. Encyclopedia of German Cinema. Berghahn Books, 2009.
