= A Village Romeo and Juliet =

1907 opera by Frederick Delius

- Opera by Frederick Delius
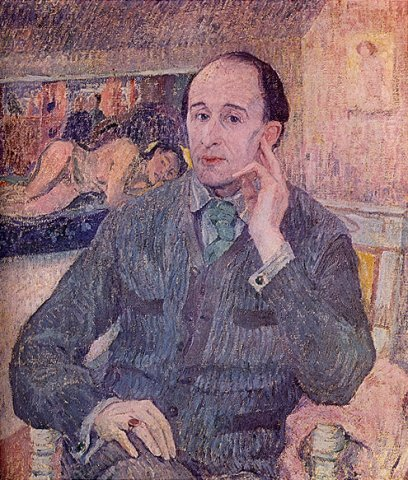
- Delius, 1912 painting by his spouse, Jelka Rosen
- Native title: Romeo und Julia auf dem Dorfe
- Librettist: Jelka and Frederick Delius
- Language: English
- Based on: Romeo und Julia auf dem Dorfe by Gottfried Keller
- Premiere: 21 February 1907; Komische Oper Berlin

A Village Romeo and Juliet is an opera by Frederick Delius, the fourth of his six operas. The composer, with his wife Jelka, wrote the English-language libretto based on the novella Romeo und Julia auf dem Dorfe by Swiss author Gottfried Keller from his collection Seldwyla Folks (Die Leute von Seldwyla). Keller was inspired by a newspaper notice about the suicide of a young couple; he then set the story in a Swiss village torn by a feud between two neighbouring families, similar to Shakespeare's Romeo and Juliet.

== Performance history ==
The first performance was at the Komische Oper Berlin on 21 February 1907, as Romeo und Julia auf dem Dorfe. Thomas Beecham conducted the British premiere at the Royal Opera House, Covent Garden, in London on 22 February 1910. The US premiere was on 26 April 1972 in Washington, D.C.

The New York City Opera (NYCO) staged the work in 1973 for the opera's New York City premiere with Richard T. Gill as Marti, June Angela as the child Vreli, Patricia Wells as the adult Vreli, John Stewart as Sali, David Holloway as the Dark Fiddler, and Thomas Jamerson, William Ledbetter and David Griffith as the Three Barge Men. In his review of the NYCO production, music critic Allen Hughes wrote, "This piece has had few productions in the 72 years of its existence, and the reasons for that are not hard to find. To begin, it is, essentially, two hours of mood music for orchestra with secondary parts for singers, and the orchestra envisioned by Delius was so vast as to be impractical for conventional opera presentation. Furthermore, the staging implications were such that they could not be realized adequately in a theater depending upon physical sets and for effects."

While the opera has rarely been staged, the orchestral interlude between scenes 5 and 6, "The Walk to the Paradise Garden", is heard separately in concerts and has been recorded many times.

== Roles ==
Roles, voice types, premiere cast
Role	Voice type	Premiere cast, 21 February 1907 Conductor: Fritz Cassirer
Manz	baritone	
Marti	baritone	
Sali, son of Manz as a child	soprano	
Sali, son of Manz as a man	tenor	Willi Merkel
Vreli, daughter of Marti	soprano	Lola Artôt de Padilla
The dark fiddler	baritone	Desider Zádor
Two peasant men	baritones	
Three peasant women	sopranos	
Gingerbread woman	soprano	Minnie Egener
Wheel of fortune woman	soprano	
Cheap jewellery woman	mezzo-soprano	
Merry-go-round man	baritone	
Slim girl	soprano	
Wild girl	mezzo-soprano	
Poor horn player	tenor	
Hunchbacked bass player	bass	

The premiere of the English version featured Walter Hyde as Sali; Ruth Vincent as Vrenchen (Vreli); Robert Maitland as the Black Fiddler (sic); Harry Dearth as Manz; Dillon Shallard as Marti; Muriel Terry as the young Sali and the Wild Girl; Betty Booker as the young Vrenchen and the Slim Girl; Arthur Royd as the Poor Horn Player; and Albert Archdeacon as the Hunchback Bass Player.

== Synopsis ==
Two young lovers, Sali and Vreneli, whose families are locked in a bitter feud over a piece of land in rural Switzerland, die by drowning themselves.

== Recordings ==
Year	Cast	Conductor, orchestra	Label
1946–1952	Rene Soames, Vera Terry, Gordon Clinton, Denis Dowling, Frederick Sharp	Sir Thomas Beecham, Royal Philharmonic Orchestra and Chorus	CD: EMI Classics, Cat: ?? CD: Naxos, Cat: 8.110982-83
1971	Robert Tear, Elizabeth Harwood, John Shirley-Quirk, Benjamin Luxon	Meredith Davies, Royal Philharmonic Orchestra; John Alldis Choir	CD: EMI Classics, Cat: ?
1989	Arthur Davies, Helen Field, Thomas Hampson, Stafford Dean, Barry Mora	Sir Charles Mackerras, ORF Symphony Orchestra; Arnold Schoenberg Choir	CD: Decca, Cat: 430 275-2; Used as soundtrack for Petr Weigl's; 1992 film Romeo a Julie na vsi
1995	Eva-Christine Reimer, Karsten Russ, Klaus Wallprecht, David Midboe, Attila Kovacs	Klauspeter Seibel, Opernhaus Kiel Orchestra and Chorus (sung in German)	CD: CPO; Cat: CPO 999 328-2
