= Max Reinhardt =

Austrian-born theatre and film director (1873–1943)

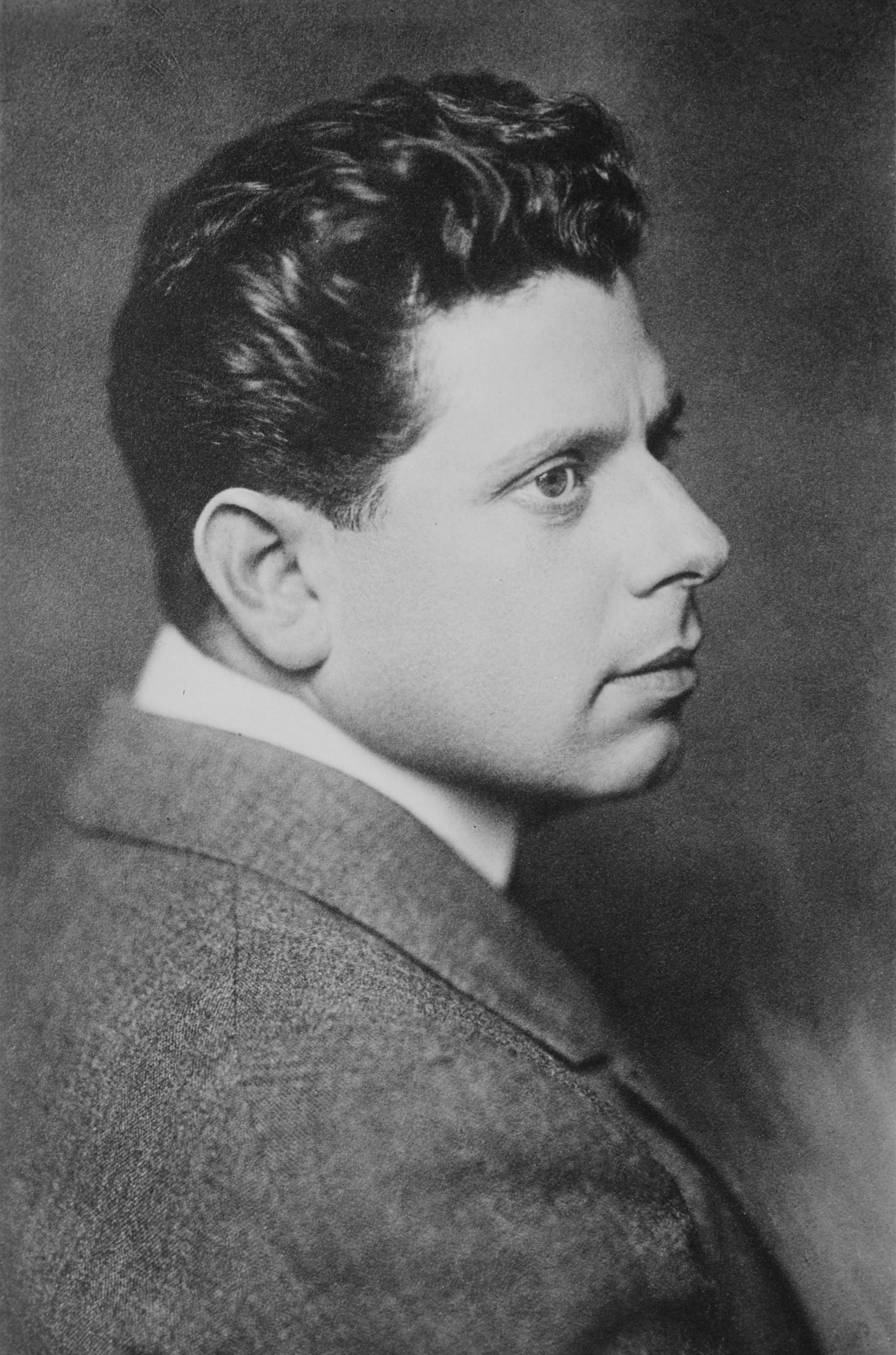
- Reinhardt in 1911, photograph by Nicola Perscheid
- Born: Maximilian Goldmann; 9 September 1873; Baden bei Wien, Austria-Hungary
- Died: 30 October 1943 (aged 70); New York City, US
- Resting place: Westchester Hills Cemetery
- Occupations: Theatre director, theatrical producer, actor
- Spouse(s): Else Heims (1910–1935; divorced; 2 children); Helene Thimig (1935–1943; his death)
- Children: Wolfgang Reinhardt; Gottfried Reinhardt

Signature
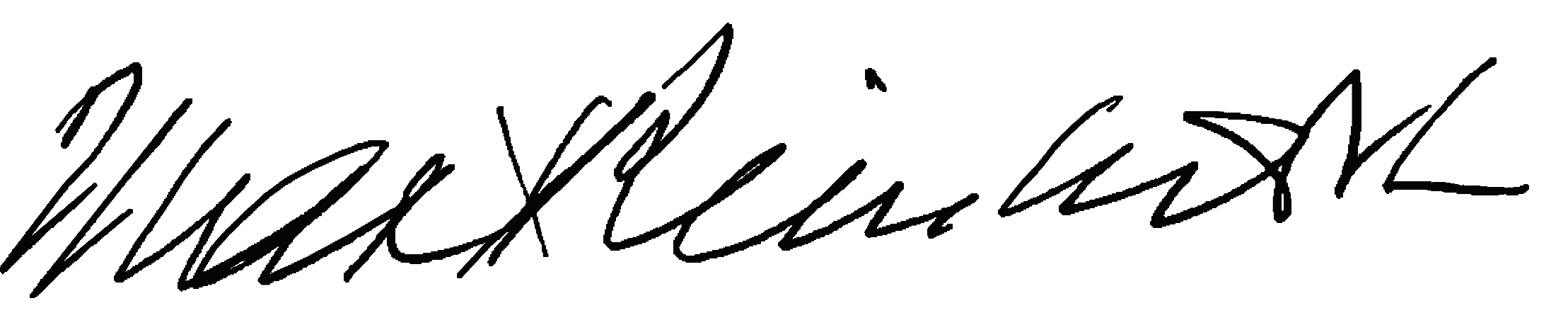

Max Reinhardt (German: [maks ˈʁaɪnhaʁt]; born Maximilian Goldmann; 9 September 1873 – 30 October 1943) was an Austrian-born theatre and film director, intendant, and theatrical producer. With his radically innovative and avant-garde stage productions, Reinhardt is regarded as one of the most prominent stage directors of the early 20th century.

For example, Reinhardt's 1917 stage premiere of Reinhard Sorge's Kleist Prize-winning stage play Der Bettler almost single-handedly gave birth to Expressionism in theatre and ultimately in motion pictures as well. In 1920, Reinhardt established the Salzburg Festival by directing an open air production of Hugo von Hofmannsthal's acclaimed adaptation of the Everyman Medieval mystery play in the square before the Cathedral with the Alps as a background. This remains an annual custom at the Salzburg Festival to this day.

Toby Cole and Helen Krich Chinoy have dubbed Reinhardt, "one of the most picturesque actor-directors of modern times", and write that his eventual arrival in the United States as a refugee from the imminent Nazi takeover of Austria followed a long and distinguished career, "inspired by the example of social participation in the ancient Greek and Medieval theatres", of seeking, "to bridge the separation between actors and audiences".

In 1935, Reinhardt directed his first and only motion picture in the United States through Warner Brothers, the Expressionist film adaptation of William Shakespeare's A Midsummer Night's Dream, starring James Cagney, Olivia De Havilland, and Mickey Rooney. The film was banned by the Ministry of Propaganda in an infamous example of censorship in Nazi Germany. This was due not only to Joseph Goebbels' belief that Expressionism was degenerate art, but even more so due to the Jewish ancestry of Reinhardt, Classical composer Felix Mendelssohn, and soundtrack arranger Erich Wolfgang Korngold, whose work was already banned by Goebbels as allegedly degenerate music.

Reinhardt also founded the influential drama schools Hochschule für Schauspielkunst "Ernst Busch" in Berlin, Max Reinhardt Seminar, the Max Reinhardt Workshop (Sunset Boulevard), and the Max Reinhardt Junior Workshop. Although Reinhardt did not live long enough to witness the end of Nazism in 1945, his formerly expropriated estate at Schloss Leopoldskron near Salzburg was restored to his widow. His legacy continues to be celebrated and honoured in the modern Germanosphere for his radically innovative contributions to the performing arts.

== Early life ==
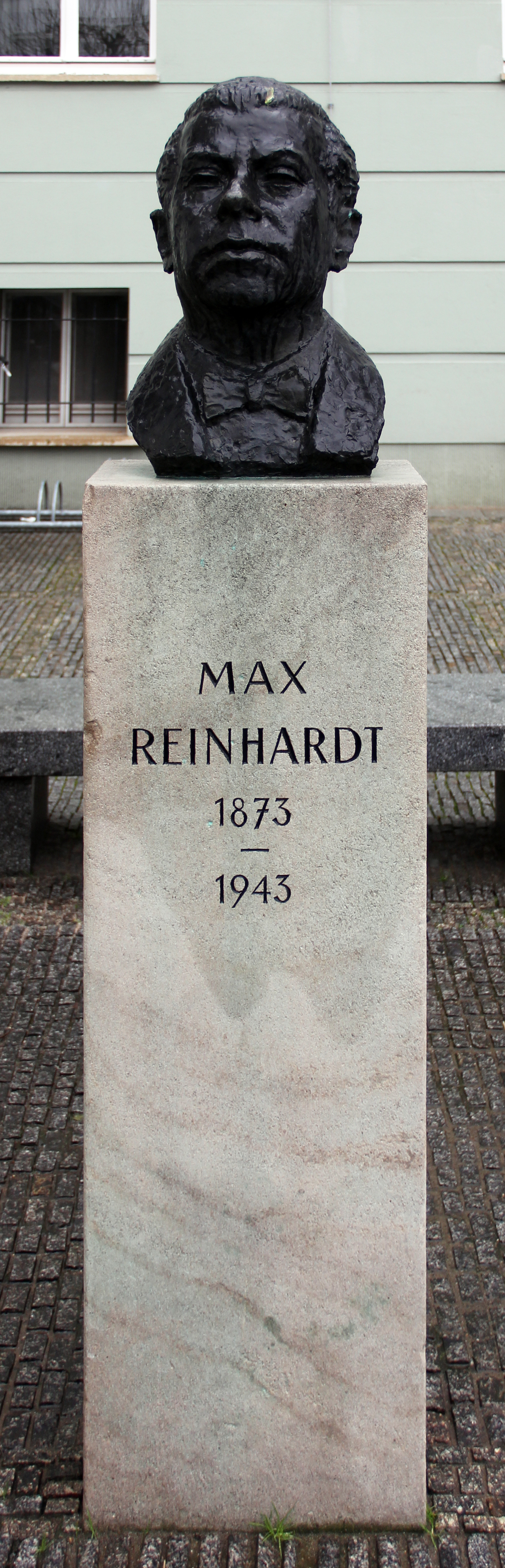
Bust of Max Reinhardt in front of the Deutsches Theater Berlin

Reinhardt was born Maximilian Goldmann in the spa town of Baden bei Wien, to Jewish parents Rachel Lea Rosi "Rosa" Goldmann and her husband Wilhelm Goldmann, a merchant from Stupava, Slovakia. Having finished school, he began an apprenticeship at a bank, but already took acting lessons.

== Career ==
In 1890, he made his debut on a private stage in Vienna with the stage name Max Reinhardt (possibly after the protagonist Reinhard Werner in Theodor Storm's novella Immensee). In 1893, he performed at the re-opened Salzburg City Theatre. One year later, Reinhardt relocated to Germany, joining the Deutsches Theater ensemble under director Otto Brahm in Berlin.

Reinhardt was one of the contributors to the Swedish avant-garde theatre magazine Thalia between 1910 and 1913. In 1918, Reinhardt purchased Schloss Leopoldskron castle in Salzburg.

In October 1922, Reinhardt was in the audience when The Dybbuk was staged by the Vilna Troupe at the Roland Theater in Vienna. Reinhardt rushed backstage and congratulated the actors. At the time he was already recognized in Austria as distinguished theater director. A couple of months before his endorsement for The Dybbuk, Reinhardt had again successfully staged Jedermann (Everyman) for the Salzburg Festival.

=== Exile ===
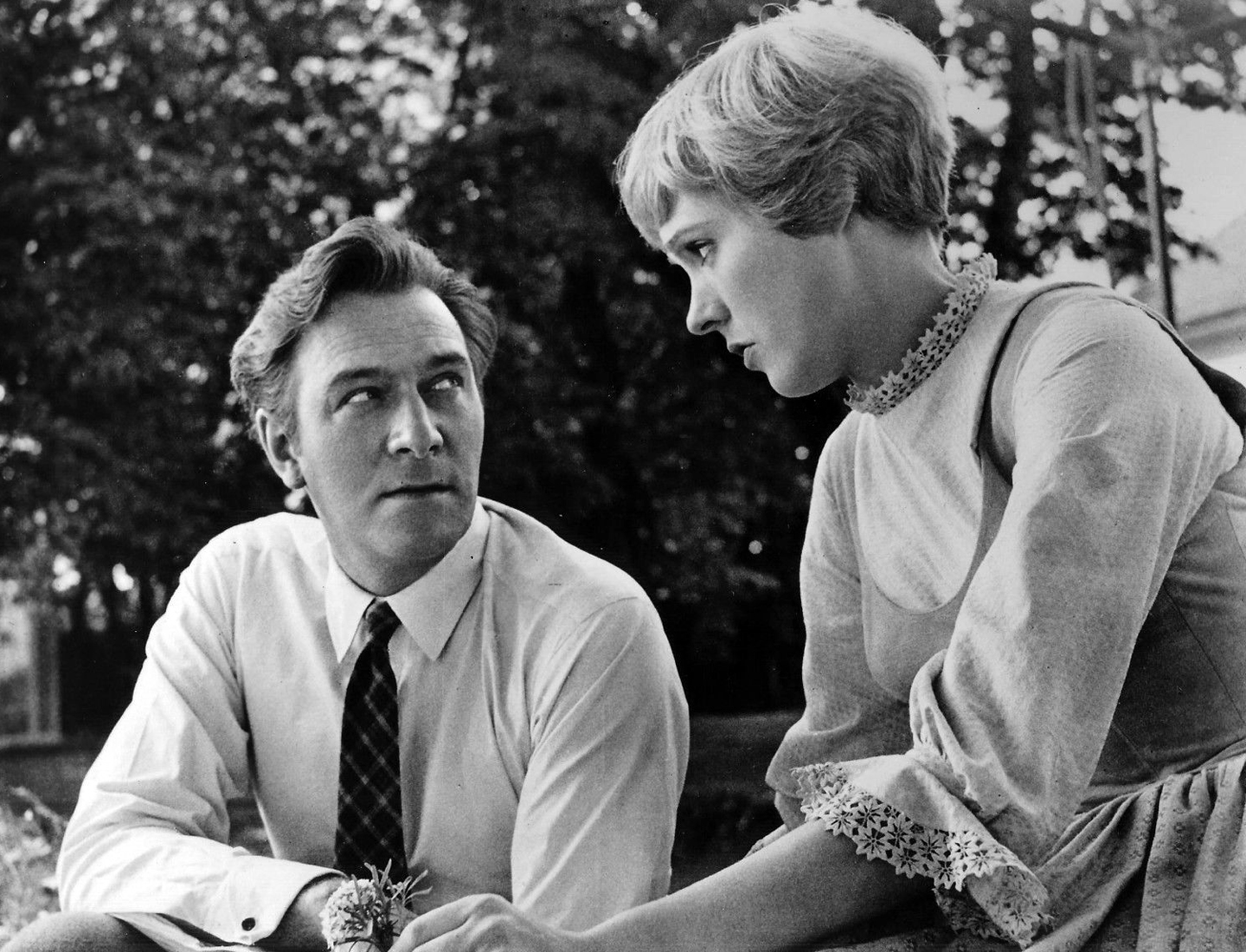
Christopher Plummer and Julie Andrews on location in Salzburg, 1964

Reinhardt fled Germany due to the increasing anti-Semitic aggressions of the Nazis. The castle was seized following Germany's annexation of Austria in 1938. After the war, the castle was restored to Reinhardt's heirs, and subsequently the home and grounds became famous as the filming site for the early scenes of the Von Trapp family gardens in the movie The Sound of Music.

=== Reinhardt theatres ===
In 1901, Reinhardt, together with Friedrich Kayßler and several other theatre colleagues, founded the Schall und Rauch (Sound and Smoke) Kabarett stage in Berlin. Re-opened as Kleines Theater (Little Theatre), it was the first of numerous stages where Reinhardt worked as a director until the beginning of Nazi rule in 1933. From 1903 to 1905, he managed the Neues Theater (present-day Theater am Schiffbauerdamm) and in 1906 acquired the Deutsches Theater in Berlin. In 1911, he premiered with Karl Vollmöller's The Miracle in Olympia, London, gaining an international reputation.

In 1910, Siegfried Jacobsohn wrote his book entitled Max Reinhardt. In 1914, he was persuaded to sign the Manifesto of the Ninety-Three, defending the German invasion of Belgium; he was signatory 66. He later expressed regret at signing.

From 1915 to 1918, Reinhardt also worked as director of the Volksbühne theatre.

On 23 December, 1917, Reinhardt presided over the world premiere of Reinhard Sorge's Kleist Prize-winning stage play Der Bettler, which had long been, "a succès de scandale, an innovation, changing the course of theatrical history with its revolutionary staging techniques".

According to Michael Paterson, "The genius of the 20-year old Sorge already showed the possibilities of abstract staging, and Reinhardt in 1917, simply by following Sorge's stage directions, was to become the first director to present a play in wholly Expressionist style."

According to Michael Paterson, "The play opens with an ingenious inversion: the Poet and Friend converse in front of a closed curtain, behind which voices can be heard. It appears that we, the audience, are backstage and the voices are those of the imagined audience out front. It is a simple, but disorienting trick of stagecraft, whose imaginative spatial reversal is self-consciously theatrical. So the audience is alerted to the fact that they are about to see a play and not a 'slice of life'."

According to Walter H. Sokel, "The lighting apparatus behaves like the mind. It drowns in darkness what it wishes to forget and bathes in light what it wishes to recall. Thus the entire stage becomes a universe of [the] mind, and the individual scenes are not replicas of three-dimensional physical reality, but visualizes stages of thought."

Reinhardt's production of the play, which he had meticulously planned ever since he had purchased the rights from Sorge in 1913, proved enormously popular and productions immediately began to be staged in other German cities, such as Cologne. After the 1918 Armistice, newspapers in the German language in the United States also published articles highly praising Reinhardt's production of the play, which singlehandedly gave birth to Expressionism in the theatre.

After the November Revolution of 1918, Reinhardt re-opened the Großes Schauspielhaus (after World War II renamed into Friedrichstadtpalast) in 1919, following its expressionist conversion by Hans Poelzig. By 1930, he ran eleven stages in Berlin, and additionally managed the Theater in der Josefstadt in Vienna from 1924 to 1933.

In 1920, Reinhardt established the Salzburg Festival with Richard Strauss and Hugo von Hofmannsthal, always directing the annual production of Hoffmansthal's acclaimed adaptation of the Medieval Dutch morality play Everyman, in which the Christian God sends Death to summon an archetype of the Human Race to Judgment Day. In the United States, he successfully directed The Miracle in 1924, and a popular stage version of Shakespeare's A Midsummer Night's Dream in 1927.

From the 1910s to the early 1930s, one of Reinhardt's most frequent collaborators was the Swedish-born American composer and conductor Einar Nilson, whom he employed as the music department head of his theaters; during international trips, Nilson would also serve as an advance man for Reinhardt, traveling ahead to the next performance location to audition singers and actors. Reinhardt, moreover, often would utilize existing music by famous composers (for example, Mozart and Mendelssohn) for his productions, which Nilson would arrange to meet Reinhardt's needs. Nilson also composed original music, such as the incidental music for Hofmannsthal's Jedermann.

Reinhardt followed that success by directing a film version of A Midsummer Night's Dream in 1935 using a mostly different cast which included James Cagney, Mickey Rooney, Joe E. Brown, and Olivia de Havilland, among others. Rooney and de Havilland had also appeared in Reinhardt's 1934 stage production, which was staged at the Hollywood Bowl. The Nazis banned the film because of the Jewish ancestry of both Reinhardt and Felix Mendelssohn, whose music (arranged by Erich Wolfgang Korngold) was used throughout the film.

After the annexation of Austria to Nazi-governed Germany in 1938, Reinhardt emigrated first to Britain, then to the United States. In 1940, he became a naturalized citizen of the United States. At that time, he was married to his second wife, actress Helene Thimig, daughter of actor Hugo Thimig and sister of actors Hans and Hermann Thimig.

By employing powerful staging techniques, and integrating stage design, language, music and choreography, Reinhardt introduced new dimensions into German theatre. The Max Reinhardt Seminar in Vienna, which is arguably the most important German-language acting school, was installed implementing his ideas.

=== Max Reinhardt and film ===
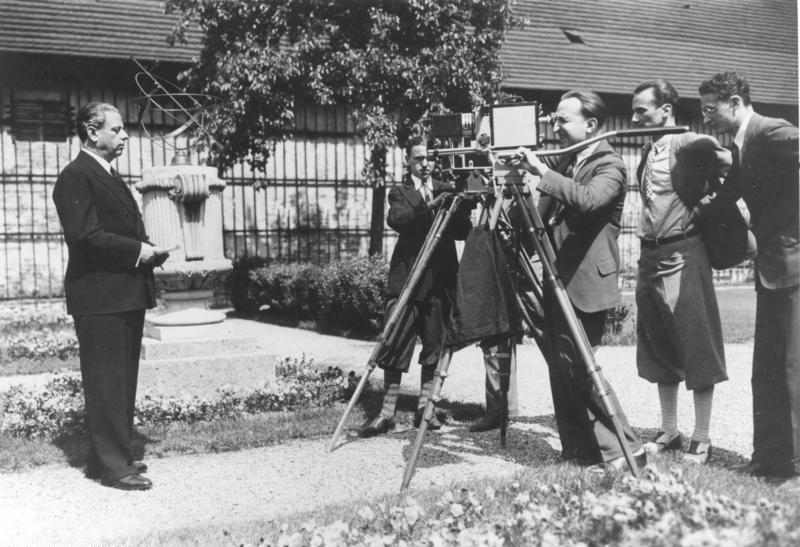
Max Reinhardt is filmed in his garden, 1930

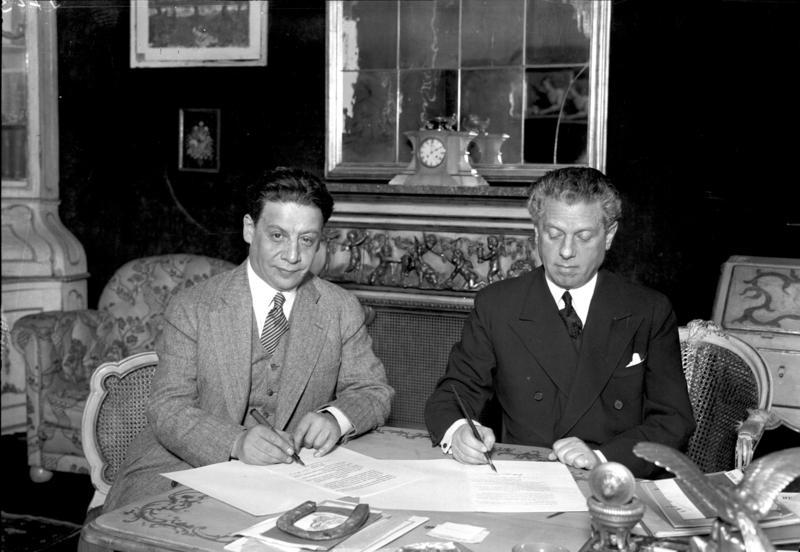
Max Reinhardt signing a contract with the US film producer Curtis Melnitz in Berlin, 1930

Reinhardt took a greater interest in film than most of his contemporaries in the theater world. He made films as a director, and occasionally as a producer. His first staging was the film Sumurûn in 1910. After that, Reinhardt founded his own film company. He sold the film rights for the film adaptation of the play Das Mirakel (The Miracle) to Joseph Menchen, whose full-colour 1912 film of The Miracle gained world-wide success. Controversies around the staging of Das Mirakel, which was shown in the Vienna Rotunde in 1912, led to Reinhardt's retreat from the project. The author of the play, Reinhardt's friend and confidant Karl Gustav Vollmoeller, had French director Michel Carré finish the shooting.

Reinhardt made two films, Die Insel der Seligen (Isle of the Blessed) and Eine venezianische Nacht (Venetian Nights), under a four-picture contract for the German film producer Paul Davidson. Released in 1913 and 1914, respectively, both films received negative reviews from the press and public. The other two films called for in the contract were never made.

Both films demanded much of cameraman Karl Freund because of Reinhardt's special shooting needs, such as filming a lagoon in moonlight. Isle of the Blessed attracted attention due to its erotic nature; its ancient mythical setting included sea gods, nymphs, and fauns, and the actors appeared naked. However, the film also fit in with the strict customs of the late German and Austrian empires. The actors had to live up to the demands of double roles: Wilhelm Diegelmann and Willy Prager played bourgeois fathers as well as the sea gods, Ernst Matray played both a bachelor and a faun, while Leopoldine Konstantin the Circe. The shooting for Eine venezianische Nacht by Karl Gustav Vollmoeller took place in Venice. Maria Carmi played the bride, Alfred Abel the young stranger, and Ernst Matray Anselmus and Pipistrello. The shooting was disturbed by a fanatic who incited the attendant Venetians against the German-speaking staff.

In 1935, Reinhardt directed his first film in the US, A Midsummer Night's Dream.

== Max Reinhardt Seminar ==
Max Reinhardt Seminar trained Kurt Kasznar.

== Max Reinhardt Workshop ==
Reinhardt won the school, Ben Bard Drama (a playhouse on Wilshire Boulevard), from Ben Bard in a poker game. Reinhardt opened the Reinhardt School of the Theatre in Hollywood, on Sunset Boulevard. Several notable stars of the day received classical theater training, among them actress Nanette Fabray (Reinhardt School of the Theatre in Hollywood). Many alumni of these schools made their careers in film. For two years, Edward G. Kuster was the personal assistant to Reinhardt, where he taught classes and directed plays. In 1938, Walden Philip Boyle, later, a founding faculty member of the Department of Theater Arts at the University of California, Los Angeles (UCLA), worked with the Max Reinhardt Theatre Academy in Hollywood. Students included Alan Ladd, Jack Carson, Robert Ryan, Gower Champion, Shirley Temple, Angie Dickinson, Frank Bonner, Anthony James, Greg Mullavey, Charlene Tilton, and Cliff Robertson. In 1943, Reinhardt departed. It later was known as Geller Theatre Workshop, Hollywood School of Acting, and Theatre of Arts Hollywood Acting School.

In 2000, the school, Theatre of Arts, was associated with Campus Hollywood, which included Musicians Institute and Los Angeles College of Music. In 2009, James Warwick was appointed president.

Max Reinhardt's Workshop of Stage, Screen, and Radio (Reinhardt School of the Theatre) trained Ann Savage, and Joan Barry, while the Max Reinhardt Junior Workshop trained Mala Powers.

== Death and legacy ==
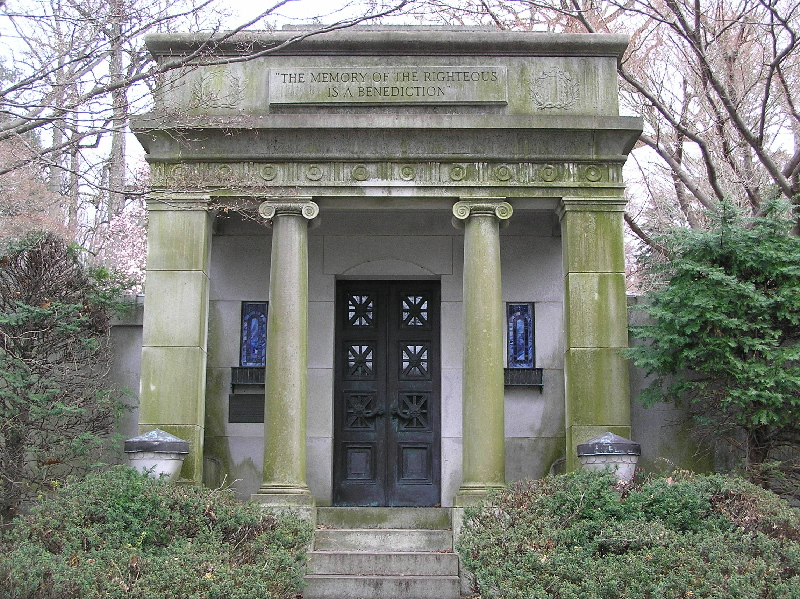
The mausoleum of Max Reinhardt in Westchester Hills Cemetery

In 1943, Reinhardt died of a stroke at the age of 70 in New York City, and his remains were interred at Westchester Hills Cemetery in Hastings-on-Hudson, Westchester County, New York. His papers and literary estate are housed at Binghamton University (SUNY), in the Max Reinhardt Archives and Library.

His sons with his first wife Else Heims (m. 1910–1935), Wolfgang and Gottfried Reinhardt, were also well-regarded as film producers. One of his grandsons (by adoption), Stephen Reinhardt, was a labor lawyer who notably served on the United States Court of Appeals for the Ninth Circuit from his appointment by Jimmy Carter in 1980 until his death in 2018. Another grandson, Michael Reinhardt, is a successful fashion photographer. In 2015, his great-granddaughter, Jelena Ulrike Reinhardt, was appointed as a researcher at the University of Perugia in German literature.

== Tribute ==
On 18 November, 2015, the Friedrichstadt-Palast in Berlin inaugurated a memorial at Friedrichstraße 107 dedicated to the theatre's founders, Max Reinhardt, Hans Poelzig, and Erik Charell.

== Work on Broadway ==
- Sumurun (pantomime) (1912) – leader of the Deutsches Theater of Berlin on a New York tour
- The Miracle (1924) – Co-playwright and director
- A Midsummer Night's Dream (revival) (1927) – Producer
- Jedermann (1927) – Co-producer
- Peripherie (1928) – Playwright
- Redemption (revival) (1928) – Director
- The Eternal Road (1937) – Director
- The Merchant of Yonkers (1938), Thornton Wilder's play, later rewritten as The Matchmaker
- Sons and Soldiers (1943) – Producer and director

== Films ==
- A Midsummer Night's Dream (1935)

== See also ==
- The Continental Players, co-founded by Reinhardt
- Afterlife, play by Michael Frayn based on Reinhardt's life: National Theatre, London (2008)
