= Richard Kubla =

Czech singer (1890–1964)

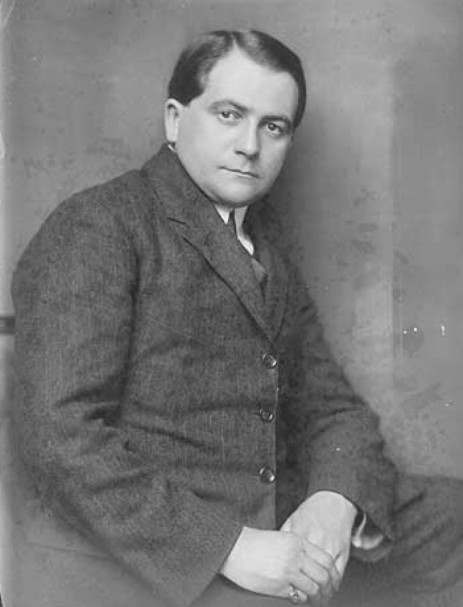
Richard Kubla in 1924

Richard Kubla (11 February 1890 – 9 July 1964) was a Czech tenor who had an active international career in operas, concerts, and recitals from 1910-1945. He had a particularly lengthy association with the National Theatre Prague where he was heard annually from 1924-1945.

== Professional career ==
Born in Ostrava, Kubla studied the violin as a child and already performed as a soloist at the age of seven. His uncle, conductor of a children's choir, advised him to take singing lessons, which he did in Prague with Bohumil Ptak, later with Vaclav Svtech. Before pursuing a music conservatory education, he studied law in his native country. He then entered the Vienna Academy of Music and the Performing Arts in 1911 where he was a pupil through 1914.

Kubla made has debut as a professional singer in 1910 as a concert soloist. He first appeared on the opera stage in the role of Rodolfo in Puccini's La bohème at the Vienna Volksoper in 1914. He was a member of that opera house until 1920. His next engagement was at the Neues Deutsches Theater in Prague (1920–1924), where he sang the principal role in the premiere of the revised version of Alexander von Zemlinsky's opera Kleider machen Leute (20 April 1922). Subsequently, he worked as a permanent guest-artist at the National Theatre Prague, where he had made guest appearances before. He rejoined the Vienna Volksoper as a member during the 1932–1933 season, and again from 1936 until 1938. He made numerous guest-appearances, a.o. at the Vienna State Opera (1919, 1935, 1937) and in opera houses in Munich, Hamburg and Budapest. He also performed in Cairo, Chicago and New York City. His repertoire included one hundred and thirty roles (a.o. many Wagner roles, but also some operetta roles). He retired from the stage in 1945. He died in 1964 at the age of 74.
