= Kleider machen Leute (Suder) =

German opera

Kleider machen Leute is a 5-act German opera by Joseph Suder based on Gottfried Keller's 1874 novella of the same name set in Goldach, Switzerland. The opera was composed 1934 but not performed until June 10, 1964, at the Landestheater in Coburg. Suder had already started work on the opera when he discovered that Alexander Zemlinsky had already composed an opera on the same subject premiered in 1910.

== Recording ==
- Kleider machen Leute Coburn, König, Morgan, Probst, Bamberger Symphoniker, Uwe Mund, Orfeo 1984
