= Hans Thimig =

Austrian actor (1900–1991)

Hans Emil Thimig, pseudonym: Hans Werner (23 July 1900 in Vienna – 17 February 1991, also in Vienna) was an Austrian actor, film director, and stage director.

== Life ==
The youngest son of the Burgtheater actor Hugo Thimig and Franziska "Fanny" Hummel, his siblings included actors Helene Thimig and Hermann Thimig. He performed without any training as a 16-year-old under the pseudonym "Hans Werner" at the Wiener Volkstheater. From 1918 to 1924 he was engaged – under his real name – at the Burgtheater in Vienna, and then moved to the Theater in der Josefstadt, also in Vienna, managed by his future brother-in-law Max Reinhardt. There, besides his father, his sister Helene Thimig and his brother Hermann Thimig also performed, so that the Viennese public used to call it the "Thimig-Theater". He soon began to direct as well, at first in the Theater in der Josefstadt, and later also in the film industry.

Hans Thimig remained loyal to the Theater in der Josefstadt until 1942. It was also thanks to him that the theatre survived the National Socialist period relatively "Nazi-free". Thimig saw to it that the director of the Deutsches Theater in Berlin, Heinz Hilpert, also took over the running of the Josefstadt Theatre (Reinhardt too had managed both theatres simultaneously). When Max Reinhardt died in 1943 in the United States where he had gone as a refugee, Hilpert together with the Thimig brothers, despite the Nazi regime, organised a memorial event in the Theater in der Josefstadt.

At the end of 1944, Thimig's superiors ordered him to shoot a politically tendentious film in Berlin. Karl Hartl, the director of production at Wien-Film, advised him however just to "clear off", which he did. He withdrew to the small town of Wildalpen, where the family owned a holiday home, while Hartl covered for him and reported him sick. After the war Thimig became mayor of Wildalpen for a short time, as he was the only man in the place without a National Socialist record.

From 1949 he performed again on stage in Vienna, alternating among the Burgtheater (of which he became an honorary member) the Theater an der Josefstadt and the Wiener Volkstheater. On top of that he continued to work as a film director and in 1959 took over from his sister Helene (who retired on grounds of age) the direction of the prestigious Vienna Max Reinhardt Seminar, as the School of Drama of the Akademie für Musik und darstellende Kunst had been renamed after World War II, in honour of the great Austrian director.

Hans Thimig died in 1991 in Vienna, aged 90. He left his body to science, but a memorial stands in the Vienna Zentralfriedhof.

He was twice married. His daughter Henriette Thimig is also an actress.

== Filmography ==
Silent films:

- 1921: Clothes Make the Man – Narr
- 1922: Der Ausflug in die Seligkeit
- 1922: The Good for Nothings
- 1922: Sodom und Gomorrha
- 1923: Tales of Old Vienna – Wendelin Frohgemut jun.
- 1924: The Moon of Israel
- 1925: The Curse – Sinche
- 1925: Love Story
- 1927: Die Kirschen in Nachbars Garten / Die Strecke – Kargl jun.
- 1928: A Woman with Style – Die Ordonnanz
- 1928: Rich, Young and Beautiful – Paul
- 1929: The White Paradise – Donald Evans
- 1930: Was kostet die Liebe?

Sound films:

- 1930: Money on the Street – Max Kesselberg
- 1931: Poor as a Church Mouse – Frany, der Barons Sohn
- 1932: Lumpenkavaliere / Wiener Lumpenkavaliere
- 1932: Sehnsucht 202 – Ein Beamter
- 1933: Voices of Spring – Toni
- 1934: Jede Frau hat ein Geheimnis – Dr.Bürger
- 1935: Dance Music – Franz Hegner
- 1936: The Postman from Longjumeau – Pierre Touche, Dorfbarbier
- 1937: Ich möcht' so gern mit Dir allein sein / Millionäre – Freundlich, Prokurist
- 1937: Die glücklichste Ehe der Welt – Toni Hubermann
- 1938: Geld fällt vom Himmel – Christian Pasemann
- 1941: So gefällst Du mir (co-director)
- 1941: Brüderlein fein (director; co-wrote the screenplay)
- 1942: Die kluge Marianne (director; co-wrote the screenplay
- 1943: Die goldene Fessel (director)
- 1943: Two Happy People
- 1944: Umwege zu Dir (director; co-wrote the screenplay)
- 1944: Wie ein Dieb in der Nacht (director)
- 1947: Gottes Engel sind überall (director)
- 1948: Der Angeklagte hat das Wort /Maresi (director)
- 1951: Der schweigende Mund – Bürovorsteher
- 1952: Voices of Spring (director)
- 1953: Franz Schubert – Vater Schubert
- 1954: Wenn Du noch eine Mutter hast / Das Licht der Liebe – Schuldirektor
- 1954: Victoria in Dover – The Dean Chester
- 1955: His Daughter is Called Peter – Zimmerkellner
- 1955: Sarajevo – Rumerskirch
- 1956: And Who Is Kissing Me? – Paul Eckert
- 1958: Meine schöne Mama – Dr. Meyerhofer
- 1958: The Priest and the Girl – Legationsrat Düringer
- 1958: Sebastian Kneipp – Der Kardinal
- 1959: My Daughter Patricia – Dr. Hartung
- 1960: The Good Soldier Schweik – Magistrate (uncredited)
- 1960: Big Request Concert
- 1960: Final Accord – Dr. Thimm, Chefarzt
- 1960: Ich heirate Herrn Direktor
- 1961: Man in the Shadows – Dr. Stallinger, Professor
- 1965: Der Nachfolger (TV Movie) – Kardinal der Kongregation De Propaganda Fide
- 1965: Heidi – Dompförtner
- 1977: The Standard – Hofbeamter
