= Dora Kaiser =

Austrian actress

- Born: 11 September 1892; Vienna, Austro-Hungarian Empire
- Died: 12 January 1972 (aged 79); Vienna, Austria
- Occupation: Actress
- Years active: 1918-1925 (film)

Dora Kaiser (1892-1972) was an Austrian film actress of the silent era. Originally trained as a dancer, she began her career on stage before making her film debut in 1918. When Austria's leading film star Liane Haid left Wiener Kunstfilm, Kaiser replaced her in the company's films.

== Selected filmography ==
- The Fool and Death (1920)
- Clothes Make the Man (1921)
- The Woman in White (1921)
- Serge Panine (1922)
- The Ragpicker of Paris (1922)
- The Uninvited Guest (1925)

== Bibliography ==
- Robert Von Dassanowsky. Austrian Cinema: A History. McFarland, 2005.
