= Helene Thimig =

Austrian actress

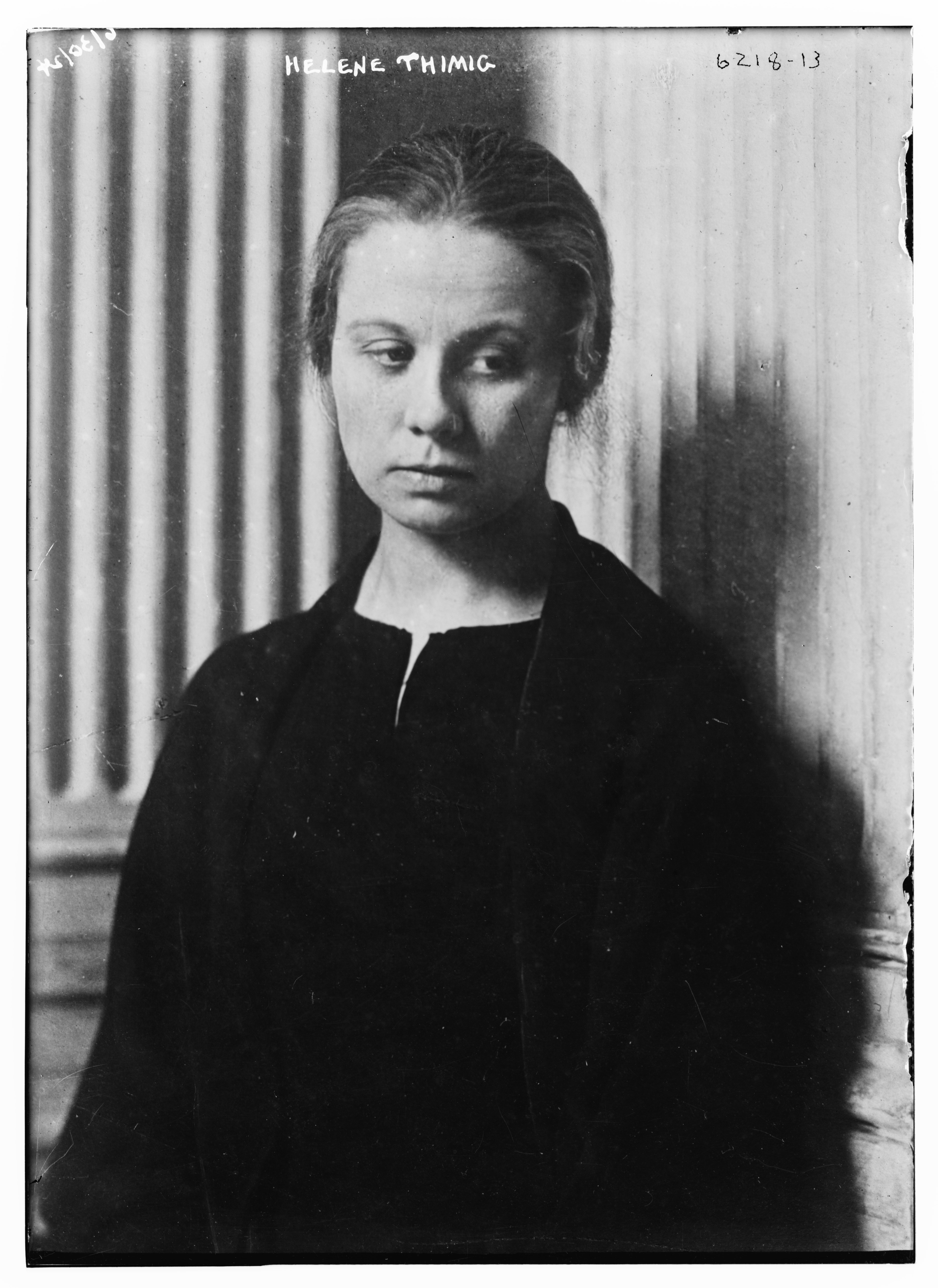
- Thimig c. 1910
- Born: Helene Ottilie Thimig; 5 June 1889; Vienna, Austro-Hungarian Empire
- Died: 7 November 1974 (aged 85); Vienna, Austria
- Other name: Helen Thimig
- Occupation: Actress
- Years active: 1907–1972
- Spouse(s): Max Reinhardt (1935–1943; his death); Anton Edthofer (1948–1971; his death)
- Parent(s): Hugo Thimig; Franziska "Fanny" Hummel
- Relatives: Hermann Thimig (brother); Hans Thimig (brother)

Helene Ottilie Thimig (5 June 1889 – 7 November 1974) was an Austrian stage and film actress.

== Personal life ==
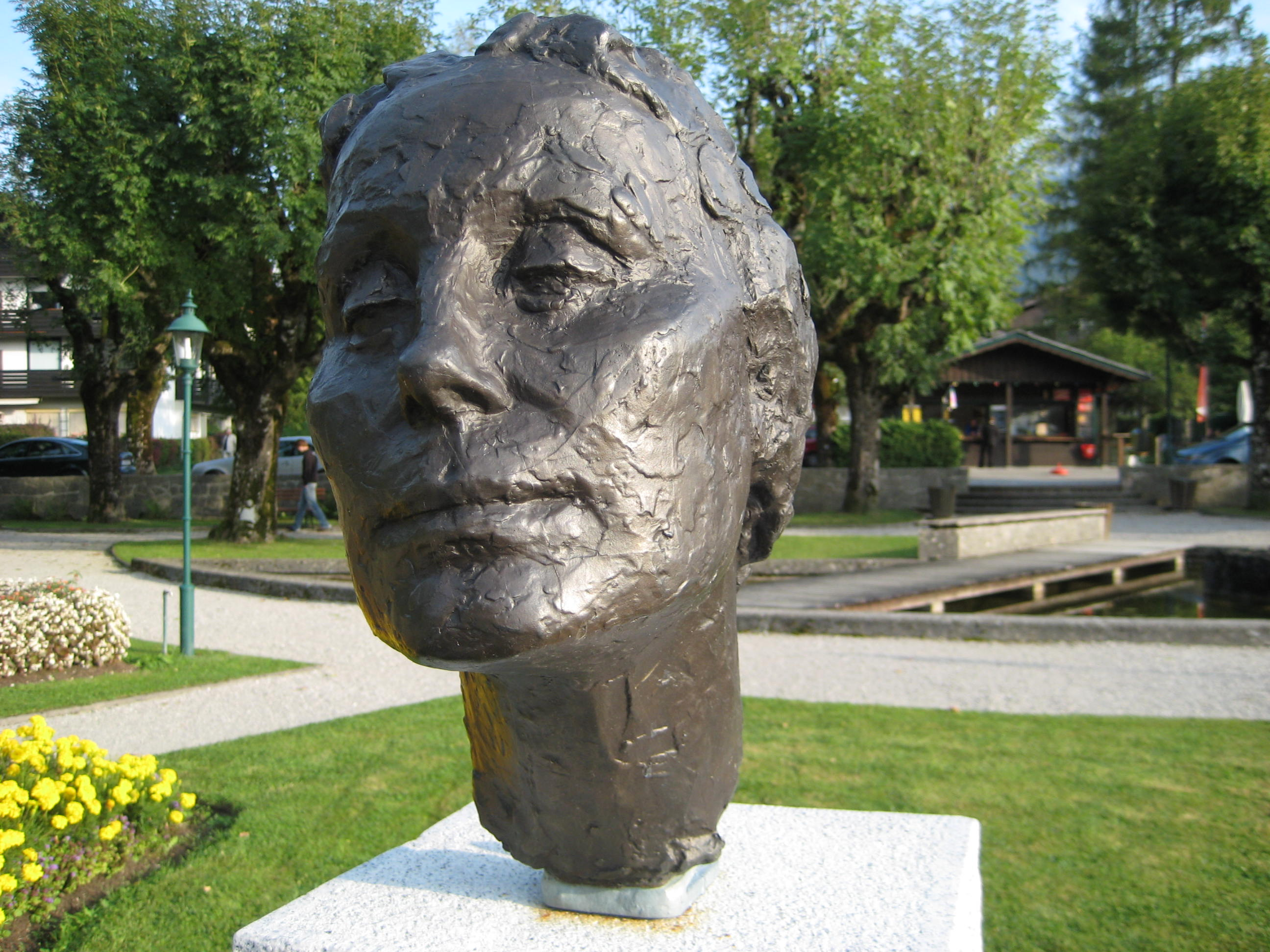
Bust of Helene Thimig on the lake promenade in Strobl

Helene Thimig was the daughter of actor Hugo Thimig and the sister of actors Hermann and Hans Thimig.

Thimig was married to the stage impresario Max Reinhardt from 1935 until his death in 1943. Thimig went into exile in the United States during the Nazi era, and returned to Europe after World War II.

== Professional life ==
Returning to Vienna from her American exile, she headed the Max Reinhardt Seminar, an acting school, from 1948 to 1954. Beginning in 1946, she directed the Jedermann productions during the Salzburg Festival. She had played the female lead (Faith) in that play for years under Reinhardt's direction and resumed the role from 1946 to 1951 and 1963 to 1965. She became an ensemble member at Vienna's Burgtheater in 1947; she moved to the Theater in the Josefstadt (her preferred company) in 1954.

She died in her native Vienna in 1974, aged 85, of heart failure. She was cremated at Feuerhalle Simmering; her ashes are now buried in Neustifter Friedhof in Vienna.

== Selected filmography ==
- Man Without a Name (1932) – Eva-Maria Sander
- The Gay Sisters (1942) – Saskia
- The Moon Is Down (1943) – Annie (uncredited)
- Edge of Darkness (1943) – Mrs. Frida Malken (uncredited)
- The Hitler Gang (1944) – Angela Raubal
- The Seventh Cross (1944) – Frau Anders (uncredited)
- Strangers in the Night (1944) – Mrs. Hilda Blake
- The Master Race (1944) – Matalie Rudan – George's Mother (uncredited)
- None But the Lonely Heart (1944) – Sister Nurse (uncredited)
- Roughly Speaking (1945) – Olga – Maid (uncredited)
- Hotel Berlin (1945) – Frau Sarah Baruch
- Isle of the Dead (1945) – Madame Kyra
- This Love of Ours (1945) – Mrs. Tucker
- Cloak and Dagger (1946) – Katerin Lodor
- The Locket (1946) – Mrs. Monks
- High Conquest (1947) – Frau Oberwalder
- Cry Wolf (1947) – Marta
- The Immortal Face (1947) – Henriette Feuerbach
- Escape Me Never (1947) – The Landlady
- Gottes Engel sind überall (1948) – Eine Dame in Grau
- The Angel with the Trumpet (1948) – Gretel Paskiewicz, geb. Alt
- Die Stimme Österreichs (1949) – Herself
- Decision Before Dawn (1951) – Fräulein Paula Schneider
- Undine (1955, TV movie)
- Das Mädchen vom Pfarrhof (1955) – Gerber-Leni, Sepps Mutter
- Winter in the Woods (1956) – Baronin Henny
- Die Magd von Heiligenblut (1956) – Kraeuter-Vetti
- Funken in der Asche (1962, TV movie) – Helene Langer
- Johann Wolfgang (1969, TV movie)

== Bibliography ==
- Sutter Fichtner, Paula. Historical Dictionary of Austria. Scarecrow Press, 2009.
