= Indlamu (dance) =

Traditional Zulu dance

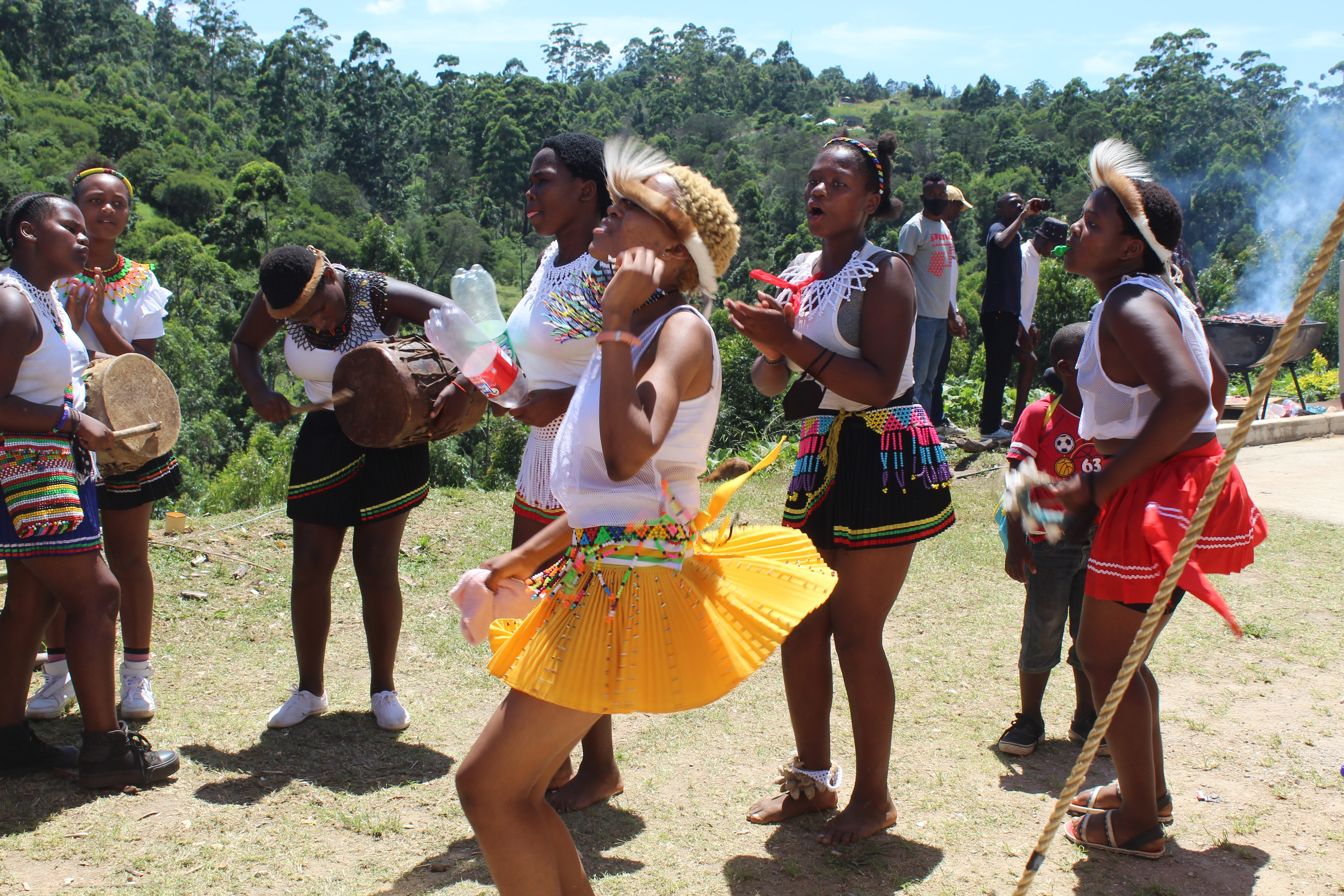
Indlamu traditional dance.

Indlamu (Zulu pronunciation: [ind͡ɮaːmu], Afrikaans: Zoeloedans) is a traditional Zulu dance from Southern Africa, synonymous with the Zulu tribe of South Africa and the Northern Ndebele tribe of Western Zimbabwe. The dance began as a war dance during the reign of King Shaka. The dance is characterised by the dancer lifting one foot over his/her head and bringing it down sharply, landing squarely on the downbeat. Typically, two dancers in warrior's pelts perform indlamu routines together, shadowing each other's moves perfectly. Historically, it was performed on numerous occasions, especially when warriors prepared for war or when a harvest was celebrated.
