= Hugo Thimig =

Austrian actor and theatre director (1854–1944)

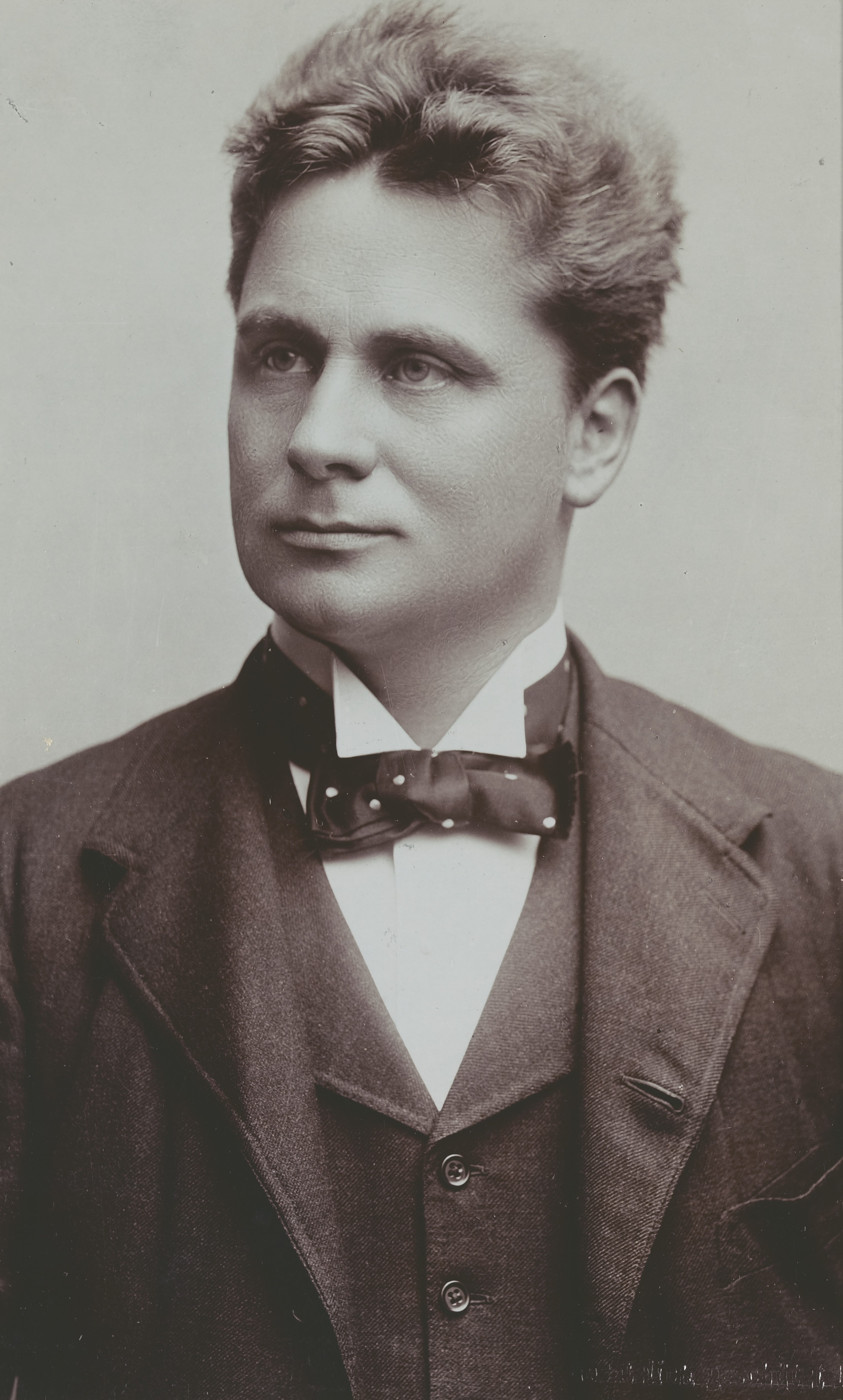
- Born: Hugo August Thimig; 16 June 1854; Dresden, German Confederation
- Died: 24 September 1944 (aged 90); Vienna, Nazi Germany
- Resting place: Sieveringer Cemetery, Vienna
- Occupations: Actor, theatre director
- Years active: 1874–1924
- Spouse: Franziska "Fanny" Hummel
- Children: Hermann Thimig; Friedrich Thimg; Helene Thimig; Hans Thimig

Hugo August Thimig (16 June 1854 – 24 September 1944) was a German actor, director, and the director of the Burgtheater in Vienna.

== Biography ==
Thimig was the founding father of one of Austria's most famous theatrical families, but was born in Dresden, the son of a shoemaker. He worked in a grocery store and attended a trade school before making several appearances on stage as an amateur in his home town. He made his professional debut in October 1872 in the town theatre of Bautzen. Within only two years, via the theatres in Zittau, Kamenz and Freiberg, Saxony, and the Lobe-Theater in Breslau, he obtained an engagement at the Burgtheater, and arrived in Vienna in 1874 to take it up. A week before his 20th birthday he gave his first performance there as Didier in Charlotte Birch-Pfeiffer's Die Grille.

Thimig began as a "shy lover" type, but soon developed into both comic and serious character roles, and his career soon took off. As early as 1881 he was appointed Hofrat, in 1897 he directed his first play, and from 1912 to 1917 he was also director of the Burgtheater, from which he had long since obtained a contract for life plus entitlement to a pension.

After his retirement in 1924 at the age of seventy he moved to the Theater in der Josefstadt, run by his future son-in-law Max Reinhardt, where he stayed until 1933, when he finally withdrew into private life, aged almost 80. The Theater in der Josefstadt was known in Vienna in the 1920s as the "Thimig Theatre", as besides the father, his three acting children were also engaged there: Helene Thimig, at first the partner and later the wife of Reinhardt, and her younger brother Hermann Thimig. The youngest of the three, Hans Thimig, joined them a little later. The entire family from then on worked in either the Burgtheater or the Theater in der Josefstadt.

Thimig was a passionate collector of theatrical items and memorabilia. His collection of documents and objects formed the basis of the collections of the Austrian Theatre Museum in the Palais Lobkowitz in Vienna.

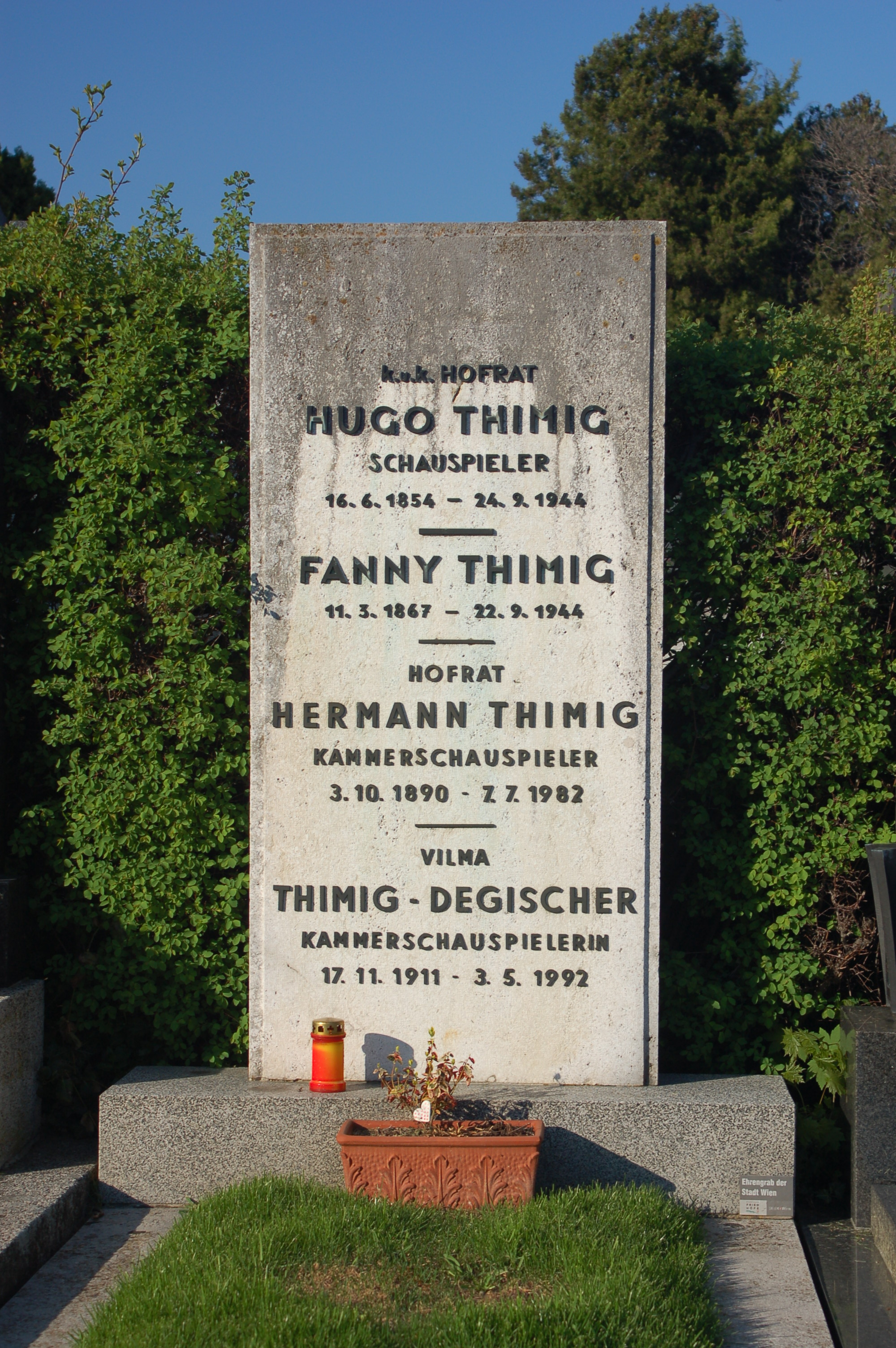
The graves of Hugo Thimg, his wife Franziska, son Hermann, and Hermann's wife, the actress Vilma Degischer, at the Sieveringer Cemetery in Vienna

On 24 September 1944, aged 90, he committed suicide by an overdose of Veronal. His wife Franziska (née Hummel) had died two days previously. He was buried next to his wife in the Sievering Cemetery in the 19th district of Vienna.

== Recognition ==
- 1942: Goethe-Medaille für Kunst und Wissenschaft, awarded by Adolf Hitler
- 1944: Ring of Honour of the City of Vienna (Ehrenring der Stadt Wien)
- Thimiggasse, a street in Währing, the 18th district of Vienna, is named after Hugo Thimig

== Selected filmography ==
- Clothes Make the Man (1921)
- Tales of Old Vienna (1923)
- Never the Twain (1926)
- Love in May (1928)
- Money on the Street (1930)
