= Joseph Suder =

German composer

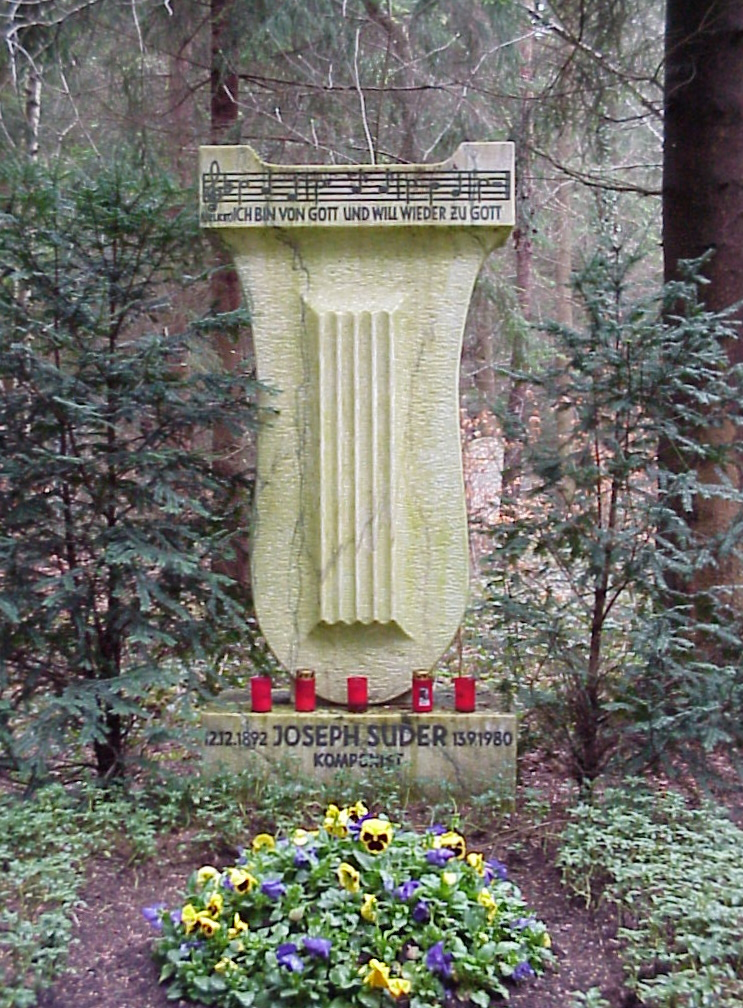
The Tomb of Joseph Suder

Joseph Suder (12 December 1892 – 13 September 1980) was a German composer. His opera Kleider machen Leute was composed 1926–34 but not performed until 1964.

In 1952, Suder created the Symphony Orchestra of Oskar von Miller-Polytechnic in Munich, which was passed down to his son, Alexander L. Suder.
