= Kleider machen Leute (opera) =

Opera by Alexander Zemlinsky

- Comic opera by Alexander von Zemlinsky
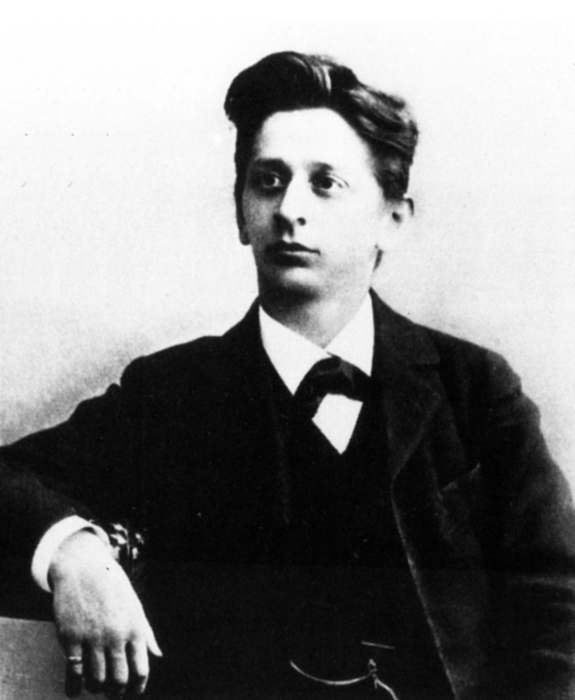
- The composer in 1908
- Translation: Clothes make the man
- Librettist: Leo Feld
- Language: German
- Based on: Kleider machen Leute by Gottfried Keller
- Premiere: 2 December 1910; Vienna Volksoper

Kleider machen Leute (Eng: Clothes make the man) is a comic opera by Austrian composer Alexander Zemlinsky. The libretto was written by Leo Feld, based on the 1874 novella of the same name by Gottfried Keller.

== Composition and performance history ==
Zemlinsky started work on the opera in 1907, and completed a three-act version in 1909. This was premiered at the Vienna Volksoper on 2 December 1910.

In 1913, for a projected production in Mannheim which never materialised, Zemlinsky made revisions. This version was given its belated premiere at the Stadttheater Cottbus in January 2025.

For a revival in Prague in 1922, Zemlinsky revised the work yet again, creating a version in two acts. This third and final version was premiered at the Neues Deutsches Theater in Prague on 20 April 1922.

The score was originally published by Bote & Bock but later acquired by Universal Edition Vienna.

== Roles ==
Toles, voice types, premiere casts
Role	Voice type	Premiere cast, first version Vienna, 2 December 1910	Premiere cast, third version Prague, 20 April 1922 Conductor: Alexander Zemlinsky
Wenzel Strapinski, a tailor's apprentice from Seldwyla	tenor		Richard Kubla
First tailor's apprentice, Wenzel's friend	tenor		Georg Kober
Second tailor's apprentice, Wenzel's friend	baritone		Elischa Czerner
Administrator (Der Amtsrat)	baritone		Heinrich Schönberg
Nettchen, his daughter	soprano		Maria Müller
Melchior Böhni	baritone		Max Klein
Kutscher	baritone		Max Irtener
Litumlei	bass		Karl Ludwik
Federspiel	tenor		Louis Laber
Häberlein	tenor		Ludwig von dem Bruch
Innkeeper	baritone		Berthold Sterneck
Pütschli	baritone		Adolf Fuchs
Prologus	spoken		Felix Kühne

== Synopsis (2-act version) ==
Prologue

On a provincial road, Wenzel Strapinski (a tailor's apprentice) is saying goodbye to two of his colleague friends. Suddenly, a magnificent carriage stops next to him. The coachman takes Wenzel to Goldach, introduces him there as a count, and then disappears.

Act 1

The citizens of Goldach admire the newcomer. The administrator and his daughter Nettchen join them. Only Melchior Böhni, who is in love with Nettchen but was rejected by her, is suspicious.

Act 2

Strapinski loves Nettchen, but is in two minds about the deceit. When he decides to leave, Nettchen stops him. His rival Böhni then exposes Strapinski as an impostor. Strapinski convinces the people of Goldach who treated him as a count that his only motive for playing along was his love for Nettchen. When he wants to leave, Nettchen stops him again, declaring that if she can not be a countess, she will gladly be the wife of a master tailor.

== Instrumentation ==
- 3 flutes (2nd and 3rd doubling piccolo), 3 oboes (3rd doubling cor anglais), 3 clarinets in B-flat/A (2nd doubling E-flat clarinet, 3rd doubling bass clarinet), 3 bassoons;
- 4 horns, 3 trumpets, 4 trombones, bass tuba;
- timpani, percussion (cymbals, bass drum, side drum, triangle, tambourine, sleigh bells, rute, xylophone, glockenspiel), harp, piano, celesta;
- strings

stage orchestra: clarinet in D, clarinet in B flat, 2 horns, trumpet, bass trombone, violin
