= Hermann Thimig =

Austrian actor (1890–1982)

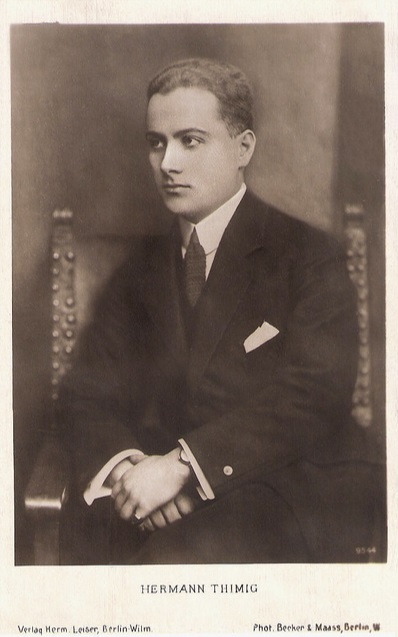
- Thimig in 1918
- Born: 3 October 1890; Vienna, Austria-Hungary
- Died: 7 July 1982 (aged 91); Vienna, Austria
- Occupation: Actor
- Years active: 1916–1967
- Spouse(s): Hanna Wisser; Vilma Degischer
- Children: 3, including actress Johanna Thimig
- Parent(s): Hugo Thimig; Franziska "Fanny" Hummel
- Relatives: Friedrich Thimig (brother); Helene Thimig (sister); Hans Thimig (brother)

Hermann Thimig (3 October 1890 – 7 July 1982) was an Austrian stage and film actor. He appeared in 102 films between 1916 and 1967.

== Biography ==
Thimig came from a famous family of actors. His father, Hugo Thimig, was an actor, director and director of the Vienna Burgtheater. His siblings Helene Thimig and Hans Thimig, with whom he trained at the theater and worked together several times in films, were accomplished actors.

During his early days in elementary school and high school in Vienna, and in various land reform schools, Thimig performed with amateur theater groups and private performances. After military service as a one-year volunteer in Vienna he made his debut in December 1910 at the Meiningen Court Theatre and remained there until his contract was disrupted in 1914 by the outbreak of the First World War.

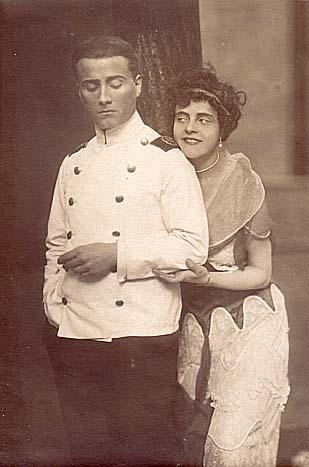
Hermann Thimig and Mady Christians appear in the stage operetta Eifersucht.

In 1915 due to severe Furunculosis (boils), he was declared unfit for the front.

While on duty he used his home leave to the Royal Theater in Berlin to make guest appearances and played first at the Volksbühne. A change to the Max Reinhardt's ensemble at the Deutsches Theater was the breakthrough for Thimig 1916. In the same year he made his debut in the film The Countess Heyers and was co-star of Ossi Oswalda and Henny Porten. In 1918 he directed for the first time at the Theatre of the West in Berlin. He starred in three films of Ernst Lubitsch, including the 1921 The Wildcat.

With the advent of sound film, Thimig turned away from the stage and worked mainly in film operettas and comedies. In the mid-1930s he primarily held roles of older. After the Anschluss of Austria, he was a 1938 State Actors nominee.

In the final stages of World War II, Adolf Hitler himself declared in the Gottbegnadeten list of the most important artists, that Thimig was a national treasure making him, even on the home front, freed from the war effort.

In 1965 he was made an honorary member of the Burgtheater and 1969 he received the Film Award for many years of excellent work in the German film. In 1981 he was awarded the Honorary Ring of the City of Vienna.

Thimig had three children. His first, a daughter, from his marriage to actress Hanna (Guy) Thimig. From his second marriage to actress Vilma Degischer (1911–1992) he also had two daughters.

Hermann Thimig rests in an honorary dedicated grave in the Sievering Cemetery (Dept. 2, Group 13, Number 76) in Vienna. His second wife, Vilma Degischer, was buried with him ten years later.

== Filmography ==
- Die Gräfin Heyers (1916)
- Tragödie eines Staatsanwalts (1917)
- Ossi’s Tagebuch(1917)
- Put to the Test (1918)
- Agnes Arnau and Her Three Suitors (1918)
- Freie Liebe (1919)
- Die schwarze Locke (1919)
- The Bride of the Incapacitated (1919)
- The Commandment of Love (1919)
- Her Sport (1919)
- Moral und Sinnlichkeit (1919)
- The Foolish Heart (1919)
- Der Sohn der Magd (1919)
- Countess Doddy (1919)
- The Doll (1919)
- Das Mädchen aus dem wilden Westen (1919)
- The Brothers Karamazov (1920)
- Zwischen den Dreien (1920)
- The Golden Crown (1920)
- Rebel Liesel (1920)
- Clothes Make the Man (1921)
- Hannerl and Her Lovers (1921)
- Mein Leben als Nachtredakteur (1921)
- The Wildcat (1921)
- The Adventure of Doctor Kircheisen (1921)
- The Sins of the Mother (1921)
- Die Küsse der Ira Toscari (1922)
- The Curse of Silence (1922)
- Barmaid (1922)
- The Girl with the Mask (1922)
- She and the Three (1922)
- The Stream (1922)
- The Flame (1922)
- Thou Shalt Not Kill (1923)
- The Woman on the Panther (1923)
- All for Money (1923)
- The Lost Shoe (1923)
- Leap Into Life (1924)
- The Radio Marriage (1924)
- The Uninvited Guest (1925)
- Dancing Mad (1925)
- The Family without Morals (1927)
- Madame Dares an Escapade (1927)
- Napoleon at Saint Helena (1929)
- The Immortal Vagabond (1930)
- The Private Secretary (1931)
- The Threepenny Opera (1931)
- L'Opéra de quat'sous (1931)
- When the Soldiers (1931)
- The Little Escapade (1931)
- I'll Stay with You (1931)
- The Office Manager (1931)
- My Leopold (1931)
- My Friend the Millionaire (1932)
- Two Heavenly Blue Eyes (1932)
- A Bit of Love (1932)
- A Night in Paradise (1932)
- Girls to Marry (1932)
- Kiki (1932)
- Traum von Schönbrunn (1932)
- The Blue of Heaven (1932)
- Overnight Sensation (1932)
- A City Upside Down (1933)
- Marion, That's Not Nice (1933)
- Little Man, What Now? (1933)
- Die Fahrt ins Grüne (1933)
- Victor and Victoria (1933)
- The Gentleman Without a Residence (1934)
- Karneval und Liebe (1934)
- Liebe dumme Mama (1934)
- A Precocious Girl (1934)
- Die Fahrt in die Jugend (1935)
- Peter, Paul and Nanette (1935)
- Die törichte Jungfrau (1935)
- Heaven on Earth (1935)
- Dance Music (1935)
- The White Horse Inn (1935)
- The Mysterious Mister X (1936)
- Die Austernlilli (1937)
- Eine Frau für Drei (1939)
- Brüderlein fein (1942)
- Die kluge Marianne (1943)
- Johann (1943)
- Love Letters (1944)
- Die goldene Fessel (1944)
- Ein Blick zurück (1944)
- Wie ein Dieb in der Nacht (1945)
- Praterbuben (1946)
- The Trial (1948)
- Mysterious Shadows (1949)
- Bonus on Death (1950)
- Die Wirtin zum roten Ochsen (1951)
- Das unmögliche Mädchen (1951)
- Ich hab mich so an dich gewöhnt (1952)
- Abenteuer im Schloss (1952)
- A Night in Venice (1953)
- The Eternal Waltz (1954)
- Die Magd von Heiligenblut (1956)
- Eine Reise ins Glück (1958)
- When the Bells Sound Clearly (1959)
- Frau Irene Besser (1961)
- Romance in Venice (1962)
- Die vergessenen Jahre (1962)
- Der Arzt wider Willen (1967)
