= Clothes Make the Man (1940 film) =

1940 film directed by Helmut Käutner

- German film poster
- German: Kleider machen Leute
- Directed by: Helmut Käutner
- Written by: Helmut Käutner
- Based on: Clothes Make the Man by Gottfried Keller
- Produced by: Artur Kiekebusch-Brenken
- Starring: Heinz Rühmann; Hertha Feiler; Hilde Sessak
- Cinematography: Ewald Daub
- Edited by: Helmuth Schönnenbeck
- Music by: Bernhard Eichhorn
- Production company: Terra Film
- Distributed by: Terra Film
- Release date: 16 September 1940
- Running time: 91 minutes
- Country: Germany
- Language: German

Clothes Make the Man (German: Kleider machen Leute) is a 1940 German historical comedy film directed by Helmut Käutner and starring Heinz Rühmann, Hertha Feiler and Hilde Sessak. The film is based on the Novella Kleider machen Leute, published by realist author Gottfried Keller in 1874. It was shot at the Barrandov Studios in German-occupied Prague as well as at the Babelsberg and Tempelhof Studios in Berlin.

== Cast ==
- Heinz Rühmann as Wenzel
- Hertha Feiler as Annette "Nettchen" Putschli
- Hilde Sessak as Amalia von Serafin
- Fritz Odemar as Count Stroganoff
- Rudolf Schündler as Melchior Böhni, the tailor
- Franz Stein as Herr Putschli
- Hans Stiebner as the innkeeper
- Helmut Weiss as Herr Häberlin
- Aribert Wäscher as Herr Nievergelt
- Hans Sternberg as the district administrator
- Franz Weber as Huerli, the master-tailor
- Erwin Hoffmann as Wenzel's Fellow Seamster
- Erich Ponto as Christoffel
- Leopold von Ledebur as the mayor
- Olga Limburg as Amalia's chaperone
- Joe Furtner as the coachman
- Klaus Pohl as the beggar

== Release ==
The film was released in the USA only in 1958, in German but with no subtitles.

== Reception ==
Thomas Kramer of the Reclams Lexikon of the German Films
