= Gottfried Keller =

Swiss poet and writer

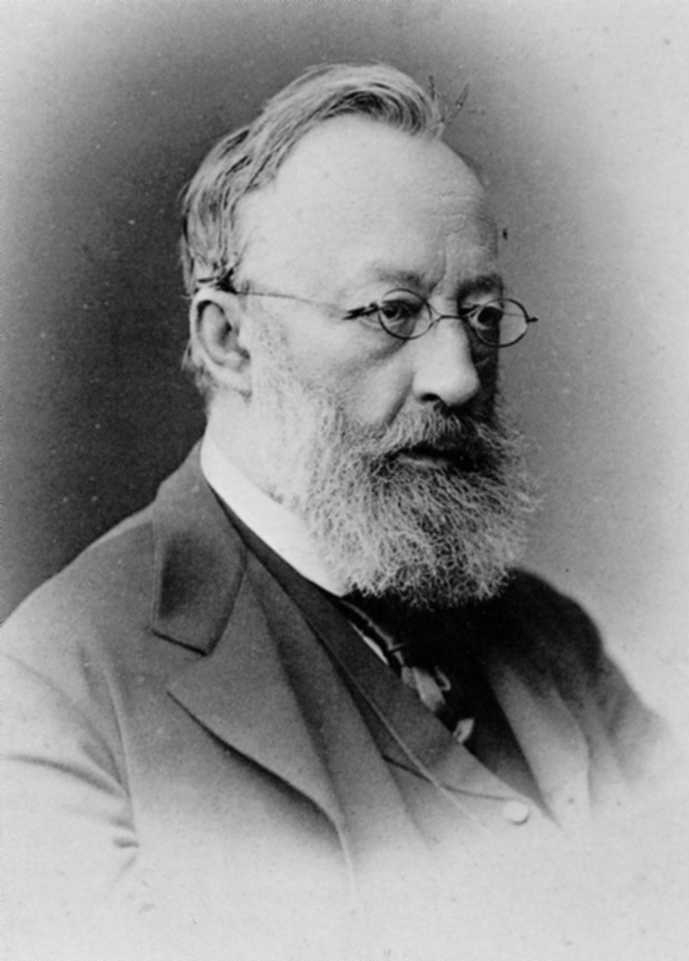
- Keller around 1885
- Born: 19 July 1819; Zürich, Switzerland
- Died: 15 July 1890 (aged 70); Zürich, Switzerland

Gottfried Keller (19 July 1819 – 15 July 1890) was a Swiss poet and writer of German literature. Best known for his novel Green Henry (German: Der grüne Heinrich) and his cycle of novellas called Seldwyla Folks (Die Leute von Seldwyla), he became one of the most popular narrators of literary realism in the late 19th century.

== Early life ==
His father was Rudolf Keller (1791–1824), a lathe-worker from Glattfelden; his mother was a woman named Elisabeth Scheuchzer (1787–1864). The couple had six children, four of whom died, meaning Keller only had his sister Regula (*1822) left. After his father died of tuberculosis, Keller's family lived in constant poverty, and, because of Keller's difficulties with his teachers, in continual disagreement with school authorities. Keller later gave a good rendering of his experiences in this period in his long novel, Der grüne Heinrich (1850–55; 2nd version, 1879). His mother seems to have brought him up in as carefree a condition as possible, sparing for him from her scanty meals, and allowing him the greatest possible liberty in the disposition of his time, the choice of a calling, etc. With some changes, a treatment of her relations to him may be found in his short story, "Frau Regel Amrain und ihr jüngster" (in the collection Die Leute von Seldwyla).

== Career ==
Keller's first true passion was painting. Expelled in a political mix-up from the Industrieschule in Zürich, he became an apprentice in 1834 to the landscape painter Steiger and in 1837 to the watercolourist Rudolf Meyer (1803–1857). In 1840, he went to Munich (Bavaria) to study art for a time at the Royal Academy of Fine Arts.

Keller returned to Zürich in 1842 and, although possessing artistic talent, took up writing. He published his first poems, Gedichte, in 1846. Jacob Wittmer Hartmann characterises these six years at Zürich (1842–48) as a time of almost total inactivity, when Keller inclined strongly toward radical politics, and was also subject to too much temptation and indulged himself. From 1848 to 1850 he studied at the University of Heidelberg. There he came under the influence of the philosopher Feuerbach, and extended his radicalism also to matters of religion.

From 1850 to 1856, he worked in Berlin. Hartmann claims it was chiefly this stay in Berlin which moulded Keller's character into its final shape, toned down his rather bitter pessimism to a more moderate form, and prepared him (not without the privations of hunger), in the whirl of a large city, for an enjoyment of the more restricted pleasures of his native Zürich. It was in Berlin that he turned definitely away from other pursuits and took up literature as a career.

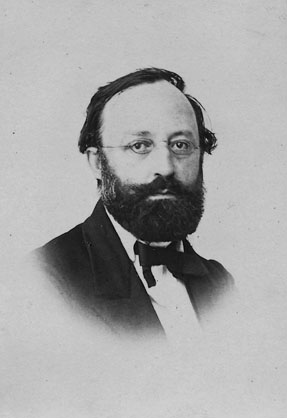
Gottfried Keller in 1860

In this period, Keller published the semi-autobiographical novel Der grüne Heinrich (Green Henry). It is the most personal of all his works. Under the influence of Jean-Jacques Rousseau's doctrine of a return to nature, this book was at first intended to be a short narrative of the collapse of the life of a young artist. It expanded as its composition progressed into a huge work drawing on Keller's youth and career (or more precisely non-career) as a painter up to 1842. Its reception by the literary world was cool, but the second version of 1879 is a rounded and satisfying artistic product.

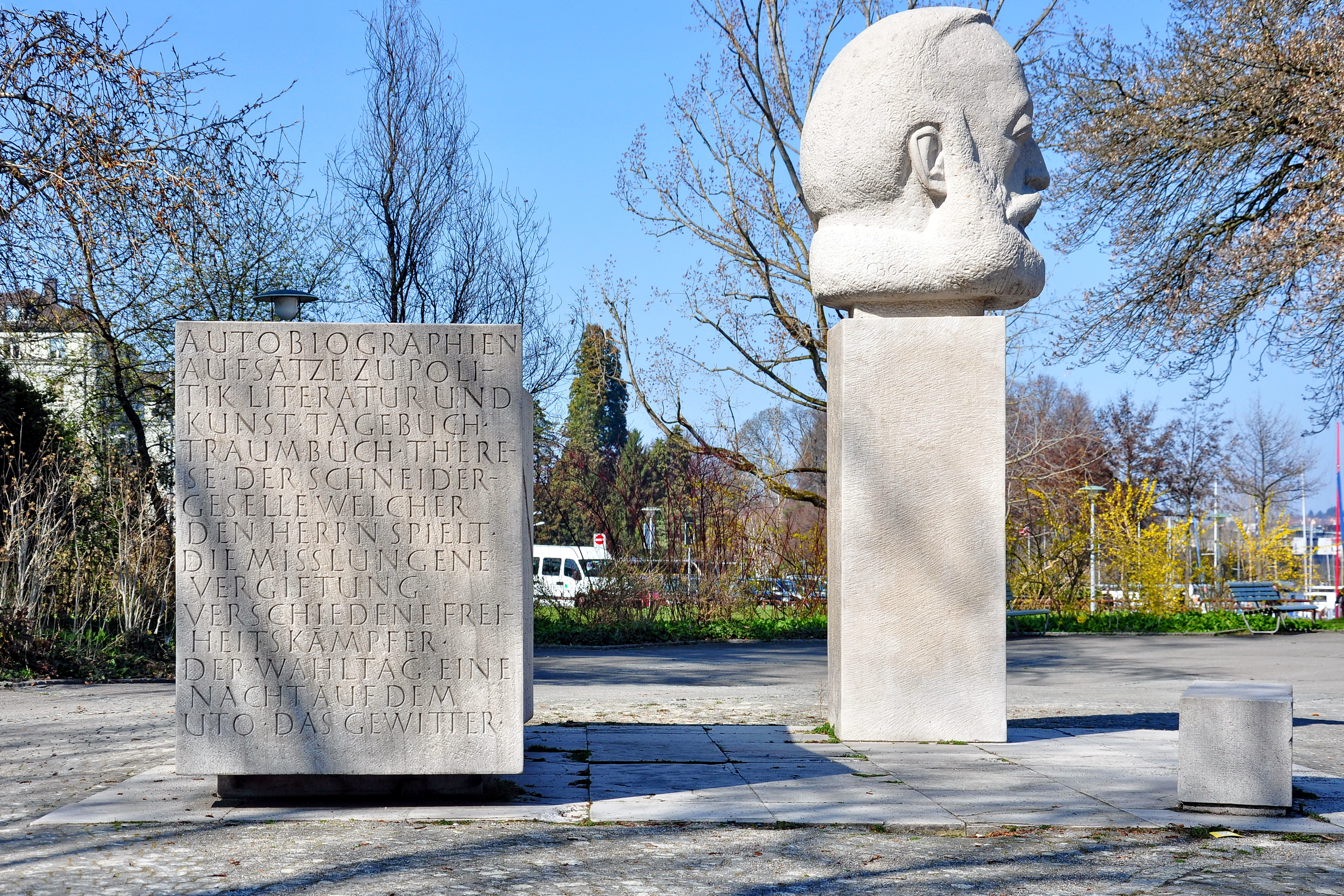
Gottfried Keller memorial at Enge (Zürich) harbour

He also published his first collection of short stories, Seldwyla Folks (German: Die Leute von Seldwyla). It contains five stories averaging 60 pages each: "Pankraz der Schmoller," "Frau Regel Amrain und ihr jüngster," "Die drei gerechten Kammacher," "Romeo und Julia auf dem Dorfe," and "Spiegel das Kätzchen." Hartmann characterizes two of the stories in Seldwyla Folks as immortal: "Die drei gerechten Kammacher" he views as the most satirical and scorching attack on the sordid petit bourgeois morality ever penned by any writer, and "Romeo und Julia auf dem Dorfe" as one of the most pathetic tales in literature (Shakespeare's Romeo and Juliet plot in a Swiss village setting).

Keller returned again to Zürich and became the First Official Secretary of the Canton of Zürich (Erster Zürcher Staatsschreiber) in 1861. The routine duties of this position were a sort of fixed point about which his artistic activities could revolve, but Hartmann opines that he produced little of permanent value in these years. In 1872, Keller published Seven Legends (Sieben Legenden), which dealt with the early Christian era. After 15 years at this post, he was retired in 1876, and began a period of literary activity that was to last to his death, living the life of an old bachelor with his sister Regula as his housekeeper. In spite of his often unsympathetic manner, his extreme reserve and idiosyncrasy in dealing with others, he had gained the affection of his fellow townspeople and an almost universal reputation before his death.

== Evaluation ==
Hartmann bases Keller's fame chiefly on 15 short stories, the five mentioned above; the five contained in the second volume of Seldwyla Folks (1874): "Die missbrauchten Liebesbriefe," "Der Schmied seines Glücks," "Dietegen," "Kleider machen Leute," and "Das verlorene Lachen"; and five in Züricher Novellen (1878): "Hadlaub," "Der Narr auf Manegg," "Der Landvogt von Greifensee," "Das Fähnlein der sieben Aufrechten," and "Ursula." The milieu is always that of an orderly bourgeois existence, within which the most manifold human destinies, the most humorous relations develop, the most peculiar and hardy types of endurance and reticence are manifested. Some of the stories contained a note that was new in German literature and that endeared them particularly to Germans as embodying an ideal as yet unrealized in their own country: they narrate the development of character under the relatively free conditions of little Switzerland, portraying an unbureaucratic civic life and an independence of business initiative.

Also, noteworthy are his Collected Poetry (Gesammelte Gedichte) (1883), and the novel Martin Salander (1886).

== Gottfried Keller Foundation ==
In 1890, shortly before the end of her tragic life, Lydia Escher (1858–1891) invested the Escher fortune in a foundation which she named after Gottfried Keller, to whom her father gave consistent support. With her remaining substantial asset – Villa Belvoir including swing and marketable securities totaling nominally 4 million Swiss Francs – Lydia Escher established the foundation's base. According to the will of Lydia Escher, the foundation was established on 6 June 1890, and was managed by the Swiss Federal Council, thus, Lydia Escher wished to accomplish a patriotic work. The foundation should also promote the "independent work of women, at least in the field of the applied Arts," according to the original intention of the founder. This purpose was adopted but at the urging of Emil Welti not in the deed of the foundation. The Gottfried Keller Foundation became though an important collection institution for art, but the feminist concerns of Lydia Escher were not met.

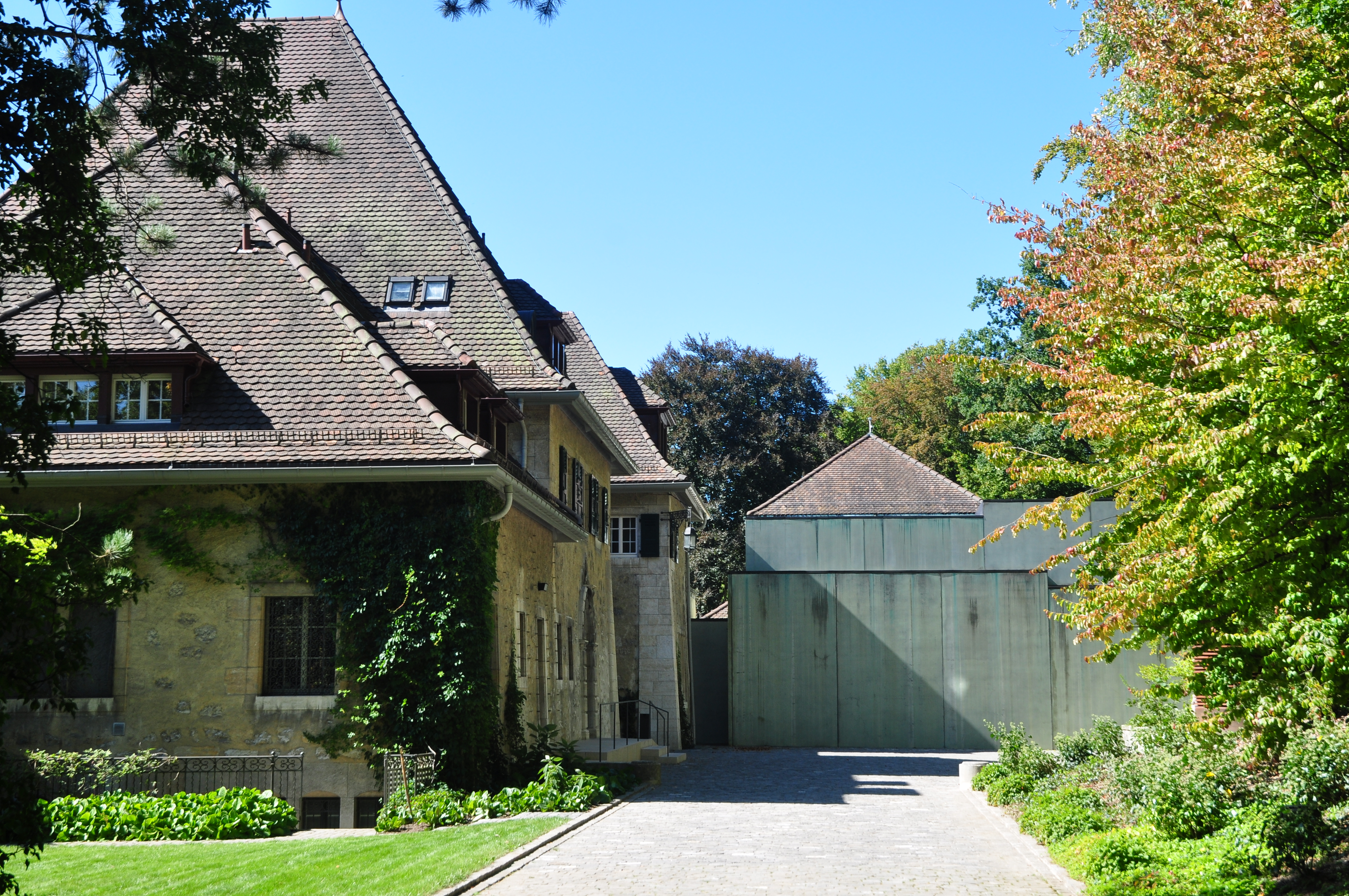
Foundation in Winterthur

The foundation, as of today based in Winterthur, is listed as a Swiss inventory of cultural property of national and regional significance.

The 200th anniversary of Keller's birth was celebrated in 2019 with a substantial biography by Ulrich Kittstein.

== Works in English translation ==
- Legends of Long Ago (1911, translated by Charles Hart Handschin).
- Seldwyla Folks (1919, translated by Wolf von Schierbrand).
  - The People of Seldwyla, and Seven Legends (1970, translated by M.D. Hottinger).
- A Village Romeo and Juliet (1952).
- Green Henry (1960, translated by A.M. Holt).
- Martin Salander (1963, translated by Kenneth Halwas).
- Two Stories (1966, edited by Lionel Thomas).
- The Banner of the Upright Seven, and Ursula; Two Novellas (1974, translated by Bayard Quincy Morgan).
- The Misused Love Letters & Regula Amrain and Her Youngest Son; Two Novellas (1974, translated by Anne Fremantle and Michael Bullock).
- Perspectives on People: Five Stories (1977, translated by Lawrence M. Washington).
- Stories (1982, edited by Frank G. Ryder).

== See also ==
- A Village Romeo and Juliet, an opera by Frederick Delius
- Gottfried-Keller-Preis
- Lyric poetry
- Notturno, a 1933 song cycle by Othmar Schoeck which concludes with a setting of Keller's poem "Heerwagen, mächtig Sternbild der Germanen"
