= Annie Vivanti =

Italian poet and writer

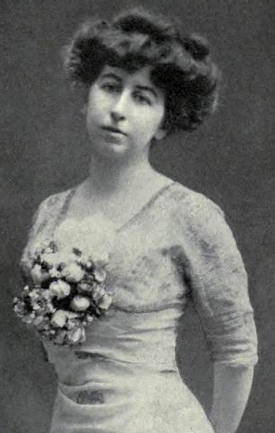
- Annie Vivanti, from a 1910 publication.
- Born: Anna Emilia Vivanti; 7 April 1866; London, England
- Died: 20 February 1942 (aged 75); Turin, Italy
- Occupation: writer
- Spouse: John Smith Chartres (m. 1892; died 1927)
- Children: Vivien Chartres
- Parents: Anselmo Vivanti (father); Anna Lindau (mother)

Anna Emilia "Annie" Vivanti Chartres (7 April 1866 – 20 February 1942), also known as Anita Vivanti or Anita Vivanti Chartres, was a British-born Italian writer.

== Life and career ==
The daughter of Anselmo Vivanti, an Italian exile of Jewish descent, and Anna Lindau, a German writer, she was born in London. Her mother's brothers were Paul and Rudolf Lindau. Her father, a follower of Mazzini, found political asylum in the British capital after the 1851 uprisings in Mantova. Anselmo, a major silk trader, was president of the Società Reduci dalle Patrie Battaglie and of the Italian Chamber of Commerce of New York. She grew up in Italy, England, Switzerland and the United States. In 1890, she published Lirica, a poetry collection, with a preface by Giosuè Carducci. The following year, she published a novel Marion artista di caffè concerto.

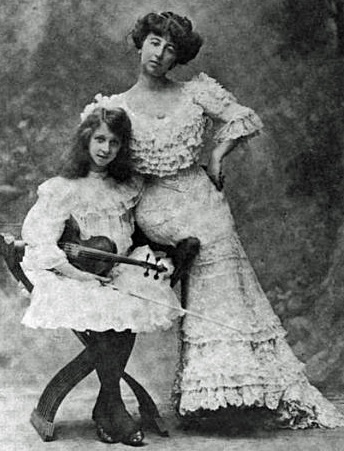
With her daughter, Vivien Chartres

In 1892, she married the Anglo-Irish journalist and lawyer John Smith Chartres. For the next 18 years, she lived in England and the US, and wrote only in English. Her most famous work of this period is The Devourers, published in 1910, which was inspired by her daughter, Vivien Chartres, a violin prodigy. She rewrote the book in Italian as I divoratori in 1911.

Like her husband, who was a member of Sinn Féin, Vivanti supported Irish independence, writing articles for a number of different newspapers and journals, and assisting the Irish delegation in Versailles in 1919. She also defended the Italian cause in English newspapers during World War I. Following the war, she supported Mussolini and contributed to Italian nationalist newspapers such as Il Popolo d'Italia and L'Idea Nazionale.

In 1941, living in Italy, she was placed under house arrest because of her connections to England; for a time, her books were banned in Italy because of her Jewish parentage. Some sources claim her daughter Vivien committed suicide in London later that same year, although it appears Vivien was killed during an air raid in London in 1941. Shortly before her own death in Turin the following year, Annie Vivanti Chartres converted to Roman Catholicism.

== Poetic ==
"The encounter between cultures, languages, different nationalities and religions constitutes the exceptional nature of Annie Vivanti's life and literature experience, unique in the Italian context. Born and raised in direct contact with the English, Italian, German and American, Annie assimilated and merged those different cultural and spiritual components, filtering them through the lens of an all-Latin sentimentality but also of a purely Anglo-Saxon pragmatism which in her are exalted and summarized".

Her husband John Chartres, businessman and journalist, but also sinnfeiner activist for Irish independence, added a component of political passion in Annie's life - who had already received the imprint of her father's example - which led her, in the years of maturity, to take an active part in Irish and Italian political events, in an irredentist way, against the status quo imposed by the great nations, mainly by England.

"Great traveler, fully inserted in the contexts in which she lived, ordering her own reality, Annie Vivanti always had a contradictory sentiment towards England - the country where she was born and of which she always remained a citizen - she felt congenial to American life and mentality, but he chose Italy as his homeland. However, any attribution of a national nature is reductive due to its stateless and multifaceted temperament: Annie Vivanti in Italy, Annie Vivanti Chartres in Europe, Anita Vivanti Chartres - or just Anita Chartres - in the United States, the different images she offered of herself to her many audiences fully symbolize her volage volage, which is embodied in the only space-time dimension that is congenial to it, the "here and now", a continuous present without roots, without projections or perspectives, a perpetual and airy movement that gives his work a sense of freshness and spontaneous immediacy, allowing her to offer the reader a series of thrilling and emotionally engaging impressions that find the happiest results in short stories and stories. Annie Vivanti does not belong to a single literary genre nor does she approach a specific cultural movement, given also its internationality and disorderly formation".

== Selected works ==
=== English ===
- That Man, play (1899, Herald Square Theatre)
- The Devourers, novel (1910)
- Circe, novel (1912)
- Marie Tarnowska, novel (1915)

=== Italian ===
- L'Invasore, play (1916)
- Vae victis!, novel (1917)
- Le bocche inutili, play (1918)
- Zingaresca, short stories (1918)
- Naja tripudians (1920)
- Fosca, sorella di Messalina (1922)

== Sources ==
- Sharon Wood, Erica Moretti, eds. Annie Chartres Vivanti: Transnational Politics, Identity, and Culture. Madison Farleigh

Dickinson University Press, 2016. 312 pp. $95.00 (cloth), ISBN 978-1-68393-006-8.
