= Vivien Chartres =

British violinist (1893–1941)

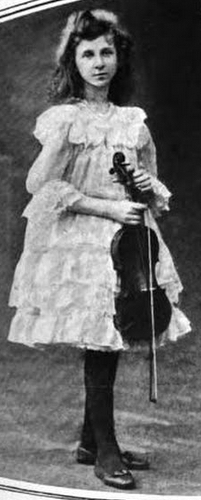
- Chartres, from a 1906 publication.
- Born: 25 June 1893; Turin, Italy
- Died: 1 September 1941 (aged 48); Hove, Sussex, England
- Other names: Vivienne Chartres, Vivien Chartres Burns, Vivien Chartres Young, Vivien Burns Young
- Occupation: Violinist
- Years active: 1904–1913
- Known for: Child musical prodigy
- Spouses: Arthur Lindsey Burns (m. 1915; died 1925) Richard C.R. Young (m. 1927; died 1941)
- Children: 2

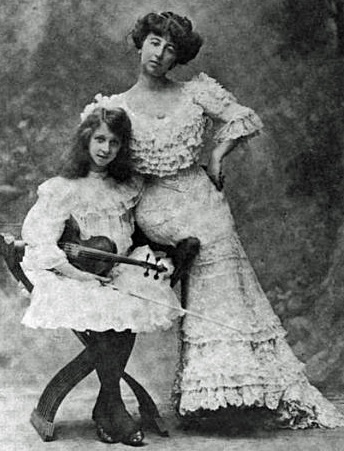
Chartres with her mother, Annie Vivanti

Vivien Chartres (25 June 1893 – 1 September 1941) was a British violinist and child musical prodigy, daughter of writer Annie Vivanti, whose novel The Devourers (1910) was inspired by the life of Vivien Chartres.

== Early life ==
Vivien Chartres was born in Turin, Italy, the daughter of Anglo-Irish lawyer, journalist, and Sinn Féin activist John Smith Chartres (1862–1927), and English-born Italian writer Annie Vivanti (1866–1942); her mother was the niece of German writers Paul Lindau and Rudolf Lindau. Vivien Chartres began playing the violin as a girl, and was taken to Prague to study with Otakar Ševčík when she was ten years old.

== Career ==
Chartres gave a recital at the Queen's Hall, London, in 1904, during the same week as appearances by Marie Hall, Mischa Elman, and other child violinists. "To hear this small dot attack the G minor concerto by Bruch and the Moïse fantasie was something of a revelation," commented one reviewer. Her mother and manager exaggerated her youth, and publicized her as being nine, rather than eleven, years old. Critics scolded Vivanti for allowing the child to be overworked and overexposed. Charged under a new law meant to prevent the exploitation of very young children, her mother and manager were fined, and the manager, Narciso Vert, died in June 1905, from a heart attack attributed to the stress. Vivien Chartres appeared at Queen's Hall again in 1906.

Chartres shared the bill with Harry Lauder, Violet Vanbrugh, Ellaline Terriss and other performers, at a benefit concert to raise relief funds following the Courrières mine disaster in 1906; then she returned to the continent and once performed for Queen Margherita. She played for Edward VII at Marienbad.

In 1907, a diary appeared in The Pall Mall Magazine under Vivien's name, describing her pets, her music, and her everyday activities. She played in Sheffield with pianist Irene Scharrer in December 1907, and in Huddersfield in January 1908, with pianist Mark Hambourg.

In 1910, Vivanti's novel The Devourers was published, a fictionalized account of the mother-daughter pair in their pursuits of music and freedom. She rewrote it in Italian for publication the following year, as I divoratori (1911). The book was dedicated to Vivien, "to read when she has wonderchildren of her own". "Overtly, Vivanti claims that a genius child devours its mother," observes one recent literary scholar. "More obliquely, she shows how the mothers devour their child as well."

== Personal life ==
Vivien Chartres married businessman Arthur Lindsey Burns in 1915. They had two children, Vivien Anne-Marie, born 1916, and Cecil, born 1917, before Arthur Burns died in 1925. She remarried in 1927, to Sir Richard C. R. Young. The Youngs and Annie Vivanti met with Benito Mussolini in 1927, while they lived in Rome, Italy.

Vivien Chartres Young died in Hove, Sussex, in 1941, by suicide, along with her husband; his failing health led her to write: "I cannot go on...We shall go together, quietly and peacefully." Her mother died the following year.
