= Nicolas Farkas =

Hungarian-born American filmmaker (1890–1982)

- Farkas Miklós
- Born: 27 July 1890; Margitta, Austria-Hungary
- Died: 22 March 1982 (aged 91); New York, U.S.
- Other names: Farkas, Miklós, Miklós Farkas, Mikolaus Farkas, Nikolaus Farkas, Nikolas Farkas
- Occupations: Cinematographer, Screenwriter, Film director, Producer

Nicolas Farkas (July 27, 1890, in Margitta, Austro-Hungarian Empire – March 22, 1982, in New York) was a Hungarian-born cinematographer, screenwriter, producer and film director. He is also known as Farkas Miklós, Miklós Farkas, Mikolaus Farkas, Nikolaus Farkas and Nikolas Farkas.

== Early years and career in Europe ==
After studying in Budapest, Farkas went to Vienna in 1919 and trained as a cinematographer. He worked for the Austrian film industry until 1924. During the 1920s he collaborated frequently with another Hungarian famous film directors and producers such as Sándor Korda and Mihály Kertész.

In 1925 Farkas started working in Germany. Individual projects also took him to the Soviet Union and Poland. Among his last important German projects was Berlin - Alexanderplatz (1931, directed by Phil Jutzi).

After 1933 he worked in France, where he was also active as a screenwriter. He also worked there on a number of international co-productions, and in 1934 he made his debut as a film director with the Anglo-French melodrama The Battle. He also worked as cinematographer on G.W. Pabst's 1933 film Adventures of Don Quixote.

== Career in the United States ==
In 1941 he emigrated to the United States, where he participated in propaganda short films for the US Navy. He then lived permanently in New York, where he ran his own small production company, Farkas Films Inc.

== Filmography ==
The following filmography contains, in chronological order, all of Farkas' work as a cinematographer, film director, screenwriter and film producer.

=== Cinematographer ===
- Samson and Delilah (1922)
- Gypsy Love (1922)
- Miss Madame (1923)
- Children of the Revolution (1923)
- Tragedy in the House of Habsburg (1924)
- The Curse (1924)
- Zirkus Brown (1924)
- L'Esclave reine (1924)
- The Morals of the Alley (1925)
- The Revenge of the Pharaohs (1925)
- Dancing Mad (1925)
- Nick, King of the Chauffeurs (1925)
- Countess Maritza (1925)
- Love in May (1928)
- Kira Kiralina (1928)
- The Case of Prosecutor M (1928)
- The Schorrsiegel Affair (1928)
- The Three Kings (1928)
- The Ship of Lost Souls (1929)
- Crucified Girl (1929)
- Phantoms of Happiness (1929)
- The Alley Cat (1929)
- The White Roses of Ravensberg (1929)
- Exile to Siberia (1930)
- Love in the Ring (1930)
- The Prosecutor Hallers (1930)
- Money on the Street (1930)
- The Right to Love (1930)
- The Other (1930)
- The Comeback (1930)
- Der Andere – as Nikolaus Farkas (1930)
- Zwei Krawatten (1930)
- Danton (1931)
- The Firm Gets Married (1931)
- Berlin-Alexanderplatz (1931)
- The Brothers Karamazov (1931)
- Bric-à-brac et compagnie (1931)
- Madame Makes Her Exit (1932)
- Amourous Adventure (1932)
- A Telephone Call (1932)
- Adventures of Don Quixote (1933)
- L'Inconnu d'un soir (1949)

=== Director ===
- The Battle (1934)
- Variety (1935)
- Port Arthur (1936)
- I Give My Life (1936)

=== Screenwriter ===
- La bataille – dialogue (1933)
- The Battle (Thunder in the East) – screenplay (1934)
- Varieté (1935)
- Three Maxims (1936)
- The Show Goes On - story (1936)
- I Give My Life - scenario (1936)
- Port Arthur (1936)

=== Producer ===
- Feu! (1937)
- The Patriot (1938)

== Bibliography ==
- Low, Rachael. History of the British Film: Filmmaking in 1930s Britain. George Allen & Unwin, 1985 .
- Kay Weniger: Das große Personenlexikon des Films. Die Schauspieler, Regisseure, Kameraleute, Produzenten, Komponisten, Drehbuchautoren, Filmarchitekten, Ausstatter, Kostümbildner, Cutter, Tontechniker, Maskenbildner und Special Effects Designer des 20. Jahrhunderts. Band 2: C – F. John Paddy Carstairs – Peter Fitz. Schwarzkopf & Schwarzkopf, Berlin 2001, ISBN 3-89602-340-3
- Oscherwitz, Dayna & Higgins, MaryEllen. The A to Z of French Cinema. Scarecrow Press, 2009.
- Kay Weniger: ‘Es wird im Leben dir mehr genommen als gegeben …’. Lexikon der aus Deutschland und Österreich emigrierten Filmschaffenden 1933 bis 1945. Eine Gesamtübersicht. ACABUS-Verlag, Hamburg 2011, ISBN 978-3-86282-049-8, S. 161 f.
