= The Other (1913 film) =

1913 film directed by Max Mack

- German: Der Andere
- Directed by: Max Mack
- Written by: Max Mack (screenplay); Hippolyte Taine (play)
- Based on: Der Andere; 1894 play by Paul Lindau
- Produced by: Jules Greenbaum
- Starring: Albert Bassermann; Emmerich Hanus; Nelly Ridon
- Cinematography: Hermann Boettger
- Production company: Vitascope
- Release date: 13 February 1913
- Running time: 48 minutes
- Country: Germany
- Languages: Silent; German intertitles

The Other (German: Der Andere) is a 1913 German silent thriller film directed by Max Mack and starring Albert Bassermann, Emmerich Hanus and Nelly Ridon.

== Plot ==
When talking with friends, Dr. Hallers, a well-known lawyer in Berlin, said he was skeptical about fantasies on the split personality: he could never believe something like that. During a ride, however, he has an accident, after which he often falls into a deep sleep from which he awakens with the feeling of having a dual personality. Later, his double starts to rob his apartment with a thief. During the robbery, the police arrives and arrests the thief. Hallers, having fallen asleep, wakes up without remembering anything of what happened. Eventually, the lawyer recovers and marries his fiancée.

== Cast ==
- Albert Bassermann as Dr. Hallers
- Emmerich Hanus as Judge Arnoldy
- Nelly Ridon as Agnes, Arnoldy's sister
- Hanni Weisse as Amalie, a housemaid
- Léon Resemann as Dickert, a burglar
- Otto Colott as Dr. Feldmann, medical advisor
- Paul Passarge as Kleinchen, Hallers' secretary
- Willy Lengling as Kriminalkommissar Weigert (as C. Lengling)

== Other film versions ==
- The Other (August 1930, Germany, directed by Robert Wiene)
- The Prosecutor Hallers (November 1930, France, directed by Robert Wiene)
- The Haller Case (1933, Italy, directed by Alessandro Blasetti)
