= Leopoldsteinersee =

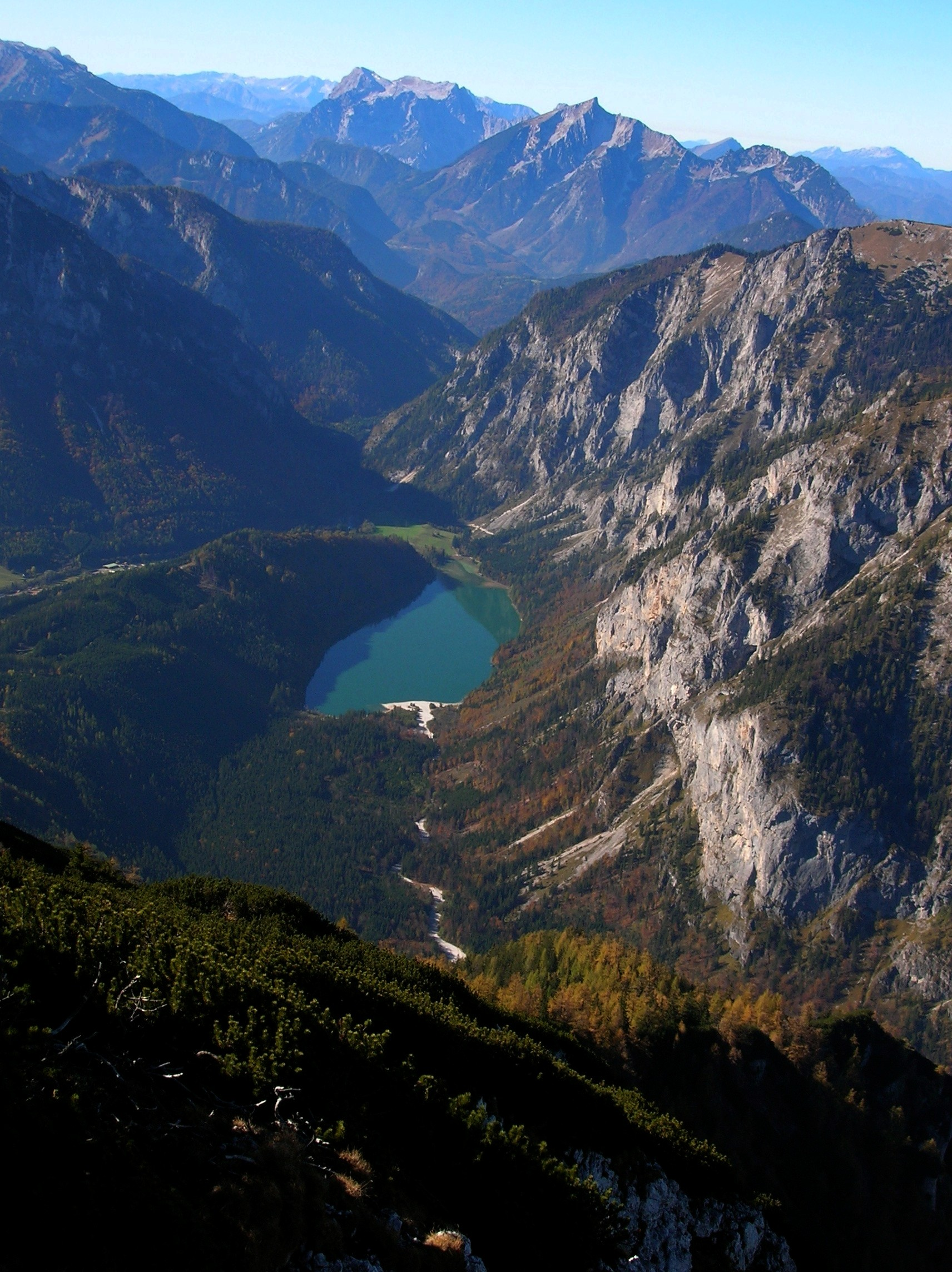
- Looking down from Pfaffenstein towards Leopoldsteiner Lake

- Location within Styria
- Coordinates: 47.572038°N 14.861473°E
- Type: Mountain lake
- Basin countries: Austria
- Max. length: 1,400 metres (4,600 ft)
- Max. width: 370 metres (1,210 ft)
- Max. depth: 31 metres (102 ft)
- Surface elevation: 628 metres (2,060 ft)

Location in Austria

The Leopoldsteinersee is a mountain lake in Styria, in the east of Austria, about 4 kilometres (2.5 mi) northwest of the city of Eisenerz. The lake is named after the nearby Leopoldstein Castle.

== Description ==
The Leopoldsteinersee is situated at 628 metres (2,060 ft) above sea level at the foot of the Seemauer in the western Hochschwab range. The lake is 1,400 metres (4,600 ft) long and 370 metres (1,210 ft) wide. The maximum depth is 31 metres (102 ft). The river Seebach feeds the lake, but it is mainly fed by underground springs. The lake is surrounded by rugged mountains with mixed or coniferous forests. A 3 kilometres (1.9 mi) hiking trail circles the lake. There is a local outfit that rents electric or rowing boats.

== Legend ==
According to local legend, a water sprite or merman was caught near the lake. He bargained for his freedom, showing his captors the iron deposits at Erzberg. Then he disappeared into a water hole.

== Gallery ==
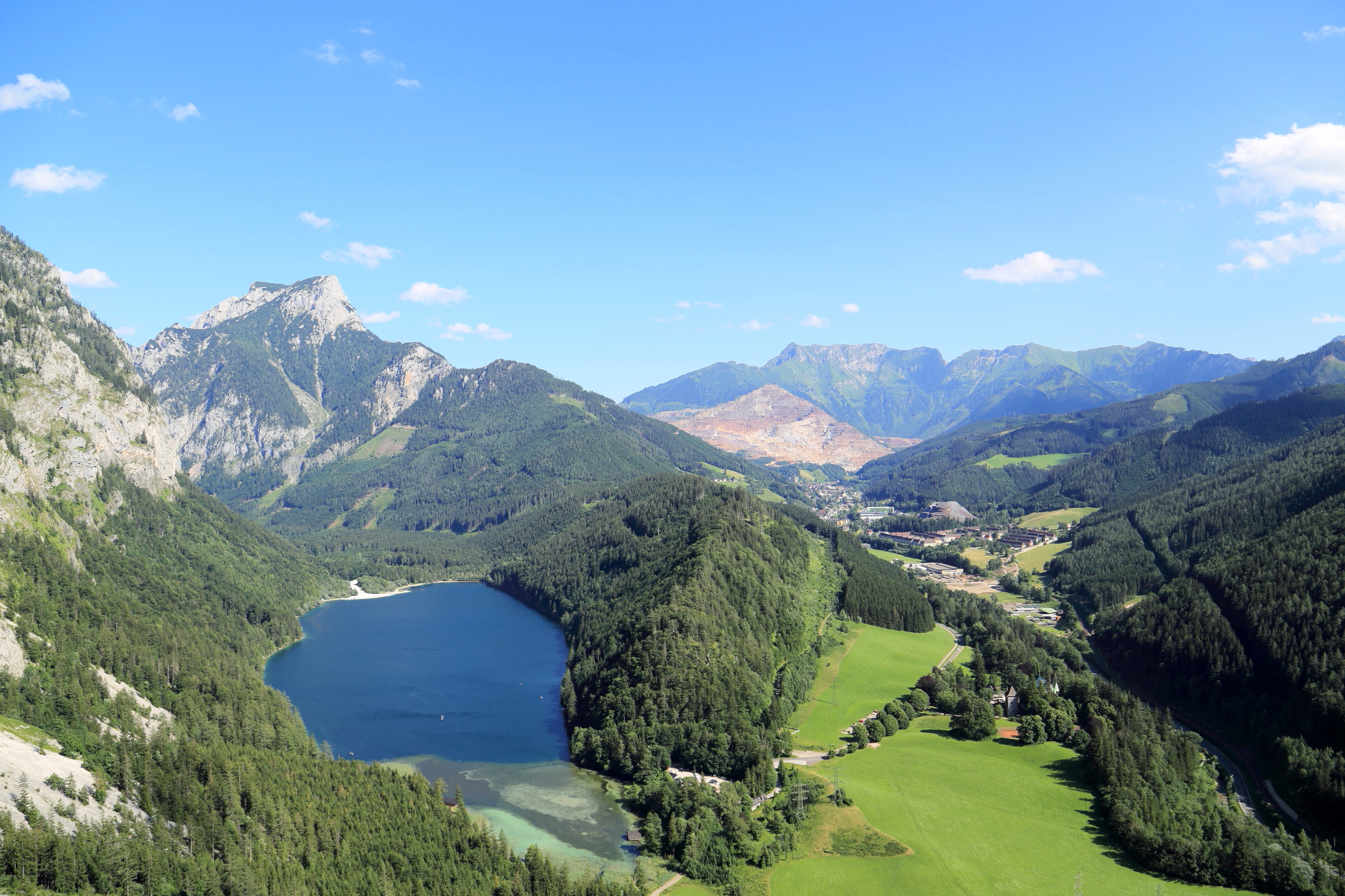
View of Leopoldsteiner See

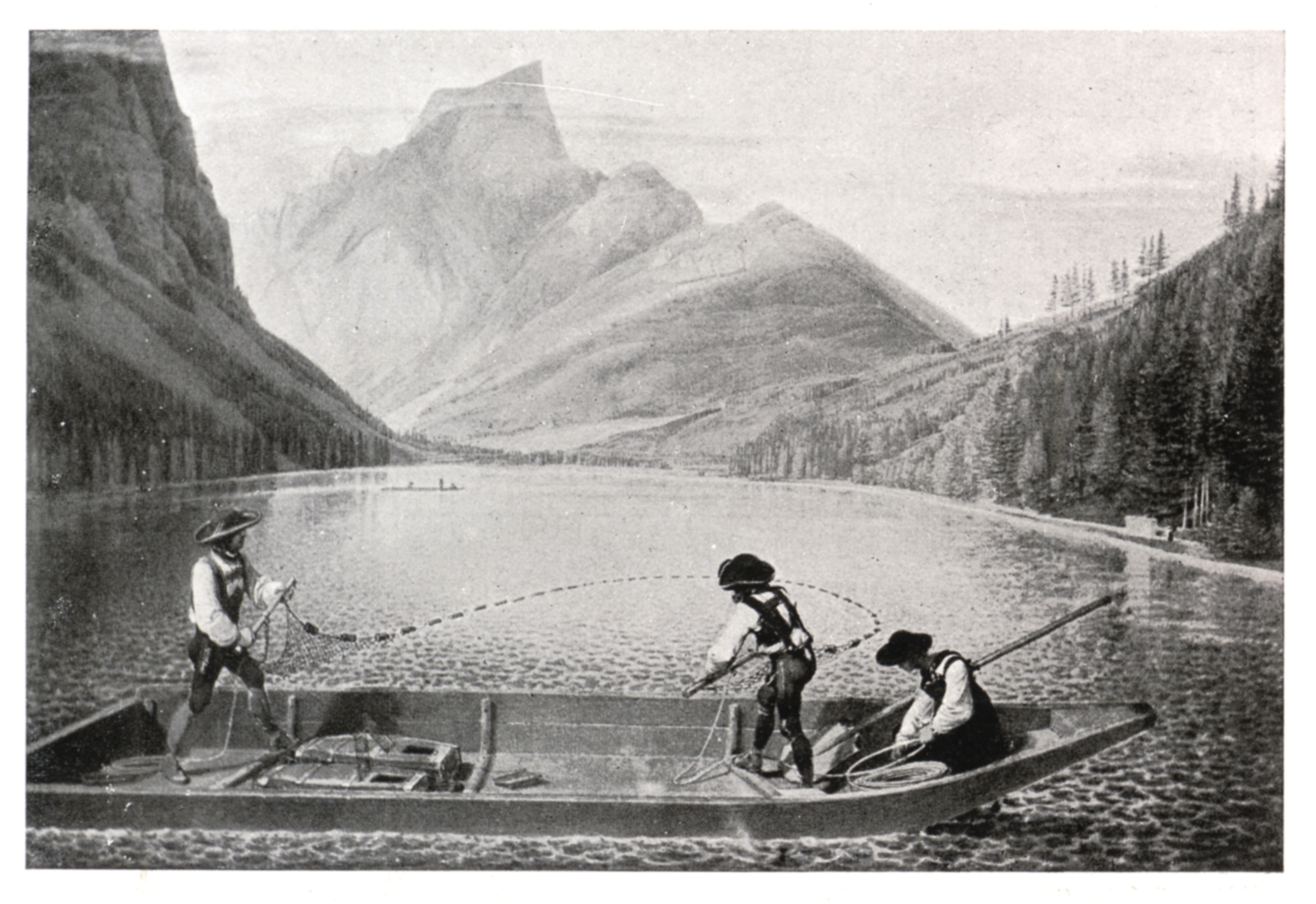
Fishermen on the lake in 1822. Watercolor by Matthäus Loder

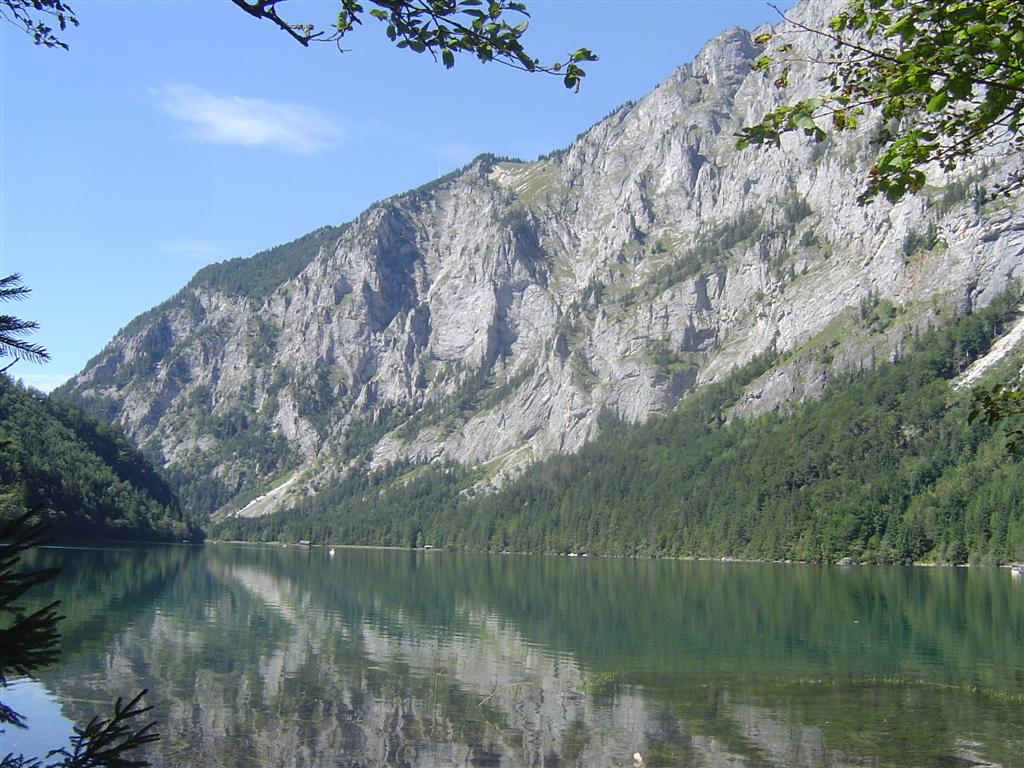
Looking towards the northwest

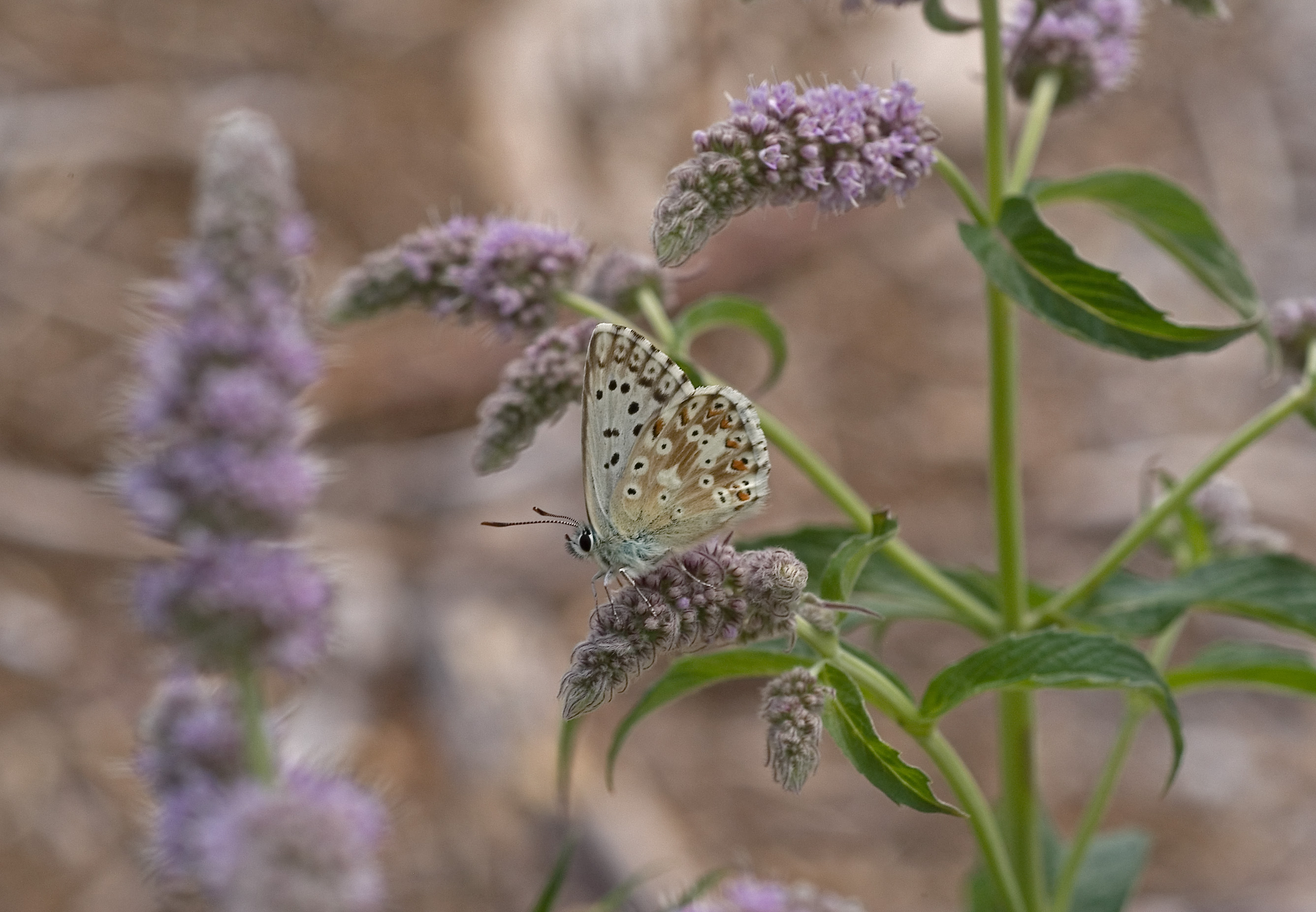
Lysandra coridon photographed near the lake
