= The Revenge of the Pharaohs =

1925 film

- German: Die Rache der Pharaonen
- Directed by: Hans Theyer
- Written by: Paul Frank
- Produced by: Sascha Kolowrat-Krakowsky; Arnold Pressburger
- Starring: Gustav Diessl; Suzy Vernon
- Cinematography: Nicolas Farkas
- Production company: Sascha Film
- Release date: 16 January 1925
- Running time: 92 minutes
- Country: Austria
- Languages: Silent; German intertitles

The Revenge of the Pharaohs (German: Die Rache der Pharaonen) is a 1925 Austrian silent adventure film directed by Hans Theyer and starring Gustav Diessl and Suzy Vernon.

The film's sets were designed by the art director Hans Rouc.

== Cast ==
- Henry Roberts as Lord Spencer
- Maria Palma as Glady - his daughter
- Benno Smytt as Georg Harrison
- Gustav Diessl as Hussein - Kemal
- Suzy Vernon as Leila
