= The Haller Case =

1933 film

- Directed by: Alessandro Blasetti
- Written by: Paul Lindau(play); Leo Menardi
- Starring: Marta Abba; Memo Benassi; Camillo Pilotto; Vittorio Vaser
- Cinematography: Anchise Brizzi
- Edited by: Fernando Tropea; Alessandro Blasetti
- Music by: Cesare A. Bixio; Armando Fragna
- Production company: Società Italiana Cines
- Distributed by: Società Italiana Cines
- Release date: 1933
- Running time: 77 minutes
- Country: Italy
- Language: Italian

The Haller Case (Italian: Il caso Haller) is a 1933 Italian thriller film directed by Alessandro Blasetti and starring Marta Abba, Memo Benassi and Camillo Pilotto. The film is based on the 1893 play Der Andere by Paul Lindau. It marked the screen debut of Isa Miranda, who had her breakthrough role the following year in Everybody's Woman and emerged as the most international-renowned Italian actress of the decade.

It was shot at the Cines Studios in Rome. The film's sets were designed by the art directors Alessandro Blasetti and Alfredo Montori.

== Cast ==
- Marta Abba as La Rossa
- Memo Benassi as Judge Haller
- Camillo Pilotto as Gang's leader
- Vittorio Vaser as Gang member
- Isa Miranda as Badwoman
- Cele Abba
- Ugo Ceseri
- Vasco Creti
- Natalia Murray Danesi
- Egisto Olivieri
- Umberto Sacripante

== Other film versions ==
- The Other (January 1913, Germany, directed by Max Mack)
- The Other (August 1930, Germany, directed by Robert Wiene)
- The Prosecutor Hallers (November 1930, France, directed by Robert Wiene)

== Bibliography ==
- Brizio-Skov, Flavia. Popular Italian Cinema: Culture and Politics in a Postwar Society. I.B.Tauris, 2011.
