= Hans Theyer =

Austrian cinematographer

Hans Theyer (1884–1955) was an Austrian cinematographer. From 1907, Theyer travelled around the world as a newsreel cameraman for Pathé. Theyer’s work took him as far as China, Alaska, the South Sea Islands, Africa and the Middle East. In January 1914, Theyer was employed as a cinematographer for the German Messter film studio. At the outbreak of World War I he was assigned by Messter to the German War Office to produce films on the German war effort. In January 1915, Theyer was sent to the Western Front and to occupied Belgium to record a film together with American film correspondent Albert K. Dawson.

Parts of this footage have been located in the film archives of the Library of Congress by film historians Ron van Dopperen and Cooper C. Graham while researching their book American Cinematographers in the Great War.

In 1916, Theyer returned to Vienna and joined producer Alexander Kolowrat who had set up film propaganda productions for the Austrian war effort.

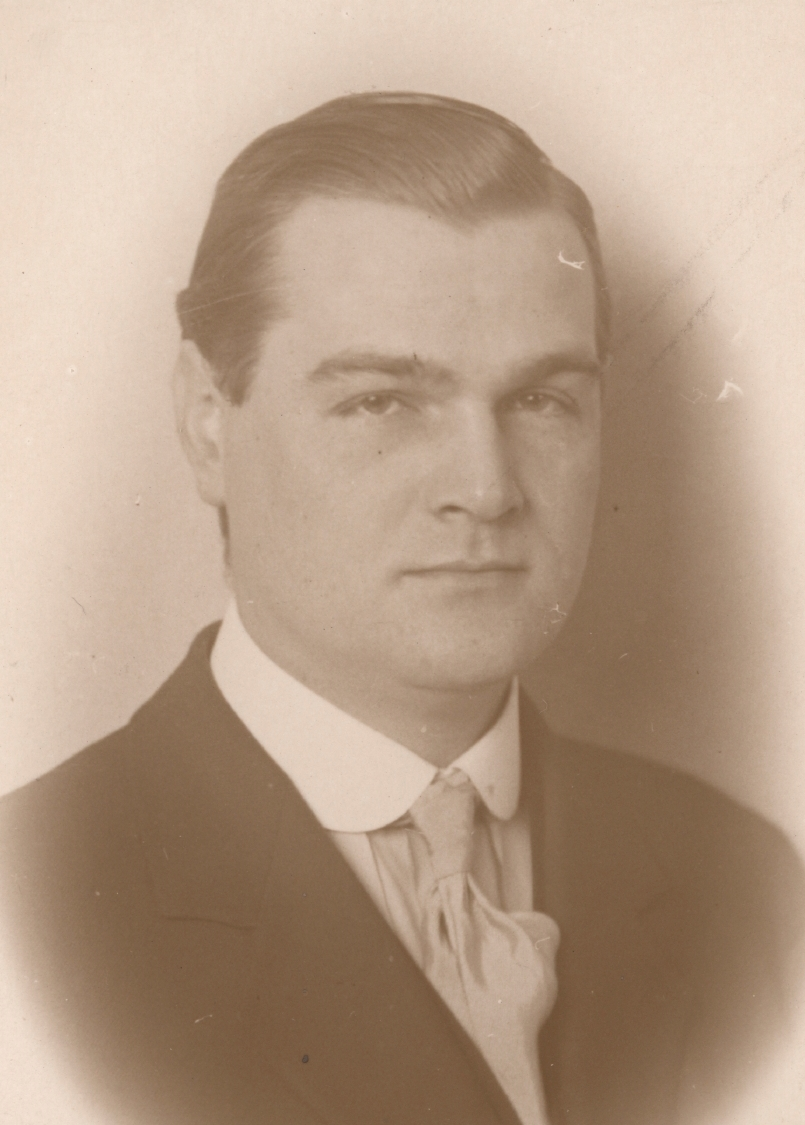
Hans Theyer, January 1915

== Selected filmography ==
- Serge Panine (1922)
- A Vanished World (1922)
- Masters of the Sea (1922)
- Miss Madame (1923)
- Children of the Revolution (1923)
- The Moon of Israel (1924)
- The Revenge of the Pharaohs (1925)
- The Master of Death (1926)
- Der Rosenkavalier (1926)
- The Family without Morals (1927)
- The Criminal of the Century (1928)
- The Woman of Yesterday and Tomorrow (1928)
- Ship of Girls (1929)
- Archduke John (1929)
- Devotion (1929)
- The Midnight Waltz (1929)
- Kult ciała (1930)
- The Deed of Andreas Harmer (1930)
- Adventures on the Lido (1933)
- The Fairy Doll (1936)

== Bibliography ==
- Jung, Uli & Schatzberg, Walter. Beyond Caligari: The Films of Robert Wiene. Berghahn Books, 1999.
