= The Prosecutor Hallers =

1930 film directed by Robert Wiene

- Directed by: Robert Wiene
- Written by: Paul Lindau (play); Johannes Brandt; Jean Guitton; Robert Wiene
- Produced by: Pierre O'Connell; Robert Wiene
- Starring: Jean-Max; Colette Darfeuil; Suzanne Delmas; Florelle
- Cinematography: Nicolas Farkas
- Music by: Artur Guttmann; Will Meisel; Albert Valsien
- Production company: Films Albatros
- Distributed by: Tobis Film
- Release date: September 1930
- Country: France
- Language: French

The Prosecutor Hallers (French: Le procureur Hallers) is a 1930 French drama film directed by Robert Wiene and starring Jean-Max, Colette Darfeuil and Suzanne Delmas. It was the French-language version of the German film The Other based on the play Der Andere by Paul Lindau. The two films were made at the same studio in Berlin, with Wiene beginning work on the French version immediately after finishing the German film.

== Cast ==
- Jean-Max as Le procureur Hallers
- Colette Darfeuil as Marion
- Suzanne Delmas as Emma
- Florelle as Agnès
- Georges Colin as Miniatur
- Henry Krauss as Le psychiatre Köhler
- Charles Barrois as Le commissaire
- Bill Bocket as Fil de Fer

== See also ==
- The Other (1913)
- The Haller Case (1933), an Italian remake

== Bibliography ==
- Jung, Uli & Schatzberg, Walter. Beyond Caligari: The Films of Robert Wiene. Berghahn Books, 1999.
