= The Other (1930 film) =

1930 film

- Directed by: Robert Wiene
- Written by: Johannes Brandt
- Based on: Der Andere; 1894 play by Paul Lindau
- Starring: Fritz Kortner; Käthe von Nagy; Heinrich George; Hermine Sterler
- Cinematography: Nicolas Farkas
- Music by: Artur Guttmann; Will Meisel; Friedrich Hollaender
- Production company: Terra Film
- Distributed by: Terra Film
- Release date: 12 August 1930 (Berlin)
- Running time: 86 minutes
- Country: Germany
- Language: German

The Other (German: Der Andere) is a 1930 German drama film directed by Robert Wiene and starring Fritz Kortner, Käthe von Nagy and Heinrich George. It was based on the 1893 play Der Andere by Paul Lindau but it is very likely that Wiene was influenced by its first screen adaptation, released in 1913. It was shot at the Terra Studios in Berlin. A French-language version titled The Prosecutor Hallers was shot by Wiene immediately afterwards in the same Berlin studio, but with different actors.

== Cast ==
- Fritz Kortner as Prosecutor Hallers
- Käthe von Nagy as Analie Frieben
- Heinrich George as Dickert
- Hermine Sterler as Hallers Schwester
- Ursula van Diemen as Marion
- Eduard von Winterstein as Dr. Koehler
- Oskar Sima as Gruenspecht
- Julius Falkenstein as Sekretaer Bremer
- Paul Bildt as Prof. Wertmann
- Otto Stoessel as Medizinalrat Rienhofer
- Emil Heyse as Polizeikommissar
- Hans Ahrens as Wachtmeister

== Release ==
The film premiered in Berlin at the Capitol on August 12, 1930.

== Reception ==
Ernst Bloch extensively analysed the differences between the 1913 and the 1930 and their social context.

The similarities between the plot and Stevenson's Doctor Jekyll and Mister Hyde have been noted.

The film was also described as one the "first auteur films about the doppelgänger motif".

== See also ==
- The Other (1913)
- The Haller Case (1933), an Italian remake

== Bibliography ==
- Jung, Uli; Schatzberg, Walter (1999). Beyond Caligari: The Films of Robert Wiene. Berghahn Books. ISBN 978-1-57181-156-1.
