= William Ratcliff =

William Ratcliff may refer to:

- William Ratcliff, a play by Heinrich Heine, and its several operatic adaptations
  - William Ratcliff (Cui) (premiered 1869), Russian opera by César Cui
  - Guglielmo Ratcliff (premiered 1895), a later opera by Pietro Mascagni
  - Ratcliff (premiered 1914), an opera by Volkmar Andreae
- William Ratcliff (film), a 1922 Austrian silent film

== See also ==
- William Ratcliffe (1882–1963), British Army soldier and recipient of the Victoria Cross
