= Fatme's Rescue =

1922 film

- Directed by: Heinz Hanus; Hanns Marschall
- Written by: Heinz Hanus; Hanns Marschall
- Cinematography: Eduard Hoesch
- Production company: Chrome-Film
- Release date: 3 November 1922
- Country: Austria
- Languages: Silent; German intertitles

Fatme's Rescue (German: Fatmes Errettung) is a 1922 Austrian silent drama film directed by Heinz Hanus and Hanns Marschall.

== Cast ==
- Paula Tuschinsky
- Albert von Kersten
- Leopoldine Dubois
- Mizzi Griebl

== Bibliography ==
- Von Dassanowsky, Robert (2005). Austrian Cinema: A History. Jefferson, NC: McFarland. ISBN 978-1-4766-2147-0.
