= Rudolf Lindau =

Rudolf Lindau may refer to:

- Rudolf Lindau (diplomat) (1829–1910), German diplomat and writer
- Rudolf Lindau (politician) (1888–1977), German politician and historian
