= Miss Madame =

Miss Madame may refer to:

- Miss Madame (1934 film), a German comedy film
- Miss Madame (1923 film), an Austrian silent film
