= Gypsy Love (1922 film) =

1922 film

- Directed by: Thomas E. Walsh
- Written by: Burton George; Thomas E. Walsh
- Produced by: Arnold Pressburger; Alexander Kolowrat
- Starring: Anny Ondra; Albert von Kersten
- Cinematography: Nicolas Farkas
- Production company: Sascha-Film
- Release date: 22 September 1922
- Country: Austria
- Languages: Silent; German intertitles

Gypsy Love (German: Zigeunerliebe) is a 1922 Austrian silent film directed by Thomas E. Walsh and starring Anny Ondra and Albert von Kersten.

The film's sets were designed by the art director Artur Berger. It was shot at the Sievering Studios in Vienna. Karl Hartl worked as assistant director on the production.

== Cast ==
- Anny Ondra
- Albert von Kersten
- Paul Baratoff as Ben Zwi
- Julius Klinkowström
- Hugo Penyo
- Albertina Rasch
- Harry Schürmann
- Gyula Szöreghy

== Bibliography ==
- Bock, Hans-Michael & Bergfelder, Tim. The Concise CineGraph. Encyclopedia of German Cinema. Berghahn Books, 2009.
