= One Night in Yoshiwara =

1928 film

- Directed by: Emmerich Hanus
- Written by: Hans Brennert
- Starring: Alfred Abel; Barbara Dju; Rudolf Klein-Rogge
- Cinematography: Eugen Hamm
- Music by: Hermann Worch
- Release date: 1928
- Country: Germany
- Languages: Silent; German intertitles

One Night in Yoshiwara (German:Eine Nacht in Yoshiwara) is a 1928 German silent film directed by Emmerich Hanus and starring Alfred Abel, Barbara Dju and Rudolf Klein-Rogge. (director), with Barabara Dju and Alfred Abel (1928)

== Cast ==
- Alfred Abel
- Barbara Dju
- Rudolf Klein-Rogge

== Bibliography ==
- Bock, Hans-Michael & Bergfelder, Tim. The Concise CineGraph. Encyclopedia of German Cinema. Berghahn Books, 2009.
- DeCelles, Naomi. Recollecting Lotte Eisner: Cinema, Exile, and the Archive. University of California Press, 2022.
