= Gerhard Gruber =

Austrian composer and piano player (born 1951)

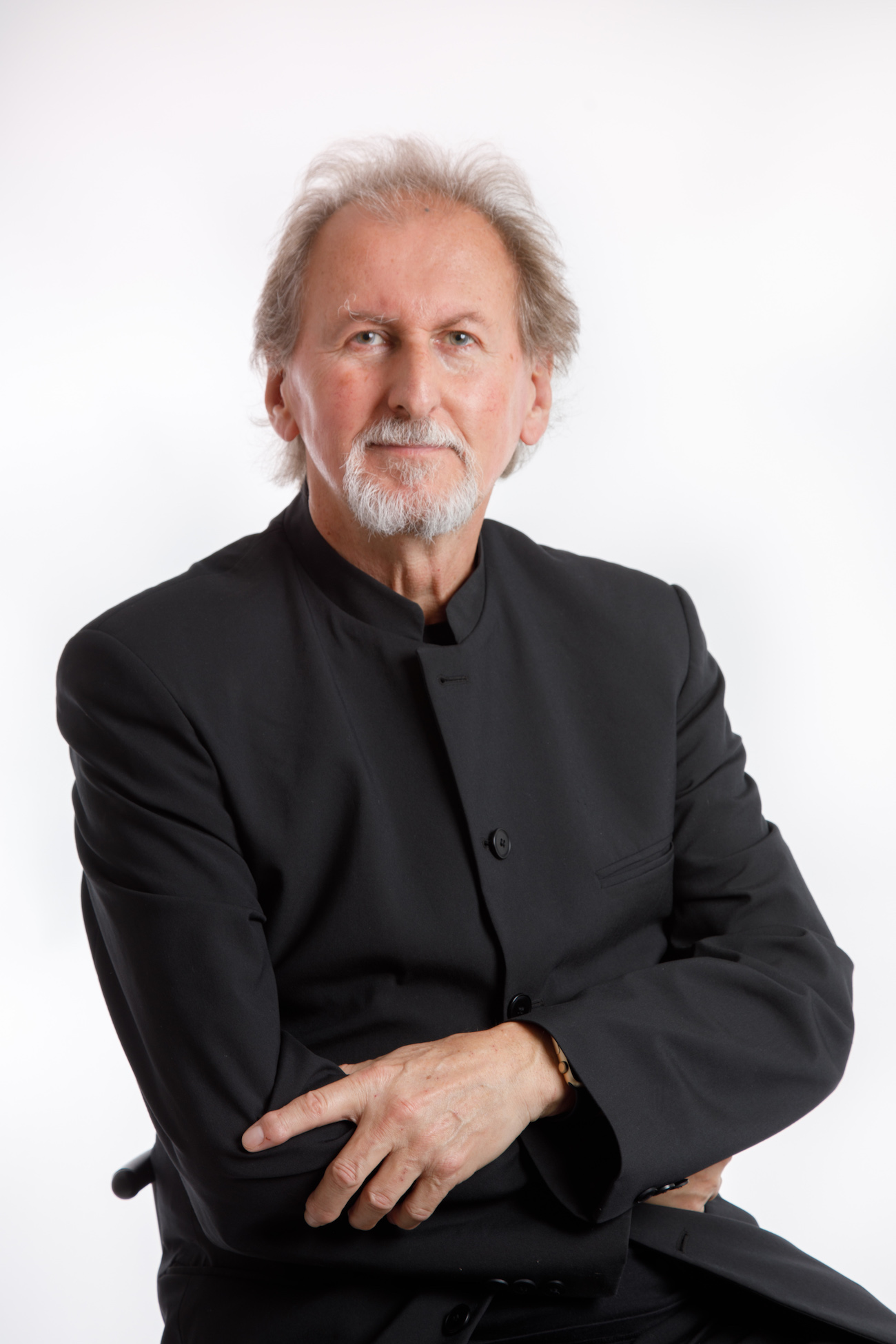
Gerhard Gruber in 2019

Gerhard Gruber (born 6 May 1951 in Aigen im Mühlkreis) is an Austrian composer and piano player. As accompanist for silent films, he has become the leading authority in Austria since 1988.

He has performed for about 600 different films (Istanbul 2018, Paris, Krasnoyarsk /Siberia, Mexico, Kyiv, Odesa 2017, Los Angeles 2012, Mumbai-Pune 2012, Washington-Los Angeles 2011, Delhi-Pune-Goa/India 2011, Tokyo 2006/2007/2008, Hobart/Australia 2007–09, Rotorua/New Zealand 2008/2010, Padova, Motovun Film Festival 2007, Cineconcerts Bordeaux 2005, Filmfestival Pisek/CZ 2008/2011, Filmfestival Uherske Hradiste 2009/2011, Viennale 1999-2004/2012, Munich, Hamburg, Diagonale). He composed the music for Café Elektric.

From 1983 until 2011 Gerhard Gruber was working and performing as a composer and musician for theatre.

He was featured in Ilse Aichinger's Subtexte as "the one who first makes each film possible and, at the same time, unnecessary. Those who have seen his hands move on the illuminated keys might even risk forgetting Chaplin"

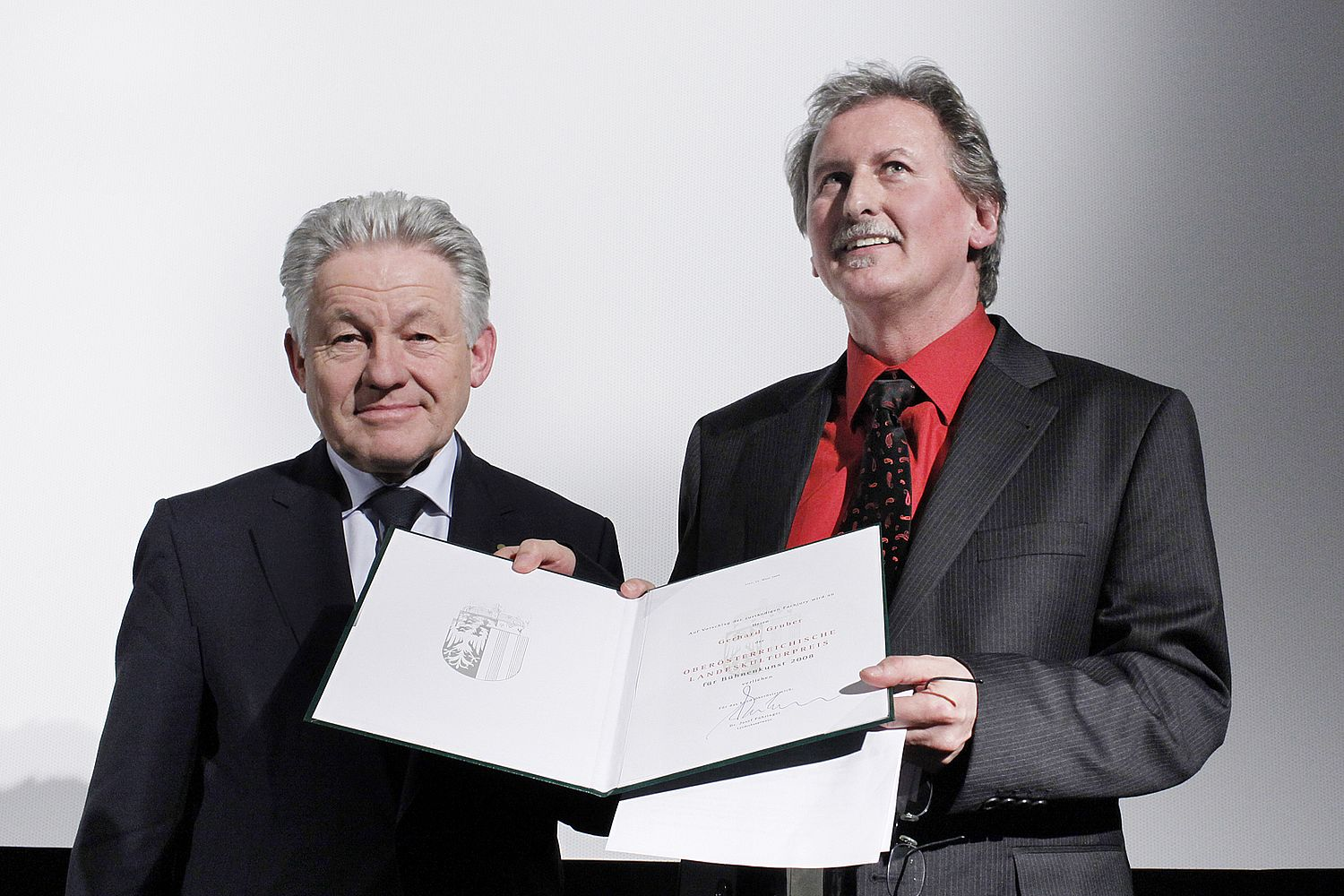
Bühnenkunstpreis des Landes Oberösterreich on 25 March 2009

== Awards ==
Gruber was awarded the Nestroy Theatre Prize in 2006 and the Bühnenkunstpreis des Landes Oberösterreich in 2008.

== Performances for silent movies (out of 600) ==
- Broken Blossoms
- Das Cabinet des Dr. Caligari
- Die freudlose Gasse
- Die Sklavenkönigin
- The White Hell of Pitz Palu
- Café Elektric
- Intolerance
- Metropolis
- Nanook of the North
- Nosferatu, eine Symphonie des Grauens
- Pandora's Box

== Venues ==
- Toronto York University 2019
- Luxembourg 2019
- Beijing International Film Festival 2019
- Bratislava 2019
- Istanbul 2018
- Beijing, Shanghai 2017
- Krasnoyarsk Siberia 2017
- Bratislava 2017
- Paris, Fondation Jérôme Seydoux-Pathé 2017
- Silent Film Festival Hobart 2017
- Ukraine Tour – Kyiv, Odesa, Kharkiv 2016
- Mexico City, Querétaro 2016
- Filmoteca Valencia 2016
- Boston Jewish Film Festival 2016

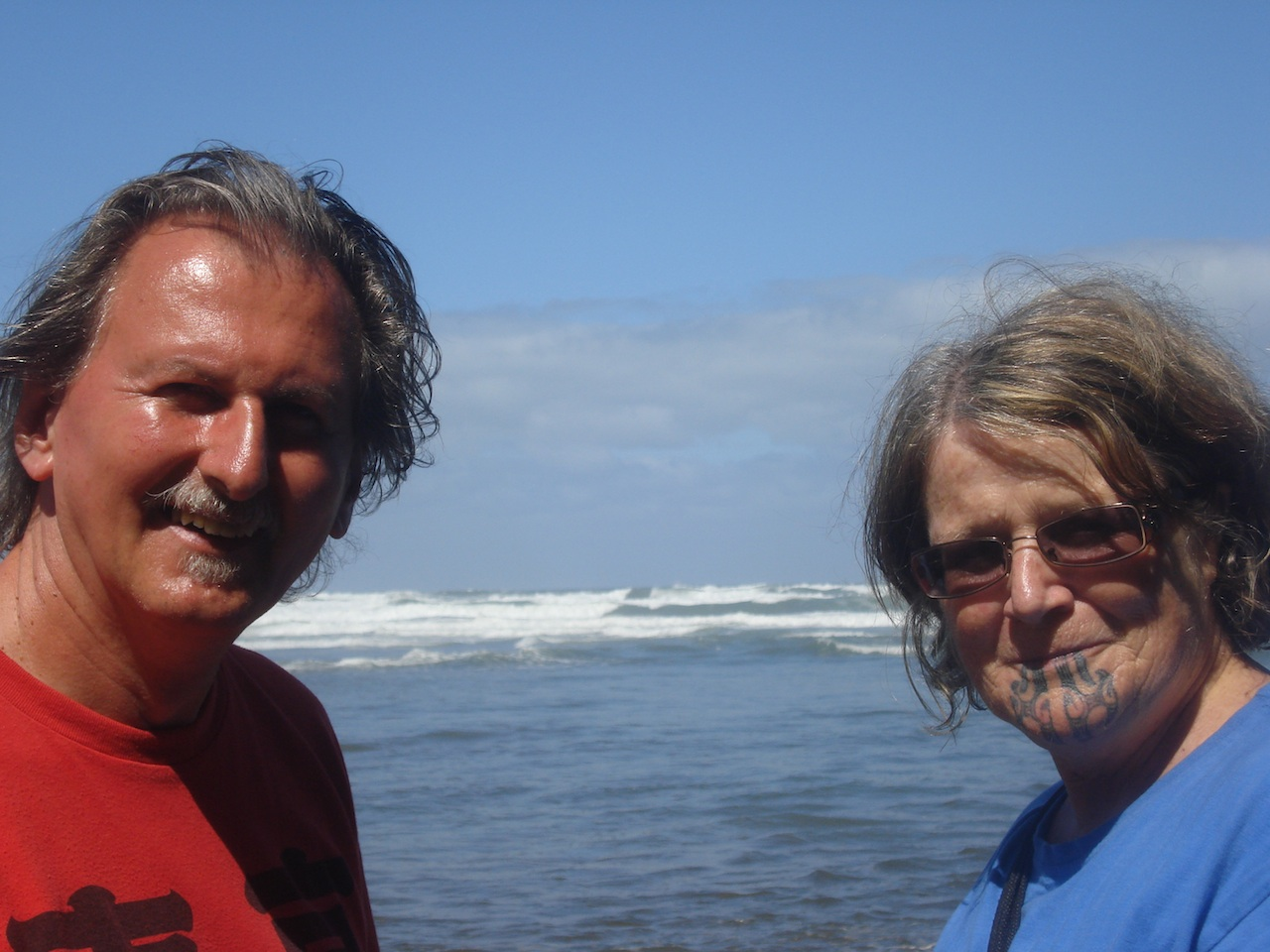
Gerhard Gruber with Moata McNamara, organizer of the Silent Film Festival Rotorua, 2008

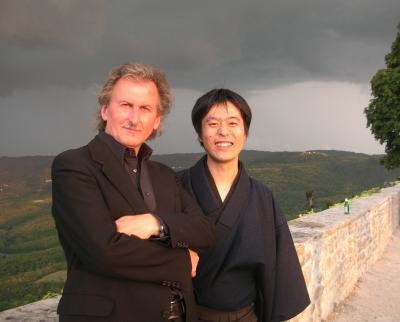
Gerhard Gruber and Ichiro Kataoka, Motovun Film Festival, 2007

- 3rd Students Film Festival of India, Pune 2015
- National Film Center Tokyo 2014
- Auckland University of Technology 2013
- State Cinema Hobart 100th anniversary 2013
- Lenin (nuclear icebreaker) – Film music recordings 2013
- Los Angeles Jewish Film Festival 2012
- Los Angeles American Cinematheque/ Aero Theatre 2012
- Pune-Mumbai/ 2nd India Silent Movie Tour 2012
- Washington-Los Angeles/ USA Silent Movie Tour 2011
- Delhi-Pune-Goa/ India Silent Movie Tour 2011
- Silence! Silent Movie Festival Rotorua, Neuseeland 2008
- Motovun Film Festival 2007
- Jüdisches Filmfestival Wien 2007/2010
- Austria Japan Silent Film Duo Project, Tokyo
- State Cinema Hobart/ Australien 2007/2008/2010
- International Student Film Festival Písek 2008/2011
- Filmfestival Uherske Hradiste/CZ 2009/2011
- Silent Movie at Amici della musica di Padova 2008
- Cinéconcerts Bordeaux 2005
- Breitenseer Lichtspiele Wien
- Viennale
- Metrokino / Filmarchiv Austria
- Österreichisches Filmmuseum
- Munich Film Archive
- Diagonale
- Prater Filmfestival 2005/2006

== Theatre works (selection) ==
- Das Nibelungenlied – Justus Neumann – 2010
- Die 39 Stufen – Schauspielhaus Salzburg – 2010/2011
- Hennir – Isabel Karajan – 2009
- Bettleroper – Projekttheater Vorarlberg – 2009
- How much, Schatzi? – Projekttheater Vorarlberg – 2006
- Automatenbüfett – Theater in der Josefstadt Wien – 2004
- Der Alpenkönig und der Menschenfeind – Theater in der Josefstadt Wien – 2004
- Mann, Frau, Kind – Theater in der Josefstadt Wien – 2003
- Das Dschungelbuch – Theater der Jugend Wien – 2002
- Der Zerrissene – Volkstheater Wien – 1997
- Die letzten Tage der Menschheit – Donaufestival Krems – 1994
- Mir soll ins Herz gestochen werden – Theater Narrnkastl Wien – 1985
- Mozarella – Zwischen den Zeilen Theater Zürich – 1983

== See also ==
- List of Austrians in music
