= The Battle (1934 film) =

1934 French-British film by Nicolas Farkas

- Directed by: Nicolas Farkas
- Written by: Claude Farrère (novel); Robert Stevenson; Bernard Zimmer; Nicolas Farkas
- Starring: Charles Boyer; Merle Oberon; John Loder; Betty Stockfeld
- Cinematography: Roger Hubert
- Edited by: Roger Mercanton; William Barache
- Music by: André Gailhard
- Production companies: Gaumont British Picture Corporation; Lianofilm
- Distributed by: Gaumont British Distributors
- Release date: April 1934
- Running time: 83 minutes
- Country: United Kingdom
- Language: English

The Battle (also known as Thunder in the East) is a 1934 Franco–British co-production English language drama film directed by Nicolas Farkas, and starring Charles Boyer, Merle Oberon and John Loder. It was adapted from a 1909 French novel by Claude Farrère entitled La bataille.

== Plot ==
In 1904 during the Russo-Japanese War, a Japanese naval officer gets his wife, played by Merle Oberon, to seduce a British attaché in order to gain secrets from him. Things begin to go wrong when she instead falls in love with him.

== Cast ==
- Charles Boyer as Marquis Yorisaka
- Merle Oberon as Marquise Yorisaka
- John Loder as Fergan
- Betty Stockfeld as Betty Hockley
- Valéry Inkijinoff as Hirata
- Miles Mander as Feize
- Henri Fabert as The Admiral

== Production ==
This was first released as a French-language film entitled La bataille with many of the same cast members, but with Oberon's part played by the French actress Annabella.

In the United States, the English film was released in August 1935 under the title Thunder in the East.

The English version was revived in 1943 under a new title, Hara-Kiri, and changes were made that transformed the film into an anti-Japanese wartime propaganda film. The primary changes were a foreword relating to Pearl Harbor and Japanese perfidy, as well as an epilogue about the cowardice of hara-kiri.

== See also ==
- The Battle (1923)

== Bibliography ==
- Cook, Pam. Gainsborough Pictures. Cassell, 1997.
