= Children of the Revolution (1923 film) =

1923 film

- Directed by: Hans Theyer
- Produced by: Arnold Pressburger; Alexander Kolowrat
- Starring: Carl Heinz Fischer; Oscar Beregi; Albert von Kersten
- Cinematography: Nicolas Farkas
- Production company: Sascha-Film
- Release date: 2 February 1923
- Country: Austria
- Languages: Silent; German intertitles

Children of the Revolution (German: Kinder der Revolution) is a 1923 German silent film directed by Hans Theyer and starring Carl Heinz Fischer, Oscar Beregi and Albert von Kersten.

The film's sets were designed by the art director Hans Rouc. It was shot at the Sievering Studios in Vienna.

== Cast ==
- Carl Heinz Fischer
- Oscar Beregi
- Albert von Kersten
- Artur Ranzenhofer
- Annemarie Schartmüller
- Grete Wegscheid
- Renati Renee
- Franz Herterich

== Bibliography ==
- Paolo Caneppele & Günter Krenn. Elektrische Schatten. Filmarchiv Austria, 1999.
