= Moon of Israel (novel) =

1918 novel by H. Rider Haggard

- First edition (UK)
- Author: H. Rider Haggard
- Language: English
- Publisher: John Murray (UK); Longmans, Green (US)
- Publication date: 1918
- Publication place: United Kingdom

Moon of Israel is a novel by English writer H. Rider Haggard, first published in 1918 by John Murray. Moon of Israel is a historical novel with fantasy elements. The novel narrates the events of the Biblical Exodus from Egypt told from the perspective of a scribe named Ana. Moon of Israel is set during the reign of the Pharaoh Amenmeses, identified in the novel as the Pharaoh of the Exodus.

Haggard dedicated his novel to Sir Gaston Maspero, a distinguished Egyptologist and director of Cairo Museum.

== Reception ==
Fantasy historian Jessica Amanda Salmonson described Moon of Israel as a "beautifully written Jewish legend".

== Adaptation ==
His novel was the basis of a script by Ladislaus Vajda, for film-director Michael Curtiz in his 1924 Austrian epic known as Die Sklavenkönigin, or "Queen of the Slaves".
