= Albert von Kersten =

Austrian actor (1889–1937)

- Born: 31 December 1889; Fiume, Austro-Hungarian Empire
- Died: 18 December 1937 (aged 47); Berlin, Germany
- Other name: Albert Kersten
- Occupation: Actor
- Years active: 1921-1935 (film)

Albert von Kersten (1889–1937) was an Austrian stage and film actor.

== Selected filmography ==
- Serge Panine (1922)
- Fatme's Rescue (1922)
- Gypsy Love (1922)
- William Ratcliff (1922)
- The Hell of Barballo (1923)
- Miss Madame (1923)
- Children of the Revolution (1923)
- Colonel Redl (1925)
- The Arsonists of Europe (1926)
- Two and a Lady (1926)
- Café Elektric (1927)
- Tales from the Vienna Woods (1928)
- The Fate of the House of Habsburg (1928)
- Endangered Girls (1928)
- The Missing Wife (1929)
- Madame Bluebeard (1931)
- Grandstand for General Staff (1932)
- When Love Sets the Fashion (1932)
- Cavaliers of the Kurfürstendamm (1932)
- Quick (1932)
- Song of the Black Mountains (1933)
- I Was Jack Mortimer (1935)
- Artist Love (1935)
- My Life for Maria Isabella (1935)

== Bibliography ==
- Giesen, Rolf. Nazi Propaganda Films: A History and Filmography. McFarland, 2003.
