= Alexander Kolowrat =

Austrian film producer (1886–1927)

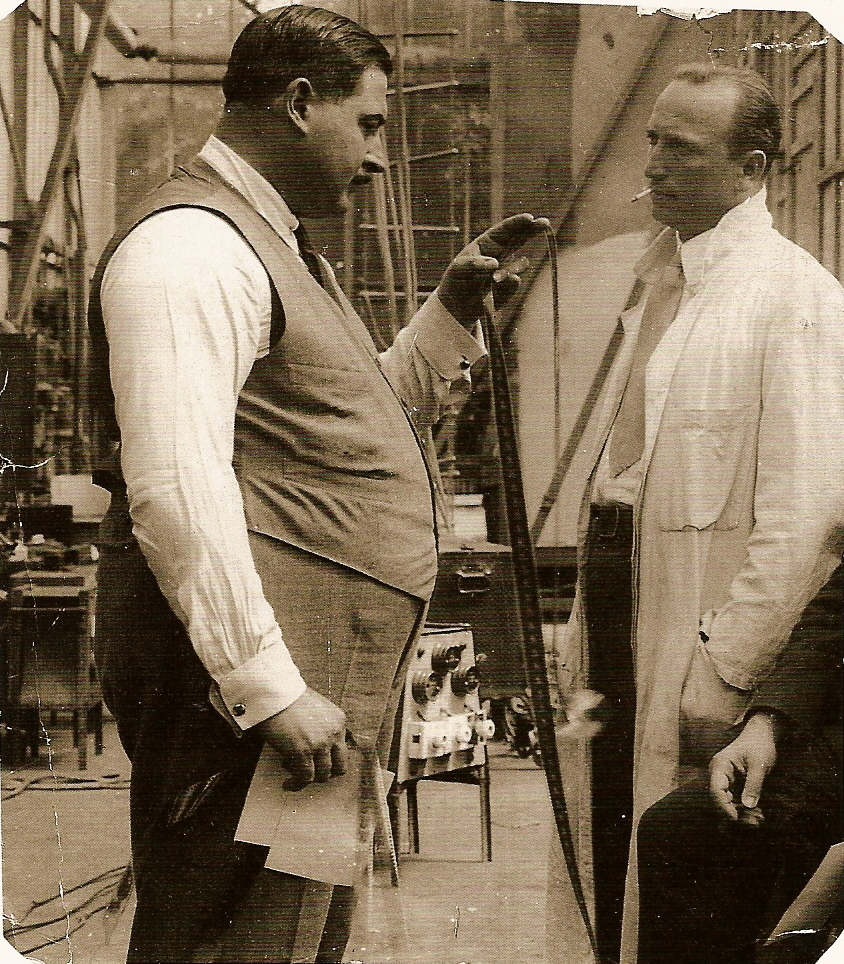
- Sascha Kolowrat (left) at work, around 1916
- Born: Alexander Joseph Graf Kolowrat-Krakowsky; 29 January 1886; Bloomfield, New Jersey, United States
- Died: 4 December 1927 (aged 41); Vienna, Austria
- Occupation: Film producer
- Years active: 1909–1927

Count Alexander "Sascha" Joseph von Kolowrat-Krakowsky (29 January 1886 – 4 December 1927) was an Austrian film producer of Bohemian-Czech descent from the House of Kolowrat. A pioneer of Austrian cinema, he founded the first major film studio Sascha-Film in Vienna.

== Life ==
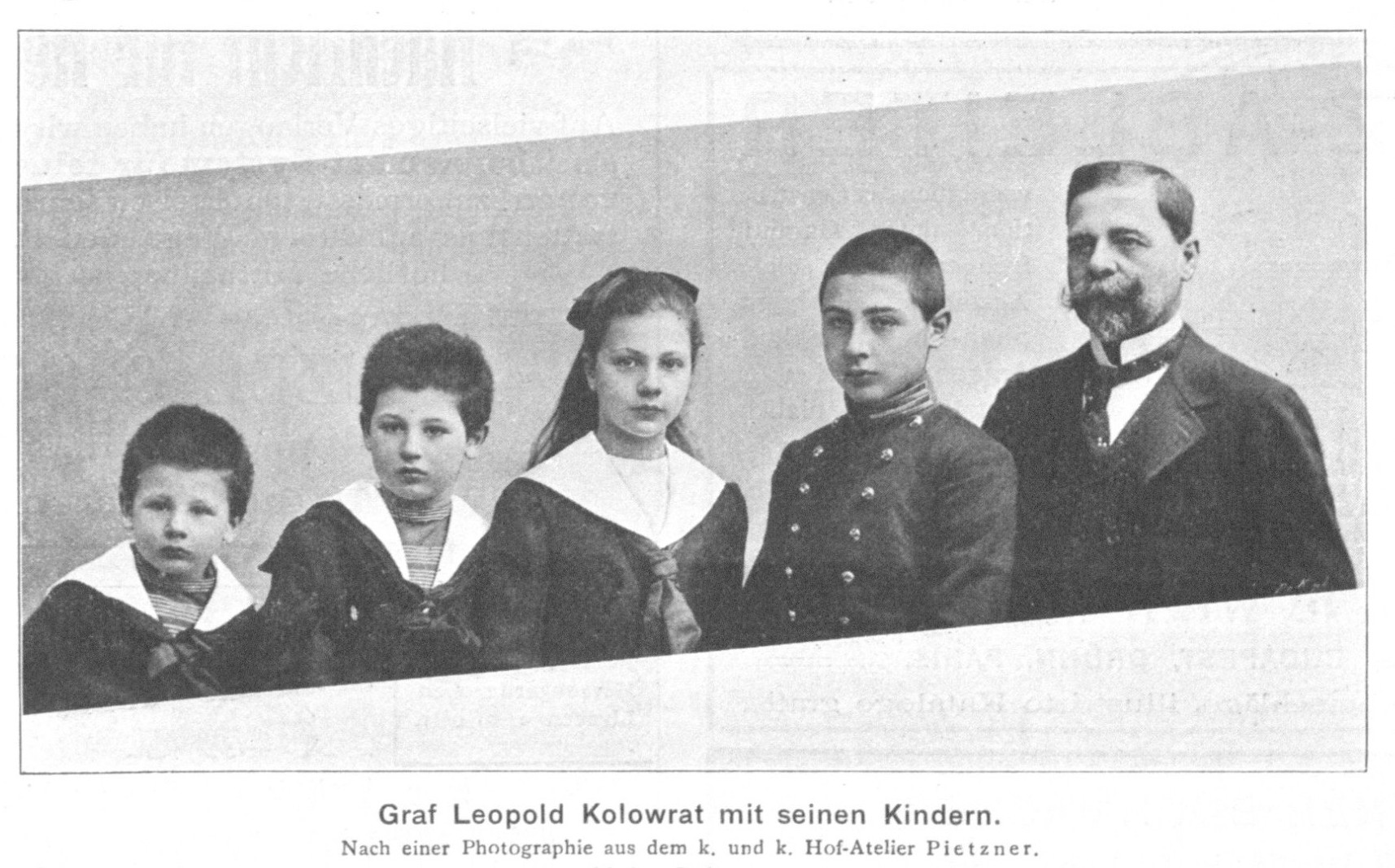
Count Leopold Kolowrat and his children, 1903

He was born in what is now Glen Ridge, New Jersey, which was then part of the now-neighboring town of Bloomfield. He was the son of Count Leopold Filip Kolowrat-Krakowsky (1852–1910) and his wife Nadine Freiin von Huppmann-Valbella (1858–1942), the daughter of a successful cigarette manufacturer from Saint Petersburg. He had three siblings: Bertha, Friedrich and Heinrich.

The reason "Sascha" Kolowrat-Krakowsky was born in the US is described in a letter of March 30, 1984, from his nephew Count Colloredo-Mansfeld to the Austrian film scholar Walter Fritz:

Due to a supposed or actual 'defamation' of his bride, my grandfather [Leopold] shot his adversary, a Prince of Auersperg, in a duel, which had to be atoned for by an exile of several years, according to the customs of that time. This Old Austrian, very Schnitzler-like drama could have provided his son [Sascha] with a good film subject.

After Count Leopold Kolowrat had been granted a reprieve by Emperor Franz Joseph I of Austria, the family returned to Austria-Hungary. Sascha Kolowrat studied at the Catholic University of Leuven (present-day Katholieke Universiteit Leuven) in Belgium where he became a member of the German Catholic fraternity Katholische Academische Verbindung Lovania Leuven. He served in the army and was able to speak many European languages. After he had met Charles Pathé in Paris in 1909, he got into cinematography, besides his interests in motorcycle and car racing, aviation and ballooning. In 1909, he privately filmed a car racing at the Semmering Pass.

After the death of his father in 1910 and the inheritance of his estates in Bohemia, Alexander Kolowrat founded the Sascha-Film factory and a film laboratory at his castle Groß Meierhöfen (today Velké Dvorce) in Pfraumberg (Přimda). In 1912, he moved to Vienna and founded the Sascha-Filmfabrik on Pappenheimgasse 2/Treustraße in Brigittenau. One of his first productions with Sascha-Film was the documentary Die Gewinnung des Erzes am steirischen Erzberg in Eisenerz ("The Ore Mining in the Styrian Erzberg in Eisenerz"). In 1915, he took over the film branch of the k.u.k. Kriegspressequartier (War Media Quarters) in Vienna and also produced several propaganda movies during World War I.

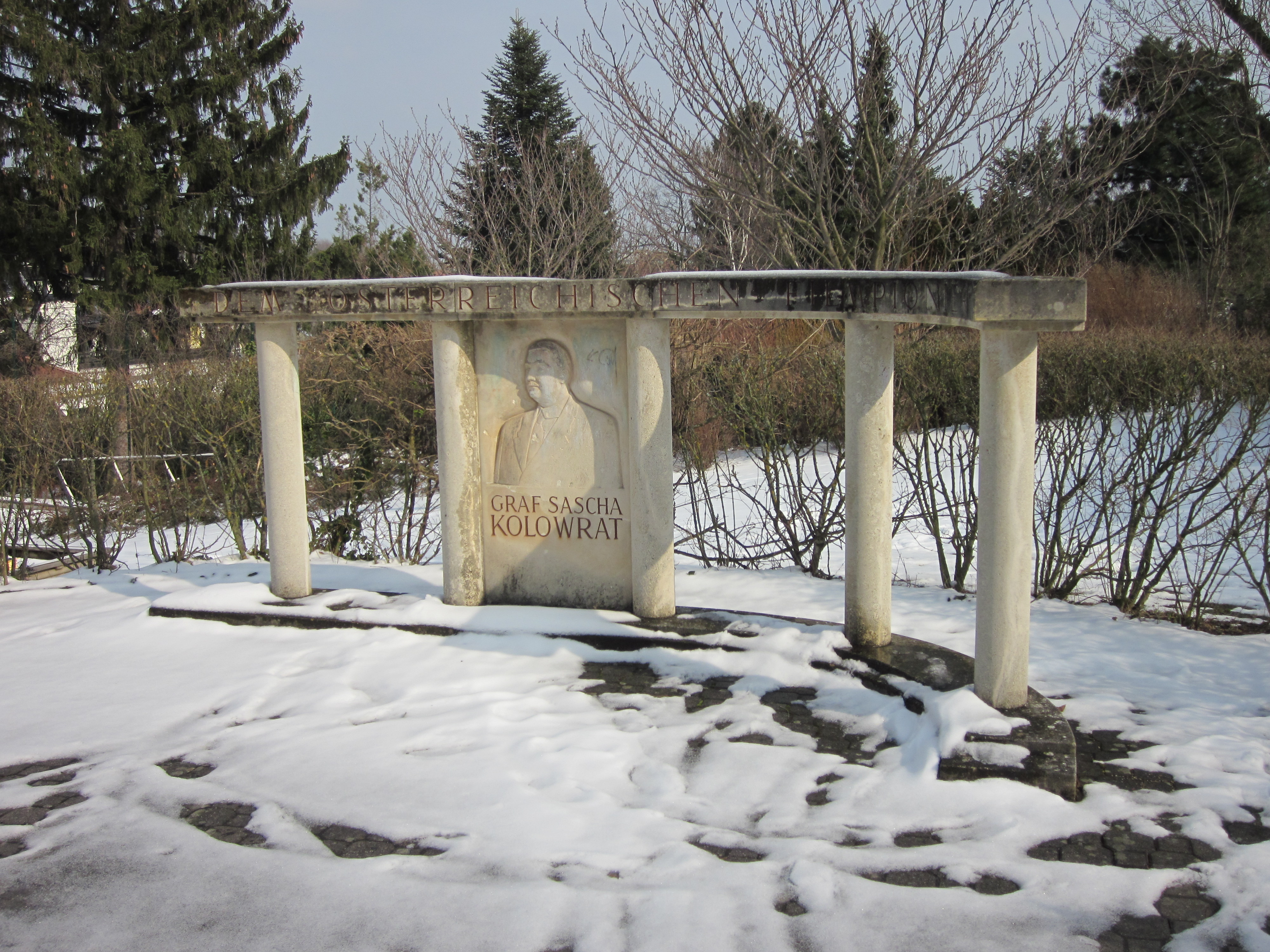
Historic photo of the Kolowrat memorial on the area of the former Wien-Film studio, in Vienna-Sievering, which was removed in 2021

Kolowrat-Krakowsky worked with many actors, e.g. the then-obscure Marlene Dietrich and Willi Forst, who both performed in the 1927 silent film Café Elektric directed by Gustav Ucicky. He did important pioneering work in all film genres of the time. The high points of his artistic work were the productions of monumental silent movies like Sodom and Gomorrah (1922) or Die Sklavenkönigin (1924), both directed by Michael Curtiz, on the Laaer Berg in Vienna-Favoriten. In 1916, he erected Austria's first huge studio in Vienna-Sievering. Together with his Sascha-Film company, he was the owner of several cinemas. He personally loved to attend the Münstedt Cinema in the Prater park, as well as the Burgkino and the Opernkino. In the Vienna Prater, west of the Rotunde, he erected "Old London" in 1920 for film shots, similar to the "Venice in Vienna" theme park nearby, but smaller.

The count owned a large city palace on Wenceslas Square in Prague. An enthusiastic mobilist he financed the development of a lightweight sports car ("Sascha-Wagen") designed by the Austro-Daimler engineer Ferdinand Porsche, which ran at the 1922 Targa Florio with Alfred Neubauer at the wheel.

Kolowrat died of cancer on 4 December, 1927. He would be referenced in the hit Dietrich-von Sternberg film collaboration Dishonored (1931), in which Marlene Dietrich plays a spy whose civilian name is Marie Kolowrat.

== Filmography ==
- Die Gewinnung des Eisens am steirischen Erzberg in Eisenerz (1912)
- Der Millionenonkel (directed by Hubert Marischka, 1913)
- Wien im Krieg (propaganda film, 1916)
- Martyr of His Heart (1918)
- The Other I (1918)
- Eine versunkene Welt (1920)
- Gypsy Love (1922)
- Sodom und Gomorrha (directed by Michael Curtiz, 1922)
- Young Medardus (directed by Michael Curtiz, 1923)
- Children of the Revolution (1923)
- Miss Madame (1923)
- Die Sklavenkönigin (directed by Michael Curtiz, 1924)
- Das Spielzeug von Paris (directed by Michael Curtiz, 1925)
- Salammbô (co-production with Gaumont, 1925)
- Café Elektric (directed by Gustav Ucicky, 1927)

== Literature ==
- Fritz, W., & Zahradnik, M. (eds.), 1992: Erinnerungen an S. Kolowrat (Schriftenreihe des Österreichischen Filmarchivs 31) (in German)
- Hübl, I. M. & S. K., 1950: Ein Beitrag zur Geschichte der österreichischen Kinematographie (in German)
