= Der Andere =

Play by Paul Lindau

Der Andere is a play by Paul Lindau, which was filmed several times, including in 1913 as The Other by Max Mack, in 1930 as The Other and The Prosecutor Hallers by Robert Wiene and in 1933 as The Haller Case by Alessandro Blasetti.

== Plot ==
Staatsanwalt Hallers, a highly feared prosecuting attorney, leads a double life, moonlighting as a criminal. Analie Frieben finds out about his secret, but because of her unsavoury past she is in no position to betray it. Hallers' own ego eventually proves his downfall.
