= Emmerich Hanus =

Austrian actor and film director

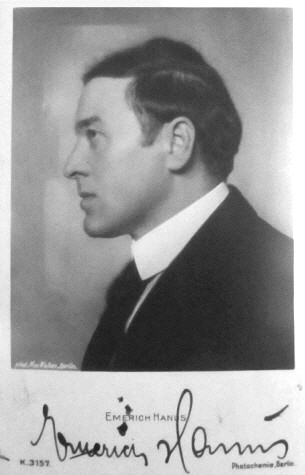
- Born: 24 August 1884; Vienna, Austria-Hungary
- Died: 20 November 1956 (aged 72); Vienna, Austria
- Occupations: Actor, film director
- Years active: 1906-1949
- Relatives: Heinz Hanus (brother)

Emmerich Hanus (24 August 1884 – 20 November 1956) was an Austrian actor and film director. He appeared in 22 films between 1913 and 1949. His older brother was actor and film director Heinz Hanus.

== Selected filmography ==
- The Other (1913)
- The Final Mask (1924)
- A Free People (1925)
- The Eleven Schill Officers (1926)
- That Was Heidelberg on Summer Nights (1927)
- One Night in Yoshiwara (director), with Barabara Dju and Alfred Abel (1928)
- The Hour of Temptation (1936)
- It's Only Love (1947)
- The Freckle (1948)
