= That Was Heidelberg on Summer Nights =

1927 film

- Directed by: Emmerich Hanus
- Written by: Siegfried Philippi
- Starring: Fritz Alberti; Charlotte Susa; Olga Engl
- Cinematography: Josef Dietze
- Production companies: Althoff & Company
- Release date: 8 February 1927
- Country: Germany
- Languages: Silent; German intertitles

That Was Heidelberg on Summer Nights (German:Das war in Heidelberg in blauer Sommernacht) is a 1927 German romance film directed by Emmerich Hanus and starring Fritz Alberti, Charlotte Susa and Olga Engl. The film was shot on location in Heidelberg.

== Cast ==
In alphabetical order

- Fritz Alberti as Sanitätsrat Liningen
- Fritz Beckmann as Revuedirektor
- Olga Engl as Frau v. Helling
- Karl Etlinger as Schmierenschauspieler Ehrenfleck
- Julius Falkenstein as Stransky
- Tonio Gennaro as Erste Chargierte
- Antonie Jaeckel as Frau von Gutsbesitzer Wagner
- Margarete Kupfer as Studentenwirtin
- Max Maximilian as Korpsdiener
- Frida Richard as Großmutter Liningen
- Ernst Rückert as Rudolf
- Fritz Schroeter as Geldverleiher
- Charlotte Susa as Grete
- Hertha von Walther as Hertha
- Eduard von Winterstein as Gutsbesitzer Wagner

== Bibliography ==
- Grange, William. Cultural Chronicle of the Weimar Republic. Scarecrow Press, 2008.
