= The Moon of Israel =

1924 film

The Moon of Israel Die Sklavenkönigin
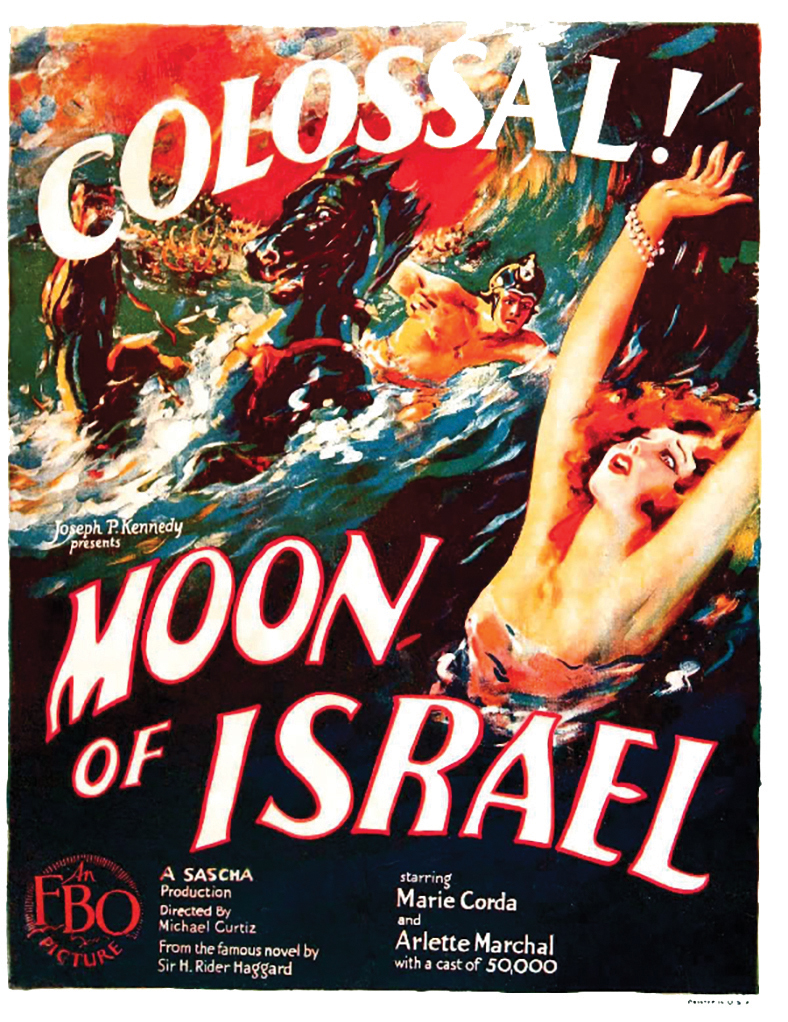
- American film poster
- Directed by: Michael Curtiz (as Mihaly Kertész)
- Written by: Ladislaus Vajda
- Based on: Moon of Israel by H. Rider Haggard
- Produced by: Sascha Kolowrat-Krakowsky; Arnold Pressburger
- Starring: María Corda
- Cinematography: Gustav Ucicky; Max Nekut; Hans Theyer
- Music by: Gerhard Gruber (in the modern reissue)
- Release date: 24 October 1924
- Running time: 103 minutes
- Country: Austria
- Language: Silent (German intertitles)

The Moon of Israel (German: Die Sklavenkönigin, or "The Queen of the Slaves") is a 1924 Austrian epic film. It was directed by Mihaly Kertész (later Michael Curtiz). The script was written by Ladislaus Vajda, based on H. Rider Haggard's 1918 novel Moon of Israel, which in its turn was inspired by the Biblical story of the Exodus.

It was this film that brought Kertész to the attention of the studio head Jack L. Warner, who invited him to Hollywood in 1926, where he rapidly became Michael Curtiz and made a career with the Warner Studios.

Shooting took place in Vienna with about 5,000 extras, in the studios of Sascha-Film, and outdoors in the Laaer Berg park area. The premiere was on 24 October 1924. The restored complete version of the film, which was thought to be entirely lost for many years, was first shown on 26 February 2005 in the Wiener Metro Kino.

== Story ==
In about the year 1230 BC, the Israelites are in slavery in Egypt. At this difficult time, the Jewish slave-girl Merapi falls in love with Prince Seti, son of the Pharaoh Menapta. This socially inappropriate love leads to numerous problems, which can nevertheless be resolved. At the end of the film, Moses leads his people through the Red Sea and into freedom.

== Production ==
One of the most outstanding scenes is the parting of the Red Sea by Moses (Hans Marr). Since at the same time the American film The Ten Commandments was being made, which also featured the parting of the Red Sea, the Viennese team took extraordinary care over this scene out of fear of superior American special effects technology. In the final version, thanks to subsequent trick editing, the gigantic wooden construction, designed to release 100 cubic metres (3,500 cu ft) of water from both sides at once, is unrecognisable. The water poured into a closed wooden trough 8 metres (26 ft) square and 1 metre (3 ft 3 in) deep on the Laaer Berg park in Vienna. The walls of water to either side were modelled out of plaster, which looked completely realistic on black-and-white film. One single take could now depict both the parting and the closing of the sea: for the former, the shot was simply spliced into the film in reverse.

The actors were filmed in the dry and overwhelmed by the "sea" later, during the editing. When, a few weeks after the Sklavenkönigin opened, the competing film was also in the cinemas, it came as a surprise that the parting of the Red Sea was considerably more realistic in the Austrian production. It was not only the Viennese critics who noted this: even Hollywood colleagues expressed their amazement that in this regard Laaer Berg had outdone Hollywood.

The director of Sascha-Film, Arnold Pressburger, assisted the film director Michael Kertész as artistic director. The assistant director was Arthur Gottlein. The cameramen Max Nekut, Gustav Ucicky and Hans Theyer were supported by Sascha Kolowrat-Krakowsky, the film's producer, as technical director.

The film is supposed to have cost 1.5 billion Kronen. The true value of the sum is admittedly relativised by the constant high inflation that raged until the mid-1920s. Still, nevertheless it is one of the highest outlays ever for an Austrian film. Sascha-Film was only able to obtain credit from their bank against the personal security provided by Sascha Kolowrat-Krakowsky. The reason for this was partly the high production costs, but also the film's very risky economic prospects - many Austrian film production companies, after several boom years, had gone bankrupt. Austrian production companies were less and less able to stand up to the strong competition of cheap foreign imports, particularly from the United States. Additionally, inflation was receding, which made Austrian films more expensive abroad, after a period in which film export had flourished, thanks to the weak currency. Besides, the high period of the epic film was gradually passing - the sensation value of the enormous crowd scenes and of scantily clad actresses was falling.

== Cast ==
- María Corda as Merapi, The Moon of Israel
- Adelqui Migliar (as Adelqui Millar) as Prinz Seti
- Arlette Marchal as Userti
- Ferdinand Bonn as Ana
- Oskar Beregi Sr. as Amenmeses
- Adolf Weisse as Pharaoh Menapta
- Hans Marr as Moses
- Reinhold Häussermann as Pampasa
- Georges Haryton as Laban
- Emil Heise as Khi, the High Priest
- Boris Baranoff as Merapi's father
- Hans Thimig

=== Sets and costumes ===
The sets and buildings were created by Artur Berger and Emil Stepanek, who already had experience of monumental epics, having worked on the greatest film structure in Austrian film history, the Tower of Babel in Sodom und Gomorrha of 1922. The costumes were by Remigius Geyling. The great majority of the cast were very simply dressed, but the palace residents and the priests had some of the most imaginative and creative costumes of the silent film period.

== Background ==
Like other films of the period the Die Sklavenkönigin was inspired by the Egyptomania that was sweeping the world after the discovery of the intact tomb and treasures of the Pharaoh Tutankhamun. The female lead, for once, was not the director's wife, as in most of Michael Kertész's previous films: Lucy Doraine was by this time divorced from him, and so the starring role went to María Corda, the wife of his competitor Alexander Korda, who was also making epics in Vienna at this time.

The premiere took place in the Eos-Kino, in which Sascha-Film had an interest. For the occasion the cinema was done up in Ancient Egyptian style and decorated with pictures of gods and statues of warriors.

== Versions ==
The black-and-white silent 35 mm film, 2,300 metres long, had a sound track added in 1932 by the Selenophon Licht- und Tonbildgesellschaft; without the intertitles it was only 2,074 metres long.

In 2005 using a positive print on a nitrate base of the English edition from the British Film Institute, the film was restored by the Filmarchiv Austria, thus re-creating a print of excellent quality with English intertitles which was used for the reconstruction of the German version, with added music by the leading Austrian silent film pianist Gerhard Gruber.

== Critics ==
- Paimann's Filmlisten, October 1924: "In the foreground is the lavish and totally successful composition of the image, its impressive crowd scenes and the impressive structures which are made real by a photography beyond all reproach. The subject is dramatically effective, with many beautiful moments, while the direction is not exhausting in tempo."
- Paimann's Filmlisten gave another, indirect, critique in its edition of 11 September 1925 while discussing the US epic The Ten Commandments: "the technical execution, particularly in the coloured scenes, is highly praiseworthy, although we have already seen the Crossing of Red Sea done better in a Viennese film."
- The New York Times, 29 June 1927: "There is naturally much that is mindful of Cecil B. DeMille’s Film The Ten Commandments in The Moon Of Israel, but Mr. Curtiz fortunately has no modern story to tack on to his Egyptian passages. This is an excellent production."

== See also ==
- Michael Curtiz filmography
