= The Arsonists of Europe =

1926 film directed by Max Neufeld

- Directed by: Max Neufeld
- Written by: Jacques Bachrach
- Produced by: Max Neufeld
- Starring: Charlotte Ander; Eugen Neufeld; Robert Valberg
- Cinematography: Eduard Hoesch
- Production company: Max Neufeld-Film
- Release date: 17 September 1926
- Country: Austria
- Languages: Silent; German intertitles

The Arsonists of Europe (German: Die Brandstifter Europas) is a 1926 Austrian silent drama film directed by Max Neufeld and starring Charlotte Ander, Eugen Neufeld and Robert Valberg. It was shot at the Sievering Studios in Vienna. The film's sets were designed by Artur Berger.

== Cast ==
- Max Neufeld as Rasputin
- Eugen Neufeld as Großfürst
- Robert Valberg as Oberst Redl
- Albert von Kersten as Michael Korsakow
- Albert Heine as Purischkjewitsch
- Eugen Dumont as Wladimir Iljitsch Lenin
- Hans Marr as Iwan Avadieff
- Charlotte Ander as Olga
- Victor Kutschera as Chef des russischen Spionagedienstes
- Heinz Hanus as Zar Nikolaus II
- Hermann Benke as Oberst Wronsky
- Renati Renee as Tänzerin Sonja Starewna
- Fritz Freisler as Kriegsminister
- Lorenz Corvinus as General Schamovsky
- Viktor Braun as Oberst Graf Sumarokow
- Wilhelm Schmidt as Major Gregoriew
- K. Loibner as Zarewitsch
- Herma Exdorf as Janischkaja
- Ignaz Flemminger as Major Talam
- Margarete Thumann

== Bibliography ==
- Grange, William. Cultural Chronicle of the Weimar Republic. Scarecrow Press, 2008.
