= Café Elektric =

1927 film

- Film poster
- Directed by: Gustav Ucicky
- Written by: Jacques Bachrach; Felix Fischer (play)
- Produced by: Count Sascha Kolowrat-Krakowski
- Starring: Marlene Dietrich; Willi Forst
- Cinematography: Hans Androschin
- Music by: Gerhard Gruber
- Distributed by: Sascha-Film
- Release date: 25 November 1927
- Running time: 80 minutes
- Country: Austria
- Language: Silent

Café Elektric is a 1927 Austrian silent drama film directed by Gustav Ucicky.

== Plot ==
Erni, the daughter of a wealthy industrialist Göttlinger falls for a pickpocket Fredl, but Fredl prefers Hansi, a prostitute at the Café Elektric. Max who is a Göttlinger architect, loves Erni, until he discovers her relationship with Fredl. Recuperating at the Café Elektric, Max falls in love with Hansi. Göttlinger also liked Hansi, so he fired Max. Max now lives in need with reformed Hansi, but leaves her when he suspects she has returned to prostitution. At the Café Elektric Fredl stabs Hansi. Max now is a reporter who covers the story. Since Hansi is innocent, they reunite.

== Cast ==
- Willi Forst as Fredl
- Marlene Dietrich as Erni Göttlinger
- Fritz Alberti as Kommerzialrat Göttlinger
- Anny Coty as Göttlingers Freundin
- Igo Sym as Max Stöger, Göttlinger's architect
- Vera Salvotti as Paula
- Nina Vanna as Hansi
- Dolly Davis
- Albert Kersten as Herr. Zerner
