= Erzberg mine =

Iron ore mine in Austria

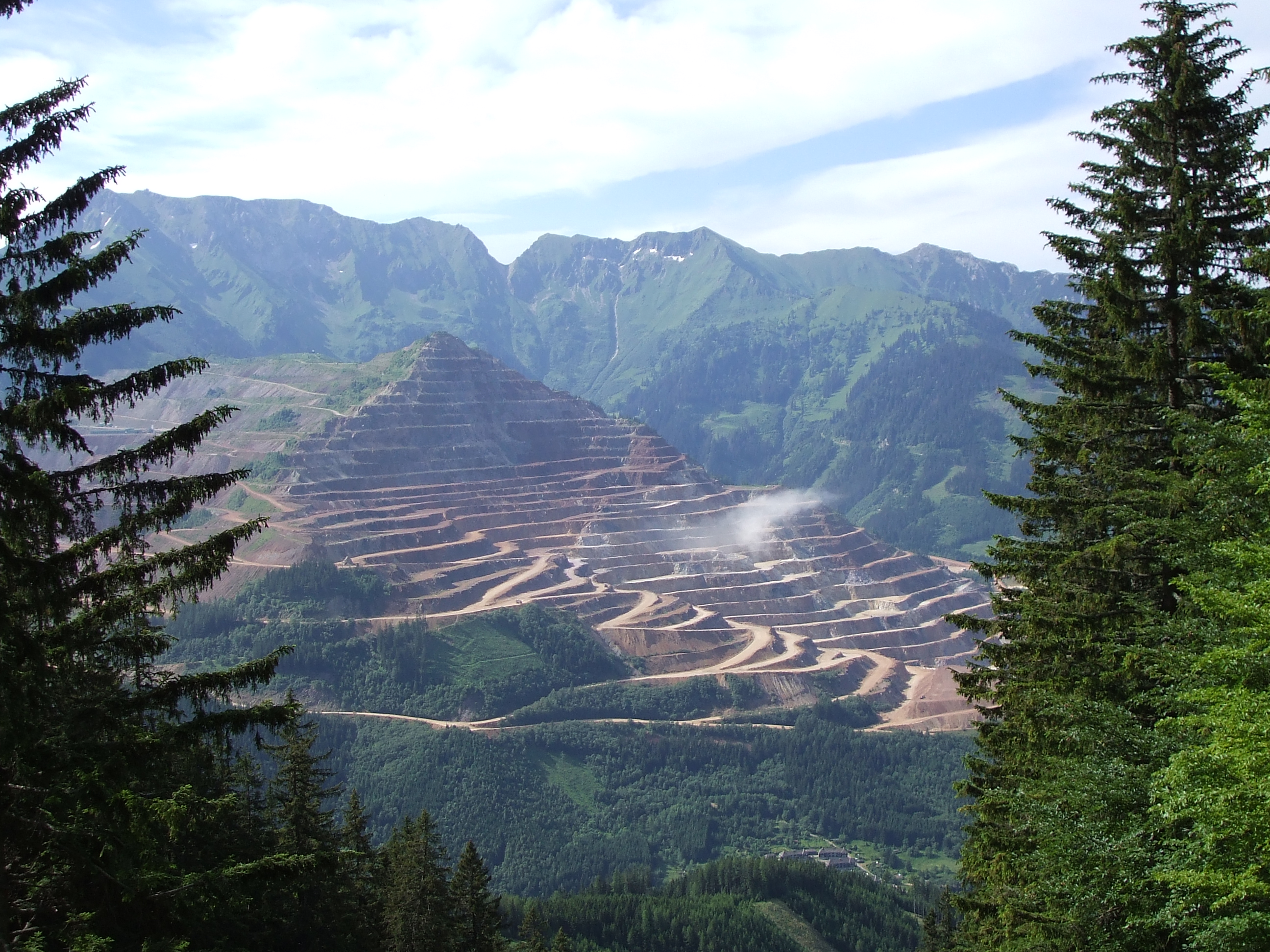

- Location in Austria
- Location: Eisenerz, Styria, Austria; 47°31′30″N 014°54′42″E
- Products: Iron ore
- Production: 2,153,000 tonnes of iron ore
- Financial year: 2008
- Opened: 1
- Company: Voestalpine

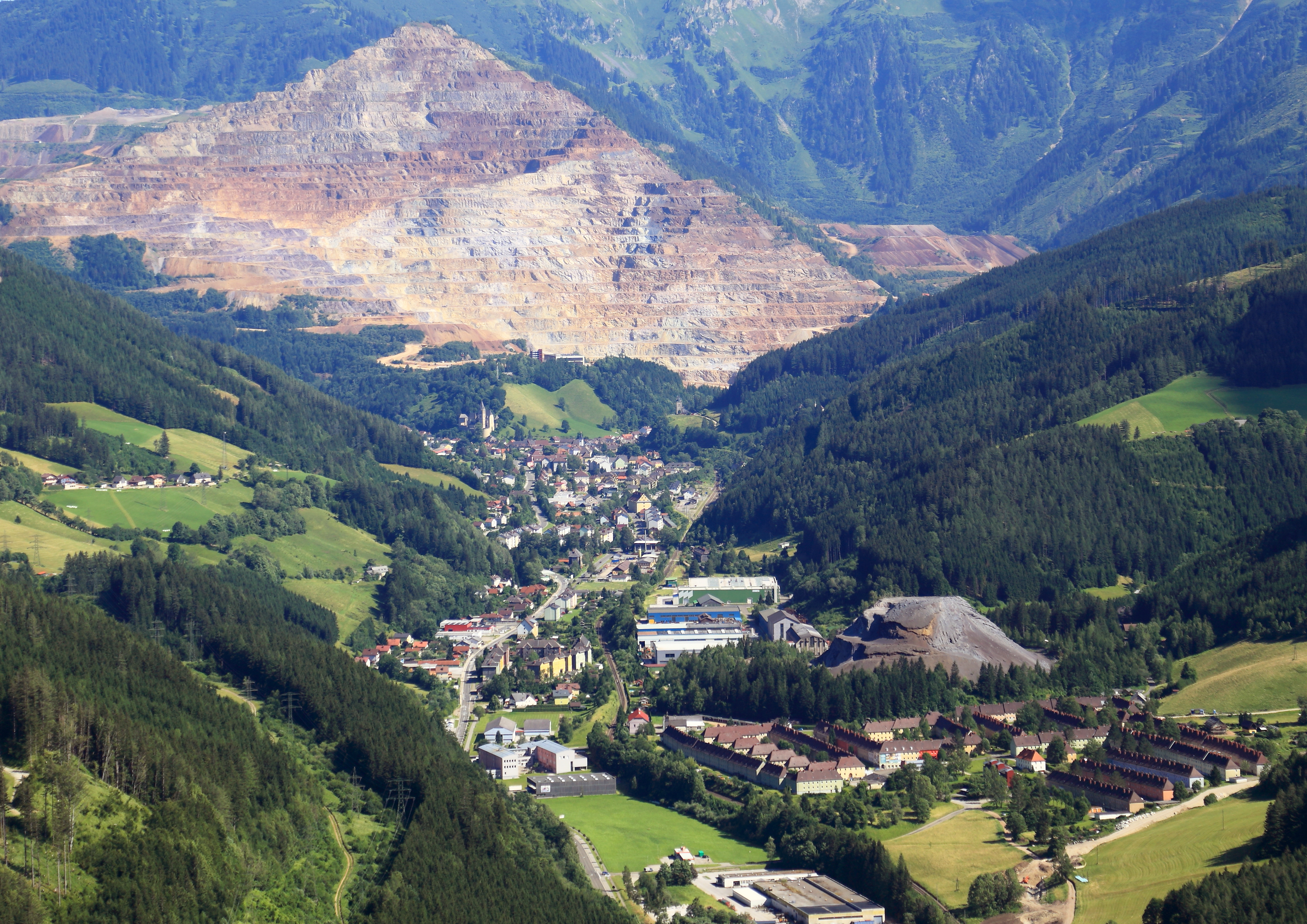
Northwest side of Erzberg and the town Eisenerz

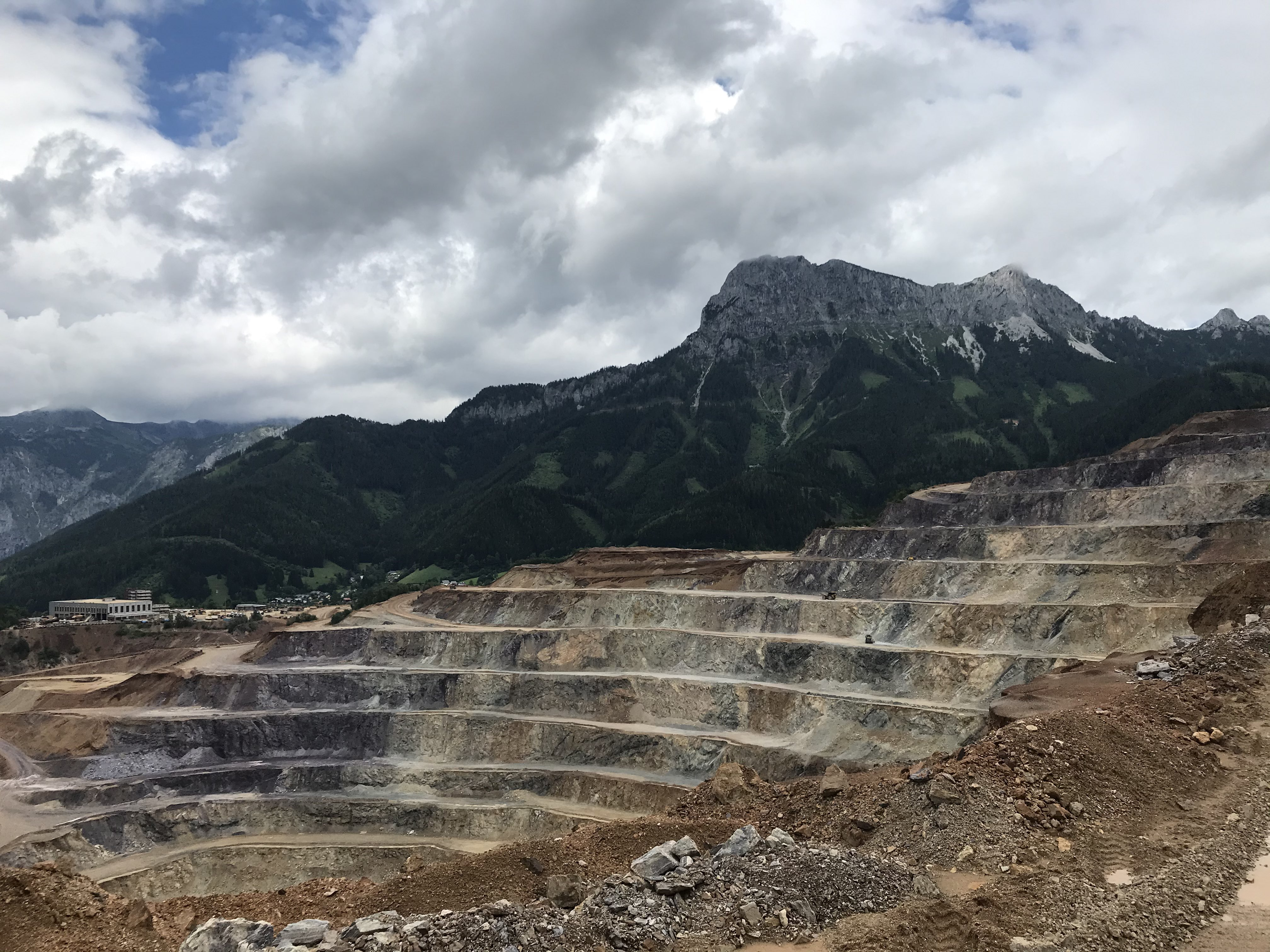
Different layers of the mountain being mined for ore

The Erzberg mine is a large open-pit mine located in Eisenerz, Styria, in the central-western part of Austria, 60 km north-west of Graz and 260 km south-west of the capital, Vienna. Erzberg is the largest iron ore deposit in Austria, having estimated reserves of 235 million tonnes of ore. The mine produces around 3.2 million tonnes of pure iron ore per year. It is also the site of the annual Erzberg Rodeo hard enduro motorbike race.

== Geology ==
The deposit lies at the northern fringe of the eastern greywacke zone, a band of Paleozoic metamorphosed sedimentary rocks that run east–west through the Austrian Alps. Most of the siderite is hosted in Silurian/Devonian marbles which are part of the Noric nappe. The main constituents of the ore are the carbonate minerals siderite, ankerite and ferrous dolomite. The ore's average iron content is 21% iron.

== History ==
Iron has been mined at Erzberg for more than 1,300 years. The Oswaldikirche Catholic church in the mining town of Eisenerz, adjoining the site, had a document that dated the commencement of mining there to 712AD, although this is unconfirmed. Initially, surface mining took place. Limonite was found close to the surface and was mined in the 12th century, with exploitation rights accorded by territorial rulers. It was smelted in small forges near the pits and miners had little more than subsistence livelihoods.

Underground mining began in the 16th century using hammer and pick, on the orders of the Austrian emperor. The upper part was mined by the townsfolk of Vordernberg and the lower by the more local people of Innerberg (former name of Eisenerz). In the valley of Eisenerz and Vordernberg Radwerke forges were built, powered by water wheels leading to bellows, encouraging further settlement. On the mountain, black powder, the earliest known chemical explosive, was tried in 1720 and in 1870, dynamite. In 1876, electrical cables (or fuses) were used to connect to the blasting cap. Boreholes to house the explosive material were dug manually. From 1906, carbide acetylene lamps and percussion drills were used, powered by compressed air in pipelines. Hydraulic drill rigs are the current technology.

The process of turning ore into iron was tough in the first few centuries. Ore was carried out manually and taken to the valley Radwerke using primitive sleighs, Sackzug, with women assisting, before horses and carts were available. From 1810 to 1870 the shafts and tunnels were equipped with rails and miners' carts, although the routes changed according to new digs.

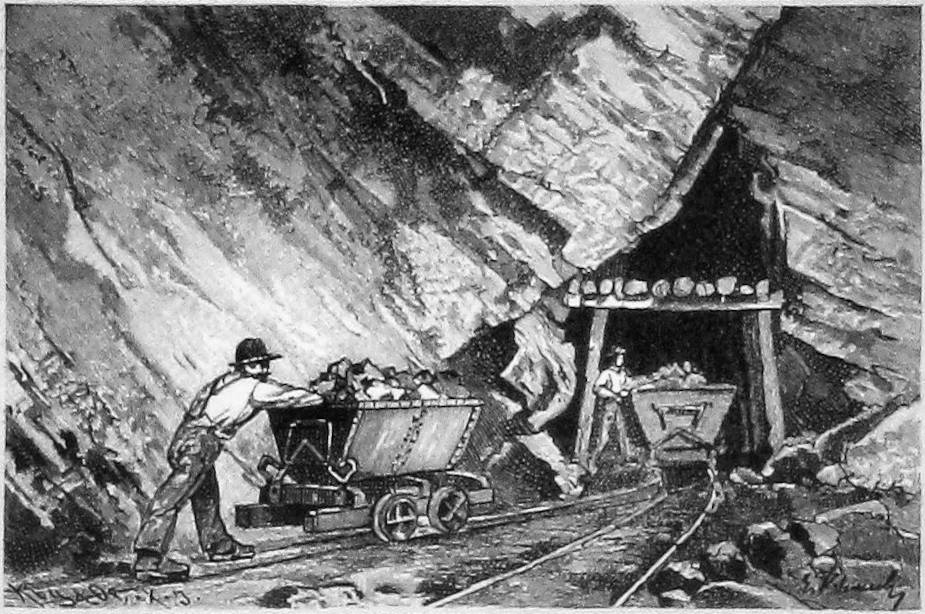
Underground mining

The mine in 1957

Ore production increased in the 20th century. Mine trucks appeared in 1951, replacing carts and rails by 1963, except for transport outside the mine to blast furnaces. Eventually a loading station was built down slope in the valley. Technological advances including automation and remote control of operations led to major job losses and the contraction of the mine workforce. Nonetheless, wooden and then brick dormitories were built to house the workforce. The funicular railway, the "Hugo-Stinnes Aufzug", transported workers more quickly to the mine site from town.

Underground mining was replaced by open pit terraces from 1890. The mine is a multi-level, terraced open-pit, gradually eating into an iron-rich mountain that was once mined via the tunnels and galleries.

The tunnels may still be visited by a tourist train. Ore is shipped in two directions, to Voestalpine AG, based in Linz, and south to Donawitz, a smelter with plans to be based on renewable energy by 2027. The mine is believed to have adequate iron ore for several decades.

== See also ==
- Noric steel
