= Heinz Hanus =

Austrian actor

- Born: 24 May 1882; Vienna, Austria-Hungary (now Austria)
- Died: 16 March 1972 (aged 89); Bad Aussee, Austria
- Occupations: Actor, film director
- Years active: 1908-1970
- Relatives: Emmerich Hanus (brother)

Heinz Hanus (24 May 1882 – 16 March 1972) was an Austrian actor and film director. He directed 21 films between 1908 and 1929. His younger brother was actor and film director Emmerich Hanus.

== Selected filmography ==
- Der Gevatter Tod (Godfather Death) (1921)
- William Ratcliff (1922)
- The Arsonists of Europe (1926)
- A Precocious Girl (1934)
