= Miss Madame (1923 film) =

1923 film

- Directed by: Hans Theyer
- Written by: Hans Theyer
- Produced by: Alexander Kolowrat; Arnold Pressburger
- Starring: Renati Renee; Albert von Kersten; Ica von Lenkeffy
- Cinematography: Nicolas Farkas
- Production company: Sascha-Film
- Release date: 31 August 1923
- Country: Austria
- Languages: Silent; German intertitles

Miss Madame (German: Fräulein Frau) is a 1923 Austrian silent film directed by Hans Theyer and starring Renati Renee, Albert von Kersten and Ica von Lenkeffy.

== Cast ==
- Renati Renee
- Albert von Kersten
- Ica von Lenkeffy
- Hugo Werner-Kahle

== Bibliography ==
- Jan Distelmeyer. Alliierte für den Film: Arnold Pressburger, Gregor Rabinowitsch und die Cine-Allianz. 2004.
