= William Ratcliff (film) =

1922 film directed by Heinz Hanus

- Directed by: Heinz Hanus
- Written by: Heinrich Heine (play); Paul Dengler
- Starring: Oscar Beregi Sr.; Hanna Ralph; Albert von Kersten
- Cinematography: Hans Androschin
- Production company: Astoria-Film
- Release date: 30 October 1922
- Country: Austria
- Languages: Silent; German intertitles

William Ratcliff is a 1922 Austrian silent film directed by Heinz Hanus and starring Oscar Beregi Sr., Hanna Ralph and Albert von Kersten.

== Cast ==
- Oscar Beregi Sr. as Leo Dubois
- Manja Keller
- Georg Kundert
- Hanna Ralph
- Annie Röttgen
- Armin Seydelmann
- Rudolf Sichra
- Else Strohlendorf
- Albert von Kersten

== Bibliography ==
- Paolo Caneppele & Günter Krenn. Elektrische Schatten. Filmarchiv Austria, 1999.
