= John Smith Chartres =

Irish civil servant and revolutionary

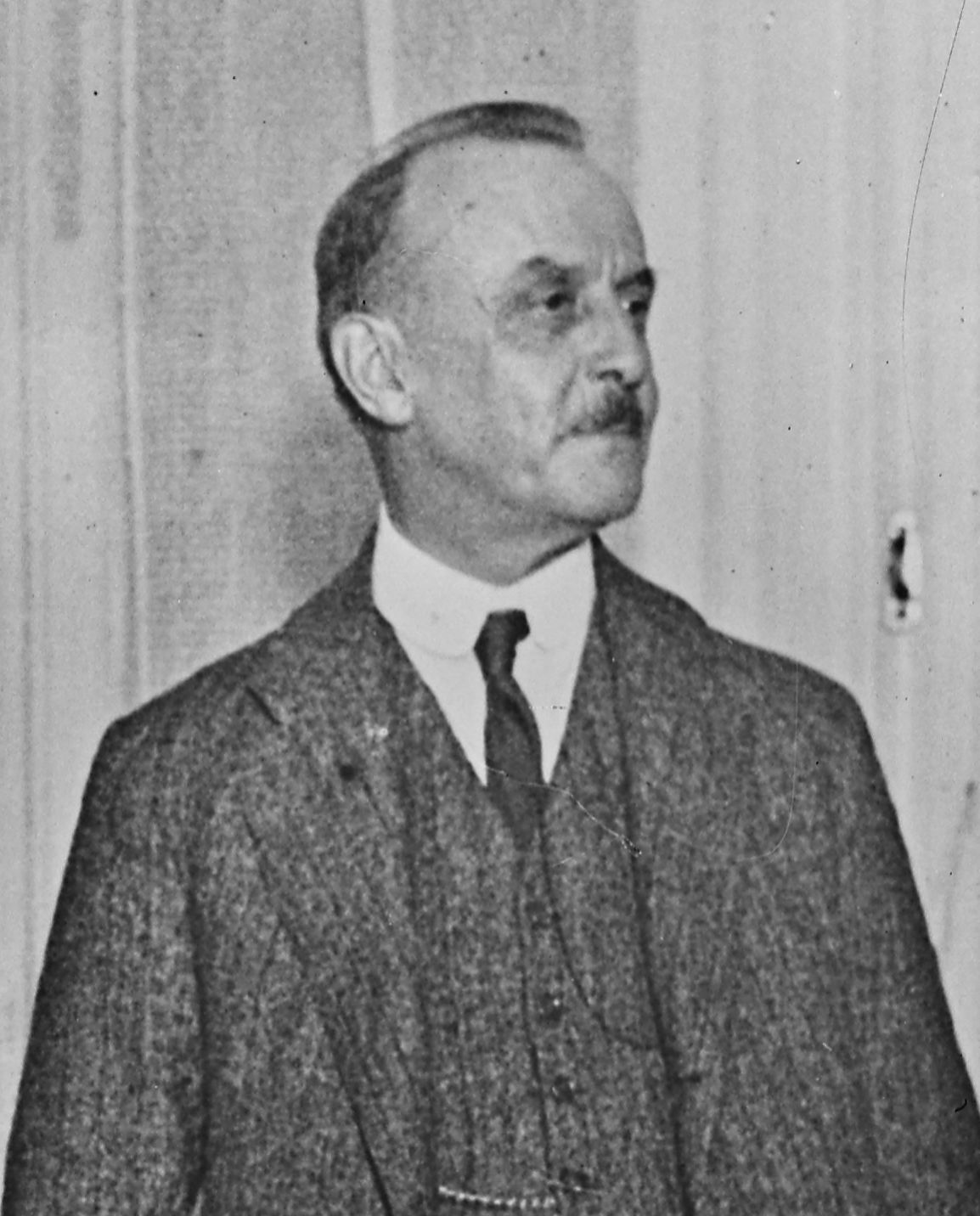
Chartres in London during the negotiations of the Anglo-Irish Treaty, 1921

John Smith Chartres (5 October 1862 – 14 May 1927) was a lawyer, Irish civil servant and revolutionary. Chartres was born in England to Irish parents and spent time as a child in Ireland. After years in the news business in London and British civil service he retired in 1921. He served as the second secretary to the Anglo-Irish Treaty delegation and was greatly trusted by the Irish leader Michael Collins.

== Bibliography ==
Murphy, Brian (1995). John Chartres: Mystery Man of the Treaty. Dublin: Irish Academic Press. ISBN 978-0-716-52543-1
