= Eisenerz =

- Municipality
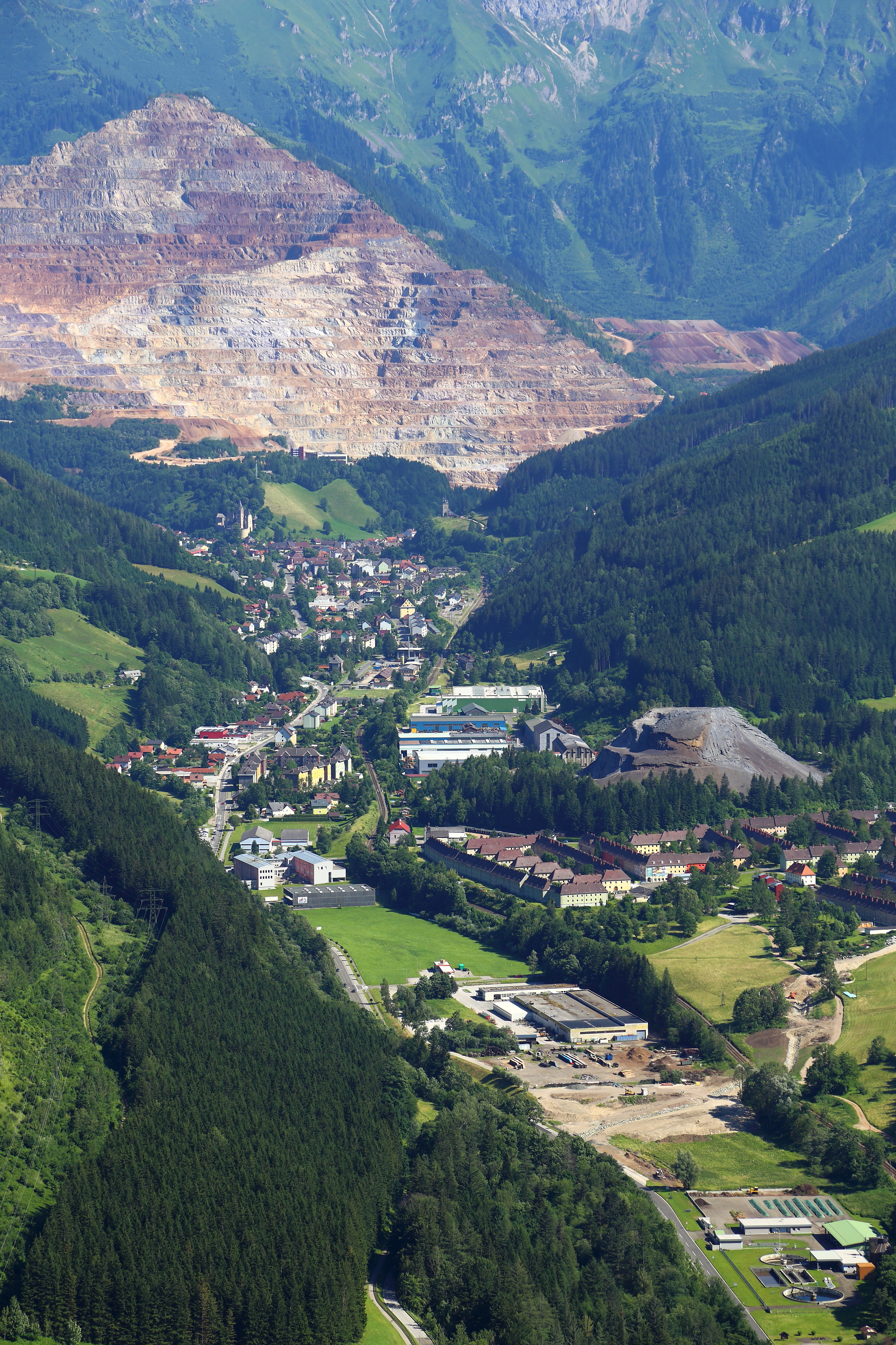
- Eisenerz with Erzberg

- Coat of arms

- Location within Austria
- Coordinates: 47°33′00″N 14°53′00″E
- Country: Austria
- State: Styria
- District: Leoben

Government
  - Mayor: Thomas Rauninger (ÖVP)

Area
  - Total: 124.69 km^{2} (48.14 sq mi)
- Elevation: 736 m (2,415 ft)

Population (2018-01-01)
  - Total: 4,048
  - Density: 32.46/km^{2} (84.08/sq mi)
- Time zone: UTC+1 (CET)
  - Summer (DST): UTC+2 (CEST)
- Postal code: 8790
- Area code: 03848
- Vehicle registration: LN
- Website: https://www.eisenerz.at/

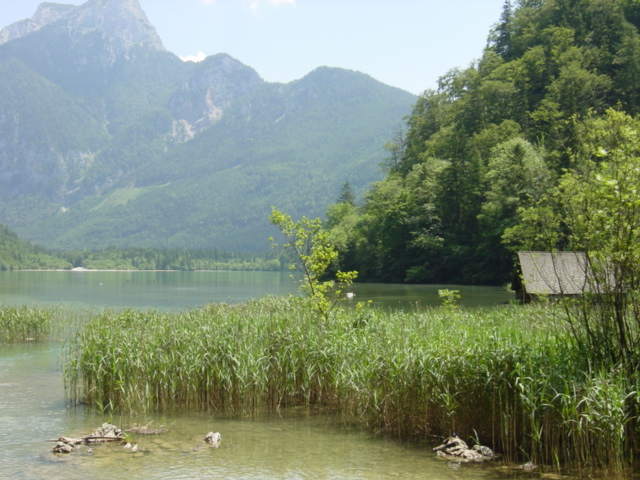
Leopoldstein Lake

Eisenerz (German pronunciation: [ˈaɪzn̩ˌʔeːɐ̯ts]; "Iron ore") is a market place and old mining town in the Austrian state of Styria, 68 mi (109 km). northwest of Graz by rail. It is situated in the deep Erzbach Valley, dominated on the east by the Pfaffenstein 1,871 m (6,138 ft), on the west by the Kaiserschild 2,084 m (6,837 ft), and on the south by the Erzberg 1,465 m (4,806 ft). It has a medieval fortified church, a Gothic edifice founded by Rudolph of Habsburg in the 13th century and rebuilt in the 16th century.

At the turn of the past century the Erzberg (Ore Mountain) furnished such rich ore that it was quarried in the open air like stone, in the summer months. There is documentary evidence of the mines having been worked as far back as the 12th century. They afforded employment to two or three thousand hands in summer and about half as many in winter, and yielded some 800,000 tons of iron per annum.

During World War II, a subcamp of Mauthausen concentration camp, "KZ-Außenlager Gsollgraben", was located adjacent the Erzberg, in the village Gsollgraben. Its precise location and dimensions could be reconstructed for the first time in 2020, under the supervision of an interdisciplinary team of scholars at TU Graz. The subcamp provided slave labour for local industry.

Eisenerz was connected with the mines by the Erzberg Railway, a bold piece of engineering work, fourteen miles (23 km) long, constructed on the Abt's rack-and-pinion system. It passed through the pastoral scenery, before descending to Vordernberg, a center of the iron trade situated on the south side of the Erzberg. Eisenerz then possessed, in addition, twenty-five furnaces, which produce iron, and particularly steel, of high quality. Today the Erzberg is home to motocross races, called the Erzberg Rodeo.

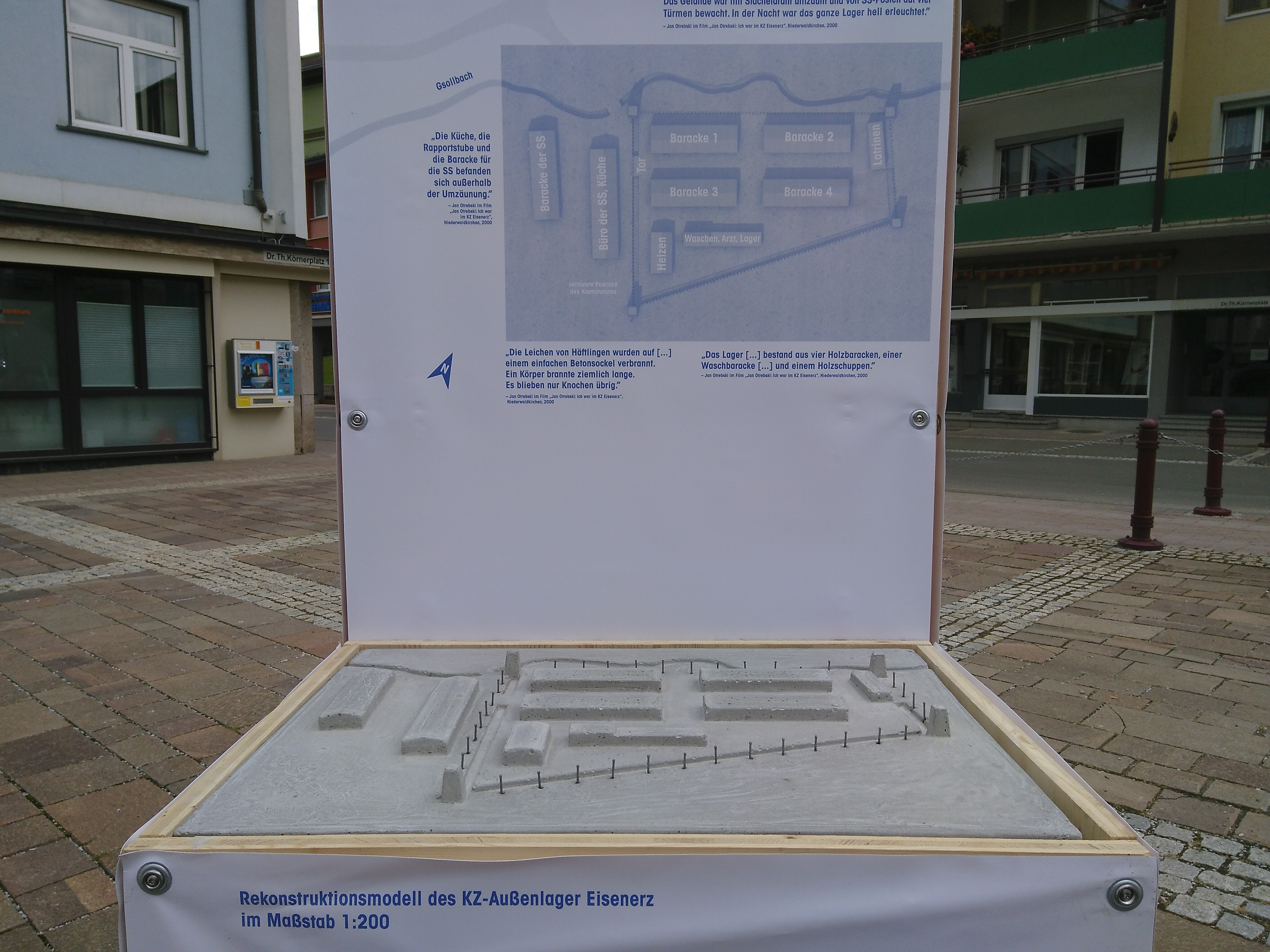
The "KZ-Außenlager Gsollgraben" reconstructed in 2020.

Eisenerz is also the home of the independent record label Napalm Records, which is mainly focused on heavy metal and hard rock. While founded in 1992 in Eisenerz, the company has since become a prominent label in the metal scene, and today operates branch offices in Berlin and New York.

A few miles northwest of Eisenerz stands Leopoldstein Castle, and near it Leopoldstein Lake. This lake, with its dark green water at an elevation of 2,028 feet (618 m), and surrounded on all sides by high peaks, is not large and has a depth of 100 ft (30 m).

== History ==
In Eisenerz, copper smelting was a major activity from the 15th century to the 13th century BC.

== Population ==
Historical population

Year	Pop.	±%
1869	3,850	—
1880	4,148	+7.7%
1890	5,740	+38.4%
1900	6,517	+13.5%
1910	7,587	+16.4%
1923	8,674	+14.3%
1934	6,685	−22.9%
1939	11,378	+70.2%

Year	Pop.	±%
1951	12,948	+13.8%
1961	12,435	−4.0%
1971	11,617	−6.6%
1981	10,068	−13.3%
1991	7,759	−22.9%
2001	6,435	−17.1%
2011	4,826	−25.0%
2021	3,625	−24.9%

Source: Statistics Austria

== Notable people ==
- Reinhold Bachler (born 1944), an Austrian former ski jumper, silver medallist at the 1968 Winter Olympics
- Andreas Schranz (born 1979), an Austrian former football goalkeeper who played 298 games and 6 for Austria
- Daniela Iraschko-Stolz (born 1983), an Austrian former ski jumper and footballer, silver medallist at the 2014 Winter Olympics
- Lukas Klapfer (born 1985), an Austrian Nordic combined skier who won bronze at the 2014 and 2018 Winter Olympics
