= Rudolf Lindau (diplomat) =

German diplomat and author

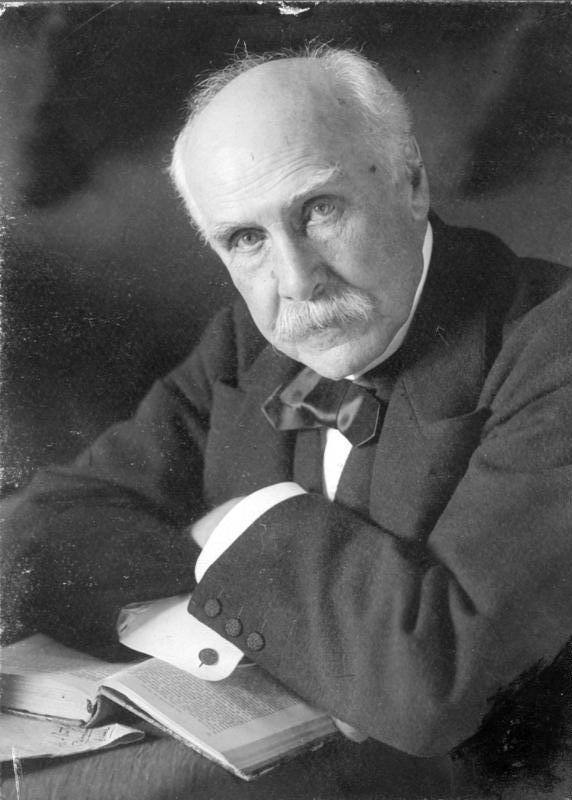
Rudolf Lindau

Rudolf Lindau (10 October 1829 in Gardelegen, Saxony – 14 October 1910) was a German diplomat and author.

== Early life ==
Rudolf was the son of Carl Lindau, a lawyer (Justizkommissar) whose parents Hertz Levin (a physician) and Henriette Cohen had converted from Judaism to Protestantism. Hertz Levin changed his name to Hermann Lindau after conversion. Rudolf was the brother of Paul Lindau, a well-known dramatist and novelist.

== Milestones ==
Lindau was responsible for commanding the first Swiss delegation to Japan on 28 April 1859, along with Swiss Aimé Humbert-Droz (who was appointed the envoy plenipotentiary for the Swiss federal government). Before returning to Germany, he edited the English newspaper in Yokohama.

Later, Lindau was employed in the service of Otto von Bismarck. Bismarck was so impressed with Lindau's understanding of French politics and press that in 1879 he appointed him as head of the German Foreign office's press bureau.

== Works ==
Lindau's novels and tales were collected during 1893 (Berlin, 6 vols.). His works Reisegefährten and Der lange Holländer involve the lives of European residents in the Far East.
