= Paul Lindau =

German dramatist and novelist

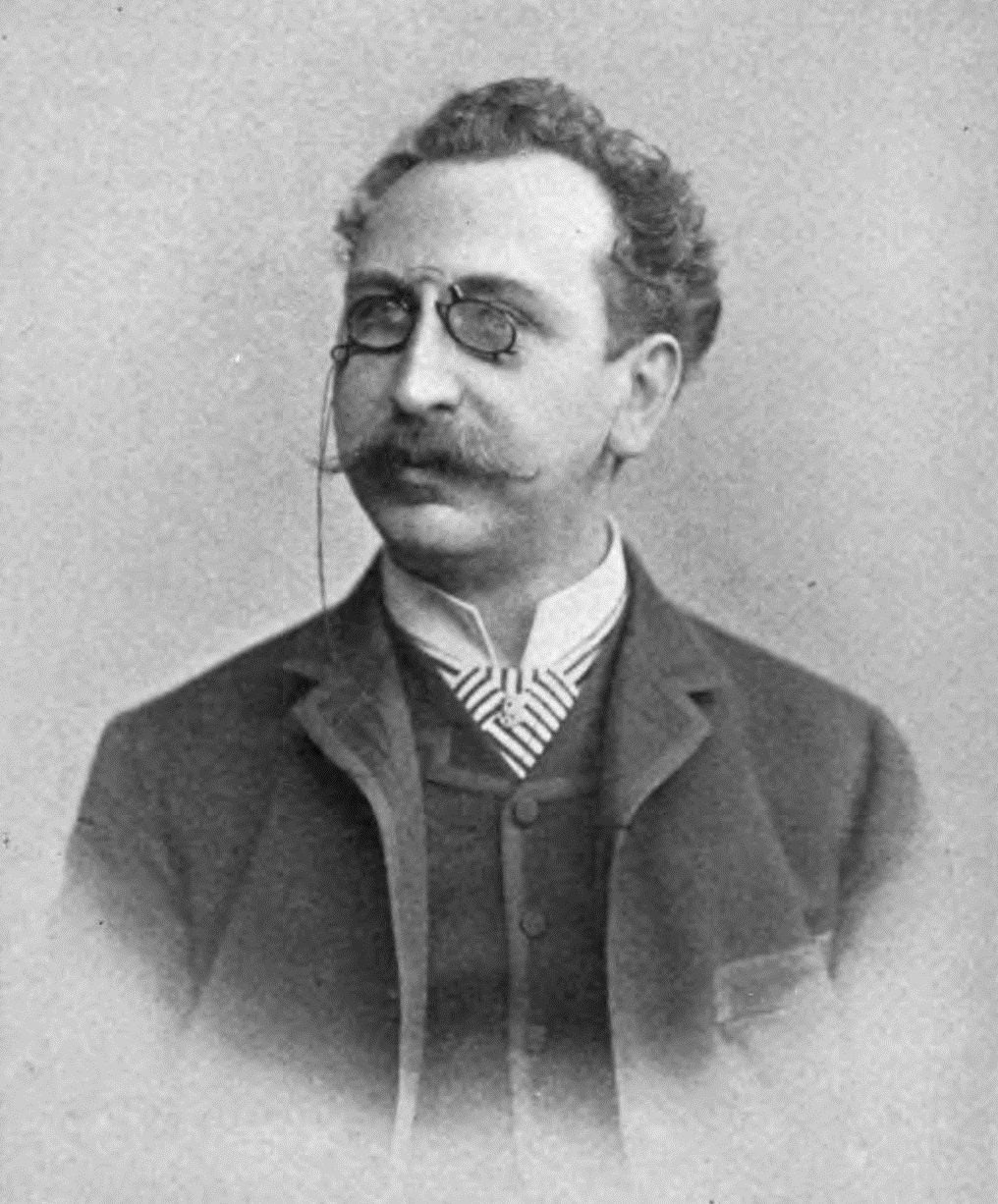
Paul Lindau.

Paul Lindau (3 June 1839 – 31 January 1919) was a German dramatist and novelist.

== Life and works ==
Lindau was born in Magdeburg as the son of Carl Lindau, a lawyer (Justizkommissar) whose parents Hertz Levin (a physician) and Henriette Cohen had converted from Judaism to Protestantism. Hertz Levin changed his name to Hermann Lindau after conversion. Paul was educated at Halle, Leipzig, and Berlin. He spent five years in Paris to further his studies, acting meanwhile as foreign correspondent to German papers. After his return to Germany in 1863 he was engaged in journalism in Düsseldorf and Elberfeld. In 1870 he founded Das neue Blatt at Leipzig; from 1872 to 1881 he edited the Berlin weekly Die Gegenwart; and in 1878 he founded the well-known monthly Nord und Süd, which he continued to edit until 1904.

Two books of travel, Aus Venetien (Düsseldorf, 1864) and Aus Paris (Stuttgart, 1865), were followed by some volumes of critical studies, written in a light, satirical vein, which at once made him famous. These were Harmlose Briefe eines deutschen Kleinstädters (Leipzig, 2 vols., 1870), Moderne Märchen fur grosse Kinder (Leipzig, 1870) and Literarische Rücksichtslosigkeiten (Leipzig, 1871). He was appointed intendant of the court theatre at Meiningen in 1895, but removed to Berlin in 1899, where he became manager of the Berliner Theater, and subsequently, until 1905, the Deutsches Theater.

He began his dramatic career in 1868 with Marion, the first of a long series of plays in which he displayed a remarkable talent for stage effect and a command of witty and lively dialogue. Among the more famous were Maria und Magdalena (1872), Tante Therese (1876), Gräfin Lea (1879), Die Erste (1895), Der Abend (1896), Der Herr im Hause (1899), and So ich dir (1903). He also adapted many plays by Dumas, Augier and Sardou for the German stage. Five volumes of his plays were published (Berlin, 1873–1888). Some of his volumes of short stories acquired great popularity, notably Herr und Frau Bewer (Breslau, 1882) and Toggenburg und andere Geschichten (Breslau, 1883). A novel-sequence entitled Berlin included Der Zug nach dem Westen (Stuttgart, 1886, 10th ed. 1903), Arme Mädchen (1887, 9th ed. 1905) and Spitzen (1888, 8th ed. 1904). Later novels were Die Gehilfin (Breslau, 1894), Die Brüder (Dresden, 1895) and Der König von Sidon (Breslau, 1898). His earlier books on Molière (Leipzig, 1871) and Alfred de Musset (Berlin, 1877) were followed by some volumes of dramatic and literary criticism, Gesammelte Aufsätze (Berlin, 1875), Dramaturgische Blätter (Stuttgart, 2 vols., 1875; new series, Breslau, 1878, 2 vols.), and Vorspiele auf dem Theater (Breslau, 1895).

== Brother ==
His brother, Rudolf Lindau (1829–1910), was a well-known diplomat and author.
