= Imperial and Royal War Press Headquarters =

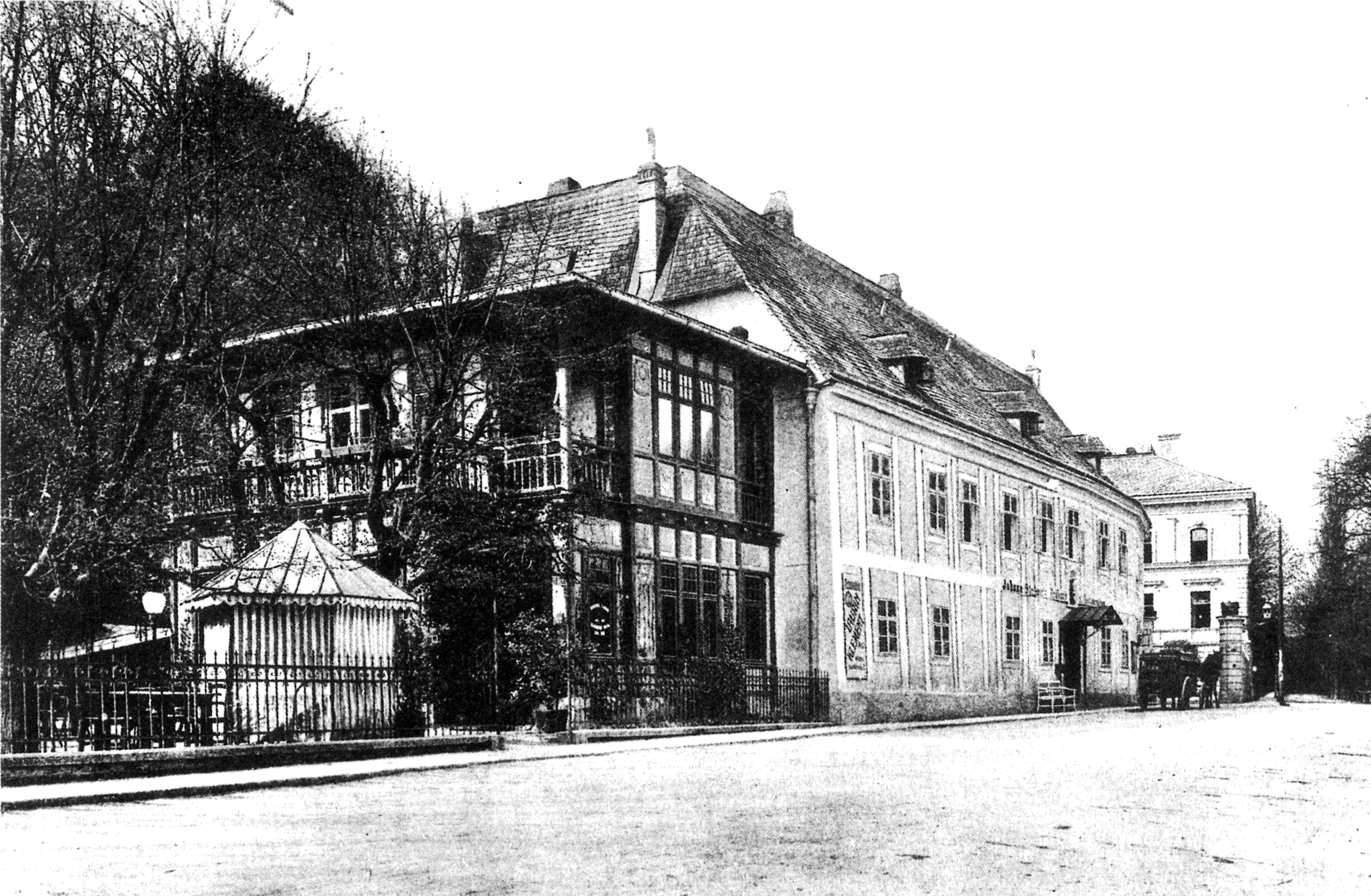
Offices of the Kriegspressequartier in the Gasthaus Stelzer in Rodaun near Vienna (1900)

The Imperial and Royal War Press Headquarters (German: “Das Kaiserliche und königliche Kriegspressequartier”) (KPQ) was established at the beginning of the First World War on 28 July 1914 as a department of the Austro-Hungarian Army High Command. The task of the KPQ was to coordinate all press information and propaganda activities, including all mass media available at the time. A total of 550 artists and journalists were active as members of the KPQ during the war, including 280 in the KPQ artists group. From the start of the war its commanding officer was Major General Maximilian Ritter von Hoen. From March 1917 until the end of the war Colonel Wilhelm Eisner-Bubna was in charge.

== Contributors ==
In 1914 the K.u.k. Telegraphen-Korrespondenz-Bureau (known today as APA) was absorbed into the KPQ. Soon after the outbreak of war, the importance of photography and film for effective public relations was also recognized, alongside the more traditional fields of writing and the fine arts. The KPQ engaged the services of many of Austra-Hungary’s most famous and established creative names, including Albert Paris Gütersloh, Alfred Kubin, Egon Erwin Kisch, Robert Musil, Leo Perutz, Alice Schalek, Hugo von Hofmannsthal, Roda Roda, Rainer Maria Rilke, Alfred Polgar, Franz Karl Ginzkey, Franz Theodor Csokor, Felix Salten, Stefan Zweig, Ferenc Molnár, Robert Michel und Franz Werfel. They worked with the KPQ for different reasons - some were enthusiastic and patriotic volunteers, others wished to evade conscription, and others still were ordered to work for the war effort.

There were a great many applications for admission to the KPQ, but the acceptance criteria were very strict. As the war drew on they became stricter as all reasonably able-bodied men were needed at the front. When recruiting, care was taken to balance the contributors by origin, drawing in both the cisleithan and transleithan parts of the empire.

In the KPQ, and above all in the art group, women were accepted, contrary to the military norms of the time. The oldest of them, de:Fritzi Ulreich (1865–1936), went to the south-eastern front in Belgrade in 1914 and painted the ruined fortifications there, as well as military cemeteries and individual graves. de:Helene Arnau (1870–1958) painted from February to May 1917 on the Carinthian front. The youngest, Stephanie Hollenstein (1886–1944) even disguised herself as a man in order to be able to go into battle with the Standschützen.

== Media ==
=== Writing ===
Press reports were written for the KPQ by writers and journalists, among them the first officially licensed female war report writer in history, Alice Schalek.

=== Art ===
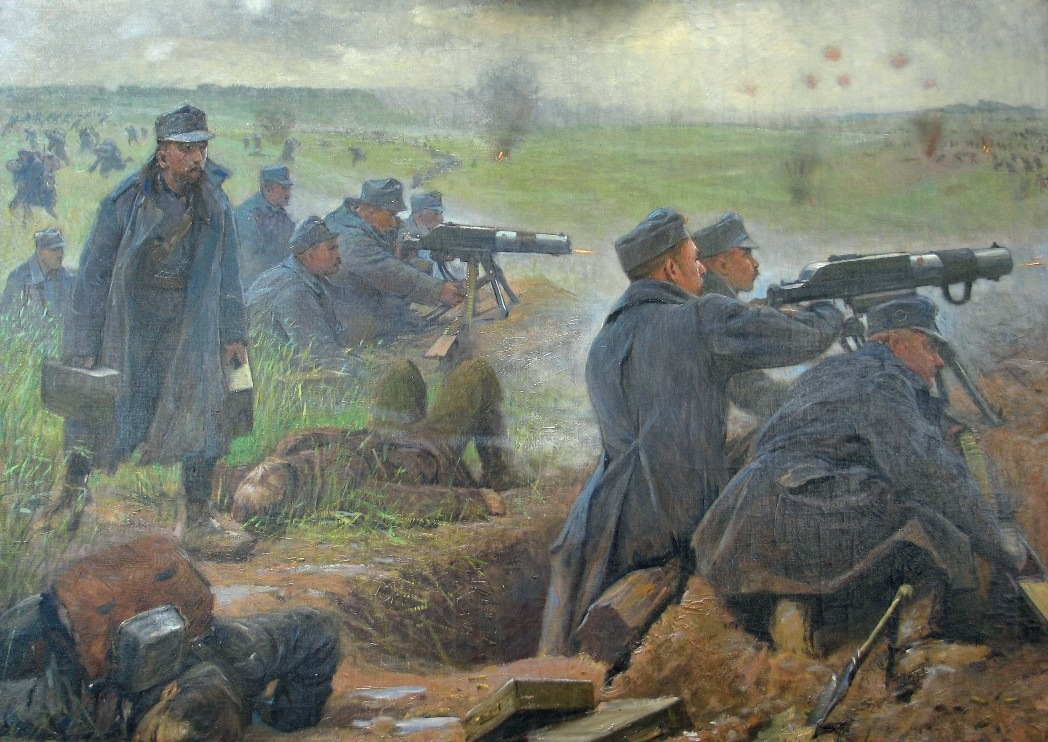
Karl Friedrich Gsur: Machine-gun unit fights defensively, 1915/16

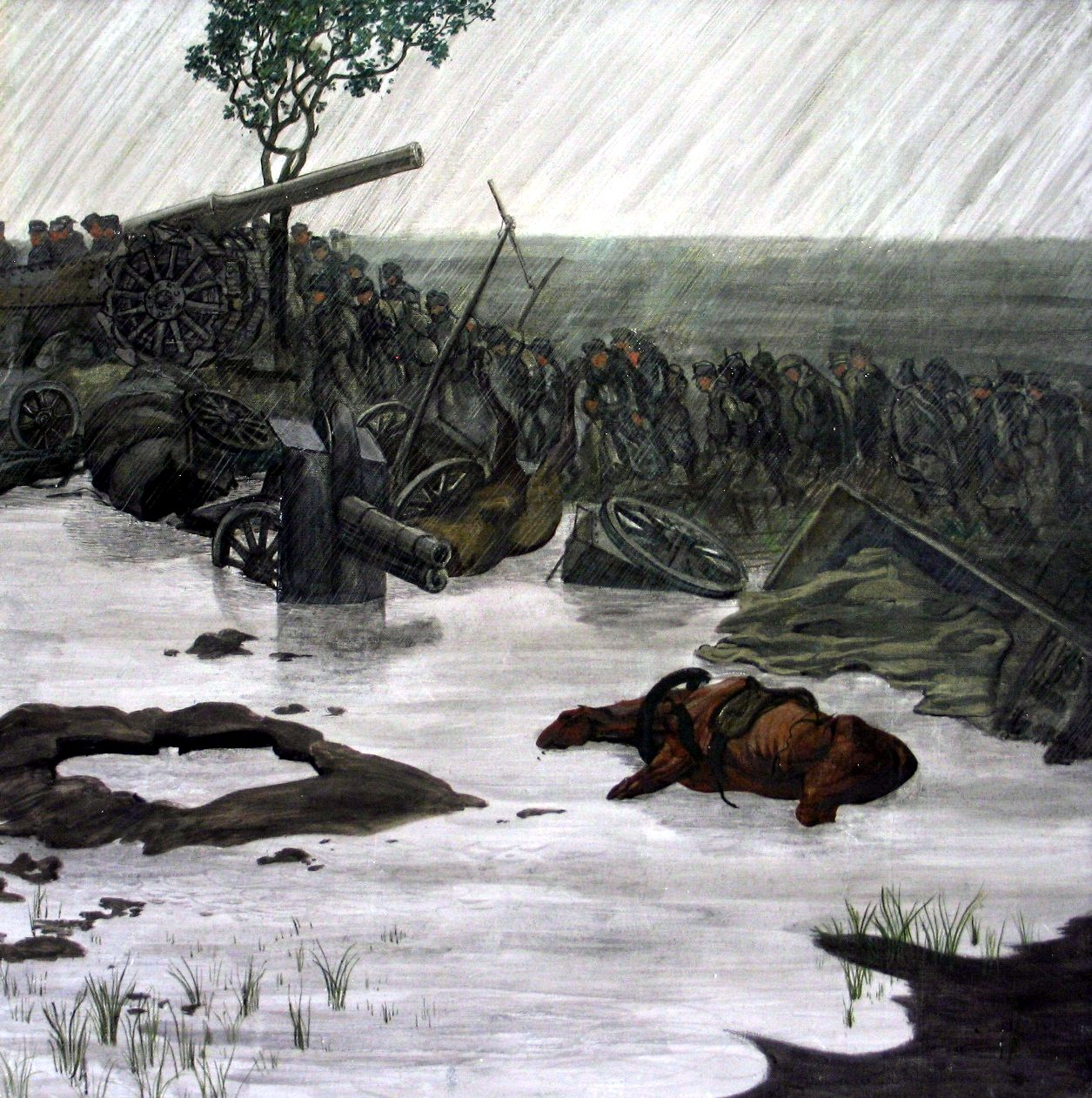
Alfred Basel: After the breakthrough on the Tagliamento, 1918

The artists’ group was directed by Colonel Wilhelm John from 1914 to 1916, and by Major Georg Sobicka from 1916 to 1918 . A great number of pieces were created by this group including paintings, watercolors, drawings, posters, postcards, illustrations, sculptures. The artists were sent to the various fighting fronts with formal credentials to show their status, along with black and yellow armbands labelled "Art" or "War Press Quarters". Their task was defined as creating "propaganda effective for present use at home and abroad in order to put the achievements of the Wehrmacht in a true light, and for future use, as material that will serve to complement through art the written narrative of history and the subsequent glorification of military exploits.”

The artists were required to find "effective and interesting subjects from the life of the war". The front-line troops alongside them were required to support them and see to it that they worked on militarily "useful things" . Landscape painters were expected to draw positions and battlefields, while "those talented in figurative work" suitable as battle painters were given the opportunity to observe battles if possible, preferably from artillery positions in order to reduce personal danger. Portraitists were to produce colored or pencil sketches, of "the higher leaders, especially excellent officers and men". According to the regulations of the KPQ, the guideline was that artists should submit a sketch each week of assignment to the front, and a picture each month away from it. The artists and other contributors had to hand over the works created during their period of service to the KPQ. From there, depending on their suitability, the works were assigned to the Imperial and Royal War Archives, the Imperial and Royal Army Museum or to higher military authorities for permanent decoration of official rooms.

Supporting the artists’ group was the picture collection point, housed in the Academy of Fine Arts Vienna from the spring of 1916. Here pictures were deposited, registered, framed and managed for the various war picture exhibitions. By the end of the war, 33 exhibitions with over 9,000 works had been made in Germany and in neutral or allied countries. [1] The best-known war painters who were members or associates of the KPQ were: Albin Egger-Lienz, Anton Faistauer, Anton Kolig, Ferdinand Andri, Alexander Demetrius Goltz, Oskar Laske, Karl Friedrich Gsur, Ludwig Heinrich Jungnickel, Alexander Pock, Victor von Eckhardt und Oskar Kokoschka. A large number of works by these and other KPQ artists are held the permanent exhibition of the Vienna Army History Museum today.

=== Photography ===
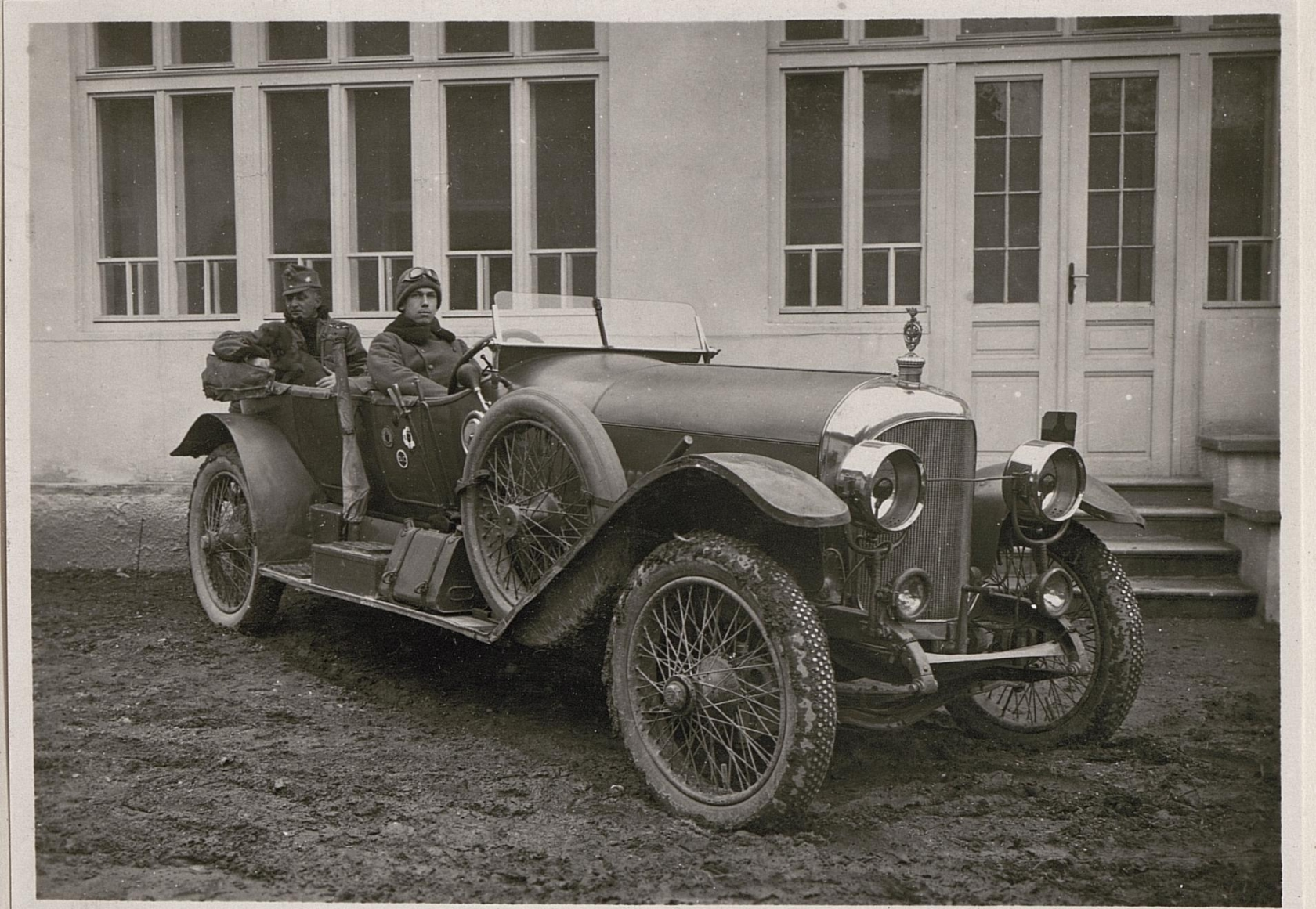
M.-Sziget S.K.H.Erzh.Albrecht mit Rittm.Graf Thun (Kriegspressequartier Alben 1914–1918)

More than 33,000 photographs commissioned by the KPQ are now in the picture archive of the Austrian National Library. Hugo Eywo was one of the photographers employed by the war press headquarters.

=== Film ===
In 1915, Sascha Kolowrat-Krakowsky the founder of Sascha-Film, was appointed director of film at the KPQ, giving film propaganda importance for the first time. Kolowrat-Krakowsky was able to save numerous filmmakers from the trenches by assigning them work in film production. War and propaganda film production was initially under the control of the war archive. These agendas were assigned to the war press office on 1 June 1917.

== Austro-Hungarian propaganda in other countries ==
Austria-Hungary became the early frontrunner in propaganda effectiveness. In propaganda directed at Italy, they emphasised the strength of the Central Powers and how Italy would lose was the war. They also attacked Italy for being in the war for purely-imperialistic reasons, and charged that Italian leaders were sacrificing ordinary soldiers’ blood for their own greedy interests.

Austria-Hungary also spread propaganda against Italy's allies, especially the British. Rivalry between the Italians and the British was exploited, with claims that the British had imperialistic goals for the war and were just using the Italians to achieve them. The Austro-Hungarians argued that the British had already been given opportunities to end the war but were continuing it so that they could gain more territory and influence. British Prime Minister David Lloyd George had not helped by stating that "if necessary Italy's war aims will be abandoned without consideration". The Austro-Hungarians also warned that if the Italians continued to depend for supplies and resources on the British, the Italians' postwar debt would be ruinous, forcing them to pay the British for continuing a war that should have already ended.

== See also ==
- Propaganda in World War I
- Heldenkampf in Schnee und Eis (1917 film)

== Literature ==
- Walter Reichel: „Pressearbeit ist Propagandaarbeit“ - Medienverwaltung 1914-1918: Das Kriegspressequartier (KPQ). Mitteilungen des National Archives of Austria (MÖStA), Sonderband 13, de:Studienverlag, Vienna 2016, ISBN 978-3-7065-5582-1.
- Walter F. Kalina: Österreichisch-ungarische Propaganda im Ersten Weltkrieg. Das k.u.k. Kriegspressequartier 1914-1918, in: Republik Österreich/Bundesministerium für Landesverteidigung und Sport (Ed.): Viribus Unitis. Jahresbericht 2015 des Heeresgeschichtlichen Museums, Vienna 2016, ISBN 978-3-902551-66-5, pp.9–23.
- Walter F. Kalina: Alexander Pock. In: Viribus Unitis, Jahresbericht 2010 des Heeresgeschichtlichen Museums. Vienna 2011, pp. 125–149, ISBN 978-3-902551-19-1.
- Ilse Krumpöck: Anton Faistauers militärische Nichtsnutzigkeit, in: Schriftenreihe zu Anton Faistauer und seiner Zeit. Herausgegeben vom Anton Faistauer Forum, Maishofen, 2007, pp.15–23.
- Adalbert Stifter Verein (Ed.): Musen an die Front! Schriftsteller und Künstler im Dienst der k.u.k. Kriegspropaganda 1914–1918. Exhibition catalogue (2 vols), Munich, 2003.
- Liselotte Popelka / Heeresgeschichtliches Museum (Ed.): Vom „Hurra“ zum Leichenfeld. Gemälde aus der Kriegsbilderausstellung 1914–1918, Exhibition catalogue, Vienna 1981.
- de:Hildegund Schmölzer: Die Propaganda des Kriegspressequartiers im ersten Weltkrieg 1914–1918, Dissertation, Vienna University, 1965.
- Klaus Mayer: Die Organisation des Kriegspressequartiers beim k.u.k. Armeeoberkommando im ersten Weltkrieg 1914–1918. Dissertation, Vienna University 1963.
- Paul Stefan: Die bildende Kunst im Kriegspressequartier, beigelegt dem Katalog Kriegsbilder-Ausstellung des k.u.k. Kriegspressequartiers, Künstlerhaus, Vienna 1918.
