= Artur Berger =

Austrian-Soviet film architect and set designer (1892–1981)

Artur Semyonovich Berger (German: Arthur Berger, Russian: Артур Семёнович Бергер; 27 May 1892 – 11 January 1981) was an Austrian-Soviet film architect and set designer. He was active in Austria between 1920 and 1936, during which time he worked on about 30 feature films.

In 1936 Arthur Berger emigrated to the Soviet Union, where he continued to work on films until the early 1970s.

== Biography ==
Born Arthur Berger in Vienna in 1892 to Jewish parents (Simon Berger, a civil servant, and his wife Pauline, née Beran), Berger was educated at the Graphische Lehr- und Versuchsanstalt and between 1911 and 1915 the Hochschule für angewandte Kunst in Wien, where he was trained in architecture by the highly respected Jugendstil architects Josef Hoffmann and Oskar Strnad.

At first Berger worked with his brother Josef Berger and with Martin Ziegler on the residential building programme of Red Vienna, but in 1920 he changed over to working for Sascha-Film as an architect for scenery and film structures. For the directors Michael Curtiz and Alexander Korda he collaborated on the sets for their epic films Prinz und Bettelknabe (1920), Der junge Medardus (1923), Harun al Raschid (1924), Die Sklavenkönigin (1924) and Salammbô (1924). He often worked with Emil Stepanek and Julius von Borsody. From the mid-1920s however he was involved almost entirely with undistinguished melodramas and light entertainment films. In 1926 he was responsible for the sets on Die Pratermizzi, and in 1927 for the scenery and buildings of the enormously successful Café Elektric directed by Gustav Ucicky. In 1931 he and Siegfried Bernfeld collaborated on the screenplay for Die große Liebe, the first film directed by Otto Preminger.

In 1932, Berger created the sets for Die vom 17er Haus, an election advertising film on behalf of the Social Democrats in the Landtag election, which was made using the Selenophon sound process. The film is set in the year 2032, in which numerous skyscrapers in glass cladding surround the Stephansdom. To avoid this vision of a city not worth living in, the Viennese are urged to act according to the election slogan at the end of the film: "Seid gescheit! Das rote Wien siegt! Wählt sozialdemokratisch!" ("Be clever! Red Vienna is the winner! Vote Social Democrat!"). Along with Rossak's Mr. Pims Europareise this was one of the only two Social Democrat promotional films made by the agency Kiba (Kinobetriebsagentur), and also the last before the party was banned by the Austrian Fascist government.

In 1933, Berger was co-founder of the Lehrinstitut für Tonfilmkunst ("Teaching Institute of Sound Film") in Vienna, where he also taught. He was also a member of the Österreichischer Werkbund ("Austrian Labour Union") and of the Bund österreichischer Künstler otherwise known as the Kunstschau/Sonderbund deutschösterreichischer Künstler ("Union of Austrian Artists"). In 1936, when under economic and political pressure from Nazi Germany the German prohibition against Jews and persons of Jewish descent working in the film industry was also adopted in Austria, Berger immigrated, via Prague and Paris, to Moscow, where he continued his career with Mosfilm as Artur Semyonovich Berger into the 1970s.

He died in Moscow in 1981.

Berger had two sons, Peter (died 2001) and Sascha (living in Moscow) who both worked as architects, in Austria and Russia (Moscow), and also two daughters, Marianne, (died 2009) and Vera, (died in October 2020 at age 102) in Wörgl, Tirol, Austria.

== Filmography ==
- Prinz und Bettelknabe (Austria 1920, dir: Alexander Korda; film architecture with Emil Stepanek)
- The Dead Wedding Guest (1922)
- Gypsy Love (1922)
- The Marquis of Bolibar (Austria 1922, Friedrich Porges; with Julius von Borsody)
- Der junge Medardus (Austria 1923, Michael Curtiz; with Julius von Borsody)
- Nameless (1923)
- Harun al Raschid (Austria 1924, Michael Curtiz; with Julius von Borsody)
- Die Sklavenkönigin (Austria 1924, Michael Curtiz; with Emil Stepanek)
- Salammbô (Austria/France 1924, Pierre Marodon; with Emil Stepanek)
- Das Spielzeug von Paris (Austria/Germany/France 1925, Michael Curtiz)
- The Arsonists of Europe (Austria 1926, Max Neufeld)
- Die Pratermizzi (Austria 1927, Karl Leiter, Gustav Ucicky; with Emil Stepanek)
- Café Elektric (Austria 1927, Gustav Ucicky)
- Tingel Tangel (Austria 1927, Gustav Ucicky)
- Das Weib am Kreuze (Austria 1929, Guido Brignone)
- Der Fall des Generalstabs-Oberst Redl (Germany/Czechoslovakia 1931, Karl Anton; with Emil Stepanek)
- Die große Liebe (Austria, 1931; screenplay with Siegfried Bernfeld)
- Three on a Honeymoon (1932)
- Lumpenkavaliere (Austria/Germany 1932, Carl Boese; with Emil Stepanek)
- Adventures on the Lido (Austria 1933, Richard Oswald)
- Grand Duchess Alexandra (1933)
- Honeymoon Trip (1933)
- Karneval und Liebe (Austria 1934, Carl Lamac)
- Bretter, die die Welt bedeuten (Austria 1935, Kurt Gerron)
- Her Highness Dances the Waltz (1935)
- Heut' ist der schönste Tag in meinem Leben (Austria 1936, Richard Oswald)
- Ошибка инженера Кочина (Oshibka inzheniera Kochina) / Engineer Kochin's Error (USSR 1939, Alexander Macheret)
- Свинарка и пастух (Svinarka i pastukh) / The Swineherd-girl and the Shepherd (USSR 1941, Ivan Pyryev)
- Жди меня (Zhdi menya) / Wait for Me (USSR 1943, Boris Ivanov, Aleksandr Stolper)
- Тайна вечной ночи (Tayna vechnoy nochi) / Mystery of the Eternal Night (USSR 1956, Abram Room, Dmitri Vassilyev)
- Человек в штатском (Chelovek v shtatskom) / The Man in Civilian Clothing (USSR 1973, Vassili Zhuravlyov)

== Awards ==
- 1968: Meritorious Artist of the Russian SFSR
