= Julius von Borsody =

Austrian art director (1892–1960)

Julius von Borsody (8 April 1892 in Vienna – 18 January 1960, also in Vienna) was an Austrian film architect and one of the most employed set designers in the Austrian and German cinemas of the late silent and early sound film periods. His younger brother, Eduard von Borsody, was a film director in Austria and Germany. He is also the great-uncle of German actress Suzanne von Borsody.

== Life ==
Julius von Borsody attended the Munich Art Academy before he started in the film industry in 1917. He began his career with Sascha-Film in Vienna, but up to 1924 also worked with other film production companies. In 1920 he was the set designer for Paul Czinner's highly significant pre-Expressionist work, Inferno. Together with Emil Stepanek and Artur Berger he was also responsible in Vienna, on the epics of Michael Curtiz and Alexander Korda, for the most spectacular sets ever constructed for an Austrian film, in particular the gigantic Temple of Sodom in Sodom und Gomorrha (1922), which because of its sheer size had to be built in the open air, on the Laaer Berg. Other Sascha-Film epics on which he worked were Der junge Medardus (1923) and Harun al-Rashid (1924).

In 1925 Borsody moved to Berlin. There, for films about the history of Prussia, he was able to design more ambitious structures than in Vienna. He worked on Hans Behrendt's Potsdam, das Schicksal einer Residenz (1927) and Phil Jutzi' s Berlin-Alexanderplatz (1931), based on Alfred Döblin's book of the same name. Besides buildings he also created the façades and decorations of other productions with historical and costumed backgrounds, such as Danton (1931) and the Schubert biography Leise flehen meine Lieder (1933).

Shortly before the National Socialists took power in Germany, Borsody returned to Vienna, where for the next few years he worked on a number of films in the Wiener Film genre, light romantic musical comedies, the action of which was generally set in the late imperial period of about 1900: Hohe Schule (1934), Tales from the Vienna Woods (1934), The White Horse Inn (1935) and others.

After the Anschluss (the annexation of Austria to Germany in 1938) Borsody became principal architect of the Nazi-owned Wien-Film, but also occasionally worked on buildings for productions of Bavaria Film in Munich. He was employed on one of the last large-scale productions of the Third Reich - Shiva und die Galgenblume, filmed in early January 1945 with Hans Albers in the Barrandov Studios in Prague – and also on one of the first post-war Austrian films - Der weite Weg (1946).

From that time on, in the declining Austrian film industry, he only worked on unpretentious romances and comedies. His last set designs were for the undistinguished Skandal um Dodo (1958), directed by his brother Eduard.

== Selected filmography ==
The following is a list of selected films on which Julius von Borsody worked as film architect or set designer (director's name in brackets):

- Inferno (Austria 1920, dir. Paul Czinner)
- Lucifer (Austria 1921, dir. Ernest Juhn)
- The Dead Wedding Guest (Austria 1921, dir. Max Neufeld)
- The Marquis of Bolibar (Austria 1922, dir. Friedrich Porges)
- Sodom and Gomorrah (Austria 1922, dir. Michael Curtiz; film architecture together with Emil Stepanek)
- Die Maske der Schuld (Austria 1922, directed himself)
- Young Medardus (Austria 1923, dir. Michael Curtiz)
- Avalanche (Austria 1923, dir. Michael Curtiz)
- Harun al Raschid (Austria 1924, dir. Michael Curtiz)
- The City Without Jews (Austria 1924, dir. Hans Karl Breslauer)
- Countess Maritza (1925)
- A Waltz by Strauss (1925)
- If You Have an Aunt (1925)
- The Girl on a Swing (1926)
- Potsdam (Germany 1927, dir. Hans Behrendt)
- Erotikon (Czechoslovakia 1929, dir. Gustav Machatý)
- Die kleine Veronika (Germany 1929, dir. Robert Land)
- Der Tanz ins Glück (Germany 1930, dir. Max Nosseck; Borsody's first sound film)
- A Girl from the Reeperbahn (1930)
- Rendezvous (1930)
- Love Songs (1930)
- Danton (Germany 1931, dir. Hans Behrendt)
- My Cousin from Warsaw (1931)
- Berlin-Alexanderplatz (Germany 1931, dir. Phil Jutzi)
- A Mad Idea (1932)
- Things Are Getting Better Already (1932)
- Today Is the Day (1933)
- Gently My Songs Entreat (Austria 1933, dir. Willi Forst)
- A Precocious Girl (Austria 1934, dir. Max Neufeld and Richard Eichberg)
- The Secret of Cavelli (Austria 1934, dir. Erich Engel)
- Frasquita (Austria 1934, dir. Carl Lamac)
- Tales from the Vienna Woods (Austria 1934, dir. Georg Jacoby)
- The Gentleman Without a Residence (Austria 1934, dir. E. W. Emo)
- … nur ein Komödiant (Austria 1935, dir. Erich Engel)
- Die Pompadour (Austria 1935, dir. Willy Schmidt-Gentner)
- Circus Saran (1935)
- Eva (1935)
- The World's in Love (1935)
- Heaven on Earth (1935)
- The White Horse Inn (Austria 1935, dir. Carl Lamac)
- Romance (1936)
- Confetti (1936)
- The Fairy Doll (1936)
- Rendezvous in Vienna (1936)
- Opernring / Im Sonnenschein (Austria 1936, dir. Carmine Gallone)
- Ernte / Die Julika (Austria 1936, dir. Géza von Bolváry)
- The Missing Wife (1937)
- Prater / Der Weg des Herzens (Austria 1937, dir. Willy Schmidt-Gentner)
- Unsterblicher Walzer (Germany/Austria 1939, dir. E. W. Emo)
- Ursula Under Suspicion (1939)
- Brüderlein fein (Germany/Austria 1941, dir. Hans Thimig)
- Frauen sind keine Engel (Germany/Austria 1943, dir. Willi Forst)
- Dog Days (1944)
- Shiva und die Galgenblume (Germany 1945, dir. Hans Steinhoff; unfinished film)
- Der weite Weg / Schicksal in Ketten (Austria 1946, dir. Eduard Hoesch)
- Der Herr Kanzleirat (Austria 1948, dir. Hubert Marischka)
- Arlberg Express (Austria 1948, dir. Eduard von Borsody)
- The Singing House (Austria 1948, dir. Franz Antel)
- Maresi (Austria 1948, dir. Hans Thimig)
- Vagabonds (1949)
- Child of the Danube (Austria 1950, dir. Georg Jacoby)
- Vanished Melody (1952)
- If I Only Have Your Love (1953)
- Kaisermanöver (Austria 1954, dir. Franz Antel)
- Her First Date (1955)
- Skandal um Dodo (Austria 1958, dir. Eduard von Borsody; Julius von Borsody's last film)
