= Die große Liebe (1931 film) =

1931 film

The Great Love
- Film poster
- Directed by: Otto Preminger
- Screenplay by: Ernst Redlich; Johannes Riemann
- Based on: The Command to Love, a 1927 play by Fritz Gottwald and Rudolph Lothar
- Produced by: Philipp Hamber
- Starring: Hansi Niese; Attila Hörbiger; Betty Bird
- Cinematography: Hans Theyer
- Edited by: Paul Falkenberg
- Music by: Walter Landauer
- Production company: Allianz-Film
- Distributed by: Süd-Film
- Release date: 31 December 1931
- Running time: 76 minutes
- Country: Austria
- Language: German

The Great Love (German: Die große Liebe) is a 1931 Austrian drama film directed by Otto Preminger, the first of his career. The screenplay by Ernst Redlich and Johannes Riemann is based on a true story, and was adapted from the play The Command to Love (1927) by Fritz Gottwald and Rudolph Lothar.

The film's sets were designed by the art directors Artur Berger and Emil Stepanek.

== Plot ==
In 1927, ten years following the end of World War I, an unnamed Austrian soldier leaves a job in Tbilisi and returns to his Austrian village. He is unemployed and virtually penniless, but is determined to earn a living for himself. Elsewhere in the same town, widowed shopkeeper Frieda pines for her long-lost son Franz, also an Austrian soldier during the War, who disappeared in a prison camp. The unnamed veteran surveys the village from a bridge, from which he sees a young girl fall into the river below. He jumps after and rescues her, refusing any reward but allowing a passing journalist to take his picture. The image of the soldier appears on the front page of the next day's newspaper. Frieda mistakes the veteran for Franz and sets out to find him. After a convoluted chain of events involving several trips to the newspaper's office and the police station (filled with cantankerous bureaucrats), Frieda finds the veteran in a tavern and lovingly takes him home.

"Franz" does not have the heart to tell Frieda about his true identity, so he resolves to use his position in the old woman's household as a method of securing himself in the village. Frieda takes "Franz" to a party hosted by Mr. Huber, a wealthy local entrepreneur. Huber has arranged the party (and the elaborate musical play at its center) as a method of compelling his daughter Anny into marriage with middle-aged lawyer Steinlechner; at the climax of the play, in which Anny is starring, Steinlechner will propose. Anny does not love Steinlechner, however, and looks for a way out of her arranged marriage. Frieda and "Franz" arrive in the middle of the party and are promptly escorted out, as Huber had not actually invited Frieda. Anny uses the chaos to escape, and the play ends once Huber realizes that his daughter is missing. Outside, Anny and "Franz" bond, and he tells her about the scheme.

Frieda wants to provide "Franz" with a stable source of income, so she resolves to buy him a taxi with her life savings. She does not have the money, so she forges her savings-book and sends "Franz" to the dealership to fraudulently use the book as collateral in a mortgage arrangement. Not knowing about the forgery, "Franz" buys the taxi and speeds past a policeman on his way to pick up Anny (who has run away from her parents). "Franz" is arrested and charged with speeding; Frieda rushes to the police station and confesses to the savings-book scheme. The head magistrate, frazzled by the stress of dealing with Frieda, agrees to let both mother and "son" off with minor punishments. The film ends as "Franz," Anny, Frieda, and one of Frieda's friends get in the car. "Franz" stresses to Anny the importance of maintaining his secret, while, in the back seat, Frieda confesses to her friend that she had known all along that the veteran was not her son, and she had taken him in out of mere kindness.

== Cast ==
- Hansi Niese as Frieda, die Mutter
- Attila Hörbiger as Franz
- Betty Bird as Anny Huber, Tochter
- Hugo Thimig as Polizeikommissar
- Ferdinand Mayerhofer as Huber
- Maria Waldner as Amalia, seine Frau
- Hans Olden as Dr. Theobald Steinlechner
- Adrienne Gessner as Rosa
- Franz Engel as Fritz Eckstein, Reporter
- Georg Dénes as Fery
- Carl Goetz as Ein Strolch
- Karl Kneidinger

== Production ==
Shortly after directing the legal melodrama Voruntersuchung (Preliminary Inquiry) for Max Reinhardt's Theater in der Josefstadt, Otto Preminger was approached by industrialist Heinrich Haas, who had an interest in the burgeoning Austrian film industry and thought Preminger might be interested in directing for the screen. Although Preminger knew nothing about filmmaking and had little passion for the medium, he decided to accept the assignment to keep busy during the summer, when the theater was closed. He cast Attila Hörbiger from the Josefstadt company and Viennese musical comedy star Hansi Niese in the lead roles and managed to elicit from them an acting style better suited to the screen than stage. The film was produced by Philipp Hamber, at the time owner of Allianz Film GmbH. Although the film, which opened at the Emperor Theater in Vienna on 21 December 1931, was a critical and commercial success, in later years Preminger described it as a juvenile folly he preferred to forget.
