= Die Pratermizzi =

1926 film

- Scene from the film
- Directed by: Gustav Ucicky
- Written by: Walter Reisch
- Produced by: Alexander Kolowrat
- Starring: Anny Ondra; Igo Sym; Nita Naldi
- Cinematography: Gustav Ucicky; Eduard von Borsody
- Distributed by: Sascha-Film
- Release date: January 1927
- Running time: 50 minutes
- Country: Austria
- Language: German

Die Pratermizzi (literally, "Mizzi of the Prater") is an Austrian silent drama film directed by Gustav Ucicky in 1926, released in January 1927, and starring Anny Ondra, Igo Sym and Nita Naldi. The film was long believed lost until its rediscovery in 2005. The film's art direction was by Artur Berger and Emil Stepanek. This was the last major film role of Nita Naldi, whose career did not survive the advent of the talkies.

== Plot ==
Marie, a cashier in the tunnel of love Zum Walfisch on the Prater in Vienna, and Baron Christian von B. fall in love, but their relationship is disrupted by the capricious involvement of the dancer Valette, who always wears a mask. Christian eventually follows Valette to Paris. When he tears the golden mask from her face he is shocked to discover that she is disfigured by a disease. He returns to Vienna with the intention of putting an end to his life, but at the last minute Marie is able to save him.

The ride through the tunnel of love is associated in this film with the journey into one's own self.

== Cast ==
- Igo Sym as Freiherr Christian von B.
- Anny Ondra as Marie
- Nita Naldi as Valette, the dancer with the mask
- Hedy Pfundmayr as the dancer's double
- Carl Götz as Herr von Z.
- Ferdinand Leopoldi as Adam Lorenz Stingl, owner of the tunnel of love
- Hugo Thimig as Matthias Veitschberger

== History of the film ==
In 2005 a print of the Pratermizzi on a base of the inflammable cellulose nitrate was discovered in the archives of the Centre national de la cinématographie. It was successfully copied and restored in time to be shown at the opening of Prater Film Festival the same year.

Excerpts from the film were published by the Filmarchiv Austria on the DVD "Der Wiener Prater im Film" in July 2005.

== Sources and external links ==
- Pratermizzi at IMDb
- Österreichisches Filmarchiv (in German)
- Stummfilm.at (in German)
