= Wilhelm John =

Austrian general, museum director and military historian (1877–1934)

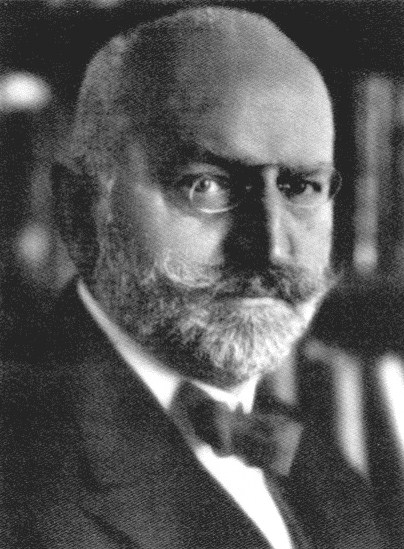
Wilhelm John

Wilhelm John (1 May 1877 – 19 March 1934) was an Austrian historian and army general. From 1909 until his death he was director of the Museum of Military History, Vienna.

== Life ==
Born in Olomouc, Moravia, he began his military career in 1898 as a cadet in the 3rd Division Artillery Regiment of the Austro-Hungarian Army, simultaneously studying history in the University of Vienna and gaining a doctorate of philosophy in 1901. During his studies he joined Vienna's German Student Association. From 1899 to 1901 he completed a training course at the Institut für Österreichische Geschichtsforschung, before going on a study trip to the Austrian Historical Institute in Rome. In 1902 he was promoted to Lieutenant in the army reserves and the following year took a job alongside Wilhelm Erben as a 'scientific assistant' at the Royal and Imperial Army Museum (now the Army Historical Museum). After Erben left for the University of Innsbruck John became a curator and then from 1909 director of the Army Museum. In this role John was the first in that post to bear the official title of 'Director', simultaneously holding the rank of an artillery-engineer 'Hauptmann' (captain), since the Museum was still affiliated with the technical artillery.

His first great success was the highly-acclaimed Archduke Charles exhibition marking the centenary of the Battle of Aspern-Essling in the new wing of the Museum for Art and Industry (now the Museum of Applied Arts). For organising it Franz Joseph I awarded him the Knight's Cross of the Order of Franz-Joseph. In 1913 he was also acclaimed for publishing the Erzherzog-Carl-Werk. In 1915 he was promoted to Oberst and awarded the Officer's Cross with War Decoration of the Order of Franz-Joseph.

From the very start of the First World War he headed the art group in the War Press Headquarters. In this double role as museum director and head of the art group, he created a large collection of paintings by war artists such as Oskar Laske, Ferdinand Andri, Alexander Pock and Albin Egger-Lienz, and the Museum's rise more generally between 1909 and 1934 is generally associated with his name. He later organised the Museum's "collecting service" and a permanent display of the First World War works in a devoted art gallery, which opened in 1923. The dual role also led him to be a kind of guardian-angel for artists who later became famous such as Egon Schiele and Anton Faistauer, saving them from being sent to the front by providing them with at least temporary employment at the Army Museum.

In 1921, John was promoted to General and in 1929 he was made a 'Hofrat' or privy counsellor. Towards the end of his life his museum work was severely limited by a serious heart condition, which eventually led to heart failure in Vienna whilst he was still working. He was buried in Vienna Central Cemetery and left behind a widow and a daughter.

== Honours before 1933 ==
- Gallipoli Star (Ottoman Empire)
- Cross of Military Merit (Spain), 3rd Class
- Marian Cross of the Teutonic Order (Germany)
- Anniversary Commemorative Medal of the Princedom of Liechtenstein
- Order of Military Merit (Bulgaria), 3rd Class
- Officer of the Albert Order (Saxony)
- Order of the Red Eagle (Prussia), 3rd Class
- Military Merit Order (Bavaria), 4th Class with Crown
- Order of Saint Michael (Bavaria), 3rd Class
- Military Anniversary Cross 1908
- 1898 Jubilee Medal
- Decoration for Services to the Red Cross, Officer's Medal of Honour, War Decoration
- Grand Silver Decoration of Honour for Services to the Republic of Austria

== Selected works ==
- Wilhelm John, Wilhelm Erben: Katalog des k.u.k. Heeresmuseums, Vienna 1903
