= The Expulsion =

The Expulsion may refer to:

- The Expulsion (film), a 1923 silent German drama film
- Expulsion of the Acadians, the forced removal by the British of the Acadian people
- Expulsion of Poles by Germany, a prolonged anti-Polish campaign of ethnic cleansing
- Expulsion of Poles by Nazi Germany, the forced resettlement of over 1.7 million ethnic Poles from all territories of occupied Poland
- Flight and expulsion of Germans during and after World War II, the forced migration of millions of Reichsdeutsche from various European states and territories

== See also ==
- Indian removal
