= If I Only Have Your Love =

1953 film

- Directed by: Eduard von Borsody
- Written by: Hans Fritz Köllner; August Rieger; Philipp von Zeska
- Produced by: Ernest Müller
- Starring: Johannes Heesters; Gretl Schörg; Margit Saad
- Cinematography: Bruno Mondi
- Edited by: Herma Sandtner
- Music by: Rudolf Kattnigg
- Production company: Schönbrunn-Film
- Distributed by: Sascha Filmverleih
- Release date: 15 December 1953
- Running time: 86 minutes
- Country: Austria
- Language: German

If I Only Have Your Love (German: Hab' ich nur deine Liebe) is a 1953 Austrian musical drama film directed by Eduard von Borsody and starring Johannes Heesters, Gretl Schörg and Margit Saad. It was shot in Agfacolor at the Sievering Studios in Vienna. The film's sets were designed by the art directors Hans Rouc and Julius von Borsody. It was distributed by Herzog Film in the West German market.

== Synopsis ==
Struggling composer Franz von Suppé admires the works of Jacques Offenbach and wants to emulate him. However, the owner of the theatre where he works is uninterested in his talents and only wants to stage Offenbach. With the encouragement and support of the singer Sophie Strasser, he manages to turn out several hit operettas. He marries her, but their relationship is threatened by the Countess Coralie Barany who turns his head.

== Cast ==
- Johannes Heesters as Franz von Suppé
- Gretl Schörg as Sophie Strasser
- Walter Müller as Toni
- Margit Saad as Komtesse Coralie Barany
- Friedel Hardt as Anny
- Theodor Danegger as Gerichtsvollzieher Nigerl
- Helmut Qualtinger as Direktor Pokorny
- Peter Gerhard as Impresario Spalandrini
- Pepi Glöckner-Kramer as Berta, Köchin
- Erik Frey as Lobheimer
- Egon von Jordan as Jacques Offenbach
- Viktor Braun as Wirt

== Bibliography ==
- Fritsche, Maria. Homemade Men in Postwar Austrian Cinema: Nationhood, Genre and Masculinity. Berghahn Books, 2013.
- Fryer, Paul (ed.) The Composer on Screen: Essays on Classical Music Biopics. McFarland, 2018.
