= Heldenkampf in Schnee und Eis =

1917 Austro-Hungarian film

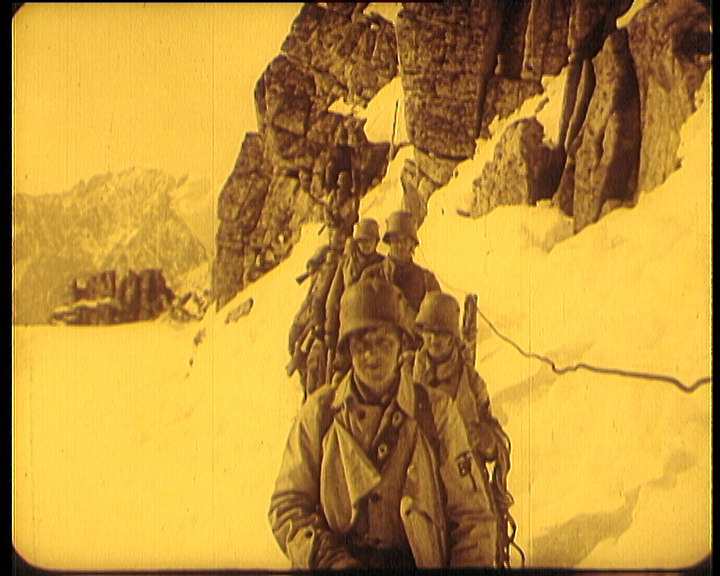
Still from Heldenkampf in Schnee und Eis

Heldenkampf in Schnee und Eis (Heroes' Fight in Snow and Ice) is a 1917 Austro-Hungarian propaganda newsreel film made by Sascha-Film for the Imperial and Royal War Press Headquarters. The film is hand-coloured and presented in two sections, with a total running time of 49 minutes 50 seconds.

== Background ==
The creator of Heldenkampf in Schnee und Eis remains unknown, but it may have been the work of the cameraman and later director Gustav Ucicky. At that time, film was still a very new form of propaganda. Ein Heldenkampf in Schnee und Eis consists of exterior shots on the Alpine front in Trentino-Alto Adige/Südtirol, where battles were being fought in the mountains at 2,000 to 3,000 meters. These offered an opportunity for each side to portray its soldiers as heroes, the fight in snow and ice demonstrating strength and superiority over the enemy and allowing each side to emphasise the effectiveness of its own weapons and warfare. A silent film, it had title cards between shots as was normal, but was presented without musical accompaniment in the cinema, which was unusual.

== Action ==
=== Scenes in section one ===
1. Early morning on the glacier, a patrol in the ice
2. Movement observed in the enemy lines. A patrol marches out
3. Across the walls of snow
4. Reconnaissance patrols are also at work in the other sections of the front
5. Climbing a 3,500m high Firn overlooking the enemy positions
6. Any advances by the enemy must be thwarted. The section commander takes the cable car to the forward bases
7. Express train speed through a station of the glacier railway
8. The troops, exhausted after several months of service, are replaced by fresh units
9. Laborious ascent after long marches
10. The detached troops descend from the glacier to the rest and recovery stations
11. Artillery is prepared. A mountain cannon is transported over the steep glacier
12. The gun is mounted
13. Enemy columns in sight. Alarm at the highest heavy artillery on our Alpine front. # # The war in the glacier. Ice crevices and crevices through which the enemy can advance are occupied and expanded by our troops
14. High alpine equipment is carried on the cableway.
15. Before attacking the enemy base, a mountain guide patrol clears the difficult terrain
16. Arctic fortresses: Austro-Hungarian military camps in mountain heights that humans have so far not been able to colonize.

=== Scenes in section two ===
1. Attack on the enemy base 'Height 3274'
2. The day before the attack. A trench in our glacier positions raked by enemy fire
3. With the infantry observer: View of the enemy Base 'Höhe 3274'
4. Early in the morning of the day of the attack: The troops lying in reserve are alerted
5. A rapid firing gun is brought forward to an improvised firing position
6. The attackers approach Their positions
7. The gun is aligned
8. The section commander, who directs the attack
9. The order to fire. The brief but devastating artillery preparation for the attack begins.
10. Height 3274 under fire. The attack force advances
11. The attack force heads towards the enemy position
12. At attacking distance
13. To make it impossible for the enemy reserves to come forward, the target zone of artillery fire is moved back
14. Attack! Under fire from the surviving defenders, the attackers break into the enemy base over difficult rocks
15. The height has been taken. The section commander receives the report
16. The wounded and prisoners are transported away
17. On the conquered ridge: View of the firns and rocks of the main enemy positions
18. Report on the mountain battle of Austrian soldiers on the southern front against Italy in the First World War

The soldiers' thirst for action can be seen from the last text overlay. An enemy base has only just been stormed, and you can already look into the distance at the firns and peaks, where the main enemy positions are. Like the beginning of the film, the last shot is a mountain shot.

== Criticism ==
The distinction between fiction and documentary film was still unclear at the time the film was made, and it was common to take multiple images and cut them in quick succession. The film departed from the normal rules of the war press headquarters. It obviously shows the exhausted, unmotivated faces of the fighters, the endless expanses of the mountains and impassible snow. It did not seek to contribute to strengthening the nation's self-confidence as an ordinary propaganda film might, but showed the limits of strength and endurance. The film included scenes apparently shot from behind both Austrian and Italian lines, including some identifiable as having been shown before, so did not consist of entirely new and documentary camerawork. It included some scenes previously shown in Beim Johannesfall in den Radstätter Tauern (1917) made by the same studio.
