= Emil Stepanek =

Austrian set designer and architect (1895–1945)

Emil Stepanek (21 February 1895 – 12 April 1945) was an Austrian set designer and film architect.

== Biography ==
Stepanek was born in Vienna, the son of a carpenter, and received a training in stage set construction, in which he worked for several years. Between 1916 and 1918 he had to perform military service. After the end of World War I he returned to his work in theatres.

In 1919 he had his first contact with the film industry. In the years that followed he often worked with the renowned film architects Julius von Borsody, Artur Berger and Alexander Ferenczy, particularly on the epic films of Sascha-Film directed by Alexander Korda and Michael Curtiz: Prinz und Bettelknabe (1920), Sodom und Gomorrha (1922), Die Sklavenkönigin (1924) and Salammbô (1924).

Stepanek remained in film set construction up to 1936, after which he worked in the area of executive film production. In 1944 he became director of the whole of set construction in the Rosenhügel Film Studios. On 12 April 1945, one day before the end of hostilities in World War II in Vienna, he lost his life in unexplained circumstances.

== Selected filmography ==
- Prinz und Bettelknabe (Austria 1920, dir: Alexander Korda; film architecture with Artur Berger)
- Eine versunkene Welt / Die Tragödie eines verschollenen Fürstensohnes (Austria 1922, dir: Alexander Korda)
- Sodom und Gomorrha (Austria 1922, dir: Michael Curtiz; with Julius von Borsody)
- Die Sklavenkönigin (Austria 1924, dir: Michael Curtiz; with Artur Berger)
- Salammbô (Austria/France 1924, dir: Pierre Marodon; with Artur Berger)
- Champagner (Germany/UK/Austria 1928, dir: Géza von Bolváry; with Artur Berger)
- The White Sonata (1928)
- Father Radetzky (1929)
- Devotion (1929)
- The Deed of Andreas Harmer (1930)
- Money on the Street (Austria 1930, dir: Georg Jacoby; with Hans Jacoby)
- Die vom 17er Haus (Austria 1932, dir: Artur Berger; with Artur Berger)
- Scampolo, ein Kind der Straße (Germany 1932, dir: Hans Steinhoff)
- Lumpenkavaliere (Austria 1932, dir: Carl Boese; with Artur Berger)
- Madame Wants No Children (Germany 1933, dir: Hans Steinhoff)
- Maskerade (Austria 1934, dir: Willi Forst; with Oskar Strnad)
- Tales from the Vienna Woods (Austria 1934, dir: Georg Jacoby)
- Episode (Austria 1935, dir: Walter Reisch)
- The Emperor's Candlesticks (Austria 1936, dir: Karl Hartl; with Kurt Herlth, Werner Schlichting)
- Court Theatre (Austria 1936, dir: Willi Forst; with Kurt Herlth, Werner Schlichting)
- Hannerl and Her Lovers (1936)

== Sources and external links ==
- Emil Stepanek at IMDb
- Filmportal.de Emil Stepanek: filmography (in German)
