= Young Medardus =

1923 film

- Directed by: Michael Curtiz
- Written by: Arthur Schnitzler (play); Ladislaus Vajda
- Produced by: Arnold Pressburger
- Starring: Victor Varconi; Egon von Jordan; Agnes Esterhazy
- Cinematography: Gustav Ucicky; Eduard von Borsody
- Production company: Sascha-Film
- Release date: 5 October 1923
- Running time: 136 minutes
- Country: Austria
- Languages: Silent; German intertitles

Young Medardus (German: Der junge Medardus) is a 1923 Austrian silent historical drama film directed by Michael Curtiz and starring Victor Varconi, Egon von Jordan and Agnes Esterhazy. Based on a play with the same name by Arthur Schnitzler, it is set during the 1809 French occupation of Vienna during the Napoleonic Wars.

It was shot at the Schönbrunn Studios in Vienna and on location in the city. The film's sets were designed by the art directors Artur Berger and Julius von Borsody.

== Cast ==
- Victor Varconi as Medardus Klähr
- Egon von Jordan as Etzel
- Agnes Esterhazy as Helene
- Gyula Szőreghy as Eschenbacher
- Karel Lamač as Franz
- Franz Glawatsch as Berger
- Mari Hegyesi as Mrs. Klähr
- Anny Hornik as Agathe
- Josef König as Wachshuber
- Ferdinand Onno as Marquis de Valois
- Ludwig Rethey as Duke of Valois
- Mary Stone as Anna
- Mihail Xantho as Napoleon

== See also ==
- Michael Curtiz filmography

== Bibliography ==
- Von Dassanowsky, Robert. Austrian Cinema: A History. McFarland, 2005.
