= Adam and Eve (1923 film) =

1923 film

- Directed by: Friedrich Porges; Reinhold Schünzel
- Written by: Friedrich Porges
- Starring: Werner Krauss; Dagny Servaes; Rudolf Forster
- Cinematography: Reimar Kuntze; Guido Seeber
- Production company: Gespor-Film
- Release date: 23 May 1923
- Running time: 90 minutes
- Country: Germany
- Languages: Silent; German intertitles

Adam and Eve (German: Adam und Eva) is a 1923 German silent drama film directed by Friedrich Porges and Reinhold Schünzel and starring Werner Krauss, Dagny Servaes and Rudolf Forster.

== Cast ==
- Werner Krauss
- Dagny Servaes
- Rudolf Forster
- Ruth Weyher
- Hermann Picha
- Loni Pyrmont

== Bibliography ==
- Bock, Hans-Michael; Bergfelder, Tim, eds. (2009). The Concise Cinegraph: Encyclopaedia of German Cinema. Berghahn Books. ISBN 978-1-57181-655-9.
