= Bogdan Stimoff =

1916 silent drama film

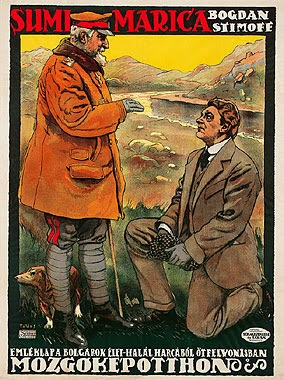
- Film poster
- Directed by: Georg Jacoby
- Written by: Alfred Deutsch-German
- Produced by: Paul Davidson
- Starring: Georg Reimers; Lotte Medelsky; Carl Goetz
- Cinematography: Axel Graatkjær
- Production companies: PAGU; Österreichisch-ungarische Kino-Industrie
- Distributed by: PAGU
- Release date: 7 September 1916
- Running time: 110 minutes
- Countries: Austria; Bulgaria; Germany
- Languages: Silent; German intertitles

Bogdan Stimoff is a 1916 silent drama film directed by Georg Jacoby and starring Georg Reimers, Lotte Medelsky, and Carl Goetz. It was made as a co-production between Bulgaria, Germany and the Austrian Empire, the allied Central Powers of the First World War.

Location shooting took place around the Bulgarian capital Sofia.

== Cast ==
- Georg Reimers as Bogdan Stimov
- Lotte Medelsky as Ana
- Carl Goetz as Selskiyat idiot
- Alfred Valters
- Marietta Pikaver
- Hans Lackner
- Fritz Wrede
- Josef Rehberger
- Viktor Franz
- Tsar Ferdinand I of Bulgaria as himself
- Tsaritsa Eleonore of Bulgaria as herself
