= From Nine to Nine =

1918 novel by Leo Perutz

- First edition (German) published by Albert Langen
- Author: Leo Perutz
- Original title: Zwischen neun und neun
- Translator: Lily Lore; Edward Larkin and Thomas Ahrens
- Cover artist: Th. Th. Heine
- Language: German
- Genre: Novel
- Publisher: Various newspapers (Original serial); The Viking Press; Ariadne Press (Eng. lang. book)
- Publication date: 1918
- Publication place: Austria
- English publication date: 1926; 2009
- Media type: Print (Hardback & Paperback)
- Pages: 224 pp (hardcover edition)
- ISBN: 978-1-57241-168-5

From Nine to Nine or Between Nine and Nine (German title: Zwischen neun und neun; original title: Freiheit) is a novel by Leo Perutz first published in 1918. It is about a turbulent day in the life of an impoverished student in Imperial Vienna. The commission of a desperate crime at the beginning of the novel triggers a chain reaction during which the protagonist is thrown into a series of grotesque situations while all around him people carry on with their normal lives without noticing anything out of the ordinary.

Originally serialized in various newspapers in Prague, Vienna, and Berlin, From Nine to Nine became a very popular book and was translated into eight languages during the 1920s. In 1922 Metro-Goldwyn-Mayer bought the film rights, but the film was never made.

== Plot summary ==
Stanislaus Demba, an honest, well-intentioned student with little money at his disposal, is desperately in love with Sonja Hartmann, an office girl easily impressed by young men with money—a superficial young woman who, by common consent, is not worthy of his love and adoration. When Demba learns that Sonja is about to go on a holiday with another man, he tries to sell some valuable old library tomes which he has borrowed but never returned to a shady antiques dealer so that he can offer Sonja a more expensive trip. The prospective buyer of the books, however, calls the police, and Demba is arrested. While he is being handcuffed Demba jumps out of an attic window and makes his escape.

It is nine o'clock in the morning, and Demba embarks on his odyssey by furtively wandering around the streets of Vienna while hiding his handcuffed hands under his overcoat. His two immediate aims now are (a) to get rid of his handcuffs by some means or other without being caught by the police and (b) to raise the money necessary for a trip to, say, Venice, Italy. People who realize that he is unwilling to show his hands either believe he is some kind of freak with a deformity or a dangerous criminal carrying a pistol. Throughout the first part of the novel, Demba repeatedly refers to "his hands being tied", but everyone—including the majority of readers—assumes that he is speaking metaphorically. The novel has a morbid ending.

== Translations ==
- From Nine to Nine - Translated by Lily Lore. 1926 The Viking Press
- Between Nine and Nine - ISBN 978-1-57241-168-5

Translated by Edward Larkin and Thomas Ahrens. 2009 Ariadne Press

== Read on ==
- Ambrose Bierce: "An Occurrence at Owl Creek Bridge" (short story, 1891)
- William Golding: Pincher Martin (novel, 1956)
