= Ferdinand Leopoldi =

Austrian actor and pianist (1886–1944)

Ferdinand Leopoldi, real name Ferdinand Israel Kohn (20 August 1886 – 20 December 1944) was an Austrian pianist, hit composer and cabaret manager.

== Life ==
Born in Vienna, Leopoldi was the eldest son of the musician Leopold Kohn (the official change of surname to Leopoldi took place in 1911). He taught him and his brother Hermann how to play the piano. He also tried to secure musical engagements for the two; already at the age of six Ferdinand appeared as a pianist. Like his brother, he spent the First World War with the 4th Infantry Regiment "Hoch- und Deutschmeister". Afterwards, both often had common appearances in the Ronacher and other establishments and bars. It was in this period that Leopoldi's first hit came into being. In 1918 he was one of the co-founders of the International Artist Organization.

As solo pianist in Viennese cafés and bars he was advertised as Ferdinand Leopoldi, his brother Hermann as Leopoldi.

In 1922, together with the lecturer Fritz Wiesenthal (who died 31 December 1936 in a sanatorium located in Mauer, Vienna aged 53), Hermann and Ferdinand Leopoldi opened the cabaret "Leopoldi-Wiesenthal" (often abbreviated "L.W."), in the Rothgasse 5 in the first district of Vienna. The restaurant soon became known far beyond the regional borders. In addition to Leopoldi-Wiesenthal, more or less regularly acts were Charlotte Waldow, Franzi Ressel, Armin Berg, Hans Moser, Szöke Szakall, Max Hansen, Fritz Grünbaum, Karl Valentin or Raoul Aslan and Otto Tressler. In 1925, however, they had to close the restaurant for financial reasons, since mone of the managers had ever learnt how to do business. They then made guest appearances in Berlin and Switzerland and undertook wider-ranging tours.

Towards the end of the 1920s, the Leopoldi brothers gradually went their separate ways. Hermann had more and more solo appearances, while Ferdinand took part in the 1926 movie Die Pratermizzi and was mainly active as bar pianist before having numerous appearances with Robert Rakowianu (1886-1938) and Grete von Király on the radio in the 1930s.

After the Anschluss of Austria, his brother Hermann was deported to the Dachau Concentration Camp in 1938 but was able to emigrate to the US in 1939. Leopoldi, who was married to an Aryan, stayed in Vienna and lived secretly during the Austria under National Socialism period in an apartment in the Viennese Bellariastraße. However, he was discovered there in 1943 and taken to an interrogation by the Gestapo, the consequences of which killed him in the Rothschild Hospital.

== Works ==
- Das Mädel ist nicht ohne. Lyrics by Wilhelm Sterk. Vienna 1920.
- Op. 33. Cyrano. Valse macabre. Klavier. Wiener Boheme-Verlag, Vienna 1920, OBV.
- Immer nur Du!. Slow-Fox. Lyrics by Peter Herz. Music with Ferry Kowarik. Figaro-Verlag, Wien/Berlin 1927, OBV.
- Rax-Marsch. Music with Robert Rakowianu.
- Ronald Leopoldi (editor): Leopoldiana. Gesammelte Werke von Hermann Leopoldi und elf Lieder von Ferdinand Leopoldi. Doblinger, Vienna 2011, ISBN 978-3-902667-23-6.

== Filmography ==
- 1927: Die Pratermizzi

== Bibliography ==
- Felix Czeike (editor): Historisches Lexikon Wien. Volume 4, Kremayr & Scheriau, Vienna 1995, ISBN 3-218-00546-9, p. 32
- Monika Kornberger: Leopoldi (actually Kohn), Familie. In Oesterreichisches Musiklexikon. Inline edition, Vienna 2002. ISBN 3-7001-3077-5; Druckausgabe: volume 3, Austrian Academy of Sciences edition, Vienna 2004, ISBN 3-7001-3045-7.
- Josef Koller: Das Wiener Volkssängertum in alter und neuer Zeit. Nacherzähltes und Selbsterlebtes. Gerlach & Wiedling, Vienna 1931, p. 161.
- Peter Herz: Gestern war ein schöner Tag. Liebeserklärung eines Librettisten an die Vergangenheit. Österreichischer Bundesverlag, Wien 1985, ISBN 3-215-05663-1, p. 61.
- Hans Weiss, Ronald Leopoldi (editors): Hermann Leopoldi und Helly Möslein. "In einem kleinen Café in Hernals …". Eine Bildbiographie (Edition Trend S) Orac, Vienna 1992, ISBN 3-7015-1001-6.
