= Wien im Kriege =

Vienna At War
- Directed by: Fritz Freisler, Heinz Hanus
- Written by: Fritz Freisler, Edmund Porges
- Produced by: Alexander Kolowrat, Oskar Messter
- Starring: Georg Kundert, Friedl Bringolf, Eva Karina, Erich Kober, Paul Olmühl, Therese Frank
- Production company: Sascha-Film
- Release date: 1916
- Country: Austria-Hungary
- Languages: Silent; German intertitles

Wien im Kriege (English: Vienna At War) is a 1916 Austrian silent comedy film directed by Fritz Freisler and Heinz Hanus.

== Plot ==
A butcher (Franz) and his womanizing son (Ferdl) join the army. The son is engaged to 3 different women (Franzi, Resl, & Poldi) who don't know about each other. While serving they're both promoted to officer status. On leave in Vienna on May Day, Franz and Ferdl are sitting at an outdoor cafe with another officer when two of the women show up at the same time and learn about each other. The women get upset and start quarreling, ending up in a fight that Ferdl gets caught in the middle of. This ends when Franz walks away arm-in-arm with one of them, Ferdl jumps onto a passing tram that the third woman just happens to be riding, and the other woman at the cafe engages with the third officer.
