= Hermann Leopoldi =

Austrian composer and cabaret star (1888–1959)

Hermann Leopoldi gibt ein Konzert bei den Trabern in der Krieau by Carl Franz Bauer

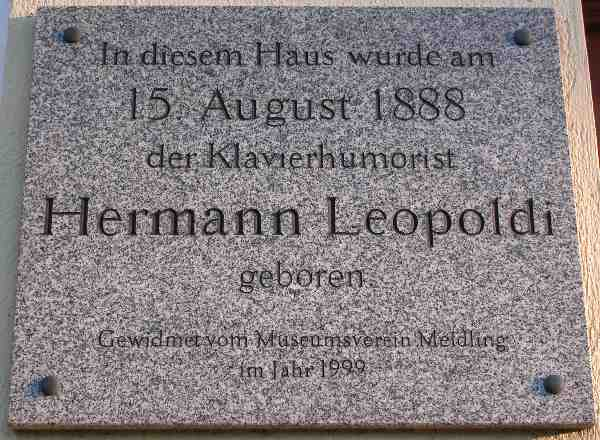
Hermann Leopoldi memorial (Schönbrunner Straße 219, Meidling, Vienna)

Hermann Leopoldi (born Hersch Kohn; 15 August 1888 – 28 June 1959) was an Austrian composer and cabaret star who survived Dachau and Buchenwald. Einzi Stolz, wife of composer Robert Stolz, remembered him thus:

"Leopoldi was for us all some sort of creature from a different planet. Through salvation bordering on a miracle he had survived the horrors of concentration camps Buchenwald and Dachau. He maintained his belief in the good in humanity and remained an optimist, who gave courage and confidence to many in times of difficulty."

== Life ==
Hermann Leopoldi was born in Vienna and was taught the piano by his father, the musician Leopold Leopoldi (born Leopold Kohn; the family officially changed its name to Leopoldi in 1911), who also sought employment for him: Leopoldi's first jobs were as an accompanist and bar pianist. He married Eugenie Kraus 1911 and served in the First World War, establishing himself as a forces entertainer. His son Norbert was born in 1912 and his daughter Gertrude was born in 1915. His first major appearance was in the Viennese cabaret Ronacher in 1916. By 1922 he and his brother were well enough known to open their own cabaret, Kabarett Leopoldi-Wiesenthal, which developed a reputation as a centre for such later celebrated performers as Hans Moser, Szöke Szakall, Max Hansen, Fritz Grünbaum, Karl Valentin, Raoul Aslan and Otto Tressler. After its closure in 1925 Leopoldi toured with his first singing partner Betja Milskaja appearing in Berlin, Paris, Budapest, Bukarest, Prague and Switzerland as well as Vienna.

Leopoldi wrote the music for some of the most famous ‘’Wienerlieder’’ (a musical genre, translated roughly as "songs about Vienna"), setting words by Peter Herz and Fritz Löhner-Beda among others to music. Following the take-over of the Nazis in Austria on 11 March 1938 – the so-called Anschluss – Leopoldi, his wife, son and daughter attempted to flee from Vienna by train but the border to Czechoslovakia had already been closed. When the train returned to Vienna, the SS were waiting to sort passengers into two groups; Non-Jewish and Jewish. While Leopoldi waited with the other Jewish passengers, a train conductor who was a huge fan, snuck Leopoldi and his family out a side door. On 26 April 1938 Leopoldi, by then already scheduled to travel to appear in the United States, was arrested and transported first to Dachau and then Buchenwald.

In Buchenwald he performed his own songs for other prisoners, and most famously, in response to a contest initiated by the camp commander, composed the Buchenwaldlied (Buchenwald song) to words by Löhner-Beda. Entered by a non-Jewish Kapo, the song was selected as the winner, although the promised prize was never distributed. Despite its optimistic mood and text, the song was popular with the camp personnel as well as with the prisoners. Years later Leopoldi remembered that the song

"pleased the camp commander intensely; in his stupidity he did not see how revolutionary the song actually was. From this day on we had to sing the march morning, noon and night …. Rödl [the camp commander] liked to dance to the melody, while the camp music played on one side, and on the other side people were being whipped … Through our work colony the song was brought to surrounding villages, and soon it was known throughout the land."

Meanwhile, his wife had managed to travel to the US, from where she “bought” Leopoldi's freedom with a large bribe. He travelled to New York City where he was greeted by reporters: photographs of him kissing American soil on arrival went around the world. Rare among cabaret artist émigrés, Leopoldi quickly established a successful career in New York, performing both German and English language versions of his ‘Wiener Lieder’, and even running a musical café called Viennese Lantern. This café, popular with Americans but especially catering to the community of artists who had fled the Nazi regime, was according to Einzi Stolz (wife of the Austrian composer Robert Stolz) ‘’an oasis of authentic Vienna in the middle of New York, where for a few hours you could dream of a Vienna that was so far away and unattainable, yet lived on in your heart”.

Leopoldi and his new partner Helly Möslein returned to Vienna in 1947, where he resumed the career cut short in 1938, performing and touring all over post-war Germany, Austria and Switzerland. His son Ronald was born 1955. In a powerful sign of the transformative impact he had on the reconstruction of Austria, in 1958 Leopoldi was awarded the Golden Medal of Decoration of Honour for Services to the Republic of Austria. He died in Vienna of a heart attack in June 1959, at the age of 70.

In June 1984 a park was named in his honour in Meidling, a Viennese district.

== Works ==
He wrote hundreds of songs including:

- I Am a Quiet Drinker
- A Little Café Down the Street (In einem kleinen Café in Hernals, lyrics: Peter Herz)
- Am besten hat's ein Fixangestellter (lyrics: Peter Herz)
- Der Krankenkassenpatient (lyrics: Hanns Haller)
- Schnucki, ach Schnucki (lyrics: Rudolf Skutajan)
- A guater Tropfen, so dreimal täglich (lyrics: Salpeter)
- Die Novaks aus Prag (lyrics: Kurt Robitschek)
- Schön ist so ein Ringelspiel (lyrics: Peter Herz)
- Powidltatschkerln (lyrics: Rudolf Skutajan)
- Heute spielt der Uridil (lyrics: Robert Katscher and Hermann Leopoldi, music: Oskar Steiner and Oskar Virag)
- 32 Groschen ... (lyrics: Erwin W. Spahn)
- Jedlersee (lyrics: Salpeter)
- Kommen sie bitte nach Österreich (lyrics: Peter Herz and Charles Berndt)

== Sources ==
- Kuna, M., 1993. Musik an der Grenze des Lebens: Musikerinnen und Musiker aus Böhmischen Ländern in Nationalsozialistischen Konzentrationslagern und Gefängnissen, Frankfurt/M.: Zweitausendeins.
- Silverman, J., 2002. The Undying Flame: Ballads and Songs of the Holocaust, Syracuse University Press.
- Stompor, S., 2001. Judisches Musik- und Theaterleben unter dem NS-Staat, Hannover: Europaisches Zentrum fur Judische Musik.
- Hans Weiss, Ronald Leopoldi: Hermann Leopoldi und Helly Möslein. „In einem kleinen Café in Hernals …“. Eine Bildbiographie. Edition Trend S, Wien o. J. (1992), ISBN 3-7015-1001-6.
- Franziska Ernst: Hermann Leopoldi: Biographie eines jüdisch-österreichischen Unterhaltungskünstlers und Komponisten. Diplomarbeit an der Historisch-Kulturwissenschaftlichen Fakultät der Universität Wien, 2010 (Online-version)
- Felix Czeike: Historisches Lexikon Wien. Volume 4. Kremayr & Scheriau, Vienna 1995, ISBN 3-218-00546-9, p. 32.
- Rudolf Flotzinger: Oesterreichisches Musiklexikon. Volume 3. Österreichische Akademie der Wissenschaften, Vienna 2004, ISBN 3-7001-3045-7, p. 1258.
- Christian Klösch, Regine Thumser: From Vienna. Exilkabarett in New York 1938 bis 1950. Picus, Wien 2002, ISBN 3-85452-463-3, p. 31.
- Ronald Leopoldi: Leopoldiana. Gesammelte Werke von Hermann Leopoldi und 11 Lieder von Ferdinand Leopoldi in two volumes. Doblinger, Vienna 2011, ISBN 978-3-902667-23-6
- Elisabeth Leopoldi: Hermann Leopoldi. Composer, Viennese Cabaret Pianis and Incurable Optimist. Hentrich & Hentrich Verlag, Berlin Leipzig, 2019, ISBN 978-3-95565-332-3.
