= Der Mandarin =

The Mandarin
- Directed by: Fritz Freisler
- Written by: Fritz Freisler, Paul Frank
- Produced by: Arnold Pressburger
- Starring: Harry Walden, Carl Goetz, Nectar Flondor, Cornelia Haszay, Trude Merly, Hilde Radney, Gretl Ruth
- Production company: Sascha-Film
- Release date: 22 November 1918
- Running time: 61 minutes
- Country: Austria-Hungary
- Languages: Silent; German intertitles

Der Mandarin (English: The Mandarin) is a 1918 Austrian silent drama film directed by Fritz Freisler. It is an adaptation of the stage play of the same name, which was written by Paul Frank.

Der Mandarin was released on 22 November, 1918, just eleven days after the fall of Austria-Hungary at the end of World War I. The two main stars were Carl Goetz (as the Mandarin), and Harry Walden (as Baron von Stroom). The movie was thought to be a lost film until an Italian version, Il Mandarino, turned up in a donation to the George Eastman Museum.

== Plot ==
The director of a sanatorium in Vienna, Austria is talking to a writer about an odd case he encountered. Baron von Stroom had fallen in love with an actress but the love was unrequited. The Baron acquires a Chinese clay figure of a Mandarin, and it is told that any man possessing this figure can seduce any woman he desires. This appears to be true, as von Stroom proceeds to seduce first the actress, then the wife of a railroad baron, and even a princess by just saying "Man-Da-Rin" to make the statue come alive and work its magic. Unfortunately for the Baron, this magic has the price of not being able to seduce anyone unless the figurine is invoked. This drives von Stroom to madness and he eventually winds up at the insane asylum where he sees the Mandarin's face everywhere.
