= Young Medardus (play) =

1910 drama by Arthur Schnitzler

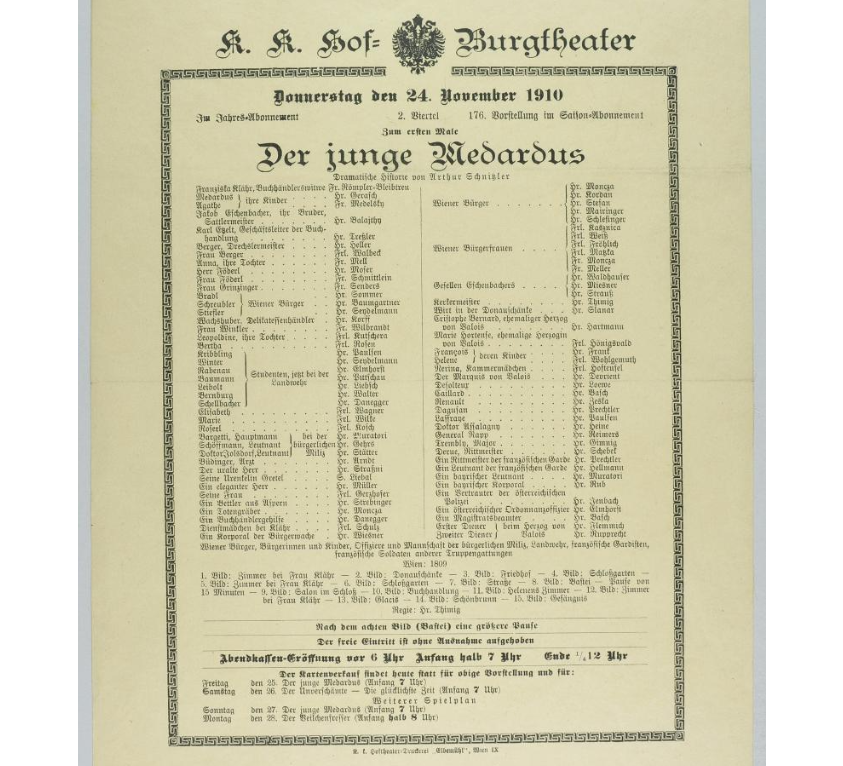
- Theatre bill of the play's premiere on 24 November 1910
- Original title: Der junge Medardus
- Original language: German
- Written by: Arthur Schnitzler
- Setting: Vienna, May-October 1809

Premiere
- Date: 24 November 1910
- Place: Burgtheater, Vienna

Young Medardus (German: Der junge Medardus) is a historical drama in a prelude and five acts by Austrian playwright Arthur Schnitzler. It premiered at the Burgtheater in Vienna on 24 November 1910, where it was directed by Hugo Thimig It tells the tale of Medardus, a flawed hero in the Shakespearean sense, who directs his final heroic deed against himself and perishes.

In March 1914, Schnitzler received the Raimund Prize for Der junge Medardus.

== Development ==
Schnitzler wrote the play to mark the 100th anniversary of the Battle of Aspern-Essling which took place in 1809. The plays takes place between May and October 1809. Schnitzler took inspiration from two real-life events and incorporated them into the play - the capture of Vienna by Napoleon on 13 May 1809, and a failed assassination attempt on the emperor by the German Friedrich Staps in October 1809 Schnitzler took inspiration for his portrayal of Viennese citizens from Caroline Pilcher's book Memories from my life.

== Plot ==
The Valois family lives in exile in Austria, near Vienna. 20-year-old François, the Prince of Valois, wants to marry Agathe Klähr. The young woman is the daughter of the proud widow and bookseller Franziska Klähr. The prince is denied permission to marry the girl by his family. The Valois family lay claim to the French throne. François and Agathe hold hands as they walk into the Danube, committing suicide. The 21-year-old Army officer Medardus Klähr, Agathe's brother, meets Princess Helene of Valois at the pair's funeral. Helene is the 20-year-old sister of François. Medardus shares his mother's patriotism and hatred of Napoleon. The Valois and Klähr family have a common enemy in the belligerent Corsicans. But an éclat creates bad blood. Helene insults the dead woman at the double grave. Medardus, who holds the Valois family responsible for his sister's death, insults her in return. Helene then promises her cousin Bertrand, the Marquis of Valois, that she will marry him if he kills Medardus in a duel. The hot-headed Medardus is lucky; he is not killed by the Marquis but critically wounded.

Helena mourns the death of her brother. Now that he is dead, the family's hope for the French throne are gone. Helena inquires about the injured Medardus. She sends her chambermaid to the Klähr's abode. Medardus wishes to get to revenge on Helene for the death of his sister after spending a "few wonderful nights" with her. They spend several nights together. Medardus, when he learns of Helene's intention to marry, volunteers for a sortie from the fortress of Vienna against the advancing Napoleonic troops. He considers this the way to appear at Helene's wedding. Helene lives outside of Vienna's city walls. Medardus himself does not quite know if he is driven by love or hate, but he knows he wishes to die. Helene, who is still keen to see the Valois take the French throne, seeks to get Medardus to support her interests. Napoleon, who in the meantime has taken Vienna, is residing at Schönbrunn. Helena approaches him to ask for imperial permission for the Valois family to return to France. Helene is regarded amongst the Venetians as being Napoleon's mistress. Medardus is ordered to kill Napoleon on Helene's behalf. Medardus hates Napoleon and had already toyed with the idea of assassinating him. But he is suddenly having second thoughts. Medardus, "the avenger of the fatherland" does not want to be the tool of the Valois.

On the eve of the peace treaty which Napoleon has dictated to the Austrians, there is a parade in the courtyard of Schönbrunn Palace, with some Viennese present. Medardus creeps up the palace steps towards Napoleon and Helene. Medardus lunges with a dagger; Helene gets in the way of his knife and is killed. Medardus is put into prison. Napoleon wishes to free him; after all, Medardus has killed a woman who sought to bring her family onto his throne. Medardus reacts to the surprising offer by telling Napoleon that he really wished to kill the emperor himself. He sticks to this claim, and is shot by a firing squad.

== Reception ==
The Viennese court reacted with hostility to the play. Schnitzler was forced by censors to change the ducal family's name from "Berry" to "Valois".

== See also ==
- Young Medardus, a 1923 silent film
