= Das Spielzeug von Paris =

1925 film

- French theatrical release poster
- Directed by: Michael Curtiz
- Based on: Red Heels by Margery Lawrence
- Produced by: Arnold Pressburger
- Starring: Lili Damita; Eric Barclay; Hugo Thimig; Georges Treville
- Cinematography: Gustav Ucicky, Max von Nekut
- Distributed by: Sascha-Film, Stoll Films, FPS, Union Artistic Films.
- Release date: 16 October 1925
- Country: Austria
- Language: Silent

Das Spielzeug von Paris (English title Red Heels) is an Austrian silent film released in 1925, and directed by Michael Curtiz. It was the first film to feature French actress Lili Damita in the leading role.

== Plot ==
A young British Bohemian (Eric Barclay), who lives in Paris, marries a stage dancer (Lili Damita). He persuades her to give up her stage career, and they take a cottage in the country. She accepts an invitation from her former manager (Georges Treville) to attend a party. She performs a dance at the party. She quarrels with her husband, but starts searching for him in the countryside on a stormy night. As a result, she catches pneumonia, and nearly dies. After being nursed back to health by her husband, she decides to give up the stage for good.

== Cast ==
- Lili Damita
- Hugo Thimig
- Eric Barclay
- Georges Tréville
- Theo Shall
- Hans Moser
- Marietta Millner
- Maria Fein as Fürstin Katharina

== Production ==
Based on the novel Red Heels by Margery Lawrence, Das Spielzeug von Paris was filmed largely in Paris by the Austrian company Sascha-Film, with the help of finance from the German FPS and the British Stoll film companies.

== Reception ==
=== Critical response ===
The film was well received by the film magazines of the time, although, sometimes, the storyline was criticized for being kitsch. Artur Berger's sets in particular were highly praised by film reviewers. The film was universally regarded as a success. Sascha-Film made two more films with the same team. Samuel Goldwyn invited Lili Damita to Hollywood after watching this film.

== Other information ==
=== Availability ===
Some copies of the film still exist, the most complete having Spanish intertitles. An advertising trailer also exists.

== Pop culture ==
The film inspired the song Tired of Dancing by William Helmore.

== Soundtrack ==
The original score of the film is considered lost. In 2009, Austrian musician Florian C. Reithner composed and recorded a new score in which he plays the original "Welte — Kinoorgel" (a cinema organ by German organ manufacturer "Welte") at "Filmmuseum Potsdam", Germany. The new music was first brought to audience in a broadcast by French television channel "France 3" in Winter 2009.

== See also ==
- Michael Curtiz filmography
