= The Marquis of Bolibar =

1922 film

- German: Der Marquis von Bolibar
- Directed by: Friedrich Porges
- Written by: Leo Perutz (novel); Friedrich Porges
- Starring: Hans Schindler
- Cinematography: Willy Winterstein
- Production company: Sun-Film
- Release date: 19 May 1922
- Country: Austria
- Languages: Silent; German intertitles

The Marquis of Bolibar (German: Der Marquis von Bolibar) is a 1922 Austrian silent film directed by Friedrich Porges and starring Hans Schindler. It is based on the 1920 novel of the same title by Leo Perutz.

The film's sets were designed by the art director Artur Berger, Hans Rouc and Julius von Borsody.

== Cast ==
- Hans Schindler as Marquis von Bolibar
- Josef Überacker as Oberst
- Otto Schmöle as Salignac
- Ida Koór as Monjita
- Karl Miksch as Maultiertreiber Perico
- Joe Lars as Captain Egloffstern
- Heinrich Fuchs as Lieutenant Günther
- Josef Zetenius
- Stefan Pichy
- Carl Lustig-Prean
- Hans Brausewetter

== See also ==
- Bolibar (1928)
