= The Dead Wedding Guest =

1922 film directed by Max Neufeld

- Directed by: Max Neufeld
- Written by: Heinrich Heine (poem); Eugen Preiß
- Starring: Eugen Neufeld; Karl Ehmann; Carmen Cartellieri
- Cinematography: József Bécsi; Stefan Lorant
- Production companies: Helios-Filmproduktion; Vita-Film
- Release date: 1922
- Running time: 87 minutes
- Country: Austria
- Languages: Silent; German intertitles

The Dead Wedding Guest (German: Der tote Hochzeitsgast) is a 1922 Austrian silent historical drama film directed by Max Neufeld and starring Eugen Neufeld, Karl Ehmann and Carmen Cartellieri. It is based on the poem Don Ramiro by Heinrich Heine, set in Spain.

The film's sets were designed by the art directors Artur Berger, Hans Rouc and Julius von Borsody.

== Cast ==
- Eugen Neufeld as Don Fernando
- Karl Ehmann as Narr
- Carmen Cartellieri as Donna Clara
- Max Neufeld as Don Ramiro
- Josef Recht as König
- Midy Elliot as Knappe Don Ramiros
- Eugen Preiß as Vertrauter
- Pauline Schweighofer as Mutter Donna Claras
- Eduard Selder as Vater Don Ramiros

== Bibliography ==
- Elisabeth Büttner & Christian Dewald. Das tägliche Brennen: eine Geschichte des österreichischen Films von den Anfängen bis 1945, Volume 1. Residenz, 2002.
