= Hans Rouc =

- Born: 13 August 1893; Vienna, Austro-Hungarian Empire
- Died: 26 January 1963 (aged 69); Vienna, Austria
- Occupation: Art Director
- Years active: 1921–1954 (film )

Hans Rouc (1893–1963) was an Austrian art director.

== Selected filmography ==
- The Marquis of Bolibar (1922)
- The Dead Wedding Guest (1922)
- Children of the Revolution (1923)
- The Hands of Orlac (1924)
- The Revenge of the Pharaohs (1925)
- The Priest from Kirchfeld (1926)
- The Right to Live (1927)
- If I Only Have Your Love (1953)

== Bibliography ==
- William B. Parrill. European Silent Films on Video: A Critical Guide. McFarland, 2006.
