= Carl Goetz =

Austrian actor (1862–1932)

- Born: Karl Perl; 10 April 1862; Vienna, Austrian Empire
- Died: 15 August 1932 (aged 70); Vienna, Austria
- Occupations: Film actor Stage actor
- Years active: 1913–1931 (film)

Carl Goetz (also spelled Karl Götz, 10 April 1862 – 15 August 1932) was an Austrian stage and film actor. He appeared in around seventy films during the silent and early sound eras. He is particularly noted for his role in Georg Wilhelm Pabst's Pandora's Box (1929).

== Biography ==
Goetz was born Karl Perl on 18 April 1862 in Vienna, Austria. He was of a Jewish background. He initially trained as a violinist. However, he opted for a stage career and made his debut in 1892 at the Stadttheater in St. Pölten. Following negative reviews, he emigrated to the USA in 1893 and worked in New York City as a newspaper cartoonist and book illustrator. He also performed as an occasional actor at the Germania Theatre, a German-language theatre.

Before 1900, he performed on stage in Colmar and Landshut. He then appeared in Munich cabarets and achieved his first successes as an actor in plays by August Strindberg, John Galsworthy, and Georg Kaiser. Despite his small stature and speech impediment, he was still able to perform in Vienna, Berlin, and at the Munich Kammerspiele.

In 1913, he began his film career with the role of a tramp in Paul von Woringen's film Die Landstraße (The Country Road). Goetz soon specialised in playing old men and unsightly characters. He was the village idiot in Bogdan Stimoff (1916), the repulsive husband in Licht und Finsternis (Light and Darkness) (1917), and the title character in Tragödie eines Häßlichen (Tragedy of an Ugly Man) (1921). In the films Der Mandarin (1919) and Die gelbe Gefahr (The Yellow Peril) (1922), he portrayed Asian characters. He was the court jester in the Munich grand production Der Favorit der Königin (The Favourite of the Queen) (1922). In other films, he played landowners, professors, or lords of the castle. In Die Mühle von Sanssouci (The Mill at Sanssouci) (1926), he appeared as the philosopher Voltaire. One of his best film roles, that of Schigolch, was secured for him by Georg Wilhelm Pabst to star opposite Louise Brooks as Lulu in Die Büchse der Pandora (Pandora's Box) (1928).

Goetz died on 15 August 1932 in Vienna. He was buried in an honorary grave in Vienna Central Cemetery (11-2-4).

(Adapted from the Austrian Biographical Lexicon.)

== Selected filmography ==
- Bogdan Stimoff (1916)
- Licht und Finsternis (1917)
- Tom Sawyer (1917)
- Der Mandarin (1918)
- The Count of Cagliostro (1920)
- The Fool and Death (1920)
- Dracula's Death (1921)
- Das Haus des Dr. Gaudeamus (1921)
- The Favourite of the Queen (1922)
- La Boheme (1923)
- The Expulsion (1923)
- The Mill at Sanssouci (1926)
- The Bank Crash of Unter den Linden (1926)
- Pratermizzi (1927)
- Princess Olala (1928)
- Scampolo (1928)
- My Heart is a Jazz Band (1929)
- Pandora's Box (1929)
- Fräulein Else (1929)
- The Singing City (1930)
- The Flute Concert of Sanssouci (1930)
- Danton (1931)
- Yorck (1931)
- The Paw (1931)
- The Song of Life (1931)
- 1914 (1931)
- Shadows of the Underworld (1931)
- The Woman They Talk About (1931)
