= Austria Press Agency =

National news agency of Austria

- Native name: Austria Presse Agentur
- Company type: Cooperative
- Industry: News media
- Founded: 1849; 177 years ago
- Headquarters: Vienna, Austria
- Area served: Austria
- Products: News, information services
- Revenue: 75,800,000 euro (2023)
- Owners: Austrian newspapers and ORF
- Number of employees: 511 (2023)
- Subsidiaries: APA-OTS Originaltext-Service GmbH
- Website: www.apa.at

The Austria Press Agency (German: Austria Presse Agentur, APA) is the national news agency and the leading information provider in Austria. It is owned by Austrian newspapers and the national broadcaster ORF.

== Legal case ==
In 1994, prior to Austria's accession to the European Union, the Austrian government contracted with APA under an indefinite term agreement for the supply of press-related services. The contract was subsequently amended, transferring the contract from APA to a wholly-owned subsidiary, APA-OTS, converting the cost to Euros, adjusting the price, and revising the contract's price indexation clause. A rival business, pressetext Nachrichtenagentur GmbH, challenged the amendments, arguing that they constituted the award of a new contract which should have been procured competitively under the legal regime for procurement which applied to Austria after it joined the EU. The issues were referred by the Austrian Bundesvergabeamt (Federal Procurement Office) to the European Court of Justice, which issued a preliminary ruling on 19 June 2008. The Court ruled that in the circumstances, the amendments did not amount to a material change to the contract, and the government actions were justified.

== See also ==
- Telegraphen-Korrespondenz Bureau
