= The Expulsion (film) =

1923 film

- Poster
- Directed by: F. W. Murnau
- Written by: Carl Hauptmann; Thea von Harbou
- Produced by: Erich Pommer
- Starring: Carl Goetz
- Cinematography: Karl Freund
- Production company: Decla-Bioscop
- Distributed by: UFA
- Release date: 23 October 1923
- Running time: 57 minutes
- Country: Germany
- Languages: Silent; German intertitles

The Expulsion (German: Die Austreibung) is a 1923 silent German drama film directed by F. W. Murnau. The film is now considered to be lost. The film's sets were designed by the art directors Erich Czerwonski and Rochus Gliese. Location shooting took place in the Riesengebirge.

== Plot ==
Old man Steyer (Carl Goetz) lives on a mountainside farm with his wife (Ilka Grüning), widowed son (Eugen Klöpfer), and granddaughter, Aenne (Lucie Mannheim). The son marries Ludmilla (Aud Egede-Nissen), a very poor girl from a nearby village. Ludmilla loves Lauer (William Dieterle), a local hunter, but Lauer is too poor to marry her. Ludmilla continues her affair with Lauer even after the marriage.

Ludmilla asks her new husband to sell the farm and move to the village, as she cannot stand being isolated in the mountains. The son agrees, hoping it will make Ludmilla love him. They go to the village to sign a deed of sale. The son drinks heavily, decides to marry Aenne to Lauer, and then has second thoughts about selling the farm.

Unable to find her husband, who has gone to the notary to cancel the sale, Ludmilla asks Lauer to take her home. A blizzard has begun, and they are unable to make it back up the mountain. They take refuge in Lauer's cabin instead, where they begin to make love. The son, however, follows their tracks in the snow. He finds them in the cabin, and brutally assaults Lauer.

The next morning, the son and Ludmilla return to the farm, their marriage in ruins. They discover that the mother and father have decided to leave their beloved home, now that it has been sold, and have already packed all their things.

== Cast ==
- Carl Goetz as Father Steyer
- Ilka Grüning as Mother Steyer
- Eugen Klöpfer as Son Steyer
- William Dieterle as Lauer, the Hunter (as Wilhelm Dieterle)
- Aud Egede-Nissen as Ludmilla
- Emilie Kurz as tailor
- Robert Leffler as priest
- Lucie Mannheim as Aenne
- Jakob Tiedtke as Rentschreiber

Screenshot

== See also ==
- List of lost films
