= Leo Perutz =

Austrian novelist and mathematician

- Born: 2 November 1882; Prague, Austria-Hungary
- Died: 25 August 1957 (aged 74); Bad Ischl, Austria
- Occupations: Novelist; mathematician

Leopold Perutz (2 November 1882 – 25 August 1957) was an Austrian novelist and mathematician. Born in Prague, he lived in Vienna until the Nazi Anschluss in 1938, when he emigrated to Palestine.

According to the biographical note on the Arcade Publishing editions of the English translations of his novels, Leo was a mathematician who formulated an algebraic equation which is named after him; he worked as a statistician for an insurance company. He was related to the biologist Max Perutz.

During the 1950s he returned occasionally to Austria, spending the summer and autumn months in the market town of St. Wolfgang im Salzkammergut in the Salzkammergut resort region and in Vienna. He died in the Austrian spa town of Bad Ischl in 1957. He wrote his first novel, The Third Bullet, in 1915 while recovering from a wound sustained in the First World War. In all Perutz wrote eleven novels, which gained the admiration of Jorge Luis Borges, Italo Calvino, Ian Fleming, Karl Edward Wagner and Graham Greene. Wagner cited Perutz's novel The Master of the Day of Judgment as one of the thirteen best non-supernatural horror novels.

== Biography ==
Perutz was born in Prague to a largely non-religious family of Jewish ancestry. They moved to Vienna in 1901, where he attended various schools and colleges before studying probability theory, statistics, actuarial science, and economics. He became an insurance actuary at Assicurazioni Generali in Trieste and Der Anker in Vienna and "developed the widely used Perutz equalization formula.". He married his first wife, Ida Weil, in 1918; they had three children before she died of childbirth in 1928. He married his second wife, Gret Humburger in 1935 and emigrated to Palestine in 1938, where he refused to join literary groups or contribute to literary magazines, claiming, "So I am, as far as my work is concerned, a foreign body in this country and shall remain so." After World War II, he maintained a summer residence in St. Wolfgang on Wolfgangsee, Austria and died after a heart attack at Bad Ischl.

== Writing ==
Perutz's novels are short and are usually historical novels combining fast-paced adventure with a metaphysical twist. They are influenced by the work of E. T. A. Hoffmann, Arthur Schnitzler and Victor Hugo (whose work Perutz translated into German). Austrian fellow novelist Friedrich Torberg once characterized Perutz's literary style as the possible result of a little infidelity of Franz Kafka and Agatha Christie. The Marquis of Bolibar (1920) features the Wandering Jew appearing during Napoleon's campaign in Spain. The Master of the Day of Judgement (1921) is a decidedly different mystery story about the circumstances surrounding an actor's death in the early twentieth century. In his Aesthetic Theory, Theodor W. Adorno called it "a thriller of genius." Little Apple (1928) concerns a First World War soldier's obsessive quest for revenge. By Night Under the Stone Bridge (1952) is an episodic work whose separate stories are bound together by the illicit love shared, in their dreams, by a Jewish woman and the Emperor Rudolf II. In the posthumously-published Leonardo's Judas (1959), da Vinci's quest for an appropriate face to give the betrayer in his Last Supper is interwoven with the squabble between a usurer and the merchant to whom he owes money. A Kabbalistic atomosphere is present in many of his novels.

The title of his 1933 novel Saint Peter's Snow (published in English in 1935 as The Virgin's Brand), which is set in what was then the present day, refers to a drug which induces religious fervour; the Nazis, understandably, did not care for it. Critic Alan Piper considered it "a psychological detective story", although it has varyingly been categorised as science fiction or fantasy. Piper believed that the novel was decades ahead of its time due to the description of a hallucinogenic drug derived from an ergot fungus 10 years before the discovery of LSD. He also thought it astonishing that it discussed the experimental use of this hallucinogen on an isolated village 20 years before the 1951 Pont-Saint-Esprit mass poisoning, and proposed that ergot was the psychoactive ingredient used in the ancient mystery cults 40 years before this was put forward as a serious proposal.

In his discussion of German language fantastic literature, critic Franz Rottensteiner describes Perutz as "undoubtedly the finest fantasy author of his time". Literary scholar Alan Piper described Perutz's work as typically containing "an element of the fantastic, with dramatic plots featuring confusing and conflicting interpretations of events".

== Novels by Perutz in English translation ==
(Dates of publication are for the original German-language editions)

- From Nine to Nine (1918)
- The Marquis of Bolibar (1920)
- The Master of the Day of Judgment (1921)
- Turlupin (1924)
- Little Apple (1928)
- Saint Peter's Snow (1933)
- The Swedish Cavalier (1936)
- By Night under the Stone Bridge (1953)
- Leonardo's Judas (1959)

== Filmography ==
- The Adventure of Doctor Kircheisen, directed by Rudolf Biebrach (1921, based on the novel Das Mangobaumwunder)
- Die Geburt des Antichrist, directed by Friedrich Feher (1922, based on the novel Die Geburt des Antichrist)
- The Marquis of Bolibar, directed by Friedrich Porges (1922, based on the novel Der Marques de Bolibar)
- Bolibar, directed by Walter Summers (UK, 1928, based on the novel Der Marques de Bolibar)
- The Cossack and the Nightingale, directed by Phil Jutzi (1935, based on the novel Der Kosak und die Nachtigall)
- Historia de una noche, directed by Luis Saslavsky (Argentina, 1941, based on the play Morgen ist Feiertag)
- Historia de una noche, directed by Luis Saslavsky (Spain, 1963, based on the play Morgen ist Feiertag)
- The Master of the Day of Judgment, directed by Michael Kehlmann (1990, TV film, based on the novel The Master of the Day of Judgment)
- Saint Peter's Snow, directed by Peter Patzak (1991, TV film, based on the novel Saint Peter's Snow)

== See also ==
- List of Austrian writers
