= Telegraphen-Korrespondenz Bureau =

The Telegraphen-Korrespondenz Bureau, also referred to by many other names (Austrian Correspondence, Österreichische Correspondenz, Kaiserlich und Königlich Telegraphen-Korrespondenz Bureau, K.u.k. Telegraphen-Korrespondenz-Bureau, or Korbureau, or Corrbureau, or simply KKTK) was a news agency founded in the Austrian Empire in 1849 by Joseph Tuvora (1820–1872) under the auspices of the Austrian government. It is a direct predecessor of the current Austria Press Agency.

Tuvora founded the Österreichische Correspondenz ("Austrian Correspondence") in Vienna on October 10, 1849. At that time, private telegraph and correspondent networks had already been founded in a few other countries, such as Agence Havas in France (predecessor to present-day AFP) in 1835, the Associated Press in the United States in 1846, and the Wolff'sche Telegraphische Bureau in Prussia also in 1849. Two years later, Paul Julius Reuter would establish Mr. Reuter's Cabled Messages Office (now Reuters) in London.

Although it was founded as a private company, KKTK would serve as a de facto mouthpiece for the Habsburg government. In 1859, for better access by the administration, the news agency was officially nationalized, renamed as the Kaiserlich und Königlich Telegraphen-Korrespondenz Bureau, now regarded as the world's first state-owned news agency. The initial Kaiserlich und Königlich (or K.u.K.) in its name, which was common in many Austrian companies then, means "imperial and royal" and refer to the fact that the Habsburg monarchy was both an empire (in Austria) and a kingdom (in Hungary and subsidiary realms such as Croatia and Bohemia). During its existence, KKTK worked internationally through exchange contracts with Reuters and Agence Havas, and was one of the main wire services in the 19th century.

Eventually, after the outbreak of World War I, in 1914, KKTK was incorporated into the k.u.k. Kriegspressequartier (war press office). APA in its modern form was established only in 1945, after the liberation of Austria in World War II.

== History of KKTK ==
=== Early years ===
Joseph Tuvora was an Austrian journalist who had been one of the leaders of the Revolution of 1848, cracked down one year earlier. After the defeat, he decided to change sides and rally with the new Austrian government. From its beginnings, the "Austrian Correspondence" was a telegraphic press agency. Then Minister of Justice, Alexander von Bach, wished to use it to refute the "lies" of the press and counter the diffusion of news against the government. In exchange, Tuvora accepted a yearly subsidy of 340 guilders.

After the Austro-Italian war of that year, the takeover of the Italian territories by Czech Marshal Joseph Radetzky, who commanded the Austrian army in Lombardy and Veneto, led to somewhat a decentralization of the "Austrian Correspondence", with the staff adding officials in each region of the empire. After the death of chancellor Felix Schwarzenberg, on April 5, 1852, Von Bach became the most important figure in the state. He resumed censorship and sent his trusted men to rule Hungary, which he divided into five districts, while Transylvania and Croatia were directly ruled from Vienna.

Tuvora then invited Edward Warrens (1820–1872), a former US consul in Trieste, to become editor-in-chief of the Austrian Lloyd's Journal. From its beginnings in 1833, the Austrian Lloyd's was created as a company centralizing information related to maritime transport, via an international network of correspondents and newspapers, whose trade with the East would be boosted after November 1854, when Mohammed Sa'id, new viceroy of Egypt, granted Ferdinand de Lesseps the permission to build the Suez Canal. Tuvora also wanted to develop the agency in general information. Inspired by the model of Havas, he visited the French agency newsroom in 1858 in Paris. In the late 1850s, Österreichische Correspondenz had a branch of its "press office" in Paris, directed by journalist Miklós Jósika, in which Lajos Kossuth (later a prominent Hungarian author) collaborated.

These projects were halted by a professional error. On June 4, 1859, the "Austrian Correspondence" wrongly announced the Austrian victory, specifying that a reinforcement of 50,000 troops had defeated the French on the bank of Ticino, while the actual battle ended a decisive victory for the Franco-Sardinian forces. The Austrian agency had been misled by a stock market hoax in Northern Italy, transmitted by telegraph to England and Belgium. At the end of the Battle of Magenta. The fake news for some time reversed the direction of prices on the Paris stock market. One week later, on June 11, the Austrian Council of Ministers decided to establish its own news agency for Austria and Hungary, granting state monopoly to it, as desired for years by a former figure of Austrian politics, Klemens von Metternich. Once nationalized, the "Austrian Correspondence" was renamed "Kaiserlich und Königlich Telegraphen-Korrespondenz Bureau (Office of Telegraph Correspondence). Österreichische Correspondenz sent its last dispatches in December 1859, and was succeeded by KKTK.

== The 1860s ==
The new KKTK or Korrbureau was installed in Vienna in the Modenapalais in Herrengasse. A year later, it was moved to the imperial arsenal in Renngasse, and integrated into the military command. Its first director was General Josef Wilhelm von Gallina (1820–1883), a theoretician of war movement and later chief of staff of the Austrian army. Ludwig Hirschfeld, hired in 1861, took the post of secretary general in 1866. Swiss scientist Karl Brunner von Wattenwy, former physics professor at the University of Bern, who headed the Swiss telegraph administration from 1853 to 1857, became responsible for the same service in Austria and remained there for the rest of the decade. Von Wattenwy was recruited to develop the Austrian telegraph network and boost infrastructure. It was a time when Austria was carrying out the reforms desired by the liberal parties. On June 19, 1861, MP Eduard Herbst proposed four committees to work on a new constitution, including one to institute more press freedom. From 1862 to 1867, however, the freedom of the press granted was affected, as another law allowed any news outlet to be immediately suspended in the event of war or near war.

In June 1866, during the Austro-Prussian War, at the Battle of Sadowa, Prussia defeated Austria, in part thanks to the telegraph. The Austrian army once more first announced a victory and denied its defeat, just like seven years earlier.

After the war, liberals acquired a majority in the Reichsrat. The press was selling, but small newspapers, mostly conservative, had to buy news from the mainstream liberal newsroom. The government then appointed Edward Warrens as the head of KKTK, mostly to serve the domestic press. Warrens was also close to Friedrich Ferdinand von Beust, who would become Minister-President of Austria in February 1867.

The news agencies cartel established in 1859 predicted that the Habsburg realms would be explored by Wolff alone, but in 1866, KKTK began negotiating an agreement with both Havas and Wolff, prompting Reuters to try to gain a foothold in Vienna as well. During the same month, Herbst proclaimed his ideals of freedom. In 1867, he became Minister of Justice in the Auersperg cabinet. In January 1867, the Foreign ministry, now under Von Beust, gained control over KKTK. The agency was then refounded, during the compromise to turn Habsburg Austrian into the Austrian-Hungarian dual monarchy. Its activity is carried away for two years, as the liberal administration allowed the proliferation of daily newspapers. But, as KKTK was still very dependent on Wolff for news from abroad, in February 1867 the Austrians opened a bureau in Prague, and then in May another one in Trieste.

On May 30, 1869, Havas and Wolff signed with KKTK a news exchange agreement, changing its news from Prague, Agram, Pesth and Lemberg for that of Western Europe and Wall Street.

=== Bismarck threats ===
Between 1887 and 1889, German chancellor Otto von Bismarck endeavored to "torpedo the existing alliance between the major world agencies and generalists, Reuters, Havas, Associated Press and the Continental Agency (Wolff), to replace it with a "telegraph Triple Entente" grouping together the German, Austrian and Italian agencies (Agenzia Stefani). It failed, however. During the last decade of the century, the chairman of the Italian Council, Francesco Crispi, promoted the breaking up with Havas, which he accused of propagating false or biased information against Italy, or encouraging France's foreign policy. A mutual exchange agreement was signed by Stefani with Wolff, and KKTK joined, as well as with Reuters, to allow governments to control and censor, if necessary, news from and abroad. As a result, the cartel was further loosened, which made room for Stefani and KKTK to grow.

=== The end of KKTK ===
The KKTK was greatly reduced during World War I. In November 1918, in the aftermath of the Central Powers defeat, Austria was proclaimed a republic and KKTK was split: each bureau in the former empire became the headquarters for a new national agency: the office in Budapest was taken by the Magyar Távirati Iroda (MTI), the one in Prague became the ČTK and the one in Agram (Zagreb) was added to the new Avala agency in Yugoslavia.

The KKTK delegate in Paris, writer Paul Zifferer, who was also press officer and cultural attaché to the Austrian embassy in Paris, presented himself at Agence Havas to explain that the KKTK "had completely renounced the pre-war errors" and refused to "receive anything other than German information" from Wolff. He proposed Allied agencies to centralize news from the Balkans and to disseminate their information there, but was refused. On December 17, 1919, then KKTK director, Joseph Karl Wirth (later chancellor of the Weimar Republic), signed another contract with Havas and Reuters for ten years, which made it a simple repeater of the other agencies in Austria, while Havas became a news collector by opening an office in Vienna.
