= Ferdinand Andri =

Austrian architect

- 1940 self-portrait of Andri
- Born: 1 March 1871; Waidhofen an der Ybbs, Austria-Hungary
- Died: 19 May 1956 (aged 85); Vienna, Austria
- Occupation: Architect

Ferdinand Andri (1 March 1871 – 19 May 1956) was an Austrian architect. His work was part of the architecture event in the art competition at the 1936 Summer Olympics.

== Life ==
Ferdinand Andri was born the son of a gilder. He served an apprenticeship from 1884 to 1886 with the woodcarver and altar builder Johann Kepplinger in Ottensheim near Linz. He attended the Staatsgewerbeschule in Innsbruck. He then studied at the Academy of Fine Arts in Vienna from 1886 to 1893 with Julius Victor Berger, Eduard von Lichtenfels and August Eisenmenger. From 1892 to 1894, he attended the Grand Ducal School of Art with Caspar Ritter and Claus Meyer. He took study trips to Italy, France, England and North America.

In 1897 he married the painter Charlotte Hampel (1863–1945), who was eight years his senior.

From 1899 to 1909, Andri was a member of the Vienna Secession and, in 1905/06, its president. During this time, he collaborated on the Art Nouveau magazine Ver Sacrum. When he joined the Deutscher Werkbund in 1912, he was already considered an accomplished landscape, genre and portrait painter. He also gained general recognition as a lithographer and sculptor. Nevertheless, when he was proposed as a teacher for the Vienna Academy in 1914, he was rejected by Archduke Franz Ferdinand, who had no use for modern art trends.

In the second year of the First World War, 1915, Andri applied for admission to the Imperial and Royal War Press Headquarters as a war painter. It was granted on 13 September 1915. He was first sent to Belgrade, where he painted in November and December 1915. In 1916 he travelled as an artistic reporter to the Bay of Cattaro, then to Montenegro and then to Albania. In the same year, he came to the Ortler area as a war painter and recorded numerous impressions in the Dolomites. In 1918, he was stationed with Tyrol's 10th Army Command of the Imperial and Royal Army. Army in Tyrol, he took the opportunity to make portrait studies of participants in a mountain guide course at the Regensburger Hütte. He also created several poster designs for the benefit of the Children's Relief Fund, the War Invalids Foundation and wartime exhibitions, for which he benefited from his experience as a graphic artist with the Vienna Secession. In 1918, at the war's end, Andri moved to St. Pölten; at the same time, he received a teaching position at the Vienna Academy, where he taught until 1939.

At the Vienna Academy, he directed a master school from 1923 to 1929 or a systemized master school from 1929 to 1939. In 1923-26 and 1931–33, Andri was prorector and, immediately after the annexation of Austria to the German Reich, one of the three provisional directors of the academy responsible for the political purges that followed. On 27 June 1938 he applied for membership in the NSDAP and was admitted retroactively to 1 May that year (membership number 6.255.574). In 1939 he retired and, from that year, was a member of the Künstlerhaus in Vienna. From 1939 to 1945, Andri directed a master school for fresco painting at the academy. Andri was listed on Joseph Goebbels' so-called Gottbegnadeten list as an important painter of the Third Reich. Andri was an expert advisor for music at the National Socialist German Cultural Association. He was also a co-founder of the Austrian Werkbund, which focused on the revival of craftsmanship.

In 1950, Ferdinand Andri gave all the works still in his possession to the city of St. Pölten, which established a Ferdinand Andri Museum (now part of the City Museum). In 1956 the artist died in Vienna and was buried in St. Pölten.

== Literature ==
- August Kopisch, Ferdinand Andri (illustrations), Hans Fraungruber (ed.): Ausgewählte Gedichte. Gerlach & Wiedling, Vienna 1904 (Gerlach's Jugendbücherei; 13).
- Exhibition and festival guide for the 400th anniversary of the liberation from Turkish distress in Waidhofen an der Ybbs, 13–21 August 1932. Gewerbliche Presse, Vienna 1932.
- Adolf Bassaraba: The painter Ferdinand Andri. St. Pöltner Zeitungsverlagsgesellschaft, St. Pölten 1941 (Niederdonau; 46).
- Art exhibition Ferdinand Andri, open from 9 June to 15 October 1957 (...). Self-published by the town of Waidhofen an der Ybbs, Waidhofen an der Ybbs 1954.
- Karl Gutkas: Art exhibition Ferdinand Andri and his school. 8th special exhibition in the Karmeliterhof, 7–22 April 1956. Magistrat der Stadt Kulturamt St. Pölten, St. Pölten 1956.
- Karl Gutkas: Professor Ferdinand Andri 85 years old. In: Kulturberichte aus Niederösterreich (1956), p. 22 f.
- Art exhibition Ferdinand Andri. Self-published by the Waidhofen an der Ybbs Cultural Office, Waidhofen an der Ybbs 1957.
- Otto Hiehammer: Waidhofen an der Ybbs honors Ferdinand Andri. Memorial exhibition. In: Kulturberichte aus Niederösterreich (1957), p. 55.
- Oskar Matulla: Ferdinand Andri and Lassing. In: Cultural Reports from Lower Austria. (1960), p. 84 f.
- Karl Gutkas / Leopold Schmid: Ferdinand Andri. 1871–1956. painter, sculptor, graphic artist and teacher. Catalog of the exhibition of the Kuluturamt of the city of St. Pölten during the St. Pölten Culture and Festival Weeks 1971. Kulturamt St. Pölten, St. Pölten 1971.
- Bernhard Peithner-Lichtenfels (editor): Ferdinand Andri. (Exhibition catalog). Gallery Peithner-Lichtenfels, Vienna 1980.
- Liselotte Popelka (ed.): Vom "Hurra" zum Leichenfeld. Paintings from the War Picture Collection 1914–1918. (Catalog). Museum of Military History, Vienna 1981.
- Peter Weninger (editor): Ferdinand Andri. 1871–1956. Exhibition of the Cultural Department of the Lower Austrian Provincial Government (...) Maretsch Castle, Bolzano, 7–30 October 1982, Bad Vöslau Castle, 13 November 1982 - 9 January 1983. Office of the Lower Austrian Provincial Government, Department III/2 - Cultural Department, Vienna 1983 (Catalog of the Lower Austrian Provincial Museum, Vol. N.F. 126).
- Peter Weninger, Martin Suppan (ed.), Elisabeth Rehulka (transl.): Wachaumaler. Wachaumotive: A Danube Landscape in 19th and 20th Century Paintings. Suppan Gallery, Vienna 1987.
- Felix Czeike (ed.): Andri Ferdinand. In: Historical Encyclopedia Vienna. Vol. 1, Kremayr & Scheriau, Vienna 1992, ISBN 3-218-00543-4, p. 102 (digital copy).
- Karl Wilhelm: Introduction to the "Toy and Work Show" of the art educator Prof. Karl Wilhelm. In: Waidhofner Heimatblätter, vol. 18 (1992), p. 30 ff.
- Thomas Pulle: Ferdinand Andri. Notes on his early work. In: Franz Forstner (ed.): Sensuality and Temptation. Art Nouveau and Secession Art from Andri to Olbrich. Special exhibition, 9 May to 2 November 1997. Cultural Administration St. Pölten, St. Pölten 1997, pp. 11–20.
- Beatrix Bastl: "Three Painters - Two Wars": Ferdinand Andri, Erich Erler and Carl Fahringer. A special exhibition in the Wiener Neustadt City Archives. In: Unsere Heimat. Vol. 69 (1998), pp. 146–149.
- Thomas Pulle: "..., he is nevertheless able to express ... the tremendous tension, one might almost say, the majesty of war." Some remarks on Ferdinand Andri's pictorial work during the First World War. In: St. Pöltner Regenbogen 1998. cultural yearbook of the provincial capital St. Pölten (1998), pp. 13–21.
- Ilse Krumpöck: From the Clouds to the Homeland. The War Painter Ferdinand Andri. In: Viribus Unitis. Annual Report of the Army History Museum 2006. Army History Museum, Vienna 2007, pp. 19–52.
