= Friedrich Porges =

Austrian-American film director, journalist and screenwriter

Friedrich ( Frederick ) Porges
- Born: 14 July 1890; Vienna, Austro-Hungarian Empire
- Died: 24 January 1978 (aged 87); Los Angeles, California, United States
- Citizenship: Austrian, American (from 1949)
- Occupation: Journalist-author-screenwriter-film critic-movie director-publisher
- Years active: 1908-1975
- Spouse: Helene Matzner (m.1913, died 1985)

Friedrich ( Frederick ) Porges (1890–1978) was an Austrian-American film director of the silent era, journalist, publisher, screenwriter, author and film critic. Of Jewish background, he fled Vienna just prior to the Anschluss of 1938 and emigrated to Britain and the United States.

== Life and career ==
=== Early life up to 1938 ===
The son of Ludwig Porges, a banker, and Viktoria Bing, Friedrich Porges became interested in journalism in his youth. Already while studying modern philology at the University of Vienna, he wrote for numerous newspapers. Thereafter, he became a regular contributor to Viennese daily papers such as Der Morgen, Die Zeit, Der Tag, Das Journal, for which he also wrote short stories, and a correspondent for Ullstein-Press Berlin. He also contributed to film and theater publications for example, Allgemeine Theater Zeitung, Vienna (1912, as publisher), and Die Bühne (starting in 1925). He was acting Editor in Chief of Montag Morgen in Berlin (1923).

Porges wrote many frequently broadcast radio plays and, for Sascha-Film starting in 1917, several silent film screenplays, for example, Cherchez la Femme (1920), which were usually directed by Michael Kertesz (later known as Michael Curtis).

Friedrich Porges was the director of numerous movies in the silent film era of the 1920s, having made his directing debut with Die Nacht der Mary Murton and Der Marquis de Bolibar (after the novel by Leo Perutz).

In 1925, Porges founded and was Editor in Chief until 1938 of the popular Austrian weekly magazine, Mein Film - Illustrierte Film und Kinorundschau ("My Film - Illustrated Film and Movie Review"). This magazine had an accompanying book series Mein Film Buch (1926-1933) in which, for example, Porges' book about Charlie Chaplin, -- the first to appear in Austria -- Charlie Chaplin der Vagabund der Welt, was published.

From 1930 on, he was a member of P.E.N.

=== Emigration ===
Just prior to the annexation of Austria into Nazi Germany in 1938, Porges, who was Jewish, was able to emigrate from Vienna via Switzerland to London, and from there to the United States. In London, he also worked as journalist and movie critic until his emigration to the US in 1943.

=== US/Hollywood Career ===
Following his emigration to the United States in 1943, Porges subsequently lived and worked continuously as journalist, correspondent, critic, and screenplay editor in Los Angeles/Hollywood almost up until his death in 1978. There, in Hollywood, he wrote the German-language versions of the Walt Disney animated movies, Fantasia, Saludos Amigos, and Bambi. He also began his decades-long reporting for the publication Aufbau, New York, for the "Westküste" (West Coast) section of which he wrote about general political and cultural subjects of California. Porges also had his own regular column therein, "Man About Hollywood," devoted to film. "Interviews with leading Hollywood personalities, critical or cynical, but also enthusiastic views of events connected to the big screen, gave him the opportunity to display his vast knowledge on the subject of motion pictures."

During WWII, and for many years thereafter, he worked for the US State Department and "The Voice of America," and was Hollywood correspondent for numerous large postwar publications and radio stations in Switzerland, Austria, and Germany.

Friedrich Porges was a founding member of the Hollywood Foreign Press Association, of which he was elected president three times (1948, 1954, and 1957). In 1961 he served as chairman of the board.

In 1959, he was awarded the "Dimitri Tiomkin International Press Award" for the best Hollywood story of the year.

== Books ( selected titles ) ==
Die Liebe des Thomas Hill ( "The Love of Thomas Hill" ), 1920

Charlie Chaplin der Vagabund der Welt ( "Charlie Chaplin, The Vagabond of the World" ), 1931

Mensch in Fesseln ( "Man in Shackles" ), a Drama about Heinrich Heine, 1931

Schatten erobern die Welt, wie Filme und Kino Wurden ( "Shadows Conquer the World, How Film and Movies Came to Be" ), 1946

== Selected filmography ==
- Die Nacht der Mary Murton ( "The Night of Mary Murton" )(1921)
- Der Marquis von Bolibar ( "The Marquis of Bolibar")(1922)
- Die Tochter des Brigadiers ( "The Daughter of the Brigadier" ) (1922), after Alexandre Dumas
- Adam und Eva ("Adam and Eve") )(1923)
- Der Film im Film ("The Film in the Film" )(1924), in which actors such as Asta Nielsen and Conradt Veit, as well as the director, Fritz Lang, give commentaries
- Alles will zum Film ("Everybody Wants to be in the Movies" ) (1927)

== Awards ==
Dimitri Tiomkin International Press Award 1959

== Personal life ==
Friedrich Porges was married from 1913 until his death in 1978 to Helene Matzner ( 1891–1985), who emigrated with him to the US. They had two daughters, Stella (1914–1999) and Erica (1917–1978), who were also able to emigrate to California.
