= Harun al Raschid (film) =

1924 film by Michael Curtiz

- Directed by: Michael Kertész
- Written by: Paul Frank
- Produced by: Arnold Pressburger
- Starring: Adolf Weisse; Mary Kid
- Cinematography: Gustav Ucicky
- Distributed by: Sascha-Film
- Release date: 1924
- Country: Austria

Harun al Raschid is a 1924 Austrian film directed by Michael Curtiz.
