= Sascha-Film =

Austrian film company

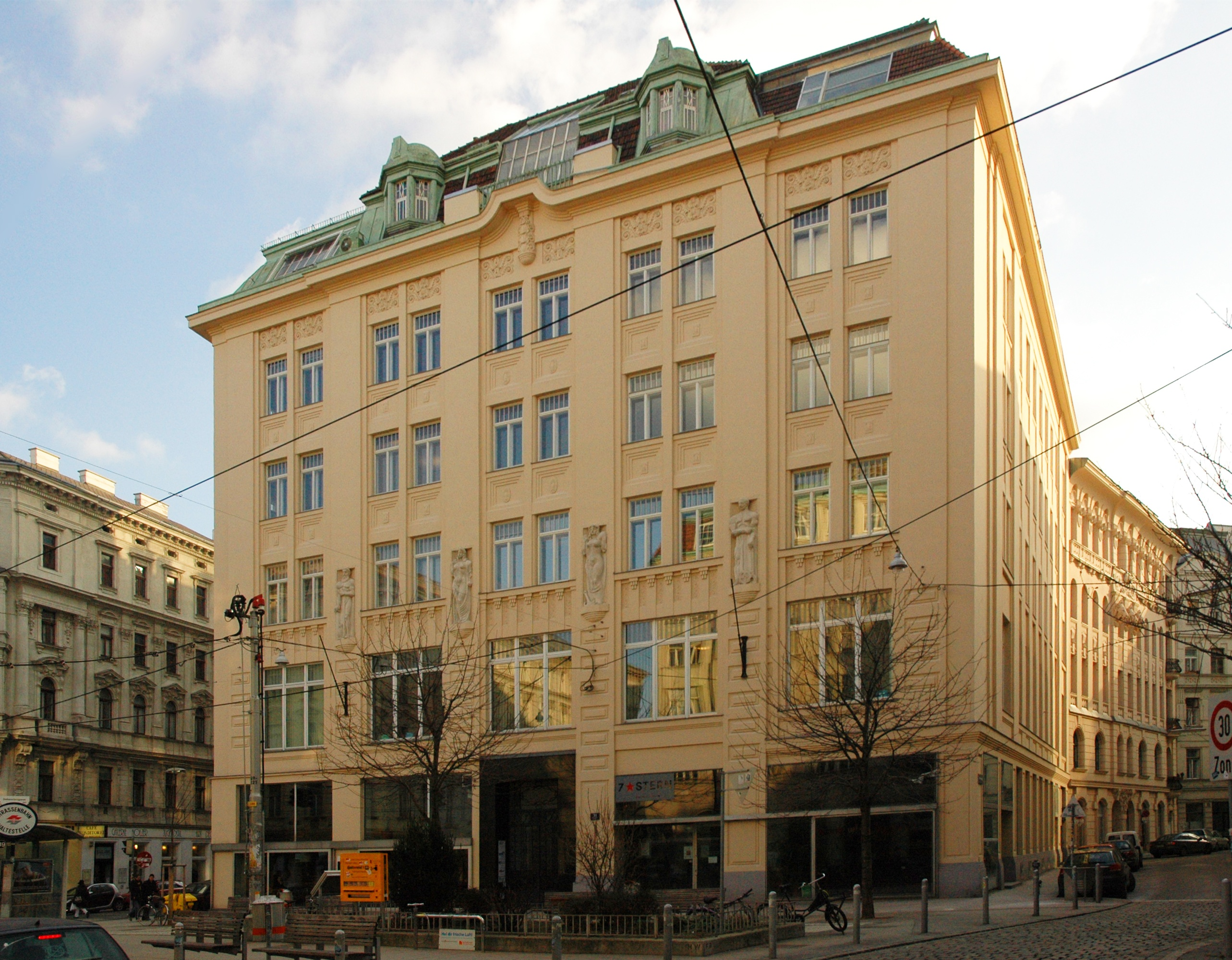
Former headquarters in Vienna.

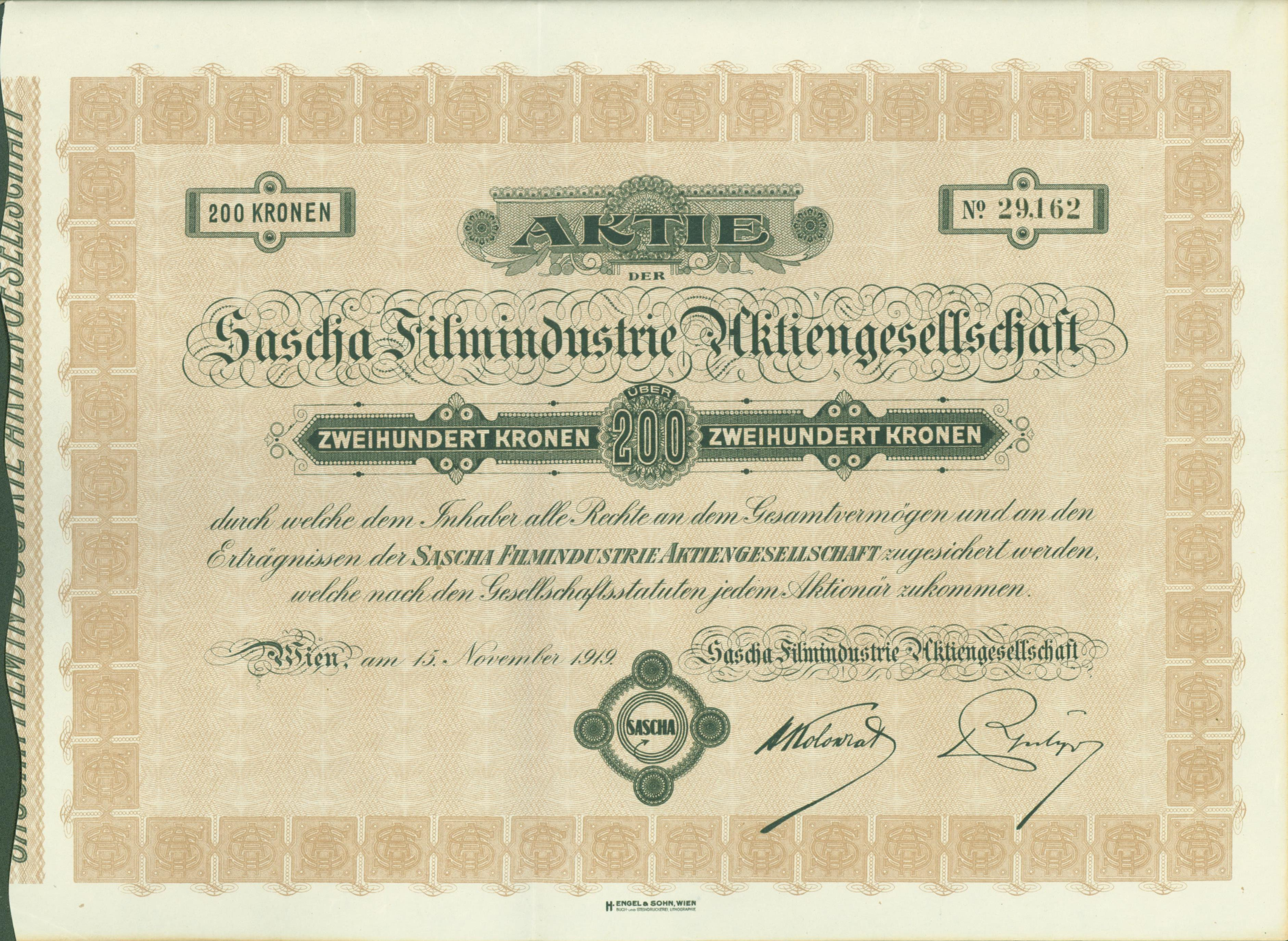
Share of the Sascha Filmindustrie AG, issued 15 November 1919

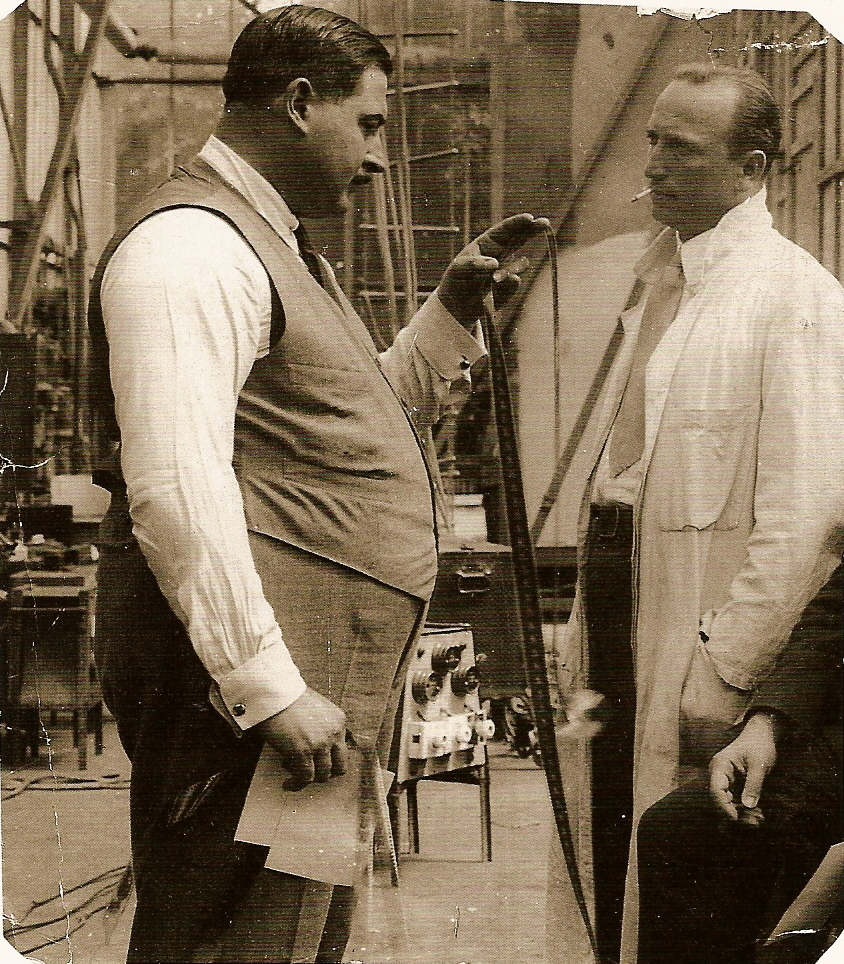
Count Alexander Kolowrat-Krakowski at the studio in 1916

Sascha-Film, in full Sascha-Filmindustrie AG and from 1933 Tobis-Sascha-Filmindustrie AG, was the largest Austrian film production company of the silent film and early sound film period.

== History ==
The business was established in 1910 by Alexander Joseph "Sascha", Count Kolowrat-Krakowsky as the Sascha-Filmfabrik ("Sascha Film Factory") in Pfraumberg in Bohemia, and relocated in 1912 to Vienna. During World War I the company produced war newsreels and propaganda films, with a large studio being built in 1916 in Vienna-Severing. On 10 September 1918, after the merger with the film distributors Philipp & Pressburger, the business became the Sascha-Filmindustrie AG.

Sascha produced epic films such as Alexander Korda's Prinz und Bettelknabe ("Prince and Beggar") (1920), Michael Curtiz's Sodom und Gomorrha (1922), and Curtiz's Die Sklavenkönigin ("The Slave Queen") (1924). After Kolowrat-Krakowsky's death in 1927, the Sievering studio was set up to produce sound films in 1932, and a studio in Rosenhügel was acquired in 1933.

Around 1933/1934 the German enterprise Tobis-Tonbild-Syndikat was amalgamated with the company, known formally from then on as the Tobis-Sascha-Filmindustrie AG. In 1938, in the context of the Anschluss, by which Austria was annexed to the Third Reich, the concern passed into the ownership of the National Socialist government and was re-founded as Wien-Film GmbH. Its best-known director of the period to the end of the war was Gustav Ucicky. After the end of the war the name Sascha-Film was re-established for a couple of decades, and in the 1950s and 1960s produced light entertainment films.

== Selected films ==
- 1912: Die Gewinnung des Erzes am steirischen Erzberg in Eisenerz ("The extraction of ore on the Styrian ore mountain in Eisenerz"; documentary, c. 6 min; direction by Sascha Kolowrat-Krakowsky)
- 1912: Kaiser Joseph II.
- 1913: Der Millionenonkel (c. 60 min; direction by Hubert Marischka)
- 1915: The Other I (Das andere Ich) (direction by Fritz Freisler)
- 1916: Wien im Kriege (direction by Heinz Hanus)
- 1917: Heldenkampf in Schnee und Eis
- 1918: Der Mandarin (61 min; direction by Paul Frank, Fritz Freisler)
- 1921: Good and Evil (film) (direction by Michael Curtiz)
- 1922: Sodom und Gomorrha (direction by Michael Curtiz)
- 1922: Harun al Raschid (direction by Michael Curtiz)
- 1923: Der junge Medardus (direction by Michael Curtiz)
- 1924: Die Sklavenkönigin (70 min; direction by Michael Curtiz)
- 1925: Das Spielzeug von Paris (direction by Michael Curtiz)
- 1927: Café Elektric (direction by Gustav Ucicky)
- 1927: Die Pratermizzi
- 1929: Bright Eyes (co-production with British International Pictures)
- 1930: Geld auf der Straße (direction by Georg Jacoby)
- 1934: Maskerade (direction by Willi Forst)
- 1934: Hohe Schule (direction by Erich Engel)

== See also ==
- Cinema of Austria
