= Alfred Grünwald (librettist) =

Austrian author, librettist and lyricist (1884–1951)

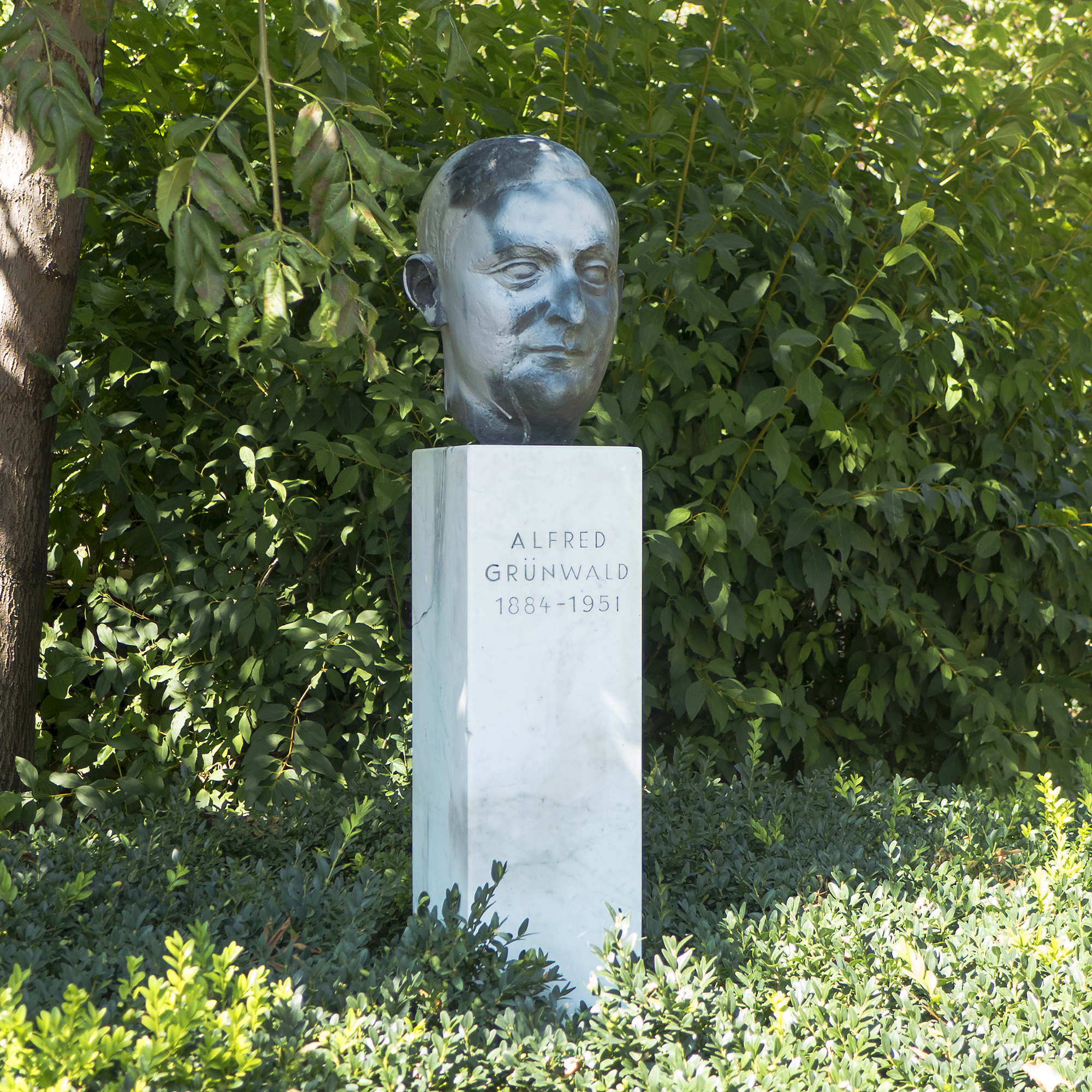
- Alfred Grünwald memorial, Alfred-Grünwald-Park, Mariahilf, Vienna
- Born: 16 February 1884; Vienna, Austria
- Died: 24 February 1951 (aged 67); Forest Hills, Queens, New York City
- Occupation: Librettist
- Years active: 1905–1945
- Notable credit: Gräfin Mariza
- Spouse: Mila Löwenstein
- Children: Henry A. Grunwald

Alfred Grünwald (1884–1951) was an Austrian author, librettist, and lyricist. Some of his better-known works were written in conjunction with the composers Franz Lehár, Emmerich Kálmán, Oscar Straus, Paul Abraham, and Robert Stolz.

== Life and career ==
Grünwald was born on 16 February 1884 in Vienna. Following his schooling, he worked in a number of jobs, including as supernumerary, chorister, and for a theatrical agency, before turning to writing as theatre critic for a Vienna newspaper. From 1909, he wrote Kabarett sketches and librettos for operettas, often collaborating with Julius Brammer.

As a Jew, he was arrested after the Anschluss of Austria in 1938. When he was temporarily released, the family fled to Paris, then in 1940 via Casablanca and Lisbon to New York City. During World War II he was employed for a time with the Office of War Information translating American songs for transmission by radio to Germany.

A number of Grünwald's librettos were produced on Broadway. These included Countess Maritza (1926), The Yankee Princess (1922), The Circus Princess (1927), and The Duchess of Chicago (1929). He also wrote a number of comedies, including Dancing Partner (1930), written in collaboration with Alexander Engel and produced on Broadway by David Belasco. He was a member of the American Society of Composers, Authors and Publishers.

Grünwald died on 24 February 1951 in Forest Hills, Queens, New York City.

His son Henry A. Grunwald was a journalist and diplomat (US ambassador to Austria from 1988 to 1990).

== Works ==
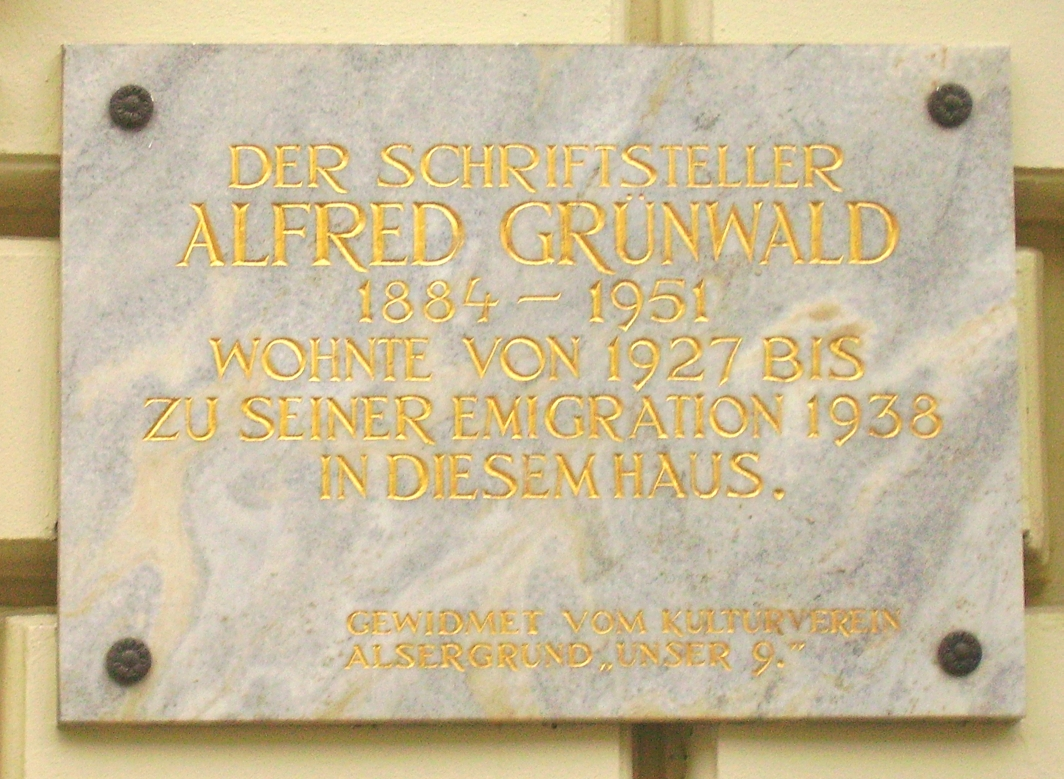
Memorial plaque in Vienna Alsergrund – "The writer Alfred Grünwald lived from 1927 until his emigration in 1938 in this house."

- 1908 Die lustigen Weiber von Wien, music by Robert Stolz
- 1912 Hoheit tanzt Walzer, music by Leo Ascher
- 1916 Die Rose von Stambul, collaboration with Julius Brammer, music by Leo Fall
- 1920 Der letzte Walzer (The Last Waltz), music by Oscar Straus
- 1924 Gräfin Mariza (Countess Maritza), music by Emmerich Kálmán
- 1926 Die Zirkusprinzessin (The Circus Princess), music by Emmerich Kálmán
- 1928 Die Herzogin von Chicago (The Duchess of Chicago), music by Emmerich Kálmán
- 1930 Dancing Partner (play)
- 1930 Viktoria und ihr Husar (Victoria and Her Hussar), with Fritz Löhner-Beda, music by Paul Abraham
- 1930 Das Veilchen vom Montmartre, music by Emmerich Kálmán
- 1931 Die Blume von Hawaii (The Flower of Hawaii), with Fritz Löhner-Beda, music by Paul Abraham
- 1932 Ball im Savoy, music by Paul Abraham
- 1932 Eine Frau, die weiß, was sie will (A Woman Who Knows What She Wants), music by Oscar Straus
- 1937 Die polnische Hochzeit, music by Joseph Beer
- 1954 Arizona Lady, music by Emmerich Kálmán

== Filmography ==
- The Rose of Stamboul, directed by Felix Basch (Germany, 1919, silent)
- Countess Maritza, directed by Hans Steinhoff (Germany, 1925)
- The Circus Princess, directed by Adolf Gärtner (Germany, 1925)
- Her Highness Dances the Waltz, directed by Fritz Freisler (Austria, 1926)
- The Laughing Husband, directed by Rudolf Walther-Fein and Rudolf Dworsky (Germany, 1926)
- The Last Waltz, directed by Arthur Robison (Germany, 1927)
- The Circus Princess, directed by Victor Janson (Germany, 1929)
- The Merry Wives of Vienna, directed by Géza von Bolváry (Germany, 1931)
- Just a Gigolo, directed by Jack Conway (1931, based on Dancing Partners)
- Victoria and Her Hussar, directed by Richard Oswald (Germany, 1931)
- Gräfin Mariza, directed by Richard Oswald (Germany, 1932)
- The Flower of Hawaii, directed by Richard Oswald (Germany, 1933)
- A Woman Who Knows What She Wants, directed by Václav Binovec (Czechoslovakia, 1934)
  - A Woman Who Knows What She Wants, directed by Victor Janson (Germany, 1934)
- The Last Waltz, directed by Georg Jacoby (Germany, 1934)
- Ball im Savoy, directed by Steve Sekely (Austria, 1935)
- Her Highness Dances the Waltz, directed by Max Neufeld (Austria, 1935, based on Hoheit tanzt Walzer)
  - Tanecek panny márinky, directed by Max Neufeld (Czechoslovakia, 1935, based on Hoheit tanzt Walzer)
  - Valse éternelle, directed by Max Neufeld (France, 1936, based on Hoheit tanzt Walzer)
- Dschainah, das Mädchen aus dem Tanzhaus, directed by Vilmos Gyimes (Austria, 1935)
- The Last Waltz, directed by Leo Mittler (France, 1936)
  - The Last Waltz, directed by Leo Mittler (UK, 1936)
- Ball at Savoy, directed by Victor Hanbury (UK, 1936)
- 3 : 1 a szerelem javára, directed by Johann von Vásáry (Hungary, 1937)
  - Roxy and the Wonderteam, directed by Johann von Vásáry (Austria, 1938)
- The Rose of Stamboul, directed by Karl Anton (West Germany, 1953)
- The Last Waltz, directed by Arthur Maria Rabenalt (West Germany, 1953)
- Victoria and Her Hussar, directed by Rudolf Schündler (West Germany, 1954)
- Ball im Savoy, directed by Paul Martin (West Germany, 1955)
- A Woman Who Knows What She Wants, directed by Arthur Maria Rabenalt (West Germany, 1958)
- Mister Iks, directed by Yuliy Khmelnitsky (Soviet Union, 1958, based on Die Zirkusprinzessin)
- Gräfin Mariza, directed by Rudolf Schündler (West Germany, 1958)
- The Circus Princess, directed by Svetlana Druzhinina (Soviet Union, 1982)
