= Julius Brammer =

Austrian librettist

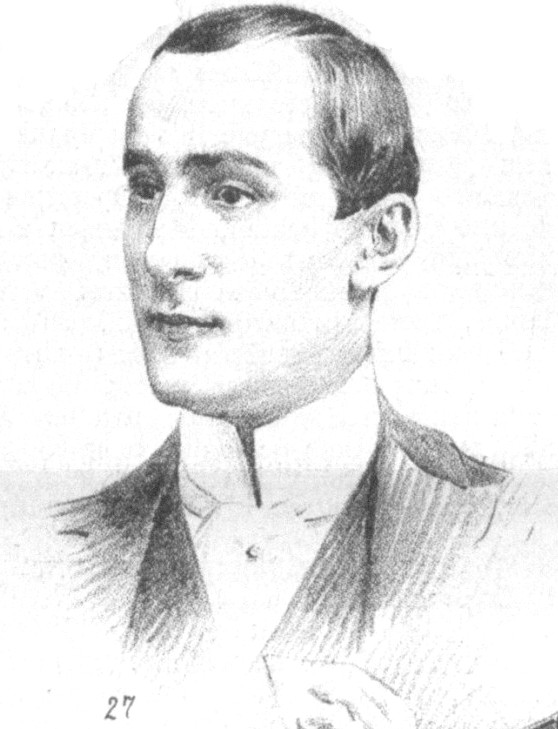
Julius Brammer in 1902

Julius Brammer (9 March 1877 – 18 April 1943) was an Austrian librettist and lyricist. Some of his better-known works were written in conjunction with the composers Emmerich Kálmán, Oscar Straus, Leo Ascher, Edmund Eysler and Robert Stolz.

== Life ==
Brammer was born in Sehraditz, Moravia (present-day Sehradice, near Zlín), the son of Hermann and Julie. He trained as an actor and first appeared in the Staatstheater am Gärtnerplatz in Munich. He later transferred to Vienna, where he became involved in operetta productions at the Theater an der Wien. From 1908 he concentrated on writing libretti, often with Alfred Grünwald, and became one of the leading creative artists of the Vienna "Silver Operetta Period" (about 1900 to 1920).

After the Anschluss, as a Jew, he was forced to emigrate and went to Paris, and after the fall of that city during World War II, to the non-occupied south of France, where he died in Juan-les-Pins.

One of his most enduring numbers, still popular in several translations, is "Schöner Gigolo, armer Gigolo", in English "Just a Gigolo" (lyrics by Julius Brammer, music by Leonello Casucci). It was recorded by many musicians of the time, including Bing Crosby, Louis Armstrong, Dajos Béla and Richard Tauber, later by Louis Prima, and is still being recorded in different languages. The song appeared in a 1931 film, a 1932 Betty Boop cartoon, a 1978 movie and a 1993 TV series, all titled after the song.

== Select works (libretti) ==
- 1905 Elektra, with Alfred Grünwald; music by Béla Laszky
- 1911 Die Dame in Rot, with Alfred Grünwald; music by Robert Winterberg
- 1912 Hoheit tanzt Walzer, with Alfred Grünwald; music by Leo Ascher
- 1913 Der lachende Ehemann, with Alfred Grünwald; music by Edmund Eysler
- 1913 Die ideale Gattin, with Alfred Grünwald; music by Franz Lehár
- 1915 Die schöne Schwedin, with Alfred Grünwald; music by Robert Winterberg
- 1916 Die Kaiserin, a.k.a. Fürstenliebe, with Alfred Grünwald; music by Leo Fall
- 1916 Die Rose von Stambul, with Alfred Grünwald; music by Leo Fall
- 1917 Bruder Leichtsinn, with Alfred Grünwald; music by Leo Ascher
- 1918 Dichterliebe (Heinrich Heine), with Alfred Grünwald; music by Felix Mendelssohn-Bartholdy
- 1920 Der letzte Walzer (The Last Waltz), with Alfred Grünwald; music by Oscar Straus
- 1921 Die Bajadere (The Yankee Princess), with Alfred Grünwald; music by Emmerich Kálmán
- 1924 Gräfin Mariza (Countess Maritza), with Alfred Grünwald; music by Emmerich Kálmán
- 1926 Die Zirkusprinzessin (The Circus Princess), with Alfred Grünwald; music by Emmerich Kálmán
- 1928 Die Herzogin von Chicago (The Duchess of Chicago), with Alfred Grünwald; music by Emmerich Kálmán

== Filmography ==
- The Rose of Stamboul, directed by Felix Basch (Germany, 1919)
- Countess Maritza, directed by Hans Steinhoff (Germany, 1925)
- The Circus Princess, directed by Adolf Gärtner (Germany, 1925)
- Her Highness Dances the Waltz, directed by Fritz Freisler (Austria, 1926)
- The Laughing Husband, directed by Rudolf Walther-Fein and Rudolf Dworsky (Germany, 1926)
- The Last Waltz, directed by Arthur Robison (Germany, 1927)
- The Circus Princess, directed by Victor Janson (Germany, 1929)
- The Merry Wives of Vienna, directed by Géza von Bolváry (Germany, 1931)
- Gräfin Mariza, directed by Richard Oswald (Germany, 1932)
- The Last Waltz, directed by Georg Jacoby (Germany, 1934)
- Her Highness Dances the Waltz, directed by Max Neufeld (Austria, 1935, based on Hoheit tanzt Walzer)
  - Tanecek panny márinky, directed by Max Neufeld (Czechoslovakia, 1935, based on Hoheit tanzt Walzer)
  - Valse éternelle, directed by Max Neufeld (France, 1936, based on Hoheit tanzt Walzer)
- The Last Waltz, directed by Leo Mittler (France, 1936)
  - The Last Waltz, directed by Leo Mittler (UK, 1936)
- The Rose of Stamboul, directed by Karl Anton (West Germany, 1953)
- The Last Waltz, directed by Arthur Maria Rabenalt (West Germany, 1953)
- Mister X, directed by Yuliy Khmelnitsky (Soviet Union, 1958, based on Die Zirkusprinzessin)
- Gräfin Mariza, directed by Rudolf Schündler (West Germany, 1958)
- The Circus Princess, directed by Svetlana Druzhinina (Soviet Union, 1982)
