= Her Highness Dances the Waltz =

Her Highness Dances the Waltz may refer to:

- Her Highness Dances the Waltz (1926 film), an Austrian silent romance film
- Her Highness Dances the Waltz (1935 film), a musical comedy film
- Hoheit tanzt Walzer (Her Highness Dances the Waltz), an operetta by Leo Asche
