= Olga Titkova =

Russian actress and operetta singer (1941–2025)

- Ольга Титкова
- Born: 26 August 1941; Novosibirsk, Novosibirsk Oblast, Russian SFSR, USSR
- Died: 11 February 2025 (aged 83)

Olga Vasilyevna Titkova (Russian: Ольга Васильевна Титкова; 26 August 1941 – 11 February 2025) was a Russian actress. As the leading soloist of the Novosibirsk Musical Theatre she was an Honored Artist of the RSFSR (1988), People's Artist of Russia (2004), and winner of the Golden Mask theatre award (2002).

== Life and career ==
Olga Titkova was born in Novosibirsk on 26 August 1941, to a creative family, but despite this, she initially did not dream of becoming an actress and after graduating from school the future theatre artist entered a technical school, after which Titkova began working as a radio technician at an enterprise, where she was engaged in amateur performances (jazz singing and poetry reading). However, her plans changed when Novosibirsk Theatre of Musical Comedy (modern Novosibirsk Musical Theatre) was opened.

In 1968, she graduated from the Lunacharsky State Institute for Theatre Arts and began her career at the Novosibirsk Theatre of Musical Comedy in the same year.

Titkova died on 11 February 2025, at the age of 83.

== Some roles ==
- Adele – Die Fledermaus by Johann Strauss II
- Princess Jutta – Das Hollandweibchen by Emmerich Kálmán
- Justine – Madame Favart by Jacques Offenbach
- Pamela – Dear Pamela (based on the play by John Patrick)
- Karolina – Mister Iks (This operetta was a Russian adaptation of Die Zirkusprinzessin by Emmerich Kálmán)
- Nekhama – The Drayman and the King by Vladimir Alenikov
- Donna Lucia – Charley's Aunt by Brandon Thomas
- Atuyeva – Krechinsky's Wedding (performance based on Aleksandr Sukhovo-Kobylin's comedy)

== Family ==
- Father – Vasily Titkov (1907–1977), was a painter, member of the Artists' Union of the USSR.
- Uncle – Ivan Titkov (1905–1993), was also a painter.
- Sister – Rita is a choir artist in the opera theatre.
- Cousin – Eleonora Titkova (1937–2016) was an opera director, Merited Worker of the Arts of the Russian Federation, the chief director of the Novosibirsk Theatre of Musical Comedy (1982–1989 and 2002–2012).

== Awards ==
In 2002, she became a laureate of the Golden Mask theatre award for her performance as Countess Dankova in the Der Graf von Luxemburg by Franz Lehár. This Golden Mask was the first in the history of the Novosibirsk Theatre of Musical Comedy.

=== State awards ===
Olga Titkova was awarded the titles of Honored Artist of the RSFSR (1988) and People's Artist of Russia (2004).
