= The Circus Princess (1925 film) =

1925 film

- Directed by: Adolf Gärtner
- Written by: Ludwig Hamburger; Julius Brammer (libretto); Alfred Grünwald (libretto)
- Starring: Josefine Dora; Olga Engl; Johanna Ewald
- Cinematography: Hans Bloch
- Music by: Felix Bartsch
- Production company: Wilhelm Feindt
- Distributed by: Wilhelm Feindt
- Release date: 22 December 1925
- Country: Germany
- Languages: Silent; German intertitles

The Circus Princess (German: Die Zirkusprinzessin) is a 1925 German silent film directed by Adolf Gärtner and starring Josefine Dora, Olga Engl and Johanna Ewald. It is based on the operetta Die Zirkusprinzessin. Another German silent film adaptation was released in 1929. The film's sets were designed by the art director Carl Ludwig Kirmse.

== Cast ==
In alphabetical order

- Josefine Dora
- Olga Engl
- Johanna Ewald
- Cilly Feindt
- Angelo Ferrari
- Robert Garrison
- Rudolf Klein-Rhoden
- Rudolf Lettinger
- Clementine Plessner
- Otto Reinwald
- Alexandra Sorina
- Hans Trautner
- Bruno Ziener

== Bibliography ==
- Kurt Gänzl, Andrew Lamb. Gänzl's book of the musical theatre. Schirmer Books, 1989.
