= Titkov =

Titkov (Russian: Титков) is a Russian surname. The feminine form is Titkova (Russian: Титкова). Notable people with the surname include:

- Nikolai Titkov (born 2000), Russian football player
- Olga Titkova (1941–2025), Soviet and Russian stage actress
