= Rich, Young and Beautiful =

1928 film

- Directed by: Fritz Freisler
- Written by: Fritz Grünbaum (play); Wilhelm Sterk (play); Fritz Freisler
- Starring: Fay Marbe; Ernő Verebes; Igo Sym
- Cinematography: Günther Krampf
- Production company: Sascha-Film
- Release date: 12 October 1928
- Country: Austria
- Languages: Silent; German intertitles

Rich, Young and Beautiful (German title: Dorine und der Zufall) is a 1928 Austrian silent film directed by Fritz Freisler and starring Fay Marbe, Ernő Verebes and Igo Sym. It was made by Austria's leading film studio Sascha-Film. In 1929 the film was released in Britain by Ideal Films.

The film's sets were designed by the art director Hans Ledersteger.

== Cast ==
- Fay Marbe as Dorine, ein Mädchen aus dem Dollarlande
- Ernő Verebes as Emanuel, ein Mathematiker
- Igo Sym as Robert, ein junger Kaufmann
- Hans Thimig as Paul
- Richard Waldemar

== Bibliography ==
- Bock, Hans-Michael & Bergfelder, Tim. The Concise CineGraph. Encyclopedia of German Cinema. Berghahn Books, 2009.
