= Countess Maritza (1925 film) =

1925 film

- Directed by: Hans Steinhoff
- Written by: Max Glass; Julius Brammer (libretto); Alfred Grünwald (libretto)
- Starring: Vivian Gibson; Harry Liedtke; Colette Brettel
- Cinematography: Nicolas Farkas
- Music by: Emmerich Kálmán
- Production company: Terra Film
- Distributed by: Terra Film
- Release date: 20 November 1925
- Running time: 85 minutes
- Country: Germany
- Languages: Silent; German intertitles

Countess Maritza (German: Gräfin Mariza) is a 1925 German silent romantic comedy film directed by Hans Steinhoff and starring Vivian Gibson, Harry Liedtke and Colette Brettel. It is an adaptation of the operetta of the same title. It was shot at the Marienfelde Studios of Terra Film in Berlin. The film's sets were designed by the art director Julius von Borsody.

== Cast ==
- Vivian Gibson as Gräfin Maritza
- Harry Liedtke as Graf Tassilo
- Colette Brettel as Lisa
- Fritz Spira as Graf von Wittenburg
- Robert Garrison as Fürst Moritz Dragomir Populescu
- Ernő Verebes as Baron Koloman Zsupan
- Hedwig Pauly-Winterstein as Elvira Pranticzek
- Wilhelm Diegelmann as Penizek
- Emil Heyse as Dr. Tarrasch
- Siegfried Berisch as Mendel Popper
- Carl Geppert as Freier

== Bibliography ==
- Grange, William. Cultural Chronicle of the Weimar Republic. Scarecrow Press, 2008. ISBN 978-0-8108-5967-8.
