= Benno Kusche =

German opera singer (1916-2010)

- Benno Kusche, in the 1950s
- Born: 30 January 1916; Freiburg im Breisgau
- Died: 14 May 2010 (aged 94)
- Occupation: Operatic baritone
- Title: Kammersänger
- Awards: Order of Merit of the Federal Republic of Germany; Bavarian Order of Merit

Benno Paul Kusche (30 January 1916 – 14 May 2010) was a German operatic baritone, who was praised as one of the best Mozart and Wagner singers, especially in character roles and opera buffa.

== Career ==
Born in Freiburg im Breisgau, Kusche was the son of the painter Paul Kusche. From 1935 to 1937 he attended the theatre academy of the Badisches Staatstheater Karlsruhe. There he discovered his talent as a singer. He made his debut at the Heidelberg Opera Festival in 1938. Kusche received his first engagement in 1938 at the Theater Koblenz. He joined the Theater Augsburg in 1939. Here he was active until his conscription for military service in 1941 and, after being wounded and discharged, returned to the Augsburg company from 1943 until the theatre was bombed in 1944.

Soon after the collapse of the Nazi dictatorship he played in operettas in the Kurhaus Göggingen, then at Augsburg. From 1946 Kusche belonged to the Bavarian State Opera as a bass baritone known beyond Germany and was a member of the Deutsche Oper am Rhein from 1958.

In the summer of 1951 he sang Beckmesser in Wagner's Die Meistersinger von Nürnberg staged by Heinz Tietjen at the Royal Opera House in London under the musical direction of Sir Thomas Beecham. The singer gave guest performances in the role in Vienna, Berlin and Stuttgart, at La Scala in Milan, in London, Florence, Zurich, Buenos Aires, Bregenz and Brussels, among others. In the 1971/72 season, he sang it at the Metropolitan Opera in New York.

Beckmesser was Kusche's signature role. His talent, which tended towards comedy, made him a suitable choice also for La Roche, the theatre director in Capriccio by Richard Strauss. Further important roles were Alberich in Wagner's Der Ring des Nibelungen, the title role in Verdi's Falstaff, Leporello in Mozart's Don Giovanni, Faninal in Der Rosenkavalier by Richard Strauss, Papageno in Mozart's Die Zauberflöte, Waldner in Arabella by Richard Strauss, and Don Alfonso in Mozart's Così fan tutte, among others. Kusche played roles in operettas, notably Zsupan in Der Zigeunerbaron by Johann Strauss, Ollendorff in Der Bettelstudent and Frank in Die Fledermaus by Johann Strauss.

He worked for opera broadcasts by WDR in Cologne during the 1950s and 1960s as part of the ensemble working with the conductor Franz Marszalek. They recorded well-known operettas such as Schwarzwaldmädel, Gasparone and Gräfin Mariza, but also rarely played works such as Jabuka by Johann Strauss, and Paroli by Leo Fall. Kusche also appeared in contemporary opera, for example as an animal tamer in Alban Berg's Lulu and in buffo roles in Carl Orff's stage works, among others. He appeared regularly in Augsburg as Tevje in Fiddler on the Roof (Anatevka) until 1988.

Kusche also appeared in films, for example Nackt wie Gott sie schuf (with Marisa Allasio and Ellen Schwiers), or took small roles in the movies, including A Summer You Will Never Forget (with Claus Biederstaedt, Karin Dor, Fita Benkhoff), Mein Mädchen ist ein Postillion (with his wife Christine Görner and the Kessler Twins). He appeared as a guest star in the cult series Klimbim 5 May 1976. In 1975, he appeared for the ZDF with Julia Migenes, Bruce Low and others in the role of the mayor in the operetta Viktoria und ihr Husar and also appeared in Noch ’ne Oper with Margit Schramm, Rudolf Schock and Ilse Werner.

Kusche was a Bavarian Kammersänger and holder of the Bundesverdienstkreuz 1. Klasse and the Bavarian Order of Merit.

Kusche had a daughter Eveline from his first marriage. In 1960 he married the actress and soubrette Christine Görner. They were divorced in 1986. Christian Kusche-Tomasini, their son, works as a film composer in Italy.

== Recordings ==
=== Recordings ===
- Die Meistersinger von Nürnberg (with Rudolf Schock) (EMI)
- Die Kluge (EMI)
- Lulu (with Anneliese Rothenberger) (EMI)
- Don Giovanni (with George London)
- Gasparone 1956, with Josef Metternich, conductor Franz Marszalek
- Die Fledermaus 1976, conductor Carlos Kleiber (Deutsche Grammophon 457 765–2)
- Der Zigeunerbaron 1954, conductor Franz Marszalek (EMI / Ariola Eurodisc 71680/81 IE)
- Der fidele Bauer 1963, with Heinz Hoppe, Symphonie-Orchester Graunke, conductor Carl Michalski (EMI)
- Der Vogelhändler, with his wife Christine Görner (Amiga)
- Robert Stolz – Meine schönsten Melodien, with Christine Görner (Europa)
- Operetta excerpts, often with Christine Görner (EMI)
- Opera excerpts (BMG)

=== Recordings for radio and television ===
- Operette recordings Westdeutscher Rundfunk Cologne
- Zum Blauen Bock
- Klimbim
- Der Rosenkavalier, with Benno Kusche, Brigitte Fassbaender, Gwyneth Jones, Lucia Popp, Manfred Jungwirth, Anneliese Waas, David Thaw, Gudrun Wewezow, Francisco Araiza; director Otto Schenk, conductor Carlos Kleiber, orchestra und chorus of the Bayerische Staatsoper 1979)

== Literature ==
- Karl-Josef Kutsch, Leo Riemens: Großes Sängerlexikon. Erster Band: A–L, Bern/Stuttgart 1987, p. 1603–1604.
- Zum 90. Geburtstag des Bassbaritons Benno Kusche. in Süddeutsche Zeitung (30 January 2006).
