= Arizona Lady =

Operetta by Emmerich Kálmán

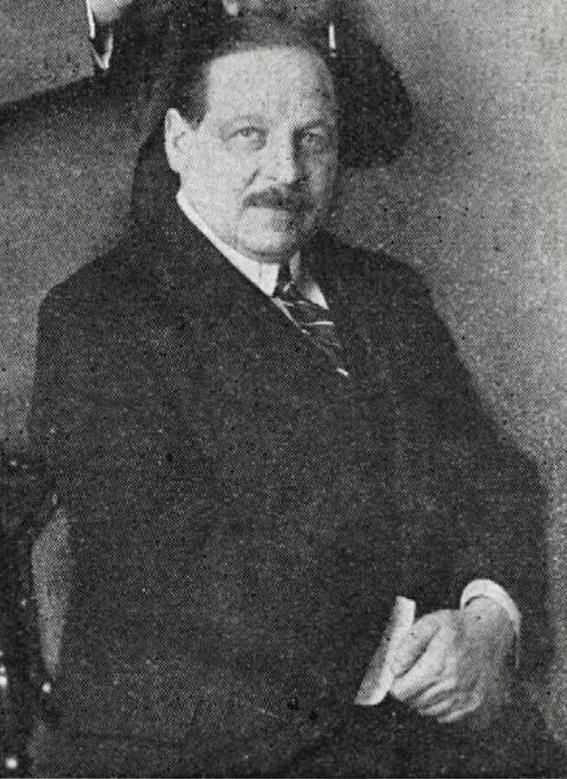
Emmerich Kálmán

Arizona Lady is an operetta in two acts by Hungarian composer Emmerich Kálmán. The libretto was written by Alfred Grünwald and Gustav Beer. Left unfinished at the time of Kálmán's death in 1953, the score was completed by his son, Charles Kálmán. The story concerns Lona, a charming Hungarian immigrant, now a rancher. She hires a new ranch foreman, Roy, a cowboy with a questionable past. Roy is reluctant to work for a woman but intrigued by her prize racehorse, Arizona Lady; the two inevitably fall in love, but many complications ensue.

The piece premiered as a broadcast in Munich on 1 January 1954, and on stage in Bern, at the Stadttheater, on 14 February 1954. Arizona Lady's American premiere was directed by Bill Walters, with a new English translation by Gerald Frantzen and Hersh Glagov, by Chicago Folks Operetta in July 2010, at Stage 773 in Chicago, Illinois. Arizona Opera mounted a production in 2015, and Ohio Light Opera performed it several times in the summer of 2023.

== Roles ==
Role	Voice type	Premiere Cast, January 1, 1954 (Conductor: Werner Schmidt-Boelcke )
Lona Farrell	soprano	Esther Réthy
Nelly Nettleton	soprano	Brigitte Mira
Roy Dexter	tenor	Herbert Ernst Groh
Sheriff Harry Sullivan	baritone	Benno Kusche

== Synopsis ==
In 1920s Arizona, a Hungarian woman, Lona Farrell, whose father had emigrated to the US to search for gold, now runs the Sunshine Ranch. She fires her foreman, Jim Slaughter, for having tried to kiss her, and hires a stranger, Roy Dexter from Colorado, despite the concerns of Sheriff Harry Sullivan, who suspects that "Roy Dexter" may actually be the notorious outlaw, Burt Morton. But there is one condition on Roy's employment; he must never even mention the word "love" to Lona; she's had enough of that. Despite that, the sexual tension between Lona and Roy is manifest from the beginning. Roy is reluctant to work for a woman but is intrigued by Lona and her prize racehorse, Arizona Lady.

Arizona Lady is a temperamental filly owned by Lona, and part of the foreman's job is to ride her at the big race in the Arizona State Fair. Roy succeeds in taming Arizona Lady, but is thrown in the race because the girth of his saddle has been cut by Jim Slaughter, who wins the race riding Mexican Cavalier, owned by the wealthy Lopez Ibanez. As a result of a bet on the race, Lona is now engaged to Sheriff Sullivan. At their engagement party, Bonita, a hired dancer from the Paradise Bar, identifies Roy as Burt Morton, and Roy is carted off to jail as news arrives that Arizona Lady has been stolen.

Meanwhile, Nellie Nettleton, proprietor of a mobile general store, meets young Chester Kingsbury Jr., the son of a meat-packing millionaire who has sent him to the Sunshine Ranch to toughen him up. They deal with money troubles and with problems caused by Nellie's sister, Magnolia, who has told her fiancé that her Magnolia's illegitimate baby is really Nellie's.

In jail, Roy meets the drunken vagabond Algernon Galahed Bentschley, who leads him to a tunnel he has dug that leads, not only out of the jail, but across the border into Mexico. They proceed to the Paradise Bar, which straddles the border; on the left side, there is Prohibition, on the right, Mexico and freedom. The Sheriff turns up, and Roy says he will cross the line back into Arizona to surrender to him, but only if he can have ten minutes to speak to Lona alone. He explains that his name truly is not "Roy Dexter"—but it is not "Burt Morton", either. He is really known as the "Colorado Kid", and he has long been pursuing Burt Morton, who killed his father. The Sheriff reenters, and tells Roy that he is free to go, that Jim Slaughter, who was the real Burt Morton, has been arrested, along with Sr. Ibanez, and that Arizona Lady has been recovered. Lona asks Roy to stay, but he says that he wants no payment or reward, but that if there is one thing he wants to take away from the Sunshine Ranch, it is Arizona Lady. She agrees to let the filly go.

Three months later, Lona and her entourage visit Kentucky, where the Derby is about to run. Lona and the Sheriff are not married yet, but they make another bet; if Arizona Lady wins this time, Lona will marry the Sheriff at once. The horse does indeed win, but Sheriff Sullivan, recognizing that Lona is really in love with "Roy", declares that the wedding will go on, with a slight change of bridegroom.
