= Countess Mariza (1932 film) =

1932 film directed by Richard Oswald

- Directed by: Richard Oswald
- Written by: Julius Brammer (libretto); Alfred Grünwald (libretto); Fritz Friedmann-Frederich
- Produced by: Richard Oswald; Gabriel Pascal
- Starring: Dorothea Wieck; Hubert Marischka; Charlotte Ander
- Cinematography: Heinrich Gartner
- Edited by: Max Brenner; Friedel Buckow
- Music by: Emmerich Kálmán (operetta)
- Production company: Roto Film
- Distributed by: Süd-Film
- Release date: 15 September 1932
- Running time: 115 minutes
- Country: Germany
- Language: German

Countess Mariza (German: Gräfin Mariza) is a 1932 German musical film directed by Richard Oswald and starring Dorothea Wieck, Hubert Marischka and Charlotte Ander. It is an Operetta film is based on the operetta Countess Maritza by Emmerich Kálmán, Julius Brammer and Alfred Grünwald.

It was shot at the Tempelhof Studios in Berlin. The film's sets were designed by the art director Franz Schroedter.

== Cast ==
- Dorothea Wieck as Gräfin Mariza
- Hubert Marischka as Török, Gutsverwalter
- Charlotte Ander as Lisa
- Ferdinand von Alten as Fürst Popoff
- Anton Pointner as Baron Liebenberg
- Ernő Verebes as Koloman Zsupan
- S.Z. Sakall as Lampe
- Traute Flamme as Ilka
- Mariette Keglevich as Manja
- Edith Karin as Magd

== Bibliography ==
- Traubner, Richard (2003). Operetta: A Theatrical History. Routledge. ISBN 978-0-415-96641-2.
