= Marbe =

Marbe is a surname. Notable people with this surname include:

- Fay Marbe (1899–1986), American stage actress, singer, and dancer
- Myriam Marbe (1931–1997), Romanian composer and pianist
