= Das Veilchen vom Montmartre =

Operetta in 3 acts by Emmerich Kálmán

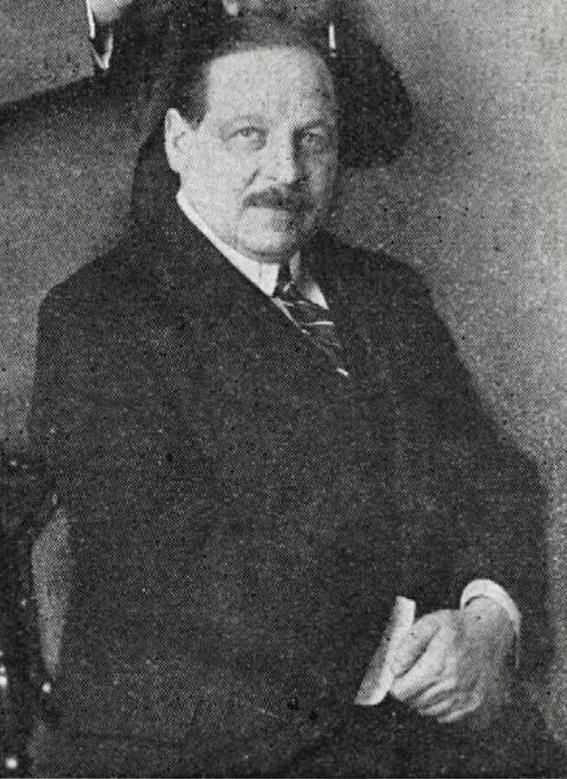
Emmerich Kálmán

Das Veilchen vom Montmartre (The Violet of Montmartre) is an operetta in 3 acts by Hungarian composer Emmerich Kálmán. The libretto was written by Julius Brammer and Alfred Grünwald. It premiered in Vienna at the Johann Strauss Theater on 21 March 1930.

== Roles ==
Roles, voice types, premiere cast
Role	Voice type	Premiere cast, 21 March 1930 Conductor: Josef Holzer
Ninon	soprano	Adele Kern
Pipo de Frascatti	tenor	Richard Waldemar
Raoul Delacroix	lyric tenor	Ernst Tautenhayn
Henri Murger	baritone	Walter Jankuhn
Florimond Hervé	tenor	Robert Nästelberger
Violetta Cavallini	soprano	Anny Ahlers

== A Kiss in Spring ==
For the 1932 performances at the Alhambra Theatre in London the title was changed to A Kiss in Spring and the score was re-worked and supplemented by Herbert Griffiths (who had previously worked on the English adaption of Walzer aus Wien). There were additional orchestrations by a distinguished set of musicians: Constant Lambert, Arthur Wood, Alfred Reynolds and Walford Hyden. The choreography was by Frederick Ashton and the dancers included a young Alicia Markova as well as Harold Turner, Walter Gore and Prudence Hyman.
