= Gräfin Mariza (1958 film) =

1958 film

- Directed by: Rudolf Schündler
- Written by: Julius Brammer; Janne Furch
- Based on: Gräfin Mariza by Emmerich Kálmán, Julius Brammer and Alfred Grünwald
- Produced by: Klaus Stapenhorst; Rudolf Wischert
- Starring: Rudolf Schock; Christine Görner; Gunther Philipp
- Cinematography: Erich Küchler
- Edited by: Adolf Schlyssleder
- Music by: Bruno Uher
- Production company: Carlton Film
- Distributed by: Constantin Film
- Release date: 17 December 1958 (West Germany)
- Running time: 103 minutes
- Country: West Germany
- Language: German

Gräfin Mariza is a 1958 West German musical film directed by Rudolf Schündler and starring Rudolf Schock, Christine Görner, and Gunther Philipp. It is based on the operetta Gräfin Mariza by Emmerich Kálmán, Julius Brammer and Alfred Grünwald. It was shot at the Bendestorf Studios near Hamburg. The film's sets were designed by the art directors Wolf Englert and Ernst Richter.

== Main cast ==
- Rudolf Schock as Michael
- Christine Görner as Gräfin Mariza
- Gunther Philipp as Koloman Zupan
- Renate Ewert as Lisa
- Kurt Großkurth as Dragomir
- Lucie Englisch as Franzi
- Alice Kessler as Ilonka
- Ellen Kessler as Rosika

== Bibliography ==
- Traubner, Richard (2003). Operetta: A Theatrical History. New York: Routledge. ISBN 978-0-415-96641-2.
