= Christine Görner =

German opera singer and actress (1930–2024)

- Görner, c. 1960
- Born: 15 June 1930; Halle (Saale), Prussia, German Reich
- Died: 30 October 2024 (aged 94); Nepi, Italy
- Occupations: Operatic soprano; actress
- Organizations: Staatstheater am Gärtnerplatz
- Spouse: Benno Kusche (1960–1986)
- Children: 1

Christine Görner (German pronunciation: [kʁɪsˈtiːnə ˈɡœʁnɐ]; 15 June 1930 – 30 October 2024) was a German actress and opera singer. Based at the Staatstheater am Gärtnerplatz, she focused on operettas and musicals. She played the title role in the 1958 operetta film Gräfin Mariza.

== Early life and career ==
After her vocal training Görner was engaged as a member of the Staatsoper Hamburg at age 22. After a few years she moved to the Staatstheater am Gärtnerplatz in Munich. She appeared there in Harold Rome's Fanny, alongside Trude Hesterberg, the first musical produced at Gärtnerplatz. In the 1956 world premiere of Paul Burkhard's spieloper Spiegel, das Kätzchen, she performed as Miesmies alongside Ferry Gruber, among others. She performed as a guest at the Cologne Opera, the Deutsche Oper Berlin and the Bavarian State Opera.

In the 1950s she was also active as an actress and performed leading roles in several film productions. In 1958 she played the title role in the operetta film Gräfin Mariza of Kalman's operetta alongside Rudolf Schock.

From 1988 Görner worked mainly as a voice coach, teaching acting and singing, first for five years at the acting school of Ruth von Zerboni, then later in her own studio. She was also successful as a performer of songs by Kurt Weill and Bertolt Brecht as well as of chansons of the 1920s. She appeared on radio and television.

=== Personal life and death ===
Görner was born on 15 June 1930. She was the great-granddaughter of Karl August Görner, an actor and theater manager, and the opera singer Friederike Tomasini from Neustrelitz. Görner was married to the baritone Benno Kusche from 1960 to 1986. Their son, Christian Kusche-Tomasini is a film composer living in Italy.

Görner died on 30 October 2024 in Italy, where she had lived with her son for the last five years. She was 94.

== Recordings ==
Görner recorded complete operettas and excerpts.

- 1957: Gräfin Dubarry
- Excerpts from operettas (Operettenquerschnitte), with Benno Kusche (EMI)
- The Merry Farmer / Der Vogelhändler, with Benno Kusche (Amiga)
- Robert Stolz – Meine schönsten Melodien, with Benno Kusche (Europa)
- Christine Görner – Benno Kusche (Telefunken)
- Weltstars singen Lehár (Electrola)
- Ein Sommer lang / In mir klingt ein Lied (Telefunken)
- J. Strauss: Eine Nacht in Venedig, as Agricola (1967)
- Excerpt from Hochzeitsnacht im Paradies
- Excerpt from Gräfin Mariza, with Fritz Wunderlich
- Excerpt from Wiener Blut
- Excerpt from Der Vetter aus Dingsda

== Films ==
Films with Görner include:

- 1958: Wenn Mädchen ins Manöver zieh'n
- 1958: Mein Mädchen ist ein Postillion
- 1958: Zauber der Montur
- 1958: Gräfin Mariza
- 1959: Zwischen Glück und Krone
- 1959: Was eine Frau im Frühling träumt
- 1959: Mandolinen und Mondschein
- 1959: Immer die Mädchen
- 1959: Mein Schatz, komm mit ans blaue Meer
- 1960: Endstation Rote Laterne
