= Die Herzogin von Chicago =

German-language operetta

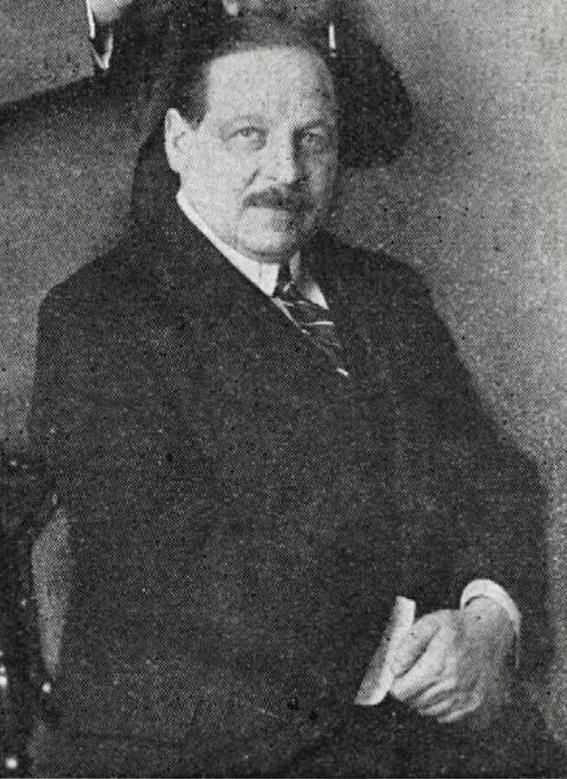
Emmerich Kálmán

Die Herzogin von Chicago (The Duchess of Chicago) is an operetta in two acts, a prologue, and an epilogue. The music was composed by Hungarian composer Emmerich Kálmán with a libretto by Julius Brammer and Alfred Grünwald. It premiered in Vienna at the Theater an der Wien on April 5, 1928, and played for 372 performances. The work was presented in out-of-town tryouts in Newark, New Jersey and Springfield, Massachusetts by the Shuberts in 1929, but it did not make it to Broadway. The piece was forgotten until 1997, when the Lubo Opera Company performed it in concert in New York, after which Light Opera Works of Illinois performed the work in 1998 in a fully staged version with a new translation by Philip Kraus and Gregory Opelka. In 1999, Richard Bonynge made a recording of the work, which revived international interest in it.

The operetta mingles jazz elements and other contemporary dance music with musical elements traditionally associated with Viennese waltz-opera and anticipates such works as White Horse Inn and Paul Abraham's Victoria and Her Hussar. The score also incorporates traditions from Kálmán's native Hungary. The libretto has a relatively modern satirical edge and draws on the political Kabarett that was a feature of radical Vienna, Berlin and Munich at the time. The piece directly addresses the impact of America and its social revolution, with its commentary on current affairs as seen in the jazz scene in Chicago. The piece reveals much about early 20th century European culture and European intellectual attitudes toward Americans, and American culture. The setting and score call for 1920s flapper costumes, jazz and the Charleston.

== Roles ==
Role	Voice type	Premiere cast, April 5, 1928 (Conductor: Anton Paulik)
King Pankraz XXVII of Sylvaria	tenor	Joseph Egger
Prince Sandor Boris, heir to the throne of Sylvaria	lyric tenor	Hubert Marischka
Miss Mary Lloyd, from Chicago	lyric soprano	Rita Georg
James Bondy, Mary Lloyd's secretary	buffo tenor	Richard Waldemar
Princess Rosemarie Sonjuschka, from Morenia	soprano	Elsie Altmann
Mr. Benjamin Lloyd, Mary Lloyd's father	speaking role	
Count Bojazowitsch, Finance minister of Sylvaria	tenor	Hans Moser (actor)
State minister of Sylvaria	tenor	
Countess Dobruja	actress	
Guests, officers, girls, musicians, trumpeters, servants

== Synopsis ==
The story revolves around Miss Mary Lloyd, who makes a bet with her fawning circle of girlfriends, the "Eccentric Young Ladies Club", as to which of them can buy the most expensive thing in Europe, because they are so wealthy that they can buy anything. Meanwhile, back in the bankrupt state of Sylvaria, Prince Sándor Boris and his ministers are trying to keep the natives happy while the king is off to Monte Carlo. Then, as now, there is nothing like a royal wedding to please the locals. The prince makes a marriage pact with his old pal, Princess Rosemarie of Morenia, but there is no love between them.

Mary arrives in Budapest, where she meets who she thinks is the prince, while the real prince has been pretending to be an aide-de-camp. She, of course, prefers the aide, and there is chemistry between them at the nightclub, though the prince prefers Viennese waltzes, and Mary prefers the Charleston. Later, in Sylvaria, Mary arranges to buy the royal palace, and is shocked to learn the true identity of her friend the "aide". She decides that, having bought the palace, she must also have "the prince that goes with it".

Bondy and the prince's promised bride fall in love and, despite themselves, Mary and the prince do so, too, though they still debate the relative merits of their favorite dances. But when the prince reads a letter that Mary wrote to her father, he gets the impression that she is merely buying him, and goes back to his older engagement.

Back in Budapest, we learn that Bondy and Princess Rosemarie have eloped. The King of Sylvaria arrives with two Parisian floozies and tries to romance Mary (Sylvaria needs her money), but she, though amused, is not interested. But everything is saved when an American producer announces that he wants to make a movie about Mary and the prince, but cannot do so until the story has a genuine, American-style happy ending. The two compromise on a slow foxtrot.

== Musical numbers ==
=== Prologue ===
- 1. Introduction (Chorus)
  - Charleston, Charleston tanzt man heut!
- 1a. Stage Music
- 1b. Stage Music (Jazz-Parody)
- 2. Song (Song of Vienna) (Prinz, Officers, Chorus)
  - Verse Das Wienerlied, so süß und weich ist wie ein Gruß von Himmelreich,
  - Refrain Wiener Musik, Wiener Musik, konntest die Welt einst betönen!
- 2a. Stage Music
- 3. Ensemble (Mary, Chorus)
  - Verse Mary, so sprach mein Papa, Mary, wir haben es ja!
  - Refrain Wir Ladies aus Amerika sind auch verliebt so hie und da!
- 4. Finale (Mary, Prinz, Primas, Officers, Chorus)
  - Verse Bobby, jetzt spiel' mir was auf!
  - Verse Ein Wienerlied so süβ und weich ist wie ein Gruß vom Himmelreich
  - Verse Siegreich blieb wieder der Charleston!
  - Refrain Jazz, das ist die Mode, die Methode, immer nur Jazz
  - Verse Hör' ich deine Geige wieder, denk' ich an die alten Lieder,
  - Refrain Das war'n noch Zeiten!

=== Act 1 ===
- 4a. Entr'acte
- 5. Hymn (Chorus)
  - Machtvoll braust der Heimat Lied dir zu Ehren heut'!
- 5a. March Song (Prinz, Children)
  - Verse Herr Erbprinz, wir stellen gehorsamst uns vor!
  - Refrain Wenn die Garde schneidig durch die Stadt marschiert
- 6. Duet (Mary, Bondy)
  - Verse Lichtreklamen, Riesenlettern abends auf- und abwärtsklettern
  - Refrain Und in Chicago, wissen sie, was sich da tut!
- 7. Duet (Rosemarie, Prinz)
  - Verse Wärest du kein Prinzeßchen, ein Mädel aus kleinem Gäβchen
  - Refrain O Rosmarie, o Rosmarie!
- 8. Musical Scene and Duet (Mary, Prinz)
  - Vienna Musik, Vienna Musik!
  - Verse Komm, Prinzchen, komm her, o du gefällst mir, du gefällst mir sehr!
  - Refrain Armer Prinz, armer Prinz, tust mir leid!
- 9. Duet (Rosemarie, Bondy)
  - Verse Wenn ich eine kleine Frau hätt, ach die hätt es wirklich gut.
  - Refrain Ach das wär' fein, Mister Bondy! Das wär' gut, Mister Bondy!
- 10. Finale I (Mary, Prinz, Bondy, Bojazowitsch, Perolin
  - Negresco, Officers, Minister, Chorus)
  - Wie sich's schickt von feinen Leuten

=== Act 2 ===
- 10a. Entr'acte
- 11a. Introduction
- 11b. Song and Dance (Mary)
  - Verse Mary kam vom gold'nen Strande, aus dem fernen Wunderlande
  - Refrain Ein kleiner Slowfox mit Mary bei Cocktail und Sherry, das wär so mein Ideal!
- 12. Duet (Mary, Prinz)
  - Verse Der Walzer ist des Lebens schönste Melodie
  - Refrain Den Walzer hat der Herrgott für Verliebte nur erdacht
- 13. Ensemble (Mary, Friends, Mister Lloyd, Chorus)
  - Refrain Wir Ladies aus der neuen Welt
- 14. Duet (Rosemarie, Bondy)
  - Verse Warum fühl' ich mich so kreuzfidel und so froh
  - Refrain Ja, im Himmel spielt auch schon die Jazzband, alle Englein tanzen Fox!
- 15. Duet (Mary, Prinz)
  - Verse Wenn der Sonne Flammenschein abends am Missouri glüht
  - Refrain Komm in mein kleines Liebesboot, du...Rose der Prairie!
- 16. Finale II (Mary, Friends, Rosemarie, Prinz
  - Bondy, Mister Lloyd, Bojazowitsch
  - Perolin, Officers, Chorus)
  - Seid umschlungen ihr Millionen, heute gibt's noch Sensationen

=== Epilogue ===
- 16a. Entr'acte
- 16b. Introduction (Chorus)
  - Charleston, Charleston tanzt die Welt
- 16c. Reprise (Prinz)
  - Refrain Das war'n noch Zeiten!
  - Refrain Wiener Musik, Wiener Musik, konntest die Welt einst betören...
  - Refrain Komm, in mein kleines Liebesboot, du...Rose der Prairie!
- 17. Duet (Mary, Pankraz)
  - Verse Oh, Majestät, ich bin entzückt
  - Refrain Voulez vous Hoppsassachen, voulez vous mit Papachen
- 18. Final Song (Mary, Prinz, Officers, Chorus)
  - Refrain Ein kleiner Slowfox mit Mary bei Cocktail und Sherry, das wär' so mein Ideal!
