= Her Highness Dances the Waltz (1935 film) =

1935 film directed by Max Neufeld

- Directed by: Max Neufeld
- Written by: Julius Brammer (operetta); Alfred Grünwald (operetta); Max Neufeld
- Produced by: Julius Außenberg
- Starring: Irén Ágay; André Mattoni; Hans Homma
- Cinematography: Willy Goldberger
- Edited by: Jan Kohout; Antonín Zelenka
- Music by: Leo Ascher (operetta)
- Production company: Elektafilm
- Distributed by: Elektafilm; Huschak & Company; Bavaria-film
- Release date: 25 December 1935
- Country: Czechoslovakia
- Language: German
- Budget: 3,000,000 Kčs (for both versisons)

Her Highness Dances the Waltz (German: Hoheit tanzt Walzer) is a 1935 German-language Czech musical comedy film directed by Max Neufeld and starring Irén Ágay, André Mattoni and Hans Homma.

The operetta film is based on the 1912 operetta Hoheit tanzt Walzer by Leo Ascher (music) and Alfred Grünwald (libretto). It was filmed at the Barrandov Studios in Prague. The film's sets were designed by the art director Artur Berger. A French version, Valse éternelle, was released in 1936.

== Cast ==
- Irén Ágay as Princess Marika
- André Mattoni as Prince Georg, Count Hohenaus' son
- Hans Homma as Count Franz von Hohenau
- Anna Kallina as Agnes, Count Hohenau's wife
- Phillis Fehr as Liesl, Count Hohenaus' daughter
- Maria Balcerkiewiczówna as Countess Lubowska
- Teddy Bill
- Alexander Fischer-Marich as Hofer, music copyist
- Hans Jaray as Josef Langer, composer
- Eugen Neufeld
- Camilla Spira

== See also ==
- Her Highness Dances the Waltz (1926)

== Bibliography ==
- Dassanowsky, Robert von. World Film Locations: Vienna. Intellect Books, 2012.
