= The Talk of Hollywood =

1929 film

- Directed by: Mark Sandrich
- Written by: Nat Carr; Mark Sandrich; Darby Aaronson
- Produced by: Samuel Zierler
- Starring: Nat Carr; Fay Marbe; Hope Sutherland
- Cinematography: Walter Strenge
- Edited by: Russell G. Shields
- Music by: Al Goodman
- Production company: Prudence Pictures
- Distributed by: Sono Art-World Wide Pictures
- Release date: December 1, 1929
- Running time: 70 minutes
- Country: United States
- Language: English

The full 1929 movie The Talk of Hollywood

The Talk of Hollywood is a 1929 American musical comedy film directed by Mark Sandrich and starring Nat Carr, Fay Marbe and Hope Sutherland. It was shot at the New York studios of RKO Pictures. The film's sets were designed by the art director Ernst Fegté. The film parodies the rush by Hollywood to convert to sound film production in the late 1920s, and leading moguls such as Samuel Goldwyn.

== Synopsis ==
Following the arrival of talkies, film tycoon J. Pierpont Ginsburg decides to throw all his money and energies into a musical extravaganza and imports a top French star from Paris to appear in it.

== Cast ==
- Nat Carr as J. Pierpont Ginsburg
- Fay Marbe as Adoré Renée
- Hope Sutherland as Ruth Ginsburg
- Sherling Oliver as John Applegate
- Edward LeSaint as Edward Hamilton
- Gilbert Marbe as Reginald Whitlock
- John Troughton as The Butler
- Al Goodman's Orchestra as Al Goodman's Orchestra
- The Leonidoff Ballet as Ballet Troupe

== Production credits ==
The production credits on the film were as follows:

- Mark Sandrich - director and story
- Nat Carr - story
- Darby Aaronson - dialogue
- Frank Melford - production manager
- Harold Godsoe - assistant director
- Frank Kingsley - casting director
- Al Piantadosi - songs and orchestration
- Jack Glogau - songs and orchestration
- George Oschmann - recording engineer
- John Dolan - recording engineer
- Russell G. Shields - editor
- Ernst Fegté - art director
- Walter Strenge - chief cinematographer

== See also ==
- List of early sound feature films (1926–1929)

== Bibliography ==
- Munden, Kenneth White. The American Film Institute Catalog of Motion Pictures Produced in the United States, Part 1. University of California Press, 1997.
