= Elsie Altmann-Loos =

Austrian dancer, actress and autobiographer

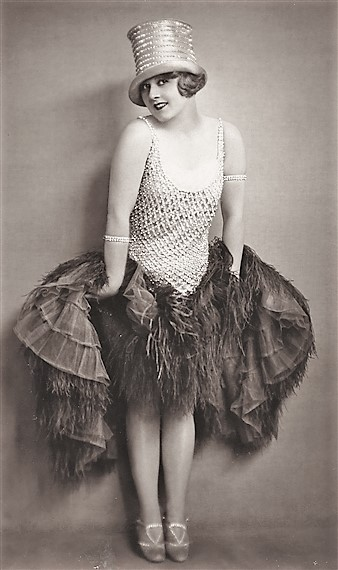
- Born: 27 December 1899
- Died: 19 May 1984 (aged 84)
- Occupations: Dancer, actress and autobiographer

Elsie Altmann-Loos (27 December 1899 - 19 May 1984) was an Austrian dancer, actress and autobiographer.

== Biography ==
Altmann's debut concert was in 1919. Later that year she became the second wife of modernist architect Adolf Loos, who was 29 years older than her. Elsie Altmann starred as Lisa in the original production of Emmerich Kálmán’s operetta Gräfin Mariza at Theater an der Wien in 1924. A photograph of her by Madame D'Ora was used to advertise the operetta. Altmann's dance "projected [an] image of cheerfulness, reinforced by an elegant taste for Biedermeyer-style costumes".

Elsie Altmann later recalled some of the strain of her relationship with Loos, who would be imprisoned for child abuse in 1928:

I have always been a woman-child and this is what Loos loved in me. But all of a sudden, he finds that I don’t have sex appeal, and moreover, that my legs are too short. If I had longer legs, he said, it would change my life. So Loos decided to take me to a surgeon who would break my two legs and elongate them

The pair divorced in 1926. Altmann continued her professional connection with Kálmán, playing Princess Rosemarie Sonjuschka Die Herzogin von Chicago, which premiered at Theater an der Wien in 1928.

With the rise of Hitler, Altmann went into exile in Argentina. Adolf Loos died in 1933. Under a 1922 will, she was Loos's sole heir, and his estate was released to her in 1938.

== Selected works ==
- Adolf Loos, der Mensch [Alfred Loos, the man], 1968
- Mein Leben mit Adolf Loos [My life with Adolf Loos], 1984
