= Sehradice =

- Municipality
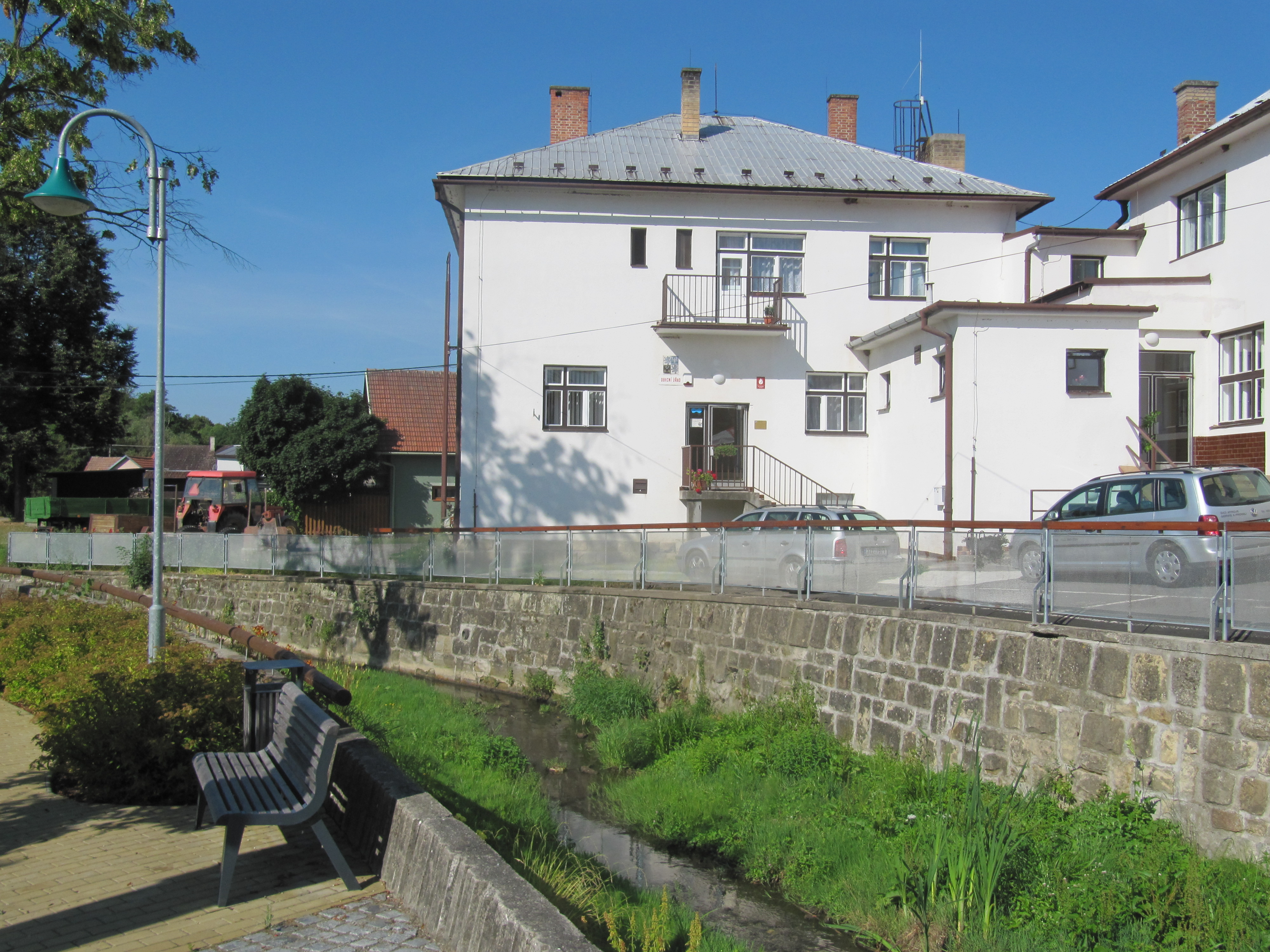
- Municipal office

- Flag Coat of arms

- Location in the Czech Republic
- Coordinates: 49°8′39″N 17°49′27″E
- Country: Czech Republic
- Region: Zlín
- District: Zlín
- First mentioned: 1261

Area
  - Total: 9.05 km^{2} (3.49 sq mi)
- Elevation: 316 m (1,037 ft)

Population (2026-01-01)
  - Total: 652
  - Density: 72.0/km^{2} (187/sq mi)
- Time zone: UTC+1 (CET)
  - Summer (DST): UTC+2 (CEST)
- Postal code: 763 23
- Website: www.sehradice.cz

Sehradice is a municipality and village in Zlín District in the Zlín Region of the Czech Republic. It has about 700 inhabitants.

Sehradice lies approximately 16 kilometres (10 mi) south-east of Zlín and 268 km (167 mi) south-east of Prague.

== Demographics ==
Historical population
Year	Pop.	±%
1869	527	—
1880	567	+7.6%
1890	590	+4.1%
1900	548	−7.1%
1910	591	+7.8%
1921	573	−3.0%
1930	592	+3.3%
1950	634	+7.1%
1961	737	+16.2%
1970	700	−5.0%
1980	720	+2.9%
1991	750	+4.2%
2001	745	−0.7%
2011	705	−5.4%
2021	637	−9.6%
Source: Censuses

== Notable people ==
- Julius Brammer (1877–1943), Austrian librettist and lyricist
