= Vera Kálmán =

Russian-born actress and memoirist (1907–1999)

Vera Kálmán (born Marya Mendelsons) was a Russian actress. She was born on August 22, 1907, in Perm, Russia to a Jewish merchant family. After the Russian Revolution, the family fled to Western Europe. Vera married the operetta composer Emmerich Kálmán, with whom she had a son Charles Kálmán, who also became a composer.

As an actress, she is known for her roles in Paris aktuell (1966), Zwischenmahlzeit (1963) and V.I.P.-Schaukel (1971). She also played an extra in Fritz Lang's silent classic Metropolis. She published several books recounting her life and marriage with Kalman, among them:

- Grüß’ mir die süßen, die reizenden Frauen. Mein Leben mit Emmerich Kálmán. Hestia-Verlag, Bayreuth 1966
- Die Welt ist mein Zuhause. Erinnerungen. Langen-Müller, München 1980, ISBN 3-8004-0891-0
- Csárdás. Der Tanz meines Lebens. Ullstein, Frankfurt/M. 1988, ISBN 3-548-20863-0

She died on November 25, 1999, in Zürich, Switzerland.
