= Die Zirkusprinzessin =

Opera by Emmerich Kálmán

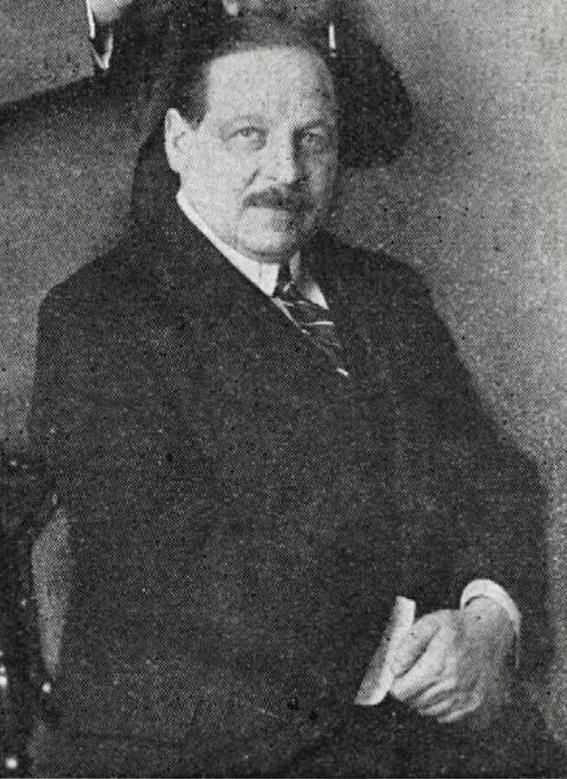
Emmerich Kálmán

Die Zirkusprinzessin (The Circus Princess) is an operetta in three acts by Hungarian composer Emmerich Kálmán to a German libretto by Julius Brammer and Alfred Grünwald. It premiered at the Theater an der Wien in Vienna on 26 March 1926 and went on to 344 performances there.

== Synopsis ==
The plot revolves around a romantic intrigue with interpolated circus sequences. The mysterious "Mister X", a dashing circus performer, is hired by a disappointed suitor of Princess Fedora Palinska to pose as a nobleman and marry her. "Mister X" is in fact a nobleman, the disinherited nephew of a deceased prince. One of the work's most well-known arias, Zwei Märchenaugen (Two fairy-tale eyes), has been recorded by several famous tenors, including Fritz Wunderlich, Charles Kullman, and Richard Tauber.

== International productions ==
The operetta was swiftly performed in Hungary, in an adaptation by Ernő Kulinyi and Imre Liptai, at the Király Színház in Budapest, on 24 September 1926. Productions in Sweden (Stockholm, Vasa-Teatern, October 6, 1926); Germany (Hamburg, Operetten-Teater, October 17, 1926), and - as Mister X - in Russia (Moscow, November 23, 1926). There were also productions during 1926 in Czechoslovakia, Italy, Finland and Poland.

An English language version, The Circus Princess, adapted by Harry B. Smith - first seen at the Apollo Theatre, Atlantic City, on April 4, 1927 - enjoyed a successful run at the Winter Garden Theatre in New York City from 25 April 1927 starring Guy Robertson, Desiree Tabor, and Robert O'Connor. The circus sequences in the American production were particularly lavish, including equestrians, aerialists, and a famous clown of the day, Poodles Hanneford. The show was staged by J. C. Huffman.

== Roles ==
Role	Voice type	Premiere cast, 26 March 1926 (Conductor: – )
Fedja Palinski, Mr X	tenor	Hubert Marischka
Princess Fedora Palinska	soprano	Mizzi Zwerenz
Miss Mabel Gibson	soprano	Elsie Altmann
Toni Schlumberger	tenor	Fritz Steiner
Prinz Sergius Wladimir	baritone	Richard Waldemar
Count Sakusin		
Lieutenant Petrovitsch		
Director Stanislawski	bass	Hans Moser (actor)
Carla Schlumberger, hotel manager	contralto	Betty Fischer
Samuel Pressburger		
Society, officers, circus people – chorus

== Recordings ==
- Emmerich Kálmán: Die Zirkusprinzessin – Margit Schramm (soprano), Guggi Löwinger (soprano), Julius Katona (tenor), Rudolf Schock (tenor), Ferry Gruber (tenor); Deutsche Oper Berlin (chorus); Berliner Symphoniker (orchestra); Robert Stolz (conductor), Label: Eurodisc.

== Films ==
Several Zirkusprinzessin films have been made, including The Circus Princess in 1925, Mister X in 1958 and The Circus Princess in 1982.

== Notes and references ==
- Casaglia, Gherardo (2005)."Die Zirkusprinzessin, 26 March 1926". L'Almanacco di Gherardo Casaglia (in Italian).
- Martin, Jessie Wright (2005) A Survey of the Operettas of Emmerich Kalman, PhD. Thesis: Louisiana State University, August 2005.
- Naxos Records, Liner Notes, The Best of Operetta Vol. 2.
- Smith, Cecil (1981) Musical Comedy in America: From the Black Crook Through Sweeney Todd Routledge. ISBN 0-87830-564-5
- Traubner, Richard (2003) Operetta: A Theatrical History, Routledge. ISBN 0-415-96641-8
