= King of the Centre Forwards =

1927 film

- Directed by: Fritz Freisler
- Written by: Hugo Huxhol; Kurt Lauermann
- Starring: Paul Richter; Fritz Alberti; Colette Brettel
- Cinematography: Günther Krampf; Artur von Schwertführer
- Music by: Hans May
- Production company: Olympia Film
- Distributed by: Bavaria Film
- Release date: 24 November 1927
- Running time: 95 minutes
- Country: Germany
- Languages: Silent; German intertitles

King of the Centre Forwards (German: Der König der Mittelstürmer) is a 1927 German silent sports film directed by Fritz Freisler and starring Paul Richter, Fritz Alberti and Colette Brettel.

The film's sets were designed by Bruno Lutz and Franz Seemann.

== Cast ==
- Paul Richter as Tull Harper - ein Fussballspieler
- Fritz Alberti as Konsul Harper - Tulls Vater
- Colette Brettel as Margit Harper - seine Tochter
- Aud Egede-Nissen as Miss Mabel Douglas
- Rudolf Lettinger as Jakob Meeling
- Carl Walther Meyer as Claus Meeling, sein Sohn
- Teddy Bill as Mr. Jonas
- Gustav Trautschold

== Bibliography ==
- Kaes, Anton. Shell Shock Cinema: Weimar Culture and the Wounds of War. Princeton University Press, 2009.
