= Bürgertheater =

Former theatre in Vienna, Austria

Coordinates: 48.207°N 16.383°E

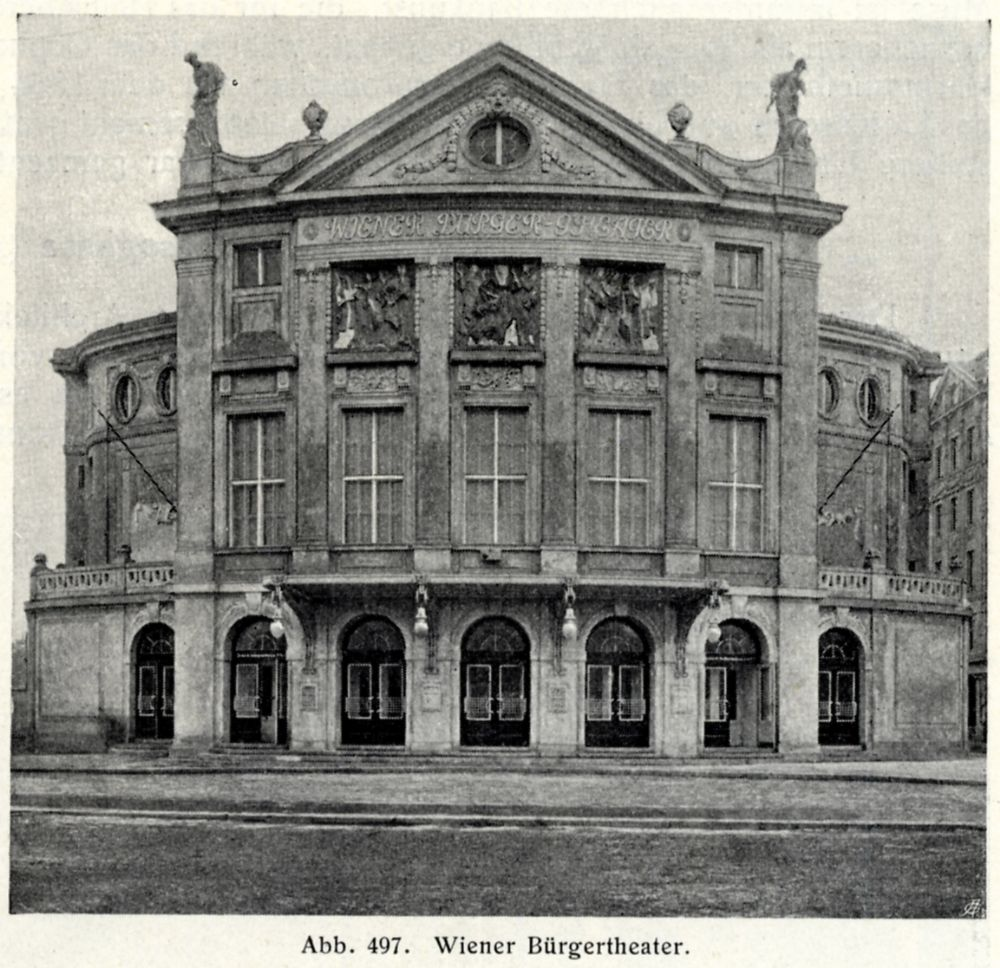
Bürgertheater

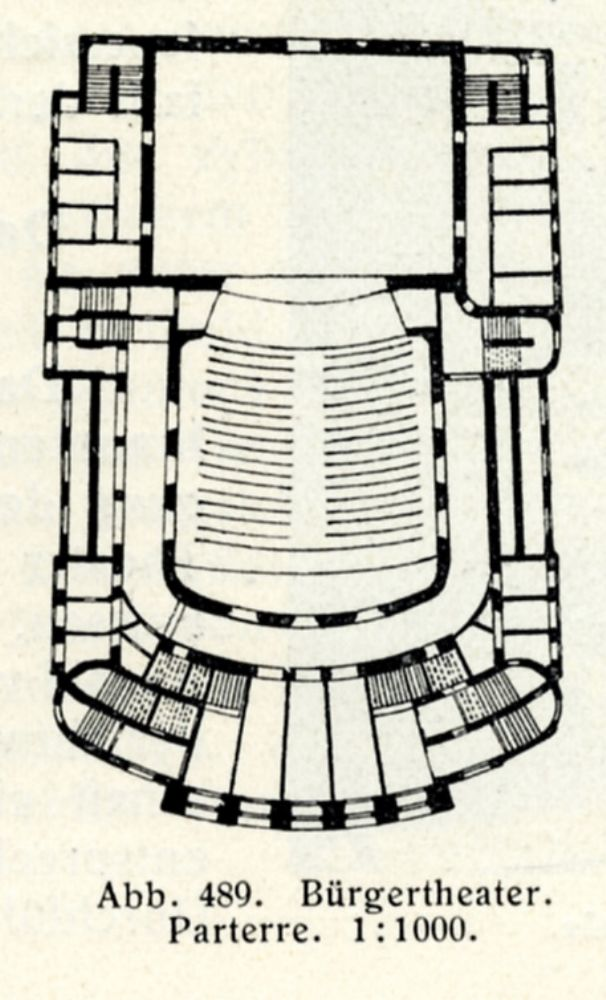
Interior plan of the theatre

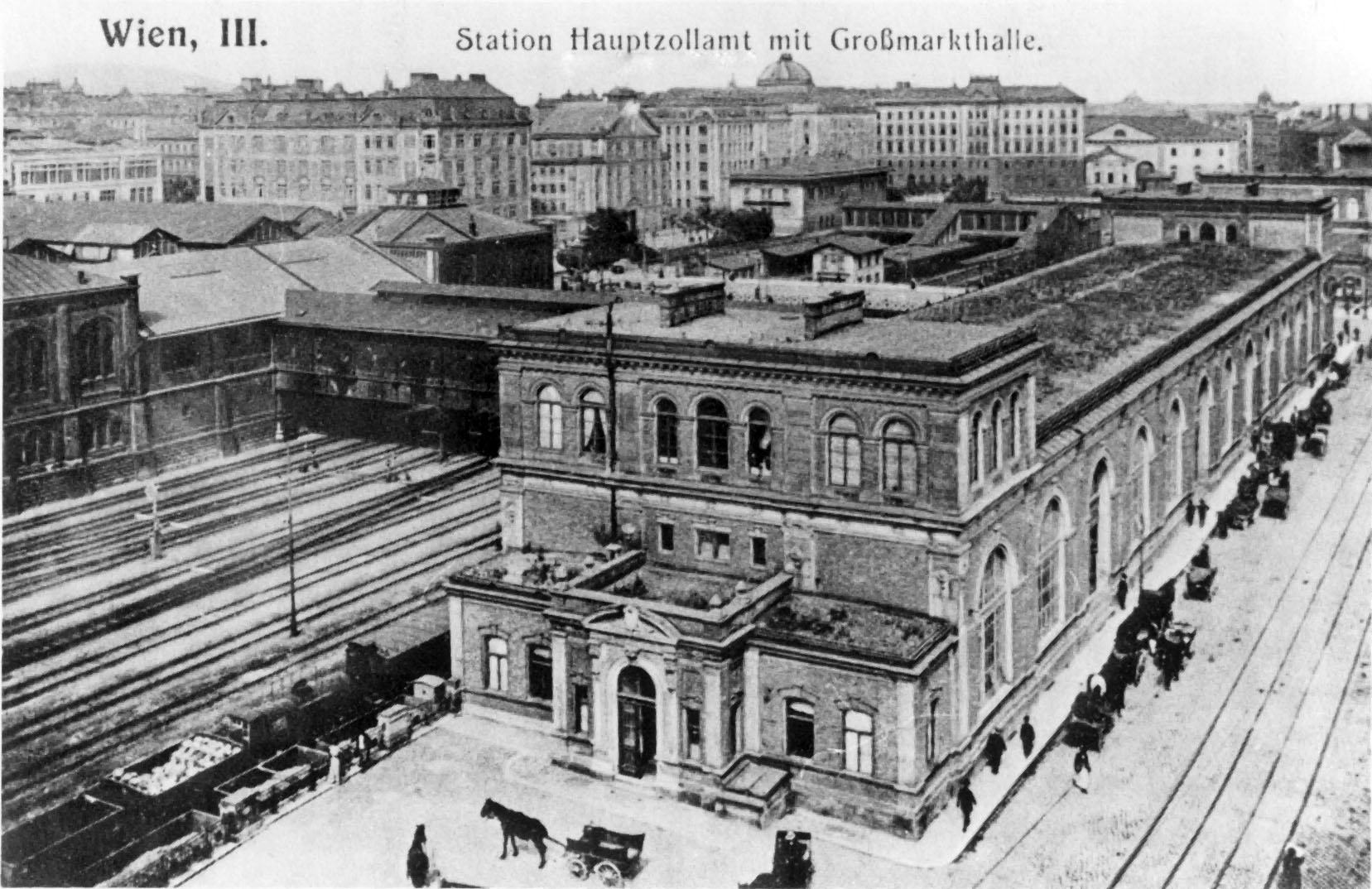
Overhead view

The Bürgertheater was a theatre in Vienna.

The Wiener Bürgertheater was erected in 1905 in the Third District (3 Bezirk), at Vordere Zollamtsstraße 13. It was designed by the architects Franz von Krauss and Josef Tölk. The official opening took place on December 7, 1905, with the performance of Der alte Herr (The Old Man), by Beatrice Dvorsky with the mayor of Vienna, Karl Lueger, attending.

The first director was actor and author Oskar Fronz, who managed the theatre until his death in 1925. The venue was unsuccessful in its early years until Fronz adapted the Bürgertheater for operetta performances in 1910 and Edmund Eysler became the house composer. From 1926, Revue-operettas were common, particularly those featuring Karl Farkas and his partner, Fritz Grünbaum. The theatre closed in the early years of World War II, but reopened under the direction of Robert Valberg in 1942.

In September 1945, Franz Stoss was named director, and the Bürgertheater became a satellite theatre of the Theater in der Josefstadt. In 1953, Stoss was followed by Harald Röbbeling who renamed the Bürgertheater Broadwaybühne (Broadway-stage) in an attempt to give it a new direction. This was unsuccessful causing huge financial losses that forced the theatre to close. The building was subsequently used for, among other purposes, the transmission hub for the American occupying force and a sales exhibition which was previously housed at the Vienna Stock Exchange.

During the 1959–1961 "great death of the theatres" in Vienna—in which the Wiener Stadttheater (in Laudongasse) and the "Scala", the former Johann Strauss Theater, were also affected—the Bürgertheater was demolished in 1960. The headquarters of the Viennese Zentralsparkasse was erected on the site, with a bridge over the adjoining slip road, designed by Arthur Perotti and Anton Potyka.

== Premieres ==
- Der unsterbliche Lump by Edmund Eysler, 15 October 1910
- Der gute Kamerad by Emmerich Kálmán, 27 October 1911
- Der Frauenfresser by Edmund Eysler, 23 December 1911
- Der lachende Ehemann by Edmund Eysler, 19 March 1913
- Ein Tag im Paradies by Edmund Eysler, 23 December 1913
- Frühling am Rhein by Edmund Eysler, 10 October 1914
- Die -- oder keine by Edmund Eysler, 9 October 1915
- Der berühmte Gabriel by Edmund Eysler, 8 November 1916
- Der dunkle Schatz by Edmund Eysler, 14 November 1918
- Der fidele Geiger by Edmund Eysler, 17 January 1919
- Der ledige Schwiegersohn by Edmund Eysler, 20 April 1923
- Clo-Clo by Franz Lehár, 6 March 1924
- Das Land der Liebe by Edmund Eysler, 27 August 1926
- Ihr erster Ball by Edmund Eysler, 21 November 1929
- Donauliebchen by Edmund Eysler, 25 December 1932
- Wiener Musik by Edmund Eysler, 22 December 1947

== Bibliography ==
- Dieter Klein, Martin Kupf, Robert Schediwy, Stadtbildverluste Wien - Ein Rückblick auf fünf Jahrzehnte (Image loss in the city of Vienna - a retrospection through five decades). Vienna, 2005 ISBN 3-8258-7754-X

== Sources ==
Most of the information in this article is taken from the German Wikipedia article.
