= Countess Maritza =

Operetta

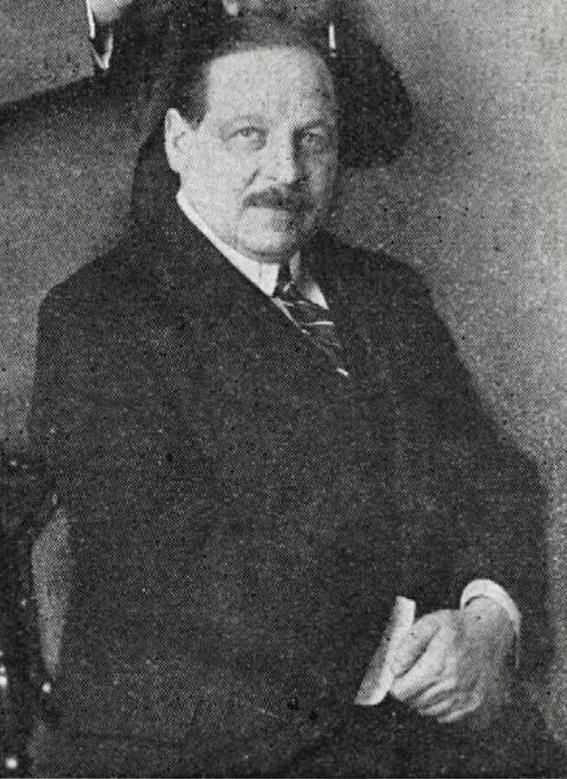
Emmerich Kálmán

Gräfin Mariza (German pronunciation: [ˈɡʁɛːfɪn ˈmaʁitsa]; Countess Maritza) is an operetta in three acts composed by Hungarian composer Emmerich Kálmán, with a German libretto by Julius Brammer and Alfred Grünwald. It premiered in Vienna on 28 February 1924 at the Theater an der Wien.

== English adaptations ==
As Countess Maritza, it made its New York City debut on 18 September 1926 at the Shubert Theatre, in an adaptation by Harry B. Smith, and with interpolated music by other composers, playing 318 performances, with Yvonne d'Arle in the title role on opening night. The show was staged by J. C. Huffman.

As Maritza, it opened in London at the Palace Theatre on 6 July 1938, with Mary Losseff in the title role.

A London revival by New Sadler's Wells Opera opened at Sadler's Wells Theatre in February 1983, with a new English book and lyrics by Nigel Douglas, starring Marilyn Hill Smith (Maritza), Ramon Remedios (Tassilo), Laureen Livingstone (Lisa), Lynn Barber (Manja) and Tudor Davies (Zsupan), with Osmund Bullock as Penizek and Baron Liebenberg, conducted by Barry Wordsworth.

== Roles ==
Role	Voice type	Premiere Cast, 28 February 1924 (Conductor: Anton Paulik)
Countess Mariza	soprano	Betty Fischer
Prince Populescu	baritone	Richard Waldemar
Baron Kolomán Zsupán, landowner of Varaždin	tenor	Max Hansen
Count Tassilo of Endrödy-Wittemburg	tenor	Hubert Marischka
Lisa, Tassilo's sister	soprano	Elsie Altmann
Karl Stefan Liebenberg	bass	
Princess Božena Guddenstein zu Clumetz	contralto	Mizzi Gribl
Penižek, her valet	spoken	Hans Moser
Tschekko, an old butler of Mariza's		
Berko, a gypsy		
Manja, a young gypsy	soprano	
Village children, guests, dancers, gypsies, peasant boys and peasant girls

== Synopsis ==
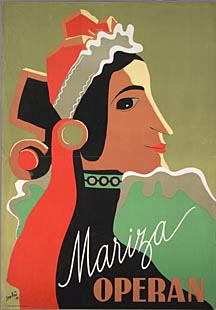
Poster for a 1941 Stockholm production.

Place: Hungary: the manor and estate of the Countess Maritza
Time: Around 1920.

Manja the gypsy girl flirts with the newly appointed bailiff, Béla Törek. Unknown to anyone, Törek is in fact the impoverished Count Tassilo, who is seeking to earn a living and set aside some cash for the dowry of his sister Lisa. The Countess Maritza, a young widow, unexpectedly arrives at the estate to celebrate her engagement. This 'engagement' is however quite fictitious, an invention intended to put off her numerous followers. The name she has chosen for her suitor, based on her recollection of Strauss' operetta, The Gypsy Baron, is Baron Koloman Zsupán. However, amongst Maritza's guests, to Tassilo's horror, is Lisa, whom he instructs to keep their relationship and his identity strictly secret. Maritza is also embarrassed when a genuine Koloman Zsupán materialises, having seen an announcement of his 'engagement' in the press.

Tassilo is heard by the guests singing an air "Komm, Zigány" ("Come, gypsies!"), which he ends with a czardas. Maritza orders him to repeat it; he refuses, and the angry countess announces that he is fired. Manja predicts that The Countess will be very happy in love. "One moon will pass over this Earth and Maritza will find her happiness", she sings. Maritza therefore decides to remain on her estate. She stops Tassilo from leaving and apologises.

Zsupan has meanwhile decided that he prefers Lisa to Maritza, whilst Maritza is increasingly attracted to Tassilo. However, the ageing Lothario Populescu reveals to Maritza Tassilo's identity, and moreover alleges that Lisa is his girlfriend. Maritza in a high temper insults Tassilo, who declares that he will leave. However, before he goes, the repentant Maritza writes him a 'reference' which is in fact a proposal of marriage. The operetta ends with Maritza and Tassilo, and Zsupan and Lisa, engaged.

== Recordings ==
Kalman: Gräfin Mariza, Wiener Opernball Orch.

- Conductor: Uwe Theimer
- Principal singers: Izabela Labuda (Mariza), Martina Dorak (Lisa), Ryszard Karczykowski (Tassilo), Moritz Gogg (Zsupán)
- Recording date:
- Label: Camarata, CD CM 660-1

Kalman: Countess Maritza, New Sadler's Wells Opera

- Conductor: Barry Wordsworth
- Principal singers: Marilyn Hill Smith (Maritza), Ramon Remedios (Tassilo), Laureen Livingstone (Lisa), Tudor Davies (Zsupán)
- Recording date: 3 & 4 March 1983 (EMI Abbey Road Studios, London)
- Label: That's Entertainment Records TER 1051

== Films ==
Countess Maritza (1925)

There are a number of film versions of the operetta:

- A silent version in 1925, directed by Hans Steinhoff with Harry Liedtke as Tassilo, Vivian Gibson as Mariza and Ernő Verebes as Zsupán.
- Gräfin Mariza (1932), directed by Richard Oswald with Dorothea Wieck, Hubert Marischka, Charlotte Ander (Lisa), Ferdinand von Alten (Fürst Popoff), Anton Pointner (Baron Liebenberg) and Ernő Verebes (Baron Kolomán Zsupán)
- Gräfin Mariza (1958), directed by Rudolf Schündler with Christine Görner and Rudolf Schock, Gunther Philipp, Hans Moser, Lucie Englisch, Renate Ewert and the Kessler Twins
- Gräfin Mariza (1974), directed by Eugen York with Ljuba Welitsch and René Kollo.
- Maritsa (1985 television film), directed by Alexander Belinsky with Natalya Andrejchenko, Timofey Spivak, Vera Sotnikova and Igor Sklyar.

== Other sources ==
- Casaglia, Gherardo (2005)."Gräfin Mariza, 28 February 1928". L'Almanacco di Gherardo Casaglia (in Italian).
- Lamb, Andrew (1992), 'Gräfin Mariza' in The New Grove Dictionary of Opera, ed. Stanley Sadie (London), ISBN 0-333-73432-7
