= Love Story (1925 film) =

1925 film

- Directed by: Fritz Freisler
- Written by: Robert Liebmann
- Produced by: Hanns Lippmann
- Starring: Olga Chekhova; Hans Unterkircher; Claire Rommer
- Cinematography: Ewald Daub; Eduard von Borsody
- Production company: Gloria-Film
- Distributed by: UFA
- Release date: 5 November 1925
- Country: Germany
- Languages: Silent; German intertitles

Love Story (German: Liebesgeschichten) is a 1925 German silent film directed by Fritz Freisler and starring Olga Chekhova, Hans Unterkircher and Claire Rommer.

The film's sets were designed by the art director Hermann Warm.

== Cast ==
- Olga Chekhova as Lilli, das Verhältnis
- Hans Unterkircher as Rudi Schönau, der "Unwiderstehliche" Hans
- Claire Rommer as Steffi, das "süße Mädel"
- Minna Jaida as Steffis Tante
- Karl Platen as Anton Reichelt, Buchhändler
- Richard Starnburg as Onkel Theobald
- Hans Thimig

== Bibliography ==
- Hans-Michael Bock & Michael Töteberg. Das Ufa-Buch. Zweitausendeins, 1992.
