= Die Bajadere (operetta) =

Opera by Emmerich Kálmán

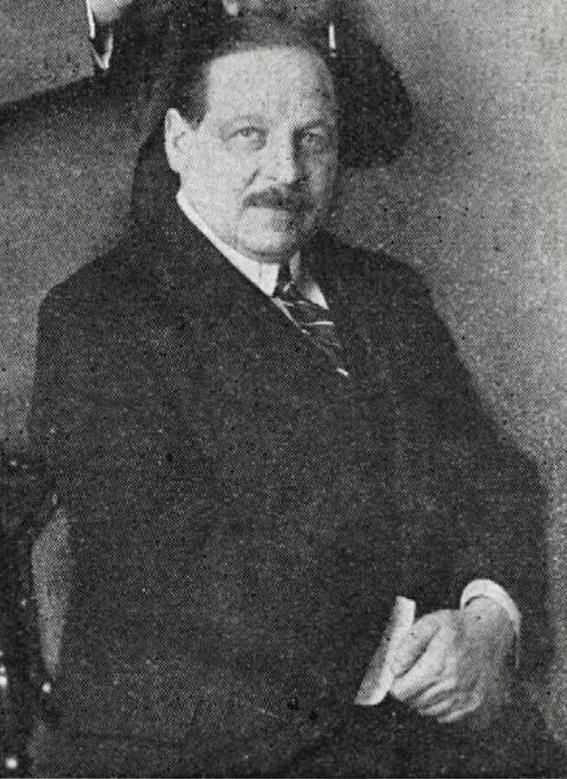
Emmerich Kálmán

Die Bajadere is an operetta in 3 acts composed by Hungarian composer Emmerich Kálmán. The libretto was written by Julius Brammer and Alfred Grünwald. The work premiered in Vienna at the Carltheater on 23 December 1921. With the English-language title of The Yankee Princess, the work received its first New York City performances in October 1922; using a significantly different English language libretto by William LeBaron.

== Roles ==
Role	Voice type	Premiere Cast, 23 December 1921 (Conductor: - )
Mariette	soprano	Louise Kartousch
Napoleon St. Cloche	tenor	Ernst Tautenhayn
Odette Darimonde	soprano	Christl Mardayn
Philippe Louis La Tourette	bass	
Prince Radjami	tenor	Louis Treumann

== Synopsis ==
The operetta is set in 1921.

=== Act 1 ===
Act One begins after a performance in Paris by the great singing actress, Odette Darimonde, who is starring at the Châtelet in the operetta La Bayadère. After witnessing many of her performances, the young Indian Prince Radjami von Lahore has fallen helplessly in love and asks the theater manager to arrange an introduction. He is anxious to make her his bride immediately, for his parents have an arranged marriage waiting for him back home. Odette makes it clear to him, however, that she has no interest in him. Radjami engages the help of a young man, Napoleon St. Cloche, to assist him in his cause. Napoleon has his own worries as he is trying to seduce a young married lady, Marietta, to whom he brags of world travels, tiger hunting in India, and, in fact, his acquaintance with the Prince. The Prince again expresses his love to Odette, hypnotising her with roses, and begs her to marry him. At an impromptu party he is throwing at his palace, she appears with roses in hand and seemingly under his spell.

=== Act 2 ===
Act Two takes place in the Parisian palace of the Prince. At the party, Radjami tells Odette that before the night is over, she will succumb to his advances, all this as she is teaching him to waltz. Fully intent on a wedding that evening, Radjami calls on his "friend" Napoleon to be a witness, so impressing Marietta that she agrees to divorce her husband, Louis-Philipp, and wed her persistent suitor. As the ceremony uniting Radjami and Odette proceeds, she awakens from her trance, mocks his arrogance in assuming that she would ever be his, and leaves him humiliated. The act ends as he promises all that she will indeed love him some day.

=== Act 3 ===
Act Three takes place at a little bar in Paris. Marietta and Napoleon are now married, but she has learned of his exaggerations and now finds him as boring as Louis-Philipp, who appears smartly dressed and newly appointed by Radjami as counsel to India. Napoleon, who is just as bored with Marietta as she with him, tells Louis-Philipp that he can have her back. Radjami engages Pimprinette, the theater claque leader, to help him stage a scene whereby it appears as if Radjami has returned to India. Odette is grief-stricken. Radjami appears, assured finally of her love, as she falls into his arms.

== Selected recordings ==
- Newport Classics (title: The Bayadere, New English Version): Eric Fennell, Buck Hujabre, Susan Miller, John Pickle, Julie Wright; Ohio Light Opera Orchestra and Chorus, c. J. Lynn Thompson. (rec. 1998) (2-CD set in English)
- CPO: Heike Susanne Daum, Rainer Trost, Anke Vondung, Stephan Genz, Miljenko Turk, Christian Sturm, Dirk Schmitz, Ulrich Hielscher, Yvonne Kálman; WDR Rundfunkchor Köln, WDR Funkhausorchester Köln, c. Richard Bonynge. (rec. 2014) (2-CD set, in German)
