= Her Highness Dances the Waltz (1926 film) =

1926 film

- Directed by: Fritz Freisler
- Written by: Julius Brammer (operetta); Alfred Grünwald (operetta); Jacques Bachrach; Fritz Freisler
- Starring: Claire Rommer; Magda Karmen; Walter Rilla
- Cinematography: Eduard Hoesch
- Production companies: Allianz-Film; Domo-Strauß-Film
- Distributed by: Allianz-Film; Domo-Strauß-Film
- Release date: 1926
- Country: Austria
- Languages: Silent; German intertitles

Her Highness Dances the Waltz (German: Hoheit tanzt Walzer) is a 1926 Austrian silent romance film directed by Fritz Freisler and starring Claire Rommer, Magda Karmen and Walter Rilla. The operetta film is based on the 1912 operetta Hoheit tanzt Walzer by Leo Ascher (music) and Alfred Grünwald (libretto).

== Cast ==
- Claire Rommer
- Magda Karmen
- Walter Rilla
- Eugen Neufeld
- Pauline Schweighofer
- Gisela Günther
- Lilian Gray
- Gyula Szőreghy
- Albert Paulig

== See also ==
- Her Highness Dances the Waltz (1935)

== Bibliography ==
- Alfred Krautz. International Directory of Cinematographers, Set- and Costume Designers in Film, Volume 4. Saur, 1984.
