= The Circus Princess (1929 film) =

1929 film

- Dutch theatrical release poster
- Directed by: Victor Janson
- Written by: Jane Bess; Walter Reisch; Julius Brammer (libretto); Alfred Grünwald (libretto)
- Cinematography: Edoardo Lamberti; Guido Seeber
- Music by: Hansheinrich Dransmann
- Production company: Aafa-Film
- Distributed by: Aafa-Film
- Release date: 8 March 1929
- Country: Germany
- Languages: Silent; German intertitles

The Circus Princess (German: Die Zirkusprinzessin) is a 1929 German silent film directed by Victor Janson. It is an adaptation of the operetta Die Zirkusprinzessin. It was shot at the Staaken Studios in Berlin. The film's sets were designed by the art directors Botho Hoefer and Hans Minzloff.

== Cast ==
In alphabetical order

- Trude Berliner
- Hugh Douglas
- Fritz Eckert
- Cilly Feindt
- Hans Junkermann
- Fritz Kampers
- Harry Liedtke
- Alexander Murski
- Hermann Picha
- Lydia Potechina
- Hilda Rosch
- Adele Sandrock
- Ernő Verebes
- Marianne Winkelstern

== Bibliography ==
- Gänzl, Kurt; Lamb, Andrew (1989). Gänzl's Book of the Musical Theatre. New York: Schirmer Books. ISBN 978-0-02-871941-2.
