= Fay Marbe =

American stage actress, singer, and dancer (1899–1986)

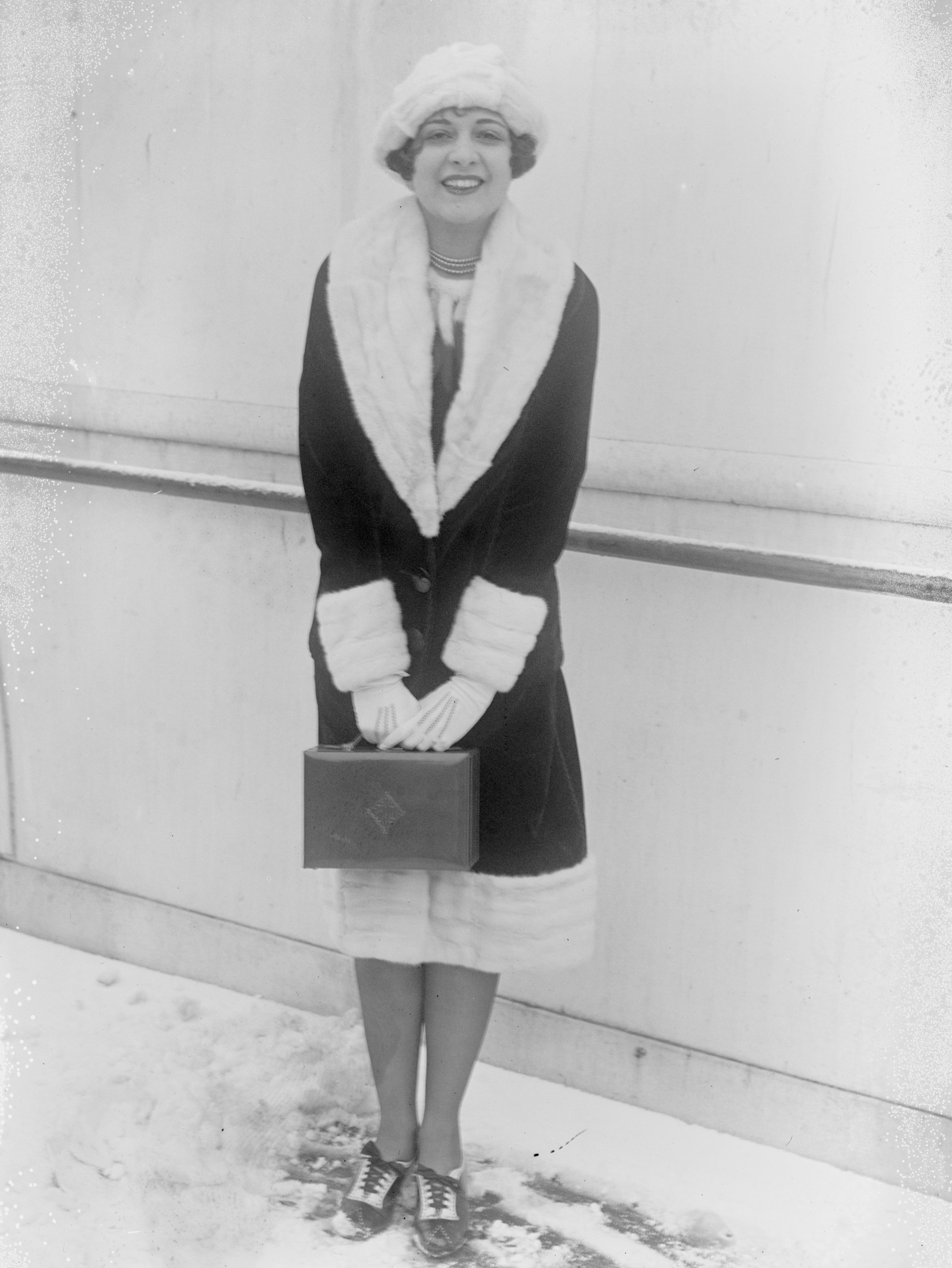
- Born: Fay Dora Marbe; February 4, 1899; New York City, United States
- Died: June 2, 1986 (aged 87); Fairfield, Connecticut, United States
- Occupations: Actress, singer, dancer
- Years active: 1917–1931

Fay Dora Marbe (February 4, 1899 – June 2, 1986) was an American vaudeville and stage actress, singer and dancer.

== Life and career ==
Marbe was born in New York City, the daughter of William Marbe, a German immigrant and merchant, who died under the wheels of a subway train in 1923. In interviews, Fay Marbe claimed that her family were part of "high society" in New York, and friends to the Astors and Caruso.

Fay Marbe entered show business as second lead dancer in Jerome Kern's Oh, Boy! in 1917, after producer William Elliott saw her performing at a charity event. She performed with Janette Hackett in a show built around Nora Bayes, but soon became a star in her own right as "a fine singer and dancer", noted for her physical attractiveness. She quickly became the focus of much publicity. She featured in the successful shows The Velvet Lady and The Magic Melody in 1919, and performed in Hollywood as a dancer in the film The Very Idea the following year. A critic in The New York Dramatic Mirror wrote:

Miss Marbe has youth – is fairly alive with it and as she has a comely face and an attractive figure and knows just the kind of stage outfits to wear to catch both the masculine and feminine eyes, the answer is all in her favor. And how she works! A butterfly of kaleidoscopic colors one minute and a whirling, graceful exponent of the art of terpsichore the next. It is a treat.

In the early 1920s, she appeared on Broadway in The Hotel Mouse in 1922, and Topics of 1923 the following year. She then travelled to Europe, and appeared on stage in London, and in several films in Germany, including Fritz Freisler's 1928 silent film Dorine und der Zufall. On her return to the U.S., she appeared in the 1929 comedy The Talk of Hollywood with her brother Gilbert, with whom she had previously danced in vaudeville.

By 1930, none of her films had been successful, and her attempts to launch herself as a cabaret performer also failed. She retired from performance soon afterwards.

Little is known of her later life. She lived in New York before moving to Fairfield, Connecticut, where she died in 1986 at the age of 87.
