= The Circus Princess (1982 film) =

- Directed by: Svetlana Druzhinina
- Starring: Igor Keblusek; Natalya Belokhvostikova; Nikolay Trofimov
- Music by: Emmerich Kálmán
- Country of origin: Soviet Union
- Original language: Russian

Production
- Cinematography: Anatoly Mukasei
- Running time: 148 minutes
- Production company: Mosfilm

Original release
- Release: 1982

The Circus Princess (Russian: Принцесса цирка, romanized: Printsessa tsirka) is 1982 Soviet musical comedy, a screen version of the operetta of the same name (1926) by Emmerich Kálmán.

== Plot ==
A circus comes to the city, the main star of which is an air gymnast, performing dizzying stunts - the mysterious Mr. X. He always hides his face under the mask. The audience, especially the women, are burning up with curiosity, but Mr. X is relentless and continues to carefully hide his face.

At the same time, the city's men surround the beautiful Countess Palinskaya who dream of becoming her husband. But the proud beauty rejects all of them, and then the prince, one of the "failed suitors", decides to play a cruel joke on her. The prince makes an arrangement with Mr. X that he should take off his mask, present himself as a distinguished nobleman and begin to flirt with Palinskaya.

Between the "young nobleman" and the countess a romance arises, and soon a lavish wedding organized by the prince is staged right on the circus arena. But in the midst of the celebration a portrait of Mr. X is brought, the prince tears off the mask from the picture, and everyone sees that the groom is in fact Mr. X! The jubilant prince gloatingly tells to Palinskaya that she became the wife of a miserable circus performer, but then Mr. X unexpectedly intervenes. He begins to tell his true story and then the situation changes instantly...

Simultaneously with Mr. X's romantic story, an equally romantic love story is unfolding between the young student Tony and the young circus gymnast Marie. The young man wants to marry his lover, but the harsh Madame Caroline, Tony's mother and the proprietress of the Hotel "Green Parrot", are absolutely against it. And only the help of the resourceful servant Pelikan can help the lovers to find happiness ...

== Cast ==
- Igor Keblušek as Mr. X (voice by Stanislav Zakharov, vocal by Vladimir Malchenko)
- Natalya Belokhvostikova as Countess Palinskaya (vocal by Galina Kovaleva)
- Nikolay Trofimov as Duke (vocal by Oleg Anofriyev)
- Yuri Moroz as Tony (vocal by Oleg Anofriyev)
- Yelena Shanina as Mary (vocal by Larisa Dolina)
- Lyudmila Kasatkina as Madame Caroline, Tony's mother
- Vladimir Basov as Pelikan, servant
- Alexander Schirvindt as Firelli, director of the circus
- Emmanuil Geller as kapellmeister
- Alexander Pyatkov as hussar
