= Yvonne D'Arle =

American opera singer (1898–1977)

- Yvonne D'Arle, from a 1921 publication.
- Born: Eugenie Marguerite Patet; December 1, 1898; Lyon. France
- Died: March 25, 1977 (aged 78); Cannes. France
- Occupations: Opera and musical theatre singer

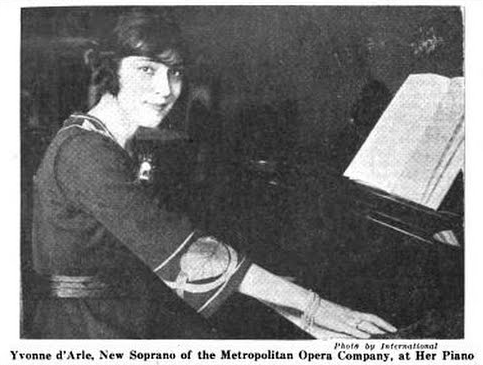
Yvonne D'Arle at a piano, from a 1921 publication.

Yvonne D'Arle (December 1, 1898 – March 25, 1977) was a French-born American soprano singer, born Eugenie Marguerite Patet. She sang with the Metropolitan Opera from 1921 to 1925.

== Early life ==
Eugenie Marguerite Patet was born in Lyon, France, and raised in Rockford, Illinois. Her father, Joseph Patet, was a teacher in Chicago. She attended Rockford Seminary in Illinois, and Miss Wolcott's School for Girls in Denver, Colorado. D'Arle trained as a singer under Estelle Liebling and William Thorner.

== Career ==
D'Arle toured in The Lilac Domino early in her career. She was singing and dancing at a New York cabaret in New York when she was discovered by music critic Sylvester Rawling. She joined the Metropolitan Opera in 1921, and sang with them for five years. In 1922 she sang at a benefit for the Brooklyn Orphan Asylum Society, with singer Titta Ruffo and dancer Roshanara as her co-stars. She also sang with the Municipal Theatre Association in St. Louis, Missouri, and with the Baltimore Symphony Orchestra, in the 1920s. She toured South America with the Bracale Grand Opera Company. In the summer of 1927 she embarked on a European tour with Titta Ruffo, singing in France (at the Deauville Casino's Grand Opera and at the Ostend Kursaal), Germany, and Switzerland.

D'Arle appeared in three Broadway musical productions: Fancy Free (1918), Countess Maritza (1926–1927), and The Three Musketeers (1928). She sang the national anthem at the launch of the radio station WNEW-AM in 1934.

== Personal life ==
D'Arle was involved with fellow opera singer Titta Ruffo. She married twice. Her first husband, Clyde Edward Ganun, died in the 1918 flu pandemic; her second husband was antiques dealer Salvador Benguiat. She had one son, Clyde Ganun (1917–1983). She died in 1977, aged 80 years, in Cannes, France, where she had a villa in Cap d'Antibes since at least her 1927 European tour.
