= Hoheit tanzt Walzer =

Operetta in three acts by Leo Ascher

Hoheit tanzt Walzer (Her Highness Dances the Waltz) is an operetta in three acts by Leo Ascher to a libretto by Julius Brammer and Alfred Grünwald, with a plot loosely based on Oscar Straus' 1907 operetta Ein Walzertraum. It premiered on 24 February 1912 at the Raimund Theater in Vienna. The work also appeared in a version with an extended plot under the title Hochzeitswalzer in Zürich in 1937.

== Reception ==
Hoheit tanzt Walzer was Leo Ascher's most successful work. The premiere at the Raimund Theatre, where Betty Fischer created the role of the Princess Marie, was followed by a run of 500 performances, with more than 2 500 performances over the next ten years. However, it could not establish itself in the contemporary operetta repertoire.

== Roles ==
- Dominik Gaudenzdorf, librarian
- Lisi, his daughter
- Plunderer, a rich inn–keeper
- Peperl Geschwandtner, music teacher (buffo)
- Aloisius Strampfl, (tenor)
- Sali, maid at the Gaudenzdorfs
- Princess Marie (soprano)
- Mrs von Kalesch, court lady
- Prince Victor Bogumil
- Princess Creszentia Luise
- Count Bendl, master of ceremonies
- Guests, courtiers, servants, musicians

== Plot ==
Time and place: Vienna and environs, beginning of the 19th century

In short: Lisi falls in love with Aloisius, but they have no future for the lack of money. Peperl lends them money to open an inn, but the jealous Plunderer schemes to the couple's business failure. Princess Marie visits the inn incognito and falls in love with Peperl, a musician. The Princess gets found out, but her patronage turns the inn's fortune. Sadly, forced by court protocol, the Princess has to marry Prince Victor. She makes the best of the situation by appointing Peperl as music teacher to her younger siblings and making him Hofkapellmeister (conductor of the court orchestra).

=== Act 1 ===
Room at the Gaudenzdorfs

Dominik Gaunzendorf celebrates the 25th year in his occupation. He is anxious to see his daughter Lisi well married, preferably to the rich inn–keeper Plunderer. But Lisi is in love with the poor Aloisius Strampfl. Strampfl wants to buy the inn The Silver Pretzel, but has no money. The music teacher Peperl Geschwandtner is a good friend of the couple, and he lends them the money for a deposit, hoping the enterprise might further his ambition to be appointed as Hofkapellmeister.

Plunderer arrives at the festivities and is arrogantly confident of obtaining Lisi in marriage. But Geschwandtner teases him about his prospects, and Lisi tells him outright she does not like him. His misery is complete when Strampfl, now an inn–keeper himself, gains Lisi as his bride.

The young couple see a rosy future, but Geschwandtner receives a message that his appointment will not be forthcoming.

=== Act 2 ===
The inn The Silver Pretzel

The young couple has no luck with The Silver Pretzel; the competition across the road, Plunderer's inn The Golden Ox, is too successful with its orchestra, so much so that Geschwandtner has to work as waiter in The Silver Pretzel. But soon he manages through clever newspaper advertisements to lure increasing numbers of eligible young ladies and gentlemen into The Silver Pretzel.

By chance, Princess Marie—tired of the rigid court life—appears incognito at The Silver Pretzel. Geschwandtner takes her to be a domestic and falls in love with her. The Princess enjoys the situation enormously and secretly orders the orchestra from The Golden Ox to come and play. She and Geschwandtner join the throng of waltzing couples.

When the court carriage arrives to drive the Princess home, her incognito is lifted, much to Geschwandtner's surprise. As a consequence of the noble visit, the inn's reputation is greatly enhanced and future customer numbers are secured.

=== Act 3 ===
Ante-room in the castle of Princess Marie near Vienna

It is the wedding day of Princess Marie. Following court protocol, she is to marry Prince Victor Bogumil. She reflects with some sadness that a marriage to Geschwandtner might have brought her greater personal happiness, but they both know that social conventions do not permit such a match. Nevertheless, she seeks to support his future by appointing him music teacher to her younger siblings and appointing him to the post of Hofkapellmeister. Geschwandtner, despite having now achieved his life–long ambition to be a musician, remains saddened by the circumstances and aware of what otherwise might have been.

== Notable arias ==
- "Drunten am blauen Donaustrand"
- "Erst zog ich nur galant den Hut"
- "Man preist in tausend Liedern dich, o Wien!"
- "Das ist die Prinzessin Tralala"
- "'s Lercherl von Hernals"

== Movie/TV adaptations ==
- Her Highness Dances the Waltz (1926)
- Her Highness Dances the Waltz (1935)
- Tanecek panny márinky (1935) at IMDb (A Czech-language version of the same film)
- Valse éternelle (1936) at IMDb (A French-language version of the same film)

== Bibliography ==
- Vernik-Eibl, Sabine (2011). Leben und Werk der Komponisten Georg Jarno und Leo Ascher (PDF) (Dr. phil.) (in German). University of Vienna.
