= Mister Iks =

1958 film directed by Yuli Khmelnitsky

- Russian: Мистер Икс
- Directed by: Yuli Khmelnitsky
- Written by: Yuli Khmelnitsky; Nora Rubinstein
- Based on: Die Zirkusprinzessin by Emmerich Kálmán
- Starring: Georg Ots
- Cinematography: Yuli Khmelnitsky
- Edited by: N. Razumova
- Music by: Emmerich Kálmán
- Production company: Lenfilm
- Release date: 1958
- Running time: 95 minutes
- Country: Soviet Union
- Language: Russian

Mister Iks (Russian: Мистер Икс) or Mister X is a Soviet Russian-language black-and-white musical comedy film directed by Yuli Khmelnitsky. It is based on the Leningrad Theatre of Musical Comedy operetta of the same name from 1956. The operetta itself was a Russian adaptation of Emmerich Kálmán's Die Zirkusprinzessin (The Circus Princess).

Filming began in 1957, with many of the actors and artists from the Leningrad Theatre working on the film. It premiered in the Soviet Union and other countries on May 2, 1958.

== Plot ==
A mysterious circus performer known as "Mister X" captivates audiences with his breathtaking acts, including playing the violin while seated on a chair suspended in midair by ropes. His hauntingly beautiful melodies reflect his inner turmoil, stemming from his forbidden love for a noblewoman. Their romance is deemed unacceptable by society, which regards circus performers as third-class citizens.

The enigmatic nature of Mister X intrigues Théodora Verdier, a young widow who has consistently rejected marriage proposals from a nobleman, the Baron. Seeking revenge, the Baron hatches a devious scheme to humiliate her by introducing her to Mister X under a false identity. Théodora and Mister X develop a deep emotional connection, but the Baron's plot exposes Mister X's true identity, leading Théodora to feel betrayed and reject him.

Parallel to this story is the romance between Tony, the son of the owner of the "Green Parrot" hotel, and Marie, a circus performer. Despite his mother's disapproval, their love endures.

The film, set in France rather than Tsarist Russia as in the original operetta by Emmerich Kálmán, concludes with a happy ending. Tony's mother accepts his relationship with Marie, and Théodora ultimately forgives Mister X, choosing love over societal expectations.

== Cast ==
- Georg Ots as Mister X
- Marina Yurasova as Theodora Verdier (Princess Fedora Palinska in the operetta, vocals by Tamara Bogdanova)
- Glikeriya Bogdanova-Chesnokova as Karolina (Carla Schlumberger in the operetta)
- Grigoriy Yarhon as Pelican (Samuel Pressburger in the operetta)
- Zoya Vinogradova as Marie Latouche (Miss Mabel Gibson in the operetta)
- Nikolay Kashirsky as Toni (Toni Schlumberger in the operetta)
- Anatoly Korolkevich as Baron de Kreveliyak (Prinz Sergius Wladimir in the operetta)
- Oskar Lints (or Lintz) as Poisson (Count Sakusin in the operetta)
- David Volosov as Director of the circus (Director Stanislawski in the operetta)
- Yefim Kopelyan as a Theodora's fan (uncredited)
- Georgy Kuhlbush as a Theodora's fan (uncredited)
- Gennady Khudyakov as boy servant (uncredited)

== Crew ==
- Script writers: Nora Rubinstein, Yuli Khmelnitsky
- Lyrics: Olga Fadeeva (Kálmán's music was used, but all Russian text for songs was changed by Olga Fadeeva).
- Director: Yuliy Khmelnitsky
- Operator: Vladimir Burykin
- Designers: Abram Veksler, Yevgeniy Yeney
- Stage manager: Viktor Sadovsky
- Soundman: Rostislav Lapinsky
- Costume designer: Tamara Levitskaya
- Film editor: N. Razumova
- Circus consultant: Georgy Venetsianov
- Editors: Isaac Glikman, Andrey Donatov
- Trick filming:
  - Operator: B. Dudov
  - Designers: Maria Kandat, Marina Bologovskaya
- Orchestra of the Leningrad Theatre of Musical Comedy
  - Conductor: Mikhail Volovats
- Choreographer: Leonid Travinin
- Film directors: Pyotr Nikashin, A. Dombrovsky

== Changes from the operetta ==
Although the film was based on Emmerich Kálmán's Die Zirkusprinzessin, which had premiered at Theater an der Wien in Vienna on 26 March 1926, significant changes had to be made because the operetta was set in Tsarist Russia and as such had many themes which were unacceptable to the censors. The film was set in Paris, rather than Saint Petersburg, the characters became French, and Mister Iks's Hussar's aria was replaced by a marine aria. The actor Grigory Yaron who played Pelican wrote:

"No Kalman operetta made in the Soviet Union had as many different variants as The Circus Princess. For example, when it first premiered in the Soviet Union, the operetta had one embodiment in Moscow, and another in Leningrad. In Moscow, the troupe's "first comedian" portrayed the Russian Grand Duke Nikolai Nikolaevich in exile in Paris; in Leningrad, he was replaced by a rich American, and Pelican, the restaurant's lackey, turned out to be a Russian general, a White émigré. In further versions of this operetta, the émigrés disappeared."
