= Leo Ascher =

Austrian composer

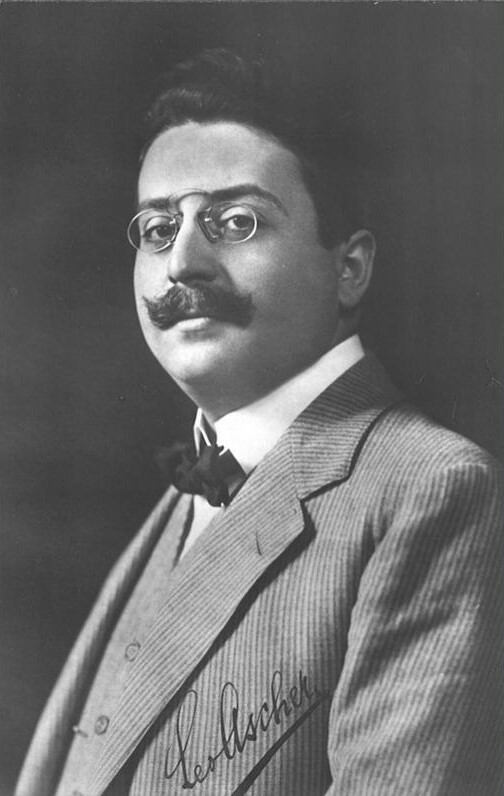
Leo Ascher, 1917

Leo Ascher (17 August 1880 – 25 February 1942) was an Austrian composer of operettas, popular songs and film scores.

== Biography ==
Ascher was born in Vienna. His father, Moritz Ascher, was a local umbrella manufacturer. Leo wrote his first composition, a waltz, at the age of 13 in 1893. He studied law at the University of Vienna, where he received his doctorate in 1904. He also attended the Vienna Conservatory from 1898 and studied composition under Robert Fuchs and Franz Schmidt. He married Luise Frankl and they had one daughter, the writer Franzi Ascher-Nash, who was born in Vienna on 28 November 1910 and died in Millersville, Pennsylvania, on 1 September 1991.

Ascher was briefly arrested during the Kristallnacht pogrom in 1938; once released, he left Austria forever. Via France and England he emigrated to the US, where he lived from December 1939 until his death in New York City in 1942.

His artistic estate is kept at the Leo Ascher Centre of Operetta Music at Millersville University of Pennsylvania, which also provides the Leo Ascher Music Award of up to $1000 to undergraduates. The Aschergasse (Ascher Lane) in Vienna Hitzing is named after him.

== Career ==
Ascher began his career as a composer with the opera Mamzell Courage. His first operetta, Vergeltsgott to a libretto by Viktor Léon, premiered on 14 October 1905 at the Theater an der Wien. He wrote another 30 stage works, among them Vindobona, du herrliche Stadt (Vienna, 22 July 1910) and Bruder Leichtsinn (Bürgertheater, 28 December 1917). His most famous work was Hoheit tanzt Walzer; its premiere on 24 February 1912 at the Raimund Theater was followed by a run of 500 performances. His operetta Der Soldat der Marie (1916) enjoyed even 800 performances in Berlin.

Besides operettas, he composed songs in the Vienna popular style, chansons, and music for films.

After his arrival in New York, he continued to write musicals, patriotic songs and children's pieces until his death on 25 February 1942.

== Works ==
- Mamzell Courage, opera
- Vergeltsgott, operetta (14 October 1905, Theater an der Wien, Vienna)
- Die Grüne Redoute, operetta (26 March 1908, Danzers Orpheum, Vienna)
- Vindobona, du herrliche Stadt, operetta (22 July 1910, Venedig in Wien, Vienna)
- Der fromme Silvanus, operetta (3 November 1910, Cabaret Fledermaus, Vienna)
- Das Goldene Strumpfband, operetta (1 May 1911, Ronacher Etablissement, Vienna)
- Hoheit tanzt Walzer, operetta (24 February 1912, Raimund Theater, Vienna)
- Die goldene Hanna, operetta (4 January 1913, Apollo Kino, Vienna)
- Was tut man nicht alles aus Liebe, operetta (17 December 1914, Ronacher Etablissement, Vienna)
- Botschafterin Leni, operetta (19 February 1915, Theater in der Josefstadt, Vienna)
- Der Soldat der Marie, operetta (1916, Berlin)
- Bruder Leichtsinn, operetta (28 December 1917, Bürgertheater, Vienna)
- Purpur und Waschblau, film music (1931)

== Selected filmography ==
- Marie's Soldier (1927)
- My Leopold (1931)
