= Fritz Freisler =

Austrian screenwriter and film director

- Born: 21 January 1881; Böhmisch Trübau, Bohemia, Austro-Hungarian Empire
- Died: 2 July 1955 (aged 74); Vienna, Austria
- Occupations: Writer, Director
- Years active: 1915–1935 (film )

Fritz Freisler (1881–1955) was an Austrian screenwriter and film director of the silent era.

== Selected filmography ==
- The Other I (1918)
- Love Story (1925)
- Her Highness Dances the Waltz (1926)
- The Arsonists of Europe (1926)
- King of the Centre Forwards (1927)
- Rich, Young and Beautiful (1928)

== Bibliography ==
- Robert von Dassanowsky. Austrian Cinema: A History. McFarland, 2005.
