= Rudolf Schock =

German tenor (1915–1986)

External media

Audio
- Recordings with Rudolf Schock in the Online Archive of the Österreichische Mediathek

Video
- Rudolf Schock's channel on YouTube
- Deutschland schöne Heimat mit Rudolf Schock (1969)
- Auf Schusters Rappen durchs Altmühltal mit Rudolf Schock (1974)

Rudolf Johann Schock (4 September 1915 – 13 November 1986) was a German tenor.

Schock was born in Duisburg, Prussian Rhine Province. He sang a wide repertoire from operetta to Lohengrin, recording among others opera and lieder, doing television, radio and film work.

His voice fell almost into the heldentenor fach but was smaller and more ardent than many voices in that category. Schock is described by Grove as a "lyric tenor" with a warm flexible voice, and a "strong top voice" which suited him to "heroic roles". However the same source feels that his acting left something to be desired.

When he was 18 and still continuing his musical studies that took him to Cologne, Hanover and Berlin, Schock joined the opera chorus at Theater Duisburg in the city of his birth. The Staatstheater Braunschweig cast Schock in solo roles in 1937, but his career was interrupted by his being enlisted into the army in 1940. It resumed after the end of WWII in 1945 in Hanover. The following year, he appeared with two of the Berlin-based opera companies and in 1947 he joined the Hamburg State Opera where he was a member until 1956.

He was one of the first Germans to sing at Covent Garden in 1949. Appearing as Rodolfo, Alfredo, Pinkerton and Tamino in his first season. He sang the title role at Idomeneo at the Salzburg Festival and took part in the premiere there of Rolf Liebermann's, Penelope and the Vienna State Opera's first staging of Lulu. Schock made repeat visits to the Edinburgh International Festival and sang Walther at Bayreuth in 1959.

In 1953, he played and sang the role of Richard Tauber in the film Du bist die Welt für mich (released in English-speaking countries as either You Are the World for Me or The Richard Tauber Story). He was often compared to the older tenor and was spoken of as his successor. He was also considered the most successful German film singer of his generation.

He was interested in the development of younger singers by judging vocal competitions. After discovering Karl Ridderbusch at one of these, Schock part-funded the bass's musical training.

Schock continued making concert appearances into his sixties. Aged 71, he died suddenly of a heart attack in Gürzenich, a district of the town of Düren where he had made his home.

== Selected filmography ==
- Du bist die Welt für mich, as Richard Tauber
- The Happy Wanderer (1955), as Axel Wendt
- Ten on Every Finger (1954) as Himself
- The Csardas King (1958), as Janos
- Gräfin Mariza (1958), as Michael
- The House of Three Girls (1958), as Franz von Schober

As himself

- Not Without Gisela (1951)
- Big Request Concert (1960)
