= Emmerich Kálmán =

Hungarian-born composer of operettas (1882–1953)

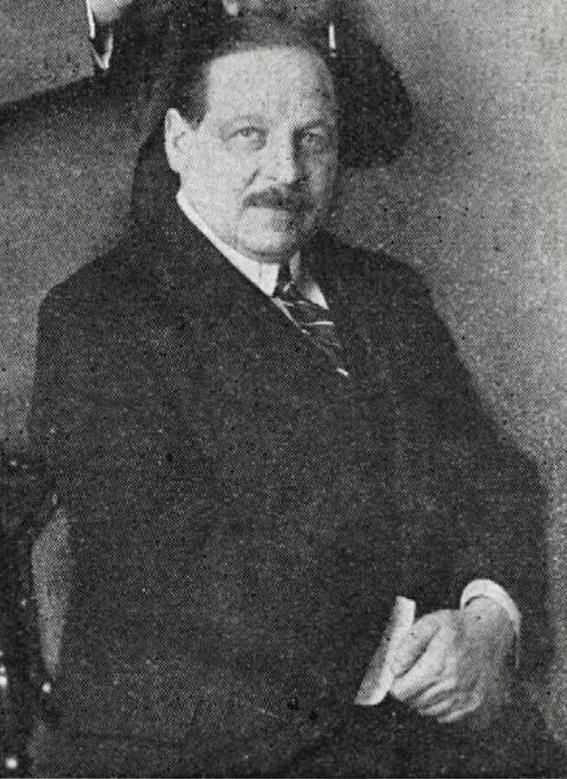
- Born: 24 October 1882; Siófok, Kingdom of Hungary
- Died: 30 October 1953 (aged 71); Paris, France
- Occupation: Composer
- Works: Der Zigeunerprimas (1912); Die Csárdásfürstin (1915); Gräfin Mariza (1924); Die Zirkusprinzessin (1926)

Emmerich Kálmán (Hungarian: Kálmán Imre [ˈkaːlmaːn ˈimrɛ]; 24 October 1882 – 30 October 1953) was a Hungarian composer of operettas and a prominent figure in the development of Viennese operetta in the 20th century. Among his most popular works are Die Csárdásfürstin (1915) and Gräfin Mariza (1924). Influences on his compositional style include Hungarian folk music (such as the csárdás), the Viennese style of precursors such as Johann Strauss II and Franz Lehár, and, in his later works, American jazz. As a result of the Anschluss, Kálmán and his family fled to Paris and then to the United States. He eventually returned to Europe in 1949 and died in Paris in 1953.

== Biography ==
Kálmán was born Imre Koppstein in Siófok, then in Austria-Hungary, on the southern shore of Lake Balaton, to a Jewish family. Kálmán initially intended to become a concert pianist, but because of early-onset arthritis, he focused on composition instead. He studied music theory and composition at the National Hungarian Royal Academy of Music (then the Budapest Academy of Music), where he was a fellow student of Béla Bartók and Zoltán Kodály under Hans Kössler.

His early symphonic poems Saturnalia and Endre és Johanna were well-received, although he failed to achieve publication. He also composed piano music and wrote many songs: a song cycle on poems by Ludwig Jacobowski and a song collection published under the title Dalai.

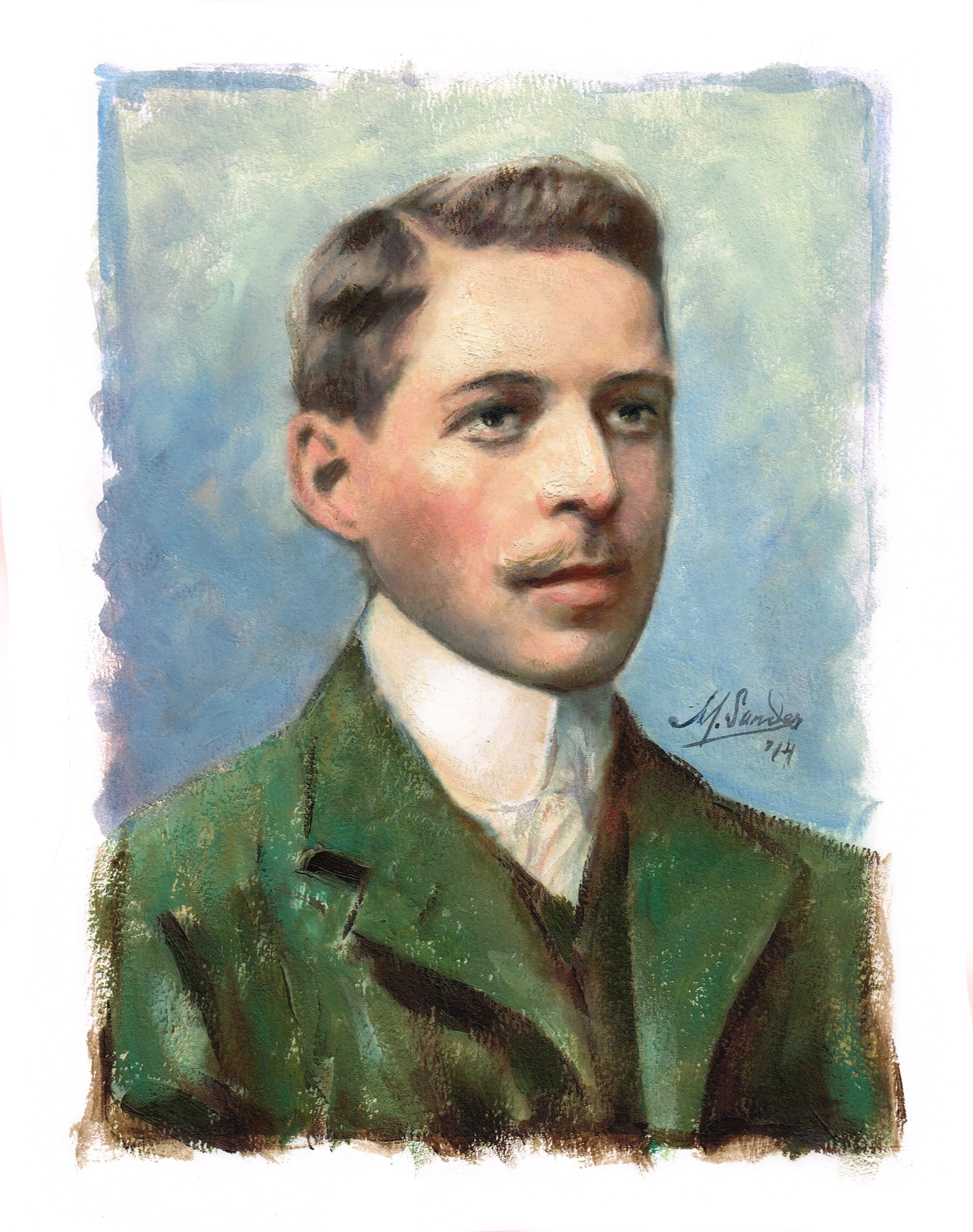
Young Kálmán, by Mart Sander

However, the popularity of his humorous cabaret songs led him towards the composition of operettas. His first great success was Tatárjárás – Ein Herbstmanöver in German, meaning Autumn maneuver, although the English title is The Gay Hussars, which was first staged at the Lustspieltheater in Budapest, on 22 February 1908. Thereafter he moved to Vienna, where he achieved worldwide fame through his operettas Der Zigeunerprimas, Die Csárdásfürstin, Gräfin Mariza, and Die Zirkusprinzessin.

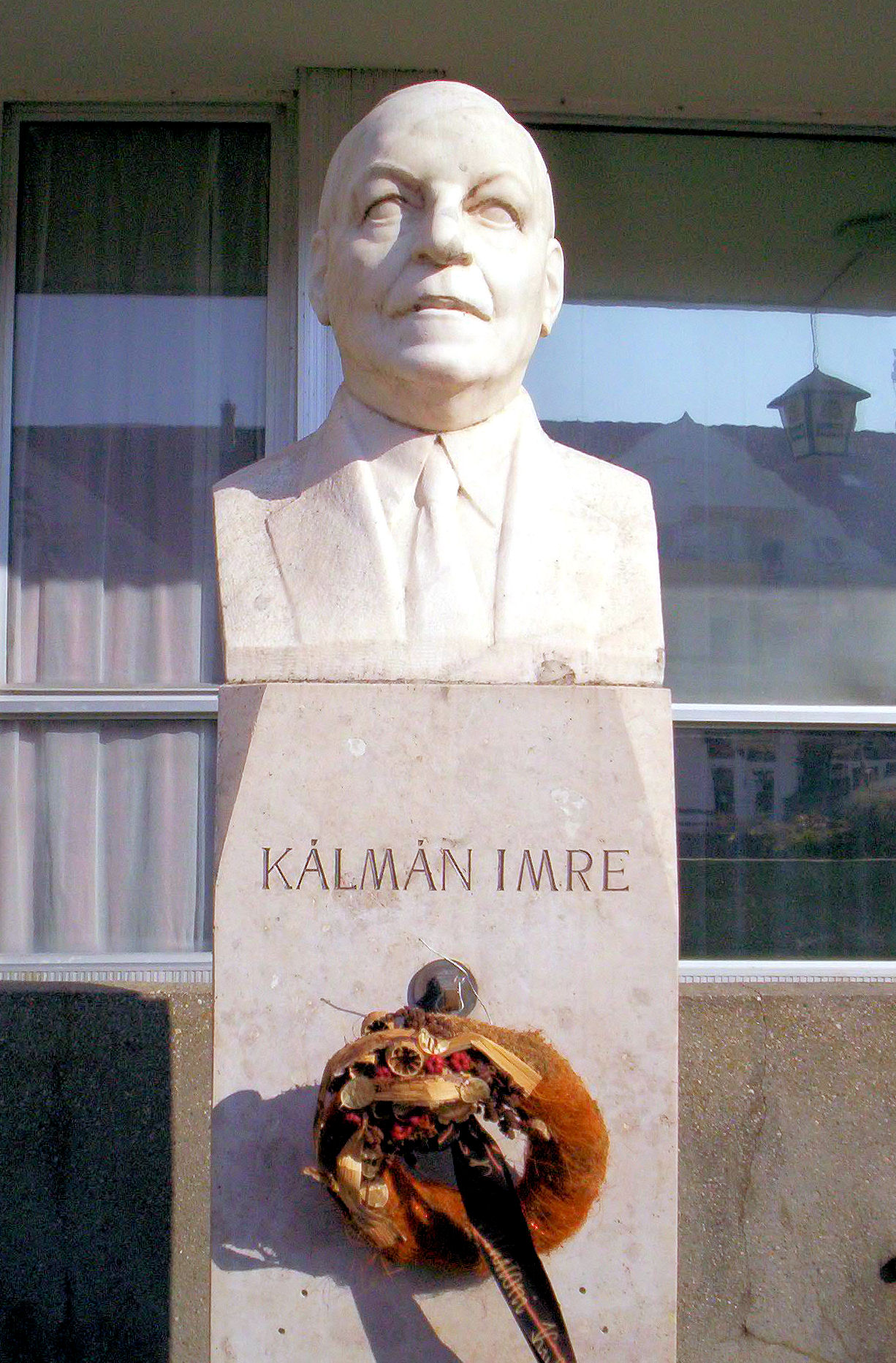
Bust of Kálmán in Siófok

Kálmán and Franz Lehár were the leading composers of what has been called the "Silver Age" of Viennese operetta during the first quarter of the 20th century. He became well known for his fusion of Viennese waltz with Hungarian csárdás. Even so, polyphonically and melodically, Kálmán was a devoted follower of Giacomo Puccini, while in his orchestration methods he employed principles characteristic of Tchaikovsky's music.

In 1929, his first child (with Vera Mendelsohn), Charles Kalman (1929–2015) was born and would later on be also a composer. His daughter Elisabeth Kalman Daunis (1931–1973) was found murdered in Paris, aged 41. His youngest daughter Yvonne Kálmán was born in 1937 and died in November 2025.

Despite his Jewish origins he was one of Adolf Hitler's favorite composers. After the Anschluss, he rejected Hitler's offer to become an 'honorary Aryan' and was forced to move first to Paris, then to the United States, settling in California in 1940.

== Last years and death ==
Following his emigration, performances of his works were prohibited in Nazi Germany. He emigrated back to Vienna from New York in 1949 before moving in 1951 to Paris, where he died.

== Popular culture ==
In 1958 a West German biopic The Csardas King was made of his life, starring Gerhard Riedmann in the lead role.

The supporters of both the national football and handball teams of Iceland use a version of the song Heut’ Nacht hab’ ich geträumt von dir from his operetta Das Veilchen vom Montmartre as an anthem, with Icelandic lyrics (Ég er kominn heim).

The overnight sleeper train from Stuttgart to Budapest is named The Kalman Imre.

== Operettas ==
- Tatárjárás (The Mongol Invasion) – Budapest, 1908
  - Ein Herbstmanöver – Vienna, 1909 (German version of Tatárjárás)
  - The Gay Hussars – Knickerbocker Theatre, Broadway, New York, 1909 (American version of Tatárjárás)
  - Autumn Manoeuvres – London, 1912 (English version of Tatárjárás)
- Az obsitos (The Veteran) – Budapest, 1910
  - Der gute Kamerad – Vienna, 1911 (German revision of Az Obsitos)
  - Gold gab ich für Eisen – Vienna, 1914 (revision of Der gute Kamerad)
  - Her Soldier Boy – Astor Theatre, Lyric Theastre, Shubert Theatre, New York, 1916/17
  - Soldier Boy – London, 1918
- Der Zigeunerprimas (The Gypsy Band Leader) – Vienna, 1912
  - Sari – Liberty Theatre, New Amsterdam Theatre, New York, 1914
- The Blue House – London, 1912
- Der kleine König (The Little King) – Vienna, 1912
- Zsuzsi kisasszony – Budapest, 1915
  - Miss Springtime – New Amsterdam Theatre, New York, 1916/17
  - Die Faschingsfee – Vienna, 1917 (German revision of Zsuzsi kisasszony)
- Die Csárdásfürstin – Vienna, 1915
  - The Riviera Girl – New Amsterdam Theatre, New York, 1917
  - The Gipsy Princess – London, 1921
- Das Hollandweibchen – Vienna, 1920
  - A Little Dutch Girl – London, 1920
  - La Holandesita – Spain, 1921 (Spanish version by Casimiro Giralt)
  - The Dutch Girl – U.S., 1925
- Die Bajadere – Vienna, 1921
  - The Yankee Princess – Knickerbocker Theatre, New York, 1922
- Gräfin Mariza – Vienna, 1924
  - Countess Maritza – Shubert Theatre, New York, 1926/27, with Yvonne d'Arle in the title role.
  - Maritza – London, 1938
- Die Zirkusprinzessin – Vienna, 1926
  - The Circus Princess – Winter Garden Theatre, New York, 1927
- Golden Dawn – Hammerstein's Theatre, New York, 1927/28
- Die Herzogin von Chicago – Vienna, 1928
  - The Duchess of Chicago – U.S., 1929
- Das Veilchen vom Montmartre – Vienna, 1930
  - Paris in Spring – U.S., 1930
  - A Kiss in Spring – London, 1932
- Der Teufelsreiter (Az ördöglovas – The Devil Rider) – Vienna, 1932
- Kaiserin Josephine – Zurich, 1936
- Miss Underground – written 1942, unproduced
- Marinka – Winter Garden Theatre, Ethel Barrymore Theatre, New York, 1945
- Arizona Lady – Bern, 1954
