= Dorothea Chryst =

German singer

Dorothea Chryst, also Dorli-Maria Chryst (born 12 August 1940) is a German operatic and operetta soprano.

== Life ==
Born in Halberstadt, Chryst received singing lessons among others from Christl Gernot-Heindl (opera studio Gernot-Heindl) in Munich, Clemens Glettenberg, Cologne, and with Kammersänger Josef Metternich, a long-time lecturer at the Hochschule für Musik Köln.

In 1964 she made her debut at the Staatstheater am Gärtnerplatz in Munich as maiden Anna in the comic-fantastic opera The Merry Wives of Windsor by Otto Nicolai. Chryst interpreted great parts of opera literature, mainly from the field of soubrette and lyrical coloratura soprano, including Norina in Don Pasquale, Marie in Zar und Zimmermann, Despina in Così fan tutte, Zdenka in Arabella, Nedda in Bajazzo, Zerline in Fra Diavolo and Olympia in The Tales of Hoffmann. In addition, there were various roles in the field of operetta (e.g. Adele in Die Fledermaus) and the musical.

In the 1971/72 season she was Adele at the Staatstheater am Gärtnerplatz in a new production of Die Fledermaus by Kurt Pscherer. Until 1973 she was a permanent ensemble member of the Staatstheater am Gärtnerplatz, but returned again and again for guest roles. In the 1979/80 season she sang Fiorella in the opéra-bouffe Les brigands. In 1981 she also took over the dancer Teresa Casacci in the West German premiere of the musical Casanova (premiere: February 1981, director: Kurt Pscherer) by Helmut Bez and Jürgen Degenhardt; however, her role was only played by the authors with two short appearances and a few vocal lines in the Poland picture of the Second World War. In the 1980/81 season she took over Fiordiligi at the Gärtnerplatztheater in a new production of Così fan tutte (premiere: March 1981, director: Bohumil Herlischka); she "doesn't need to be ashamed of her rock aria, even if there were some intonations that weren't quite straight." In the 1982/83 season the musette followed in La Bohème (premiere: October 1982; director: Kurt Pscherer). In the 1983/84 season she sang the role of Marguerite Duménil in a new production of the Heuberger operetta Der Opernball. Until 1992, Chryst appeared as a guest at the Staatstheater am Gärtnerplatz.

For her many years of artistic work in Munich she was appointed Bavarian Kammersänger.

She has also made guest appearances at all major German opera/operetta stages, including Munich, the Nuremberg Opera House, Vienna (1975, participation in the Vienna Festival), Cologne, Frankfurt and Stuttgart. In December 1969 she appeared at the Vienna State Opera as Adele. At the Seefestspiele Mörbisch in 1974, Chryst took over the role of the Briefchristel in the operetta Der Vogelhändler. In 1975, she played the role of Köchin Ciboletta in the Strauß's operetta Eine Nacht in Venedig at the Bregenzer Festspiele.

For many years she taught singing at the Leopold Mozart Conservatory in Augsburg. (today: Leopold Mozart Centre). Her students included sopranos Stephanie M.-L. Bornschlegl, Anja Augustin, Ingrid Fraunholz, mezzo-soprano Annette Beck, bass Markus Wandl and tenor Tobias Wall.

Furthermore, she recorded numerous records with Margit Schramm, Gisela Ehrensperger, Rudolf Schock and Ferry Gruber.

== Discography (partial) ==
- Benatzky/Stolz: The White Horse Inn. Role: Ottilie Siedler
  Performers: Marion Briner, soprano; Peter Minich, tenor; Frederic Mayer, tenor.
  Ein großes Operettenorchester mit Chor. Conductor: Carl Michalski.
  Telefunken 1971.
- Kálmán: Die Csárdásfürstin. Role: Stasi
  Performers: Margit Schramm, soprano; Rudolf Schock, tenor; Ferry Gruber, tenor.
  Der Günther Arndt-Chor. Berliner Symphoniker. Conductor: Robert Stolz.
  Ariola Eurodisc.
- Kálmán: Gräfin Mariza. Role: Lisa
  Performers: Margit Schramm, soprano; Rudolf Schock, tenor; Ferry Gruber, tenor.
  Der Günther Arndt-Chor. Berliner Symphoniker. Conductor: Robert Stolz.
  Ariola Eurodisc.
- Lehár: Die lustige Witwe. Role: Valencienne
  Performers: Margit Schramm, soprano; Rudolf Schock, tenor; Jerry J. Jennings, tenor; Benno Kusche, Bass.
  Der Chor der Deutsche Oper Berlin. Berliner Symphoniker. Conductor: Robert Stolz.
  Ariola Eurodisc. Recording date: November 1966.
- Lehár: Giuditta. Role: Anita
  Performers: Sylvia Geszty, soprano; Rudolf Schock, tenor; Ferry Gruber, tenor.
  Der Günther Arndt-Chor. Berliner Symphoniker. Conductor: Werner Schmidt-Boelcke.
  Ariola.
- Lehár: Zigeunerliebe. Role: Ilona von Köröshaza
  Performers: Margit Schramm, soprano; Rudolf Schock, tenor; Julius Katona, tenor.
  Der Günther Arndt-Chor. Berliner Symphoniker. Conductor: Robert Stolz.
  Ariola.
- Lehár: Paganini. Role: Bella Giretti
  performers: Margit Schramm, soprano; Rudolf Schock, tenor; Ferry Gruber, tenor.
  Der Günther Arndt-Chor. Berliner Symphoniker. Conductor: Robert Stolz.
  Ariola.
- Goldene Operette: La Vie parisienne (part)
  Performers: Gisela Ehrensperger, soprano; Ulf Fürst, tenor; Walter Köninger, Baritone.
  Das Orchester des Staatstheaters am Gärtnerplatz. Conductor: Peter Falk.
  Telefunken 1979.
- Goldene Operette: Die Fledermaus (part)
  Performers: Gisela Ehrensperger, soprano; Ulf Fürst, tenor; Jörn W. Wilsing, Baritone.
  Munich Symphony Orchestra. Conductor: Peter Falk.
  Telefunken 1977.
- Goldene Operette: Der Vetter aus Dingsda (part)
  performers: Gisela Ehrensperger, soprano; Ulf Fürst, tenor; Harry Friedauer, tenor.
  Munich Symphony Orchestra. Conductor: Peter Falk.
  Telefunken 1977.
- Goldene Operette: Saison in Salzburg (part)
  Performers: Gisela Ehrensperger, soprano; Ulf Fürst, tenor; Harry Friedauer, tenor.
  Munich Symphony Orchestra. Conductor: Peter Falk.
  Telefunken 1977.
