= Elisabeth Biebl =

German actress

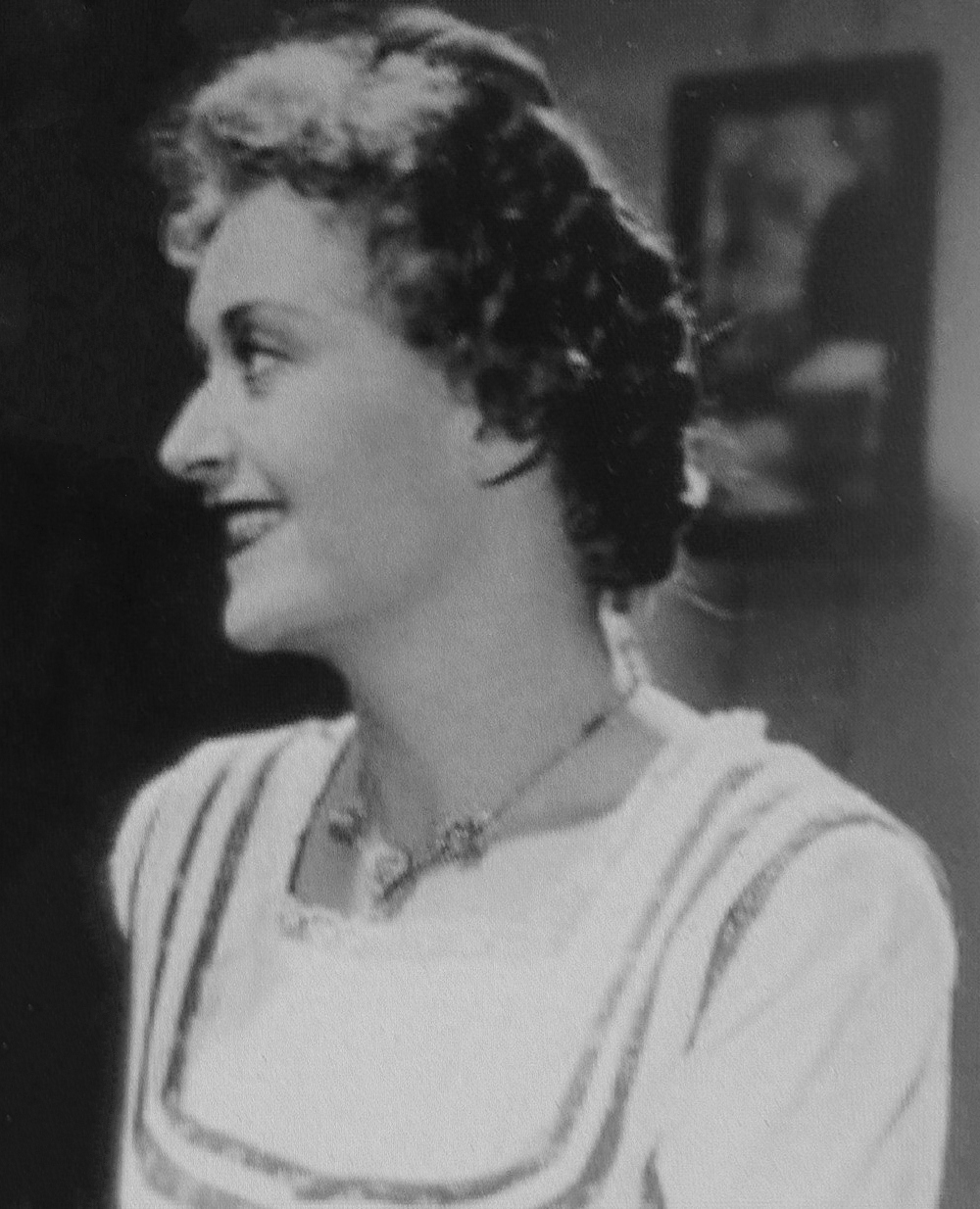
Elisabeth Biebl as Annamirl in the film Die drei Dorfheiligen

Elisabeth Biebl (8 May 1915 – 4 December 1989), also Elisabeth Biebl von Klipstein-Sporrer, was a German operetta singer and actress.

== Life and career ==
Born in Munich, Beibl appeared as a child at the Bavarian State Opera, where she received training as a dancer. From 1930 to 1931 she was engaged as such at the Staatstheater am Gärtnerplatz, then for a year at the Bayerische Musikbühne, a travelling company. She then studied music and singing in her hometown. Her musical career began as an operetta soubrette at the Stadttheater Fürth, to which she belonged from 1934 to 1938. In 1940 she changed to the Staatstheater am Gärtnerplatz.

There she performed in 1942 under Fritz Fischer's direction in the musical comedy "Gitta". In the 1950s and 1960s she was a highly acclaimed star at the aforementioned theatre, where she played alongside Harry Friedauer, Rosl Schwaiger, Dorothea Chryst, Ferry Gruber, Martha Kunig-Rinach and others and belonged to the permanent ensemble until 1978. Furthermore Biebl took part in some (TV) movies. She played among other roles Annamirl in the first film adaptation of Die drei Dorfheiligen, and the landlady Neudecker in Der Hochzeitslader of the TV series Königlich Bayerisches Amtsgericht. She also played a part in the 1951 Border Post 58 film.

Biebl was married three times, including to the operetta singer Hans-Heinz Bollmann and Ernst von Klipstein, whom she met during the shooting of Die drei Dorfheiligen.

Biebl died in Munich at age 79 and is buried at Munich Waldfriedhof.

== Literature ==
- Bayerisches Staatstheater am Gärtnerplatz (publisher): 100 Jahre Theater am Gärtnerplatz München, Munich 1965
