= Biebl =

Biebl is a German surname that may refer to

- Elisabeth Biebl (1915–1989), German operetta singer and actress
- Franz Biebl (1906–2001), German composer
- Heidi Biebl (1941–2022), German alpine skier
- Konstantin Biebl (1898–1951), Czech poet and writer
- Sepp Biebl (born 1936), German speed skater
