= Rosl Schwaiger =

Austrian operatic coloratura soprano (1918–1970)

- Born: 5 September 1918; Saalfelden, Austria-Hungary
- Died: 19 April 1970 (aged 51); Munich, West Germany
- Education: Mozarteum
- Occupation: Operatic coloratura soprano
- Organizations: Vienna State Opera; Bayerische Staatsoper; Salzburg Festival
- Awards: Kammersängerin

Rosl Schwaiger (5 September 1918 – 19 April 1970) was an Austrian operatic coloratura soprano. She was a member of the Vienna State Opera and the Bayerische Staatsoper, known for singing Mozart roles such as Blonde, Susanna and Zerlina. She appeared at European opera houses and festivals and was especially popular at the Salzburg Festival, where she appeared for decades in opera and sacred concerts.

== Life and career ==
Schwaiger was born in Saalfelden. She received first music lessons with her father, an organist, and studied piano and voice at the Mozarteum in Salzburg. She made her debut at the Salzburger Landestheater in 1940 as the Queen of the Night in Mozart's Die Zauberflöte. Schwaiger subsequently received engagements at the Theater Basel and in Bregenz. She worked at the Volksoper from 1942 and at the Vienna State Opera from 1945 to 1952. Major roles there included Susanna in Mozart's Le nozze di Figaro, Zerlina in his Don Giovanni, Ännchen in Weber's Der Freischütz, Rosina in Rossini's Il barbiere di Siviglia, Norina in Donizetti's Don Pasquale, Olympia in Offenbach's Les contes d'Hoffmann, Gilda in Verdi's Rigoletto, and Ninetta in Prokofieff's Die Liebe zu den drei Orangen.

In 1952, artistic director Rudolf Hartmann engaged Schwaiger as first coloratura soprano for the Bayerische Staatsoper and Staatstheater am Gärtnerplatz in Munich. In those two theatres her partners included Harry Friedauer, Marianne Schech, Erika Köth, Martha Kunig-Rinach, and Sári Barabás. She appeared as Papagena in a production of Die Zauberflöte in 1956, conducted by Hans Knappertsbusch at the Prinzregententheater in Munich, and as Adina in Donizetti's L'elisir d'amore alongside Benno Kusche in 1957.

She performed regularly at the Salzburg Festival and in opera and concerts of sacred music until 1965. In 1945, she appeared as Blonde in Mozart's Die Entführung aus dem Serail and in 1946 as Barbarina in his Le nozze di Figaro and as Sophie in Der Rosenkavalier by Richard Strauss. She performed at the Salzburg Cathedral in Schubert's Mass in G major and Mozart's Vesperae solennes de confessore in 1954. She was one of the most popular singers at the Salzburg Festival during her time there.

Schwaiger also appeared in operetta, including Arsena in Der Zigeunerbaron by Johann Strauss. In 1952 she performed the leading role in the WDR production of the operetta The Geisha by Sidney Jones, directed by Franz Marszalek. In 1966 Schwaiger, who had been appointed a Bavarian Kammersängerin, sang the role of Maria at the premiere of the Salzburger Passion by Cesar Bresgen at the Großes Festspielhaus in Salzburg.

In 1954 Schwaiger undertook a successful tour of North America. Three years later she sang at the Glyndebourne Festival Opera as Blonde, Papagena, and Najade in Ariadne auf Naxos by Richard Strauss. She gave lieder recitals in Greece and Turkey in 1958.

Schwaiger died in Munich at age 51.

== Recordings ==
Schwaiger recorded Barbarina in Figaro in 1956, conducted by Karl Böhm, alongside Paul Schöffler and Sena Jurinac, Walter Berry and Rita Streich.
