= Ferry Gruber =

Austrian-German opera singer (1926–2004)

- Ferry Gruber, in the 1950s
- Born: 28 September 1926; Vienna, Austria
- Died: 23 July 2004 (aged 77); Gräfelfing, Bavaria, Germany
- Education: Wiener Musikakademie
- Occupations: Operatic tenor; Operetta director
- Organizations: Bavarian State Opera; Staatstheater am Gärtnerplatz
- Awards: Kammersänger

Ferry Gruber (28 September 1926 – 23 July 2004) was an Austrian-German tenor in opera and operetta. A member of both the Bavarian State Opera and Staatstheater am Gärtnerplatz in Munich for half a century, he focused on roles of the buffo genre and operetta. He made recordings, appeared on radio and television, performed internationally at major opera houses and festivals, and worked also as an operetta director and a private voice teacher. He was a favourite with the audience, and received the title Kammersänger.

== Career ==
Born in Vienna, Gruber studied conducting at the Wiener Musikakademie with Hans Swarowsky and Hermann Gallos. He then worked as a choral conductor in Vienna, but soon turned to singing. He made his debut at the Staatstheater Lucerne in 1950 as Tamino in Mozart's Die Zauberflöte. He moved to the Theater Basel and then went to the Bavarian State Opera in Munich in 1954, where his first role was Alfredo in Verdi's La traviata. He turned to the buffo repertoire, such as Baron Lummer in Intermezzo by Richard Strauss, Benoît in Puccini's La bohème, Dr. Blind in Die Fledermaus by Johann Strauss), Ambrogio in Rossini's Il barbiere di Siviglia, and Ferenc in Smetana's Die verkaufte Braut. From the first year, Gruber also belonged to the ensemble of the Staatstheater am Gärtnerplatz there, specialising in operetta. He became one of the most popular and acclaimed singers of the house, along with Harry Friedauer. Among his opera and operetta partners were Christine Görner, Margit Schramm, Erika Köth, Sári Barabás, Dorothea Chryst, Liselotte Ebnet, Friedauer and John van Kesteren. Gruber was remembered as Monostatos in Die Zauberflöte. He appeared in Prokofiev's Die Liebe zu den drei Orangen with Ingeborg Hallstein, staged in 1960 at the Theater am Gärtnerplatz by Arno Assmann. Gruber performed at the two Munich stages for 50 years, and appeared as a guest at major opera houses in Europe. From 1960, he performed regularly at the Volksoper in Vienna.

Gruber made several recordings with the conductor Franz Marszalek for the broadcaster Westdeutscher Rundfunk in Cologne. He made numerous recordings of operas and operettas. In addition, Gruber appeared in several operetta films and television broadcasts. He worked as an opera and operetta director from 1969 and gave private singing lessons. He was awarded the title Kammersänger.

Gruber died in Munich at the age of 77 and was buried in the cemetery of Gräfelfing near Munich.

== Recordings ==
Gruber's recordings include

- Lehár: Das Land des Lächelns (as Graf Gustav von Pottenstein/Gustl)
- Lehár: Die lustige Witwe (as Njegus)
- Orff: Die Kluge (as first vagabond)
- Orff: Der Mond (as third rascal)
- Puccini: Madama Butterfly (as Goro)
- Johann Strauss: Die Fledermaus (as Dr. Blind)
