= Otto Jochum =

German composer and conductor

- Born: 18 March 1898; Babenhausen, Swabia, German Empire
- Died: 24 October 1969 (aged 71); Bad Reichenhall, Bavaria, West Germany
- Education: Augsburg Conservatory; Musikhochschule München
- Occupations: Music educator; Organist; Composer; Choral conductor; Conservatoire director
- Organizations: St. Georg, Augsburg; Singschule Augsburg; Augsburg Conservatory
- Awards: Deutscher Staatspreis; Order of Merit of the Federal Republic of Germany

Otto Jochum (German pronunciation: [ˈɔtoː ˈjɔxʊm]; 18 March 1898 – 24 October 1969) was a German composer, choral director and music educator. He was influential in Augsburg, where he was organist at St. Georg from 1922, director of a Singschule for vocal training from 1933, founding a seminary for vocal educators in 1935 and a municipal choir the same year. He was also director of the Augsburg Conservatory from 1938. After World War II, he was municipal music director in Augsburg.

Jochum composed mostly choral works. His oratorio Der jüngste Tag was awarded the Deutscher Staatspreis for composition in 1932, receiving national recognition. He composed most of his works after retirement in 1951.

== Life ==
Jochum was born in Babenhausen, the son of a Catholic teacher, organist, choirmaster and director of the orchestra and theatre society. He and his younger siblings Mathilde, Eugen and Georg Ludwig received early musical instructions. He learned to play violin, cello, piano, organ and percussion. Their father also instructed them in counterpoint. He trained to be a teacher at the Lehrerbildungsanstalt seminary in Lauingen. He had to serve in the military in the First World War from 1916 to 1918. Returning after the war, he worked at the seminary from 1919 and at a school in Augsburg from 1920 to 1933. He composed a cantata Babenhauser Totentanz (Babenhausen Danse Macabre) about seven images in the Babenhausen church in 1920.

Jochum studied composition from 1922 to 1928 at the Augsburg Conservatory with Fritz Klopper and Heinrich Kaspar Schmid. From 1928 to 1931, he studied at the Musikhochschule München with Joseph Haas, while still working in Augsburg. There, he was also organist at the St. Georg and conducted lay choirs. His oratorio Der jüngste Tag was awarded the Deutscher Staatspreis in 1932. In 1933, he also became director of the Singschule for vocal training, succeeding its founder Albert Greiner. He founded in 1935 an associated Singschullehrerseminar, educating teachers. He founded the Städtischer Chor, the municipal choir, the same year. On 1 May 1937, Jochum was admitted to the Nazi Party at his request (membership number: 5,346,623). In 1938, he also became director of the Augsburg Conservatory. His compositions published at that time are influenced by the spirit of the period: Vaterländische Hymne, Flamme empor and Ich bin ein deutsches Mädchen. In 1938, he composed Unser Lied: Deutschland!, a folk anthem based on words by Arthur Maximilian Miller. His Christmas work, Ein Weihnachtssingen, scored for soloists, chorus, and orchestra, was premiered in Augsburg in 1942.

After World War II, Jochum was choirmaster of the "Jochum-Choir", which he founded in 1947, and municipal music director in Augsburg. He retired in 1951 due to health, and lived as a freelance composer in Bieberbach near Bad Reichenhall where he composed most of his music. He left mainly choral works, including more than 100 motets, 16 masses, four oratorios, two symphonies (which he dedicated to Goethe and Bruckner), a string quartet as well as song cycles and cantatas. He published numerous arrangements of Volkslieder. At age 60, he wrote a memoir of his youth, entitled Besinnliches und Ergötzliches aus meiner Jugendzeit.

Jochum died in Bad Reichenhall at the age of 71. He was buried in the cemetery of his hometown Babenhausen. His early cantata Babenhauser Totentanz was premiered after his death in 1978.

== Awards ==
- 1932: Deutscher Staatspreis für Komposition for Der jüngste Tag
- 1958: Golden Ring of Honour of Babenhausen
- 1959: Order of Merit of the Federal Republic of Germany
- 1968: Schillerplakette of Mannheim
- 1976: First award of an "Otto Jochum Medal" named after him by Schwäbisch-Bayerischer Sängerbund, to personalities who have rendered outstanding services to the Swabian choral scene
