= Karl Gustav Fellerer =

German musicologist (1902–1984)

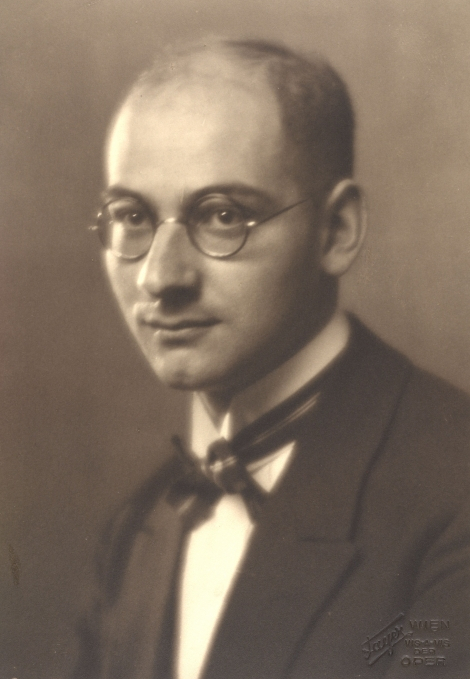
Karl Gustav Fellerer, 1927

Karl Gustav Fellerer (7 July 1902 – 7 January 1984) was a German musicologist. His works include more than 600 scientific publications on Catholic Church music, Italian music from 1600 to the beginning of the 20th century, and music history of the 19th century. He wrote monographs on Palestrina, Handel, Mozart, and Max Bruch and was editor of several musical journals. He published the Kirchenmusikalisches Jahrbuch (Church Music Almanac) for 46 years, from 1930 until 1976. Fellerer was president of several musicology societies, including 16 years of the Joseph Haas Society.

== Career ==
Fellerer was born on 7 July 1902 in Freising, Bavaria. He studied in Regensburg, then in Munich, where Joseph Haas was among his teachers, and in Berlin where in 1925 he gained a Ph.D. Following his habilitation, he then taught as Privatdozent at the University of Münster and the University of Fribourg where he gained full professorship in 1934. In 1939, he received a call to the University of Cologne and became the director of its Musikwissenschaftliches Institut (Institute of Musicology).

From 1956 until 1958, Fellerer was dean of the Faculty of Philosophy; from 1967 until 1968 he was the university's rector. He became professor emeritus in 1970.

Aged 81, he died on 7 January 1984 in München Hauptbahnhof when he returned from a meeting on church music in Innsbruck.

== Honours ==
Fellerer was member of several academies of science, including those in London, Brussels, and Copenhagen. He was awarded the Mozart Medal, the Great Cross of the Order of Merit of the Federal Republic of Germany, the Austrian Cross of Honour for Science and Art (in 1977) and the Commander's Cross of the Papal Order of St. Gregory the Great. He was honoured with two Festschriften, one on each of his 60th and 70th birthdays.
