= Harry Friedauer =

German actor and singer

Harry Friedauer (7 July 1927 – 14 October 1985 (Note: Elsewhere incorrectly given 1986 as the year of death and Munich as the place of death)) was a German actor and operetta singer (tenor).

== Life and career ==
Born in Karlsruhe, Friedauer was drafted at the end of the Second World War and seriously wounded. After his education as an actor and singer he got his first engagement at the Badisches Staatstheater Karlsruhe. At the beginning of the 1950s, he came to the Staatstheater am Gärtnerplatz. There he quickly became a favourite of the audience, not only because of his spirited stage presence but also because of his dancing and acrobatic ability. He was noted in the following parts among others: Gustl in The Land of Smiles, Richard in Schwarzwaldmädel, Luigi in Gasparone, Prince Orlofsky in Die Fledermaus, Ivan in Der Zarewitsch, Armand in The Count of Luxembourg, Mercury in Orpheus in the Underworld and as Adam in Der Vogelhändler. He belonged to the Gärtnerplatz company for 35 years as a permanent member of the ensemble.

Friedauer, who was appointed chamber actor in the 1960s, sang with Sari Barabas, Rosl Schwaiger, Christine Görner, Elisabeth Biebl, Erika Köth, Hertha Töpper, Topsy Küppers, Renate Holm, Anneliese Rothenberger, Liselotte Ebnet, Otto Storr, Ferry Gruber etc.

He gave guest performances on several German-speaking stages (at home and abroad) among others in 1959 at the Seefestspiele Mörbisch (as Zsupan in Countess Mariza). Friedauer took part in some movies and recorded a considerable number of operettas and songs. He also had many radio and several TV appearances, including Dalli Dalli (1972), Zum Blauen Bock (1972) and Robert Stolz on his 90th birthday (1970).

Friedmann was married twice and had two daughters. He died as a result of a car accident during a walk in Marzling, Landkreis Freising at age 78. He is buried at the Münchner Nordfriedhof.

== Discography (partial) ==
- Banditenstreiche Walhall 1954
- Rendezvous mit Harry Friedauer LP EMI (1967?)
- Der Zarewitsch EMI-Classic 1996
- Igo Hofstetter - Roulette der Herzen, Alles spricht von Charpillon, Schach dem Boss ORF Oberösterreich 1996
- Operettenmelodien EMI-Classic 2000
- Operettenmelodien EMI-Classic 2002
- Die Csárdásfürstin, Gräfin Mariza, Im weissen Rössl EMI-Classic 2003
- Der liebe Augustin, Clivia, Die ungarische Hochzeit EMI-Classic 2003
- Lehár EMI-Classic 2004
- Operetten EMI-Classic 2004

== Filmography ==
- 1955: Der Frontgockel.
- 1959: Mandolinen und Mondschein
- 1959: Mikosch of the Secret Service
- 1961: Cancan und Bakarole.

== Literature ==
- Bayerisches Staatstheater am Gärtnerplatz (publisher): 100 Jahre Theater am Gärtnerplatz. Munich 1965
- Karl-Josef Kutsch, Leo Riemens: Großes Sängerlexikon. Volume 2, Munich 2000, p. 1215
