= Joseph Haas =

German composer and music teacher (1879–1960)

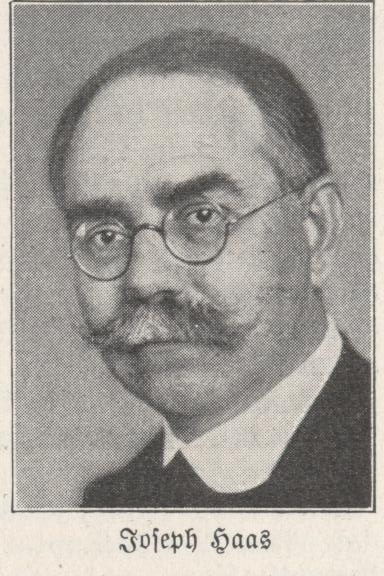

Joseph Haas (19 March 1879 – 30 March 1960) was a German late romantic composer and music teacher.

== Biography ==
He was born in Maihingen, near Nördlingen to teacher Alban Haas from his second marriage, being half-brother to the theologian and historian Alban Haas. At an early age he came into contact with music. He became a teacher himself and taught from 1897 to 1904 in Lauingen near the Danube.

In his effort to pursue his musical inclination, he met Max Reger, with whom he took private lessons from 1904 in Munich. He later followed him to Leipzig in 1907 to study music at the Leipzig Conservatory. Among his teachers were Karl Straube and Adolf Ruthardt. In 1909 Haas finished his studies. In 1911, having had his first success as a composer and having won an Arthur Nikisch scholarship, he became teacher of composition at the Stuttgart Conservatory, where he was named professor in 1916. From 1921 he taught at the Akademie für Tonkunst in Munich (today Hochschule für Musik und Theater München); he was professor there from 1924 to 1950.

In 1921, together with Paul Hindemith and Heinrich Burkard, he established the Donaueschinger Kammermusikaufführungen zur Förderung zeitgenössischer Tonkunst.

In 1930, he became a member of the Prussian Academy of Arts in Berlin.

After the Second World War, he became president of the Munich Hochschule für Musik und Theater, a position which he held until he became Emeritus Professor in 1950 and led the school's reconstruction after 1945.

He died in Munich and was buried in the Munich Waldfriedhof.

== Importance ==
=== As a composer ===
The work of Haas was entirely based on tonality. At first, he was strongly influenced by his mentor Max Reger, whose language of polyphony and harmony also featured in Haas's music.

During his lifetime, Haas was a successful and well known composer. In 1954, for his 75th birthday, numerous celebratory festivals took place in both West and East Germany. After his death, the presence of his works in concerts has dramatically decreased.

In 1949, the composer's friend Rupert Egenberger established the Joseph-Haas-Gesellschaft, dedicated to Haas and his work.

==== Selected works ====
Stage works

- Die Bergkönigin (op. 70; 1927), music for a Christmas play 3 acts by Franziska Rodenstock
- Tobias Wunderlich (op. 90; 1934–37), opera in 3 acts. libretto: Ludwig Strecker, premiere 24 November 1937 Staatstheater Kassel, conducted by Robert Heger
- Die Hochzeit des Jobs (op. 93; 1940–43), comic opera in 4 acts, libretto: Ludwig Strecker, premiere 2 July 1944 Semperoper, conducted by Karl Elmendorff

Oratorios

- Die heilige Elisabeth (op. 84)
- Christnacht (op. 85)
- Das Lebensbuch Gottes (op. 87)
- Das Lied von der Mutter (op. 91)
- Das Jahr im Lied (op. 103)
- Die Seligen (op. 106)

Song cycles

- Sechs Krippenlieder (op. 49).
- Unterwegs (op. 65) after Hermann Hesse
- Gesänge an Gott (op. 68) after Jakob Kneip

Masses, sacred music

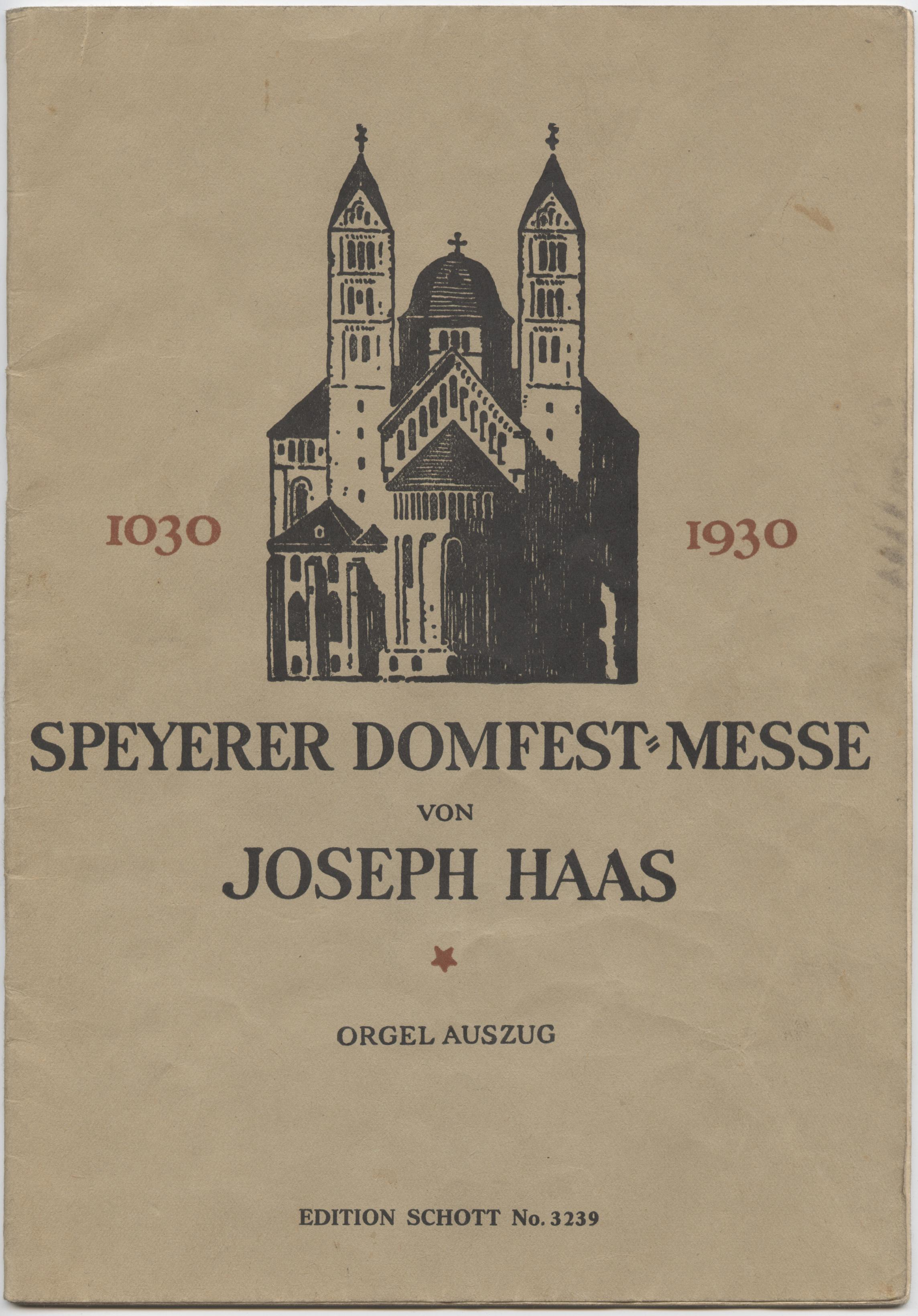
Cover to Speyerer Domfestmesse

- Eine Deutsche Singmesse (op. 60)
- Speyerer Domfestmesse (op. 80)
- Christ-König-Messe (op. 88)
- Münchener Liebfrauenmesse (op. 96)
- Te Deum (op. 100)
- Totenmesse (op. 101)
- Deutsche Weihnachtsmesse (op. 105)
- Deutsche Chormesse (op. 108)

Orchestral works

- Heitere Serenade (op. 41)
- Variationen und Rondo über ein altdeutsches Volkslied (op. 45)
- Variationensuite über ein altes Rokokothema (op. 64)
- Ouvertüre zu einem frohen Spiel (op. 95)

Chamber music

- Streichquartett g-Moll (op. 8)
- Violinsonate h-Moll (op. 21)
- Divertimento D-Dur (op. 22) for string trio
- Waldhornsonate F-Dur (op. 29)
- Divertimento C-Dur (op. 30a) for string quartet
- Kammertrio a-Moll (op. 38) for two violins and piano
- Grillen (op. 40) for violin and piano
- Streichquartett A-Dur (op. 50)
- Kirchensonate F-Dur (op. 62/1) for violin and organ
- Kirchensonate d-Moll (op. 62/2) for violin and organ

Piano music

- Wichtelmännchen (op. 27)
- Gespenster (op. 34)
- Hausmärchen (op. 35, op. 43, op. 53)
- Eulenspiegeleien (op. 39)
- Alte unnennbare Tage Elegien für Klavier (op. 42)
- Sonate a-Moll (op. 46)
- Zwei Sonaten (D-Dur, a-Moll) (op. 61)
- Vier Sonatinen (C-Dur, d-Moll, G-Dur, F-Dur) (op. 94)
- Klangspiele, Zehn kleine Stücke für Klavier (op. 99)

Organ music

- Drei Präludien und Fugen (c-Moll, g-Moll, D-Dur) (op. 11)
- Sonate c-Moll (op. 12)
- Suite d-Moll (op. 20)
- Suite A-Dur (op. 25)

=== As a teacher ===
Haas was an important music teacher. Among his numerous students are composers and conductors, such as Otto Jochum (1898–1969), Karl Gustav Fellerer, Eugen Jochum, Karl Amadeus Hartmann, Karl Höller, Philipp Mohler (1908–1982), Cesar Bresgen, Ernst Kutzer (1918–2008), and Wolfgang Sawallisch, and Margarete Schweikert.
