= Klaus Schultz =

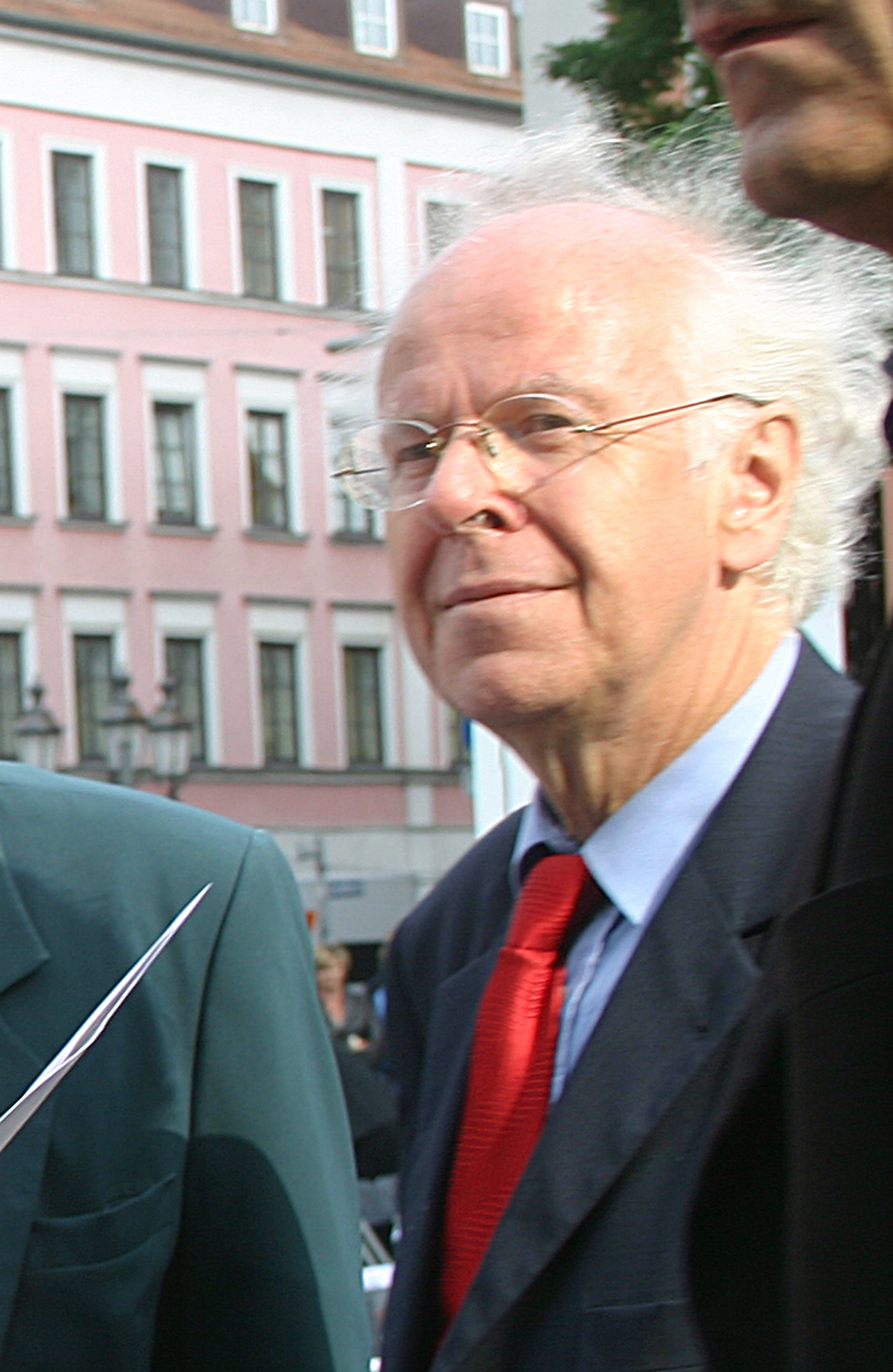
Klaus Schultz (2006)

Klaus Schultz (20 May 1947 in Bad Kissingen – 26 April 2014 in Munich) was a German dramaturge and intendant.

== Education ==
After training as a diploma librarian for scientific libraries, and working at the Bavarian State Library in Munich, Schultz studied at the University of Erlangen–Nuremberg and LMU Munich without graduating. From 1972, he worked as a freelance dramaturge for various opera productions in Munich, Frankfurt am Main and Augsburg. From 1973/74 to 1977, he was dramaturge at the Oper Frankfurt under opera director Christoph von Dohnányi.

From 1977 to 1982, he worked as chief dramaturge and press officer for the Bavarian State Opera and appeared in the matinée Rund um die Oper, invited by intendant August Everding. Schultz co-developed the concept for this matinée and later engaged Heinz Rühmann repeatedly for readings in Aachen and Mannheim between 1985 and 1993. Parallel to this, he worked from 1980 to 1984 as music dramaturge of the Berlin Philharmonic.

== Career ==
=== Generalintendant and other theater work ===
From 1984 to 1992, he was Generalintendant of the Aachen stages, and from 1992 to 1996 of the National Theatre Mannheim. From September 1996 until the end of the 2006/07 theatre season, he was intendant and chief dramaturge at the Staatstheater am Gärtnerplatz in Munich.

At the Gärtnerplatztheater, as previously in Aachen and Mannheim, Schultz shaped a repertoire of opera, ballet, concert, musical and operetta, with a particular emphasis on music of the 20th century after 1950. Among the works staged were Aribert Reimann’s Melusine, Igor Stravinsky’s The Rake’s Progress, Werner Egk’s Revisor, Hans Werner Henze’s Englische Katze and Elegie für junge Liebende, as well as world premieres of Wilfried Hiller’s Waldkinder (1998), Vladimir Tarnopolski’s Wenn die Zeit über die Ufer tritt (1999), Avet Terterian’s Das Beben (2003), Johannes Maria Staud’s Berenice (2004), and Munich premieres of Dieter Schnebel’s Majakowskis Tod (2005) and Luigi Nono’s Intolleranza 1960 (2007).

A distinct line was the BallettTheater München led by Philip Taylor, which developed a unique repertoire during Schultz’s eleven years at the Gärtnerplatz.

Following August Everding’s death in 1999, Schultz became acting president and from September 1999 to summer 2007 vice president of the Bavarian Theatre Academy August Everding at the Prinzregententheater. At the request of Wolfgang Wagner and the board of trustees, he supported the management of the Bayreuth Festival as an honorary freelance collaborator from 2002 to 2008.

=== Writing career ===
He was also an editor and author of contributions and books. Since 1974, he had given lectures on music and theatre and taught at the Goethe University Frankfurt, LMU Munich and Heidelberg University. In 2000, he was appointed professor at the City University of Applied Sciences in Bremen. From 2006/07, he also taught at the Bavarian Theatre Academy in connection with LMU Munich. In autumn 2009, he was visiting professor at the Department of Germanic Studies at Indiana University in Bloomington (USA).

=== Acting career ===
Occasionally, Schultz appeared as an actor, notably in Loriot’s comedy film Ödipussi (1988), in a role written for him. He had previously collaborated with Loriot in 1980 and 1982 for anniversaries of the Wittelsbach dynasty and the Berlin Philharmonic. From 2001, he also recited Loriot’s texts for Ring in One Evening and Bernstein’s Candide, published in 2010 on DVD.

In 2012, he performed with baritone Michael Volle, actor Hartmut Volle and pianist Sophie Raynaud in a Brahms-Mahler programme. In March 2014 he read works by Karl Kraus at the Jewish Community Centre in Munich.

==== TV acting ====
He conceived and participated in TV documentaries about Mieczysław Horszowski (WDR, 1989), Hans Hotter (BR, 1999), and Bayreuth Primadonnen (BR, 1997), a discussion with Martha Mödl, Astrid Varnay, and Birgit Nilsson. He also worked as dramaturge for live TV broadcasts of Der Rosenkavalier under Carlos Kleiber (1979) and Die Entführung aus dem Serail under Karl Böhm (1980), and introduced Bernstein’s Tristan und Isolde (1981).

=== Memberships ===
Schultz was a member of the German Academy of the Performing Arts and the Free Academy of the Arts Rhine-Neckar. In 2004, he joined the European Academy of Sciences and Arts. He served on various boards, including the Jürgen Ponto Foundation (2001–2012) and the Eugen-Biser-Stiftung Munich. From 2008, he was a board member of the Foundation for Cultural Promotion, and from 2011 of the Eugen Jochum Foundation. In October 2012, he was elected chairman of the Friends of the Chair for Jewish History and Culture at LMU Munich.

From 2010 to 2013, at the invitation of editor Rachel Salamander, Schultz contributed occasionally to Literarische Welt, the literary supplement of the newspaper Die Welt.

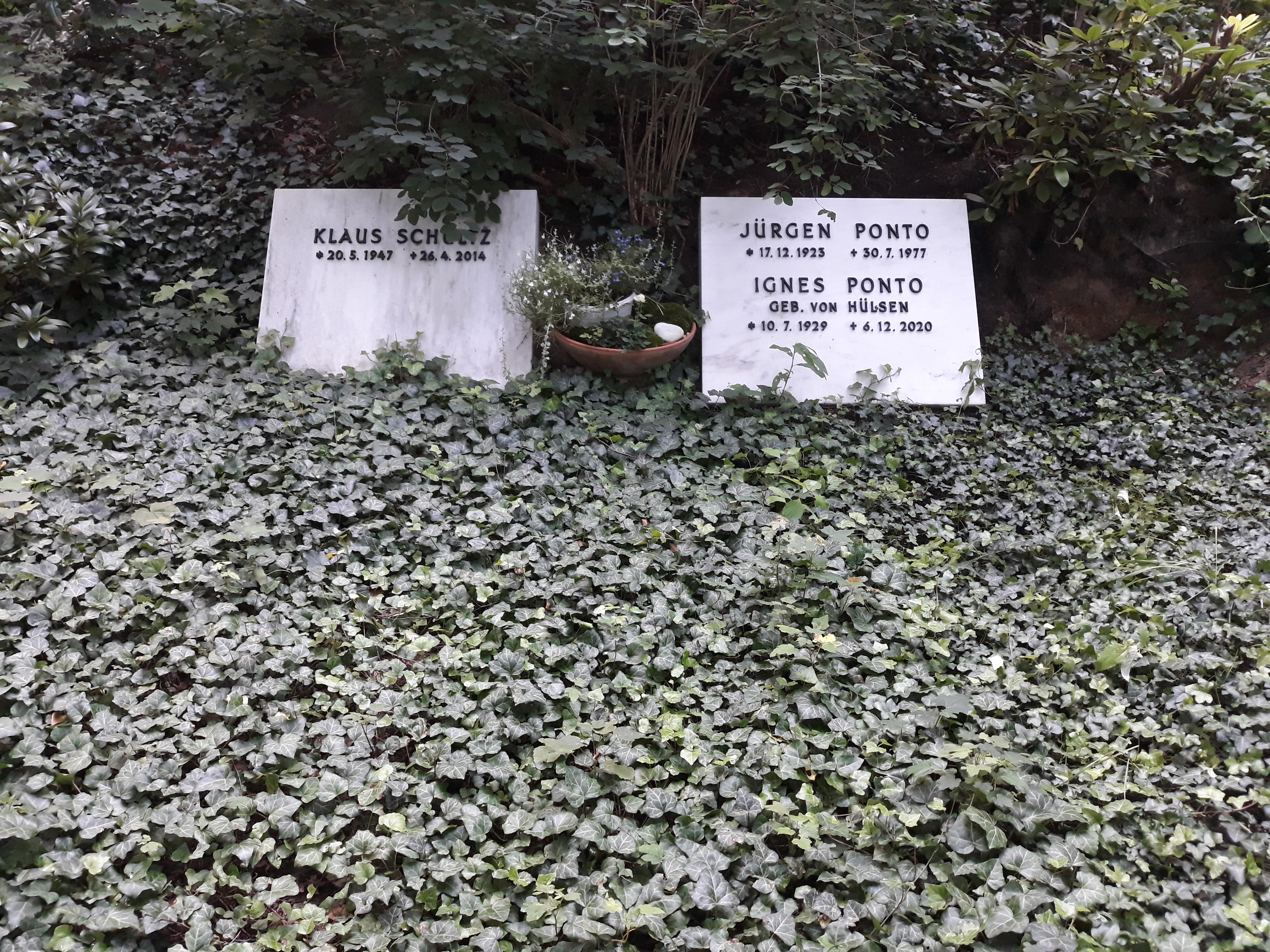
Klaus Schultz's grave (right), next to that of his parents-in-law Jürgen Ponto and Ignes, at the Heerstraße Cemetery in Berlin-Westend.

In 2011, he curated Augen auf: Musik at the Munich Gasteig’s 25th anniversary, a series combining film portraits, live music, and discussions.

== Later life and death ==
Having suffered from ill health, Klaus Schultz died on 26 April 2014 in Munich at the age of almost 67. The funeral took place on 21 May 2014 at the Cuvilliés Theatre in Munich. He was buried in the Heerstraße Cemetery in Berlin-Westend (grave location: I-Erb.-15/15A/15B).

== Personal life ==
Schultz was married to Corinna Ponto, former opera singer and daughter of banker Jürgen Ponto, who was murdered by the Red Army Faction. They had two sons, Yorck and David.

== Honours ==
- 1996: Honorary member of the Friends of the National Theatre Mannheim
- 1997: Honorary presidency member of the Friends of the National Theatre Munich
- 2005: Bavarian Constitution Medal
- 2007: Wilhelm-Hausenstein Award, Bavarian Academy of Fine Arts
- 2008: Bavarian Order of Merit
- 2010: Bavarian Maximilian Order for Science and Art
- 2011: Paul Harris Fellow (Rotary Foundation)
- 2014: Honorary member of the Staatstheater am Gärtnerplatz

== Literature ==
- Dieter Borchmeyer: Elf Jahre Elfenjahre. Abgesang auf eine Münchener Opern-Ära. In: Rückblicke 1996–2007, Munich 2007
- Wolf-Dieter Peter: In alle Winde. Interview with Klaus Schultz. In: Die deutsche Bühne 78 (2007), no. 8.
- Dietmar N. Schmidt: Review of Klaus Schultz’s Intendancy in Munich. In: Opernwelt, August 2007.

== Publications ==
- Provisional bibliography of the writings of Theodor W. Adorno. In: Th. W. Adorno zum Gedächtnis. Frankfurt a. M.: Suhrkamp 1971.
- With Peter Mussbach: Programme booklet for Puccini’s Gianni Schicchi (Munich, 1972)
- With Peter Mussbach: Irrgarten Parsifal (Frankfurt, 1973)
- Editor and designer of opera programme booklets in Frankfurt (1973–1977), Munich (1977–1982), and Berlin Philharmonic (1980–1984).
- Editor of publications of Aachen (1984–1992), Mannheim (1992–1996), and Gärtnerplatztheater (1996–2007)
- Mahler-Ansichten (Bonn, 1975)
- Felix Mendelssohn Bartholdy. Exhibition catalogue, Frankfurt Opera, 1975.
- Hans Werner Henze. Exhibition, Bonn, 1976.
- Baden-Baden Music Days 1927–1929. SWF and Baden-Baden Theatre, 1977.
- With Peter Mario Katona: The Frankfurt Opera 1968/69–1976/77. Frankfurt 1977.
- Karl Böhm at the Bavarian State Opera. Munich 1978; enlarged edition 1981.
- Editor: Lorenzo da Ponte, The Marriage of Figaro. Marbach 1978.
- Yehudi Menuhin and the Berlin Philharmonic Orchestra. Berlin 1979.
- Munich theatre posters 1807–1982. Munich 1982.
- The Bavarian State Opera 1977–1982. Munich 1982.
- Philharmonic Almanac I. Berlin Philharmonic, 1982.
- With Peter Girth and Uwe Schendel: The Berlin Philharmonic. Berlin 1982.
- With Peter Girth and Uwe Schendel: Philharmonic Museum. Berlin 1982.
- With Peter Girth: Philharmonic Almanac II. Berlin Philharmonic, 1983.
- Co-editor of Adorno’s Musical Writings V and VI (1984)
- Editor: Aribert Reimann’s LEAR – The Path of a New Opera. Munich 1984.
- Four years that count double. In: Mannheim and its National Theatre. Mannheim 1998.
- Rückblicke. Staatstheater am Gärtnerplatz 1996–2007. Munich 2007.
- Open to listening. The conductor Christoph von Dohnányi. Hamburg 2010.
