= Ivan Rebroff =

German singer (1931–2008)

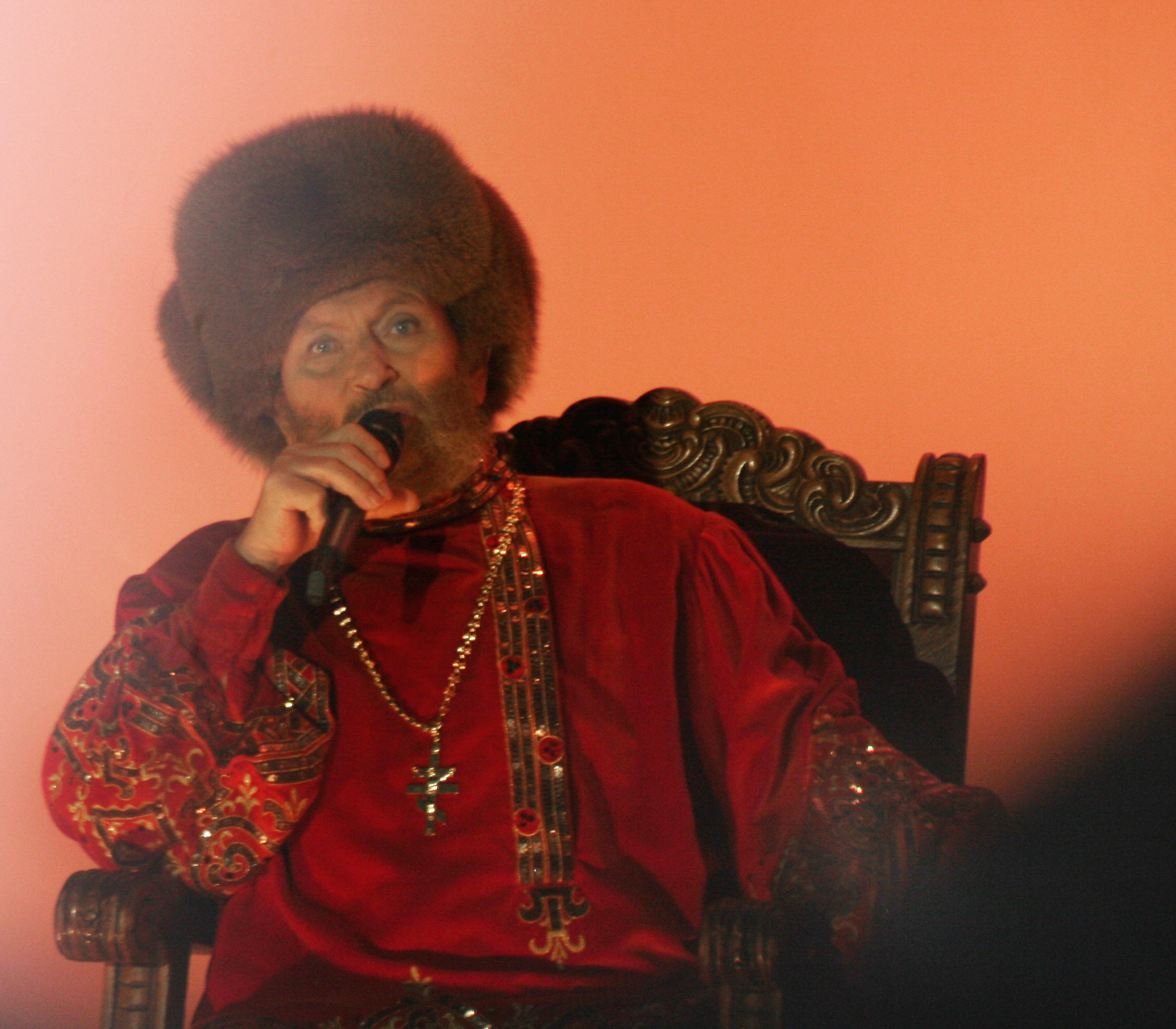
- Rebroff in 2006

Background information
- Born: Hans Rolf Rippert; 31 July 1931; Berlin, Germany
- Died: 27 February 2008 (aged 76) Frankfurt am Main, Germany
- Genres: International music, folk music
- Occupation: Singer
- Years active: 1967–2008
- Height: 6 ft 7 in (201 cm)

Ivan Rebroff (born Hans Rolf Rippert; 31 July 1931 – 27 February 2008) was a German vocalist, allegedly of Russian ancestry, who rose to prominence for his distinct and extensive vocal range of four octaves, ranging "from a low F to a high F, one and a quarter octaves above C". An imposing figure on stage, usually bearded and dressed in Cossack clothing, his presence was enhanced by his height, being over 2 metres tall.

== Early life ==
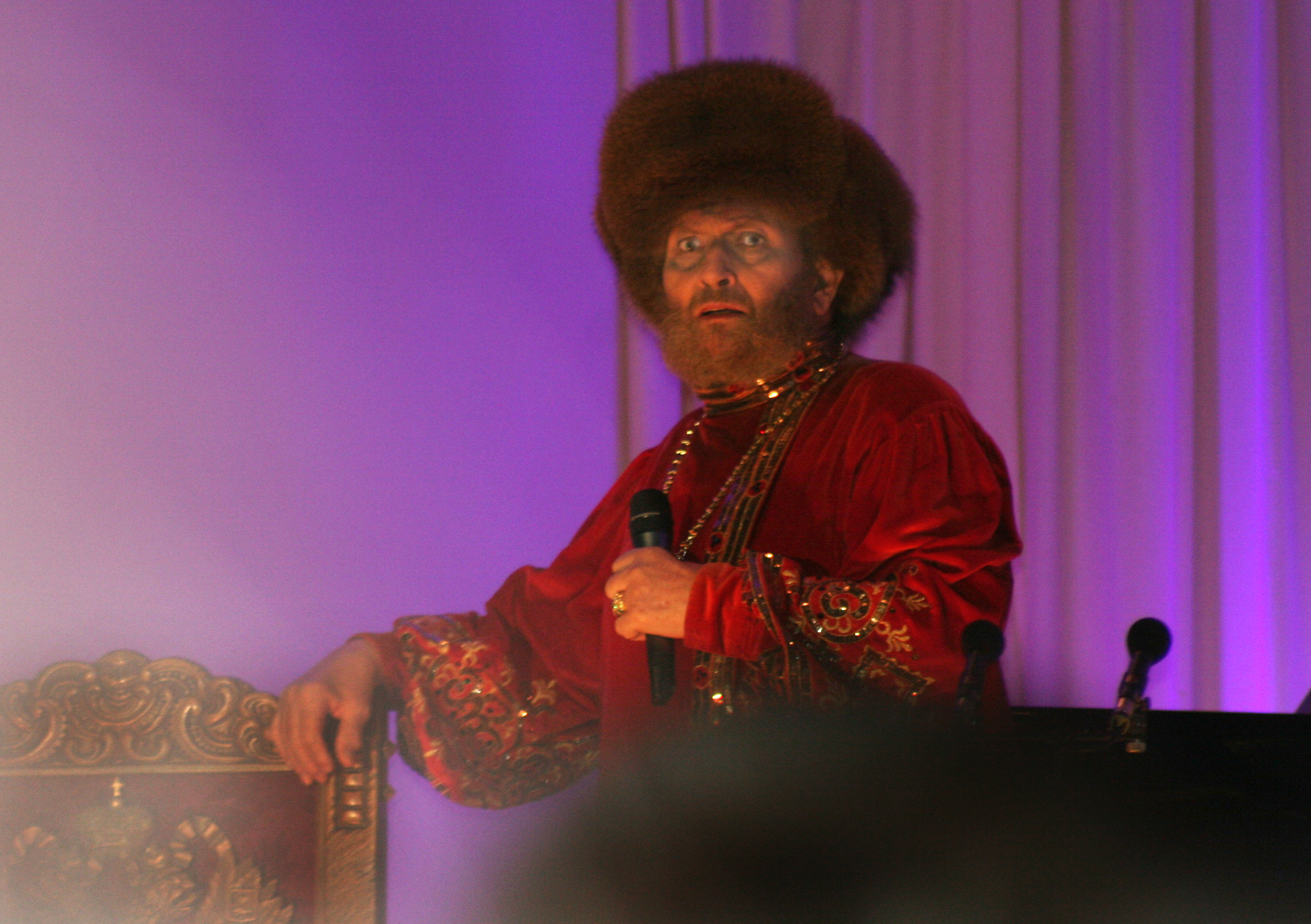
Rebroff performing in 2006

Rebroff was born on 31 July 1931 in Berlin (prematurely, he asserted, at seven months, on a train platform) as Hans Rolf Rippert to German parents. His parents were Paul Rippert, an engineer born in 1897 in Liebenwerda, and Luise Fenske, born in the city of Bromberg (now Bydgoszcz, Poland). He claimed Russian descent, and while often disputed, this has never been totally refuted. In a 1989 interview with Izvestia, he said "according to documents I am Ivan Pavlovich Rebroff" (Russian: Иван Павлович Ребров).

== Career ==
He studied singing at the Hochschule für Musik und Theater Hamburg. Although his knowledge and pronunciation of Russian was imperfect, he became famous for singing Russian folk songs, but also performed opera, light classics and folk songs from many other countries. He was known on stage for his gusto. He performed over 6,000 concerts in his career, including a two-year seven-day-a-week stint at the Théâtre Marigny in Paris, singing and acting, among other greats, the role of Tevye in Fiddler on the Roof. When he was well into his seventies, Rebroff still performed 13 concerts in 21 days on an Australian tour.

Rebroff described himself as international, the "connection between East and West". He was named an honorary citizen of the Greek Sporades island of Skopelos, his domicile.

As well as being a singer, he was at least a reasonable violinist and keyboardist (he is pictured playing a church organ but may have also played the piano). Rebroff sang and was able to converse to a lesser or greater extent in several languages in addition to his native German; Russian, French, Italian, English, and Greek.

He died aged 76 in Frankfurt on 27 February 2008, after a long illness. Four days after his death, his brother Horst Rippert, who is nine years his senior (and by his own unsubstantiated accounts shot down Antoine de Saint-Exupéry during World War II), claimed part of Rebroff's vast fortune.

== Personal life ==
Rebroff was gay, but did not share this widely.

== LP discography ==
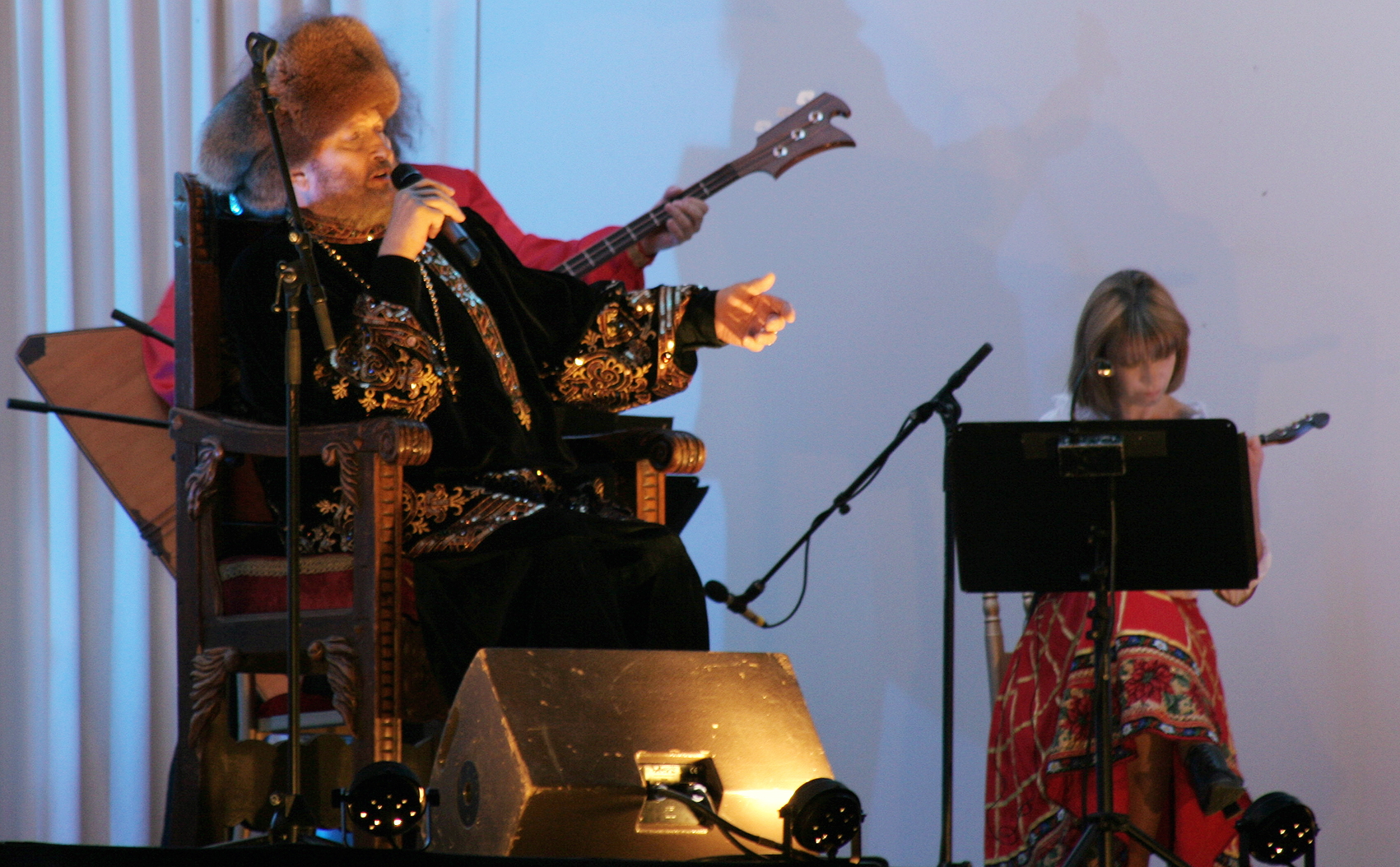
Rebroff performing in 2006

1967
Volksweisen aus dem alten Russland (Folk Songs from Old Russia)
1968
Volksweisen aus dem alten Russland 2 (Folk Songs from Old Russia Volume II)
Original Russische Liebeslieder
Na Sdarowje (Iwan Rebroff Singt Weisen Von Vodka Und Wein)
Slawische Seele (Compilation album shared with Tatjana Iwanow and Dunja Rajter)
1969
Beim Klang der Balalaika, and in French Au son des Balalaikas
Favourites from Mother Russia
Abendglocken (compilation)
Russische Weihnacht mit Ivan Rebroff
Ivan Rebroff (includes "Lara's Theme" from Doctor Zhivago)
A Russian Christmas
Un Violon sur le toit (Original Paris Cast Album of Fiddler on the Roof)
Russische Party (live album)
Festliche Weihnacht (with Regensburger Domspatzen boys' choir)
A Festive Christmas (Festliche Weihnacht re-issue)
1970
Kosaken müssen reiten (German-language versions)
1971
The Best of Ivan Rebroff (compilation)
Somewhere My Love (English-language versions)
Ivan Rebroff Sing Vir Ons (South African album – Gold Disk Award)
Vir Jou Suid-Afrika (South African album)
Ivan Rebroff (Opera)
Kalinka (soundtrack from the 1971 film L'Homme qui vient de la nuit, German: Das Lied der Balalaika)
Mein Russland, du bist schön (German-language versions)
Starportrait (compilation)
Zwischen Donau und Don (with Dunja Rajter)
1972
Erinnerungen an Russland (Russian-language versions)
The Best of Ivan Rebroff Volume II (compilation)
Lieder der Welt (Folk songs from around the world)
1973
Mein altes Russland (lushly arranged Russian folk songs)
25 Greatest Russian Melodies (compilation with Tatjana Iwanow (2 duets))
20 Greatest Hits (New Zealand compilation release)
1974
Russische Party 2 (live album)
Memories of Russia
1975
Ivan Rebroff at Carnegie Hall (live)
Reich' mir die Hand
Russische Lieder von Liebe und Tod (featuring Herbert Seidemann)
1976
Komm mit nach Hellas (German-language versions of Greek songs)
Die Fledermaus conducted by Carlos Kleiber – Deutsche Grammophon – with Hermann Prey, Júlia Várady, Lucia Popp, René Kollo, Bernd Weikl, Benno Kusche – Bavarian State Opera Chorus and Bavarian State Orchestra
1977
Mitternacht in Moskau (also known as Midnight in Moscow, with German and Russian versions)
1979
Ave Maria (Festliche Abendmusik Mit Ivan Rebroff)
Die Ivan Rebroff Versameling (compilation of South African tracks)
Midnight in Moscow (Russian-language version), in German Mitternacht in Moskau
1980
Zauber einer großen Stimme – 20 unvergängliche Welterfolge
Die schönsten Lieder dieser Welt (Ivan Rebroff singt 20 unvergängliche Melodien)
Katharina und Potemkin (TV musical/operetta)
The Ivan Rebroff Collection (compilation)
Der Zarewitsch (operetta)
1981
Melodien für Millionen (Ihr Wunschkonzert Mit Den Schönsten Liedern Der Welt)
1982
Ivan Rebroff (Signal record label release)
Zauber Grosse Stimmen (8xLP compilation featuring Alexandra)
1983
Taiga-Träume (Neue Lieder Und Geschichten Aus Dem Alten Rußland)
Russie Éternelle (French release)
Die Schönsten Melodien
1984
In Diesen Heiligen Hallen
1985
Live in Concert - Recitals 1968-1982
Meine Lieblingsmelodien (Swiss compilation release)
Schenk Mir Einen Wodka Ein - 16 Seiner Großen Erfolge (compilation release)
1986
Ich Bete An Die Macht Der Liebe (Festliche Abendmusik Mit Ivan Rebroff Vol. II)
Ivan Rebroff Singt Heitere Klassik
...Und Friede Auf Erden
1988
Zauber Einer Großen Stimme (Seine Größten Welterfolge)
Zijn Grootste Successen (Dutch compilation release)
1989
Perestroika - Glasnost
The Best of Ivan Rebroff - Ses Plus Grands Succès (English/French release)
1990
The Very Best of Ivan Rebroff (BBC release)
Greatest Hits (CBS release)
Stationen Einer Karriere
1991
Ses Plus Grands Succès (French release of The Very Best of Ivan Rebroff)
The Very Best of Ivan Rebroff (Volume II) (BBC release)
1992
Die Krönung Einer Großen Karriere

== CD discography ==
1976
Die Fledermaus conducted by Carlos Kleiber – Deutsche Grammophon – with Hermann Prey, Júlia Várady, Lucia Popp, René Kollo, Bernd Weikl, Benno Kusche – Bavarian State Opera Chorus and Bavarian State Orchestra
1980
Der Zarewitsch
1986
Ivan Rebroff Singt Heitere Klassik
1990
The Very Best of Ivan Rebroff
1991
The Very Best Of Ivan Rebroff (Volume II)
1996
Best of Ivan Rebroff
2002
Meine Reise um die Welt
The Great Ivan Rebroff
Ach Natascha
2003
Seine Größten Welterfolge
Golden Stars
2004
Around The World With Ivan Rebroff
2005
Stimme Aus Gold
2006
Ivan Rebroff – 75 Jahre (Meine Schönsten Lieder)

== Compilation albums ==
- Festliche Weihnachten
- Wunschkonzert
- The Art of Ivan Rebroff
- The Best of Russian Folk Songs Vol. 1
- The Best of Russian Folk Songs Vol. 2
- Erinnerungen an das letzte Jahrhundert
- Weihnachten mit Ivan Rebroff
- Die schönste Stimme Rußlands
- Kosakenträume
