= Margarita Höhenrieder =

German pianist and university professor (born 1956)

- Born: 1956 (age 69–70); Munich, Germany
- Education: Hochschule für Musik und Theater München; Peabody Conservatory of Music
- Occupations: Pianist; Academic
- Organizations: Hochschule für Musik und Theater München
- Awards: Ferruccio Busoni International Piano Competition (1981); State Prize for Young Artists of the Free State of Bavaria (1984)
- Website: www.margarita-hoehenrieder.de

Margarita Höhenrieder (born 1956) is a German classical pianist and a professor at the Hochschule für Musik und Theater München. She has performed internationally and recorded, with a focus on chamber music. She premiered compositions which Harald Genzmer dedicated to her.

== Career ==
Born in Munich, Höhenrieder studied piano with Anna Stadler and Ludwig Hoffmann in Munich, and with Leon Fleisher at the Peabody Conservatory of Music in Baltimore, US.

Höhenrieder has played as a soloist with conductors Kirill Petrenko, Claudio Abbado, Lorin Maazel, James Levine, Riccardo Chailly, and Fabio Luisi, among others, and with orchestras such as Symphonieorchester des Bayerischen Rundfunks, Münchner Philharmoniker, New York Philharmonic, Sächsische Staatskapelle Dresden, Gewandhausorchester, Mozarteum Orchester Salzburg, and Mahler Chamber Orchestra.

She was a friend of composer Harald Genzmer, who dedicated his Konzert für Klavier, Trompete und Streicher (Concerto for Piano, Trumpet and Strings) to her. She premiered the work with trumpeter Guy Touvron and the Württembergisches Kammerorchester Heilbronn (WKH). Genzmer composed his last major work for her, Wie ein Traum am Rande der Unendlichkeit (Like a dream near infinity) for piano and flute, which she premiered in Rome in 2009 with Emmanuel Pahud. On the occasion of the bicentenary of Friedrichshafen in July 2011, Höhenrieder and the WKH performed a concert at the Dornier Museum among the aircraft.

She has performed and recorded chamber music also with Kit Armstrong, cellist Julius Berger, pianist Alfred Brendel, clarinetist Eduard Brunner, the Gewandhaus Quartet, clarinetist Sabine Meyer, percussionist Peter Sadlo, and Reiner Wehle, among others.

In 1984, Höhenrieder was appointed professor of piano at the Hochschule für Musik Würzburg, and succeeded Ludwig Hoffmann in that position at the Musikhochschule München in 1991. Her students include Milana Chernyavska.

== Awards ==
In 1981, Höhenrieder won first prize at the Ferruccio Busoni International Piano Competition in Bolzano. She received the Staatlicher Förderungspreis für junge Künstler des Freistaates Bayern (State Prize for Young Artists of the Free State of Bavaria) in 1984.

== Recordings ==
Höhenrieder has recorded CDs and DVD. A reviewer of her recording of chamber music with soloist from the Staatskapelle Dresden, which included Poulenc's Sextet and a sextet by Ludwig Thuille noted her "approach with an engaging freshness and warmth that feels spontaneous".

=== CDs ===
- Sextets by Thuille, Poulenc, Françaix – Kammerharmonie der Sächsischen Staatskapelle Dresden. Solo Musica 2016
- Inspired by Mozart – with Julius Berger (cello). Wyastone Estate Ltd., 2015
- Quintets for winds and piano by Mozart and Beethoven – winds of Staatskapelle Dresden. Hänssler Classic 2015
- Piano concertos by Mozart and Schumann, Chopin variations – Fabio Luisi conductor, Wiener Symphoniker. Solo Musica, 2014
- Harald Genzmer: "Wie ein Traum am Rande der Unendlichkeit" – World Premiere, works for flute and piano, Emmanuel Pahud. Solo Musica, 2011
- Chopin, Liszt, Sonatas b-minor. Margarita Höhenrieder, Klavier. Solo Musica, 2010
- Schumann Klavierquintett, Mendelssohn Bartholdy Sextett – Gewandhaus-Quartett, Christian Ockert (double bass). Solo Musica, 2009
- In Memoriam – Kammermusik von Harald Genzmer (1909–2007) – Julius Berger, Peter Sadlo (percussion). Solo Musica, 2008
- Harald Genzmer – Werke für Marimba/Vibraphon – Aulos (Klassik Center Kassel), 2006
- Clara & Robert Schumann, Piano Concertos – Johannes Wildner, conductor, Neue Philharmonie Westfalen. BMG Ariola Classics, 2002
- Harald Genzmer: Concerto for Trumpet, Piano and Strings – Guy Touvron, Württembergisches Kammerorchester Heilbronn, Jörg Faerber. Thorofon (Bella Musica Edition), 2001
- Camille Saint-Saëns, Messager, Chausson, Debussy, Roussel, Ravel, Poulenc, Françaix – Kompositionen für Klarinette und Klavier – Eduard Brunner, clarinet. Coproduction with Bayerischer Rundfunk. Calig (Weltbild Verlag), 1994
- Clarinet Trios: Carl Phillipp Emanuel Bach, Harald Genzmer, Ludwig van Beethoven – Eduard Brunner, Julius Berger. Melisma Musikproduktion Wiesbaden, 1994
- Recital Margarita Höhenrieder – Konzerte von Mozart, Schubert, Genzmer – conducted by Peter Lücker, Konzertensemble Salzburg. Bayer Records 1991
- Joseph Suder: Piano Concerto – Symphonieorchester des Bayerischen Rundfunks, Jun´ichi Hirokami. Calig 1989

=== DVDs ===
- Beethoven Piano Concertos No. 2 & No. 3. – Leon Fleisher, conductor. Accentus Music 2016
- Beethoven Piano Concerto No. 3. – Württembergisches Kammerorchester Heilbronn, Leon Fleisher, conductor. Max-Littmann-Saal, Bad Kissingen. Accentus Music 2015
- Beethoven Piano Concerto No. 2. – Kammerphilharmonie Amadé, Leon Fleisher, conductor. UNESCO site Zeche Zollverein, Essen. Accentus Music 2014
- Beethoven Piano Concerto No. 1. – Mahler Symphony No. 1. – Staatskapelle Dresden, Fabio Luisi, conductor. Gasteig, Munich. EMO 2008
