= Julius Berger (cellist) =

German cellist, musicologist and academic

- Born: 1954 (age 70–71); Augsburg, Germany
- Education: Musikhochschule München; Mozarteum; University of Cincinnati
- Occupations: Cellist; Academic
- Organizations: Musikhochschule Würzburg; Leopold Mozart Centre; Eckelshausener Musiktage; Asiago Festival
- Website: www.juliusberger.de

Julius Berger (born 1954) is a German cellist, musicologist and an academic of chamber music and cello at the Leopold Mozart Centre of the Augsburg University. He recorded the sonatas and concertos by Luigi Boccherini, but also contemporary music by John Cage, Toshio Hosokawa, Adriana Hölszky and Sofia Gubaidulina. He is the artistic director of music festivals.

== Career ==
Born in Augsburg, Berger studied at the Musikhochschule München with Walter Reichardt and Fritz Kiskalt, then at the Mozarteum in Salzburg with Antonio Janigro, before becoming his assistant from 1979 to 1982. He studied further at the University of Cincinnati with Zara Nelsova, and in a master class of Mstislav Rostropovich. He was appointed professor at the Musikhochschule Würzburg at age 28, as one of Germany's youngest professors at the time. From 1992, he has held a class at the Internationale Sommerakademie Mozarteum Salzburg.

Berger is focused on the rediscovery of the complete works by Luigi Boccherini and Leonardo Leo. He recorded all cello concertos by Boccherini in 1992, including a twelfth concerto which was then recently rediscovered, on Boccherini's own Stradivari instrument. Berger is interested in the oldest music written for cello by Pietro degli Antonii and Domenico Gabrielli. He has also played and recorded chamber music by Paul Hindemith, Ernst Bloch, Max Bruch, Richard Strauss, Robert Schumann and Edward Elgar to international recognition.

In the field of contemporary music, Berger recorded works by John Cage, Toshio Hosokawa, Adriana Hölszky and Sofia Gubaidulina. He is the artistic director of the festivals Eckelshausener Musiktage and Asiago Festival in Italy. He authored Irritationskraft in the Hindemith-Jahrbuch 1992, Einheit in der Vielfalt - Vielfalt in der Einheit in the research magazine of the Mainz University in 1998, and Zeit und Ewigkeit for Cardinal Karl Lehmann in 2001, among others.

Berger has taught at the Musikhochschule Augsburg from 2000, serving as the deputy director of its Leopold Mozart Centre from 2010. He plays a cello built by Andrea Amati in 1566.

== Recordings ==
- Inspired by BACH (with Oliver Kern), works by Johann Sebastian Bach, Johannes X. Schachtner, Johannes Brahms, Ludwig van Beethoven and Max Reger
- Inspired by MOZART (with Margarita Höhenrieder). Variations from Die Zauberflöte, Große Sonate für Violoncello und Klavier E-Dur op. 19, Sonate für Violoncello und Klavier Nr. 3 A-Dur op. 69
- Luigi Boccherini: Cello Sonatas, vol. 1, 2 and 3
- The Unknown Beethoven: Works for Violoncello and Piano (2011)
- Giuseppe Tartini: Cellokonzert in A-Dur und D-Dur, Sinfonia pastorale, Sinfonie D-Dur. (with Süddeutsches Kammerorchester Pforzheim)
- Johann Sebastian Bach: Sechs Suiten für Violoncello Solo - Julius Berger, violoncello, 1997, WERGO – WER 4041-2, WERGO – 280 041-2
