= Lukas Ammann =

Swiss actor (1912-2017)

- Born: 29 September 1912; Basel, Switzerland
- Died: 3 May 2017 (aged 104); Munich, Germany
- Occupations: Film and television actor
- Years active: 1939–2015

Lukas Ammann (29 September 1912 – 3 May 2017) was a Swiss actor who appeared mainly in German and Swiss films and television shows. He continued to work steadily for over 60 years. He is best known for his title role in the German television series Graf Yoster.

== Early life ==
Lukas Ammann's mother was a singer and his father a painter. After he saw Schiller's The Robbers at grammar school in Basel, he aspired to be an actor. Starting in 1933 he attended the acting school of Max Reinhardt in Berlin. In 1934, he left Germany with Heinrich Gretler for Switzerland. Because of his Jewish mother, he was discriminated against even in Switzerland. In the beginning he worked in St. Gallen and later at the Schauspielhaus Zürich with Therese Giehse. In 1948, he participated under Kurt Hirschfeld in the role of the attorney in the premiere of Herr Puntila und sein Knecht Matti. After World War II, Ammann belonged to the Ensemble of the theatre Kleine Freiheit in Munich. Guest performances and tours led him to stages in Austria, Scandinavia and the USA.

== Cinematic career ==
Ammann began his film career in the 1939 Swiss movie Constable Studer after the novel of Friedrich Glauser, starring Heinrich Gretler. Beginning in the 1950s, he was successful especially on German Television. In 1961, he played in the series Gestatten, mein Name ist Cox with Günter Pfitzmann and Paul Edwin Roth. In 1963, he was one of the jurors in 12 Angry Men, which was a remake of the American film 12 Angry Men for German television.

In 1966, Ammann played in the first color-TV series Adrian der Tulpendieb. On top of that he appeared in series like Das Kriminalmuseum, Die fünfte Kolonne, Der Forellenhof and Der Kommissar. In 1973, the horror movie Mark of the Devil Part II depicted him as tortured to death.

Between 1967 and 1977 he achieved great popularity in his most famous role in the German detective series Graf Yoster, where he played the main part of the same name.

From 1994 to 2000, Ammann played a family patriarch in the television series Die Fallers. In 1998, he played a purported survivor of the Holocaust in Dani Levy's film Meschugge. In 2005, at age 92, he played Abi Goldstein in Micha Lewinsky's Swiss short film Herr Goldstein. It won an award for best Swiss short film at the Locarno International Film Festival. Ammann lent his voice in German dubbing Peter Sellers (in John and Julie, 1955) and Lucky Luke (in the animated film Daisy Town, 1971).

In 2013, he worked again, aged 101, with the director Ronnie R. Vogt on the movie Reunion Solitaire.

== Personal life ==
Lukas Ammann lived in Munich. After two failed marriages, he married German soprano Liselotte Ebnet in 1959; she died in 2009. As of 2015, he still ran his household by himself and also drove his car. He died in May 2017 at the age of 104 from complications from surgery.

== Filmography ==
Year	Title	Role	Notes
1939	Constable Studer		
1940	Verena Stadler		
1940	Dilemma	Sterner	
1941	Bieder der Flieger	Direktor der Gnomefabrik	
1943	Menschen, die vorüberziehen	Blacky	
1952	Palace Hotel	Dr. Suvalà	
1955	Bel Ami	Le ministre Laroche-Mathieu	
1957	Weißer Holunder		
1957	The Devil Strikes at Night	Pflichtverteidiger von Keun	
1958	I Was All His	Dessouki	
1959	Heiße Ware	Erwin Wanka	
1959	The Ideal Woman	Butler	Uncredited
1959	Der Schatz vom Toplitzsee	Jugoslawischer Grenz-Leutnant	
1959	Hast noch der Söhne ja...?	Coiffeur Mani	
1963	Der grüne Kakadu	François, Vicomte von Nogeant	
1963	Ferien vom Ich		
1963	12 Angry Men	Juror 12	TV movie
1966	Congress of Love	Von Gentz	
1967	Day of Anger	Judge Cutcher	
1967-1977	Graf Yoster	Graf Yoster	62 episodes, leading role
1968	Jet Generation	Inspektor Arnold	
1968	The Killer Likes Candy	Faoud	
1970	Dällebach Kari	Basler Nationalrat	
1970	A Big Grey-Blue Bird	Cinque	
1972	Massagesalon der jungen Mädchen	Maurice	
1973	Mark of the Devil Part II	Eminence	
1988	Klassezämekunft	Fritz Erne	
1990	Flight from Paradise	Mait	
1990	The Eighth Day	Prof. Wagner	
1994-2000	Die Fallers – Eine Schwarzwaldfamilie	Wilhelm Faller	170 episodes, leading role
1998	Meschugge	Max Weiss	
2015	Reunion Solitaire	Der ältere Herr	(final film role)

== See also ==
- List of centenarians (actors, filmmakers and entertainers)
