= Benešov nad Ploučnicí =

- Town
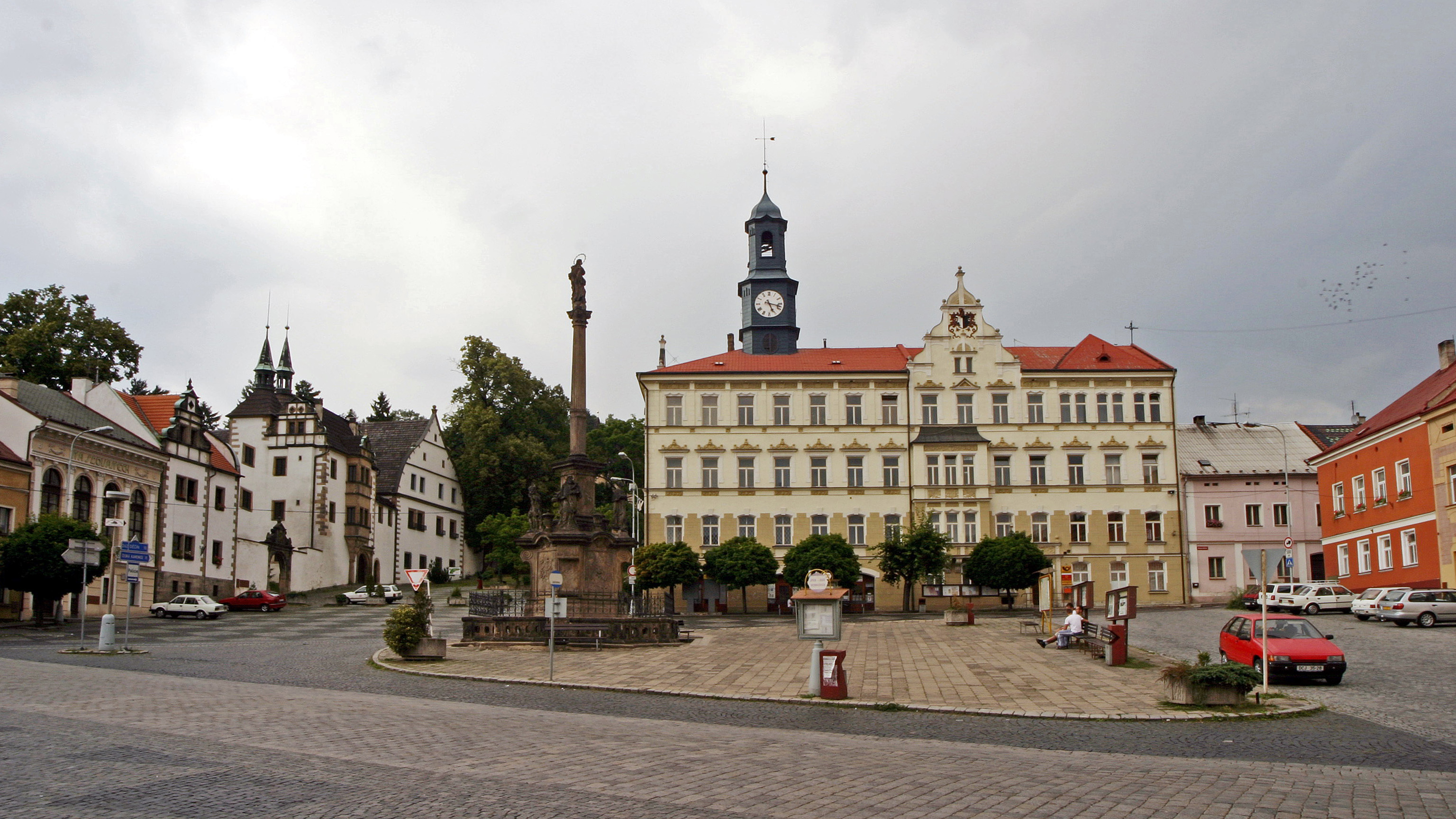
- Town square with the town hall

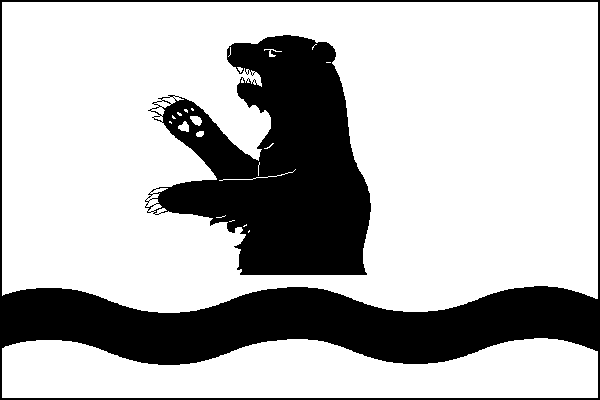
- Flag Coat of arms

- Location in the Czech Republic
- Coordinates: 50°44′27″N 14°18′23″E
- Country: Czech Republic
- Region: Ústí nad Labem
- District: Děčín
- First mentioned: 1311

Government
  - Mayor: Petr Jansa

Area
  - Total: 9.77 km^{2} (3.77 sq mi)
- Elevation: 210 m (690 ft)

Population (2026-01-01)
  - Total: 3,485
  - Density: 357/km^{2} (924/sq mi)
- Time zone: UTC+1 (CET)
  - Summer (DST): UTC+2 (CEST)
- Postal code: 407 22
- Website: www.benesovnpl.cz

Benešov nad Ploučnicí (Czech pronunciation: [ˈbɛnɛʃof ˈnat ploutʃɲɪtsiː]; German: Bensen) is a town in Děčín District in the Ústí nad Labem Region of the Czech Republic. It has about 3,500 inhabitants. The town is located on the Ploučnice River in the Central Bohemian Uplands.

Benešov nad Ploučnicí was probably founded in the 1230s. The historic town centre with the castle complex is well preserved and is protected as an urban monument zone.

== Administrative division ==
Benešov nad Ploučnicí consists of two municipal parts (in brackets population according to the 2021 census):

- Benešov nad Ploučnicí (3,486)
- Ovesná (54)

== Etymology ==
The name Benešov is derived from the personal name Beneš, meaning "Beneš's (castle/court)".

== Geography ==
Benešov nad Ploučnicí is located about 7 kilometres (4 mi) southeast of Děčín and 21 km (13 mi) northeast of Ústí nad Labem. It lies in the Central Bohemian Uplands and within the České středohoří Protected Landscape Area. The highest point is the Hlídka hill at 480 m (1,575 ft) above sea level. The Ploučnice River flows through the town.

== History ==
The first written mention of Benešov is from 1311. The town was probably founded in the 1230s. Existence of the church is first mentioned in 1352. During the Hussite Wars, the town was conquered by the Orebite army of Jan Roháč of Dubá. Half of the population was killed and the town burned down. After the war, the estate became property of the Vartenberk family.

In 1511, the Vartenberks sold Benešov to the Trčka of Lípa family. During the rule of Fridrich Trčka of Lípa in the first half of the 16th century, the town experienced its greatest development. He had rebuilt the local medieval castle into an aristocratic residence (today known as Horní Zámek) and had built a new castle for his son (today Dolní Zámek). Development continued in the second half of the 16th century, when Benešov was owned by the Salhausen family. After the last Salhausen died in 1620, the Benešov estate was divided between the Thun und Hohenstein and Clary-Aldringen families.

== Demographics ==
Historical population

Year	Pop.	±%
1869	2,267	—
1880	2,496	+10.1%
1890	3,370	+35.0%
1900	3,875	+15.0%
1910	4,089	+5.5%

Year	Pop.	±%
1921	3,800	−7.1%
1930	4,457	+17.3%
1950	3,265	−26.7%
1961	3,570	+9.3%
1970	3,630	+1.7%

Year	Pop.	±%
1980	4,758	+31.1%
1991	4,233	−11.0%
2001	4,062	−4.0%
2011	3,785	−6.8%
2021	3,540	−6.5%

Source: Censuses

== Transport ==
Benešov nad Ploučnicí is located on the railway lines Liberec–Děčín and Děčín–Rumburk.

== Sights ==
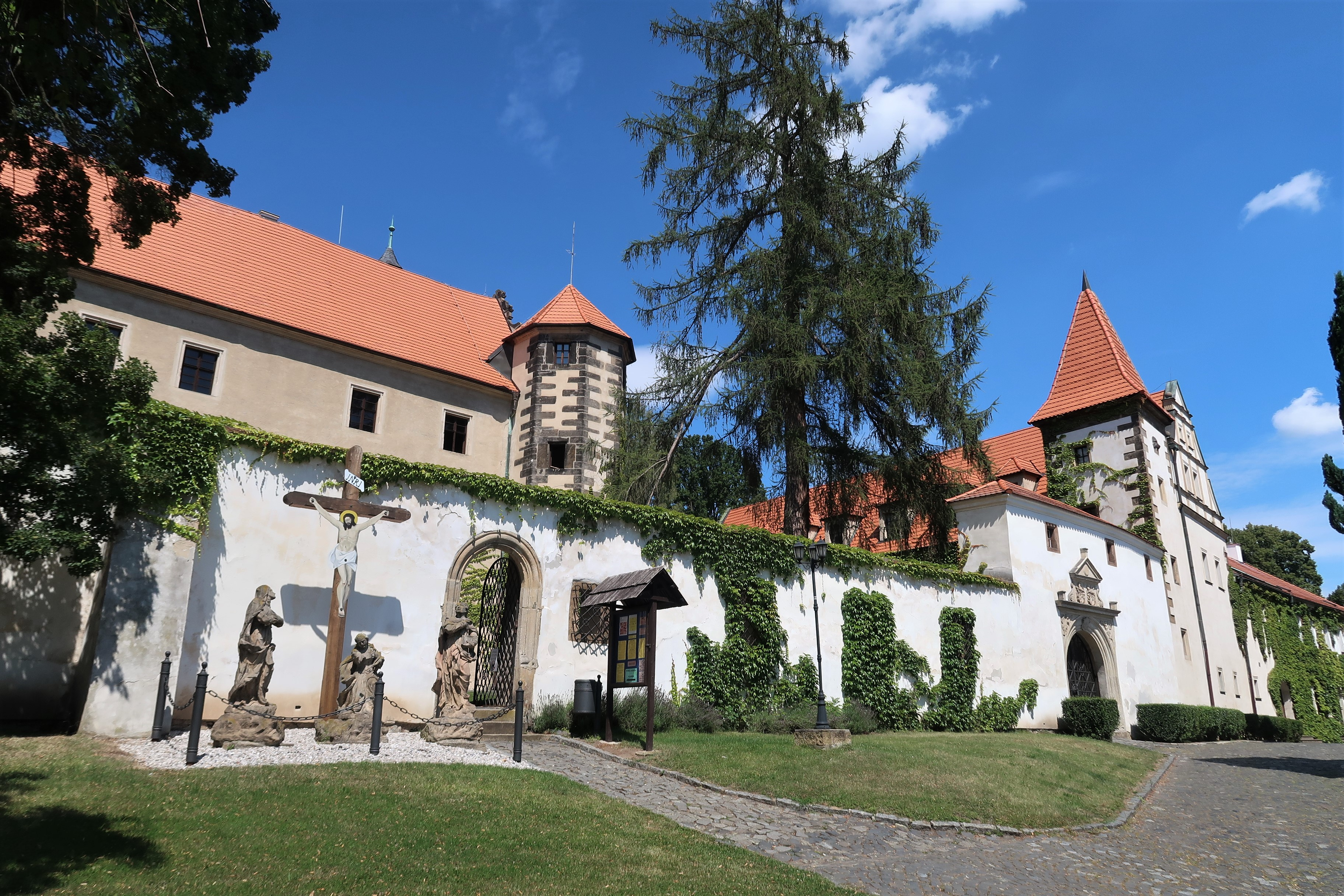
Upper Castle

The town is known for its castle complex, made up of seven buildings in the Saxon Renaissance style. It contains two castles (called Dolní Zámek and Horní Zámek – 'upper castle' and 'lower castle'), Church of the Nativity of the Virgin Mary, Chapel of the Sorrowful Mother of God, and three houses. The complex was built by the Salhausen noble family in the 16th century.

== Notable people ==
- Kurt Pscherer (1915–2000), Austrian theatre director
- Roland Ducke (1934–2005), German footballer
- Peter Ducke (born 1941), German footballer

== Twin towns – sister cities ==
Benešov nad Ploučnicí is twinned with:

- Heidenau, Germany
