= Graf Yoster =

- Also known as: Le Comte Yoster a bien l'honneur
- Genre: Crime drama
- Starring: Lukas Ammann; Wolfgang Völz; Béatrice Romand
- Composers: Eugen Thomass; Peter Fischer
- Country of origin: West Germany
- Original language: German
- No. of seasons: 5
- No. of episodes: 62

Production
- Executive producer: Ulrich Berns
- Camera setup: Hermann Gruber; Gernot Roll; Charly Steinberger; Kurt Hasse; Manfred Ensinger; Reginald Naumann; Joseph Vilsmaier
- Running time: 25 (season 4: 50)
- Production company: Bavaria Film

Original release
- Network: ARD; ORTF
- Release: September 15, 1967 – February 7, 1977

Graf Yoster gibt sich die Ehre (French title: Le comte Yoster a bien l'honneur) – which translates to English as Count Yoster has the Honour – is a television series produced between 1967 and 1976. Starring Lukas Ammann and Wolfgang Völz, the series followed the adventures of the titular aristocratic gentleman detective and his working-class butler. It was a success, in particular in West Germany and in France. Originally the show was a West German production in black-and-white but it evolved into a European co-production in colour.

== Main character ==
Lukas Ammann plays Graf (Count) Yoster, who is presented as an impeccable gentleman. He wore a traditional suit and bowler hat, and carried an umbrella, similar to John Steed in the TV series The Avengers. Although he lived in a castle in Bavaria (where, especially in the beginning, a great deal of the show was shot) he had no Bavarian accent and his appearance was as British as his Rolls-Royce.

== Sidekick ==
Wolfgang Völz played Ioan (or in German: Johann), the count's butler and chauffeur. The idea that a butler could be a hero was for German audiences already established by Butler Parker. Ioan would sometimes engage in investigations and then bring the count up to speed on the case as well as literally while he drove the count's Rolls-Royce. Moreover, he would instantly transform into the count's bodyguard whenever anybody endangered the count's well-being by trying to approach him in an inappropriate manner. Ioan applied his highly efficient close-combat techniques in a very businesslike way, completely different from any Hollywood boxing or Hong Kong martial arts style, and rather resembled the way British soldiers are taught to tackle similar situations. He was portrayed as a man of modest origins and it was repeatedly implied that he had been entangled in criminal activities before entering the count's employ.

== Genre ==
Graf Yoster was very much an amateur detective in the tradition of Dorothy Sayer's Lord Peter Wimsey. His cases were accordingly whodunits although in the end Ioan would frequently have to give him a hand disarming the detected offenders.

== Directors ==
Among the directors was Imo Moszkowicz, who had also directed a German TV series starring Josef Meinrad as Father Brown.

== Guest stars (selection) ==
- Season 1, episode 2: Ulrich Beiger
- Season 1, episode 2: Karl-Otto Alberty
- Season 1, episode 3: Klaus Schwarzkopf
- Season 2, episode 6: Helmut Fischer
- Season 1, episode 9: Christian Marin
- Season 1, episode 10: Alexander Kerst
- Season 1, episode 12: Klausjürgen Wussow
- Season 2, episode 5: Roger Tréville
- Season 2, episode 3: Gerd Baltus
- Season 2, episode 7: Michèle Girardon
- Season 2, episode 8: Günther Schramm
- Season 2, episode 8: Hans Baur
- Season 3, episode 1: Gisela Trowe
- Season 3, episode 1: Victor Beaumont
- Season 3, episode 1: Peter Dyneley
- Season 3, episode 10: Eva Pflug
- Season 3, episode 11: Frederick Jaeger
- Season 3, episode 11: Gerard Heinz
- Season 4, episode 3: Ivan Desny
- Season 4, episode 4: Dany Saval
