= Wolfgang Völz =

German actor (1930–2018)

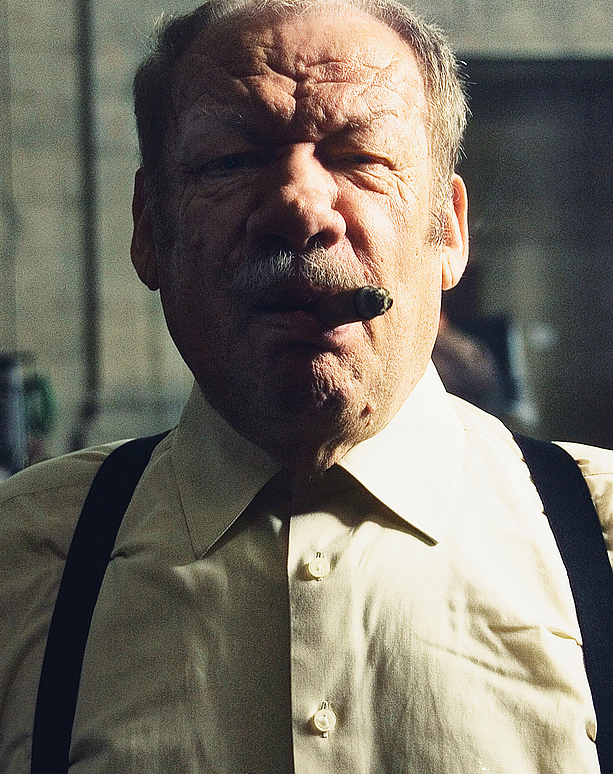
- Born: 16 August 1930; Danzig, Free City of Danzig
- Died: 2 May 2018 (aged 87); Berlin, Germany
- Occupation: Actor
- Years active: 1950–2018

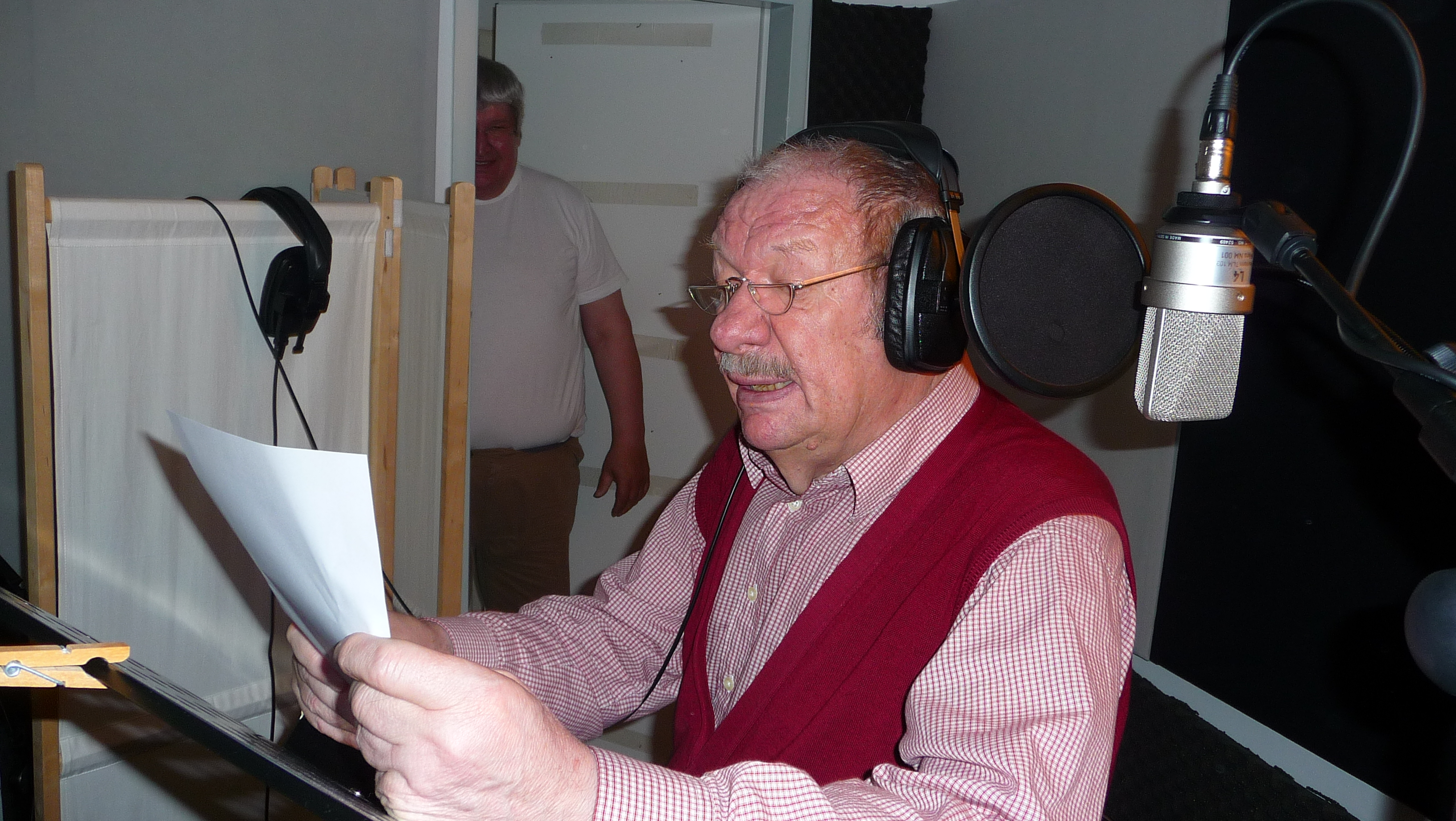
Völz working as a voice-actor in a studio in Berlin in 2010

Wolfgang Otto Völz (16 August 1930 – 2 May 2018) was a German actor and voice actor. He is known for his roles in theatre plays, TV shows, feature films (especially German films based on Edgar Wallace works) and audio dramas. He was also a very prolific voice actor.

Völz studied acting and consequently worked as a stage actor. After more than ten years of acting, including a great deal of supporting roles in feature films and TV shows, he became a popular cast member (as Lt. Mario de Monti) on Space Patrol – The Fantastic Adventures of the Spaceship Orion. He continued being successful on the TV screen by playing Ioan (German: Johann), the driver and bodyguard of Graf Yoster (and afterwards many other characters).

As a voice actor, he dubbed American stars such as Walter Matthau, Peter Falk and Mel Brooks and characters in animated films like Impy's Island.

== Selected filmography ==
- Paths in Twilight (1948)
- Fruit in the Neighbour's Garden (1956)
- The Fox of Paris (1957)
- The Girl Without Pyjamas (1957)
- Man in the River (1958)
- Carnival Confession (1960)
- The Last of Mrs. Cheyney (1961)
- My Husband, the Economic Miracle (1961)
- The Transport (1961)
- Street of Temptation (1962)
- The Lightship (1963)
- Murderer in the Fog (1964)
- Emil and the Detectives (1964)
- Raumpatrouille – Die phantastischen Abenteuer des Raumschiffes Orion (1966, TV series, 7 episodes)
- Graf Yoster (1967–1976, TV series, 62 episodes)
- Babeck (1968, TV miniseries)
- Der Kommissar: Das Messer im Geldschrank (1969, TV series episode)
- Der Kommissar: Ende eines Humoristen (1972, TV series episode)
- Der Kommissar: Drei Brüder (1974, TV series episode)
- Sonderdezernat K1: Hafenhyänen (1974, TV series episode)
- Auch ich war nur ein mittelmäßiger Schüler (1974)
- Tatort: Kassensturz (1976, TV series episode)
- Wolffs Revier: Notwehr (1992, TV series episode)
- Pumuckl und der blaue Klabauter (1994)
- Tatort: Falsches Alibi (1995, TV series episode)
- The Einstein of Sex (1999)
- Der blaue Vogel (2001, TV film)
- Der Wixxer (2004)
- Impy's Island (2006, voice)
- Neues vom Wixxer (2007)
- Mord ist mein Geschäft, Liebling (2009)
