= Liselotte Ebnet =

German actress

Liselotte Ebnet, also Ammann-Ebnet (11 February 1932 – 25 September 2009) was a German operetta soprano and mezzo soprano, as well as an actress and dubbing artist.

Ebnet was the third wife of the actor Lukas Ammann. The couple, who married in 1959, had a son who died at the age of six after a fall from a balcony. She died in Munich at age 77.

== Discography (partial) ==
- Der König und ich, Label: Philips 1966
- Und der Himmel hängt voller Geigen, Label: Sonocord 1982 (2 LPs)
- Viktoria und ihr Husar/Blume von Hawai, Label: Eurodisc 1990
- Das Feuerwerk, Label: Hamburger Archiv für Gesangskuns

== Literature ==
- Staatstheater am Gärtnerplatz (publisher): Festschrift: 100 Jahre Staatstheater am Gärtnerplatz, Munich 1965
