= Cesar Bresgen =

Austrian composer (1913–1988)

Cesar Bresgen (16 October 1913 – 7 April 1988) was an Austrian composer.

== Biography ==
He was born in Florence to Maria and August Bresgen, both artists. He spent his childhood in Zell am See, Munich, Prague, and Salzburg.

From 1930 to 1936 he studied piano, organ, conducting, and composition at the Musikhochschule München, the latter with Joseph Haas. From 1933 he moved to London, where he worked as a pianist and composer, co-operating with dancers, including Leslie Barrowes.

He married in 1936. He worked at the Munich radio station from 1936 to 1938. In 1939, he became professor of composition at the Mozarteum in Salzburg.

He was a soldier in the final years of World War II, fighting on the Western front. After the war he worked as an organist and choral director in Mittersill, Austria. There he met Anton Webern, who made a significant impression on him. In 1947, he began to teach again at the Mozarteum, eventually becoming a professor.

In 1956, he married pianist Eleonore Jorhan.

Like his friend Carl Orff, he work in extensively in pedagogy. He was also an organist and choir director.

In 1976 he won the Grand Austrian State Prize for music.

He died in Salzburg.

== Works ==
Totentanz nach Holbein for Piano & Small Orchestra (1947), written after the shock of WWII, inspired by Holbein's Totentanz woodcuts, and making extensive use of the folksong Der grimmig Tod.

=== Opera ===
- de:Krabat (1982)

== Literature ==
=== In german language ===
- "Im Anfang war der Rhythmus", Heinrichshofen Verlag 1977, ISBN 3-7959-0217-7
