= Carl Michalski =

German composer and conductor (1911–1998)

- Born: 18 January 1911; Bochum
- Died: 11 December 1998 (aged 87); Bad Wiessee
- Occupations: Conductor; Composer
- Organizations: Reichssender München; Staatstheater am Gärtnerplatz

Carl Michalski (18 January 1911 – 11 December 1998) was a German composer and conductor, focused on operetta and dance music.

== Career ==
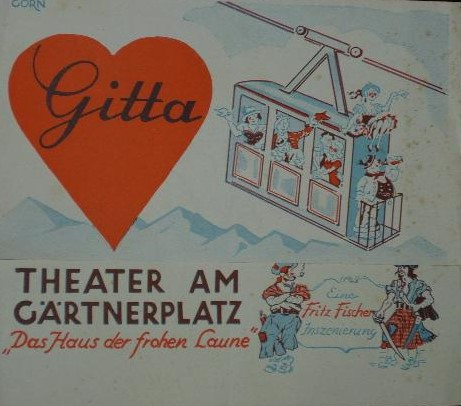
Program booklet for the operetta Gitta (1942)

Born in Bochum, Michalski was a student of Leopold Reichwein. He worked as the Kapellmeister at the Schauspielhaus Bochum from 1932 to 1934. He was conductor of the Münchener Tanzrundfunkorchester, an orchestra dedicated to swing and dance music, of the broadcaster Reichssender München from 1934 to 1938. Simultaneously, he worked from 1934 at the Staatstheater am Gärtnerplatz in Munich as arranger, conductor and composer. He collaborated with Bernhard Stimmler, composing the operetta Gitta, which premiered at the Gärtnerplatztheater on 16 May 1942, subtitled A Journey into the Blue.

All German theatres closed in summer 1944 due to World War II. From 1952, Michaslki was engaged at the reopened Gärtnerplatztheater as the "Musikalischer Oberleiter" (supervisor of music). In addition he was active in the theater administration as an assistant to the director. In 1954, he revived there the operetta Die keusche Susanne by Jean Gilbert. He conducted Cole Porter's Kiss Me, Kate in 1956 and Carl Zeller's Der Vogelhändler in 1957.

As a conductor he made several recordings with the orchestra of the Wiener Volksoper, the Tanzrundfunkorchester, the Symphonie-Orchester Kurt Graunke and the Orchester des Bayerischen Rundfunks. He made numerous recordings of operetta excerpts, such as Leo Fall's Die Rose von Stambul with Melitta Muszely and Fritz Wunderlich, Fall's Der liebe Augustin with Christine Görner and Heinz Hoppe, and Paul Abraham's Viktoria und ihr Husar with Sári Barabás and Hoppe. A recording of spirituals sung by George London, with members of the orchestra of Bayerischer Rundfunk, was reissued by Deutsche Grammophon in 2006.

Michalski died in Bad Wiessee.
