= Kurt Pscherer =

Austrian actor and theatre director

Kurt Pscherer (3 June 1915 – 13 April 2000) was an Austrian actor and theatre director.

== Life and career ==
Pscherer was born in Beneschau. Before Pscherer came to the Staatstheater am Gärtnerplatz as State Director in 1963, he was head director at the Wiesbaden Theater. His appointment to Munich "came as a surprise... without a guest production or rumours about the ministerial decision having preceded". He made a significant contribution to the sustainable profile of the company as Munich's Volksoper: "Kurt Pscherer... From the very beginning, Kurt Pscherer emphasized above all the versatility as the main argument and instrument for the growth of the Staatstheater am Gärtnerplatz to Munich's Komischer Oper profile and character of the house lie in its diversity, today musical, tomorrow great opera, the day after tomorrow classical operetta, were his words to the regular audience in 1966". In 1969, the state director founded the company's own "Gärtnerplatz Ballet". This founding was necessary "in order to be able to optimally guarantee the demanding ballet numbers in the newly established operas by Purcell, Rameau and Handel". Pscherer, who was the State director of the Staatstheater am Gärtnerplatz until 1983, also directed several operetta films for the ZDF.

Shortly before the premiere of the musical The King and I Pscherer died in the Deutsches Theater in Munich due to a heart attack.

Pscherer died at age 84.
