= Leopold Mozart Centre =

University of music in Augsburg, Germany

Coordinates: 48°20′02″N 10°53′54″E

- Leopold-Mozart-Zentrum
- Type: University of Music
- Established: 2008
- Parent institution: University of Augsburg
- Location: Augsburg, Bavaria, Germany
- Website: www.philso.uni-augsburg.de/lmz/

The Leopold Mozart Centre (German: Leopold-Mozart-Zentrum (LMZ) in Augsburg, Germany, is a university of music, founded as part of the University of Augsburg in 2008. It is located in the buildings of the former Musikhochschule as well as buildings on the university campus.

The Leopold Mozart Centre was founded after the model of the Hochschule für Musik Mainz as part of the University of Mainz. It is focused on the interchange of music and science, offering music pedagogy, music therapy, mental training and improvisation, among others. The centre offers the common artistic and pedagogical bachelor and master courses such as string instruments, keyboard instruments, voice, wind instruments, percussion, conducting and musicology. All studies include elementary courses in psychology, sociology and political studies. The Collegium Musicum offers possibilities of music making in groups such as the orchestra, choir, chamber choir, big band, and various chamber music ensembles.

== Alumni ==
Alumni include those of the former Musikhochschule.

- Benjamin Appl (born 1982), German-British lyric baritone
- Measha Brueggergosman (born 1977), opera singer and moderator
- Markus Brutscher (born 1966), operatic tenor
- Werner Egk (1901–1983), composer
- Julia Fischer (born 1983), violinist
- Robert Görl (born 1955), percussion, band DAF
- Eugen Jochum (1902–1987), conductor
- Georg Ludwig Jochum (1909–1970), conductor
- Iva Mihanovic (born 1978), opera singer
- Magda Schneider (1909–1996), actress, mother of Romy Schneider
- Irmgard Seefried (1919–1988), operatic soprano

=== Faculty ===
Faculty members include those of the former conservatory and Musikhochschule.

- Julius Berger (born 1954), chamber music and cello
- Frieder Bernius (born 1947), voice and oratorio
- Lorenzo Ghielmi (born 1959), organ literature and organ playing
- Franz Kelch (1915–2013), voice
- Emmy Lisken (born 1923), voice
- Heinrich Kaspar Schmid (1874–1953), director of the conservatory
- Rudi Spring (1962–2025), correpetition and Lied
- Edith Wiens (born 1950), voice
