= Staatstheater am Gärtnerplatz =

Opera house in Munich, Bavaria, Germany

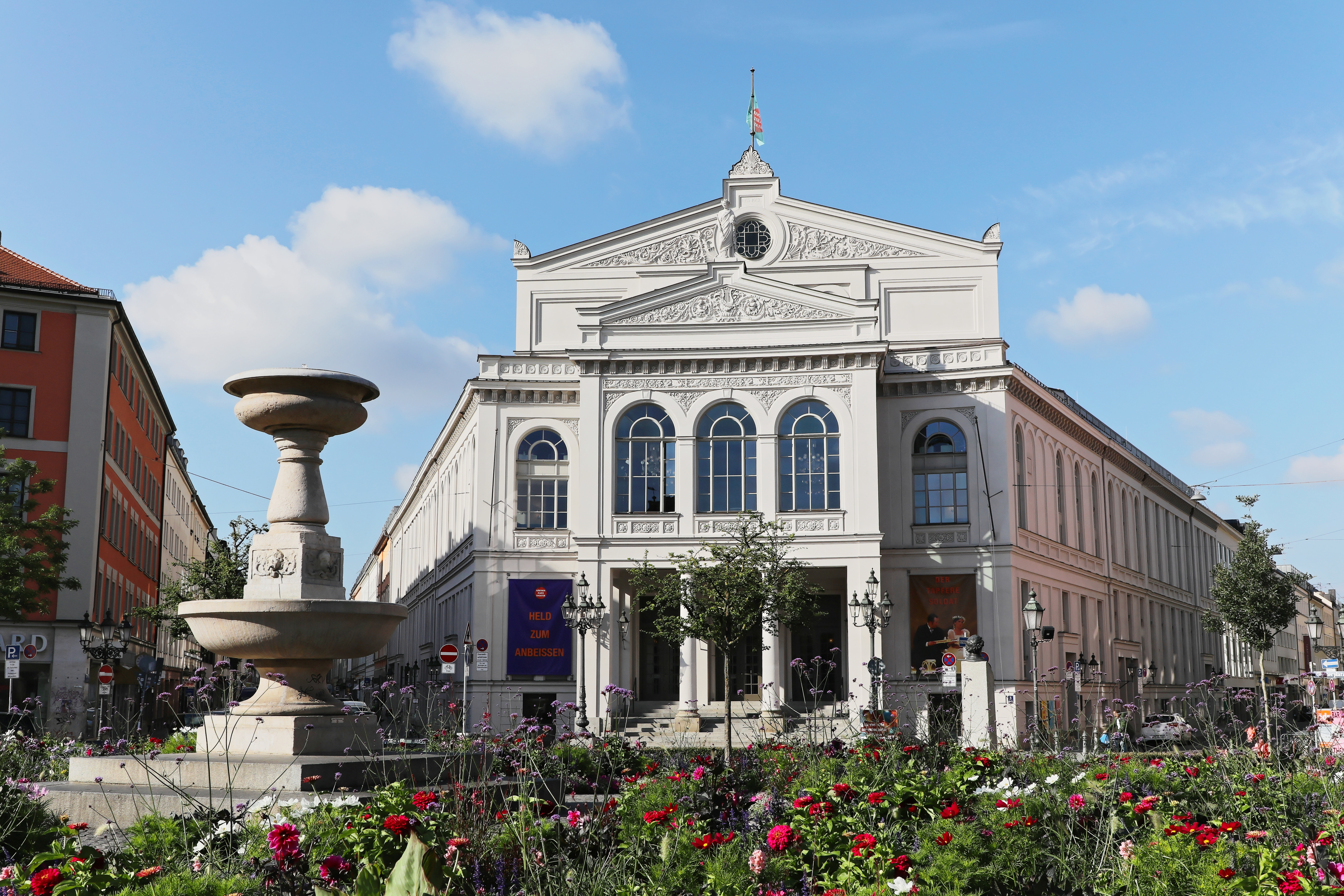
- Gärtnerplatztheater from the square, in 2018
- Interactive map of Staatstheater am Gärtnerplatz
- Address: Munich, Bavaria; Germany
- Coordinates: 48°07′52″N 11°34′32″E
- Owner: State of Bavaria
- Type: Theatre

Construction
- Opened: 4 November 1865
- Reopened: 1948; 2016
- Architect: Franz Michael Reiffenstuel

Website
- gaertnerplatztheater.de/en

The Staatstheater am Gärtnerplatz (German pronunciation: [ˈʃtaːts.teˌaːtɐ am ˈɡɛʁtnɐ.plats]; State Theatre at Gärtnerplatz), commonly called the Gärtnerplatztheater, is an opera house and opera company in Munich (the "Gärtnerplatz" is an urban square in the borough Ludwigsvorstadt-Isarvorstadt).

Designed by Franz Michael Reiffenstuel, it opened on 4 November 1865 as the city's second major theatre after the National Theatre.

At times exclusively concerned with operetta, in recent years there have also been productions of opera, musicals and ballet. The scope of activities is similar to that of the Komische Oper Berlin and the English National Opera in London.

One of the most active theatres in Germany, its season lasts from September to July and comprises more than 200 performances. The current intendant is Josef Ernst Köpplinger.

== History ==
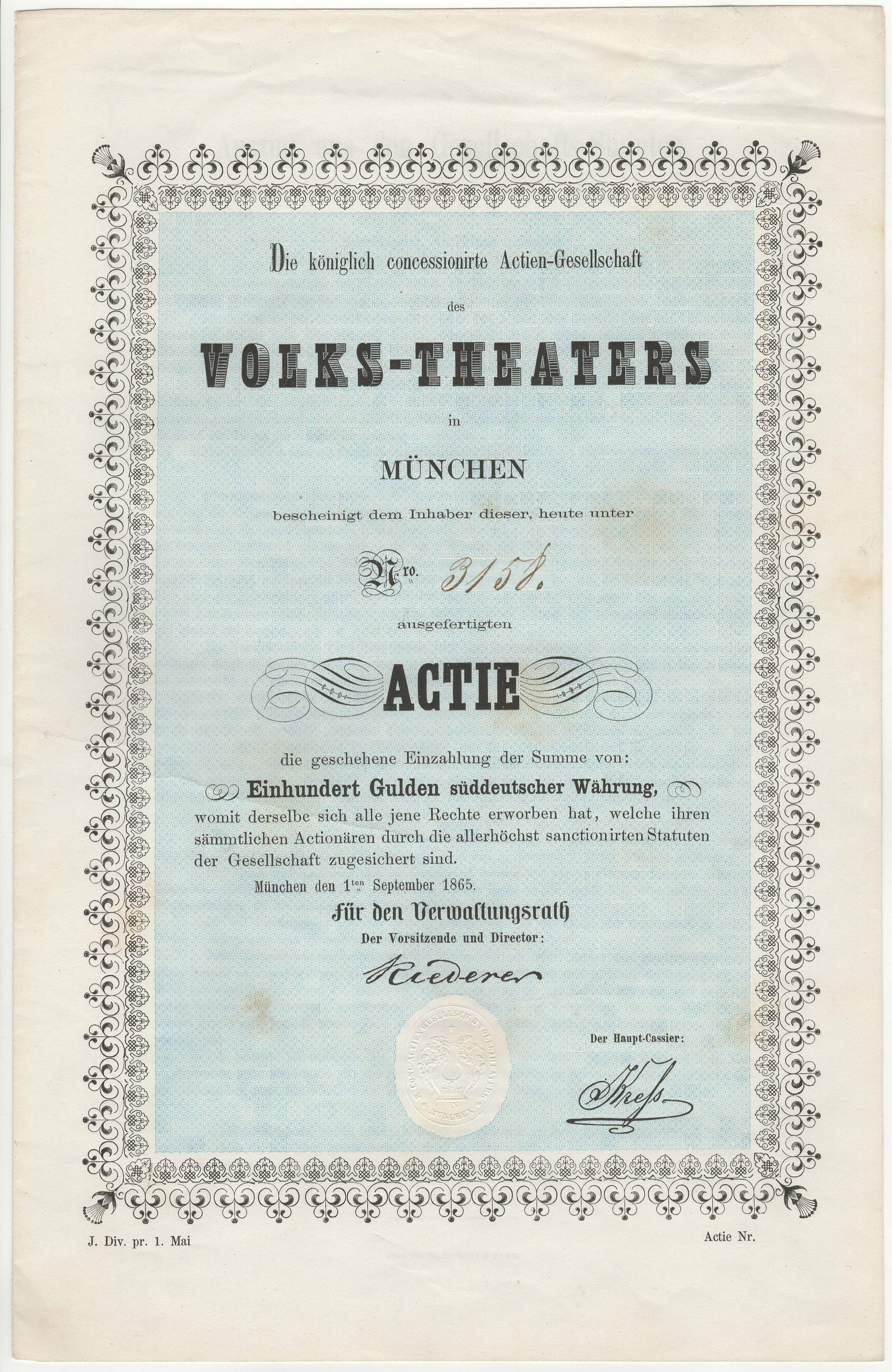
Founder's share of the Volkstheater, issued 1. September 1865

In 1863, a committee for the founding of a Volkstheater (people's theatre) formed. Ludwig II of Bavaria authorized a new building in the borough Isarvorstadt on 10 May 1864. It was designed by Franz Michael Reiffenstuel, who modelled it after the Nationaltheater in classicist style. The groundbreaking was on 25 August 1864, and the topping out was celebrated on 27 May 1865. The house was opened on 4 November 1865, with Duke Maximilian Joseph in Bavaria representing the king. The opening performance was a Prologue followed by an allegorical festive play (Festspiel) by Hermann Schmid, Was wir wollen (What we want), with music by Georg Kremplsetzer.

The house, intended to show a different repertory than the court theatre, met with financial problems, under frequently changing directors. It had to be sold in March 1870, went first to the former director Friedrich Engelken, shortly thereafter to the architect and a partner, who bought it for the king, who acquired it officially in May 1870. It was reopened on 1 October 1870, directed by Hermann von Schmid. In 1873, Ludwig II granted it the name "Königliches Theater am Gärtnerplatz" (Royal theatre at the Gärtnerplatz). From 1877, Karl von Perfall directed the house and also the Hoftheater. The 1878/79 season was especially splendid but resulted in a large deficit. Perfall therefore focused on the Hoftheater, and was succeeded by Georg Lang. The theatre dropped the royal emblem and was called "Theater am Gärtnerplatz".

In 1913, the house was rebuilt by Eugen Drollinger, who designed a new approach by the audience to the tiers, and installed more loges. During World War I, several charity performances were given for the Kriegsfonds and social organisations. In 1923, the house was acquired by the Wittelsbacher Ausgleichsfonds.

When the theatre was built, the focus was on operetta, then a new genre. Singspiele, light operas with spoken dialogue in German, were also performed. When the house opened as a royal theatre, Jacques Offenbach's Salon Pitzelberger was played, titled Eine musikalische Soirée in der Vorstadt (A musical soiree in the suburb). Some operettas received their world premiere, including Carl Zeller's Die Fornarina on 18 October 1879, starring Amalie Schönchen, Agnes Lang-Ratthey, Franz Josef Brakl and Max Hofpauer. At the end of 1892, a Völkerschau (People's Show), Die Amazonen von Dahomey, appeared with people from Africa for several weeks.

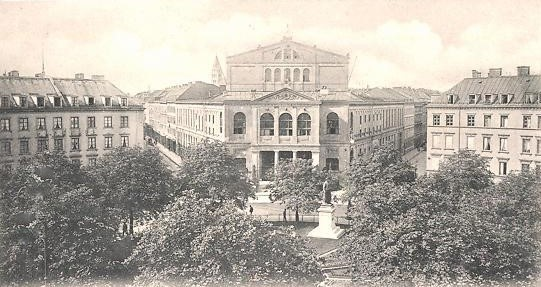
The theatre c. 1900

From 1899, the theatre played mainly operettas and was regarded as one of the leading houses for the genre in Germany. Fanny zu Reventlow was engaged for a short time. Magda Schneider appeared at the end of the 1920s, complaining that she had to perform up to 48 times a month for a laughable salary ("für eine lächerliche Gage bis zu achtundvierzig mal im Monat auf der Bühne"). Some Possen and Volksstücke were presented until the 1930s, when the Nazi regime banned performances by Jewish writers, librettists and composers, and demanded that the theatre serve as a venue exclusively for operettas, as the operetta was an excellent means of familiarizing the ordinary citizen with the theater arts ("ausschließlich zur Aufführungsstätte von Operetten, weil… die Operette ein sehr wesentliches Mittel ist, um den Volksgenossen an die Theaterkunst heranzuführen").

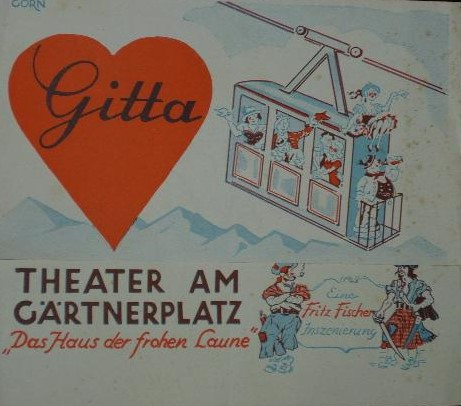
Program of Gitta, 1942, with Elisabeth Biebl in the title role

In April 1937, the state of Bavaria became owner of the theatre. Plans to replace it with a new building were not realised, but the house was restored. The reopening of the only state operetta house in Germany on 20 November 1937 presented Die Fledermaus by Johann Strauss, with Adolf Hitler in the audience. From 1938, Fritz Fischer was the intendant and Peter Kreuder was the music director. Fischer showed a new style, influenced by Berlin revues and filmed operettas, with mass scenes, opulent staging and fast action. Gitta. Eine Fahrt ins Blaue, a Lustspieloperette composed by Bernhard Stimmler and Carl Michalski, premiered on 18 May 1942, presenting the new style. Die lustige Witwe was also played, the declared favourite operetta of Hitler, who attended the theatre frequently.

On 21 April 1945, the theatre was badly damaged by the last bombing of Munich. Shortly after the war, performances were held at a Schornstraße location, and the restored theatre was reopened on 19 June 1948, playing Eine Nacht in Venedig by Johann Strauss. The Gärtnerplatztheater was able to secure Gustaf Gründgens to stage, as a guest, Offenbach's Die Banditen (The Bandits), first performed on 6 July 1949, with Gründgens playing a major role ("mit intellektuell-komödantischer Bravour"). The theatre played mainly popular works, including Millöcker's Der Bettelstudent, Abraham's Viktoria und ihr Husar, Kálmán's Die Csárdásfürstin with Sári Barabás in the title role, and Gräfin Mariza, Zeller's Der Vogelhändler, and Lehár's Das Land des Lächelns, with Elisabeth Biebl as Mi and Harry Friedauer as Gustl. The world premiere of Burkhard's Das Feuerwerk, staged by Erik Charell on 16 May 1950, was noticed well beyond Munich.

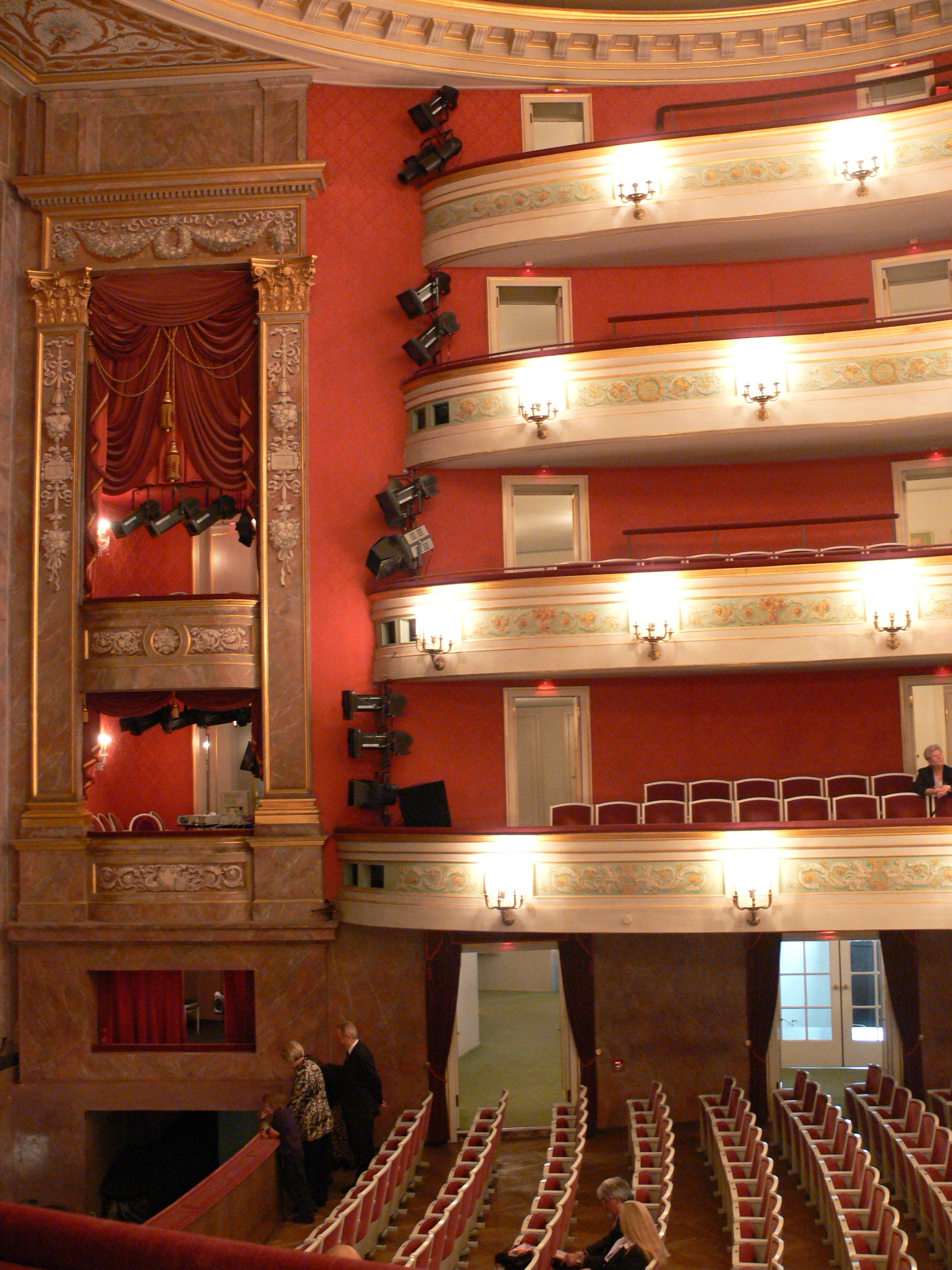
Interior in 2008

From 1952 to 1955, Rudolf Hartmann, who also directed the Bavarian State Opera, led the theatre. He initiated the performance of operas, but with the ensemble of the State Opera. From 1955, the theatre was again independent and officially named Staatstheater am Gärtnerplatz, led by Willy Duvoisin (1955 to 1958), Arno Assmann (1959 to 1964), Kurt Pscherer (1964 to 1983), Hellmuth Matiasek (1983 to 1996), Klaus Schultz (1996 to 2007), Ulrich Peters (2007 to 2012) and Josef Ernst Köpplinger (since 2012). The chief conductor is Anthony Bramall (since 2017), and the director of dance is Karl Alfred Schreiner (since 2012).

In 1955, the first musical was performed at the Gärtnerplatz, the German premiere of Harold Rome's Fanny, with Christine Görner and Trude Hesterberg in leading roles. It was followed a year later by Cole Porter's Kiss Me, Kate with Johannes Heesters. Loewe's My Fair Lady was performed in 1984, staged by August Everding and with Cornelia Froboess as Eliza Doolittle. In 1957, the theatre showed the first performance in Munich of Stravinsky's opera The Rake's Progress. World premieres of operas included Paul Engel's Daniel in 1994, Avet Terterian's Das Beben in 2003, and Wilfried Hiller Der Flaschengeist in 2014, among others.

The theatre was closed in 2012 for extensive restoration. It was reopened on 15 October 2017 with a gala performance followed by a new production of Die lustige Witwe on 19 October.

== Cited sources ==
- Braunmüller, Hubert (22 January 2014). "Premiere des Staatstheaters am Gärtnerplatz / Wilfried Hiller über die Oper "Der Flaschengeist" und sein Problem mit der Kirche". Abendzeitung (in German).
- Busse, Paul (1924). Geschichte des Gärtnerplatztheaters in München (in German). Verlag A. Waldbauer.
- Hußlein, Dorothea (3 November 2015). 150 Jahre Gärtnerplatztheater / Münchner Opernhaus fürs Volk (in German). Bayerischer Rundfunk.
- Jansen, Wolfgang (2012). Grosch, Nils; Juchem, Elmar (eds.). Die Rezeption des Broadwaymusicals in Deutschland (in German). Waxmann Verlag. pp. 21–22. ISBN 978-3-83-097614-1.
- Jungblut, Peter (15 October 2017). "Nach fünf Jahren Sanierung / Gärtnerplatztheater München glanzvoll wiedereröffnet" (in German). Bayerischer Rundfunk.
- Kuhn, Konrad (2003). "Über die Uraufführung der Oper Das Beben von Awet Terterjan am Staatstheater am Gärtnerplatz in München im März 2003". kleist.org (in German).
- Kutsch, Karl-J.; Riemens, Leo (2004). "Morbach, Günther". Großes Sängerlexikon (in German). Vol. 1 (4th ed.). Walter de Gruyter. p. 3211. ISBN 978-3-598-44088-5.
- Siedhoff, Thomas (1990). "Kultivierte Dramaturgie des unterhaltenden Musiktheaters". kultur-fibel.de (in German).
- Tholl, Egbert (15 October 2017). "Nach fünf Jahren Sanierung / Gärtnerplatztheater München glanzvoll wiedereröffnet". Süddeutsche Zeitung (in German).
- "Staatstheater am Gärtnerplatz". ganz-muenchen.de (in German).
- Staatstheater am Gärtnerplatz (in German). 1965.
- "Gärtnerplatztheater" (in German). Munich City.
- "My Fair Lady". vdoper.de (in German). 2018.
