= Mary Losseff =

Mary Losseff (also Mara Loseff) (13 March 1907, Vladivostok – 3 July 1972, London) was a Russian-born British singer and film actress.

== Life and career ==
Losseff was the stage, screen and life partner of the Austrian tenor Richard Tauber from 1929 to the mid-1930s, and Tauber's close friend until his death in 1948. She was the muse for his 1934 operetta Der singende Traum and his three songs titled An eine schöne Frau, and she also starred opposite him in numerous productions. She made commercial recordings of one solo (Peter, Peter) and several duets with Tauber. She co-starred in four films: The Land of Smiles (1930), Liebeskommando (1931), Bretter, die die Welt bedeuten (1935) and The Sky's the Limit (1938). Her voice was a high, light and sweet soprano – not big or great, but charming, true and technically assured.

Losseff's early life was comfortable. Her father owned a factory and the family were relatively well off. With the October Revolution, however, the family were forced to flee to Japan, where they remained for two years, surviving because of the father's They then moved on to Berlin in 1921. Little is known of this period except that Mary bore an illegitimate child, Dimitri, in 1927. This did not affect her plans to make a career on the stage. She took lessons from Bertha Niklas-Kempner and sent Dimitri to boarding school from the age of three for the whole of his childhood. She made her debut at Rudolf Nelson's Review in 1929, singing 'Peter, Peter'. This period is described by her then-lover, the pianist and composer Peter Kreuder, in his book Nur Puppen habe keine Tränen.

Tauber was in the audience at the Nelson Review and fell in love with Mary, and her voice, at first sight; he felt that she was the singer for whom he had long been searching to star in his planned operetta Der singende Traum. Initially through his influence, she secured major roles in several productions, including Paul Abraham's Viktoria und ihr Husar, Karl Millöcker's Die Dubarry, Jaromír Weinberger's Frühlingsstürme, Franz Lehár's Paganini, Abraham's Ball im Savoy, Emmerich Kálmán's Gräfin Maritza and of course Der singende Traum. She received critical acclaim, indicating that Tauber's faith was justified. At this time, Mary and Richard were considered a couple, and were expected to marry.

However, by 1933, Richard had been hounded from Germany, because his father was Jewish. Mary stayed by his side; they went first to Vienna and then to London. Mary took part in some London productions, but never quite hit it off with British audiences. She had also started drinking heavily, which affected her ability to perform. Domestically and professionally, Mary declined rapidly. Richard detested alcohol, and the nature of the relationship changed. When he married the non-singing British actress Diana Napier in 1936, Mary was devastated and began drinking even more heavily. Mary's last major role was in the South African production of Tauber's Land of Smiles in 1939, but during this tour she was replaced by her understudy Jose Malone. Richard was astonishingly loyal to her until his death. Many of his 60-odd letters repeat the same refrain: 'I wish that everything could have been different'. He also carried on giving Mary a weekly allowance and sending her additional money through the post whenever he could. Despite Richard's never-wavering constancy and repeated attempts to persuade her to stop drinking, Mary virtually disappeared from public performance, barring the occasional concert fixed up by friends. The last documented appearances by her were at the Bournemouth Winter Gardens in 1950.

Mary married the actor Brian Buchel in 1938 but the marriage did not succeed, and they separated long before divorce was granted in 1947. She moved to Exmouth in 1943, without Brian, then back to London to a flat in Queensway, Bayswater, in 1944 and remained there on and off until 1948, the year of Richard's death. She also bought a farm in Ireland, which was run by her son Dimitri and which she occasionally visited. She tried to bring her mother, brother and sister to Ireland and to England, but failed, and indeed she never saw her family again. After Richard died, her financial circumstances became desperate for a while, but she found a new partner by the name of Charles Holt, and when that relationship ended, lived with a Willy Bolt in Exmouth. Her National Registration Identity card gives her address as Bryn Cottage, Malltraeth, Anglesey in 1951, and in the same year she married Hugh J Owen in Anglesey. There is no record of a divorce, but by 1955, she was back in London, living in Acton and then Ealing. (There is no evidence that she lived at any time in Soho, sharing a room with a labourer who used the room by day which she used by night, as Diana Napier Tauber claimed.) In 1959, she met Vassia Myronovsky and moved into his house in the Hammersmith district of London, where she stayed until her death caused by lung cancer in July 1972.

Mary possessed a loving, homely quality until her old age, although her alcoholism gave rise to a terrible instability. She remained in touch with her son. He never forgave her for withholding information about his father, but later ancestry DNA tests of her grandchildren reveal that the unnamed father of Dimitri was 'central European Jewish', which casts her silence into a different light. She was extremely moved when her grandchildren were born. Her constant drinking and difficult behaviour became too much for Vassia in the end and their relationship deteriorated; during her terminal illness, she was tended by her daughter-in-law. She was cremated at North East Surrey Crematorium in Sutton, Surrey, where her ashes are interred.

== Discography ==
- ‘Peter, Peter’ (part of ‘Das spricht Bände’). Recorded 1929. Available on Bei uns um die Gedächtniskirche rum… Berlin Cabaret (Edel 0014532TLR, 1996). CD 2, track 6.
- ‘Frühling in der Manschurei’ and ‘Traum versunken’, from Frühlingsstürme. With Richard Tauber. German Odeon recording 0–4521, 28 January 1933.
- ‘Sagen dir nicht meine Augen’ and ‘Sing mir ein Liebeslied’, from ’’Der singende Traum’’. With Richard Tauber. Austrian Odeon recording 0-4541, 4 September 1934.

She also recorded on 4.9.34 two solos from 'Der singende Traum', issued on Odeon 0-25208.

- Unpublished 1936 master discs of ’’Der singende Traum’’, complete (now available from Danny Sharples, 20 Virginia Close, Baguley, Manchester M23 9NG, UK).

== Filmography ==
- The Land of Smiles (dir. Max Reichmann; Richard Tauber Tonfilm-Production. Germany, 1930).
- Liebeskommando (dir. Géza von Bolváry; Super-Film. Germany, 1931).
- Bretter, die die Welt bedeuten (dir. Kurt Gerron; Panta-Film. Austria, 1935).
- The Sky’s the Limit (dir. Lee Garmes and Jack Buchanan; General Film Distributors. UK, 1938).

== Bibliography ==
=== Primary sources ===
- Mary Losseff's private papers including 60 letters from Richard Tauber, held in the Exilarte Center for Banned Music, Universität für Musik und darstellende Kunst, Wien

=== Secondary sources ===
- Losseff, Nicky, 'Mary Losseff and Richard Tauber', in The Record Collector 51 (2006).
- Castle, Charles and Tauber, Diana Napier; This was Richard Tauber. London and New York: W.H. Allen, 1971.
- Jürgs, Michael; Gern hab’ ich die Frau’n geküßt: Die Richard-Tauber Biographie. München: List-Verlag, 2000.
- Kreuder, Peter; Nur Puppen habe keine Tränen. Munich: Percha, 1971; reissued Munich: Deutsche Taschenbuch Verlag, 2003.
- Tauber, Diana Napier; My Heart and I. London: Evans Brothers, 1959
