= The Land of Smiles (1952 film) =

1952 film directed by Hans Deppe and Erik Ode

- Directed by: Hans Deppe; Erik Ode
- Written by: Ludwig Herzer (libretto); Fritz Löhner-Beda (libretto); Viktor Léon; Axel Eggebrecht; Hubert Marischka
- Produced by: Kurt Ulrich
- Starring: Mártha Eggerth; Jan Kiepura; Walter Müller; Paul Hörbiger
- Cinematography: Kurt Schulz
- Edited by: Margarete Steinborn
- Music by: Franz Lehár (operetta); Paul Dessau
- Production company: Berolina Film
- Distributed by: Herzog Film
- Release date: 2 October 1952
- Running time: 107 minutes
- Country: West Germany
- Language: German

The Land of Smiles (German: Das Land des Lächelns) is a 1952 West German operetta film directed by Hans Deppe and Erik Ode and starring Mártha Eggerth, Jan Kiepura and Walter Müller. It is an adaptation of the operetta The Land of Smiles composed by Franz Lehár which had previously been made into a 1930 film starring Richard Tauber. It was shot at the Tempelhof Studios in Berlin and on location in Thailand. The film's sets were designed by the art directors Willi Herrmann, Peter Schlewski and Heinrich Weidemann.

== Cast ==
- Mártha Eggerth as Lissy Licht, Sängerin
- Jan Kiepura as Sou Bawana Pantschur, Prinz von Javora
- Walter Müller as Gustl Potter, ein junger Wiener
- Paul Hörbiger as Professor Ferdinand Licht
- Karin Von Dassel as Mi, Schwester von Prinz Sou
- Karl Meixner as Exzellenz Tschang
- Ludwig Schmitz as Kato
- Brigitte Lwowsky as Chrysanthème
- Alastair Duncan as Sou-Chong

== Bibliography ==
- Traubner, Richard. Operetta: A Theatrical History. Routledge, 2003.
