= The Land of Smiles (1930 film) =

1930 film

- Directed by: Max Reichmann
- Written by: Ludwig Herzer (libretto); Fritz Löhner-Beda (libretto); Viktor Léon; Anton Kuh; Hans Jacoby; Curt J. Braun; Léo Lasko
- Starring: Richard Tauber; Mary Losseff; Hans Mierendorff; Bruno Kastner
- Cinematography: Reimar Kuntze
- Edited by: Geza Pollatschik
- Music by: Franz Lehár (operetta); Paul Dessau
- Production company: Richard Tauber Tonfilm
- Distributed by: Bavaria Film
- Release date: 17 November 1930
- Running time: 102 minutes
- Country: Weimar Republic
- Language: German

The Land of Smiles (German: Das Land des Lächelns) is a 1930 German operetta film directed by Max Reichmann and starring Richard Tauber, Mary Losseff and Hans Mierendorff. It is an adaptation of the operetta The Land of Smiles composed by Franz Lehár. Lehár himself appeared in the film in a small role. It was shot at the Emelka Studios in Munich with sets designed by the art director Hans Jacoby.

The operetta was again adapted for a 1952 film The Land of Smiles starring Jan Kiepura.

== Plot ==
It is no coincidence that the master of the house chose the Lehár operetta "The Land of Smiles" for a performance in honor of his daughter's forthcoming marriage to an "exotic prince", a Japanese diplomat. It's meant to be a metaphor of what might await them. The well-known plot of the Lehár operetta about a tragic marriage between a Chinese prince named Sou Chong and a young Austrian shows parallels to the upcoming, real connection of the lord's daughter, who breaks up with her local admirer Gustl and her future husband from the Far East has turned towards. Both storylines are soon interwoven, and the operetta reflects reality.

Prince Sou Chong brought a wife with him from his trip to Europe. He hides the young woman in a pavilion in the park, fearing that his traditional family will be hostile to his wife. He only lets his sister Mi in on his secret, who soon becomes friends with the stranger. When Sou-Chong's uncle Chang suggests that his nephew choose four wives from the country's most distinguished families, the young prince initially refuses, but then has to admit that he is already married. However, his uncle continues to press him and so Sou-Chong ultimately follows the old laws of his country. When his wife Liesl found out about this, she was very unhappy. Then, however, her cousin and admirer from her homeland surprisingly turns up and gives her comfort. They then agree to escape together. However, the plan fails. However, Sou-Chong has now realized that his wife will never be happy under the given circumstances and releases her. He hides his sadness.

Liesa recognizes herself as a Central European in the sad woman from the operetta, and she begins to question her upcoming connection: the customs and the habits to which the Austrian in the song in the East Asian foreign country has to submit make the heroine unhappy. The couple fails because of the incompatibility of cultural differences. And so, in the operetta, Gustl and the prince's wife flee Chinese pomp to return home to Europe. Liesa also thinks better and decides to accept the proposal of loyal Gustl instead of becoming unhappy abroad despite all the wealth.

== Cast ==
- Richard Tauber as Ein exotischer Fürst / Prinz Sou Chong in der Operette
- Mary Losseff as Liesa
- Hans Mierendorff as Der Gesandte - ihr Vater
- Bruno Kastner as Gustl
- Karl Platen as Eine alte Exzellenz / ein alter Chinese in der Operette
- Margit Suchy as Liesa in der Operette
- Hella Kürty as Mi in der Operette
- Willy Stettner as Gustl in der Operette
- Max Schreck as Der Hundertjährige in der Operette
- Georg John as Tschang in der Operette
- Franz Lehár as Der Kapellmeister

== Bibliography ==
- Traubner, Richard (2003). Operetta: A Theatrical History. Routledge. ISBN 978-0-415-96641-2.
