= Ball at the Savoy (1955 film) =

1955 film

- Directed by: Paul Martin
- Written by: Alfred Grünwald (libretto); Fritz Löhner-Beda (libretto); Paul Martin; Franz Tassié
- Produced by: Waldemar Frank
- Starring: Rudolf Prack; Nadja Tiller; Peter W. Staub
- Cinematography: Karl Löb
- Edited by: Martha Dübber
- Music by: Paul Abraham
- Production company: Central-Europa-Film
- Distributed by: Europa-Filmverleih
- Release date: 27 April 1955
- Running time: 96 minutes
- Country: West Germany
- Language: German

Ball at the Savoy (German: Ball im Savoy) is a 1955 West German musical comedy film directed by Paul Martin and starring Rudolf Prack, Nadja Tiller, and Peter W. Staub. Inspired by the 1932 operetta Ball im Savoy by Paul Abraham, this film is closer to a revue show than the previous 1935 film adaptation.

The film's sets were designed by the art director Albrecht Becker and Herbert Kirchhoff. It was shot at the Wandsbek Studios in Hamburg.

== Cast ==
- Rudolf Prack as Paul Alexander
- Nadja Tiller as Tangolita
- Peter W. Staub as Viktor
- Eva Ingeborg Scholz as Madeleine
- Rudolf Platte as Mustapha Bei
- Caterina Valente as Caterina
- John W. Bubbles as himself
- Die drei Peheiros as Themselves
- Rasma Ducat as Rasma
- Kurt Edelhagen as himself, Musician
- Peter Garden as René
- Bibi Johns as Bibi Johns
- Kurt Pratsch-Kaufmann as Johann
- Brigitte Rau as Susanne
- Edhilt Rochell as Ruth
- Ilo Schieder as Illo
- Hubert von Meyerinck as Max

== Bibliography ==
- Bock, Hans-Michael; Bergfelder, Tim, eds. (2009). The Concise Cinegraph: Encyclopaedia of German Cinema. New York: Berghahn Books. ISBN 978-1-57181-655-9.
