= Imre Földes (writer) =

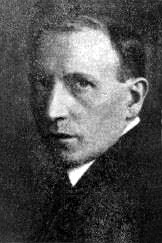

Imre Földes, born Imre Fleischmann, also known as Emmerich Feld (15 September 1881, Kaposvár - 30 April 1958, Budapest) was a Hungarian playwright and librettist.

== Biography ==
Földes originally worked as a government official in Budapest. In his spare time, he wrote historical plays in verse. His first work to receive a performance, in 1904, was A Király Arája (The King's Bride), which was presented at the National Theatre. A long series of Romantic dramas followed; three of which won awards from the Hungarian Academy of Sciences.

Much of his audience appeal was derived from his handling of social topics. In A Császár Katonái (The Emperor's Soldiers, 1908), he depicted the anti-Hungarian attitudes that were widespread in the Austro-Hungarian Army. In Hivatalnok Urak (The Clerks, 1909), he portrays the lives of government officials who behave like the public's masters, while unable to solve their own daily problems.

Critics described his plays as "more or less Socialist oriented" and filled with "shocking" scenes. He was especially good at portraying the Jewish community of Budapest. In his later works, the criticisms are somewhat muted.

He also wrote some light comedies, in the style of Edmond Rostand, and co-authored librettos for operettas; notably Viktória and Hawaii rózsája. He published a number of short stories in newspapers and magazines as well.

== Filmography ==
- Seefestspiele Mörbisch: Viktoria und ihr Husar (TV Movie) (play) 2016
- Blomman från Hawaii (TV Movie) (as Emric Foeldes) 1992
- Csalással nem! (TV Movie) 1989
- Hivatalnok urak (novel) 1984
- Victoria und ihr Husar (TV Movie) (operetta) 1975
- Die Blume von Hawaii (TV Movie) (libretto - as Emmerich Földes) 1971
- Viktoria und ihr Husar (TV Movie) (operetta - as Emric Foeldes) 1965
- Viktoria ja hänen husaarinsa (TV Movie) (as Emric Foeldes) 1963
- Victoria and Her Hussar 1954
- Sirius (play) 1942
- Anniversary (idea) 1936
- The Case of Doctor Brenner (play "A Kuruzslo" - as Emric Foeldes) 1933
- The Flower of Hawaii 1933
- Alias the Doctor (play "A Kuruzslo" - as Emric Foeldes) 1932
- Victoria and Her Hussar (operetta - as Emric Foeldes) 1931
- A Man's Past (play "Diploma" - as Emric Foeldes) 1927
- Nameless (play - as Emmerich Földes) 1923
- Mindent egy asszonyért! 1922
- Hivatalnok urak 1919
- Soldiers of the Emperor (play) 1918
- The Charlatan (Also known as. A Kuruzsló) 1917
- A paradicsom (screenplay) 1915
- Captive Souls (Also known as Rablélek) (screenplay) 1914
