= The Workman's Overall =

- Munkászubbony
- Directed by: István Bródy
- Based on: Novella by Imre Földes
- Production company: Teaching Film Studio
- Release date: 12 January 1915
- Country: Hungary
- Language: Silent

The Workman's Overall, also known as The Work Jacket, (Hungarian: A munkászubbony) is a silent Hungarian film produced in 1914, based on a novella by Imre Földes. The film was made in the Teaching Film Studio. It was directed by István Bródy, shot by Béla Zsitkovszky. It was first shown on 12 January 1915. After being lost for decades, the film was rediscovered in 2017. It was restored and digitalized by the Hungarian National Film Archives. It is one of a small number of early Hungarian films that survived. It is also one of the oldest Hungarian films in existence and one of the longest Hungarian silent films.

The pre-WWII film includes vantages along the Danube River and of bridges across it. The film was shown in 2023 at the Stein Auditorium in New Delhi, India with live piano accompaniment.

== Cast ==
- Gyula Hegedűs
- Ilona Berzétey

== See also ==
- List of rediscovered films
