= Fritz Löhner-Beda =

Austrian writer and librettist (1883–1942)

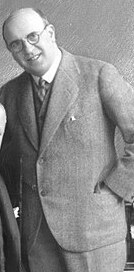
- Fritz Löhner-Beda in the 1920s
- Born: Bedřich Löwy; 24 June 1883; Wildenschwert, Bohemia, Austria-Hungary
- Died: 4 December 1942 (aged 59); Monowitz concentration camp, Occupied-Poland
- Occupations: Librettist, lyricist, writer
- Writing career
- Language: German

Signature
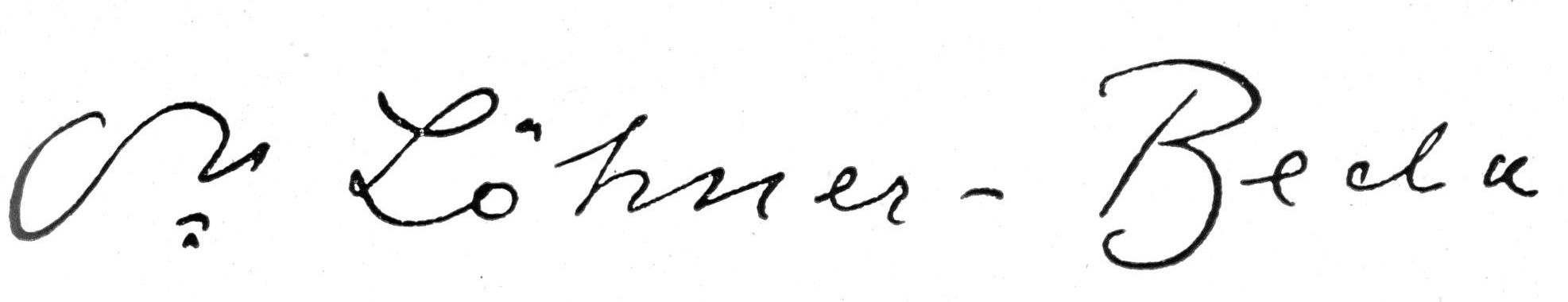

Fritz Löhner-Beda (24 June 1883 – 4 December 1942), born Bedřich Löwy, was an Austrian librettist, lyricist and writer. Once nearly forgotten, many of his songs and tunes remain popular today. He was murdered in Auschwitz III Monowitz concentration camp.

== Life ==
Löhner-Beda was born Bedřich Löwy in Wildenschwert, Bohemia (present-day Ústí nad Orlicí, Czech Republic) in 1883. In 1888, his family moved to Vienna, and in 1896 changed their surname to the less Jewish surname Löhner. Having passed his Matura exams, he began the study of law at the University of Vienna, where he became a member of the Jewish Kadimah student association. After he had obtained his doctorate, he worked as a lawyer from 1908 onwards. A dedicated football player, he was among the founders of the Hakoah Vienna sports club in 1909.

In 1910, Löhner-Beda decided upon a career as an author. He wrote numerous light satires, sketches, poems, and lyrics but also contributed to several newspapers, often under the pen name "Beda", a shortened version of his Czech first name, Bedřich (Frederick). In 1913, he met Franz Lehár, for whom he wrote the libretto of the 1916 operetta Der Sterngucker (The Stargazer). Two years later, in 1918, Löhner-Beda was called up for military service in World War I, which he left as an officer and a convinced antimilitarist.

In the 1920s, Löhner-Beda became one of the most sought-after librettists and lyricists in Vienna. Together with Lehár as composer, Ludwig Herzer as co-author, and Richard Tauber as singer, Löhner-Beda produced the operettas Friederike (Frederica, 1928), Das Land des Lächelns (The Land of Smiles, 1929), and, with Paul Knepler as co-author, Giuditta (1934). Together with his friend Alfred Grünwald as co-author and Paul Abraham as composer, Löhner-Beda produced Viktoria und ihr Husar (Victoria and Her Hussar, 1930), Die Blume von Hawaii (The Flower of Hawaii, 1931), and Ball im Savoy (Ball at the Savoy, 1932).

On 1 April 1938, almost immediately after the Anschluss (the annexation of Austria by Nazi Germany, in mid-March 1938), Fritz Löhner-Beda was arrested and deported to the Dachau concentration camp. On 23 September 1938 he was transferred to the Buchenwald concentration camp. There, together with his fellow prisoner Hermann Leopoldi at the end of 1938, he composed the famous anthem of the concentration camp, Das Buchenwaldlied ("The Buchenwald Song"):

O Buchenwald, ich kann dich nicht vergessen,
weil du mein Schicksal bist.
Wer dich verließ, der kann es erst ermessen,
wie wundervoll die Freiheit ist!
O Buchenwald, wir jammern nicht und klagen,
und was auch unser Schicksal sei,
wir wollen trotzdem Ja zum Leben sagen,
denn einmal kommt der Tag, dann sind wir frei!

O Buchenwald, I cannot forget you,
because you are my fate.
Only he who leaves you can appreciate
how wonderful freedom is!
O Buchenwald, we don’t cry and complain;
and whatever our destiny may be,
we nevertheless shall say "yes" to life:
for once the day comes, we shall be free!

The line wir wollen trotzdem Ja zum Leben sagen was adopted by the Holocaust survivor Viktor Frankl for the German title of his 1946 book Man's Search for Meaning.

Even though Löhner-Beda's name appeared in the Nazi Encyclopedia of Jews in Music in 1940, his songs and the Lehár operettas were still performed (but with no mention of their librettist). The circumstances surrounding Franz Lehár possibly attempting to intercede with the Nazis on Löhner-Beda's behalf are clouded. Supposedly, after World War II, Lehár denied any cognizance of Löhner-Beda's concentration-camp imprisonment, but one source states that Lehár may have tried personally to secure Hitler's guarantee of Löhner-Beda's safety.

On 17 October 1942 Löhner-Beda was deported to the Monowitz concentration camp, near Auschwitz. The circumstances of his murder are described in Raul Hilberg's The Destruction of the European Jews: during an inspection by several directors of the IG Farben syndicate around Otto Ambros, Fritz ter Meer, Carl Krauch, and Heinrich Bütefisch, the already diseased Löhner-Beda was denounced as not working hard enough, for which he was beaten to death on 4 December 1942. A Kapo accused of the murder in the 1968 Frankfurt Auschwitz Trial was acquitted of the charge due to lack of evidence.

== Notable songs ==
Among the most famous songs for which he wrote the lyrics are:

- "In der Bar zum Krokodil" ("In the Crocodile bar"), music by Willy Engel-Berger
- "Du schwarzer Zigeuner" ("You black gypsy"), tango, an adaptation of "Cikánka" by Karel Vacek
- "Drunt' in der Lobau" ("Down there in the Lobau"), music by Heinrich Strecker
- "Ausgerechnet Bananen" ("Of all things bananas"), an adaptation of "Yes! We Have No Bananas"
- "Ich hab' mein Herz in Heidelberg verloren" ("I lost my heart in Heidelberg"), music by Fred Raymond
- "Oh, Donna Clara", Tango by Jerzy Petersburski
- "Wo sind deine Haare, August?" ("Where is your hair, August?"), foxtrot by Richard Fall
- "Was machst du mit dem Knie, lieber Hans?" ("What are you doing with the knee, dear Hans?"), pasodoble by Richard Fall
- "Dein ist mein ganzes Herz" ("Yours is my heart alone") from The Land of Smiles
- "Freunde, das Leben ist lebenswert" ("Friends, life is worth living") from Giuditta
- "Meine Lippen, sie küssen so heiß" ("My lips, they kiss so hotly") from Giuditta

== Filmography ==
- The Land of Smiles, directed by Max Reichmann (Germany, 1930, based on the operetta of the same name)
- Victoria and Her Hussar, directed by Richard Oswald (Germany, 1931, based on the operetta of the same name)
- Frederica, directed by Fritz Friedmann-Frederich (Germany, 1932, based on the operetta of the same name)
- The Flower of Hawaii, directed by Richard Oswald (Germany, 1933, based on the operetta of the same name)
- Ball im Savoy, directed by Steve Sekely (Austria, 1935, based on the operetta of the same name)
- The Student's Romance, directed by Otto Kanturek (UK, 1935, based on the musical I Lost My Heart in Heidelberg)
- Dschainah, das Mädchen aus dem Tanzhaus, directed by Vilmos Gyimes (Austria, 1935, based on the operetta of the same name)
- Ball at Savoy, directed by Victor Hanbury (UK, 1936, based on the operetta of the same name)
- I Lost My Heart in Heidelberg, directed by Ernst Neubach (West Germany, 1952, with the lyrics of the musical of the same name)
- The Land of Smiles, directed by Hans Deppe and Erik Ode (West Germany, 1952, based on the operetta of the same name)
- The Flower of Hawaii, directed by Géza von Cziffra (West Germany, 1953, with the lyrics of the operetta of the same name)
- Victoria and Her Hussar, directed by Rudolf Schündler (West Germany, 1954, based on the operetta of the same name)
- Ball im Savoy, directed by Paul Martin (West Germany, 1955, based on the operetta of the same name)
- Schön ist die Welt, directed by Géza von Bolváry (West Germany, 1957, based on the operetta of the same name)

=== Screenwriter ===
- Let the Little Ones Come to Me, directed by Max Neufeld (Austria, 1920)
- Freut euch des Lebens, directed by Luise Fleck and Jacob Fleck (Austria, 1920)
- Anita, directed by Luise Fleck and Jacob Fleck (Austria, 1920)
- Großstadtgift, directed by Luise Fleck and Jacob Fleck (Austria, 1920)
- Der Leiermann, directed by Luise Fleck and Jacob Fleck (Austria, 1920)
- Eva, The Sin, directed by Luise Fleck and Jacob Fleck (Austria, 1920)
- Eine Million Dollar, directed by Luise Fleck and Jacob Fleck (Austria, 1921)
- Light of His Life, directed by Max Neufeld (Austria, 1921)
- Olga Frohgemut, directed by Luise Fleck and Jacob Fleck (Austria, 1922)
- Six Girls and a Room for the Night, directed by Hans Behrendt (Germany, 1928)
- Fra Diavolo, directed by Mario Bonnard (1931, German adaptation of a French-Italian screenplay)
- Er und sein Diener, directed by Steve Sekely (1931, German adaptation of a Hungarian screenplay)
