= The Sky's the Limit (1938 film) =

- Directed by: Jack Buchanan; Lee Garmes
- Written by: Jack Buchanan; Douglas Furber
- Produced by: Jack Buchanan
- Starring: Jack Buchanan; Mara Losseff; William Kendall
- Cinematography: Lee Garmes; Henry Harris
- Edited by: Michael Gordon
- Music by: Van Phillips
- Production company: Jack Buchanan Productions
- Distributed by: General Film Distributors
- Release date: 1938
- Running time: 78 minutes
- Country: United Kingdom
- Language: English

The Sky's the Limit is a 1938 British musical comedy film directed by Jack Buchanan and Lee Garmes and starring Buchanan, Mara Losseff and William Kendall.

It was made at Pinewood Studios.

== Plot summary ==
Jack is an aircraft designer who becomes involved with a Russian soprano, Mary Loseff. She had in real life been the partner of Richard Tauber, who broke off the relationship to marry Diana Napier, turning Loseff into an alcoholic. While William Kendall will be seen as Lord Beckley's underhand who tries to steal the star’s invention. H. F. Maltby is in his element as the irascible Lord Beckley and , strong comedy roles are taken by Athene Seyler, Sara Allgood, Antony , Holies and David Burns.

== Cast ==
- Jack Buchanan as Dave Harber
- Mara Losseff as Isobella
- William Kendall as Thornwell Beamish
- David Hutcheson as Teddy Carson
- Sara Allgood as Mrs. O'Reilly
- David Burns as 'Ballyhoo' Bangs
- C. M. Hallard as Lord Morgan
- Morris Harvey as Batavian Ambassador
- Anthony Holles as Marillo
- Barry Lupino as Drunk
- Andreas Malandrinos as Headwaiter
- H. F. Maltby as Lord Beckley
- Wally Patch as Commissionaire
- Athene Seyler as Miss Prinney
- Charles Stone as Orchestra Leader

Joe Hurst as RAF Officer

== Bibliography ==
- Low, Rachael. Filmmaking in 1930s Britain. George Allen & Unwin, 1985.
- Wood, Linda. British Films, 1927-1939. British Film Institute, 1986.
