= Josefa Moe =

Hawaiian entertainer (1933–2006)

- Born: May 1, 1933
- Origin: Hawaii
- Died: November 3, 2006 (aged 73)

John "Josefa" Moe (May 1, 1933 – November 3, 2006) was an entertainer and artist.

== Biography ==
=== Early life ===
Moe was born "on the road" in Jubbulpore, India to Samoan father Pulu and Filipino/Hawaiian mother Louisa, then musical stars touring with Felix Mendelssohn's Hawaiian Serenaders. The Moes were a major force in introducing Hawaiian entertainment to Europe and Asia in the early 1900s. Josefa was also nephew to Pulu's brothers Tauivi, Fuifui, as well as Tau of the renowned Tau Moe family.

=== Education ===
Josefa was raised in an English boarding school while his mother and father performed the world over. In his teen years, Josefa traveled with his parents who starred in Felix Mendelssohn's Hawaiian Serenaders, experiencing great adventures and soaking up all the magic of European vaudeville from backstage as well as meeting greats like Laurel and Hardy and Terry-Thomas who was a close friend of Pulu Mo'e. Later, in college, Josefa was educated in the fine art of calligraphy. For a time, Josefa was also a middleweight Golden Gloves boxing champion. Once out of school, Josefa was roommate with Bond actor Roger Moore. Daily, the two would press their good suits and make the rounds for auditions. After a comedic vaudeville stint in England teamed with brilliant comedian/impressionist Maurice Sellar and pop-eyed actor Marty Feldman, young Josefa relocated to Honolulu, Hawaii (1955) with his father Pulu. There Josefa served as a local "beach boy", entertaining elite tourists of the day with song, dance, tours and surfing instruction. This was the very beginnings of the popular tourist industry that would evolve, along with Josefa, to occupy the clubs and stages of Waikiki.

=== Career ===
During this time, Josefa hand-carved authentic Polynesian tiki and honed his skills as a Samoan knife dancer perfecting the art of the Nifo Oti (Samoan sword) and spectacular Fire Knife dance. It was in this era (1957) that Josefa served in the United States Army at Schofield Barracks, Hawaii. During the 1950s through early 1970s, Josefa performed as a knife dancer and musician in Waikiki at Duke Kahanamoku's and was featured knife dancer at the International Market Place's Polynesian Revue as well as the Royal Hawaiian and Sheraton Hotel's luaus. He performed with Hawaii's biggest entertainers of the era like Don Ho, Kui Lee, Martin Denny and Ed Kenney. Josefa was featured in the first authentic Polynesian show with Kimo Lee in New York's Lexington Hotel. Aside from being a knife dancer, Josefa was a musician singing and playing a variety of instruments, specializing in guitar and Tahitian bass drum and to'ere (slotted wooden drum). Josefa was recorded performing with the International Market Place troupe on the popular 1962 album POLYNESIAN POT-POURRI on which you can hear him perform the Samoan "slap dance" on track 11 - S'au S'au Wale.

For a period, Josefa was considered the most photographed Samoan in the world appearing in Esquire magazine, National Geographic and many other periodicals. Josefa toured internationally, bringing his unique style of culture and music to audiences everywhere. As a sometime actor, he was often approached to play local Hawaiian thugs in shows like Hawaii Five-O but was relegated to non-speaking roles once his elegant British accent was revealed. Josefa was cast in the film James Michener's Hawaii, but lost the part when director Fred Zinneman left production causing the film to be delayed and ultimately recast.

Josefa Moe is credited as a "dancer" in the 1959 American film Forbidden Island starring Jon Hall. In addition to entertaining, Josefa owned and operated Academy Art Associates; a commercial art studio and sign shop in Honolulu, Hawaii. Josefa also invented KEPA HAWAIIAN HERITAGE BRACELETTES; Koa wood bracelettes hand-lettered with traditional Hawaiian names. Some also believe that Josefa designed Punchy, the Hawaiian Punch mascot.

Josefa Moe is known as an originator of free-hand T-shirt airbrushing. Josefa loved nothing more than to set up easel and airbrush on a busy sidewalk in Waikiki to "talk story" while custom painting cartoons and caricatures on T-shirts "while-u-watched." His custom T-shirts were featured in Time magazine. He was an accomplished muralist and installed his works in Hawaii and all over the country. In the 1980s Josefa teamed up to design restaurants and clubs in the east coast where his brother Lani Moe entertained. Josefa was a fixture at the Kamehameha and Aloha swap meets for decades where he would paint T-shirts and bracelets while enjoying one of his lifelong joys; people-watching. After his retirement to Las Vegas, Josefa's younger sons and daughter continued the successful Hawaiian airbrush tattoo business that Josefa had created in Hawaii.

=== Death ===
Josefa Moe died of natural causes November 3, 2006 in Las Vegas, Nevada. His memorial was held on April 29, 2007 in Waikiki, Hawaii at Queen's Surf beach. His ashes were scattered in the ocean where he taught his children as well as many friends and tourists to swim, surf and appreciate the beauty of Hawaii. Coincidentally, the ashes of friend and fellow entertainer Don Ho were scattered at Queen's Surf beach a week after Josefa's memorial (May 5, 2007).

Josefa Moe is survived by his 11 children: Brian, Joseph, Daniel, Robin, Jaymie, Christopher, Kalani, Taui, Tammy, Kaipo and Cheyne Mo'e.
