= A Day of Roses in August =

1927 film

- Directed by: Max Mack
- Written by: Herbert Nossen; Willy Rath; Alfred Schirokauer
- Starring: Eduard von Winterstein; Margarete Schön; Ernst Rückert
- Cinematography: Willy Goldberger
- Music by: Felix Bartsch
- Production company: Film-Produktions-Gemeinschaft
- Distributed by: Filmhaus Bruckmann
- Release date: 12 August 1927
- Country: Germany
- Languages: Silent; German intertitles

A Day of Roses in August (German: Ein Tag der Rosen im August) is a 1927 German silent film directed by Max Mack and starring Eduard von Winterstein, Margarete Schön, and Ernst Rückert. It was shot at the Johannisthal Studios in Berlin. The film's sets were designed by the art director Kurt Richter. The film takes place in August 1914 at the beginning of the First World War.

== Cast ==
- Eduard von Winterstein as Major von Rudow
- Margarete Schön as Helene von Rudow
- Ernst Rückert as Konrad, deren Sohn
- Gerd Briese as Fritz, deren Sohn
- Helga Thomas as Maria Höhne
- Alfred Abel as Geheimrat Lüttjens
- Maria Minzenti as Hilde, seine Tochter
- John Mylong as Werner Anrae, ein Maler
- Otz Tollen Oberleutnant Axel von Sparr
- Hella Kürty as Sascha
- Anna von Palen as Wirtin
- Georg Burghardt as Der alte Fritz
- Kurt Gerron as Boxer
- Bruno Ziener as Bankpräsident
- Ellen Kürti as Sascha
- Grete Reinwald

== Bibliography ==
- Kapczynski, Jennifer M.; Richardson, Michael D., eds. (2014) [2012]. A New History of German Cinema. New York: Boydell & Brewer. ISBN 978-1-58046-854-1.
