= Victoria and Her Hussar (1931 film) =

1931 film directed by Richard Oswald

- Directed by: Richard Oswald
- Written by: Fritz Friedmann-Frederich; Imre Földes (operetta); Alfred Grünwald (libretto); Fritz Löhner-Beda (libretto)
- Produced by: Richard Oswald
- Starring: Michael Bohnen; Friedel Schuster; Iván Petrovich
- Cinematography: Reimar Kuntze
- Edited by: Else Baum
- Music by: Paul Abraham
- Production company: Aafa-Film
- Distributed by: Aafa-Film
- Release date: 12 October 1931
- Running time: 96 minutes
- Country: Germany
- Language: German

Victoria and Her Hussar (German: Viktoria und ihr Husar) is a 1931 German musical film directed by Richard Oswald and starring Michael Bohnen, Friedel Schuster and Iván Petrovich. It is an Operetta film based on the operetta Viktoria und ihr Husar by Paul Abraham which was itself inspired by a work by Imre Földes. Two later film versions of the operetta were made in 1954 and 1982.

It was shot at the Tempelhof Studios in Berlin. The film's sets were designed by the art director Franz Schroedter.

== Synopsis ==
A Hungarian countess believes that her husband, a hussar officer in the Austro-Hungarian army, has been killed in the First World War. She becomes engaged to an American diplomat, only for her first husband to turn up still alive.

== Cast ==
- Michael Bohnen as John Cunlight, amerikanischer Gesandter
- Friedel Schuster as Viktoria, Johns Frau
- Iván Petrovich as Stefan Koltay, Husaren-Rittmeister
- Willy Stettner as Graf Ferry, Viktorias Bruder
- Else Elster as O Lia San, Ferrys Braut
- Gretl Theimer as Riquette, Kammerzofe Viktorias
- Ernő Verebes as Jancyi, Koltays Bursche
- Julius Falkenstein as L. kosak
- Gyula Szőreghy as 2. Kosak
- Charles Willy Kayser as Taylor
- Eugen Neufeld as General
- Adolf E. Licho as Birinski
- Ernst Pittschau as Sekretär
- Carl Jöken as Sänger
- Friedl Weiss as Tänzerin

== Bibliography ==
- Höbusch, Harald. "Mountain of Destiny": Nanga Parbat and Its Path Into the German Imagination. Boydell & Brewer, 2016.
- Traubner, Richard. Operetta: A Theatrical History. Routledge, 2003.
