= The Flower of Hawaii (1933 film) =

1933 film directed by Richard Oswald

- German film poster
- German: Die Blume von Hawaii
- Directed by: Richard Oswald
- Screenplay by: Heinz Goldberg; Alfred Grünwald (libretto); Fritz Löhner-Beda (libretto); Emric Foeldes (libretto)
- Based on: The Flower of Hawaii by Paul Abraham
- Produced by: Richard Oswald
- Starring: Marta Eggerth; Hans Fidesser; Iván Petrovich; Hans Junkermann
- Cinematography: Reimar Kuntze
- Edited by: Friedel Buckow
- Music by: Paul Abraham
- Production company: Rio-Film GmbH
- Release date: 21 March 1933 (Germany)
- Running time: 86 minutes
- Country: Germany
- Language: German

The Flower of Hawaii (German: Die Blume von Hawaii) is a 1933 German musical film directed by Richard Oswald and starring Mártha Eggerth and Iván Petrovich. The film was shot at the Tempelhof Studios in Berlin with sets designed by the art director Franz Schroedter. Location shooting took place on the French Riviera. It is an adaptation of the operetta The Flower of Hawaii by Paul Abraham. The operetta was later adapted again for a 1953 film. It is based on the life of the last Queen of Hawaii, Liliuokalani.

== Plot ==
Susanne Lamond, who earns her living as a cigarette girl in a cabaret in Paris, does not know that she is in fact a Hawaiian princess named Laya. Attaché Harald Stone from the United States falls in love with her and follows her when Liberation Movement agents lure her to Hawaii with a fake offer to perform as an artist. Here, according to the plans of the Hawaiian nationalists, she is to be married to Prince Lilo Taro, the pretender to the throne.

However, US Governor Harrison has a political agenda and plans to marry the prince to his niece Bessy to bolster US claims to the Pacific Islands. However, Bessy loves Harrison's secretary, Buffy. When the conspirators abduct Susanne to the old royal castle, where a big wedding ceremony is to take place, Susanne objects. She has long since fallen in love with the smart American and they both want to get married. She renounces all claims to the throne and titles and follows him. Eventually Bessy and Buffy become a couple too.

== Cast ==
- Martha Eggerth as Susanne Lamond
- Hans Fidesser as Lilo Taro
- Iván Petrovich as Captain Harald Stone
- Hans Junkermann as Governor Harrison
- Baby Gray as Bessy
- Ernő Verebes as Buffy, secretary
- Fritz Fischer as Jim Boy
- Ferdinand Hart as Kanako Hilo
- Eugen Rex as Kililo
- Carl Auen as Captain Taylor
- Georg John as Chief Priest of Hawaii
- Louis Brody

== Bibliography ==
- Klaus, Ulrich J. Deutsche Tonfilme: Jahrgang 1933. Klaus-Archiv, 1988.
