= Viki (operetta) =

Opera by Paul Abraham

Viki is a 1935 Hungarian operetta by Pál Ábrahám to a libretto by Imre Harmath and Adorján Bónyi. It premiered on 26 January 1935 at the National Theatre (Budapest) (or Magyar Színház).

== Synopsis ==
Viki is a headstrong, boisterous young woman who prefers to dress and act like a man. When she gets into an argument with the equally quarrelsome Feri, he fails to see through her disguise and challenges her to a duel, "man to man." During the duel Feri discovers Viki's true gender and instantly falls in love with her.

== Film ==
Two years after its premiere in Budapest, the operetta was made into a film in 1937 by the Hungarian director Márton Keleti, with Rosy Barsony as Viki, Paul Javor as Feri, Gyula Csortos as Hadhazy, and Lili Berky as Mme. Hadhazy.
