= The Land of Smiles =

1929 operetta by Franz Lehár

Das Land des Lächelns The Land of Smiles
- Operetta by Franz Lehár
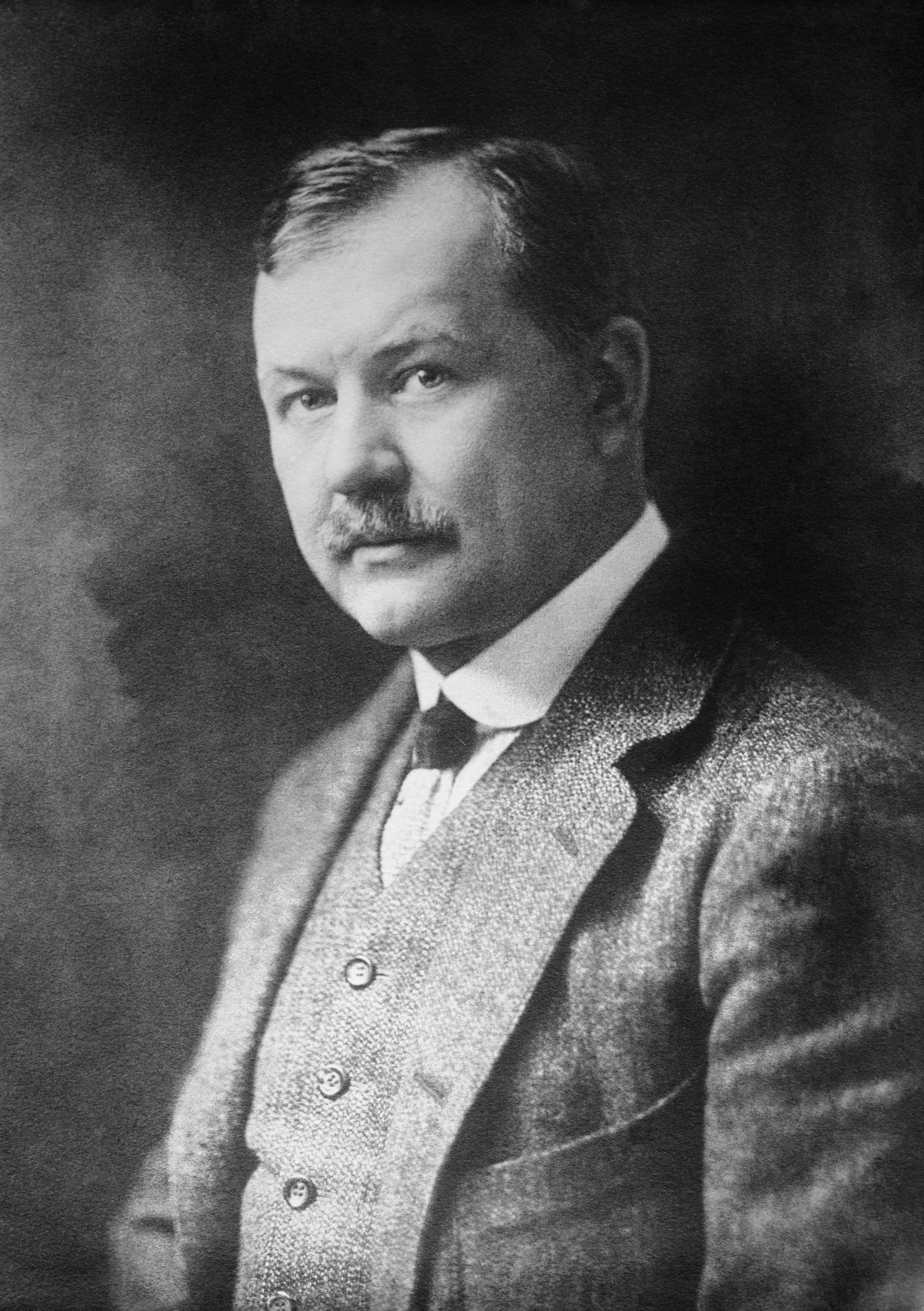
- The composer
- Librettist: Ludwig Herzer; Fritz Löhner-Beda
- Language: German
- Premiere: 10 October 1929; Metropol-Theater, Berlin (revised version)

The Land of Smiles (German: Das Land des Lächelns) is a 1929 romantic operetta in three acts by Franz Lehár. The German language libretto was by Ludwig Herzer and Fritz Löhner-Beda. The performance duration is about 100 minutes.

This was one of Lehár's later works, and has a bittersweet ending which the Viennese loved. The title refers to the supposed Chinese custom of smiling, whatever happens in life. The leading character, Prince Sou-Chong, has a song early in the show, "Immer nur lächeln" ("Always smiling") which describes this.

== The Tauberlied ==
Lavishly produced, the show was built largely around the performance of the tenor Richard Tauber, a close friend of Lehár, for whom he customarily wrote a Tauberlied – a signature tune exploiting the exceptional qualities of his voice – in each of his later operettas. On this occasion it was "Dein ist mein ganzes Herz" ("You are my heart's delight"), probably the most famous of all the Tauberlieder. Tauber also appeared in the show in London, singing many encores of his song.

== Performance history ==
The work was originally produced under the title Die gelbe Jacke (The Yellow Jacket). This was presented at the Theater an der Wien, Vienna, on 9 February 1923 with Hubert Marischka as Sou-Chong. It was not a great success, and Lehár later revised it, under the new title of Das Land des Lächelns, which was first performed, at the Metropol Theater, Berlin, on 10 October 1929. Tauber reprised his role in London (1931 and 1932) South Africa (1939) and New York (1946), as well as in Vienna in 1930 (again at the Theater an der Wien) and in 1938 (at the Vienna State Opera and also in Prague). Tauber also sang it in London and on tour throughout Britain between 1940 and 1942. The opera was first staged in the United States at the Boston Opera House in 1933 with soprano Nancy McCord as Lisa.

Sadler's Wells Opera produced it in London in the late 1950s, after the success of Lehár's The Merry Widow starring June Bronhill had rescued the company from bankruptcy. Starring Charles Craig, Elizabeth Fretwell and Bronhill, the show did not attract the same audiences as The Merry Widow.

In 1991, Takarazuka Revue's Snow Troupe performed a Japanese language version of Das Land des Lächelns. The production was adapted and directed by Nobuo Murakami, and starred Maki Ichiro as Prince Sou-Chong, Risa Junna as Lisa, and Yōka Wao as Gustav von Pottenstein.

In 2017 Opernhaus Zürich performed Das Land des Lächelns and recorded it on DVD and Blu-ray. During the 2020 coronavirus pandemic, they shared the recording for free to allow those in isolation to enjoy the opera.

== Roles ==
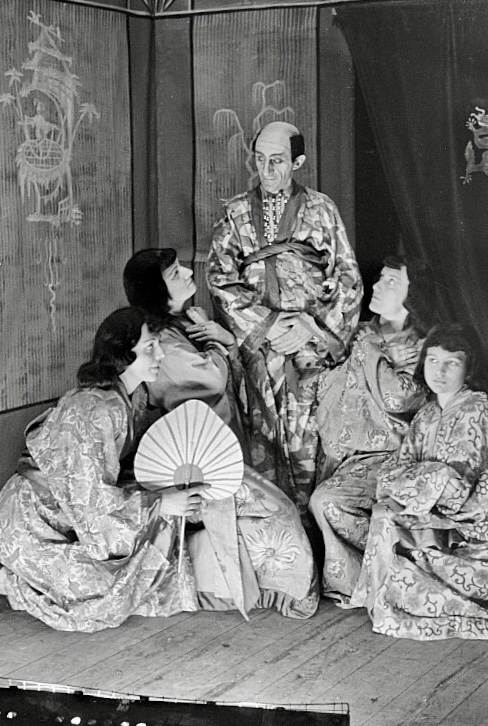
Berlin, 1930

Roles, voice types, premiere cast
Role	Voice type	Premiere cast, 9 February 1923 Conductor: Franz Lehár	Premiere cast, 10 October 1929 Conductor: Franz Lehár
Lisa, Count Ferdinand Lichtenfels' daughter	soprano	Louise Kartousch	Vera Schwarz
Count Gustav von Pottenstein	tenor	Josef König	Willi Stettner
Prince Sou-Chong	tenor	Hubert Marischka	Richard Tauber
Princess Mi, Sou-Chong's sister	soprano	Betty Fischer	Hella Kürty
Tschang, Sou-Chong's uncle	baritone		Adolf Edgar Licho
Chief eunuch	tenor		
Ling, head priest	baritone		
Count Ferdinand Lichtenfels	spoken		
Lore, Lisa's niece	spoken		
Officers, mandarins, friends, brides, servants, maids (Chorus, ballet, extras)

== Synopsis ==
The operetta is set in Vienna and China in 1912. In act 1 in Vienna, the heroine Countess Lisa marries a Chinese prince and returns with him to his homeland despite the warnings of her friends and family. In act 2, in Peking, she finds that she is unable to come to terms with his culture, and especially that he must take other wives. He assures her that it is just a formality, but unhappiness is inevitable, and she is locked in the palace. Her love changes to hate. In act 3, Prince Sou-Chong is left alone while his beloved Lisa returns to her homeland. His sister, Princess Mi had also become attached to the Viennese official Gustav, and so the ending is doubly sad. But the prince respects the rule of his custom: always smile.

== Film adaptations ==
The operetta was adapted into film several times.

- The Land of Smiles (1930) directed by Max Reichmann and starring Richard Tauber. Hella Kürty and Willi Stettner reprised their original stage roles of Mi and Gustl, while Lisa was sung by Margit Suchy, replacing Vera Schwarz who had sung in the original Berlin stage production.
- The Land of Smiles (1952) directed by Hans Deppe and Erik Ode and starring Mártha Eggerth and Jan Kiepura.
- In 1961, Gerhard Riedmann appeared in a television film where his singing voice was supplied by Fritz Wunderlich.
- Another television version was filmed in 1974 with René Kollo, Dagmar Koller, Heinz Zednik, directed by Arthur Maria Rabenalt.
- A version for Australian television aired in 1962.

== Recordings ==
- 1930: Paul Dessau; Richard Tauber (Sou-Chong), Margit Suchy (Lisa), Hella Kürty (Mi), Willy Stettner (Gustl), Georg John (Tschang); Label: Koch 3-1373-2 (CD)
- 1953: Otto Ackermann, Philharmonia Orchestra; Nicolai Gedda (Sou-Chong), Elisabeth Schwarzkopf (Lisa), Erich Kunz (Gustav), Emmy Loose (Mi). Originally on Columbia LPs 33CX 1114-5, various CD reissues.
- 1957: Jésus Etcheverry, Grand Orchestre et Choeurs René Alix, Tony Poncet (Sou-Chong), Renée Doria (Lisa), Henri Gui (Gustav), Lucie Dolène (Mi); Label: Philips CD 442 241-2 highlights only, in French
- 1961: Franz Marszalek, WDR Symphony Orchestra Cologne; Fritz Wunderlich (Sou-Chong), Antonia Fahberg (Lisa), Luise Cramer (Mi), Ernst Stankovski (Gustl), André Peysang (Tschang); Label: Gala Gl329 (CD)
- June 1967: Willy Mattes, Symphonie-Orchester Graunke; Nicolai Gedda (Sou-Chong), Anneliese Rothenberger (Lisa), Renate Holm (Mi), Harry Friedauer (Gustl), Jobst Moeller (Tschang); Label: EMI CMS 5 65372 2 (CD), CDMB 65372 (CD)
- April 1970: Yvon Leenart, Orchestre de l'Association des Concerts Lamoureux; Bernard Sinclair (Sou-Chong), Bernadette Antoine (Lisa), Sylvia Paule (Mi), Michel Dens (Gustl), Gilbert Guimay (Tschang); Label: EMI 74097(CD), in French (Le pays du sourire)
- 1982: Willi Boskovsky, Munich Radio Symphony Orchestra; Siegfried Jerusalem (Sou-Chong), Helen Donath (Lisa), Brigitte Lindner (Mi), Martin Finke (Gustl), Klaus Hirte (Tschang); Label: EMI 47604(CD), EMI 66376(CD)
- 1996: Richard Bonynge, English Chamber Orchestra, Nancy Gustafson (Lisa), Jerry Hadley (Sou-Chong), Naomi Itami (Mi), Lynton Atkinson (Gustl) Label: Telarc CD-80419, in English

There are also extracts in Franz Lehár Conducts Richard Tauber (1929–1931), with 6 tracks performed by Richard Tauber (Sou-Chong), Vera Schwarz (Lisa) and the Berlin State Opera Orchestra (Pearl CD).
