= Hector's House =

French children's television series, re-voiced in English by the BBC

- Genre: Puppets
- Created by: George Croses
- Country of origin: France
- Original language: French
- No. of series: 7
- No. of episodes: 78

Production
- Running time: 5 minutes
- Production company: Office de radiodiffusion-télévision française

Original release
- Network: 1ère chaine, BBC1, ARD's regional channels, ORF (1968-1978)
- Release: October 27, 1966 – November 13, 1970

Hector's House (French La Maison de Toutou and German Toutou) is a French children's television series using glove puppets. It was first broadcast in France on 1ère chaine on 27 October 1966 and ran over seven series and 78 episodes. It was re-voiced in English and broadcast on BBC1 on 9 September 1968 and repeated throughout the 1970s. Each episode lasted five minutes and it was regularly given the pre-six o'clock time slot that brought children's programmes to a close.

It was written and performed by Georges Croses with puppeteers Agnès Vannier and Georges Tournaire, using 60 cm (2') tall puppets on a garden set. The English version followed the French script faithfully with minor deviations.

== Characters and setting ==
Affable, but sometimes pompous, Hector the dog (named Toutou, literally meaning "doggie", in the original French version) lives in a house with a beautiful garden. He is a proud gardener and handyman, never far from his tool shed. The motherly, but mischievous, Zsazsa the cat (named Zouzou in the original) lives with him. Kiki the frog is a neighbour who constantly visits the garden through a hole in the garden wall and claims to be a meteorologist.

Hector desires order and tranquillity, and is always thinking up ways to improve himself and his garden. He is willing to assist his two friends in their activities, but often finds them at odds with his own. Kiki and Zsazsa also often play tricks on him, but he always takes this in good humour and ends each episode breaking the fourth wall to address the camera with his catchphrase: "I'm a great big [whatever he was] old Hector."

Although named after the house, all stories occur in the garden and action within the house is only seen through the open windows.

The humour employed is indebted to the French film comedies of Jacques Tati who often portrayed a man strangely at odds with his surroundings.

== Credits ==
The programme was broadcast entirely without credits, featuring only a short introductory theme tune (with birdsong accompaniment) and, in the French broadcasts, a short static frame at the end (with the same bird).

=== French ===
Actor Jacques Morel voiced Toutou, Actress Lucie Dolène voiced Zouzou and puppeteer Agnès Vannier was Kiki.

=== English ===
Hector was voiced by Paul Bacon. Kiki was voiced by Denise Bryer, who also had roles in Noddy, Terrahawks and Labyrinth. Zsa Zsa was voiced by Jane Wenham, who was unidentified for decades. This led to an urban myth that the character was voiced by Joanna Lumley, something she denied.

=== Music ===
The theme music, of which two versions were aired, was composed by Francis Lai.

== Episodes ==
The BBC episodes were not shown in the same order as the original French series.

=== Series 1 ===
No. overall	No. in season	French title	English title	French air date	UK air date
1	1	"La visite mystérieuse"	A Mysterious Visit	27 October 1966	9 September 1968
When Kiki climbs a ladder to peer over the garden wall, she accidentally drops her hat into Hector's garden. Hector discovers the hat in a tree, while planting carrot seeds. He declares that he is "a great, big puzzled old Hector".
2	2	"Bonjour grenouille"	Good Morning Frog	28 October 1966	10 September 1968
Still unaware that they have a neighbour, Hector and Zaza ponder the appearance of the little pink hat. Meanwhile, Kiki secretly enters the garden via a hole in the wall in order to find her hat. She becomes caught on a hook in the shed, and is discovered by Hector, who decides that he might tame her. An indignant Kiki says that she is tame already, and works for the Weather Forecasting Bureau in London. Kiki's hat is returned to her, and she asks to be friends with Hector and Zaza. Hector declares that he is "a great, big delighted old Hector".
3	3	"Les chardons"	The Thistles	29 October 1966	11 September 1968
Hector shows Kiki his vegetable plot, but she is more interested when Zaza shows her the flowers. Hector makes Kiki a necklace from a daisy, and crowns Zaza with pink flowers. But when he goes to pick a carnation for himself, he falls in the thistles. Zaza and Kiki laugh when poor Hector emerges covered in thistle heads. They try to pull them off, but Kiki mistakes Hector's nose for a thistle. Hector forgives her, saying that he is "a great, big generous old Hector".
4	4	"Le goûter"	The Snack	30 October 1966	16 September 1968
Hector and Zaza lay the garden table for tea with their guest Kiki. Zaza stops Hector from eating the cherries. Hector worries about the cakes, so Zaza goes to check them. Kiki arrives wearing her best Sunday hat. Hector volunteers to be head waiter. He pours water for Kiki and Zaza, and serves them the cakes. "Yum!, Yum!". Worried that there'll be none left, he says he doesn't want to be waiter anymore, but they've saved him some. Hector eats them up, saying he's "a big old greedy Hector".
5	5	"La météo"	The Weather Forecaster	31 October 1966	12 September 1968
While getting his hay in, Hector accuses Zaza of trying to bring on the rain by putting her paw behind her ear. Kiki, who claims to have a gift for weather forecasting, explains that Zaza can do that as often as she likes, it still won't rain. She teaches Hector that when a frog is at the top of a ladder, the weather will be fine, but that when she's at the bottom of the ladder it will rain. Hector tries this for himself, and is amazed to find it works. He joyfully announces, "I'm great, big weatherman Hector".
6	6	"Le puits"	The Well	1 November 1966	25 September 1968
The three friends are having fun playing with a ball, when it falls down the well. Hector bravely volunteers to fetch it by being lowered down the well in a bucket. When he emerges with the ball, he hands it to Kiki, but she drops it down the well again. Kiki asks for Hector's forgiveness. He replies that he's "a big kind old Hector". As he is descends again, he continues, "... but don't you push me too far!".
7	7	"Le grand sommeil"	Deep Sleep	2 November 1966	23 September 1968
Zaza is bored, and torments Hector while he's trying to sleep by the window. He gives up and sets about making a kennel, so that Miss Zaza won't be able to disturb him again. Zaza asks if he's really so angry with her. He replies, "No, all is forgiven ... I'm a big easy-going old Hector".
8	8	"La surprise"	The Surprise	3 November 1966	30 October 1968
Hector wants to give Zaza a nice surprise. He asks Kiki to help him install a garden swing, but he has difficulty concealing it from Zaza. He accuses her of hectoring him. Kiki fixes the ropes in the tree, and Hector fits the seat. He calls Zaza to see the finished swing. She says it's beautiful. Zaza and Kiki try it out. They sing, while Hector pushes them. Hector joins in, singing that he's "their big old favourite Hector".
9	9	"Vive l'ordre"	Keep This Garden Tidy	4 November 1966	5 November 1968
Hector tidies the house, throwing away some junk. Kiki lowers a basket of her things into the garden. Zaza and Kiki go to get their deck chairs. Hector sees Kiki's basket and tidies it away. He returns to see Zaza's chair - he tidies it away. When he returns again, Hector's sunshade and Kiki's chair have turned up - he puts those away too. Zaza and Kiki find all their things at the garden table. Hector sits them in their chairs, tidily. They move everything back to where they want, and laugh at Hector. He's "a great, big and furious old Hector".
10	10	"Le jeu de la météo"	The Weather Game	5 November 1966	11 November 1968
It's cloudy, and going to rain. Hector and Zaza resign themselves to staying indoors. Kiki has a new game for them to play on the veranda, called "The Weather Game". She describes it as being a bit like Snakes and Ladders. Hector doesn't like the sound of it - he's not a snake. The game has sunshine squares and disaster squares. Hector lands on "blizzard" - a disaster square. He throws again, and gets a double six, and wins. Hector denies cheating. He says he'd just invented a new rule, and declares, "I'm a great, big clever old hector".
11	11	"L'entonnoir"	The Funnel	6 November 1966	12 November 1969
Hector makes a garden chair for Kiki. Kiki goes to fetch his pliers for him, but is distracted by interesting things in the shed. She improvises various objects as headwear. When Hector goes to see why she is taking so long, he is shocked to find a big funnel, walking. When Kiki is revealed, she tells how the funnel swallowed her up when she tried it on as a hat. Hector laughs, but proceeds to add a second no-entry sign to his shed, forbidding entry to frogs, as well as cats. He explains that he's "a great, big cautious old Hector".
12	12	"La niche"	The Kennel	7 November 1966	24 September 1968
Hector goes for a nap in his new kennel, which is now under the apple tree. Zaza and Kiki climb the tree, but in doing so, they cause apples to fall onto the kennel, waking Hector. He moves the kennel away from the tree. While he is fetching more straw, Zaza and Kiki inspect the kennel. They both approve, and Zaza fetches a cushion for herself. When Hector returns, he finds Zaza asleep inside. Kiki placates Hector by making him a bed of straw outside his kennel. Hector promises not to disturb Zaza, saying that he's "a big kind old Hector ... too kind".
13	13	"Jalousie"	Jealousy	8 November 1966	10 October 1968
Kiki admires how graceful Zaza is, as she strolls with her parasol. Hector dismisses Zaza's activities as being not as useful as his, but grabs Zaza's sunshade and struts about with it himself in an unsuccessful attempt to impress Kiki. Kiki also loves the way Zaza climbs a tree "just like a little squirrel". Hector responds by climbing a tree too, but he has to use a ladder, and he falls. When he gets up, Zaza and Kiki sing about being satisfied with nature's differences. Hector relents: "Well then, I'm satisfied with being a big old Hector ... not a cat".

=== Series 2 ===
No. overall	No. in season	French title	English title	French air date	UK air date
14	1	"Le collier"	The Lead	5 December 1966	26 September 1968
15	2	"Le pyjama"	The Pyjamas	6 December 1966	23 October 1968
16	3	"Cache cache"	Playing Tag	7 December 1966	28 October 1968
Hector suggests playing Hide and Seek, but Kiki hasn't played before, and she doesn't understand Hector's rules. They proceed anyway. Hector is "it". He counts to 30, while Zaza and Kiki hide in the bushes. Hector looks for them in his kennel to no avail. Zaza and Kiki then both make it to the tree to beat him. Hector concedes that he's "a beaten old Hector ... who's still "it"".
17	4	"La confiture"	Jam Making	8 December 1966	4 November 1968
18	5	"La chenille"	The Caterpillar	9 December 1966	16 October 1968
19	6	"La pêche"	Fishing	10 December 1966	18 September 1968
20	7	"L'accroc"	The Torn Coat	11 December 1966	19 September 1968
21	8	"Le tuba"	The Tuba	12 December 1966	3 October 1968
22	9	"Le parfum"	The Perfume	13 December 1966	17 November 1969
23	10	"La brouille"	The Disagreement	14 December 1966	8 October 1968
24	11	"Toutou malade"	Hector is ill	15 December 1966	7 October 1968
25	12	"Les bonnes manières"	Good Manners	16 December 1966	1 October 1968
26	13	"Fouette cocher"	The Coach	17 December 1966	20 November 1968

=== Series 3 ===
No. overall	No. in season	French title	English title	French air date	UK air date
27	1	"La sieste"	The Siesta	19 March 1967	17 September 1968
28	2	"Le bon gardien"	The Watchdog	20 March 1967	30 September 1968
29	3	"La peinture"	Painting	21 March 1967	19 November 1968
30	4	"Le cochon"	Pig	22 March 1967	31 October 1968
31	5	"Le petit canard"	The Little Duck	23 March 1967	12 November 1968
32	6	"La gymnastique"	Exercises	24 March 1967	13 November 1968
33	7	"Toutou se concentre"	Hector Thinks Hard	25 March 1967	29 October 1968
34	8	"La circulation"	Traffic Regulations	26 March 1967	13 November 1969
35	9	"Zouzou s'en va"	Zaza Goes Away	27 March 1967	6 November 1968
36	10	"Soleil couchant"	The Setting Sun	28 March 1967	7 November 1968
37	11	"Chien méchant"	Naughty Dog	29 March 1967	2 October 1968
38	12	"L'arrosage"	The Hosepipe	30 March 1967	22 October 1968
39	13	"La musique"	Music	31 March 1967	9 October 1968

=== Series 4 ===
No. overall	No. in season	French title	English title	French air date	UK air date
40	1	"Plus vite toujours plus vite"	Faster, Faster	18 June 1967	21 November 1968
41	2	"Basket pommes"	The Basket	19 June 1967	25 November 1968
42	3	"L'herbier"	The Botanist	20 June 1967	26 November 1968
Zaza and Kiki ask Hector to look at some plants they've picked, but Hector says he is not very interested in plants. He changes his tune when they say they are making a collection of wild flowers - he likes collecting things. He fetches the big scrap book, and Kiki gets her nature book to identify the plants. Zaza and Kiki finish picking plants, but Hector says there aren't enough. Hector hacks the garden with a scythe, and creates a big heap of plants to classify. He concludes that he's "a big old plant and flower-collecting Hector now".
43	4	"Aubade à Kiki"	Wake Up Kiki	21 June 1967	27 November 1968
44	5	"La tirelire"	The Piggy Bank	22 June 1967	28 November 1968
Hector comes back from town with a present for all of them. They unwrap it to reveal a piggy bank. Hector says it will be a good way of saving for their holidays. Zaza and Kiki are delighted to hear it play music when they insert their coins. After dismissing Zaza's idea of playing a forfeit game, Hector suggests that he sells them his vegetables, but put the money in the piggy bank. Zaza and Kiki realise Hector hasn't contributed anything himself. He doesn't like it when they coax him into donating a coin. He explains that he's "a big stingy old Hector".
45	6	"L'épouvantail"	Scarecrow	23 June 1967	2 December 1968
46	7	"La photographie"	Photography	24 June 1967	3 December 1968
After Zaza arranges flowers for Kiki's hat, Hector has an idea. He gets Zaza and Kiki to pose by a tree and fetches his Grandad's camera from the loft. He's about to take a photo, when Kiki goes to get her accordion. He tries again, but his instruction to "Watch the birdie!" prompts the pair to look for a bird in the camera. He asks them to step back, but when they do they fall into the pond. He laughs, and takes a "marvellous" picture of them in the water. He declares, "I'm old Hector the photographer".
47	8	"Le pique nique"	The Picnic	26 June 1967	4 December 1968
48	9	"Le savon"	The Soap	26 June 1967	5 December 1968
Hector doesn't want Zaza to know he's got dirty doing a bit of cleaning. He changes into his swimsuit and fetches the soap, before cleaning his overalls in the pond. He drops the soap in the water. Kiki sees him splashing about and asks if he's having a swim. Hector explains that he's trying to get the soap. She volunteers to dive in and fetch it for him. Zaza investigates the goings-on and asks him why he's wearing a swimsuit. Hector lies, saying he was having a swim. With his face still dirty, he says, "I'm such a great, big clean old Hector".
49	10	"Le secret de Toutou"	Hector's Secret	28 June 1967	18 November 1969
50	11	"Et pourtant elle roule"	It Works, What's More	29 June 1967	19 November 1969
51	12	"On soigne Kiki"	Looking After Kiki	27 July 1967	14 November 1968

=== Series 5 ===
No. overall	No. in season	French title	English title	French air date	UK air date
52	1	"Le joyeux retour"	Happy Returns	11 October 1967	18 November 1968
The trio sing about their seaside holiday, as Hector drives them home in his yellow vintage car. When they get home, they remark on how the plants have grown since they've been away. The thought of being shut up in the house again doesn't appeal to Hector. They unload the car, and Hector finds his souvenir seashell. They sing about seeing the sea again in their dreams, when they sleep tonight. Hector says, "I'm a great big dreamy old Hector".
53	2	"Le silence est d'or"	Silence Is Golden	12 October 1967	24 November 1969
Zaza sings while she waters the flowers, prompting Hector to go to his kennel to meditate. When Zaza and Kiki disturb him, Hector accuses them of being chatterboxes. He organises a silence contest to find the biggest chatterbox. He accuses Kiki, when she laughs, but Zaza points out that Hector is the only one to have spoken. When he tells Zaza and Kiki to stop yawning, Hector is accused of being the chatterbox again, and he storms off. They end by teasing Hector into saying his catchphrase. He gives in and says, "I'm a great, big silent old Hector".
54	3	"Colin maillard"	Blind Man's Buff	13 October 1967	25 November 1969
55	4	"La citrouille"	The Pumpkin	14 October 1967	26 November 1969
56	5	"La chasse aux papillons"	Chasing Butterflies	15 October 1967	24 October 1968
57	6	"Les boîtes"	The Boxes	16 October 1967	27 November 1969
58	7	"Le piège"	The Trap	17 October 1967	1 December 1969
59	8	"Le beau chandail rouge"	The Sweater	18 October 1967	29 December 1969
Hector is impatient for Zaza to finish knitting him a red sweater. It's soon ready to try on, and fits perfectly. He requests a matching hat. He snags the sweater on a nail, and fails to see it unravel while he goes round the garden calling for the mocking bird to see his new sweater. Zaza and Kiki finish his hat. They follow the wool trail to find poor Hector with his lovely sweater unravelled. Zaza offers to remake it, and Hector asks her to hurry because he's "a great, big chilly old Hector".
60	9	"La potiche"	The Porcelain Vase	19 October 1967	3 December 1969
61	10	"Aïe ma patte"	Ouch My Paw	21 October 1967	8 December 1969
62	11	"Les 24 heures du Mans"	The Le Mans Race	22 October 1967	9 December 1969
63	12	"Les leçons"	Lessons	23 October 1967	10 December 1969

=== Series 6 ===
No. overall	No. in season	French title	English title	French air date	UK air date
64	1	"La querelle"	The Quarrel	2 December 1967	11 December 1969
Zaza and Kiki climb the walnut tree to pick nuts. They overhear Hector saying that cats have a knack of disappearing when there's work to be done. Zaza mocks him for saying so. Hector gets hot under the collar, calling Zaza an alley cat. Kiki calms them down, persuading them to give each other their paw. The quarrel isn't over though. Hector whacks the tree with a stick, and laughs when walnuts land on Zaza's head. Kiki tries to intervene again, but Hector drags her away, saying he enjoys quarrelling. Zaza agrees. Hector says he's "a great, big quarrelsome old Hector".
65	2	"Un bon remède"	A Good Remedy	3 December 1967	2 December 1969
Hector and Zaza have toothache from eating too many nuts. Hector is inconsolable. Kiki brings some games round to take their minds off the pain. Hector likes the toy cars, but the pain is still too much for him. Kiki tries playing her accordion, but to no avail. They try crayons. Hector draws a sad-looking Zaza, and Zaza draws Hector. When they see each other's pictures, their laughter takes away their pain. Laughing at his picture, Hector says, "I'm a great, big ugly old Hector".
66	3	"La boîte aux lettres"	The Letterbox	4 December 1967	16 December 1969
Kiki shows Hector a postcard that she's received from her friend Rebecca - a frog who works in the Weather Forecasting Bureau in New York. Hector is sad that he hasn't had any letters himself. He decides he needs a letterbox, and starts making one. He hangs it on the gate. Zaza and Kiki write a letter to him, and put it in the letterbox. Hector is delighted. He reads it out, "You're a great big old Hector, but Kiki and Zaza are a lot nicer than you". Hector calls it rubbish, saying he's "a great big, very, very, very nice old Hector".
67	4	"Opération survie"	Operation Survival	5 December 1967	17 December 1969
Hector takes some cheese to eat outside. Zaza accuses him of eating all day long, and wonders how he would survive on a desert island. To prove he would have no problem, Hector decides to live "shipwrecked" in the garden, getting his food from fishing and hunting. Zaza brings him his hat and blanket. He fails to catch a fish, so gets a carrot from his vegetable plot. Hector abandons the operation, when he's distracted by Zaza and Kiki having some cake. He says he can survive just as well by eating a cake as not eating it. He's "big old Hector, the survivor".
68	5	"Chanson de la nuit"	A Song At Night	6 December 1967	18 December 1969
Zaza and Hector close the shutters for the night. Dressed in her night clothes, Zaza takes a candle with her into the garden, and sings in the moonlight. Kiki joins her explaining that all the little frogs in the pond give a concert at night. Hector comes out in his pyjamas and joins in, singing nonsense rhymes. He sings he'd "rather be instead, all tucked up warm in bed". Zaza and Kiki bid each other good night. Hector retires saying, "I'm a big old early-rising Hector".
69	6	"La cloche"	The Bell	7 December 1967	7 January 1970
Hector adds a bell to the garden gate. To test it out, he calls Kiki round, but blocks her usual hole-in-the-wall entrance. Kiki is upset to find it deliberately blocked. When she comes to the gate, that's bolted too, and she goes away sobbing. Hector apologises and shows her the new bell, before inviting her in. Kiki refuses and laughs, saying she would rather use her little door. Hector installs a little bell by Kiki's door, telling her, "I shall always remain your great faithful old Hector".
70	7	"Un valeureux pompier"	Hector The Brave Fireman	8 December 1967	28 December 1969
Hector is in his fireman outfit, and is frantically filling buckets with water to pour on the log pile. He explains to Kiki it's just a drill. Zaza says he's not very modern though, because he doesn't have a fire engine. Hector fetches his car, and asks Kiki and Zaza to paint it red, while he adds a hose and ladder. They take the finished fire engine for a trial run. Hector climbs the ladder bravely, hose in paw, and states, "I'm a big old fireman Hector, first class".
71	8	"Trop tard Toutou"	Hector Is Too Late	9 December 1967	30 December 1969
Hector and Zaza finish sawing wood for the winter. Hector organises Zaza and Kiki with the stacking of the logs. He makes them carry basketfuls of them on their backs. Hector fetches a wheel barrow to help, but is distracted by its squeeky wheel. By the time he's fixed it, he's too late - Zaza and Kiki have finished the stacking. Hector is impressed with himself, and announces, "I'm great, big old Hector, the good organiser".
72	9	"Un étrange étranger"	A Strange Stranger	10 December 1967	8 January 1970
Zaza and Kiki don't believe Hector when he says he has relatives all over the world, including a Scottish cousin. He promptly fetches a mysterious suitcase and goes for a walk. A short while later, "his Scottish cousin" pays a visit, playing bagpipes. Zaza and Kiki humour Hector as he pretends to be his cousin. When the "real" Hector is back, he refuses to own up to the pretence, claiming that it wasn't him, it was "a great, big Scottish MacHector".
73	10	"Kiki perche"	Treetop Kiki	11 December 1967	6 January 1970
Zaza and Kiki are playing "It", when they run into Hector's vegetable plot. Hector says that game is boring, so they play one which starts with the last one off the ground being "it". Kiki climbs to the top of a tree, but she can't get down. Hector comes to the rescue with his fire-engine ladder. He's "a great big life-saving old Hector".
74	11	"Le pense Toutou"	Hector Never Forgets	12 December 1967	5 January 1970
Hector returns from shopping, but he's forgotten Zaza's scissors and Kiki's writing paper. Zaza ties a knot in his handkerchief to remind him to go shopping again tomorrow. Hector then puts "forget-me-not" labels everywhere to remind him of all the jobs he needs to do, but the sight of them all depresses him, and he decides to go to bed. As Hector is about to retire, Zaza asks if there's something else. Hector replies, "Oh yes!". He turns to the camera and says, "I nearly forgot to say it to you. I'm a great, big old Hector saying good night".
75	12	"Une merveilleuse invention"	The Marvellous Invention	13 December 1967	1 January 1970
Hector is on the veranda, designing a complicated gadget. Zaza and Kiki go to play on the swing, which gives Hector an idea. He finishes welding a couple of buckets, and they all help to assemble his contraption in the garden. Hector connects it to his rocking chair with a rope, and instructs Zaza and Kiki to climb into the buckets. The buckets act as swings which rock Hector's chair for him. He's "a great, big lazy old Hector".
76	13	"Trois petits sapins de Noël"	The Three Christmas Trees	14 December 1967	23 December 1969
Hector returns with a Christmas tree, which he plants in the garden as a surprise for Zaza. Zaza returns with her own tree, which she leaves in front of the house. Hector discovers Zaza's tree and plants it, thinking he must have imagined planting his own tree. He's astonished to see there are two trees. Kiki appears with a third tree, and plants it next to the other two. Just as Hector realises there hasn't been a miracle, the three trees miraculously decorate themselves. They all sing about Christmas and presents. Hector claims he's "great big, good-as-gold old Hector".

=== Series 7 ===
No. overall	No. in season	French title	English title	French air date	UK air date
77	1	"Bonne route Toutou"	Good Journey	27 August 1970	20 November 1969
78	2	"L'œuvre d'art"	The Work Of Art	13 November 1970	4 December 1969

== Home media ==
A number of VHS and DVDs have since been released with a selection of episodes across the series in no particular order.

- VHS 1993 - 60min - Polygram Video "Pocket Money Video"
- DVD 2001 - 30 Episodes - Contender
