= The Flower of Hawaii (1953 film) =

1953 film

- Film poster
- German: Schwiegersöhne
- Directed by: Géza von Cziffra
- Written by: Paul Abraham (operetta); Géza von Cziffra
- Produced by: Otto Meissner; Géza von Cziffra
- Starring: Maria Litto; Rudolf Platte; Marina Ried
- Cinematography: Willy Winterstein
- Edited by: Hermann Leitner
- Music by: Paul Abraham; Michael Jary
- Production company: Arion-Film
- Distributed by: Deutsche London-Film
- Release date: 18 December 1953
- Running time: 94 minutes
- Country: West Germany
- Language: German

The Flower of Hawaii (German: Die Blume von Hawaii) is a 1953 West German musical film directed by Géza von Cziffra and starring Maria Litto, Rudolf Platte and Marina Ried. It uses the music of the operetta The Flower of Hawaii by Paul Abraham, but the story was rewritten. Unlike the 1933 film The Flower of Hawaii, this film is not based on the life of the last Queen of Hawaii Liliuokalani. It is part of the tradition of operetta films.

The film's sets were designed by the art director Albrecht Becker and Herbert Kirchhoff. It was shot at the Wandsbek Studios in Hamburg. Location shooting took place in Cannes and Nice.

== Cast ==
- Maria Litto as Princess Lia
- William Stelling as William Stelling
- Ursula Justin as Pepsy
- Rudolf Platte as Bebe
- Paul Westermeier as Director Winterwind
- Marina Ried as Marlene Elling
- Ilja Glusgal as Bob
- Lonny Kellner as Gloria
- Madelon Truß as Madame Biller
- Alice Treff as Frau Studienrat Rathje
- Inge Drexel as Mizzi Schikaneder
- Joseph Offenbach as Salvatore
- K.A. Jung as Buhnenarchitekt
- Edith Schollwer as Eine Blode Sängerin
- Erna Sellmer as Frau Müller
- Werner Dahms as Niki
- Joachim Teege as Otto-Heinz
- Horst von Otto as Inspizient
- Hans Schwarz Jr. as Heini
- Max Walter Sieg as Bühnenportier
- Benno Sterzenbacher as Eine dicker Journalist
- Carl Voscherau as Onkel Jensen
- Gerhard Heinrich as Tobias Müller
- Xenia Grey as singer
- Bruce Low as singer
- Lentini Brothers as acrobat
- Guenter Schnittjer as singer
- Kilima Hawaiians as singer
- Margarete Slezak as singer
- Lani Moe as lead dancer
- Dorina Naniola Moe as singer, dancer
- Tau Moe as singer
- Rose Moe as singer, dancer
- Margret Neuhaus as Editha Knefke

== Bibliography ==
- Traubner, Richard. Operetta: A Theatrical History. Routledge, 2003.
