= Tau Moe =

- Tau, Rose and Lani Moe returning to Honolulu 1947

Background information
- Birth name: Tau Moe
- Born: August 13, 1908 American Samoa
- Died: June 24, 2004 (aged 95) Laie, Hawaii
- Genres: Hawaiian
- Occupation(s): Singer, musician
- Instrument(s): Vocals, steel guitar
- Years active: 1920–2004
- Labels: Decca; Telefunken; Rounder

Tau Moe ("Papa Tau") (pronounced Mo-ay) (August 13, 1908 – June 24, 2004) was a singer and musician who formed The Tau Moe Family musical troupe which toured the globe for decades.

== Early life ==
Tau Moe (pronounced Mo-ay) was born August 13, 1908 in American Samoa to Savea Aupiu Moe and Talalupelele Lupe Tuitogama’atoe. The Moe family were of the Mormon faith. Some biographical details have variances from source to source. A 1947 item in the Honolulu Star Bulletin reported that Tau was sent alone to Hawaii for his education. Historian John W. Troutman, Curator of American Music at the Smithsonian Institution's National Museum of American History, stated that the entire family moved to Laie, Oahu, Hawaii in 1919, near the Mormon Laie Hawaii Temple. Troutman speculated that it was more likely the 1918 flu pandemic, rather than religion, that motivated the move.

Born into a family grounded in church music, Tau was influenced by the "kīkā kila" – the lap steel guitar – also known as the Hawaiian guitar. He enjoyed listening to early recordings of Joseph Kekuku and others who were proficient on the instrument. He soon crafted his own version of the kīkā kila by adapting a mail-order Montgomery Ward guitar.

Tau and his friends loitered around a music store, memorizing songs from demo records played by customers, trying to duplicate the music. He gravitated towards the stylings of guitarists Pale K. Lua, Frank Ferera and Sol Hoʻopiʻi. Decades later, he would recall being impressed when watching Hoʻopiʻi perform live.

== Family musical troupe ==
At the time Tau met Madame Claude Riviere, she was a professor of the French language at the University of Hawaiʻi at Mānoa, who had traveled throughout the Asia-Pacific area. Riviere's home adjacent to McKinley High School was partially converted in 1927 into a theatre catering to the tourist trade. Local musicians, including Tau's uncles Tauvivi, Fuifui, and Pulu, were part of her show. In his 1990 biographical story for The Hawaiian Steel Guitar Association Newsletter, Tau related how his uncle Pulu got him a $2-a-day job with Riviere to play on weekends. During the weekdays he still attended school in Laie; 1927 would have been his senior year of high school. The crowds soon grew to 200 attendees, and Riviere booked the show at the newly opened Royal Hawaiian Hotel.

Tau moved from Laie to Honolulu and worked at a full-time job. He took steel guitar lessons from M. K. Moke, a friend of one of his uncles. Depending on when he related the story, it was either one lesson for $20, or multiple lessons for an unknown sum. Through Moke, he met fellow steel guitar student and future wife Rose Ka‘ohu from Kohala, Hawaii. At the time, Rose was a seasoned performer who could sing, dance, and play an instrument. Along with her sisters, she was part of the John Kameaaloha Almeida shows. When Riviere opted to take her show on a tour of Asia, Rose auditioned and became part of the troupe. Rose and Tau married shortly after the tour left Honolulu. She went into labor in the middle of a performance in Kyoto, and their son Lani was born on July 13, 1929.

Riviere's troupe broke up during the tour, partially due to her financial difficulties. Most of the troupe signed on with Ernest Kaʻai. Tau and Rose split off into their own act. The Moe family spent the next decade performing around the world before World War II broke out, staying long enough in several areas to become fluent in multiple languages. By the time he was 4 years old, Lani was performing on stage with his parents.

=== World War II ===
In his later years, Tau related that the family had been in and out of Germany for 40 years. During World War II, the Moe family assisted with collections for Winterhilfswerk (Winter Help), a fund for German orphans. In recognition for their charity work, the family was summoned to meet Adolf Hitler. Although Rose and Tau were not comfortable with meeting him, they were powerless to do anything when Hitler arranged for Lani to ride in the Winterhilfswerk parade in his state limousine.

The Moe family helped smuggle a friend's valuables out of (Germany), partially by Rose wearing three fur coats and explaining to the border guards that people from Hawaii were not acclimated to the cold in Germany. Tau and Rose and family were very compassionate, helping Jews escape from Germany prior to World War II, by dressing them up in the Moe family's stage costumes. At one point, the family lived over a Jewish-owned bookstore. They were captive witnesses when the Gestapo made a late-night raid burning not only the store's contents, but also burned the store's owners alive atop the pile of burning books. The Gestapo had learned of the Moe family's underground efforts on behalf of the Jews and were in transit to arrest the family when, warned by friends, the family slipped out the stage back door and escaped.

=== Post war years ===
The troupe performed for international figures including Winston Churchill, Aristotle Onassis and King Farouk. They were introduced to Mohandas Gandhi while performing in India. Daughter Dorian was born in Calcutta during the 1946 Bihar riots; Rose went into labor and was rushed to the hospital by the military. Tau and Lani finished their show, and afterwards also taken to the hospital by the military. In August 1947, the Moe family returned to Hawaii for the first time since 1928. While in Hawaii, they performed at Club Pago Pago on Beretania Street.

After the war, the Tau Moe Trio (Tau, Rose, Lani) entertained at US military bases, booked through the Frankfort, Germany military post, "... Hawaiians who did one of the wildest routines ever to hit the EC." The Tau Moe Trio, and his uncle's Pulu Moe Trio, were booked for an extensive run in London with orchestra leader Felix Mendelssohn, namesake descendant of German composer Felix Mendelssohn.

== Later life and legacy ==
Moe was an influential pioneer of the Hawaiian steel guitar who along with his wife Rose formed the core of troupe. The group's success coincided with increased interest in Polynesia due in part to colonialism, and exemplified by cultural fads like Tiki bars and Tiki culture. In 1988, ethnomusicologist Bob Brozman collaborated with the Moe family in producing a new recording of their songs. Released in 1989, Brozman played steel guitar, with Rose on lead vocals, Tau on rhythm guitar, Dorian on second guitar, and Lani on ukulele. The album was included in the Library of Congress American Folklife Center American Folk Music and Folklore Recordings.

Rose Moe died December 18, 1998. She was afflicted with Alzheimer's disease in the last few years of her life. After the family's return to Hawaii, Lani became a dance instructor at Brigham Young University–Hawaii. He died in 2002. Tau died June 24, 2004.

== Discography ==
- Twilight in Hawaii: Legends of Hawaiian Music (2002) CD 90203 (Sounds of the World)
- Paradise Isle (2001) CD HQ CD 162 (Harlequin UK)
- Ho'Omana'o I Na Mele O Ka Wa U'i (Remembering the Songs of Our Youth) (1992) CD 6028 (Rounder)
- E-Liliu-E, Hula / South Sea Sadie 78 RPM F.B. 3512 (Columbia Graphaphone)

== Filmography ==
- The Flower of Hawaii (1953) (Tau, Rose, Lani, Dorian Moe)

== Awards ==
2004 (Tau Moe as an individual) Living Treasures of Hawai'i – Honpa Hongwanji Mission of Hawaii

== See also ==
Josefa Moe (1933–2006) – Tau's nephew, the original Moki from the Hawaiian Punch commercials.

== Bibliography ==
- Broughton, Simon; Ellingham, Mark; Trillo, Richard (1999). World Music: Latin & North America, Caribbean, India, Asia and Pacific. Rough Guides. ISBN 978-1-85828-636-5. "tau moe."
- Brozman, Bob (1993). The History and Artistry of National Resonator Instruments. Centerstream Publications. ISBN 978-1-4768-2539-7.
- Kohl, Randall C. (Autumn 1991). "Reviewed Work: The Tau Moe Family with Bob Brozman. Ho'omana'o I Na Mele O Ka Wā U'i. Remembering the Songs of Our Youth". Ethnomusicology. 35 (3). Society of Ethnomusicology: 445–447. doi:10.2307/851982. JSTOR 851982.
- Ruymar, Lorene (1996). "The Tau Moe Family Story as told by Tau Moe". The Hawaiian Steel Guitar and Its Great Hawaiian Musicians. Centerstream Publications. pp. 33–38, 164. ISBN 978-1-57424-021-4.
- Troutman, John W. (2016). Kika Kila: How the Hawaiian Steel Guitar Changed the Sound of Modern Music. Chapel Hill, NC: University of North Carolina Press. pp. 108, 112–25, 116 (ill.). ISBN 978-1-4696-2793-9.
