= Aladdin and His Magic Lamp (1970 film) =

1970 film

- Theatrical release poster
- Directed by: Jean Image
- Written by: France Image; Jean Image
- Starring: Gaston Guez; Henri Virlojeux; Claire Guibert; René Hiéronimus; Lucie Dolène; Fred Pasquali; Georges Atlas; Richard Francoeur; Michel Gudin; Paul Guez; Jean-Pierre Leroux; Lita Recio
- Cinematography: Per Olaf Csongova
- Music by: Fred Freed
- Production company: Films Jean Image
- Distributed by: Paramount Pictures
- Release dates: 28 January 1970 (France); 1 July 1975 (U.S.)
- Running time: 71 minutes
- Country: France
- Language: French

Aladdin and His Magic Lamp (French: Aladin et la Lampe Merveilleuse) is a 1970 French animated film directed by Jean Image. It is loosely based on the Arabian Nights tale of Aladdin. Made by Image's fifty-artist crew on a limited schedule in 1969 (from April to November of that year), the film proved successful with children upon its original release.

Paramount Pictures, who picked up the American rights for the film, released it on July 1, 1975, as part of its Saturday "Family Matinee" cinema program. It was Image's second and final film to receive a theatrical U.S. release as his other films after it were released direct-to-video.

== Voice cast ==
Character	Original	English
African magician	Henri Virlojeux	Gordon Heath

- Jean-Pierre Leroux as adult Aladdin
- Claire Guibert as mother of Aladdin
- René Hiéronimus as Hou-hou
- Lucie Dolène as princess
- Fred Pasquali as the genie of the ring, master of darkness and grand vizier
- Georges Atlas as the genie of the lamp
- Richard Francoeur as the sultan
- Michel Gudin as the narrator
- Paul Guez as Aladdin as child
- Lita Recio as Can-Can

== See also ==
- Lists of animated feature films
