= Operetta film =

Film genre

Operetta films (German: Operettenfilm) are a genre of musical films associated with, but not exclusive to, German language cinema. The genre began in the late 1920s, but its roots stretch back into the tradition of nineteenth century Viennese operettas.

Although some silent films had based their plots on stage operettas, the genre was largely a result of the switch from silent to sound films. The first all-talking operetta was The Desert Song (1929). This operetta had been filmed late in 1928 and was released early in 1929. The 1929 film Melody of the Heart, made by the German studio UFA, is credited as being the first all-talking "operetta film" made in Europe. It had been intended as a silent film, but the dramatic arrival of sound forced its production to be switched. Its combination of music and dancing proved to be a successful formula, and it was followed by many similar films.

During the 1930s the trend spread to Britain, where a number of Operetta films were made (often in co-productions with German or Austrian studios), France and the United States. Many German émigré film-makers following the Nazi rise to power in 1933 were able to find work in other countries because of their experience in the genre. In the United States, a popular run of Operetta films were made starring Jeanette MacDonald and Nelson Eddy. In Britain the 1934 Richard Tauber film Blossom Time was a major hit, spawning a number of imitations.

== Selected films ==
- The Desert Song (1929)
- The Love Parade (1929)
- Rio Rita (1929)
- Melody of the Heart (1929)
- Bride of the Regiment (1930)
- Song of the West (1930)
- The Rogue Song (1930)
- Song of the Flame (1930)
- Golden Dawn (1930)
- The Vagabond King (1930)
- The Lottery Bride (1930)
- Sweet Kitty Bellairs (1930)
- Viennese Nights (1930)
- Dixiana (1930)
- The Land of Smiles (1930)
- New Moon (1930)
- Monte Carlo (1930)
- Retreat on the Rhine (1930)
- Kiss Me Again (1931)
- One Heavenly Night (1931)
- Children of Dreams (1931)
- Victoria and Her Hussar (1931)
- The Love Express (1931)
- The Emperor's Sweetheart (1931)
- The Merry Wives of Vienna (1931)
- Der Kongreß tanzt (1931)
- Mamsell Nitouche (1932)
- Gräfin Mariza (1932)
- Goodnight, Vienna (1932)
- Love Me Tonight (1932)
- Passionately (1932)
- Bitter Sweet (1933)
- Bon Voyage (1933)
- There Is Only One Love (1933)
- A Southern Maid (1933)
- The Tsarevich (1933)
- The Queen's Affair (1934)
- A Night in Venice (1934)
- Princess Charming (1934)
- Roses from the South (1934)
- Waltzes from Vienna (1934)
- Frasquita (1934)
- The Voice of Love (1934)
- Blossom Time (1934)
- Two Hearts in Waltztime (1934)
- Music in the Air (1934)
- Maskerade (1934)
- The Merry Widow (1934)
- Ball at the Savoy (1935)
- Eva (1935)
- Naughty Marietta (1935)
- Heart's Desire (1935)
- The Blonde Carmen (1935)
- Happy Arenas (1935)
- I Dream Too Much (1935)
- Rose Marie (1936)
- Dreams Come True (1936)
- You Are Me (1936)
- Chaste Susanne (1937)
- Maytime (1937)
- The Lilac Domino (1937)
- The Girl of the Golden West (1938)
- Roxy and the Wonderteam (1938)
- Sweethearts (1938)
- The Mikado (1939)
- Opera Ball (1939)
- New Moon (1940)
- Bitter Sweet (1940)
- Operetta (1940)
- The Chocolate Soldier (1941)
- Mistress Moon (1941)
- Vienna Blood (1942)
- The Desert Song (1943)
- Silva (1944)
- Viennese Girls (1945)
- Waltz Time (1945)
- The Laughing Lady (1946)
- Northwest Outpost (1947)
- The Dancing Years (1950)
- Véronique (1950)
- Dance Into Happiness (1951)
- The Merry Farmer (1951)
- Andalusia (1951)
- Feather in the Wind (1952)
- Imperial Violets (1952)
- Voices of Spring (1952)
- The Land of Smiles (1952)
- The Beauty of Cadiz (1953)
- The Desert Song (1953)
- The Flower of Hawaii (1953)
- Rose Marie (1954)
- Victoria and Her Hussar (1954)
- Oklahoma! (1955)
- Four Days in Paris (1955)
- Leila and Gábor (1956)
- Opera Ball (1956)
- The King and I (1956)
- The Singer from Mexico (1957)
- The White Horse Inn (1960)
- The Bird Seller (1962)
- The Sound of Music (1965)
- The Mikado (1967)
- The Pirates of Penzance (1983)

== Bibliography ==
- Hardt, Usula (1996). 'From Caligari to California: Erich Pommer's Life in the International Film Wars. Berghahn Books.
- Phillips, Alastair (2004). City of Darkness, City of Light: Émigré Filmmakers in Paris, 1929–1939. Amsterdam University Press.
