= Lucie Dolène =

French actress and singer (1931–2020)

- Born: 17 June 1931; Damascus, Mandate for Syria and the Lebanon
- Died: 9 April 2020 (aged 88); Noisy-le-Grand, France
- Occupations: Actress; Singer

Lucie Dolène (17 June 1931 – 9 April 2020) was a French actress and singer. She notably dubbed the voices of Snow White and Mrs. Potts. Her autobiography, cowritten by Grégoire Philibert, was published in 2021.

== Biography ==
Dolène was born in Damascus during the French Mandate. Discovered by Joseph Canteloube, Dolène recorded Chants d'Auvergne under the pseudonym Lucie Daullène. She played in musicals with Luis Mariano and Les Frères Jacques.

Her skills in acting helped her find roles in theatrical productions, including Le noir te va si bien in 1975. She began dubbing in the 1950s, including her voice-over of Debbie Reynolds in the French film edition of Singin' in the Rain. Her soprano voice helped her voice-over in Snow White and the Seven Dwarfs, which was released in 1962. She voiced over Madame Samovar in Beauty and the Beast. When the movie was released on VHS, Dolène sued the Walt Disney Company over the rights to the use of her voice. She won the lawsuit, and Disney paid her for all the rights to her songs. Shortly thereafter, Disney opted for a different voice-over actress for all of its films and replaced Dolène's voice in Snow White. In 1997, Pierre Huyghe made a documentary on the suit, titled Blanche-Neige Lucie.

Dolène withdrew from studios in the 2010s. She died on 9 April 2020 in Noisy-le-Grand at the age of 88.

== Theatre ==
- Schnock (1952)
- Chevalier du Ciel (1955)
- La Belle Arabelle (1956)
- L'amour masqué (1970)
- Le noir te va si bien (1973–1974)
- Paris by Night (1982)
- Mother Courage and Her Children (1983)

== Filmography ==
=== Films ===
- Diesel (1985)

=== Television ===
==== Telefilms ====
- Il faut marier Maman (1957)
- Là-haut (1958)
- Le Sire de Vergy (1960)
- Un de la Canebière (1960)
- Au pays du soleil (1961)
- Monsieur Antoine (1961)
- Je connais une blonde (1963)
- Le Voleur de riens (1972)
- Le Tour du monde en 80 jours (1975)

==== Television series ====
- Rue de la Gaîté (1960)
- Au théâtre ce soir (1975)
- Vitamine (1983)

== Dubbing ==
=== Live action films ===
- Singin' in the Rain (1953)
- Frou-Frou (1955)
- How the West Was Won (1962)
- Oliver! (1968)
- The Christmas Tree (1969)
- Splash (1984)
- Apollo 13 (1995)
- Eight Crazy Nights (2002)
- Hot Fuzz (2007)
- The Other Guys (2010)
- You Will Meet a Tall Dark Stranger (2010)

=== Animated films ===
- Snow White and the Seven Dwarfs (1937, dubbing 1962)
- Hey There, It's Yogi Bear! (1964)
- The Man Called Flintstone (1966)
- The Jungle Book (1967)
- Tintin and the Temple of the Sun (1969)
- Aladdin and His Magic Lamp (1970)
- Charlotte's Web (1973)
- Pinocchio (1940, dubbing 1975)
- Las Aventuras de Oliver Twist (1986)
- Sparky's Magic Piano (1987)
- The Nutcracker Prince (1990)
- Beauty and the Beast (1991)
- Anastasia (1997)
- The Swan Princess: Escape from Castle Mountain (1997)
- Chicken Run (2001)
- The Land Before Time X: The Great Longneck Migration (2003)
- Piccolo, Saxo & Cie (2006)
- Open Season (2006)
- Open Season 2 (2008)
- Open Season 3 (2010)
- Tad, The Lost Explorer (2012)

=== Television ===
==== Telefilms ====
- The Thorn Birds: The Missing Years (1996)
- Alice in Wonderland (1999)

==== Television series ====
- The Bold and The Beautiful (1990–2006)
- Will & Grace (1999–2006)
- Sunset Beach (1999)
- The Middle (2009–2012)

==== Animated series ====
- Le Petit Lion (1967–1968)
- Hector's House (1968)
- Candy Candy (1976–1979)
- The Rose of Versailles (1979–1980)
- The Charlie Brown and Snoopy Show (1983–1985)
- The Story of Pollyanna, Girl of Love (1986)
- Maple Town (1986–1987)
- Katri, Girl of the Meadows (1987)
- Hello Kitty's Furry Tale Theater (1987)
- Reporter Blues (1991)
- Haikara-San: Here Comes Miss Modern (1995)
- Idol Densetsu Eriko (2000)

== Discography ==
- Chants d'Auverge (1950)
- The Land of Smiles (1957)

== Distinctions ==
- Knight of the Ordre des Arts et des Lettres (2017)
