= A Man's Past =

1927 film by George Melford

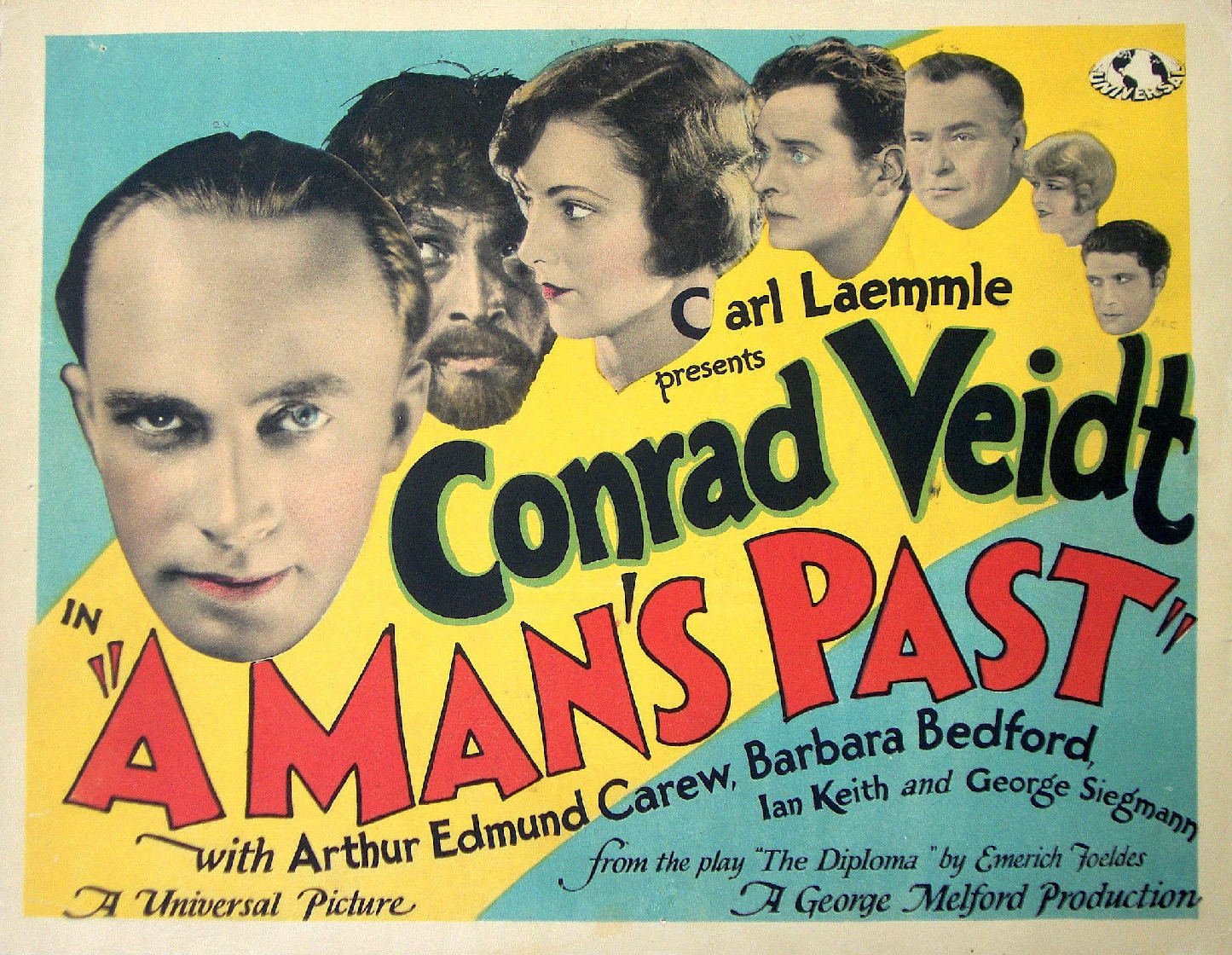
- Lobby card
- Directed by: George Melford
- Written by: Emil Forst; Paul Kohner; Tom Reed
- Based on: Diploma by: Imre Földes
- Produced by: Paul Kohner
- Starring: Conrad Veidt; Barbara Bedford; Ian Keith
- Cinematography: Gilbert Warrenton
- Production company: Universal Pictures
- Distributed by: Universal Pictures
- Release date: October 1, 1927
- Running time: 60 minutes
- Country: United States
- Language: Silent (English intertitles)

A Man's Past is a 1927 American silent drama film directed by George Melford and starring Conrad Veidt, Barbara Bedford, and Ian Keith.

== Cast ==
- Conrad Veidt as Paul La Roche
- Barbara Bedford as Yvonne Fontaine
- Ian Keith as Dr. Fontaine
- Arthur Edmund Carewe as Lieutenant Destin
- Charles Puffy as Prison Doctor
- Corliss Palmer as Sylvia Cabot
- Edward Reinach as Dr. Renaud
- Jean Girardin as Supporting Role (uncredited)

== Preservation ==
With no prints of A Man's Past located in any film archives, it is a lost film.

== Bibliography ==
- John T. Soister (2002). Conrad Veidt on Screen: A Comprehensive Illustrated Filmography. McFarland & Co. ISBN 978-0-7864-4511-0
