= Hella Kürty =

German actress (1900–1954)

- Born: 23 July 1900; German Empire
- Died: 7 November 1954 (aged 54); London, United Kingdom
- Occupations: Actress, singer
- Years active: 1927–1944 (film)

Hella Kürty (1900–1954) was a German actress and singer. An operetta performer, she originated the role of Mi in Franz Lehar's 1929 work The Land of Smiles alongside Richard Tauber. The following year she appeared in a film version of the operetta.

Of Jewish background, she was forced to emigrate from Germany following the Nazi takeover in 1933. She emigrated to Britain, settling in London.

== Selected filmography ==
- The Transformation of Dr. Bessel (1927)
- A Crazy Night (1927)
- A Day of Roses in August (1927)
- Diary of a Coquette (1929)
- The Land of Smiles (1930)
- Candlelight in Algeria (1944)
- Hotel Reserve (1944)

== Bibliography ==
- Bourne, Joyce (2008). A Dictionary of Opera Characters. Oxford: Oxford University Press. ISBN 978-0-19-955039-5.
