= Victoria and Her Hussar (1954 film) =

1954 film directed by Rudolf Schündler

- Directed by: Rudolf Schündler
- Written by: Egon Eis; Alfred Grünwald; Carl Heinz Jarosy; Fritz Löhner-Beda; Franz Marischka
- Based on: the operetta Viktoria und ihr Husar
- Produced by: Carl Heinz Járosy; Frank Clifford
- Starring: Eva Bartok; Friedrich Schoenfelder; Rudolf Forster; Grethe Weiser; Georg Thomalla
- Cinematography: Ernst W. Kalinke
- Edited by: Friedel Buckow
- Music by: Paul Abraham; Mischa Spoliansky
- Production companies: Allfram-Film; Sonor-Film
- Distributed by: Allianz Filmverleih
- Release date: 3 September 1954
- Running time: 91 minutes
- Country: West Germany
- Language: German

Victoria and Her Hussar (German: Viktoria und ihr Husar) is a 1954 West German musical film directed by Rudolf Schündler and starring Eva Bartok, Friedrich Schoenfelder and Rudolf Forster. Part of the tradition of operetta films, it is an adaptation of the 1930 operetta Viktoria und ihr Husar by Paul Abraham. A previous film adaptation Victoria and Her Hussar had already been produced in 1931 by Richard Oswald.

It was made at the Wandsbek Studios in Hamburg. The film's sets were designed by the art director Dieter Bartels and Felix Smetana.

== Partial cast ==
- Eva Bartok as Viktoria
- Friedrich Schoenfelder as Sandor Koltay
- Rudolf Forster as Fitzroy
- Grethe Weiser as Ursula Knepke
- Georg Thomalla as Janczi

== Bibliography ==
- Bock, Hans-Michael & Bergfelder, Tim. The Concise CineGraph. Encyclopedia of German Cinema. Berghahn Books, 2009.
