= The Flower of Hawaii =

1931 operetta in three acts by Paul Abraham

The Flower of Hawaii (German:Die Blume von Hawaii) is an operetta in three acts by Paul Abraham with a libretto by Alfred Grünwald, Fritz Löhner-Beda, and Imre Földes. It premiered on 24 July 1931 at the Neues Theater in Leipzig. The work was inspired by the story of Liliʻuokalani.

== Roles ==
- Laya, princess of Hawaii (soprano)
- Prince Lilo-Taro, betrothed to Laya (tenor)
- Kanako Hilo, a noble Hawaiian, leader of the royalist group (baritone)
- Reginald Harold Stone, captain in the US Marine (tenor)
- Lloyd Harrison, American governor of Hawaii (spoken)
- John Buffy, his secretary (buffo tenor)
- Bessi Worthington, the governor's niece (soubrette)
- Raka, a Hawaiian girl (Soubrette)
- Jim Boy, a black American jazz singer (buffo tenor)
- Suzanne Provence, Jim's partner (played by the role of Laya)
- Perroquet, head waiter
- Chun-chun, Chinese servant
- Admiral Makintosh (spoken)
- Kaluna, an old Hawaiian (baritone)
- Lieutenant Sunny Hill (any voice)
- Cadet Bobbie Flipps (any voice)
- Marine officers, cadets, Hawaiian dancers, Hawaiians, ladies and gentlemen of society, servants

== Plot ==
Place and time: Honolulu, Monte Carlo, some decades ago

=== Act 1 ===
In front of a villa in Honolulu

At the end of the 19th century, the US Army had occupied Hawaii and removed the Queen from power which is now held by the Governor. The Hawaiian princess Laya has resigned herself to these new circumstances and prefers to lives in Paris where her parents had sent her as a girl for her education. It was already arranged when she was a child that she would once marry Prince Lilo-Taro, but he prefers a life of travel over his home land.

Many natives resent the American occupation. The Royalist Party has elected Kanako Hilo as their leader and they hope he will succeed to break the colonial yoke. Governor Harrison plans to marry his niece Bessi to Lilo-Taro to gain influence over the Hawaiian leadership. However, Harrison's secretary, John Buffy, dislikes this plan because he is drawn to Bessi himself.

Captain Stone arrives in Honolulu. On board his ship are a pair of artists: the young man is the famous jazz singer Jim-Boy, and the lady accompanying him pretends to be the no less famous singer Susanne Provence. In fact, she is Princess Laya, intent to remain incognito for a while on her return home. During the journey, Captain Stone has fallen in love with the "singer".

When Kanako Hilo discovers the singer's true identity he hopes to win her as an ally in the battle against the occupiers. The Princess is not in favour of this idea, despite her being welcomed by the people as a Queen.

=== Act 2 ===
Hall of the Royal Palace in Honolulu

It is custom to elect a young lady as the Queen of the annual flower festival, her title: "Flower of Hawaii", and Princess Laya is to be this year's Queen. Governor Harris is concerned that the people will take this event as a trigger to revolt against the occupiers. He demands that Princess Laya sign a declaration in the name of the Hawaiian people to renounce all claims of sovereignty. When she refuses, the Governor declares her an enemy of the state and commands Captain Stone to arrest her. Filled with deep admiration for the Princess, he refuses, risking his job. To save him, Laya signs the declaration. Lilo-Taro -who by now has fiercely fallen in love with his arranged bride- misinterprets this gesture and flees in desperation to the ocean to kill himself. Now it is clear to Laya where her heart belongs.

=== Act 3 ===
A Chinese bar in Monte Carlo

Here, all those whose lives were connected in Hawaii meet again where the real Suzanne Provence performs. Stone and Lili-Taro have become friends since the captain saved the prince's life at the ocean. Witty and inventive, John Buffy manages to straighten out the relationships, winning Bessi for himself, and ensuring that Laya and Lilo-Taro find each other. Stone seeks consolation with Suzanne, Laya's look-alike, which is welcomed by Jim-Boy who brought the alluring Raka from Hawaii and didn't quite know how to tell his former lover Suzanne about his intentions - four happy couples.

== Notable arias ==
- Blume von Hawaii (Slow foxtrot)
- My golden baby (Foxtrot)
- Wo es Mädels gibt, Kameraden (March)
- My little Boy, ich bleib dir treu (Foxtrot)
- Lautlos glitt der Dampfer (Slow waltz duet)
- Will dir die Welt zu Füßen legen (Slow waltz)
- Bin nur ein Jonny, zieh durch die Welt (Slow foxtrot)
- Du traumschöne Perle der Südsee (Slow waltz)
- Ein Paradies am Meeresstrand (Slow foxtrot)
- Wir singen zur Jazzband (Foxtrot)

== Adaptations ==
- The Flower of Hawaii (1933 film), directed by Richard Oswald.
- The Flower of Hawaii (1953 film), directed by Géza von Cziffra.
- Die Blume von Hawaii (1971) at IMDb, directed by Manfred R. Köhler, television film shown on ZDF.
