= Ball at the Savoy (1935 film) =

- Directed by: Steve Sekely
- Written by: Alfred Grünwald (libretto); Fritz Löhner-Beda (libretto); Henry Koster; Géza von Cziffra
- Produced by: Ernő Gál
- Starring: Gitta Alpar; Hans Jaray; Rosy Barsony
- Cinematography: István Eiben
- Edited by: Ladislao Vajda
- Music by: Paul Abraham
- Production company: City-Film
- Release date: 1 February 1935
- Running time: 88 minutes
- Countries: Austria; Hungary
- Language: German

Ball at the Savoy (German: Ball im Savoy) is a 1935 Austrian-Hungarian musical film directed by Steve Sekely and starring Gitta Alpar, Hans Jaray and Rosy Barsony. Part of the tradition of operetta films, it is based on the 1932 work of the same title by Paul Abraham. It was remade the following year in Britain.

The film's sets were designed by the art director Marton Vincze. The film was shot at the Hunnia Film Studios in Budapest.

== Cast ==
- Gitta Alpar as Anita Helling
- Hans Jaray as Baron André v. Wollheim
- Rosy Barsony as Mary v. Wollheim
- Willy Stettner as Der Zimmerkellner Jean
- Felix Bressart as Birowitsch, der Sekretär
- Otto Wallburg as Der Verleger Haller
- Hermann Blaß as Der Direktor im Grand Hotel
- Emmi Buttykay as Szobalány
- Harry Csáktornyai as Táncoló statiszta
- Oszkár Dénes as Sänger
- Edit Kállay as Pofozkodó lány
- László Keleti
- Lili Székely

== Bibliography ==
- Robert Von Dassanowsky. Austrian Cinema: A History. McFarland, 2005.
