= Ball im Savoy =

Jazz operetta

Ball im Savoy (Ball at the Savoy) is a jazz operetta in three acts and a prelude by Paul Abraham to a libretto by Alfred Grünwald and Fritz Löhner-Beda.

It premiered on 23 December 1932 at the Großes Schauspielhaus, Berlin. However, Hitler became Chancellor five weeks later, and because composer and librettists were all Jewish, the show was forced to close down (despite its critical and popular acclaim) on 2 April, 1933. It was revived on 9 September 1933 at the New German Theatre in Prague under music director George Szell.

The English-language premiere was on 8 September 1933 at the Drury Lane Theatre, London, under the title Ball at the Savoy, with the libretto adapted by Oscar Hammerstein. This was Abraham's last major success.

Although Ball im Savoy is a relatively recent operetta, its characters follow the classic scheme: Aristide (tenor) is a rueful rake, excruciated by the possible betrayal. Madeleine (soprano) is a more modern person, ready to give as good as she gets, albeit plagued by scruples: a feminist before the term existed, who receives approval from the other women. Mustafa represents the stock comic. More interesting is Daisy (soubrette): sly, brave, she knows what she wants and how to get it.

== The music ==
The score is more modern than the libretto, using an abundance of foxtrots and Latin American dances like tango and pasodoble. However, it also features the waltz in its classic shape, known as the "English Waltz". Sometimes—for example in the overture—Abraham inserts some more refined harmonic development, but only in sporadic flashes. His primary aim was, as he himself declared, to search for success, one eye to Broadway theatre and the other to the cinema.

== Roles ==
Roles, voice types, premiere cast
Role	Voice type	Premiere cast, 23 December 1932 Conductor: Paul Abraham
Madeleine de Faublas (or Faublais)	soprano	Gitta Alpár
Marquis Aristide de Faublas, her husband	tenor	Arthur Schröder
Daisy Darlington (Parker) (José Pasodoble), jazz composer	soprano	Rosy Barsony
Mustapha Bey, Turkish embassy attaché	tenor	Oszkár Dénes
Tangolita. Argentine dancer	contralto	Trude Berliner
Archibald, Aristide's servant	baritone	
Mizzi from Vienna, divorced wife of Mustapha Bey	spoken	
Blanca from Prague, divorced wife of Mustapha Bey	spoken	
Lucia from Rome, divorced wife of Mustapha Bey	spoken	
Mercedes from Madrid, divorced wife of Mustapha Bey	spoken	
Trude from Berlin, divorced wife of Mustapha Bey	spoken	
Ilonka from Budapest, divorced wife of Mustapha Bey	spoken	
Célestin Formant, lawyer	spoken	Viktor de Kowa
Pomerol, headwaiter at the Savoy	spoken	
Monsieur Albert, head of a fashion house in Paris	spoken	
Ernest Bennuet, a young friend of Célestin	spoken	
Bébé, Madeleine's maid	spoken	
Guests at Faublas's, hotel guests and staff, ball guests, dancers

== Synopsis ==
Place and time: Venice, Nice, Paris; 1932

=== Prelude ===
Venice, palaces at the Grand Canal of Venice

=== Act 1 ===
Hall in a villa in Nice

The Marquis Aristide de Faublas and his wife Madeleine celebrate the return from their lengthy honeymoon in their villa in Nice, when a telegram from the dancer Tangolita arrives. In Aristide's turbulent past, he had promised her an intimate supper on a night of her choosing. Now she wants him to take her tonight to the annual Grand Ball at the Hotel Savoy. With the help of Mustafa Bey, Aristide persuades his wife that he has to go to the Savoy to meet the famous jazz musician José Pasodoble and that Madeleine can not go because the suitcase with her ball gown has not arrived. But Pasodoble is the pseudonym of Madeleine's American cousin, Daisy, so Madeleine now knows she is to be deceived.

=== Act 2 ===
Foyer to the Ballroom of the Savoy in Paris

While Aristide meets his old friends from his bachelor days, Madeleine wants revenge. Hiding her face behind a veil, she flirts with Célestin Formant, a timid young man who hopes for the adventure of his life. Meanwhile, Mustafa is enchanted by Daisy.

Aristide and Tangolita withdraw for supper to a private dining room at the hotel, as do Madeleine and the courting Célestin. During dinner, Aristide asks for the telephone in order to call his wife, but the waiter Pomerol, accustomed to these situations, diverts the line to Madeleine's dining room, so that she can answer, pretending to be at home. Deeply disappointed, Madeleine decides to succumb to Célestin. While José Pasodoble receives praise from the Savoy Hotel and reveals her true identity, Madeleine announces publicly to have betrayed her husband.

=== Act 3 ===
Hall in a villa in Nice

Madeleine's revenge receives general approval, while Aristide gets enraged in doubt: did she or did she not? Since Madeleine continues to confirm the betrayal, the Marquis calls a lawyer in order to start divorce proceedings. The lawyer arrives: it is Célestin Formant, but even from him Aristide cannot discover whether the betrayal took place. Mustafa proposes marriage to Daisy —and this time for life— but only if Aristide and Madeleine get reconciled, so Daisy reveals the truth to Aristide, and the couple gets re-united.

== Notable arias ==
- "Bist du mir treu?"
- "Es ist so schön, am Abend bummeln zu geh'n"
- "Tangolita"
- "Toujours l'amour"
- "Wenn wir Türken küssen"

== Movie/TV adaptations ==
- Ball at the Savoy, a 1935 Austrian-Hungarian film adaptation directed by Steve Sekely
- Ball at Savoy, a 1936 British film adaptation directed by Victor Hanbury
- Ball at the Savoy, a 1955 West German film adaptation directed by Paul Martin
