= Viktoria und ihr Husar =

Operetta in three acts and a prelude by Paul Abraham

Viktoria und ihr Husar (Victoria and Her Hussar) is an operetta in three acts and a prelude by Paul Abraham with a libretto by Alfred Grünwald and Fritz Löhner-Beda, based on a work by the Hungarian playwright Imre Földes. It premiered under the baton of the composer on 21 February 1930 in Budapest. The German premiere was on 7 July 1930 in Leipzig, and it was then given on 23 December 1930 at the Theater an der Wien, Vienna. An adaptation into English by Harry Graham was performed at the Palace Theatre, London, on 17 September 1931.

== Roles ==
Roles, voice types, premier cast
Role	Voice type	Premiere cast, 21 February 1930 Conductor: Paul Abraham
John Cunlight, American legate	bass	
Countess Viktoria, his wife	soprano	Lizzi Waldmüller
Count Ferry Hegedüs of Dorozsma, her brother	tenor	
O Lia San, Ferry's bride	soprano (soubrette)	
Riquette, Viktoria's chamber maid	soubrette	
Stefan Koltay, Hussar Cavalry Master	tenor	
Jancsi, his batman	tenor	
Béla Pörkölty, mayor of Dorozsma	baritone	
A Japanese priest	baritone	
Tokeramo Yagani, Japanese attaché	spoken	
A Russian officer	spoken	
A Japanese footman	spoken	
Japanese cavaliers and girls, guests, servants, chamber maids, coolies, Cossacks, Hussars.

== Synopsis ==
=== Time and place ===
The operetta takes place after the end of the first world war in a Russian prison camp in Siberia, as well as in the cities Tokyo (Japan), St. Petersburg (Russia) and the Hungarian village Dorozsma near Szeged.

=== Prelude ===
Stefan Koltay, Cavalry Master of the Husars, and his batman Jancsi have become prisoners of war to the Russians. Because they both joined with a group that planned a counter-revolution, and was revealed, they have been sentenced to death and are now awaiting their execution. Jancsi plays a sorrowful Hungarian melody on his violin one last time. The melody speaks so to the Cossack guard that he promises the two Hungarians that he will release them, if only he can receive the violin in exchange for their freedom. Stefan Koltay and Jancsi do not have to consider long, and after they have given the violin to the Cossack, they both leave the prison camp immediately and escape towards Japan.

=== Act 1 ===
The wife of the American ambassador John Cunlight, the countess Viktoria, used to be engaged to the Cavalry Master Stefan Koltay. She waited for him a long time after the war was over. Only after she received the message that he had fallen, did she slowly let herself be convinced by John Cunlight, to finally marry him.

Stefan Koltay has heard that there are, in the US embassy in Tokyo, some fellow countrymen awaiting a passage to Hungary. He goes there with the intention of joining them, and so meet his beloved Viktoria after years apart. She introduces him to her husband under a pseudonym. Koltay also learns that the ambassador has been transferred to St. Petersburg and that the journey from Tokyo will take place in a few days. Further, Viktoria's brother, Count Ferry, and his fiancée, the Japanese O Lia San, are about to journey on. John Cunlght has no idea of the past that connects his wife with the newly arrived Hungarian, and invited Stefan Koltay and his friend Jancsi to travel with them, under diplomatic protection. From St. Petersburg they will then surely find an opportunity to safely travel on to Hungary. Jancsi is overjoyed, since he immediately fell in love with Viktoria's pretty chamber maid, Riquette, and now sees the opportunity to stay close to her.

=== Act 2 ===
As Stefan Koltay and Viktoria are alone for a moment, they take the chance to speak openly to each other. Viktoria explains how she came to marry John Cunlight and Stefan attempts to convince Viktoria to flee to Hungary with him. She is however determined to honor her marriage with John Cunlight.

The Russian secret service has found out that a person once sentenced to death in a Siberian prison camp, namely Stefan Koltay, is residing in the US embassy under false name. Through their influence, John Cunlight receives the order from the Russian government to deliver the Hungarians to them. As he holds the papers in his hand, it becomes obvious to John Cunlight that his wife has had previous a relationship with Stefan Koltay, but despite this, he refuses the Russian orders. However, because Stefan Koltay believes that Viktoria's love to him has died, he voluntarily hands himself over to the Russians. As Viktoria learns of this, she breaks down in tears. It now becomes obvious to John Cunlight that the true love of his wife does not belong to him, but still burns for the Hungarian Cavalry Master.

=== Act 3 ===
Viktoria has in the time passed separated from her husband and, after a long journey around the world, has returned to her ancestral village. Here she meets again with her brother Ferry and her former chamber maid Riquette. The traditional wine harvest festival is currently being celebrated. Because old customs demand that three couples are married during the festival, both Ferry and O Lia San as well as Riquette and Jancsi are planning to marry. They are only missing a third couple. Ferry now suggests that John Cunlight can join them. He has become ambassador in Hungary and the capital is not far away. In this way, Viktoria can marry John a second time, since their separation was a hasty move which it is best to repair quickly.

When John Cunlight arrives, Viktoria is ready to give it a second try with him. However, to her great surprise her beloved Hussar turns up again. As she now sees that John does not even become upset, but only gently smiles, she realizes the truth: Her former husband has arranged everything. His love to her is so great, that he willingly did everything to cause her joy, even if it means leaving her.

As the old customs traditions demand, the three happy couples can say yes to each other.

== Orchestra ==
One flute, one oboe, two clarinets, one bassoon, two horns, two trumpets, three trombones, one harp, one tuba, one celesta, one lap steel guitar, percussion and strings.

=== Notable arias ===
- Nur ein Mädel gibt es auf der Welt
- Ja so ein Mädel, ungarisches Mädel
- An der Newa steh ein Haus
- Pardon, Madame, ich bin verliebt
- Ungarland, Donauland (or Ungarland, Heimatland)
- Meine Mama war aus Yokohama, aus Paris ist der Papa
- Mausi, süß warst du heute Nacht
- Reich mir zum Abschied noch einmal die Hände

== Film adaptations ==
- Victoria and Her Hussar (1931 film) directed by Richard Oswald
- Victoria and Her Hussar (1954 film) directed by Rudolf Schündler

== Recordings ==
- Abraham: Viktoria und ihr Husar – Blume von Hawaii (Querschnitt), Eurodisc, (excerpts, with Rudolf Schock)
