= Ludwig Herzer =

Austrian musician, physician and librettist

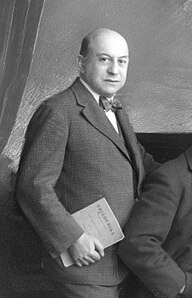
- Ludwig Herzer in the 1920s
- Born: Ludwig Herzl; 18 March 1872; Vienna, Austria-Hungary
- Died: 17 April 1939 (aged 67); St. Gallen, Switzerland
- Occupations: Librettist, writer, physician
- Writing career
- Language: German

Ludwig Herzer, born Ludwig Herzl, (born 18 March 1872 in Vienna, Austria-Hungary, died 17 April 1939 in St. Gallen, Switzerland) was an Austrian physician and librettist.

== Life ==
Ludwig Herzl, later better known under his pseudonym Ludwig Herzer, was born on 18 March 1872 in Vienna, at the time part of the Austrian-Hungarian Empire. There he studied medicine at the University of Vienna and worked as a gynecologist as his main profession. He also wrote operetta librettos, often in collaboration with other well-known librettists such as Alfred Grünwald or Fritz Löhner, for Edmund Eysler, Franz Lehár and Robert Stolz, among others.

After the annexation of Austria by Nazi Germany, he was forced to flee as a Jew. With great difficulty he was able to reach Swiss territory near Hohenems-Diepoldsau on 29 November 1938.

Herzer died on 17 April 1939 in St. Gallen, Switzerland.

== Works ==
=== Librettos ===
- Gräfin Fifi. Operette in drei Akten (nach dem Französischen von Emile de Najac, Alfred Hennequin und Albert Millaud) von Oskar Friedmann und Ludwig Herzer, Musik von Albert Chantrier; 1913
- Das Zimmer der Pompadour. Operette in einem Akt von Oskar Friedmann und Ludwig Herzer, Musik von Edmund Eysler; 1915
- Die goldene Tochter. Operette in drei Akten von Oscar Friedmann und Ludwig Herzer, Musik von Max Milian; 1916
- Der Aushilfsgatte. Operette in drei Akten von Oscar Friedmann und Ludwig Herzer, Musik von Edmund Eysler; 1917
- Der dunkle Schatz. Operette in drei Akten von Oscar Friedmann und Ludwig Herzer, Musik von Edmund Eysler; 1918
- Die Siegerin. Von Oskar Friedmann und Ludwig Herzer verfasstes Libretto zu einer unvertont gebliebenen Operette von Leo Fall; um 1920
- Hallo Tommy!. Operette in drei Akten von Ludwig Herzer, Musik von George Edwards; um 1925
- Lady X.... Operette in drei Akten von Ludwig Herzer, Musik von George Edwards; 1927
- Cagliostro in Wien. Operette in drei Akten von F. Zell und Richard Genée. Musik von Johann Strauss (Sohn). Für die Bühne neu eingerichtet mit dem Text von Ludwig Herzer, Musik von Erich Wolfgang Korngold; 1927.
- Friederike. Singspiel in drei Akten von Ludwig Herzer und Fritz Löhner, Musik von Franz Lehár; 1928
- Das Land des Lächelns. Romantische Operette in drei Akten nach Victor Léon von Ludwig Herzer und Fritz Löhner, Musik von Franz Lehár, 1929
- Schön ist die Welt. Operette in drei Akten von Ludwig Herzer und Fritz Löhner, Musik von Franz Lehár; 1930
- Das Lied des Liebe. Operette in drei Akten von Ludwig Herzer, Musik nach Johann Strauss (Sohn) in der Bearbeitung von Erich Wolfgang Korngold; 1931
- Katharina. Eine russische Ballade in neun Bildern von Ludwig Herzer und Ernst Steffan, Gesangstexte von Fritz Löhner, Musik von Ernst Steffan; 1932
- Venus in Seide. Operette in drei Akten von Alfred Grünwald und Ludwig Herzer, Musik von Robert Stolz; 1932
- Der Prinz von Schiras. Operette in drei Akten (fünf Bildern) von Ludwig Herzer und Fritz Löhner, Musik von Joseph Beer; 1934.
- Eva im Pelz. Musikalische Komödie in drei Akten von Ludwig Herzer, Musik von Michael Krasznay-Krausz; 1935
- Verzeih', daß ich Dich lieb’ … Musikalisches Lustspiel in drei Akten (nach einer Idee von Gregor Schmitt) von George Marton und Ludwig Herzer, Gesangstexte von Karl Farkas, Musik von Michael Krazsnay-Krausz; 1937

=== Stage works ===
- Morphium. Ein Notturno in 4 Teilen. Mit einem Geleitwort von Julius Wagner-Jauregg. Paul Knepler, Wien 1921. Dieses Werk wurde auch am Broadway (Eltinge 42nd Street Theatre) von März bis Mai 1923 64 Mal aufgeführt
- Brautnacht. Komödie in drei Akten, gemeinsam mit Rudolph Lothar. Drei Masken Verlag, Berlin 1932 (als unverkäufliches Bühnenmanuskript gedruckt).

== Literature ==
- Harry Zohn: Ich bin ein Sohn der deutschen Sprache nur. Jüdisches Erbe in der österreichischen Literatur. Amalthea, Wien 1986, S. 225, ISBN 3-85002-210-2.
- Felix Czeike: Historisches Lexikon Wien. Band 3. Kremayr & Scheriau, Wien 1994, S. 382, ISBN 3-218-00547-7.

(here obviously erroneous entry as “Ludwig Herzek”)
