= Paul Abraham =

Jewish-Hungarian composer (1892–1960)

External audio
- Shellac recordings with Paul Abraham in the Online Archive of the Österreichische Mediathek

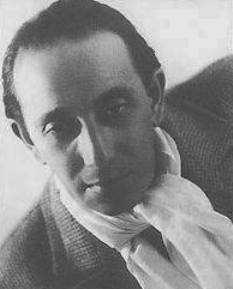
Paul Abraham (circa 1931)

Paul Abraham (Hungarian: Ábrahám Pál; 2 November 1892 – 6 May 1960) was a Jewish-Hungarian composer of operettas, who scored major successes in the German-speaking world. His specialty – and own innovation – was the insertion of jazz interludes into operettas.

Abraham was born in Apatin, Austria-Hungary (today Serbia), and studied at the Royal National Hungarian Academy of Music in Budapest from 1910 to 1916. He studied cello with Adolf Schiffer and composition with Viktor Herzfeld.

== Career ==
Abraham was a son of Jakab Ábrahám (c. 1859–1909) – who was a merchant from Apatin, later head of a small private bank – and Flóra Blau (1872–1943), who came from Mohács (South-Hungary, next to Danube). Like many other composers of operettas, Abraham started with works of a serious nature. During the decade following his studies he wrote, among other things, sacred music, string quartets and a concerto for violoncello. When he was appointed conductor at the Budapest Operetta Theatre in 1927 he found his way to this more popular art form which was more suited to his talent.

He wrote his first operetta, Der Gatte des Fräuleins, in 1928. With his third, Viktoria und ihr Husar (1930), he achieved a resounding success. Through this work, and the next two operettas from 1931 and 1933 Die Blume von Hawaii (The Flower of Hawaii) and Ball im Savoy he became renowned worldwide. He also wrote numerous film scores.

The Nazi seizure of power in 1933 forced Abraham to abandon his domicile in Berlin and leave Germany. He was unwanted both as a Jew, and as the author of Die Blume von Hawaii, considered a piece of "degenerate art" by the Nazis, telling the story of a German sailor who falls in love with a Hawaiian girl.

Via Vienna and Paris he moved to Cuba where he earned a modest living as a pianist and later emigrated to New York City. After a mental breakdown he was in February 1946 committed to the Bellevue Hospital in Manhattan, later to the Creedmoor Psychiatric Center in Queens. In May 1956 he returned to live in Hamburg, Germany, where he received treatment at the University Medical Center Hamburg-Eppendorf. He died four years later, aged 67.

== Selected filmography ==
- The Singing City (1930)
- The Private Secretary (1931)
- Sunshine Susie (1931)
- City of Song (1931)
- Victoria and Her Hussar (1931)
- The Blue of Heaven (1932)
- Gypsies of the Night (1932)
- Overnight Sensation (1932)
- A Bit of Love / Monsieur, Madame and Bibi (1932)
- The Rakoczi March (1933)
- Purple Lilacs (1934)
- The Typist Gets Married (1934)
- Temptation (1934)
- Antonia (1935)
- Ball at the Savoy (1935)
- Modern Girls (1937)
- Viki (1937)
- Tales of Budapest (1937)
- Family Bonus (1937)
- Hotel Springtime (1937)
- The Wrong Man (1938)
- Roxy and the Wonderteam (1938)
- Serenade (1940)
- The Private Secretary (1953)
- Ball at the Savoy (1955)

== Works ==
- Zenebona (together with other composers), operette in 3 acts, 2 March 1928, Budapest, libretto: László Lakatos and István Bródy
- Az utolsó Verebély lány, operette, 3 acts (also known as Az elsö Verebély lány or Der Gatte des Fräuleins) 13 October 1928, libretto: Imre Harmath and Gábor Drégely
- Szeretem a felségem (Es geschehen noch Wunder), Magyar Színház 15 June 1929, libretto: André Birabeau and Georges Dolley (after: Stella Adorján)
- Viktoria und ihr Husar (Victoria and her Hussar), operette, 3 acts and prologue. 21 February 1930 Budapest, Operettentheater, libretto: Imre Földes and Imre Harmath (German: Alfred Grünwald and Fritz Löhner-Beda)
- Die Blume von Hawaii (The Flower of Hawaii), operette 3 acts, 24 July 1931 Leipzig, Neues Theater, libretto: Alfred Grünwald and Fritz Löhner-Beda, after Imre Földes
- Ball im Savoy, operette in 3 acts and prologue. 23 December 1932 Berlin, Großes Schauspielhaus, libretto: Alfred Grünwald and Fritz Löhner-Beda. English: Ball at The Savoy, 8 September 1933 London, Drury Lane Theatre
- Märchen im Grand-Hotel, Lustspieloperette 3 acts 29 March 1934 Vienna, Theater an der Wien, libretto: Alfred Grünwald and Fritz Löhner-Beda
- Viki, music comedy in 3 acts, 26 January 1935 Magyar Színház, libretto: Imre Harmath and Adorján Bónyi
- Történnek még csodák, music comedy in 3 acts 20 April 1935 Magyar Színház, libretto: Imre Halász and István Békeffy
- Dschainah, das Mädchen aus dem Tanzhaus, operette 3 acts, 21 December 1935 Vienna, Theater an der Wien, libretto: Alfred Grünwald and Fritz Löhner-Beda
- 3:1 a szerelem javára, operette in 2 acts. 18 December 1936 Király Színház, libretto: Imre Harmath, Dezső Kellér and László Szilágyi
- Roxy und ihr Wunderteam, Musikalischer Fußballschwank, 25 March 1937 Vienna, Theater an der Wien, libretto: Hans Weigel and Alfred Grünwald
- Julia, operette in 2 parts and a Nachspiel, 23 December 1937 Városi Színház Budapest, libretto: Imre Harmath and Imre Földes
- A Fehér hattyu, operette 3 acts (The White Swan), 1938
- Zwei glückliche Herzen, libretto: Robert Gilbert and Armin L. Robinson; premiere date unknown
- Tambourin, musical in 2 parts (unperformed) Libretto: Alfred Grünwald
