= The Last Waltz (disambiguation) =

The Last Waltz is the 1976 final concert by The Band and a 1978 film documenting the concert.

The Last Waltz or Last Waltz may also refer to:

== Music ==
- The Last Waltz (operetta) (Der letzte Walzer), a Viennese operetta by Oscar Straus 1920

=== Albums ===
- The Last Waltz (1978 album), a three-LP soundtrack album from the film
- The Last Waltz: The Final Recordings, a 2000 box set by Bill Evans with Marc Johnson and Joe LaBarbera
- The Last Waltz, a 1967 album by Engelbert Humperdinck
- The Last Waltz, a 1990 album by Daniel O'Donnell
- The Last Waltz, a 1997 album by Killdozer

=== Songs ===
- "The Last Waltz" (song), by Engelbert Humperdinck, 1967
- "The Last Waltz", by Rodney Crowell from Diamonds & Dirt, 1988
- "The Last Waltz", by Webb Pierce, 1953
- “The Last Waltz”, by The Beautiful South from Gaze, 2003
- "Last Waltz", by the Rasmus from Into, 2001
- "Last Waltz", by Twice from Formula of Love: O+T=＜3, 2021

== Film and television ==
=== Film ===
- The Last Waltz (1927 film), a German silent film directed by Arthur Robison, based on Oscar Straus' operetta
- The Last Waltz (1934 film), a German operetta film directed by Georg Jacoby, based on Oscar Straus' operetta
- The Last Waltz (1936 French film), a French-language operetta film directed by Leo Mittler, based on Oscar Straus' operetta
- The Last Waltz (1936 British film), the English-language version of the French film, also directed by Leo Mittler
- The Last Waltz (1953 film), a German operetta film directed by Arthur Maria Rabenalt, based on Oscar Straus' operetta

=== Television ===
- "The Last Waltz", 2007 series episode, see list of Californication episodes
- "The Last Waltz", 2005 series episode from The O.C. season 3
- "Last Waltz", 2018 series episode of Runaways
