= The Last Waltz (1934 film) =

1934 film

- German: Der letzte Walzer
- Directed by: Georg Jacoby
- Written by: Julius Brammer (libretto); Alfred Grünwald (libretto); Max Wallner; Georg Weber
- Starring: Ernst Dumcke; Max Gülstorff; Iván Petrovich
- Cinematography: Carl Drews
- Music by: Oscar Straus (operetta); Paul Hühn
- Production company: Gnom-Tonfilm
- Release date: 27 November 1934
- Running time: 95 minutes
- Country: Germany
- Language: German

The Last Waltz (German: Der letzte Walzer) is a 1934 German operetta film directed by Georg Jacoby, and starring Ernst Dumcke, Max Gülstorff, and Iván Petrovich. It is based on the 1920 operetta The Last Waltz by Oscar Straus. It was remade in English in 1936.

== Cast ==
- Ernst Dumcke as Großfürst Paul Iwanowitsch
- Max Gülstorff as Tatarski, erster Adjutant
- Iván Petrovich as Oberleutnant Graf Dimitrij Sarrasow
- Tibor Halmay as Viktor Röder, Austian Gesandtschaft
- Eduard von Winterstein as General Dymoff
- Walter Steinbeck as General Putiloff
- Adele Sandrock as Frau von Damaskin
- Camilla Horn as Vera, ihre Nichte
- Mara Jakisch as Saschinka, ihre Nichte
- Maja Feist as Daschinka, ihre Nichte
- Susi Lanner as Katinka, ihre Nichte
- Hans Junkermann as Alte Exzellenz von Damaskin
- Martha von Konssatzki as Mutter Petrowana
- Karl Platen as Grischa, Diener
- Walter Stein
- Helmuth Rudolph
- Arthur Reinhardt
- Charlotte Hasse
- Sigrid Kara
- Hellmuth Passarge as Ein Wachtmeister
- C. M. Richter
- Hans Ritter
- Viktor Senger
- Carl Wilhelm Tetting
- Hans von Zedlitz
- Ballett der Städtischen Oper Berlin

== See also ==
- The Last Waltz (1927)
- The Last Waltz (UK, 1936)
- The Last Waltz (France, 1936)
- The Last Waltz (1953)
