= The Last Waltz (1927 film) =

1927 film directed by Arthur Robison

- American poster
- Directed by: Arthur Robison
- Written by: Oscar Straus (operetta); Julius Brammer (operetta); Alfred Grünwald (operetta); Alice Miller; Arthur Robison
- Produced by: Charles E. Whittaker
- Starring: Liane Haid; Willy Fritsch; Suzy Vernon; Fritz Rasp
- Cinematography: Joe Rive; Theodor Sparkuhl
- Music by: Werner R. Heymann
- Production company: UFA
- Distributed by: UFA
- Release date: 19 August 1927
- Running time: 117 minutes
- Country: Weimar Republic
- Languages: Silent; German intertitles

The Last Waltz (German: Der letzte Walzer) is a 1927 German silent romance film directed by Arthur Robison and starring Liane Haid, Willy Fritsch and Suzy Vernon. It was based on the 1920 operetta Der letzte Walzer by Oscar Straus.

== Cast ==
- Liane Haid as Prinzessin Elena
- Willy Fritsch as Graf Dimitri Sarrasow, Hauptmann
- Suzy Vernon as Gräfin Vera
- Fritz Rasp as Linnsky, Hofmarschall
- Hans Adalbert Schlettow as Kronprinz Alexis
- Sophie Pagay as Die Königin
- Ida Wüst as Eine Hofdame
- Elsie Vanya as Das Stubenmädchen
- Fritz Eckert
- John Loder

== See also ==
- The Last Waltz (1934)
- The Last Waltz (UK, 1936)
- The Last Waltz (France, 1936)
- The Last Waltz (1953)

== Bibliography ==
- Bergfelder, Tim & Bock, Hans-Michael. The Concise Cinegraph: Encyclopedia of German. Berghahn Books, 2009.
