= Harmoneon =

French free-reed musical instrument

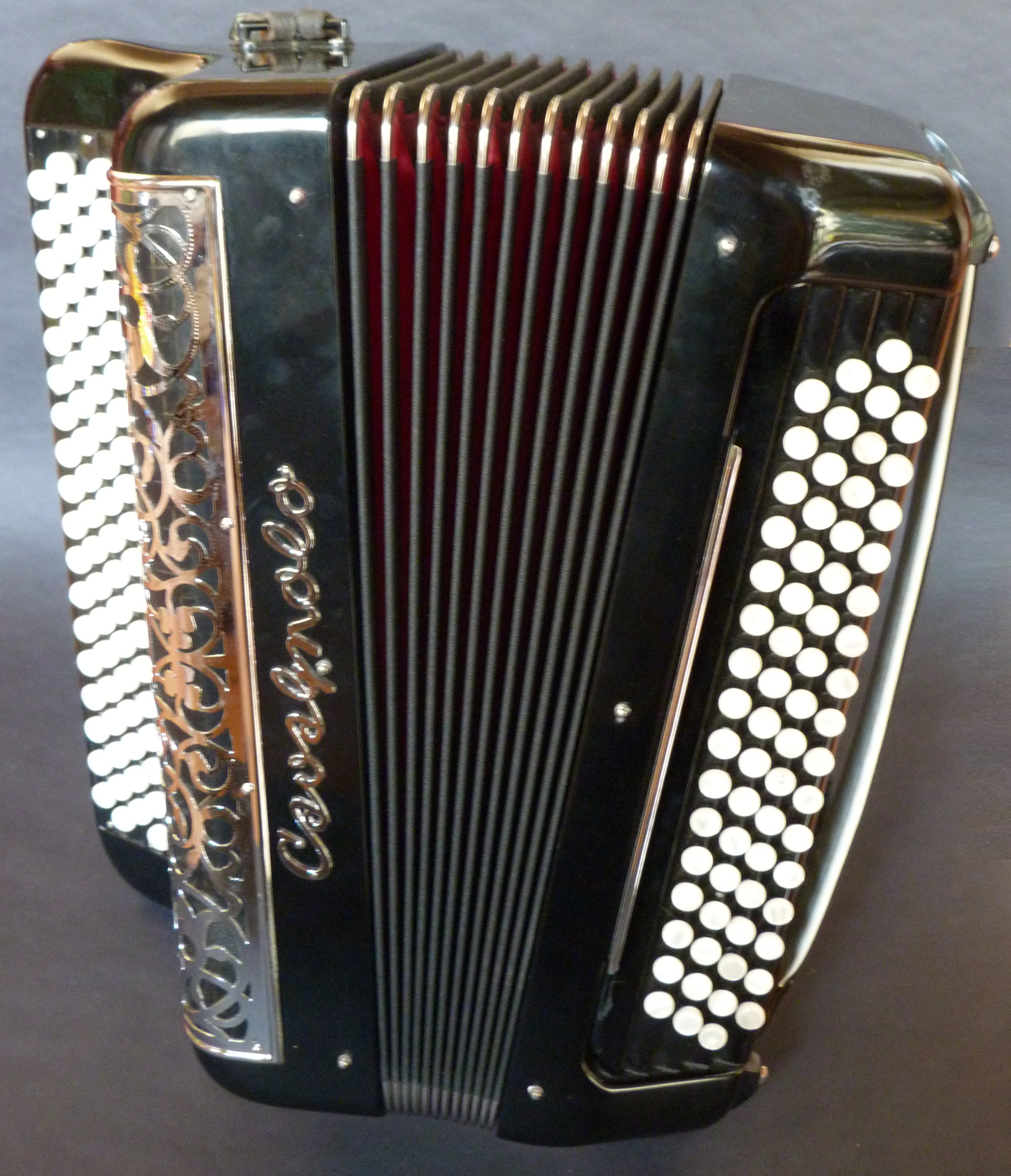
- A Harmoneon by the Italian manufacturer Cavagnolo, manufactured in 1985.

Other instrument
- Hornbostel–Sachs classification: 412.132 (Free-reed aerophone)
- Inventor(s): Pierre Monichon
- Developed: 1948

Related instruments
- Accordion, Duet concertina, melodeon

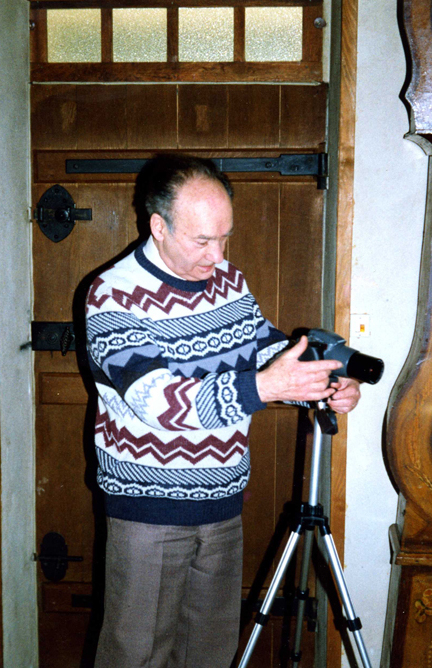
Pierre Monichon in 2004.

The Harmoneon or concert accordion (French: Harmonéon, accordeon de concert) is a French free reed aerophone, invented by Pierre Monichon in 1948, although he only patented the instrument four years later in 1952. It has been taught in musical conservatories since 1974. The instrument has great similarity to both the duet concertina and button accordion.

== Background ==
As a young accordion teacher, the initial motivation of Pierre Monichon was to create his own fully fledged concert instrument, to be included in the same brigade of so-called "noble instruments"; the piano, the violin and so forth. Unbeknownst to Monichon, this idea was far from original. The local factory had been creating accordions with symmetrical keyboards, which was a first step towards the creation of the Harmoneon. The instrument was designed to be played with symphony orchestra.

== Keyboard System ==
The Stradella bass system had long been controversial in the accordion world, as it was dissatisfactory to many accordionists. This was for several reasons, mostly in that it restricted classical repertoire, and that it was not very ergonomical. Many other bassboard configurations had been tested, such as the 'bassette' system.

Monichon proposed a new keyboard system, which eliminated prepared chords, with the aim to lighten the instrument's left hand, creating a more homogenous timbre between the two keyboards. The new layout had the same fingering as the right hand, and was more ergonomic. A new system of keyboard layout had to be created, identical to the keyboard in the right hand, which allowed for Fortunately, this system had already been created for instruments such as the Bayan, in the beginning of the 20th century,

The first harmoneon prototype by Giovanni Segalla were created in Paris in 1948. Segalla was the brother-in-law of Bortolo Busato, an Italian luthier specialising in guitars who later created many Harmoneons. Busato made these instruments as a favour to Monichon, who was the accordion teacher of his two daughters. Later on, harmoneons were added to the catalogues of accordion producers such as Bonifassi, Atelier, Cavagnolo, and Maugein. The instrument was played primarily in France, the Netherlands and in Germany. However, interest in the Harmoneon has been renewed in recent years.

== Support ==
Numerous French composers wrote for the Harmoneon, particularly Alain Abbot.

The first concert for the Harmonéon was performed by Monique Lecoq-Taupin, another student of Monichon's, in 1949. She performed The Marriage of Figaro, by Mozart. In 1956 she formed the first Harmoneon duo with her husband, Charles Taupin, another student of Monichon.

A Harmonean course is taught to this day at the Conservatoire de Paris. The course was originally formed in 1968, taught bt Monichon and Taupin. As of 2022, it is taught by Frédéric Guérouet.
