= Schalmei =

Schalmei may refer to:

- Shawm, a double reeded woodwind instrument from the Renaissance period
  - Hirtenschalmei
- Martinshorn, a free reed instrument invented by Max Martin in 1880
