= Free reed aerophone =

Class of wind instrument for music

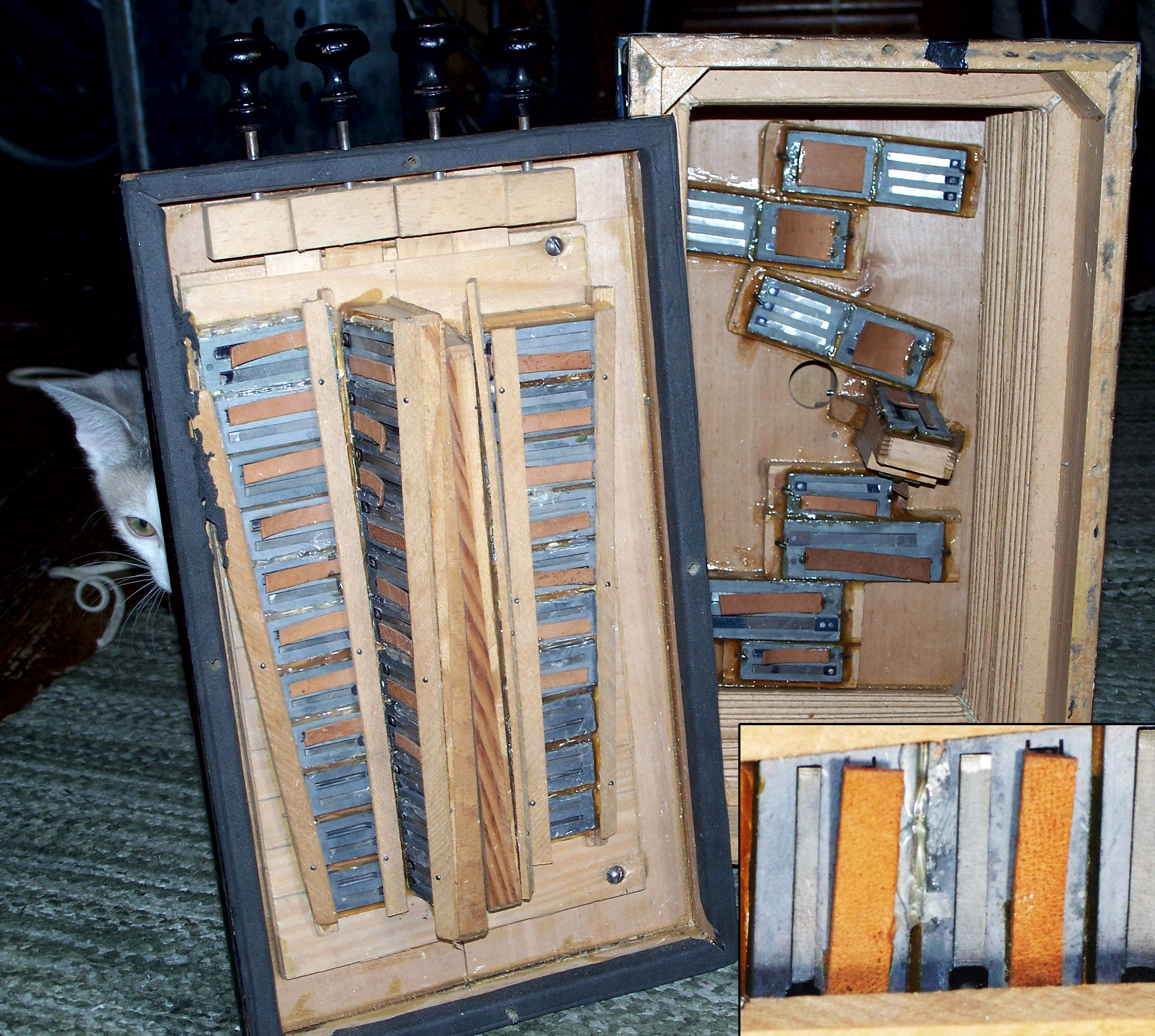
The reeds of an early 20th-century button accordion, with closeup

A free reed aerophone is a musical instrument that produces sound as air flows past a vibrating reed in a frame. Air pressure is typically generated by breath or with a bellows. In the Hornbostel–Sachs system, it is number 412.13 (a member of interruptive free aerophones). Free reed instruments are contrasted with non-free or enclosed reed instruments, where the timbre is fully or partially dependent on the shape of the instrument body, Hornbostel–Sachs number: 42 (flute, reed, and brass).

== Operation ==
The following illustrations depict the type of reed typical of harmonicas, pitch pipes, accordions, and reed organs as it goes through a cycle of vibration. One side of the reed frame is omitted from the images for clarity; in reality, the frame completely encloses the reed. Airflow over one side of the reed (labeled "AR") creates a region of low pressure on that side (see the Bernoulli's principle article for details), causing the reed to flex towards the low-pressure side. The reed frame is constructed so that the flexing of the reed obstructs the airflow, which reduces or eliminates the low-pressure region and allows the reed to flex back.

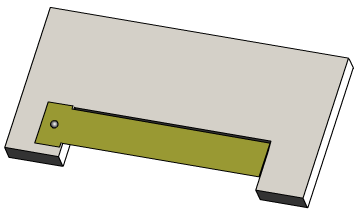

A reed is fixed by one end in a close-fitting frame. The loose end has a slight rising bend.

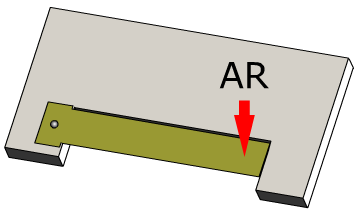

Air depression is applied under the reed; the reed prevents air flow, except for a small, high-velocity flow at the tip.

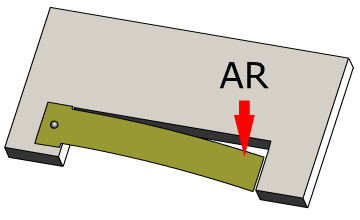

The reed is sucked through the opening, allowing the air to pass.

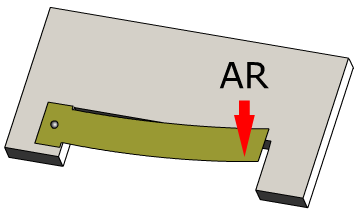

The elasticity of the reed forces it back through the frame.

Each time the reed passes through the frame, it interrupts air flow. These rapid, periodic interruptions of the air flow create the audible vibrations perceived by the listener.

In a free-reed instrument, it is generally the physical characteristics of the reed itself, such as mass, length, cross-sectional area, and stiffness, which determine the pitch of the musical note produced. Of secondary importance to the pitch are the physical dimensions of the chamber in which the reed is fitted, and of the air flow. As an exception, the pitch of the Chinese bawu and hulusi are determined by fingering recorder-like tone holes along the instrument body.

== History ==
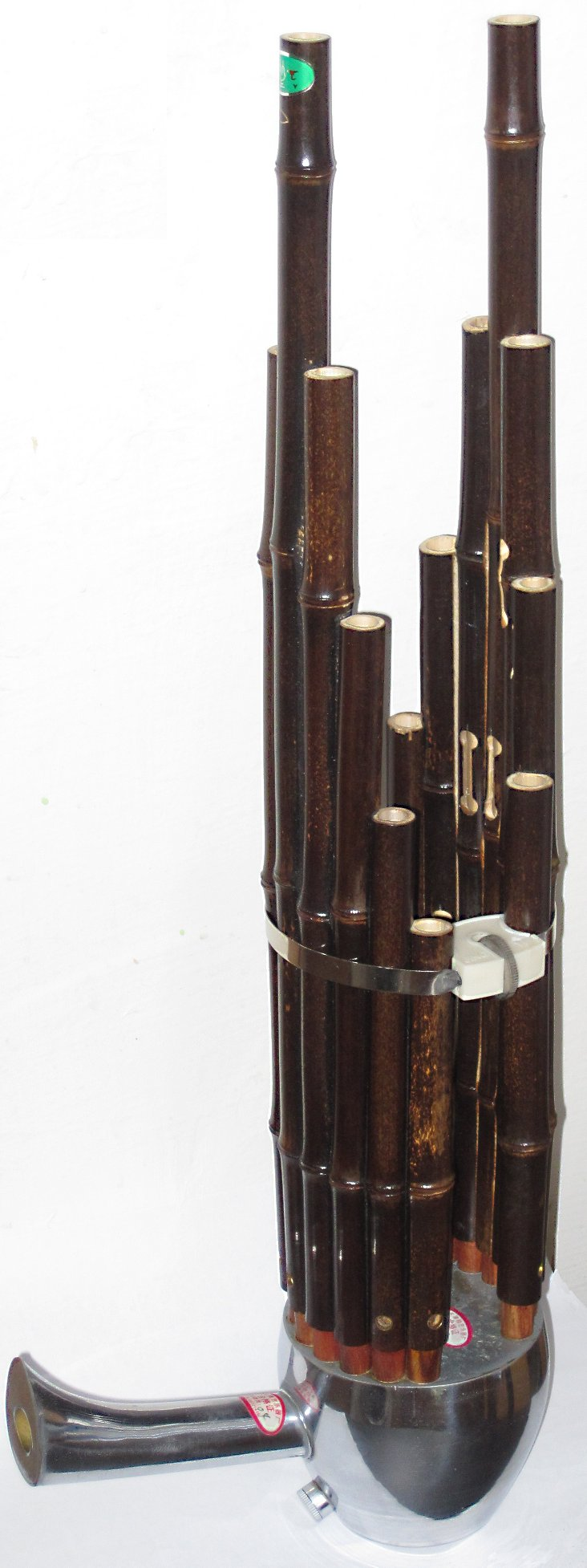
Sheng with 17 pipes; height is 55 cm (22 inches)

Various free reed instruments appear to have been invented since antiquity. The most likely precursor to free reed aerophones is the Jew's harp, an instrument known to many cultures throughout the world, and by many names (e.g., k'uang in ancient China). In this instrument, the main sound producer is the vibrating reed tongue itself, rather than the air flow.

Among the ancient instruments, the khene of Laos, the shēng of China and the later shō version of Japan have survived to modern times.

The sheng was traditionally made with bamboo pipes, and was first mentioned in the Shi Jing (11th to 7th centuries BC) of the Zhou Dynasty (c. 1050–256 BC). A free reed organ was invented in the Arab world in the 13th century, while the German Heinrich Traxdorf (fl. 15th century) of Nuremberg built one around 1460 AD. In Copenhagen, one of these instruments with brass pipes and free reeds in-caved into the sides of the pipes inspired the organ builder Kirsnick to fit similar reeds into portable organs. In 1780 Kirsnick moved to Saint Petersburg improved these new organ pipes to an adjustable pitch with a hook. Christian Gottlieb Kratzenstein also built his speaking machine in Copenhagen and he was in contact with Kirsnick. Christian Gottlieb Kratzenstein got an award for the machine in Petersburg but he never moved to Petersburg. His machine or a copy of this machine came to Paris very shortly after 1780. Georg Joseph Vogler put all his effort to get this new type of organ pipes in use in church organs so he started with changing organs in Rotterdam (1790), London (1790), (Note: He was in London 1890 and recorded this in his autobiography, but it is unclear whether this was after or before his visit to Warschau in the same year. It is also unclear if he made changes to church organs there. His Orchestrion that he was carrying with him did not use free reeds at this time.) Frankfurt (1791), Stockholm (1791), Paris (1796), Berlin (1800), Prague (1802), Vienna (1804), Salzburg Munich (1805), – up to 30 documented rebuilds of organs with new free reed type organ pipes. He also held lessons at universities and did all to promote this new type of reeds, not only in German-speaking regions of Europe. The actual work was done by different organ builders, and very many people were involved, so it is nearly impossible that any organ builder in Europe did not know about free reeds after 1800. In the two years from 1802 to 1804 in Vienna, he spent time with Johann Nepomuk Mälzel and Mälzel changed the type of reeds used in his Panharmonicon to free reed pipe. Vogler, Maelzel and Friedrich Kaufmann were then at the same time in Paris in 1807. From there, Mälzel went to Regensburg and Vienna, where he constructed a new Panharmonicon and the mechanischer Trompeter; after that he went on tour again to Paris, London and other places; maybe he went for the first time to Boston and New York as well, but up to now we don't know of any notice in a newspaper about it. Friedrich Kaufmann, a clock maker, went back home to Dresden and copied Mälzel's machines. The mechanischer Trompeter still can be seen in a museum in Munich.

=== Free reed aerophones in the United States ===
In the United States, organ builder William M. Goodrich is often claimed to have invented the free reed. He tells that he worked in 1810 to 1812 with Johann Nepomuk Mälzel's Pan Harmonicon that was sent to Boston and then exhibited in several towns. Mälzel had a very good relationship to Vogler while in Europe so his Pan Harmonicon used free reeds. It is not known with certainty whether Mälzel was personally in America around 1811. What is clear is that he arrived New York on February 7, 1826, which might have been either his first or his second visit to the New World. He also visited Boston around that time.

"In June 1811 a curious instrument called a Pan Harmonicon was brought to Boston. It was invented by Maelzel, whose name is usually linked with the Metronome. William Goodrich was employed to set up and exhibit the Pan Harmonnicon in New York and other cities. He […] traveled with the instrument from September 1811 until June 1812."

1823 Pan Harmonicun copied;

In March, 1823, Mr. Goodrich undertook to complete, with the assistance of others, a Pan Harmonicon, in imitation of that of Maelzel. Mr. Savage, the proprietor of a Museum in Boylston Hall, had kept the latter for some time on exhibition in his Museum, and had made considerable progress in constructing one like it. After his death, it was determined to complete it. Mr. Goodrich was employed, and it was finished in May, 1824. From November, 1824, till sometime in 1825, he was chiefly employed in the exhibition of this instrument;

There is a story that in 1821 James H. Bazin repaired a free reed pipe and used this type of reeds for constructing, in 1836, the "lap organ".

In an article in " The Musical World and Times " […] the invention of this class of instruments is claimed for Mr. James H. Bazin, an ingenious musician and mechanic, of Canton, Mass. […] However,[…] as will be observed […] Mr. Bazin was not the man. The account referred to contains the following :— " Late in the year of 1821, some young men from a neighboring town, brought a small, round, brass pipe, with the letter A marked on it, and a piece of thin brass screwed on one side; which brass appeared to have been made to vibrate through an opening about one-half the length of the pipe, but which had been broken off near the screw. They had borrowed this pipe from a singing-master in Boston, and wished to have Mr. Bazin repair it, […] We have a legend, in which it is asserted that the free reed was the invention of a German shoemaker [Maelzel], who, captivated with the sweet sounds produced by it,[…],

From 1833, Prescott built similar instruments.

In 1831 Prescott […]. On a business trip to Boston he saw an "elbow organ" or lap organ ("rocking melodeon") built by James Bazin. Seeing the potential of this small REED ORGAN, he commenced manufacturing them in 1836 or 1837 – both the button (melodeon) and the conventional keyboard type; Video of "rocking melodeon"

==== Melodeons in 1840 ====
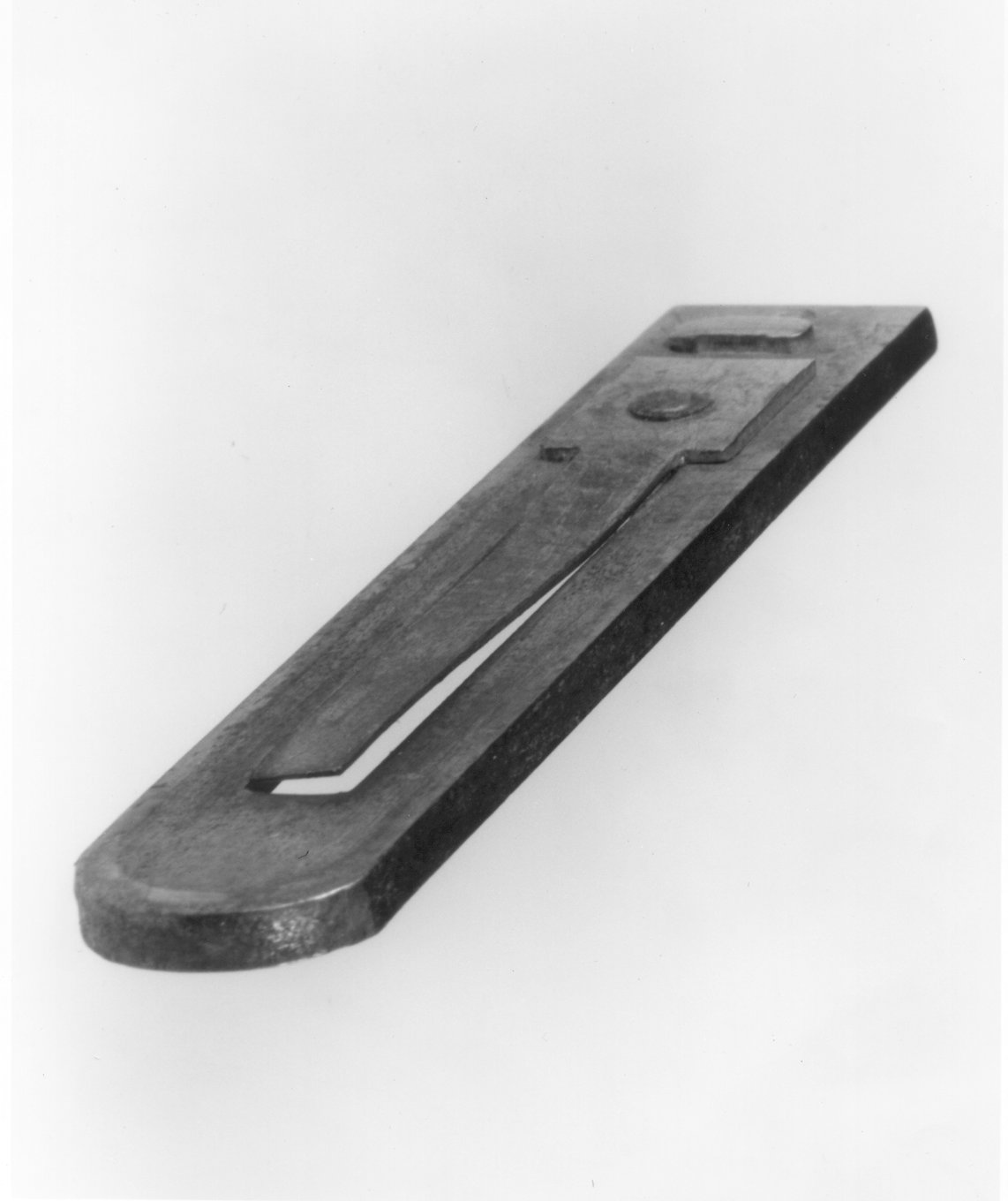
Free reed from a melodion, 1867

By 1840, there were 40 melodeon builders in America.

"Melodeons were inexpensive, easy to move, and required a minimum of upkeep. These features were so attractive that by 1840 there were forty melodeon builders in the United States, with an annual product of $646,975, but reports listed only twenty pipe organ builders, with an annual product of $324,750 [13, p.132]"

=== Europe ===
Cyrill Demian's (see below) patent of 1829 however states that the reeds in his instrument "were known for more than 200 years as Regale, Zungen, Schnarrwerk, in organs." He compares the reeds used by him with beating reeds.

=== The accordion in Russia ===
The earliest history of the accordion in Russia is poorly documented. Nevertheless, according to Russian researchers, the earliest known simple accordions were made in Tula, Russia by Timofey Vorontsov from 1820, and Ivan Sizov from 1830. By the late 1840s, the instrument was already very widespread; together the factories of the two masters were producing 10,000 instruments a year. By 1866, over 50,000 instruments were being produced yearly by Tula and neighbouring villages, and by 1874 the yearly production rate was over 700,000. By the 1860s, Novgorod, Vyatka and Saratov Governorates also had significant accordion production. By the 1880s, the list included Oryol, Ryazan, Moscow, Tver, Vologda, Kostroma, Nizhny Novgorod, Simbirsk and others, and many of these places created their own varieties of the instrument. The first chromatic piano-like accordions in Russia were built in 1871 by Nikolay Ivanovich Beloborodov.

In 1907, St. Petersburg master accordion maker V. S. Sterlingov created a chromatic button accordion for the player Ya. F. Orlandskiy-Titarenko featuring 52 melody keys and 72 chords of the Stradella bass system. Orlandskiy-Titarenko called his new instrument the bayan (after the legendary bard Boyan), and it was the ancestor of the modern instrument with that name. However, its layout on the melody side was different from the layout of the modern bayan. The modern bayan's B-system layout (or "Moscow system") became more popular than the early instrument's "Leningrad system" (which was more similar to the Khromka garmon) around 1930–35.

Between 1953 and 1968, the yearly production of button accordions (garmons and bayans) in the Soviet Union ranged between 597,307 and 921,674 instruments, while the yearly production of piano accordions ranged between 7,124 and 120,313 instruments (averaging around 50,000).

=== Examples ===
- Querhammerflügel with Aeoline, circa 1810, made by Johann Kasper Schlimbach at Königshofen Bayern, using steel reeds and frames made in one part.
- The accordion, patented in 1829 by Armenian-Austrian inventor Cyrill Demian.
- The concertina, patented in two forms (perhaps independently) by:
  - Sir Charles Wheatstone, in 1829 and 1844;
  - Carl Friedrich Uhlig, 1834.
- The harmoneon, patented in 1952 by Pierre Monichon, a French musicologist and accordionist.

Additionally, there are other free-reed instruments, such as the well-known and versatile harmonica (one of the smallest free reeds). The harmonium, or pump-organ, has numerous forms, including the orthotonophonium and the peti or samvadini (the Indian floor harmonium, used often as accompaniment in Indian classical music performances). The martinshorn hails from Germany, while the melodica has seen many applications across numerous styles of music, including reggae and Caribbean music.

The bandoneon (Spanish: bandoneón), a slightly larger concertina, was named by German inventor Heinrich Band; by the late 1800s, the instrument was significantly popular across parts of South America, notably Argentina and Uruguay; compared to the standard concertina, which was and is widely utilised in various genres of folk and traditional music, the bandoneon's original intended use was to only be played for Christian devotional or religious ceremonies, such as masses (liturgy), weddings, and other related holy or sacred events, especially in chapels too small for an organ or harmonium or by traveling clergy, such as missionaries, circuit riders, or military chaplains.

== Related instruments ==
In the related woodwind instruments, a vibrating reed is used to set a column of air in vibration within the instrument. In such instruments, the pitch is primarily determined by the effective length of that column of air. Although the Chinese sheng, Japanese sho and Laotian khene have pipes, the pipes do not determine the pitch. In these instruments, the pipes serve as resonating chambers.

The pump organ and Indian harmonium instruments also use free reeds.
