= The Schooner Gang =

- Directed by: W. Devenport Hackney
- Written by: Frank Atkinson; Ralph Dawson; W. Devenport Hackney; Iris Terry
- Produced by: W. Devenport Hackney
- Starring: Vesta Victoria; Billy Percy; Gerald Barry
- Cinematography: Jack Parker; Gerald Gibbs
- Production company: New Garrick Productions
- Distributed by: Butcher's Film Service
- Release date: 1937
- Running time: 72 minutes
- Country: United Kingdom
- Language: English

The Schooner Gang is a 1937 British crime film directed by W. Devenport Hackney and starring Vesta Victoria, Billy Percy and Gerald Barry. It was written by Frank Atkinson, Ralph Dawson, Hackney and Iris Terry, and was made as a quota quickie at Cricklewood Studios. Location shooting took place in Leigh-on-Sea.

== Preservation status ==
The British Film Institute National Archive holds a collection of stills but no film or video materials.

== Synopsis ==
Former music-hall star Mrs. Truman is the landlady of an inn called "The Crooked Billet", helped by daughter Mary and son Ben. Ben, an ex-crook, is blackmailed by his former criminal colleagues into cracking a safe. The gang is disturbed during the robbery and Ben escapes with a necklace which he hides in an aspidistra pot at the inn, before he goes into hiding himself. The gang track him down and murder him, and in a fight at the inn the aspidistra pot is smashed, revealing the necklace. The crooks are arrested, and Mrs. Truman collects the reward money for the jewellery.

== Cast ==
- Vesta Victoria as Mrs. Truman
- Billy Percy as Freddie Fellowes
- Gerald Barry as Carleton
- Percy Honri as Adam
- Mary Honri as Mary
- Betty Norton as Mary Truman
- Basil Broadbent as Jack Norris
- Frank Atkinson as Ben Worton

== Reception ==
The Monthly Film Bulletin wrote: "The tavern sing-songs are pleasant and tuneful; Vesta Victoria as Mrs. Truman sings some old favourites. Some of the crook scenes are exciting, and Frank Atkinson as Ben gives them reality, but the other characters are stagey. The photography and lighting are crude."

The Daily Film Renter wrote: "The unreality of the action may perhaps handicap the cast, but it is not intended to be more than robust fare. Vesta Victoria, however, as proprietress of the pub around which the story centres, puts over one or two old-time music hall songs with good effect, while Mary Honri renders some lilting ballads, and the Gerrard Quartet contribute rousing sea shanties. As it also has plenty of things happening most of the time, it should go down well with the masses in most big industrial towns."

Picture Show wrote: "It is unconvincing from beginning to end, and the acting and dialogue do not help."
