= Pierre Monichon =

French musicologist and accordionist

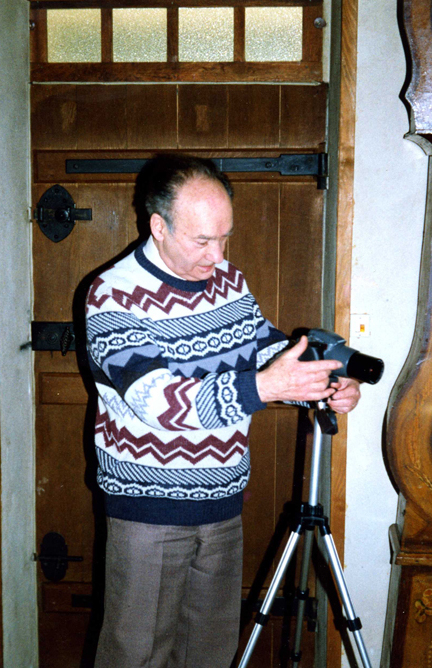
- Pierre Monichon at the 'Mainson des boits".
- Born: 24 October 1925; Lyon, France
- Died: 1 September 2006 (aged 80)
- Known for: Inventor of the Harmoneon, research on Free reed aerophones
- Awards: Chevallier of the Ordre des Arts et des Lettres

Pierre Monichon (24 October 1925 – 1 September 2006) was a French accordionist, musicologist and inventor of the harmoneon (also concert accordion). He published several books on the history of the Accordion, and was a professor at both the CRR93, where he taught a course on the concert accordion and the Conservatoire National de la Région Aubervillers, where he was a professor of the history of music. Monichon was a member of the Ordre des Arts et des Lettres for his contributions to music, achieving the rank of "Chevallier" in 1982.

== Biography ==
Pierre Monichon was born in Lyon, France on 24 October 1925. He trained at the École César-Franck under Yves Margat, studying the piano, counterpoint and the history of music. From 1945, Monichon tried to promote the accordion among classical musicians, inventing the harmoneon in 1948 to solve some of the problems he saw in traditional accordions – namely the stradella bass system, fixing this by creating his own keyboard layout. He then formed several societies for its promotion, as well as teaching it with his student, Charles Taupin at the Paris Conservatory, in a course that exists to this day.

== Research ==
Monichon was a pioneering researcher on the history of free reed instruments – his thesis at École César-Franck was the first in France on the subject of the accordion. Pierre wrote several books on the history of accordions:

- L'accordeon – first published in 1971, 12 editions published in total.
- Petite histoire de l'accordéon – published in 1958 with Guy de Lioncourt
- Méthode d'harmonéon : accordéon de concert français – published in 1997.
- L'Accordéon, Van de Velde, Paris und Payot, Lausanne, 1985
- L'Accordéon, Pierre Monichon/Alexandre, Juan éditions Cyrill Demian, 2012

== Teaching ==
Monichon was the teacher of several renowned accordionists, such as Alain Abott.
