= Alexander Prince =

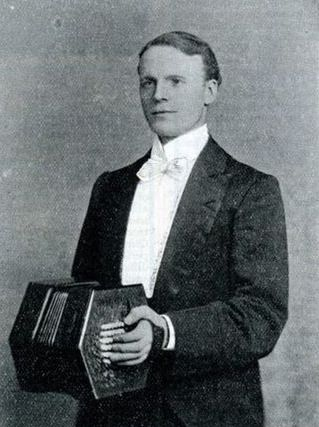
- Prince in 1906

Background information
- Born: 1874; Aberdeen, Scotland
- Died: 1928 (aged 53–54)
- Instrument: concertina
- Labels: Zonophone, Columbia Records

Alexander Prince (1874 – 1928) was an early 20th-century vaudeville musician and recording artist who played the McCann-system Duet concertina (usually spelt 'Maccann'. Born Alexander Sutherland in Aberdeen, Scotland, he was first given a concertina at age 8 by his music shop-owner father, who wanted to give him something to do after a broken leg rendered him immobile. Of this event, Prince said, "I am, or was, alas an infant prodigy. It was an accident, primarily. I was 8 years old, and I broke my leg. I had to lie in bed, and that was the start." He started to perform while still a youth, and by 1889 London's The Era newspaper mentioned him in a review of the club Alhambra Palace: "Alexander Prince plays the concertina with great effect, and is rewarded with much applause." After performing at the Glasgow Exhibition at age 20, Prince went on to perform internationally, including a 1904 tour in South Africa.

Scotch Reels
Prince playing Scotch Reels on a concertina (1909)

Prince was among the first recorded concertinists, starting with cylinder recordings for Edison-Bell circa 1904. He released the first of his records with Zonophone in February 1906. He later released works under Columbia Records and other labels through the 1920s. Several were under the alias George King. Prince's popular records were reprinted under budget labels in the United States and in the United Kingdom.

When not on tour, Prince spent his later years in Nottingham. He died in 1928.
