= The Bartered Bride (1932 film) =

1932 musical comedy film by Max Ophüls

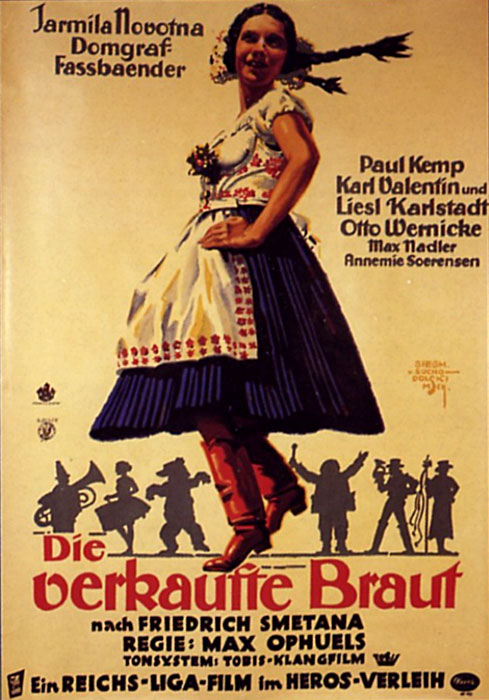
- Directed by: Max Ophüls
- Written by: Curt Alexander (writer); Max Ophüls (writer); Karel Sabina (libretto)
- Produced by: Hermann Rosenfeld; Ludwig Scheer
- Starring: Jarmila Novotná; Otto Wernicke; Karl Valentin
- Cinematography: Franz Koch; Reimar Kuntze
- Edited by: Paul May
- Music by: Theo Mackeben
- Production company: Bavaria Film
- Distributed by: Bavaria Film
- Release date: 18 August 1932
- Running time: 77 minutes
- Country: Weimar Republic
- Language: German

The Bartered Bride (German: Die verkaufte Braut) is a 1932 German musical comedy film directed by Max Ophüls and starring Jarmila Novotná, Otto Wernicke, and Karl Valentin. It is based on the comic opera of the same name by Czech composer Bedřich Smetana. It was shot at the Bavaria Studios in Munich. The film's sets were designed by the art director Erwin Scharf.

== Plot ==
The Bartered Bride is the comic misadventure of two mismatched couples.

1859 at a church consecration festival in Bohemia. The matchmaker Kezal wants to match the mayor's daughter Marie to Wenzel, the son of rich Micha. However, Marie falls in love with the post coach Hans and hides with him in the hustle and bustle of the church consecration festival.

Meanwhile, the traveling circus Brummer has arrived, and Wenzel has his eye on the artist Esmeralda, circus director Brummer's foster daughter. Marie and Wenzel's parents are dissatisfied with this development. So, Marie is locked in her room and the mayor does not give the circus permission to perform.

Kezal offers Hans 300 guilders if he gives up Marie, and when he accepts the money, word gets around that he has sold his bride. The humiliated Marie is now ready to marry Wenzel. But Hans only accepted the money because the circus needed it to be able to play. When a circus bear escapes and Hans saves Marie from the bear, everything comes back into order. The parents agree, Wenzel gets Esmeralda, and even Kezal is reimbursed twice for his expenses.

== Cast ==
- Jarmila Novotná as Marie
- Willi Domgraf-Fassbaender as Hans
- Otto Wernicke as Kezal
- Karl Valentin as Rudolph Brummer
- Liesl Karlstadt as Katinka Brummer
- Paul Kemp as Wenzel
- Annemarie Sörensen as Esmeralda Brummer, their daughter
- Max Schreck as Muff, a comedian
- Hans Appel
- Ernst Ziegler
- Max Nadler as Mayor
- Hermann Kner as Micha
- Maria Janowska as Micha's Wife, Agnes
- Karl Riedel as First policeman
- Georg Holl as Second policeman
- Richard Ryen
- Lothar Körner
- Lotte Deyers
- Mary Weiß
- Trude Haefelin
- Dominik Löscher
- Kurt Horwitz as Singer
- Therese Giehse as Photo Concession Barker
- Eduard Mathes-Roeckel
- Max Duffek
- Beppo Brem as Bauernbursch

== Soundtrack ==
- "Overture"
- Otto Wernicke, Paul Kemp, Max Nadler and Maria Janowska – "Alles ist so gut wie richtig"
- "Das ist treue Liebe"
- Jarmila Novotná and Willy Domgraf-Fassbaender – "Fließe, Wasser, fließe
- Chorus – "Bohemian Folk Dance"
- Jarmila Novotná – "Jungfrau Maria"
- Jarmila Novotná and Willy Domgraf-Fassbaender – "Heut bin ich dein, jetzt bist du mein"
- Jarmila Novotná – "Wenn du gehst, ich will nicht klagen"
- Otto Wernike and Willy Domgraf-Fassbaender – "Ohne Dukaten bist du verraten"
- Otto Wernicke, chorus and Jarmila Novotná – "Ruhe, Ruhe nur Geduld"
- Chorus – "Er verkaufte seine Braut"
- Annemarie Sörensen – "Alles geht am Schnürchen"
- "Prodaná nevesta" (written by Bedřich Smetana)
