= John Hill Maccann =

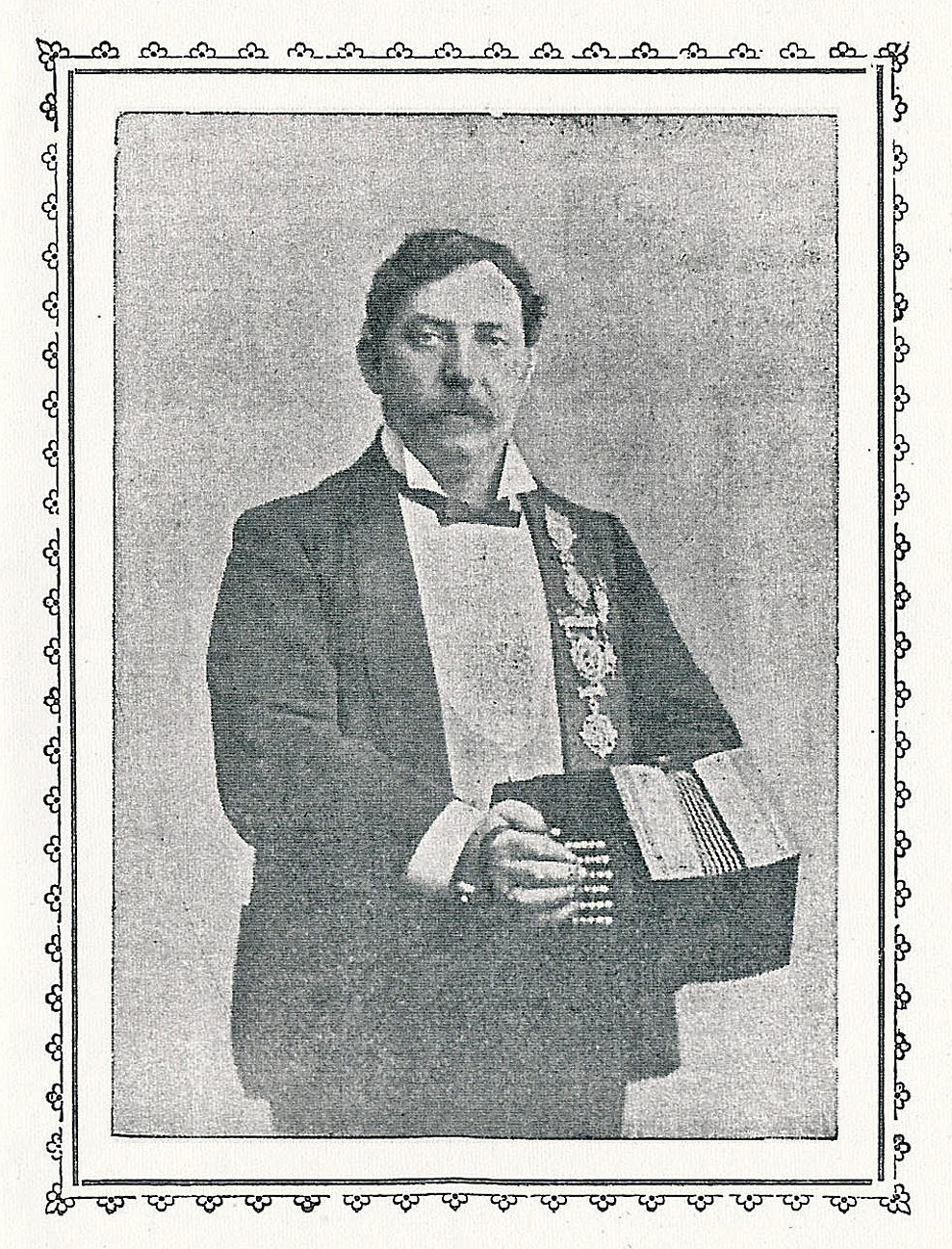
Professor Maccann circa 1902

John Hill Maccann, or Professor Maccann (variously rendered as Maccann, MacCann or McCann) (1860 – 1915) was a concertina player and designer from Plymouth, England. In 1884, Maccann patented a new design of Duet concertina, which became the first successful and most widely accepted layout of that instrument. Maccann's layout was a refinement of the earlier "Duette" system developed by Charles Wheatstone, inventor of the concertina. Initially called the "New Chromatic Duet English Concertina", it was to later be called simply the "Maccann system".

In addition to his designing, Maccann also played the concertina for earlier recordings, and toured as a musician playing the concertina (as did his mother as well). Historical records note his playing blocks of shows in Glasgow in 1888, a command performance for the Prince of Wales, an 1890–1891 North American tour, and an early 20th century tour of Australia.

== Discography ==
- The Coral Pearl, Gavotte Gramophone Concert 9118, 7 inch single sided, recorded 12 September 1900. MP3 audio at http://www.concertinas.org.uk/audio.htm
- A Frangesa, March Gramophone Concert 9119, 7 inch single sided, recorded 12 September 1900. MP3 audio at http://www.concertinas.org.uk/audio.htm
- The Beatrix Schottische Gramophone Concert 9120, 7 inch single sided, recorded 12 September 1900
- The Princess Schottische Gramophone Concert 9121, 7 inch single sided, recorded 12 September 1900
- The Empire, March Gramophone Concert 9122, 7 inch single sided, recorded 12 September 1900
- A Frangesa, March Victor 3296, 10 inch, recorded 1 May 1901. Audio at https://www.loc.gov/item/jukebox-5604/
- The Empire - quick march Zon-o-phone 607, 7 inch single sided, recorded 1901–1903
- Princess - schottische Zon-o-phone 610, 7 inch single sided, recorded 1901–1903
- A' Frangesa, march Zon-o-phone X-223, 10 inch single sided, recorded 1901–1903
- Amouretten Tanz Edison Bell 8015, wax cylinder (1902)
- The Empire March Edison Bell 8016, wax cylinder (1902)
- The Palace March Edison Bell 8017, wax cylinder (1902)
- Cupid's Arrow March Edison Bell 8018, wax cylinder (1902)
- The Mosquito Parade Edison Bell 8019, wax cylinder (1902)
- Good bye Dolly Grey Edison Bell 8020, wax cylinder (1902)
- The Empire - Quick March Columbia 200460, wax cylinder (issued July 1902)
- Good-bye Dolly Grey Columbia 200461, wax cylinder (issued July 1902)
- A Jersey Review - The Mosquito Parade Columbia 200462, wax cylinder (issued July 1902)
