= Jarmila Novotná =

Czech actress, opera singer and singer

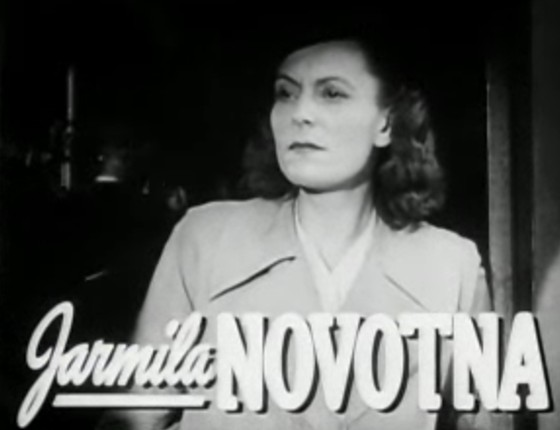
Novotná in the trailer for The Search (1948)

Jarmila Novotná (September 23, 1907 in Prague – February 9, 1994 in New York City) was a Czech lyric coloratura soprano and actress. From 1940 to 1956, she was a star of the Metropolitan Opera.

== Early career ==
A student of Emmy Destinn, Novotná made her operatic debut at the National Theatre in Prague, on June 28, 1925, as Mařenka in Smetana's The Bartered Bride. Six days later, she sang there as Violetta in Verdi's La traviata. In 1928 she starred in Verona as Gilda opposite Giacomo Lauri-Volpi in Verdi's Rigoletto and at the Teatro San Carlo in Naples as Adina opposite Tito Schipa in Donizetti's L'elisir d'amore. In 1929 she joined the Kroll Opera in Berlin, where she sang Violetta as well as the title roles of Puccini's Manon Lescaut and Madama Butterfly. In 1931 she married Jiří Daubek and moved to Liteň, where his family owned the local chateau.

In January 1933, she created the female lead in Jaromír Weinberger's new operetta Frühlingsstürme, opposite Richard Tauber at the Theater im Admiralspalast, Berlin. This was the last new operetta produced in the Weimar Republic, and she and Tauber were both soon forced to leave Germany by the new Nazi regime.

== Vienna and New York ==
In 1934 she left Berlin for Vienna, where she created the title role in Lehár's Giuditta opposite Richard Tauber. Her immense success in that role led to a contract with the Vienna State Opera, where she was named Kammersängerin. Prior to the Anschluss, she also appeared with Tauber there in The Bartered Bride and Madama Butterfly.

She appeared as Pamina in the 1937 Salzburg Festival production of Mozart's The Magic Flute, conducted by Arturo Toscanini. In the orchestra pit was the young Georg Solti, who played the glockenspiel in the opera.

During the WWII Novotná left first to Los Angeles to join Civic Light Opera and later to New York. She gave concerts for the Czech American community, including the concert at a Sokol Convention in Chicago for crowd of 60,000. In 1941 she participated in the event for 100th anniversary of Antonín Dvořák's birth with Fritz Kreisler and Harry Burleigh in New York. In 1943 Novotná recorded an album of Czech folk songs with Foreign Minister of Czechoslovakia in exile Jan Masaryk called Songs of Lidice after the village that was destroyed by the Nazis.

On January 5, 1940, she made her debut with the Metropolitan Opera, as Mimì in Puccini's La bohème. She also appeared in twelve other roles at the Met: Euridice, Violetta, Cherubino, Massenet's Manon, Mařenka, Donna Elvira, Pamina, Octavian, Antonia, Freia, Mélisande and Prince Orlofsky, the role in which she made her farewell performance on January 15, 1956. Of her 208 appearances at the Met, 103 were in the breeches roles of Prince Orlofsky, Cherubino and Octavian.

She spent the rest of her life in Vienna. Novotná wrote her memoirs My Life in Song in 1991, though the English version was only released in 2018.

== Films ==
She appeared in several films, including Max Ophüls's 1932 version of The Bartered Bride. In 1948 she won acclaim for her leading role as an Auschwitz survivor who searches for her young son, played by Ivan Jandl, in The Search which co-starred Montgomery Clift. In 1951, she appeared in The Great Caruso, starring Mario Lanza.

== Honours ==
In 1991 Novotná received the Order of Tomáš Garrigue Masaryk from the president of Czechoslovakia Václav Havel. Liteň chateau, where Novotná lived with her husband Jiří Daubek, hosts a music festival every year, which is named Festival of Jarmila Novotná in her honour.

== Filmography ==
- Vyznavači slunce (1926) as Countess Jacinta
- Fire in the Opera House (1930) as Die Primadonna
- The Beggar Student (1931) as Laura
- The Bartered Bride (1932) as Marie
- Die Nacht der großen Liebe (1933) as Frau Thormaelen
- Skřivánčí píseň (1933) as Maja Zemanova
- Frasquita (1934) as Frasquita
- The Cossack and the Nightingale (1935) as Vera Starschenska
- The Last Waltz (French version, 1936) as Countess Vera Lizavetta
- The Last Waltz (English version, 1936) as La comtesse Véra-Élisabétha Opalinsky
- The Search (1948) as Mrs. Hanna Malik
- The Great Caruso (1951) as Maria Selka

== Bibliography ==
- The Last Prima Donnas, by Lanfranco Rasponi, Alfred A Knopf, 1982. ISBN 0-394-52153-6
