= Ernst Ziegler =

German actor (1894–1974)

- Born: Ernst Aldoff; April 16, 1894; Weilerbach, Rhineland-Palatinate, German Empire
- Died: April 11, 1974 (aged 79); West Berlin, West Germany
- Occupation: Actor
- Years active: 1932-1971

Ernst Ziegler (born Ernst Aldoff, 16 April 1894 – 11 April 1974) was a German film and television actor.

== Biography ==
Ziegler was born in Weilerbach, German Empire.

He began his film career in 1932, appearing in the German musical comedy film Die verkaufte Braut (The Bartered Bride). He went on to act in other German films and on German television.

In 1970, he appeared in the American film Something for Everyone, starring Angela Lansbury.

His final film role was in the small uncredited role of Grandpa George (Charlie Bucket's grandfather) in the 1971 film Willy Wonka & the Chocolate Factory. By this time, Ziegler's health was deteriorating, and he was legally blind, partly as a result of being gassed during the First World War.

He died of emphysema in April 1974, in West Berlin, aged 79.

== Filmography ==
Year	Title	Role	Notes
1932	Die verkaufte Braut		Uncredited
1970	Something for Everyone	Elderly Man	
1970	Josefine Mutzenbacher	Alter Mann	
1971	Die nackte Gräfin	Baron Cyrill	
1971	Willy Wonka & the Chocolate Factory	Grandpa George	Uncredited; final film role
