= Percy Honri =

English music hall entertainer (1874–1953)

- Born: Percy Harry Thompson; 24 June 1874; Thorpe Mandeville, Northamptonshire, England
- Died: 24 September 1953 (aged 79); Bosham, Sussex
- Occupations: Concertina player Revue director
- Years active: 1879–1951

Percy Harry Thompson (24 June 1874 – 24 September 1953), known professionally as Percy Honri, was an English concertina player, music hall entertainer, and revue producer, with a career lasting over 70 years.

== Life and career ==
He was born at Thorpe Mandeville, Northamptonshire, a few miles from Banbury. His middle name is sometimes given as Henry, but his birth records show Harry. His parents were Henry Thompson (1851–1937) and Mary née Horwood (1852–1914), who were music hall entertainers.

Their son made his stage debut in 1879, as "Little Percy Thompson", clog dancer. He toured with his father, who worked as part of a blackface duo, "Virto and Thompson", and Percy appeared with them in 1883 at the Folies Bergère. There, Percy's name was printed in error as Percy Honri, a name which he then adopted when performing solo as "The Wonderful Infantine Tenor". After Virto left the act, he joined his parents as "The Thompson Trio" in 1884, performing in music halls and theatres. He mastered playing the concertina, particularly the newly-produced Maccann duet concertina. In 1890 the family trio performed before the Duke of Cambridge, and began billing themselves as "The Royal Thompson Trio". In 1893, they toured the United States under the auspices of Tony Pastor.

Percy Honri went solo in 1898, after his mother became ill, and toured the Orpheum Circuit in the U.S., singing and playing the concertina. While there, he was the first to make concertina recordings, for the Berliner Gramophone company. The following year, he made his first solo appearance in London. He continued to make concertina recordings in Britain, mainly for the Zonophone label, and toured widely in his own shows, billed as "The World’s Greatest Concertinist". He was reportedly invited by John Philip Sousa to join his orchestra, but declined. In 1902 he married Nan Broadhead, a daughter of Blackpool-based theatre developer William Henry Broadhead.

During the 1900s he was the first to introduce bioscope back projections into his act (citation?). He also pioneered the idea of the touring revue with his "Concordia" show. Between 1906 and 1910 he toured with his own company, of up to 100 performers, and the following year the show had a residency at the London Palladium with performances twice a day. He played there regularly from then on, and in 1918 had a contract guaranteeing him annual performances at the theatre. In 1913 he found great success with his revue "What About It", with a series of spectacular musical numbers.

After the First World War he reverted to performing as a solo act, "The KIng of the Concertina", until in 1935 he began performing with his daughter Mary Honri Thompson (1910–1988), who played the piano and piano accordion. They performed an act called "A Concert-in-a-Turn", and worked regularly in revues, variety shows and summer seasons. Honri also appeared in the films Lily of Killarney (1934) and The Schooner Gang (1937). He retired in 1951.

Percy Honri died in Bosham, Sussex, in 1953, at the age of 79.

== Legacy ==
His grandson, Peter Honri (1929–2016) was an actor and performer, and wrote a book on the family's history, Working the Halls, in 1973. He was also active in the campaign to save Wilton's Music Hall in London.
