= Ralph Dawson =

American film editor (1897–1962)

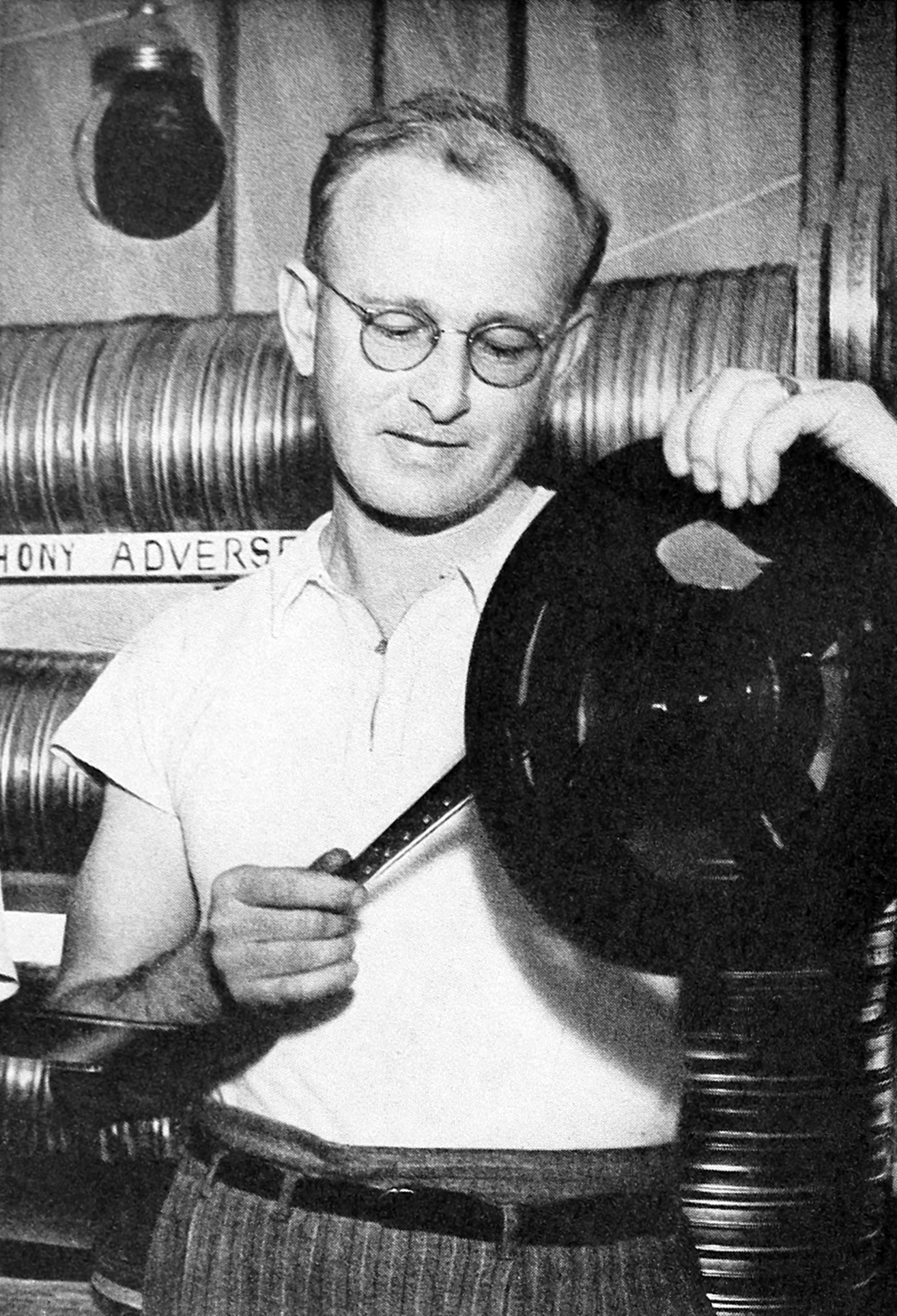
- Dawson with film reels and canisters for Anthony Adverse (1936)
- Born: April 18, 1897; Westborough, Massachusetts, U.S.
- Died: November 15, 1962 (aged 65); Hollywood, Los Angeles, California, United States
- Occupation: Film editor

Ralph Dawson (April 18, 1897 – November 15, 1962) was an American film editor who also did some acting, directing, and screenwriting. He was nominated for the Academy Award for Best Film Editing four times, and won the Award three times. He died on November 15, 1962.

== Selected filmography as editor ==
Editor
| Year | Film | Director | Notes | Other notes |
|---|---|---|---|---|
| 1925 | Lady of the Night | Monta Bell | | |
| 1927 | Beware of Married Men | Archie Mayo | | |
| 1927 | If I Were Single | Roy Del Ruth | First collaboration with Roy Del Ruth | |
| 1928 | Tenderloin | Michael Curtiz | First collaboration with Michael Curtiz | |
| 1928 | Five and Ten Cent Annie | Roy Del Ruth | Second collaboration with Roy Del Ruth | |
| 1928 | Caught in the Fog | Howard Bretherton | | |
| 1928 | Black Butterflies | James W. Horne | | |
| 1928 | The Singing Fool | Lloyd Bacon | First collaboration with Lloyd Bacon | |
| 1928 | Beware of Bachelors | Roy Del Ruth | Third collaboration with Roy Del Ruth | |
| 1929 | Stark Mad | Lloyd Bacon | Second collaboration with Lloyd Bacon | |
| 1929 | The Desert Song | Roy Del Ruth | Fourth collaboration with Roy Del Ruth | |
| 1930 | Under a Texas Moon | Michael Curtiz | Second collaboration with Michael Curtiz | |
| 1930 | Big Boy | Alan Crosland | | |
| 1930 | Outward Bound | Robert Milton | | |
| 1931 | My Past | Roy Del Ruth | Fifth collaboration with Roy Del Ruth | |
| 1931 | Blonde Crazy | Roy Del Ruth | Sixth collaboration with Roy Del Ruth | |
| 1931 | The Mad Genius | Michael Curtiz | Third collaboration with Michael Curtiz | |
| 1931 | Her Majesty, Love | William Dieterle | First collaboration with William Dieterle | |
| 1932 | High Pressure | Mervyn LeRoy | First collaboration with Mervyn LeRoy | |
| 1932 | Jewel Robbery | William Dieterle | Second collaboration with William Dieterle | |
| 1932 | One Way Passage | Tay Garnett | | |
| 1933 | Girl Missing | Robert Florey | First collaboration with Robert Florey | |
| 1933 | The Silk Express | Ray Enright | | |
| 1934 | Something Always Happens | Michael Powell | | |
| 1934 | The Firebird | William Dieterle | Third collaboration with William Dieterle | |
| 1934 | Sweet Adeline | Mervyn LeRoy | Second collaboration with Mervyn LeRoy | |
| 1935 | A Midsummer Night's Dream | William Dieterle | Fourth collaboration with William Dieterle | |
| 1935 | Dr. Socrates | William Dieterle | Fifth collaboration with William Dieterle | |
| 1936 | The Story of Louis Pasteur | William Dieterle | Sixth collaboration with William Dieterle | |
| 1936 | Anthony Adverse | Mervyn LeRoy | Third collaboration with Mervyn LeRoy | |
| 1936 | Three Men on a Horse | Mervyn LeRoy | Fourth collaboration with Mervyn LeRoy | |
| 1937 | The Prince and the Pauper | William Keighley | First collaboration with William Keighley | |
| 1937 | Another Dawn | William Dieterle | Seventh collaboration with William Dieterle | |
| 1937 | First Lady | Stanley Logan | | |
| 1938 | The Adventures of Robin Hood | Michael Curtiz; William Keighley | Fourth collaboration with Michael Curtiz; Second collaboration with William Keighley | |
| 1938 | Four Daughters | Michael Curtiz | Fifth collaboration with Michael Curtiz | |
| 1938 | The Dawn Patrol | Edmund Goulding | First collaboration with Edmund Goulding | |
| 1939 | Yes, My Darling Daughter | William Keighley | Third collaboration with William Keighley | |
| 1939 | Daughters Courageous | Michael Curtiz | Sixth collaboration with Michael Curtiz | |
| 1939 | Espionage Agent | Lloyd Bacon | Third collaboration with Lloyd Bacon | |
| 1939 | Four Wives | Michael Curtiz | Seventh collaboration with Michael Curtiz | |
| 1940 | 'Til We Meet Again | Edmund Goulding | Second collaboration with Edmund Goulding | |
| 1940 | Knute Rockne, All American | Lloyd Bacon | Fourth collaboration with Lloyd Bacon | |
| 1941 | Four Mothers | William Keighley | Fourth collaboration with William Keighley | |
| 1941 | The Great Lie | Edmund Goulding | Third collaboration with Edmund Goulding | |
| 1941 | Manpower | Raoul Walsh | First collaboration with Raoul Walsh | |
| 1942 | Kings Row | Sam Wood | First collaboration with Sam Wood | |
| 1942 | Larceny, Inc. | Lloyd Bacon | Fifth collaboration with Lloyd Bacon | |
| 1942 | George Washington Slept Here | William Keighley | Fifth collaboration with William Keighley | |
| 1944 | The Adventures of Mark Twain | Irving Rapper | | |
| 1944 | Mr. Skeffington | Vincent Sherman | | |
| 1944 | Experiment Perilous | Jacques Tourneur | | |
| 1945 | The Spanish Main | Frank Borzage | | |
| 1945 | Saratoga Trunk | Sam Wood | Second collaboration with Sam Wood | |
| 1946 | Heartbeat | Sam Wood | Third collaboration with Sam Wood | Uncredited |
| 1946 | Lady Luck | Edwin L. Marin | | |
| 1947 | Honeymoon | William Keighley | Sixth collaboration with William Keighley | |
| 1947 | Ivy | Sam Wood | Fourth collaboration with Sam Wood | |
| 1947 | Ride the Pink Horse | Robert Montgomery | First collaboration with Robert Montgomery | |
| 1948 | All My Sons | Irving Reis | | |
| 1948 | Rogues' Regiment | Robert Florey | Second collaboration with Robert Florey | |
| 1948 | An Act of Murder | Michael Gordon | | |
| 1949 | Once More, My Darling | Robert Montgomery | Second collaboration with Robert Montgomery | |
| 1949 | Free for All | Charles Barton | | |
| 1949 | Undertow | William Castle | | |
| 1950 | Deported | Robert Siodmak | | |
| 1950 | Peggy | Fred de Cordova | | |
| 1950 | Harvey | Henry Koster | | |
| 1950 | Mystery Submarine | Douglas Sirk | | Uncredited |
| 1951 | Sealed Cargo | Alfred L. Werker | | |
| 1952 | A Girl in Every Port | Chester Erskine | | |
| 1952 | The Lusty Men | Nicholas Ray | | |
| 1952 | Blackbeard the Pirate | Raoul Walsh | Second collaboration with Raoul Walsh | |
| 1953 | Island in the Sky | William A. Wellman | First collaboration with William A. Wellman | |
| 1953 | Hondo | John Farrow | | |
| 1954 | The High and the Mighty | William A. Wellman | Second collaboration with William A. Wellman | |
| 1956 | The Boss | Byron Haskin | | |
| 1956 | Flight to Hong Kong | Joseph M. Newman | | Uncredited |

Actor
| Year | Film | Director | Role | Notes |
|---|---|---|---|---|
| 1935 | Skybound | Raymond K. Johnson | Plainclothesman | Uncredited |
| 1937 | The Schooner Gang | W. Devenport Hackney | —N/a | Uncredited |

Director
| Year | Film |
|---|---|
| 1929 | The Girl in the Glass Cage |
| 1933 | The Bermondsey Kid |
| 1934 | The Life of the Party |

Writer
| Year | Film | Director |
|---|---|---|
| 1937 | The Schooner Gang | W. Devenport Hackney |
| 1938 | The Dance of Death | Gerald Blake |
| 1950 | Soho Conspiracy | Cecil Williamson |

Shorts

Editor
| Year | Film | Director |
|---|---|---|
| 1948 | Charlie Barnet and His Orchestra in Redskin Rhumba | Will Cowan |
| 1948 | Buddy Rich and His Orchestra | Will Cowan |

== Awards and nominations ==
| Year of ceremony | Ceremony | Award | Nominated work | Result | Ref. |
|---|---|---|---|---|---|
| 1936 | 8th Academy Awards | Best Film Editing | A Midsummer Night's Dream | Won | |
| 1937 | 9th Academy Awards | Best Film Editing | Anthony Adverse | Won | |
| 1939 | 11th Academy Awards | Best Film Editing | The Adventures of Robin Hood | Won | |
| 1955 | 27th Academy Awards | Best Film Editing | The High and the Mighty | Nominated | |
