= Max Wallner =

German operetta librettist and screenwriter (1891–1951)

- Born: 6 July 1891; Frankfurt, German Empire
- Died: May 27, 1951 (aged 59); Mondsee, Austria
- Occupation: Actress
- Years active: 1932–1951

Max Wallner (6 July 1891 – 27 May 1951) was a German operetta librettist and screenwriter.

== Selected filmography ==
- Death Over Shanghai (1932)
- Contest (1932)
- Gypsy Blood (1934)
- You Are Adorable, Rosmarie (1934)
- The Last Waltz (1934)
- Roses from the South (1934)
- All Because of the Dog (1935)
- Everything for a Woman (1935)
- The Schimeck Family (1935)
- Every Day Isn't Sunday (1935)
- The Red Rider (1935)
- The Bird Seller (1935)
- Lumpaci the Vagabond (1936)
- Flowers from Nice (1936)
- The Last Waltz (1936, French)
- The Last Waltz (1936, British)
- Premiere (1937)
- Meiseken (1937)
- Premiere (1938, British)
- Falstaff in Vienna (1940)
- Bonjour Kathrin (1956)
- Season in Salzburg (1961)

== Bibliography ==
- Von Dassanowsky, Robert. Screening Transcendence: Film Under Austrofascism and the Hollywood Hope, 1933-1938. Indiana University Press, 2018
