= The Last Waltz (1936 French film) =

1936 film

- Directed by: Leo Mittler
- Written by: Reginald Arkell; Paul Schiller; Julius Brammer (libretto); Alfred Grünwald (libretto); Max Wallner (1934 film); Georg Weber (1934 film)
- Produced by: Gina Carlton
- Starring: Jean Martinelli; Jarmila Novotna; Armand Bernard
- Cinematography: Léonce-Henri Burel
- Edited by: Laslo Benedek
- Music by: Oscar Straus
- Production company: Warwick Film Productions
- Distributed by: Associated Producers & Distributors
- Release date: 1936
- Running time: 74 minutes
- Countries: France; United Kingdom
- Language: French

The Last Waltz (French:La dernière valse) is a 1936 French-British operetta film directed by Leo Mittler, and starring Jean Martinelli, Jarmila Novotna, and Armand Bernard. It was based on the 1920 operetta The Last Waltz by Oscar Straus. It was made at the Billancourt Studios in Paris. The film's sets were designed by the art director Robert Gys. A separate version was also released in Britain.

== Cast ==
- Jean Martinelli as Le comte Dimitri
- Jarmila Novotna as La comtesse Véra-Élisabétha Opalinsky
- Armand Bernard as Le vieux général
- Gerald Barry as Le prince Paul
- Josephine Huntley Wright as Babouchka
- Alla Donell
- Gautier-Sylla
- Robert Goupil
- Robert Guillon
- Betty Huntley-Wright
- Charlotte Lysès
- Marthe Mellot
- Pierre Piérade
- Paul Sheridan
- Nora Souané

== Bibliography ==
- Kristian Feigelson. Caméra politique: cinéma et stalinisme. Presses Sorbonne Nouvelle, 2005.
