= Duet concertina =

Musical instrument

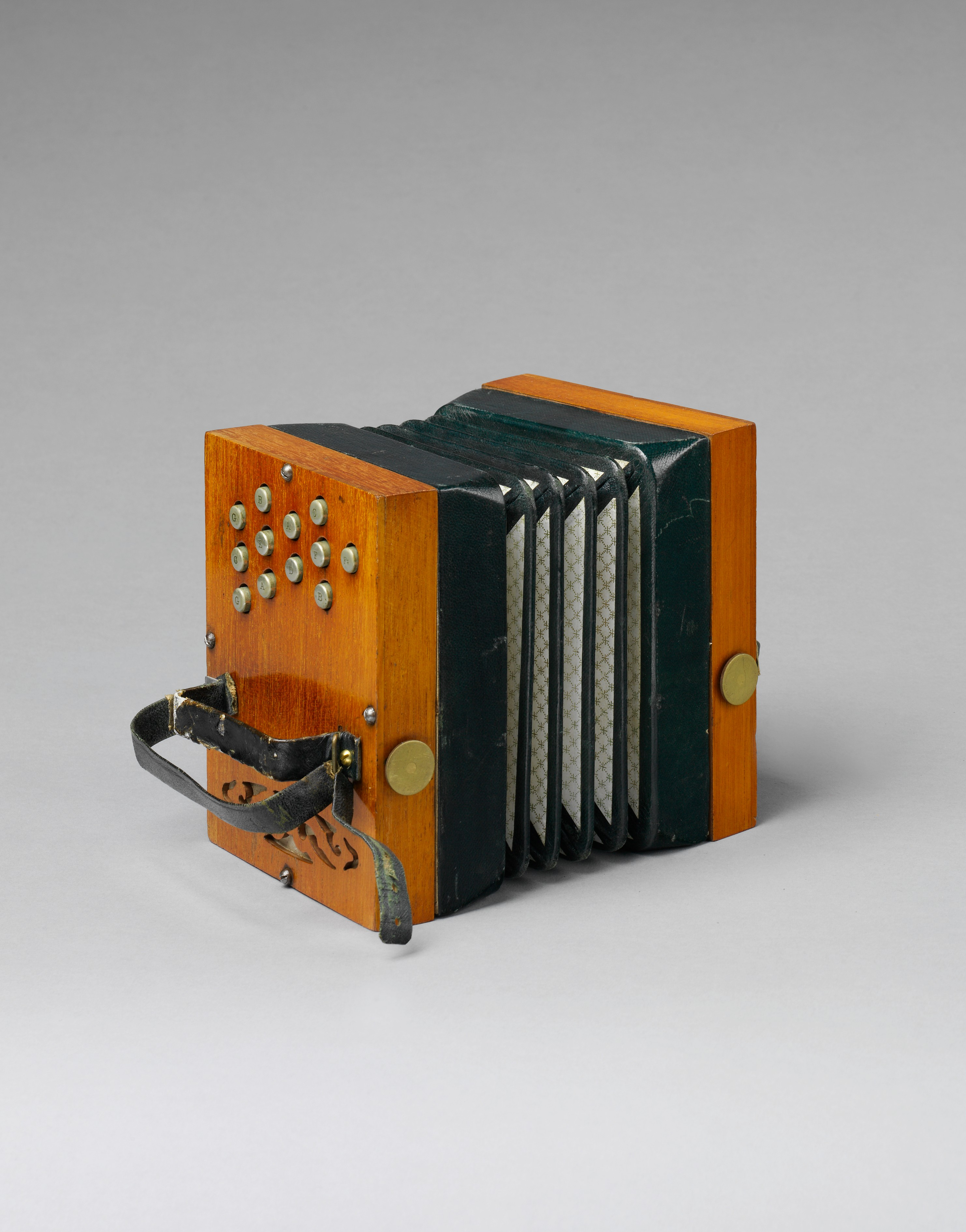
Charles Wheatstone's Duet concertina 1855–60

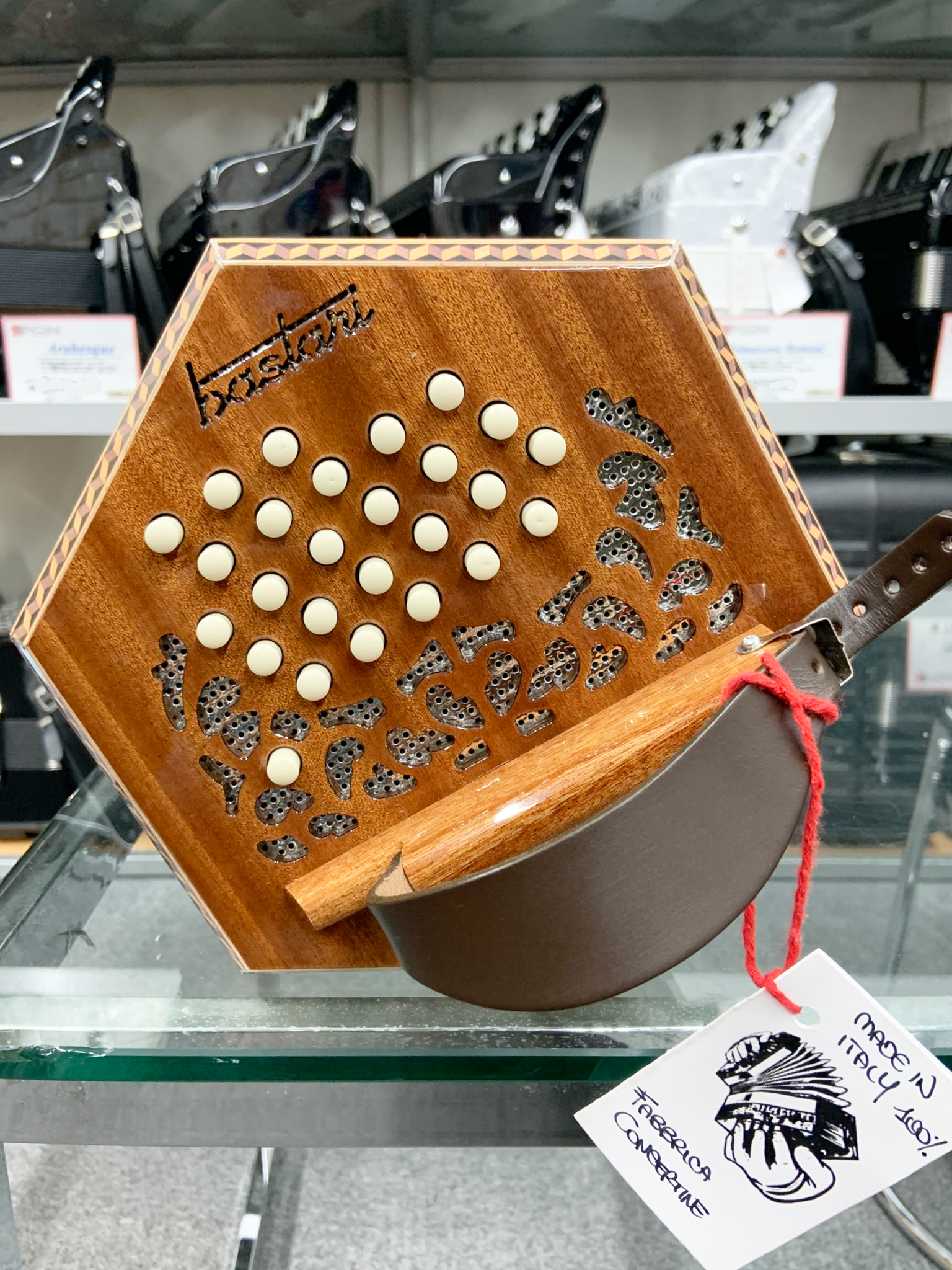
Hayden Duet concertina

The Duet concertina is a family of concertinas, distinguished by being unisonoric (producing the same note on the push and pull of the bellows, unlike the Anglo concertina) and by having their lower notes on the left and higher on the right (unlike the English concertina).

Instruments built according to various duet systems are the last development step in the history of the instrument and less common than other concertinas. Duet concertina systems aim to simplify playing a melody with an accompaniment. To this end the various duet systems feature single note button layouts that provide the lower (bass) notes in the left hand and the higher (treble) notes in the right, usually with some overlap (like a two-manual organ).

== History ==
Sir Charles Wheatstone was the first to patent a Duet concertina, in 1844; this followed his 1829 patent of the English concertina.

=== Art music ===
One of the first recorded concertina players was Alexander Prince, who as early as 1906 was recorded playing his Maccann-system Duet concertina on the Zonophone label. Fellow vaudevillian Percy Honri also specialized in the Maccann system.

=== South Africa ===
Despite the predominance of the Anglo concertina, the instrument found a small level of adoption in the Boeremusiek of the Afrikaner people of South Africa, who refer to the Crane and Maccann duet systems as the 5-ry ("five row") and 6-ry ("six row"), respectively.

== Types ==
The most common key layouts within the Duet system are:

- Maccann system (or McCann), the most widely produced vintage Duet system, an improvement on Wheatstone's earlier Duette system, patented by "Professor" John Hill Maccann in 1884 and licensed to Lachenal & Co.
- Crane system. Patented in 1896, this system was originally named the “English Combination Concertina” by the musical instrument retailer Crane & Sons Ltd. In 1912, it was adopted by the Salvation Army under the name “Triumph” and is said to be "easier to learn than the McCann or Jeffries".
- Jeffries system, less common than the above, and though unisonoric the layout of the buttons resembles that of the Anglo concertina. The distribution of notes is described as "splendidly haphazard".

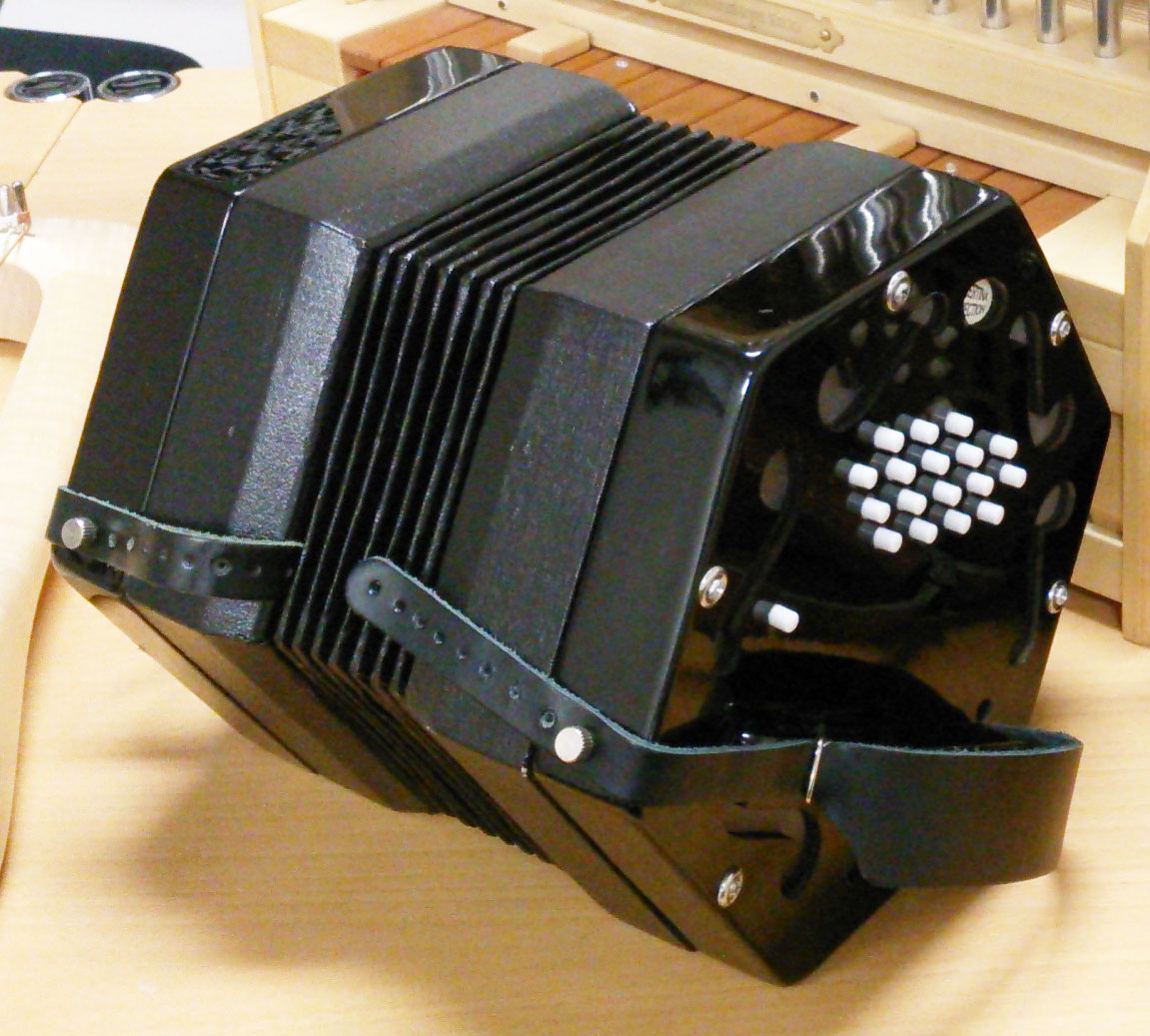
hayden system duet concertina

- Hayden system, invented in 1963 and patented in 1986, is an isomorphic system in which all scales and intervals are arranged uniformly. Years after its invention, it was discovered that a nearly identical layout had been patented by the Swiss designer Kaspar Wicki in 1896. Though a more recent development, the majority of newly produced Duet concertinas since the 1980s are in the Hayden system.

There are a number of other types, far less common: a 1983 article notes patents including "Sharp's 1890, Hank's 1896, Huish's 1901, and a number of Patents by Dr. Pitt-Taylor between 1916 and 1924." Duet concertina designer Brian Hayden has also noted the Linton, Chidley, and Piano systems, the last including variants such as the Rust system and Jedcertina. From 1951, Wheatstone made a small number of instruments in the Chidley system, which superficially resembles the Maccann system, but has a more regular note pattern.

== Play ==
Duet concertinas are held by placing the hands through a leather strap, with thumbs outside the strap and palms resting on wooden bars. The largest duets play bass notes down to C below the stave, and a competent performer can play solo piano music with little compromise.
