= Gerald Barry (actor) =

British actor

Gerald Barry was a British stage and film actor. He also co-directed the 1936 film The Last Waltz with Leo Mittler.

== Selected filmography ==
- The Unholy Night (1929)
- His Glorious Night (1929)
- Girl of the Port (1930)
- Son of India (1931)
- What Price Hollywood? (1932)
- Channel Crossing (1933)
- The Lad (1935)
- The Right Age to Marry (1935)
- The Night of the Party (1935)
- Once in a New Moon (1935)
- The Improper Duchess (1936)
- Cheer Up (1936)
- The Last Waltz (1936)
- The Crimes of Stephen Hawke (1936)
- Everything Is Rhythm (1936)
- Tropical Trouble (1936)
- Radio Lover (1936)
- Everything in Life (1936)
- La dernière valse (1936)
- It's You I Want (1936)
- The Schooner Gang (1937)
- Knights for a Day (1937)

== Bibliography ==
- Goble, Alan. The Complete Index to Literary Sources in Film. Walter de Gruyter, 1999.
