= Cyrill Demian =

18/19th-century Armenian-Austrian inventor; creator of the accordion

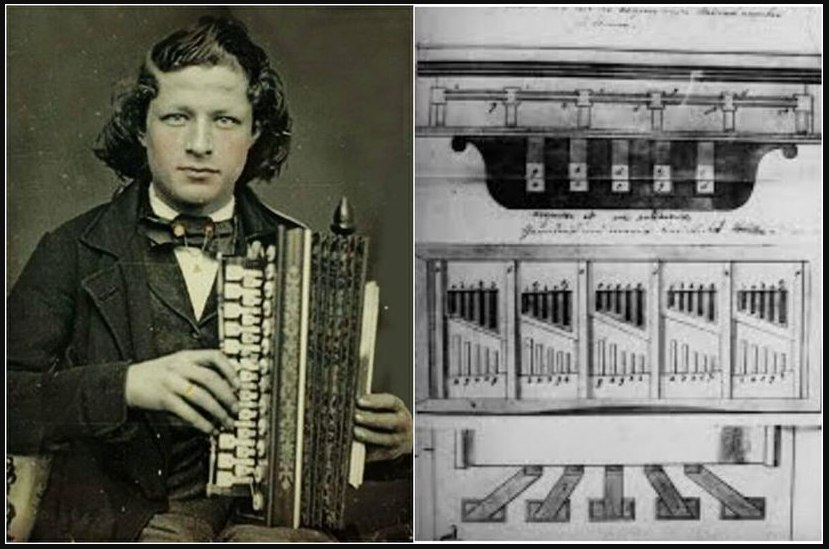
- Born: 1772; Gherla, Transylvania
- Died: 1849 (aged 76–77); Vienna, Habsburg Empire
- Occupation: Inventor
- Known for: Inventing Accordion

Cyrill Demian (1772–1849) was an Austrian inventor of Armenian-Romanian origin, who made his living as an organ and piano maker with his two sons, Karl and Guido, in Vienna, Austria. Demian was born in Gherla, Transylvania, and died in Vienna. On May 6, 1829, Cyrill and his sons presented a new instrument to the authorities for patent - the accordion. The patent was officially granted on May 23, 1829.

== Description of the accordion ==
Demian's accordion was described in the original German patent as follows: "Its appearance essentially consists of a little box with reeds of metal plates and bellows fixed to it, in such a way that it can easily be carried, and therefore traveling visitors to the country will appreciate the instrument. It is possible to perform marches, arias, melodies, even by an amateur of music with little practice, and to play the loveliest and most pleasant chords of 3, 4, 5 etc. voices after instruction."

Demian's instrument bore little resemblance to modern instruments. It only had a left hand button board, with the right hand simply operating the bellows. One key feature for which Demian sought the patent was the playing of an entire chord by depressing only one key. His instrument also could sound two different chords with the same key, one for each bellows direction (a bisonoric action). At that time in Vienna, mouth harmonicas with Kanzellen (chambers) had already been available for many years, along with bigger instruments driven by hand bellows. The diatonic key arrangement was also already in use on mouth-blown instruments. Demian's patent thus presented a new instrument for accompanying singers or other musicians: His accordion could be played with the right and the left hand simultaneously, differend from the way that earlier chromatic hand harmonicas were played, and was small and light enough for travelers to carry. The patent also described instruments with both bass and treble sections, although Demian preferred the bass-only instrument, owing to its cost and weight advantages.

One of these instruments was given to the musical instrument maker Johannes Dillner in Sweden by the Swedish Princess Margareta Brahe in the late 1820s and is now privately owned.

== The first accordion debate ==
The advent of the accordion is the subject of debate among researchers. Some historians credit Christian Friedrich Ludwig Buschmann as the inventor of the accordion, but most others give the distinction to Cyrill Demian, an Armenian-Romanian from the Transylvanian town of Szamosújvár (Gherla) (ancient Armenopolis) living in Vienna, who patented his accordion in 1829, thus coining the name. A modification of the Handäoline, Demian's invention comprised a small manual bellows and five keys, although, as Demian noted in a description of the instrument, extra keys could be incorporated into the design. Numerous variations of the device soon followed.

== The construction of Demian's accordion ==
(Translated from the original German manuscript)

1st – In a box 7 to 9 inches long, 3½ inches wide and 2 inches high, feathers of metal plates are fixed, which were known for more than 200 years as "Regale, Zungen, Schnarrwerk," in organs.

2nd – With bellows fixed to the above box and its 5 claves fixed below, even an amateur of music can play the loveliest and most moving chords of 3, 4 and 5 voices with very little practice.

3rd – Each claves or key of this instrument allows two different chords to be heard, as many keys are fixed to it, double as many chords can be heard, pulling the bellows a key gives one chord, while pushing the bellows gives the same key a second chord.

4th – As this instrument can be made with 4, 5 and 6 or even more claves, with chords arranged in alphabetical order, many well known arias, melodies and marches, etc. may be performed similar to the harmony of 3, 4 and 5 voices, with satisfaction of all anticipations of delicacy and vastly amazing comfort in increasing and decreasing sound volume.

5th – The instrument is of the same size as the attached illustration, with 5 claves and 10 chords, not heavier than 32 to 36 Loth [1 Loth = approx. 16 g, MW], only if there are more chords will it become longer and some Loths heavier, so it is easy and comfortable to carry and should be a welcome invention for travelers, country and parties visiting individuals of both sexes, especially as it can be played without the help of anybody.

Bellows

With the cover of the bellows, the entire instrument may be doubled, in order to play more chords or more single tones, in this case, keyboard, the bellows remain in the middle, while each hand controls in turn, either the claves or the bellows.

The above-mentioned duplication of the instrument or adding more chords, would not make anything better to anybody, or give something new, as only the parts would increase, and the instrument more expensive and heavier. The instrument costs 12 to 16/M M, the difference in price results in a more elegant or worse-looking appearance.

"We think that it is the most excellent innovation, that with one claves, a complete chord can be played."

== In popular culture ==
In the comic strip Garfield, Jon states that Demian is his hero.

In the colombian novel Antes del Juglar, the author makes a fictional narrative about the making of the accordion taking Cyrill Demian and his son, Guido Demian, as central characters.
