= The Last Waltz (1936 British film) =

- Directed by: Leo Mittler; Gerald Barry
- Written by: Reginald Arkell; Paul Schiller; Julius Brammer (libretto); Alfred Grünwald (libretto); Max Wallner (1934 film); Georg Weber (1934 film)
- Produced by: Gina Carlton
- Starring: Jarmila Novotna; Harry Welchman; Gerald Barry
- Cinematography: Carl Drews
- Music by: Oscar Straus; Allan Gray
- Production companies: Warwick Film Productions; Gnom-Tonfilm
- Distributed by: Associated British Film Distributors
- Release date: 21 July 1936
- Running time: 74 minutes
- Country: United Kingdom
- Language: English

The Last Waltz is a 1936 British romantic musical film. Directed by Leo Mittler, it starred Jarmila Novotna, Harry Welchman, and Gerald Barry. Barry also provided some assistance with the direction. It was made at the Billancourt Studios in Paris as the English-language version of the French film La dernière valse. It was part of a trend of operetta films during the middle of the decade, and was based on the 1920 operetta The Last Waltz by Oscar Straus.

The film's sets were designed by the art directors Robert Gys and Emil Hasler.

== Cast ==
- Jarmila Novotná as Countess Vera Lizavetta
- Harry Welchman as Count Dmitri
- Gerald Barry as Prince Paul
- Josephine Huntley Wright as Babushka
- Toni Edgar-Bruce as Countess
- Betty Huntley-Wright
- Bruce Winston
- Jack Hellier
- Paul Sheridan
- Bella Milo
- Pamela Randall
- MacArthur Gordon
- E. Fitzclarence
- Elizabeth Arkell
- Madge Snell

== Bibliography ==
- Low, Rachael. Filmmaking in 1930s Britain. George Allen & Unwin, 1985.
- Wood, Linda. British Films, 1927-1939. British Film Institute, 1986.
