= Martinshorn =

German free reed instrument

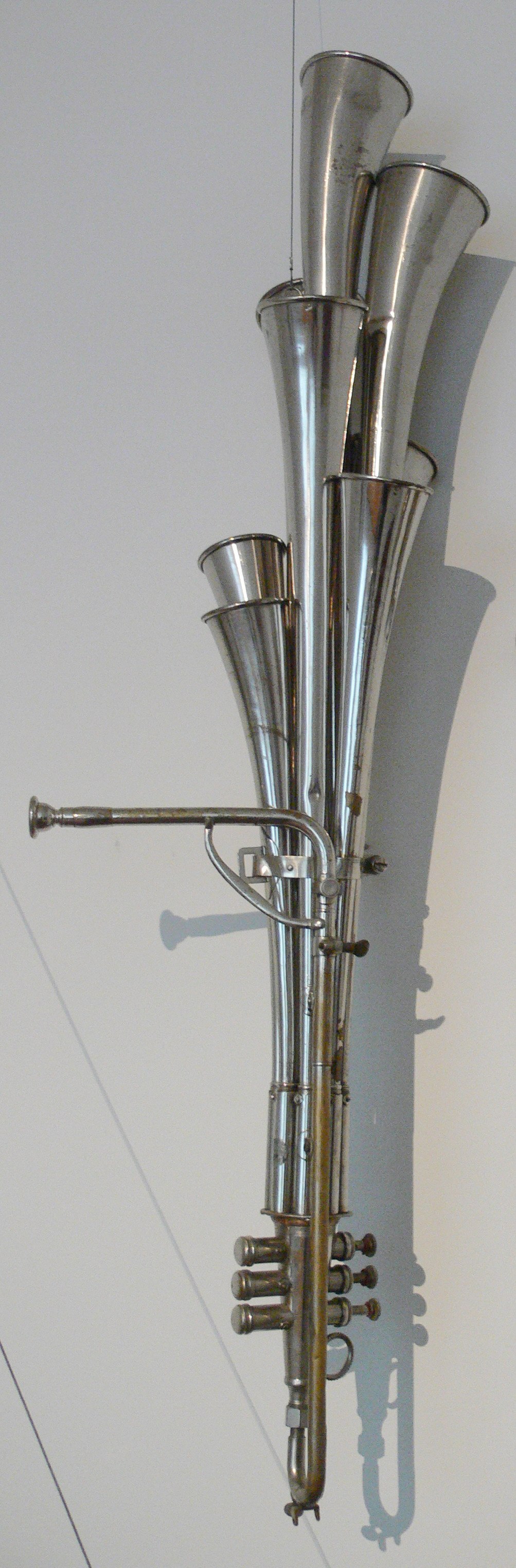
- A Martinshorn created c. 1930
- Other names: Martin's Trumpet, Schalmei
- Classification: Aerophone
- Hornbostel–Sachs classification: 412.132
- Inventor(s): Max B. Martin
- Developed: 1880

Related instruments
- Harmonica, Accordion

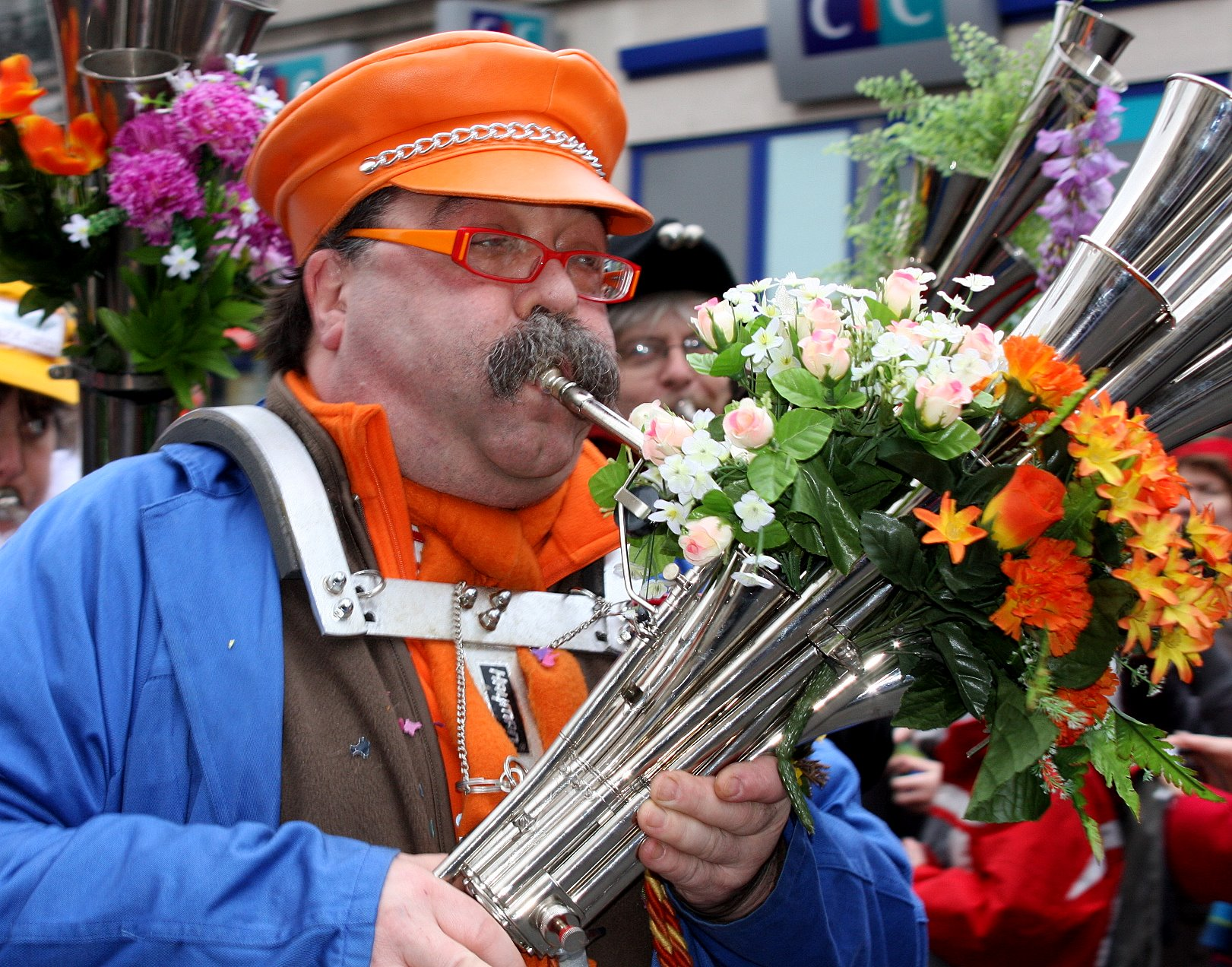
A Martinshorn player at the 2009 Paris Carnival

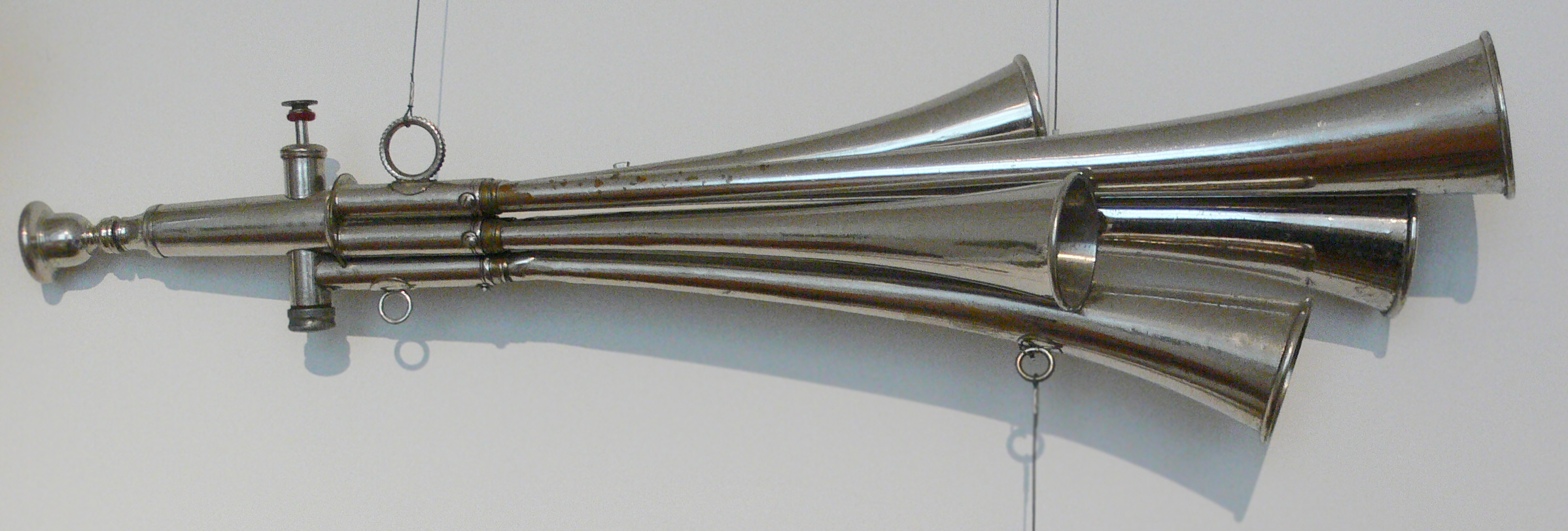

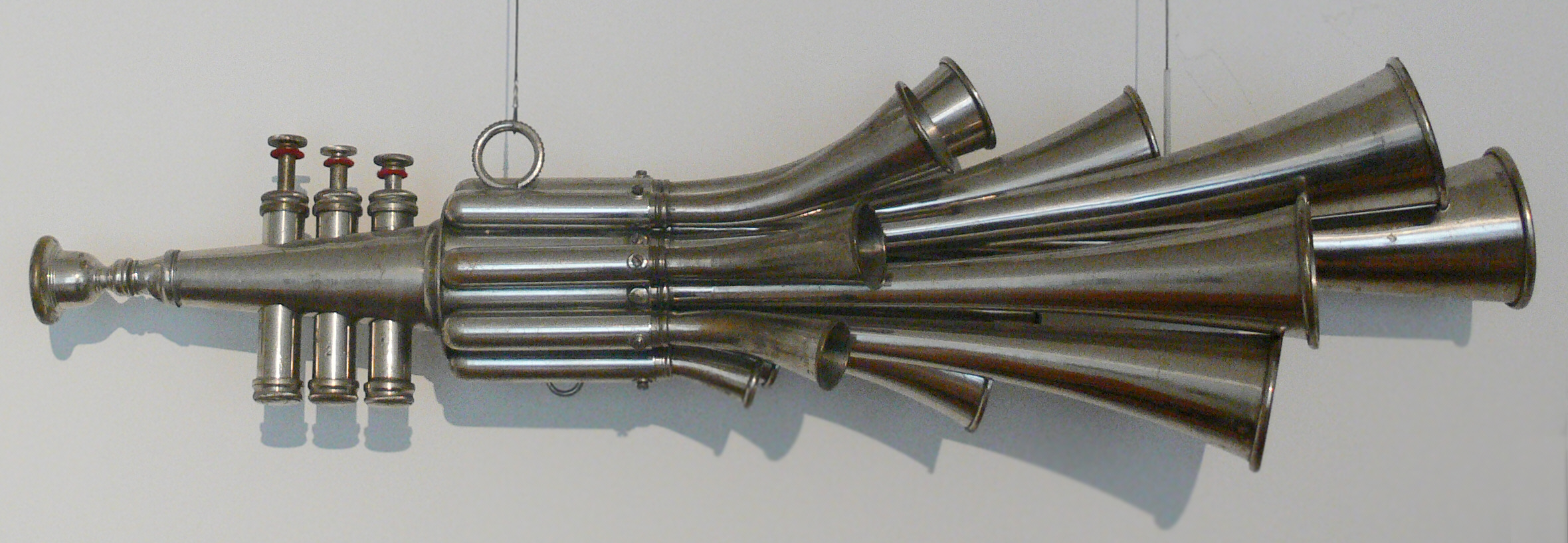

The Martinshorn (also known as the Martin's trumpet and Schalmei) is a German free reed aerophone created in 1880 by Max Bernhardt Martin, who was also the main manufacturer of the instruments. The Martinshorn contains several reeds, each of which having its own horn. The instrument was created in imitation of the saxhorn. The horn can be confused with the shawm, as they are both referred to by the name "Schalmei"; the origins of the similar naming is unknown.

== History ==
After being created, the prototype of the instrument was presented to Wilhelm II, who allegedly did not understand the instrument as a musical instrument, instead using it as a vehicle horn when driving his automobile.

The schalmei was popularised as an instrument in the 1920s by the German Communist Party, inspired by the Wanderbewegung, movement played in bands consisting of 20-30 members. This was particularly effective in the Saarland, where bands were often formed by groups of unemployed coal miners. During the Second World War, many Martinshorns were destroyed by the Nazi Party, under the impression that the instruments were a symbol of Marxism. However, in some parts of Germany, they were used extensively by the Hitler Youth, who, due to their ease of playing and loudness, used them to rally crowds to spread propaganda.

The instrument underwent a period of revitalisation under the GDR, and the tradition of the instrument still prevails in some East German towns. The Martinshorn is usually accompanied by percussion and fifes.

== Construction ==
Martinshorns typically have three valves, although they do not function as in brass instruments, altering the instrument's tube length, instead redirecting the airflow into different bells. Each bell contains a metal reed, playing one note per bell. Most instruments only have 8 bells, so can only play within a diatonic scale, within the range of an octave. Some instruments have a fourth valve, which directs airflow to a modified horn, allowing for chromatic scales. The instrument is only able to be played at one volume, which tends to be rather loud.

Due to being a free reed, the instrument does not require any form of embouchure, tonguing or intonation, only blowing; this greatly improves the instrument's ease of playing.
