= Der letzte Walzer =

Viennese operetta with music by Oscar Straus

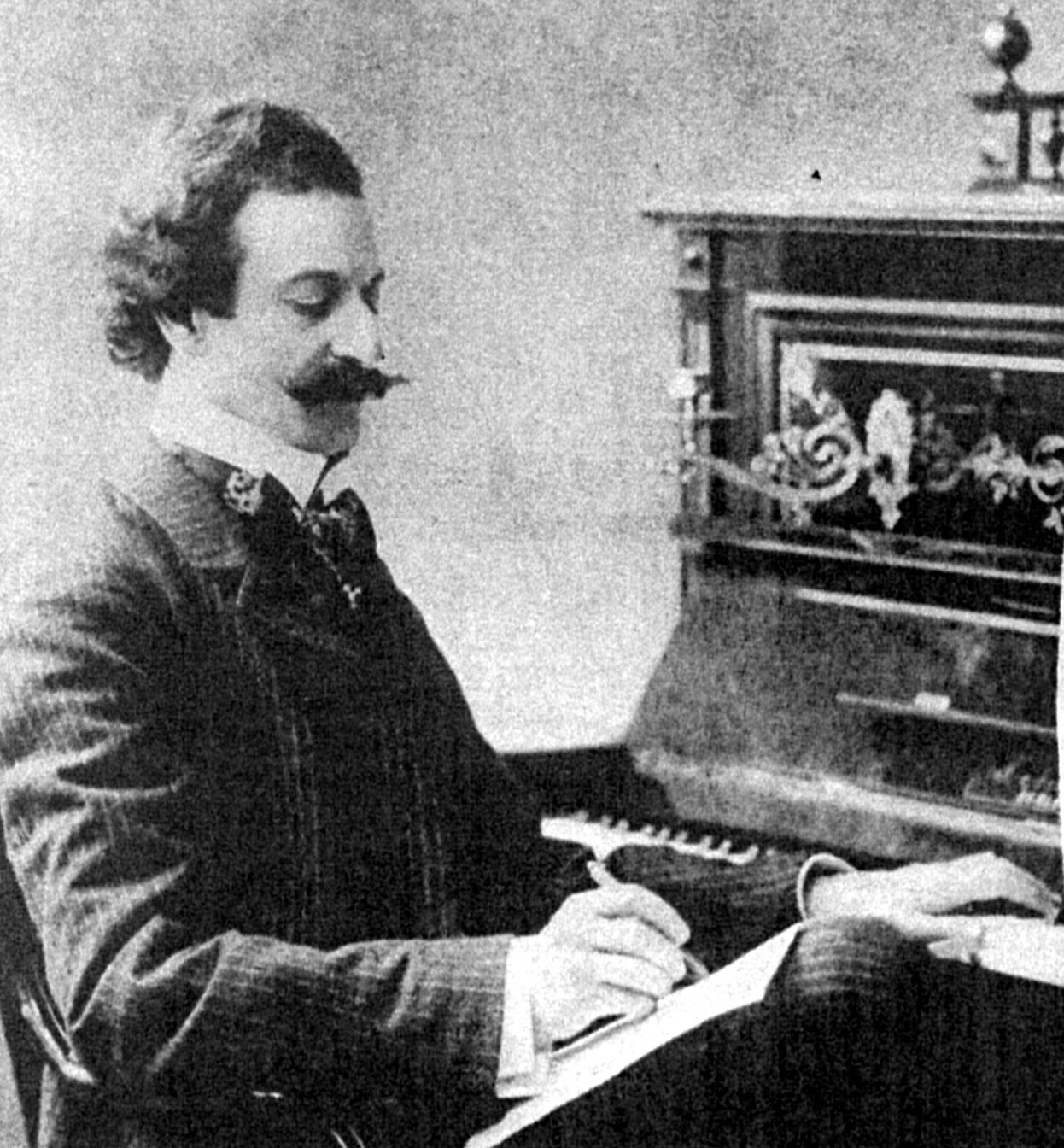
Oscar Straus

Der letzte Walzer (The Last Waltz) is a Viennese operetta in three acts, with music by Oscar Straus, to a libretto by Julius Brammer and Alfred Grünwald. It opened at the Berliner Theater in Berlin on 12 February 1920 and starred Fritzi Massary. It was first given in Vienna at the Theater an der Wien on 5 October 1923, with Betty Fischer, Max Hansen, and Richard Tauber in leading roles.

== English adaptations ==
An English adaptation for Broadway was prepared by Harold Atteridge and Edward Delaney, with additional music by Al Goodman and opened at the Century Theatre in New York on May 10, 1921, running for 185 performances. The show was directed by J. C. Huffman and Frank Smithson.

Another English adaptation was prepared for the London stage by Robert Evett and Reginald Arkell. This version opened at the Gaiety Theatre, London, on December 7, 1922, and ran for 240 performances. It starred José Collins, who sang "The Mirror Song" on BBC radio.

== Film ==
The operetta was the basis for a 1927 German silent film The Last Waltz directed by Arthur Robison and starring Liane Haid, Willy Fritsch and Suzy Vernon. It was then filmed again in 1934, 1936, 1953 and in 1973.

== Roles ==
- General Krasian
- Baron Ippolith Mekowitch
- Prince Paul
- Lieutenant Jack Merrington
- Captain Kaminski
- Lieutenant Labinski
- Ensign Orsinski
- Vladek
- Officer of the Guard
- Countess Alexandrowna
- Annuschka, Hannuschka, Petruschka, Babuschka, and Vera Lisaveta, her daughters
- Chorus of Officer, Attendants, Court Ladies, etc.

== Musical numbers ==
Act 1

- Man is Master of His Fate – Merrington
- Love, the Minstrel – Vera
- Mama! Mama! – Countess, Annuschka, Hannuschka, Petruschka
- I Love You Best Of All – Ippolith and Girls
- The Last waltz – Merrington and Vera

Act 2

- The Laggard Lovers – Ippolith, Girls and Officers
- The Mirror Song – Vera
- I Must Not Tell You So – Babuschka and Ippolith
- When Life and Love Are Calling – Vera and Merrington

Act 3

- O-la-la! – Vera
