= The Last Waltz (1953 film) =

1953 film directed by Arthur Maria Rabenalt

- German: Der letzte Walzer
- Directed by: Arthur Maria Rabenalt
- Written by: Julius Brammer; Curt J. Braun; Alfred Grünwald
- Produced by: Otto Lehmann; Günther Stapenhorst
- Starring: Eva Bartok; Curd Jürgens; O. E. Hasse
- Cinematography: Friedl Behn-Grund
- Edited by: Margot von Schlieffen
- Music by: Oscar Straus (operetta); Bruno Uher
- Production companies: Carlton-Film; Eichberg-Film
- Distributed by: Neue Filmverleih
- Release date: 21 August 1953
- Running time: 96 minutes
- Country: West Germany
- Language: German

The Last Waltz (German: Der letzte Walzer) is a 1953 West German musical romance film directed by Arthur Maria Rabenalt, and starring Eva Bartok, Curd Jürgens, and O. E. Hasse. It is an operetta film, based on the 1920 work The Last Waltz by Oscar Straus. It was one of several film adaptations of the operetta. It was shot partly at the Wiesbaden Studios in Hesse and on location in the Rhineland. The film's sets were designed by the art director Max Mellin.

== Cast ==
- Eva Bartok as Baronesse Vera Opalinski
- Curd Jürgens as Rittmeister Graf Sarassow
- O. E. Hasse as Prinz Paul
- Christl Mardayn as Baronin Opalinski
- Siegfried Breuer as General Krasinski
- Rudolf Schündler as Jerome Thibaut
- Hermann Pfeiffer
- Erni Mangold
- Erica Beer
- Anneliese Kaplan as Babuschka Opalinski
- Ferdinand Anton
- Arno Ebert
- Hans Elwenspoek
- Jaspar von Oertzen
- Irene Mann as dancer
- Vera Schwarz as dancer
- Werner Beer as dancer
