= Oscar Straus (composer) =

Viennese composer (1870–1954)

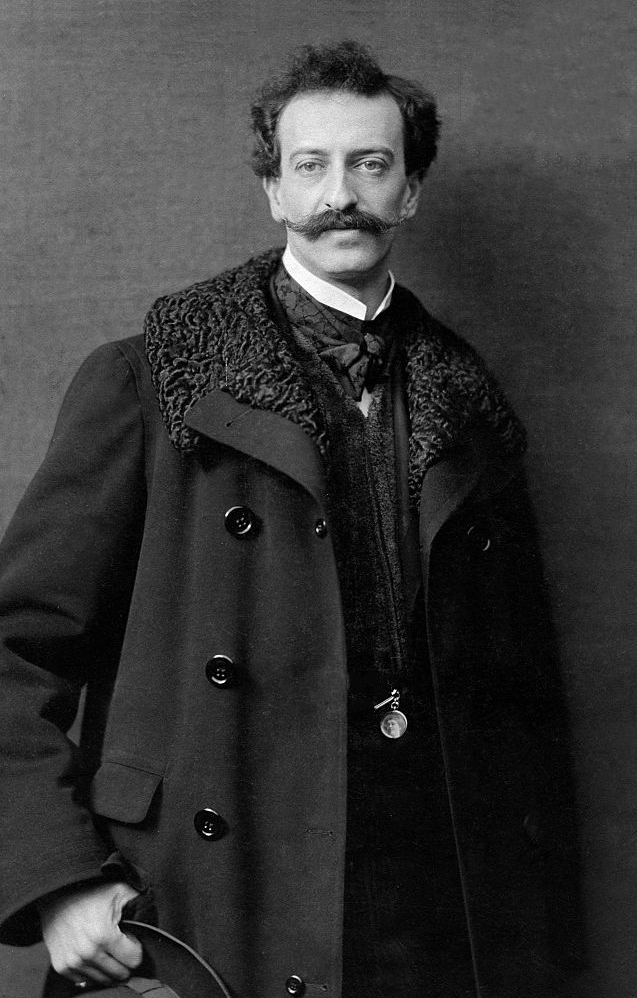
Oscar Straus photographed by Nicola Perscheid in 1907

Oscar Nathan Straus (6 March 1870 – 11 January 1954) was a Viennese composer of operettas, film scores, and songs. He also wrote about 500 cabaret songs, chamber music, and orchestral and choral works. His original name was actually Strauss, but for professional purposes he deliberately omitted the final 's'. He wished not to be associated with the musical Strauss family of Vienna. However, he did follow the advice of Johann Strauss II in 1898 about abandoning the prospective lure of writing waltzes for the more lucrative business of writing for the theatre.

The son of a Jewish family, he studied music in Berlin under Max Bruch, and became an orchestral conductor, working at the Überbrettl cabaret. He went back to Vienna and began writing operettas, becoming a serious rival to Franz Lehár. When Lehár's popular The Merry Widow premiered in 1905, Straus was said to have remarked "Das kann ich auch!" (I can also do that!). In 1939, after the Anschluss, he fled to Paris, where he received the honour of a Chevalier of the Légion d'honneur. In 1940 he fled via Portugal to the United States, where he settled in Hollywood. After the war he returned to Europe, and settled at Bad Ischl, where he died. His grave is in the Bad Ischl Friedhof.

Straus' best-known works are Ein Walzertraum (A Waltz Dream), and The Chocolate Soldier (Der tapfere Soldat). The waltz arrangement from the former is probably his most enduring orchestral work. Among his most famous works is the theme from the 1950 film La Ronde.

== Works ==
=== Operettas ===
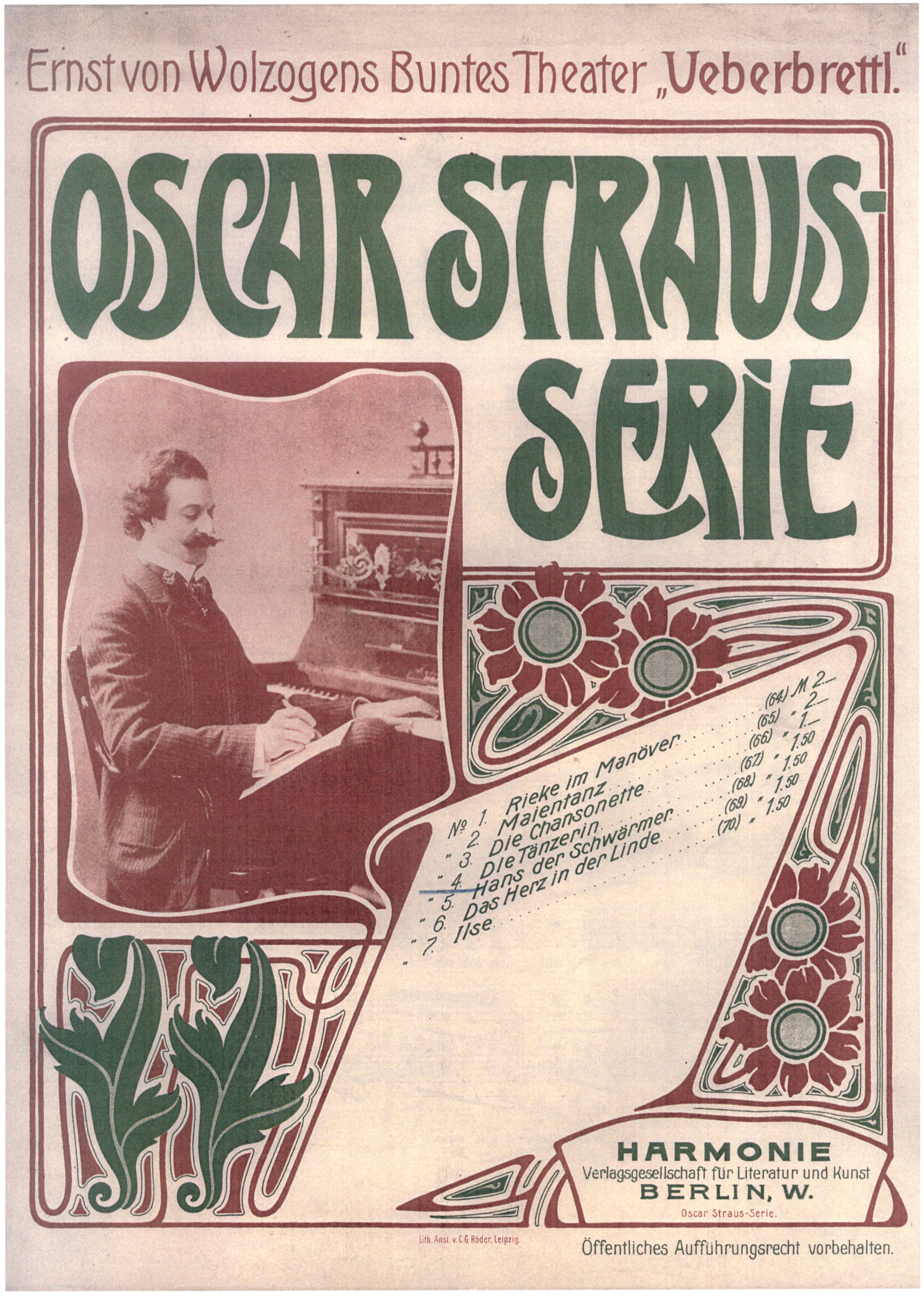
Sheet of music of a Straus' composition for the Überbrettl cabaret

- Die lustigen Nibelungen (The Merry Nibelungs) – 1904
- Zur indischen Witwe – 1905
- Hugdietrichs Brautfahrt (Hugdietrich's Honeymoon) – 1906
- Ein Walzertraum (A Waltz Dream) – 1907
- Der tapfere Soldat (The Gallant Soldier, The Chocolate Soldier) – 1908
- Didi – 1908
- Das Tal der Liebe – 1909
- Mein junger Herr (My Son John) – 1910
- Die kleine Freundin (My Little Friend) – 1911
- Der tapfere Cassian (The Brave Cassian) – 1912
- The Dancing Viennese – 1912
- Love and Laughter – 1913
- Rund um die Liebe – 1914
- Liebeszauber – 1916
- Eine Ballnacht – 1918
- Der letzte Walzer (The Last Waltz) – 1920
- Die Perlen der Cleopatra – 1923
- Die Teresina – 1925
- Die Königin – 1926
- Marietta – [1927 in French, 1928 in German]
- Eine Frau, die weiß, was sie will – 1932
- Drei Walzer (Three Waltzes) – 1935
- Die Musik kommt – 1948
- Ihr erster Walzer (revised version, Die Musik kommt) – 1950
- Bozena – 1952

=== Ballets ===
- Colombine – 1904
- Die Prinzessin von Tragant – 1912

=== Orchestral music ===
- Piano Concerto in B Minor – 1893
- Serenade for String Orchestra in G Minor, Op. 35 – 1905

=== Film scores ===
- A Lady's Morals – 1930
- Danube Love Song – 1931 (never released due to backlash against musicals)
- The Smiling Lieutenant – 1931
- The Southerner – 1932
- One Hour with You – 1932
- The Gentleman from Maxim's – 1933
- Frühlingsstimmen – 1934
- Land Without Music – 1935
- Make a Wish – 1935
- Sarajevo – 1940
- La Ronde – 1950
